= Lunge =

Lunge may mean:

- Lunge (exercise), a weight training exercise
- Lunge (fencing), a fencing technique
- Low Lunge, a yoga pose (Anjaneyasana), and a variant, High Lunge
- Longeing, also spelled Lungeing or Lunging, a technique for training horses where a horse is asked to work at the end of a long line
- Lunge (surname), a surname
- Lunge feeding, an extreme feeding method used by some whales
- "LUNGE", a song by Susumu Hirasawa from Detonator Orgun 2

== Places ==
Lunge, Angola, a commune in the municipality of Bailundo, province of Huambo, Angola

== See also ==
- Longe (disambiguation)
- Lung (disambiguation)
