= Longe =

Longe (Old Norman: le Longe or le Long) is an English and French aristocratic household, descending from the House of Bourbon-Préaux, a cadet branch of the House of Bourbon, and may refer to:

- House of Longe, a surname of Anglo-Norman origin
- Desmond Longe (1914–1990), British Army major, S.O.E agent and high sheriff of Norfolk
- Francis Davy Longe, first-class cricketer and anti-classical economist
- John Longe (1548–1589), archbishop and member of the Privy Council of Ireland
- John Longe (priest) (1765–1834, priest and Norfolk county magistrate
- Patricia Shontz Longe, American economist
- Richard Longe, politician and royalist
- Robert de Longe, artist
- William of Wykeham, Bishop of Winchester and Chancellor of England
- Longe family of Spixworth Park, including a list of High Sheriffs of Norfolk and Suffolk

== Other uses ==
- Longe line, a rope used in Longeing, a technique for training horses in equestrian vaulting
  - Longe cavesson, a halter-like headgear with rings to attach the longe line
- Longe (Pedro Abrunhosa album), a 2010 album by Pedro Abrunhosa
- Longe, a 1999 album by Pólo Norte

== See also ==
- DeLonge, a surname
- Long (Western surname)
