= Christopher M. Woods =

British intelligence officer and SOE adviser (1923–2016)

Christopher Woods
- Born: Christopher Matthew Woods; 26 May 1923; Dulwich, London, England
- Died: 10 January 2016 (aged 92); London, United Kingdom
- Occupations: Intelligence officer, SOE adviser
- Years active: 1943–1980s
- Employers: British Army; Secret Intelligence Service (MI6); Foreign Office
- Known for: Liaison Mission "Ruina" in Italy (1944); Cold War intelligence operations
- Spouse(s): Gillian Rudd (d. 1985); Patricia Temple Muir (m. 1992)
- Children: 5
- Military career
- Allegiance: United Kingdom
- Branch: British Army
- Service years: 1943–1945
- Rank: Major
- Units: King's Royal Rifle Corps; Special Operations Executive (SOE)
- Conflicts: Second World War
- Awards: Military Cross; CMG

Christopher Matthew Woods CMG MC (26 May 1923 – 10 January 2016) was a British intelligence officer and SOE operative who served in northern Italy during the Second World War. He later held senior posts in the Secret Intelligence Service (MI6), overseeing Cold War operations in Europe. After retiring, he was appointed SOE adviser to the Foreign Office.

== Biography ==
=== Early life and education ===
Woods was born in Dulwich, south London, on 26 May 1923. He attended Bradfield College, before winning a scholarship to study history and modern languages at Trinity College, Cambridge.

=== Second World War ===
Woods was commissioned into the King's Royal Rifle Corps in 1943 and later attached to the 5th Battalion, Royal West Kent Regiment, then stationed in Italy. He commanded an anti-tank platoon in the mountainous Abruzzo region during the winter of 1943–44.

In mid-1944, Woods transferred to the Special Operations Executive (SOE) and joined No. 1 Special Force, the central coordinating body for SOE activity in Italy. He was assigned to Liaison Mission "Ruina", a three-man SOE team tasked with supporting partisan resistance in northern Italy.

Resistance identity card issued to Captain Christopher Woods under the alias "Colombo", used during Special Operations Executive (SOE) operations in northern Italy, 1944–1945.

Operating under the nom de guerre "Colombo", Woods was parachuted into the rugged area between the Adige and Brenta. The team's objective was to assist local partisans, coordinate sabotage, and disrupt Axis transport infrastructure in support of Allied advances. The mission led by Major John Wilkinson, a Royal Artillery officer with prior combat experience in North Africa and the Aegean. Woods, then 21, served as second-in-command, accompanied by wireless operator Corporal Douglas Archibold. The mission faced numerous challenges, including unreliable supply drops and rivalries between partisan groups. The team flew from Bari on 12 August 1944 aboard an RAF Dakota, landing behind enemy lines in partisan-held territory.

Despite these setbacks, Woods was instrumental in successful sabotage efforts targeting key road and rail lines prior to the Allied breakthrough into the Po Valley in April 1945. For his actions, he was awarded the Military Cross. From July 1945 to December 1946 he served in Java and Sumatra with the Political Warfare Division.

=== Postwar intelligence career ===
After the war, Woods joined the Secret Intelligence Service (MI6) in 1947 and served in multiple overseas postings, including Iran, Italy, and Poland. His work in the 1950s and 1960s focused on countering Soviet intelligence networks and monitoring political developments in the Eastern Bloc.

In the late 1960s, he was stationed in Warsaw, before returning to Rome. He eventually rose to the position of controller of operations, with responsibility for overseeing British intelligence activity across the Soviet Union and Eastern Europe.

=== SOE adviser and later years ===
After retiring from MI6 in 1988, Woods was appointed SOE adviser to the Foreign and Commonwealth Office. In this capacity, he managed enquiries related to SOE operations and advised on the controlled release of wartime material. He also completed an official history of SOE in Italy. He succeeded Edwin Boxshall in the post and was later followed by Gervase Cowell.

Woods was appointed a Companion of the Order of St Michael and St George (CMG) in 1979 in recognition of his service. He remained a consultant and informal adviser to government circles into his later life. He died on 10 January 2016.

=== Personal life ===
Woods married Gillian Rudd, with whom he had five children, four sons and a daughter. She died in 1985. He later married Patricia Temple Muir in 1992.

== Honours ==
- Military Cross (1944)
- Companion of the Order of St Michael and St George (CMG)

== Sources ==
- "Christopher Woods obituary". The Times and The Sunday Times. 19 January 2016.
- "Christopher Woods, SOE officer". The Telegraph. 22 January 2016.
- Seaman, Mark (2006). Special Operations Executive: A New Instrument of War. Routledge. ISBN 978-0-415-38398-1.
- Stafford, David (2011). Mission Accomplished: SOE and Italy 1943–1945. Bodley Head. ISBN 978-1-84792-065-2.
- West, Nigel (2019). Secret War: The Story of SOE, Britain's Wartime Sabotage Organisation. Pen and Sword. ISBN 978-1-5267-5567-4.
