= List of Special Operations Executive operations =

This is a list of Special Operations Executive operations in World War II.

== Albania ==
- Bernard (1943) (United Kingdom) – Albania, partisan support
- Cameron (1943) (United Kingdom) – Albania, partisan support
- Consensus (1943) (United Kingdom) – Albania, partisan support
- Consensus II (1943) (United Kingdom) – Albania, partisan support
- Cooperation (1943) (United Kingdom) – Albania, partisan support
- Figure (1943) (United Kingdom) – Albania, partisan support
- Gunman (1943) (United Kingdom) – Albania, partisan support
- Primus (1943) (United Kingdom) – Albania, partisan support
- Sapling (1943) (United Kingdom) – Albania, partisan support
- Sconce (1943) (United Kingdom) – Albania, partisan support
- Sculptor (1943) (United Kingdom) – Albania, partisan support
- Slender (1943) (United Kingdom) – Albania, partisan support
- Spillway (1943) (United Kingdom) – Albania, partisan support
- Spinster (1943) (United Kingdom) – Albania, partisan support
- Stables (1943) (United Kingdom) – Albania, partisan support
- Stepmother (1943) (United Kingdom) – Albania, partisan support
- Swifter (1943) (United Kingdom) – Albania, partisan support
- Vertebrae (1943) (United Kingdom) – Albania, partisan support

== Austria ==
- Operation Bongo (1945) (United Kingdom) – Austria, Operation to secure a vault containing many of Europe's art treasures.
- Clowder (1943–45) (United Kingdom) – Austria, establishment of an advance post to make contacts in central and eastern Europe, exploiting resistance movements, and looking especially to work in Austria and Germany.
- Crowd (1945) (United Kingdom) – Austria, 16 March investigation of general conditions of the underground socialist movement in the Sudetenland; fate unknown but thought to have been captured.
- Danbury (1945) (United Kingdom) – Austria, 13 August sabotage of enemy lines of communication in Drau valley, based at Klagenfurt; eventually returned to Bari.
- Operation Denver (1944) (United Kingdom) – Austria, 8 May contact with resistance groups in Sudetenland and establishment of communications. All agents lost through betrayal.
- Drybrook (1945) (United Kingdom) – Austria, 13 August establishment of W/T links in east Tyrol; dropped in error to Germany and returned to UK.
- Duncery (1945) (United Kingdom) – Austria, 24 April preservation of Zeltweg Aerodrome for the Allies, in the event unnecessary through work of local anti-Nazi groups.
- Duval (1945) (United Kingdom) – Austria, 16 February to contact underground organisation in Salzburg and assist in sabotage; party captured.
- Ebensburg (1945) (United Kingdom) – Austria, 8 February organisation of local sabotage with Maquis; capture of Bad Aussee four days before US arrival.
- Electra (1945) (United Kingdom) – Austria, 23 March to contact the underground socialist movement, Vienna; W/T contact never established.
- Evansville (1945) (United Kingdom) – Austria, 7 February support to movement in Graz, and arrangement for agents in Italy; believed killed and underground organisation crushed.
- Greenleaves (1945) (United Kingdom) – Austria, 2 April group based at Klagenfurt; dropped successfully but documents and photos captured; evacuated to Bari.
- Hamster (1945) (United Kingdom) – Austria, 21 April arming of small resistance groups for attacks on road and rail transport; reported working in Klagenfurt.
- Haras (1945) (United Kingdom) – Austria, 30 July to join Communist underground in Innsbruck, establish radio links. Unsuccessful, W/T not dropped and agent attacked.
- Historian (1945) (United Kingdom) – Austria, 24 April attack against communication lines in Klagenfurt.
- Pyx (1945) (United Kingdom) – Austria, 13 June Klagenfurt to Vienna; for creation of safe houses, contact with the resistance locally, sabotage organisation; delay imposed by partisans and capture of information; eventually return of the party to Bari.
- Seafront (1945) (United Kingdom) – Austria, 12 October establishment of safe route to Salzburg and encouragement of resistance in Salzburg; dropped to Germany by mistake.
- Temple (1945) (United Kingdom) – Austria, 13 August establishment of contacts in frontier area; fate unknown.

== Belgium ==
- Aemilius (1944) – Belgium, 3 August 1944, field name Lucie, Rockfort-Marche region.
- Aeneas (1944) – Belgium
- Agamemnon (1944) – Belgium, January/February 1944, field name Suzanne, Tournai, liaison mission with Cufflinks mission, captured.
- Agrippa (1944) – Belgium, 5 March 1944, field name Brooch, W/T mission.
- Alarbus (1944) – Belgium, 3 June 1944, field name Locket, Ciney/Marche region.
- Alcibiades (1944) – Belgium, 5 August 1944, field name Ida, Halle/Nivelles region, provision of instruction in sabotage.
- Alsatian (1943) – Belgium 21–22 April 1943, Briquet. Mission members killed on impact. Aimed at encouragement of resistance in industry.
- Antenor (1944) (United Kingdom) – Belgium, field name Tiepin, Gemblaux.
- Apemantus (1944) (United Kingdom) – Belgium, February/March field name Monique, Beauriang region, liaison with resistance groups.
- Arboretum (1944) – Belgium, agents executed, few details of exact mission.
- Armadillo (1944) (United Kingdom) – Belgium, 6 August field name Gavotte, Ardennes region.
- Association (1941–1942) (United Kingdom) – Belgium, infiltration of agent to Belgium through Lisbon; paid off after attempt at usage .
- Aufidius (1944) (United Kingdom) – Belgium, 1 April filed name Colette, Ciney Marche, liaison mission with chief of zone IV, for organisation of zone, instruction in arms and explosives.
- Autogyro (1941) (United Kingdom) – Belgium, few details in files, mission cancelled after several failures.
- Baboon (1942) (United Kingdom) – Belgium, 17 November Political Intelligence Department mission to encourage peasant resistance.
- Badger (1943) (United Kingdom) – Belgium, February Liège Province region, reception committees, communication with Secret Army; agent deemed 'irresponsible'.
- Balaklava (1941) (United Kingdom) – Belgium, September–October W/T support to Outcaste at Neufchâteau, discovered by Germans.
- Balthazar (1942–1944) (United Kingdom) – Belgium, field name Louse, aimed at paralysis of river traffic in Hainaut region, later expanded to cutting of railway routes and destruction of communications in preparation for D-Day, working to Nelly.
- Bassianus (1944) (United Kingdom) – Belgium, May field name Violette, to work to Nelly, sabotage instruction, including derailment of trains.
- Bernardo (1944) (United Kingdom) – Belgium, 4–5 July Brussels region, messenger to chief of Secret Army, field name Nina.
- Bianca (1944) (United Kingdom) – Belgium, 28–29 June field name Diane, sabotage instruction.
- Borzoi (1943) (United Kingdom) – Belgium, 20 December 1942, Brussels and Tournai, to extend Flemish clandestine press, reception committees; agents escapes to Geneva, March .
- Brabantio (1944) (United Kingdom) – Belgium, July or August filed name Odette, principal delegate to occupied territory for organisation of sabotage.
- Buckhound (1943) (United Kingdom) – Belgium, W/T support, Military Zone IV, Brussels.
- Bullfrog (1943) (United Kingdom) – Belgium, May field name Bullfrog accompanied by Gofer as a signal officer contacts with Secret Army, organisation of reception committees and sabotage groups South of the river Meuse.
- Caius (1944) (United Kingdom) – Belgium, August field name Stephanie, sabotage instruction to Huguette, Brussels and Liège Province region, captured, escaped.
- Calf (1943) (United Kingdom) – Belgium, January aimed at the creation of links to secret army, Hainaut, but a possible security breach.
- Calpurnia (1944) (United Kingdom) – Belgium, July–August field name Courante, W/T support to Huguette group, Hainaut Province.
- Canidus (1944) (United Kingdom) – Belgium, June W/T to Delphine mission.
- Canticle (1942) (United Kingdom) – Belgium, March with Duncan, Mastiff, Incomparable; courier, and W/T support arrested; later agents reported to have been beheaded.
- Caphis (1944) (United Kingdom) – Belgium, January field name Herminie, probably a stage mission, captured.
- Carical (1942–44) (United Kingdom) – Belgium, PID mission, based in Liège, Charleroi, Brussels, to destroy records of the Office National du Travail to undermine the use of skilled labour by the German occupiers.
- Cato (1944) (United Kingdom) – Belgium, July field name Celeste, to provide a messenger link for communications from the Minister of Finance.
- Cawdor (1944) (United Kingdom) – Belgium, February–March field name Roland, accompanied by Necklace, to provide a courier service.
- Cayote (1942) (United Kingdom) – Belgium, (?) May for organisation of motor sabotage, Brussels, accompanied by W/T mission Duncan.
- Celeste (1944) (United Kingdom) – Belgium, July carrying messages from the Belgian Minister of Finance.
- Chicken (1941) (United Kingdom) – Belgium, August field name Tante Caro, creation of organisation based on passive resistance and sabotage in the Antwerp area.
- Chiron (1944) (United Kingdom) – Belgium, April field name Sash, W/T mission; arrested.
- Cimber (1944) (United Kingdom) – Belgium, August field name Yvonne, transmission of microfilmed messages.
- Civet (1942–44) (United Kingdom) – Belgium, also known as mission Stanley, report on strength of secret armies at request of Hubert Pierlot.
- Claribel (1941) (United Kingdom) – Belgium, March preparations for possible use of Belgium by enemy forces as a springboard for the invasion of Britain.
- Claudius (1943) (United Kingdom) – Belgium, July to contact resistance groups - FIL, Mouvement national belge (MNB), Groupe G, and offer financial support.
- Coal/Turtle (1943) (United Kingdom) – Belgium, January abortive mission to steal German fighter aircraft, Brussels.
- Collie (1942) (United Kingdom) – Belgium, March mission for SOE and Belgian Sûreté, to contact resistance, organise reception committees; exfiltration of leader of Belgian Legion, but caused a subsequent quarrel between SOE and the Belgian government in exile over interrogation of leader of Belgian Legion.
- Cominius (1944) (United Kingdom) – Belgium, March–April field name Mitten, Huy, Ardennes region, W/T mission.
- Conjugal (1941) (United Kingdom) – Belgium, September to organise sabotage and contacts, but captured.
- Cordelet (1943–44) (United Kingdom) – Belgium, mission to social and democratic trade unionists, to encourage resistance, and organise a go-slow of Belgian workers in Germany.
- Coriolanus (1944) (United Kingdom) – Belgium, April–May field name Handbag, W/T mission.
- Daniel/Marmoset (1942) (United Kingdom) – Belgium, January sabotage organisation for Periwig.
- Daranus (1944) (United Kingdom) – Belgium, April field name Agnes, investigation of Tybalt/ Claudius mission, information gathering on the efficiency of various groups, re-evaluation of sabotage missions.
- Dingo (1943) (1943–44) (United Kingdom) – Belgium, PID mission, to stimulate slow down in production in the industrial areas of Charleroi, possible security breaches by agent.
- Dolabella (1944) (United Kingdom) – Belgium, July/August field name Ursule, work in organising reception committees with Simone.
- Donaldbain (1944) (United Kingdom) – Belgium, August field name Foxtrot, W/T mission accompanying Odette mission.
- Duncan (1942) (United Kingdom) – Belgium, October attempted infiltration of agent to Belgium via Portugal through a staged desertion; contact eventually lost.
- Emelia (1944) (United Kingdom) – Belgium, August Mrs Olga Jackson, field name Babette, independent propaganda mission for undermining of morale in Brussels, Ghent, Liège, Antwerp, Charleroi; organisation of prostitution circuit aimed at German officers.
- Enorbarbus (1944) (United Kingdom) – Belgium, field name Polka, W/T support to Constantine mission.
- Eros (1944) (United Kingdom) – Belgium, August field name Reel, W/T support.
- Euphronius (1944) (United Kingdom) – Belgium, May field name Arlette, sabotage instruction to Nelly in field, region Bierene.
- Ferret (1942) (United Kingdom) – Belgium, plan to evacuate seven agents from Belgium, including Arboretum, presumed captured by Germans.
- Flaminius (1944) (United Kingdom) – Belgium, October 1943, field name Jacqueline, arrested mid-
- Flavius (1943) (United Kingdom) – Belgium, -44, field name Bib Red, W/T mission.
- Fortinbras (1943) (United Kingdom) – Belgium, field name Bracelet, little detail of mission provided in relevant files.
- Gibbon (1942) (1942) (United Kingdom) – Belgium, -44, PWE mission, organisation of carrier pigeon communication systems.
- Glamis (1944) (United Kingdom) – Belgium, April field name Josephine, Huy, Andenne region, adjunct to Service Hotton sabotage group.
- Gratiano (1944) (United Kingdom) – Belgium, January, field name Ping Pong, W/T operator for Samoyède II, based Brussels.
- Greyhound (1942) (United Kingdom) – Belgium, -45, organisation of escape routes through France to Spain (also known as WOODCHUCK and ANTOINE).
- Griffon (1943) (United Kingdom) – Belgium, February field name Genon, sent in with W/T mission Badger to Huy region; 2e Bureau agent sent to liaise with secret armies, eventually captured and sent to Dachau.
- Guineapig (1943) (United Kingdom) – Belgium, October field name Wig, with Flaminius, arrested.
- Gypsy (1942) (United Kingdom) – Belgium, September 1941, to organise reception committees, VERMILLION courier routes, arrested (?) May .
- Hecate (1944) (United Kingdom) – Belgium, (?) mid-, W/T mission to Huguette group, based in Brussels.
- Hector (World War II) (?) (United Kingdom) – Belgium, Hector 2 captured. Otherwise little detail available in the file.
- Helenus (1944) (United Kingdom) – Belgium, August field name Jeannine, Brussels, sabotage instructor for Nola.
- Hillcat (1943) (United Kingdom) – Belgium, August sent with Tybalt, W/T missioni to Hector group.
- Hireling (1941) (United Kingdom) – Belgium, September arrested shortly after landing, escape, investigation by MI5.
- Horatio (1944) (United Kingdom) – Belgium, January 1944, field name Glove, Brussels, W/T mission for Hector II and Nelly, arrested May .
- Hortensius (1944) (United Kingdom) – Belgium, January 1944, field name Valentine, sabotage of waterways, Wanneberg and Brussels region, arrested in April.
- Iachimo (1944) (United Kingdom) – Belgium, field name Noemie, to contact resistance groups of MNB. No clue in files as to success.
- Iago (1944) (United Kingdom) – Belgium, January field name Scipio, provision of counter scorch organisation in Antwerp; investigation of security of Hector organisation under recent arrests.
- Imogen (1944) (United Kingdom) – Belgium, July/August field name Alice, courier for Odette, successful mission.
- Incomparable (1942) (United Kingdom) – Belgium, March PID propaganda mission, to contact and obtain influence in sabotage organisation; no clue in these files as to its fate.
- Independence (1941) (United Kingdom) – Belgium, April via Gibraltar; to contact any existing organisations and assess progress, advise on needs. No clue as to outcome.
- Intersection (1942) (United Kingdom) – Belgium, January captured shortly afterwards, investigation on use by Germans and possible arrest of other agents.
- Jerboa (1943) (United Kingdom) – Belgium, April Ghent, Sûreté de l'État mission, to limit industrial production, some sabotage of waterways.
- Junius (1944) (United Kingdom) – Belgium, May/June field name Parasol, W/T mission, possibly arrested.
- Koala (1942) (United Kingdom) – Belgium, June to stimulate a go-slow action to Beringen coal mines to reduce output, also to prepare sabotage on railways and the Albert Canal.
- Labrador (1943) (United Kingdom) – Belgium, January 2ieme mission, to organise reception committees; later doubts as to security.
- Lacquer (1941) (United Kingdom) – Belgium, September sent to liaise with Conjugal organisation.
- Lamb (1942) (United Kingdom) – Belgium, April/May W/T mission, to the secret army.
- Lavinia (1944) (United Kingdom) – Belgium, March/April field name Victorine, organisation mission, sabotage against river traffic and locks.
- Lear (1943) (United Kingdom) – Belgium, August to assist Stanley mission in cooperation with the secret army.
- Lemur (1942) (United Kingdom) – Belgium, November British officer sent to try to resolveccurrent impasse, to organise reception committees, Ghent region.
- Lepidus (1944) (United Kingdom) – Belgium, May field name Waltz, W/T mission with Huguette, eventually captured.
- Ligarius (1944) (United Kingdom) – Belgium, June 1944, field name Margot, liaison with Delphine, sabotage training; arrested July .
- Lodovico (1944) (United Kingdom) – Belgium, May Namur region, field name Rosalie, sabotage instruction mission.
- Lucullus (1944) (United Kingdom) – Belgium, January field name Gauntlet, Nivelles, W/T mission.
- Luculluss (1944) (United Kingdom) – Belgium, March field name Jeanette, shot down.
- Lynx (1942) (United Kingdom) – Belgium, June Neufchâteau area, W/T mission.
- M 12/Tiber (1945) (United Kingdom) – Italy, political and military liaison mission; a sparse file suggests activity in Liguria and Genoa.
- Macduff (1943) (United Kingdom) – Belgium, May with Ibex and Seal, to find reception committees for Civer, to act as an adjunct to mission Stanley.
- Majordomo (1942) (United Kingdom) – Belgium, January with Mandamus, reports on arrests, including Lacquer agents.
- Man Friday (1942) (United Kingdom) – Belgium, January contact existing secret organisations, collect political and propaganda information.
- Mandamus (1942) (United Kingdom) – Belgium, January to organise sabotage, passive resistance, arms dumps, possibly crashed after take-off.
- Mandrill (1943) (United Kingdom) – Belgium, PID mission to contact Cordier mission for the demoralisation of German support, reception of propaganda, Liège, Brussels, Ghent.
- Manelaus (1943) (United Kingdom) – Belgium, October liaison mission to chief of zone 1, field name Berthe.
- Marcius (1943) (United Kingdom) – Belgium, February/March field name Necklace, W/T support to chief Osric; presumed arrested.
- Mardian (1944) (United Kingdom) – Belgium, July field name Mathilde, to work with Celeste.
- Marmot (1942) (United Kingdom) – Belgium, September support to existing sabotage movement in Mons, Scheldt region.
- Mastiff (1942) (United Kingdom) – Belgium, March W/T mission with Incomparable; no reports received.
- Menas (1944) (United Kingdom) – Belgium, August field name Eugénie, to contact Samoyède II and Stentor organisation.
- Mencrates (1944) (United Kingdom) – Belgium, April/May field name Hortense, sabotage mission to Nelly.
- Menenius (1944) (United Kingdom) – Belgium, August field name Simone, organisation of reception committees; arrives too late to fulfil mission.
- Messala (1944) (United Kingdom) – Belgium, June to regain direction in field of railway dislocation, replace Nelly and organise sabotage structure, field name Huguette.
- Mink (1942) (United Kingdom) – Belgium, chief steward in Belgian merchant navy, escaping to form sabotage organisation in Antwerp region and await W/T.
- Mongoose (1942) (United Kingdom) – Belgium, June to contact secret armies, arrange reception committees; established but no reports received.
- Montano (1944) (United Kingdom) – Belgium, March reports on Groupe G activities, investigation of Yapok, Fabius and Hector II missions, creation of PWE structure and sabotage central Brussels.
- Mouse (1942) (United Kingdom) – Belgium, March drops unoccupied France, arrested shortly after landing.
- Mule (1942) (United Kingdom) – Belgium, April/May Free French recruit, to organise transport and sabotage in Antwerp.
- Musjid (1941) (United Kingdom) – Belgium, September/October contact organisations in east and west Flanders, creation of reception and sabotage organisations, organiser Aboretum, to be dispatched.
- Newsagent (1943) (United Kingdom) – Belgium, May with W/T operator Vampire, to organise reception committees and sabotage groups in Antwerp and Limburg.
- Nicanor (1943) (United Kingdom) – Belgium, January /February field name Therese, support to chief Belgian organisers.
- Opinion (1941) (United Kingdom) – Belgium (?), mission to cultivate contacts in ecclesiastical circles, including the king's entourage.
- Othello (1943) (United Kingdom) – Belgium, June mission to organise agricultural resistance, develop clandestine press and the encouragement of the sale of produce direct to the population, thus undermining occupation controls.
- Outcast (1941) (United Kingdom) – Belgium, September/October to work also into Luxembourg to contact existing groups or set up new ones, plan sabotage of power stations, industrial targets.
- Outhaul (1941) (United Kingdom) – Belgium, set for June did not take place, little information as to purpose in available file.
- Pandarus (1944) (United Kingdom) – Belgium, March, field name Cufflinks; to supply 90,000 dollars to secret army and aid building up to wireless network.
- Patroclus (1944) (United Kingdom) – Belgium, April/May 1944, with Velutus and Publius, field name Bracelet, works to Osric, Brussels, but arrested June .
- Operation Patron (1944) (United Kingdom) – Belgium, 1944, proposed exfiltration of Prince Charles of Belgium, brother of the King; no progress by August .
- Periwig (1941) (United Kingdom) – Belgium, Sabotage mission with radio broadcast from Brussels towards London. "Armand" captured by GFP in january 1942 (few details in the file).
- Philotus (1943) (United Kingdom) – Belgium, August establishment of organisation for reception and distribution of propaganda, attacks against pro-Fascists, and obstruction of work of collaborators.
- Phrynia (1944) (United Kingdom) – Belgium, August field name Liliane, to Osric, communications, information and reconnaissance for the chief of the area.
- Platypus (1942) (United Kingdom) – Belgium, August with Man Friday, mission with Belgian Sûreté and Political Warfare Executive (PWE) to influence Belgian industry towards go-slow tactics, collection of economic data; status of mission questioned by 'C'.
- Pointer (1943) (United Kingdom) – Belgium, July with Claudius, later W/T to Claudius, contact with escape organisations; but questions over contact with German agents.
- Polonius (1944) (United Kingdom) – Belgium, January field name Belt, to Tybalt, north of Nivelles.
- Priam (1944) (United Kingdom) – Belgium, May/June field name Hubertine, sabotage instruction mission.
- Publius (1944) (United Kingdom) – Belgium, April/May field name Muff, W/T mission to Colette
- Rat/Goat (1943) (United Kingdom) – Belgium, April organisation of courier line for escapees and mail.
- Regan (1944) (United Kingdom) – Belgium, February field name Lining, W/T mission to Scipio.
- Reynaldo (1944) (United Kingdom) – Belgium, August field name Gabrielle, to contact chief of the secret army.
- Rhombold (1941) (United Kingdom) – Belgium, October Chevron area, W/T and sabotage.
- Roderigo (1944) (United Kingdom) – Belgium, May field name Paulette, sabotage instruction to Nelly organisation, Lessines region.
- Rosencrantz (1944) (United Kingdom) – Belgium, September W/T mission, overtaken by Allied advance.
- Sable (1942) (United Kingdom) – Belgium, April/May east of Blois, to establish sabotage group near Antwerp, part of mission known as 'the Toughs', to disorganise transport, railways, communications.
- Samoyède (1943) (United Kingdom) – Belgium, May PID mission, for pre- and post- liberation work, jamming of German wireless installations, aim of helping Allies from D-Day in use of press, cinema and radio.
- Sempronius (1944) (United Kingdom) – Belgium, February/March field name Ernestine, assistance to chief of sabotage, organisation of reception of material, using business cover; no reports received from mission in surviving file.
- Silkmerchant (1941) (United Kingdom) – Belgium, May organisation of passive resistance through liberal and social parties, eventually leading to sabotage.
- Socrates (1943–44) (United Kingdom) – Belgium, to organise financial aid to resistance organisations.
- Terrier (1942) (United Kingdom) – Belgium, March Rochefort area, W/T mission suspicions of possible use of W/T sets by the enemy.
- Tybalt (1942–44) (United Kingdom) – Belgium, organisational mission to contact resistance CLAUDIUS groups, secret armies and FIL, the largest sub group in Belgium, and bring these within SOE coordination.
- Union (1944) (1944) (United Kingdom) – France, January to investigate Maquis strength, Savone region.
- Varro (1944) (United Kingdom) – Belgium, field name Delphine, mission to investigate arrests in Tybalt organisation.
- Vergillia (1944) (United Kingdom) – Belgium, February field name Nelly, chief sabotage organisation working to chief of staff, SOE and Belgian Sûreté, with the aim of dislocating rail and road transportation on D-Day.
- Yapok (1944) (United Kingdom) – Belgium, February with Montano and Volumnia missions, field name Shoelace; arrested and escaped.

== France ==
- Aloes (1944) – France, 1944, code name for resistance headquarters, Brittany, W/T communications to five departments of Brittany.
- Armada (1943) (United Kingdom) – France, November sabotage of Le Creusot electricity power, also transformer stations and fuel depots.
- Bezique/Dressmaker (1943) (United Kingdom) – France, sabotage of tanneries at Graulhet (Pau-Toulouse) and Mazamet (Carcassonne); unsuccessful.
- Citronelle (1944) (United Kingdom) – France, to assess Maquis Strength, Ardennes region.
- Echalotte (1944) (United Kingdom) – France, wireless bases in Moselle and Vosges area to augment existing radio circuits and to provide information to London from rear of German line.
- Eucalyptus (1944) (United Kingdom) – France, derived from Union, liaison mission, Vercors. Commander, Major Desmond Longe.
- Hangman (1942) (United Kingdom) – France, sabotage of pylons; training for the operation took place, but no indications are available from the file that the operation took place.
- Housekeeper (1943) (United Kingdom) – France, sabotage of canal lock at Lesdains.
- Josephine B (1941) (United Kingdom) – France, sabotage of transformer sub station Pessac.
- Pilchard (1942) (United Kingdom) – France, sabotage of Matisse works, Versailles, and BREWER Radio Paris at Allouis.
- Sainfoin (1944) (United Kingdom) – France, September Pantarlier region, working behind enemy lines in advance of Allies.
- Savanna (1941) (United Kingdom) – and France, sabotage of Vannes aerodrome.
- Scullion (1943) (Free France) – France, 18 April independent French mission to sabotage Les Telots shale oil refinery.
- Sling (1944) (United Kingdom) – France, attack on Paris electricity supplies by systematic destruction of pylons on three main lines; successful.
- Operation Sophie (1943) (United Kingdom) – France, June dispatch of assistant to De Gaulle's commissaire for France.

== Germany ==
- Braddock I (1944) (United Kingdom) – Germany, dropping of incendiary devices by air for possible use by prisoners of war in an uprising.
- Braddock II (1944) (United Kingdom) – Germany, dropping of propaganda information in Germany
- Calvados (1943) (United Kingdom) – Germany, attempt to start a sabotage organisation in Hamburg and Bremen, using a German deserter, Kurt Koenig.
- Colan (1945) (United Kingdom) – Germany, sabotage of railway between Stuttgart and Heilbronn, reports of success by agents.
- Downend (1944) (United Kingdom) – Germany, agent sent to create a sabotage organisation in the Ruhr and Frankfurt area, based on a nucleus of contacts with the ISK.
- Fleckney (1944) (United Kingdom) – Germany, -45, establishment of an organiser for sabotage in Breslau region.
- Fordwick (1944) (United Kingdom) – Germany, establishment of a line for agents and information between Germany and Denmark.
- Foxley (1944–45) (United Kingdom) – Germany, plan to assassinate Hitler pressed by SOE and supported by Duff Cooper. A full implementation and intelligence report was drawn up but was not taken forward; internal arguments against the assassination included the possibility of a resulting Hitler martyr cult; and, when the war would eventually be won, a lessening of the perception that Nazism had been decisively crushed by the Allies. In any event, plans to deal with Hitler's subordinates, including Goebbels, found favour but were not implemented (Operation Little Foxleys).
- Frilford (1944) (United Kingdom) – Germany, -45, to sabotage railway track from Hintshingen to Oberlauchringen; reports from agents on success.
- Vivacious (1944–45) (United Kingdom) – Germany, agent (2nd Lieutenant Baker Byrne) sent to sabotage the Bruno Hintze precision engineering works in Berlin, active in the production of V2 rocket components. Not successful, but agent managed to return to Britain.

== Greece ==
- Animals (1943) (United Kingdom) – Greece, redeployment of Harling personnel to disrupt German communication to western Greece and add credibility to a false plan of invasion there.
- Harling (1942) (United Kingdom) (Greece) – sabotage of the Gorgopotamos viaduct in a joint operation by a British mission and Greek Resistance groups.
- Locksmith (1943) (United Kingdom) – attempted sabotage of the Corinth Canal by a four-man team led by Mike Cumberlege.
- Noah's Ark (1944) (United Kingdom) – proposed operations to harass German withdrawal from Greece

== India ==
- Creek (1943) (United Kingdom) – successful attack on Ehrenfels, a German ship transmitting information to U-boats from neutral Portugal's territory of Goa

== Italy ==
- Aileron (1944) – Italy, brief report only available in the files of an agent sent to Siena in March 1944, purpose unclear.
- Almouth (1944) – Italy, February 1944, plans for blowing up of railway bridge over the Taro; the relevant file provides few clues to outcome.
- Ampthill (1944) – Italy, March 1944, rail sabotage at Pedaso.
- Atlow (1944) (United Kingdom) – Italy, April sabotage against railways in the Siena area, Asciano.
- Balloonet (1944–1945) (United Kingdom) – Italy, political and military mission to the East Tyrol and VIOLET south-west Carinthia.
- Bandon VII (1945) (United Kingdom) – Italy, continued political and military liaison mission in Turin. Appears to have had the task of facilitating supplies by safeguarding Rivoli airport.
- Bergenfield (1944–1945) (United Kingdom) – Italy, political and military liaison mission to the TABELLA partisans, Udine area.
- Blundell (1944) (United Kingdom) – Italy, political and military liaison mission to VIOLET Piacenza partisans, working in La Spezia region. The relevant files contain reports by leaders Captain T D Gregg and Major Lett.
- Blundell (1944–1945) (United Kingdom) – Italy, general name used to denote the various liaison missions to the Italian partisans in the north, .
- Boykin (1945) (United Kingdom) – Italy, plan for kidnapping of suspected double agents who were thought to be compromising the north Italian resistance. Although successful when carried out in February: interrogation of the agents later suggested that the suspicions were unfounded.
- Cherokee (1944–45) (United Kingdom) – Italy, political and military liaison mission to partisans in ANTI-SCORCH northern Piedmont.
- Cisco (1945) (United Kingdom) – Italy, political and military liaison mission, Modena-Reggio, aiming to create a secure base on the northern Apennine Mountains.
- Colossus (1941) (United Kingdom) – Italy, February Landing of sabotage of bridges.
- Coolant (1944–45) (United Kingdom) – Italy, political and military liaison mission to the partisans COOLANT BLUE north east of Udine.
- Corona (1944) (1944–45) (United Kingdom) – Italy, political and military liaison mission, Piedmont.
- Donum (1944–45) (United Kingdom) – Italy, political and military liaison mission in east Piedmont.
- Envelope (1945) (United Kingdom) – Italy Reggio Emilia region, political and military liaison BLUE (TOFFEE) mission.
- Evaporate (1945) (United Kingdom) – Italy, political and military liaison mission to Modena.
- Ferret(1944) (United Kingdom) – Italy, June to land three A Force agents north of Bonassola on the Ligurian coast and attempt a meeting with an existing Ferret party.
- Ferrula (1944) (United Kingdom) – Italy, -45, Val d'Aosta, political and military liaison mission.
- Flap/Fin (1944) (United Kingdom) – Italy, 1945, political and military liaison mission to southern Piedmont, dispatched August. Also appears to be known as Temple mission.
- Floodlight (1944) (United Kingdom) – Italy, -45, political and military liaison mission consisting of Major W O Churchill, to act as British Liaison Officer to General Cadorna at the request of the CLNAI in northern Italy.
- Gela Blue (1944) (United Kingdom) – Italy, -45, political and military liaison mission to partisans in Vittorio Veneto.
- Genesse (1945) (United Kingdom) – Italy, military and political liaison mission to Oltre-Po, Pavese and partisans of Ligurian zone.
- Hail (1944) (United Kingdom) – Italy, date uncertain. Few papers are provided on this file, but the mission appears to have been led by Petrucci, shot by the SS in March .
- Hapale (1945) (United Kingdom) – Italy, political and military liaison mission to the partisans, southern Piedmont; signals investigation mission.
- Hapeville (1945) (United Kingdom) – Italy probably little detail on the file, but likely to have been a liaison mission to the partisans at Bergamasco.
- Harrisburg (1945) (United Kingdom) – Italy, political and military liaison mission to partisans
- Herring (1945) (Kingdom of Italy) – Italy, April 1944 raid by Italian paratroops on German supply lines.
- Herrington (1945) (United Kingdom) – Italy, political and military liaison mission, northern Lombardy, to the partisans of Bergamasco.
- Homestead (1945) (United Kingdom) – Italy, political and military liaison mission, northern Lombardy.
- Incisor (1945) (United Kingdom) – Italy, political and military liaison mission to the Val d'Aosta area.
- Indelible (1945) (United Kingdom) – Italy, military and political liaison mission to partisans in the COTULLA Savona province
- Insulin (1945) (United Kingdom) – Italy, March political and military liaison mission, Piacentina area.
- Izarra (?) (United Kingdom) – Italy, proposed exfiltration of General Gustvo Pesenti.
- Leyton (1944) (United Kingdom) – Italy, July to block enemy transport and communications on the coast road, Fano to Pesaro.
- M 11 (1945) (United Kingdom) – Italy, political and military liaison mission, Asti and Piedmont (existed under different leadership before this date).
- M 6 (1944–45) (United Kingdom) – Italy, political and military liaison mission in Biella area.
- Mallaby/Neck (1945) (United Kingdom) – Italy, 1943 with a second mission the first W/T mission dropped by parachute to Lake Como, but was captured on landing. The agent, Richard Mallaby, also known as Olaf and Richard Tucker, provided a W/T link during the final surrender of the Axis forces in Italy after being captured during his second mission.
- Moselle (1943–45) (United Kingdom) – Italy, wireless operation, agent captured in Sardinia and AVOCAT possibly played back against SOE.
- Pool (1944) (United Kingdom) – Italy, May. Pool I was a landing on Elba near Capo San Andrea, with Pool II being the exfiltration of agents from the same place.
- Potato (1944) (United Kingdom) – Italy, sabotage of the railway line from Siena to Empoli and subsidiary roads, June to July .
- Ricco (1944–45) (United Kingdom) – Italy, political and military mission to partisans; road party in the La Spezia area.
- Rudder (?) (United Kingdom) – Italy, codename for telegrams received from Rome through a code specially infiltrated immediately after the armistice.
- Ruina (1944–45) (United Kingdom) – Italy, political and military liaison mission to partisans, west Veneto. The file contains a detailed sabotage diary.
- Saki (1944–45) (United Kingdom) – Italy, political and military liaison mission Liguria region.
- Turdus (1944) (United Kingdom) – Italy, Lunese area, political and military liaison mission to partisans.

== Netherlands ==
- Artichoke (1942) (United Kingdom) – Holland, June to destroy VLF stations at Kootwijk, the communications centre for U-boats in North Sea. An agent was to be exfiltrated, but the file provides no further details.
- Backgammon/Draughts (1944) (United Kingdom) – Holland organising mission, .
- Broadbean (1943) (United Kingdom) – Holland, February to collect mail from resistance groups in northern Holland and arrange transportation.
- Curling (1944) (United Kingdom) – Holland, W/T mission to chief operator.
- Dicing (1945) (United Kingdom) – Holland, (?) April Jedburgh team to represent special forces and act as liaison between resistance and paratroops in the Assen, Meppel and Coevorden area.
- Draughts (1945) (United Kingdom) – Holland, January W/T mission, north Holland.
- Gambling (1945) (United Kingdom) – Holland, Jedburgh team to Veluwe region.
- Kuyper (1944) (Netherlands) – Holland, October Lieutenant Dubois of Dutch army sent to organise reception committee and locate evading service personnel. Captured.
- Market (1944) (United Kingdom) – Holland, September liaison missions for Arnhem operations, EDWARD, provision of W/T contacts with England during airborne operation CLAUDE, Operation Market Garden. The four Jedburgh teams were Edward, Claude, CLARENCE and Clarence and Daniel.
- Rummy (1944) (United Kingdom) – Holland, to contact underground movements and report on security aspects after recent German successes against the circuits.
- Tiddleywinks (1944) (United Kingdom) – Holland, August to re-establish propaganda links, send messages to the underground press on behalf of the Queen; agent injured on landing.

== North Africa ==
- Falaise (1941) (United Kingdom) – Tangier, -42, destruction of an enemy wireless station used for providing locations of Allied submarines in the Straits of Gibraltar.

== Norway ==
- Barbara (1941) - Trondheim, sabotage train line between Trondheim and Storlien.
- Redshank (1942) - Orkanger, sabotage the transformer station to stop pyrite transportation from Orkla mines to the shipping harbor at Thamshavn.
- Kestrel (1942) - Fosdalen, sabotage the iron mine equipment to halt the increase in production.
- Marshfield (1942) - Nesset, sabotage the Rødsand iron mines. SOE agents dispatched but disappeared after landing.
- Chaffinch (1943) - Moss, sabotage shipping and make contact with resistance groups. SOE agents escaped after sinking a vessel.

== Portugal ==
- Panicle (1941) (United Kingdom) – Portugal, planning for delay of any enemy advance into Portugal.

== Spain ==
- Defiance (1942–43) (United Kingdom) – Spain, attempt to build up 'traditionalist', probably Catalan, support in the Barcelona area.
- Hollowshoes (1942) (United Kingdom) – Spain, -45, building up of a network by Emilio Varas Canal. The group took its name from the latter's girlfriend who proved her ability to create hollow heeled footwear.
- Periwig (1944–45) (United Kingdom) – Spain, a plan for the planting of evidence on captured Germans (who would presumably be allowed to escape) which would lead to the belief that the real German underground resistance movement was being organised from Britain. There is no evidence in the file to suggest that it went ahead.
- Pompey (?) (United Kingdom) – Spanish section plan for deception to suggest that the Allies intended to attack southern France or Greek islands.
- Relator (1941–43) (United Kingdom) – Spain, name given to the training of a party of area commanders to be used in Spain; also appear to be known as "Ali Baba and the 20 thieves". Their purpose was to delay the enemy in any advance into Spain.
- Reproach (1941–43) (United Kingdom) – Spain, general name for attempts to build up support among Spanish 'traditionalists' in the event of an invasion of Spain, in the Navarre area.
- Warden (1941) (United Kingdom) – Spain, plan for the sabotage of eight enemy ships in Las Palmas harbour; no evidence that this was carried out.

== Sweden ==
- Bridford (1943–44) (United Kingdom) – Blockade running operation smuggling vital war supplies from Sweden to the UK using converted Motor Gun Boats
- Rubble (1941) (United Kingdom) – Evacuation of Norwegian flagged ships from Sweden to the UK, transporting vital war supplies.

== Yugoslavia ==
- Bullseye (1941) (United Kingdom) – Submarine landing to Montenegrin coast, to contact anti-Axis resistance in Yugoslavia
- Hydra (1943) (United Kingdom) – failed contact operation with Josip Broz Tito's Partisans
- Typical (1943) (United Kingdom) – The 22 May airdrop of a British delegation to Tito's headquarters.
- Noah's Ark (1944) (United Kingdom) – proposed operations to harass German withdrawal from Greece

== West Africa ==
- Postmaster (1942) (United Kingdom) – West Africa, capture of two Italian ships.

== Miscellaneous ==
- Bandon (?) (United Kingdom) – The files include a report on the HQ in Turin and the liberation of the city.
- Cabaret (1942) (United Kingdom) – An attempt to repeat Operation Rubble - abandoned.
- Casement (1944) (United Kingdom) – A deception plan aimed at creating the belief that Germans were fleeing to Éire or Argentina to form a free German government. Suggested by the Spanish section during it did not go ahead through the lack of evidence of the Spanish escape connection considered necessary for its success.
- Codford (?) (United Kingdom) – Name for all operations designed to prevent enemy states from seizing assets of neutral foreign countries.
- Moonshine (1944) (United Kingdom) – Growing out of Operation Bridford, a partially successful operation to deliver arms to the Danish resistance and return via Sweden carrying war supplies.
- Performance (1942) (United Kingdom) – An attempt to repeat Operation Rubble - partial success with heavy casualties.
- Rankin (?) (United Kingdom) – Codeword for planning of operation in the event of German withdrawal from occupied countries.
- Siamang (?) (United Kingdom) – Val Maria area, helping to coordinate anti-scorch measures to protect hydroelectric plants in the region.
- Operation Remorse (United Kingdom) – An economic operation in Hong Kong and other parts of China, that included counterfeiting currency and smuggling, which generated over £77 million in profit for the SOE.

== See also ==
- List of World War II military operations
