= Chapois =

Chapois may refer to:

- Chapois, Jura
- Chapois, Belgium
