= Haversin Castle =

Castle in Wallonia, Belgium

Coordinates: 50.249°N 5.203°E

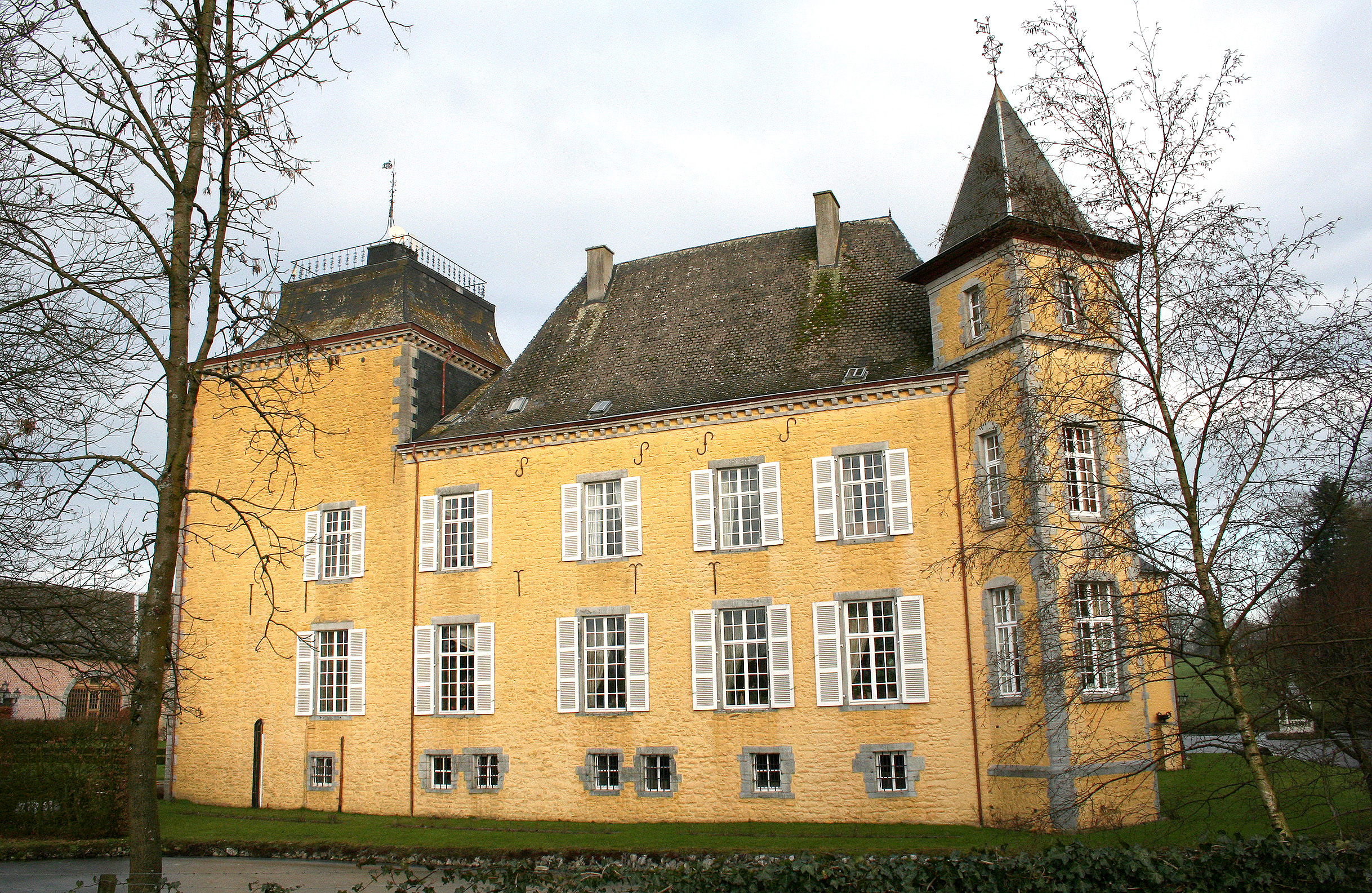
Château de Haversin

Haversin Castle (French: Château de Haversin) is a 17th-century château in the hamlet of Haversin, part of the village of Serinchamps in the municipality of Ciney, province of Namur, Wallonia, Belgium.

== See also ==
- List of castles in Belgium
- List of protected heritage sites in Ciney
