= Leignon Castle =

Castle in Wallonia, Belgium

Coordinates: 50.270727°N 5.110823°E

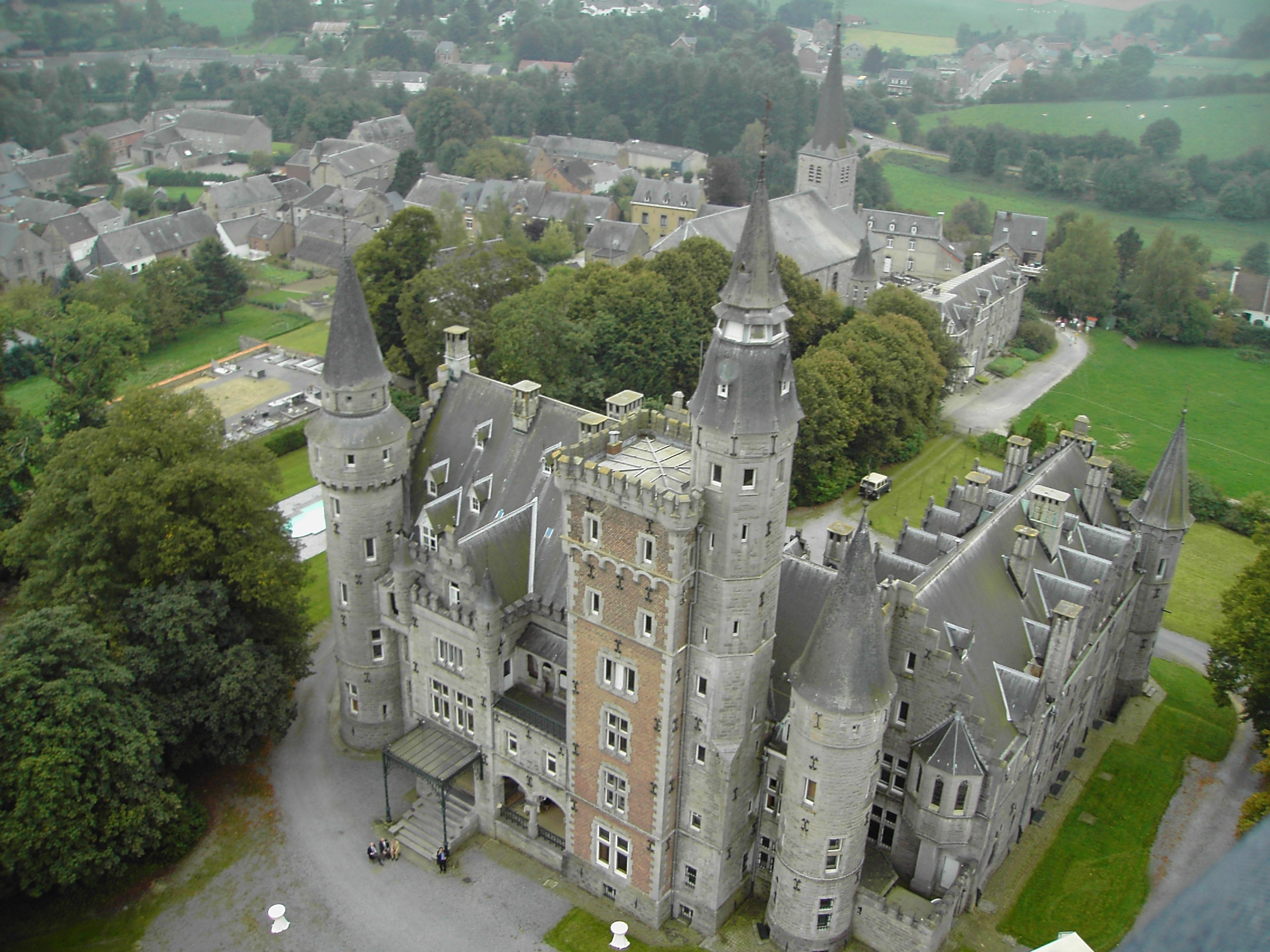
Leignon Castle from the air

Leignon Castle is a nineteenth century castle located in Wallonia, in the Namur province of Belgium, a few kilometers south of Ciney. It is a private castle with restricted access to the public.

== History ==
An old building existed prior to the construction of the castle. Located on a former field by Stavelot abbey, its origins may date back to the seventeenth century. Around 1890, Belgian diplomat and early photographer Isidore Jacques Eggermont acquired the castle with over 400 hectares of land, including farm land and woods. He then built a castle around the old building; hiring Belgian architect Auguste Van Assche for its design, after which the castle took its present form.
