= Operation Noah =

Operation Noah may refer to:

- Operation Noah's Ark (1944), a World War II plan instigated by the British Special Operations Executive to harass German troops as they withdrew from Greece
- Operation Noah (World War II), a 1944 reconnaissance operation by the Belgian Special Air Service
- Operation Noah (Kariba), a 1959 operation in Zambia and Zimbabwe to move animals from a flooding dam site
- Operation Noah's Ark, an Israeli military operation that seized a Palestinian vessel carrying 50 tons of weapons.
- Operation Noah (charity), a Christian charity campaigning on climate change.
