= Boxshall =

Boxshall is a surname. Notable people with the surname include:

- Charles Boxshall (1862–1924), Australian-born New Zealand cricketer
- Danny Boxshall (1920–2009), English footballer
- Edwin Boxshall (1897–1984), British intelligence officer, commercial representative, and government adviser
- Geoffrey Boxshall (born 1950), British zoologist
- Hugh Boxshall (born 2006), Australian rules footballer
