= Edwin Boxshall =

British intelligence officer (1897–1984)

- Born: Edwin George Boxshall; 4 February 1897; Bucharest, Kingdom of Romania
- Died: 26 January 1984 (aged 86); London, United Kingdom
- Other name: Eddie
- Occupations: Intelligence officer, commercial agent, SOE adviser
- Years active: 1916–1982
- Employers: Vickers Limited; Imperial Chemical Industries; Foreign Office
- Known for: Longest-serving British intelligence officer Custodian of SOE archives (1959–1982)
- Spouse: Elise Stirbey (m. 1920; div. 1947)
- Children: 1
- Military career
- Allegiance: United Kingdom
- Branch: British Army
- Service years: 1916–1919; 1940s (SOE)
- Rank: Lieutenant Colonel
- Unit: Special Operations Executive (SOE)
- Conflicts: First World War; Second World War
- Awards: MBE

Edwin George Boxshall (4 February 1897 – 26 January 1984) MBE was a British intelligence officer, commercial representative and adviser to the Foreign Office. He served in both the First and Second World Wars and played a prominent role in intelligence and commercial affairs related to Romania.

Described as one of the longest-serving officers in British intelligence history, he continued to advise MI6 and the Foreign Office well into his eighties.

== Biography ==
=== Early life and First World War ===
Edwin George Boxshall was born on 4 February 1897 in Bucharest, Romania, where his father, William, ran a small business importing tractors. His mother, Marie Meyer, was of German origin.

He was living in Bucharest at the outbreak of the First World War. Romania remained neutral at first but joined the Allies in August 1916. Following a rapid Central Powers offensive, Bucharest fell in December 1916 and much of the country came under occupation. The northeast around Iași remained unoccupied and served as the seat of the Romanian government.

Before the German occupation of the city, Boxshall came into contact with the British Secret Intelligence Service and served in a small intelligence unit under Mansfield Cumming, which included Captain Tom Laycock, Bertie Maw and W. A. Guthrie. Boxshall, who was half German and a native of Bucharest, helped coordinate espionage efforts against Bulgaria and manage the flow of reports from agents, including intelligence relayed from Constantinople.

He joined the British Military Mission in August 1917, holding the rank of second lieutenant, and continued intelligence work under the cover of the mission as German forces advanced. The team relocated to Iași, where Boxshall was tasked with gathering information on developments in Bessarabia and southern Russia, regions affected by the Russian Revolution and ensuing Russian Civil War. Captured by Bolshevik forces and detained at Hotin on the Dniester River, he was later freed by Allied forces and returned to Iași in late 1918. He was eventually evacuated to Britain via Murmansk.

=== Interwar intelligence and commercial work ===
In 1919, Boxshall returned to Bucharest as a commercial representative for Vickers Limited and Nobel Industries (later Imperial Chemical Industries). According to multiple sources, this position also served as cover for his activities as SIS (Secret Intelligence Service) Head of Station in Romania, where he operated under the auspices of British intelligence for roughly two decades. (Note: Some sources have described him as the MI6 station chief in Bucharest during the interwar period; this claim is disputed.)

Like many British agents in the interwar period, Boxshall worked under what SIS termed a "natural cover" arrangement, using his Vickers role to fund and disguise official intelligence operations. SIS (later known as MI6) had developed close relationships with firms such as Vickers, Shell and British American Tobacco, encouraging employees stationed abroad to collect information. In return, the companies were kept informed about the activities of their rivals and the local political climate. As Vickers' representative, Boxshall played a key role in strengthening the Bucharest bureau, which grew in importance following the loss of British networks in Soviet Russia. (Note: Vickers' close cooperation with the Secret Intelligence Service was noted in later accounts of the 1933 Metro-Vickers Affair espionage trial in Moscow, which was covered by a young Ian Fleming for Reuters News Agency.)

Under a liaison agreement with Romanian intelligence, Boxshall helped run joint operations into the Soviet Union, effectively concealing British involvement. He developed a wide network of influential contacts, including arms magnate Sir Basil Zaharoff, whose support helped legitimise his commercial role. Boxshall became Chief of the Armament Section at Reșița Steel Works, a major Romanian industrial firm (important for arms and metallurgy). During this time, he was instrumental in brokering military-industrial contracts, including the sale of submarine equipment to the Romanian Navy. He also gathered intelligence on the Balkans and the Soviet Union through contacts with agents, defectors, and refugees.

On 25 April 1920, he married Princess Elise Stirbey, known as "Madie", daughter of Barbu Știrbey, a prominent Romanian political figure and confidant of Queen Marie. The couple divorced in 1947. Boxshall remained in Romania throughout the interwar period and, after returning to Britain, continued to work in the Eastern European sections of MI6.

=== Second World War and SOE service ===
Type A Mk III suitcase radio used by SOE operatives. In 1941, a similar set was left in the residence of Prince Barbu Știrbey to maintain contact with Romania; Boxshall, then head of SOE's Romania desk, was closely involved in related operations.

During the Second World War, Boxshall was commissioned with the Special Operations Executive (SOE), holding the rank of lieutenant colonel. He served as the Romanian expert in SOE's Balkan section in London. In 1941, SOE's mission in Bucharest was withdrawn alongside the British diplomatic legation. The only contact subsequently maintained with Romania was through a wireless set left behind in the residence of Prince Barbu Știrbey, Boxshall's father-in-law. Boxshall managed communications with Iuliu Maniu, the Peasant Party leader. (Note: Romanian accounts also record Boxshall's involvement, alongside fellow British officer Tom Masterson, in maintaining contact with members of the exile organisation "Comitetul Democrat Român" (C.D.R.) in 1941, reflecting continued British intelligence liaison with Romanian opposition groups abroad.) In 1941, in addition to Romania, he assumed a supervisory position overseeing SOE operations in Greece, Crete, and Albania.

Boxshall's role was further constrained as SOE command shifted from London to forward bases in Cairo and Bari. Boxshall increasingly found key decisions made in the field, weakening the authority of the London Balkan desk during the later stages of the war. In March 1944, Boxshall travelled to Cairo to meet Știrbey, who was involved in armistice discussions between Romania and the Allies.

=== Later life and legacy ===
After SOE was disbanded at the end of the War, Boxshall rejoined the Secret Intelligence Service, overseeing intelligence and political developments in Eastern Europe. In 1959, he was appointed the first SOE Adviser to the Foreign and Commonwealth Office, (Note: Boxshall's private papers (a 235‑page SOE operations chronology) are held at the Imperial War Museum) tasked with advising on the release of information regarding wartime operations and handling public enquiries. His official remit was restrictive, and some observers believed his principal function was to prevent sensitive information from being released. Boxshall was succeeded as the Foreign Office's SOE Adviser by Christopher M. Woods followed by Gervase Cowell.

In 1960, Boxshall completed a classified chronology of SOE operations with the French Resistance. He later developed a deep personal interest in the 1944 Oradour-sur-Glane massacre, maintaining a file on the case from 1953 to 1971 and critically engaging with revisionist narratives that sought to downplay German culpability. Boxshall remained an adviser to British intelligence services well into his later years. In July 1979, The Daily Telegraph reported that the 82-year-old Boxshall was still at work in Whitehall, advising the Foreign Office on how much information about the wartime activities of the SOE should be made public. Boxshall was reportedly still being consulted at the time of his death in London on 26 January 1984. Intelligence historian Richard Bennett described Boxshall as "probably the longest serving officer in British intelligence history".

== Honours ==
Boxshall was appointed a Member of the Order of the British Empire (MBE) in the 1945 Birthday Honours. According to his entry in Who's Who in Central and East-Europe (1935), he received the British War Medal and held several foreign honours, including the Knight of the Order of the Crown of Romania (K.O.C.R.) and the Russian Order of St Anne.

== Military commissions ==
Boxshall was appointed temporary honorary second lieutenant on 11 August 1917, promoted to temporary honorary captain on 22 August 1919, and relinquished his commission on 1 October 1920 while retaining the honorary rank of captain.

He later received a wartime commission on the General List as a second lieutenant on 29 August 1941. Army List records show subsequent wartime promotions: to the war substantive rank of lieutenant (29 August 1941), temporary captain (29 November 1942), war substantive captain and temporary major (21 August 1942), and finally war substantive major and temporary lieutenant-colonel (1 November 1945).
