= List of protected heritage sites in Ciney =

This table shows an overview of the protected heritage sites in the Walloon town Ciney. This list is part of Belgium's national heritage.

| Object | Year/architect | Town/section | Address | Coordinates | Number^{?} | Image |
|---|---|---|---|---|---|---|
| Church of Saint-Nicolas ^{(nl)} ^{(fr)} | | Ciney | | 50.296683°N 5.100752°E | 91030-CLT-0001-01 | Kerk Saint-Nicolas More images |
| Ensemble of the Courtyard of Monseu ^{(nl)} ^{(fr)} | | Ciney | | 50.296359°N 5.099420°E | 91030-CLT-0002-01 | Ensemble van de binnenplaats Monseu |
| Expanding the site of the Courtyard of Monseu ^{(nl)} ^{(fr)} | | Ciney | | 50.296274°N 5.098809°E | 91030-CLT-0003-01 | Uitbreiding van de site van de binnenplaats van Monseu |
| Chapel of Notre-Dame de Hal ^{(nl)} ^{(fr)} | | Ciney | | 50.297619°N 5.099958°E | 91030-CLT-0004-01 | Kapel Notre-Dame de Hal |
| Chapel of Saint-Lambert and the forest that surrounds it ^{(nl)} ^{(fr)} | | Ciney | | 50.249052°N 5.218659°E | 91030-CLT-0005-01 | |
| Chapel of Saint-Lambert ^{(nl)} ^{(fr)} | | Ciney | | 50.248846°N 5.220061°E | 91030-CLT-0006-01 | |
| Church of St. Clement ^{(nl)} ^{(fr)} | | Ciney | | 50.266330°N 5.044594°E | 91030-CLT-0008-01 | Kerk Saint-Clément |
| Ensemble of two lime trees and a small chapel at a place called "Tronnoy" ^{(nl)} ^{(fr)} | | Ciney | | 50.317117°N 5.072756°E | 91030-CLT-0009-01 | |
| The facades and roofs of Haversin Castle and the ensemble of the castle and surrounding areas ^{(nl)} ^{(fr)} | | Ciney | | 50.249422°N 5.202533°E | 91030-CLT-0010-01 | De gevels en daken van de kasteelhoeve van Haversin en het ensemble van deze kasteelhoeve en de omliggende terreinen More images |
| Facades and roofs of the wooden farmhouse, with the exception of the 20th century brick barn on the right, and the blue slate and stone paving and the sidewalk outside the main facade ^{(nl)} ^{(fr)} | | Ciney | route de Barvaux n° 168 | 50.249689°N 5.201442°E | 91030-CLT-0011-01 | |
| Trinity Church and the cemetery wall and the ensemble of the building and cemetery ^{(nl)} ^{(fr)} | | Ciney | | 50.232111°N 5.234375°E | 91030-CLT-0012-01 | |
| A part of the old city walls with the tower ^{(nl)} ^{(fr)} | | Ciney | rue des Récollets | 50.298355°N 5.103125°E | 91030-CLT-0013-01 | Een deel van de oude wallen en de toren |
| Sainte-Madeleine Chapel and the cemetery wall, and the ensemble of the building and its surroundings ^{(nl)} ^{(fr)} | | Ciney | | 50.319932°N 5.102458°E | 91030-CLT-0014-01 | Kapel Sainte-Madeleine en de kerkhofmuur, en het ensemble van het gebouw en diens omgeving |
| Set consisting of cloistered homes ^{(nl)} ^{(fr)} | | Ciney | rue Anciaux n° 10; place Léopold II n° 5 & 6 | 50.297375°N 5.100630°E | 91030-CLT-0015-01 | Ensemble |
| Kiosk in the classified site of the Courtyard of Monseu ^{(nl)} ^{(fr)} | | Ciney | | 50.296418°N 5.099605°E | 91030-CLT-0019-01 | Kiosk in de geclassificeerde site van de binnenplaats van Monseu More images |
| Park Saint-Roch ^{(nl)} ^{(fr)} | | Ciney | | 50.289819°N 5.093447°E | 91030-CLT-0020-01 | Park Saint-Roch |
| Halloy Castle and the surrounding area including the park with trees, the farm of La Motte, the walled gardens and meadows ^{(nl)} ^{(fr)} | | Ciney | | 50.311207°N 5.071961°E | 91030-CLT-0021-01 | Kasteel van Halloy en het omliggende gebied met een park met bomen, de boerderij van La Motte, de ommuurde tuinen en weilanden |
| Castle Leignon: facades, roofs, ground floor of the main wing, stairwell, hallway on floor and chapel. Establishment of a protection zone around it. ^{(nl)} ^{(fr)} | | Ciney | | 50.270824°N 5.111061°E | 91030-CLT-0022-01 | Kasteel van Leignon: gevels, daken, begane grond van de hoofdvleugel, trappenhuis, hal op etage en kapel. Oprichting van een beschermingszone rondom. |
| The linden tree known as "Le tilleul de Conjoux," located in the hamlet of "Baraque de Conjoux". Establishment of a protection zone around it. | | Conneux | Baraque de Conjoux | 50.23666°N 5.06920°E | 91030-CLT-0023-01 | |

== See also ==
- List of protected heritage sites in Namur (province)
