= Isidore Jacques Eggermont =

Belgian diplomat and photographer

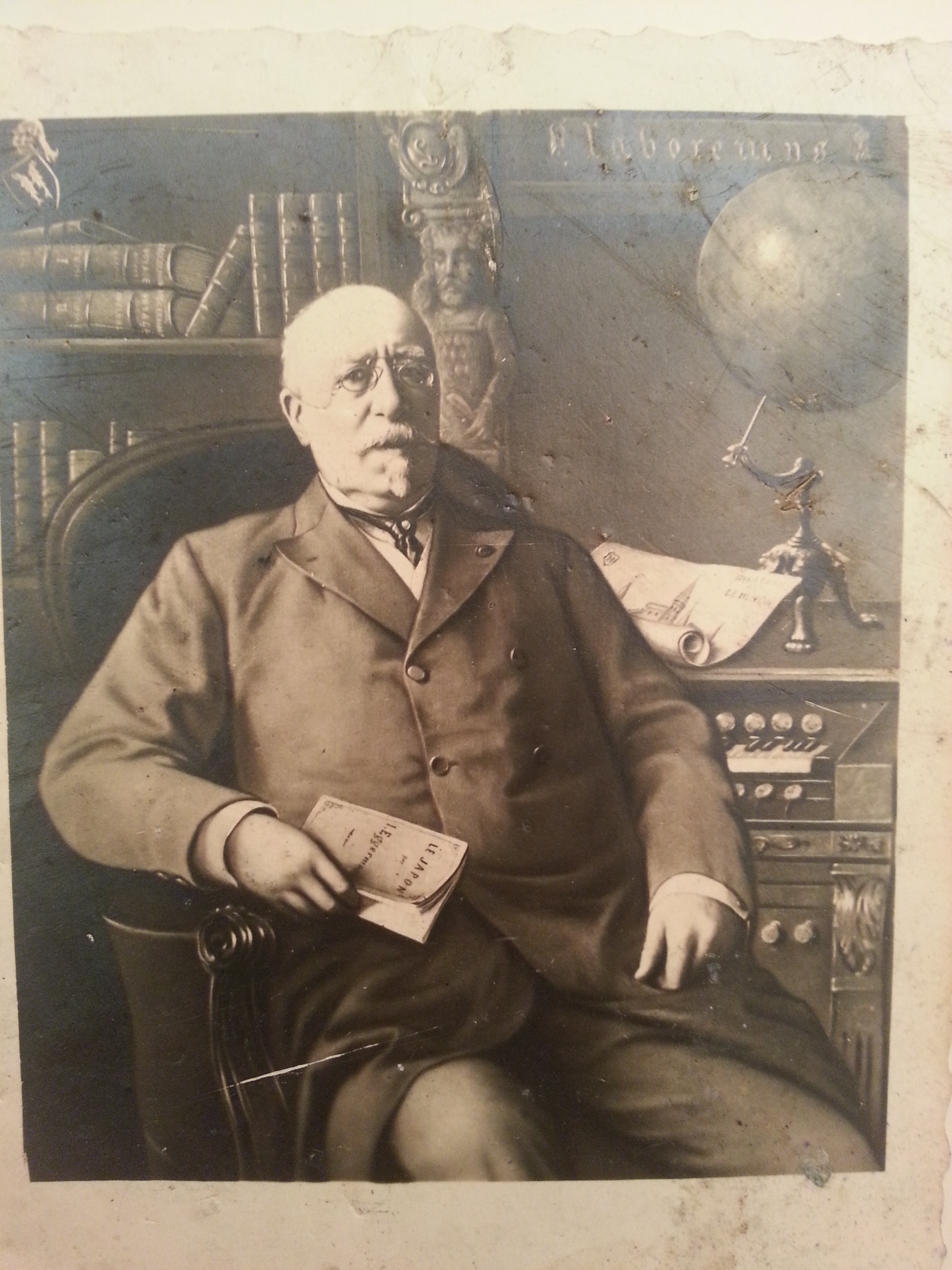
Isidore Eggermont

Isidore Jacques Eggermont (15 May 1844 – 16 April 1923) was a Belgian diplomat, who was also active as a photographer and writer in North Africa and Asia.

In 1874, Eggermont travelled to Egypt and Palestine and in 1876–1877, he travelled around the world. Possibly during the latter trip, Eggermont visited Ceylon (now Sri Lanka) and India. He was a councillor (conseiller, lower-grade diplomat) at the legation of Belgium in Japan, winter 1876–1877. He travelled extensively and took notes and photographs that were the basis of his later monographs on Japan. At the end of 1877, he was a secretary to the King of Belgium at Ghent. In 1885, he was first secretary of the legation of Belgium at Paris.

Several of his photographs are held by the Canadian Centre for Architecture in Montreal.

In 1890, he acquired the Leignon castle.

== Publications ==
- Exposition internationale de Philadelphie. Rapport sur l'Exposition universelle de Philadelphie au point de vue du commerce et de l'industrie belges, par l. Eggermont, .. Bruxelles: impr. de A. Mertens, 1877. In-8, 59 p. (a report about the world expo at Philadelphia from the view of Belgian commerce and industry )
- Le Japon, Histoire et Religion, par I. Eggermont, premier secretaire de la legation de belgique a Paris, Avec une nouvelle carte du Japon. Paris (Libraire Ch. Delegrave, 15 Rue Soufflot), 1885. 156 p., 1 leaf of plates 19 cm. ("Japan, History and Religion"). Title page and a complete table of contents are at International Research Center for Japanese Studies
- Eggermont, I.: Voyage autour du globe. L' Amérique. Paris (Delagrave) 1892. 366 p. ("Travel around the globe. America", but treats Canada and U.S. only. Some 200 wood engravings, 19 maps and plan)
- Eggermont, I.: Voyage autour du globe. Japon. Paris (Delagrave) 1900. Grand in-4. 522 p., 12 maps and plans within the paginated text. ("Travel around the globe. Japan") Some pictures and a complete table of contents are at International Research Center for Japanese Studies

The 1877 and 1900 books are among the essential contemporary French-language literature about 19th century Japan.
