= Operation Kestrel =

- Part of SOE operations and the Norwegian resistance movement
- Operational scope: Sabotage iron ore production
- Location: Fosdalen iron ore mines, Trøndelag, Norway
- Objective: Sabotage iron ore production
- Date: 16 September 1942 – 5 October 1942
- Executed by: Company Linge
- Outcome: Limited Success

Operation Kestral was a World War II mission conducted by a branch of the British Special Operations Executive (SOE) called Company Linge, which was a Norwegian group. The operation aimed to sabotage production at the Fosdalen iron ore mines.

== Background ==
During the occupation of Norway, Fosdalen was the only one of the larger Norwegian iron mines that extracted ore almost continuously. In total, just over 800,000 tonnes were exported to the German armour industry from Fosdalen. Several attempts were made to increase the breaking rate, but were never carried out, mainly due to a lack of materials and manpower. A number of Norwegians were forcibly discharged to work in the mines.

== The mission ==
=== Landing in Norway ===
Three SOE operatives from Company Linge; Per Getz, Torleif Grong and Leif Well departed from the Shetland Islands by sea on September 16, 1942. They arrived in the northwest part of Vikna Municipality three days later. They tried several times to get into mainland Norway, and with the help of the lighthouse keeper's assistant at Nordøyan Lighthouse landed in Flatanger Municipality. On October 5, the group made their way to the mine where they placed charges and firebombs in the engine house that caused damage to the mine's production.

=== Aftermath ===
Production at the Fosdalen mine was reduced by twenty-five percent for two months. After the sabotage, all three men managed to escape to Sweden.
