= Leignon =

Village of Wallonia, Belgium

Coordinates: 50.2687°N 5.11°E

Leignon (French pronunciation: [lɛɲɔ̃]; Walloon: Legnon) is a village of Wallonia and a district of the municipality of Ciney, located in the province of Namur, Belgium. It was a municipality itself until the fusion of the municipalities in 1977.

It is served by its own railway station, on the Namur - Arlon - Luxembourg line. The next station to the north is Ciney and the next station to the south-east is Chapois.

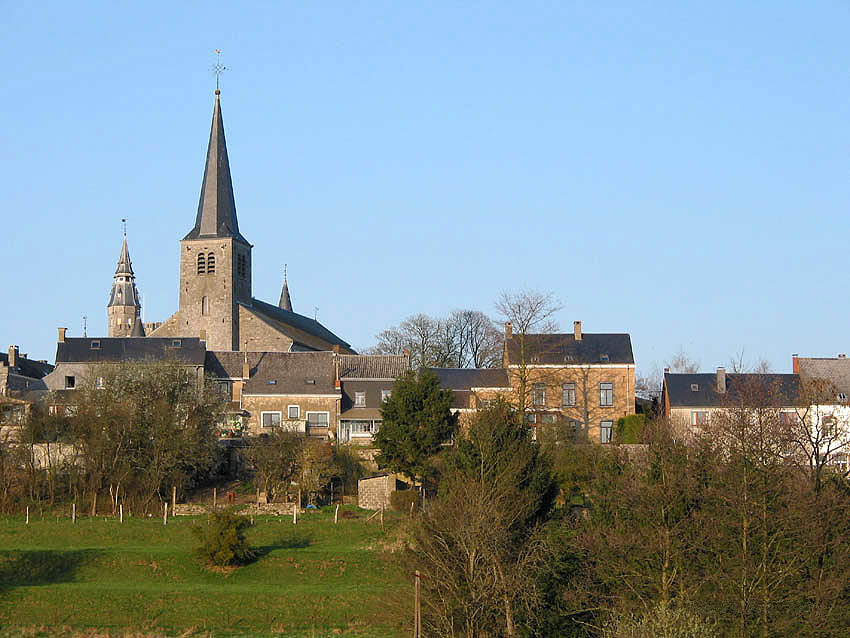
View at Leignon

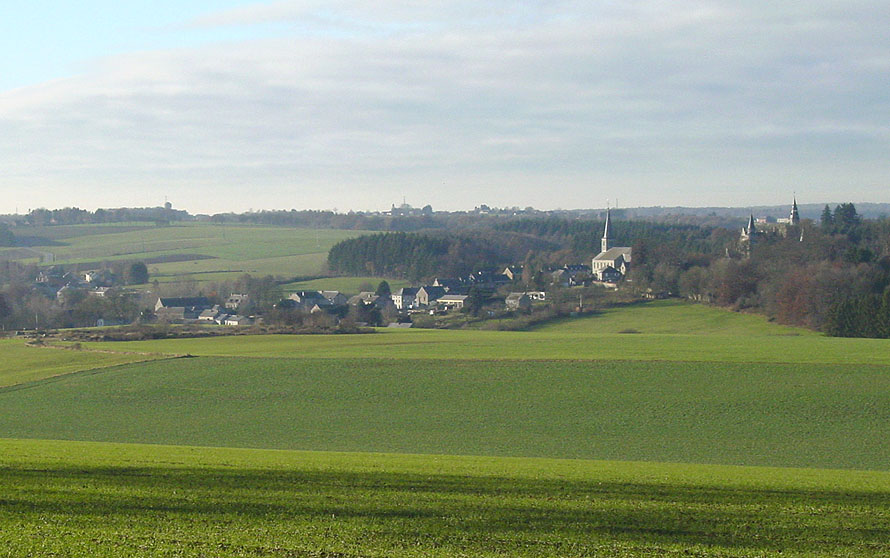
View of Leignon across the fields

== See also ==
- Chapois
