= Chapois, Belgium =

Village in Ciney, Belgium

Coordinates: 50.26158°N 5.13001°E

Chapois (French pronunciation: [ʃapwa]) is a village of Wallonia, part of the district of Leignon in the municipality of Ciney, located in the province of Namur, Belgium.

Chapois is twinned with a village of the same name, Chapois in France.

It is served by its own railway station, on the Namur - Arlon - Luxembourg line. The next station to the north-west is Leignon and the next station to the east is Haversin.

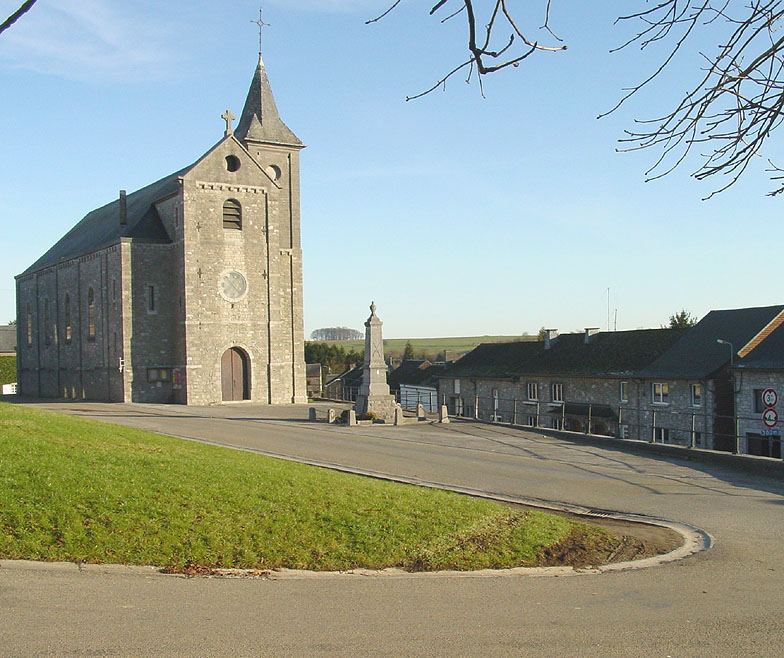
Chapois church

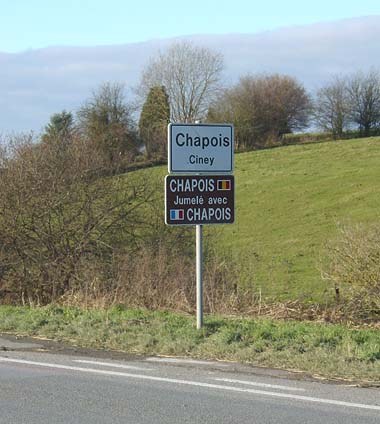
Chapois twinned with Chapois in France

== See also ==
- Leignon
