= William Verner Longe =

English painter

William Verner Longe (31 May 1857 - 19 September 1924) was an English painter, best known for his paintings of horses.

== Biography ==
Longe was born the son of Revd John Longe (1832–1916) and his wife Maria Elizabeth Verner née Martin. Longe was educated at Ipswich School, Ipswich School of Arts and Royal Academy of Fine Arts Antwerp.

He was married at Brandeston, Suffolk on 5 January 1905 to Marjory Brooke (born 4 October 1881), daughter of Reginald Brooke and his wife, Jane Austin of Brandeston Hall, Suffolk and granddaughter of Francis Capper Brooke (1810–1886).

William died at Springfield House, Ipswich on 19 September 1924, aged 67 and his wife died in 1949, aged 77.

== List of artworks ==
- ‘’Finish for the National’’ (1902)
- ‘’The Finish Fir The Derby Sir Hugo’s Year’’ (1892)
- Polly (1881)
- Sunrise on the Sea (1881)
- Stranded (1881)
- A Winter Evening (1881)
- Early Morning (1881)
- A Winter Moon (1881)
- A Hunting Sketch (1882)
- A Portrait (1882)
- Blackheath, near Aldeburgh (1882)
- The Keeper's Cottage, Sternfield (1882)
- In Perils of Waters (1882)
- Hunting Sketch (1883)
- The Lowing Herd (1889)
- Late with the Rising Moon (1889)
- Fruit (1889)
- Watching (1889)
- The Cottenham Races (1891)
- The Princess of Wales stakes (1896)
- The Grand National (1896)
- The Gold Cup, Ascot (1897)
- Prince of Wales’s horse Diamond Jubilee winner of the 2000 guineas, the Derby and the St Leger in 1900.
- The last fence - the Grand National (1902)
- The Finish of the St Leger (1904)
- The Grand National (1912)
- Flies (1923)
- The Last Days of the Old Inn, Slaughden (1923)
- Haysel Time (1923)
- The Two Thousand Guineas (1923)
