= Skanifest =

Skanifest was a punk, ska and rock festival organized in Ciney, Belgium from 2005 until 2009. The festival's aim was to host rock, ska and punk bands at fair prices. The Skanifest ASBL (non-profit organisation) was dissolved in 2010.

Each year, Skanifest tried to mix local groups starting out, more experienced local bands and artists with national, or even international, experience.

== 2005 Edition ==
The first edition (15 April 2005) gathered around 400 people. This was the line-up:

- Wash Out Test(Be)
- Gino's Eyeball (Be)
- Mad Men's Team (Be)
- Fucking Peanuts (Be)
- BP Buckshot(Be)
- Bilo Band (Be)

== 2006 Edition ==
The second edition (25 March 2006) was attended by around 1000 people. The line-up was:

- Vic Ruggiero (The Slackers, ex Rancid) (USA)
- The Moon Invaders (Be)
- PO Box (Fr)
- Skating Teenagers (Be)
- Mad Men's Team (Be)
- Shadocks (Be)
- BP Buckshot (Be)
- Bilo Band (Be)

== 2007 Edition ==
The third edition took place in "Salle Cecoco", Ciney, Belgium on 27 January 2007.

This was the line up:

- Capdown (UK)
- Joshua (B)
- Sweek (B)
- Camping Sauvach' (B)
- Skafield (DE)
- PO Box (Fr)
- BP Buckshot (B)

== 2008 Edition ==
On 5 April 2008.

- The Locos (ES)
- La Ruda (FR)
- The Experimental Tropic Blues Band (B)
- PO Box (Fr)
- Atomic Leaf (B)
- Elvis Black Stars (B)

== 2009 Edition ==
The fifth edition took place in "Ciney Expo", Ciney, Belgium on 6 February 2009.

This was the line up:

- Joshua (B)
- Reel Big Fish (USA)
- Malibu Stacy (B)
- Camping Sauvach (B)
- Suburban Legends (USA)
- Sinus Georges (B)
- Les Caricoles (B)
