= Operation Chaffinch =

MISSION DURING WORLD WAR 2

- Part of SOE operations and the Norwegian resistance movement
- Operational scope: Shipping sabotage and resistance training
- Location: Norway
- Objective: Contact and train Milorg fighters and sabotage shipping in the Oslo area
- Date: January–May 1943
- Executed by: Company Linge
- Outcome: Limited Success

Operation Chaffinch was a World War II mission conducted by a branch of the British Special Operations Executive (SOE) called Company Linge, which was a Norwegian group. The operation aimed to make contact with local resistance groups in the Oslo area and to sabotage shipping. The operation succeeded in sinking the merchant vessel Sanev on 19 May 1943.

== Background ==
As preparation for an invasion in Scandinavia in 1944, SOE began to attack industrial targets and coastal shipping in German occupied Norway. Norwegian resistance movements such as Milorg were working together with the British SOE against the Nazi occupation. Operations had already been conducted in Norway to damage the German war effort. Fish oil factories that used gylcorel in explosives had already been targeted by the British as early as 1940 and other missions had been carried out against the German nuclear program and to damage train lines.

== The mission ==
=== Landing in Norway, contacting the Resistance ===
Three SOE operatives from Company Linge; Tor Sternersen, Martin Olsen and wireless telegrapher Oddvar Sandersen dropped into Norway on 23 January 1943. They made contact with Milorg and set up 4 'X-groups', which were groups of six men trained in silent killing, especially the elimination of informers. These groups were organised by Milorg and trained by the Chaffinch operatives. The group also acted as a direct line of communication between Milorg and the UK.

=== Ship sabotage ===
The trio initially considered attacking two destroyers stationed in Horten Harbour on 14 May. They decided against this idea and instead chose to target a ship docked at Moss. On 19 May 1943, they attached a limpet mine to the freighter Sanev while it was docked there. The mine detonated on the same day, sinking the nearly 2,000 long tons (2,000 t) ship to sink. A later attempt to attack shipping in the Oslo harbour was abandoned.

=== Aftermath ===
All three men left Norway at the end of May 1943 and escaped to Sweden.
