= Spixworth Park =

Spixworth Hall
- View of Spixworth Hall (demolished in 1952)

- Location within Norfolk

General information
- Type: Country house
- Architectural style: Elizabethan
- Location: Spixworth, Norfolk, England
- Coordinates: 52.6796°N 1.3073°E
- Completed: 1607
- Demolished: 1952

Spixworth Hall was an Elizabethan country house in the civil parish of Spixworth in Norfolk, located just north of the city of Norwich on the Buxton Road. It was demolished in 1952.

== Location ==
The house was located in Spixworth, close to the Buxton Road. It was 5 miles (8.0 km) north of Norwich and some 10 miles (16.1 km) south of North Walsham.

== History ==
The house was constructed by William Peck in 1607. The park was 200 acres, which ran parallel to the present Buxton Road. The complete estate was in excess of 2,000 acres (8.1 km^{2}) situated on the edge of Norwich, with land bordering the present Norwich International Airport. Both Longe Road and William Peck Road are named in honour of the former owners of Spixworth Hall.

The Longe family, who were considerable land owners (owning Reymerston Hall, Norfolk, Hingham Hall, Norfolk, Dunston Hall, Norfolk, Abbot's Hall, Stowmarket, and Yelverton Hall, Norfolk), bought the estate from the Pecks in 1685. Spixworth Hall and the surrounding parkland remained in the Longe family for 257 years until 1952, when it was demolished.

In 1920, the house was tenanted by Maud and Reginald Gurney of Gurney's Bank in Norwich, who had recently moved from Earlham Hall. Many buildings of the former estate still remain, including the gate house, dove cote, stable block and the ice house. The Longe family were traditionally clergymen and lawyers.

The house's library consisted of one of the most extensive collections of first-edition books of any stately home in the UK, with works by William Shakespeare, Charles Dickens and Miquel de Cervantes. As was fashionable with large households, records show that the Longe family kept animals, including a large monkey who used to live in the stable block, and a bear who lived in the butler's cottage and the wine cellar. The Lordship of the Manor is still held by the Longe family, as well as much of the surrounding parkland.

There are in existence, but now dispersed, a number of paintings of notable Bacons and Longes, perhaps the most famous being the Gainsborough portrait of the Longe family in Spixworth Park. This must have been painted before 1788, since that is the year in which Gainsborough of Sudbury died. The superb Temple cabinet which housed Sir William Temple's old medals and seals stood in the library. Another treasure was Dorothy Osborne's plain gold engagement ring engraved ‘the love I owe I cannot showe’. Sir William Temple of Moor Park was married to Dorothy Osborne, and they were close friends of the Longes. Until 1787, when it was unbricked, an alcove in the gallery contained the ‘soul’ of Sir William Peck. Documents do not state when this act occurred, but it is documented that Sir William desired this ‘bricking up’ to save his soul from adversaries.

== Longe family ==
The house, from the south drive

The Longe family are believed to have settled in Norfolk prior to 1299, with reference being made to both Robert le Longe and John le Longe who were traders of saltpetre in Norwich and the City of London. The family are notably descended from William of Wykeham, Chancellor of England and Bishop of Winchester, from which much of the family wealth can be attributed. Another branch of the family settled in Suffolk in the 1300s with Walterus le Longe and Rogerus le Longe both mentioned as bailiffs in Dunwich, Suffolk, in 1332 and 1333. The family is a senior branch of the House of Longe.

In 1619, the Longe family purchased estates of Reymerston Hall and later Spixworth Hall in 1685 and Dunston Hall in 1859. In 1903, the Suffolk branch purchased Abbot's Hall in Stowmarket, Suffolk which is now the Museum of East Anglian Life. A number of the family served as High Sheriffs of Norfolk and Suffolk. In 2011, the will of Thomas Longe of Ashwellthorpe was discovered, giving historians the first positive identification of a common soldier fighting for the House of York during the Battle of Bosworth.

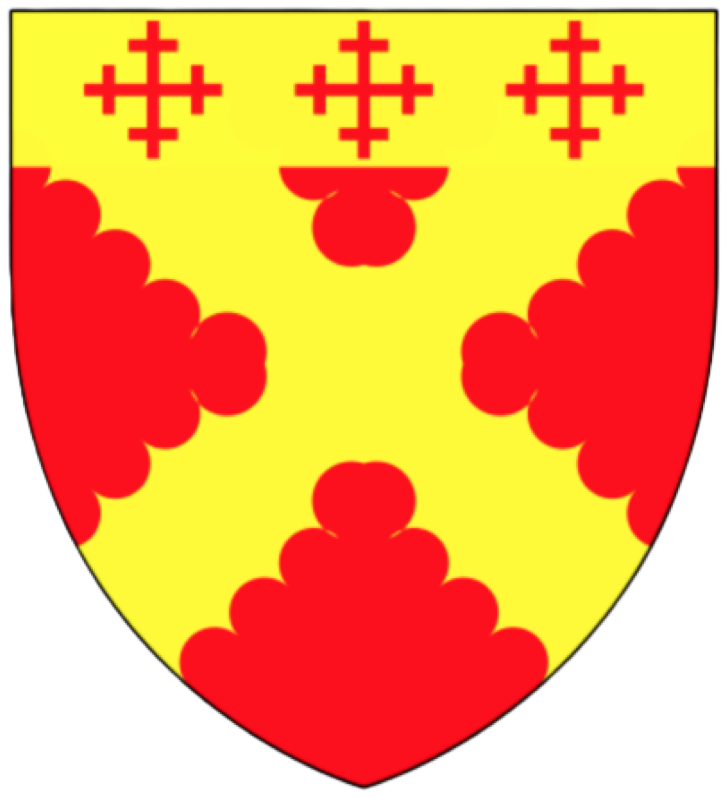
Arms of Longe of Spixworth Hall, Norfolk

=== High Sheriffs of Norfolk ===
- 1641 - Robert Longe (1588-1656), of Reymerston Hall.
- 1644 - Robert Longe (1619-1688), of Foulden, Norfolk.
- 1752 - Francis Longe (1726-1776), of Spixworth Hall.
- 1757 - Isreal Longe, of Dunston Hall, Admitted to Corpus Christi College, Cambridge in 1656 and Middle Temple in 1756.
- 1786 - Francis Longe (1748-1812), of Spixworth Hall.
- 1975 - Major Desmond Longe (1914-1990), of Woodton Grange, Norfolk.

=== High Sheriffs of Suffolk ===
- 1984 - Nicholas Longe of Grange Farm, Hasketon, Woodbridge.

=== Descent of the senior Norfolk branch ===
The descent of the Norfolk branch of the Longe family of Hingham and latterly Spixworth Hall and Reymerston Hall is as follows:

- William of Wykeham (1320-1404), Bishop of Winchester and Chancellor of England.
- Thomas of Aswellthorpe (d.1485) Lord of Aswellthorpe. Joined the army of Richard III in the Battle of Bosworth. Follower of Thomas Howard, Earl of Surrey and John Howard, Duke of Norfolk.
- John of Hingham (d. 1546)
  - William (d. 1557; second son)
    - John (1558-1622; elder son)
      - Robert (1588-1656). Sheriff of Norfolk 1640-41. Admitted to Gonville and Caius College, Cambridge in 1599. Migrated to Trinity Hall, Cambridge, as scholar, 06 Jul., 1603. Graduated with LL.B in 1606. Admitted at Lincoln's Inn, 17 November 1607.
        - Robert (1619-1688). High Sheriff of Norfolk 1644. Educated at Gonville and Caius College, Cambridge, matriculated 15 December 1612. Married 2ndly Elizabeth, daughter of Francis Bacon and 3rdly Frances, daughter Edmund Gourney.
          - Francis (d.1734; son) Purchased the estates of Spixworth Park, Norfolk.
            - Francis (1689-1735)
              - Francis (1726-1776; son). High Sheriff of Norfolk 1752. Educated at Westminster School and Emmanuel College, Cambridge.
              - Francis (1748-1812; son). High Sheriff of Norfolk 1786. Married Katharine, 2nd daughter of Sir George Jackson, Bt. Catherine later inherited the Camp Estate in St Paul Capisterre, Saint Kitts from Gen. Charles Leigh, housing 66 slaves.
              - Rev. John (1731-1806). Educated at Eton College and Magdalene College, Cambridge. Matriculates 1748-9; B.A. 1752; M.A. 1756. Chaplain to George III.
                - Rev. John (1765-1834).
                  - John (1799-1872; succeeded his cousin Francis).
                  - Rev. Robert (1800-1890; brother).
                    - Robert Bacon (1830-1911; eldest son) J.P., Captain of the Norfolk Artillery Militia.
                      - Col. Francis Bacon (1856-1922; eldest son) C.B. J.P, Surveyor-Gen. of India 1904-1911.
                      - Rev. John Charles (1859-1939; brother) Holder of the Royal Humane Society bronze medal (1887). Married Constance Sullivan, daughter of Col. George Sullivan, direct descendant of Oliol Ollum. Educated at Sherborne School and Jesus College, Cambridge. Ordained deacon (Worcester) 1882; priest, 1883; C. of Upton-on-Severn, Worcs., 1882-7. V. of Linton, Cambs., 1887–1905, R. of Catton with Stamford Bridge, Yorks., 1905–19, R. of Yelverton with Alpington, Norfolk, 1919–39. Holder of Royal Humane Society bronze medal (1887) for saving life.
                        - John Norman Sulivan (1899-unknown; son) O.B.E.
                        - Robert Bernard (1900-unknown; brother), Gen. Manager of Enemy Plantations and Property of British Cameroons 1939.
                          - Geoffrey Norman Bacon (1934-2010; son) married Baroness Katharina Helene Gisela von Cramm, elder daughter of Baron Burgard Rudolf Herbert von Cramm-Nehrstedt, relation to Baron Gottfried von Cramm.
                            - Edward Geoffrey Bacon (1968-; son)
                          - John Michael (1942-)
                          - Andrew Bernard (1945-)
                        - Francis Douglas Orman (1909-1987)
                          - Francis James (1959-)
                            - Francis William (2002-)
                        - Major Desmond Evelyn (1914-1990) M.C., D.L.

=== Other notable members of the Longe family ===
- John Longe (1549–1589), Archbishop of Armagh and member of the Privy Council of Ireland.
- Rev. Robert Longe (1800-1873), Landscape artist.
- Richard Longe (d. 1650), Royalist and Sheriff of Bristol 1621; Mayor 1636 and MP in 1640.
- Francis Davy Longe (1831-1910), First-class cricketer, descendant of Pocahontas.
- Henrietta Charlotte Longe, youngest daughter of Robert Bacon Longe J.P., married Charles Arthur Bathurst Bignold, great-grandson of Thomas Bignold, founder of the Norwich Union Fire Insurance Company.
- William Verner Longe (1857-1924), artist.
- Vera Mabel Wilhelmina Longe (1904-1985), Artist and co-founder of The Stowmarket Art Club and donator of Abbot's Hall and 18/20 Crowe Street, Stowmarket which is now the Museum of East Anglian Life.
