= Erwin Drèze =

Belgian cartoonist (1960–2020)

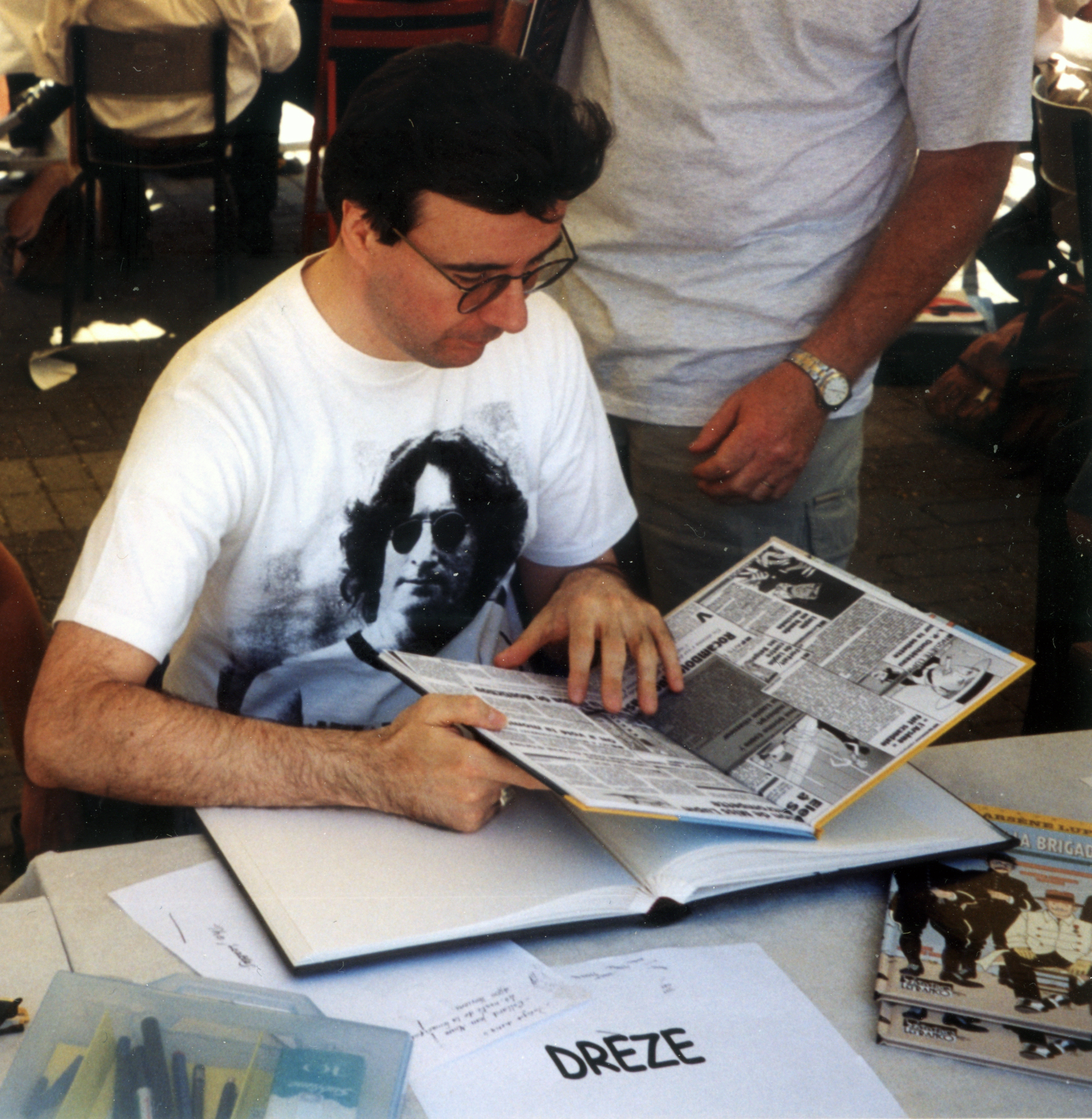
- Born: 27 November 1960; Ciney, Belgium
- Died: 18 March 2020 (aged 59)
- Occupation: Comic book artist

Erwin Drèze (27 November 1960 – 18 March 2020) was a Belgian comic book artist.

== Biography ==
Drèze began his career at Studios Aidans and produced comic strips for the newspaper Vers future before switching to Tintin with the series Louis Valmont. In the 1990s, he adapted the comic strip Arsène Lupine for André-Paul Duchâteau of Soleil Productions. In 2001, he met Jacques Martin, and together they developed the comic strips Lefranc (2006) and Les Voyages d'Alix (2008).

Erwin Drèze died of a brain tumor on 18 March 2020 at the age of 59.
