= John Longe (priest) =

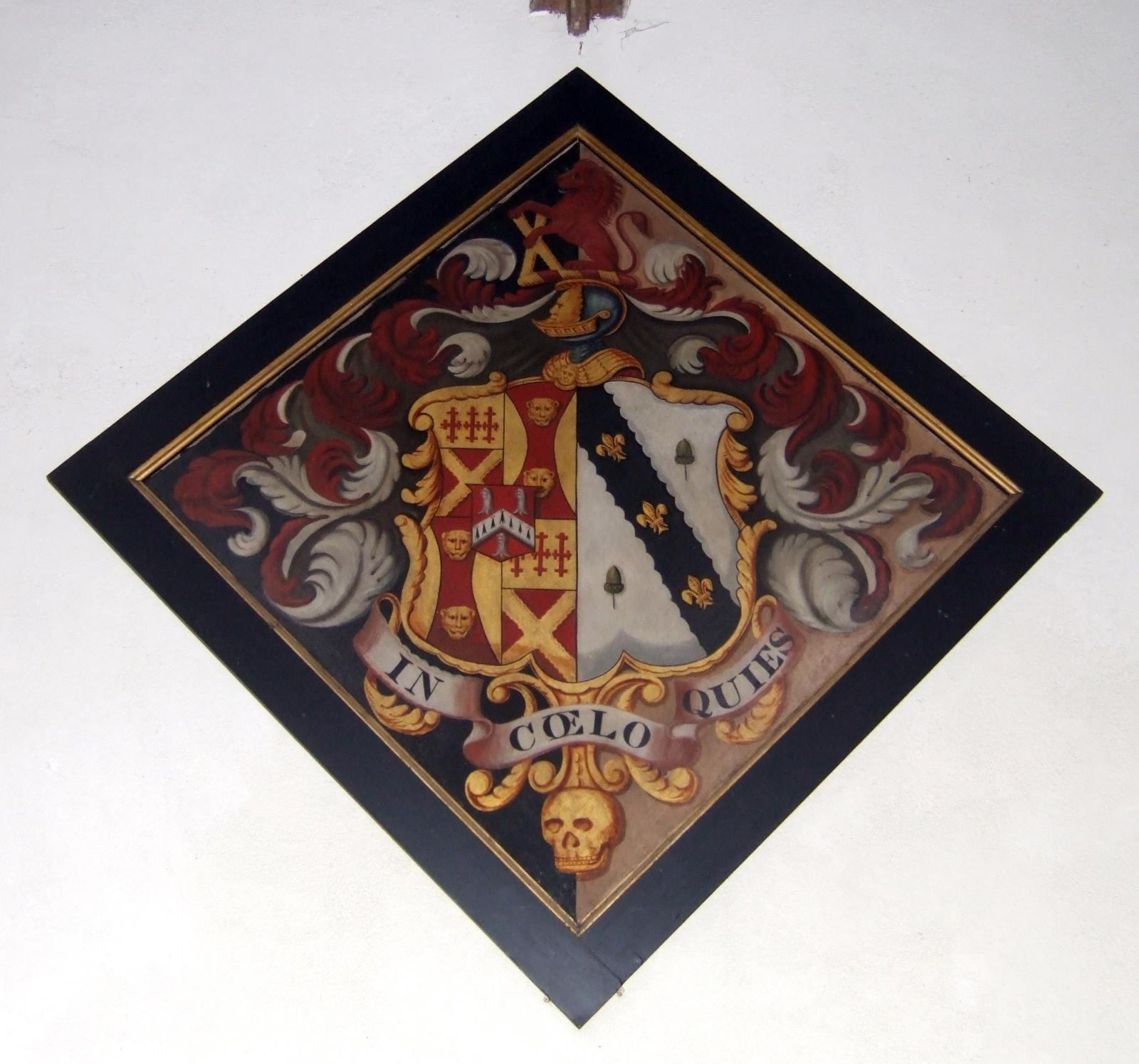
Funeral hatchment of Rev John Longe in St Mary's Church, Coddenham, Suffolk

Rev John Longe (6 April 1765 – 3 March 1834) was a priest and county magistrate.

== Background ==
Longe was born the son of the Rev. John Longe (b. 25 July 1731 - d. 18 September 1806) of Spixworth Park, chaplain to George III and his wife, Dorothy Elwin. Longe was educated at King Edward VI Grammar School, Corpus Christi College, Cambridge and Trinity College, Cambridge.

== Career ==
Longe served as vicar of Coddenham. In 1787, Longe was ordained deacon and curate to his father at Spixworth. In 1789, Longe was ordained priest at Norwich Cathedral. Longe also served as a county magistrate.

== Work ==
- A sermon preached at the primary visitation.
- The diary of John Longe (1765–1834), vicar of Coddenham.

== Personal life ==
He married Charlotte Browne (1761–1812) and had four sons:

1. Francis Bacon Longe (b. 1 June 1798 – d. 17 January 1819). Died whilst an undergraduate at Trinity College, Cambridge.

2. John Longe (b. 14 July 1799 – d. 27 September 1872). Married Caroline Elizabeth Warneford (1792–1846) in 1829.

3. Robert Longe (b.6 November 1800 – d. 27 January 1890). Married Margaret Douglas Davy (1802–1873) in 1828.

4. Henry Browne Longe (b. 17 March 1803 – d ( 1883 ). Married Anne Margaret Nicholson (1813–1910) in 1836
