= Lung (disambiguation) =

A lung is a primary organ of the respiratory system in humans and most other animals.

Lung or lungs may also refer to:

== Arts and entertainment ==
- Lungs (album), by Florence and the Machine, 2009
- Lungs (EP), by Big Black, 1982
- "Lungs", a song by Chvrches from the 2013 album The Bones of What You Believe
- "Lungs", a single by Allday, 2019
- "The Lung", a song by Dinosaur Jr. from the 1987 album You're Living All Over Me
- Lungs (play), by Duncan Macmillan, 2011
- "Lungs", a song by Townes Van Zandt from his 1969 eponymous album

== People ==
- Carole Frances Lung (born 1966), an American artist and labor activist, known for her performance art
- Daniel Lung (born 1987), Romanian footballer
- James Lung (born 1974), Hong Kong politician
- Kasing Lung (born 1972), Hong Kong illustrator and toy designer
- Patrick Lung (1934–2014), film director from Hong Kong
- Lung Chien (1916–1975), also known as Kim Lung, Chinese film director and screenwriter
- Lung Ying-tai (born 1952), Taiwanese essayist and cultural critic

== Places ==
- Lung, Nepal
- Lung, Tibet
- Lung (river), a river in Ireland
- Lungs, County Tyrone, a townland in County Tyrone, Northern Ireland

== Other uses ==
- Lung (Chinese medicine), a zang organ described in traditional Chinese medicine
- Lung (Tibetan Buddhism), meaning wind or breath
- Chinese dragon, also known as loong, long, or lung
  - Radical 212 (龍), transliterated as lung in some systems

== See also ==
- Breathing apparatus
- Long (Western surname)
