= Desmond Longe =

British Army Major

Desmond Evelyn Longe
- Born: Desmond Evelyn Longe; 8 August 1914; Norfolk, England
- Died: 19 February 1990 (age 75 years)
- Other name: Refraction (codename)
- Military career
- Allegiance: United Kingdom; France
- Branch: British Army; Special Operations Executive
- Service years: 1939–1945
- Rank: Major
- Service number: 156248
- Unit: Norfolk Regiment
- Commands: Commander of Mission Eucalyptus
- Conflicts: World War II
- Awards: Military Cross; War Medal 1939-1945; 1939-1945 Star; High Sheriff of Norfolk; Deputy Lieutenant of Norfolk

Major Desmond Evelyn Longe, MC, DL, (8 August 1914 – 19 February 1990) was a British Army Major, S.O.E agent and Commander of the Inter-Allied mission, Eucalyptus.

== Early life and family ==
Longe was born the son of the Rev. Charles Longe of Spixworth Park, Norfolk, England and educated at Woodbridge School, Suffolk. Longe worked as a bank clerk in Jamaica before spending the majority of his wartime service in West Africa, India and Vassieux-en-Vercors in the department of Drôme in southeastern France.

== World War II ==
During the war, Longe served in the British Army as part of the clandestine Special Operations Executive (SOE). He served in West Africa, Middle East, Far East and North Western Europe. Longe was the commander of the Inter-Allied Mission Eucalyptus.

=== Mission Eucalyptus ===
In 1944, Longe was named commander of the Inter-Allied Mission codenamed "Eucalyptus." On the night of 28/29 June 1944, Longe and his team parachuted into a field in the French commune of Vassieux-en-Vercors in the department of Drôme in southeastern France. Their task was to train the Maquis (rural resistance fighters) of the Vercors Massif in the use of parachuted weapons and in guerrilla-style combat as well as seeking suitable landing and parachute drop zones for airborne operations. The mission comprised Commander, Major Desmond Longe and his second in command, John Houseman (codename: 'Reflection'), a former estate agent. Also aiding the mission were three subsequent officers, including 2 radio officers: Franco-American OSS agent, Andre Pecquet (codename: 'Paray') and Frenchman, Phillipe Saillard (codename: 'Touareg'). Longe located the mission near Saint-Martin-en-Vercors on 10 July 1944 where it was strengthened by three French officers, including Adrien Conus.

Eucalyptus immediately ran into difficulty. The SOE leader in southeastern France, Francis Cammaerts, was furious that Longe and his team had been sent to Vercors without his knowledge and permission. Moreover, Longe spoke little French and Houseman none, which limited their usefulness. The training of the maquis by Longe and others and air drops of arms and supplies proved inadequate when the German army launched an all-out attack on the Vercos Massif on 21 July and the maquis were quickly defeated and dispersed. After a few days hiding out in the forests, Longe and Houseman with maquis guides began a trek on foot to Switzerland and safety, crossing the border on 11 August. After their escape, rumors circulated that Longe and Houseman had fled in the face of the enemy. Longe demanded a court of inquiry which decided that his behavior had been appropriate and justified. However, Cammaerts refused to apologize for having said Longe "ran away."

Major Desmond Longe, Commander of Mission Eucalyptus

== Honours and awards ==
On 19 July 1945, Longe was awarded the Military Cross by King George VI for gallantry during active operations against the enemy.

Military Cross	1939–1945 Star	War Medal	Croix de guerre avec palme 1939–1945

== Personal life ==
Longe served as President of Norwich Union Insurance in the 1970s and later chairman in 1980. Longe was appointed High Sheriff of Norfolk in 1975. In 1980, Longe served as President of the Royal Norfolk Show. Longe was appointed as Director of Schiedam Insurance, Netherlands and Director of Scottish Union and National Insurance Co.

== Books ==
Longe has been mentioned in the following books:

- Setting France Ablaze: The SOE in France During WWII (by Peter Jacobs)
- A Pacifist at War: The Silence of Francis Cammaerts (by Ray Jenkins)
- Fighters in the Shadows: A New History of the French Resistance (by Robert Gildea)
- Vercors 1944: Resistance in the French Alps (by Peter Lieb)
- In Search of the Maquis: Rural Resistance in Southern France 1942-1944 (by H. R. Kedward)
