= Operation Periwig =

1944–45 British secret service operation in Germany

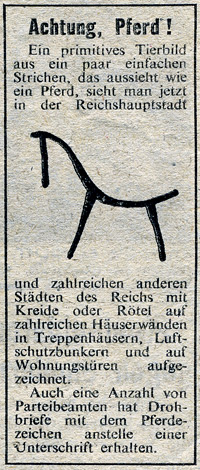
Extract from an article in the German Wehrmacht magazine Nachrichten für die Truppe from 7 February 1945. The caption reads (translated): "Watch out, horse!"

Operation Periwig was a secret service operation planned and carried out by the British Special Operations Executive (SOE) from November 1944 onwards during the Second World War. The aim was to disrupt the Nazi regime by feigning resistance movements within the German territory.

== Background ==
At the beginning of the war, the British secret service was aware that it was practically impossible to establish a real resistance movement in Germany. Due to the almost insurmountable surveillance by the German security organs, it was considered hopeless to attempt creating such a complex structure, especially since all British agents deployed in Germany were exposed and arrested at the beginning of the war.

== Planning ==
In cooperation with the Political Warfare Executive (PWE) and the Secret Intelligence Service (SIS), a plan was made to invent a suitable resistance movement. This measure was intended to involve the German security organs in practically useless activities tracking down the fictitious resistance fighters. The intention was to create confusion and tie up important resources. It was also hoped — after something had possibly been leaked among the German population about such resistance movements — a few courageous Germans would actually support these activities.

=== November 1944 proposals ===
In November 1944 the planning group of Operation Periwig had eight scenarios for a hypothetical resistance movement. Groups of people within the Wehrmacht, the party and police, the Catholic Church, industrialists, industrial and mining workers, foreign workers, separatists and members of the Reichsbahn were considered possible resistance fighters.

The Wehrmacht resistance movement was to be assigned its headquarters in Berlin. Gdańsk, Dresden, Hamburg, Nuremberg and other important cities in Germany were chosen as further locations for resistance cells. All cells were to be connected through regular Wehrmacht and personal contact. The office of the Wehrmacht resistance movement in London, under British control, would be in constant contact with the headquarters in Berlin. Two selected German prisoners of war would be able to carry out activities in Germany between the individual cells and communicate with Britain. Other persons employed as agents would maintain regular contact with London. For all other hypothetical resistance movements, similar procedures were worked out that would have been expected from real resistance groups.

To draw attention to the alleged resistance movement in Germany, suitable deceptive measures were devised. Containers with weapons, ammunition, propaganda material, food and the like were to be dropped by aeroplane over supply points of the ostensible resistance movement.

=== January 1945 SIS objections ===
When the plan to carry out the operation took on a more concrete form in January 1945, objections were raised above all by the SIS, which feared that its plans to indoctrinate the enemy could be thwarted by Periwig. An alleged support of hypothetical resistance cells could endanger real anti-Nazi groups in Germany.

== Periwig itself ==
When the concerns of the SIS were dispelled in mid-February 1945, Periwig was able to start. The first step was manipulated radio messages to Germany. From 21 February 1945, the first containers with supplies and forged information material for the alleged resistance cells were dropped by plane. The operation was suspended again from mid-March 1945, as the Supreme Headquarters Allied Expeditionary Force (SHAEF) feared that the Gestapo could misuse such drops of weapons or material near POW camps to commit the murder of Allied prisoners. In early to mid-April 1945, a number of trustworthy German prisoners of war were dropped as alleged agents over German territory. There they were to perform various conspiratorial activities for the claimed resistance cells. The prisoners of war were not aware that these cells did not exist in reality.

=== Propaganda ===
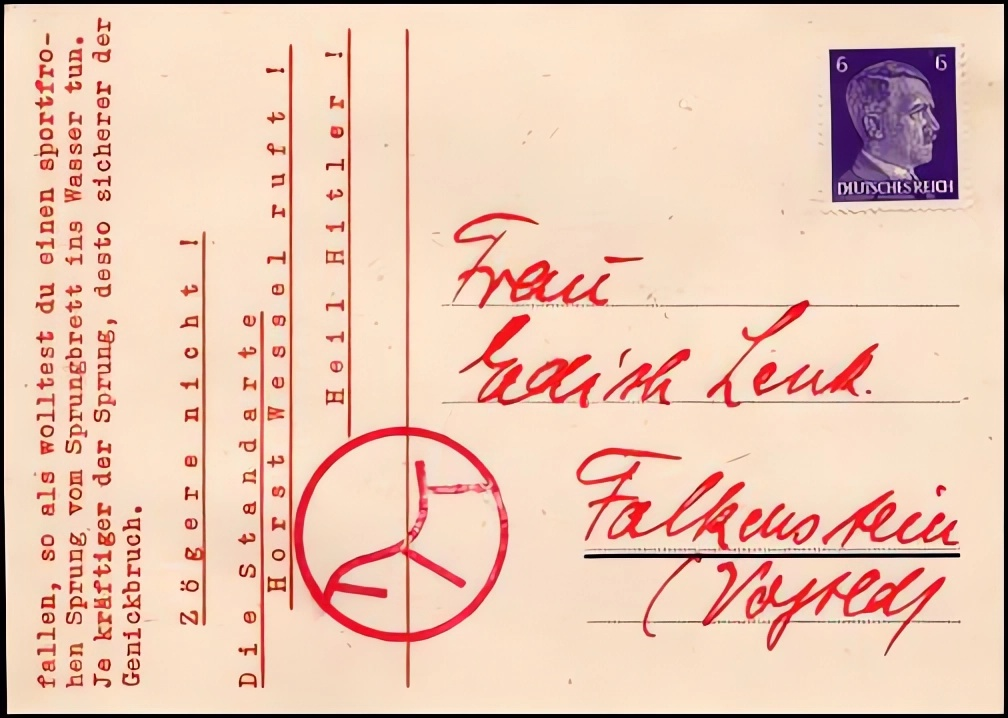
Propaganda postcard sent in the context of Operation Periwig, calling for the suicide of the recipient

To support SOE for Periwig, the PWE took over some tasks related to the printing of propaganda material from March 1945. After a new resistance network called "Red Horse" had been invented for the operation, the PWE also distributed printed material with the horse symbol of the fictitious resistance group. The "goal" of this group was the execution of high-ranking Nazi functionaries. To draw more attention to this goal among the German population, agents were commissioned to place this horse symbol on various buildings or objects while postcards were sent to prominent Germans containing threatening texts, showing the Red Horse symbol. Recipients were asked to commit suicide, with the hidden meaning that this was more honourable than being liquidated by "Red Horse".

On 7 March 1945, an article appeared in the German Wehrmacht magazine Nachrichten für die Truppe (News for the troops) with the headline Sonderbewachung für bedrohten Gauleiter (Special surveillance for threatened Gauleiters). It announced that three additional armoured vehicles and 24 men of the NSKK, under the leadership of Major Ludwig Läubl, would be deployed to protect the 37-year-old Gauleiter of Westphalia South, Albert Hoffmann. It was necessary, it said, as numerous party members have recently been liquidated in the Rhine-Ruhr area. It is believed that Gauleiter Hoffmann was one of the next candidates for an assassination attempt. This description was followed by a list of Nazi members who already had been liquidated and ended with the text that now also the mayor of Bochum, Dr. Piclum, had disappeared without trace. He, too, had received several threatening letters, which only showed the red horse symbol as signature.

=== Use of carrier pigeons ===
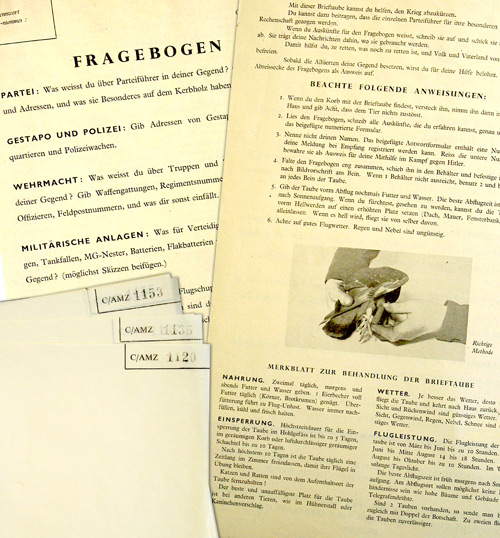
Questionnaire, which was attached in capsules to pigeon legs

The final action of Periwig consisted of the extraordinary plan to use carrier pigeons as spy assistants. From 4 April 1945 pigeons were packed in containers attached to parachutes. These containers were then dropped over enemy territory. A small capsule was fixed to a pigeon leg, which contained a questionnaire, a pencil, and instructions to ensure the safe return of the pigeons to England. The aim was that the pigeons would land in German towns and be found there by cooperative residents who would answer the questions. Afterwards they were to be sent back to England with the information gained, for instance troop strength near the village. Of 330 pigeons used, only nine returned to England and two flew to France. Five pigeons' capsules contained return messages, of which only one was useful.

== Legacy ==
Periwig is considered a failure. Apart from the severe restrictions imposed by the SIS and SHAEF, the actions during the war were also too late. Through earlier planning, a free hand in the actions, and full support from other intelligence institutions, Periwig could possibly have made a significant contribution to the overthrow of the Nazi regime.

== Sources ==
- Fredric Boyce: SOE's ultimate deception: Operation Periwig, Stroud: Sutton, 2005, ISBN 0-7509-4027-1.
