= Spixworth =

Village in Norfolk, England

Coordinates: 52.68951°N 1.32679°E

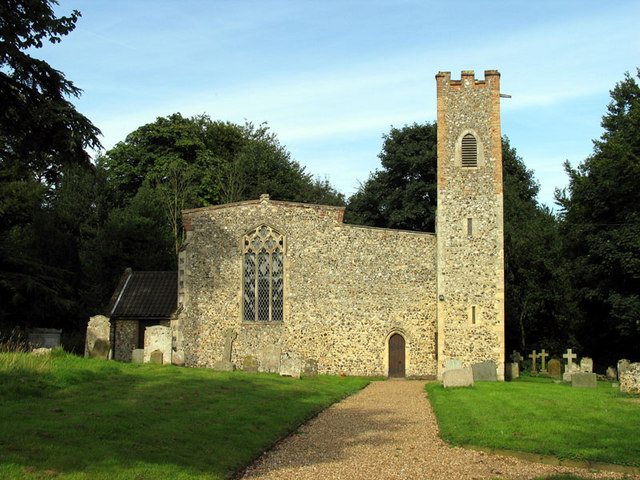
- St Peter, Spixworth

- Location within Norfolk
- Area: 4.80 km^{2} (1.85 sq mi)
- Population: 3,718 (2011)
  - Density: 775/km^{2} (2,010/sq mi)
- OS grid reference: TG249153
  - London: 121 miles (194.7 km)
- Civil parish: Spixworth
- District: Broadland
- Shire county: Norfolk
- Region: East
- Country: England
- Sovereign state: United Kingdom
- Post town: NORWICH
- Postcode district: NR10
- Dialling code: 01603
- Police: Norfolk
- Fire: Norfolk
- Ambulance: East of England
- UK Parliament: Broadland and Fakenham

Spixworth village sign displaying the former Spixworth Hall (demolished 1952) and the crests of the Longe, Frére, Howes and Chittock families

Spixworth is a village and civil parish in the English county of Norfolk. The village lies close to the B1150 road and is 5 miles (8.0 km) north of Norwich and some 10 miles (16.1 km) south of North Walsham. It covers an area of 4.80 km^{2} (1.85 sq mi) and had a population of 3,769 in 1,508 households at the 2001 census including Beeston St Andrew but decreasing to a population of 3,718 in 1,579 households at the 2011 Census. For the purposes of local government, it falls within the district of Broadland.

== Etymology ==
The village was known as Spikeswurda in Norman times and the name is believed to be derived from either the River Spikes (now Spixworth Beck) or Spic meaning swine pasture. The suffix worth is from the Anglo-Saxon yrth meaning land sloping from water or marsh. Alternatively the name is possibly derived from the OE spics (bacon farm) and worth (enclosure).

== History ==
From Saxon times the village has been part of the Taverham Hundred. Prior to the Norman Conquest of 1066 much of the land was held by a Saxon freeman known as Suart. After the conquest, Spixworth and other surrounding villages were given to Roger of Poictiers. In 1199, Peter Bardoph became Lord of the manor, a position the family held to 1485. The estate was eventually sold to William Peck in 1602. Peck, Sheriff of Norwich in 1561 and Mayor of the city in 1573 and 1586, built Spixworth Hall in 1607. The house and estate was subsequently purchased by the Longe family in 1693 and remained in the family until 1950 when the hall was sold. The hall subsequently fell into disrepair and was demolished in 1952. The title, Lord of the manor is still owned by Longe family as well as the surrounding lands.

== The village today ==
Due to its proximity to Norwich the village is a popular residential area. Amenities include an infant school, a junior school, a dental practice, a doctor's surgery, a village hall, a motel, the Longe Arms public house and a wide selection of retail outlets and services.

== The Church of St Peter ==
A church has stood on the same site for 900 years. The present day church dates from 1160 and is built in the Early English style. The narrow pencil shaped tower is the oldest part of the church. Inside the building is a Norman font. Also, of note is the 17th century memorial depicting two life–sized corpses and the church bells some of which date from 1350.

== Public transport ==
=== Bus ===
Scheduled services link the village to Norwich, North Walsham, Attleborough and further afield.

== Sport and leisure ==
The football club Norwich CBS played in the village between 2009 and 2017 under the name Spixworth Football Club.

== Gallery ==
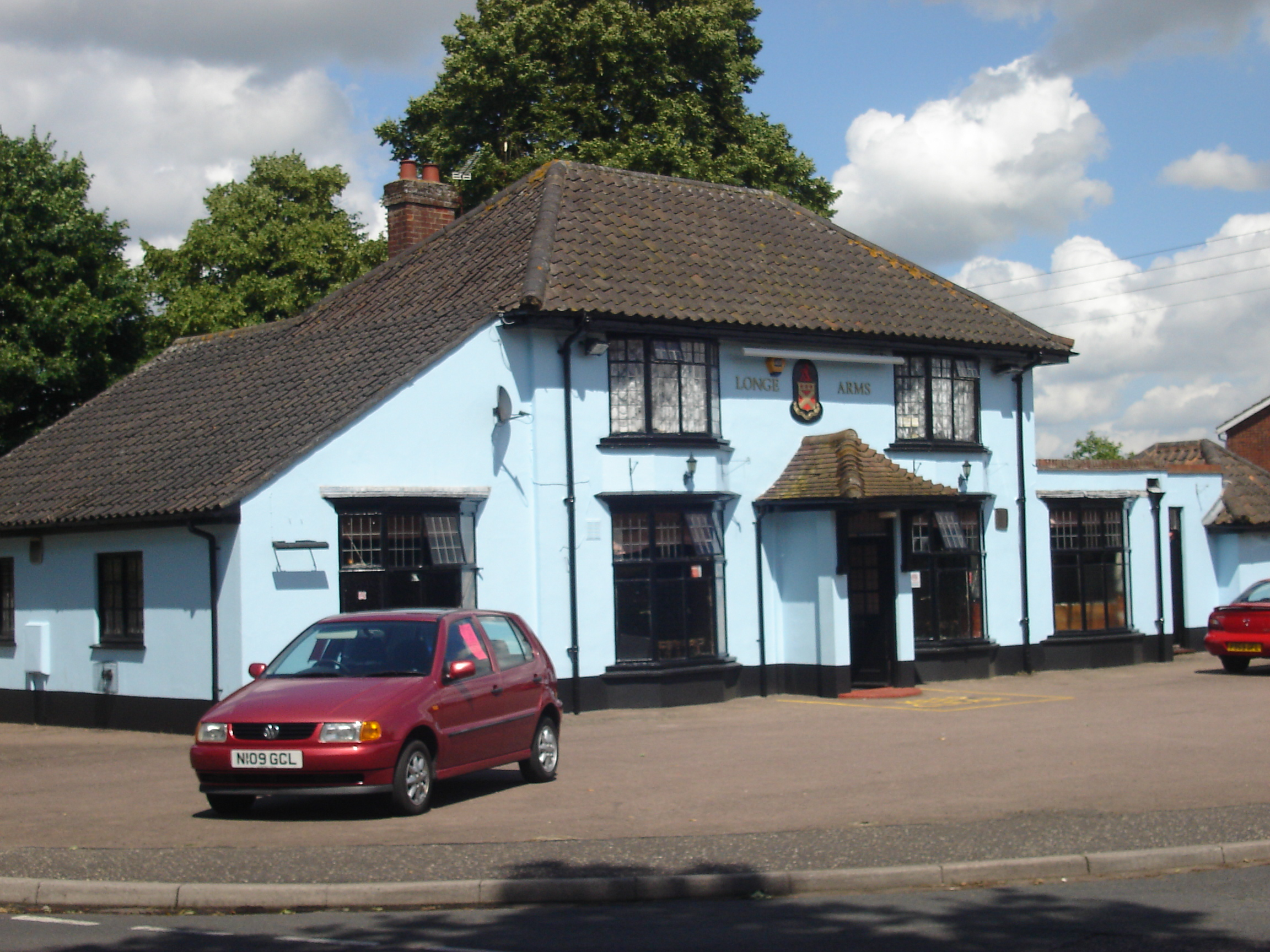
The Longe Arms

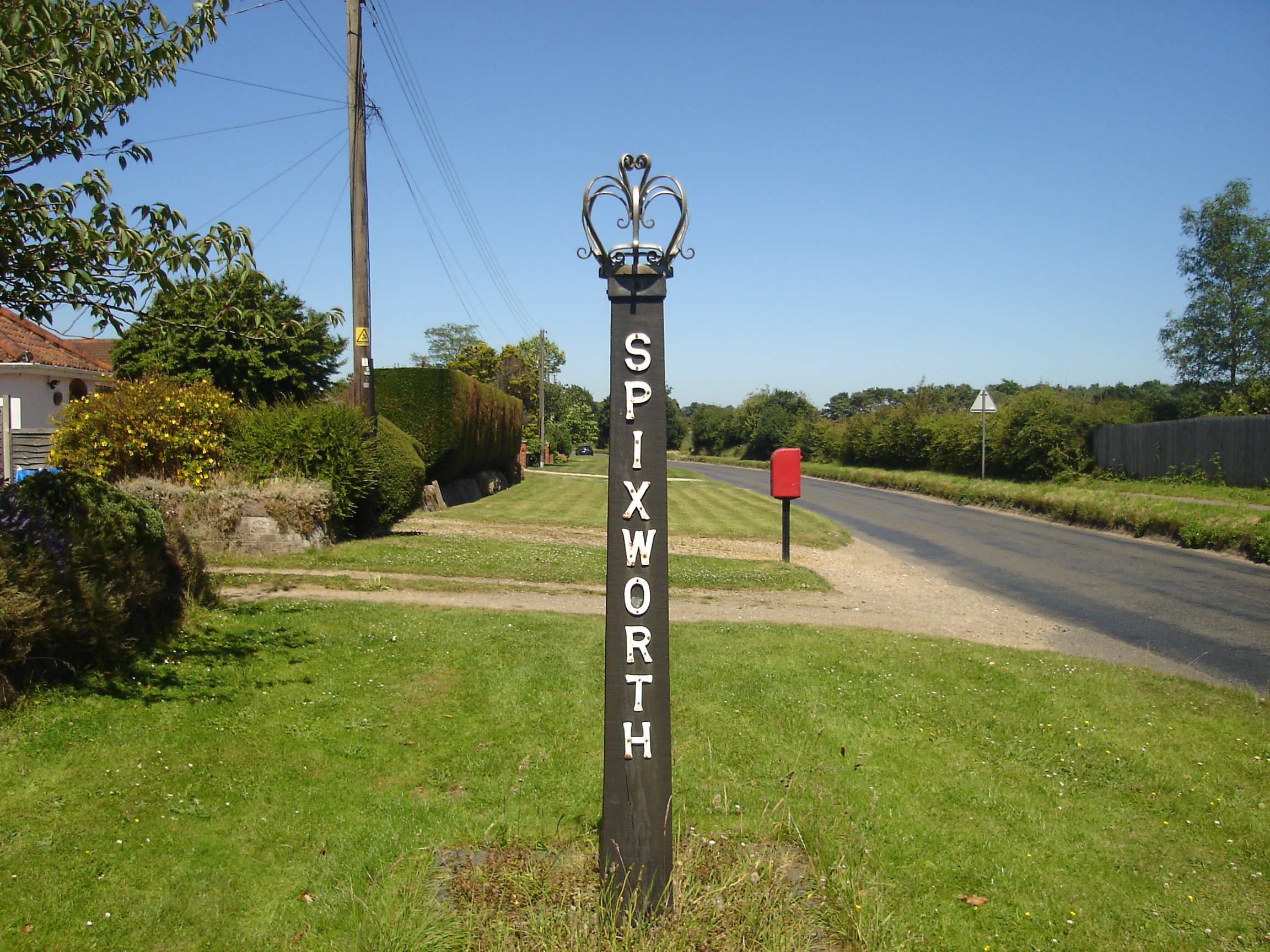
Road sign
