= Lunge (surname) =

Lunge is a surname. Notable people with the surname include:

- Georg Lunge (1839–1923), German chemist
- Jørgen Lunge (1577–1619), Danish nobleman
- Romilly Lunge (1904–1994), British actor
- Vincens Lunge (c. 1486–1536), Danish diplomat
