= Lung, Nepal =

Lung लुङ
- Village Development Committee
- Location in Nepal
- Coordinates: 28.19°N 82.91°E
- Country: Nepal
- Region: Mid-Western
- Zone: Rapti Zone
- District: Pyuthan District
- VDC: Lung

Population (2001 Census)
  - Total: 3,471
- 686 households
- Time zone: UTC+5:45 (Nepal Time)

Lung is a town and Village Development Committee in Pyuthan, a Middle Hills district of Rapti Zone, western Nepal.

== Villages in this VDC ==
		Ward	Lat.	Lon	Elev.
Atighar	आटीघर		28°09'N	82°54'E	895m
Bahane	बाहाने	6	28°12'N	82°54'E	1,105
Chham	छम		28°10'N	82°54'E	945
Chichchaur	चिचचौर		28°11'N	82°54'E	990
Dhand	ढाँड	5	28°11'N	82°54'E	1,250
Dobhai	दोभाई		28°09'N	82°55'E	890
Harela	हरेला		28°12'N	82°55'E	1,310
Jairikanda	जैरीकाँडा		28°11'N	82°55'E	1,825
Khal	खाल		28°11'N	82°55'E	1,750
Khanepani	खानेपानी		28°11'N	82°55'E	1,455
Kimichaur	किमीचौर	7	28°12'N	82°55'E	1,475
Lung	लुङ		28°11'N	82°54'E	1,467
Lunglekh	लुङलेख		28°11'N	82°55'E	1,650
Makre	माक्रे		28°11'N	82°53'E	958
Manabang	मनाबाङ		28°12'N	82°55'E	1,590
Pipaltari	पिपलटारी		28°10'N	82°54'E	950
Purnagaun	पुर्नागाउँ	9	28°10'N	82°54'E	1,299
Simalchaur	सिमलचौर		28°12'N	82°54'E	1,035
Sirbari	सिरबारी	3	28°11'N	82°53'E	950
Sirseni	सिरसेनी		28°11'N	82°54'E	1,030
Siurikote	सिउरीकोटे		28°12'N	82°54'E	1,450
Tham	थाम		28°11'N	82°54'E	1,205
