= Chapois, Jura =

Commune in Bourgogne-Franche-Comté, France

Chapois
- Commune
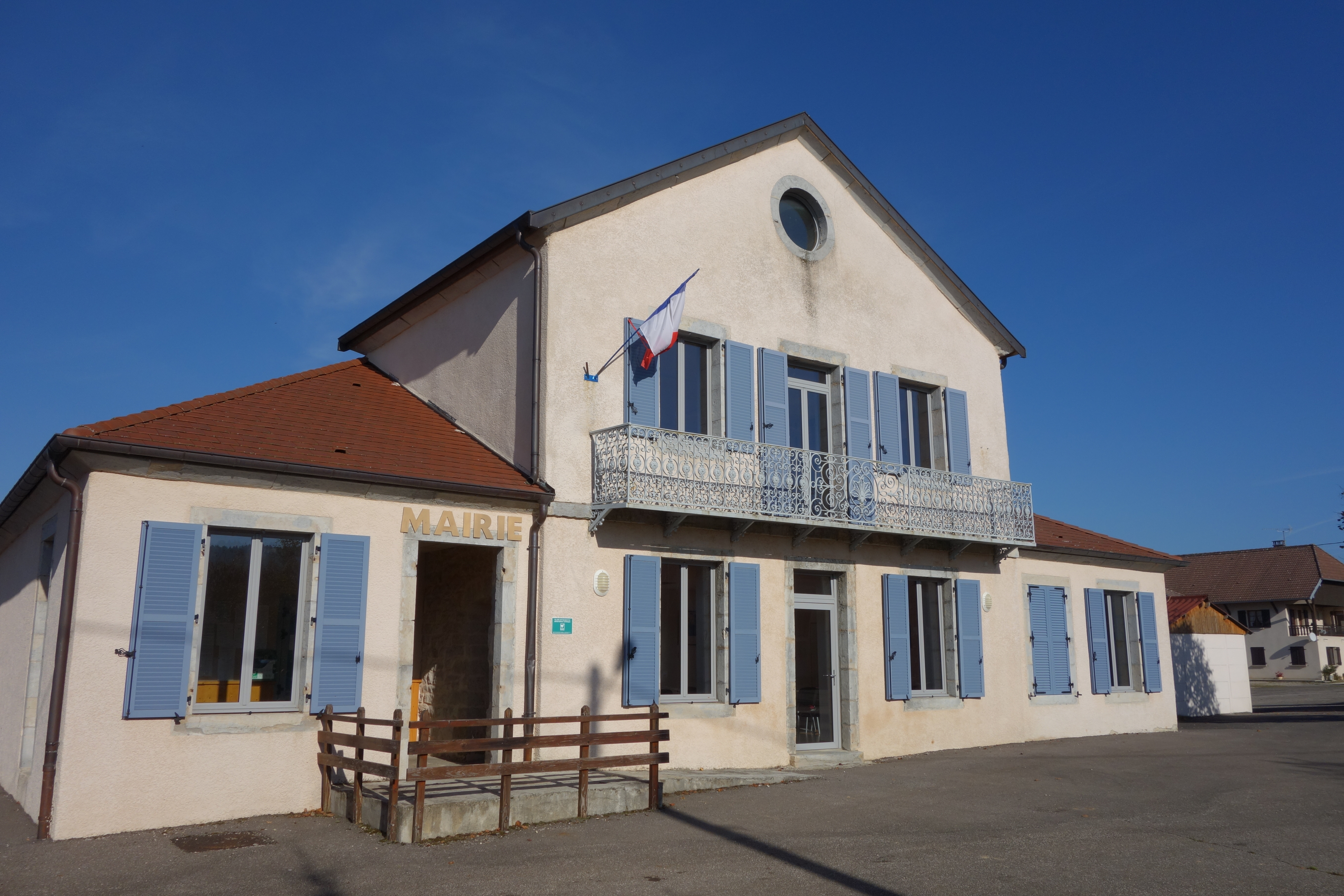
- The town hall in Chapois
- Location of Chapois
- Location within France Location within Bourgogne-Franche-Comté
- Coordinates: 46°50′15″N 5°57′42″E
- Country: France
- Region: Bourgogne-Franche-Comté
- Department: Jura
- Arrondissement: Lons-le-Saunier
- Canton: Champagnole

Government
  - Mayor (2020–2026): Jean Noël Tribut
- Area^{1}: 10.07 km^{2} (3.89 sq mi)
- Highest elevation: 832 m (2,730 ft)
- Lowest elevation: 597 m (1,959 ft)
- Population (2023): 219
  - Density: 21.7/km^{2} (56.3/sq mi)
- Time zone: UTC+01:00 (CET)
  - Summer (DST): UTC+02:00 (CEST)
- INSEE/Postal code: 39105 /39300
- ^{1} French Land Register data, which excludes lakes, ponds, glaciers > 1 km^{2} (0.386 sq mi or 247 acres) and river estuaries.

Chapois (French pronunciation: [ʃapwa]) is a commune in the Jura department in Bourgogne-Franche-Comté in eastern France.

== Population ==
Historical population
Year	Pop.	±% p.a.
1968	210	—
1975	176	−2.49%
1982	217	+3.04%
1990	207	−0.59%
1999	206	−0.05%
2007	203	−0.18%
2012	202	−0.10%
2017	224	+2.09%
2023	219	−0.38%
Source: INSEE

== See also ==
- Communes of the Jura department
