= Gervase Cowell =

British diplomat and intelligence officer (1926–2000)

- Born: 4 August 1926; Sale, Cheshire
- Died: 2 May 2000 (aged 73); Sutton, London
- Education: St Bede's College, Manchester; St Catharine's College, Cambridge
- Occupations: Intelligence agent, diplomat and Historian
- Spouse: Pamela Alger
- Children: Two sons and a daughter

Gervase Cowell MBE (4 August 1926 – 2 May 2000) was half of a British husband-and-wife intelligence team who handled Colonel Oleg Penkovsky, a Soviet GRU military intelligence officer who provided the West with invaluable military secrets.

Gervase and Pamela Cowell replaced another couple, Charles and Janet Chisholm, after Janet became pregnant and was recalled to London in June 1962. After Penkovsky was arrested on 22 October 1962, tried and later executed, the Cowells were expelled from the Soviet Union.

After retirement he became chairman of the historical sub-committee of the Special Forces Club, for which work he was made an MBE in the new year's honours list.

== Bibliography ==
Cowell, G., Special Forces Club., & Great Britain. (1993). Ravensbrück: The women of S.O.E.F Section. London: Special Forces Club.
