= Francis Davy Longe =

English cricketer and lawyer (1831–1910)

- Born: 25 September 1831; Coddenham, Suffolk, England
- Died: 20 February 1910 (aged 78)
- Occupations: First-class cricketer Lawyer; Economist; Inspector

Francis Davy Longe (25 September 1831 – 20 February 1910) was an English first-class cricketer, lawyer, anti-classical economist and inspector for the Local Government Board.

== Early life and family ==
Longe was born on 25 September 1831 at Coddenham Vicarage in Suffolk, the second son of the Rev. R. Longe. Longe was educated at Harrow School where he boarded at The Head Master’s. Longe later attended Oriel College, Oxford where he graduated with a BA in 1854. Longe was a student at Inner Temple and was called to the bar on 30 April 1858, serving on the eastern circuit. Longe was a descendant of Pocahontas.

== Cricket ==
At Harrow and Oxford, Longe excelled at cricket, eventually becoming the captain of Harrow School Cricket XI team, playing at the famous Eton v Harrow match held annually at Lord's Cricket Ground between 1847 and 1850. At Oxford, Longe played first-class cricket for Oxford University team between 1850 and 1851 and Marylebone Cricket Club.

== Career ==
Longe became private secretary to Lord Goschen, who gave him the role of a general inspector of the Local Government Board, which Longe undertook for almost 30 years.

He served on a British commission on child labour from 1862 to 1867. In economics, he is best known for his anti-classical 1866 tract, making him one of the first persons to demolish the Ricardian Wages-Fund doctrine. In this, Longe was followed up independently by W. T. Thornton.

He retired to Lowestoft, was an active member of the Norfolk and Norwich Naturalists' Society, and served as president of the Ipswich Scientific Society. He was a Fellow of the Geological Society.

He died on 20 February 1910.

== Works ==
Longe wrote a number of books including:

- An Inquiry into the Law of 'Strikes', 1860.
- A Refutation of the Wage-Fund Theory of Modern Political Economy as enunciated by Mr. Mill, MP and Mr. Fawcett, M.P., 1866.
- A Critical Examination of Mr. George's Progress & Poverty and Mr. Mill's Theory of Wages, 1883.
- Lowestoft in Olden Times, 1899.
- The Fiction Of The Ice Age Or Glacial Period, 1902.

== See also ==
- List of Oxford University Cricket Club players
