= Operation Noah's Ark (1944) =

1944 plan to harass the German army exiting Greece

Operation Noah's Ark was a World War II plan instigated by the British Special Operations Executive (SOE) to harass German troops as they withdrew from Greece. It was to encompass a series of operations, including Operation Underdone in Albania, to be executed by local partisan groups. In practice, it was not executed, due to lack of effective groups.

== Sources ==
- Bailey, Roderick (2008). The Wildest Province. London: Jonathan Cape. ISBN 9780224079167.
