= Ciney =

City in Wallonia, Belgium

Ciney: Cînè (Walloon)
- City and municipality
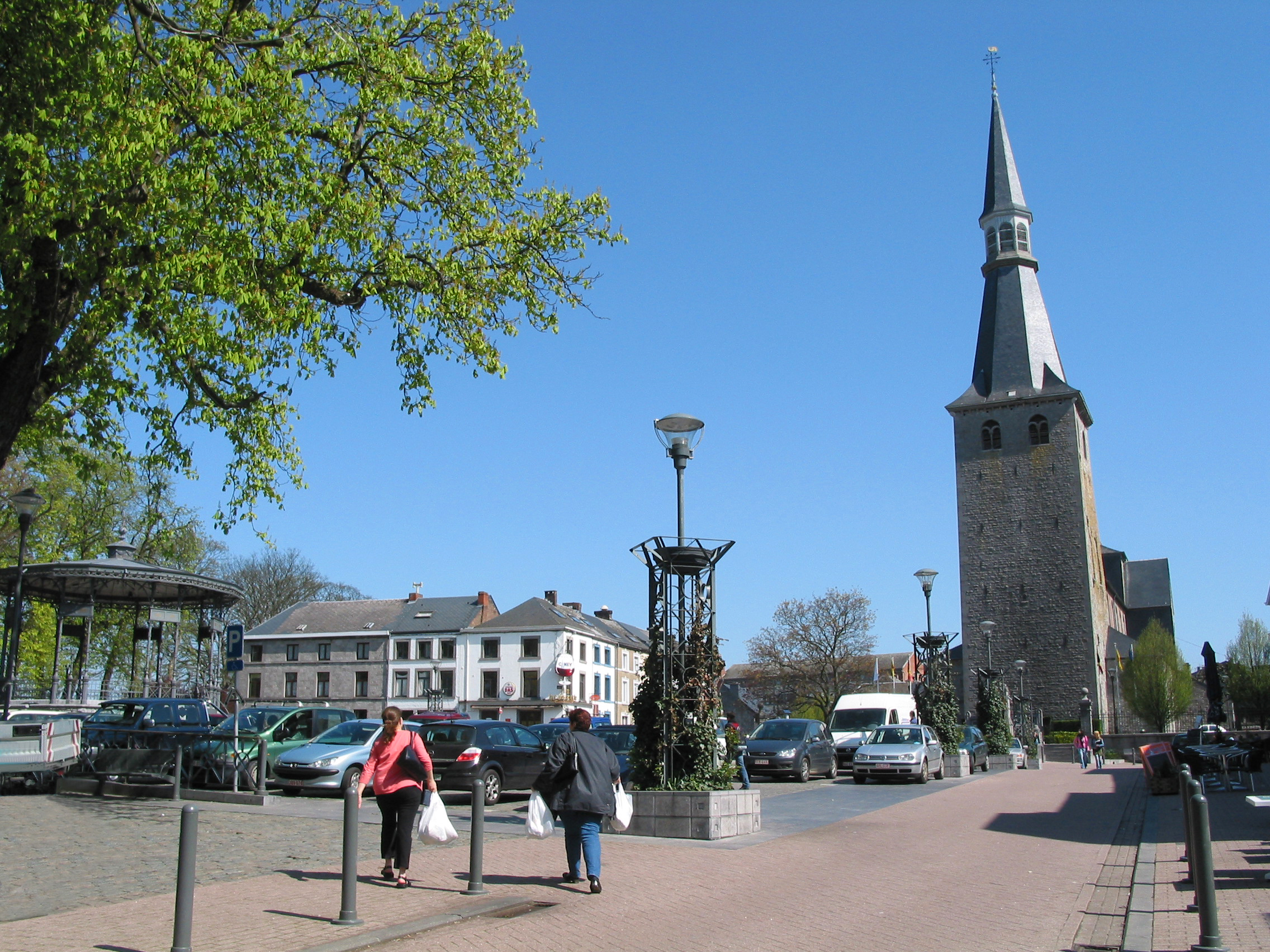
- Place Monseu

- Flag Coat of arms

- Location of Ciney in Namur province
- Interactive map of Ciney
- Location in Belgium
- Coordinates: 50°18′N 05°06′E
- Country: Belgium
- Community: French Community
- Region: Wallonia
- Province: Namur Province
- Arrondissement: Dinant

Government
  - Mayor: Frédéric Deville
  - Governing party: Intérêts Cinaciens (ICI)

Area
  - Total: 147.87 km^{2} (57.09 sq mi)

Population (2018-01-01)
  - Total: 16,439
  - Density: 111.17/km^{2} (287.93/sq mi)
- Postal codes: 5590
- NIS code: 91030
- Area codes: 083
- Website: www.ciney.be

Ciney (French pronunciation: [sinɛ]; Walloon: Cînè) is a municipality and city of Wallonia located in the province of Namur, Belgium. As of 2018, Ciney had a total population of 16,439. The total area is 147.56 km^{2} which gives a population density of 111 inhabitants per km^{2}.

== Administrative divisions ==
The municipality consists of the following districts: Achêne, Braibant, Chevetogne, Ciney, Conneux, Leignon, Pessoux, Serinchamps, and Sovet, along with a number of villages, including Chapois.

== Economy ==
Several beers from the city are now brewed by Alken-Maes and still bear the name: Ciney Blonde, Ciney Brown, and Ciney Special. Those beers were first brewed in 1978.

== History ==
Ciney was also previously known as Chiney in English. The city was damaged by a heavy storm on 14 July 2010. The bell tower, the city's symbol and also Ciney's beer symbol, collapsed on its nave. No injuries were reported. Reconstruction took more than a year and cost some million euros.

== Demography ==
Ciney's population (1990–2011).

== Education ==
Ciney has two Catholic secondary schools and two state secondary schools. The Technobel Competence center, an information technology and communications training centre, is located in Ciney.

== Healthcare ==
Ciney hosts the Sainte-Marie Medical Center of the CHU UCLouvain Namur university hospital.

== Notable people ==
- Erwin Drèze, comic book artist
- Patrick Dupriez, politician
- Catherine Fonck, nephrologist and politician
- Philippe Mahoux, politician

== See also ==
- Chapois
- Leignon
- List of protected heritage sites in Ciney
- Skanifest, a music festival
