= Smart Lethieullier =

English antiquary

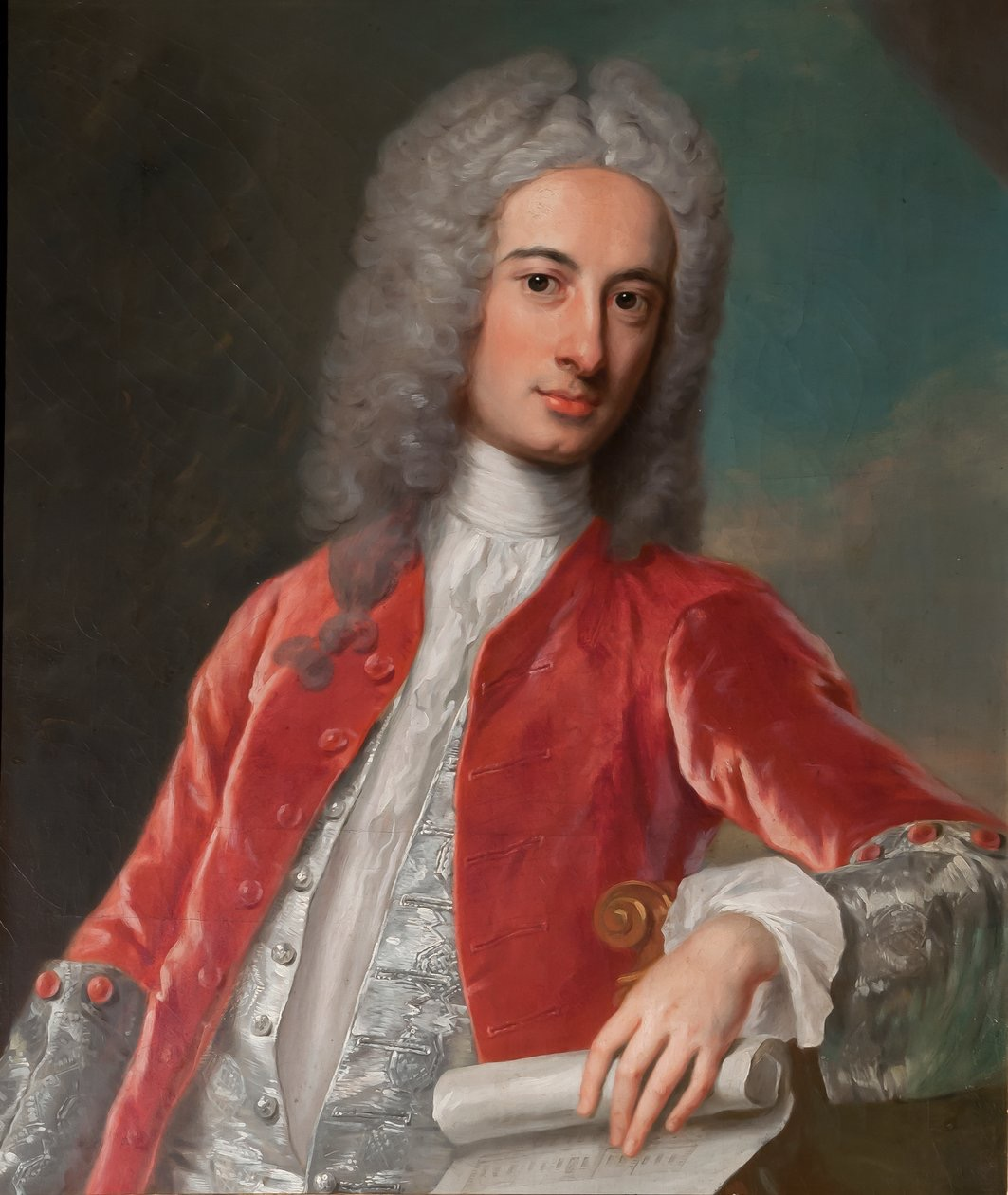
Smart Lethieullier by George Knapton

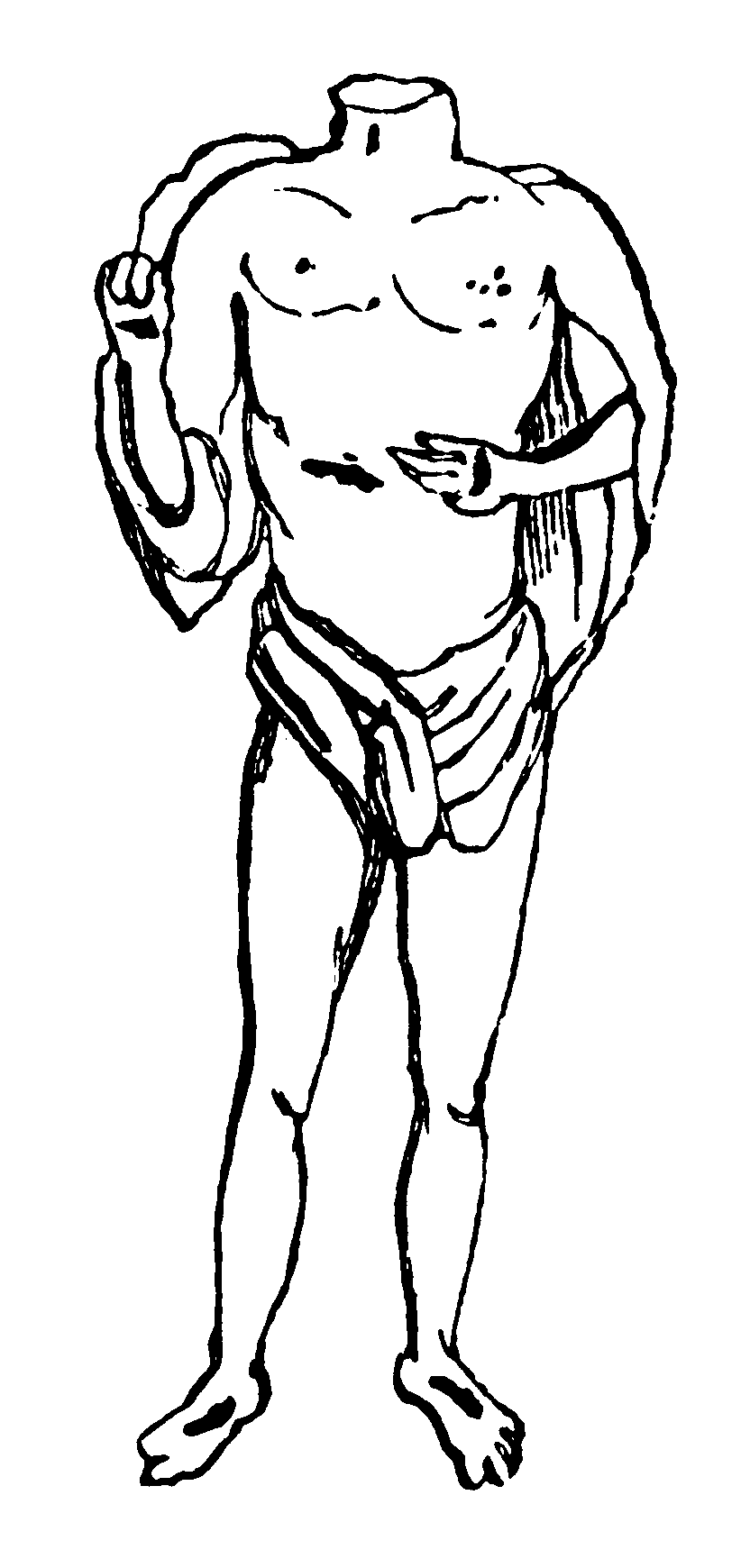
Drawing of the headless statue of 'Little St Hugh', in Lincoln Cathedral, by Smart Lethieullier

Smart Lethieullier (3 November 1701 – 27 August 1760) was an English antiquary.

== Early life and education ==
Lethieullier was born on 3 November 1701 at Aldersbrook Manor House, Little Ilford, Essex. His family was of Spanish Netherlands Huguenot origin, and had come to London as refugees in 1605. His grandfather, Sir John Lethieullier (1632/3–1719), had succeeded in trade, and had risen to become Sheriff of London in 1674–5, and owner of the Aldersbrook estate (purchased 1693). Sir John's son, also named John (d. 1737), married Elizabeth Smart, and Smart was their second son. He was educated at Eton College and Trinity College, Oxford, from where he graduated MA in 1723.

== Antiquarian interests ==
Lethieullier subsequently travelled in France, Italy, Germany, and throughout Britain, and developed a passion for the study and collection of antiquities and fossils. He was elected a fellow of the Royal Society (1724), the Society of Antiquaries (1725), and a member of the Spalding Gentlemen's Society (1733). He developed a wide network of antiquarian and scientific friends and contacts, including Francesco Ficoroni, Bernard de Montfaucon, Richard Pococke, Andrew Ducarel, Francis Wise, Martin Folkes, Samuel Gale, Richard Mead and Peter Collinson.

He wrote numerous letters and papers on antiquarian topics. None were published in his lifetime, but a number appeared posthumously in Archaeologia (journal of the Society of Antiquaries) and elsewhere. His subjects included Roman remains (including those in the grounds of Wanstead House and neighbouring Aldersbrook Manor), the Ambresbury Banks hillfort, the shrine of St Hugh in Lincoln Cathedral, and techniques for the dating of English church monuments. In 1732–33, when he was living in Paris, he wrote the first detailed account in English of the Bayeux Tapestry: it was eventually published in 1767 as an appendix to Andrew Ducarel's Anglo-Norman Antiquities.

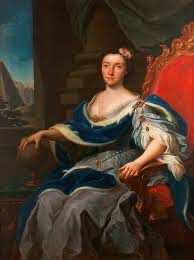
Portrait of Mrs. Smart Lethieullier by Andrea Casali

In 1737, on his father's death, Lethieullier inherited Aldersbrook and began to improve the grounds, including the building of a hermitage in which to house his collections.

== Public service ==
Lethieullier served as High Sheriff of Essex in 1758.

== Personal life ==
Lethieullier married Margaret Sloper in February 1726. She died in 1753: there were no children of the marriage. His estates were inherited by his niece Mary, daughter of his younger brother Charles.

St Mary the Virgin Church

== Last resting place ==
Lethieullier died on 27 August 1760 at Aldersbrook, and was buried in St Mary's Church, Little Ilford.

== Sources ==
- Chown, C. H. I. (1926). "The Lethieullier Family of Aldersbrook House". Essex Review. 35: 203–20.
- Collinson, P. (1760). "Smart Lethieulier, Esq [Obituary]". Gentleman's Magazine. 1st series. 30: 443.
- Ellis, L. B. (April 1953). "The Lethieullier Family". Proceedings of the Huguenot Society. 19 (2): 60–67.
- Treasure, Geoffrey (2004). "Lethieullier, Smart (1701–1760)". Oxford Dictionary of National Biography (online ed.). Oxford University Press. doi:10.1093/ref:odnb/16522. (Subscription, Wikipedia Library access or UK public library membership required.)
