= Wanstead Roman Villa =

Coordinates: 51.567°N 0.040°E

Archaeological findings from Wanstead Roman Villa in Redbridge Museum

Wanstead Roman Villa was a Roman villa on an unknown site in what is now Wanstead Park. Archaeological excavations carried out in 1985 indicated a Roman presence here from the 1st to the 5th century AD, but did not locate any specific site of a Roman villa.

A mosaic discovered in 1715 by gardener Adam Holt was described as:

"... from north to south ... 20 feet, and from east to west about 16; that it was composed of small square brick tesserae of different sizes and colours, as black, white, red, &c., of all which I have specimens; that there was a border about a foot broad went, round it, Composed of red dice, about ¾ of an inch square, within which were severall ornaments, and in the middle the figure of a man riding upon some beast and holding something in his hands; but, as he opened it onely in a hurry, and in different places, he was able to give no bettor account of it."

— Smart Lethieullier, Aldersbrook, July 12, 1735

According to Lethieullier, owner of the adjacent Aldersbrook Manor, the pavement "was situated on a gentle gravely ascent towards the north, and at a small distance from the south end of it I remember a well of exceeding fine water, now absorbed in a great pond". Lethieullier's first letter mentions "foundations", which he believed to be Roman, at some distance to the south of the pavement, and on the very edge of the Wanstead estate "about 300 yards due south from the said well and pavement, there were, in my memory, the ruins of foundations to be seen, though now destroyed by planting trees round the park pales". A second letter also mentions the "foundation of a Roman building", "at a small distance" from the site of the pavement. Lethieullier goes on to state that in the summer of 1746 workmen showed him "urns" "of the coarsest earth" and bones they had discovered, which he believed to be the remains of Roman burials, as well as at least three coins.

The exact locations of the Roman remains described by Smart Lethieullier were subsequently lost although Jack Elsden Tuffs undertook further archaeological work during the 1960s. A limited ground-penetrating radar survey was undertaken in February 2007 running north–south to a point just north of the refreshment hut and showed anomalies consistent with the buried foundations of a large masonry building running diagonally across the survey area. What appeared to be at least two rooms were visible which are considered likely to date from the Roman period.

== Historical context of the Roman antiquities at Wanstead ==
The local British tribes of (what became) Essex before the Claudian Roman invasion of 43 CE were the Trinobantes and the Catuvellauni; the Catuvellauni were the largest tribe in Britain and the more dominant in the area of Wanstead at the time of the Claudian invasion, with their capital at Colchester.

In early June 43 CE, a Roman force of 45,000 (four 5,000-man Legions and 25,000 auxiliaries) led in part by the future Emperor Vespasian had met an army of 150,000 Britons, under the Catuvellauni kings Caratacus and his brother Togodumnus, on the River Medway, Kent, as recorded by Cassius Dio. The Britons were defeated in a two-day battle, and then again shortly afterwards on the ThamesThames. Togodumnus was killed and Caratacus withdrew to continue resistance elsewhere in Britain.

Having crossed the Thames, the Romans established a fort at Camulodunum (Colchester) which became connected to Londinium (London) by the Roman road running south of Wanstead, immediately south passing through Forest Gate, on through Ilford and Romford (Roman Durolitum at Gallows Corner), to Chelmsford and Colchester - Roman Road 3 (RR3).

Suetonius, writing around 120 CE, recorded a prominent role played by one commander, Titus Flavius Vespasianus (later the emperor Vespasian), with Legio II Augusta. As one of the four conquering legions, Vespasian's troops may have constructed all or part of the Roman road to Camulodunum.

== Roman roads through east London and Essex ==
A series of roads developed out from Londinium between the years 43 and 68, with RR3 leaving the eastern corner of the capital through the Roman gate at Aldgate (known as the Old Gate to the later Saxons), then following the line of what is now Whitechapel Road through to Camulodunum (Colchester) and Venta Icenorum (Norwich), being recorded by the Romans as both Iter V and Iter IX in the Antonine Itinerary.

Further Roman road construction was undertaken by the Roman legions, and a Roman road was constructed from Old Ford (at Bow-Stratford) through Wanstead and on to Chigwell (Roman name unknown), also built by Roman legionaries. The road connected London to Great Dunmow and at its northernmost point forms a connection between two Roman roads (RR30 & RR32), with RR32 running west from Camulodunum to Braughing (Roman name unknown - near Ware, Hertfordshire) and facilitating access to central southern Britain from Camulodonum to support military activity and later trade.

== Evidence for a Roman road at Wanstead ==
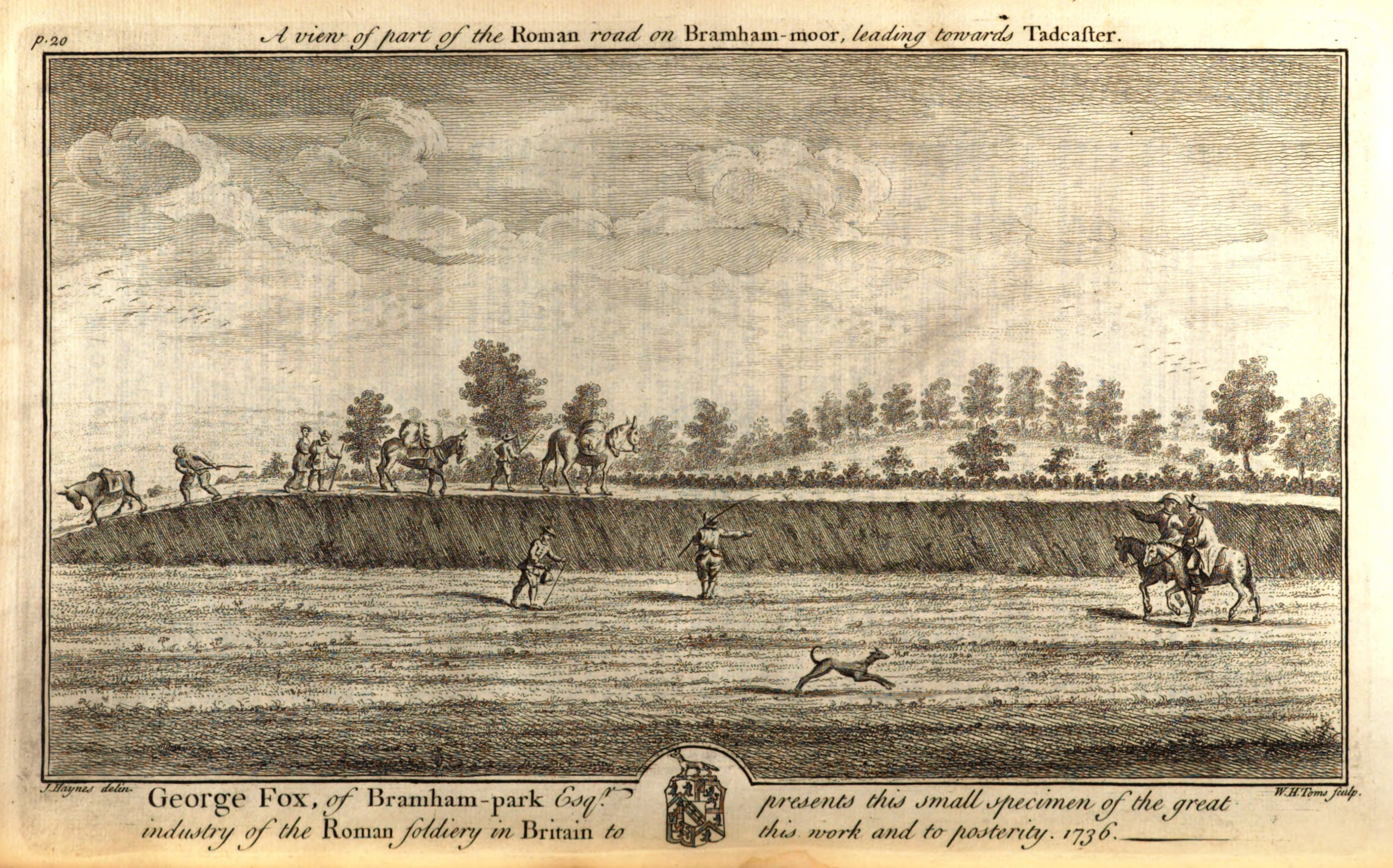
Agger at Bramham Park 1736

An ancient Roman agger—evidence of the course of a Roman road—can be seen in the woods at the junction of Blake Hall Road and Bush Road adjacent to the estate boundary of Wanstead House (marked by the gates to the estate which still stand at this busy traffic junction). This agger aligns with RR30 and may present evidence of a Roman road running from the ancient Roman crossing at Old Ford to Great Dunmow, passing along this ancient Roman agger at Wanstead on its route, having its exit from Londinium at Aldgate.

== Sources ==
- Wanstead House and the Parklands - a History, www.wansteadwildlife.org.uk. (June 2010). This article has drawn heavily from this source.
- Cornish, Alan. M.Sc. Wanstead Park - A Chronicle. (Originally published by the Friends of Wanstead Parklands in 1982, updated and republished by Wanstead Parklands Community Project in 2006.)
