= Vanden Plas (disambiguation) =

Vanden Plas is the name of a former coachbuilders, later used as a car badge by BMC and most recently, Jaguar.

Vanden Plas may also refer to:

- Vanden Plas (band), a German progressive metal band
- Camille Van den Plas (1850–1902), Belgian soldier, accountant and colonial administrator.
- Louise van den Plas (1877–1968), Belgian suffragist and founder of the first Christian feminist movement in Belgium

== See also ==
- Vanden, a prefix in Dutch language surnames
- Plas (disambiguation)
- Van der Plas
