= Wanstead Sewage Works =

English municipal sewage treatment works

Wanstead Sewage Works, also known as Redbridge (Southern) Sewage Works or Empress Sewage Works, was a municipal sewage treatment works located on a site bounded by the River Roding to the east and Wanstead Park to the north, in the south eastern corner of the parish of Wanstead, in the London Borough of Redbridge, historically within the county of Essex, England. It was in operation from 1 March 1884 to December 1977.

== Establishment ==
Before the nineteenth century, water supplies in Wanstead were from wells and pumps, but in 1857 The East London Waterworks Company extended its water main to Wanstead, though the supply was far from adequate in the early years. Increasing pollution and awareness of its supposed connection with disease, notably typhoid fever and diphtheria, led to public pressure for the establishment of sewage treatment facilities.

Two hundred acres of the land belonging to Aldersbrook Manor and farm had already been sold in 1853 to become the City of London Cemetery, and the local board bought an area to the north of this for the establishment of Wanstead Sewage Works. Access to the sewage works site was from the west, via a road that became Empress Avenue in the early twentieth century when houses were built. The original works were shown on an 1894 Ordnance Survey map as a "sewage farm".

== The treatment process ==
The original sewage treatment process, described in some detail in October 1884 (a few months after the works opened), was as follows. Incoming sewage was screened and then held in settlement tanks. From here the liquid was passed onto the surface of land which had been specially prepared with under-drainage at an average depth of eight feet. The sewage gradually percolated through the soil into the under drains, and from these the purified liquid, described as "clear and bright", was released into the River Roding. The sludge from the tanks was run into a sludge bed, and periodically this was dug out and ploughed as manure into land more than a quarter of a mile from the river, in order to minimise the risk of it causing river pollution.

== Closure and subsequent changes ==
The works operated until December 1977, after which it became derelict, controlled by the Thames Water Authority, and then the site passed to the Department of Transport in the 1980s for use as "exchange" land for road building and improvement which would affect Epping Forest. In July 1993, they offered two areas totalling about twenty acres to Epping Forest and some landscaping work was undertaken; eleven acres of this was in exchange for forest land used for the M11 link road. In 2007, a borehole was drilled in the remaining portion of the site to extract water from an aquifer about 80 metres underground. Cycle paths and horse riding have also been facilitated through the area.
