= St Michael's Church, Romford Road =

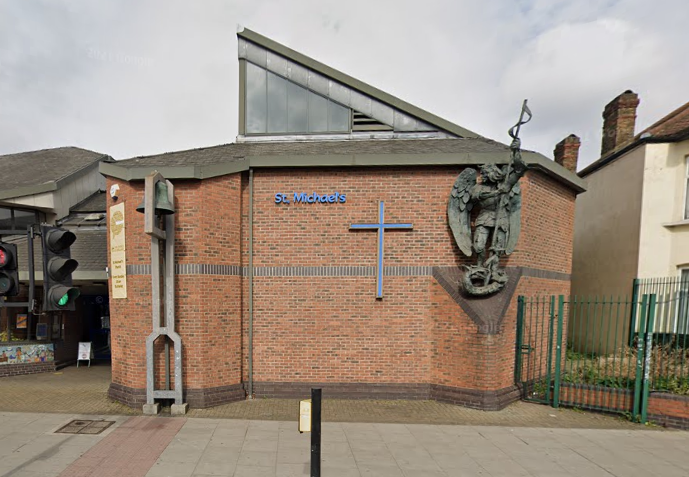
- St Michael's Church, Romford Road
- 51°33′13.778″N 0°3′21.577″E
- Location: Manor Park, Newham, London
- Country: England
- Denomination: Church of England
- Website: St Michael and All Angels

Administration
- Archdiocese: Canterbury
- Diocese: Chelmsford
- Archdeaconry: West Ham
- Deanery: Newham

St Michael's Church is a Church of England parish church on the Romford Road in Manor Park, east London.

It originated in an 1894 mission hall opened on the Romford Road by St Mary's Church, Little Ilford. Initially housed in an iron church, St Michael's moved into a red-brick permanent church by Charles Spooner whose nave and aisles were completed in 1898 and its chancel in 1906. St Michael's became a separate mission district in 1928 under a priest-in-charge, answerable to a bishop, before taking over as the area's parish church in 1939, with St Mary's as its chapel of ease.

This Victorian building was later closed, demolished and replaced by a smaller church on the same site as part of the Froud Centre. It serves the parish of St Michael & All Angels, joint with St Mary the Virgin, Little Ilford. As of 2021, the parish priest is Father Lee Taylor.
