= Alders Brook =

River in England

Coordinates: 51°33′25″N 0°03′56″E

The Alders Brook is a small tributary of the River Roding. The name derives from Middle English meaning "brook where alders grow" and is first recorded in 1535; previously it was the site of a farmstead known as Nakethalle or Nagethalle, literally "naked hall", alluding not to a building but to an exposed or unoccupied enclosure. It now marks part of the boundary between the London Boroughs of Newham and Redbridge, with the west bank in the parish of Little Ilford and the east bank in that of Great Ilford. It gave its name to the Aldersbrook area, the Manor of Aldersbrook and the Aldersbrook Estate.
