= St Nicholas' Chapel, Manor Park =

Roman Catholic church in Manor Park, East London, England

Coordinates: 51.5541°N 0.0447°E

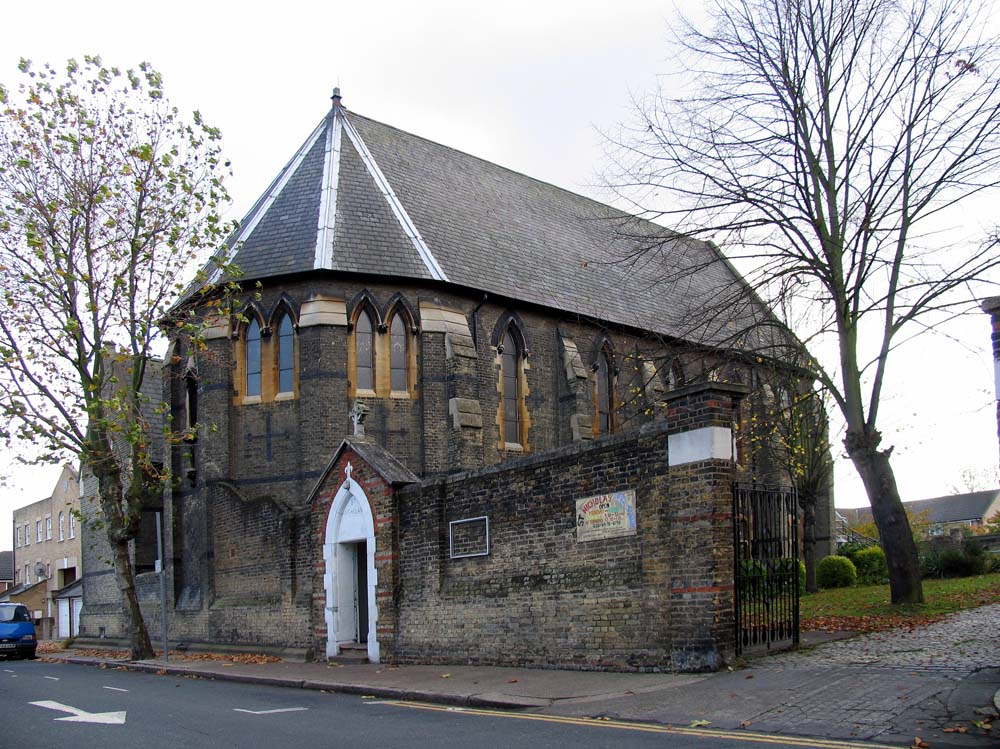
St Nicholas' Chapel

St Nicholas' Chapel, Manor Park is a Roman Catholic church in Manor Park, East London.

== History ==
It originated in 1870 as a chapel for St Nicholas's Catholic Industrial School for Boys, which occupied Manor House, previously home to the Quaker Fry family, best known for Elizabeth Fry. In 1918 St Nicholas became a parish church in its own right as well as a school chapel, when a new Manor Park parish was created. In 1924 it gained a chapel of its own, St Stephen's in Little Ilford - their status as parish church and chapel were reversed in 1934, with St Stephen's taking over as the parish church and the parish becoming known as that of St Stephen and St Nicholas. In 1925 the school closed, after which its site and buildings (other than the chapel and priests' house) were sold to the London Co-operative Society.
