= Wanstead =

Area of East London

Coordinates: 51.577792°N 0.028589°E

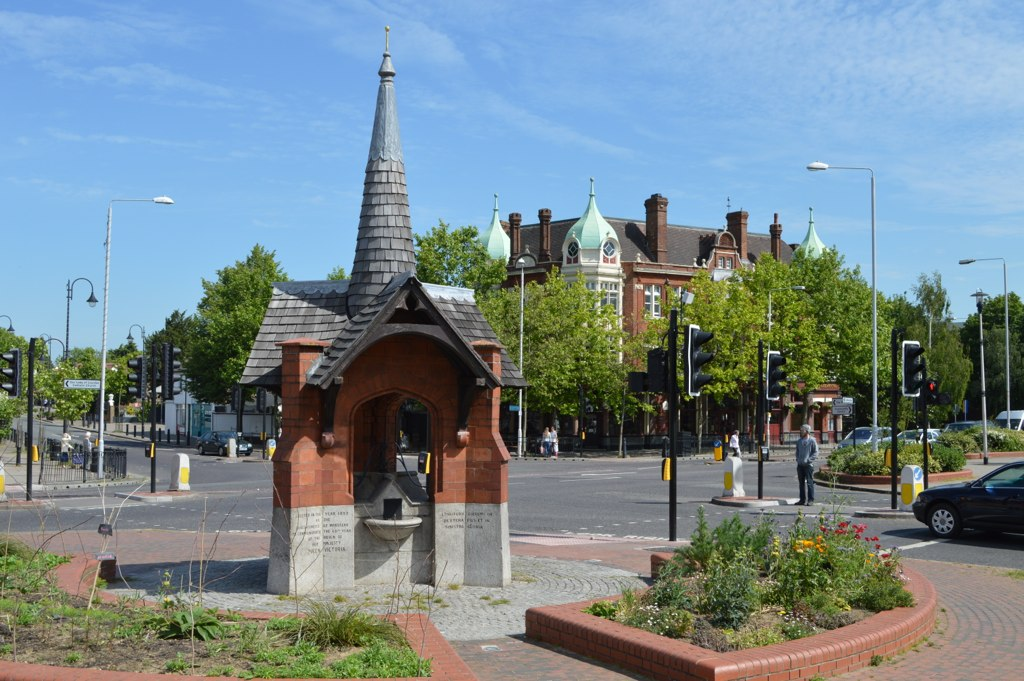
- Wanstead drinking fountain, built to celebrate Queen Victoria's diamond jubilee

- Location within Greater London
- Population: 11,543 (2011 Census. Ward)
- OS grid reference: TQ405885
- London borough: Redbridge
- Ceremonial county: Greater London
- Region: London
- Country: England
- Sovereign state: United Kingdom
- Post town: LONDON
- Postcode district: E11
- Dialling code: 020
- Police: Metropolitan
- Fire: London
- Ambulance: London
- UK Parliament: Leyton & Wanstead
- London Assembly: Havering and Redbridge

Wanstead (/ˈwɒnstɛd/) is an area in east London, England, in the London Borough of Redbridge. It borders South Woodford to the north, Redbridge to the east and Manor Park to the south, with Leytonstone and Walthamstow to the west. It is located 8 miles northeast of Charing Cross.

Historically an ancient parish in the Becontree hundred of Essex, it was granted urban district status in 1894, and formed part of the Municipal Borough of Wanstead and Woodford between 1937 and 1965, when it became part of the London Borough of Redbridge. Wanstead was a key part of the M11 link road protest from 1993 to 1995, which ended with the construction of the A12 that runs through the town.

The area contains a number of open spaces that are part of Epping Forest, including the grasslands of Wanstead Flats and the woodland of Wanstead Park. Wanstead Park was the site of a suspected Roman villa, and later Wanstead Hall, the manor house of Wanstead Manor. The park, with artificial lakes, was formerly part of the estate of a large stately home Wanstead House (1722–1825), built by Richard Child, 1st Earl Tylney.

== History ==
=== Toponymy ===
The place name is probably of Saxon origin and is first recorded in a charter of 1065 as Wenstede. The English Place-Names Society derives the name from the Anglo-Saxon words waenn, meaning a hill or mound, and stede, a place or settlement. According to an alternative explanation, the first element means "wain" or "wagon", but the meaning of the full compound is not clear. A place in Essex, in 1460, has a name spelt as "Waynsted".

=== Astronomy ===
In 1707 the astronomer James Pound became rector of Wanstead. In 1717 the Royal Society lent Pound Huygens's 123-foot focal length object-glass, which he set up in Wanstead Park. Pound's observations with it of the five known satellites of Saturn enabled Halley to correct calculations of their movements; and Newton employed, in the third edition of the Principia, his micrometrical measures of Jupiter's disc, of Saturn's disc and ring, and of the elongations of their satellites; and obtained from him data for correcting the places of the comet of 1680. Laplace also used Pound's observations of Jupiter's satellites for the determination of the planet's mass; and Pound himself compiled in 1719 a set of tables for the first satellite, into which he introduced an equation for the transmission of light.

Pound trained his sister's son, James Bradley, and many of their observations were made together, including the opposition of Mars in 1719, and the transit of Mercury on 29 October 1723. Their measurement of γ Virginis in 1718 was the first made of the components of a double star and was directed towards the determination of stellar parallax.

In 1727, Bradley embarked upon a series of observations using a telescope of his own, erected at the rectory in Wanstead, now the site of Wanstead High School. This instrument had the advantage of a large field of view and he was able to obtain precise positions of a large number of stars that transited close to the zenith over the course of about two years. Combined with observations from his friend Samuel Molyneux's house at Kew in Surrey, this established the existence of the phenomenon of aberration of light, and also allowed Bradley to formulate a set of rules that would allow the calculation of the effect on any given star at a specified date.

=== The George public house ===
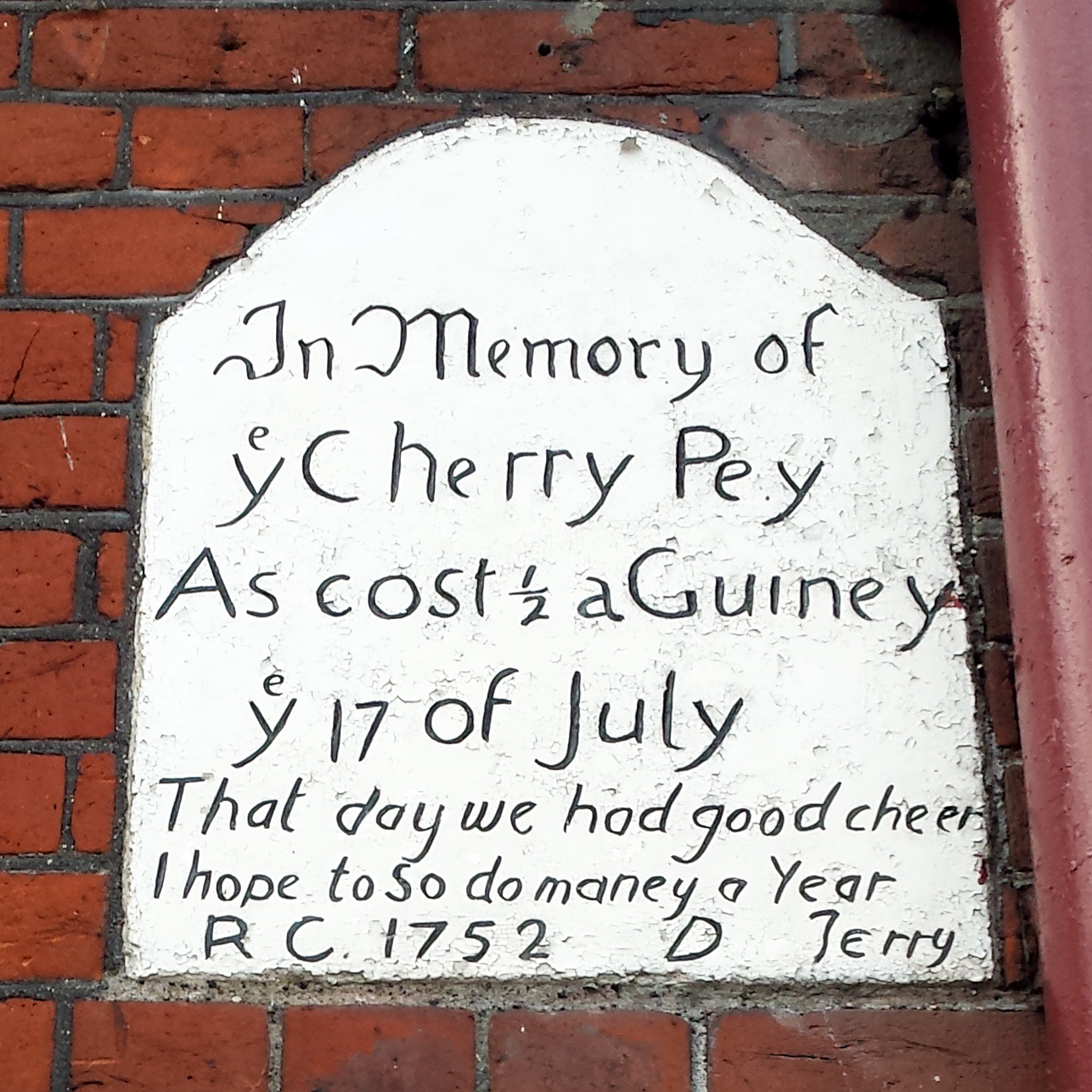
The plaque on the side of The George pub, commemorating a cherry pie

Although current building is from 1903, The George has been a pub on the site since at least 1716. Set in to the side of the pub is a plaque dating from 1752, which was formerly part of an older pub building. The plaque is inscribed with the eccentrically spelled verse:

In Memory of
Ye Cherry Pey
As cost 1/2 a Guiney
Ye 17 of July
That day we had good cheer
I hope to so do maney a Year
R C 1752 D Jerry

There are various local legends explaining this curious plaque, including a tale of the theft of a cherry pie by local workmen who were caught and fined half a guinea (52.5p). However the most likely explanation is that it was placed there by the landlord of 1752, David Jersey (corrupted by centuries of repainting and re-cutting the inscription to D Jerry on the plaque), commemorating a feast which included a huge cherry pie. Monstrous pies were a feature of 18th-century Essex rural festivals; the Galmpton Gooseberry Pie Fair in Devon is still in existence, and other inns around the edge of Epping Forest were famed for pies (rabbit pie at The Reindeer, Loughton, now Warren House, and pigeon pie at The King's Head, Chigwell). Wanstead was well known for its cherry orchards as late as the 1830s, when they were mentioned by poet Thomas Hood, who lived in Wanstead 1832–5.

=== Schools and education ===
The Royal Commercial Travellers Schools were sited in Wanstead from their foundation in 1845 by John Robert Cuffley until their move to Pinner in 1855. The schools at Wanstead provided housing, food, clothing and education for up to 130 children of commercial travellers who had died or became unable to earn their livelihood.

The Royal Merchant Navy School was founded in St George in the East, London in 1827 before moving to Hermon Hill, Wanstead in 1862. The new building provided for 300 orphans of Merchant Navy seamen. It moved again to Bearwood House near Wokingham in 1921. The building then became a convent refuge for women and girls and later Wanstead Hospital.

The Royal Wanstead School was by the Eagle Pond, Snaresbrook up to about 1970. It subsequently became the site of a Crown Court.

Wanstead is home to a large comprehensive school, Wanstead High School. Primary schools in Wanstead include Wanstead Church, Our Lady of Lourdes RC, Aldersbrook and Nightingale.

From 1957 until 1987 Wanstead had a secondary Modern School called Nightingale Secondary Modern School. There was also Nightingale Primary School on the site which is still in existence. These schools were within the boundaries of Ashbourne Avenue, Colvin Gdns. and Elmcroft Ave.

Forest School, Walthamstow is close to Eagle Pond and Snaresbrook Crown Court.

=== Places of worship ===
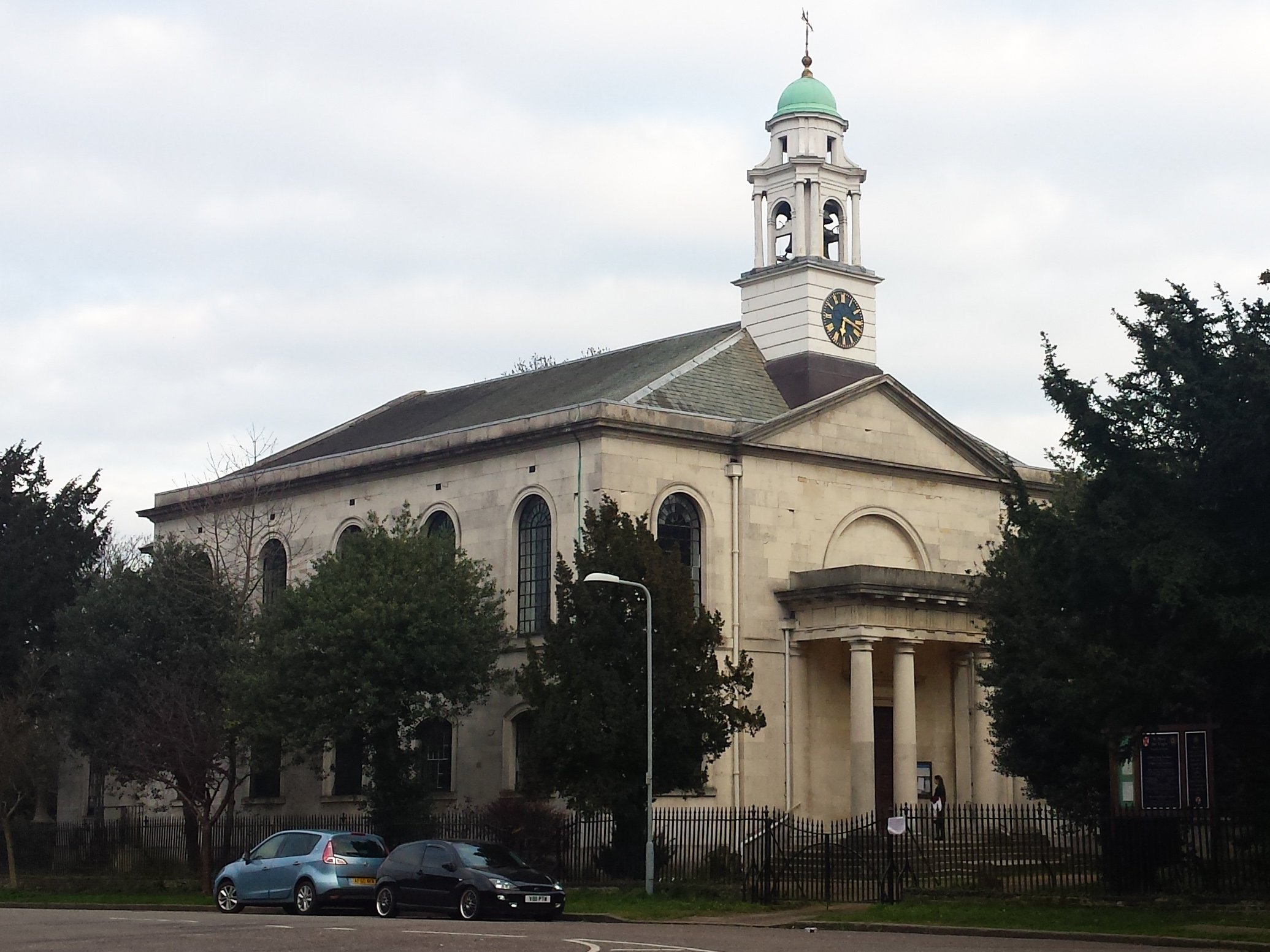
St Mary the Virgin church

The church of St Mary the Virgin, Wanstead was completed in 1790. It is now a Grade I listed building, and contains a large monument to Josiah Child. It was followed in the 1860s by both the Anglican church of Christ Church and Wanstead Congregational Church. Our Lady of Lourdes, Wanstead the local Catholic Church in Cambridge Park was opened in 1928.

=== Administrative history ===
Wanstead was an ancient parish in the Becontree Hundred of Essex. The parish included a salient known as "Wanstead Slip" which ran to the south of Leyton, corresponding to the medieval manor of Cann Hall, which had anciently been in Leyton parish but had been transferred to Wanstead parish by the early 13th century. In 1854, the parish of Wanstead was made a local board district, administered by an elected local board with certain responsibilities relating to public health and local government. In 1875, the Wanstead Slip area was transferred to the Leyton district, whilst remaining part of Wanstead parish.

Under the Local Government Act 1894, local board districts were reconstituted as urban districts. The 1894 Act also directed that civil parishes were no longer allowed to straddle district boundaries, so the Wanstead Slip area that was in the Leyton district became a separate civil parish called Cann Hall, leaving a reduced Wanstead parish matching the Wanstead Urban District. The local board and its successor urban district council were based at offices at the corner of Wanstead Place and Church Path.

Wanstead Urban District and the neighbouring Woodford Urban District were merged into the Wanstead and Woodford Urban District in 1934, which was raised to the status of a municipal borough in 1937. Both parishes and the borough of Wanstead and Woodford was subsequently abolished on 1 April 1965 when the area became part of the London Borough of Redbridge in Greater London. At the 1951 census (one of the last before the abolition of the parish), Wanstead had a population of 23,921.

== Politics ==
Winston Churchill represented Wanstead as MP from 1924 to 1945 when Wanstead formed part of the Epping Constituency, and also when Wanstead lay within the Woodford Constituency, from 1945 to 1964. During this period he served as Prime Minister (1940–1945) during much of the Second World War, and again in peace-time, from 1951 to 1955. There is a bust of Churchill in Wanstead High Street.

== Military activity ==
During the Second World War the tunnels of the as-yet-to-be-commercially used Wanstead underground station were utilised for aircraft production.

Wanstead Flats was used for Anti-Aircraft batteries protecting London, Barracks for Pre-D-Day troops and a Prisoner-of-War Camp subsequently. Due to terminal moraine (left by glaciers) the soil was relatively infertile.

== Underground stations ==
Wanstead has two London Underground stations at either end of the High Street that runs through the town; Snaresbrook and Wanstead on the Central line.

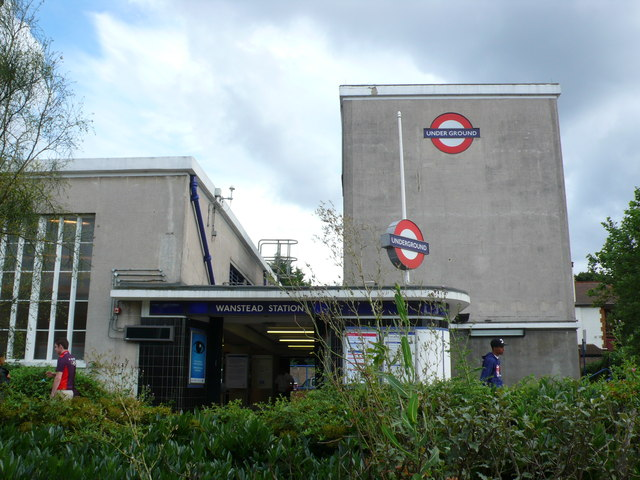
Wanstead London Underground station

== Sports ==
Wandstead F.C. and Woodford and Wanstead F.C. are based in the area.

== Notable residents ==
- Clive Burr, drummer (ex-Samson/Iron Maiden)
- Charles Bressey, civil engineer
- Robert Dudley, Earl of Leicester and favourite of Elizabeth I, owned and lived at Wanstead Hall
- Thomas Hood, poet
- Peter Goddard, physicist and journalist
- Rodney Gordon, architect
- James Holden (locomotive engineer)
- Harriet Kerr, suffragette
- William Penn, Quaker, founder of the Province of Pennsylvania.
- Sir Edward Phelips, Speaker of the House of Commons 1604-1611
- James Pound, astronomer.
- Max Raison (1901–1988), cricketer
- Harry Roberts, criminal
- Richard Brinsley Sheridan, dramatist, lived in the right-hand house of the Georgian Terrace in the High Street near to the George
- Mark Stephens (solicitor), lawyer, mediator, writer and broadcaster
- Colin Ward, social historian, writer and anarchist
- Jessie Wallace, actress, lived in Wanstead
- Tom Watt, actor
- Joseph Wilton, sculptor

== See also ==
- Wanstonia
- Wanstead and Woodford Guardian
- Wanstead Sewage Works
