= Aldersbrook =

Coordinates: 51.5636°N 0.0344°E

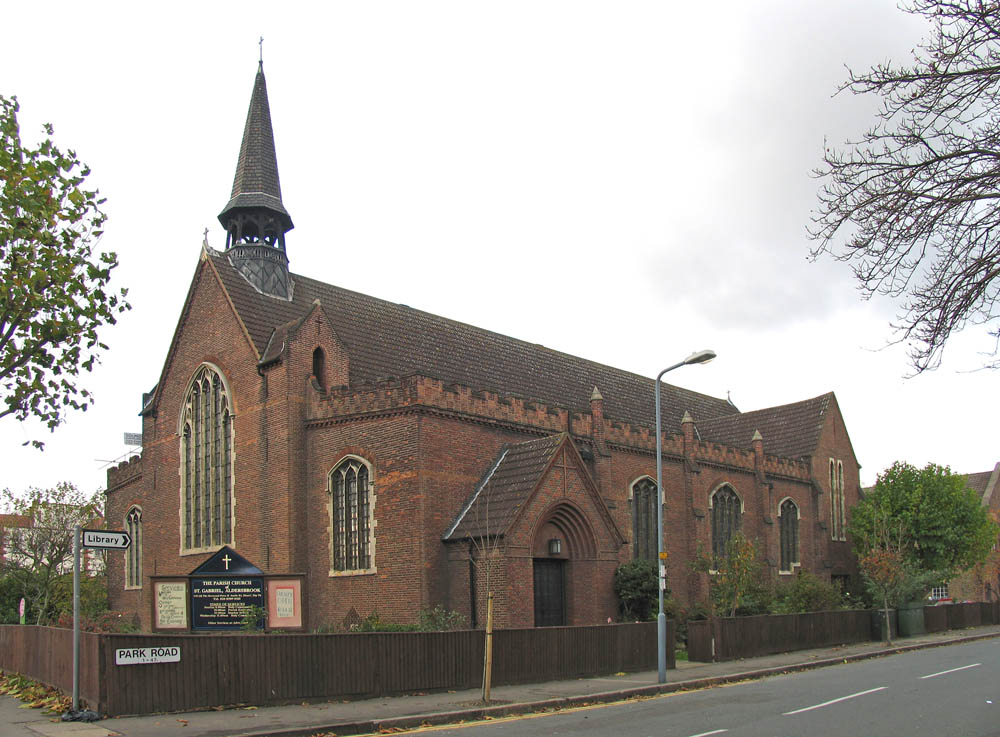
- St Gabriel's church, Aldersbrook

- Location within Greater London
- OS grid reference: TQ411871
- London borough: Redbridge
- Ceremonial county: Greater London
- Region: London
- Country: England
- Sovereign state: United Kingdom
- Post town: LONDON
- Postcode district: E11, E12
- Dialling code: 020
- Police: Metropolitan
- Fire: London
- Ambulance: London
- London Assembly: Havering and Redbridge

Aldersbrook (also known as Aldersbrook Estate), is an Edwardian housing estate in Wanstead, East London. It is named after the medieval Manor of Aldersbrook the manor itself was named after the Alders Brook, a minor river which marks part of the boundary between the London Boroughs of Newham and Redbridge.

The area and the estate now wholly fall within the London Borough of Redbridge, though historically Aldersbrook Manor has always fallen inside the parish of Little Ilford, which is in turn part of what is now the London Borough of Newham.

The 2010 Mike Leigh film Another Year used the area for locations.

== Governance ==
Since 2018, Aldersbrook has been part of the electoral ward of Wanstead Park and elects two councillors to Redbridge London Borough Council.
