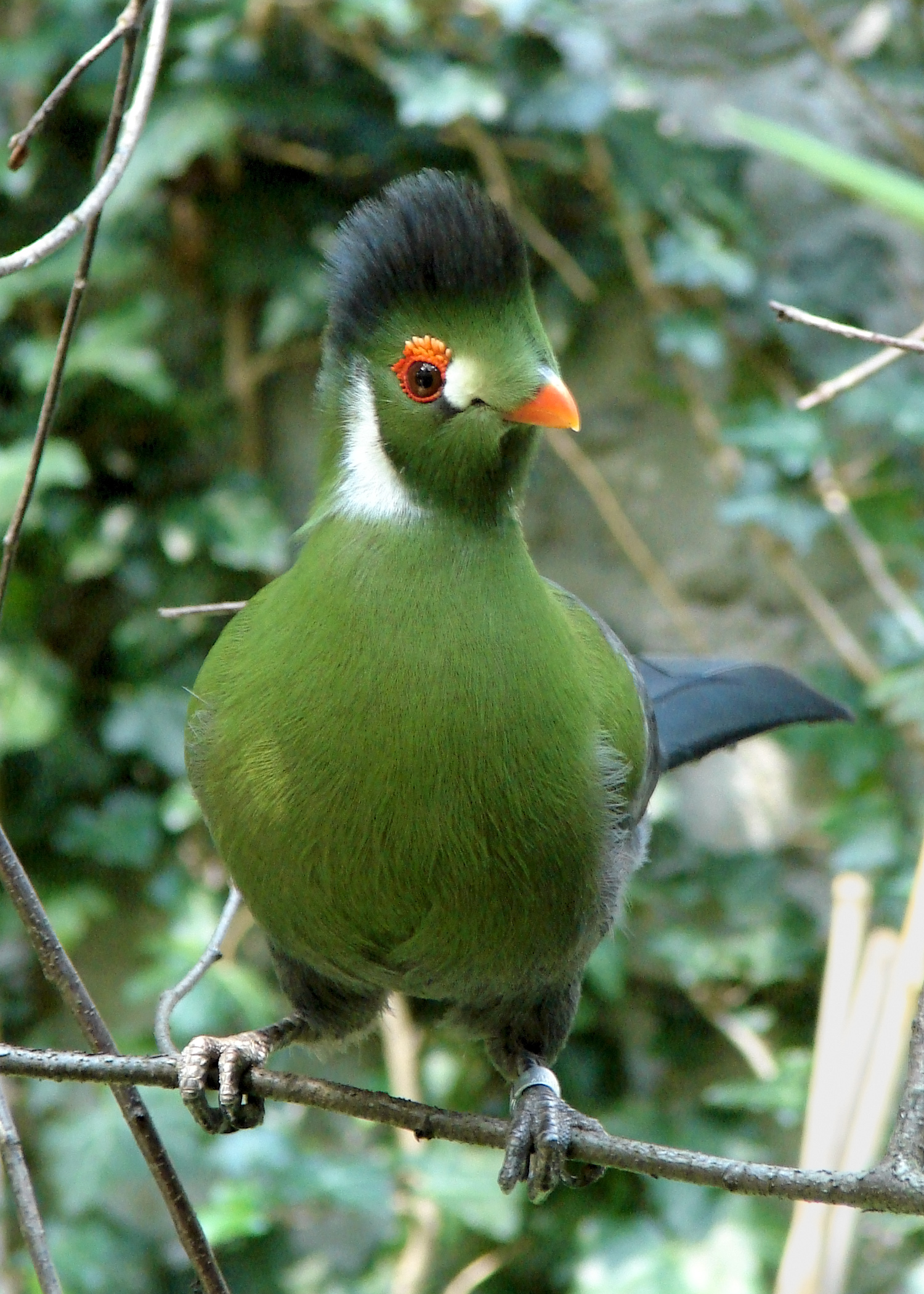

Conservation status
- Least Concern (IUCN 3.1)

Scientific classification
- Kingdom: Animalia
- Phylum: Chordata
- Class: Aves
- Order: Musophagiformes
- Family: Musophagidae
- Genus: Menelikornis
- Species: M. leucotis

Binomial name
- Menelikornis leucotis (Rüppell, 1835)
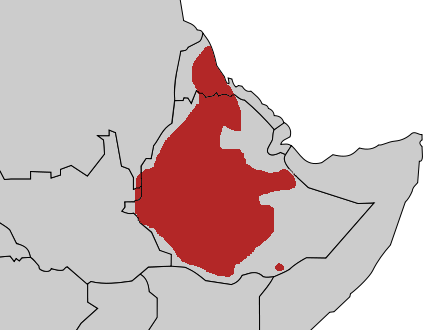

Synonyms
- Tauraco leucotis (Rüppell, 1835)

= White-cheeked turaco =

Species of bird

Voice of a white-cheeked turaco

The white-cheeked turaco (Menelikornis leucotis) is a species of bird in the family Musophagidae. It is found in Eritrea, Ethiopia, and South Sudan. A mid-sized species, it measures about 43 cm (17 in) in length, including a tail of 19 cm (7.5 in), and weighs about 200–315 g (7.1–11.1 oz). This species is the most commonly raised turaco in captive conditions.

== Distribution and habitat ==
The white-cheeked turaco is native to Sudan, South Sudan, Ethiopia and Eritrea, where it is found in Podocarpus and juniper forests in the highland regions.

== Subspecies ==
There are two subspecies, the nominate subspecies M. l. leucotis found in the Podocarpus forests of Eritrea, Ethiopia and southeastern South Sudan and M. l. donaldsoni found in south-central Ethiopia south of the Rift Valley and in the extreme west of Somalia. The latter is quite distinct in plumage colour—the eastern population is separated from the larger population by the escarpment.

The white-crested turaco has been shown to hybridise with the sympatric Ruspoli's turaco (Menelikornis ruspolii) that contributed more to concerns about Ruspoli's turaco that is considered endangered.

== In captivity ==
In captivity a 'cinnamon' colour sport (a recessive colour mutation) first occurred spontaneously in birds bred by David Jones in Gloucestershire, England, and is now present in captive birds in other countries.

A single white-cheeked turaco has been living wild in east London (Leytonstone and South Woodford). The sighting was recorded and confirmed in October 2009. It has survived the climate and potential predators for at least seven years and appears to be living in harmony with native species. It's believed to be an escaped or released pet. Sightings in gardens have continued to delight Londoners and is locally known as 'Bob'. In 2014 another bird (or the same one who fancied a change of scenery perhaps?) was sighted in Langton Green, Kent and has caused much interest to the residents, being featured in the village magazine.

Sightings in East London have continued into 2017 with the turaco seen in January enjoying scraps under bird feeders in residential gardens near Wanstead Park and in July flying around the treetops in Bushwood. It was seen again in the trees opposite St Gabriel's Church, Aldersbrook, and photographed on 30 March 2021. Bob was reported to have died in December 2023. In addition, there have been various sightings of the same (or similar) bird in Wimbledon since April 2016. A turaco was sighted in Havant, Hampshire, in August 2019 and again in May 2020 and again in 2023. It has a ring on the left leg but the bird seen in Havant in 2023 does not have any rings. There have been confirmed sightings in Cardiff, Wales, dating from 2015 and was still alive as of April 2025. This white cheeked turaco is ringed and has been nicknamed Mr Hopkins by some locals of the city's Penylan district. As of August 2023 a pair have been reported and photographed on the Eastern outskirts of Weymouth going back to at least the beginning of 2022.

== Gallery ==
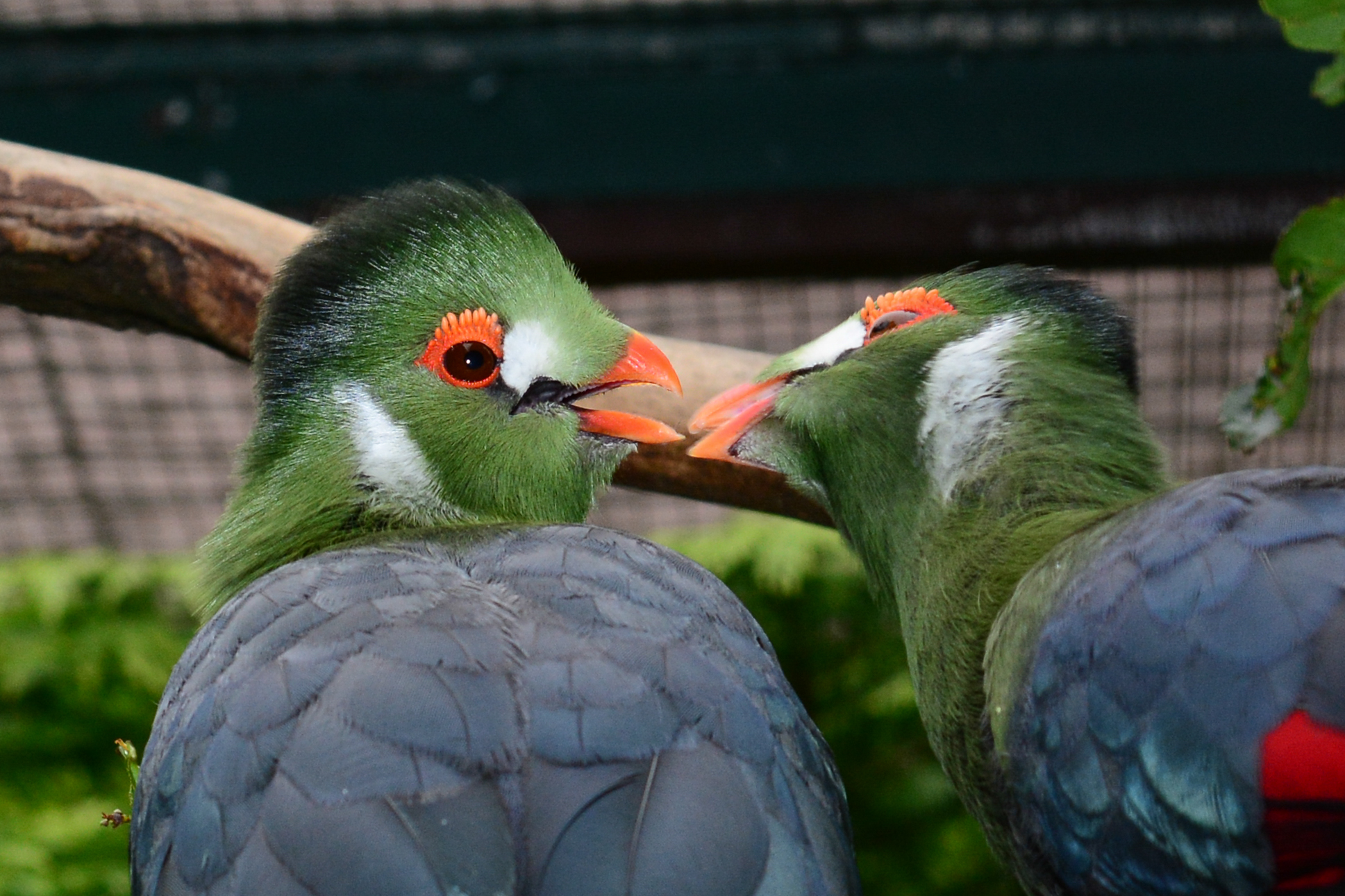

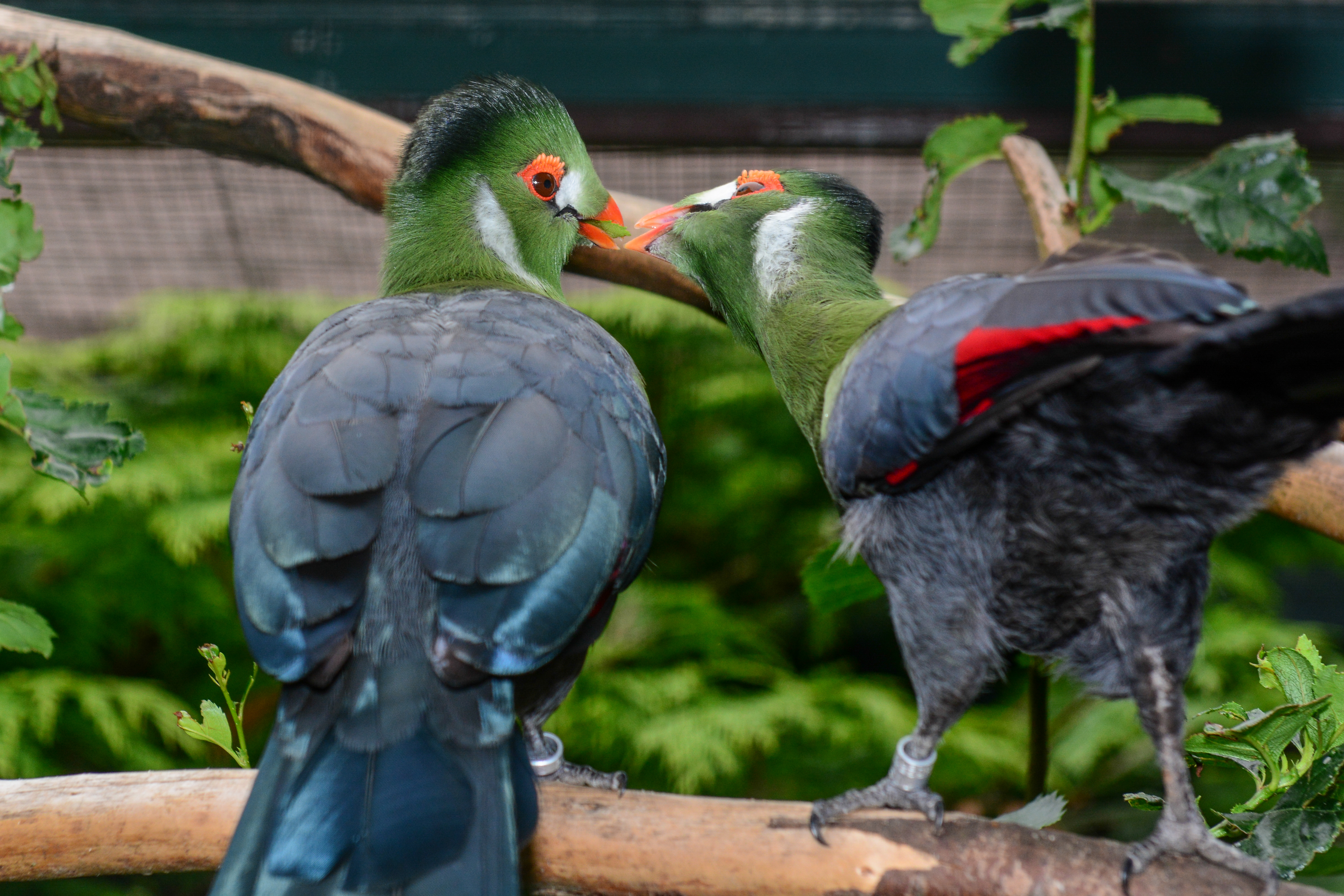

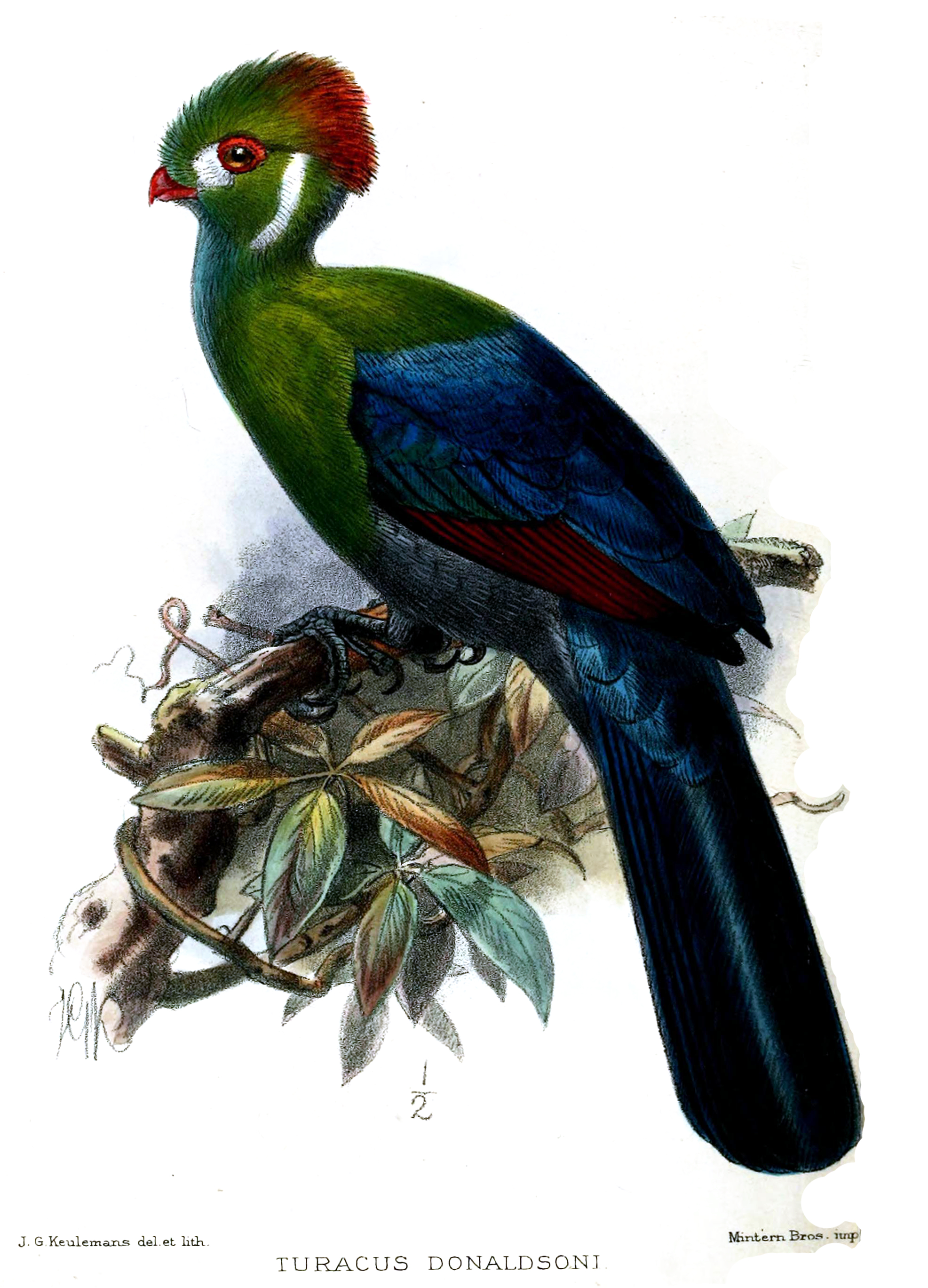

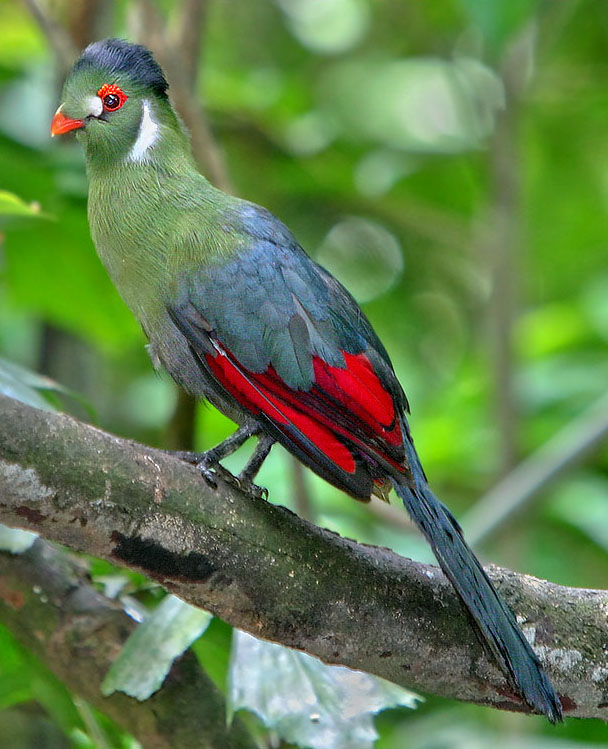

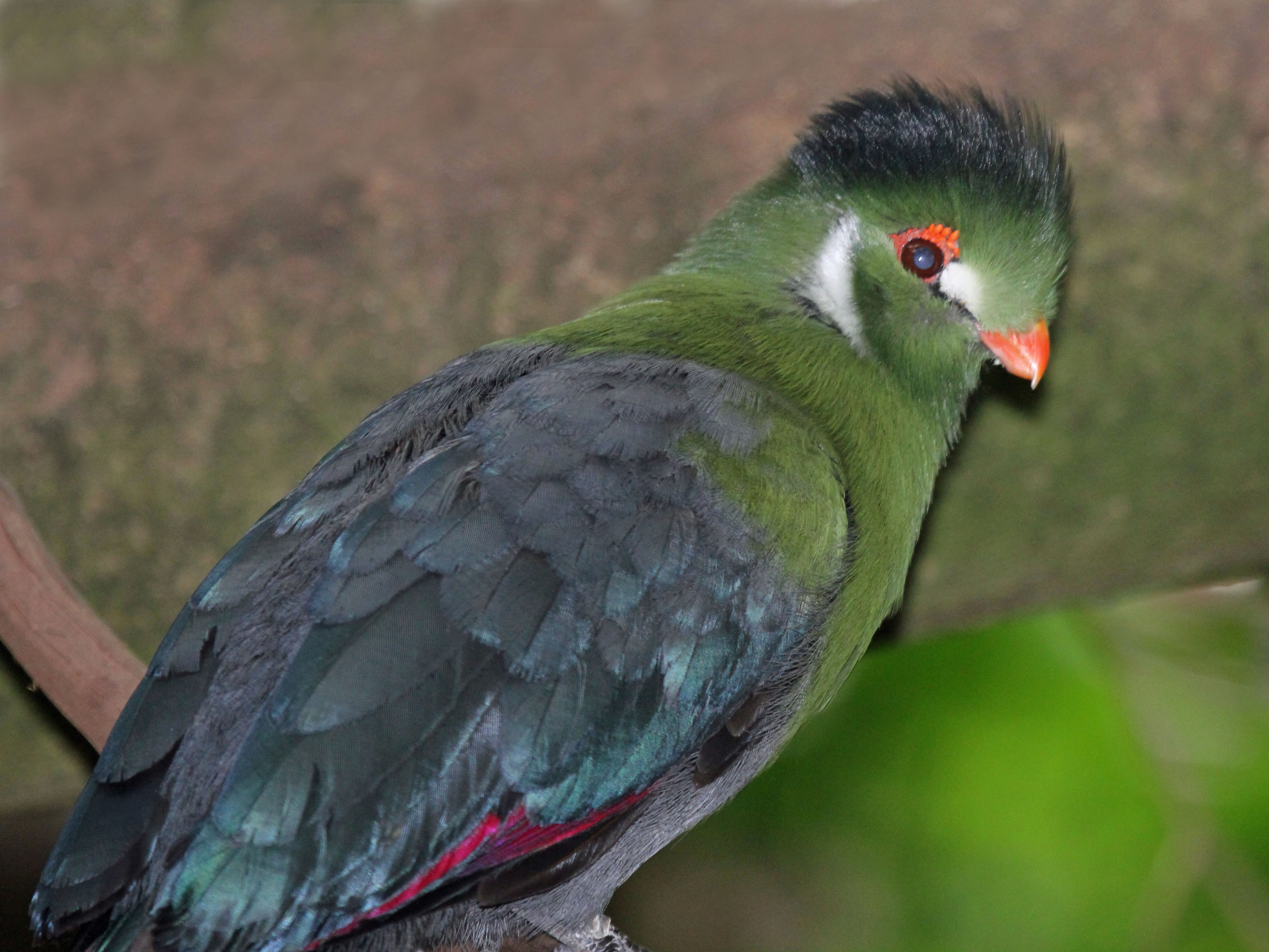

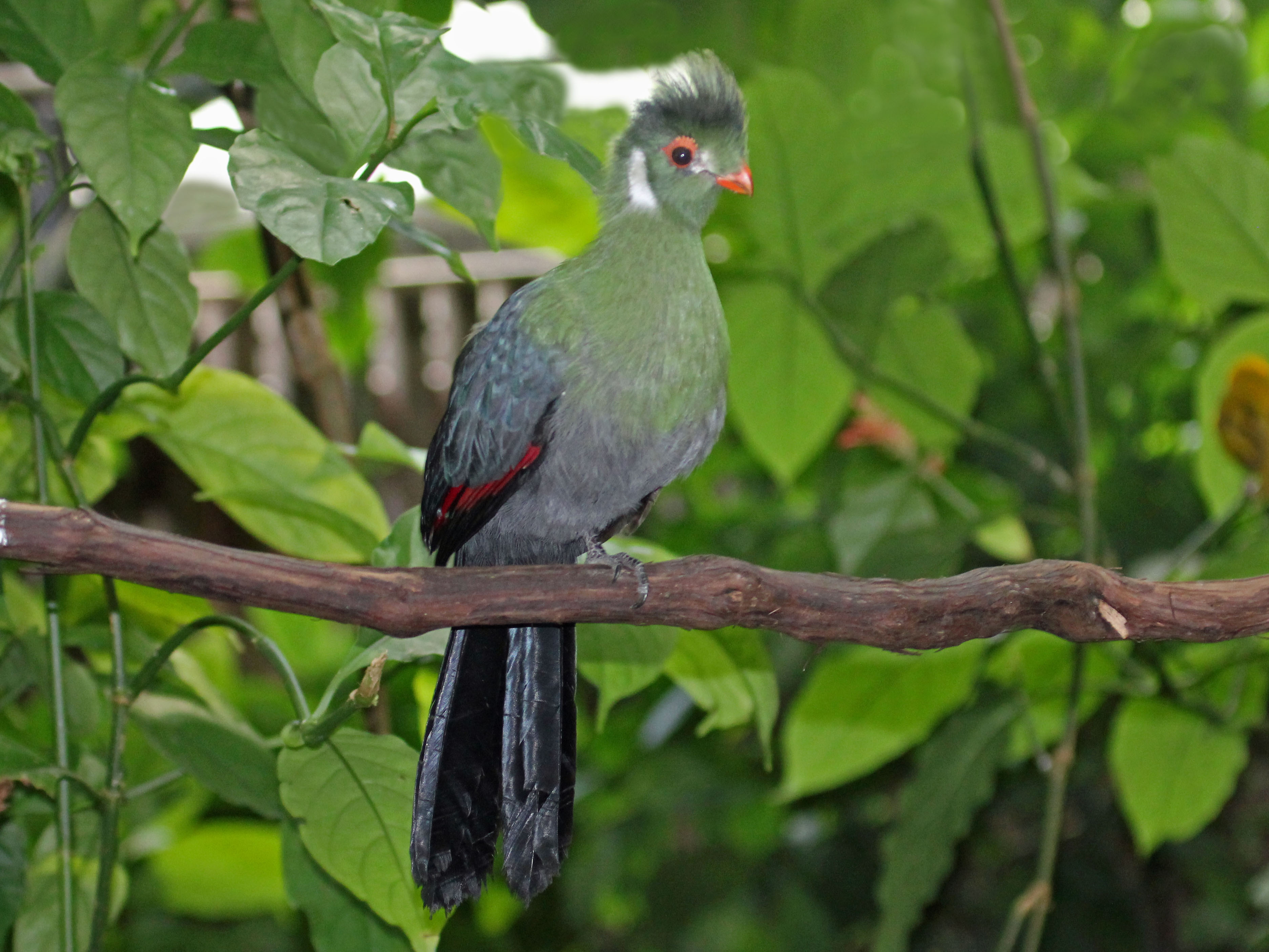
