= St Stephen's Church, Little Ilford =

Roman Catholic parish church in Newham, London, England

Coordinates: 51.5491°N 0.0594°E

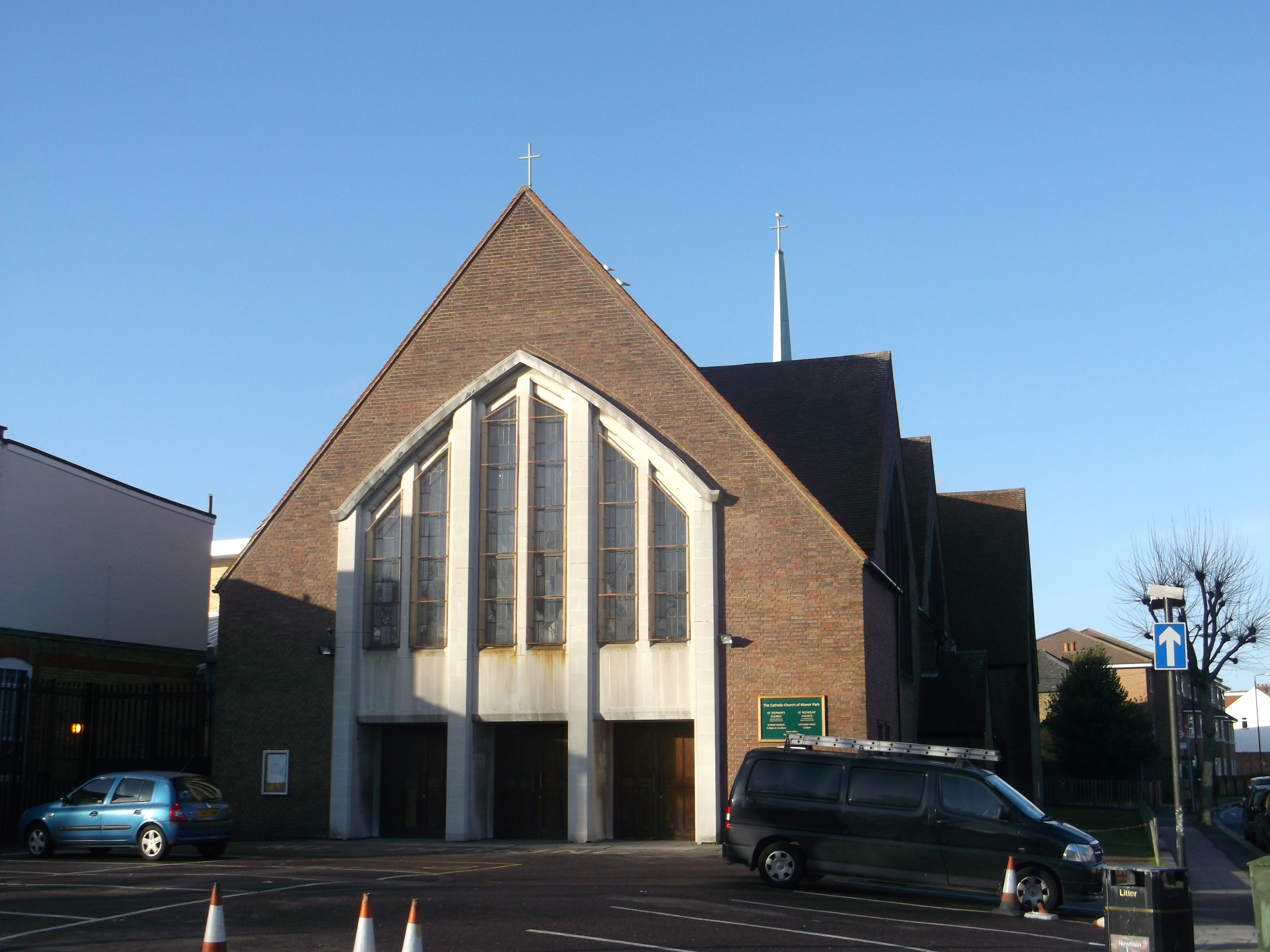

St Stephen's Church, Little Ilford is the Roman Catholic parish church for Little Ilford and Manor Park, two areas in Newham, east London. It was first built in 1924 as a chapel to St Nicholas', Manor Park. St Stephen's was rebuilt in 1959 and became the parish church, with St Nicholas' as its chapel, the status both churches still hold today.
