= Van der Plas =

Van der Plas is a Dutch toponymic surname meaning "from the pool / pond / lake". People with this name include:

- Caroline van der Plas (born 1967), Dutch politician
- Charles van der Plas (1891–1977), Dutch Governor of East Java from 1936 to 1941
- David van der Plas (1647–1704), Dutch portrait painter
- Debora van der Plas (1616–1680), Dutch-born Swedish businesswoman
- Frank van der Plas (born 1960), Dutch comedic actor and singer performing as Ome Henk
- Pieter van der Plas I (c.1590–c.1661), painter active in Brussels

== See also ==
- Parlevliet & van der Plas, international fisheries company
- Vanden Plas, British luxury motor vehicle manufacturer of Belgian origin
- Vanden Plas (band), German progressive metal band
