= P.V. Plas =

Flemish artist, active 1630–1650

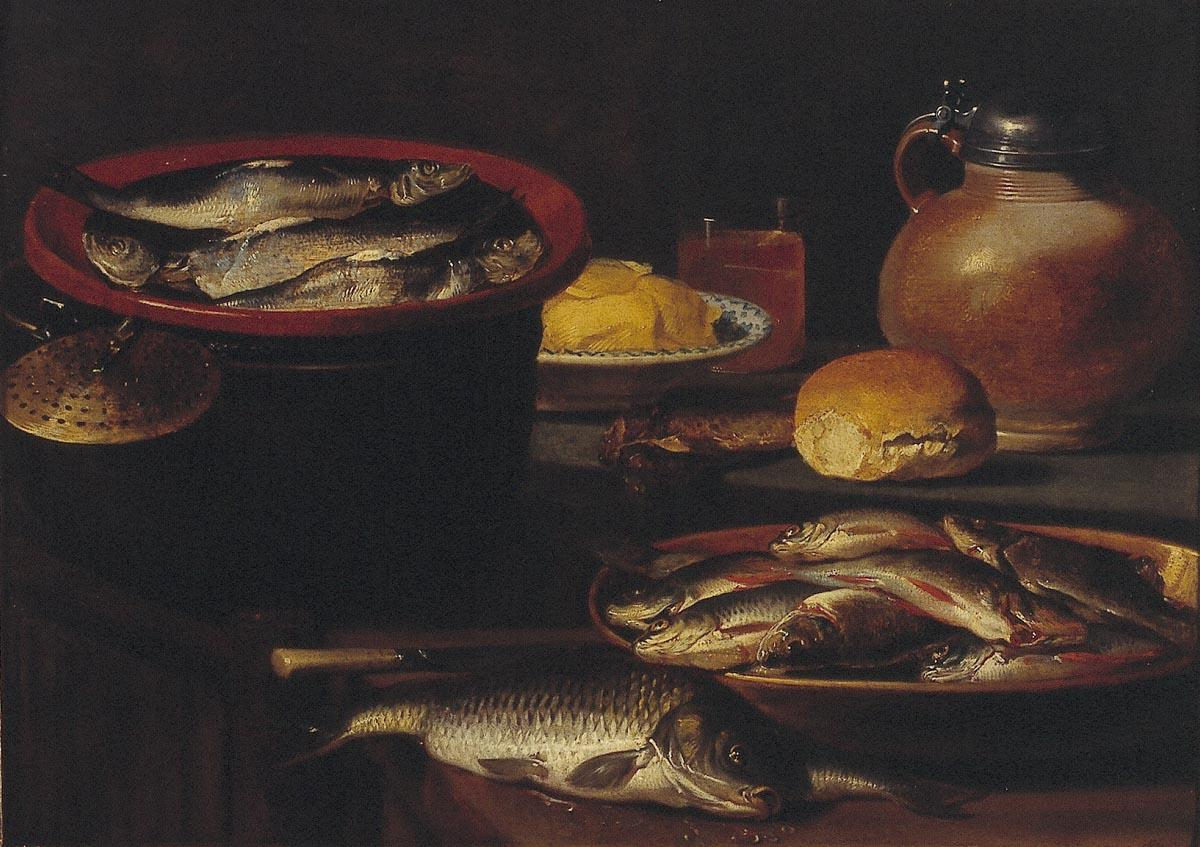
Still life with fish and pitcher

P.V. Plas (fl 1630–1650) was a still life painter active in Brussels between 1630 and 1650.

== Life ==
Little is known about P.V. Plas. He may be identical with the Pieter van de Plassen, who was born near Alkmaar who became a member of the painter's guild in Brussels and obtained citizenship there on 22 September 1636. P.V. Plas is only known for his activity in Brussels in the period from 1630 to 1650.

The artist is often confused with the painters Pieter van der Plas I and Pieter van der Plas II. Pieter van der Plas I was a portrait painter active in Brussels between 1610 and 1650.

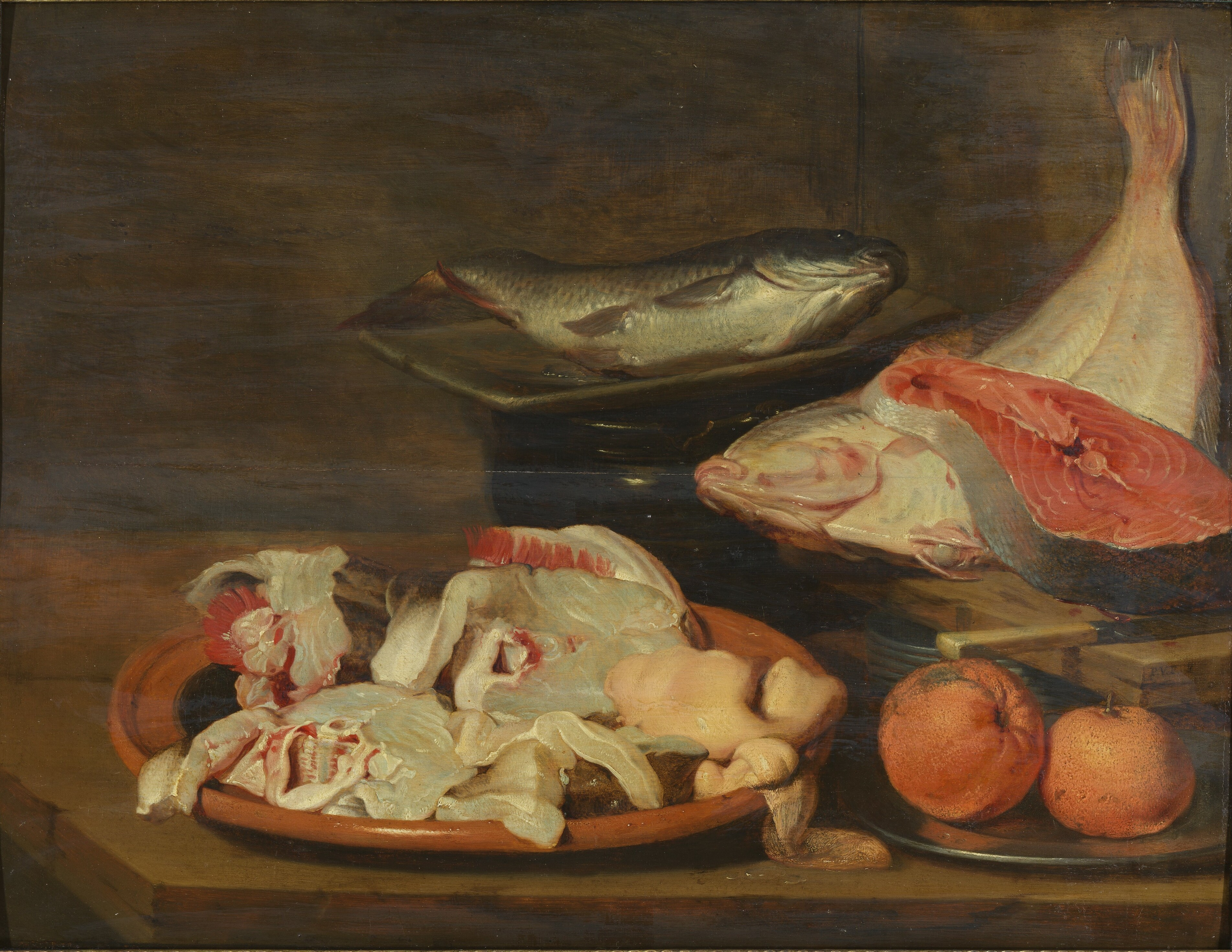
Still life with fish and fruit

== Work ==
P.V. Plas was a still life painter who worked in the Flemish style. His signature in monogram P.V.P. monogram is found on a banquet still life with fruits, etc. in the LVR-LandesMuseum Bonn and on a fish still life in Chalon-sur-Saône. The P.V.P. monogram is also found on a similar, early work, probably painted in Flanders, at a Sotheby's sale on 9 June 1982, with an unsigned Still life with fish and fruit as its counterpart. The latter painting is in the collection of the Sörmland Museum.
