= James Pound =

English astronomer

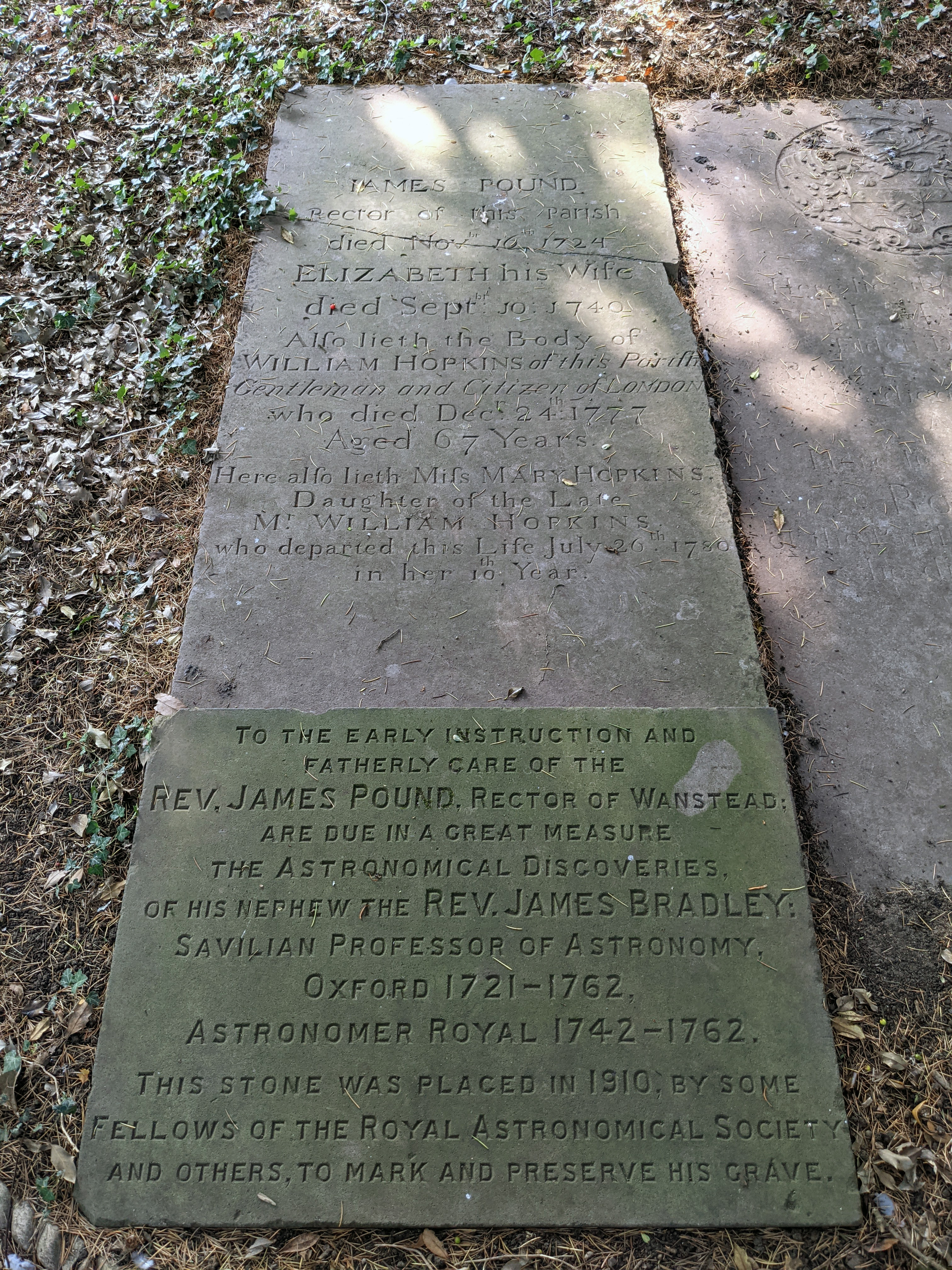
Pound's grave in the churchyard of St Mary the Virgin, Wanstead, and a stone placed later to commemorate his instruction of James Bradley

James Pound (1669–1724) was an English clergyman and astronomer.

== Life ==
He was the son of John Pound, of Bishops Cannings, Wiltshire, where he was born. He matriculated at St. Mary Hall, Oxford, on 16 March 1687; graduated B.A. from Hart Hall on 27 February 1694, and M.A. from Gloucester Hall in the same year; and obtained a medical diploma, with a degree of M.B., on 21 October 1697.

Having taken orders, he entered the service of the East India Company, and went out to Madras in 1699 as chaplain to the merchants of Fort St. George. Whence he proceeded to the British settlement on Pulo Condore (now Côn Sơn Island) near the mouth of the Mekong River. On the morning of 3 March 1705 the company's local troops at Pulo Condore mutinied, and only eleven of the English residents escaped in the sloop Rose to Malacca, and ultimately reached Batavia. Pound was among the refugees, but his collections and papers were destroyed.

A year after his return to England, in July 1707, Pound was presented by Sir Richard Child to the rectory of Wanstead in Essex; and the influence of Lord Chancellor Parker secured for him, in January 1720, on John Flamsteed's death, the living of Burstow in Surrey. He was elected a Fellow of the Royal Society on 30 November 1699, but his admittance was deferred until 30 July 1713. Edmund Halley communicated to the Royal Society his phase-determinations of the total solar eclipse of 3 May 1715. Using a fifteen-foot telescope, Pound observed an occultation of a star by Jupiter on 30 July 1715, an eclipse of the moon on 30 October that same year, and continued to make various planetary observations in 1716 and 1717.

Huygens's 123-foot focal length object-glass, lent to Pound in 1717 by the Royal Society, was mounted by him on the grounds of Wanstead House on the maypole just removed from the Strand and procured for the purpose by Sir Isaac Newton. The inconveniences of this instrument were commented upon by Joseph Crosthwait. Pound's observations with it of the five known satellites of Saturn enabled Halley to correct their movements. In the third edition of the Principia, Newton employed his micrometrical measures of Jupiter's disc, of Saturn's disc and ring, and of the elongations of their satellites; and obtained from him data for correcting the places of the comet of 1680. Laplace also used Pound's observations of Jupiter's satellites to determine the planet's mass, and Pound himself compiled in 1719 a set of tables for the first satellite, into which he introduced an equation for the transmission of light.

Pound trained his sister's son, James Bradley, and many of their observations were made together, including the opposition of Mars in 1719, and the transit of Mercury on 29 October 1723. Their measurement of γ Virginis in 1718 was the first made of the components of a double star and was directed towards the determination of stellar parallax.

Pound was a frequent visitor to Samuel Molyneux at Kew. In July 1723, he was commissioned by the Royal Society to test John Hadley's reflecting telescope and reported favorably on its performance. He died at Wanstead on 16 November 1724, aged 55.

== Family ==
He married, first, on 14 February 1710, Sarah, widow of Edward Farmer, who died in June 1715; and secondly, in October 1722, Elizabeth, sister of Matthew Wymondesold, a successful speculator in South Sea stock, and proprietor of the Wanstead estate. She had a fortune of £10,000. After her husband's death, she resided with Bradley at Oxford, 1732–7, died on 10 September 1740, and was buried at Wanstead. By his first wife Pound left a daughter Sarah, born on 16 September 1713; she died at Greenwich, unmarried, on 19 October 1747.
