= Aldersbrook Estate =

Housing estate in Wanstead, east London

Coordinates: 51.5629°N 0.0375°E

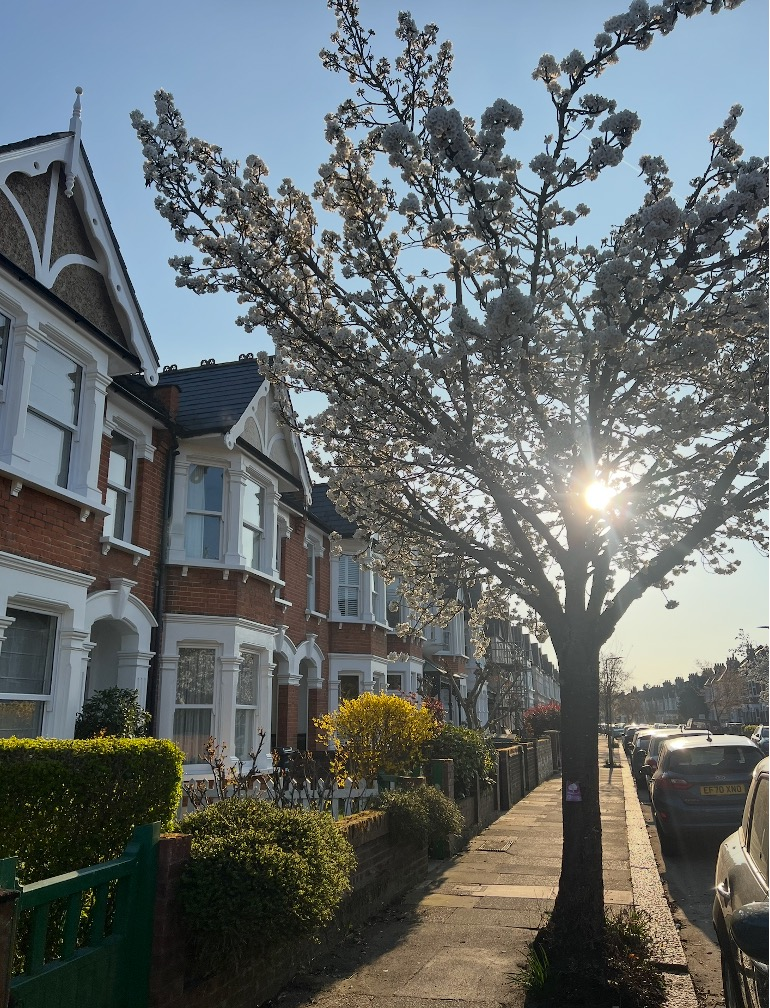
Dover Road, Aldersbrook

The Aldersbrook Estate is the name given to an Edwardian housing estate in Aldersbrook, Wanstead, in the London Borough of Redbridge. The built-up area is surrounded on all sides by open space and parkland, including Wanstead Park, Wanstead Flats, Bush Wood and the City of London Cemetery and Crematorium.

There are no public houses, except the bar of the Courtney Hotel, which is at the extreme south-eastern corner of the estate, something that may reflect the generally pro-temperance Edwardian era in which the estate was laid out, or was perhaps due to restrictive covenant. There is also a bowls club that has a small bar in it, located on Aldersbrook road.

There is a school, Aldersbrook Primary School, a library on Park Road and two churches, the Anglican St Gabriel's and Aldersbrook Baptist Church. There is a short strip of shops on Aldersbrook Road, in the south-eastern corner of the estate, a convenience store in the western end of the estate, behind the Anglican church, and a launderette and another convenience store at the eastern side of the estate.

== History ==
While the greater body of the estate was laid out in the 1910s, which defines its overall character, there are smaller areas of more recent post-war development. Brading Crescent area was laid out as a mix of council housing styles in the 1950s: terraces, sheltered housing, and one high-rise block called Jackson Court. At the extreme eastern edge of the estate, behind Clavering Road, are small courtyards of flat-roofed terraced housing laid out in the late 1960s. On the site of the former maternity hospital, modern houses and flats were laid out in the mid-1980s to form Alders Close. There is also a tiny pocket of land directly behind the wall of the Primary School which was developed into Albury Mews in the late 1980s.

The estate was designated a Conservation area by Redbridge London Borough Council in 2002.
