= St Gabriel's Church, Aldersbrook =

Church in Redbridge, London, England

Coordinates: 51°33′47.6″N 0°1′57″E

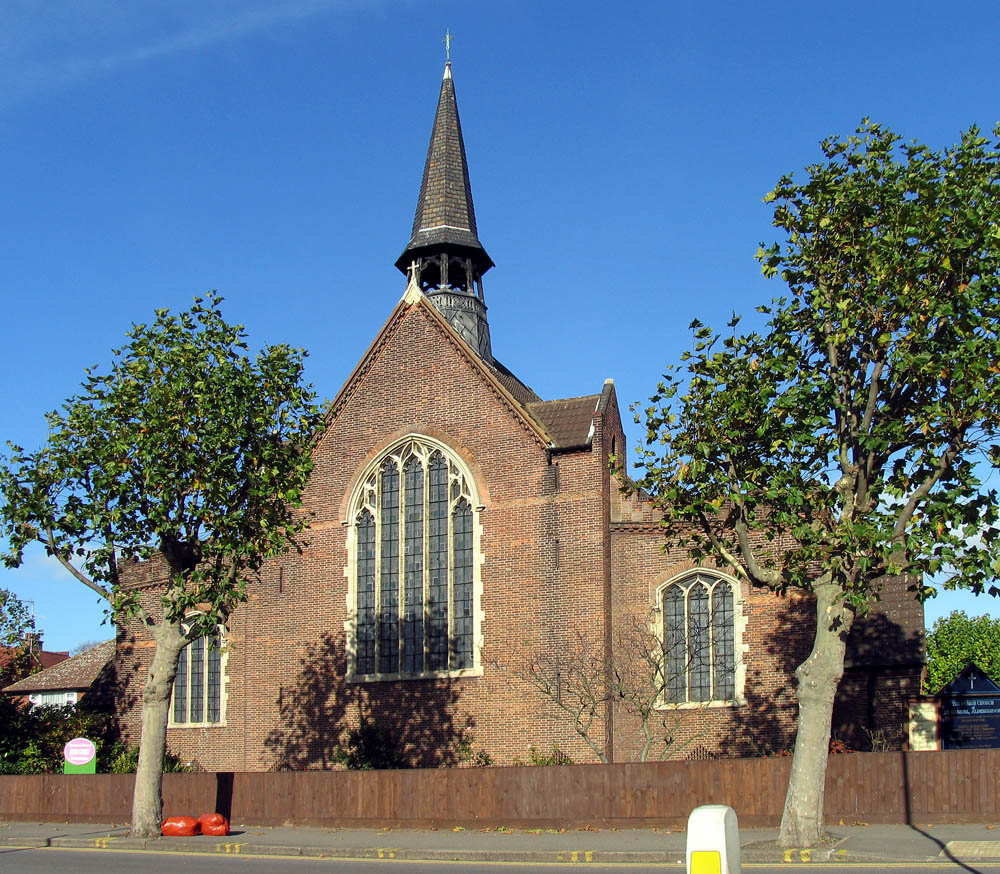
St Gabriel, Aldersbrook Road, London E11 in 2004.

St Gabriel's Church is a Church of England parish church in the Aldersbrook estate area of Wanstead in the London Borough of Redbridge, dedicated to the archangel Gabriel. It began in 1903 as an iron building before a permanent brick church by Charles Spooner in the Perpendicular iteration of the neo-Gothic style was completed in 1914, the same year as St Gabriel's was granted its own parish, taking areas from the parishes of St Mary the Virgin, Wanstead, and St Mary's Church, Little Ilford.
