= Leonora Marescoe =

English merchant (1637–1715)

- Born: Leonora Lethieullier; 1637
- Died: 1715 (aged 77–78)
- Spouse(s): Charles Marescoe (1658-1670, his death)

Leonora Marescoe, née Lethieullier or Lethiulliers (1637 – 1715) was an English merchant. She managed the trading company Marescoe-Joyes from 1670 until 1675.

Leonora Marescoe was the daughter of a successful merchant and was one of the most noted members of the merchant class in Restoration period London, part of a London colony of Huguenots from the Spanish Netherlands. Her brother was Sir John Lethieullier. She married in 1658 to Charles Marescoe, with the same background and who was one of the most successful merchants in London during the 1660s. After the death of her spouse in 1670, she took over the company. The Marescoe-Joyes belonged to the greatest elite trading houses in London. One of its main trades was that of copper with contacts in the Baltic Sea and Stockholm, where one of her most noted business partners was Debora van der Plas. In 1675, she married the former student of her spouse, Jacob David.
