= Our Lady of Lourdes, Wanstead =

Coordinates: 51°34′28″N 0°1′27″E

- The Parish Church of Our Lady Of Lourdes, Wanstead
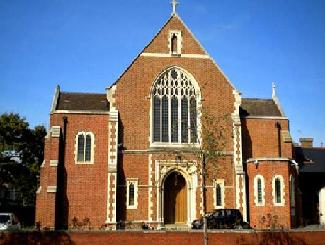
- Our Lady of Lourdes Church viewed from the front
- Our Lady of Lourdes, Wanstead
- Location: 51 Cambridge Park, Wanstead, London E11 2PR
- Country: England
- Denomination: Catholic
- Website: www.ourladyoflourdeswanstead.com

History
- Founded: 1919 (parish); 1928 (church building)
- Dedication: Our Lady of Lourdes

Administration
- Diocese: Brentwood
- Deanery: Redbridge
- Parish: Wanstead

Clergy
- Priest: Fr Martin Boland

Our Lady of Lourdes church is the Catholic parish church for Wanstead in the London Borough of Redbridge and parts of Leytonstone in the London Borough of Waltham Forest. The parish is part of the Diocese of Brentwood.

== History ==
A mass centre was opened in Wanstead in 1910 by the parish priest of Walthamstow. In 1918 it was transferred to the hall of the newly opened St. Joseph's convent school, Cambridge Park. Wanstead became a separate parish in 1919, and the church was opened in 1928, and completed in 1934–39.

The first parish priest, Canon Basil Booker, was appointed on 4 August 1919. The second parish priest, Canon James Hemming, was appointed in 1952. In 1970, a new parish priest was appointed, Mgr (Canon) Christopher Creede VG.

After 30 years as parish priest, Mgr Creede retired on the Feast of Our Lady of Lourdes 11 February 2000 and Fr (Canon) Patrick Sammon arrived to become the fourth parish priest.

One of the first projects Fr Sammon undertook was the building of the Pastoral Centre next to the church. The building includes 5 meeting rooms and a large hall for parish events.

On 11 February 2022 Bishop Alan Williams blessed two new statues of Our Lady of Lourdes and St Bernadette located in a grotto by the side of the Church.

After over 22 years as parish priest Canon Sammon died on 16 September 2022.

== Architecture ==
The church was built in the Neo-Gothic style. The church exterior is of red brick with cream stone edgings. Inside, the plan is that of a nave and two aisles on either side. At the back, over the entrance, there is the choir balcony, on which a new organ has been constructed. The interior walls are simply whitewashed, excluding the stonework. Behind the altar is an elaborate stone gothic altarpiece.

Two stained glass windows are on the left aisle side chapel and were installed as part of the major reordering and restoration project of the church including the relocation of the tabernacle and a new stone Altar

The church has a large crucifix stationed above the new Altar.

In 2019 new hand-painted Stations of the Cross were commissioned and installed around the church.

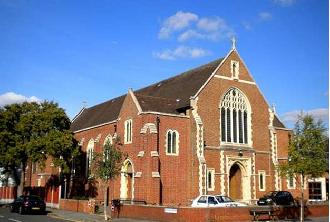
Exterior seen from Cambridge Park
