= Wanstead Park =

Park in Wanstead, London

Coordinates: 51.5676°N 0.0403°E

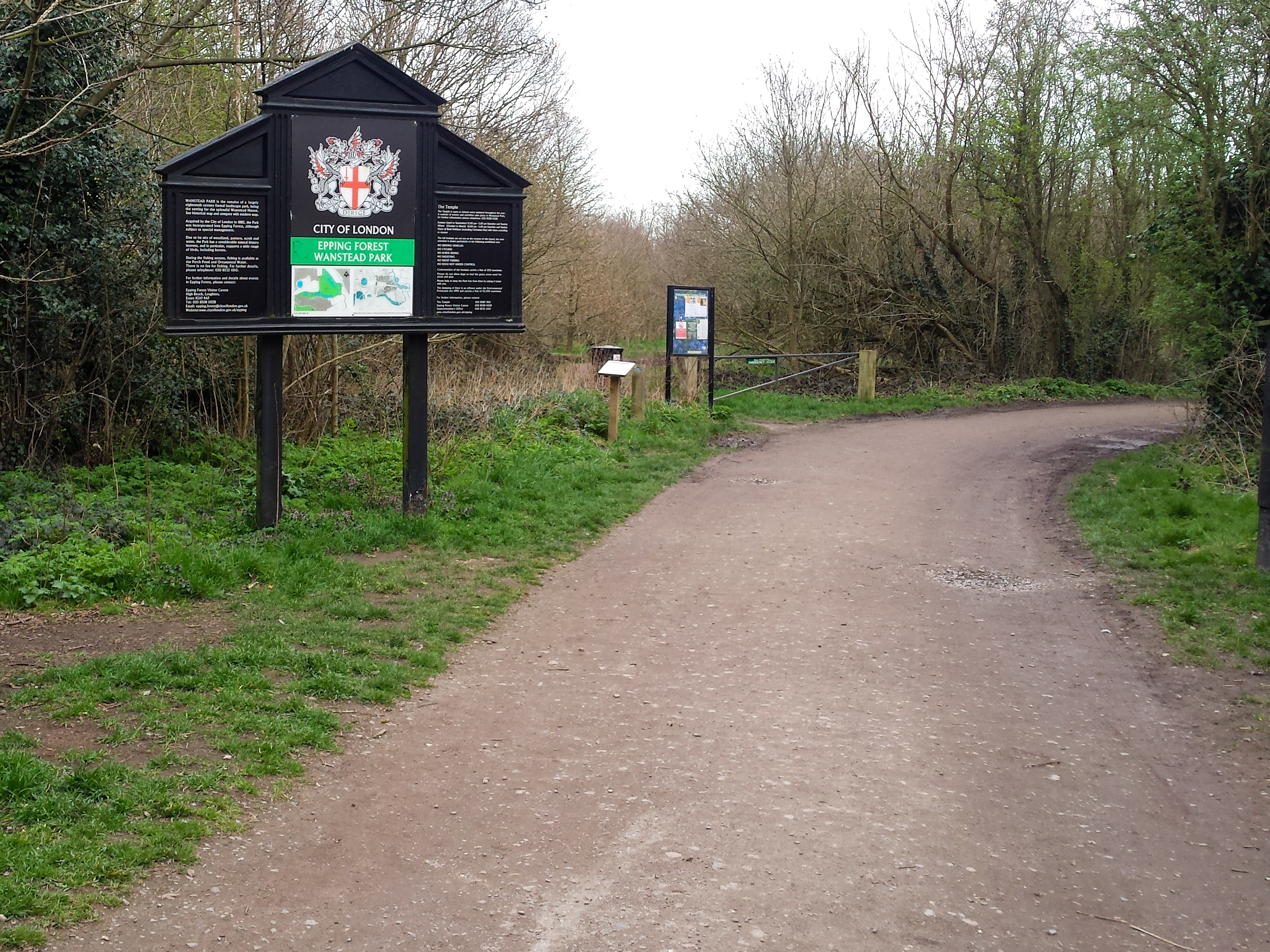
Entrance to Wanstead Park.

Wanstead Park is a municipal park covering an area of about 140 acres (57 hectares), in Wanstead, in the London Borough of Redbridge. It is also a district of the London Borough of Redbridge, which was in Essex until 1965.

It is administered as part of Epping Forest by the City of London Corporation, having been purchased by the Corporation in 1880 from Henry Wellesley, 1st Earl Cowley. Today's park once formed part of the deer park of the former manor house of ancient Wanstead Manor, which included much of the urbanised area now known as Wanstead. The present park retains some of the layout of its former existence as Wanstead House's grounds, though the park's western boundary lies some 330 yards east of the house's site. In 1992 a Management Plan was initiated to try to re-establish something of the formality of the grounds of a "Great House".

The park is Grade II* listed on the Register of Historic Parks and Gardens.

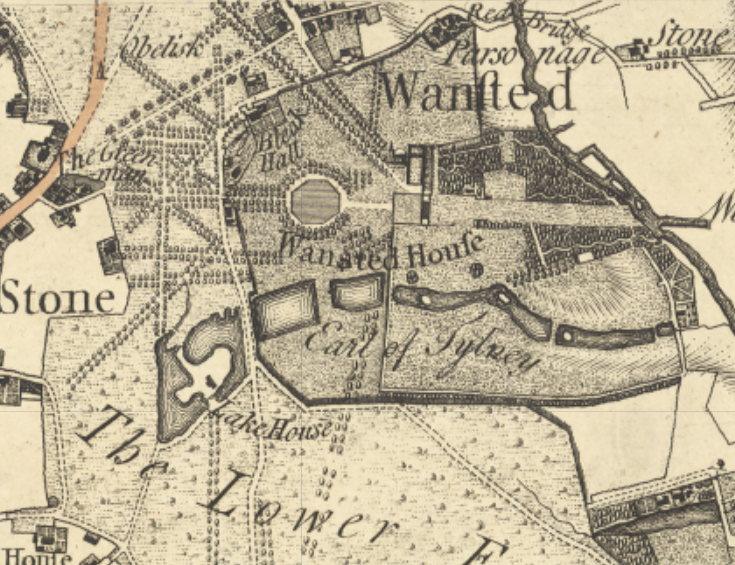
Wanstead Park, Chapman and Andre Map of Essex, 1777

== Location and access ==
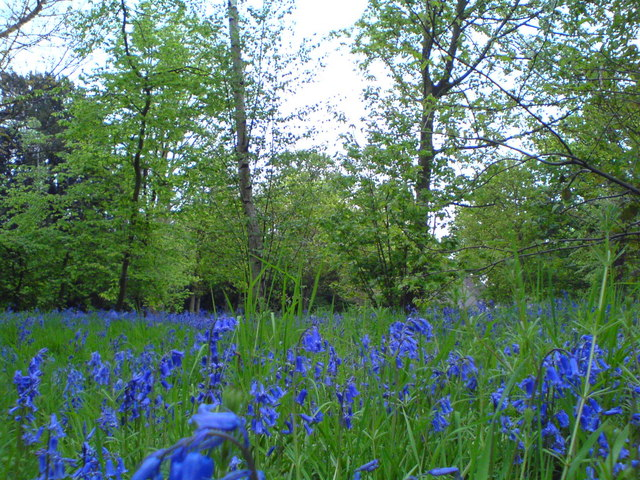
Bluebells in Wanstead Park

The park is bordered to the north by the A12 road, to the east by the River Roding and A406 North Circular Road, to the south by the Aldersbrook Estate, the site of the former Wanstead Sewage Works and the City of London Cemetery and Crematorium and to the west by Wanstead Golf Course.

The park is approached from Wanstead in the north via Warren Road. The road at the entrance to the Park is not under the management of the local council, and the un-surfaced section of it, which separates the park from the golf course, ends at a well-known landmark by the Heron pond called the "Posts". Along the east side of the unmade road there are several entrances to the park. One leads to the Glade, a broad grassy ride cut through the woodland and running in a direct easterly line from the former site of the house - it extends five hundred yards due east down to the Ornamental Pond. The other main entrance for pedestrians is at the north-east corner of the park, from Wanstead Park Road south of Redbridge tube station, via the footpath crossing the busy A406 North Circular Road.

- Winter opening hours for the Visitor's Centre, The Temple (October–March): 10:00 – 3:00 pm
- Summer opening hours for the Visitor's Centre, The Temple (April–September): 12:00 – 5:00 pm

== Activities and events ==
In late April the Chalet Wood is awash with flowering bluebells. The Temple is open every weekend with displays on the history of Wanstead Park including finds excavated from the 18th-century grotto and the 'Lost Roman Villa'. Entrance is free and there is also a shop offering free leaflets on Epping Forest, other guides and booklets, as well as traditional toys and other attractive items. The City of London Corporation runs a programme of events at the Temple and its surrounds, including family craft days, open-air theatre and musical performances. The City of London website provides further details. Fishing is permitted on the Ornamental Waters and the Perch Pond, but only in season.

== Ecology ==
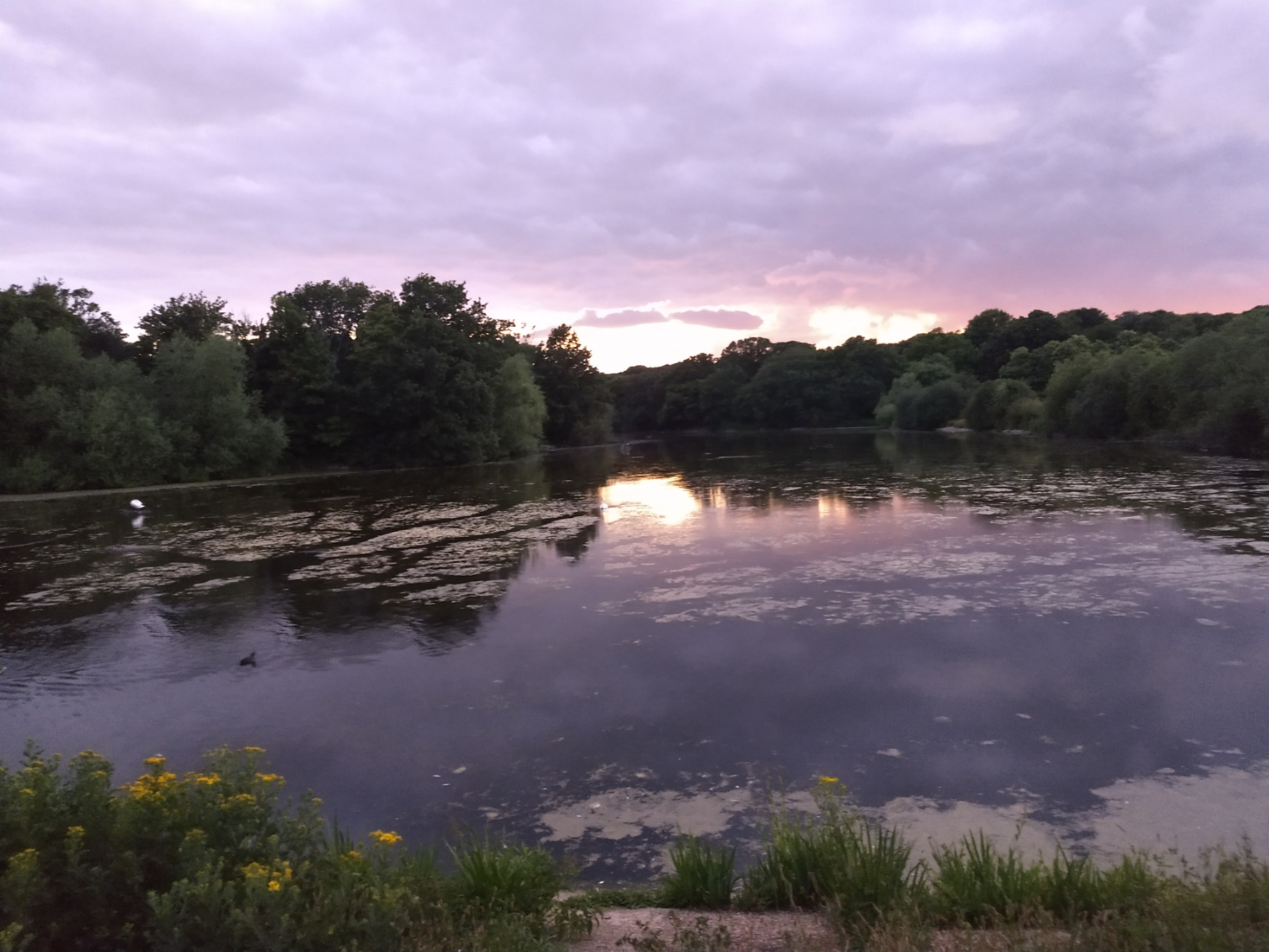
Wanstead Park at Dusk

Trees include a 346-year-old European oak, which in 2020 was dying and losing branches, a further 330 to 340-year-old European oak, a 280 to 300-year-old wych elm, a Eurasian aspen, and a 465 to 480-year-old European yew. Many European beech trees are over 200 years old. Areas contain common rhododendron, which is considered invasive in Britain. There are areas of grassland, and broadleaved woodland with glades. Bluebells grow in the woods, and common gorse along one lake. Fauna includes Eastern gray squirrels, red foxes, Canada geese, and mute swans. Parakeets are evident in the Summer.

Recently introduced paths have opened up further areas of the park. Soil degradation is common because of high levels of human activity, with litter a further problem. The lakes often dry out in summer, leading to less aquatic life.

== Sources ==
- Wanstead House and the Parklands - a History, www.wansteadwildlife.org.uk. (June 2010). This article has drawn heavily from this source.
- Cornish, Alan. M.Sc. Wanstead Park - A Chronicle. (Originally published by the Friends of Wanstead Parklands in 1982, updated and republished by Wanstead Parklands Community Project in 2006.)
- Starkey, David. Henry: Virtuous Prince. London, 2008.(Tudor history of Wanstead)
- Ramsey, Winston G. & Fowkes, Reginald L. Epping Forest: Then and Now. Published by Battle of Britain Prints International Ltd., 1986.
