= Aldersbrook Manor =

Aldersbrook Manor or the Manor of Aldersbrook was a feudal manor in the parish of Little Ilford, now part of the London Borough of Newham. It was named after the Alders Brook which flowed through it and the manor's lands mostly now mostly fall within the City of London Cemetery and Crematorium, with its manor house about halfway between the Cemetery's catacombs and its eastern boundary fence. It was known as Aldersbrook House and also had an associated farmhouse about 0.3 km to its west.

The lands it covers originally formed part of the manor of Wanstead. It seems to have originated as the tenement of Naget (later Naked) hall, recorded as held from Barking Abbey by John Huntercombe and his wife Margaret at his death in 1383 along with Wanstead and the tenement of Sayes. Naget Hall seems to have descended with Wanstead until around 1512, when it was made a separate manor called Aldersbrook Manor, at around the same time as Wanstead was enclosed - the two manors remained closely linked, with boundary disputes between them in the 1500s and 1600s. Aldersbrook was sold to the crown in 1532 by Sir Giles Heron, holder of manor of Wanstead - it was then known as Naked Hall (Hawe) or Alderbroke. Three years later it was granted to Anthony Knevett and his wife, before being sold by the crown to Katherine Addington in 1544, to Robert Dudley, Earl of Leicester in 1585 and to John Lethieullier in 1693.

Both its farm and manor house were recorded as still existing in 1630. The manor house was the birthplace of the antiquarian Smart Lethieullier, who inherited it and the estate in 1737. His heir Sir Edward Hulse disposed of most of the lands relating to Aldersbrook Manor to Sir James Tylney-Long, which reunited those lands with Wanstead Manor. (The part not sold to Tylney-Long continued to function as Aldersbrook Farm, for which a new farmhouse was constructed around 1863.) Tylney-Long demolished the manorhouse, using its site for a farmhouse which was itself demolished just after the City of London Corporation acquired much of Aldersbrook Manor for its cemetery. The manor was excavated between 1972 and 1973 and the finds are now with Newham Heritage Service, the successor to the Passmore Edwards Museum.
