= Pieter van der Plas I =

Flemish painter and tapestry designer

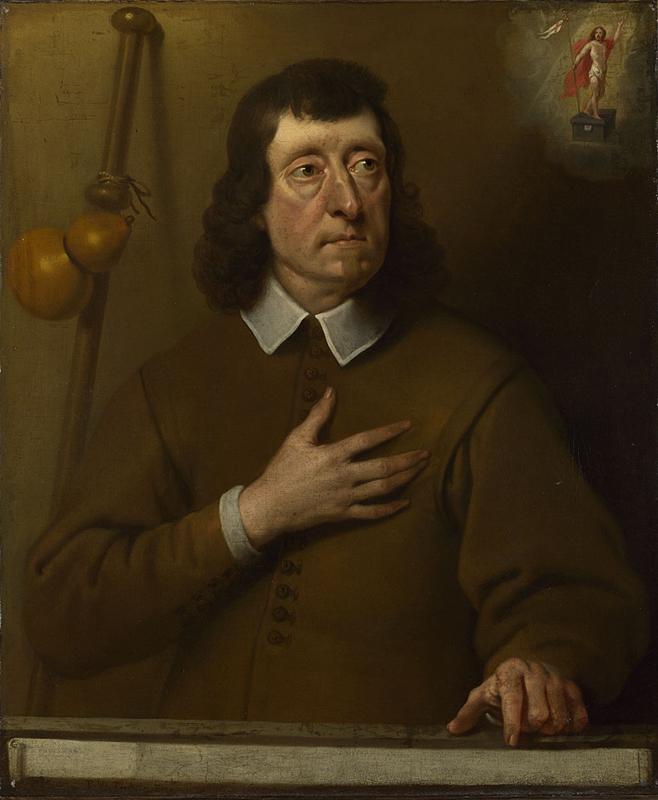
Portrait of a man

Pieter van der Plas I or Pieter van der¨Plas the Elder (c. 1595 – c. 1661) was a Flemish painter and tapestry designer active in Brussels in the first part of the 17th century. He is known for his individual and group portraits and genre paintings.

== Life ==
Little is known about the life of Pieter van der Plas. He is believed to have been born in Brussels around 1590. He was in 1610 registered as a pupil in the records of the guild of painters of Brussels. His master was the painter Ferdinand de Berndt. Between 1610 and 1650 he was active in Brussels, where he had become a master at the local guild in 1619.

He received various pupils. On 30 June 1637 Nicolaes de Smet was registered as his pupil. On 20 March 1640 Frans de Smet was registered as his pupil. On 10 May 1645 Pieter Vollesom was registered as his pupil in the records of the painters' guild of Brussels. His last known dated painting dates from 1647.

He is believed to have died in Brussels between 1650 and 1661.

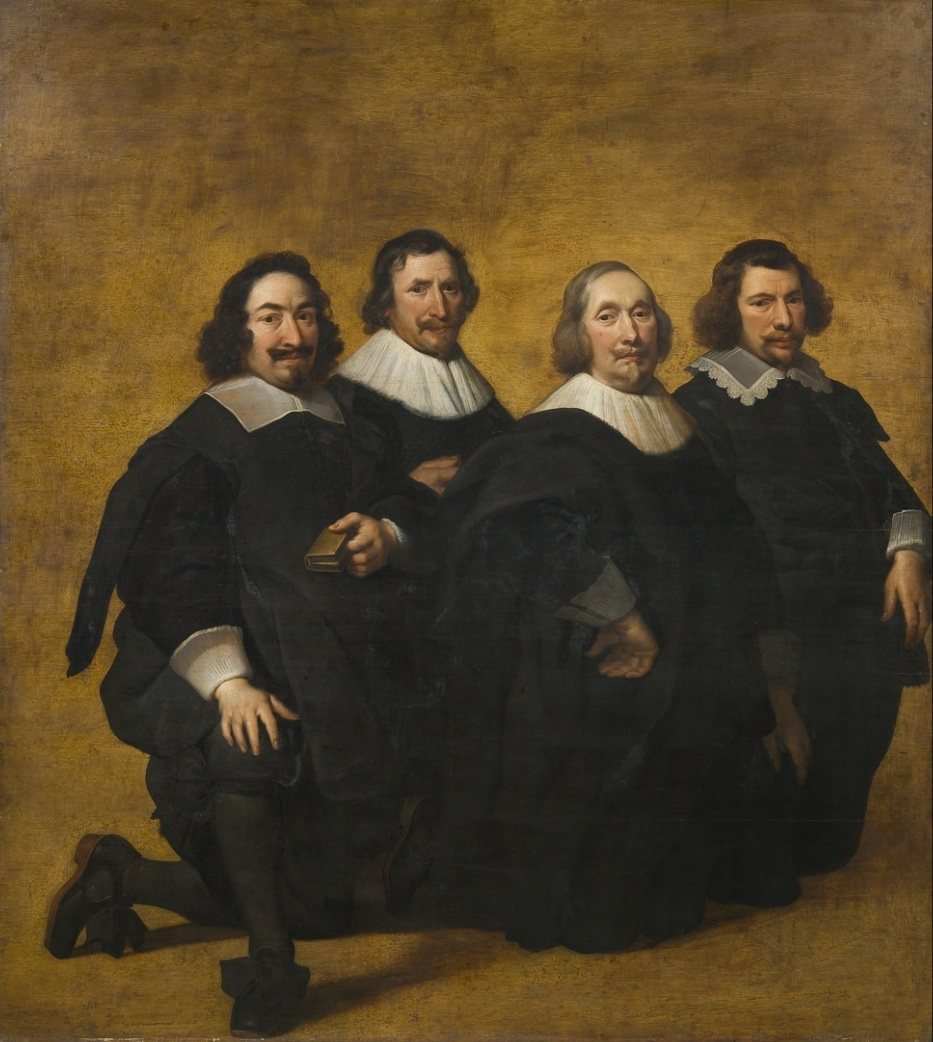
Portrait of four kneeling men

Pieter van der Plas has sometimes been confused with the artist referred to as P.V. Plas (also known as Pieter van de Plassen, P. van Dillen and the Monogrammist P.V.P.). This artist, originally from the area of Alkmaar in the Dutch Republic, was active in Brussels in the period 1630 to 1650. P.V. Plas was a still life painter who worked in the Flemish style.

== Work ==
Pieter van der Plas painted portraits of individuals as well as group portraits for the local guilds in Brussels. The style of his paintings is similar to that of his younger contemporary painters Gonzales Coques and Gillis van Tilborch.

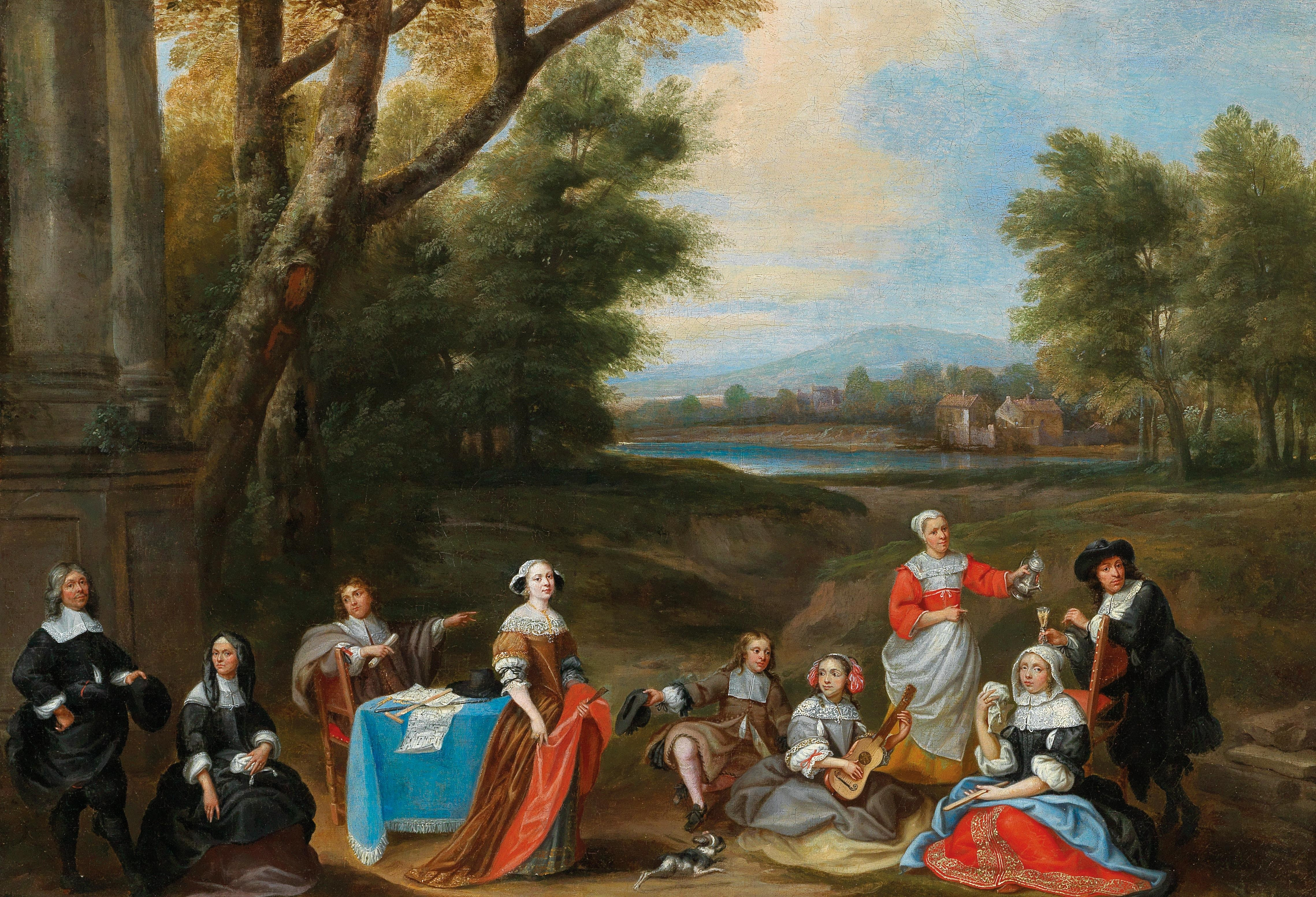
An architect showing plans to a family in aristocratic attire in a landscape

Two of his portrait paintings show donors distributing bread and clothes to orphans while being looked upon by the Virgin and Child with St. Anne. One of these is signed jointly by Pieter van der Plas and the younger Brussels portrait painter Pieter Meert (The Museum of the Centre for Social Welfare of Brussels).

In a large group portrait entitled An architect showing plans to a family in aristocratic attire in a landscape the artist animates the portrait of three generations of a family through his sense for psychology. The elder parents in black clothes are depicted on the left. Their daughter stands towards the middle, while her husband (an architect as shown by the plan on the table) and her son point towards her. At the extreme right stands the elderly couple's son. The servant filling his glass is pointing at him, as does his daughter with her small guitar. His wife sits in front of him. A small running dog at the bottom center symbolizes loyalty. In the background runs a small brook, probably the Maelbeek near Brussels.

A Portrait of a man (National Gallery, London) was formerly believed to be a portrait of John Milton. A painting depicting a Falcon hunt (the National Gallery (Norway)) shows his interest in genre painting.
