= Debora van der Plas =

Dutch-born Swedish entrepreneur (1616–1680)

Debora van der Plas (1616–1680) was a Dutch born, Swedish entrepreneur, and ship owner. She took over her husband's wrought iron works on his death, and managed it for fourteen years, selling wrought iron known as voyage iron to slave traders in England and the Netherlands.

== Biography ==
Debora van der Plas was born at Dordrecht in the Netherlands in 1616. She was the daughter of the Dutch artist Laurens van der Plas (1579–1629). He had immigrated to Sweden in 1618 and became a court painter in 1621. Around 1620, Laurens van der Plas leased the manor Axbergshammars Bruk in Närke. In 1644, she married Jan van Ruyff, a merchant and leading member of the Dutch colony in Stockholm. Van Ruyff bought the wrought iron works at Axbergshammar.

After the death of her spouse in 1658, van der Plas took control over his business and became one of Sweden's most notable ship owners and exporters of iron and copper. Van der Plas specialised in a particular type of iron, called 'voyage iron', which was bought by slave-trading companies for export to Africa. She conducted business with trading companies principally in England and the Netherlands. Among her business partners were the London based trading company Marescoe-Joyes, managed by Leonora Marescoe (1637-1715), widow of Charles Marescoe (1630-1670).

Van der Plas retired for health reasons in 1672, having run the ironworks for fourteen years, and left control of the company to her son-in-law Henrik Cletcher (1632–1695), husband of her daughter, Gertrud Maria Charlotta Cletzer (b. circa 1645). She died in 1680 in Axbergshammar.
