= Sir John Lethieullier =

British merchant and businessman (1632/3–1719)

Sir John Lethieullier (1632 or 1633 – 4 January 1719) was a British merchant and businessman descended from French Huguenot. His parents were Jan le Thieullier and Jane Delafort. He was the eldest of their three sons. His father had moved to England in 1605, settling initially in Ilford and then in Lewisham.

Lethieullier began by buying English textiles from East Anglia and the west of England with his business partner Charles Marescoe (husband to John's sister Leonora), superintending their dyeing and finishing and then exporting them to the Levant and southern Europe. He soon diversified and by 1669 was exporting tin and lead to Rotterdam and Venice as well as importing Portuguese sugar and Dutch iron. He became Sheriff of London in 1674 and was knighted around this time. Lethieullier died on 4 January 1719 and is buried in the churchyard of St Alfege Church in Greenwich.
