= St Mary's Church, Little Ilford =

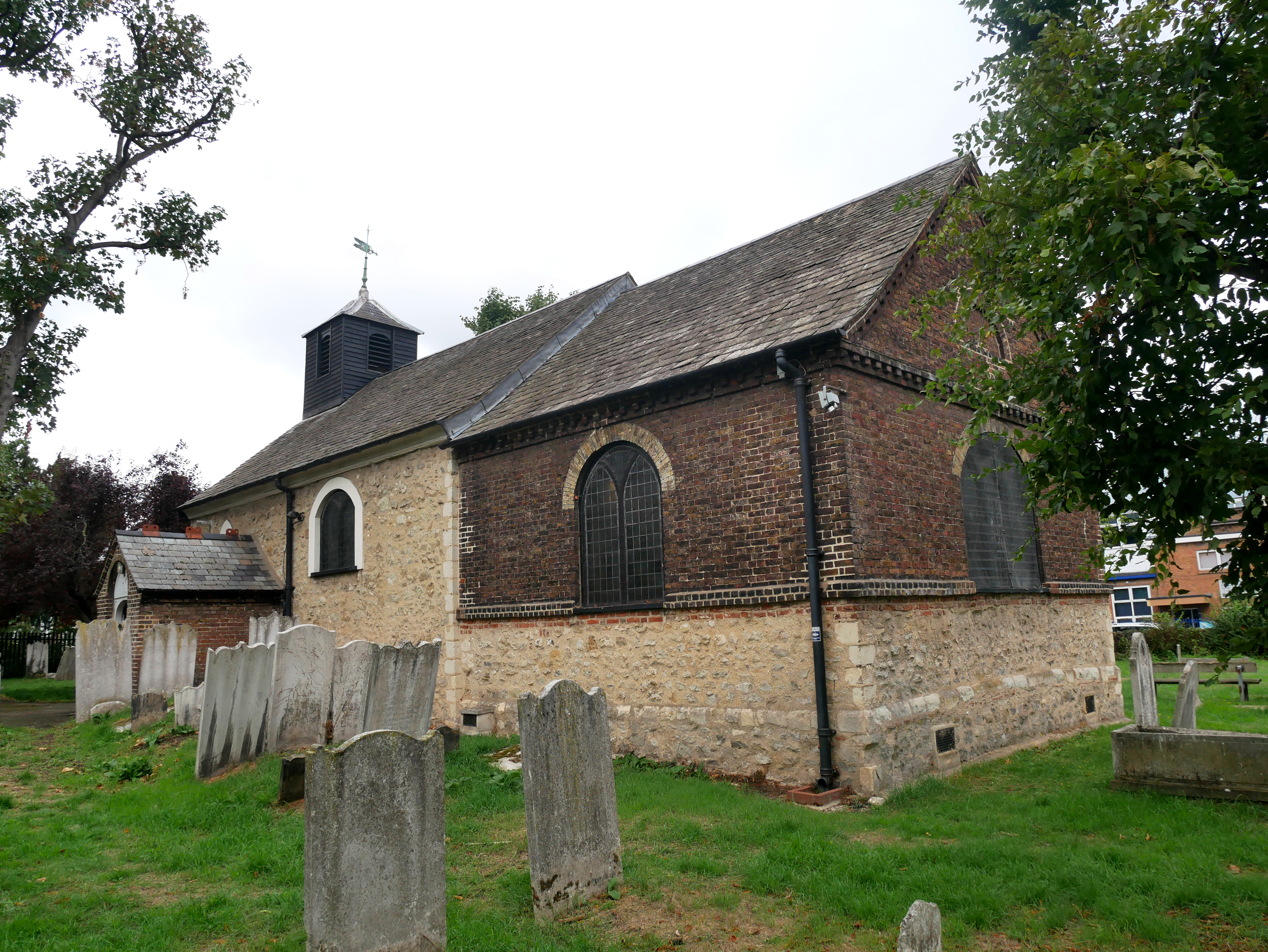
- A southeast view of Saint Mary's Church
- St Mary's Church, Little Ilford
- 51°32′54.384″N 0°3′34.1892″E
- Country: England
- Denomination: Church of England

History
- Founded: 12th century

Administration
- Diocese: Chelmsford

St Mary's Church, or Parish Church of St Mary the Virgin, is a Church of England church in Little Ilford, east London. It is situated on Church Road (B165) between St Mary's Approach (to the west), St Winefride's Avenue (to the east) and Rectory Road (to the south). It shares grounds with St Mary's Rectory, 124, Church Road, London, E12 6HA. Mainly 12th century, it had its chancel rebuilt and a south porch and family chapel to the Lethieullier family added in 1724. It remained a parish church until 1938, at which point it became a chapel of ease to St Michael's Church, Romford Road in Manor Park, London. It is listed at Grade I.
