= Little Ilford =

Coordinates: 51.5509°N 0.0549°E

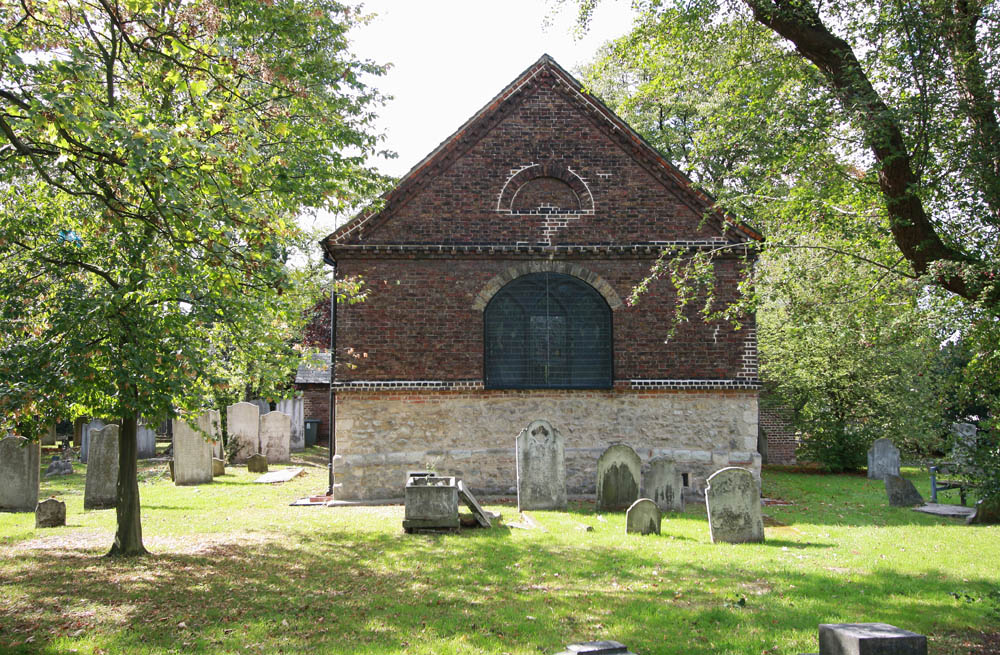
- Parish church of St Mary the Virgin

- Location within Greater London
- Population: 16,633 (2011 Census. Ward)
- OS grid reference: TQ435855
- London borough: Newham
- Ceremonial county: Greater London
- Region: London
- Country: England
- Sovereign state: United Kingdom
- Post town: LONDON
- Postcode district: E12
- Dialling code: 020
- Police: Metropolitan
- Fire: London
- Ambulance: London
- UK Parliament: East Ham
- London Assembly: City and East

Little Ilford is a district of London, England in the London Borough of Newham. It gives its name to the Little Ilford ward.

Little Ilford is now also referred to as Manor Park.

== Toponymy ==
Little Ilford and Ilford (historically known as Great Ilford) in the London Borough of Redbridge have a common etymology.

The name is first recorded in the Domesday Book of 1086 as Ilefort and applied means ford over the Hyle; an old name for the River Roding that means "trickling stream". Great and Little Ilford appear to have always been distinct areas separated by the Roding. The place names of both appear to derive from the ford (and river), rather than deriving from the subdivision of a larger Ilford area.

== History ==
=== Parish and manor ===
The Manor of Little Ilford is mentioned (as simply Ilford) in the Domesday Book of 1086, and recorded as being held by one Jocelyn the Lorimer. Domesday also records that the manor was held by two freemen prior to the Norman Conquest. Great Ilford was not mentioned at Domesday as it was part of the Manor of Barking.

Little Ilford became an ancient parish centred on St Mary's Church on Church Street, by the late 12th century; the parish organisation of England was completed at that time and sub-divisions and boundary changes were rare. Little Ilford may have been an exception to the rule in that it may have extended northward in the 16th century.

The civil parish of Little Ilford became part of the West Ham Poor Law Union in 1836. Parishes that had not adopted the Public Health Acts became part of rural sanitary authorities along the lines of the poor law unions of which they formed part. Therefore, it became part of the West Ham Rural Sanitary District. Neighbouring East Ham had adopted the Local Government Act 1858 and formed a local government district in 1878, governed by a local board of nine members that became the urban sanitary authority. In 1886 the East Ham local government district was extended to include the civil parish of Little Ilford, and the board was increased to twelve members. In 1894 the local government district became East Ham Urban District. Little Ilford was abolished as a civil parish on 1 April 1900 and absorbed into the parish of East Ham. At the 1891 census (the last before the abolition of the parish), Little Ilford had a population of 3969. East Ham went on to form a municipal borough in 1904 and became a county borough in 1915. The area remained an ecclesiastical parish until 1938.

== Geography ==
Little Ilford is divided from Ilford by the North Circular Road, the Alders Brook and the River Roding, and connected by the A118 road.

Little Ilford is sometimes referred to as being part of Manor Park due to historic links.

== Education ==
There is a large comprehensive school in the area called Little Ilford School.

== Connections ==
London bus route 147 serves the neighbourhood.

The nearest railway station is Manor Park, an Elizabeth line station in zones 3/4.
