= Rochford Hall =

Manor in Rochford, Essex, England

Coordinates: 51.58092°N 0.69858°E

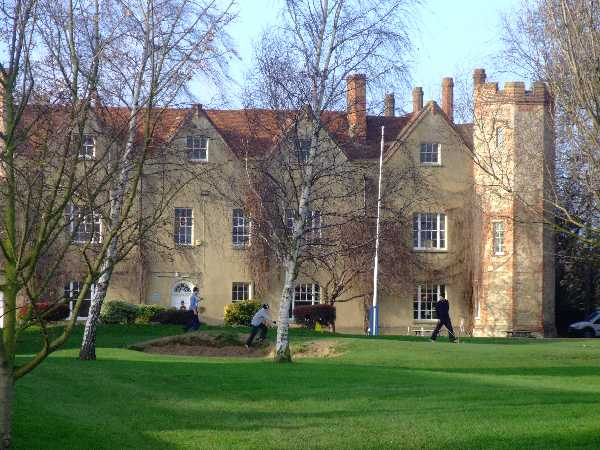
Rochford Hall.

Rochford Hall is a manor in Rochford, Essex, England. During the reign of King Henry VIII, it belonged to Thomas Boleyn, who was then Viscount Rochford, and it was the marital home of his daughter Mary Boleyn, sister of Anne Boleyn, and Mary's second husband, Sir William Stafford. It is now privately owned by Rochford Hundred Golf Club where it acts as the clubhouse and is a Grade I listed building.

== History ==
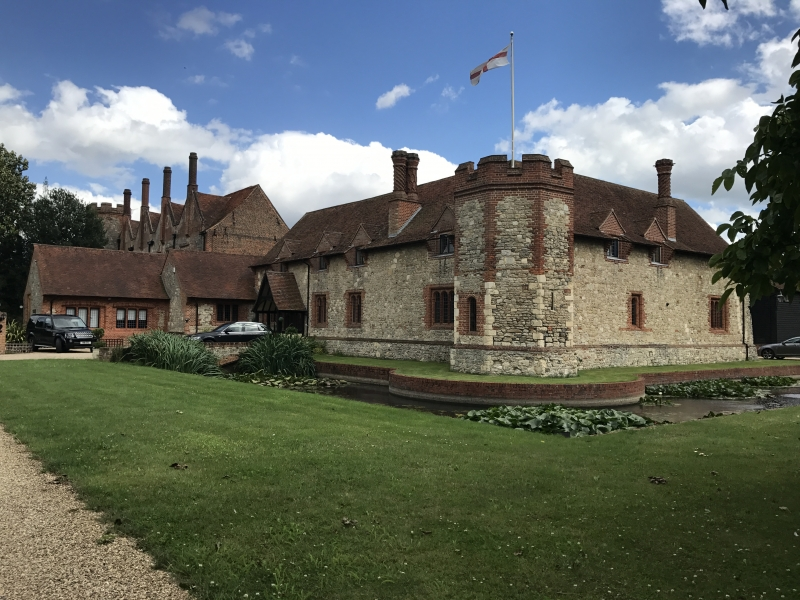
View from the moat at Rochford Hall

The manor was originally built in 1216, which is the date carved into an old joist, and some of the arched doorways are original. In its 16th century form Rochford Hall comprised a sprawling turreted manor with a moat and great hall.

Rochford Hall belonged to Sir Thomas Boleyn, father of Anne, as part of his rich inheritance from his mother Margaret Butler. Sir Thomas was created Viscount Rochford in 1525 and Earl of Wiltshire and Ormonde 1529, and his title derived from his ownership of Rochford Hall. Following the second marriage of Anne's elder sister Mary to William Stafford in 1534, Rochford Hall was given to the couple as their principal residence. In 1550 the Rochford estate was sold to Richard, Lord Rich.

By the late 17th Century Rochford Hall was owned by the Child Family of Wanstead House, Essex, later Earl Tylney. It then descended with the Wanstead Estate to James Tylney-Long, his daughter Catherine Tylney-Long and via the Long-Wellesley Family to Henry Wellesley, 1st Earl Cowley. He sold it to a local gentleman farmer in 1867.

Rochford Hall was usually let, on long leases, or used by the Steward of the Rochford or greater Essex Estates of the Tylney-Long family.

There have been many additions and alterations to the manor over the centuries, not least a catastrophic fire in 1791. The 20-foot-high (6.1 m) stained glass replica window in the main hall consists of three coats-of-arms of previous owners including the crest of Anne Boleyn.
