= Tylney-Long baronets =

Extinct baronetcy in the Baronetage of England

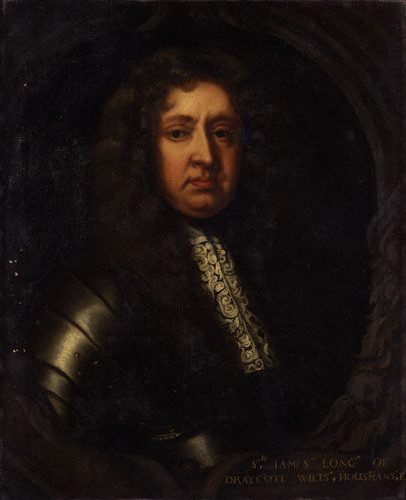
Sir James Long, 2nd Baronet

The Long (later Tylney-Long) baronetcy, of Westminster, was a title in the Baronetage of England. It was created in 1662 for Robert Long.

== History ==
The baronetcy was created for Robert Long, Member of Parliament from 1624 to 1627 and in the Short Parliament and again from 1661 to 1673 on 1 September 1662. Long never married and, lacking male descendants, was succeeded by his nephew James, the second Baronet. James was the son of Sir Walter Long. Three of Sir James's grandsons, the third, fourth and fifth Baronets, all succeeded in the title.

Sir James Long, the 5th Baronet, represented several constituencies in the House of Commons. His son, the 6th baronet, married Lady Emma, daughter of Richard Tylney, 1st Earl Tylney (see Earl Tylney). Their son, the seventh Baronet, succeeded to the substantial Tylney estates, including Wanstead, on the death of his maternal uncle in 1784 and assumed the additional surname of Tylney. His only son, also James, the eighth Baronet, died young in 1805 and the baronetcy became extinct.

Catherine Tylney-Long, daughter of the seventh Baronet and sister of the eighth and last Baronet, inherited the family estates. She married William Wellesley-Pole, later the 4th Earl of Mornington, who assumed the additional surnames of Tylney and Long. See Earl of Mornington for further history of this title.

== Long (later Tylney-Long) baronets, of Westminster (1662) ==
- Sir Robert Long, 1st Baronet (1598–1673)
- Sir James Long, 2nd Baronet (1617–1692)
- Sir Robert Long, 3rd Baronet (1673–1692)
- Sir Giles Long, 4th Baronet (1675–1698)
- Sir James Long, 5th Baronet (1682–1729)
- Sir Robert Long, 6th Baronet (1705–1767)
- Sir James Tylney-Long, 7th Baronet (1736–1794)
- Sir James Tylney-Long, 8th Baronet (1794–1805)

== Arms ==
Coat of arms of Tylney-Long of Westminster
Crest 1st, On a wreath of the colours a lion's head couped Argent, in the mouth a sinister human hand erased at the wrist Proper (Long, augmentation) ; 2nd, within a ducal coronet Or, a lion sejant Argent, charged (Long, original); 3rd, Out of a ducal coronet Or, a gryphon's head Gules, armed of the First, issuant from the leaves Argent and Azure (Tylney) Escutcheon Quarterly: 1st and 4th: Sable, semée of cross crosslets argent, a lion rampant of the Last (Long); 2nd and 3rd: Argent, a chevron between three gryphons' heads erased Gules, armed Or (Tylney).

== See also ==
- Earl Tylney
- Earl of Mornington
