= Louis Henry Scipio, Count Duroure =

Louis Henry Scipio, Count Duroure (1763–1822) was a French revolutionary and English radical.

== Background ==
Duroure was born in Marseilles on 26 February 1763. Louis Alexandre, Count Duroure, an Anglo-French soldier, claimed to be his father. Duroure also claimed that his mother was Hon. Henrietta Child, widow of Hon Josiah Child, younger brother of John Tylney, 2nd Earl Tylney, of Wanstead House, and daughter of Robert Knight, Lord Luxborough and later Earl of Catherlough. Mrs. Child had died three days after the child's birth and Duroure returned to Lord Luxborough's house in London with the child, and Mrs. Child's body in a coffin, claiming that they had been married and that the child was theirs. Lord Luxborough (who had known nothing of the marriage or of his daughter's pregnancy) took them in and presented the child to the world as the legitimate child of his daughter's marriage to Duroure.

== Upbringing ==
Duroure was bi-lingual, so it appears that he was educated both in France and England. He later claimed to have studied at Oxford. His reputed grandfather, Lord Catherlough, died in 1772, leaving his property to his illegitimate children. Duroure was to have the income on £3000 at his majority. When his half-brother, Josiah Child, died in 1775, Duroure's guardians claimed Mrs. Child's fortune for him. They seem to have been unsuccessful in establishing their claim, for Lord Bolingbroke (the next heir) took possession of the two houses in Park Lane and Albemarle Street that had belonged to Mrs Child. He may have spent some time in Martinique, for it is said that he accompanied Marie Rose Tascher de La Pagerie on her voyage to France in 1779. In 1780, Duroure's guardians purchased a commission for him in the Royal Horseguards Blue.

== Arrest and English Imprisonment ==
As a lieutenant in the Horseguards, Duroure was said to have caused "much notice about town." Then, in 1784, he attempted to elope to France with the wife of a lawyer of his acquaintance. They were unable to gain a passage and were finally tracked down by the lady's husband to a bagnio in Leicester Fields. A pistol was fired at the lawyer as he tried to gain admittance and Duroure was brought to trial at the Old Bailey. His lawyer Thomas Erskine (later Lord Chancellor) got him off on a technicality but the next day he was arrested for debt. He remained in Newgate Gaol until September 1789.

== Revolutionary career ==
The day after his release, Duroure gained access to his mother's Park Lane house — which Lord Bolingbroke had already sold to a Mr. Jones — and lived there for the next two years. When his claim was finally brought before Lord Chief Justice Kenyon at the Surrey Assizes in June 1791, it was ruled that he was barred from inheriting his mother's property because he had been born abroad of a foreign father. Despite the ruling, he seems to have remained well off. Soon after this, he left for Paris where he was active in the section Faubourg Montmartre. At the end of October 1792, as Scipion Duroure, he was elected to represent his section on the General Council of the Paris Commune, where he had responsibility for the royal family in the Temple Prison. He was a witness to the last testament of Louis XVI. He was elected a Vice President of the Commune and in February 1793 was further elected First Commissioner of Finance. At the end of May 1793, he was one of the members of the Revolutionary Council that made its headquarters in the Archbishop's Palace and demanded the arrest of the Girondin leaders in the convention. He was appointed to interrogate Roland, but Roland managed to escape. He was a close colleague and friend of Rene Hebert — standing sponsor at the lay baptism of Hebert's daughter — which made him vulnerable when Hebert and Robespierre fell out. Fabre d’Eglantine’s revelation of a ‘foreign plot’ in October 1793 was aimed at men liked Duroure. In early March 1794 he and his colleagues from the Section Mont-Marat (so renamed after Marat's murder) marched on the convention to demand food for the people of Paris, but he found himself denounced, arrested and sent to the Saint-Lazare prison with the other Hébertists. It is not clear how he escaped execution. In September 1794, after the end of the Terror, he was released.

== Last Years of the Revolution ==
Duroure seems to have returned to England for a brief while, though d'Amat says that he was serving as a town councillor in Avignon in 1795–6. During the Directory's attack on royalists and Jacobins in September 1797, he was again arrested. After his release, he continued to involve himself with revolutionary politics. During the brief Jacobin revival of the summer of 1799, he was a member of the Réunion d'amis de l'égalité et de la liberté, which had its headquarters in the Salle du Manège of the Tuileries, and was thus known as the Club du Manège. However, with Bonaparte's coup d'etat of December 1799, Duroure was among those proscribed as a "dangerous agitator" and condemned to deportation to French Guiana. There is no record of his arrest. He seems to have fled to England, where he spent the rest of his life.

== Later career ==
By now Duroure seems to have lost much of his fortune. He settled in London and was linked to the world of radical publishing through Sir Richard Phillips. He was an admirer of Cobbett's Grammar of the English Language, which he translated into French, though Cobbett believed he had changed too much of it. He also translated Phillips' work on the English jury system as Des pouvoirs et des obligations des jurys. According to Francois-Xavier de Feller in his Biographie Universelle, Duroure was also working on an edition of the philosophical works of his great uncle, the 1st Lord Bolingbroke, and on the family letters of his grandmother, Lady Luxborough, but nothing appeared. He died in Arundel Street, London on 24 September 1822, leaving an illegitimate son, Scipio Urbain Otanes Grimoard de Beauvoir Duroure, who died unmarried in August 1823, aged 34. Duroure was buried with his reputed mother (Mrs Child, otherwise Countess Duroure) at Ullenhall in Warwickshire after a funeral which was "ridiculously grand, the hearse all covered with coats-of-arms, not much to the satisfaction of the family, who doubted his really being the Countess' son" His funerary hatchment still hangs in Wootton Wawen church.

== In fiction ==
In 2013, Bernadette Ramillier published her historical novel La Vie Aventureuse de Scipion du Roure, 1759-1822. Apart from taking his name and an approximation of his dates, it is only loosely based on Du Roure's life. He also features in another historical novel by Catherine Hermary-Vieille, Merveilleuses (2012) as the lover of Rose de la Pagerie, later the Empress Josephine. "Une immediate attirance avait rapproché les deux jeunes gens, ils avaient des souvenuirs communs, un caractère insouciant, de l’opportunisme, un temperament sensuel". She picks up the tradition that Duroure spent some of his youth in the West Indies and was one of Josephine's many lovers.
