= Josiah Child =

English merchant and politician

Sir Josiah Child Bt
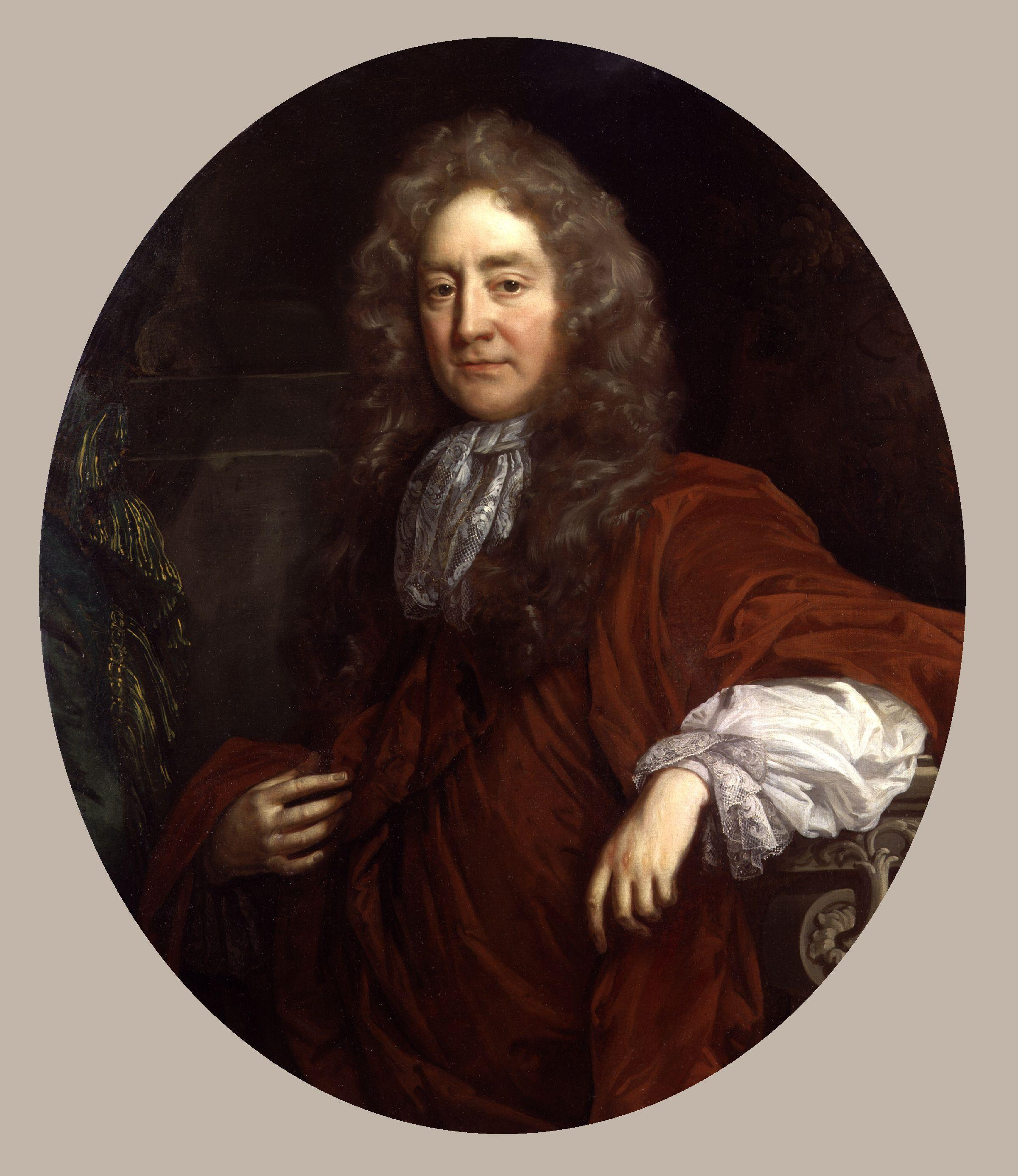
- Portrait, oil on canvas attributed to John Riley (1646–1691), National Gallery Collections.

Sir Josiah Child, 1st Baronet, MP (c. 1630/31 – 22 June 1699) was an English economist, merchant and politician. He was an economist proponent of mercantilism and governor of the East India Company. He led the company in the Anglo-Mughal War.

== Early life ==
Child was born around 1630–31 and christened in St Bartholomew-by-the-Exchange on 27 February 1630–31, the second son of Richard Child, a merchant of Fleet Street (buried 1639 at Hackney), and Elizabeth Roycroft of Weston Wick, Shropshire. After serving his apprenticeship in the family business, after much struggle, he succeeded. At about age 25, he started on his own account at Portsmouth as victualler to the Navy under the Commonwealth; he is also described as "agent to the Navy Treasurer".

He amassed a comfortable fortune, and became a considerable stock-holder in the East India Company. In 1659, he was elected Member of Parliament for Petersfield in the Third Protectorate Parliament. He was elected MP for Dartmouth in 1673 in a by-election to the Cavalier Parliament.

== Purchase of Wanstead Manor ==
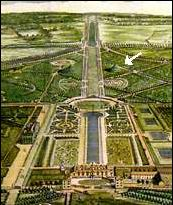
Wanstead Hall, residence of Sir Josiah Child from 1673, as it appeared until 1715

Child purchased Wanstead Manor in Essex in 1673 from the executors of Sir Robert Brooke and spent much money on laying out the grounds of the manor house, Wanstead Hall. The diarist John Evelyn made the following characteristically waspish entry for 16 March 1683

"I went to see Sir Josiah Child's prodigious cost in planting of walnut trees about his seat and making fishponds many miles in circuit in Epping Forest in a barren spot as commonly these overgrown and suddenly monied men for the most part seat themselves. He from an ordinary merchant's apprentice & management of the East India Company's common stock being arrived to an estate ('tis said) of £200,000 and lately married his daughter to the eldest son of the Duke of Beaufort, late Marquis of Worcester, with £30,000 (some versions £50,000) portion at present, & various expectations. This merchant most sordidly avaricious etc."

According to Daniel Defoe, Child "added innumerable rows of trees, avenues and vistas to the house, all leading up to the place where the old house stood, as to a centre".

In 1678, Child was created Baronet Child of Wanstead in the County of Essex. In 1685 he was elected MP for Ludlow. He served as High Sheriff of Essex in 1689.

== Career with the East India Company ==
Child's advocacy, both by speech and by pen (under the pseudonym Philopatris), of the East India Company's claims to political power, as well as to its right of restricting competition to its trade, brought him to the notice of the shareholders. He was appointed a Director in 1677, rising to Deputy-Governor and finally became Governor of the East India Company in 1681. In this latter capacity, he directed the company's policy as if it were his own private business.

He and Sir John Child, president of Surat and governor of Bombay (no relation according to the Oxford Dictionary of National Biography, arms: "Vert, 2 bars engrailled between 3 leopards' faces or") are sometimes credited with the change from unarmed to armed traffic, but the actual renunciation of the Roe doctrine of unarmed traffic by the company was resolved upon in January 1686, under Governor Sir Joseph Ash, when Child was temporarily out of office.

== War with Mughal India ==
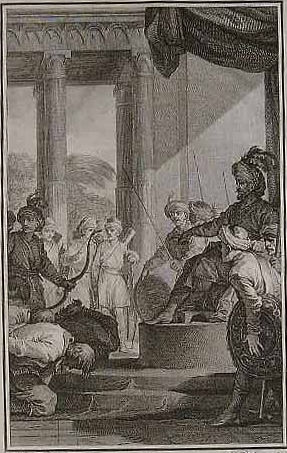
Sir John Child apologising to Emperor Aurangzeb.

Child lost the war with Aurangzeb, 6th Mughal Emperor of India, which took place between 1688 and 1690. Aurangzeb, however, did not take any punitive action against the company and restored its trading privileges. "For a massive indemnity and promises of better conduct in the future, he Aurangzeb graciously agreed to the restoration of their East India Company's trading privileges and the withdrawal of his troops".

== Economic philosophy ==
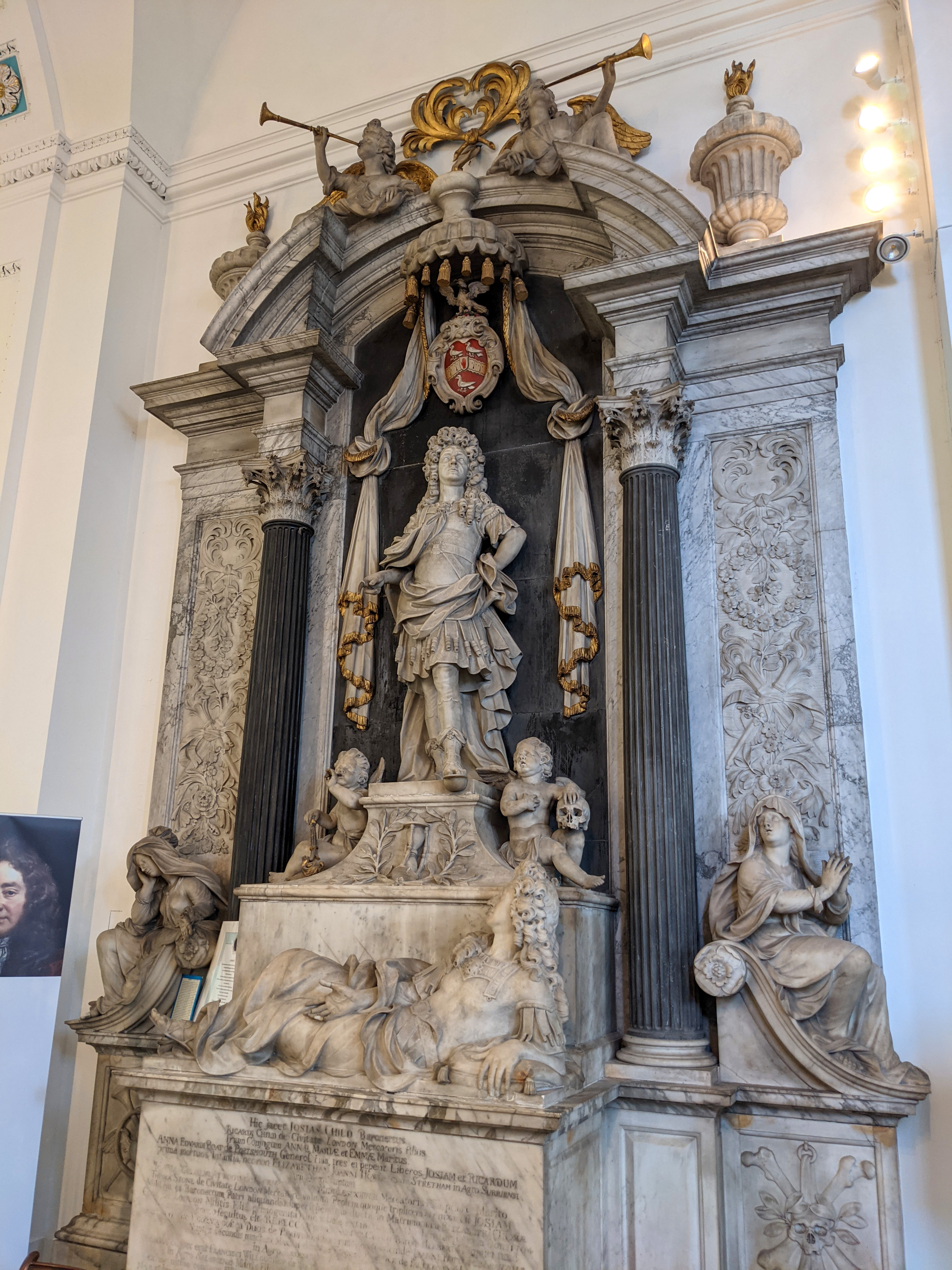
Funerary monument of Child in St Mary the Virgin Church, Wanstead.

Child contributed to the literature of economics, especially Brief Observations concerning Trade and the Interest of Money (1668), and A New Discourse of Trade (1668 and 1690). He was a moderate in the days of the mercantile system and has sometimes been regarded as a sort of pioneer in developing the free-trade doctrines of the 18th century. Though Child considered himself a proponent of the competitive market, he simultaneously argued for a government-controlled interest rate and restricted trade among the colonies, benefiting England.

He made various proposals for improving English trade by following the Dutch example. He advocated a low rate of interest as the causa causans of all the other causes of the riches of the Dutch people. This low rate of interest he thought should be created and maintained by public authority. Child, whilst adhering to the doctrine of the balance of trade, observed that a people cannot always sell to foreigners without ever buying from them, and denied that the export of the precious metals was necessarily detrimental.

Like other writers in what is commonly called the mercantilist period or tradition, he viewed a numerous population as an asset to a country. He became prominent with a new scheme for the relief and employment of the poor. He also advocated the reservation by the mother country of the sole right of trade with her colonies.

In Sir Josiah Child, Merchant Economist (1959), William Letwin considers that Child's economic thought was of little theoretical importance but notes that he was "the most widely-read of seventeenth-century economic writers".

== Family ==
Child married firstly, Hannah Boate, daughter of Edward Boate, on 26 December 1654 at Portsmouth, Hampshire. He had one surviving child, Elizabeth. Two other children died young. Elizabeth married John Howland of Streatham, and their daughter Elizabeth married the Duke of Bedford.

Child married secondly, c. 14 June 1663, Mary Atwood, daughter of William Atwood. The issues from this marriage are Rebecca (c. 1666 – 17 Jul 1712) who married firstly Charles Somerset, Marquess of Worcester and secondly John, Lord Granville); Mary who married Edward Bullock of Faulkbourne and died c. 1748; and his heir Josiah Child, 2nd Baronet (c.1668-20 Jan 1704).

Child married thirdly, c. 8 August 1676, Emma Willoughby (Willughby), widow of Francis Willughby of Wollaton Hall and daughter of Sir Henry Barnard. They had one child, a son, Richard Child (5 Feb 1680 – March 1750), who was created Viscount Castlemaine in 1718 and Earl Tylney in 1731.

Child died on 22 June 1699 and was buried at Wanstead, East London. His will dated 22 February 1696, was proved on 6 July 1699.

== Heraldry ==
The Oxford Dictionary of National Biography states positively that he was not related to the Child & Co bankers of Osterley Park. The latter have very humble origins, at Heddington, in Wiltshire. It is not known why they used the same heraldry - Burke's Armorials 1884, for example, giving both families the same armorials: "Gules, a chevron ermine between 3 eagles close argent". (See Villiers family, Earls of Jersey, into which family the banking Child family married.) The earliest bearer of these Child arms was William Childe, sheriff of Worcestershire in 1585. Burke's Armorials, 1884, p. 193. Child & Childe; p. 1057 Villiers, Earls of Jersey.

Parliament of England
Preceded by Not represented in Second Protectorate Parliament	Member of Parliament for Petersfield; 1659; With: Sir Henry Norton, 2nd Baronet	Succeeded by Not represented in Restored Rump
Preceded by William Harbord; William Gould	Member of Parliament for Dartford; 1673–1679; With: William Harbord	Succeeded by Sir Nathaniel Herne; John Upton
Preceded by Sir Edward Herbert; William Charlton	Member of Parliament for Ludlow; 1685–1689; With: Sir Edward Herbert 1685; Sir Edward Lutwyche 1685–1689	Succeeded by Francis Herbert; Charles Baldwyn
Baronetage of England
New creation	Baronet (of Wanstead); 1678–1699	Succeeded by Josiah Child
