= Sir Robert Long, 6th Baronet =

English politician (1705–1767)

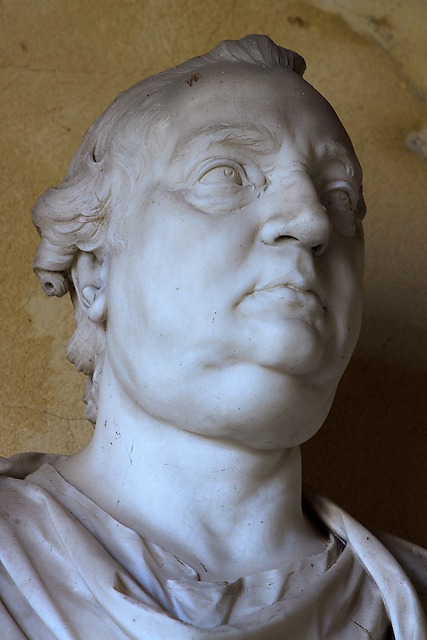
Monument in the church of St James, Draycot Cerne, sculpture by Joseph Wilton

Sir Robert Long, 6th Baronet (1705 – 10 February 1767), was an English politician.

The only surviving son of Sir James Long, 5th Baronet and his wife Henrietta Greville, Long was baptised on 8 November 1705 at St Martin in the Fields, Westminster, London. Educated at Balliol College, Oxford, he succeeded his father as 6th Baronet on 16 March 1729, and inherited the family estates, including the manors of Draycot and Athelhampton.

He was elected member of parliament for the rotten borough of Wootton Bassett in 1734, and for Wiltshire in 1741.

He married on 29 May 1735 at Woodford, Essex, Emma Child, the daughter of Richard Tylney, 1st Earl Tylney, of Wanstead (said to be possessed of 'almost revolting wealth'), and his wife Dorothy Glynn.

Sir Robert and Emma had two daughters and four sons including:

- Sir James Tylney-Long, 7th Baronet, inherited Wanstead from his uncle, John Tylney, 2nd Earl Tylney
- Charles Long, whose granddaughter Emma married George Julius Poulett Scrope

Sir Robert Long died on 10 February 1767 and was buried at Draycot. His wife died on 8 March 1758.

== Sources ==
- The Lion and the Rose – Ethel M. Richardson, 1922

Parliament of Great Britain
Preceded by John St John; John Crosse	Member of Parliament for Wootton Bassett; 1734–1741; Served alongside: Nicholas Robinson	Succeeded by Robert Neale; John Harvey-Thursby
Preceded by John Ivory-Talbot; John Howe	Member of Parliament for Wiltshire; 1741–1767; Served alongside: Edward Popham	Succeeded by Edward Popham; Thomas Goddard
Baronetage of England
Preceded by James Long	Baronet of Westminster; 1729–1767	Succeeded by James Tylney-Long
