= Wanstead Hall =

Former manor house in England

Coordinates: 51.5678°N 0.0422°E

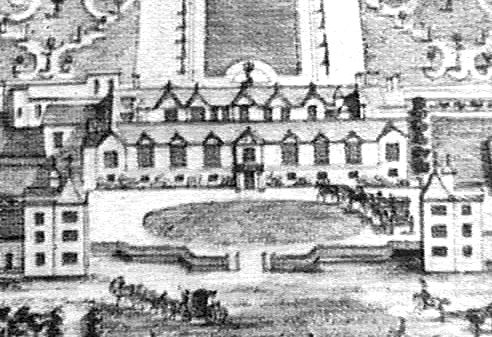
Wanstead House or Wanstead Hall pre 1715, the residence of Sir Josiah Child, 1st Baronet. Detail of the Knyffs' drawing.

Wanstead Hall was the manor house for the Manor of Wanstead, now in the London Borough of Redbridge but historically in the county of Essex. It was later demolished to make way for the construction of Wanstead House.

== History ==
=== Tudor ===
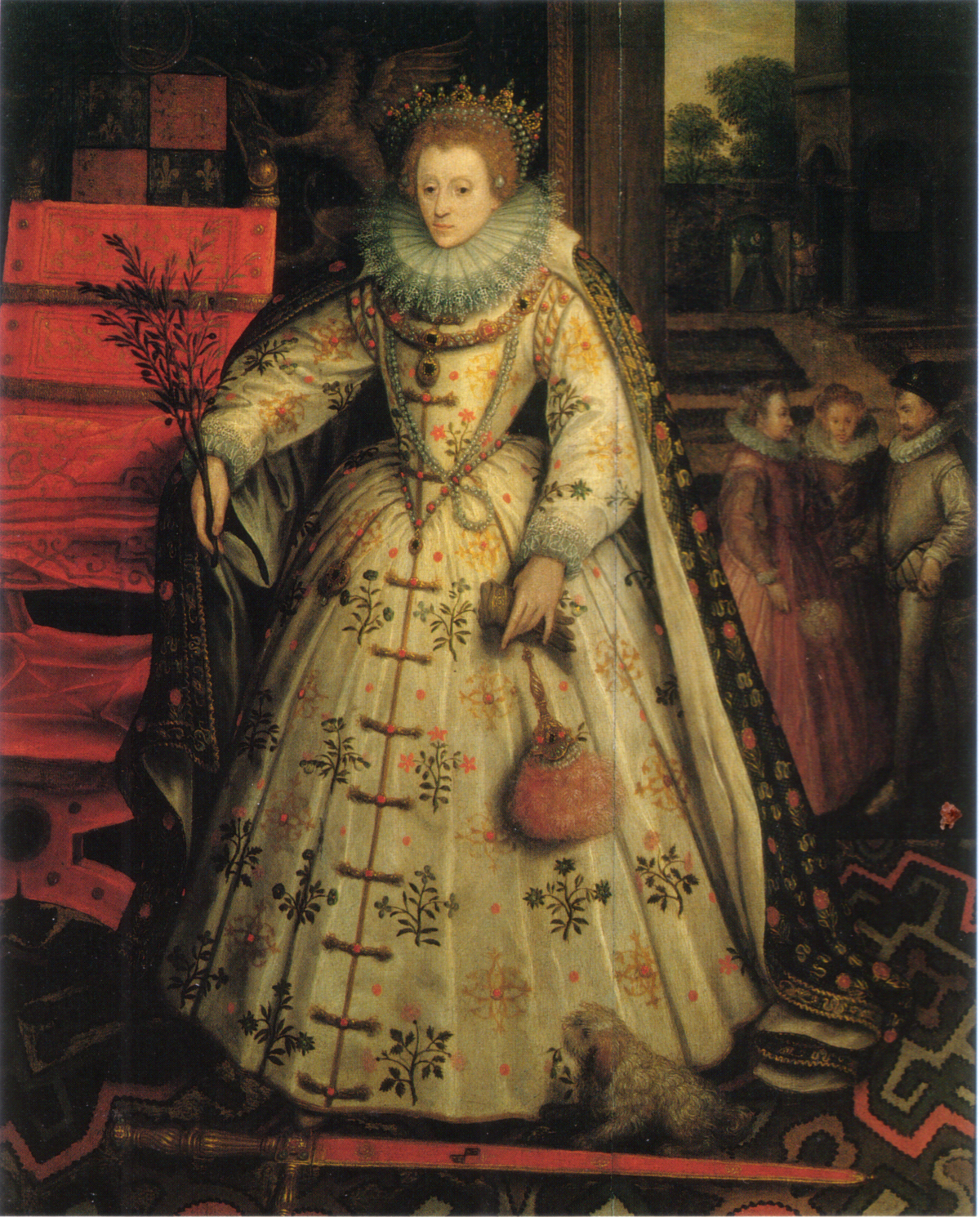
The Welbeck portrait of Elizabeth I by Gheeraerts, c. 1580, said to show Wanstead Hall in the background.

It was probably quite a small building until the 14th century, but by 1499 it was large enough to serve as a royal hunting-lodge, when it was acquired by King Henry VII, one of whose favourite resorts it was to become. Henry had developed a taste for privacy towards the end of his reign, and acquired Wanstead as a maison de retraite in the vicinity of Greenwich Palace, laying out considerable sums on it. It was valued by him especially for its park, bringing the King much needed seclusion.

Henry VII used Wanstead as a location for receiving payments from what the Tudor historian David Starkey calls his "slush fund" of extra-parliamentary taxation and fines, away from the eyes of the magnates in the formal royal palaces. The young future Henry VIII lived for a while at Wanstead and at the other maison de retraite of Hanworth Manor in enforced proximity to his father Henry VII during the last years of his reign. Both kings hunted within the manor.

It was during Henry VIII's reign (1509–1547) that Wanstead Park was enclosed, shortly before 1512, which probably involved the clearance of some wooded areas. At about this time neighbouring Aldersbrook became a separate manor. Wanstead remained a royal manor for a number of years, its "keeper" being an office awarded to favoured royal courtiers, one after another. Hugh Denys, Groom of the Stool to Henry VII, was its keeper until 1511, being one of the King's key financial officers who often received the "slush fund" monies there on the King's behalf. In 1511, the keepership passed to Charles Brandon, later Duke of Suffolk and from 1515 Henry's brother-in-law via marriage to his sister Mary Tudor.

John Heron, another former financial officer within the Privy chamber, was keeper of the park until his death in 1521. Heron also held lands in Aldersbrook and it is said that he brought heron birds to the area, as an amusing mark of his presence. One of the lakes was historically known as "Herony (sic) Lake". (A heronry, i.e. colony of heron birds, is shown on Lincoln Island on a 1919 OS map of Wanstead Park, unless this is merely a confusion over the nomenclature of the lakes.) Lord Richard Rich, High Chancellor of England, was keeper of the park in 1543, and in 1549 Edward VI granted him the lordship of the manor of Wanstead, complete with the park. In 1577 Rich's son Robert sold it to Robert Dudley, 1st Earl of Leicester, who purchased the nearby manor of Stonhall in Ilford at the same time. Thereafter a succession of owners kept the manor of Wanstead combined with Stonehall.

Mary I came to Wanstead in August 1553, after overcoming the supporters of Lady Jane Grey, and was met by her sister Elizabeth.

=== Jacobean Wanstead ===
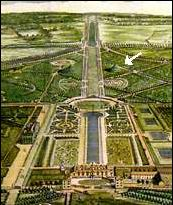
The appearance of the gardens in an image by Jan Kip and Leonard Knyff, c. 1708.

King James I hunted at Wanstead on 24 September 1609 and gave an audience to the Venetian ambassador Marc' Antonio Correr, who he described as a Pantalone. He stayed again in September 1614 giving an audience to another Venetian diplomat Antonio Foscarini. In 1624, James rode at Wanstead on his birthday, 19 June, with Mary Villiers, Countess of Buckingham and Susan Feilding, Countess of Denbigh.

In 1619 Sir Henry Mildmay was in possession, but forfeited the manor to the Crown at the end of the Civil War, in which he had fought for Parliament. Charles II granted the estate to his brother, James, Duke of York, but it was restored in about 1662 to Sir Robert Brooke, Mildmay's son in law. In 1673-4 the manor was purchased by Josiah Child, Governor of the East India Company. He spent much time and money in developing the estate according to the fashion of the time and was created 1st Baronet Child of Wanstead in 1678.

When John Evelyn, the diarist, visited Wanstead in March 1683 he wrote: "I went to see Sir Josiah Child's prodigious cost in planting walnut trees about his seate, and making fish ponds many miles in circuit in Epping Forest, in a barren place." The ponds mentioned by Evelyn still exist, though somewhat altered, forming a chain of ponds descending from the Shoulder of Mutton Pond, through Heronry Pond, Perch Pond, the Dell and into the Ornamental Waters.

Child died in 1699, and was succeeded by his son – also Sir Josiah Child – who leased Wanstead and Stonehall to his half-brother, Richard Child. On Sir Josiah II's death in 1704, Richard Child became 3rd Baronet, having succeeded to his title and estates – eleven years later he commissioned the design for the Hall's replacement, Wanstead House.

== Bibliography ==
- Cornish, Alan (1982). Wanstead Park – A Chronicle.
- Cornish, Alan (2006). Wanstead Park – A Chronicle. (revised and updated). Wanstead Parklands Community Project.
- Evelyn, John (1664). Sylva, or A Discourse of Forest-Trees and the Propagation of Timber.
- Lysons, Daniel (1796). The Environs of London. Vol. 4. pp. 231–244.
- Ramsey, Winston; Fowkes, Reginald (1986). Epping Forest: Then and Now. Battle of Britain Prints International Limited.
- Starkey, David (2008). Henry: Virtuous Prince. London.

== Sources ==
- "Wanstead House and the Parklands - a History".
