= Robert Brooke (died 1669) =

English landowner, magistrate, commissioner, military officer, knight and MP

Sir Robert Brooke (1637 – 5 June 1669) was an English landowner, magistrate, commissioner, military officer, knight and MP who sat in the House of Commons from 1660 to 1669. Dying at the age of 32, his promise was cut short, and the core of his estates in East Suffolk passed by marriage into the Blois family.

== Life ==
Brooke was the second surviving son of Sir Robert Brooke of Cockfield Hall, Yoxford and his wife Dame Elizabeth Brooke, daughter of Thomas Colepeper of Great Wigsell, East Sussex. His mother was the only full sister of John Colepeper, 1st Baron Colepeper of Thoresway (1600-1660), a prominent royalist politician and adviser to Charles I and to Charles II during his exile.

Robert was educated privately under Daniel Milles. Following the death of his father in 1646, the Yoxford estate remained under the oversight of his mother Dame Elizabeth; his elder brother, John Brooke Esq (born c. 1626), married Jane Barnardiston, upon whom the Blythburgh estate was settled as a jointure, and was seated at Westwood Lodge, the house associated with the principal manor of Blythburgh. John, who continued his father's unpopular policies towards the townsfolk of Walberswick, died suddenly and unexpectedly in October 1652 without a male heir, making his widow Joan his sole legatee and administratrix. Martha Brooke (a sister of John and Robert), married (Sir) William Blois, the younger (died 1676), and had four sons and three daughters by him, but she died in 1657 aged about 29. William Blois then in 1659 remarried to Jane Brooke, widow of John Brooke.

Robert the second son, born c. 1637, was only 15 at the death of his brother. On 26 April 1659 he married Anne Margarett Mildmay, daughter of Sir Henry Mildmay of Wanstead, Essex, who was Master of the Jewel Office from 1620 to 1649. In that year Robert became JP for Suffolk and a commissioner for the militia. In April 1660, he was elected Member of Parliament for Aldeburgh in the Convention Parliament. He also became lieutenant colonel of the Suffolk Militia in April 1660. He was knighted on 9 June 1660 for his services to the Restoration of the Monarchy. In July 1660 he received a commission of oyer and terminer for Middlesex, and in August 1660 had a commission for assessment in Suffolk.

Brooke was re-elected MP for Aldeburgh in 1661 for the Cavalier Parliament where he was very active. In 1661 he became commissioner for assessment for Aldeburgh and in 1662 became a JP for Essex and one of the Six Clerks in Chancery. He received a commission for assessment for Essex in 1663. He served as Lieutenant-Colonel of Sir John Rous's regiment of Suffolk Militia. During the Second Anglo-Dutch War in 1667 he was in command of four companies of the regiment and two troops of horse defending Aldeburgh when the Dutch fleet appeared off the town on 3 July, the day after the Battle of Landguard Fort; however, the Dutch did not attempt another landing. After the war he was appointed chairman of the inquiry into the failures, and presented four reports. Samuel Pepys wrote of him extensively in his diary considering him too young for the chair, "and yet he seems to speak very well".

== Legacy ==
By his will, written in 1660, Sir Robert left Cockfield Hall and the manors of Yoxford, Cockfield and Marinels to his mother Elizabeth and her heirs absolutely. He entailed his unbequeathed real estate through William Blois's sons Robert, John and Charles Blois, in turn. His executors were Dame Margaret Hungerford (his wife's aunt, sister to Dame Anne Mildmay), Dame Elizabeth Brooke (his mother), Anne Margarett Brooke (his wife) and William Blois, Esq. (his brother-in-law).

Dame Anne Margarett, however, died on 7 January 1666/67, leaving him a daughter. By his codicil of 1667, his manor, messuage, park and rectory advowson of Wanstead were left to his cousin german John Brooke (of Ipswich). Sir Robert went to France in 1669 and was drowned while bathing in the River Rhône at Avignon in June. William Blois alone swore to administer his estate at Probate in December 1669.

William Blois succeeded to his own father Sir William the elder, compiler of the "Blois MSS", in 1673, and becoming himself Sir William, died only two years later.

All his elder sons having died, his surviving son Charles (in his father's place) took on the administration of his uncle Sir Robert Brooke's will (Dame Elizabeth Brooke renouncing and the others all being deceased), and in 1683 had control of his father's estate, his stepmother Dame Jane Blois alias Brooke by then having died, and Dame Elizabeth Brooke dying in that year. He was created 1st Baronet in 1686. Therefore, when his aunt Mary Brooke died in 1693 it was as Sir Charles Blois, 1st Baronet that he, and subsequently his heirs, became masters of Cockfield Hall at Yoxford. Sir Robert's estate at Wanstead was sold later to Sir Josiah Child, 1st Baronet.
