= Viscount Castlemaine =

Title in the Peerage of Ireland

Viscount Castlemaine is a title that has been created three times in the Peerage of Ireland. The first creation came in 1628. For more information on this creation, see Viscount Monson of Castlemaine. The second creation came in 1718. For more information on this creation, see Earl Tylney. The third creation came in 1822. for more information on this creation, see Baron Castlemaine.

== Viscounts Castlemaine (1718 creation) ==
- see Earl Tylney

== Viscounts Castlemaine (1822 creation) ==
- see Baron Castlemaine

== See also ==
- Earl of Castlemaine
