= Earl Tylney =

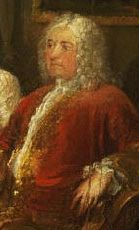
Richard Child when Viscount Castlemain, circa 1728. Detail from The Assembly at Wanstead, by Hogarth.

Earl Tylney, of Castlemaine in the County of Kerry, was a title in the Peerage of Ireland. It was created on 11 June 1731 for Richard Child, 1st Viscount Castlemaine. The Child family descended from the merchant, economist and colonial administrator Josiah Child, who on 16 July 1678 was created a baronet, of Wanstead in the County of Essex, in the Baronetage of England. The first Baronet was succeeded by his son from his second marriage, Sir Josiah Child, 2nd Baronet.

The second baronet died young and childless, though engaged to be married, in 1704, having briefly represented Wareham in the House of Commons from 1702, and was succeeded by his half-brother, Sir Richard Child, 3rd Baronet, the second son from the third marriage of the first Baronet, his elder brother Bernard, also from the third marriage, having predeceased his father in 1698. In 1703, the future third Baronet, had married Dorothy, daughter of John Glynne, younger son of Sir John Glynne, Lord Chief Justice, by Dorothy, daughter of Francis Tylney, of Tylney Hall, Hampshire. On 24 April 1718, he was raised to the Peerage of Ireland as Baron Newtown, in the County of Donegal, and Viscount Castlemaine, in the County of Kerry. In 1731, he was created Earl Tylney, of Castlemaine in the County of Kerry, also in the Peerage of Ireland. In 1733, Lord Tylney assumed by Act of Parliament for himself and his heirs in the peerage the surname of Tylney in lieu of Child. His eldest son Richard Tylney, therefore known as Richard Child until 1733, styled Viscount Castlemaine from 1731 until his death in 1734 predeceased his father without issue, and the Earl was thus succeeded by his second son, John, 2nd Earl Tylney. He was a Fellow of the Royal Society. Lord Tylney died unmarried and therefore without legal issue in 1784, upon which all the titles became extinct.

Lady Emma, daughter of the first Earl, married Sir Robert Long, 6th Baronet. Their son James succeeded to the estates of his uncle the second Earl on his death, upon which he assumed the additional surname of Tylney. For more information on this title, see Tylney-Long baronets.

== Child baronets, of Wanstead (1678) ==
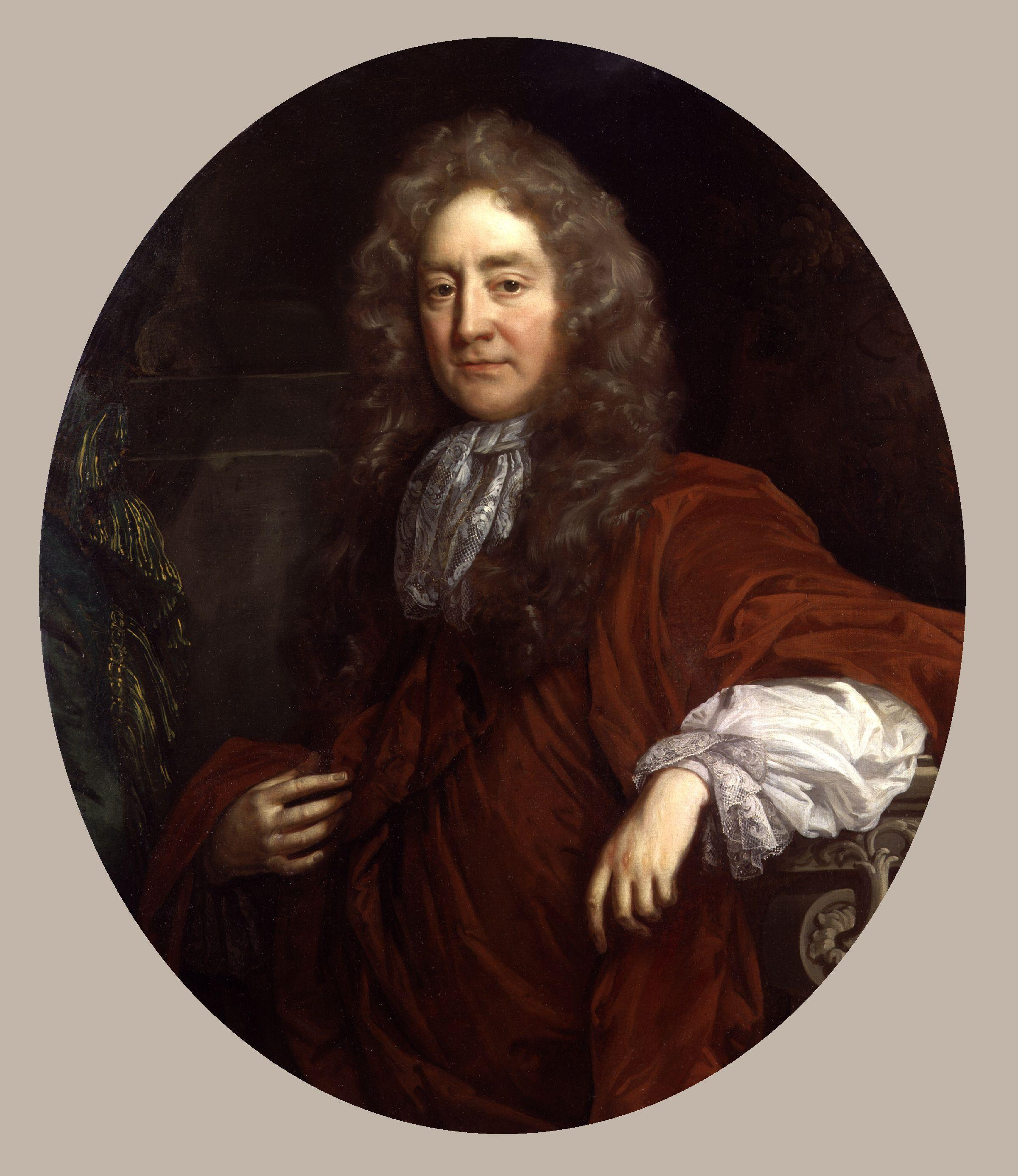
Sir Josiah Child, 1st Baronet

- Sir Josiah Child, 1st Baronet (c. 1630–1699)
- Sir Josiah Child, 2nd Baronet (c. 1668–1704)
- Sir Richard Child, 3rd Baronet (1680–1750) (created Viscount Castlemaine in 1718 and Earl Tylney in 1731)

== Earls Tylney (1731) ==
- Richard Child, 1st Earl Tylney (1680–1750)
- John Tylney, 2nd Earl Tylney (1712–1784)
