= The Assembly at Wanstead House =

Painting by William Hogarth

- Artist: William Hogarth
- Year: c. 1728–1732
- Medium: Oil on canvas
- Dimensions: 64.8 cm × 76.2 cm (25.5 in × 30.0 in)
- Location: Philadelphia Museum of Art

The Assembly at Wanstead House is a c. 1728–1732 group portrait painting by the English artist William Hogarth. It is now in the collection of the Philadelphia Museum of Art in Philadelphia, Pennsylvania.

== Description ==
The painting is believed to have been commissioned to record the 25th wedding anniversary of Richard Child, Viscount Castlemain and his wife Dorothy Glynne Child.

It shows the Viscount in the Long Ballroom of his newly built Wanstead House, seated at an ornate tea-table with his two eldest daughters in the far right foreground, wearing a red coat. His wife, ostensibly the central figure of the painting, suddenly turns away from her card game pointing towards him her card the ace of spades, an allusion to her guests and the viewer that her husband was her winning card; thus does Hogarth bring his patron, the apparently compositionally modestly placed peer into centre-stage. The younger three children form a group in the left foreground.

== See also ==
- List of works by William Hogarth
