= Wanstead House =

Former mansion in England

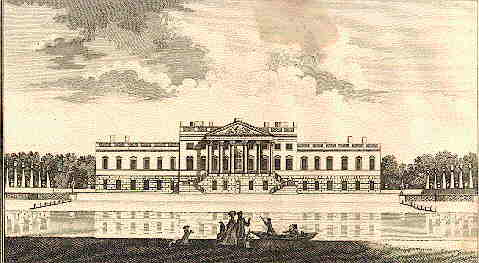

General information
- Year built: 1715-22
- Demolished: 1825
- Owner: Richard Child, 1st Earl Tylney

Design and construction
- Architect: Colen Campbell

Wanstead House was a mansion built to replace the earlier Wanstead Hall. It was commissioned in 1715, completed in 1722 and demolished in 1825. Its gardens now form the municipal Wanstead Park in the London Borough of Redbridge.

== History ==
=== Construction ===
The Assembly at Wanstead House by Hogarth painted c. 1728–1732

Giltwood scroll-foot seat, early Georgian, from Wanstead House, sold by Christie's in 2008 for £135,000. It may be of the set of the chair on which Earl Tylney is seated in the Hogarth painting.

Sir Richard Child gathered large estates, including Wanstead Manor, partly by his 1703 marriage to Dorothy Glynne, whose mother was of the Tylney family of Tylney Hall in Rotherwick, Hampshire. In 1715 Child commissioned the Scottish architect Colen Campbell to design a grand mansion in the then emerging Neo-Palladian style, to replace the former house, and to rival contemporary mansions such as Blenheim Palace. When completed in 1722 it covered an area of 260 ft (79 m). by 70 ft (21 m), the facade having a portico with six Corinthian columns, the earliest in England.

=== Heirs ===
During the house's construction, in 1718, Child had been created 1st Viscount Castlemaine. When Child's wife's cousin Ann Tylney died in 1730, Dorothy and her husband Viscount Castlemain inherited the Tylney estates. Castlemain was created 1st Earl Tylney the following year (1731) and in 1734 obtained an Act of Parliament to change the name of his family, including his heirs, from the patronymic to Tylney, probably to meet a condition of his wife's inheritance. On the death of the Earl in 1750 he was succeeded by his 38-year-old son John Tylney, 2nd Earl Tylney. When the 2nd Earl died without male issue in 1784, the estates passed to his elder sister Emma's son Sir James Long, 7th Baronet, who being then in possession of the vast estates of the Longs, the Childs and the Tylneys, assumed the surname Tylney-Long for himself and his descendants, again probably in accordance with a requirement of the inheritance. On the death of the 7th Baronet in 1794 the combined estate passed to his one-year-old infant son Sir James Tylney-Long, 8th Baronet, who died in 1805 aged just 11. The estate then passed to his young sister, eldest of three, Catherine Tylney-Long, who thereby became the richest heiress in England.

=== Decline and fall ===
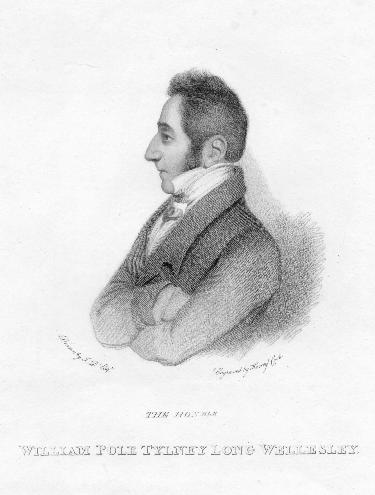
William Pole-Tylney-Long-Wellesley, c. 1812

In 1812 Catherine took the disastrous step of accepting the marriage proposal from the later-notorious rake, William Wellesley-Pole, nephew of two famous uncles, Richard Wellesley, 2nd Earl of Mornington, eldest brother of his father William, and Arthur Wellesley, Duke of Wellington from 1813, his father's younger brother. The Wellesleys played no part in securing the marriage into their family of this great heiress. Shortly before the wedding Catherine's husband had changed his family surname by Royal Licence to Pole-Tylney-Long-Wellesley.

Wellesley was an MP initially from 1812 to 1820 but was principally known for his dissipation and extravagance. On his marriage the estate had been conveyed to a trust from which Catherine would receive £11,000 per annum for life, with the rest to the use of Wellesley for his life. The remainder was to go to the sons produced from the marriage. To secure a debt of £250,000, he managed to mortgage this marriage settlement trust, which owned Wanstead House and contents, to his creditors. In 1822, to escape his creditors, he obtained the office of Usher to George IV (himself experienced in profligacy and evading creditors) which rendered him immune to arrest for debt, and later he fled his creditors abroad. In June 1822 the trustees of the settlement, under a power contained within the trust and having obtained the requisite agreement of the couple, auctioned off the house's contents in an auction lasting 32 days, in order to pay off the encumbrances on the settled estate, thereby protecting the son's future inheritance. In 1825, having found no-one to rent Wanstead House, the trustees demolished it under the same powers and applied the proceeds from the sale of the resultant building materials in a similar fashion. Under the terms of Sir James Tylney Long's will, Wanstead House was inalienable from the Park – which could not be sold for 1000 years. This is why the mansion was sold for demolition. The sum raised was only £10,000 whilst it had reputedly cost around £360,000 to build. Catherine, having been abandoned by her husband for another woman in 1823, died in 1825 of an intestinal illness, shortly after the demolition, no doubt a broken woman.

Between the mansion's demolition and 1840, William retained a life interest in Catherine's remaining lands, to the extent of 1,400 acres (5.7 km^{2}), in surrounding Wanstead and the adjoining parishes of Woodford, Leyton, Little Ilford and Barking. He continued his parliamentary career from 1830 to 1832, inherited his father's title as 4th Earl of Mornington in 1845 and died in humble lodgings in 1857. The remnant of the manor of Wanstead was inherited by his son William, who had been protected from his father's designs on his maternal inheritance by the intervention of the Duke of Wellington, and he left it in trust for his father's cousin Henry Wellesley, 1st Earl Cowley. In 1880 the Earl sold 184 acres (0.74 km^{2}) of the former house's grounds to the Corporation of London for preservation as a part of Epping Forest, and the resultant new municipal park of Wanstead was officially opened by the City of London Corporation in 1882. The Earl's family sold further land to Wanstead Sports Grounds Limited in 1920.

== Gardens ==
Map of Wanstead House and grounds from John Rocque's map printed in Environs of London, 1745. Today's Wanstead Park is shown in green. The house stood at 51°34′10.62″N 0°2′1.31″E.

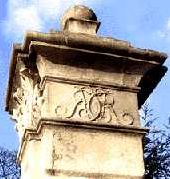
One of a pair of surviving piers of the entrance gate to Wanstead House, with the monogram of Richard Child

The grounds were landscaped and planted with formal avenues of trees by George London, one of the leading garden designers of his day. John Rocque was commissioned by the 1st Earl Tylney in 1735 to carry out further work on the gardens, aimed to turn Wanstead into a mini Versailles. One of the best sources for the house and gardens' appearance at that time is Rocque's map, printed in Environs of London.

About 275 yards (250 m) to the mansion's west was a large octagonal ornamental lake called the "Basin", due south of what is now the golf course club-house, built of brick and weather-boarded timber, a remnant of the 18th-century stable-court. The mansion also had a front lawn to its west, part of which now forms a cricket ground. A drive started at entrance gates one-third mile (0.5 km) due west, the two stone piers of which still survive standing either side of Overton Drive at its junction with Blake Hall Road. The piers are embellished with the monogram of their builder, Sir Richard Child. Spencer's 1771 view of the house would have been drawn from this gate.

This drive skirted the Basin's north side (now Overton Drive) then followed the lake's contour southwards to arrive at the mansion's west front. The extensive fruit and vegetable gardens originally situated to the south-east of the Great House have all gone, these now forming the links of the Golf Course. Two walnut trees which died in the 1980s, the largest 40 feet (12 m) high and 7 ft 6 in (2.3 m) in girth, probably themselves planted by Sir Josiah Child, stood to the east of the Shoulder of Mutton pond. Thickets of Rhododendron recall the time when part of the Park was laid out as a shrubbery, traversed by the winding paths shown in Rocque's map. Remains of an impressive avenue of sweet-chestnuts, called Evelyn's Avenue, can still be traced in a south westerly direction from the basin, crossing Wanstead Flats and Bush Wood.

The 2nd Earl Tylney continued the plantings, but in the then fashionable natural and non-formal style. In 1813, William Pole-Tylney-Long-Wellesley invited the landscaper Humphrey Repton to improve the gardens - some of Repton's informal planting remains today. Before 1828 Wellesley in a search for money cut down a great number of trees in the park, destroying many of the avenues, vistas and clumps so carefully planted earlier at such great expense by Sir Josiah Child and the Earls Tylney. He had marked a further 2,000 for felling when his son obtained an injunction in 1828 preventing him from proceeding, since it would damage the value of the land, his future inheritance. Wellesley challenged the injunction but it was confirmed against him in 1834.

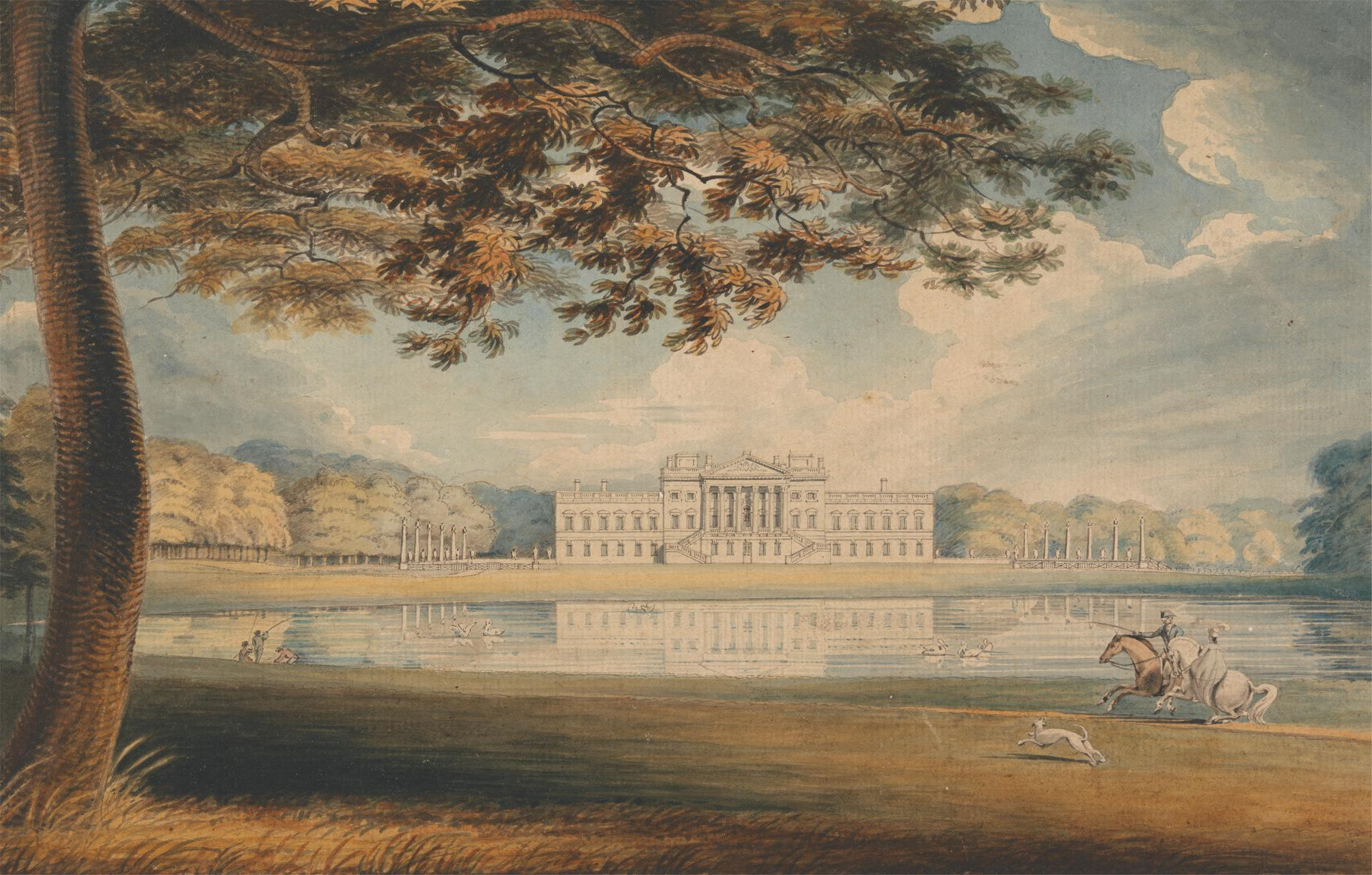
Pastoral scene before Wanstead House and Basin, by William Havell, 1815

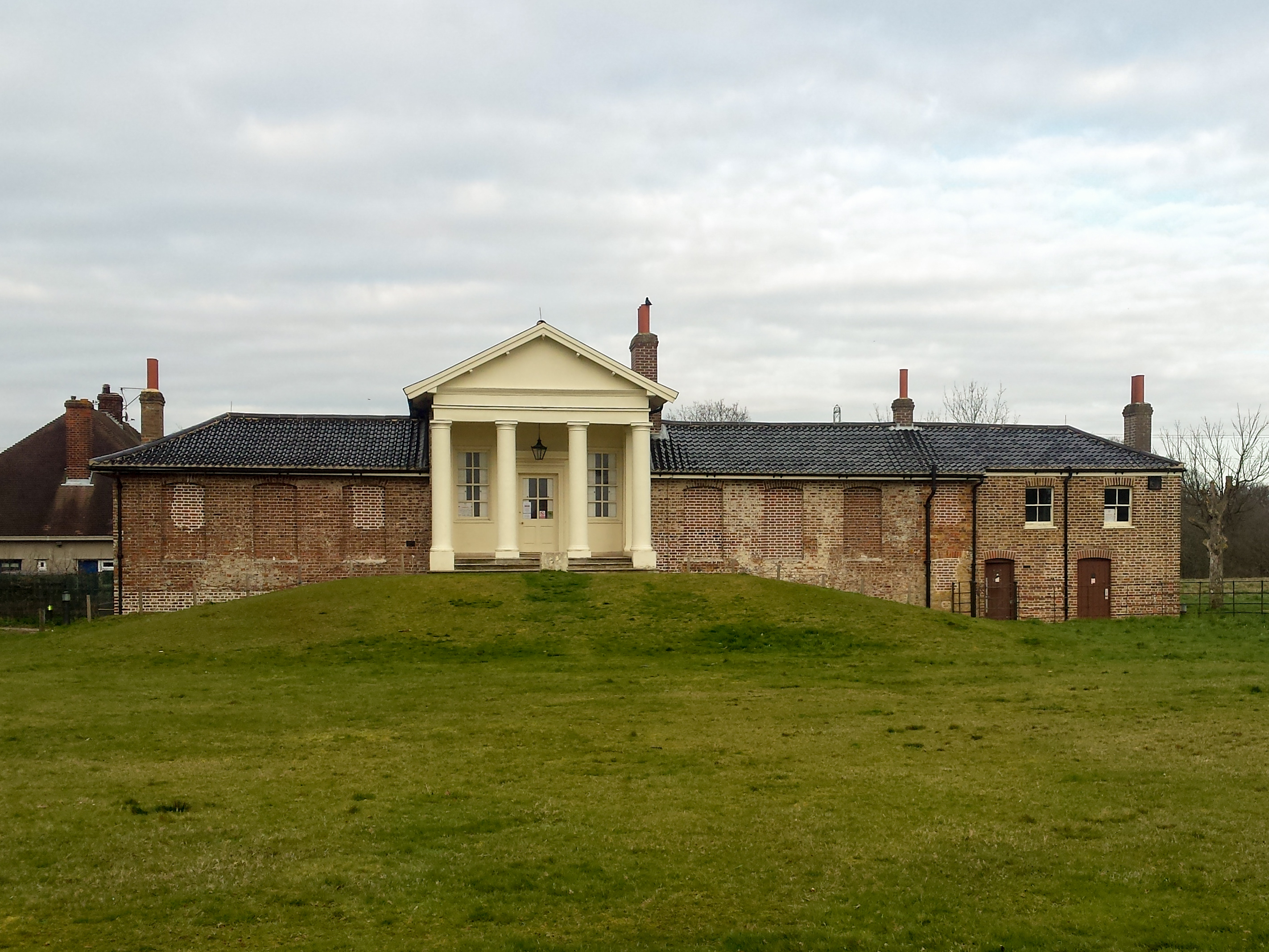
The Temple in Wanstead Park, built c. 1760

The present Wanstead Park retains some of its layout as the House's gardens. Apart from the lake system, the most evident survivals are the buildings known as the Temple and the Grotto, both built in about 1760 (now listed buildings), and some “mounts” or artificial mounds. The Temple is now open every weekend with displays on the history of Wanstead Park including finds excavated from the 18th-century grotto and the 'Lost Roman Villa'. Less obvious, perhaps, is a group of islands known as the Fortifications, an amphitheatre, an ornamental canal and remains of some avenues of trees. The Fortifications are situated on the Ornamental Waters about 800 yards (730 m) east of the site of the mansion, to the south-east of the large Lincoln Island. They consist of eight small islands grouped in a circular pattern around a larger central island on which duck-shooting guns were formerly stored. The bridges by which they were once connected no longer exist. The islands are now somewhat overgrown, providing a sanctuary for water-birds.

The wide Ornamental Canal forms a continuation on the eastern far side of the River Roding, here called the Ornamental Waters, of the broad grassy ride cut through the woodland, known as the Glade, in a direct easterly line from Wanstead House. It therefore would have created a magnificent vista from the house, stretching two-thirds mile (1.1 km) to the east. It was noted by Eric S. Wood F.S.A. as being a "magnificent canal".

== Drawings ==
Campbell published his plans for Wanstead House in the first volume of Vitruvius Britannicus. The plans include the unbuilt first scheme for the house, as well as the second scheme that was executed. The first scheme would have been 200 feet in length, while the second scheme that was built was 260 feet long, though its upper storey covered only part of the middle section of the house. Campbell's annotation for the unbuilt first elevation notes that it was "as intended by Sir Richard Child." The elevation drawing of the second scheme includes a cupola that was not constructed. In the third volume of the series, Campbell included a drawing for a proposed tower addition to the house that was never realised.

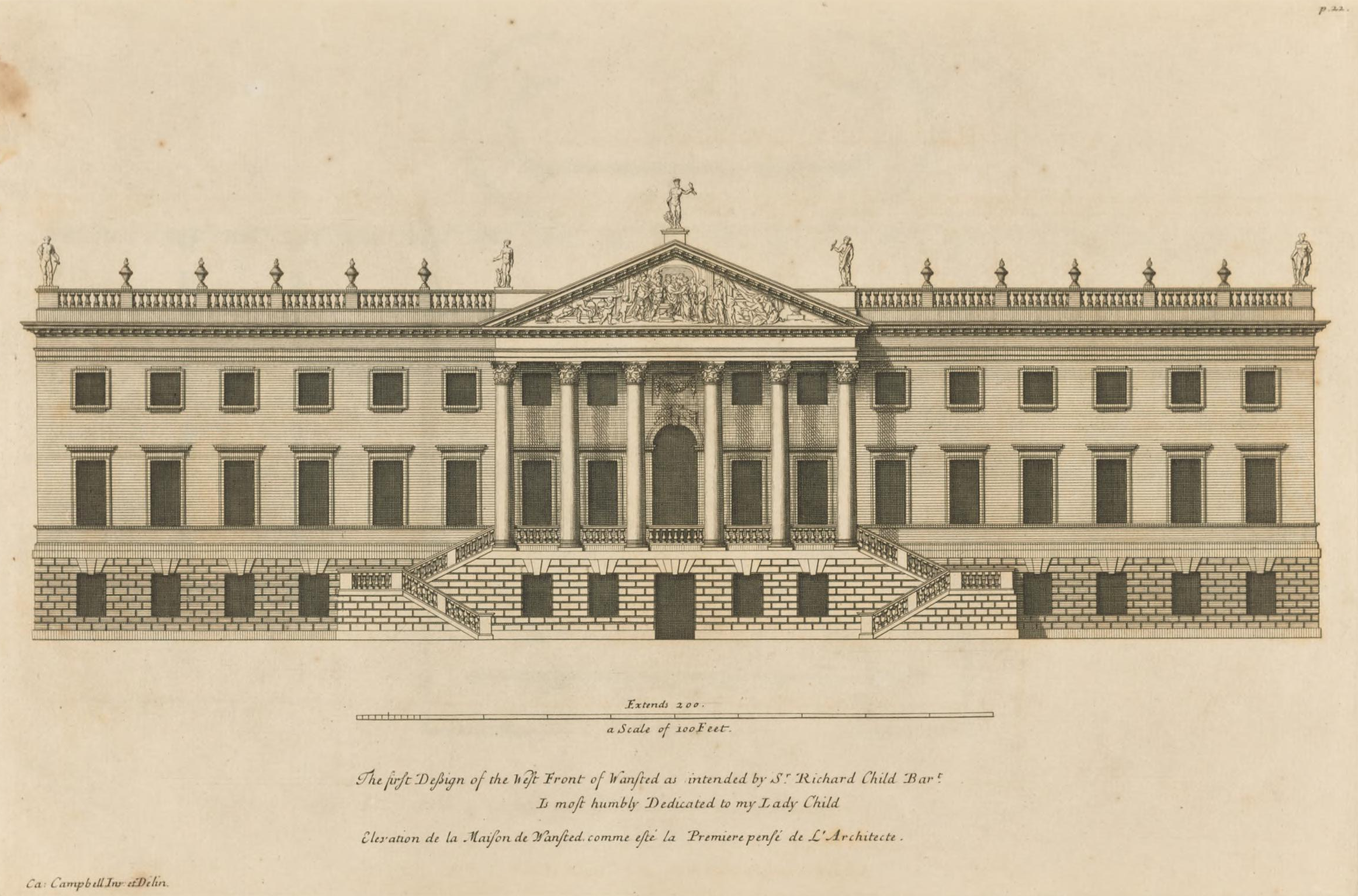
Elevation of the first scheme (unbuilt)

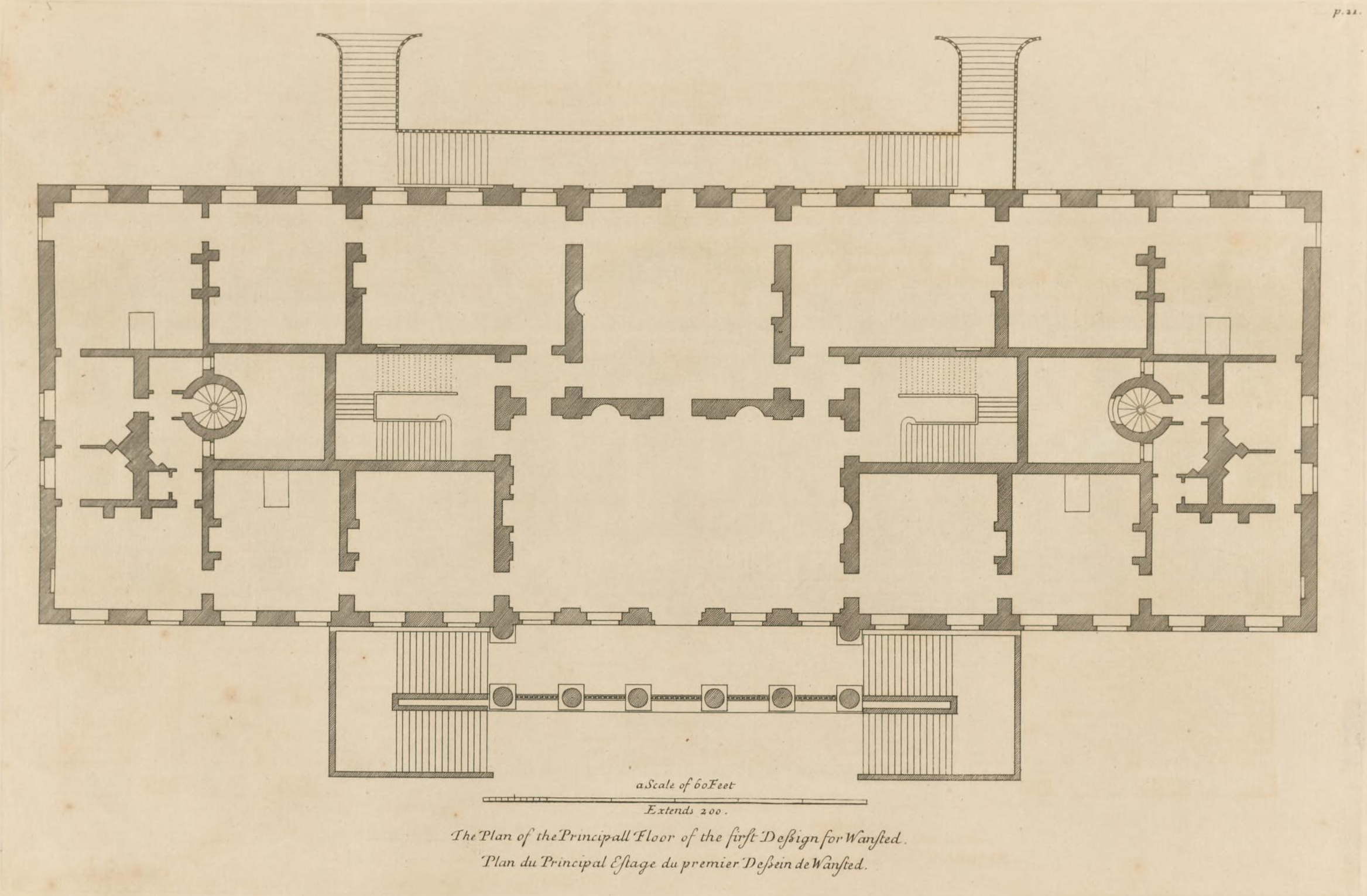
Floor plan of the first scheme (unbuilt)

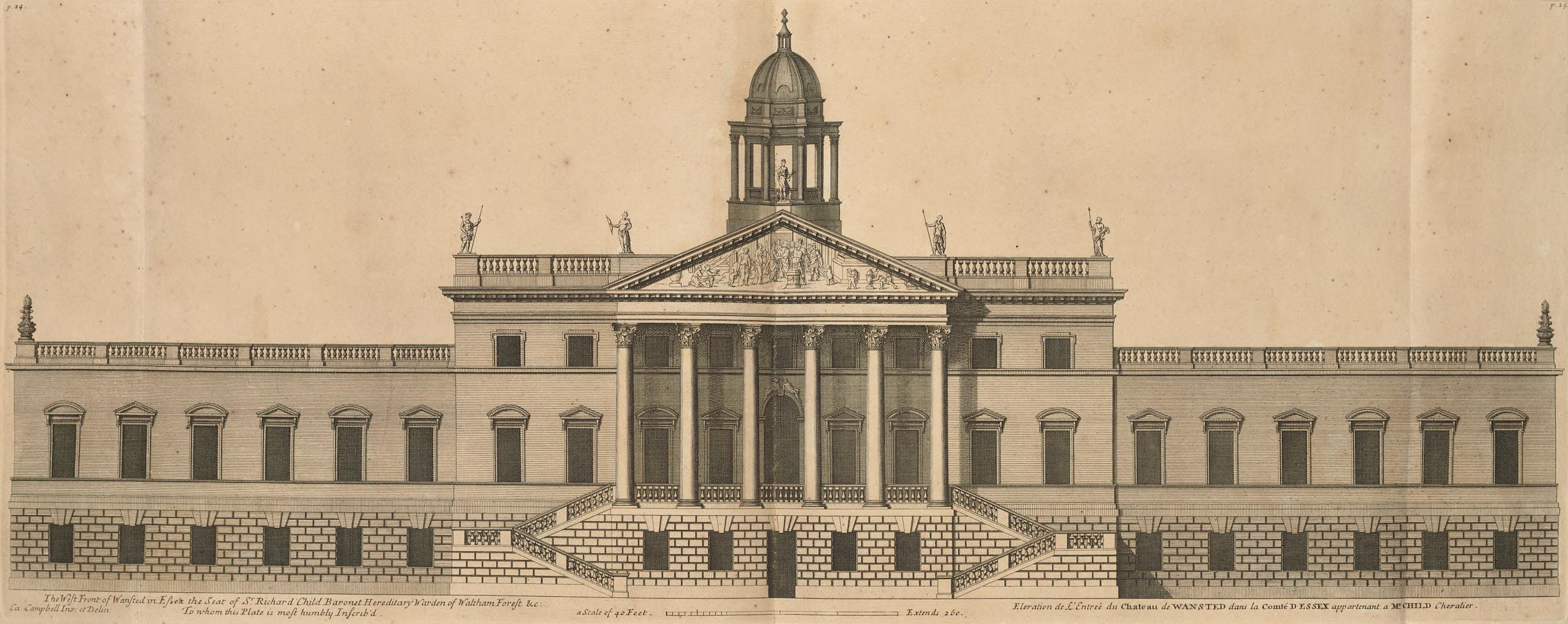
Elevation as built

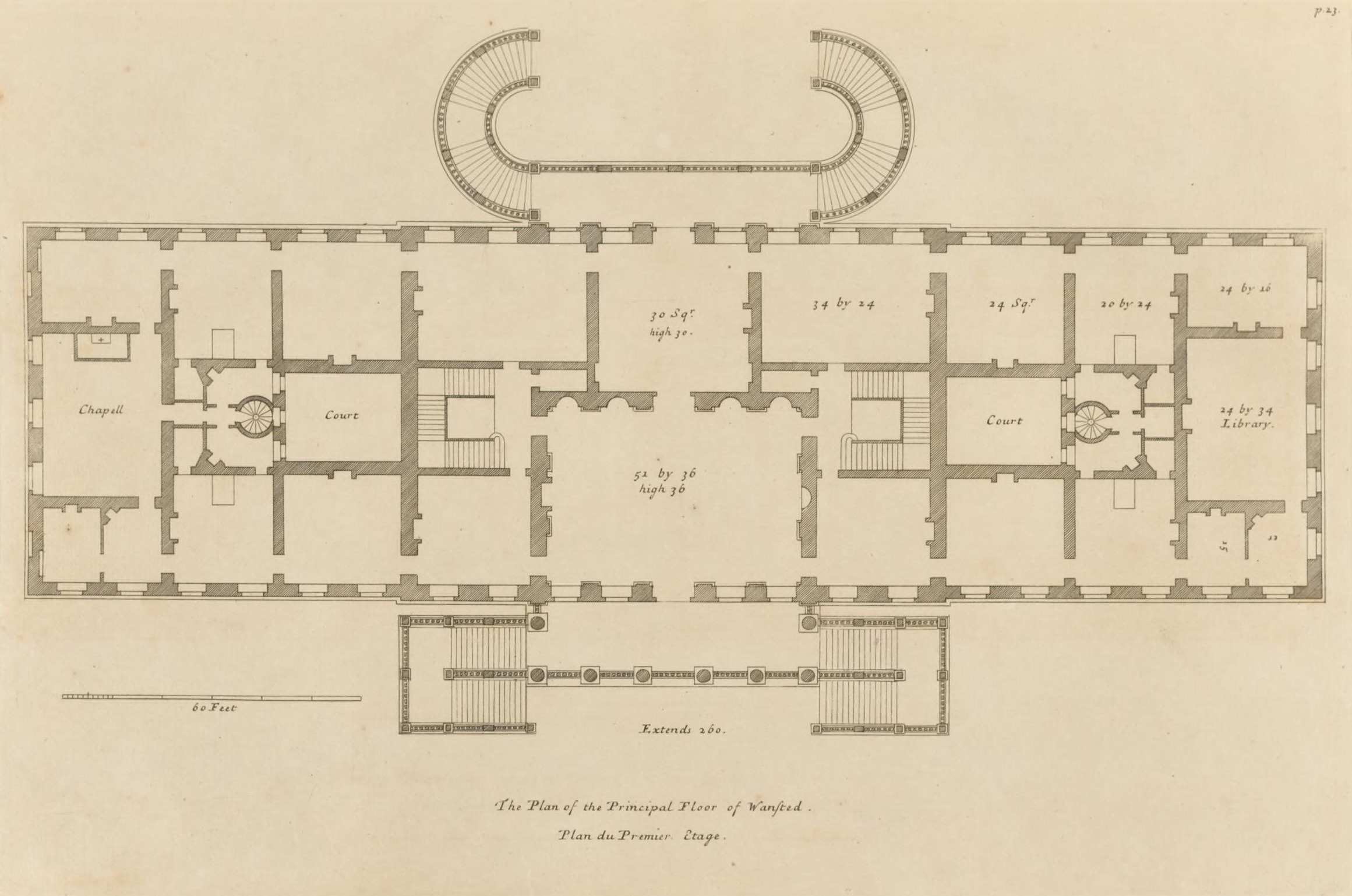
Floor plan as built

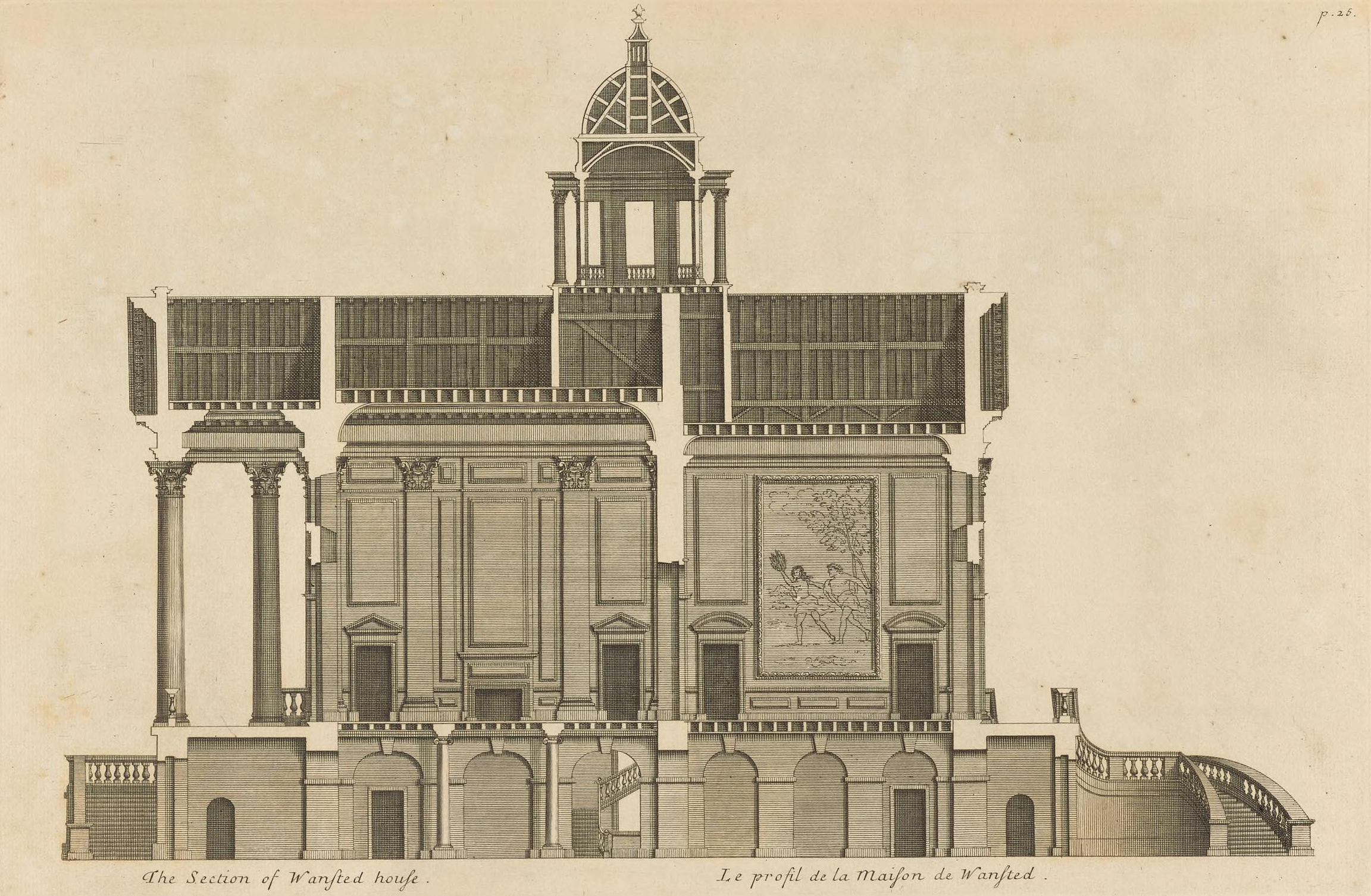
Section through the center of the house

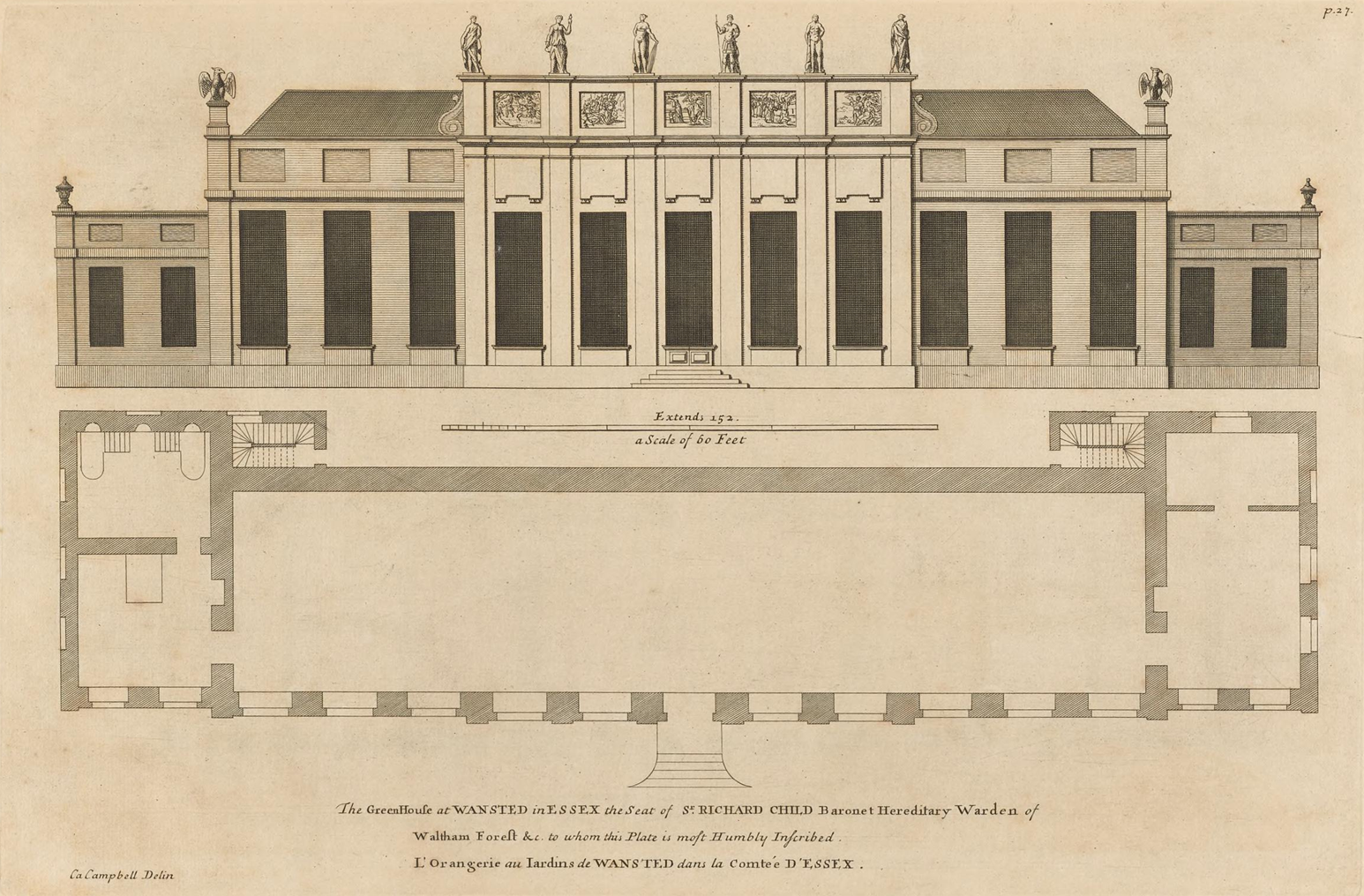
Greenhouse, or orangery

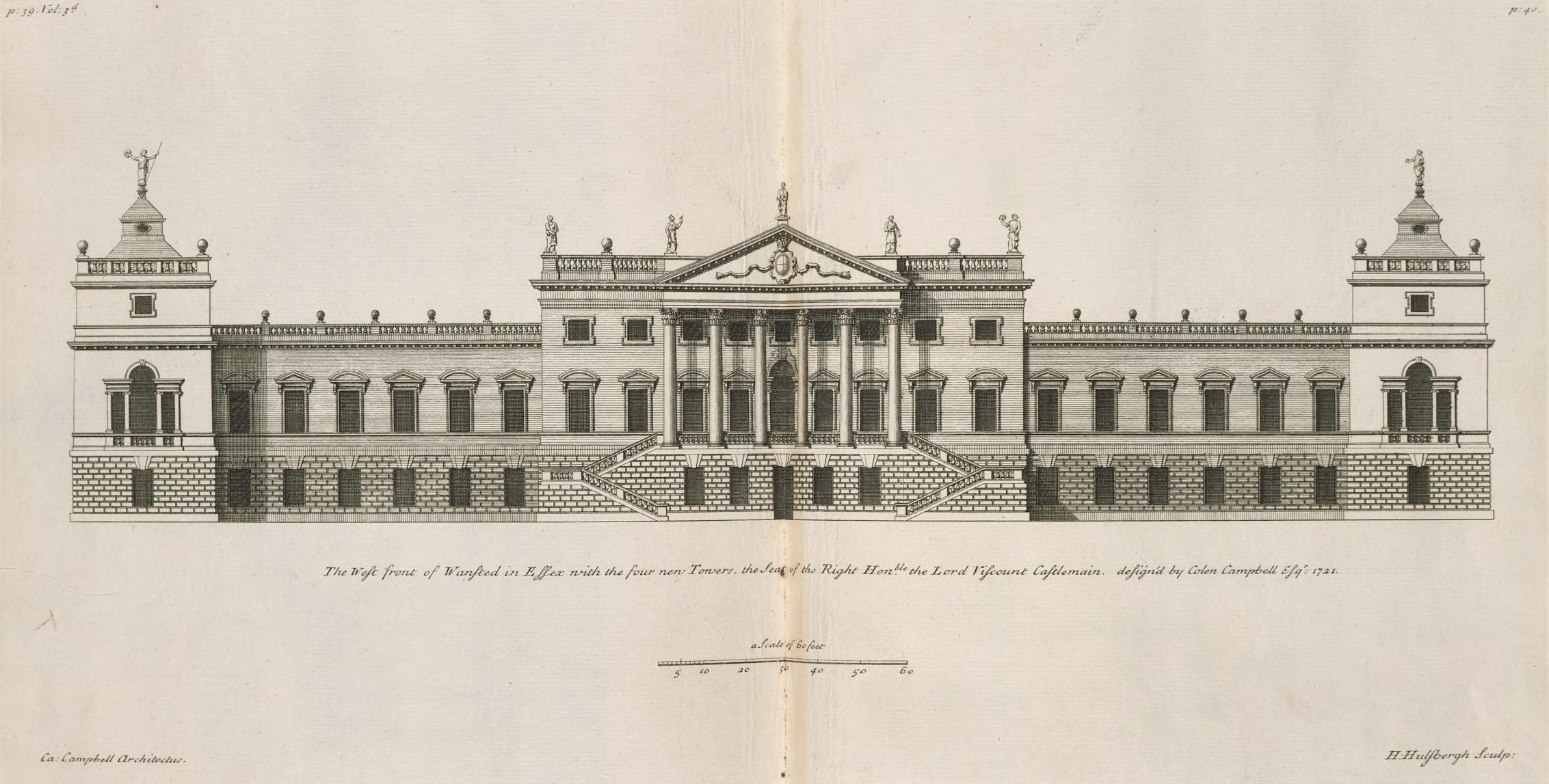
Proposed tower addition (unbuilt)

== Sources ==
- The Architecture of Wanstead House - PDF published 2024 available from https://wansteadarchitecture.com/portfolio/wanstead-house/
- Wanstead House and the Parklands - a History, www.wansteadwildlife.org.uk. (June 2010). This article has drawn heavily from this source.
- Cornish, Alan. M.Sc. Wanstead Park - A Chronicle. (Originally published by the Friends of Wanstead Parklands in 1982, updated and republished by Wanstead Parklands Community Project in 2006.)
- Ramsey, Winston G. & Fowkes, Reginald L. Epping Forest: Then and Now. Published by Battle of Britain Prints International Ltd., 1986.
