= Richard Child, 1st Earl Tylney =

English politician (1680–1750)

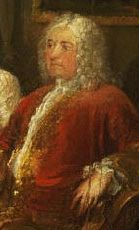
Richard Child when Viscount Castlemain, circa 1728. Detail from The Assembly at Wanstead, by Hogarth (see full size below).

The Assembly at Wanstead House by William Hogarth painted between 1728 & 1731. The Child family has gathered for tea drinking and card playing in the ballroom of Wanstead House. The painting probably records the celebration of the 1728 25th wedding anniversary of Lord and Lady Castlemaine. Dressed in rich red velvet, Lord Castlemaine is seated on the far right at an ornate tea-table with his twin daughters whilst his wife, playing cards in the centre, turns towards her husband and shows him her winning card, the ace of spades, alluding to their winning partnership. The couple's other children stand at the far left. (Philadelphia Museum of Art, M1928-1-13)

Richard Child, 1st Earl Tylney (5 February 1680 – March 1750), was an English politician who sat in the House of Commons between 1708 and 1734. Initially a Tory, he switched to supporting the Whigs after 1715. He held no Office of State, nor any commercial directorship of significance, but is remembered chiefly as the builder of the now long-demolished Palladian "princely mansion" Wanstead House, one of the first in the style constructed in Britain. In the furnishing of his mansion Child became the main patron of the Flemish painter Old Nollekens. He died in March 1750 aged 70 at Aix-en-Provence, France, and was buried on 29 May 1750 at Wanstead.

== Family background ==
Richard Child was baptised at St Mary the Virgin, Wanstead on 5 February 1680, the third son of the wealthy Sir Josiah Child (1630–1699) Governor of the East India Company, who had been created 1st Baronet of Wanstead in 1678, by his third wife Emma Barnard (died 16 October 1725), daughter of Sir Henry Barnard, of Bridgnorth, Shropshire, Turkey merchant of London. He was appointed as residuary legatee and executor under the will of his father, whose death occurred before Richard's majority. Richard then on 12 February 1700 petitioned Parliament for a bill, to vest certain lands in trustees, so that settlements made upon the marriage of his half-brother Josiah could be honoured.

In 1703 Richard married Dorothy Glynne, daughter and co-heiress of John Glynne, younger son of Sir John Glynne (died 1666), Lord Chief Justice, of Henley Park, Surrey, and Dorothy Tylney, daughter of Francis Tylney of Tylney Hall, Rotherwick, Hampshire. On 20 January 1704 he succeeded his half-brother Sir Josiah Child, 2nd Baronet, to the Baronetcy and to the Child manor of Wanstead, Essex, 6 miles north-east of the City of London. He also inherited a fortune of £4,000 per annum, which brought his total income to £10,000.

== Building of Wanstead House ==
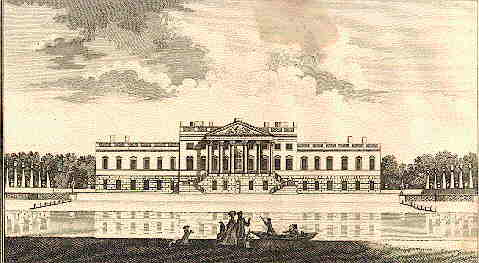
The Palladian Wanstead House in 1771; commissioned in 1715 by Sir Richard Child from a design by Colen Campbell. By the time of its completion in 1722 Child had been created 1st Viscount Castlemaine. In 1731 he was created Earl Tylney. Illustration from Nathaniel Spencer, The Complete English Traveller, London 1771.

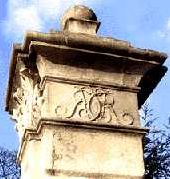
One of a pair of surviving piers of the entrance gate to Wanstead House, with monogram of Richard Child

Following the first Baronet's death, his heir Josiah had leased Wanstead to his half-brother Richard. Coming into full possession of it, Sir Richard Child, 3rd Baronet, commissioned in 1715 the Scottish architect Colen Campbell to build a palatial Palladian mansion to replace the former manor house. By the time of its completion in 1722 Wanstead House had provided Child with a grand seat befitting his newly obtained status as Viscount Castlemaine, a creation of 1718.

== Political career ==
Sir Richard Child stood unsuccessfully as a Tory candidate for Essex at the 1705 general election, with the backing of Henry Compton, Bishop of London. At the 1708 general election, he was returned unopposed as Tory Member of Parliament for Maldon, Essex. During this session he acted as a teller for the minority in favour of an adjournment during the debate on the Whitchurch election, which had been fought by his wife's relative, Frederick Tylney. The House resolved that Tylney had not been duly elected. He also voted against the impeachment of Dr Henry Sacheverell.

At the 1710 general election, Child was elected Tory MP for Essex on behalf of the Church Party, topping the poll. Over 90% of his vote consisted of "Plumpers", indicating his high popularity. He was a member of the October Club and in 1711 he was listed as one of the "Worthy Patriots" who had drawn attention to the mismanagement of the previous government. He voted for the French commerce bill on 18 June 1713. At the 1713 general election, he was returned unopposed for Essex, again with Compton’s support. He had become unpopular in the House, and Robert Harley referred to him as a jobber who had ‘made a prey of the poor’.

In spite of this and the Hanoverian succession which favoured the Whigs, Child was again elected MP for Essex at the 1715 general election. Returned as a Tory he began to support the Whig government, voting for the Septennial Bill in 1716. His main concern was to obtain a peerage and although he purchased an Irish peerage from the Duchess of Munster in 1715, he had to wait until 1718 before he was created Baron Newtown and Viscount Castlemaine. As these were Irish peerages, he was still able to sit in the House of Commons. He voted for the repeal of the Occasional Conformity and Schism Acts, and against the Peerage Bill in 1719. He was defeated in the contest for Essex at the 1722 general election but was returned unopposed for Essex at the 1727 general election. He voted consistently for the government and by Act of Parliament. At the 1734 general election, he stood down from parliament in favour of his son John Tylney who failed to be elected.

== First elevation to the Peerage ==
In June 1711 a rumour emerged that Child was about to purchase a peerage for £10,000 from the administration under Queen Anne, which prompted Thomas Viscount Windsor to complain: "that's beginning too soon to be like the Duchess of Marlborough, to do anything for money, making a man that's no gentleman a lord". The rumour of a peerage resurfaced in the winter of 1711 and in March 1713, and proved true when on 24 April 1718, he was raised to the Peerage of Ireland as Baron Newtown, in the County of Donegal, and Viscount Castlemaine, in the County of Kerry. It is not known whether he ever took his seat in the Irish House of Lords; the title was designed only to give social status. The title of Castlemain was somewhat discredited, having last been granted in 1661 to Roger Palmer, 1st Earl of Castlemain, whose wife was Barbara Villiers, mistress of King Charles II, to whom the King wished to give status. The patent confined the remainder to the heirs of her body, not his. Palmer himself never took his seat in the Irish Parliament, and had died in 1705.

== Inheritance of Tylney estates ==
Descendants of William Lord Craven's Names Act 1723
- Act of Parliament
- Parliament of Great Britain
- Long title: An Act for adding the Surname of Tylney to the Descendants of the Right Honourable William Lord Craven and Anne his Wife, sole Daughter and Heir of Frederick Tylney Esquire.
- Citation: 10 Geo. 1. c. 13 Pr.
- Territorial extent: Great Britain

Dates
- Royal assent: 24 April 1724
- Commencement: 9 January 1724 (Note: Start of session.)
Other legislation
Relates to	Lord Castlemain's Name Act 1732

Status: Current legislation

In 1730 Child's wife Dorothy Glynne inherited the Tylney estates in Hampshire from her cousin Ann Tylney (died 5 Feb. 1729/30), Lady Craven, wife of William Craven, 3rd Baron Craven (died 1739), and daughter and sole heiress of Frederick Tylney (died 1725) (who had built Tylney Hall in 1700), by Ann, daughter of George Pitt (died 1745) of Stratfield Saye, Hampshire. Lady Craven's daughter had predeceased her in 1725 and — although Lord and Lady Craven had obtained a private act of Parliament, Descendants of William Lord Craven's Names Act 1723 (10 Geo. 1. c. 13 Pr.) authorising their descendants to bear both their surnames (Craven and Tylney) — ultimately their marriage was without surviving issue. Ann Tylney, Lady Craven was buried at Binley, Coventry.

=== Tylney family of Hampshire ===
In 1629 Richard Tylney purchased the manor of Rotherwick from Richard More. Tylney was already by then a local landowner. His descendant Frederick Tylney, who stood as MP for Whitchurch in January 1708, built a great mansion on the estate in 1700, called Tylney Hall. It was rebuilt in 1898 in the Victorian style, and is now a country hotel. A marble monument exists in the north aisle of Rotherwick church to Frederick Tylney (d. 1725), erected by his widow Anne, which displays their combined coats of arms, of which Tylney is: "Argent, a chevron between 3 griffons' heads erased gules".

== Creation of Tylney Earldom ==
Lord Castlemain's Name Act 1732
- Act of Parliament
- Parliament of Great Britain
- Long title: An Act to enable Richard Child Esquire (commonly called Lord Castlemain) and the Heirs of his Body, and such other Persons who, by virtue of a Settlement made by Frederick Tylney Esquire deceased, shall be in the Possession of the Estates therein limited, to take and use the Surname of Tylney.
- Citation: 6 Geo. 2. c. 27 Pr.
- Territorial extent: Great Britain

Dates
- Royal assent: 13 June 1733
- Commencement: 16 January 1733
Other legislation
Relates to	Descendants of William Lord Craven's Names Act 1723

Status: Current legislation

On 11 June 1731, Viscount Castlemaine was created Earl Tylney, of Castlemaine in the County of Kerry, a title in the Peerage of Ireland. On 13 June 1733 the earl assumed by private act of Parliament, Lord Castlemain's Name Act 1732 (6 Geo. 2. c. 27 Pr.) the surname, for himself and his heirs, of Tylney in lieu of his patronymic, to meet a requirement of his wife's inheritance. His eldest surviving son Richard, styled from the creation of his father's earldom in 1731 by the courtesy title (his father's lesser title) of Viscount Castlemaine, died in 1734 without issue, predeceasing his father.

== Patron of Old Nollekens ==
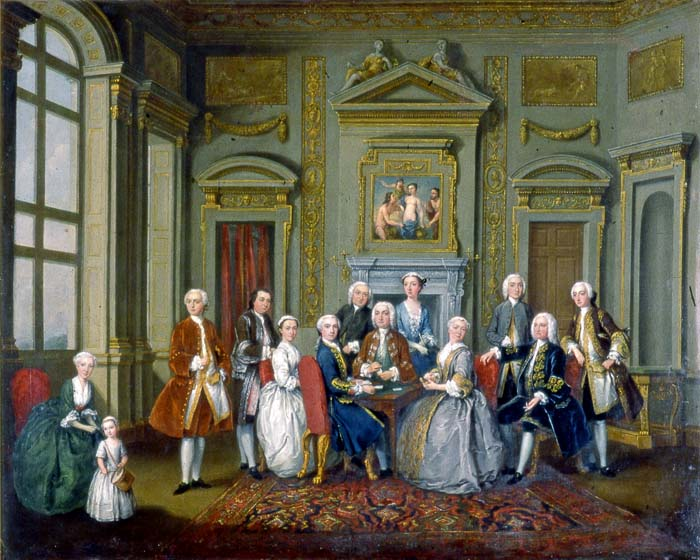
The Tylney Family in the Saloon at Wanstead by Old Nollekens, 1740. The Earl is seated at right, attended by his son John, right; his wife sits at the table opposite 3rd son Lt. Josiah RN, whilst a daughter in blue stands behind. To the left is the infant James Long, with his father Sir Robert Long and Lady Emma Long, closer to the table (coll. Fairfax House, York, CT198.327).

Child was the main patron of the Flemish painter Joseph Francis Nollekens, known as Old Nollekens to distinguish him from his better known sculptor son Joseph Nollekens. The following pictures by him were some of the 16 by Nollekens included in the great sale by auction held at Wanstead House in 1822 shortly before its demolition (source: catalogue, with prices realised):

- Lot 10. "A pair—the Juvenile Artists and Companion, a Boy spinning his Top," £25.
- Lot 16. "A pair—the Juvenile Parties; Card-builders and Players at Tetotum," £17.
- Lot 138. "Dancing Figures, a sketch, in a French carved frame", £1 2s.
- Lot 225. "Rural Recreations, painted with all the taste and elegance of Watteau," £6 6s.
- Lot 307. "A Boy beating a Drum, and a small Landscape, and two curious models of the Stag and Fox in wax," £8, 15s.
- Lot 308. "The Wine-Traders, painted with the tasteful elegance of Watteau," £31 10s.
- Lot 3ll. "Females Bathing, in a Landscape, with a distant view of Wanstead-house," £8 18s 6d.
- Lot 314. "Landscape, Buildings," &c. £7.
- Lot 316. "Landscape and Figures, with a youth playing the guitar."

Other Nollekens paintings associated with Wanstead are:

- Music Party, supposedly at Wanstead House (but bearing no resemblance to the house - not sold from the Longleat ex Beriah Botfield Christie's sale, 2002)
- Lord and Lady Tylney at Wanstead House (Longleat House Coll. - ex Beriah Botfield)
- Music Party before the Lake at Wanstead. (Sold by Christie's 25/6/1965)

== Succession ==
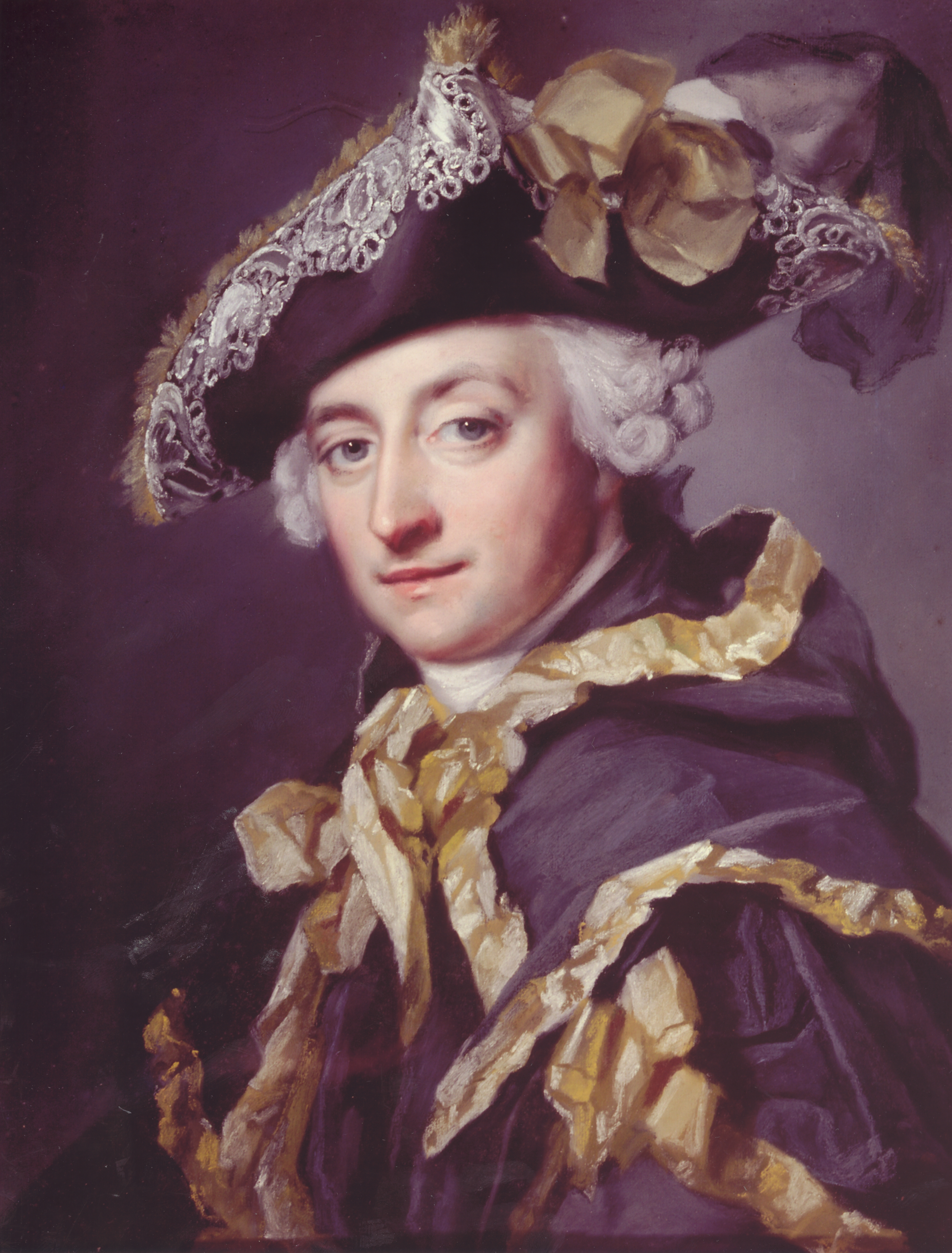
Hon. Josiah Child(d.1760), by Francis Cotes, collection of Lydiard Park, Swindon

Earl Tylney and his wife Dorothy Glynne had seven children:

- Emma (1707-1758), twin. Married Sir Robert Long, 6th Baronet (d. 1767), of Draycot, Wiltshire.
- Elizabeth (1707-1710), twin.
- Frederick (1709-1715)
- Richard (1711-1734), predeceased his father.
- John (1712-1784), 2nd Earl Tylney (see below).
- Dorothy (1717-1786), unmarried.
- Josiah (1718-1760), a Lieutenant or Captain in the Royal Navy, likely to be the officer depicted by Nollekens seated dressed in a blue coat. He seems never to have changed his surname to "Tylney". He married Mrs Henrietta Wymondsold (1729–1763), divorced wife of Charles Wymondsold of Lockinge, Berkshire, only daughter of Robert Knight, 1st Earl of Catherlough. They had a son, Josiah, born shortly before their marriage, who was brought up by his uncle, but died in Florence on 5 July 1774, aged 20. Both Josiah and Henrietta had their portraits painted by Francis Cotes, which are now in the collection of Lydiard Park, Swindon.

On the Earl's death in March 1750, he was succeeded by his eldest surviving son John, who had also adopted the surname Tylney, by private act of Parliament, the Younger Sons of the Duke of Rutland's Names Act 1734 (8 Geo. 2. c. 2 Pr.) after his elder brother Richard's death in 1734. John therefore became the 2nd Earl Tylney. The 2nd Earl was MP (2nd Member) for Malmesbury, Wiltshire (1761–1768), possibly as a result of his family connection with the locally influential Long family, and a Fellow of the Royal Society (1746). On his death in 1784, unmarried, the family titles all became extinct. His heir was Sir James Long, 7th. Baronet, son of his eldest sister Emma and her husband Sir Robert Long, 6th Baronet (died 1767), of Draycot, Wiltshire. The 7th Baronet was required by his inheritance to adopt the name Tylney-Long, which he duly did, becoming Sir James Tylney-Long, 7th Baronet.

== Notes ==
Parliament of Great Britain
Preceded by John Comyns; William Fytche	Member of Parliament for Maldon; 1708–1710; With: Thomas Richmond	Succeeded by John Comyns; Thomas Richmond
Preceded by Thomas Middleton; Sir Francis Masham	Member of Parliament for Essex; 1710–1722; With: Thomas Middleton 1710–1713, 1715; Sir Charles Barrington 1713–1715; William Harvey 1715–1716; Robert Honywood 1716–1722	Succeeded by William Harvey; Robert Honywood
Preceded by William Harvey; Robert Honywood	Member of Parliament for Essex; 1727–1734; With: Sir Robert Abdy	Succeeded by Thomas Bramston; Sir Robert Abdy
Peerage of Ireland
New creation	Earl Tylney; 1731–1750	Succeeded by John Tylney
New creation	Viscount Castlemaine; 1718–1750	Succeeded by John Tylney
Baronetage of England
Preceded by Josiah Child	Baronet (of Wanstead); 1704–1750	Succeeded by John Tylney
