= James Tylney-Long =

English politician (1736–1794)

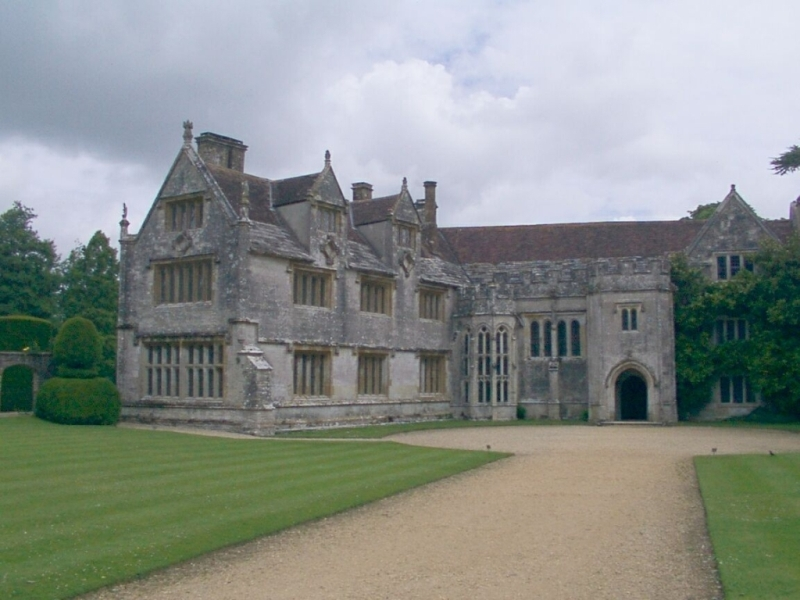
Athelhampton House, Dorset

Sir James Tylney-Long, 7th Baronet (1736 – 28 November 1794) was an English politician who sat in the House of Commons for 32 years from 1762 to 1794.

The eldest son of Sir Robert Long, 6th Baronet and his wife Emma Child, he succeeded his father as the 7th Baronet on 10 February 1767, and inherited the family estates, including the manors of Draycot (Wiltshire) and Athelhampton (Dorset).

== Career ==
He was a member of the Wiltshire Militia, gaining the rank of captain in 1759 and major in 1769, and later formed the Draycot Troop of Yeomanry Cavalry.

In 1784 he inherited the estates of Wanstead (Essex) and Tylney Hall (Hampshire) from his uncle John Tylney, 2nd Earl Tylney, and Sir James took the additional name of Tylney. He became a generous benefactor of public and private charities, living a modest and unassuming lifestyle.

He was Member of Parliament for Marlborough (1762–1780), for Devizes (1780–1788) and elected for Wiltshire in 1788, replacing the late Charles Penruddocke.

He added a new south front, and east and west wings around the core of the medieval manor house of Draycot.

== Family ==
In 1775 Long married firstly, Harriot, fourth daughter of Jacob Bouverie, 1st Viscount Folkestone. She died childless on 12 November 1777. He married in 1785 Lady Catherine Sydney Windsor, daughter of Other Windsor, 4th Earl of Plymouth.

He died at his home Draycot House on 29 November 1794. His wife, Lady Catherine, died in 1823. Their only son, also called James, was born two months before his father's death and became the 8th Baronet. A sickly child, he died on 14 September 1805 just short of his eleventh birthday, and the great estates of the Long, Child and Tylney families devolved chiefly onto the eldest of the 7th Baronet's three daughters, Catherine. The Baronetcy became extinct and Catherine's marriage to spendthrift, high-stakes gambler and adulterous William Pole-Tylney-Long-Wellesley, 4th Earl of Mornington saw the destruction of Wanstead House, Wanstead, Essex (now London), but also produced their son who settled the remaining estates on his first cousin the 2nd Earl Cowley.

Parliament of Great Britain
Preceded by Lord Brudenell; Robert Brudenell	Member of Parliament for Marlborough; 1762–1780; With: Lord Brudenell 1762–1768; James Brudenell 1768–1780	Succeeded by The Earl of Courtown; William Woodley
Preceded by James Sutton; Charles Garth	Member of Parliament for Devizes; 1780–1788; With: Charles Garth 1765–1780; Henry Jones 1780–1784; Henry Addington 1784–1788	Succeeded by Henry Addington; Joshua Smith
Preceded by Charles Penruddocke; Ambrose Goddard	Member of Parliament for Wiltshire; 1788–1795; With: Ambrose Goddard	Succeeded by Ambrose Goddard; Henry Penruddocke Wyndham
Baronetage of England
Preceded by Robert Long	Baronet (of Westminster); 1767–1794	Succeeded by James Tylney-Long
