= Catherine Tylney-Long =

British heiress (1789–1825)

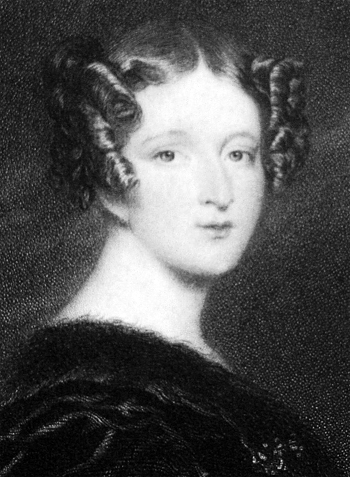
Catherine Tylney-Long by an unknown artist

Catherine Tylney-Long (2 October 1789 – 12 September 1825) was a British heiress, known as "The Wiltshire Heiress".

== Life ==
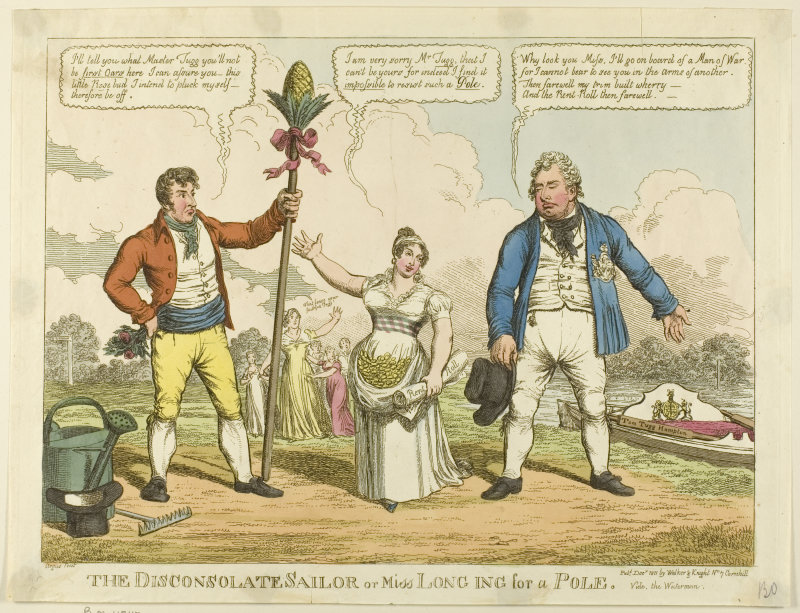
Charles Williams, "The Disconsolate Sailor", 1811 – a cartoon about Catherine's choice between the Duke of Clarence (future William IV, right), whom she found ugly and William Wesley-Pole (left)

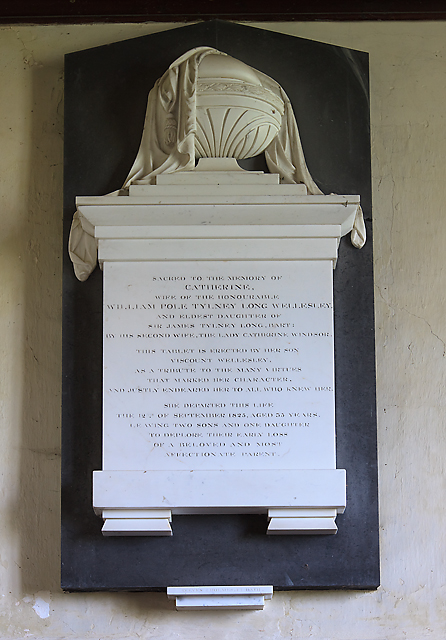
Wall monument to her, "leaving two sons and one daughter to deplore their early loss of a beloved and most affectionate parent"

She was the eldest daughter of Sir James Tylney-Long, 7th Baronet and Lady Catherine Windsor, daughter of the 4th Earl of Plymouth. Her only brother, James, had inherited their father's fortune but died just short of his eleventh birthday in 1805, meaning that the vast estates (see list at Draycot Cerne article) gathered by the 7th Baronet in Essex, Hampshire and Wiltshire and financial investments in hand worth £300,000 (equivalent to about £30,800,000 in 2023) devolved to Catherine. These estates were said to bring in total annual rents of £40,000. She thus became known in fashionable London society as "The Wiltshire Heiress" and was believed to be the richest commoner in England.

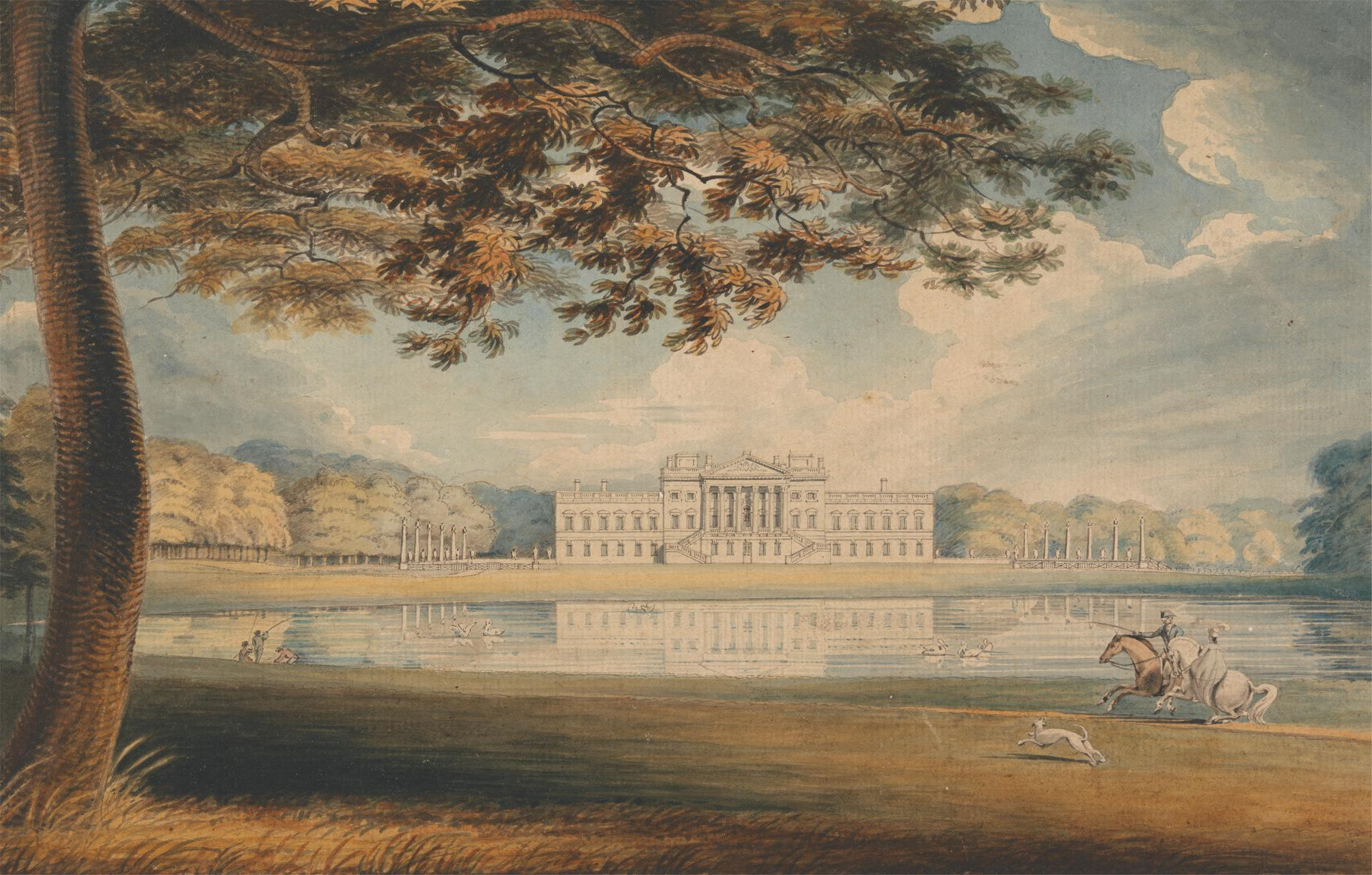
Wanstead House, London Borough of Redbridge

Her suitors included the Duke of Clarence, later King William IV, keen to pay off his great debts. She eventually chose William Wellesley-Pole, who on 14 January 1812 assumed the additional surnames of Tylney-Long, changing his name by Royal Licence. The couple married on 14 March 1812, but his extravagance, arrogance and cruelty meant the marriage was an exceedingly unhappy one.

William gained an appointment as Gentleman Usher to George IV in 1822 (rendering him immune to arrest for debt) and left Britain to escape his creditors around 1823. Catherine implied in a letter to her sisters that her husband had given her a venereal disease. While on the continent he began a relationship with Helena Paterson Bligh (d. 7 April 1869), the wife of Captain Thomas Bligh of the Coldstream Guards, abandoning Catherine entirely.

She died at age 35 in Richmond, Surrey, leaving their children, William, James and Victoria, in the care of her two unmarried sisters, Dorothy and Emma. She had just received a letter from William, whose contents apparently caused her to have some form of seizure. William had had only a life interest in Catherine's property, although he was responsible for the demolition of Wanstead House in 1825 to pay off some of his debts and also unsuccessfully tried to gain custody of their eldest child William, on whom Catherine's fortune had devolved.
