= John Tylney, 2nd Earl Tylney =

English aristocrat and member of parliament

John Tylney
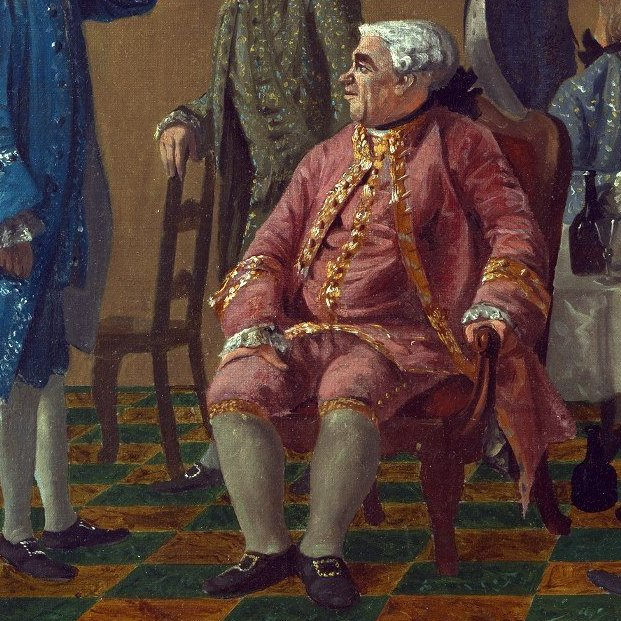
- a caricature of Earl Tylney
- Born: John Child; 1712; England
- Died: 17 September 1784 (aged 71–72); Naples
- Education: Christ Church in Oxford

John Tylney, 2nd Earl Tylney (1712 – 17 September 1784) was an English aristocrat and member of parliament who moved to Italy after a homosexual scandal.

== Life ==
Younger Sons of the Duke of Rutland's Names Act 1734
- Act of Parliament
- Parliament of Great Britain
- Long title: An Act for enabling the Two Younger Sons of John Duke of Rutland, by Bridget late Dutchess of Rutland, and their respective Children, Progeny, and Issue, to take and use the Surname of Sutton, pursuant to the Will of Robert Lord Lexington, deceased, and in such Manner as is therein mentioned.
- Citation: 8 Geo. 2. c. 2 Pr.
- Territorial extent: Great Britain

Dates
- Royal assent: 24 March 1735
- Commencement: 14 January 1735 (Note: Start of session.)

Status: Current legislation

Tylney, born John Child, was baptised on 22 October 1712. He was the third son of Richard Child, 1st Earl Tylney, and Dorothy, daughter of John Glynne of Henley Park, Surrey. Dorothy Glynne's mother was the heiress Dorothy Tylney whose father was Frederick Tylney of Tylney Hall. Due to the inheritance, Richard Child and his sons all adopted the surname of Tylney in 1734, by private act of Parliament, the Younger Sons of the Duke of Rutland's Names Act 1734 (8 Geo. 2. c. 2 Pr.).

John Child was educated at Westminster School in 1721 and later at Christ Church in Oxford. At the 1734 general election, his father stood down from his seat at Essex in his favour, but he was not elected. In 1750, John Child, now John Tylney became the Earl of Tylney and inherited Wanstead House, where he lived. At the 1761 general election, he was returned as Member of Parliament for Malmesbury. In February 1764, Tylney was in Florence, and later he settled in Naples.

In 1765, he was a larger seated figure included in a caricature painting by Thomas Patch. Patch was another Englishman living abroad and he had left Rome for Florence after he had been banished for a scandal based on his homosexuality.

Tylney died on 17 September 1784 in Naples. His heir was his nephew, James Tylney-Long.

== Gallery ==
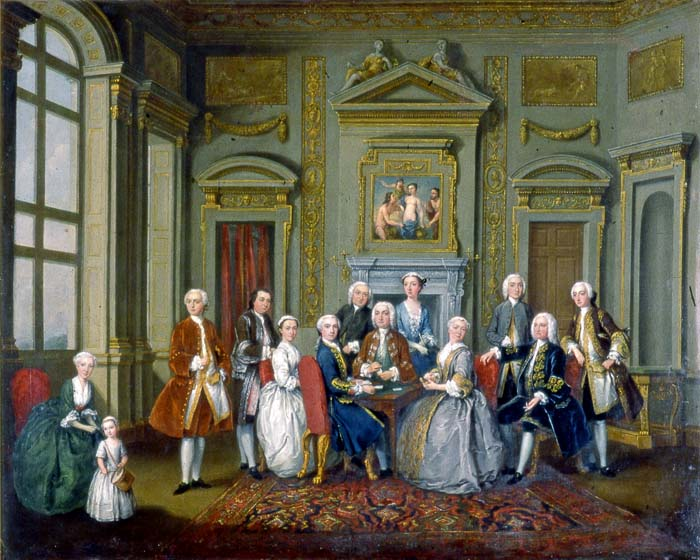
The Tylney Family in the Saloon at Wanstead by Old Nollekens, 1740. The Earl is seated at right, attended by his son John, right; his wife sits at the table opposite 3rd son Lt. Josiah RN, whilst a daughter in blue stands behind. To the left is the infant James Long, with father Sir Robert Long looking on (coll. Fairfax House, York, CT198.327).

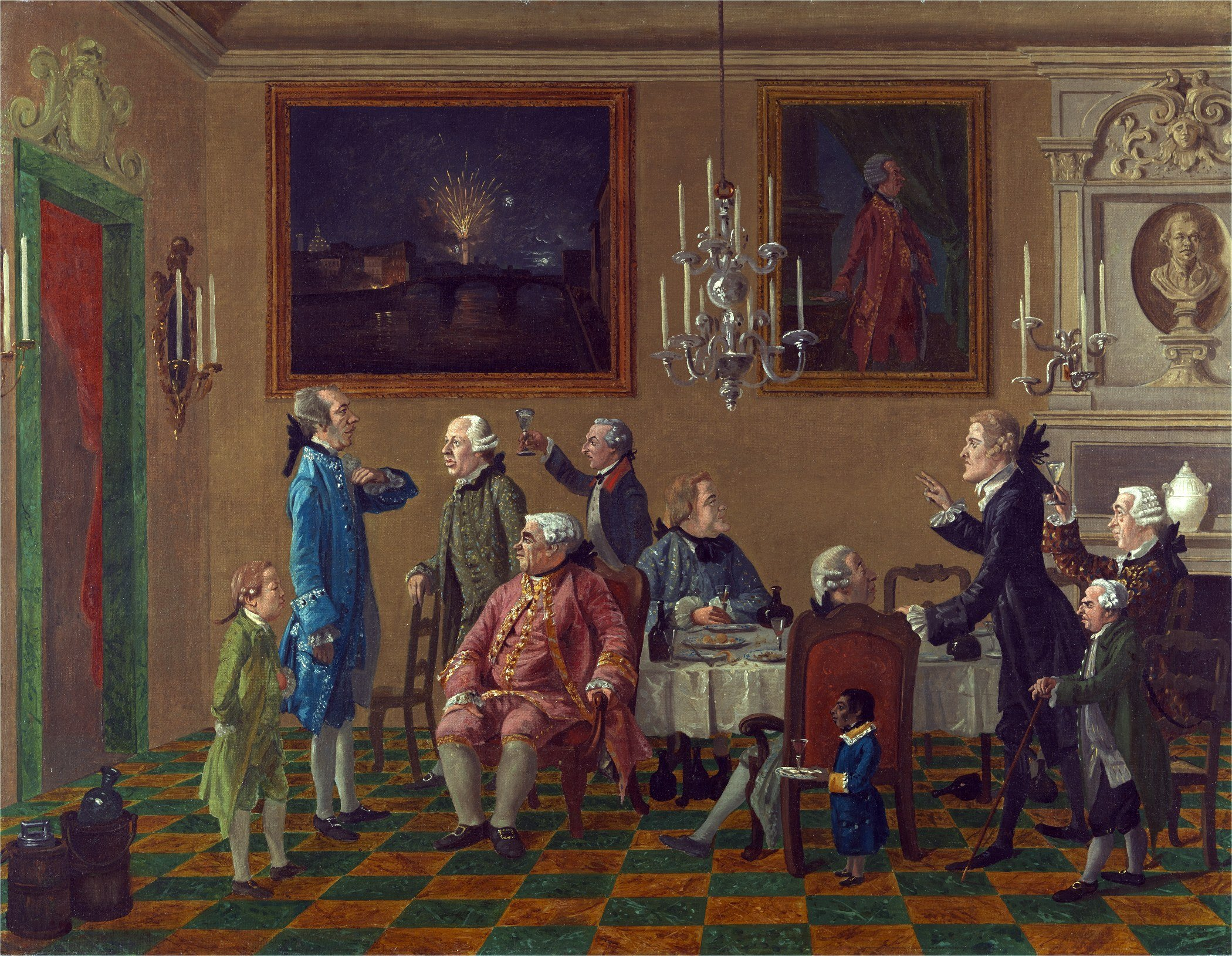
British Gentlemen at Sir Horace Mann's's Home in Florence (circa 1765), including John Tylney, 2nd Earl Tylney, by Thomas Patch; Yale Center for British Art, Paul Mellon Collection

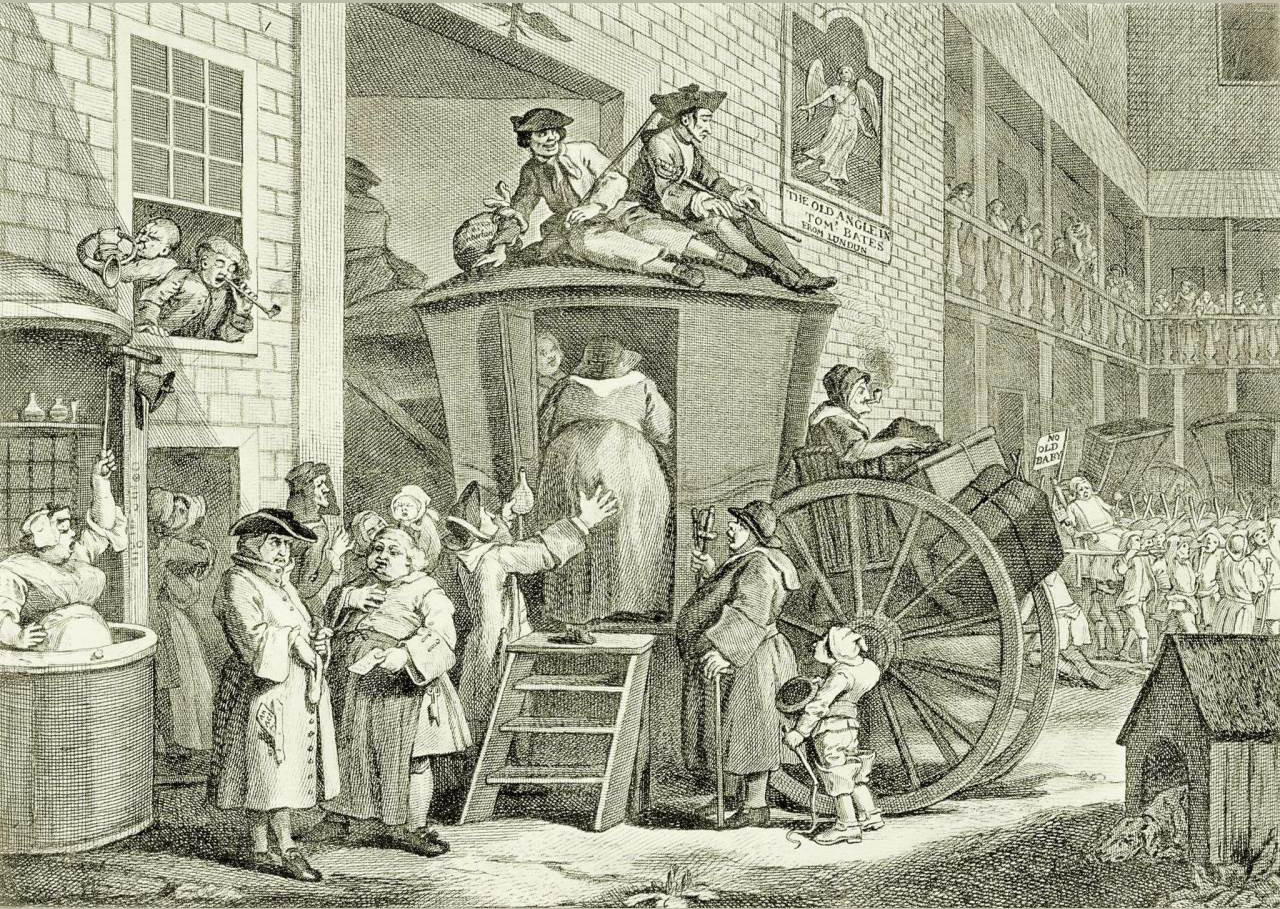
Print by Hogarth showing the Angel Inn, Islington; a rowdy crowd hold up a sign saying "No Old Baby," an anti-Tylney slogan used when he stood in Essex in 1734.

== Notes ==
Parliament of Great Britain
Preceded by Brice Fisher; Thomas Conolly	Member of Parliament for Malmesbury; 1761–1768; With: Thomas Conolly	Succeeded by Hon. Thomas Howard; The Earl of Donegall
Peerage of Ireland
Preceded by Richard Child	Earl Tylney; 1750–1784	Extinct
