= Wanstead Manor =

Wanstead Manor was a manor, historically in the English county of Essex and now in the London Borough of Redbridge. It centred on the manorhouse of Wanstead Hall, later demolished to build Wanstead House.

The manor is said to have been granted to the monks of Westminster Abbey in Saxon times by Abbot Aelfric, though this cannot be substantiated from any documentary evidence. However, the location was clearly a prized site on the east side of London. In 1086 the Domesday Book states that Wanstead Manor was held from the Bishop of London by one Ralph son of Brian. Wanstead was then densely wooded, being situated within the Forest of Essex. It was part of the forest bailiwick of Becontree during the Middle Ages and later of the Leyton "Walk".

== Sources ==
- "Wanstead House and the Parklands - a history". Wanstead Wildlife.
- Cornish, Alan. M.Sc. Wanstead Park - A Chronicle. (Originally published by the Friends of Wanstead Parklands in 1982, updated and republished by Wanstead Parklands Community Project in 2006.)
- Starkey, David. Henry: Virtuous Prince. London, 2008.
- Ramsey, Winston G. & Fowkes, Reginald L. Epping Forest: Then and Now. Battle of Britain Prints International Ltd., 1986.
