= Longe family =

House of Longe
- Noble house
- Country: Duchy of Normandy; Kingdom of England
- Founder: Raoul de Préaux (c.1100)
- Titles: Various
- Estates: Gisborough Hall; Dunston Hall; Spixworth Park; Rood Ashton House; Markwell Hall; Benham Park; Mornington House; Hingham Hall; South Wraxall Manor; Abbot's Hall; Dangan Castle; Reymerston Hall; Yelverton Hall

Longe (/ˈlɒŋ/; Old Norman: le Longe or le Long) is a surname of Anglo-Norman origin. The name Longe derives from the Anglo-Norman French ‘Lung’ or ‘Lang’ for tall or high. The family descend from the noble family of de Préaux who were barons in Préaux, Roumois and Darnétal, Normandy. Variants of the name include: le Long, de Long, Le Lung, Longe, Long and Longue. The family are believed to have arrived in England following the Norman Conquest and during the early 13th century divided into two branches, the Wiltshire branch and the Norfolk branch. In the Hundred Rolls of 1273, early variations have been found including, Henry le Longe in Buckinghamshire, John le Longe in Huntingdonshire; and Walter le Longe in Shropshire.

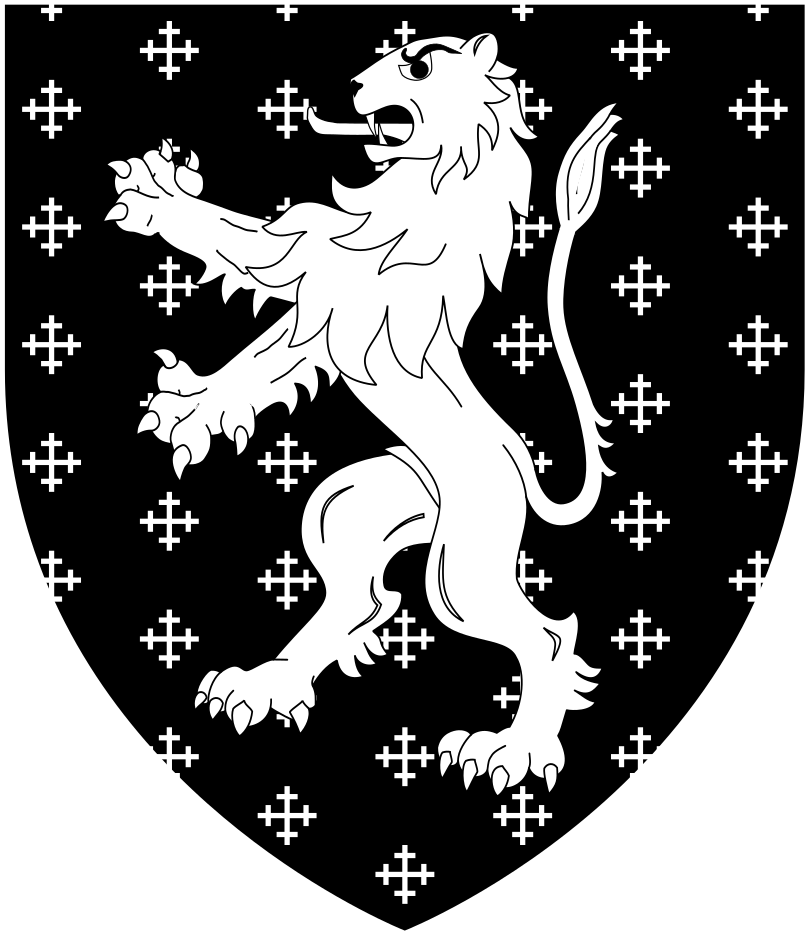
Sable semée of cross-crosslets, a lion rampant argent

== Longs of Wiltshire, England ==
The Wiltshire branch settled in the county prior to 1200. The founder, Robert I le Long, is descended from the de Préaux family who were barons in Préaux, Roumois and Darnétal, Normandy.

Lineage

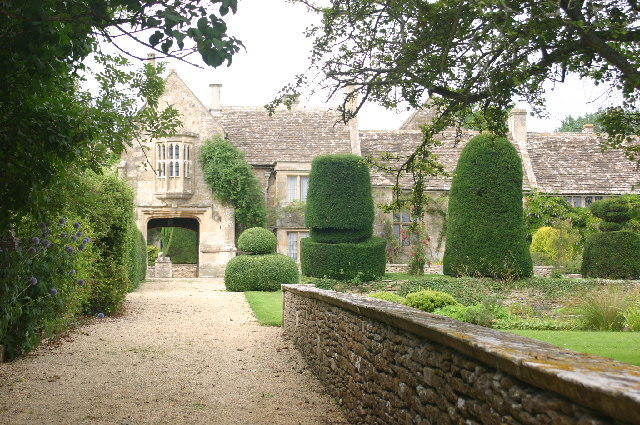
South Wraxall Manor, the house where the first tobacco was smoked in England, by Sir Walter Long and his friend Sir Walter Raleigh

1. Robert I le Long (1325–c.1370)
2. Robert II le Long (1350–1385) married N. de Berkeley of Beverston Castle, Gloucestershire.
3. Roger le Long (1370–1448) married Isabel Saint Maur, daughter of Roger de St. Maur of Penhow Castle, Monmouthshire.
4. Robert Longe (died 1447), a lawyer who bought the estates of Draycot Cerne and South Wraxall
5. John Long (1419–1478)
6. Sir Thomas Long (c.1451–1508)
7. Sir Henry Long (1489–1556)
8. Sir Robert Long (1517–1581)
9. Sir Walter Long (1560–1610)
10. Sir Robert Long, 1st Baronet (1600–1673)
11. Sir Walter Long (1594–1637)
12. Sir James Long, 2nd Baronet (1617–1692)
13. James Long (1652–1690)
14. Sir Robert Long, 3rd Baronet (1673–1692)
15. Sir Giles Long, 4th Baronet (1675–1698)
16. Sir James Long, 5th Baronet (1682–1729)
17. Sir Robert Long, 6th Baronet (1705–1767)
18. Sir James Tylney-Long, 7th Baronet (1736–1794)
19. Sir James Tylney-Long, 8th Baronet (1794–1805)

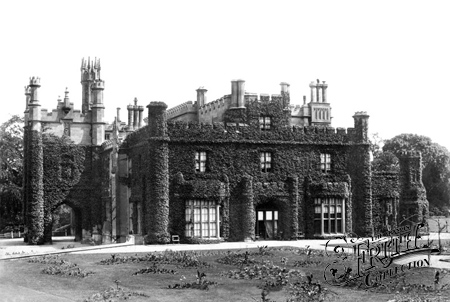
Rood Ashton House, Wiltshire, home of the Viscounts Long until 1930

High Sheriffs of Wiltshire

- 1322: Walter le Longe
- 1332: Gifford le Long
- 1483: Henry Long (died 1490), of Wraxall
- 1500: Sir Thomas Long of Draycot (c. 1451–1508) of South Wraxall and Draycot
- 1506: Sir Thomas Long of Draycot (c. 1451–1508) of South Wraxall and Draycot
- 1511: Henry Long, Kt of Draycot Cerne (1st term)
- 1525: Sir Henry Long, Kt of Draycot Cerne (2nd term)
- 1536: Sir Henry Long, Kt of Draycot Cerne (3rd term)
- 1541: Sir Henry Long, Kt of Draycot Cerne (4th term)
- 1574: Sir Robert Long of Wraxall and Draycott
- 1600: Sir Walter Long, Kt of South Wraxall and Draycot
- 1623: Gifford Long of Rowde Ashton
- 1627: Sir Walter Long, Bt of Whaddon
- 1644: Sir James Long, Bt, of Draycot Cerne
- 1653: Thomas Long, of Little Cheverell
- 1672: Sir Walter Long, Bt of Whaddon
- 1703: Richard Long of Collingbourne
- 1704: Walter Long of South Wraxall
- 1726: Henry Long, of Melksham
- 1745: Walter Long, of Salisbury, Wiltshire, and Preshaw, Hampshire
- 1764: Walter Long (of South Wraxall)
- 1794: Richard Godolphin Long, of Rood Ashton
- 1819: John Long, of Monkton Farleigh

Lord Lieutenants of Wiltshire

- Walter Long, 1st Viscount Long (3 March 1920 – 26 September 1924)

Deputy Lieutenants of Wiltshire

- Sir Walter Long (c. 1565–1610)
- Walter Long (1793–1867)
- Walter Hume Long, 1st Viscount Long (1854–1924)
- Richard Long, 3rd Viscount Long (1892–1967)

Notable descendants

- Anne Long
- Gifford Long
- Henry Long (died 1556)
- Henry Long (died 1490)
- John Long of Draycot Cerne
- Beeston Long
- Charles Edward Long
- Charlotte Long
- Edward Long
- Lislebone Long
- Richard Long (died 1730)
- Richard Long (died 1760)
- Richard Godolphin Long
- Richard Penruddocke Long
- Robert Ballard Long
- Samuel Long
- Walter Long (c. 1594 – 1637)
- Walter Long (1793 – 1867)
- Walter Long (British Army Officer)
- Walter Long (MP for Calne 1701)
- Walter Long (of South Wraxall)
- Walter Long (of Preshaw)
- William Long (surgeon)
- Richard Long (courtier)
- Robert Long (soldier)
- Thomas Long of Draycot

== Longes of Norfolk, England ==
The Norfolk branch settled in the county prior to 1299 with reference being made to both Robert le Longe and John le Longe who were traders of saltpetre in Norwich and the City of London. The family is descended from a Baron de Préaux in Normandy. Another branch settled in Suffolk in the 1300s with Walterus le Longe and Rogerus le Longe both mentioned as bailiffs in Dunwich, Suffolk in 1332 and 1333. In 1619, the Longe family purchased estates of Reymerston Hall and later Spixworth Hall in 1685 and Dunston Hall in 1859. In 1903, the Suffolk branch purchased Abbot's Hall in Stowmarket, Suffolk which is now the Museum of East Anglian Life. In 2011, the will of Thomas Longe of Ashwellthorpe was discovered, giving historians the first positive identification of a common soldier fighting for the House of York during the Battle of Bosworth.

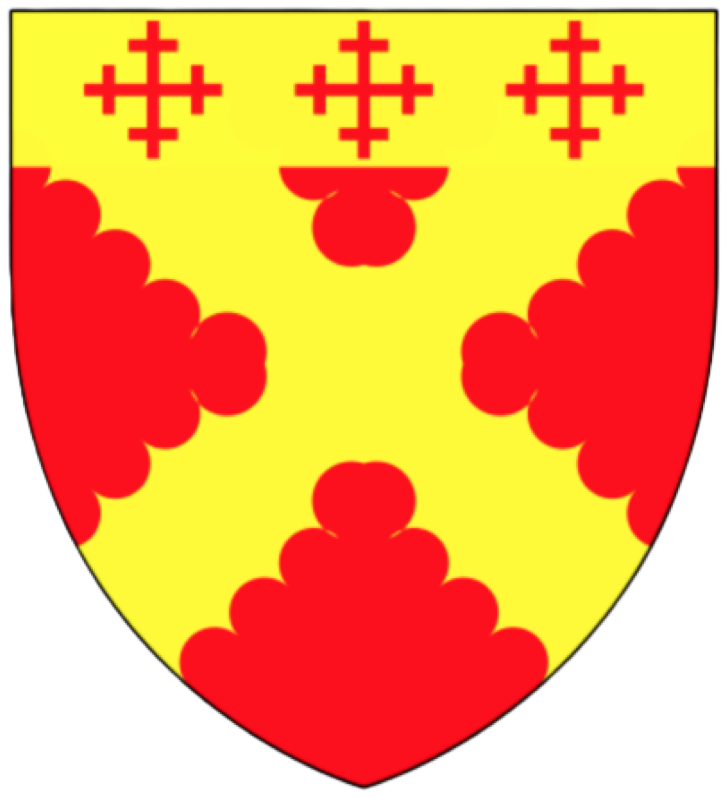
Arms of Longe of Spixworth Hall, Norfolk

High Sheriffs of Norfolk:

- 1641: Robert Longe (1588–1656), of Reymerston Hall.
- 1644: Robert Longe (1619–1688), of Foulden, Norfolk.
- 1752: Francis Longe (1726–1776), of Spixworth Hall.
- 1757: Israel Longe, of Dunston Hall.
- 1786: Francis Longe (1748–1812), of Spixworth Hall.
- 1975: Major Desmond Longe (1914–1990), of Woodton Grange, Norfolk.

High Sheriffs of Suffolk:

- 1984: Nicholas Longe of Grange Farm, Hasketon, Woodbridge.

Notable members:

- William of Wykeham (1324–1404), Bishop of Winchester and Chancellor of England.
- John Longe (1549–1589), Archbishop of Armagh and member of the Privy Council of Ireland.
- Rev John Longe (1765–1834) of Spixworth Hall, Vicar of Coddenham and diarist.
- Francis Davy Longe (1831–1905), of Spixworth Hall, First-Class cricketer.

== Long baronets, of Whaddon (1661–1710) ==
The Long Baronetcy, of Whaddon in the County of Wiltshire, was created in the Baronetage of England on 26 March 1661 for the politician Walter Long. He was succeeded by his son, the second Baronet. He was unmarried and the title became extinct on his death in 1710.

- Sir Walter Long, 1st Baronet
- Sir Walter Long, 2nd Baronet

== Tylney-Long baronets, of Westminster (1662–1794) ==
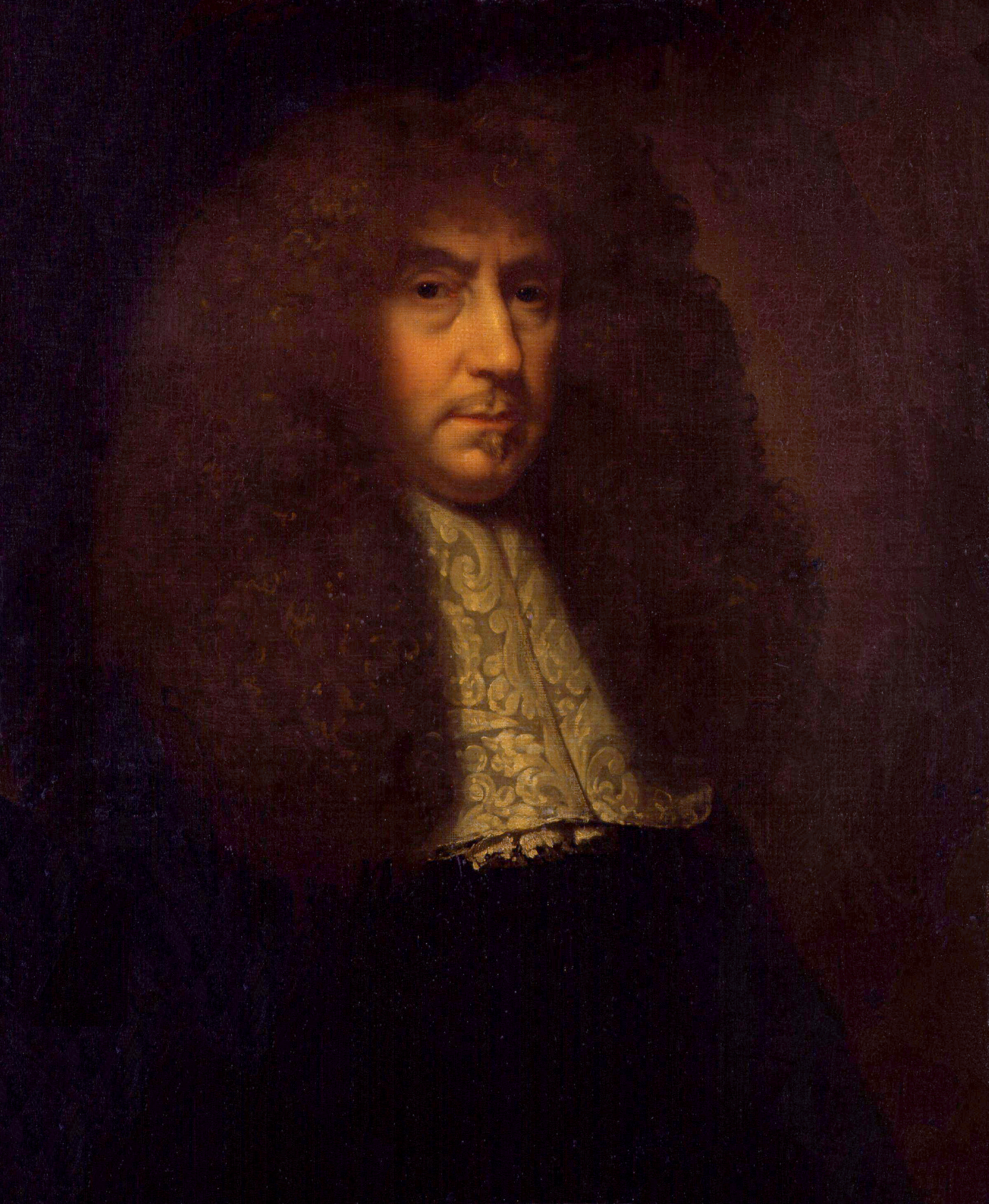
Sir Robert Long, 1st Baronet

The Long, later Tylney-Long Baronetcy, of Westminster in the County of London, was a title in the Baronetage of England. It was created in 1662 for Robert Long, with remainder in default of male issue of his own to his nephew James Long and the heirs male of his body. He was the son of Sir Walter Long. Long never married and was succeeded according to the special remainder by his nephew, James, the second Baronet. He was the son of Sir Walter Long. Three of Sir James's grandsons, the third, fourth and fifth Baronets, all succeeded in the title. The latter represented several constituencies in the House of Commons. He married Lady Emma, daughter of Richard Tylney, 1st Earl Tylney (see Earl Tylney). Their son, the sixth Baronet, succeeded to the substantial Tylney estates, including Wanstead Manor, on the death of his maternal uncle in 1784 and assumed the additional surname of Tylney. His only son, the eighth Baronet, died young in 1805 and the baronetcy became extinct.

Catherine Tylney-Long, daughter of the seventh Baronet and sister of the eighth and last Baronet, inherited the family estates. She married William Pole-Wellesley, 4th Earl of Mornington, who assumed the additional surnames of Tylney and Long. See Earl of Mornington for further history of this title.

- Sir Robert Long, 1st Baronet
- Sir James Long, 2nd Baronet
- Sir Richard Long, 3rd Baronet
- Sir Giles Long, 4th Baronet
- Sir James Long, 5th Baronet
- Sir Robert Long, 6th Baronet
- Sir James Tylney-Long, 7th Baronet
- Sir James Tylney-Long, 8th Baronet

== Earls of Mornington (1760; reverted) ==
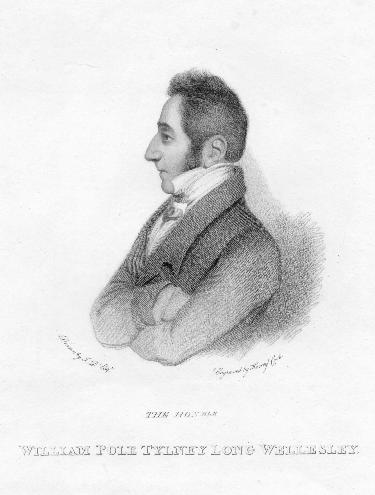
William Pole-Tylney-Long-Wellesley, 4th Earl of Mornington

Catherine Tylney-Long, daughter of the seventh Baronet (see Tylney-Long baronets) and sister of the eighth and last Baronet, inherited the family estates. She married William Pole-Wellesley, 4th Earl of Mornington, who assumed the additional surnames of Tylney and Long.

The 4th Earl of Mornington's wife was known in fashionable London society as "The Wiltshire Heiress", as she was believed to be the richest commoner in England. Her estates in Essex, Hampshire and Wiltshire were said to be worth £40,000 per year in rents (£3,500,000 in 2016). She also had financial investments in hand worth £300,000 (£28,000,000 in 2016) and had been sought in marriage by the Duke of Clarence, later King William IV. See Earl of Mornington for further history of this title.

- William Pole-Tylney-Long-Wellesley, 4th Earl of Mornington
- William Pole-Tylney-Long-Wellesley, 5th Earl of Mornington

== Barons Farnborough; first creation (1826–1838) ==
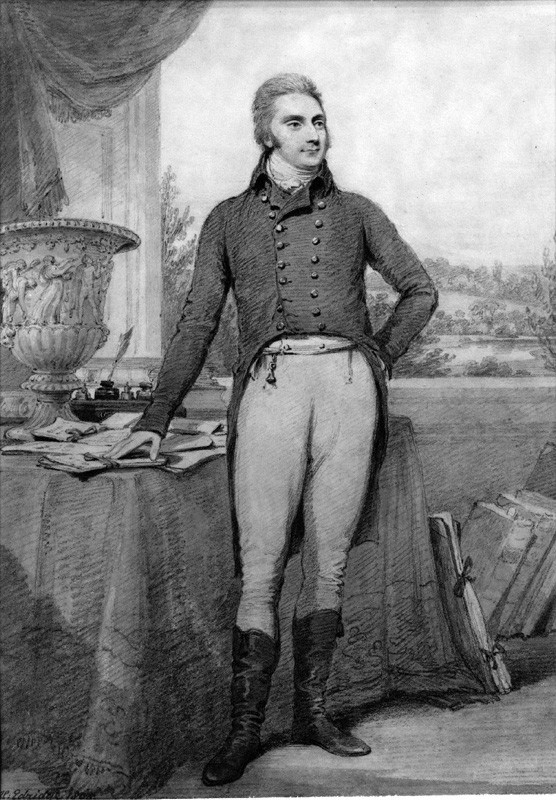
The Right Honourable The Lord Farnborough

In 1820 King George IV appointed Charles Longe Knight of the Order of the Bath and on his retirement from political life in 1826 he was raised to the peerage as Baron Farnborough, of Bromley-Hill-Place, in the county of Kent. Long was elected FRS in 1792, FSA in 1812, and was given an honorary LLD by Cambridge University in 1833 where he had studied at Emmanuel College, Cambridge, matriculating in 1779; at Cambridge he was a friend of William Pitt.

- Charles Long, 1st Baron Farnborough

== Barons Gisborough (1917–) ==
Baron Gisborough, of Cleveland in the County of York, is a title in the Peerage of the United Kingdom, created in 1917 for the Conservative politician Richard Chaloner (1856–1938).

== Viscounts Long, of Wraxall (1921–) ==
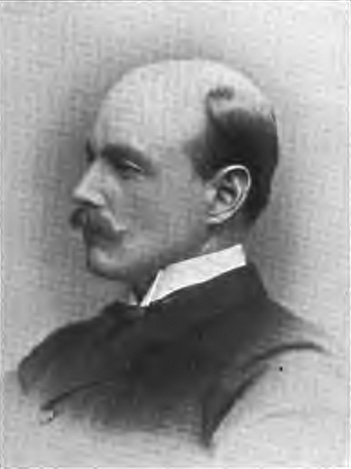
Walter Long, 1st Viscount Long

Viscount Long, of Wraxall in the County of Wiltshire, is a title in the Peerage of the United Kingdom. It was created in 1921 for the Conservative politician Walter Long, who had previously served as Member of Parliament, President of the Board of Agriculture, President of the Local Government Board, Secretary of State for the Colonies and First Lord of the Admiralty.

His grandson, the second Viscount (son of Brigadier General Walter Long) was killed in action in the Second World War. He was succeeded by his uncle, the third Viscount. He had earlier represented Westbury in Parliament as a Conservative.

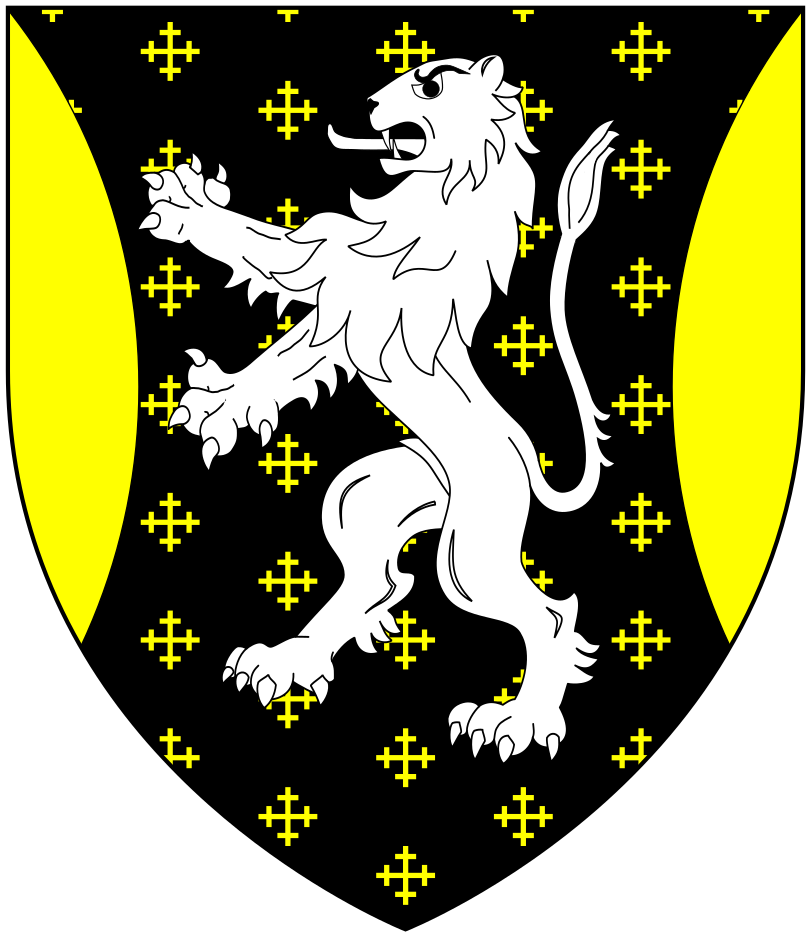
Arms of Viscount Long

As of 2012 the title is held by his son, the fourth Viscount. He served as a government whip from 1979 to 1997 in the Conservative administrations of Margaret Thatcher and John Major. However, Lord Long lost his seat in the House of Lords after the passing of the House of Lords Act 1999.

- Walter Long, 1st Viscount Long
- Walter Long, 2nd Viscount Long
- Richard Long, 3rd Viscount Long
- Richard Long, 4th Viscount Long
- James Long, 5th Viscount Long.

== Arms of the Longe family ==
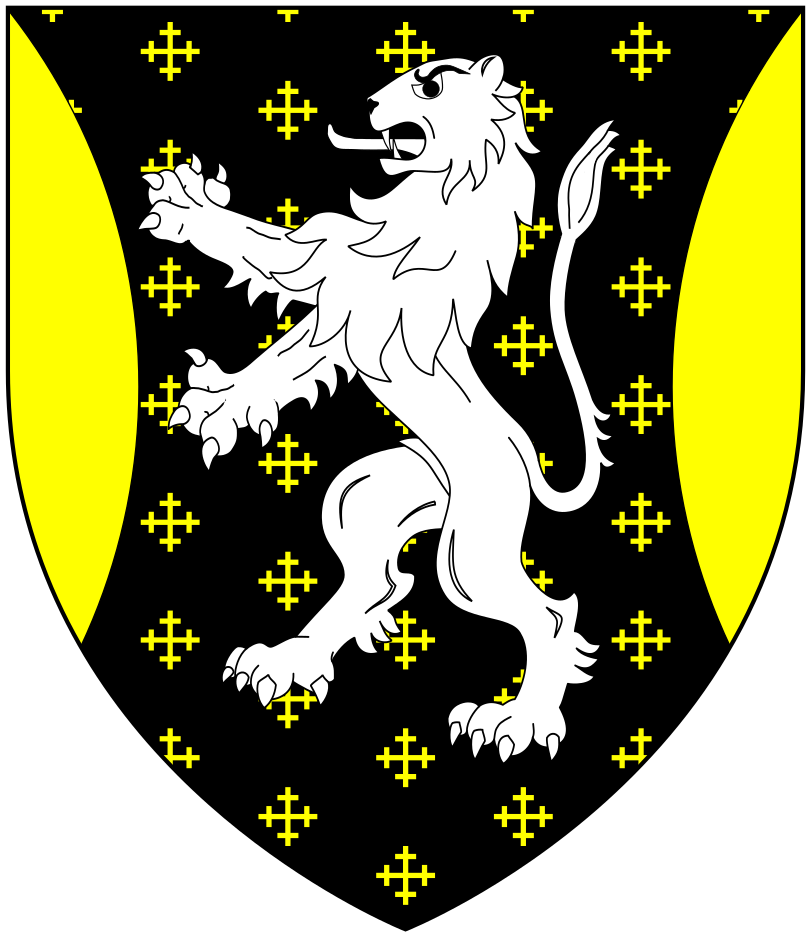
Arms of Viscount Long
Sable, semée of Crosses-Crosslet Or, a Lion rampant Argent, between two Flaunches Or

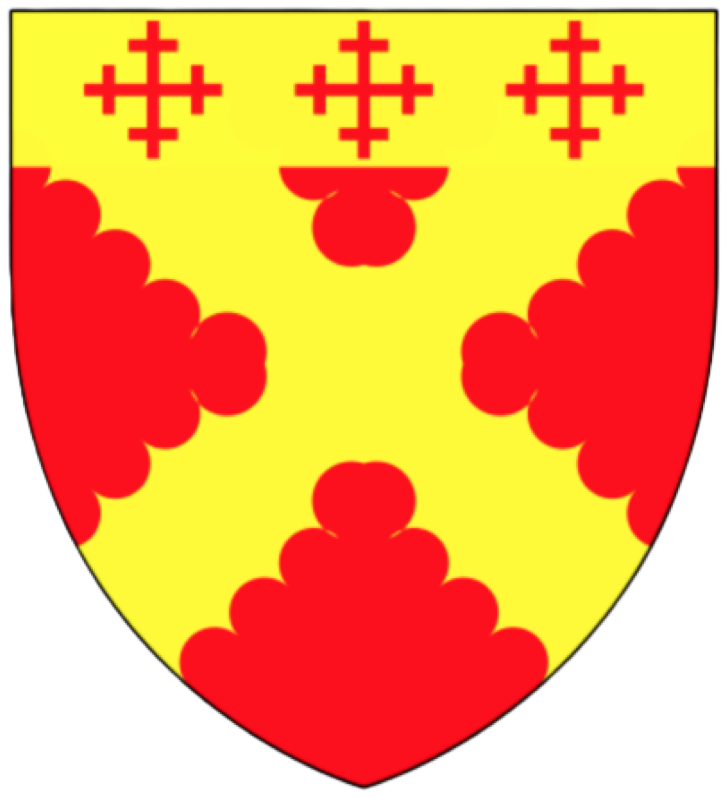
Arms of Longe of Spixworth Hall, Norfolk
Gules, a saltire engrailed or, on a chief of the second three cross-crosslets of the first

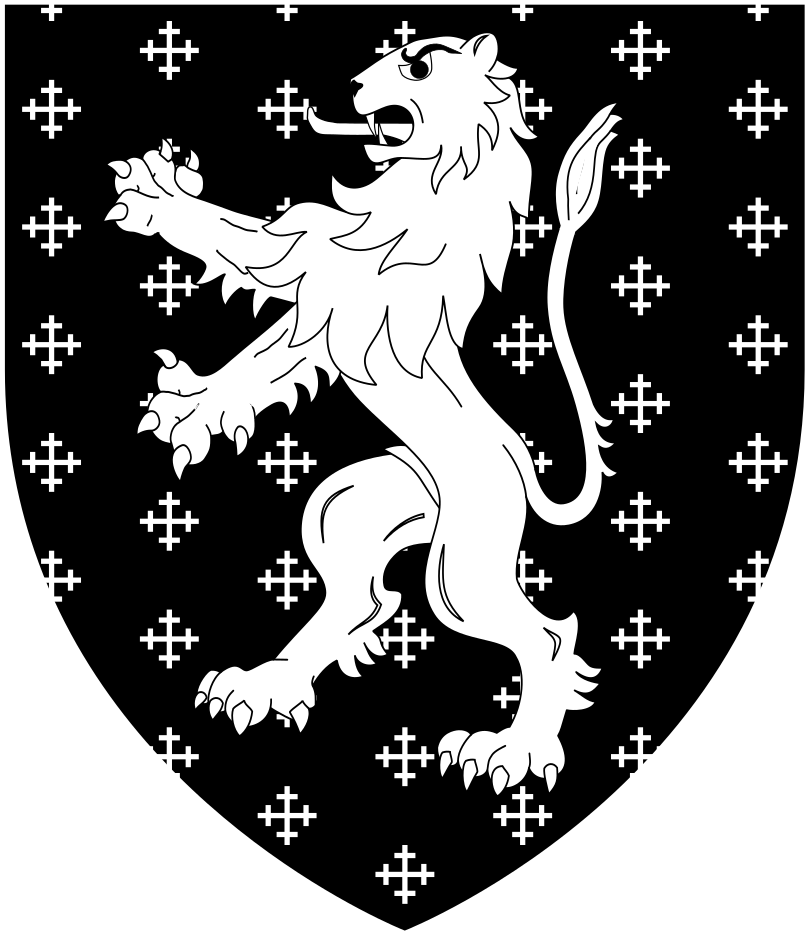
Arms of Long of South Wraxall, Wiltshire
Sable semée of cross-crosslets, a lion rampant argent
