= Walter Long =

Walter Long may refer to:

- Walter Long (1560/65–1610), English knight of South Wraxall and Draycot, Wiltshire, friend of Sir Walter Raleigh
- Walter Long (c. 1594–1637), his son, English knight of Wiltshire
- Sir Walter Long, 1st Baronet of Whaddon (c. 1603–1672), English MP for Ludgershal, prosecuted in the Star Chamber and imprisoned in the Tower of London
- Sir Walter Long, 2nd Baronet of Whaddon (1627–1710), his son, English MP for Bath
- Walter Long (MP 1701–02) (c. 1648–1731), English MP for Calne
- Walter Long (of Preshaw) (1788–1871), English landowner of Preshaw, Hampshire
- Walter Long (of South Wraxall) (c. 1712–1807), English Landowner of South Wraxall, Wiltshire
- Walter Long (1793–1867), English landowner of Rood Ashton, Wiltshire and MP for North Wiltshire
- Walter Long, 1st Viscount Long (1854–1924), British politician, MP, Secretary of State for the Colonies and First Lord of the Admiralty
- Walter Long (British Army officer) (1879–1917), his son, British officer in the First World War
- Walter Long, 2nd Viscount Long (1911–1944), his son, British peer and soldier
- Walter Long (actor) (1879–1952), United States character actor, starred in Laurel and Hardy films
- Walter Long (lieutenant) (1858–1892), British second lieutenant
- Walter K. Long (1904–1986), artist, historian and contributor to the Mount Rushmore monument
