= William Pole-Tylney-Long-Wellesley, 5th Earl of Mornington =

British nobleman (1813–1863)

William Richard Arthur Pole-Tylney-Long-Wellesley, 5th Earl of Mornington (7 October 1813 – 25 July 1863) was a British nobleman.

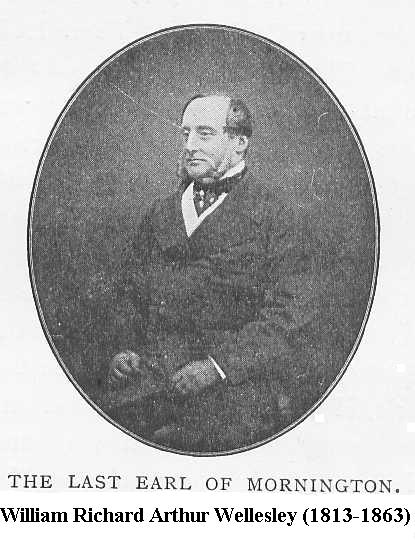
The 5th Earl was the last noble to bear the title as their most senior title; its successor was the 2nd Duke of Wellington and it would have devolved to the 1st Duke so will stay a secondary title of the Dukes, seldom if ever used, until the Dukedom becomes extinct.

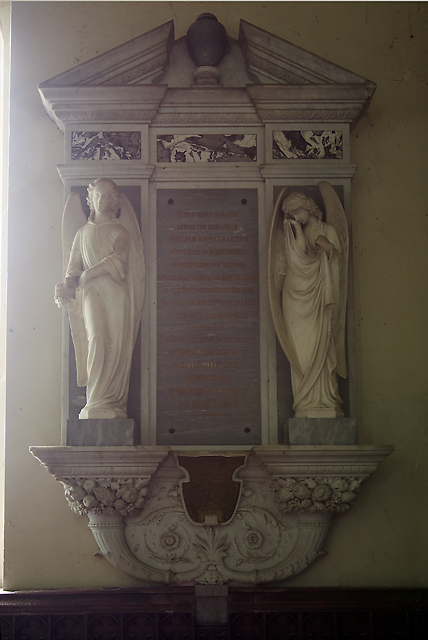
Wall monument to the Earl at the church of Draycot Cerne, by Triqueti

Long-Wellesley, the son of the notorious spendthrift William Pole-Tylney-Long-Wellesley (later fourth Earl of Mornington) and Catherine Tylney-Long (daughter of Sir James Tylney-Long, 7th Baronet), was born on 7 October 1813 at Wanstead House, at that time in Essex, but within the London borough of Redbridge since 1965.

His father's spending wreaked havoc on the family estate, but upon his mother's death in 1825, he inherited the remaining estates at Wanstead; Athelhampton, Devon; and Draycot Cerne, Wiltshire. Bitter, protracted custody litigation followed — his mother's sisters with temporary custody succeeded in placing him under the guardianship of the Duke of Wellington, his great-uncle.

In 1836 he took his father to court, after his father had sold furniture and pictures belonging to Draycot House to cover a £3,000 debt. These were passed out of a window after the sales agent was refused admission to the house. William junior maintained that these items belonged to him as heirlooms by the will of Sir James Long, 2nd Baronet.

His father succeeded as Earl of Mornington in 1845, after which William was styled Viscount Wellesley. In 1848, despite opposition from his father, he sold Athelhampton which had been purchased by Sir Robert Long, 1st Baronet, in 1665. He succeeded his father as Earl of Mornington on 1 July 1857.

Mornington died unmarried in Paris on 25 July 1863 from cancer of the tongue, and is buried at Draycot Cerne in Wiltshire. Having originally made his will bequeathing all his estates to his only sister Lady Victoria (who died unmarried in 1897), he made another will three weeks before his death, leaving all his landed property to his father's cousin 1st Earl Cowley, then ambassador at Paris. In dismay, Lady Victoria wrote to her cousin Walter Long of Rood Ashton House: "My wish would have been that after our own immediate heirs, all Long property should have returned to your family as the elder branch."

He was succeeded as 6th Earl of Mornington by his cousin, the 2nd Duke of Wellington.

== Sources ==
- Wiltshire Record Office, Cat. 947 Papers of Viscount Long
- Hand of Fate. The History of the Longs, Wellesleys and the Draycot Estate in Wiltshire. Tim Couzens 2001 OCLC 49204947
- The Lady Victoria Tylney Long Wellesley – A Memoir, Octavia Barry 1899

Peerage of Ireland
Preceded by William Pole-Tylney-Long-Wellesley	Earl of Mornington; 1857–1863	Succeeded by Arthur Wellesley
Peerage of the United Kingdom
Preceded by William Pole-Tylney-Long-Wellesley	Baron Maryborough; 1857–1863	Extinct
