= St James's Church, Draycot Cerne =

St James's Church
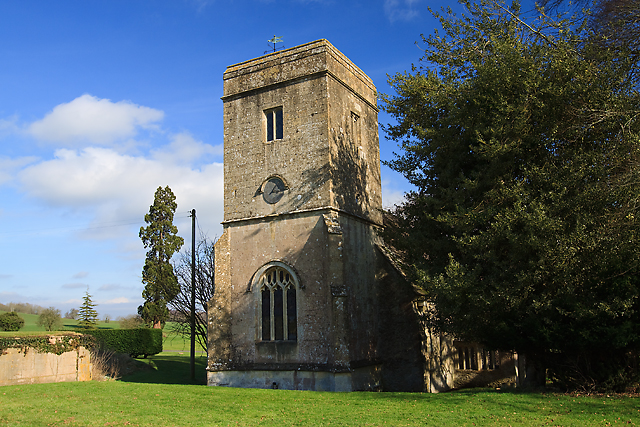

- Location within Wiltshire
- 51.5062°N 2.0949°W
- Location: Draycot Cerne, Sutton Benger, Wiltshire, England

History
- Built: c. 1300

Listed Building – Grade II*
- Official name: Church of St James
- Designated: 20 December 1960
- Reference no.: 1200500

St James's Church in Draycot Cerne, Sutton Benger, Wiltshire, England was built between 1260 and 1280. It is recorded in the National Heritage List for England as a Grade II* listed building, and is now a redundant church in the care of the Churches Conservation Trust. It was declared redundant on 1 June 1994, and was vested in the Trust on 17 May 1995.

The church stands in parkland near the site of Draycot House, a manor house demolished c. 1955.

The name of the church has been changed over the centuries. It was All Saints' in the later 12th century and St. Peter's in the 18th century; it has been St James since the later 19th century. The church has an Early English chancel which is lower than the floor of the 13th-century nave. The two-stage west tower dates from the 16th or 17th century and is supported by diagonal buttresses. The church was altered and restored in the 19th century.

There were wall paintings in the chancel in the 15th and 16th centuries. The interior includes a Gothic pulpit and box pews. There are also Victorian stained glass windows by Ward and Hughes and monuments including a Perpendicular tomb chest and a 13th-century knight's effigy, of either Phillip or John de Cerne. A memorial bust by Joseph Wilton to Sir Robert Long is set on a marble bracket designed by James Wyatt. The gothic painted tomb of Sir Thomas Long is within the church, along with tombs and memorials to members of the Long family. Some of the oldest tombs are to the de Cerne family from the 12th and 13th centuries. Sir Edward de Cerne is commemorated with a monumental brass on his tombstone. Henry of Cerne was the rector of the church in 1304.

== See also ==
- List of churches preserved by the Churches Conservation Trust in South West England
