= John Long (MP for Cricklade) =

Member of the Parliament of England (c.1419–1478)

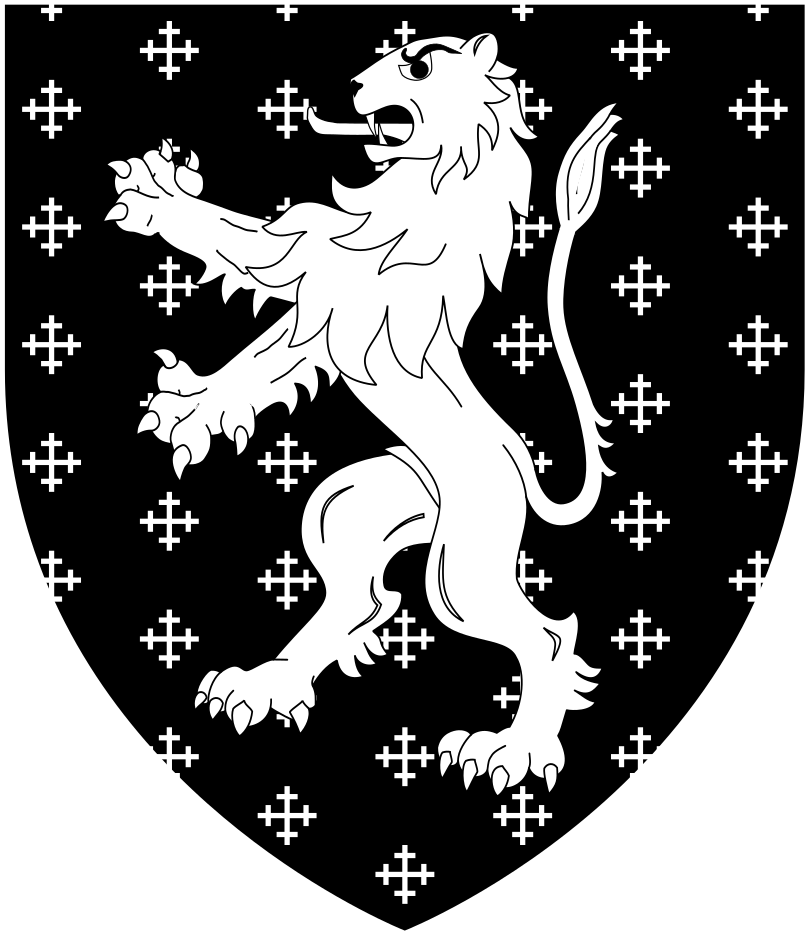
Arms of Long of South Wraxall and Draycot Cerne in Wiltshire: Sable semée of cross-crosslets, a lion rampant argent

John Long of Draycot Cerne (c. 1419 – 20 September 1478) was an English landowner and member of parliament.

Born in Wiltshire, the son of Robert Long and Margaret Godfrey, he was elected member of parliament for Cricklade in 1442 and in 1449 was an Elector for Wiltshire. He died on 20 September 1478 and is buried at Draycot Cerne, Wiltshire.

He married Margaret Wayte who, according to the printed Long family pedigree, was his half-sister. There were three sons from this marriage including Sir Thomas Long of Draycot, the other two sons being Henry and John.
