= Walter Long (died 1731) =

English politician

Walter Long JP (c. 1648 – 16 July 1731), of Bristol and South Wraxhall, Wiltshire, was an English politician who sat in the House of Commons in 1701.

Long was the son of Walter Long (c. 1623 – c. 1699) of Bristol and South Wraxhall and his wife Barbara Brayfield. He matriculated at Trinity College, Oxford on 1 April 1664, aged 15. He inherited the Wraxhall estate from his father in 1699.

Long's Wiltshire property meant he could put himself forward as a candidate at Calne at the first general election of 1701, when he was returned as member of parliament in a contest. He was probably supported by Henry Blaake, an outgoing member. He was inactive in the House and on 10 May he was granted leave of absence for an unspecified period. At the second general election in November 1701, he withdrew when Blaake stood again as a candidate. He was High Sheriff of Wiltshire for the year 1703 to 1704.

Long's grandfather John Long (c. 1585 – 1636) was disinherited by his father, Sir Walter Long (1565–1610) of South Wraxall and Whaddon, by the contrivances of the latter's second wife Catherine née Thynne (a daughter of the first Sir John Thynne of Longleat) but a compromise later led John to receiving South Wraxall, and his brother the manor of Draycot. South Wraxall eventually passed to Walter Long, who died unmarried on 16 July 1731. He is buried at South Wraxall, near Bradford-on-Avon, Wiltshire. He left all his property in Somerset, Wiltshire and Gloucestershire to John Long, a nephew of his cousin Hope Long.

== Bibliography ==
- Beatson, Robert, A Chronological Register of Both Houses of the British Parliament, 1807
- Luttrell, Narcissus, A Brief Historical Relation of State Affairs, from September 1678 to April 1714, 1857

Parliament of Great Britain
Preceded by Henry Blaake; Henry Chivers	Member of Parliament for Calne; 1701; With: Walter Hungerford	Succeeded by Henry Blaake; Edward Bayntun
