= James Montagu (died 1748) =

English coal owner and Member of Parliament

James Montagu (c.1687 – 30 October 1748) was an English coal owner and Member of Parliament.

James Montagu was born around 1687, the only child of Charles Montagu and Elizabeth Forster. He was the grandson of Edward Montagu, 1st Earl of Sandwich. He was educated under a Mr Cox, before being admitted to Trinity College, Cambridge on 28 June 1702, aged 14.

Montagu was elected to represent Chippenham in the 1708 British general election. Sitting as a Whig, he voted for the naturalization of the Palatines in 1709 and for the impeachment of Henry Sacheverell in 1710. He lost his seat in the 1710 election, but was elected to sit for Camelford five years later. Outside of parliament, he was he played an active role in the coal industry with his father, and was described by Sir Henry Liddell in 1711 as "the greatest owner in our day."

Montagu gained a considerable inheritance in 1721 due to the death of his father followed by that of his great uncle Nathaniel Crew, Bishop of Durham. It was around the latter's estate of Newbold Verdon that he decided to consolidate his holdings, selling his interests in the manors of Spindlestone and Budle and his father's estate at Belford for a total of £19,500, equivalent to £3,630,000 in 2025.

Unsuccessful in an attempt to stand for Durham in 1722 and growing increasingly deaf, he retired to Newbold Verdon Hall and devoted his time to improving the estate. He died during a visit to London on 30 October 1748.

Montagu married twice. His first wife, Mary, died at some point after 1729. On 5 April 1736 he married Penelope, daughter of George Hewett and widow of Sir William Chester, 5th baronet. He had no children with either, and his estate was inherited mostly by his cousin Edward Wortley Montagu after his death.

Parliament of England
Preceded by Viscount Mordaunt; Sir James Long	Member of Parliament for Chippenham; 1708–1710; With: Sir James Long	Succeeded by Joseph Ashe; Sir James Long
Preceded by Sir Bourchier Wrey; James Nicholls	Member of Parliament for Camelford; 1715–1722; With: Richard Coffin	Succeeded by The Earl of Drogheda; William Sloper
