= Newbold Verdon Hall =

Country house in Leicestershire, England

- Interactive map of the Newbold Verdon Hall area

General information
- Type: Country House
- Location: Newbold Verdon, Leicestershire
- Coordinates: 52.6303°N 1.3481°W
- Completed: c.1700

Technical details
- Material: Brick with tiled roof

Design and construction
- Designations: Grade I listed

Newbold Verdon Hall was an 18th-century country house, later a farmhouse, in the village of Newbold Verdon, Leicestershire, England. It is a Grade I listed building.

The house was built for Nathaniel Crew, 3rd Baron Crew, Bishop of Durham, but has been modified and extended several times since then. It is constructed of brick with ashlar dressings and has a large, hipped, plain tiled roof with a flat top. It is built to a 2-storey double pile plan of 5 by 3 bays with a basement and attic. It is approached from the end of the village main street through a forecourt with 3 pavilions (formerly 4) in the corners and was originally surrounded by a wide moat.

== History ==
Sir Thomas Crewe, Speaker of the House of Commons, had purchased the estate in 1625, after which it was passed down to Nathaniel Crew, who died in 1721 with no children. He left the estate to his great-nephew James Montagu, MP for Chippenham and Camelford.

James made many improvements to the house and grounds. On his death in 1748 the property passed to his cousin, the diplomat Sir Edward Wortley-Montagu, MP of Wortley Hall, Yorkshire. He died in 1761 and his wife, the celebrated writer Lady Mary Wortley Montagu, a year later, left Newbold Verdon (but no money) to their errant son, the traveller Edward Wortley Montagu. He sold the house in 1767 to pay his gambling debts and moved to live in the Middle East. The house was afterwards owned by the Cradock-Hartopp family until the 20th century.

By the 19th century, however, the building was being used as a rented farmhouse and renamed Hall Farm. In 1965 it belonged in turn to Mr. J.G. Selkirk and his son Ian.
