= Henry Long (died 1556) =

Kingdom of England politician

Sir Henry Long (ca. 1489–1556) was born in Wiltshire, the eldest surviving son and heir of Sir Thomas Long of Draycot, landowner, of Draycot Cerne in Wiltshire.

== Political career ==
Long was appointed High Sheriff of Wiltshire in 1512, 1526, 1536 and 1542, and High Sheriff of Somerset and Dorset in 1538. He replaced Sir Edward Darrell when the latter died as Member of Parliament for Wiltshire in 1532, and was re-elected in 1552. He was also Hereditary Bailiff of Charlton Wood and Keeper of Braden Forest, east of Malmesbury. Together with his brother Richard, he was present at the baptism of Prince Edward. He inherited the manor of Stock & Stockley from his father and later purchased the manor of South Wraxall.

In 1513 he was on campaign in France and was knighted for making a gallant charge at Therouenne, Picardy in the sight of the King, for which he was granted a new crest, consisting of a lions head with a man's hand in its mouth. In 1520 he accompanied Henry VIII with other knights to the meeting with Francis I of France at the Field of the Cloth of Gold.

In 1544 Long was at the Siege of Boulogne, having the command of 200 men, whom he raised for that expedition. His Captain was severely wounded in an unsuccessful attack on the castle on 1 September 1544.

Long's close relationship with Henry VIII paid dividends at the Dissolution of the Monasteries, with grants of land in Wiltshire; Lyneham and Littlecote in Hilmarton, together with the rectory, great tithes and advowson of the vicarage of Lyneham, all formerly belonging to Bradenstoke Priory. He leased the manor of Vastern (or Fasterne) from Katherine Parr who, after the death of her husband Henry VIII, had remarried Sir Thomas Seymour, brother of Protector Somerset. The Protector coveted Vastern, and negotiated with Sir Henry Long to resign his lease. When she heard of this, Katherine was highly indignant. She was not on good terms with the Protector because he had declined to give her some valuable jewels which, as she maintained, King Henry had given her for her own. She vowed she would stop the Protector getting his hands on the Vastern lease, and would go herself "tomorrow, Saturday, at three o’clock" to the young King Edward, and give full utterance to her feelings against the Protector, his uncle. But the formidable uncle-Protector of the realm was not to be meddled with. Whether she kept her promise, and how far she succeeded in getting the diamonds, is not clear, but Somerset succeeded in acquiring Vastern; Sir Henry Long somewhat unwillingly parted with it for a sum of money and the office of Ranger of Braden Forest for his lifetime.

== Personal life ==
Long married firstly, Jane (or Frydeswyde), daughter of Sir John Hungerford and Margaret Blount. He married secondly, Eleanor, daughter of Sir Richard Wrottesley and Dorothy Sutton. He had several children with both his wives, including Sir Robert Long. Sir Henry Long died 8 October 1556 and is buried at Draycot in Wiltshire. His second wife died about 1543.

== References and further reading ==
- Nicol, Cheryl (2016). Inheriting the Earth: The Long Family's 500 Year Reign in Wiltshire. Hobnob Press. ISBN 1906978379.

== Sources ==
- Gage, John, The History and Antiquities of Hengrave in Suffolk (1822)
- Gentleman's Magazine
