= William Long (surgeon) =

English surgeon (1747–1818)

William Long FRS, FSA (16 June 1747 – 24 March 1818) was an English surgeon.

Born in Salisbury, Wiltshire, he was the youngest of ten children of Walter Long of Preshaw, Hampshire (1690–1769) (not to be confused with William's nephew Walter Long of Preshaw), and Philippa Blackall. He was eminent in his profession, and for thirty-three years, from 1784 to 1807, was surgeon at St Bartholomew's Hospital in London. He was appointed Master of the Royal College of Surgeons in 1800 and was among those who gave a donation to help fund their new surgical library. He was also on the College's list of first Governors, first Examiners of Surgeons and the first Court of Assistants. He wrote several papers, including one (unpublished) entitled "The Effects of Cancer".

He lived in London's Chancery Lane, and later at Lincoln's Inn Fields, and developed close friendships with the painter George Romney, sculptor John Flaxman, and writers William Hayley, Isaac Reed and William Blake, who, like Long, were members of the Unincreasable Club, at nearby Queens Head, Holborn, London. Long sat for Romney as his first subject for a portrait which was done for his friend Hayley. Subsequently, Long acquired many of Romney's paintings, which were sold by Christie's on behalf of the family in 1890.

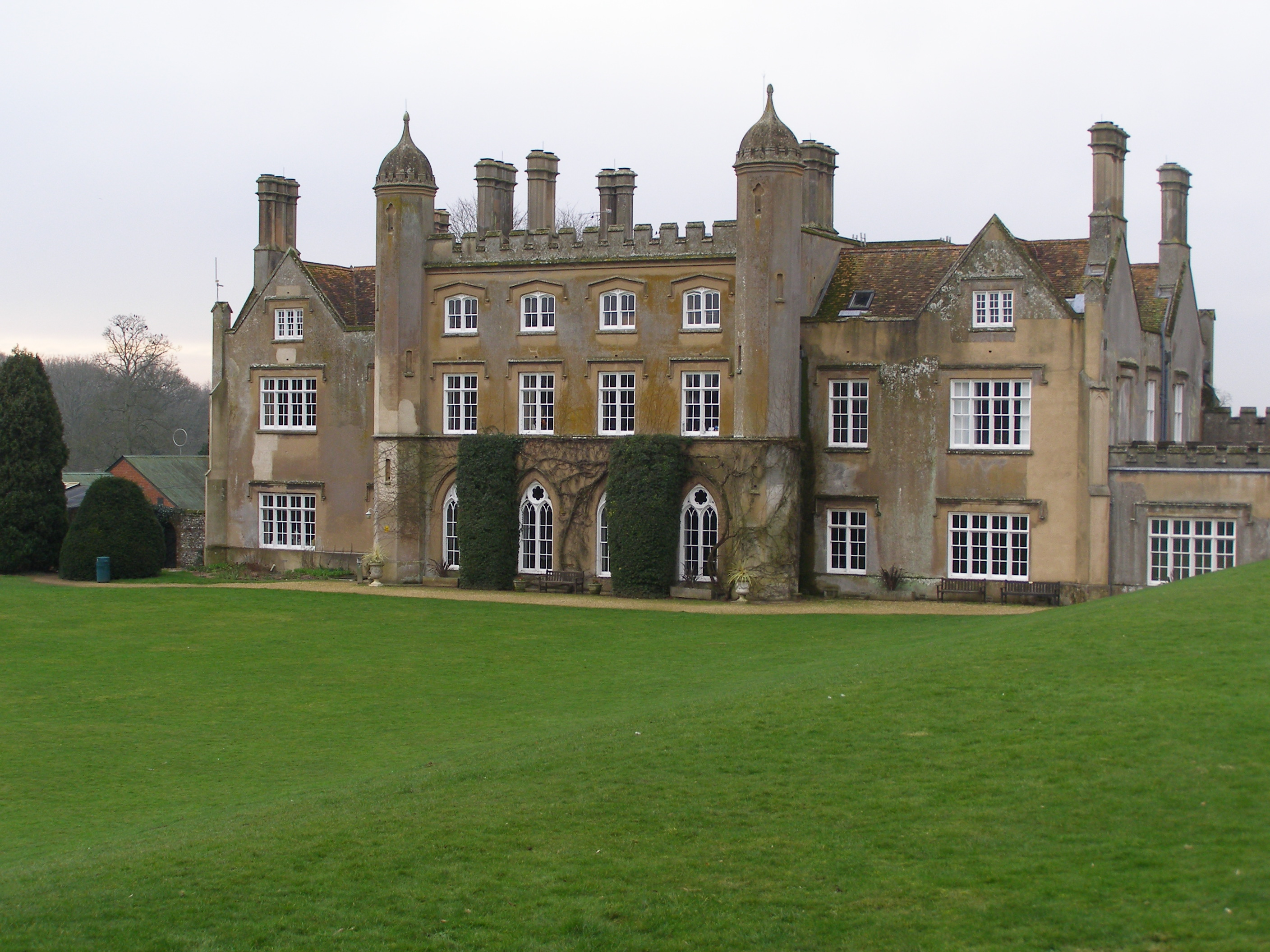
Marwell Hall

William Long purchased Marwell Hall near Winchester, Hampshire about 1798, and between 1812 and 1816 made considerable alterations, resulting in what is now the house as it stands today. He was a compassionate man, and when resident at his country seat away from London, he always gave his advice and medicine generously to the poor of the surrounding neighbourhood.

Long and his wife Alice (daughter of Edmund Dawson of Wharton, Lancaster) had no children, and in his will he made generous bequests to his nephews and nieces. After his death on 24 March 1818, his collections of preserved medical specimens and surgical instruments were donated by his executors to the Royal College of Surgeons Museum in London. Alice continued to live at Marwell Hall, and during the Owslebury riots of 1830 a mob of rioters, accompanied by John Boyes, a local farmer, arrived at the house. The mob demanded money from Alice, and John Boyce demanded a reduction in the rents of her farm tenants, so they could pay their agricultural labourers higher wages. (Afterwards 245 men were arrested and brought to trial at Winchester. Two of the prisoners were hanged and Boyes was transported to Tasmania for seven years but was pardoned and returned home in 1835).

William Long is buried in Salisbury Cathedral and his widow erected a monument to 'perpetuate the memory of a much esteemed husband'. Part of the epitaph, written in Latin, says:

He improved the natural powers of the mind, by various extensive learning. To the poor in sickness, his advice, his skill, and his purse were ever open, and he administered to their wants with a most liberal hand. He added a suavity of manners, to a firmness of expression, which was at once perpicuous and convincing, steady in his friendship and inflexible integrity, he was warmly and firmly attached to his relations, no less by the bond of love and affection, than by the natural impulse of his heart and feelings.

Alice died 18 September 1840, leaving numerous charitable bequests.
