= Lomer (village) =

Medieval village

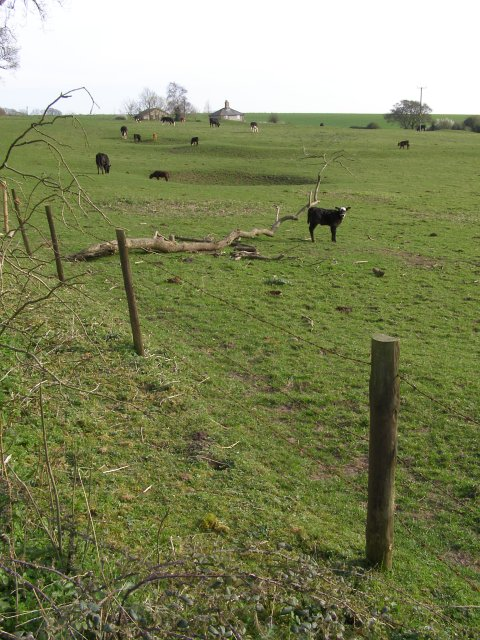
- The Chapel Yard field which contains the remains of the village and its church

- Location in Hampshire
- 51°00′25″N 1°09′22″W
- Periods: Medieval England
- Location: Hampshire, England
- OS grid reference: SU5930023400

Scheduled monument
- Reference no.: 1001797

Lomer was a medieval village in Hampshire, England which became depopulated in the 16th century as a result of enclosure. It lies 7 miles (11 km) south-east of Winchester on the South Downs.

== History ==
=== Pre-medieval ===
There is evidence of inhabitation dating to the early Iron Age. An urn decorated with fingernail impressions was discovered in a barrow near the site of the Lomer ruins, which was donated to the British Museum in 1873. Celtic fields can be seen in the area, and Roman pottery was found in a defensive earthwork which may have been constructed in the early Roman period.

=== Population and size ===
Lomer was recorded in the Domesday Book as being held by Ruald, for which he paid St. Peter's Abbey six sextaries of wine a year. Its inhabitants were Ruald's household, six villeins, three bordars, and two slaves. This suggests that approximately 50 inhabitants worked the land at the time of recording. Its value was recorded as three hides, meaning the land could support three families. A hide represented 120 acres on average, so Lomer may have been 360 acres. However, a hide was a measurement of value, not area, so the size of land deemed a hide was variable depending on its quality.

In the 1291 Taxatio Ecclesiastica, Lomer was evaluated as being worth £6 or 9 marks.

== Black Death and decline ==
Lomer did not apply for relief in 1352–53 following the Black Death, and a 1367 evaluation by Chancellor William of Wykeham saw Lomer re-evaluated at 9 marks—the same as in 1291. The subsidy roll shows that Lomer was paying slightly more tax in 1379 than in 1328, suggesting that it weathered the Black Death and subsequent outbreaks with no decline in population during this period.

In 1434, Parliament granted a tax remission of 2s to Lomer 'because of desolation wastes and destruction'. From 1489 to 1632, only 8s 10d (£404 in 2023) was paid of the 20s 2d tax (£928 in 2023) because there were not enough inhabitants to pay it. This was a possible factor in Lomer's lands being enclosed sometime in the late 15th century; by 1553, a fine of lands listed 1,000 acres of pasture between both Preshaw and Lomer, sold as one. Lomer's church was closed and its inventory merged with Corhampton parish in 1551 by royal order.

== Remains ==
The site is part of the Preshaw Estate. It is accessible along the South Downs Way, marked by a drinking water point. Its pond, ridge and furrow fields, raised platforms where the church and houses stood, and sunken remains of unpaved paths are still visible.
