= Sir James Long, 5th Baronet =

English landowner and Tory politician

Sir James Long, 5th Baronet (1682 – 16 March 1729) was an English landowner and Tory politician who sat in the English and British House of Commons between 1695 and 1729.

The son of James Long and his wife Susan Strangways, he was born at Athelhampton and baptised at Melbury House, Dorchester, Dorset in 1682. He was the grandson of Sir James Long, 2nd Baronet and brother of the celebrated Kit-Cat Club beauty Anne Long (c. 1681 – 1711). He succeeded to the baronetcy on the death of his brother Sir Giles Long, 4th Baronet, in 1698.

He married Henrietta Greville on 6 June 1702 at St Martin in the Fields, Westminster, London. She was the daughter of Fulke Greville, 5th Baron Brooke and his wife Sarah Dashwood, and a descendant of the Earl of Bedford. On the death of his grandmother Lady Dorothy Long in 1710, he inherited the Draycot estate in Wiltshire together with Athelhampton manor, other land in Wiltshire and Dorset, and an estate near Ripon in Yorkshire. He used the inheritance to purchase more land in Dorset, adjacent to Athelhampton, in the manors of Burleston and Southover.

Long was returned as Member of Parliament for Chippenham at the 1705 English general election and again in 1708 and 1710. At the 1715 British general election, he was returned as MP for Wootton Bassett. He did not stand at the 1722 general election but was returned as MP for Wiltshire in 1727.

Long died at his London residence in Jermyn Street on 16 March 1729 from apoplexy. There were four daughters and two sons from his marriage. Four of his six children survived him, including Robert who succeeded to the baronetcy. His daughter Susanna created a scandal by marrying her mother's gardener in 1732, as noted in his diary by Viscount Perceval (related distantly by marriage to the Longs). Lady Henrietta Long died 19 May 1765 at Bath.

Parliament of England
Preceded by Viscount Mordaunt; James Montagu	Member of Parliament for Chippenham; 1705–1707; Served alongside: Walter White 1705; Viscount Mordaunt 1705–1706	Succeeded by Parliament of Great Britain
Parliament of Great Britain
Preceded by Parliament of England	Member of Parliament for Chippenham; 1707–1713; Served alongside: Viscount Mordaunt 1707–1708; James Montagu 1708–1710; Joseph Ashe 1710–1711; Francis Popham 1711–1713	Succeeded by Sir John Eyles, Bt; John Norris
Preceded by Edmund Pleydell; Richard Cresswell	Member of Parliament for Wootton Bassett; 1715–1722; Served alongside: William Northey	Succeeded by Robert Murray; William Chetwynd
Preceded by Sir Richard Howe, Bt; Richard Goddard	Member of Parliament for Wiltshire; 1727–1729; Served alongside: John Ivory-Talbot	Succeeded by John Ivory-Talbot; John Howe
Baronetage of England
Preceded by Giles Long	Baronet (of Westminster); 1698–1729	Succeeded by Robert Long
