= Anne Long =

Anne Long (c. 1681 – 22 December 1711), was born at Draycot Cerne, Wiltshire, one of six children of James Long (died c. 1690) and his wife, Susanna, née Strangways. A celebrated beauty, she was the granddaughter of Sir James Long, 2nd Baronet, and of another leading civil war politician, Giles Strangways (1615–1675). She seems to have spent much of her childhood at her maternal grandparent's home at Melbury House, Dorchester, Dorset, probably due to her parents' unhappy marriage. Privately educated, she never married. Long was greatly admired by Jonathan Swift, although their relationship never had the same intensity as those Swift had with Esther Johnson and Esther Vanhomrigh.

== Kit-Cat Club ==
Anne Long became a well-known figure in London society, possibly as early as 1703. She became a toast of the Kit-Cat Club, and Thomas Wharton, 1st Marquess of Wharton had her name engraved on the club's drinking glasses:

Fill the glass; let Hautboys sound

Whilst bright Longy's health goes round

With eternal beauty blest

Ever blooming, still the best;

Drink your glass, and think the rest.

Her closest associate was the niece of Sir Isaac Newton, Catherine Barton (d. 1739), rumoured to be the mistress of Charles Montagu, 1st Earl of Halifax, and later wife of politician John Conduitt. Long first met Swift in 1707 at the London home of the Vanhomrighs, whom she described in her letters to Swift, as her cousins, although their exact family relationship is unclear. "A decree for concluding the treaty between Dr Swift and Mrs Long", was written by Swift in December 1707 or January 1708 and published by Edmund Curll in Letters, Poems and Tales: Amorous, Satyrical, and Gallant in 1718. Her position in society was financially sustained by debts contracted against an expected inheritance from her grandmother Lady Dorothy Long, née Leach, with whom she corresponded regularly, but Lady Long did not die until 1710.

== Mounting debts ==
In September of that year Swift wrote that there were 'bailiffs in her house' and Anne Long dissolved her household in Albemarle Street, London and fled to King's Lynn, Norfolk, to hold off her creditors, where she lived incognito near St Nicholas's Chapel and passed herself off as 'being of George Smyth's family of Nitly' (Correspondence of Jonathan Swift, 1.274). Her situation was not improved at her grandmother's death, as her brother Sir James Long, 5th Baronet, withheld her legacy.

Despite Anne Long's imprudence with money, Swift still held her in high regard. In his slowly and tortuously developing passion for Esther Vanhomrigh, his Vanessa, he even used her as a confidante. On one occasion, not wishing to openly offend Vanessa, he dropped a gentle hint about her behaviour by addressing a letter about her to Anne but sending it via Vanessa, conveniently forgetting to seal the enclosure; thus Vanessa would get to know what he thought about her but could not protest or remonstrate, since to do so she would have had to confess that she had read his private letter.

After her exile to King's Lynn, Anne, in her letters to Swift, enjoyed 'describing the rituals of provincial life and the mysterious figure that she cut there' (Nokes, 142). Swift turned against her only once, writing on 11 December 1710 that 'I had a letter from Mrs. Long, that has quite turned my stomach against her: no less than two nasty jests in it with dashes to suppose them. She is corrupted in that country town with vile conversation' (Swift, Journal to Stella, 1.118–19).

== Death in exile ==
In late 1711, by careful management of her £100 annuity and £60 rental from 'Newburg-house' in London, (Swift, Journal to Stella, 2.446) having almost paid her debts, Anne hoped to be able to leave King's Lynn. However, she had for some time suffered from asthma and dropsy, and she died in King's Lynn on 22 December. When Swift arrived in London at the Vanhomrighs' house on 25 December, for Christmas dinner, he was told the news: 'I never was more afflicted at any death – She had all sorts of amiable qualities, and no ill ones but the indiscretion of neglecting her own affairs' (ibid., 2.445–6). Swift suspected that to avoid the expense of a London funeral or public mourning, Anne's brother intended to keep her death a secret. Swift placed a notice of her death in The Post-Boy of 27 December. He also wrote to Thomas Pyle, the minister of St Nicholas's Chapel, at King's Lynn, revealing Anne's true identity and asking that she be buried in the church and that a memorial stone be placed there at Swift's own expense. Swift wrote in his account book a private commemoration of Anne Long, which was perhaps his most eloquent appreciation of her: 'She was the most beautiful Person of the Age she lived in, of great Honr and Virtue, infinite Sweetness and Generosity of Temper and true good Sense'. She figures in "The British Court", a poem published in 1707.

== Sources ==
- I.Ehrenpreis, Swift: the man, his works and the age, 3 vols. (1962–83) ·
- D.Nokes, Jonathan Swift: a hypocrite reversed (1985) ·
- E.Hardy, The conjured spirit (1949) ·
- J.Swift, Journal to Stella, ed. H. Williams, 2 vols. (1948) ·
- The correspondence of Jonathan Swift, ed. H. Williams, 5 vols. (1963–65)
- Dictionary of National Biography
