= Gifford Long =

English MP, landowner and magistrate

Gifford Long (c. 1576 – 15 December 1635) was an English MP, landowner, and magistrate.

== Biography ==
Born at Broughton Gifford, Wiltshire, the eldest surviving son and heir of Edward Long, clothier of Monkton, and his wife Ann Brouncker (sister of Sir Willam Brouncker, and aunt of William, 1st Viscount Brouncker), he was educated at Magdalen College, Oxford, matriculating in 1593. After succeeding to his father's estates in 1622, including the manor of Rood Ashton, Long was appointed High Sheriff of Wiltshire in 1624, and elected Member for Westbury in May 1625.

He was caught up in a great purge, when on 22 December 1625, Chancery issued new commissions of the peace to remove justices, in which between thirty and forty percent of J.P.s throughout twenty counties were abruptly dismissed. However, he was among the first to regain office, returning to the Wiltshire commission on 23 February 1626.

He married firstly in 1597, Ann Yewe of Bradford, who died shortly after the birth of their second daughter in 1601. His second wife was Amy Wingate, née Warre, (widow of Robert Wingate of Harlington House, Bedfordshire), the daughter of Roger Warre of Hestercombe, and granddaughter of Lord Chief Justice Sir John Popham. Long had a further five children with his second wife.

After his death on 15 December 1635, the manor of Rood Ashton descended to his eldest son and heir, Edward, who had married in 1632, Dorothy, sister of Sir Samuel Jones of Courteenhall, Northamptonshire. The descent of the manor continued in the Long family for a further 295 years, until 1930, when it was sold by the executors of his descendant, the 1st Viscount Long.

== See also ==
- Rood Ashton House
