= South Wraxall Manor =

Grade I listed building

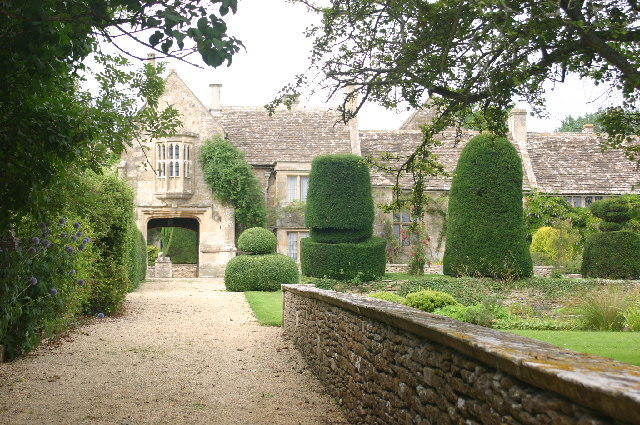

- Location within Wiltshire
- 51°23′16″N 2°14′28″W
- Location: South Wraxall, Wiltshire, England

Site notes
- Owner: John Taylor and Gela Nash-Taylor

Listed Building – Grade I
- Official name: South Wraxall Manor, with garden wall to South
- Designated: 13 November 1962
- Reference no.: 1021853

South Wraxall Manor is a Grade I listed country house which dates from the early 15th century, at South Wraxall in the English county of Wiltshire, about 3 miles (5 km) north of Bradford on Avon. According to popular legend, the house was the first place tobacco was smoked in England, by Sir Walter Long and his friend Sir Walter Raleigh (although this has also been said of other houses related to Raleigh).

== History of the house and its land ==
It is possible that there was a manor house in the 14th century, which later became Manor Farmhouse. The present house stands a short distance to the southwest of that site.

The first known member of the Long family to own land in South Wraxall was Robert Long, a lawyer who sat in Parliament for several sessions between 1414 and 1442, mostly for the Wiltshire constituency. He built South Wraxall Manor soon after buying the estate; he was living there in 1429 and a few years later exchanged lands in Wraxall with the Abbess of Shaftesbury. He died in 1447. His great-great grandson Sir Robert Long altered the doorway to the Long chapel in 1566, having his initials and badges carved into the stone above it.

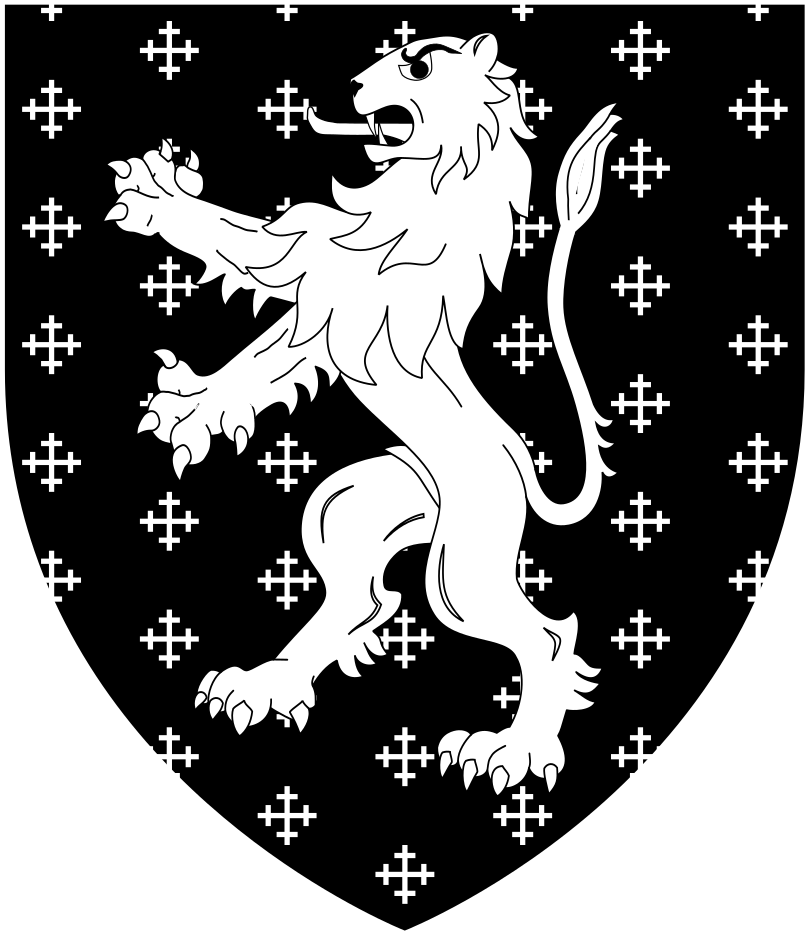
Arms of Long of South Wraxall: Sable semée of cross-crosslets, a lion rampant argent

Over the generations, the Long family acquired more and more land, until eventually they owned all the property within South Wraxall that had once belonged to Monkton Farleigh Priory. The manor was passed down through the Longs of Wraxall until it reached Walter Long who died unmarried in 1807, and his unmarried sister Katherine continued to live in it till her death aged 97, in 1814. By his will it then passed to his cousins, Richard Godolphin Long of Rood Ashton, and his brother John. It was over 150 years before another member of the Long family lived at the manor for any length of time.

The house was first let from 1820 to 1826 to a Dr Knight who kept a school there for about forty boys. He disfigured the house by plastering over the carved ceilings and painting the oak panelled wainscots, but this was later reinstated in its original style by the 1st Viscount Long. Lord Long's initials, WHL, can be seen on many properties in the village but he never lived there. Throughout the rest of the 19th century the house was lived in by caretakers.

The manor was retained by the family and tenanted after the rest of the South Wraxall estate (including the majority of property in the village) was sold on 20 May 1919. In 1935, after the death of the tenant, the house was taken over by the 2nd Viscount Long who undertook further restoration; by then the former principal residence of the family at Rood Ashton had been sold. During the Second World War the manor housed evacuees from Kent, and was used as a convalescent home for children. In the 1950s it was occupied by the 2nd Viscount's sister-in-law Anne, who was married to Lord Rothermere. (Anne later divorced Rothermere, to marry Ian Fleming).

The last member of the Long family to live at the manor was Sara Morrison, the only daughter of the 2nd Viscount Long, and wife of Conservative MP, Charles Morrison. The house was sold in 1966, together with 830 acres (340 ha), after five hundred years of family ownership.

== Recent history ==
The house was recorded as Grade I listed in 1962, as was Manor Farmhouse. The 18th-century gatepiers at the south entrance were Grade II listed in 1988.

John Taylor (bass player with the band Duran Duran) and his wife Gela Nash-Taylor (co-founder of Juicy Couture) purchased the house in 2005 and live there when Taylor's band is working in England.

== Publication ==
The Country House Revealed, a 2011 BBC TV series, featured the house in episode 1. The series was accompanied by an illustrated book with a chapter on the Manor.

== See also ==
- Category:Long family of Wiltshire
