= Draycot Cerne =

Village in Wiltshire, England

Coordinates: 51°30′23″N 2°05′44″W

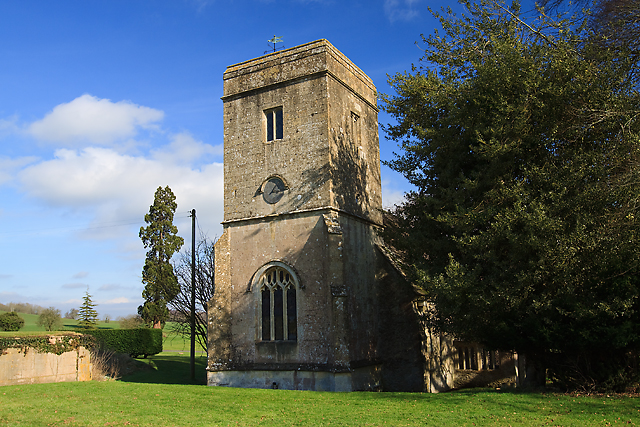
- Church of St James

- Location within Wiltshire
- OS grid reference: ST934787
- Civil parish: Sutton Benger
- Unitary authority: Wiltshire
- Ceremonial county: Wiltshire
- Region: South West
- Country: England
- Sovereign state: United Kingdom
- Post town: CHIPPENHAM
- Postcode district: SN15
- Dialling code: 01249
- Police: Wiltshire
- Fire: Dorset and Wiltshire
- Ambulance: South Western
- UK Parliament: South Cotswolds

Draycot Cerne (Draycott) is a small village and former civil parish, now in the parish of Sutton Benger, in Wiltshire, England, about 3 miles (5 km) north of Chippenham.

== History ==
The parish was referred to as Draicote (Medieval Latin) in the ancient Domesday hundred of Startley when Geoffrey de Venoix ("the Marshal") was lord and tenant-in-chief in 1086. The morpheme dray is common in England's place names, yet unused elsewhere in the English language, so is considered an ancient Celtic word. By the 14th century, the old village was known as Draycot Cerne, in part to differentiate it from similarly named villages in other areas of England. The suffix Cerne is the French surname of the lords of the manor.

The ancient parish of Draycot Cerne comprised three manors: Draycot Cerne, Knabwell (or Nables) and a detached part to the southeast at Avon, near Kellaways. The old village of Draycot Cerne (also known in the 19th century as Lower Draycot), close to the church and Draycot House, was removed by Henry Wellesley, 1st Earl Cowley after 1865 and Upper Draycot was renamed Draycot Cerne. All of the cottages and farms of Draycot Cerne were within the Draycot Estate, belonging to Draycot House.

In 1931 the civil parish had a population of 113. The parish of Draycot Cerne, together with Seagry parish to its north, was added to Sutton Benger civil parish on 1 April 1934. In 1971 all land north of the newly built M4 motorway, including part of the former Draycot parish, was transferred to a recreated Seagry parish.

== Former parish church ==
St James's Church, a Grade II* listed building, was built around 1260 and has a 16th-century tower. It was declared redundant in 1994 and is now in the care of the Churches Conservation Trust.

The benefice was united with Seagry in 1939 but in 1954 the union was dissolved, and for church purposes the village is now within the parish of Kington Langley.

== Draycot House ==
A medieval manor has occupied the site since the 14th century. Old Draycot House was probably built for John Long in the mid 15th century. The house was extensively re-modelled, over the years, by the Long family. In 1773–75 Sir James Tylney-Long (1736-1794) added a new south front, and east and west wings around the core of the medieval manor. Further work was undertaken in 1784, including the design of a ceiling by James Wyatt, with one of his pupils, and again, in 1864, after Lord Cowley's inheritance. The house was demolished in 1952–4.

== The Long family of Draycot Cerne ==
The following family members were active in English politics:

- Robert Long (died 1447)
- John Long (c.1419–1478)
- Sir Thomas Long (c.1451–1508)
- Henry Long (c.1489–1556), High Sheriff of Wiltshire, Somerset and Dorset
- Richard Long (courtier) (c. 1494–1546), younger brother of Henry
- Sir Robert Long (c. 1517–1581)
- Sir Walter Long (c.1594–1637)
- Sir Robert Long, 1st Baronet (c.1600–1673) of Westminster, younger brother of Sir Walter
- Sir James Long, 2nd Baronet (c.1617–1692)
- Sir Robert Long, 3rd Baronet (1673–1692)
- Sir Giles Long, 4th Baronet (1675–1698)
- Sir James Long, 5th Baronet (1681–1728/29)
- Sir Robert Long, 6th Baronet (1704-1767)
- Sir James Tylney-Long, 7th Baronet (1737–1794)
- Sir James Tylney-Long, 8th Baronet (1794–1805)

Between 1412 and 1610, the Long family held Draycot House jointly with South Wraxall Manor, near Bradford-on-Avon, Wiltshire.

Other members:

- Anne Long (c.1681–1711), a well-known figure in London society
- Catherine Tylney-Long (1789–1825), inherited the estate in 1805
- William Pole-Tylney-Long-Wellesley, 5th Earl of Mornington (1813–1863), son of Catherine

== The Draycot Estate ==
The Draycot Estate covered 4,300 acres (17 km^{2}) at its most, covering as landlord (with some principal demesne, i.e. private parkland) all but a small minority of land (remaining commons, rectories, vicarages and glebelands) of Draycot Cerne, Kellaways, Sutton Benger and Seagry, parts of Startley, Little Somerford, Christian Malford and Kington Langley. It was the third-largest holding of the Tylney-Long baronets.

== Notable people ==
- John Buckeridge (c. 1562–1631), theologian, was born in Draycot Cerne.
- John Aubrey (1626–1697), antiquary, natural philosopher and writer, was a frequent visitor to old Draycot House. His biography, by Ruth Scurr, was illustrated on the front cover with a watercolour of Aubrey and Sir James Long, 2nd Baronet of Draycot hunting together. Some of the correspondence between Aubrey and Sir James Long, at the Bodleian Library, is published in Early Modern Letters Online. Other letters were directed to Aubrey via Robert Hooke at Gresham College.
- John Britton (1771–1857), antiquary, was educated at Draycot House school, although he later complained about the quality of the teaching.
- Francis Kilvert (1840–1879), the diarist, was a frequent visitor to Draycot Cerne.
- Henry Wellesley, 1st Earl Cowley inherited the former Long family estate of Draycot Cerne in 1863 from his cousin the 5th Earl of Mornington, and lived there in retirement until his death in 1884.
- Prince Franz von Hatzfeldt-Wildenburg of the House of Hatzfeld and his wife, Clara, leased Draycot House between 1896 and 1915. He was the owner of Ascetic's Silver, the winner of the 1906 Grand National. She was the adopted daughter of the American billionaire Collis Potter Huntington.
