= Walter Long (of South Wraxall) =

Of South Wraxall, British landowner (c. 1712–1807)

Walter Long of South Wraxall, near Bradford-on-Avon (c. 1712–1807), the great-great-great grandson of Sir Walter Long of South Wraxall and Draycot, was born in Wiltshire, and inherited along with other family estates, the 15th-century house known as South Wraxall Manor. His ancestors made their wealth initially as clothiers. He served as High Sheriff of Wiltshire for 1764.

Long died in Bath in 1807, aged at least 93 years. He bequeathed the bulk of his fortune to the sons of his cousin Richard Long of Rood Ashton, Wiltshire.

== Marriage controversy ==
At the age of about sixty, and never previously married, Long became engaged to Elizabeth Ann Linley, a celebrated singer of the town of Bath, and a great beauty. She was about sixteen years old. The engagement was arranged by her father Thomas Linley, an impoverished composer, who had his eyes on Long's great wealth. The marriage did not take place, however: Long is said to have dissolved the contract after Elizabeth secretly told him she would never be happy as his wife, taking on himself the entire blame for breaking off the alliance. He reputedly paid her father, who was proceeding to bring the transaction into court, a settlement of £3,000. Elizabeth was allowed to keep the jewels and other gifts Long had showered upon her during their engagement.

Long knew that Elizabeth Ann was in love with a young playwright, Richard Brinsley Sheridan, with whom she later eloped in 1772. The whole business was well publicised at the time, and soon became the subject of a satirical play The Maid of Bath written by Samuel Foote, which opened in 1771 at the Haymarket Theatre in London. Sheridan was one of Foote's favourite targets. Long's character, played by Foote himself, was named Solomon Flint, described as a "fat, fusty, shabby, shuffling, money loving, water drinking, mirth-marring, amorous old huncks", who "owns half the farms in the country", being 60 at least and "a filthy old goat! He supposedly has a rumbling old family coach and a moated haunted old house in the country."

Foote was frequently threatened with libel suits. Long heard about the play before it was produced and tried unsuccessfully to persuade Foote to abandon the whole thing, even threatening violence against him. He commenced an action for damages against Foote, but the affair seems to have ended there.

== Sources ==
- Samuel Foote, The Maid of Bath (John Wheble, 1778; first performed, 1771)
- Thomas Moore, Memoirs of the Life of the Right Honorable Richard Brinsley Sheridan, Vol. 1
- Frank Frankfort Moore, A Nest of Linnets (1901)
- Isabelle Baudino, Jacques Carré, Cécile Révauger, The Invisible Woman: aspects of women's work in eighteenth-century Britain (2007), ISBN 0-7546-3572-4
