= Walter Long (died 1610) =

English knight and landowner

Sir Walter Long (1560 or 1565? – October 1610) was an English knight and landowner, born in Wiltshire, the son of Sir Robert Long and his wife Barbara Carne.

== Public service ==
He was elected knight of the shire (MP) for Wiltshire in 1593.

In 1601 Long was appointed High Sheriff of Wiltshire and in 1602 Deputy Lieutenant of Wiltshire under Edward Seymour, 1st Earl of Hertford.

== The two Sir Walters ==
Long was a friend of Sir Walter Raleigh, (Raleigh's brother Carew had married Long's mother-in-law, widow of the first Sir John Thynne of Longleat), and according to historian John Aubrey, Long was the first in the country to introduce the fashion of smoking tobacco, his friend Raleigh being the first to bring it to England. Long's home of South Wraxall Manor is one of the houses in England where legend says tobacco was first smoked by the two Sir Walters, although the same legend has been told of other locations. Aubrey also alludes to Sir Walter Long's ostentatious lifestyle, saying he kept a trumpeter, and on at least one occasion, he rode to Marlborough with thirty servants and retainers.

== Feuding neighbours ==
Long and his brother Henry were involved in a dispute with their neighbours, the Danvers, and Long supported the claims of Danvers' tenants to rights of common, which in 1596 resulted in the Star Chamber deciding that Long was to blame for hedge-breaking on the Danvers' enclosures, and he was fined £200 for 'a great riot' over the hedge-destroying incident. Twenty eight people had been involved, according to the judge, and many Wiltshire Yeomen were fined. The dispute between the Longs and the Danvers' became a violent and deadly feud, eventually resulting in the murder of Henry Long.

== Family ==
Sir Walter Long married firstly, Mary, daughter of Sir Thomas Packington (died 2 June 1571) of Westwood, Worcestershire and Dorothy Kitson. She was on friendly terms with Elizabeth I, and gifts to the Queen from Lady Long, which included an item of 18 ounces of gilt plate, were recorded in the Jewel House records in 1588. There were two children of this marriage.

Long married secondly, Catherine, daughter of Sir John Thynne of Longleat. Long was the last of the family to own both manors of South Wraxall and Draycot together, and through the contrivances of his second wife Catherine, Sir Walter disinherited his son John from his first marriage, in favour of Walter, the eldest son from the second, but a compromise later led John to receive the estate at South Wraxall, and his half-brother received Draycot.

There were at least thirteen children from his second marriage, including:

- Sir Robert Long, 1st Baronet
- Sir Walter Long (c. 1594 – 1637) (father of Sir James Long, 2nd Baronet)

Another legend related by Aubrey, concerns a promise made by Catherine to her husband on his death-bed, that she would not remarry, but she soon afterwards married Sir Edward Fox, which as the story goes, caused the portrait of Sir Walter to fall from the wall the moment the bride and her new husband entered the room.

Sir Walter died in October 1610 and was buried at Draycot on 30 October 1610.

== See also ==
- Sir Robert Long (c. 1517 – c. 1581) for more on the murder of Henry Long
- Walter Long (of South Wraxall) for more on the descent of the manor of South Wraxall
- Long family (Wiltshire) for a list of members of the Long family of Wiltshire
