= Thomas Long of Draycot =

English landowner and knight (c. 1451–1508)

Sir Thomas Long of Draycot (c. 1451–1508) was an English landowner and knight. He is known to have served as one of the Members of Parliament for the borough of Westbury in 1491 and was twice High Sheriff of Wiltshire.

== Life ==
Born in Wiltshire, the son of John Long and his wife Margaret Wayte, he succeeded to the Draycot estates on the death of his father on 20 September 1478, and inherited South Wraxall from his uncle Henry Long in 1490. Long was among the 'great compaignye of noble men' who went with Edward, Duke of Buckingham, in 1496 to meet the King at Taunton, then in pursuit of Perkin Warbeck. In 1501 he received a knighthood at the marriage of Henry VII's eldest son, Arthur, Prince of Wales, and he was also at the reception of Catherine of Aragon at Shaftesbury in October of that year.

Long was elected a member of parliament for Westbury in 1491. He was appointed High Sheriff of Wiltshire in 1500 and again in 1506.

He married Margery, daughter of Sir George Darell, of Littlecote House, and had one daughter and seven sons, including Sir Richard Long (c.1494 – 1546) and Sir Henry Long.

Long died in 1508 and his remains are entombed in a 'rich gothique altar monument' (as described by John Aubrey) in St James's Church, Draycot Cerne, Wiltshire. Hanging above his tomb until recently, and authenticated by the British Museum, were his armour Haume (helmet) and gauntlets, dating from c.1490. These are now safely kept in the Wiltshire Museum in Devizes.

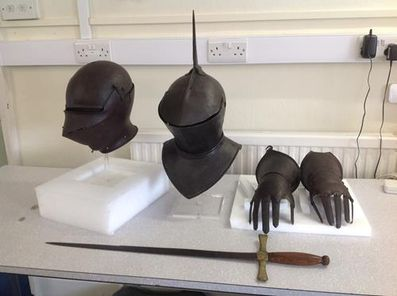

== Royal descendant ==
King Charles III is a descendant of Sir Thomas Long, as is Mark Phillips, the first husband of Anne, Princess Royal.

== Sources ==
- A Political Index to the Histories of Great Britain & Ireland – Robert Beatson, 1806
- The Gentleman's Magazine
- Burke's History of the Commoners of Great Britain and Ireland – John Burke, 1838
