= Walter Long (of Preshaw) =

English landowner (1788–1871)

Walter Long of Preshaw House, Hampshire, JP, DL (24 November 1788 – 5 January 1871) was an English landowner.

Descended from the Long family of Wiltshire, he was born at Corhampton, Hampshire, the only son of John Long and Ellen Hippesley Trenchard. He was educated at Oriel College, Oxford where he gained a BA in 1809, and MA in 1812. He was a student of Lincoln's Inn in 1809. He became a justice of the peace in 1815 and was appointed High Sheriff of Hampshire in 1824.

On the death of his father in 1797 he inherited the estate of Preshaw at Upham with its Elizabethan mansion, surrounded by approximately 1,670 acres (6.8 km^{2}), and in 1810 commissioned John Nash to make alterations to the house. He also inherited a moiety of the estates of his maternal uncle J. W. H. Trenchard in 1801 including the manor of Overcourt, Gloucestershire. Prior to ownership by the Trenchards (from 1617), Overcourt had been owned by Henry Long, Lord of the manor of Southwick, and was at one time a royal hunting lodge. The present building dates from the late 14th century, and was restored by Edward IV for his mother Cecily, Duchess of York. Walter Long also inherited the estates in Somerset and Dorset on the death of his uncle, the eminent surgeon of St Bartholomew's Hospital, William Long of Marwell Hall, in 1818, and those in Oxfordshire on the death of his cousin John Blackall in 1829, which included Haseley Court.

== Marriage and family ==
On 12 February 1810, Walter Long married Lady Mary Carnegie, eldest daughter of Admiral William Carnegie, 7th Earl of Northesk G.C.B, and Mary Ricketts. They had twelve children.

He died 5 January 1871 and Lady Mary died 7 March 1875. They are both buried at Upham.
