= Walter Long (c. 1594 – 1637) =

English landowner and Member of Parliament

Sir Walter Long (c. 1594 – July 1637) was an English landowner and Member of Parliament.

== Biography ==
He was born in Wiltshire, the son of Sir Walter Long (1565–1610) and his wife Catherine Thynne of Longleat. He succeeded to his father's estates, including Draycot, in 1610 and was knighted in 1625.

He served as a Justice of the Peace for Wiltshire from 1623 until his death. He replaced Sir James Ley as MP for Westbury in 1621 when Ley was appointed to a post in the House of Lords. He was re-elected for the same seat in 1625 and 1626.

He married firstly in 1614, Anne Ley, daughter of James Ley, 1st Earl of Marlborough and his first wife Mary Pettie. There was one son from this marriage, his heir, Sir James Long, 2nd Baronet. According to historian John Aubrey, Long's father-in-law spent so much time at Draycot House with his daughter and her husband, that he had a gateway erected there with his own Coat of arms on it, but afterwards there was a quarrel, which probably arose from some family disapproval of the Earl's marriage with a third young wife, Jane Boteler. The rift seems to have continued till the end of the Earl's life - in his will he 'begged pardon of the Lady Anne'. Long married secondly, Elizabeth Master c. 1636, and they had one son, Walter (d. 1673).

Sir Walter Long died in July 1637, and his widow died in 1658. According to one of William Waller's men writing about the capture of Long's son Sir James at Devizes in 1645, Sir Walter Long had died after falling from his horse near Chichester and breaking his neck. He was supposedly 'in drink', and his son James 'almost spurred the horse to death that broke his father's neck'.
