= Sir James Long, 2nd Baronet =

English politician and Royalist soldier

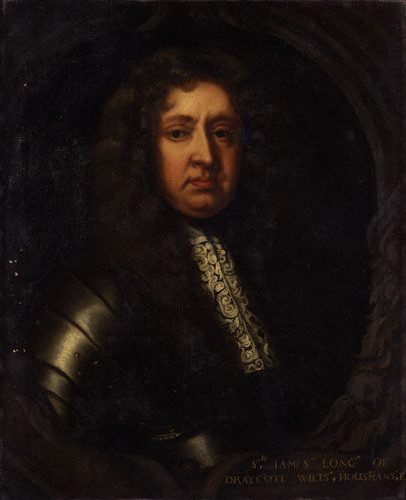
Sir James Long, 2nd Baronet

Sir James Long, 2nd Baronet (c. 1617 – 22 January 1692) was an English politician and Royalist soldier.

Born at South Wraxall, Bradford-on-Avon, Wiltshire, the son of Sir Walter Long and Anne Ley (daughter of James Ley, 1st Earl of Marlborough), he was educated at Magdalen College, Oxford, and admitted to Lincoln's Inn in 1634. At his father's death in 1637, Long inherited the bulk of his Wiltshire estates, including the manor of Draycot Cerne.

== Career ==
Long held the following offices:

- Officer in Royalist Army, 1642–1646
- (Royalist) High Sheriff of Wiltshire, 1644
- Fellow of the Royal Society, 1663 onward
- MP for Malmesbury, 1679, 1681, 1690–1692
- Gentleman of the Privy Chamber, 1673–1685
- Deputy-Lieutenant for Wiltshire, 1675

He succeeded his uncle Sir Robert Long as 2nd Baronet by special remainder in 1673.

Sir James was a magistrate. His friend, historian John Aubrey, wrote: "When there was a Cabal of Witches detected at Malmesbury they were examined by Sir James Long and committed by him to Salisbury Gaole. I think there were seven or eight old women hanged".

=== Capture by Waller ===
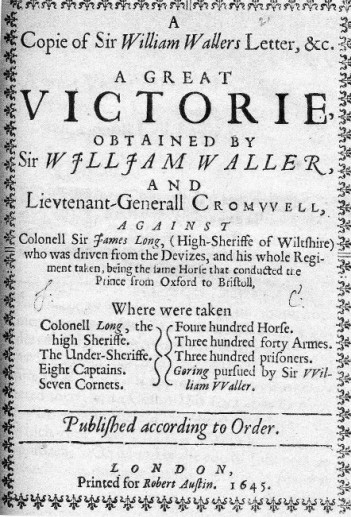
Waller's Declaration of Victory

He had entered the royal army and served in Sir Thomas Glemham's regiment at the beginning of the Civil War; later rising to the rank of Colonel of horse in Sir Francis Dodington's brigade.

In 1645, he escorted the Prince of Wales to Bristol, and while returning to Devizes he was overtaken by a superior force of Parliamentarians under Waller and Cromwell; he fell rapidly back towards Bath, hotly pursued by Waller; but was intercepted by Cromwell, and the high thick-set hedges prevented his escape. He was captured, but soon exchanged.

At the same time, his manor at Draycot was sequestrated by an Act of Parliament, but restored to him in 1649 on payment of a £700 fine. Not long after this, according to Aubrey, "Oliver Cromwell, Protector, hawking at Howneslowe Heath, discoursing with him (Sir James Long), fell in love with his company, and commanded him to weare his sword, and to meet him a hawkeing, which made the strict cavaliers look on him with an evill eye."

== Family ==
He married firstly, Anne, daughter of Sir William Dodington. There were no children from this marriage. He married secondly, c.1640, Dorothy, daughter of Sir Edward Leech (MP) (or Leche) of Shipley Hall, Derbyshire and Drury Lane, London. They had five daughters and one son, including:

- Anna Margaretta (c. 1641–1717) married Sir Richard Mason
- Dorothy (c. 1650 –) married Sir Henry Heron of Surfleet, Lincolnshire
- James Long (1652 – c. 1690)

== Death ==
Sir James Long died on 22 January 1692 from apoplexy and was succeeded as 3rd Baronet by his 19-year-old grandson Robert Long. Robert died of smallpox four days after his grandfather. Robert's brothers Giles and James became successively 4th Baronet and 5th Baronet.

The baronetcy became extinct in 1805 on the death of the 10-year-old 8th Baronet, son of Sir James Tylney-Long, 7th Baronet.

== James Long Esquire, his only son ==
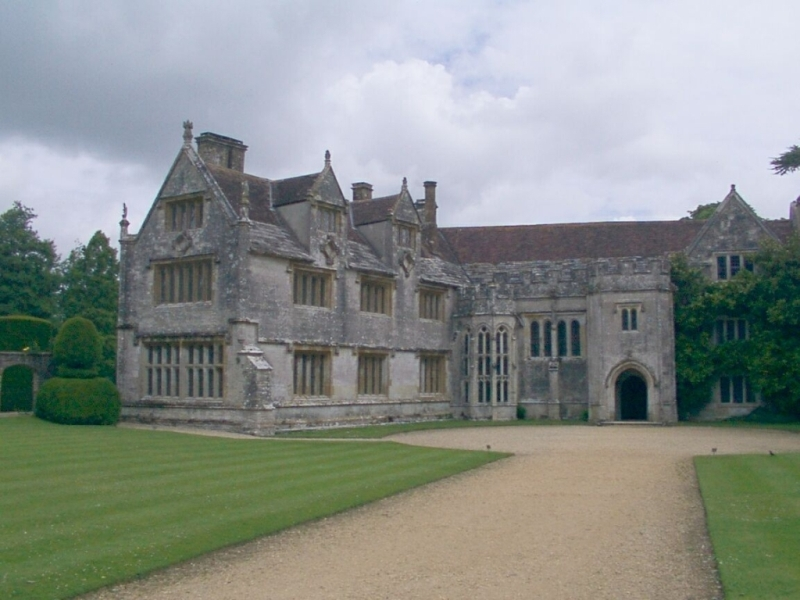
Athelhampton

Sir James's son lived at Athelhampton House in Dorset (also known as Admiston or Adminston), which had been inherited from Sir Robert Long in 1673. James married firstly, Susanna Strangways, daughter of leading civil war politician Colonel Sir Giles Strangways of Melbury, Dorset, a wealthy neighbour at Athelhampton. They had three daughters (Susan, Dorothy and Anne), and three sons (Robert, Giles and James) but the marriage was not a happy one. James was a gambler and a drinker, and Susanna and the children often retreated to her parents' home at Melbury.

After a by-election for the seat of Aldborough (the Longs had estates and interests in Yorkshire), Sir Henry Goodricke notified the newly elected member Sir John Reresby in December 1674 that: "Wee both have the satisfaction to be asured that Sir James Long and his son have both forfeited their interest with Coll. Strangeways; the father by high unkindnesse and folly, the son by hard usage of his wife, who has betaken herselfe wholy to her father's (Strangeways) house, and by the foolish losse of £15,000 in one year at play, in so much that hee dare not stirr out of his house in the country"

James appears to have continued his errant ways, when a further incident occurred in 1683. Certain affidavits were taken in connection with a Chancery suit, Keightley v. Long. The plaintiff, Mary Keightley, was trying to recover a debt from Mr. James Long, and in consequence of the suit the Court sanctioned the sequestration of his estates. Three men, armed with a commission from the Court, were sent to Athelhampton, and their request for information about Long from the villagers met with an eager response. They were told that Long was certainly at Athelhampton House and they must be wary, for he kept a sharp look-out for his creditors. Two cases of pistols and several swords were laid out ready for use near the door of the house, and only the previous evening he had been heard firing his pistols towards the entrance gate. It was well known, too, they alleged, that bullets were being made in the house. Whether this was true, or the villagers merely amusing themselves, can only be surmised.

However, despite initially being threatened with retaliation by four of Long's servants if they proceeded, the commissioners went to the house and demanded admittance. Long's wife Susanna called down to them from a window that her husband was abroad and that they would enter "at their peril". Susanna's brother later asserted that his sister was "soe affrighted" by the deportment of the men that she languished, and in a short time died.

James Long married again and the name of his second wife was Mary Keightley. They had one daughter. James's sister Anna wrote approvingly to their mother that Mary had "brought my brother of his drinking in a great measure and to love home". He died intestate in 1689/90, probably in debtor's prison, London, and is interred at Piddletown, Dorset.

Baronetage of England
Preceded by Robert Long	Baronet (of Westminster); 1673–1692	Succeeded by Robert Long
