= Robert Long (soldier) =

English knight and landowner

Sir Robert Long (c. 1517 – c. 1581) was an English knight and landowner.

== Life ==
He was born in Wiltshire, eldest surviving son and heir of Sir Henry Long of Draycot, and his wife Eleanor Wrottesley.

Long was Esquire of the Body to Henry VIII. He is recorded as being present at the reception of Anne of Cleves, and together with his father, he served at the Siege of Boulogne. He was given the manor of Calstone near Calne in 1538 in a grant by Henry VIII, and at least part of this land was still controlled by the Long family in 1704, when the rent from one farm called Tossells was used for a Draycot charity. In 1576 he acquired the manor of Sutton Benger, adjacent to Draycot.

He was appointed High Sheriff of Wiltshire in 1575, during the reign of Elizabeth I.

He married Barbara Carne c. 1546 and they had one daughter and four sons including:

- Sir Walter Long (d.1610)
- Jewel Long (d.1647), whose godfather was the Bishop of Salisbury, John Jewel
- Henry Long, murdered 1594

Sir Robert Long died at Draycot in 1581 and his wife died at Bulford in 1605.

== Murder of his son ==
Sir Robert's son Henry was murdered by Sir Charles Danvers and Sir Henry Danvers, after a long-running feud between the neighbouring Danvers' and the Longs, in particular, Henry and his brother Sir Walter Long. The mutual animosity came to a head in 1594, when their father Sir John Danvers, from the magistrate's bench, committed one of Sir Walter Long's servants for robbery. Sir Walter rescued the servant from the justice, and, after complaining to the judge at the next assizes, Sir John had Sir Walter locked up in the Fleet Prison. He then committed another of Sir Walter's servants on a charge of murder. On leaving prison, Sir Walter and his brother provoked various brawls between their own followers and Sir John's, resulting in one servant being killed and another grievously wounded.

=== History of the feud ===
Sir John Danvers was one of the executors of Sir Robert Long's will, indicating that perhaps the feud was started between the sons, and had not been carried over from a previous generation, although in his book William Shakespeare: The Man Behind the Genius, author Anthony Holden contends the feud dated as far back as the Wars of the Roses. Another author writes that it began as a result of the attempts of Sir Walter Long – recently returned from military service in Ireland, strengthened by his marriage to Catherine Thynne of Longleat, and with one of his houses, Draycot, only a few miles from the Danvers seat at Dauncey – to challenge the Danvers' predominance. Sir Charles Danvers developed a close friendship with Robert Devereux, 2nd Earl of Essex, and served under him in Ireland, later taking a prominent part in the revolt there. On the other hand, Sir Walter Long, through his Thynne connection, developed a friendship with Sir Walter Raleigh, who was deeply hostile to Essex. There was an established conservative group of gentry with whom the Danvers' associated, and who were opposed to the rival Knyvet-Long faction, which was backed by the Thynnes at Longleat.

=== Unendurable insults ===
It was the Danvers family itself, and not their followers, that were the target of the Longs, and Henry Long wrote insulting letters to Sir Charles Danvers calling him a liar, a fool, a puppy dog, a mere boy, and promised that he would whip his bare backside with a rod. Sir Charles was very angry. His mother later wrote to Lord Burghley describing the letters as 'of such a form as the heart of a man indeed had rather die than endure'. Accompanied by his brother and some of his men, he went to an inn at Corsham where Sir Walter and Henry Long were dining with a group of magistrates. Sir Henry Danvers drew his pistol, ('a certain engine called a dagge') and shortly after Henry Long was dead. The Danvers brothers got away and took refuge with their friend Henry Wriothesley, 3rd Earl of Southampton at his seat, Whitley Lodge near Titchfield, who happened to be in the midst of his twenty-first birthday celebrations.

== Romeo and Juliet? ==
Southampton was patron of William Shakespeare and some literary critics (e.g. A. L. Rowse, Anthony Burgess, M. C. Bradbrook) have conjectured that the feud may have inspired Shakespeare's Romeo and Juliet, and that Romeo's exile may allude to Southampton's protection of Sir Charles and Sir Henry Danvers, whom he aided in their escape to France.

According to historian John Aubrey, immediately after the murder of her son Henry, Lady Barbara Long, by then a widow and possibly a lady at court, informed the Queen of the 'verie strange owtrage committed by Sir Charles Danvers and Sir Henrie Danvers, Knights', although no indictment was ever preferred against them by either the Long family or the state. Aubrey also wrote that the events relating to the Danvers' escape and concealment hastened the death of the Danvers' father, and their mother soon remarried, to Sir Edmund Carey, a cousin of the Queen, to influence the granting of a pardon for her sons, which later eventuated, and the Danvers' returned to England in August 1598. Sir Henry Danvers later became Earl of Danby, and his brother Sir Charles was beheaded in 1600 for joining in a plot with the Earl of Essex against Queen Elizabeth.

== Sources ==
- Shakespeare – Anthony Burgess (1970)
- Romeo and Juliet, The Oxford Shakespeare. Introduction by Jill L. Levenson (2000)
- Dictionary of National Biography
- The Chronicle of Calais: In the Reigns of Henry VII and Henry VIII to the Year 1540 – Richard Turpyn (1846)
