= Richard Long (courtier) =

English politician and courtier

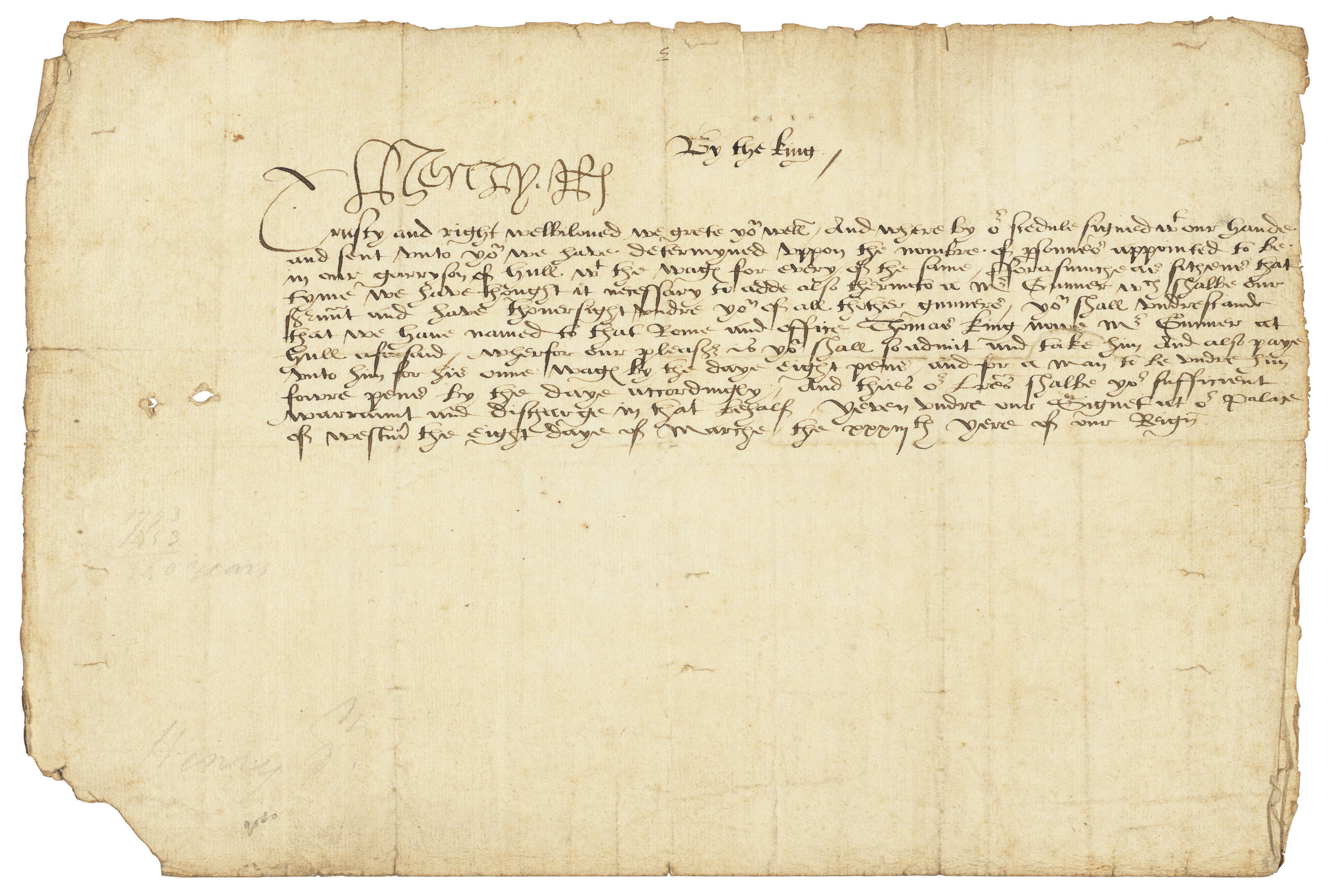
Letter sent to Sir Richard Long and Michael Stanhope by King Henry VIII. Written in Westminster, dated 8 March 1541-1542

Sir Richard Long (c. 1494 – 1546) was an English politician and courtier, for many years a member of the Privy Chamber of Henry VIII.

Long was the third son of Sir Thomas Long of Draycot (c. 1449–1508), Wiltshire landowner, and his wife, Margery (d. in or after 1508), daughter of Sir George Darrell of Littlecote House in Wiltshire.

== Career ==
Long was among the retinue of Sir Gilbert Talbot in 1512, who went as deputy to Calais, and by 1515 he was one of the spears of Calais, a post that he seems to have held for the rest of his life. How he came to be appointed to the court is not clear, but Long was listed by the Treasurer of the Chamber as working in the stables in December 1528, and certainly by 1533 he was an esquire of the stable. He had come to the attention of Cromwell by this time, who, with the exception in times of war, arranged for him to be non-resident in Calais. In 1532, Cromwell received a letter from Long's brother, Henry, to thank him for his favour to Richard. In 1535 Long was appointed to the privy chamber as Gentleman Usher, possibly through the influence of Cromwell. He quickly rose in prominence, gaining the favour of the King.

In 1537 he was knighted, on 15 October in the celebrations following the baptism of Prince Edward, in which he was one of the bearers of the canopy held over the infant in the baptismal procession, and the same day that his kinsman Edward Seymour, 1st Duke of Somerset was created earl of Hertford. In 1538 Long was appointed Master of the Buckhounds and Master of the Hawks. By 1539, he was a Gentleman of the Privy Chamber, and was present at the reception of Anne of Cleves, also in 1539. He was MP for Southwark the same year. Surviving the fall of his patron Cromwell, Long became a prominent servant of the government throughout the 1540s. He was one of the most senior members of the privy chamber during these years and his intimacy with the King made him a useful agent for secret and covert affairs.

Arriving in January 1541 at Calais to put its affairs in order, Long was described by the French ambassador, Charles de Marillac, bishop of Vienne, as 'a person of authority and conduct' (LP Henry VIII, 16.466). On his return he was instructed to arrest Sir John Wallop, a diplomat suspected of colluding with Cardinal Pole. This was a sensitive mission, and its failure was blamed not on Long, but on his kinsman Hertford. Later that year he worked on various commissions and juries dealing with the treason of Catherine Howard.

Making use of Long's military experience, the government appointed him governor of Guernsey, Alderney, and Sark in 1541, a post that he held until retirement due to illness in 1545, and in 1542 he was appointed captain of Kingston upon Hull with power to levy forces whenever occasion required, and with a place on the king's council of the north.

In a letter written by Henry VIII, he referred to Long as 'our trusty & right well-beloved Councillor, Sir Richard Long, Knt'. In 1542 Long gave the King a gift of a pair of purple satin stockings "embrauded all over with pirles of damask gold and damask silver", and the following year the King granted Long the manor of Shingay in Cambridgeshire.

He received large grants of Abbey lands from Henry VIII, in Essex, Cambridge, Suffolk and elsewhere, and together with his marriage, meant that like his fellow courtiers Welsbourne and Walsh, he was a rich man at his death on 30 September 1546.

== Marriage and family ==
Richard Long married Margaret Donnington in 1541. She was the only daughter of John Donnington of Stoke Newington in Middlesex, and widow of Thomas Kitson of Hengrave Hall, Suffolk. Their children included:

- Henry Long, to whom the King stood as godfather in 1544. His daughter Elizabeth married William Russell, 1st Baron Russell of Thornhaugh.
- Jane Long
- Katherine Long
- Mary Long.

His widow married John Bourchier, 2nd Earl of Bath, on 11 December 1548. She died on 20 December 1561 at Stoke Newington and was buried at Hengrave on 12 January 1562.
