= Preshaw =

Manor and estate in Hampshire, England

Coordinates: 51.006°N 1.18°W

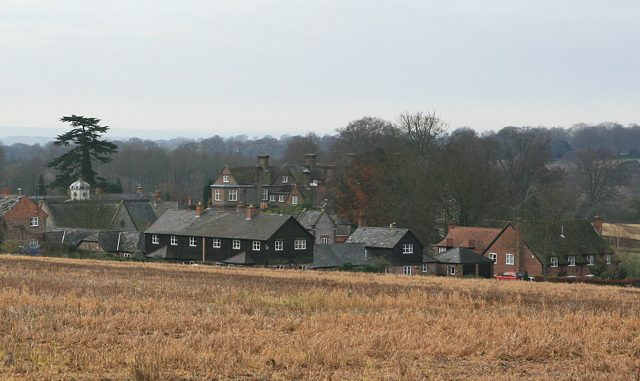
The main house and farm buildings

Preshaw (variously named Presshawe, Presthawe, and Preishawe in old documents) is a manor to the north of Corhampton in the United Kingdom. In the 19th century the mansion house Preshaw House was the seat of Walter Long, who inherited the estate on the death of his father, John Long in 1797. He also owned three farmlands on the estate, Little Preshaw, Middle Preshaw, and Lower Preshaw, to a total of 3,225 acres (1,305 ha) in Hampshire. The estate was at the time split across two parishes, Little and Middle Preshaw being in Exton parish and Lower Preshaw in Upham parish.

It was probably under the manor of Lomer in the Domesday Book, having been granted along with that manor in 1542 to William Paulet, whose descendants sold in 1707 to Robert Kirby, who in turn bequeathed it on his death in 1721 to his cousins in order to pay off debts to his relatives, who in their turn sold it in 1727 to John Long for £7,600. The manor eventually ended up in the possession John Long's grandson, Walter Jervis Long. His son Walter (1840-1919) was the last of the Longs to inhabit the manor, as he sold it in 1898 to William, Baron de Bush, who then sold it in 1901 to Reginald Harry Cholmondeley.

The manor house itself is a two-storey house built of flint with brick dressing that sits on the slope of Millbarrow Down. Its architecture dates it to the 1630s, although it has undergone two significant renovations and additions; including the addition of two gables (to the then existing three) on the front of the house as well as an additional block on the east end in the 18th century, and a further set of rooms on the south of the building in the 19th century. The 18th century additions are close enough to the original to be only noticeable upon close inspection, neither quite matching the older building, the former being entirely faced with brick and having no flint, and the latter using cement. The windows are not the original wooden frames, and the porch on the west side of the house with its modern door was probably not a porch originally.

== Gallery ==
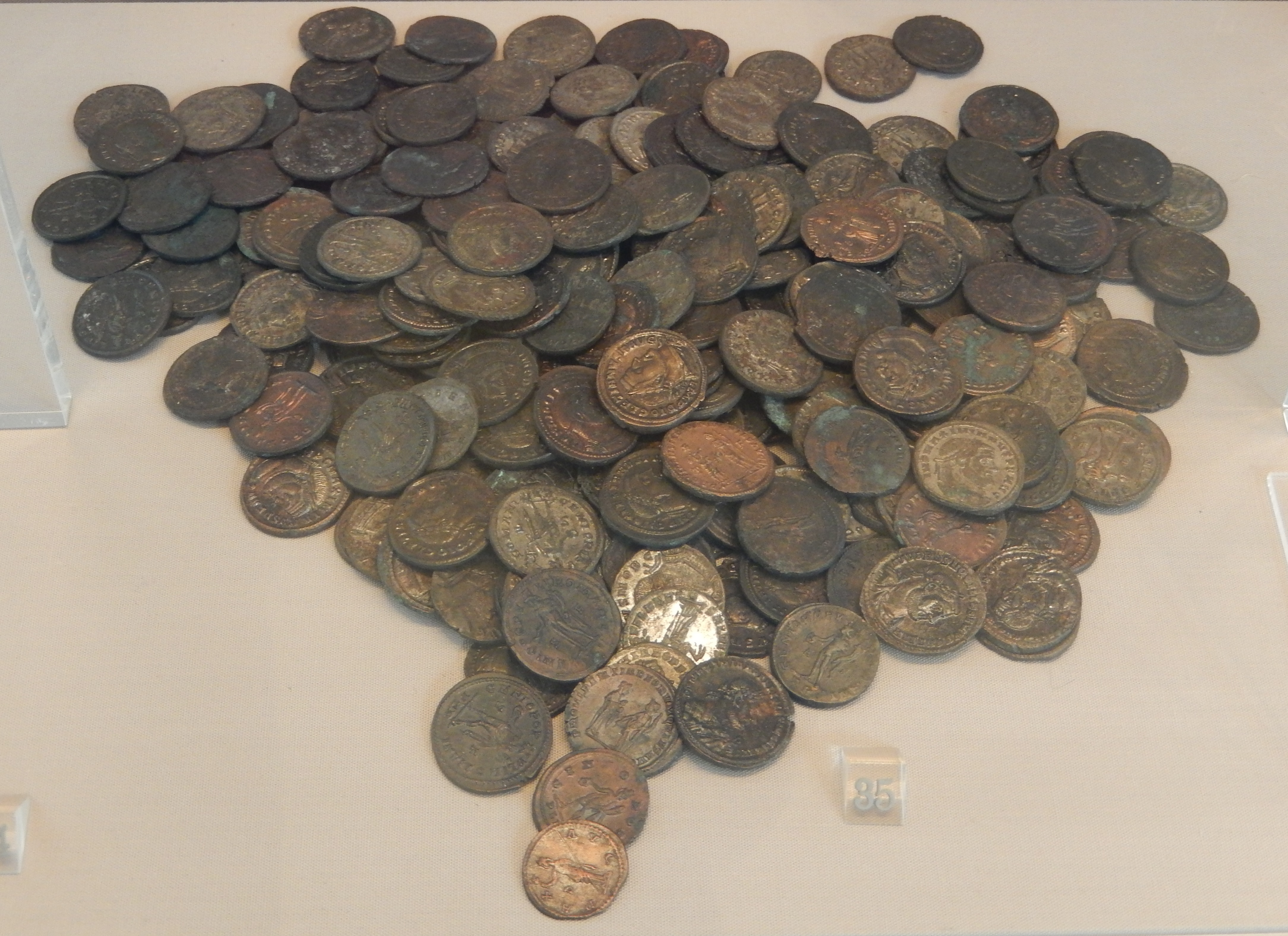
Hoard found in 1855

Chapel

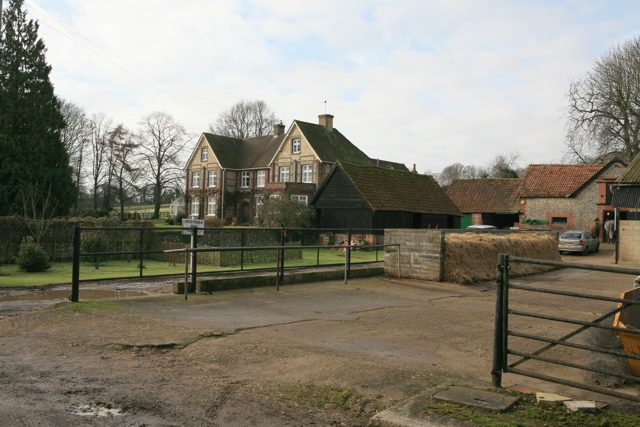
Lower Preshaw

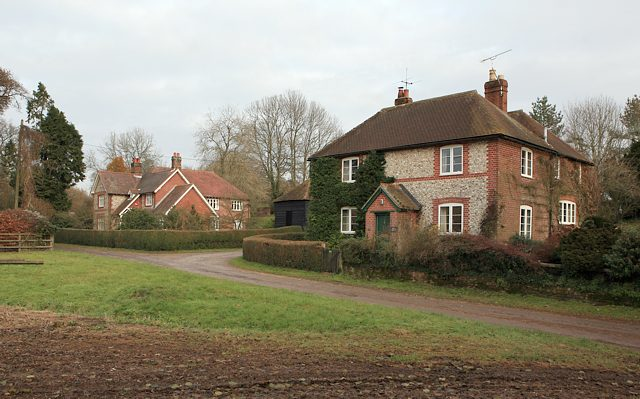
Middle Preshaw

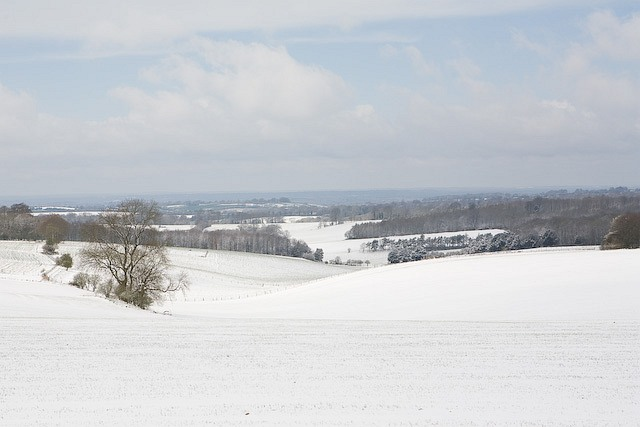
Preshaw Down

=== Further reading ===
- Nicol, Cheryl (2016). Inheriting the Earth: The Long Family's 500 Year Reign in Wiltshire. Hobnob Press. ISBN 1906978379.
