= Sir Robert Long, 1st Baronet =

English courtier and administrator

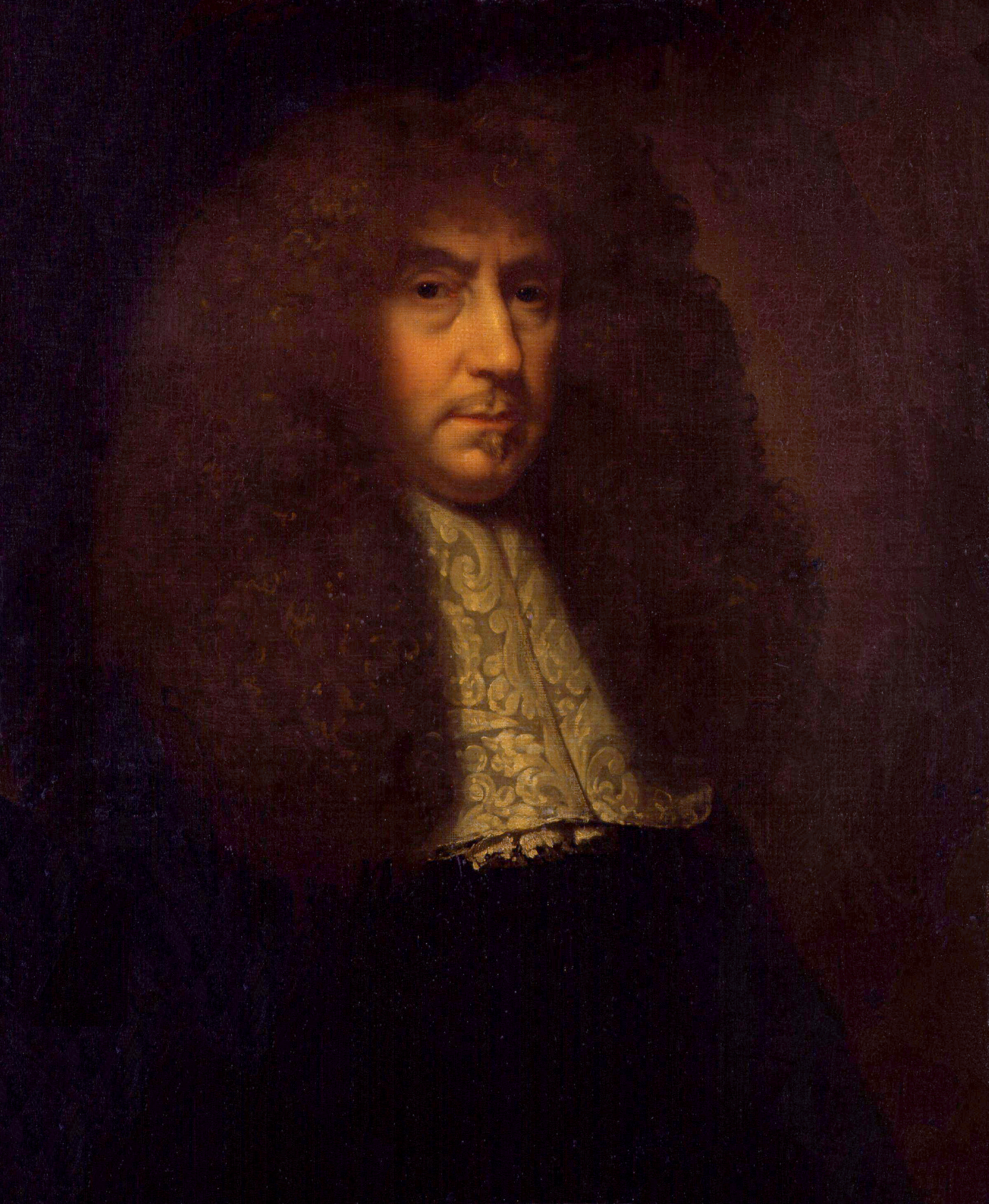
Sir Robert Long, 1st Baronet by Jacob Huysmans

Sir Robert Long, 1st Baronet (c. 1600 – 13 July 1673) of Westminster was an English courtier and administrator who sat in the House of Commons at various times between 1626 and 1673.

== Background ==
Long was the son of Sir Walter Long of South Wraxall and Draycot in Wiltshire, and his wife Catherine Thynne of Longleat. He matriculated at Magdalen Hall, Oxford on 1 February 1622, aged 16.

== Career ==
Long was elected Member of Parliament for Devizes in 1626 and in 1628. He sat until 1629 when King Charles decided to rule without parliament for eleven years. He held minor administrative offices in the service of King Charles I of England before the English Civil War. He attached himself to Queen Henrietta Maria and held the office of surveyor of the Queen's lands.

In April 1640, he was elected MP for Midhurst in the Short Parliament. In 1644 he became secretary of the council for the Prince of Wales and in effect became the Queen's representative in the Prince's entourage.

Long was not popular with Edward Hyde, 1st Earl of Clarendon, who in his History of the Rebellion was critical of the role Long played during the Civil War and later in exile. Clarendon suggested that Long loved money too much and was accused, together with John Colepeper, 1st Baron Colepeper, of improperly retaining prize money and disposing of cloth, sugar and other merchandise for their own benefit, resulting from a financially disappointing Royalist naval blockade of the Thames that they had been involved in. Clarendon also asserted that Long was not well thought of.

When King Charles II of England and Scotland went to Scotland after his father's execution, Long went with him again acting on behalf of Queen Henrietta Maria. The Scots however did not accept him, so he returned to the continent.

After the Commonwealth forces captured Jersey, where Long had been based for a time, they found a trunkful of compromising correspondence. It seems he was not trusted by either side, as he subsequently lost his place in the exiled court and had already had his land in England confiscated by Parliament.

At the restoration in 1660 Long pleaded poverty to the now extremely powerful Clarendon. He regained his place in the service of the Dowager Queen as well as receiving posts in the Exchequer. In 1661 he was elected MP for Boroughbridge, Yorkshire in the Cavalier Parliament and sat until his death. He was made a baronet on 1 September 1662 when he became auditor of the lower exchequer.

In April / May 1663, Charles II granted him a long lease of the Great Park, Great Park Meadow, and a house called Worcester Park House, all at Nonsuch, Surrey. An additional life, probably for his great nephew James Long Esq., was added in 1670. He became a privy councillor in 1672. He died in 1673 and was buried in Westminster Abbey. He died an extremely wealthy man.

== Family ==
Long never married and he arranged a special remainder to his baronetcy, so it was inherited by his nephew of Draycot, Sir James Long, 2nd Baronet, of Westminster in London.

Parliament of England
| Preceded by Edward Bayntun; Robert Drew | Member of Parliament for Devizes; 1626–1629; With: Sir Henry Ley 1626; Thomas Kent 1628–1629 | Parliament suspended until 1640 |
| Vacant Parliament suspended since 1629 | Member of Parliament for Midhurst; 1640 (April); With: Thomas May | Succeeded by Dr Chaworth; Thomas May |
| Preceded by Conyers Darcy; Sir Henry Stapylton | Member of Parliament for Boroughbridge; 1661–1673; With: Sir Richard Maulevrer, Bt | Succeeded by Sir Richard Maulevrer, Bt; Sir Henry Goodricke, Bt |
Political offices
| Preceded by Sir Robert Pye | Auditor of the Exchequer; 1662–1673 | Succeeded by Sir Robert Howard |
Baronetage of England
| New creation | Baronet (of Westminster); 1662–1673 | Succeeded by James Long |
