= South Wraxall =

Village in Wiltshire, England

Coordinates: 51.382°N 02.244°W

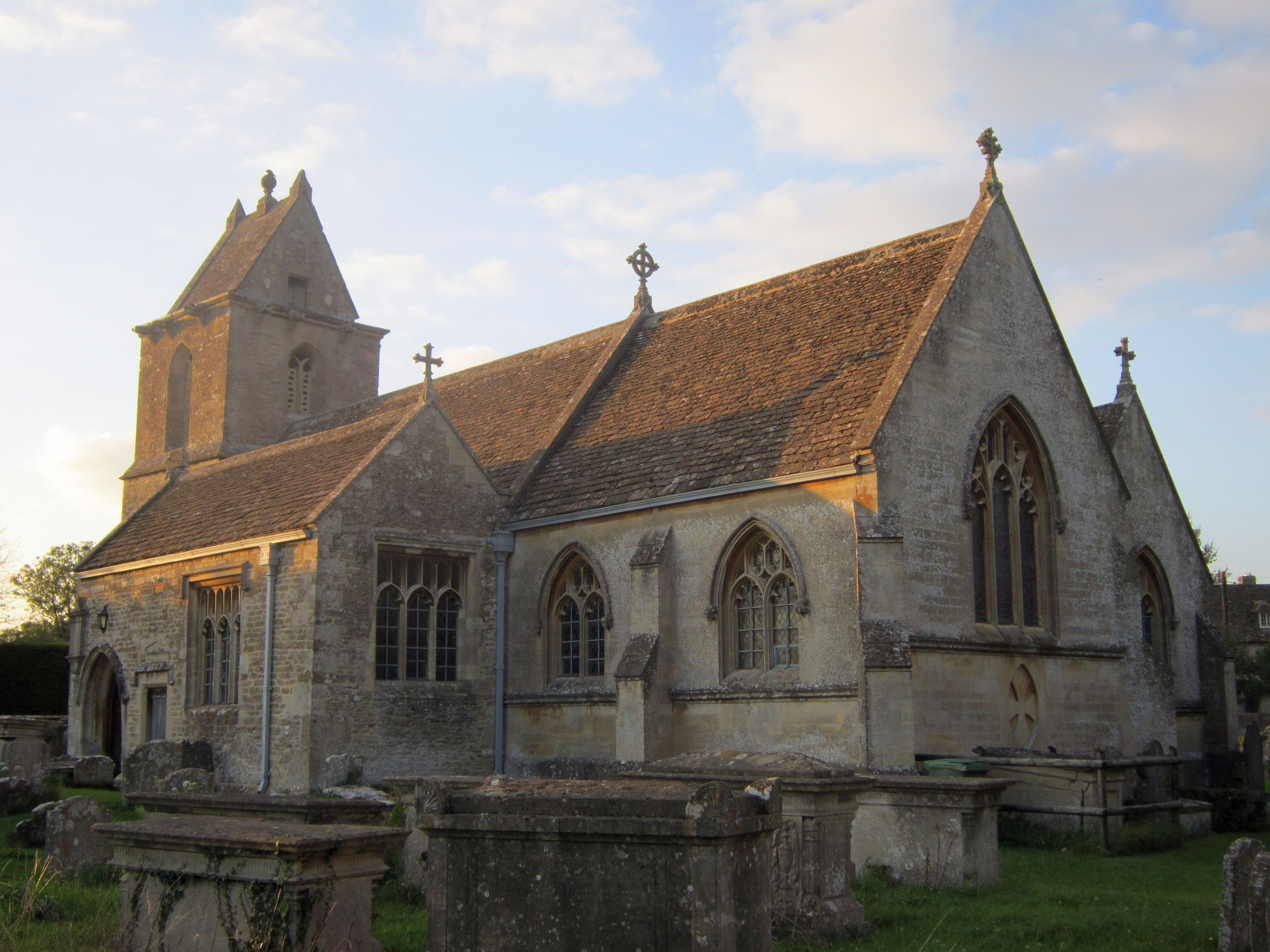
- St. James parish church

- Location within Wiltshire
- Population: 438 (in 2011)
- OS grid reference: ST833655
- Civil parish: South Wraxall
- Unitary authority: Wiltshire
- Ceremonial county: Wiltshire
- Region: South West
- Country: England
- Sovereign state: United Kingdom
- Post town: BRADFORD-ON-AVON
- Postcode district: BA15
- Dialling code: 01225
- Police: Wiltshire
- Fire: Dorset and Wiltshire
- Ambulance: South Western
- UK Parliament: Melksham and Devizes

South Wraxall is a village and a civil parish in Wiltshire, England, 2.5 miles (4.0 km) north of Bradford on Avon. The village is to the west of the B3109 road from Bradford on Avon to Corsham.

The parish includes the village of Lower Wraxall, to the south of South Wraxall; one field separates the two villages. The hamlet of Bradford Leigh is in the southeast of the parish.

Locally and by postal address the two villages are often referred to by alternate names. South Wraxall is known as Upper South Wraxall and Lower Wraxall is known as Lower South Wraxall

== History ==
The name comes from old English wrocc, meaning a buzzard, although it was also used as a personal name. Its name was first mentioned in 1468 as Suthwroxhall, distinguishing it from North Wraxall which is 6 miles (9.7 km) away. Other spellings of the name included wroxhal (1227) and wrokeshal (1242). Nevertheless, South Wraxall was not mentioned in Domesday Book, as it was grouped in with Bradford on Avon.

Domesday Book recorded a small settlement of seven households at Cubrewelle, in the southwest of the modern parish. The name survives on maps as Great Cumberwell, and in the names of Cumberwell Park golf course and Cumberwell Wood.

In the 13th century, estates at South Wraxall were held by Monkton Farleigh Priory and by Shaftesbury Abbey. Robert Long (c. 1391 – 1447) had a house at Wraxall in 1429 and obtained land from Shaftesbury; South Wraxall Manor became the principal residence of the Long family, who also owned Draycot manor through inheritance by Thomas Long (c. 1451–1508). A later generation acquired the land formerly held by Monkton Farleigh, and the combined estate remained in the Long family until being broken up by a sale in 1919.

The civil parish of South Wraxall was created in 1894 by combining the former tithings of South Wraxall, Bradford Leigh and Cumberwell which were parts of the extensive ancient parish of Bradford on Avon. The parish gained 1040 acres, and around 170 residents, in 1934 when the parish of Bradford Without was abolished and its area redistributed to the surrounding parishes.

Most of the buildings of South Wraxall are of the 17th and 18th centuries, built from locally quarried dressed stone, or stone rubble construction with stone slates. Besides quarrying, the main occupation around the area was agriculture, including shepherding; there were also weavers in the early 19th century, and some clothworkers by the mid-19th century.

== Manor house ==
South Wraxall Manor is a Grade I listed country house dating from the early 15th century. The manor farmhouse is also Grade I listed. The heirs of Walter Long, 1st Viscount Long sold the house in the 1960s, after several hundred years of continuous ownership, and in 2004 it was bought by the musician John Taylor.

== Parish church ==
St. James' parish church is Grade II* listed. Its tower dates from the early 14th century but the rest has been rebuilt: the north aisle in 1823 by Henry Goodridge, and the chancel and arcade in 1882 in late Perpendicular Gothic style. The six bells in the tower were cast by Abraham Bilbie in 1769, and restored and re-hung in 2022.

Anciently, the church was annexed to Atworth parish, which was a chapelry of Bradford parish church; a perpetual curacy was created for Atworth with South Wraxall in 1847. Sometime before 1975 the benefice of Monkton Farleigh with South Wraxall was created, and in that year a group ministry was established for the wider area. Today the church is one of four in the 'Churches of North Bradford on Avon and Villages' group.

== Amenities ==
There are no longer any shops in the village and the school, built as a National school in 1841, closed in 1972. The school building now serves as the Village Hall. The Longs Arms public house is in the centre of the village. South Wraxall Club is located in Lower South Wraxall.
