= High Sheriff of Wiltshire =

Ceremonial officer in Wiltshire

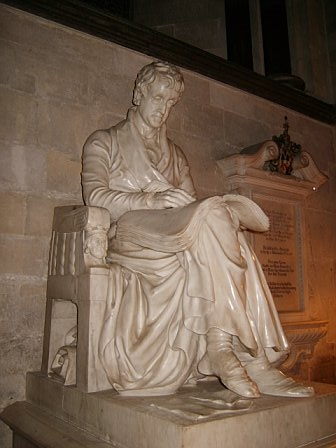
Sir Richard Colt Hoare, Sheriff in 1805, monument in Salisbury Cathedral

This is a list of the sheriffs and (after 1 April 1974) high sheriffs of Wiltshire.

Until the 14th century, the shrievalty was held ex officio by the castellans of Old Sarum Castle.

On 1 April 1974, under the provisions of the Local Government Act 1972, the title of Sheriff of Wiltshire was retitled as High Sheriff of Wiltshire.

== Sheriff ==
=== To 1400 ===
- 1066: Edric
- 1067–1070: Philippe de Buckland
- 1085: Aiulphus the Sheriff
- 1070–1105: Edward of Salisbury
- 1110: William of Pont de L'Arche
- 1119: Edward d'Évreux
- 1120: Humphrey "The Great" De BOHUN (2º B. Bohun of Taterford) – Bearer of the Royal Standard in 1120 in the battle of Benneville in Normandy
- ????: Walter FitzEdward of Salisbury
- 1130: Warin de Lisures or Lisoriis
- ????: "William the Late Sheriff", so called in 1155
- 1152–1159: Patrick of Salisbury, 1st Earl of Salisbury
- 1160–1162: Richard Clericus (Richard de Wilton)
- 1163: Milo de Dauntesey
- 1164–1181: Richard de Wilton or de Wilteshire
- 1181: Michael Belet and Robert Malde (Mauduit)
- 1182: ditto 1181 and Roger Fitz Renfr or Renf
- 1183–1187: Robert Mauduit
- 1189: Hugh Bardolf
- 1190: William of Salisbury, 2nd Earl of Salisbury, son of Patrick
- 1191: Robert de Tregoz
- 1192: William d'Évreux (as above)
- 1193–1197: William d'Évreux (as above) and Thomas d'Évreux (otherwise Devereux) his son
- 1197–1198: Stephen of Thornham and Alexander de Ros
- 1199: Stephen of Thornham and Wandragesil de Courselles
- 1200–1203: William Longespee, 3rd Earl of Salisbury and Robert de Berneres
- 1207: Geoffrey de Neville
- 1210: Robert de Veteriponte (i.e., de Vipont) jointly with Nicholas de Vipont
- 1211–1212: Robert de Veteriponte (i.e., de Vipont)
- 1215–1225: William Longespee, 3rd Earl of Salisbury (died in office)
- 1226: Simon de Hale, or de Hales (previously Sheriff of Yorkshire 1223-5)
- 1227: Ela of Salisbury, 3rd Countess of Salisbury and John Dacus
- 1228: John of Monmouth and Walter de Bumesey
- 1229–1230: John of Monmouth
- 1231–1234: Ela of Salisbury, 3rd Countess of Salisbury and John Dacus
- 1235: Ela of Salisbury, 3rd Countess of Salisbury and Robert de Hogesham
- 1236: Ela of Salisbury, 3rd Countess of Salisbury
- 1237: William Gerebred / Robert de Hogesham
- 1238–1239: Robert de Hogesham
- 1240–1245: Nicholas de Haversham
- 1246–1248: Nicholas de Lusteshull
- 1249–1252: William de Tynchiden
- 1253–1254: William de Tenhide and his son John
- 1255–1257: John de Verund
- 1258–1259: John de Verund and Geoffrey Scudamor (otherwise Scudamore)
- 1260: John de Verund
- 1261–1263: Rad. [i.e. Radulphus otherwise Rafe or Ralph] Cussell
- 1264: Rad. de Aungers and John de Aungers
- 1265: Rad. de Aungers
- 1266–1270: William de Duy and Stephen de Edworth
- 1271: Stephen de Edwarth and Walter de Strichesley
- 1272–1274: Walter de Strichesley
- 1275–1280: Hildebrand of London (otherwise Sir Hildebrand de Londres)
- 1281–1288: John de Wotton
- 1289–1290: Richard de Combe
- 1291–1295: Thomas de St Omero (otherwise de St-Omer)
- 1296–1298: Walter Pavely (otherwise Paveley)
- 1299–1300: John of Newtown
- 1301–1303: John of Hertinger
- 1304: Henry of Cobham
- 1305–1306: John de Gerberge
- 1307: Andreas de Grimstead
- 1308–1309: Alex Cheverell and John de Sto Laudo (otherwise de St Lo or Saint Lowe)
- 1310: William de Harden
- 1311: Adam Walrand
- 1312–1313: Adam Walrand and John Kingston
- 1314: John de Holt and Sir Philip de la Beche
- 1315–1316: Sir Philip de la Beche
- 1317–1319: Walter de Risum
- 1320–1321: Adam de Tichbourne and Adam Walrand
- 1322: Walter le Longe
- 1323–1325: Sir Adam Walrand
- 1327: Sir Adam Walrand
- 1328: Sir Philip de la Beche
- 1329–1331: Sir John Mauduit
- 1332: Gifford le Long
- 1333: John Mauduit and William Randolph
- 1334: John Tichbourne and John Mauduit
- 1335–1336: Gilbert de Berewik and Reginald de Paveley
- 1337: Sir Peter Doynel and Gilbert de Berewik (i.e. de Berwick)
- 1338–1340: John Mauduit
- 1341: Thomas de Sto Mauro (otherwise Seymour) and Robert Lokes
- 1342–1344: John Mauduit
- 1345–1346: John Roches
- 1347: John Roches and Thomas Semor (otherwise Seymour, see also 1341)
- 1348–1350: Robert Russell
- 1350:
- 1351–1353: Thomas de la River
- 1354: John Everard of Stratford-sub-Castle
- 1355–1360: Thomas Hungerford
- 1361–1366: Henry Sturmy
- 1367–1371: Walter de Haywood
- 1372: William de Worston
- 1373: Henry Sturmy
- 1374: Sir John Dauntsey
- 1375: Sir John Delamare
- 1376–1377: Ralph Cheyne
- 1378: Peter de Cusaunce and William de Worston
- 1379–1380: Rad. (i.e. Radulphus) de Norton
- 1381: Laurence de Sco. Martino (otherwise de St Martin) and Hugo Cheyne
- 1382: Nicholas Woodhall
- 1383: Sir Bernard Brocas
- 1384–1385: John Lancaster
- 1386–1387: John Salesbury
- 1388–1389: Ralph Cheyne
- 1390: Richard Mawarden of Stratford sub Castle
- 1391: John Roches
- 1392: Robert Dyneley of Fittleton
- 1393: John Gawen of Norrington
- 1394: Richard Mawarden of Stratford sub Castle
- 1395: Sir John Moigne (or Moyne) of Owermoigne
- 1396: Thomas Bonham
- 1397–1399: Richard Mawarden of Stratford sub Castle
- 1400: John Dauntsey

=== 15th century ===
- 1401: William Worfton of Broad Hinton and John Gawayne
- 1402: William Cheyne of Brooke
- 1403–1404: Walter Beauchamp
- 1405: Walter Hungerford
- 1406: Rad. (i.e. Radulphus for Rafe or Ralph) Grene (otherwise Green)
- 1407: Walter Beauchamp
- 1408: Sir Robert Corbet
- 1409: William Cheyne
- 1410: Sir John Berkeley of Beverston Castle
- 1411: Thomas Bonham
- 1413: Sir Elias Delamere, of Fisherton Delamere
- 1414: Henry Thorpe of Newton Tony
- 1415: Thomas Calstone (otherwise Calston) of Littlecote and Upton Lovell
- 1416: Robert Andrewe (or Andrew)
- 1417: William Finderne
- 1418: Sir William Sturmy, of Wulfhall
- 1419: Thomas Ringwood, of Loveraz Coulesfield
- 1420–1421: William Darell, of Littlecote
- 1422: William Darell, of Littlecote (see 1420)
- 1423: Sir Robert Shotesbrook (or Shottesbrook)
- 1424: William Finderne
- 1425: Walter Pauncefoot
- 1426: John Stourton, of Stourton
- 1427: William Darell, of Littlecote (see 1420)
- 1428: John Pawlet, of Fisherton Delamere
- 1429: Sir John Bayntun, of Fallersdon
- 1430: David Cervington, of Longford Castle
- 1431: Sir John Seymour, of Wulfhall
- 1432: Walter Strickland
- 1433: Sir John Stourton, of Stourton (see 1426)
- 1434: Sir Stephen Popham of Popham
- 1435: Edmund or Edward Hungerford
- 1436: William Beauchamp
- 1437: Sir John Stourton (see 1426)
- 1438: Sir John VI Lisle
- 1439: John St Loe (or Saint Lowe)
- 1440: John Norris
- 1441: Richard Restwold of Crowmarsh Gifford, Oxfordshire and Sindlesham, Berkshire
- 1442: William Beauchamp
- 1443: Sir John Bainton (otherwise Bayntun, see 1429), of Falstone (or Fallersdon) and of Shaw near Melksham
- 1444: John Basket, of Lydiard Millicent
- 1445: Richard Restwold of Crowmarsh Gifford, Oxfordshire and Sindlesham, Berkshire
- 1446: William Stafford
- 1447: William Beauchamp
- 1448: John Norreys
- 1449: Philip Baynard, of Lackham
- 1450: Sir John Seymour of Wulfhall
- 1451: John Nanson
- 1452: Edward Stradling, of Dauntsey
- 1453: John Willoughby, of Brooke Hall near Westbury
- 1454: George Darell, of Littlecote
- 1455: Sir Reginald Stourton, of Stourton
- 1456: Henry Long, of Wraxall
- 1457: Sir John Seymour, of Wulfhall
- 1458: Hugh Pilkenham or Pekenham
- 1459: John Ferris, of Blunsdon St Andrew
- 1461: George Darell
- 1462–1463: Sir Reginald Stourton, of Stourton (see 1456)
- 1464: Sir Roger Tocotes
- 1465: Sir George Darell
- 1466: Sir Thomas de la Mare
- 1467: Christopher Wolsley
- 1468: Sir Richard Darell
- 1469: Sir George Darell
- 1470: Sir Lawrence Raynsford
- 1471: Sir Roger Tocotes
- 1472: Sir Maurice Berkeley
- 1473: Sir John Willoughby
- 1474: William Collingbourne, of Collingbourne Ducis
- 1475: Henry Long of Wraxall
- 1476: Walter Bonham
- 1477: Edward Hartgill
- 1478: John Mompesson, of Bathampton Wyly
- 1479: Walter Hungerford, of Farley Castle
- 1480: Charles Bulkeley
- 1481: William Collingbourne, of Collingbourne Ducis
- 1482: John Mompesson
- 1483: Henry Long of Wraxall
- 1484: Edward Hartgill
- 1485: Sir Roger Tocotes
- 1486: John Wroughton, of Broad Hinton
- 1487: Sir John Turberville (? of Bere Regis, Dorset)
- 1488: Thomas Vinour
- 1489: Sir Edward Darell of Littlecote (1st term)
- 1490: Constantius (i.e. Constantine) Darell, of Collingbourne Ducis
- 1491: John Lye, of Flamstone in Bishopstone
- 1492: John Yorke, of Helthrop, near Ramsbury
- 1493: Sir Edward Darell of Littlecote (2nd term)
- 1494: Richard Puddesey
- 1495: Constantius (i.e. Constantine) Darell, of Collingbourne Ducis
- 1496: George Chaderton (otherwise Chadderton or Chatterton), of Lydiard Millicent
- 1497: Sir Edward Darell of Littlecote (3rd term)
- 1498: Sir George Seymour
- 1499: Sir John Huddlestone
- 1500: Sir Thomas Long, of South Wraxall and Draycot

=== 16th century ===
- 1501: John Yorke
- 1502: Sir William Callaway
- 1503: Sir John Danvers, of Dauntsey
- 1504: John Ernle, of Etchilhampton
- 1505: John Gawayne, of Norrington
- 1506: Sir Thomas Long (see 1500)
- 1507: Sir John Seymour, of Wulfhall
- 1508: John Mompesson
- 1509: Sir Edward Darell of Littlecote (4th term)
- 1510: Sir Walter Hungerford
- 1511: Henry Long of Draycot Cerne (1st term)
- 1512: Sir Christopher Wroughton, of Broad Hinton
- 1513: Sir John Danvers, of Dauntsey
- 1514: William Bonham, of Bonham, at Stourton and Great Wishford
- 1515: Sir John Scrope, of Castle Combe and Oxendon
- 1516: Sir Nicholas Wadham (died 1542) of Merryfield, Somerset and Edge, Devon.
- 1517: Sir Edward Hungerford
- 1518: Sir John Seymour of Wulfhall (see 1507)
- 1519: Sir Edward Darell of Littlecote (5th term)
- 1520: John Skilling, of Draycott Foliat
- 1521: John Ernle (otherwise Erneley), of Bourton, Bishop's Cannings
- 1522: Sir Edward Bayntun, of Bromham
- 1523: Thomas Yorke
- 1524: Sir John Seymour, of Wulfhall (see 1518)
- 1525: Sir Henry Long of Draycot Cerne (2nd term)
- 1526: Sir John Bourchier
- 1527: Sir Anthony Hungerford of Down Ampney, Gloucestershire
- 1528: John Ernle (otherwise Erneley)
- 1529: John Horsey, of Martin
- 1530: Thomas Yorke
- 1531: Thomas Bonham, of Great Wishford
- 1532: John Ernle (otherwise Erneley)
- 1533: Sir Walter Hungerford of Farley Castle
- 1534: Robert Baynard, of Lackham
- 1535: Thomas Yorke (see 1530)
- 1536: Sir Henry Long of Draycot Cerne (3rd term)
- 1537: Sir John Brydges
- 1538: Sir Anthony Hungerford (see 1527)
- 1539: John Ernle (otherwise Erneley), of Bishop's Cannings
- 1540: Edward Mompesson
- 1541: Sir Henry Long of Draycot Cerne (4th term)
- 1542: John Marvyn of Fonthill Gifford (1st term)
- 1543: John Ernle (otherwise Erneley), of Bishop's Cannings
- 1544: Robert Hungerford, of Cadenham
- 1545: Charles Bulkeley
- 1546: Richard Scrope, of Castle Combe
- 1547: Silvester Danvers, of Dauntsey
- 1548: Ambrose Dauntsey
- 1549: John Bonham of Hazelbury
- 1550: John Marvyn of Fonthill Gifford (2nd term)
- 1551: William Stumpe died and replaced by Sir James Stumpe of Charlton and Malmesbury (1st term)
- 1552: Sir William Sharington (or Sherington), of Lacock Abbey (died in office)
- 1553: Edward Baynard, of Lackham
- 1553: John Ernle (otherwise Erneley) of Bishop's Cannings
- 1554: Robert Hungerford of Cadnam (otherwise Cadenham)
- 1555: John St John, of Lydiard Tregoze
- 1556: Sir Anthony Hungerford, of Down Ampney, Gloucestershire
- 1557: Sir Walter Hungerford of Farley Castle
- 1558: Henry Brouncker, of Melksham
- 1558: Sir John Zouche, of Calstone near Calne
- 1559: Sir James Stumpe of Charlton and Malmesbury (2nd term)
- 1559: George Ludlow
- 1560: Sir John Marvyn of Pertwood and Fonthill Gifford (3rd term)
- 1561: George Penruddock of Ivy Church, Laverstock, and Compton Chamberlayne
- 1562: John Ernle (otherwise Erneley) of Bishop's Cannings (see 1553)
- 1563: William Button of Alton Priors
- 1564: John Eyre of Great Chalfield
- 1565: Nicholas Snell of Kington St Michael
- 1566: Henry Sherington, of Lacock Abbey
- 1567: George Ludlow, of Hill Deverill
- 1568: Sir John Thynne of Longleat
- 1569: William Button, of Alton Priors and Stowell
- 1570: Edward Bayntun, of Rowdon
- 1571: John St John, of Lydiard Tregoze (see 1555)
- 1572: Sir Walter Hungerford of Farley Castle (see 1557)
- 1573: Sir John Danvers of Dauntsey
- 1574: Sir Robert Long of Wraxall and Draycott
- 1575: Sir Thomas Wroughton of Broad Hinton
- 1576: Sir John Hungerford, of Down Ampney, Gloucestershire
- 1577: Sir Henry Knyvett, of Charlton
- 1578: Nicholas St John of Lydiard Park, Lydiard Tregoze
- 1579: Michael Ernle (otherwise Erneley), of Bourton, in Bishop's Cannings, and Whetham, Calne
- 1580: William Brouncker of Melksham
- 1581: Sir Walter Hungerford (see 1572)
- 1582: Jasper Moore of Heytesbury
- 1583: John Snell of Kington St Michael
- 1584: Sir John Danvers of Dauntsey (see 1573)
- 1585: Edmund Ludlow of Hill Deverill
- 1586: Richard Moody, of Garsdon, near Malmesbury
- 1587: Sir Walter Hungerford (see 1581)
- 1588: Henry Willoughby, of Knoyle Odierne or West Knoyle
- 1589: John Warneford, of Sevenhampton near Highworth
- 1590: William Eyre of Great Chalfield
- 1591: Sir John Hungerford of Down Ampney, Gloucestershire
- 1592: Sir John Thynne of Longleat and Caus Castle, Shropshire
- 1593: John Hungerford, of Stoke near Great Bedwyn
- 1594: Sir Henry Sadleir (otherwise Sadler or Sadlier) of Everley
- 1595: John Dauntsey, of West Lavington
- 1596: Sir James Mervyn, of Fonthill Gifford
- 1597: Edward Penruddock of Compton Chamberlayne
- 1598: Thomas Snell, of Kington St Michael
- 1599: Walter Vaughan of Falstone House, Bishopstone nr Salisbury
- 1600: Sir Walter Long of South Wraxall and Draycot

=== 17th century ===
- 1601: Henry Bayntun of Bromham House
- 1602: Sir Jasper Moore of Heytesbury
- 1603: Sir Jasper Moore, of Heytesbury
- 1604: Sir Alexander Tutt of Idmiston
- 1605: John Hungerford of Cadnam, Bremhill
- 1606: Gabriel Pile
- 1607: Sir Thomas Thynne, of Longleat
- 1608: Richard Goddard, of Standon Hussey
- 1609: John Ayliffe, of Brinkworth and Grittenham
- 1610: Sir Giles Wroughton, of Broad Hinton
- 1611: Sir William Button, 1st Baronet, of Alton Priors and of Tockenham Court, Lyneham
- 1612: Francis Popham, of Littlecote
- 1613: Sir William Pawlett, of Edington
- 1614: Henry Mervyn of Pertwood and Fonthill Giffard
- 1615: Thomas Moore, of Heytesbury
- 1616: Sir Richard Grobham, of Great Wishford, Berwick St Leonard and Nettleton
- 1617: Sir John Horton, of Iford and Westwood
- 1618: Sir Henry Moody of Garsdon, near Malmesbury
- 1619: Sir Henry Poole of Oaksey
- 1620: Sir Charles Pleydell, of Midgehall in Lydiard Tregoze
- 1621: Sir William Pawlett, of Edington
- 1622: Sir John Lambe, of Coulston
- 1623: Gifford Long of Rowde Ashton
- 1624: Edward Reade, of Corsham
- 1625: Sir Francis Seymour
- 1626: Sir Giles Estcourt, 1st Baronet of Long Newnton
- 1627: Sir Walter Long, Bt of Whaddon
- 1628: John Duckett, of Hartham near Corsham
- 1629: Sir Robert Baynard of Lackham
- 1630: John Topp of Stockton
- 1631: Sir Edward Hungerford of Corsham and Farleigh Hungerford
- 1632: Sir John St John, of Lydiard Tregoze
- 1633: Sir Henry Ludlow, of Maiden Bradley
- 1634: Francis Goddard, of Standon Hussey and Cliffe Pypard
- 1635: Sir George Ayliffe, of Foxley and Grittenham in Brinkworth
- 1636: Sir Nevil Poole, of Poole Keynes
- 1637: Sir Edward Bayntun of Bromham House, Bromham
- 1638: John Grubbe, of Potterne and Cherhill
- 1639: John Duke, of Lake
- 1640: Giles Eyre, of Brickworth
- 1641: Robert Chivers, of Calne, Quemerford, and Leigh Delamere
- 1642: Sir George Vaughan, of Fallersdon
- 1643: Sir John Penruddocke, of Compton Chamberlayne
- 1644: Sir James Long, Bt, of Draycot Cerne
- 1645: Edmund Ludlow, of Hill Deverill, and Alexander Thistlethwaite, of Winterslow
- 1646: Sir Henry Chalk (?Choke)
- 1647: Sir Anthony Ashley-Cooper, Bt
- 1648: Edward Tooker, of Maddington
- 1649: William Calley, of Burderop
- 1650: Thomas Bond of Ogbourne St George
- 1651: Lawrence Washington of Garsdon, near Malmesbury
- 1652: Sir Henry Clerk, of Enford near Amesbury
- 1653: Thomas Long, of Little Cheverell
- 1654: Hugh Audley (otherwise Awdley), of Colepark, Malmesbury
- 1655: John Dove, of Salisbury
- 1656: Robert Hippesley, of Stanton Fitzwarren near Highworth
- 1657: (?Robert) Hippesley
- 1658: John Ernle of Bourton in Bishop's Cannings and of Whetham in Calne
- 1659: Isaac Burgess
- 1660: Edward Horton, of Great Chaldfield, near Bradford
- 1661: Sir James Thynne of Longleat
- 1662: Sir Walter Ernle, 1st Baronet of Etchilhampton
- 1663: Sir Henry Coker, of Hill Deverill
- 1664: Sir Edward Bayntun of Bromham
- 1665: Thomas Mompesson, of Corton in Boyton
- 12 November 1665: Sir John Weld, of Compton Bassett
- 7 November 1666: Christopher Willoughby, of Bishopstone
- 6 November 1667: John Long, of Little Cheverell
- 6 November 1668: Sir Richard Howe, of Berwick St Leonard
- 11 November 1669: John Hall, of Bradford-on-Avon
- 4 November 1670: Sir Robert Button, 3rd Baronet, of Tockenham Court, Lyneham
- 9 November 1671: Sir Walter Long, 1st Baronet, of Whaddon
- 11 November 1672: Walter Smith, of Shalbourne and Great Bedwyn
- 12 November 1673: Bernard Pawlett, of Cottles, near Bradford
- 5 November 1674: Thomas Goddard, of Swindon
- 15 November 1675: Sir Matthew Andrews, of Mere
- 10 November 1676: Giles Earl
- 18 November 1676: Richard Hart
- 23 November 1676: John Hawkins, of Ashton Keynes
- 17 November 1677: Henry Chivers, of Calne and Quemerford
- 14 November 1678: John Hawkins, of Ashton Keynes
- 13 November 1679: Giles Earle
- late 1679: Thomas Earle, of Eastcourt House, Crudwell
- 4 November 1680: John Jacob
- 1681: Thomas Gore, of Alderton
- 1682: Richard Lewis, of Edington
- 1683: Sir Edmund Warneford of Sevenhampton near Highworth
- 1684: George Willoughby of Bishopstone
- 1685: (John Davenant: altered to) William Chafyn, of Zeals Monachorum
- 1686: John Davenant, of Landford in Frustfield Hundred
- 1687: Richard Chaundler of Idmiston
- 1688: Sir Jeremy Craye
- 1689: John Wyndham of Norrington
- 1690: (James Blatch: altered to) Stephen Blatch, of Westbury
- 1691: Henry Wallis, of Trowbridge
- 1692: Henry Nourse (altered to Sir William Pynsent, Bt, and again to Henry Nourse)
- 1693: Sir Thomas Estcourt, of Sherston Pinkney
- 1694: Sir William Pynsent, Bt of Urchfont
- 1695: Gifford Yerbury
- 1696: Joseph Houlton, of Trowbridge
- 1697: John Benett, of Norton Bavant
- 1698: Thomas Baskerville, (? of Richardston near Winterbourne Basset)
- 1699: (Walter Ernle: altered to) John Kyrle (otherwise Curll), of Turley near Bradford
- 1700: (Joseph Houlton: altered to) Francis Merewether of Easterton, Market Lavington

=== 18th century ===
- 1701: Richard Jones of Ramsbury
- 1702: (William Willoughby: altered to) Christopher Willoughby, of West Knoyle
- 1703: Richard Long of Collingbourne
- 1704: Walter Long of South Wraxall
- 1705: John Flower, of Grimstead, or of Worton, near Devizes
- 1706: (Thomas Blatch: altered to) Andrew Duke, of Bulford
- 1707: Sir James Ashe, 2nd Baronet
- 1708: Francis Kenton
- 1709: (Oliver Calley: altered to) Walter Ernle, of Conock, Chirton
- 1710: William Benson of Amesbury
- 1711: Daniel Webb of Monkton Farleigh
- 1712: John Cox of Kemble, near Malmesbury
- 1713: John Smith, of Alton Priors
- 1714: Richard Goddard of Swindon
- 1715: Matthew Pitts, of Salisbury
- 1716: John Eyles, of Devizes
- 1717: Robert Houlton replaced by Calthorpe Parker Long then Thomas Bennett of Steeple Ashton
- 1718: George Speke Petty, of Cheney Court and Haselbury House, Box
- 1719: John Askew, of Lydiard Millicent
- 1720: Caleb Bayley replaced by John Vilett, of Swindon
- 1721: Henry Read, of Crowood
- 1722: Edward Hill, of Wanborough
- 1723: Ralph Freke, of Hannington, near Highworth
- 1724: Joseph Houlton, of Farleigh Hungerford, Somerset, and Grittleton, Wiltshire
- 1725: John Hippesley, of Stanton Fitzwarren
- 1726: Henry Long, of Melksham
- 1727: John Mills, of Cherhill, Calne replaced by William Coleman
- 1728: Walter Hungerford of Studley House, Calne
- 1729: Henry Hungerford, of Fyfield, Milton Lislebonne
- 1730: Ezekiel Wallace (or Wallis), of Lucknam, Colerne
- 1731: Henry Skilling, of Draycott Foliat
- 1732: John Smith, of Whitley, Calne
- 1733: Job Polden, of Imber
- 1734: Thomas Phipps, of Westbury Leigh and Chalford
- 1735: William Vilett, of Swindon
- 1736: Richard Baskerville, of Berwick Bassett
- 1736: Edward Mortimer, of Trowbridge
- 1737: William Hedges of Compton Bassett
- 1738: Isaac Warriner, of Conock, Chirton
- 1739: William Wyndham, of Dinton
- 1740: Edward Mortimer, of Trowbridge (or William Wyndham?)
- 1741: Anthony Guy, of Chippenham
- 1742: William Batt, of Salisbury
- 1743: John or William Hippesley, of Stanton Fitzwarren
- 1744: (John Walters of Titherley: altered to) Fulke Greville, of Wilbury House, Newton Toney
- 1745: Walter Long, of Salisbury, Wiltshire, and Preshaw, Hampshire
- 1746: Godfrey Huckle Kneller, of Donhead Hall, Donhead St Mary
- 1747: William Phipps, of Heywood
- 1748: Thomas Phipps, of Westbury Leigh
- 1749: Thomas Cooper, of Salisbury
- 1750: James Bartlett, of Salisbury
- 1751: Charles Penruddocke, of Compton Chamberlayne
- 1752: Thomas Cooper, of Cumberwell, near Bradford
- 1753: Edward Polhill, of Heale House, Woodford, near Salisbury
- 1754: William Phipps, of Westbury Leigh
- 1755: Arthur Evans, of the Close, Salisbury
- 1756: John Jacob, of Tockenham Wick House, Lyneham
- 1757: William Coles, of the Close, Salisbury
- 1758: Thomas Bennett (otherwise Benett), of Pyt House
- 1759: William Norris, of Nonesuch House, Bromham
- 1760: George Flower, of Devizes
- 1761: Scrope (otherwise Scroop) Egerton, of Salisbury
- 1762: Prince Sutton, of Devizes
- 1763: John Talbot of Lacock Abbey
- 1764: Walter Long (of South Wraxall)
- 1765: Benjamin Adamson, of Kemble
- 1766: Edward Medlicott, of Warminster
- 1767: Edward Goddard, of Cliffe Pypard
- 1768: Edmund Lambert, of Boyton
- 1769: William Talk, of Salisbury (New Sarum)
- 1770: Thomas Maundrell, of Blacklands, near Calne
- 1771: William Langham, of Ramsbury Manor
- 1772: Henry Penruddocke Wyndham, of the College, Salisbury
- 1773: Edward Poore, of Rushall
- 1774: Thomas Estcourt, of Newnton
- 1775: Francis Dugdale Astley, of Everley
- 1776: William Northey, of the Ivy House, Chippenham
- 1777: Joseph Colborne, of Hardenhuish, Chippenham
- 1778: William Beach, of Nether Avon House
- 1779: Robert Cooper, of Salisbury
- 1780: Paul Cobb Methuen of Corsham House
- 1781: William Hayter, of Newton Toney
- 1782: William Bowles, of Heale House
- 1783: Thomas Hussey, of Salisbury
- 1784: William Chaffin Grove of Zeals House, Mere
- 1785: James Sutton of New Park, Devizes [or of Roundway]
- 1786: Seymour Wroughton, of Eastcott, Urchfont
- 1787: Isaac William Webb Horlock, of Ashwick, Marshfield, Gloucestershire
- 1788: Robert Ashe, of Langley Burrell
- 1789: Thomas Grove, of Ferne
- 1790: Gifford Warriner, of Conock, Chirton
- 1791: John Awdry, of Notton, Lacock
- 1792: Matthew Humphries, of the Ivy House, Chippenham
- 1793: John Gaisford, of Iford House, near Bradford
- 1794: Richard Godolphin Long, of Rood Ashton
- 1795: James Montagu, of Alderton and Lackham
- 1796: Gilbert Trowe Beckett Turner, of Penley House, Westbury
- 1797: Sir John Methuen Poore, 1st Bt. of Rushall
- 1798: John Benett of Pyt House
- 1799: Edward Hinxman, of Little Durnford
- 1800: George Yalden Fort, of Alderbury

=== 19th century ===
- 11 February 1801: Thomas Bush, of Bradford
- 3 February 1802: Sir Andrew Bayntun-Rolt, 2nd Baronet, of Spye Park
- 3 February 1803: Thomas Henry Hele Phipps, of Leighton House, Westbury
- 1 February 1804: Wadham Locke, of Rowde Ford
- 6 February 1805: Sir Richard Colt Hoare, 2nd Baronet, of Stourhead
- 1 February 1806: John Paul Paul, of Ashton Keynes
- 4 February 1807: Thomas Calley, of Burderop Park
- 3 February 1808: John Houlton, of Grittleton
- 6 February 1809: Sir Charles Warre Malet, 1st Baronet, of Wilbury House
- 31 January 1810: Abraham Ludlow, of Heywood House
- 8 February 1811: Harry Biggs, of Stockton
- 24 January 1812: Sir William Pierce Ashe A'Court, 1st Baronet, of Heytesbury House
- 10 February 1813: William Fowle, of Chute, Wiltshire
- 4 February 1814: William Wyndham, of Dinton, Wiltshire
- 13 February 1815: George Eyre, of Bramshaw
- 1816: John Hussey, of Salisbury
- 1817: John Hungerford Penruddocke, of Compton Chamberlayne
- 1818: Alexander Powell, of Hurdcott
- 1819: John Long, of Monkton Farleigh
- 1820: Ambrose Goddard, of Swindon
- 1821: Ambrose Awdry, of Seend, near Devizes
- 1822: Edward Phillips, of Melksham
- 1823: John Fuller, of Neston Park, Corsham
- 1824: Sir Edward Poore Bt, of Rushall
- 1825: Ernle Warriner, of Conock, Chirton
- 1826: Thomas Clutterbuck, of Hardenhuish
- 1827: Thomas Baskerville Mynors Baskerville, of Rockley House, near Marlborough
- 1828: George Wroughton Wroughton, of Wilcot House, near Pewsey
- 1829: George Heneage Walker Heneage, of Compton Bassett
- 1830: Edward William Leyborne Popham, of Littlecote House
- 1831: Paul Methuen, of Corsham House
- 1832: Sir Edmund Antrobus, 2nd Baronet, of Amesbury
- 1833: William Temple, of Bishopstrow, Warminster
- 1834: Thomas Bolton, of Brickworth
- 1835: Henry Seymour, of Knoyle
- 1836: Sir John Dugdale Astley, 1st Baronet, of Everley
- 1837: Sir Frederick Hutchison Hervey Bathurst, 3rd Baronet, of Clarendon
- 1838: Thomas Assheton Smith, of Tedworth House, near Ludgershall
- 1839: Charles Lewis Phipps, of Wans House
- 1840: William Henry Fox Talbot, of Lacock Abbey
- 1841: Ambrose Hussey, of Salisbury
- 1842: Frederick William Rooke, of Lackham
- 1843: Henry Stephen Olivier, of Potterne
- 1844: George Edward Eyre, or Warrens, Bramshaw
- 1845: Wade Browne, of Monkton Farleigh
- 1846: The Right Honourable Jacob Pleydell Bouverie, Viscount Folkestone, of Longford Castle
- 1847: Wadham Locke, of Ashton Giffard
- 1848: John Henry Campbell Wyndham, of The College, Salisbury
- 1849: Robert Parry Nisbet, of South Broom House, Devizes
- 1850: Henry Gaisford Gibbs Ludlow, of Heywood House, Westbury
- 1851: Graham Moore Michell Esmeade, of Monkton, Chippenham
- 1852: John Bird Fuller, of Neston Park, Corsham
- 1853: Francis Leybourne Popham, of Chilton
- 1854: Edmund Lewis Clutterbuck, of Hardenhuish
- 1855: Simon Watson Taylor of Urchfont
- 1856: Charles William Miles, of Burton Hill House, Malmesbury
- 1857: Alfred Morrison, of Fonthill
- 1858: Francis Alexander Sydenham Locke, of Rowdeford
- 1859: John Neilson Gladstone, of Bowdon Park
- 1860: Horatio Nelson Goddard, of Cliffe Manor House, Cliffe Pypard
- 1861: Charles Penruddocke, of Compton Chamberlayne
- 1862: John Elton Mervyn Prower, of Purton House, Purton, near Swindon
- 1863: Thomas Fraser Grove, of Ferne
- 1864: John Lewis Phipps, of Leighton House, Westbury
- 1865: Thomas Henry Allen Poynder, of Hartham Park, near Chippenham
- 1866: Ambrose Denis Hussey-Freke, of Hannington Hall, Highworth
- 1867: Henry Calley, of Burderop Park
- 1868: Charles John Thomas Conolly, of Cottles House, near Melksham
- 1869: Ralph Ludlow Lopes, of Sandridge Park, Melksham
- 1870: John Ravenhill, of Ashton Gifford House
- 1871: John William Gooch Spicer, of Spye Park
- 1872: Sir John Neald, of Grittleton House
- 1873: Nathaniel Barton, of Corsley House, Warminster
- 1874: Edward Chaddock Lowndes, of Castle Combe
- 1875: Charles Paul Phipps, of Chalcot, Westbury
- 1876: William Henry Poynder of Hartham, Chippenham
- 1877: Richard Walmesley of Lucknam
- 1878: George Pargiter Fuller
- 1879: William Stancomb of Blount's Court, Devizes
- 1880: Sir Edward Antrobus, of Amesbury
- 1881: George Morrison of Hampworth Lodge, Downton, Salisbury
- 1882: Edward Pleydell-Bouverie, of The Manor House, Market Lavington
- 1883: Sir Michael Robert Shaw-Stewart, Bt, of Fonthill Abbey, Salisbury
- 1884: Richard Leckonby Hothersall Phipps, of Leighton, Westbury
- 1885: Charles Edward Hungerford Athol Colston, of Roundway Park, Devizes
- 1886: Sir Henry Bruce Meux, 3rd Baronet, of Dauntsey House, Chippenham
- 1887: Clement Walker Heneage, of Compton Bassett, Calne
- 1888: Charles Nicholas Paul Phipps, of Chalcot, Westbury
- 1889: John Edmund Philip Spicer, of Spye Park, Chippenham
- 1890: Sir John Poynder Dickson of Hartham Park, Corsham
- 1891: Herbert James Harris, of Bowden Hill House, Chippenham,
- 1892: Sir John William Kelk, 2nd Baronet
- 1893: Sir Gabriel Goldney, 1st Baronet
- 1894: William Henry Laverton
- 1895: Charles Walker
- 1896: Percy Wyndham
- 1897: Sir John Gladstone, 4th Baronet
- 1898: Sir William Roger Brown, of Highfield, Trowbridge
- 1899: Lieutenant-Colonel Wyatt William Turner, of Pinkney Park, Malmesbury
- 1900: Mark Hanbury Beaufoy, of Coombe House, Shaftesbury

=== 20th century ===
- 1901: Charles Awdry of Shaw Hill, Melksham
- 1902: Edmund Clerke Schomberg of Clyffe Hall, Market Lavington
- 1903: George Llewellen Palmer of Lackham, Lacock, Chippenham
- 1904: Hugh Morrison, of Fonthill, Tisbury
- 1905: Lieutenant-Colonel Sir Audley Dallas Neeld, of Grittleton
- 1906: Sir Gabriel Prior Goldney, 2nd Baronet, of Hardenhuish Park, Chippenham
- 1907: Fitzroy Pleydell Goddard, of The Lawn, Swindon
- 1908: Frederick Hastings Goldney, of Beechfield, Corsham
- 1909: Captain George Hounsom Fort, of Alderbury House
- 1910: Sir John Tankerville Goldney, of Monks Park, Corsham
- 1911: William Stancomb, of Blount's Court, Devizes
- 1912: Sir William Heward Bell
- 1913: Charles Penruddocke
- 1914: George Simon Arthur Watson-Taylor, of Erlestoke Park
- 1915: Sir Henry Hugh Arthur-Hoare, 6th Baronet of Stourhead
- 1916: George William Wynter Blathwayt, of Melksham House, Melksham
- 1917: John Moulton
- 1918: Eustace Richardson-Cox
- 1919: Walter Richard Shaw-Stewart
- 1920: Louis George Greville of Heale House, Upper Woodford
- 1921: Sir Frederick George Panizzi Preston of Landford Manor
- 1922: Charles Garnett of Greathouse, Kington Langley
- 1923: Bertram Erasmus Philipps of Dinton House, Dinton
- 1924: Washington Merritt Grant Singer
- 1925: Major Gerard James Buxton of Tockenham Manor, Swindon
- 1926: Major Robert Fleetwood Fuller of Great Chalfield, Melksham
- 1927: Lieut-Col Edgar Hugh Brassey of Dauntsey Park, Chippenham
- 1928: Robert William Awdry of Little Cheverell, Wilts
- 1929: Lieut-Col Arthur Carlton Nicholson of Hartham Park, Corsham, Wilts
- 1930: Vice-Admiral John Luce of Little Cheverell House, Devizes
- 1931: Claude Basil Fry, of Hannington Hall, Highworth
- 1932: William Cory Heward Bell
- 1933: Lieut-Col. William Llewellen Palmer of Rushmore Park, Salisbury
- 1934: Brigadier-General Edward Harding-Newman of Portway House, Warminster
- 1935: Herbert Paton Holt of Manor House, Great Somerford, Chippenham
- 1936: George Jardine Kidston
- 1937: Frederick George Glyn Bailey
- 1938: John Granville Morrison, created Lord Margadale in 1965
- 1939: John Morley
- 1940: Rupert Stephens
- 1941: Lieutenant-Colonel Frederick George Glyn Bailey, of Lake House, Salisbury
- 1942: William Herbert Lee Ewart
- 1943: Sir Eric Clare Edmund Phipps
- 1944: William Llewellen Palmer
- 1945: Brudenell Hunt-Grubbe
- 1946: Lieutenant-Colonel Arthur Edward Phillips, of Elm House, Winterbourne Dauntsey
- 1947: Egbert Cecil Barnes of Hungerdown, Seagry
- 1948: Claude Alexander Codrington of Wroughton House, Swindon
- 1949: Samuel Vandeleur Christie-Miller of Clarendon House, Clarendon Park, Salisbury
- 1950: Roger Money-Kyrle of Whetham House, Whetham, Calne
- 1951: Brigadier Francis Ernle Fowle of The Manor, Charlton St. Peter
- 1952: Guy Elland Carne Rasch
- 1953: Sir Noel Arkell
- 1954: Charles Edwin Awdry, of Notton Lodge, Lacock
- 1955: Sir Geoffrey Ronald Codrington of Roche Court, Winterslow
- 1956: Christopher Herbert Fleetwood Fuller
- 1957: Arthur Guy Stratton of Manor House, Alton Priors
- 1958: Sir Geoffrey Ernest Tritton, 3rd Baronet, of Stanton House, Highworth, Swindon.
- 1959: Hugh Trefusis Brassey, of Manor Farm, Little Somerford, Chippenham
- 1960: Major David Adwyne Carne Rasch of Heale House, Middle Woodford
- 1961: Major-General George Drew Fanshawe of Farley Farm House, Farley
- 1962: Charles Murray Floyd
- 1963: Peter Thomas Wellesley Sykes
- 1964: Arthur Frank Seton Sykes
- 1965: Geoffrey Henry Barrington Chance
- 1966: Christopher Henry Maxwell Peto
- 1967: Frank Harold Elcho Skyrme
- 1968: Anthony William Allen Llewellen Palmer (born 1912)
- 1969: Edward Lancelot Luce
- 1970: Captain Roger Edward Lennox Harvey, of Parliament Piece, Ramsbury
- 1971: James Ian Morrison
- 1972: Nigel Bailey
- 1973: William Erskine Stobart Whetherly of Hallam, Ogbourne St George,

== High Sheriff ==
=== 20th century ===
- 1974: Martin Anthony Gibbs of Sheldon Manor, Chippenham
- 1975: Captain Robert Henry Heywood-Lonsdale, of Bapton Manor, near Warminster
- 1976: Gerald John Ward, of Park Farm, Chilton Foliat, Hungerford, Berkshire
- 1977: Major Anthony Richard Tumor, of Foxley Manor, Malmesbury
- 1978: Count Jan Badeni, of Norton Manor, Malmesbury
- 1979: John Michael Stratton, of Manor Farm, Stockton
- 1980: Major Peter Sturgis, of Church Lodge, Dauntsey Park, Chippenham
- 1981: Richard Flower Stratton, of "Seagrams", Kingston Deverill
- 1982: Samuel George Davenport, of Codford St Mary
- 1983: John Heatley Noble, of Puckshipton House, near Pewsey
- 1984: Major General John Humphrey Stephen Bowring, of Lower Swillbrook Farm, Minety
- 1985: Lieut-Colonel John Godfrey Jeans, of Chalke Pyt House, Broadchalke
- 1986: Arthur Peter Bedingfeld Scott, of Grange Farm, Maiden, Devizes
- 1987: Tristram Seton Sykes, of Norrington Manor, Alvediston
- 1988: Bonar Hugh Charles Sykes, of Conock Manor, Devizes
- 1989: Beresford Norman Gibbs, of Flintham House, Oaksey
- 1990: Nigel James Moffatt Anderson, of Hamptworth Lodge, Landford
- 1991: Christopher Eliot Eliot-Cohen, of Hilldrop Farm, Ramsbury
- 1992: George William Michael Street, of The Dairy House, Berwick St James
- 1993: Lieutenant-General Sir Maurice Johnston
- 1994: Anna Ruth Grange, of Thomhill Farm, Malmesbury
- 1995: David John Randolph, of West Foscote Farm, Grittleton
- 1996: Andrew William Michael Christie-Miller, of Clarendon Park
- 1997: John Barnard Bush
- 1998: Lady Hawley, Little Cheverell House, Devizes
- 1999: Philip John Miles, of Middle Farm, Stanley
- 2000: Robert Lawton

=== 21st century ===
- 2001: Richard David Stratton, Manor Farm, Kingston Deverill
- 2002: Sir Christopher Benson
- 2003: David Newbigging
- 2004: James Arkell
- 2005: David Margesson
- 2006: Elizabeth Geraldine Wimble
- 2007: Peter Pleydell-Bouverie
- 2008: Margaret Madeline Wilks, of Pewsey
- 2009: Robert Charles Floyd of Great Chalfield Manor
- 2010: Dame Elizabeth Louise Neville
- 2011: Robert Ralph Scrymgeour Hiscox of Marlborough
- 2012: Laura, Lady Phillips
- 2013: William Francis Wyldbore-Smith
- 2014: Peter John Gerald Addington of Hilmarton, Calne
- 2015: Lady Gooch of Chitterne, Warminster
- 2016: David Kim Hempleman-Adams of Box, Corsham
- 2017: Lady Marland of Odstock, Salisbury
- 2018: Nicola (Nicky) Alberry of Calne
- 2019: David Bedingfeld Scott of Nursteed, Devizes
- 2020: Major-General Ashley Truluck of Salisbury
- 2021: Sir Charles Hobhouse, of Monkton Farleigh, Bradford-on-Avon
- 2022: Fiona Petty-Fitzmaurice, Marchioness of Lansdowne of Calne
- 2023: Pradeep Bhardwaj of Wroughton, Swindon
- 2024: Dr Susan Olivia Chapple, near Salisbury
- 2025: Martin John Nye, of Chippenham
- 2026: Alexander Paul Lamy Goodwin

== See also ==
- Lord Lieutenant of Wiltshire
- List of Deputy Lieutenants of Wiltshire
- Custos Rotulorum of Wiltshire
