= William Button =

William Button may refer to:

- William I Button (died 1264), Bishop of Bath and Wells
- William II Button (died 1274), Bishop of Bath and Wells
- William Button (died 1547), MP for Chippenham
- William Button (1526–1591), member of the Parliament of England for Marlborough
- Sir William Button, 1st Baronet (c. 1584–1655), of the Button baronets, MP for Wiltshire and Morpeth
- William Butten or Button (died 1620), Mayflower passenger
- Sir William Button, 2nd Baronet (c. 1614–1660), of the Button baronets
- William Stammers Button (1795–1876), English settler in Tasmania; first mayor of Launceston
- William Robert Button (1895–1921), American Medal of Honor recipient
- William John Button (died 1969), British Empire Gallantry Medal recipient

== See also ==
- Button (surname)
