= Button (surname) =

Button is an English surname. The name is generally held to be occupational, for people involved in making or selling buttons, a word derived from the Old French bo(u)ton. However, other origins are possible. For example, a family which produced three bishops and a baronetcy, see below under William Button, derived their name from the village of Bitton in South Gloucestershire. Notable people with the name include:

People:

- Angie Chen Button (born 1954), American politician and business executive
- Archibald Button (1770–unknown), English cricketer
- Arthur Button (RAF officer) (1916–1991), British Royal Air Force air vice-marshal
- Arthur Button (cricketer) (1815–1870), English cricketer
- Brian Button (born 1984), American professional wrestler and bodybuilder best known as Brian Cage
- Charles Button (1838–1920), New Zealand lawyer, judge and politician
- Craig Button (born 1963), former National Hockey League executive and current analyst for NHL Tonight
- Craig D. Button (1964–1997), US Air Force pilot who crashed under strange circumstances
- Daniel E. Button (1917–2009), US representative from New York
- David Button (born 1989), English football goalkeeper
- Dick Button (1929–2025), American figure skater and skating analyst
- Ernest Button, New Zealand rugby league player in the 1910s
- Fiona Button (born 1986), English stage and television actress
- Hannah Button (born 1996), Australian rules footballer
- Ian Button (born 1962), English guitarist
- Jack Button (1940–1996), National Hockey League executive
- Jemmy Button (c. 1815–1864), a native of Tierra del Fuego taken to England
- Jen Button (born 1977), Canadian retired swimmer
- Jenson Button (born 1980), British Formula One driver
- Jimmy Button (born 1973), American professional motocross racer
- John Button (disambiguation)
- Kenneth Button (disambiguation)
- Peter Button (c. 1929–1987), New Zealand pioneering rescue helicopter pilot
- Ralph Button (died 1680), English academic and clergyman
- Robert Young Button (1899–1977), Attorney General of Virginia from 1945 to 1961.
- A. Ronald Button (1903–1987), American politician and California State Treasurer
- Stephen Decatur Button (1813–1897), American architect
- Thomas Button, (died 1634), Welsh officer of the Royal Navy and explorer
- William Button (disambiguation)
- Zachariah Button, English amateur cricketer known to have played between 1793 and 1796

Fictional characters:

- Benjamin Button, the title character of both The Curious Case of Benjamin Button (short story) and film
- Ruby Button, from the soap opera Hollyoaks, played by Anna Shaffer
- Duncan Button, (brother of Ruby), from Hollyoaks, played by Dean Aspen

== See also ==
- Button (disambiguation)
