= Stourton =

Stourton (pronunciation: /ˈstɜːrtən/) may refer to:

== People with the surname ==
- Arthur Stourton (died 1558), English courtier
- Baron Stourton
- Edward Stourton (1957—2026), British broadcaster
- Erasmus Stourton (1603–1658), English clergyman and Newfoundland settler
- Ivo Stourton (born 1982), British author and solicitor
- John Stourton (1899–1992), British politician
- Sir Reginald Stourton (1434–?), English knight
- Tom Stourton (born 1987), English actor, comedian and writer

== Places ==
- Stourton, Staffordshire
- Stourton, Warwickshire
- Stourton, West Yorkshire, area of Leeds
- Stourton, Wiltshire
- Stourton Caundle, Dorset
- Stourton Park, home of Stourbridge R.F.C.

== Other uses ==
- Stourton, a fictional country house in 1941 novel Random Harvest

== See also ==
- Sturton (disambiguation)
- Stoughton (disambiguation)
