= Brandling =

Brandling is a surname of English origin. People with that name include:

- Brandling of Newcastle, an English family of politicians, merchants, and land and coal owners

- Sir Francis Brandling (1595–1641), English landowner and politician
- Robert Brandling (1575–1636), English landowner and politician

== See also ==
- Brandling Junction Railway, an early railway in Co. Durham, England, connected with the Brandling family
- Eisenia fetida, a species of earthworm, one of whose common names is brandling
