= Butan =

Perhaps you are looking for one of the following:

- Bhutan, a country in the Himalayas, Asia
- Butane, a chemical compound
- Marc Butan, American film director
- Butuan, a city in the Philippines
- Button (disambiguation)
