= Button (disambiguation) =

A button is a small fastener which secures two pieces of fabric together.

Button or Buttons may also refer to:

== Controls ==
- Button (computing), a virtual control displayed on a computer screen that can control software
- Push-button, a switch meant to control a machine or a process
- Web button, or button graphic, a digital image used to represent a link to a specific web location

== Arts and entertainment ==
- The Button (comics), a comic book cross-over event
- The Button (TV series)
- Button (film), a 1982 Soviet animated film
- Buttons (film), a 1927 American film
- "Buttons" (The Pussycat Dolls song), from PCD
- "Buttons" (Sia song), from Some People Have Real Problems
- "Buttons", a song by Steve Lacy from Gemini Rights
- Buttons (pantomime), a character in the Cinderella pantomime
- Buttons, of Buttons and Mindy, a cartoon dog from the children's TV show Animaniacs

== Sports and games ==
- Button (curling), the center of the playing surface in the sport of curling
- Button (poker), a marker indicating which player is currently the dealer
- The Button (Reddit), a meta-game and social experiment

== Places ==
- Button Bay, Lake Champlain, Vermont, United States
- Button Island (Massachusetts), United States
- Button Islands, Nunavut, Canada
- Button Township, Ford County, Illinois, United States
- The Buttons, Argentine islands

== Biology ==
- Buttons (plant), several genera of plants in the family Asteraceae
- Button mushroom, sometimes shortened to just "button"
- The initial segment formed in the development of a rattlesnake's rattle

== People and fictional characters ==
- Button (surname), an English surname, including a list of people and fictional characters
- Button Gwinnett (1735–1777), a signer of the United States Declaration of Independence
- Charlie Buttons (1944–2025), an American Jewish community representative
- Red Buttons (1919–2006), stage name of American comedian and actor Aaron Chwatt
- Buttons Briggs (1875–1911), American Major League Baseball pitcher nicknamed "Buttons"

== Other uses ==
- Button baronets, an extinct title (1622–1712) in the Baronetage of England
- The Button (sculpture), on the campus of the University of Pennsylvania
- Button railway station, Button, Manitoba, Canada
- Button's Coffee House London, England
- Cadbury Buttons, packets of button-shaped pieces of chocolate sold in the UK
- Candy Buttons, small rounded flat pegs of candy that are attached to a strip of paper
- Pin-back button, a clothing accessory worn as a badge

== See also ==
- Button, Button (disambiguation)
- Buton, Indonesia
