= Sturmy =

Sturmy is a surname. Notable people with the surname include:

- William Sturmy (died 1427), English politician
- Robert Sturmy, 15th-century beach merchant
