= Thomas Gore (disambiguation) =

Thomas Gore (1870–1949) was an American senator from Oklahoma.

Thomas Gore may also refer to:

- Thomas Gore (writer) (1632–1684), English writer on heraldry
- Thomas Gore (MP) (c. 1694–1777), English politician from Berkshire
- Thomas Jefferson Gore (1839–1923), American Australian Churches of Christ minister
- Tommy Gore (born 1953), English footballer
