= John Button =

John Button may refer to:

== Politicians ==
- John Button (Australian politician)
- John Bolton (Haverfordwest MP) (by 1524–56 or later), or John Button, English politician, MP for Haverfordwest
- John Button (1624–1679), English politician who sat in the House of Commons at various times between 1659 and 1679 for Lymington
- John Button (Parliamentarian) (died 1665), English politician who sat in the House of Commons at various times between 1625 and 1648 for Lymington

== Others ==
- John Button (artist) (1929–1982), American artist
- John Button (campaigner) (born 1944), Western Australian victim of a miscarriage of justice
- John Button (racing driver) (1943–2014), British rallycross driver and father of Jenson Button
- John Button (soldier) (1772–1861), Canadian soldier (Captain) and founder of the 1st York Light Dragoons
- John Button, of the Button baronets

== See also ==
- Button (surname)
