= James Marvyn =

16th-century English politician (1529–1611)

James Marvyn (1529–1611), of Fonthill Gifford, Wiltshire, was an English politician.

== Family ==
He was the eldest son of Sir John Marvyn (1503–1566) of Compton Bassett and Sherborne, Dorset and his first wife Jane, daughter of Phillip Baskerville, and widow of William Peverell of Bradford Peverell.

He married firstly (by 1566) Amy Clarke, daughter of Valentine Clarke and Elizabeth Bridges, by whom he had one daughter, Lucy. He married secondly (by 1601) Deborah Pilkington, widow of Walter Dunch MP (died 1594) and daughter of James Pilkington, Bishop of Durham and Alice Kingsmill. Through Deborah he gained a life interest in Avebury manor in Wiltshire, and in 1601 he built or rebuilt the south range of the manor house there.

Lucy married George Tuchet, 1st Earl of Castlehaven and had seven children, including Mervyn Tuchet, 2nd Earl of Castlehaven and Christian, her grandfather's principal heiress, who married her distant cousin Sir Henry Mervyn and was the mother of the prominent Irish politician and barrister Sir Audley Mervyn.

Amy also had a daughter Elizabeth by her first husband, a Mr Horne of Sarsden, Oxfordshire. Elizabeth's marriage to Anthony Bourne was a cause of much worry to her stepfather.

== Career ==
Early in the reign of Elizabeth I he was appointed an Esquire of the body, and received other Court offices which assured him of a comfortable income. Since James insisted that he and his father were on the best of terms, his assured income may explain his father's decision to disinherit him in favour of his widow and younger children and a grandson John, who received Compton Bassett. James always maintained that the will had been forged by his stepmother, Elizabeth Mompesson, who received a life estate.

He was a Member (MP) of the Parliament of England for Wiltshire in 1572 and for Hindon in 1597. Given his prominence in county affairs, it is perhaps surprising that he did not seek election more often. He did not make much mark as a Parliamentarian, never speaking in debate and sitting on very few committees.

== Character ==
Like many landowners of the time, Marvyn could be quarrelsome, and was prepared to take the quarrel to extreme lengths. A feud with Sir John Thynne lasted 15 years, and ended in an armed affray and a Star Chamber hearing. Yet he has been described by a biographer as a man who had "the virtues of his type". His will certainly gives evidence of a kindly enough nature, making provision for several nephews and nieces, his impoverished brother Ambrose, his tenants and family servants. He settled the principal family estate on his granddaughter Christian and her husband Sir Henry Mervyn, who promptly sold them to her brother Lord Castlehaven.

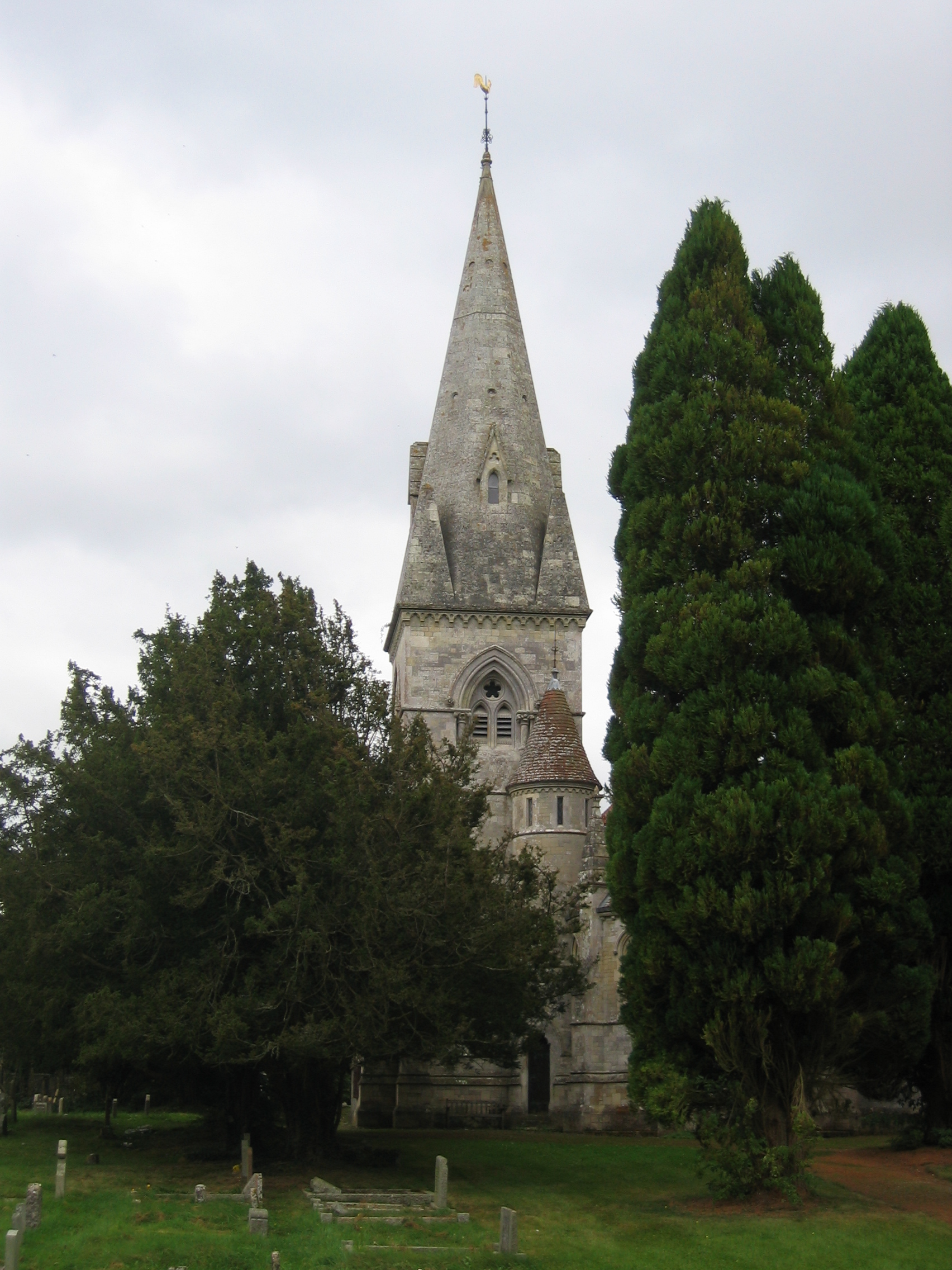
Fonthill Gifford, the Marvyn family residence for generations
