= All Saints Church, Alton Priors =

All Saints Church
- Church of All Saints
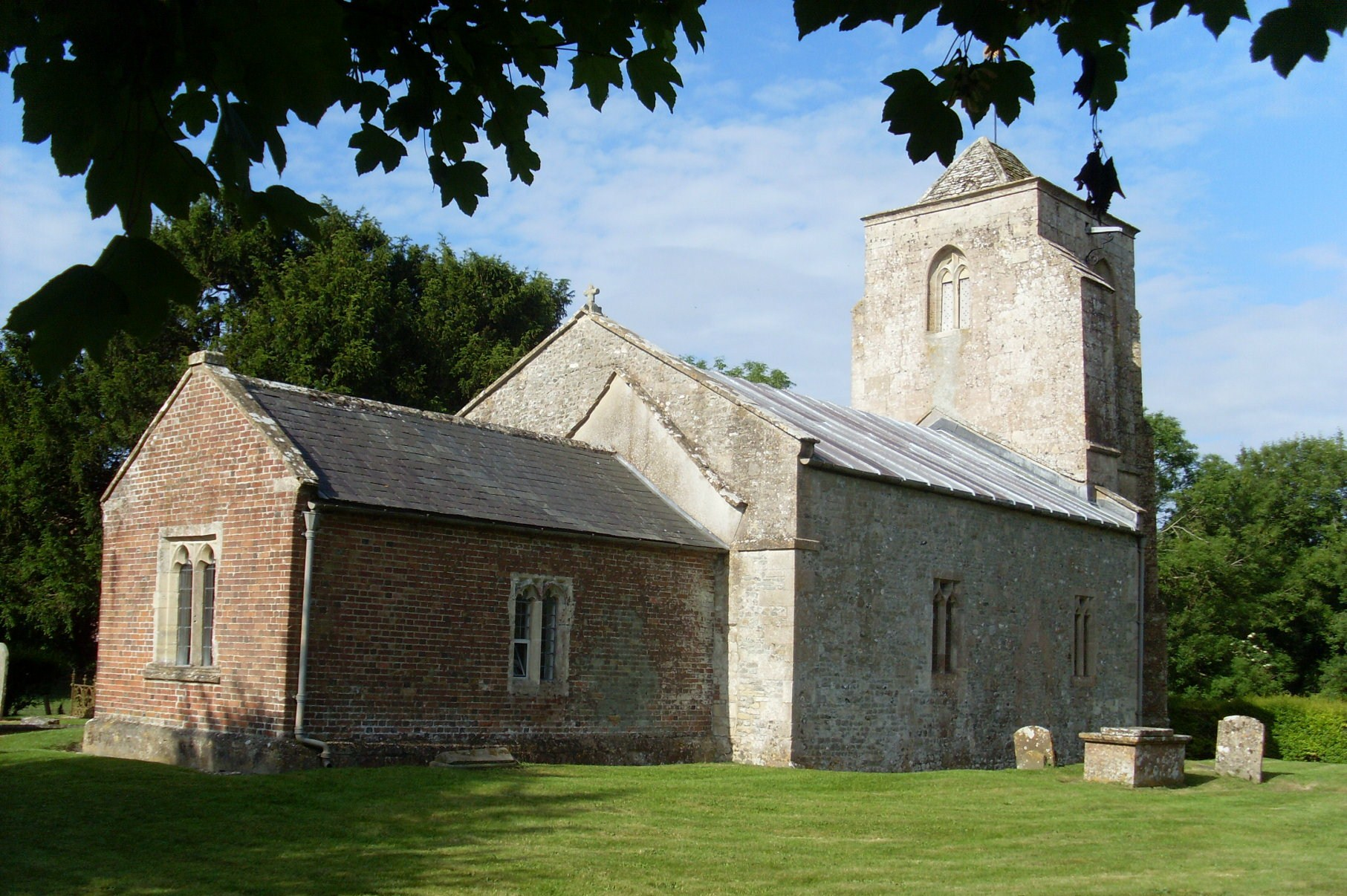

- Location within Wiltshire
- 51°21′29″N 1°50′40″W
- Location: Alton Priors, Wiltshire, England

History
- Built: 12th century

Site notes
- Website: Churches Conservation Trust

Listed Building – Grade II*
- Designated: 27 May 1964
- Reference no.: 1364710

All Saints Church in Alton Priors, Wiltshire, England, dates from the 12th century. It is recorded in the National Heritage List for England as a Grade II* listed building, and is now in the care of The Churches Conservation Trust. It was declared redundant on 28 July 1972, and was vested in the Trust on 12 December 1973.

== History and description ==
The church was built of limestone and malmstone rubble in the 12th century, but has undergone several major refurbishments since. The only parts of the 12th-century building that remain in place are the imposts of the chancel arch, with simple ornamentation. Fragments from another 12th-century arch are on display in the church.

The presence in the floor of the church of trapdoors giving access to Sarsen stones, and the presence of the 1,700-year-old yew tree in the churchyard, suggest it was a sacred site long before the church was built.

In 1491, landowner John Button bequeathed lead to roof part of the church. In the 18th century the nave, two-stage west tower and chancel were all replaced. The church contains Jacobean stall fronts, and The three bells are from the 18th century and are said to be unringable.

Lead was stolen from the south side of the nave roof in 2016, but funds were quickly raised by the community to provide a temporary replacement.

The church has no permanent electricity supply. The churchyard is not owned by the Churches Conservation Trust and is maintained by the parochial council and volunteers.

== Monuments ==
On the north side of the chancel, a 16th-century tomb-chest surmounted by a monumental brass commemorates landowner William Button (died 1591), great-grandson of John. Pevsner calls the monument "conceitism at its best ... the deceased rises from his tomb, his naked body turned to the background where the gates of heaven have opened and the angel with the last trump appears ... plenty of inscriptions".

== Services and events ==
The church was used for three services a year as of 2011, but by 2020 there were no regular services. Local volunteers raise funds by holding a music festival in June each year, featuring the "Music for Awhile" ensemble.

== Parish ==
Alton Priors was anciently a chapelry of Overton (now West Overton), its church being some five miles south of Overton church by road. In 1913, Alton Priors was detached from Overton vicarage and attached to the adjacent rectory of Alton Barnes to form the parish of Alton Barnes with Alton Priors. St Mary at Alton Barnes is now the parish church, and is one of sixteen in the Vale of Pewsey group.

== See also ==
- List of churches preserved by the Churches Conservation Trust in Southwest England
