= John Robson (priest) =

English Anglican priest

John Robson (1581–1645) was an English Anglican priest who was elected to the House of Commons in 1621 although, as a cleric, he was ineligible.

Robson was born at Kirby Thore, Westmorland, the son of the Revd Robert Robson, clerk of Warcop, Westmorland. He was educated at Appleby and matriculated at Queen's College, Oxford, on 13 October 1598, aged 17. He was awarded a BA at St Edmund Hall, Oxford, in 1602 and an MA in 1605. He was ordained deacon and priest at Norwich on 21 September 1606. In 1607 he was incorporated at Cambridge University from Oxford and awarded a MA. He became Rector of Morpeth, Northumberland in 160(?) and remained until 1643. He became rector of Whalton, Northumberland in 1615 and a canon of Durham in 1620, holding both positions until 1645.

In 1621, Robson was elected Member of Parliament for Morpeth but he was declared ineligible due to being a cleric who had a voice in the convocation. He became chaplain in ordinary to King Charles I.

Robson died at the age of about 64 and was buried in Durham Cathedral on 12 April 1645.

Robson married Margaret Cradock, daughter of Archdeacon John Cradock.

Parliament of England
Preceded by Sir Christopher Perkins; William Button	Member of Parliament for Morpeth; 1621; With: Robert Brandling	Succeeded by Robert Brandling; Ralph Fetherstonhaugh
