= John Stourton, 1st Baron Stourton =

Member of the Parliament of England

Arms of Stourton: Sable, a bend or between six fountains

John Stourton, 1st Baron Stourton (19 May 1400 – 25 November 1462) of Stourton, Wiltshire, was an English soldier and politician, elevated to the peerage in 1448.

== Origins ==
He was born on 19 May 1400 at Witham Friary, Somerset, the son of Sir William de Stourton (abt. 1373 – 18 September 1413), Speaker of the House of Commons, by his wife Elizabeth Moigne, daughter and co-heiress of Sir John Moigne of Ower Moigne, Dorset.

== Career ==
Stourton served as High Sheriff of Wiltshire in 1426, 1433 and 1437, Somerset and Dorset in 1428 and of Gloucestershire in 1439. He was returned to Parliament as knight of the shire for Wiltshire in December 1421, 1425 and 1432 and for Dorset in 1423. He was knighted c. 1430.

He was also Treasurer of the Household from 1445 to 1453 and fought for five years in the wars in France and Normandy, acting as Lieutenant of Calais from 1450 to 1451. He was custodian of the French Royal hostage Charles, Duke of Orléans at Stourton in 1438–9, towards the end of the Duke's long imprisonment in England. In 1448 he was raised to the peerage as Baron Stourton, of Stourton in the County of Wiltshire.

Stourton also had commercial interests, being a shipowner and a backer of Robert Sturmy's 1458/8 attempt to break the Italian monopoly over trade to the eastern Mediterranean.

== Marriage and children ==
Stourton married Margery Wadham, a daughter of Sir John Wadham (c. 1344 – 1412) of Edge, Branscombe, Devon, of Merryfield, Ilton, Somerset, and of Wadham, Knowstone near South Molton, Devon by his second wife Joan Wrottesley.

Sir John Wadham was MP for Exeter in 1399 and for Devon, as a knight of the shire with Sir Philip Courtenay, in 1401. He was a Justice of the Common Pleas from 1389 to 1398, and ancestor to Nicholas Wadham, co-founder of Wadham College, Oxford. Sir John and Margery Stourton had children as follows:

- William Stourton, 2nd Baron Stourton (1432 – c. 1477), married Margaret Chidiock (bef. 1428 – 12 March 1502/03), daughter of Sir John (V) Chidiock and Catherine Lumley.
- Margaret Stourton (b. 1433), married Sir George Darell of Littlecote, Wiltshire. Their daughter, Elizabeth, would marry Sir John Seymour, Warden of Savernake Forest. Elizabeth and John were the grandparents of Edward Seymour, 1st Duke of Somerset; Thomas Seymour, 1st Baron Seymour of Sudeley; Elizabeth Seymour, Marchioness of Winchester; and Jane Seymour, third wife of Henry VIII and mother of Edward VI.
- Sir Reginald Stourton of Stourton (b. 1434), High Sheriff of Wiltshire in 1455–1456 and 1462–1463
- Nicholas Stourton
- John Stourton
- Joan Stourton (b. 1446), married Richard De La Warr

== Death and succession ==
He died in November 1462 and was succeeded in the barony by his son William. He was outlived by his wife.

Peerage of England
New creation	Baron Stourton; 1448–1462	Succeeded by William Stourton
