= Ashley Truluck =

British Army general

Major General Ashley Truluck CB CBE
- Born: 7 December 1947 (age 78); Pembrokeshire, England
- Military career
- Allegiance: United Kingdom
- Branch: British Army
- Service years: 1968–2001
- Rank: Major General
- Commands: Royal School of Signals; 3rd Armoured Divisional Signal Regiment
- Awards: Companion of the Order of the Bath; Commander of the Order of the British Empire
- Other work: High Sheriff of Wiltshire (2020–21)

Major General Ashley Ernest George Truluck, CB, CBE (born 7 December 1947) is a retired British Army officer and administrator who served as High Sheriff of Wiltshire from 2020 to 2021.

== Career ==
Truluck was born in Pembrokeshire on 7 December 1947, the son of Major George William Truluck of the Royal Artillery, and his wife Elizabeth Kitchener. After graduating from the Royal Military Academy Sandhurst in December 1968, Truluck was commissioned into the Royal Corps of Signals. In 1970, he transferred to the Brigade of Gurkhas and, in 1975, was posted back to the Royal Corps of Signals. By 1988, he was commanding officer of the 3rd Armoured Divisional Signal Regiment, having served around the world in communications and intelligence, and with army aviation. He was commander of the Royal School of Signals from 1990 to 1993, and was later on the General Staff. In his final years in the army, Truluck's main role was in programme management, implementing the restructuring of the British Army and NATO. He was Director of Staff Operations, UK Land Forces from 1994 to 1996; Director of the Attack Helicopter Programme at the Ministry of Defence from 1997 to 1998; and Director General, Command Structure (ACOS) at NATO from 1998 to 2000. He was promoted to the substantive rank of major-general on 28 April 1998.

Truluck retired from the army in 2001 as a major general, and was appointed a Companion of the Order of the Bath in the 2001 Birthday Honours.

== Later career ==
After the army, Truluck worked in both the public and private sectors. He was Chief Executive of the London Courts Authority from 2001 to 2003, at the same time chairing the London Criminal Justice Board; Strategic Consultant with Bell Labs (USA) and IBM (UK) from 2003 to 2005; Chairman of the Defence Information Management Study at the Ministry of Defence from 2005 to 2006; National Programme Director, Fire & Rescue Communications, at the Department of Communities and Local Government from 2007 to 2010; Strategic Adviser, Defence & National Security, at IBM, from 2010 to 2013.

Truluck is now a consultant, with Kerykeion Management Services, formerly ATA (Ashley Truluck Associates), providing advice to commercial, charitable, and public service organizations. He has also been head of an offshore sailing association, Chairman of the Wiltshire Community Foundation, and is chairman of the Society for Army Historical Research.

In November 2017, the Privy Council nominated Truluck as a potential High Sheriff of Wiltshire and, on 25 March 2020, he was sworn into office as High Sheriff. In March 2021 he was succeeded by Sir Charles Hobhouse.

== Private life ==
Truluck married Jennifer J. Bell in Wensleydale in 1976. They have one son and one daughter, and live in the Chalke Valley, having previously lived near Amesbury, Swindon, and Salisbury, all in Wiltshire.
