= John Bonham (MP) =

16th-century English politician

Sir John Bonham (c. 1524–1555) was an English politician.

He was the eldest son of John Bonham of Hazelbury. He succeeded his father in 1544 and was knighted by 1553.

He was a member (MP) of the parliament of England for Chippenham in 1545. He was on the Wiltshire bench as a Justice of the Peace from 1547 and appointed High Sheriff of Wiltshire for 1549–50.

He married Anne, the daughter and coheir of Robert Willoughby, 2nd Baron Willoughby de Broke, and widow of Charles Blount, 5th Baron Mountjoy and Richard Broke of Westbury, with whom he had at least one son and one daughter.
