= John Marvyn =

16th-century English politician

Sir John Marvyn (by 1503 – 18 June 1566), of Fonthill Gifford, Wiltshire, was an English politician.

He was the son of John Marvyn, head of a family which had been settled at Fonthill Gifford for generations, and Elizabeth Green. By his first wife Jane, daughter of Phillip Baskerville of Sherborne, and widow of William Peverell of Bradford Peverell, he had thirteen children, including Sir James Marvyn and Elizabeth, who married John Ryves of Damory Court, Dorset and had several distinguished sons. He married secondly Elizabeth Mompessson, daughter of John Mompessson of Bathampton, and widow of Richard Perkins.

He was a Member (MP) of the Parliament of England for Wiltshire in April 1554 and for Calne in November 1554. He served three times as High Sheriff of Wiltshire. He received a knighthood, possibly an indication that he was unsympathetic to the Protestant Reformation, and thus likely to be favoured by Queen Mary I.

From 1547 on he engaged in a bitter feud with Sir Thomas Arundell, a Cornishman who became a rising power in Wiltshire, Marvyn's home county, through his purchase of Wardour Castle. Arundell, unlike Marvyn, was a considerable figure at Court, but his intrigues led to his execution for conspiracy to overthrow the Government in 1552. Marvyn played no part in Arundell's downfall, but turned it to good advantage by purchasing from the Crown the forfeited manor of Compton Bassett, adjoining Fonthill.

His last will and testament, which was signed a few days before his death, is a rather curious document, as it effectively disinherited his eldest son, Sir James, although James, so far from being a source of disappointment, was already a coming man in the county, and held two positions at Court. Marvyn's widow received a life estate in much of his property, and there was provision for younger sons and daughters, while the manor of Compton Bassett passed to the eldest grandson. Sir John's motives are obscure, since there is no evidence of a quarrel between himself and James. James himself always maintained that his stepmother had forged the will to gain a life estate for herself.

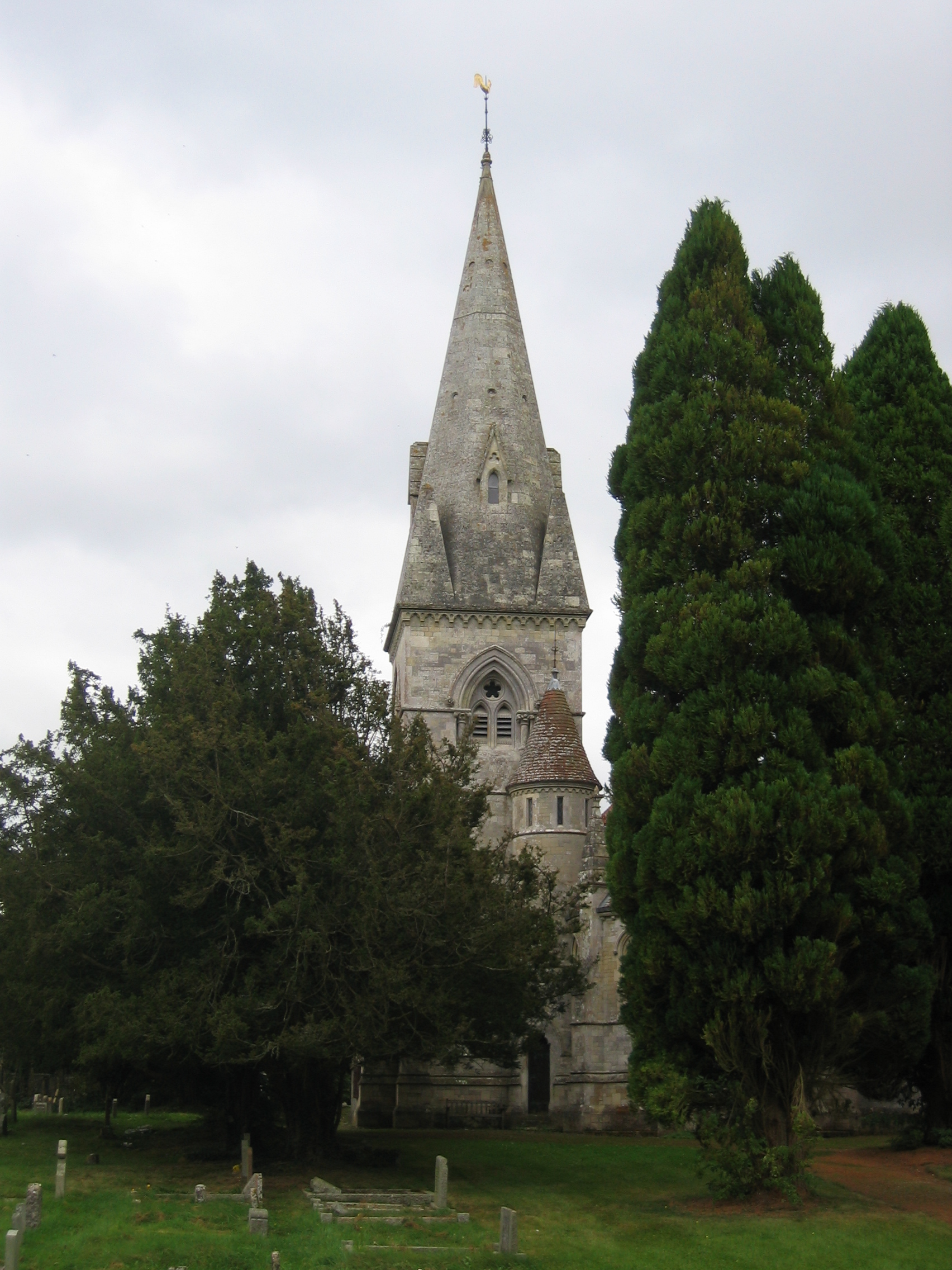
Fonthill Gifford, home of the Marvyn family for generations
