= Button, Button =

Button, Button may refer to:

- Button, button, who's got the button?, a traditional children's game
- "Button, Button" (Asimov short story), a 1953 short story by Isaac Asimov
- "Button, Button" (Matheson short story), a short story by Richard Matheson
- "Button, Button", a 1961 episode of 'Way Out
- "Button, Button" (The Twilight Zone), a 1986 episode of The Twilight Zone, based on the Matheson story
