= RAF Compton Bassett =

Former RAF station in Wiltshire, England

Coordinates: 51.438°N 1.978°W

RAF Compton Bassett
- Calne, Wiltshire in England
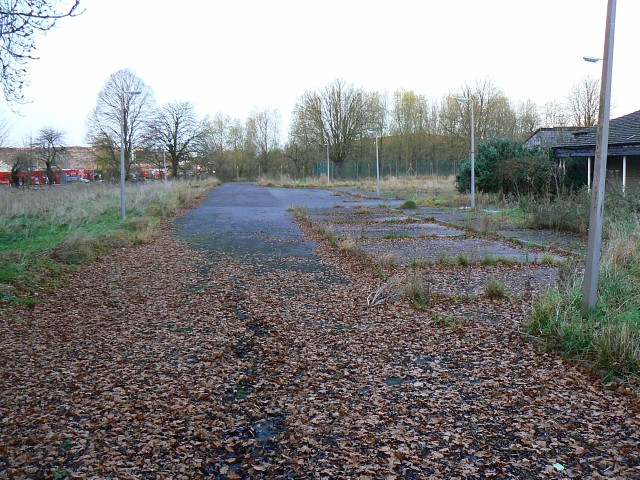
- Entrance to RAF Compton Bassett, 2008

Site information
- Type: Radar Training Site
- Owner: Ministry of Defence
- Operator: Royal Air Force
- Controlled by: RAF Technical Training Command

Site history
- Built: 1940
- In use: 1940 - 1960
- Battles/wars: European theatre of World War II; Cold War

RAF Compton Basset was a Royal Air Force station Wiltshire, England, about 1 mile (1.6 km) east of the town of Calne.

First opened as an RAF station in 1940 and used for radar training, it had no airfield. The site is often confused with RAF Yatesbury that was constructed partly within the parish of Compton Bassett in 1916. During the Second World War, RAF Yatesbury and RAF Compton Bassett were major Radio and Radar Training Schools, RAF Townsend a satellite landing ground and RAF Cherhill was No. 27 Group Headquarters Technical Training Command.

After the war it became a trade training camp for certain ground Signals trades. Many thousands of newly recruited RAF personnel, most having just completed their 8 weeks basic training, were taught their RAF trade skills at RAF Compton Bassett, so as to become competent Radar Operators PPI, Wireless Operators, Teleprinter Operators, Telegraphists or Telephonists before being posted to work at RAF operational stations and airfields elsewhere in the United Kingdom or abroad. As well as their trade training, personnel experienced tougher service discipline at Compton Bassett than on operational stations. There were frequent parades involving military drill, regular "stand by your beds" inspections of personal appearance, kit inspections and inspections of barrack hut accommodation. Being put on a charge for not being up to required standard, resulting in Jankers, was very commonly experienced by personnel while being trade trained there.

It also became home of the No. 3 Radio School RAF, which in the 1950s trained later washing machine entrepreneur John Bloom, The local coach company Cards of Devizes provided contracted coaches to the RAF, which on a Saturday afternoon would take the airmen to London on their 36-hour passes. Bloom decided with a friend who ran a coach company in Stoke Newington that they could underprice the Card/RAF's coaches. When Cards took Bloom to court, the judge upheld Bloom with a declaration that became Bloom's motto: "It's no sin to make a profit."

== USAF housing ==
After the station closed in the 1960s, the housing around the camp continued to be used after the main station had shut by RAF staff working at RAF Lyneham and other nearby RAF stations. In the 1980s the housing was used for United States Air Force personnel stationed at airfields such as RAF Fairford and RAF Greenham Common. The housing was later sold to private buyers.

== Present ==
The site of RAF Compton Bassett is now known as Lower Compton, after petitioning by residents for a separate name, since it lies two miles from the village of Compton Bassett.
