= Geoffrey Chance =

English cricketer (1893–1987)

Personal information
- Full name: Geoffrey Henry Barrington Chance
- Born: 16 December 1893; Burghfield, Berkshire, England
- Died: 11 July 1987 (aged 93); Minety, Wiltshire, England
- Batting: Left-handed
- Bowling: Right-arm medium

Domestic team information
- Years: Team
- 1912–1913: Berkshire
- 1913: Hampshire
- 1922: Marylebone Cricket Club

Career statistics
Competition	First-class
Matches	2
Runs scored	0
Batting average	0.00
100s/50s	–/–
Top score	0*
Balls bowled	72
Wickets	–
Bowling average	–
5 wickets in innings	–
10 wickets in match	–
Best bowling	–
Catches/stumpings	–/–
- Source: Cricinfo, 30 December 2009

Geoffrey Henry Barrington Chance CBE (16 December 1893 – 11 July 1987) was an English army officer and first-class cricketer.

== Early life ==
The son of Ernest Chance and his wife Lucy Isabella Barrington, he was born in December 1893 at Burghfield, Berkshire. He was educated at Eton College, where he played for the college cricket team in his final year.

== Cricket ==
In his first match for Eton, against the Marylebone Cricket Club, Chance took figures of 10 for 36. His wickets included experienced first-class batsman Edward Dowson, William Findlay, Frank Phillips and Peter Randall Johnson. The Times described his bowling for Eton in their match against Winchester College as "Chance made good use of his wicket; he bowls fast to medium in pace over the wicket; he kept a length and made the ball get up quickly and go away just a little." His skills as a cricketer were noted by Berkshire, with him playing minor counties cricket for the county in 1912 and 1913, making three appearances in the Minor Counties Championship. He played for Hampshire in 1913, making a single appearance against the Marylebone Cricket Club (MCC) at Lord's. His only appearance for Hampshire was to be an unsuccessful one, with Chance being dismissed in Hampshire's first-innings without scoring by Frank Tarrant, while across the match he bowled nine wicketless overs.

Chance made one appearance for the MCC against Scotland, at Lord's in 1923.

== Career ==
Chance served in the British Army during the First World War, being commissioned as a second lieutenant into the Hampshire Regiment (later the Royal Hampshire Regiment) in October 1914. He was promoted to lieutenant in June 1915, and by May 1916 he was serving with the Machine Gun Corps. He was made a temporary captain in April 1917, before being made a temporary major in February 1918. In September 1918 he was seconded to become an instructor at the Small Arms School Corps at Hythe, Kent. Two months later he ceased to hold this position.

Qualifying as Chartered Accountant in 1928, Chance practised the profession from 1930. From 1941 to 1945 he worked in the Treasury. Subsequently he was a company director.

== Later life ==
Chance was later made a Commander of the Order of the British Empire in the 1962 Birthday Honours for political and public service in Wiltshire. He served as High Sheriff of Wiltshire in 1965. In 1984, at the age of 90, he became the oldest person to pass their driving test in the United Kingdom. He died in July 1987 at Minety, Wiltshire; at the time of his death he was one of the few surviving cricketers to have played first-class cricket before the First World War.
