= Robert Brandling =

Robert Brandling (1575–1636) was an English landowner and politician who sat in the House of Commons from 1621 to 1622.

Brandling was the son of William Brandling of Felling and Anne Helye, daughter of George Heyle; he was a member of the Brandling family of Newcastle. He was baptised on 23 January 1575; his father died in the same year. In 1605, when he came of age, he did homage to the Dean and Chapter of Durham for the manor of Felling, declaring "I do become yours and the Chapter's man from this day forward for life, and member, and earthly honour, and to you shall be faithful and loyal, and shall be in faith to you for the lands which I do clayme to hold of you, saveing the faith I owe to our Sovereign Lord the king, and to such other Lords as I hold of." In 1610, King James I granted him Newminster Abbey. He was High Sheriff of Northumberland in 1617. In 1621, he was elected Member of Parliament for Morpeth.

He married firstly Jane Wortley, daughter of Francis Wortley of Wortley, and had six sons, including Francis who succeeded to the estates, and two daughters. He married secondly Mary Hilton, daughter of Thomas Hilton, and had two more sons.

He died in 1636 at the age of 61.

Parliament of England
Preceded by Sir Christopher Perkins; William Button	Member of Parliament for Morpeth; 1621–1622; With: John Robson 1621; Ralph Fetherstonhaugh 1621–1622	Succeeded by Sir Thomas Reynell; Sir William Carnaby
