= Ambrose Button =

16th-century English politician

Sir Ambrose Button (c. 1549 – after 1608) was the member of the Parliament of England for Malmesbury for the Parliament of 1571.

Button was the first son of William Button (1526–1591) of Alton Priors, Wiltshire, who had also been an MP. Ambrose was disinherited by his father in favour of his brother, also William (died 1599), causing the Privy Council to summon William senior to London to explain matters. They informed him that Queen Elizabeth "much disliked" the action, and that Ambrose was "known to some at court to be of very good behaviour and well affected in religion, perhaps better given" than William junior. The disinheritance was not reversed, however.

Button was knighted at Greenwich in 1605.
