= Sir William Button, 1st Baronet =

English politician

Sir William Button, 1st Baronet (1584 – 16 January 1655) was an English landowner who sat in the House of Commons at various times between 1614 and 1629. He supported the Royalist cause in the English Civil War.

Button was the son of William Button, of Alton and of Tockenham Court, Wiltshire, and his wife Jane Lambe, daughter of John Lambe, of East Coulston, Wiltshire. He matriculated at Queen's College, Oxford, on 13 February 1601, aged 16. He was knighted at Whitehall on 15 July 1605. From 1611 to 1612 he was High Sheriff of Wiltshire. In 1614, he was elected Member of Parliament for Morpeth. He was possibly admitted to Gray's Inn on 2 February 1618. He was created a baronet on 18 March 1622. In 1628 he was elected MP for Wiltshire. He supported the king in the Civil War and was fined £2,880 on 2 January 1647.

The family owned properties in Wiltshire at Alton Priors, Lyneham, Tockenham and North Wraxall. Among his properties was Tockenham Court manor (then in Lyneham, now in Tockenham parish); his residence there was looted by Parliamentary troops in 1643 and 1644.

Button died in 1655 and was buried at North Wraxall where there is a monumental inscription to his memory.

Button married in 1611 or earlier Ruth Dunch, daughter of Walter Dunch of Avebury, Wiltshire. He was succeeded in the baronetcy by his son William.

Parliament of England
Preceded by Sir Christopher Perkins; John Hare	Member of Parliament for Morpeth; 1614; With: Arnold Herbert	Succeeded by Robert Brandling; John Robson
Preceded by Sir Henry Poole; Walter Long	Member of Parliament for Wiltshire; 1628–1629; With: Sir Francis Seymour	Parliament suspended until 1640
Baronetage of England
New creation	Baronet (of Alton); 1622–1655	Succeeded by William Button
