= Farley Castle =

Building in Swallowfield, Berkshire, England

Coordinates: 51.3805°N 0.9225°W

Farley Castle is an early 19th-century modern house situated at Farley Hill, Swallowfield, Berkshire.

The Gothic-styled, two-storey house in red brick with battlements and round turrets, was built for Edward Stephenson Esq in c. 1810 for his youngest son Henry Stephenson who farmed the estate. For the first 30 years the Castle was known as Ragg Castle. Edward Stephenson's eldest son Rowland Stephenson inherited Farley Castle in 1833 - Rowland changed his name to Rowland Standish in 1834 to inherit estates on his mother's side of the family. In 1843 Rowland died and his eldest son Edward Ferris Standish inherited Farley Castle. Edward died in 1845 and his younger brother Rowland Edmund Walter Pery Standish inherited Farley Castle.

Farley Castle was rented out to the Martin-Atkins family from 1854 but in 1867 it was bought by William Hastings Martin-Atkins. On his death in 1902 it passed to his step-son Captain Henry Meredith Richards OBE, who didn't live there, but rented it out to a rich brewing family, Walter Mortimer & Louise Allfrey. I 1922 Louise Allfrey bought Farley Castle.

On Louise's death in 1944, Farley Castle was bought by Owen Wilfred Beardmore who converted the Castle into a Hotel & Country Club.

In 1952, it was the residence of adventurer, author & amateur archaeologist, Frederick Mitchell-Hedges, discoverer of the controversial rock crystal "Skull of Doom", who wrote his autobiographical "Danger My Ally" there in 1953/54.

In 1958, Farley Castle was purchased by Dorothy Woolley who founded Hephaistos School for very bright but disabled boys. Initially a day school based in the castle, Hephaistos became a Special School with the addition of amenities including a teaching block, dormitories, dining hall, and a swimming pool. Berkshire County Council purchased the school and ran it from 1966 to 1988 when it closed.

Despite being a Grade II listed building, between 1988 and 1992 Farley Castle was totally neglected and abandoned. It was purchased by developers but was allowed to be occupied and stripped by a Peace Convoy from Greenham Common and the Castle lay roofless and neglected for a couple of years.

Eventually, in 1992, it was purchased by new developers and the Castle was renovated and converted to three houses. Other house was built in the grounds.
