= Robert Sturmy =

Bristol merchant (died 1458)

- Born: c.1410 probably Bristol
- Died: 11 June 1458; Aboard ship, near Malta
- Cause of death: Attack by pirates
- Citizenship: England
- Occupation: Merchant
- Years active: 1433-1458
- Known for: Attempts to expand England's commercial horizons in the 15th century
- Spouse: Ellen
- Children: none

Robert Sturmy (died 1458) was a 15th-century Bristol merchant best known for his unsuccessful attempt to break the Italian monopoly over commerce to the eastern Mediterranean by trading there directly from England.

== Family ==
Sturmy was most likely born in Bristol in the early 15th century. Given that he was actively engaged in international commerce by 1433, he was probably born c.1410. Nothing is known of Sturmy's birth, upbringing or parents, but his brother, John Sturmy, is recorded in the town. Robert married his wife, Ellen, before 1438. She survived him and continued trading as an independent businesswoman until at least 1466. They had no children.

== Career ==
Like many of Bristol's wealthier merchants, Sturmy was a member of the town council. He was appointed bailiff of the town in 1442–3, served as one of the sheriff's of Bristol in 1451–2, and was mayor of Bristol in 1453–4.

The earliest known reference to Sturmy is from 1433, when he acted as factor (agent) for two London merchants, importing olive oil and dyestuffs into the capital. Like many Bristol merchants, much of his early business involved trade to Ireland and Gascony. However, during the 1440s and 1450s he expanded his commercial horizons, trading to Spain, southern Iberia and Italy. He imported goods via London and Southampton, as well as Bristol, sometimes in partnership with prominent London merchants.

In 1445, Sturmy sponsored a voyage conveying 200 pilgrims to Santiago de Compostela in Galicia and in 1447 his ship the Cog Anne took pilgrims to Jaffa in Palestine but was wrecked off Greece on the return voyage, with the loss of 37 lives.

Sturmy led a commercial expedition from Bristol in 1457–58 to break the Italian monopoly on trade to the Eastern Mediterranean. If he had been successful, it would have allowed England to gain direct access to both the oriental spices that entered Europe via the Ottoman Empire and to alum from Chios. Sturmy's three-ship voyage was backed by powerful interests in England, including Sir John Stourton, who owned one of the ships. However, the venture was opposed by the Italian merchants who controlled most of Europe's long-distance trade and banking at this time. In the event, the ships succeeded in conducting their trade but were then set upon by Genoese-backed pirates on their return voyage. Genoa controlled much of the alum trade with the eastern Mediterranean, which they transported directly to England and other parts of northern Europe, where it was used to dye woollen cloth. Since alum made up the greater part of the fleet's cargo, the Genoese feared the loss of this lucrative branch of their commerce.

On 10 June 1458, Sturmy's fleet was attacked off Malta by the Genoese pirate, Giuliano Gatilusio. In a later court deposition, one of the survivors reported that the pirates:

assaulted your said beseechers in the most horrible and cruel ways of war, that is to say with wildfire, burning oil, unslaked lime, caltrops and gunshot a 1000 of a day and slew of their folks your true subjects and liegemen to the number of 128 (and the remnant sore hurt and wounded) and took and destroyed all their said ships, merchandise and goods. (spelling modernised)

The running battle was said to have lasted three days, with Robert Sturmy among the dead.

== Aftermath ==
The financial losses from the 1457/8 expedition were claimed to amount to £6,000. It led to the arrest of the entire Genoese community in England and the seizure of their assets. Such an extreme reaction is less surprising when it is considered that, relative to the size of the contemporary English economy, the losses would be equivalent to c. £750 million (at 2006 prices).

The loss of the expedition stymied English ambitions in the Mediterranean for at least half-a-century. Elenora Carus-Wilson, Stuart Jenks and others have argued that it helped to persuade Bristol merchants to turn their attention to Atlantic exploration. These westwards voyages included the expeditions to try to locate the island of Hy-Brazil in the 1480s, as well as John Cabot's expeditions of 1496–98, which resulted in the European discovery of North America in 1497.
