= Francis Brandling =

Sir Francis Brandling (1595 – 1641) was an English landowner and politician who sat in the House of Commons from 1624 to 1625.

He was the son of Robert Brandling of Felling and his wife Jane Wortley, daughter of Francis Wortley of Wortley, West Yorkshire. He inherited the Felling estate, but preferred to live at Alnwick Abbey.

Brandling welcomed King James at Alnwick Abbey on 7 May 1617 for two nights. The king had come from Bothal Castle and was on his way to Scotland. He was knighted at Brougham Castle, the seat of the Earl of Cumberland, on 8 August 1617.

In 1624, he was elected Member of Parliament for Northumberland. He was re-elected MP for Northumberland in 1625. In 1626, he was High Sheriff of Northumberland.

Brandling married, firstly, Elizabeth Grey, daughter of Sir Ralph Grey of Chillingham, Northumberland, and had five sons; and, secondly, Elizabeth Wheeler, widow of Richard Wheeler and daughter of Sir William Pitt of Stratfield Saye, Hampshire.

Brandling died at the age of 46.

Parliament of England
Preceded by Sir William Grey; Sir Henry Widdrington	Member of Parliament for Northumberland; 1624–1625; With: Sir John Fenwick	Succeeded by Sir John Fenwick; Sir John Delaval
