= Compton Bassett =

Village and civil parish in Wiltshire, England

Coordinates: 51.447°N 1.948°W

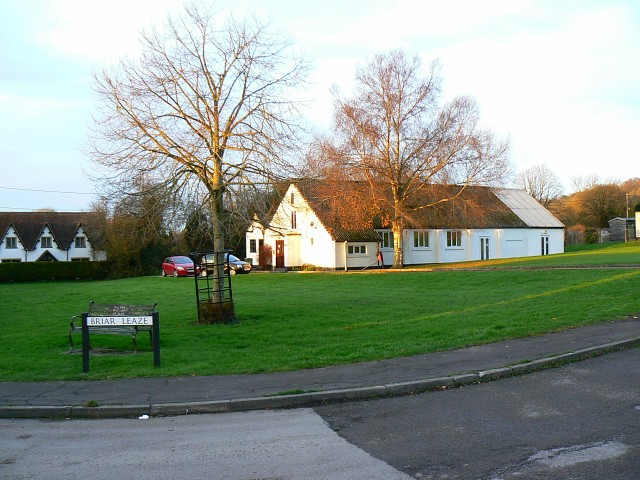
- Village Hall, Compton Bassett

- Location within Wiltshire
- Population: 227 (in 2011)
- OS grid reference: SU037720
- Civil parish: Compton Bassett
- Unitary authority: Wiltshire
- Ceremonial county: Wiltshire
- Region: South West
- Country: England
- Sovereign state: United Kingdom
- Post town: Calne
- Postcode district: SN11
- Dialling code: 01249
- Police: Wiltshire
- Fire: Dorset and Wiltshire
- Ambulance: South Western
- UK Parliament: Chippenham
- Website: Parish Council

Compton Bassett is a village and rural civil parish in Wiltshire, England, with a population of approximately 250. The village lies about 1 mile (1.6 km) north of Cherhill and 2 1/2 miles (4.0 km) east of the town of Calne.

== Parish church ==
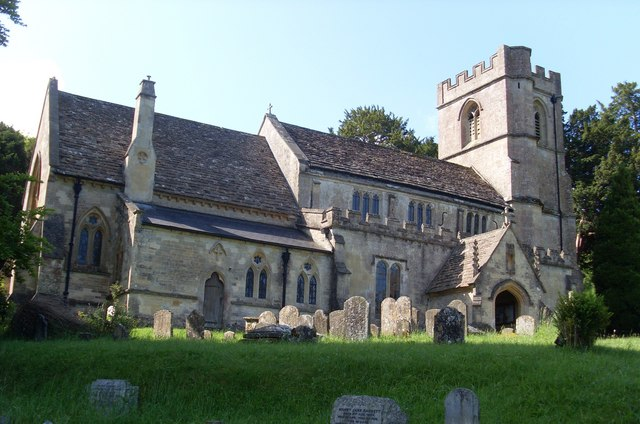
St Swithin's Church

The Church of England parish church of St Swithin, in the southwest of the village, is from the late 12th century, when it belonged to Bicester priory. Work from the 12th and 13th centuries survives in the nave while the tower and clerestory are from the 15th. The finely carved stone screen is also 15th-century and is described by Pevsner as "what remains in one's memory". In 1865 Henry Woodyer added the north porch and rebuilt the chancel with its side-chapels; the east window by Hardman is from the same time.

The church was designated as Grade I listed in 1960. Today it forms part of the Oldbury Benefice, a group of five rural parishes.

The rectory built c. 1840 was sold in 1968.

=== Midge Mather incident ===
In 1997, Compton Bassett church gained notoriety when a local resident, 65-year-old Midge Mather, broke into the church and cut through the bell ropes because she could not stand the noise of the bells. It took her upwards of two hours after breaking down the doors to cut the ropes and when she got home she rang the police and told them what she had done. She was given a Conditional Discharge for her actions.

== Compton Bassett House ==
A manor house stood at Compton Bassett in 1553, shortly after Sir John Marvyn purchased the manor from the Crown. A later house with a courtyard, standing in 1659, was later called Compton Bassett House. In 1672 the courtyard was built over to form a rectangular house with corner towers, having white stone walls. The house was encased in brick in the 19th century, probably by George Heneage Walker-Heneage, Member of Parliament for Devizes 1838–1857. Its parkland extended south and west into Cherhill parish, and in 1830 a half-timbered lodge was built at the western entrance.

The house was demolished in the early 1930s, and in 1935 its stable block was converted to a house, also called Compton Bassett House. In 2021 the house, with seven bedrooms, staff accommodation, helicopter hangar and 71 acres, was offered for sale at £6.75 million.

== Former RAF station ==
RAF Compton Bassett was opened as a communications training station in 1940, on farmland between Compton Bassett and Calne. Like nearby RAF Yatesbury, it continued in the post-war years before closing in 1964. The housing around the station continued to be used by RAF staff working at RAF Lyneham and other westcountry RAF bases, and in the 1980s by American service personnel stationed at US airbases such as Fairford and Greenham Common. The housing has now been sold to private buyers.

The former site of RAF Compton Bassett is now known as Lower Compton, after the petitioning by residents for a separate name, since it lies two miles from the village of Compton Bassett.

== Amenities ==
The village has a pub, the White Horse Inn. There is no school; the small school of 1854, later a National School, closed in 1964 owing to the low number of pupils.

== Notable residents ==
The travel writer Henry Maundrell was born in Compton Bassett in 1665. Major Clement Walker Heneage, awarded the Victoria Cross, was born here in 1831.

Architect Sir Norman Foster owned Compton Bassett House until 1992, and in 2008 it was bought by pop star Robbie Williams and his wife Ayda.

In May 2013, the comedian Michael McIntyre purchased a property in the village.
