= Richard Mawarden =

English politician

Richard Mawarden (died c. 1418), of Marden, Herefordshire, Sodbury, Gloucestershire and Stratford-sub-Castle, Wiltshire, was an English politician.

He was a Member (MP) of the Parliament of England for Herefordshire in April 1384, for Wiltshire in January 1404 and for Gloucestershire in October 1404.
