= Kenneth Button =

Kenneth Button may refer to:

- Kenneth Button (economist) (born 1948), British transport economist
- Kenneth Button (physicist) (1922–2010), American solid state physicist
