= RAF Yatesbury =

Former Royal Air Force station in Wiltshire, England

RAF Yatesbury

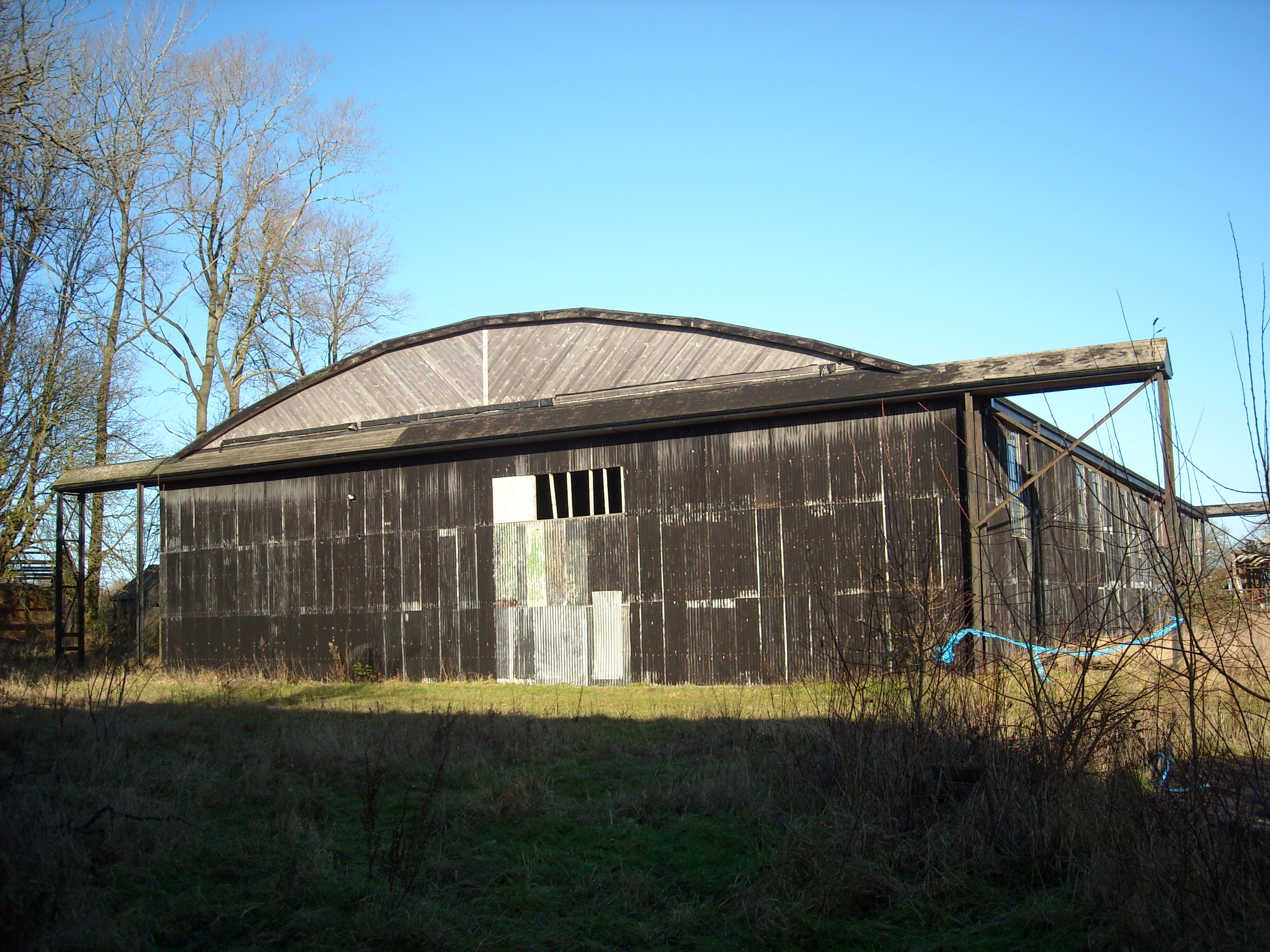
- Hangar at West Camp, 2014

Site information
- Owner: Air Ministry
- Operator: Royal Air Force
- Controlled by: RAF Technical Training Command

Location
- Shown within Wiltshire
- Coordinates: 51°26′13″N 1°55′26″W

Site history
- Built: 1916
- In use: 1916-1965
- Battles/wars: First World War; Second World War; Cold War

RAF Yatesbury is a former Royal Air Force station near the village of Yatesbury, Wiltshire, England, about 4 miles (6 km) east of the town of Calne. It was an important training establishment in the First and Second World Wars and until its closure in 1965. For a time in the 1950s, part of the site became RAF Cherhill.

== First World War ==
The Royal Flying Corps began pilot training at Yatesbury in 1916. Formations included No. 99 Squadron, and No. 7 and No. 8 squadrons of the Australian Flying Corps.

The aerodrome's site was farmland on the north side of the A4 road, south of Yatesbury village. There were two airfields, East Camp and West Camp, each with buildings and hangars. Two target areas were marked out. Training continued until 1919, then squadrons were sent to Yatesbury to be disbanded. The station closed in 1920 and returned to farmland.

The following units were here at some date before the inter-war years:

- No. 6 Air Stores Park RAF
- No. 13 Training Squadron became No. 36 Training Depot Station
- No. 16 Training Squadron became No. 37 Training Depot Station
- No. 17 Training Squadron became No. 37 Training Depot Station
- No. 28 Squadron RAF
- No. 32 Training Squadron AFC
- No. 36 Training Squadron
- No. 54 Squadron RAF
- No. 55 Reserve Squadron became No. 55 Training Squadron
- No. 59 Reserve Squadron became No. 59 Training Squadron
- No. 62 Reserve Squadron became No. 62 Training Squadron
- No. 65 Squadron RAF
- No. 66 Reserve Squadron became No. 66 Training Squadron
- No. 66 Squadron RAF
- No. 73 Squadron RAF
- 104th Aero Squadron

== Second World War ==
From 1936 the Bristol Aeroplane Company operated part of the west site as a civilian flying school (No. 10 Elementary and Reserve Flying Training School RAF) where trainees were prepared for service in the RAF or the Reserve, using de Havilland Tiger Moth aircraft.

Guy Gibson, leader of the famous "Dambusters" raid (Operation Chastise) of 1943, took his ab initio training here from November 1936 to January 1937.

In 1939 the Air Ministry took over the whole site and pilot training was transferred elsewhere so that the station could be used (together with nearby RAF Compton Bassett) to train many airborne wireless operators. In 1940 it was placed under No. 60 Group RAF. From 1942, radar operators were trained there.

East Camp housed the No. 2 Electrical and Wireless School RAF, later renamed No. 2 Radio School RAF, where among the instructors was Arthur C. Clarke, later a science fiction author and inventor. Radar training was at No. 9 Radio School RAF. An estimated 70 died flying from Yatesbury, including aircrew from Australia, Canada, Czechoslovakia, Poland, Russia, South Africa, and the United States. 21 are buried in the All Saints' parish churchyard in Yatesbury.

After the war, flying training resumed from 1945 to 1947.

== Cold War ==
During the Cold War in the 1950s, training of radar operators, mechanics and fitters continued at East Camp. From 1954 to 1958 the site became RAF Cherhill, 27 Group Headquarters, Technical Training Command.

Demand for training reduced after the winding-down of National Service from 1961. The site closed in 1965, with the Radar and Wireless training school transferring to RAF Locking. In 1969 the wooden huts were demolished and the land returned again to farming, leaving only a number of brick-built buildings, including the Officers' Mess, the gymnasium and three hangars.

== Present ==
Since 1987 the two groups of hangars built in 1916 have been Grade II* listed. In 1989 the former Officers' Mess and offices, built in 1936, were listed Grade II. In 1998 North Wiltshire District Council designated Yatesbury Aerodrome a Conservation Area.

The airfield is now farmland. Surviving hangars and other buildings can be seen from the A4. Proposals were made in 2004 and again in 2014 to develop the sites of the buildings for housing. By 2008 the three hangars were on the Heritage At Risk register. The condition of one deteriorated and permission to demolish it was given in 2012. The other two remained At Risk in 2015.

The Wiltshire Microlight Centre uses part of the site.

== In popular culture ==
The video to the 1988 No.1 hit song "Doctorin' the Tardis" by The Timelords, better known as The KLF, was partly filmed there.

== Units ==
The following units were here at some point from the inter-war years:

- No. 1 (Yatesbury) Wing RAF
- No. 2 Civil Air Navigation School RAF became No. 2 Air Observers Navigation School RAF
- No. 2 Elementary Flying Training School RAF
- No. 2 Electrical & Wireless School RAF became No. 2 Signals School RAF
- No. 2 Radio School RAF became No. 2 Radio Direction Finding School RAF
- No. 5 (Signals) Wing RAF
- No. 9 Radio School RAF
- No. 10 Elementary and Reserve Flying Training School RAF
- No. 10 Elementary Flying Training School RAF
- No. 10 Maintenance Unit RAF
- No. 27 (Signals Training) Group RAF
- No. 27 Squadron RAF Regiment
- 28th (Training) Wing RAF
- No. 50 Group Pool RAF
- No. 215 Wing RAF
- No. 2702 Squadron RAF Regiment
- No. 2807 Squadron RAF Regiment
- Bristol Wireless Flight RAF
- Casualty Evacuation Flight RAF
- Ground Controlled Approach (GCA) Wing RAF
- Special Signals School RAF
