= Button, button, who's got the button? =

Outdoor game

Button, button, who's got the button is a children's game of ingenuity where players form a circle with their hands out, palms together. One child, called the leader or 'it', takes an object such as a button and goes around the circle. In one person's hands they drop the button, though they continue to put their hands in the others' so that no one knows where the button is except for the giver and receiver. The button may not be shown throughout the passing, if it is then the game has to restart.

The leader, or all the children in the circle, says "Button, button, who's got the button?" and then each child in the circle guesses. The child guessing replies with their choice, e.g. "Billy has the button!"

Once the child with the button is finally guessed, that child is the one to distribute the button and start a new round.

== Alternate versions ==
=== Passing ===
A second similar version has the child who is "it" stand in the center of the circle. The button is then passed behind the backs of the children in the circle, stopping at random. "It" tries to guess where the button is and once the button is found takes his or her place in the circle. Whoever had the button then becomes the new "it" and play begins again.

=== Questions ===
A slight variation on the first two versions has "it" ask questions (like in the game Twenty Questions) to determine who has the button.

=== Staircase ===
Another version is usually played by several children with one adult. The game's origin is unknown, but it existed before 1900. The children start by sitting on the bottom stair of a staircase. The adult holds out both fists, one holding a button. The adult asks, "Button, button, who's got the button?" Whoever guesses correctly advances one step. The first one to reach the top step wins the game. If the staircase is not wide enough, the children can be divided up into teams.

== In popular culture ==
- In Little Men, by Louisa May Alcott, the children of Plumfield reference playing "Button, button, who's got the button?"
- In the Robert Frost poem "The Witch of Coos," the game is referenced in lines 7–8: "Summoning spirits isn't 'Button, button, who's got the button,' I would have them know."
- In Go Ask Alice, the kids at the party play button, button, who's got the button, where the "button" is an LSD-spiked can of soda. The diarist gets the spiked can of soda, which leads to her subsequent drug binge.
- In Willy Wonka & the Chocolate Factory, as Willy Wonka is presenting the machine that creates the three-course chewing gum he says, “button, button, who's got the button?” as he goes to turn on the machine.
- In the Donkey Kong Country Show, One of the episodes is called Barrel, Barrel, Who's Got The Barrel. It's a pun on the name Button, button who's got the button.
