= Alton, Wiltshire =

Civil parish in Wiltshire, England

Alton Barnes
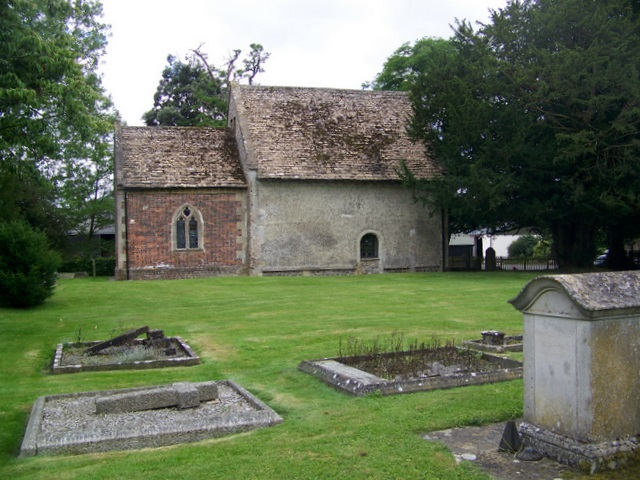
- The Church of St. Mary the Virgin

- Location within Wiltshire
- Population: 249 (in 2011)
- OS grid reference: SU1062
- Civil parish: Alton
- Unitary authority: Wiltshire
- Ceremonial county: Wiltshire
- Region: South West
- Country: England
- Sovereign state: United Kingdom
- Post town: Marlborough
- Postcode district: SN8
- Dialling code: 01672
- Police: Wiltshire
- Fire: Dorset and Wiltshire
- Ambulance: South Western
- UK Parliament: East Wiltshire
- Website: Parish Council

Alton is a civil parish in Wiltshire, England. The parish includes the adjacent villages of Alton Barnes and Alton Priors, and the nearby hamlet of Honeystreet on the Kennet and Avon Canal. It lies in the Vale of Pewsey about 6 miles (10 km) east of Devizes.

The north of the parish is on the Marlborough Downs and includes part of Milk Hill, which is the highest point in Wiltshire at 295 metres (968 ft). The Woodborough Stream, a tributary of the Hampshire Avon, rises at Alton Priors and separates the two villages as it flows south.

== History ==
The area has prehistoric sites including the Knap Hill earthwork and Adam's Grave, a Neolithic long barrow. A hoard of Roman coins was discovered at Alton Barnes.

The boundaries of Alton Barnes parish were established in the early 10th century, and the ancient parish became a civil parish in 1866. Alton Priors was a chapelry of Overton parish, now West Overton, and became a separate civil parish in 1866. In 1934 the civil parishes of Alton Barnes and Alton Priors were abolished and merged to form the new civil parish of Alton.

In 1086, Domesday Book recorded two landholdings within Swanborough Hundred at Awltone: one corresponding to Alton Barnes, held by Edward of Salisbury, with 14 households and a mill; and another held by Winchester Abbey with 50 households and two mills. The association of the latter with the abbey led later to the name Alton Priors. The Wiltshire Victoria County History traces the later ownership of the manors: Alton Barnes was granted in 1385 by William of Wykeham to New College, Oxford which he had recently founded, and it remained in their ownership in 1970. Alton Priors remained with the abbey until the dissolution, then passed through several hands until the estate was bought by New College in 1912.

The Ridgeway, an ancient trackway, passes through Alton Barnes (although this section is not part of the Ridgeway National Trail, which begins further north). The Wansdyke, an early medieval earthwork, crosses the north of the parish on the Marlborough Downs.

Alton Barnes Manor Farmhouse (18th-century) and the Manor House at Alton Priors (c. 1830) are Grade II listed.

== Governance ==
Alton is a civil parish with an elected parish council. It is in the area of the Wiltshire Council unitary authority, which is responsible for all significant local government functions, and is represented in the council by Paul Oatway. For Westminster elections, the parish is within the East Wiltshire constituency.

== Parish churches ==
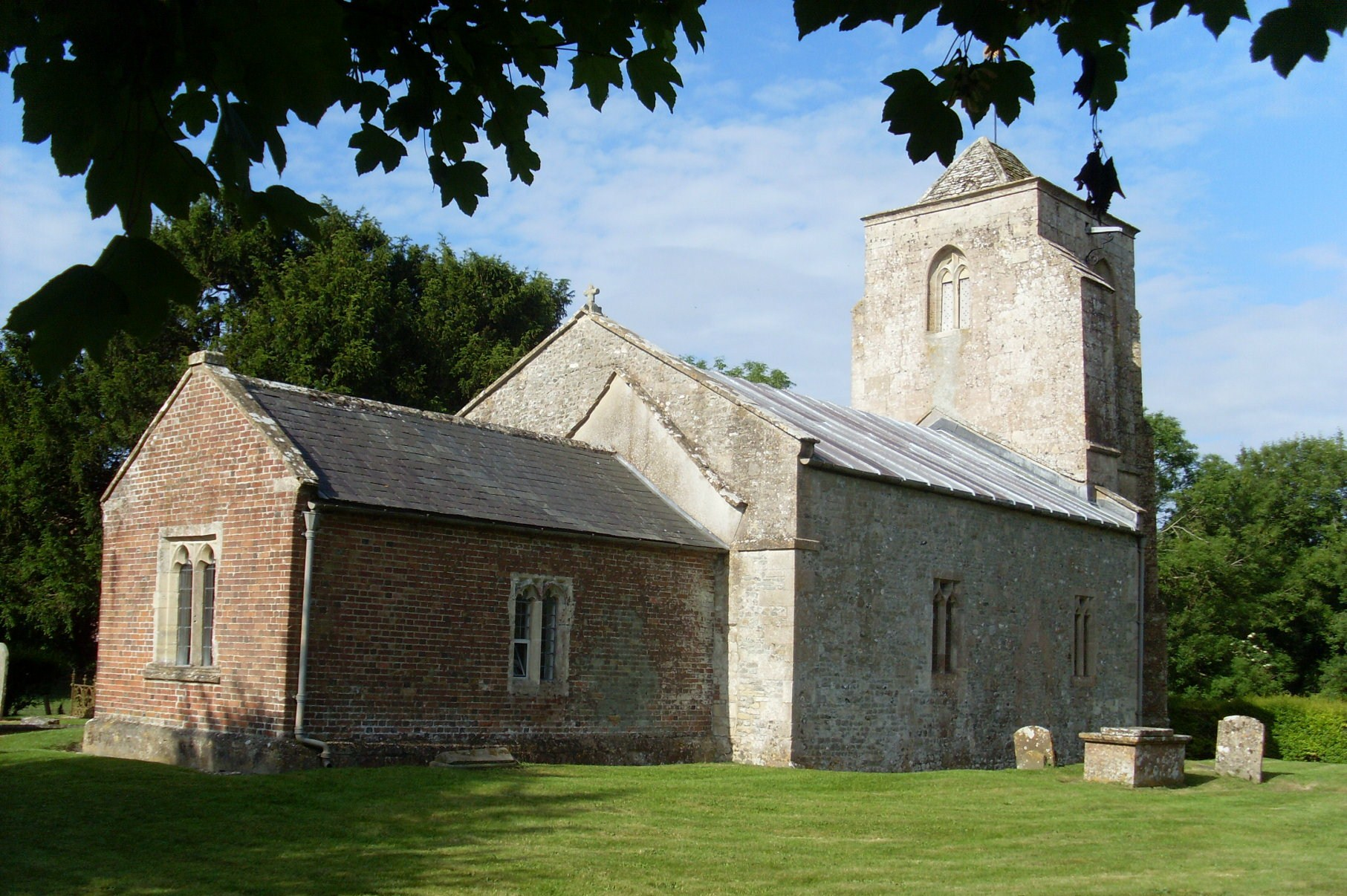
All Saints Church, Alton Priors

Both villages had a Church of England parish church; Alton Barnes church continues in use.

=== St Mary, Alton Barnes ===
The Church of St. Mary the Virgin in Alton Barnes is partly Saxon, built in the 10th and 11th centuries, although Domesday Book mentions no church. It has only a chancel, nave and west tower. The nave has characteristic Anglo-Saxon features: typically tall, narrow proportions and (visible at the west end) long-and-short quoins. The round-headed north doorway, now blocked and glazed, is another early feature.

The south door was added in the 14th century. The original chancel was as wide as the nave, but it was demolished and replaced with a brick one in 1748. The two bells are dated 1626 and 1788, and were rehung in the west gable in 1904.

There was a Saxon chancel arch but this was removed in 1832. There was a Victorian restoration in 1875, and a further restoration in 1904 directed by the local architect Charles Ponting. Pevsner assesses the nave as "over-restored" but praises its roof. The building was designated as Grade I listed in 1964.

=== All Saints, Alton Priors ===
Alton Priors' church was built in the 12th century and retains its original Norman chancel arch. The nave has two 14th-century ogee-headed windows and the west window is 15th-century. As at Alton Barnes, the original chancel has been demolished and replaced with one built of brick. There is a distinctive brass plaque to local landowner William Button (1526–1591), with complex artwork and inscription. All Saints was declared redundant in 1972 and was placed in the care of the Churches Conservation Trust. It is a Grade II* listed building.

=== Parish ===
Alton Priors was anciently a chapelry of Overton parish. In 1913, Alton Priors was annexed to Alton Barnes to form the parish of Alton Barnes with Alton Priors. The benefice was united with Stanton St Bernard in 1928, with the parsonage house at Stanton St Bernard to be sold, taking effect on the next vacancy (which occurred in 1932). At the same time, Honeystreet hamlet was brought into the parish from Woodborough and West Stowell hamlet was transferred to Wilsford.

A team ministry was established for the area in 1975, and today the parish is part of the Vale of Pewsey group, alongside 15 others.

== Notable buildings ==
The former Alton Barnes glebe house, now called the Old Rectory, stands west of the church. Built in vitrified brick with dressings in red brick and stone, it has two storeys with an attic. The five-bay east range is from the 1720s or 1730s, the rear block was added in 1785 and further alterations were made around the 1830s. Augustus William Hare, orator and writer, lived here c.1829 to 1833 during his rectorship, until his early death.

At Alton Priors, the limestone T-plan house known as the Manor House was built c.1830 in the north of the village; it is surrounded by an earlier walled garden and probably replaced an earlier house. The original manor house, now The Priory, stands by the stream that separates the two Altons; built in Flemish bond brickwork in the late 17th century, it was much reduced in size in the early 19th century. What remains is a four-bay block of two storeys with attic, and a single-storey kitchen wing.

== Canal ==
The Kennet and Avon Canal, opened in 1810, crosses the parish. A wharf at Honeystreet served the local area and a rural industrial area developed around it, including a firm of barge builders – Robbins, Lane, and Pinniger – who continued until the 1950s.

The Barge Inn was built at Honeystreet in 1858, replacing an earlier building, to cater for those living and working on the canal. It was designated as Grade II listed in 1987. In 2010, following the closure of the business, local volunteers successfully applied for funding to aid its reopening from the Village SOS lottery fund. In 2011 the project was the subject of episode 2 of Village SOS on BBC One. The group ceased to run the pub in October 2012, but it is still open, albeit in private hands, as of February 2024.

== Notable people ==
William Button (by 1503–1547, landowner) is buried in Alton Priors church, as is his son, also William (1526–1591). Both were Members of Parliament, as were two more family members: Ambrose (c.1549–c.1608) and Sir William Button, 1st Baronet (c.1584–1655).

Distinguished rectors of Alton Barnes include Richard Steward (c. 1593–1651, royalist churchman), rector from 1630; William Crowe (1745–1829, poet) from 1787; and Augustus William Hare (1792–1834, writer) from 1831.

== In popular culture ==
The Barge Inn at Honeystreet was a filming location for a 1998 episode of Inspector Morse, an adaptation of The Wench Is Dead. In 2013 the white horse, Adam's Grave and the Barge Inn featured in an episode of Walking Through History, presented by Tony Robinson on Channel 4.

== Amenities ==
The Barge Inn at Honeystreet is the sole pub in the parish. Alton Barnes has a village hall, the Coronation Hall, which was built in 1953 and extended in 2000.

The nearest primary school is at Woodborough. A Parochial school was opened at Alton Barnes in 1837 and closed in 1976 owing to falling pupil numbers.

== Alton Barnes White Horse ==
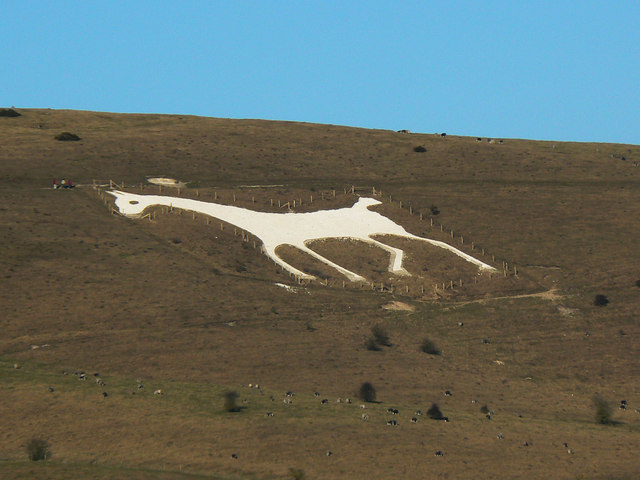
Alton Barnes White Horse from the southwest

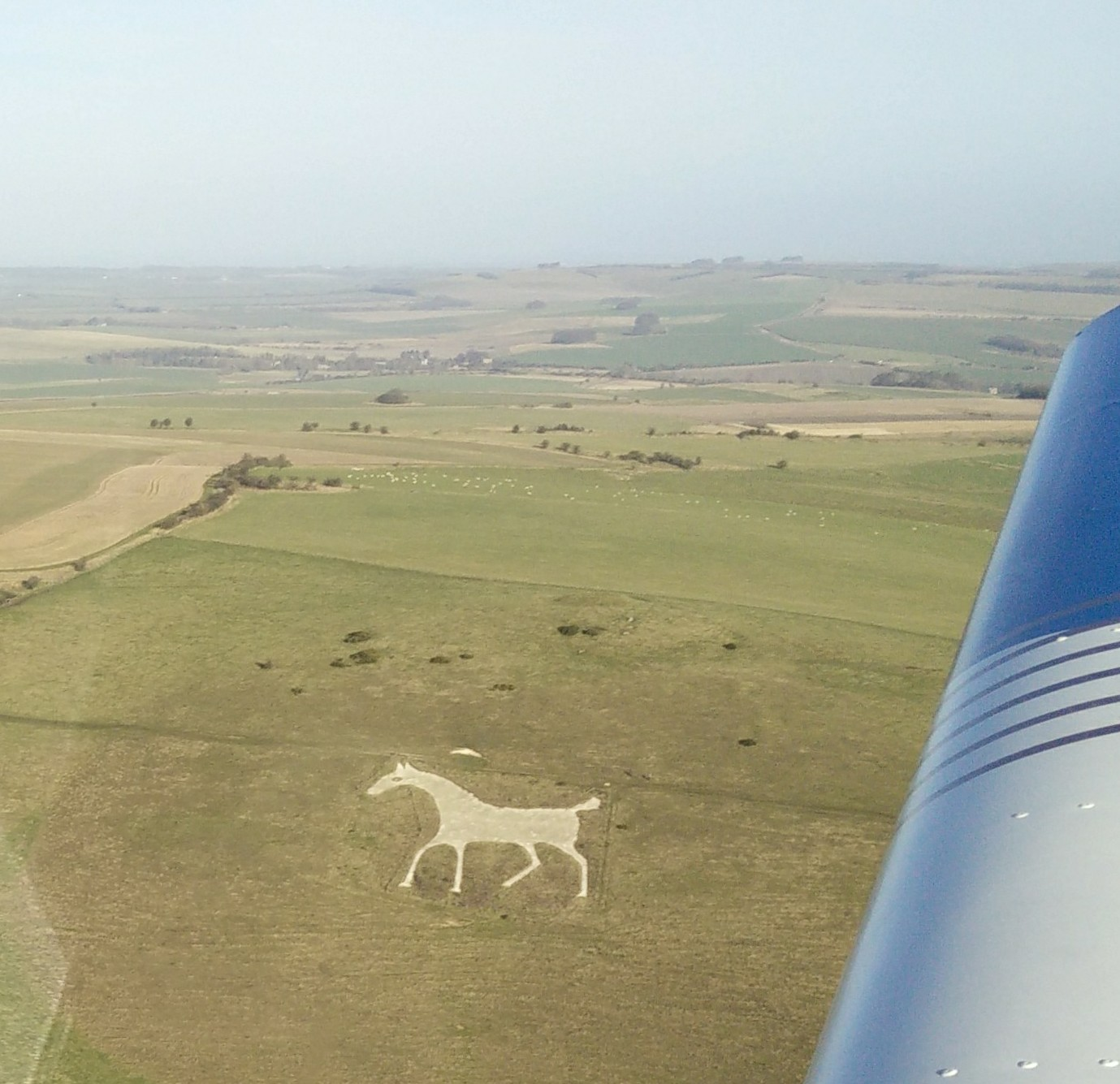
Aerial photo of the Alton Barnes White horse

There is a chalk hill figure of a horse dating from 1812 (51.37255°N 1.84789°W), a little more than 1000 m north of Alton. It is based on another white horse hill figure in Wiltshire, the Cherhill White Horse.

The figure is the third largest white horse in Wiltshire. The Pewsey White Horse can be seen from Milk Hill (the location of the horse). The figure is featured in Staying Out for the Summer, a music video for a song of the same name by Dodgy.

For April Fool's Day in 2003 and 2014, the horse was temporarily transformed into a zebra, on the latter occasion by applying black stripes, made from plastic sheeting, across the horse.

== Crop circles ==
Since the late 1970s Wiltshire has become known for crop circles (patterns created by flattening a crop, usually of cereal). In 1990 a pattern at Alton was used on the cover of the Box Set compilation by rock band Led Zeppelin.
