= John Erneley =

16th-century English politician

John Erneley (before 1522 – 1572), of Bishops Cannings, Wiltshire, was an English politician.

He was a member (MP) of the parliament of England for Wiltshire in 1559.
