= Thomas Gore (writer) =

English writer

Thomas Gore (1632–1684) was an English gentleman, known as a writer on heraldry.

== Life ==
Born at Alderton, Wiltshire, on 20 March 1631–2, he was the third son of Charles Gore, of Alderton, by his wife Lydias, daughter and heiress of William White, citizen and draper of London. By the deaths of two elder brothers, Charles and Edward, Gore became heir to the estate. After receiving some instruction from Thomas Tully at Tetbury grammar school he matriculated as gentleman-commoner of Magdalen College, Oxford, on 22 May 1650, and graduated B.A. From university he went to Lincoln's Inn.

After the death of his mother, 3 January 1655, Gore retired to his patrimony at Alderton, and devoted himself to the study of heraldry and antiquities. He was sworn a gentleman of the privy chamber in ordinary, 13 November 1667. In 1681 he was elected high sheriff of Wiltshire.

Gore was a friend of John Aubrey, but they eventually fell out. He died at Alderton, on 31 March 1684, and was buried in the church; his monument is against the north wall of the chancel. His library of books and manuscripts on heraldry passed eventually to George Montagu.

== Works ==
Gore published:

- Nomenclator Geographicus Latino-Anglicus et Anglico-Latinus, alphabeticè digestus; complectens plerorumque omnium M. Britanniæ & Hiberniæ regionum, comitatuum, episcopatuum, &c. nomina et appellationes, &c. (Series alphabetica Latino-Anglica nominum gentilit[i]orum, sive cognominum, plurimarum familiarum … quæ … in Anglia floruere, &c.) 2 pts., Oxford, 1667.
- Catalogus alphabeticè digestus, plerorumque omnium authorum qui de re heraldica Latinè, Gallicè, Italicè, Hispanicè, Germanicè, Anglicè, scripserunt: interspersis hic illic qui claruerunt in re antiquaria, ea saltem parte quæ heraldriæ facem accendit, Oxford, 1668. Another edition, enlarged, as Catalogus in certa capita, seu classes, alphabetico ordine concinatus, was issued, Oxford 1674.

He also published A Table shewing how to blazon a Coat ten several ways (1655), taken verbatim from Sir John Ferne's Blazon of Gentrie (1586). Some acts of his under-officers as sheriff led Gore to publish a declaration entitled Loyalty displayed, and Falshood unmask'd, … in a Letter to a Friend, London, 1681. Some of his manuscripts went to the British Museum; one, Spicilegia Heraldica, was sold in James Bindley's sale in December 1818.

== Family ==
By his marriage at Bristol, on 18 September 1656, to Mary, daughter of Michael Meredith, of Southwoode, Gloucestershire, by his wife Elizabeth, daughter of John Langton, alderman of Bristol, Gore had children:

- Thomas, born 17 December 1665 and married to Frances, fifth and youngest daughter of John Eyre of Little Cheldfield, Wiltshire;
- Edward, who died 22 September 1676; and
- Mary, born in February 1663, who became the wife of Thomas Polden of Imber.

His widow survived until 1717. The family in the direct line ending in a female, the estates fell into other hands.

== Notes ==
Attribution

This article incorporates text from a publication now in the public domain: Stephen, Leslie; Lee, Sidney, eds. (1890). "Gore, Thomas". Dictionary of National Biography. Vol. 22. London: Smith, Elder & Co.
