= William Button (died 1547) =

English politician

William Button (by 1503 – 27 March 1547) was an English landowner who was returned to parliament at one election.

He came from Alton Priors, near Devizes in Wiltshire. He was a member (MP) of the Parliament of England for Chippenham in 1529, and a justice of the peace from 1537.

He married Agnes Cater of Letcombe Regis, Berkshire, in or before 1525. She died in 1528; he died on 27 March 1547 and was buried with his wife in the choir of Alton Priors church. Their only son, also William (1526–1591) went on to be MP for Marlborough.
