= Ernest Button =

NZ international rugby league & union footballer

Personal information
- Full name: Ernest Linton Button
- Born: 8 October 1891 Lyttelton, New Zealand
- Died: 9 June 1960 (aged 68) Tītahi Bay, Wellington, New Zealand

Playing information
- Height: 177.8 cm (5 ft 10.0 in)
- Weight: 89.8 kg (14 st 2 lb)

Rugby union
Club
Years	Team	Pld	T	G	FG	P
1908–13	Christchurch RFC	70	11	1	0	35
1921	Christchurch RFC	8	1	0	0	3
	Total	78	12	1	0	38
Representative
Years	Team	Pld	T	G	FG	P
1909	Canterbury Town	1	0	0	0	0
1909	Canterbury	4	0	0	0	0

Rugby league
- Position: Hooker
Club
Years	Team	Pld	T	G	FG	P
1914	City (CRL)	6	0	1	0	2
1917	Linwood (CRL	2	0	0	0	0
	Total	8	0	1	0	2
Representative
Years	Team	Pld	T	G	FG	P
1914	Selected Team	3	0	0	0	0
1914	Canterbury	1	0	0	0	0
1914	New Zealand	1	0	0	0	0

Ernest Linton Button was a New Zealand rugby union and professional rugby league footballer who played representative rugby league (RL) for New Zealand. In doing so he became Kiwi #106. He began his career playing rugby union for the Christchurch rugby club in Christchurch. In 1909 he played for the Canterbury provincial rugby team. After switching to rugby league he played for the City club before representing the Canterbury representative side, and later, moving to the Linwood club.

== Personal life ==
Ernest Linton Button was born on 8 October 1891. His parents were Louisa Jane Button and Alfred Sampson Button. He had an older brother, Alfred Cleave Hammond (b.1886), and two older sisters, Mary (b.1888) and Minnie Clough (b.1884). Ernest Button married Bertha Freeman on 31 July 1918. She was the daughter of Jacob Freeman and Mary Jane Freeman. The marriage took place while Ernest was back from the war after having fallen seriously ill. He returned to the war 2 months later. On his enlistment form he stated that he was a tanner by trade. He died on 9 June 1960 aged 68 in Tītahi Bay, Wellington. He was living at 30 Te Pene, Avenue at the time of his death leaving behind his wife Bertha. Bertha died in 1968 aged 76.

== Playing career ==
=== Rugby union, Christchurch F.C. and Canterbury ===
Originally a rugby union player, Button represented Canterbury in 1909. Button began his senior career and 1908 aged just 17. He played in the fullback position in his early years before later moving into the forwards. His senior debut was on 9 May 1908 in a match for his Christchurch FC club against Merivale in a 3–3 draw. In total he played 8 matches for them in 1908, along with a 7-aside tournament and scored 2 tries.

In 1909 he played 13 matches for Christchurch FC scoring 4 tries. In August he was selected for the Canterbury Town side against Canterbury Country. The Town side won the match 12–6.

He then was chosen to make his debut for Canterbury in their match with Wellington on 4 September. Wellington won the match, played at Lancaster Park by 11 points to 6 with Button playing in the forwards. Button was picked for the Canterbury team to tour the South. He played against South Canterbury in Timaru on 16 September with Canterbury going down 9–6. Their next match was in Dunedin against Otago. Canterbury lost once again, this time by 9 points to 3 with Button in the forwards. Button wasn't selected for their final tour match against Southland in Invercargill but he came on to replace Mitchell who had injured his ankle in their 6–5 win to end their tour.

Interestingly despite his young age Button was not selected for Canterbury ever again. Over the 1910–13 seasons he played 49 games for the Christchurch FC side without making any representative appearances whatsoever. In a 12 June match against Old Boys he injured his knee and did not play again for them that season.

=== Switch to rugby league, City club, Canterbury selection and move to Linwood RLFC ===
Button switched codes and played for City in the Canterbury Rugby League in 1914. At the beginning of the season a meeting was held with Button in Attendance regarding the formation of the City club. There were 4 existing league teams all located in the suburbs and it was felt that a city team was needed. Button was appointed the convener of the committee and was also the City delegate to the management committee of the league.

City were having an unsuccessful season and lost their first 5 matches in the Thacker Shield but Button was chosen to play in a 'Selected Team' to play the league leading Sydenham side made up of players from the other teams. The match was played at the Canterbury Showgrounds and saw the Sydenham side win 9–5. The same two teams met again 2 days later with Button selected in the forwards once more. Button was then chosen in the Canterbury team to meet Wellington on 25 July. Wellington won the match by 13 points to 3 at the Christchurch Showgrounds. He finished the year playing for the Selected Team against Sydenham once again on 8 August. This was to be his last game of rugby league for some time as he joined the war effort and left for Europe months later.

Button later joined Linwood during a return from the war due to illness. He was registered with the club on 8 July 1917 and played 2 matches for them on 15 July and 22 July against Federal and Sydenham respectively.

Button then returned to the war and once he returned again he did not play for them again and he returned to rugby union.

=== New Zealand selection ===
Following Button's matches for the 'Selected Team' and his City club he was chosen to represent New Zealand against the touring England side. His selection was something of a surprise and it was said "Button, selected as a forward, will have a strenuous task to keep pace with the other forwards selected. His inclusion caused a surprise, as the general opinion was that H. Shanks would be the forward selected from Christchurch". The test match was played at the Auckland Domain on 1 August in front of 20,000 spectators. England won an extremely competitive game 16–13 with the New Zealand team given great respect for their play. The England captain Wagstaff said after the match that it was the hardest they had played on tour which included 18 matches across Australia and New Zealand. Button was playing in the hooker position and saved New Zealand late in the game when England were close to scoring. It was said later that the New Zealand forwards had al been outstanding and "Button, Banks, and Mitchell all proved the wisdom of their selection".

== War Efforts ==
=== World War 1 ===
Ernest Button enlisted in the New Zealand forces for World War 1 early on. He embarked from Wellington on 17 April 1915 as a Gunner in the New Zealand Field Artillery as part of the 4th Reinforcements. He became ill and was transported to Malta on 15 October 1915 before recovering and progressing on to Alexandria, Egypt. He was then reported seriously ill on 2 November with his parents receiving a cabled message from Malta General Hospital. He had "enteric fever" (Typhoid). He was however showing some improvement while in hospital and was removed from the dangerous list on 9 November and embarked for Alexandria on 14 December. He was then invalided to New Zealand on 26 December. It had been thought that he was likely to die and he had been treated for 3 months in army hospitals in England and Sister Holmes, of the English R.A.M.C had been "untiring" in her efforts to bring him back to health.

After returning to New Zealand he had spent time recovering and on 8 July 1917 he was well enough to join the Linwood rugby league club and play 2 games for them in the same month. He was officially discharged on 31 July 1916 with it stated that he was no longer physically fit for war service on account of wounds received in action and illness contracted on active service.

He was nearly discharged from the service after "absenting himself without leave from 20 to 29 April 1918" according to image 19 of his military files. When he returned to the war he embarked on board the Matatua on 2 October 1918, arriving on 5 December 1918. By this stage he was a Quartermaster Sergeant in the 43rd Reinforcements, New Zealand Field Artillery.

Button was discharged on 25 August 1919. He was awarded the 1914–15 Star, British War Medal and the Victory Medal.

=== World War 2 ===
Following Button's return from World War 1 he had embarked on a medical career. In 1920 he was studying Physics and Inorganic Chemistry. He received his medical degree on 17 December 1925.

Button completed his English F.R.C.S in May 1931. It was stated that he had been educated at Wellington and Otago University and served as a surgeon at Wellington Hospital for 2 years. It was also said that he expected to return to New Zealand at the end of the year. He was granted a Diplomas of Fellowship of the Royal College of Surgeons after successfully passing the exam in June, 1931 in London.

In 1941 he was granted the temporary rank of Lieutenant-colonel while holding the appointment of officer in charge of the surgical division, No. 3 NZ General Hospital. Then in July 1942 he became lieutenant-colonel.
