= Archibald Button =

English cricketer

Archibald Button (born 1770) was an English amateur cricketer who made two known appearances from 1798 to 1804.

He was mainly associated with Hampshire.

== Bibliography ==
- Haygarth, Arthur (1996) [1862]. Scores & Biographies, Volume 1 (1744–1826). Kennington: Frederick Lillywhite. ISBN 978-19-00592-23-9.
- Haygarth, Arthur (1997) [1862]. Scores & Biographies, Volume 2 (1827–1840). Kennington: Frederick Lillywhite. ISBN 978-19-00592-23-9.
