= Sturton =

Sturton may refer to:

== Places ==
- Sturton le Steeple, a village in Nottinghamshire, England
- Great Sturton, hamlet in the county of Lincolnshire, England
- Sturton by Stow, a village and civil parish in the West Lindsey district of Lincolnshire, England
- Sturton Grange, civil parish in the City of Leeds in West Yorkshire, England

== People ==
- Catriona Sturton (born 1976), Canadian blues and indie rock musician
- Edmund Sturton (C15–C16), English composer
