= Reginald Stourton =

English knight (born 1434)

Sir Reginald Stourton of Stourton, Wiltshire (born c. 1434) was an English knight.

== Life ==
Stourton was the second son of John Stourton, 1st Baron Stourton and Margery or Marjory Wadham.

Stourton was knighted and became High Sheriff of Wiltshire in 1455–1456 and 1462–1463.

In the spring of 1470, he was arrested on the orders of King Edward IV as one of the Lancastrian supporters of the Earl of Warwick.
