= William Button (1526–1591) =

English politician

William Button (1526–1591) was the member (MP) of the Parliament of England for Marlborough in the parliament of March 1553.

He was the only son of William Button (died 1547), who sat as MP for Chippenham. He was bailiff of Heytesbury by October 1553, sheriff in Wiltshire in 1564–65 and 1570–71, and a justice of the peace. He owned property at Marlborough and Alton Priors, both in Wiltshire, and later bought further manors in Berkshire, Dorset and Wiltshire. He made his will on the day of his death at Rood Ashton, Wiltshire and was buried at Alton Priors.

His son Ambrose Button (c. 1549 – after 1608) was the MP for Malmesbury in the parliament of 1571. Ambrose was disinherited by his father in 1591 in favour of his brother, also William, causing the Privy Council to summon William senior to London to explain matters. They informed him that Queen Elizabeth "much disliked" the action, and that Ambrose was "known to some at court to be of very good behaviour and well affected in religion, perhaps better given" than William junior. The disinheritance was not reversed, however.
