= Button baronets =

Extinct baronetcy in the Baronetage of England

The Button Baronetcy, of Alton in the County of Wiltshire, was a title in the Baronetage of England. It was created on 18 March 1622 for Sir William Button, Member of Parliament for Morpeth and Wiltshire. The third Baronet was High Sheriff of Wiltshire from 1670 to 1671. The title became extinct on the death of the fourth Baronet in 1712.

== Button baronets, of Alton (1622) ==
- Sir William Button, 1st Baronet (c. 1584–1655)
- Sir William Button, 2nd Baronet (c. 1614–1660)
- Sir Robert Button, 3rd Baronet (1622–c. 1679)
- Sir John Button, 4th Baronet (died 1712)
