= Christopher Perkins (priest) =

English priest, diplomat and MP

Sir Christopher Perkins (or Parkins) (1547? – 1622) was an English Jesuit turned diplomat and MP.

== Life ==
He was educated at Oxford, and graduated B.A. on 7 April 1565; but on 21 October next year he entered the Society of Jesus at Rome, aged 19. According to Charles Dodd, he was among the Jesuits for many years; but gradually he became estranged from them, and while at Venice, perhaps about 1585, he wrote a book on the society; it does not appear to have been published.

It took generally favourable view, but seems to have been subsequently thought by the English government likely to prove damaging. About the same time William Cecil visited Rome; Perkins intervened when his religious opinions created a difficult situation. Perkins is said then to have returned with young Cecil, who recommended him to his grandfather Lord Burghley's favour.

=== Return to England ===
In 1587 he was resident at Prague, being described in the government's list of recusants abroad as a Jesuit. There he became acquainted with Edward Kelley, who in June 1589 accused him of being an emissary of the pope, and of complicity in a plot to murder Queen Elizabeth. Soon afterwards Perkins arrived in England, and seems to have been imprisoned on suspicion. On 12 March 1590 he wrote to Francis Walsingham, undermining Kelley and appealing to a commendation from the King of Poland as proof of his innocence and abandoned his religious vows and former faith. On 9 May he was granted expenses for a mission to Poland and Prussia.

=== Diplomatic agent ===
From this time Perkins was frequently employed as a diplomatic agent to Denmark, Poland, Rudolf II, Holy Roman Emperor, and the Hanseatic League; his missions dealt principally with commercial affairs. In 1591 he was ambassador to Denmark, having his first audience with the king on 4 July, and on 22 December received an annuity of one hundred marks for his services.

He proceeded to Poland in January 1592, and was in Denmark again in the summer. In June and July 1593 he was negotiating with the Emperor at Prague; in 1595 he visited Elbing, Lübeck, and other Hanse towns, and spent some time in Poland. He says he was acceptable to the Poles generally, and the king tried to induce him to enter his service; but (on his own account) the clergy were bitterly hostile (records of the time show the political world found him troublesome as well), and the Pope offered put a price on his head. In 1598 he was again sent to Denmark, returning on 8 December; in 1600 he was employed in negotiating with the Danish emissaries at Emden. He acted as principal adviser to the government in its mercantile relations with the Baltic countries; on 3 January 1593 he was on a commission to decide without appeal all disputes between the English and subjects of the French king in reference to piracy, and on 3 July was on another to inquire into and punish all abettors of pirates.

=== Numerous titles ===
Perkins was appointed as Dean of Carlisle in 1595. On 20 February 1597 he was admitted member of Gray's Inn. On 16 Sept. 1597 he was elected M.P. for Ripon, and again on 21 October 1601; he frequently took part in the mercantile business of the House of Commons. On the accession of James I his annuity was increased; in 1603 he was on a commission for suppressing books printed without authority; on 23 July he was knighted by the king at Whitehall, and on 20 March 1605 was admitted commoner of the college of advocates. From 1604 to 1611 he was M.P. for Morpeth; he also acted as deputy to Sir Daniel Donne, master of requests, whom he succeeded in 1617. In 1620 he subscribed to the Virginia Company.

== Death ==
He died late in August 1622, and was buried on 1 September on the north side of the long aisle in Westminster Abbey.

== Family ==
Perkins married, possibly for the second time, on 5 November 1617, at St. Martin's-in-the-Fields, London, Anne, daughter of Anthony Beaumont of Glenfield, Leicestershire, and widow of James Brett of Hoby in the same county. She was sister of the Countess of Buckingham, whose son, George Villiers, became Duke of Buckingham, and mother, by her first husband, of Anne, second wife of Lionel Cranfield, 1st Earl of Middlesex. She survived him.

== See also ==
Church of England titles
Preceded by John Wolley	Dean of Carlisle; 1596 – 1622	Succeeded by Francis White
