= William Collingbourne =

English landowner

William Collingborn (c. 1435–1484) was an English landowner and administrator. He was an opponent of King Richard III – corresponding with his enemies and penning a famous lampoon – and was eventually executed for treason.

== Family background and marriage ==
Collingbourne's family originated from the villages bearing their name – Collingbourn Abbas and Collingbourne Ducis in Wiltshire. His first known ancestor was a Thomas Colynborn of Marleberg (Marlborough), who lived before 1377. Thomas' grandson Richard Collingbourne, of Bedewynde (Great Bedwyn), was Clerk of the Peace in Wiltshire in 1390, Member of Parliament for Marlborough in 1402 and Collector of Taxes in 1413 and 1417. He married Jean Russel and had three sons called Robert, John and William. This William attended college 1422–1427 and received several offices from 1441 to 1462. However, he was probably not the William Collingbourne of historical fame but rather his uncle, as a namesake is mentioned as the son of Robert Collingbourne.

Sometime before 1474, he married Margaret, daughter and heiress of John Norwood and widow to a Sir James Pykeryng. From her first marriage, Margaret had at least two children – Edward and Elen. Her second marriage produced two daughters: Margaret, who later married a George Chaderton, and Jane, who married a James Louder or Lowther, MP for Marlborough in 1491–92.

== Land owner and administrator ==
According to the sources, a William Collingbourne amassed land in north-east Wiltshire, but also acquired property in the City of London. In the 1470s, he was commissioner in the enquiry of farms for land grants and money in Wiltshire and involved in actions against trespasses and debts, mostly against defendants from Kent, which suggests that he had acquired property in that county as well.

Collingbourne held several administrative posts in Wiltshire; he served as sheriff in 1474 and 1481 and as Commissioner of Peace in 1475 and 1478–1481. In 1475 he was named as one who would "enquire into certain treasons, Lolardries, heresies and errors" in Dorset and Wiltshire, in a list that also included King Edward's brothers, the Dukes of Clarence and Gloucester. After the execution of Clarence in 1478, Collingbourne was among those enquiring into his possession in the counties of Southampton and Wiltshire. In 1481 and 1482, he is mentioned as being in charge of two manors in Wiltshire. After the death of Edward IV in April 1483, he appointed to a Commission "to assess certain subsidies granted to the late King by the commons of the realm" and, in July, once more Commissioner of Peace.

== Opponent of Richard III ==
In June 1483, the Duke of Gloucester came to the throne as King Richard III. Soon afterwards, Collingbourne positioned himself in opposition of the new King. In October, he was most probably involved in the Duke of Buckingham's revolt in favour of Henry Tudor. Both Walter Hungerford and John Cheyne, who had served with Collingbourne on the commissions of 1478 and April 1483, were among the leaders of the revolt.

Around 10 July in either 1483 or 1484, Collingbourne asked a Thomas Yate to contact Henry Tudor, the Marquess of Dorset and other opponents of Richard, "to declare unto them that they should very well to return into England with all such power as they might get before the feast of St Luke the Evangelist [18 October] next ensuring" and furthermore to advise the French king, that negotiations with Richard were useless as the new King meant to make war on France.

The year of this correspondence is a matter of controversy: James Gairdner placed it in context of Buckingham's rebellion – during which Henry Tudor indeed tried to land at – and hence dated in July 1483. Gairdner argued, among other things, that Collingbourne's correspondence located Henry Tudor at Brittany (which he had left in 1484) and that Henry's attempt to land at Poole in Dorset in November 1483 corresponds with Collingbourne's message. Such an interpretation would put the letter in the immediate aftermath of Richard's coronation on 6 July and before the new King set out for his royal progress; this would make Collingbourne – in Gairdner's words – "almost the very first man to make any move against the usurper". Accordingly, Gairdner's interpretation has been contradicted by other historians, most notably Paul Murray Kendall, who dated the treasonous correspondence in July 1484 and thus in context of his lampoon. Kendall argued both the Marquess of Dorset's joining of Henry Tudor and negotiations with French ambassadors occurred only in 1484, whereas the mentioning of Brittany and Poole was not conclusive evidence.

Collingbourne was indicted not only for his correspondence with Henry Tudor, but also for "writing various bills and writings in rhyme", without specifying the rhymes. Robert Fabyan's chronicle, published in 1516, first relate that in July 1484, Collingbourne pinned the following lampoon to the door of St. Paul's Cathedral:

The Catte, the Ratte and Lovell our dogge rulyth all Englande under a hogge.

The rhyme attacked King Richard and his three principal aides by referring to their names and heraldic emblems: the "hog" of course referred to King Richard, whose badge was a white boar, the "Lovell our dog" to Francis Viscount Lovell, who was Richard's closest associate and had a silver wolf as emblem. The "cat" and the "rat" made fun of the names of William Catesby, who furthermore had a white cat as his badge, and Richard Ratcliffe. The two-liner was later embellished, amended with an explanation, supposedly by the author himself, and included in the Mirror for Magistrates.

The reasons for Collingbourne's enmity are not entirely clear. In 1892, James H. Ramsay suggested that the lampoon was written "in revenge for the loss of offices in Wiltshire". Collingbourne's name does not appear among the commissions of peace in December 1483. Furthermore, in a letter of 3 June 1484, by King Richard asked his mother Cecily Neville, Duchess of York that "my lord Chamberlain ... be your officer in Wiltshire in such as Colyngbourne had". This suggests that Collingbourne had been steward of the Duchess' Wiltshire lands and that both his correspondence and his lampoon were written in response to having lost this position. This loss may have been linked to his involvement in Buckingham's rebellion, either because he was dismissed or because he went into hiding. If his post was eventually filled by the Lord Chamberlain, Francis Viscount Lovell, this would further explain Collingbourne's ire against Richard's closest associate.

== Trial and execution ==
In October or November Collingbourne was arrested together with a shipowner named John Turburvyle, charged with treason and put before a commission of oyer and terminer, which included the Dukes of Suffolk, Norfolk, the Earls of Surrey and Nottingham, the Viscounts Lovell and Lisle, three barons including Lord High Constable Thomas Stanley and five justices of the King's Bench, including chief justice William Hussey. The trial was held in early December at the Guildhall; Collingbourne was convicted of high treason and sentenced to death, Turburvyle sentenced to prison, apparently on a lesser charge.

Collingbourne was subsequently executed at Tower Hill by hanging, drawing and quartering. A story by Tudor historian John Stow recounts his end: "After having been hanged, he was cut down immediately and his entrails were then extracted and thrown into the fire, and all this was so speedily done that when the executioners pulled out his heart he spoke and said, 'Oh Lord Jesus, yet more trouble!'"

Tudor author Edward Hall relates that he was executed merely "for making a small rhyme", a claim taken up by later authors, but historian Charles Ross pointed out that Hall "carefully suppresses the fact that the real indictment against him was that he had been encouraging Henry Tudor to land at Poole".
