= John Cornwell =

John Cornwell may refer to:

- Jack Cornwell (1900–1916), a British boy sailor posthumously awarded the Victoria Cross for gallantry at the Battle of Jutland
- John J. Cornwell (1867–1953), American politician, Governor of West Virginia
- John Cornwell (writer) (born 1940), British journalist, author, and academic
- John Cornwell (footballer) (born 1964), English footballer
- John Cornwell (artist) (1930–2020), Australian artist

== See also ==
- John Cornwall (disambiguation)
