= John Cornwall =

John Cornwall may refer to:

- John Cornwall (died 1414), English politician
- John Cornwall, 1st Baron Fanhope (c. 1364 – 1443), English soldier
- John Cornwall (died 1608), English politician
- John Cornwall (Upper Canada politician) (fl. 1797 – 1800)
- John Cornwall (South Australian politician) (1935–2018)

== See also ==
- John Cornwell (disambiguation), various people
- John of Cornwall (disambiguation), various people
