= William Hungate =

William Hungate may refer to:

- William L. Hungate, US Representative
- William Hungate (MP), member of the Parliament of England for Marlborough
