= Robert Warner =

Robert Warner may refer to:

== Politicians ==
- Robert Warner (fl. 1390), MP for Marlborough
- Robert Warner (MP, born 1510) (1510–1575), MP Chippenham 1545, Wilton 1547, Downton March 1553 and Bossiney 1559

== Others ==
- Robert M. Warner (1927–2007), sixth archivist of the United States
- Bob Warner (24), fictional character on the American television series 24
- Bob Warner (ice hockey) (born 1950), former National Hockey League forward
- Robert Warner (actor) (born 1937), Canadian actor in Corwin (TV series) etc.

== See also ==
- Rob Warner (disambiguation)
