= Richard Digges =

English lawyer and politician

Richard Digges (died 1634) was an English lawyer and politician who sat in the House of Commons from 1597 to 1629.

Digges was the son John Digges of Purton, Wiltshire and his wife Elizabeth Noddall, of Yorkshire. He was educated at Oxford University and was awarded BA on 27 May 1579. He studied law at New Inn and then at Lincoln's Inn in 1581 and was called to the bar in 1589. In November 1590 Digges was employed as an Exchequer surveyor by Lord Burghley.

In 1597, he was elected Member of Parliament for Marlborough and was re-elected in every election until 1628. He was of counsel to Marlborough before 1603 and became Mayor of Marlborough in 1608. He was a bencher of Lincoln's Inn and autumn reader in 1608 and in 1614 Keeper of the Black Book. He was treasurer from 1616 to 1617 and Lent reader in 1619. He became serjeant-at-law in 1623.

Digges was buried at Marlborough on 26 January 1634. He had married firstly Margaret Gore, daughter of Richard Gore of Aldrington, Wiltshire and had a son and two daughters. He married secondly Elizabeth Waldron, daughter of Thomas Waldron.

Parliament of England
Preceded by Richard Wheler; Anthony Hungerford	Member of Parliament for Marlborough; 1597–1629; With: Richard Wheler 1597; Lawrence Hyde 1601–1611; Sir Francis Popham 1614; William Seymour, Lord Beauchamp 1621; Walter Devereux 1621–1622; Sir Francis Seymour 1624; Edward Kyrton 1625–1626; Henry Piercy	Parliament suspended until 1640
