= Richard Ratcliffe =

15th-century English royal official and confidant

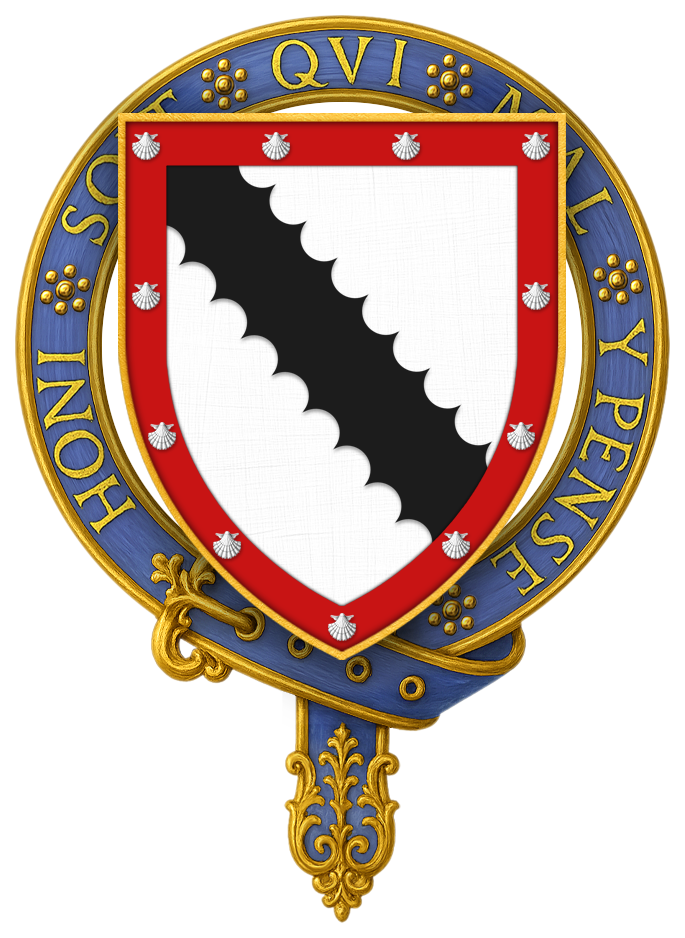
Coat of arms of Sir Richard Ratcliffe, KG

Sir Richard Ratcliffe, KG (died 22 August 1485) was a close confidant of Richard III of England.

== Life ==
Ratcliffe came from a gentry family in the Lake District, and became a companion of Richard when the latter was still Duke of Gloucester (1461–83). He was one of Richard's trustees in the lordship of Richmond, and was named steward of Barnard Castle. Richard, while Duke of Gloucester, knighted Ratcliffe during the Scottish campaigns, at the same time creating him a knight banneret.

During the ascension to power by Richard III, Ratcliffe was chosen to return to the north and organize an army to help the Protector, as Richard III was then titled. Some sources name Ratcliffe as the person who gave the order to execute Anthony Woodville, 2nd Earl Rivers (beheaded Jun 1483).

When Richard became king he gave Ratcliffe a number of offices, including the currently attainted hereditary High Sheriff of Westmorland, and made him a Knight of the Garter. He also received a large grant of lands, including much that had belonged to the Courtenay Earls of Devon. After the rebellion of 1483 he was given a very large number of forfeited estates. As a result, he had an income larger than most barons.

In July 1484, William Collingbourne, a Tudor agent, nailed a lampooning poem to St Paul's Cathedral, London, which obliquely identifies Ratcliffe as one of the three aides to King Richard:

The Catte, the Ratte and Lovell our dogge rulyth all Englande under a hogge.

The "catte" alludes to William Catesby; the "ratte" to Ratcliffe; and "Lovell" to Francis, Viscount Lovell, one of whose heraldic family devices was a white wolf (the "dogge"). The "hogge" alludes to King Richard and his badge of a white boar. The poem was interpolated into Laurence Olivier's film Richard III, a screen adaptation of Shakespeare's play.

Ratcliffe married Agnes Scrope, daughter of Henry Scrope, 4th Baron Scrope of Bolton, one of the great barons in the north of England.

Ratcliffe was one of the two councillors (the other was William Catesby) who are reputed to have told the king that marrying Elizabeth of York would cause rebellions in the north.

Ratcliffe was killed at the Battle of Bosworth Field, on 22 August 1485.

== Shakespeare play ==
Ratcliffe appears in William Shakespeare's play Richard III as a minor character who executes Rivers, Grey and Vaughn. In the Andrew Wise 1597 (first) edition, Sir Richard's character appears first as Sir Richard Ratliffe (without the 'c') then as plain Ratcliffe (with the 'c', but no 'Sir' nor 'Richard') and finally as plain Ratliffe.

In the 1995 film version (starring Ian McKellen, and adapted to a 1930s setting), Ratcliffe is portrayed by Bill Paterson, and acts as (King) Richard's batman.
