= Jeffrey Daniel (MP) =

Jeffrey Daniel (29 June 1626 – 22 April 1681) was an English politician who sat in the House of Commons in 1660.

Daniel was the son of William Daniel of St. Margett, Wiltshire. He matriculated at Magdalen College, Oxford, on 20 May 1642 aged 15.

In 1660, Daniel was elected Member of Parliament for Marlborough in the Convention Parliament. He was re-elected MP for Marlborough in 1661 for the Cavalier Parliament and sat until 1679.

Daniel died at the age of 54.

Daniel was the father of William who was also MP for Marlborough.
