= Edward Darrell =

Edward Darrell may refer to:

- Edward Darrell (died 1573), MP for Plympton Erle
- Edward Darrell (died 1530), MP for Wiltshire

== See also ==
- Edmund Darrell, MP
