= Walter Devereux, 5th Viscount Hereford =

English politician

Sir Walter Devereux, 5th Viscount Hereford, 2nd Baronet of Castle Bromwich (c. 1575 – 1656), was an English politician who sat in the House of Commons at various times, between 1614 and 1624, before succeeding to the family Viscountcy in the peerage of England.

== Life ==
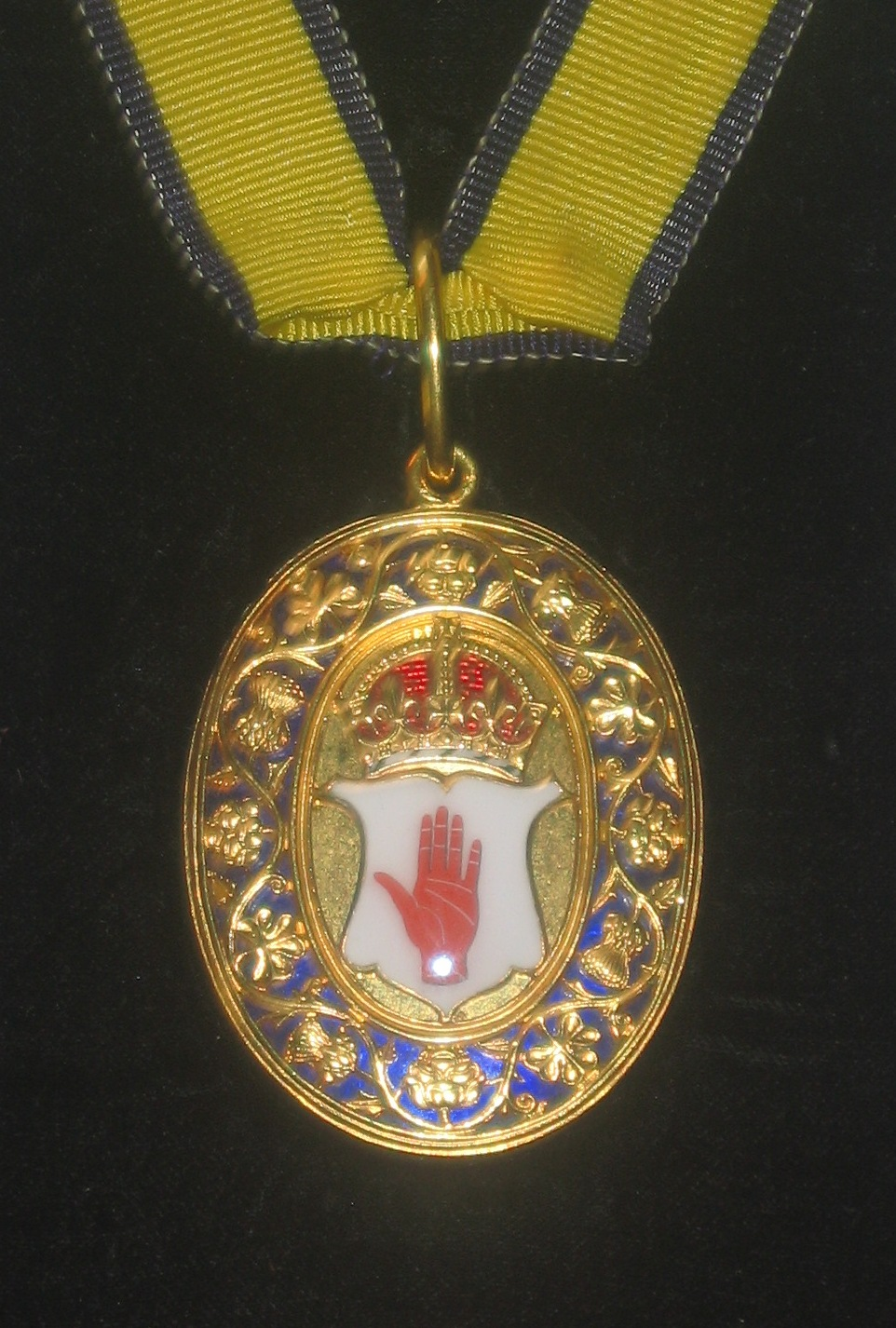

The son of Sir Edward Devereux, of Castle Bromwich, Warwickshire, and his wife Catherine née Arden, he was grandson of Sir Walter Devereux, cr. Viscount Hereford in 1550. He succeeded his father in 1622 as 2nd baronet, later inheriting in 1646 the title of his first cousin twice removed as Viscount Hereford.

Devereux previously served as Member of Parliament (MP) for Stafford in 1614, before being elected in 1621 as MP for Marlborough, and in 1624 as MP for Worcestershire then in 1625 MP for Worcester. He also served as High Sheriff of Worcestershire in 1625.

When Robert Devereux, 3rd Earl of Essex died in 1646, Sir Walter succeeded as 5th Viscount Hereford, but not to his earldom to which he was not in remainder and which became extinct. Lord Hereford was appointed as Lord Lieutenant of Monmouthshire in 1646 and became a member of the Radnorshire Militia Committee in 1648.

== Family ==
Devereux married twice, firstly, Elizabeth Baspole, daughter of Robert Baspole and secondly, Elizabeth Knightley, daughter of Thomas Knightley. With the latter he had three sons:

- Essex Devereux (1615–1639) who married Anne daughter of Sir William Courteen and Anne Tryon but drowned while boating leaving one daughter, Elizabeth. Anne married secondly Sir Richard Knightley;
- Leicester Devereux, 6th Viscount Hereford who succeeded him, and;
- Walter Devereux (1621–1683), MP for Orford.

== See also ==
- Devereux baronets
- Earl of Essex

Parliament of England
Preceded by George Cradock; Arthur Ingram	Member of Parliament for Stafford; 1614; With: Thomas Gibbs	Succeeded by Matthew Cradock; Richard Dyott
Preceded by Richard Digges; William Seymour, Lord Beauchamp	Member of Parliament for Marlborough; 1621–1622; With: Richard Digges	Succeeded by Richard Digges; Sir Francis Seymour
Preceded by Sir Thomas Lyttelton; Sir Samuel Sandys	Member of Parliament for Worcestershire; 1624; With: Sir Thomas Lyttelton	Succeeded by Sir Thomas Lyttelton; William Russell
Peerage of England
Preceded by Robert Devereux	Viscount Hereford; 1646–1658	Succeeded by Leicester Devereux
Baronetage of England
Preceded by Edward Devereux	Baronet (of Castle Bromwich); 1622–1658	Succeeded by Leicester Devereux
