= Robert Warner (fl. 1390) =

English politician

Robert Warner (fl. 1390), of Marlborough, Wiltshire, was an English politician.

He was a member (MP) of the parliament of England for Marlborough in January 1390. In 1388–89, he was Mayor of Marlborough.

Parliament of England
Preceded by John Curteys; John Wyly	Member of Parliament for Marlborough; Jan. 1390; With: Thomas Calston	Succeeded by ? ?
