= Curteys =

Curteys is a surname. Notable people with the surname include:

- Richard Curteys (c. 1532 – 1582), English churchman
- Griffin Curteys (by 1521 – 1587), English estate steward
- John Curteys (MP for Lostwithiel), member of Parliament for Lostwithiel
- John Curteys (MP for Marlborough), member of Parliament for Marlborough
