= Rob Warner =

Rob Warner may refer to:

- Rob Warner (footballer) (born 1977), English retired footballer
- Rob Warner (mountain biker) (born 1970), English mountain biker, motocross rider and TV presenter
- Rob Warner (academic) (born 1956), vice-chancellor of Plymouth Marjon University

== See also ==
- Robert Warner (disambiguation)
