= Francis Baskerville =

English politician

Francis Baskerville (born 1615) was an English politician who sat in the House of Commons in 1640.

Baskerville was the son of Thomas Baskerville of Richardston, Wiltshire, and his wife, Joan Lor.

In April 1640, Baskerville was elected as a Member of Parliament for Marlborough in the Short Parliament.

Baskerville married Margaret Glanville, daughter of Sir John Glanville of Broad Hinton, Wiltshire, in April 1635.

Parliament of England
Vacant Parliament suspended since 1629	Member of Parliament for Marlborough; 1640; With: Sir William Carnaby	Succeeded by John Francklyn; Sir Francis Seymour
