= Richard Frys =

Member of the Parliament of England

Richard Frys was a weaver and the member of the Parliament of England for Marlborough for the parliaments of April 1384 and 1394.
