= Edward Goddard =

Former English parliamentarian

Edward Goddard (died 10 June 1679) was the member of the Parliament of England for Marlborough for the parliament of March 1679.
