= Robert Bithway =

16th-century English politician

Robert Bithway (by 1517 – 1557) was a tanner and the member of the Parliament of England for Marlborough for the parliament of October 1553.

He was mayor of Marlborough in 1555–56.
