= John Francklyn =

English politician

John Francklyn (c. 1564 – 1645) was an English politician who sat in the House of Commons from 1640 to 1644.

Francklyn was of Wiltshire. He matriculated at Magdalen Hall, Oxford on 18 May 1582, aged 18.

In November 1640, Francklyn was elected Member of Parliament for Marlborough in the Long Parliament. He sat until his death in 1645.

Parliament of England
Preceded by Sir William Carnaby; Francis Baskerville	Member of Parliament for Marlborough; 1640–1645; With: Sir Francis Seymour 1640; Philip Smith 1641–1645	Succeeded by Charles Fleetwood; Philip Smith
