= Francis Lovell, 1st Viscount Lovell =

English nobleman (1456–1487)

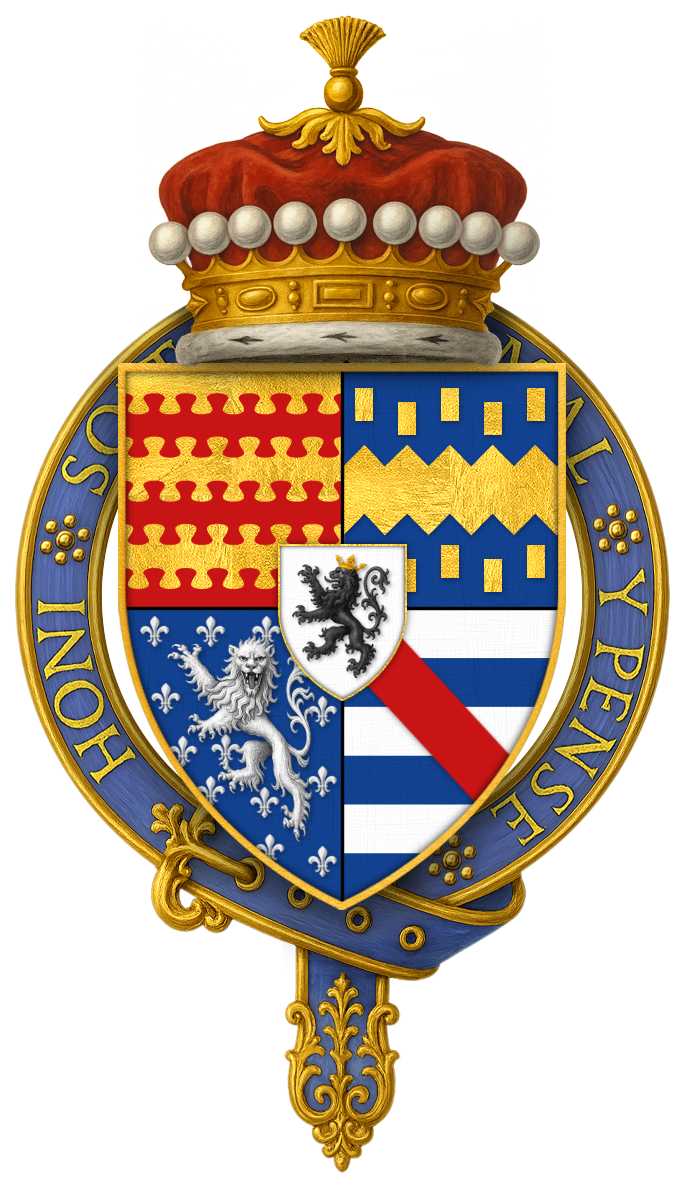
Arms of Sir Francis Lovell, 1st Viscount Lovell, KG

Francis Lovell, 9th Baron Lovell, 6th Baron Holand, later 1st Viscount Lovell, KG (1456 – probably 1487) was an English nobleman who was an ally of King Richard III during the War of the Roses. Sir William Catesby, Sir Richard Ratcliffe and he were among Richard's closest supporters, famously called "the Cat, the Rat and Lovell our dog" in an anti-Ricardian squib. In addition to being an ally, Lovell is described as Richard's best friend.

Lovell continued the Yorkist resistance into the early years of Henry VII's reign, but his fate is unknown after he disappeared following the final defeat of the Yorkists at the Battle of Stoke Field in 1487.

== Early life ==
Francis was the son of John Lovell, 8th Baron Lovel, and Joan Beaumont, daughter of John Beaumont, 1st Viscount Beaumont. When his father died, the probably eight-year-old Francis inherited the titles of Baron Lovel and Baron Holand. He became a ward of Edward IV of England, who gave him into the charge of Richard Neville, 16th Earl of Warwick, where Edward's youngest brother Richard, Duke of Gloucester, also spent some time. It may have been there that the two young men first formed their close association.

By 1466, he was married to Anne FitzHugh, daughter of Henry FitzHugh, 5th Baron FitzHugh. They had a daughter named Agnes and a son whose name is unknown. Neither child seems to have survived past the age of four. FitzHugh had married the Earl of Warwick's sister Alice Neville and supported Warwick's rebellion against Edward IV in 1470. As the pardon issued to Henry, Lord FitzHugh includes Francis Lovell it can be assumed that Francis lived with his father-in-law at this time. When Edward IV had re-established his rule in 1471, he granted the wardship of Francis Lovell, who was still underage, to his sister Elizabeth and her husband John de la Pole, 2nd Duke of Suffolk.

Upon the death of his paternal grandmother Alice Deincourt in 1474 he inherited a large estate, including the lands of the baronies of Deincourt, Grey of Rotherfield, and the feudal barony of Bedale, long a possession of the Stapleton family. The arms of these families all appear on his Garter stall plate in St George's Chapel, and in stained glass windows at Carlton Towers. He was now one of the wealthiest barons in England not holding an Earldom or Dukedom.

== Follower of Richard III ==
Lovell became a follower of his friend, Richard, Duke of Gloucester, to whom he was also linked through their respective marriages: his wife, Anne FitzHugh was the first cousin of Richard's wife Anne Neville. Lovell served under Richard in the expedition to Scotland in 1482, and was knighted by Richard for it, the same year. After the death of Edward IV on 9 April 1483 he became one of his patron's strongest supporters, though he seems not to have taken an active political part in the proceedings at that time. He had been created a viscount on 4 January 1483, and while still Lord Protector Richard made him Chief Butler and constable of Wallingford Castle.

Richard acceded to the throne on 26 June 1483; at his coronation on 6 July 1483, Francis Lovell bore the third sword of state. His wife, Anne, was part of the coronation train of the new queen along with her mother, Lady FitzHugh, and sister, Lady Elizabeth Parr. Lovell was promoted to the office of Lord Chamberlain, replacing the late William Hastings, and was made a Knight of the Garter in 1483. Lovell helped in the suppression of Henry Stafford, 2nd Duke of Buckingham's rebellion (1483).

In July 1484, William Collingbourne, a Tudor agent, tacked up a lampooning poem at St Paul's Cathedral, which mentions Lovell, whose family's heraldic symbol was a silver wolf, among the three aides to King Richard, whose emblem was a white boar:

The Catte, the Ratte and Lovell our dogge
Rulyth all Englande under a hogge.

For this Collingbourne was executed for treason.

The poem was interpolated into Laurence Olivier's film Richard III, a screen adaptation of Shakespeare's play.

== Bosworth and aftermath ==
In June 1485, Lovell was appointed to guard the south coast to prevent the landing of Henry Tudor. However, Henry Tudor landed in Wales near Milford Haven avoiding the stronger defences of the English south coast. While no chronicle account of the battle mentions Lovell, it seems certain that he fought for Richard at the Battle of Bosworth Field (22 August 1485). Two reports written in the immediate aftermath of the battle list him as among the fallen. In fact, he escaped. After the battle, Lovell fled to sanctuary at Colchester and from there escaped the following year to organise a revolt in Yorkshire that attempted to seize Henry VII. After the failure of this plot, Lovell tried seizing Henry VII in York by himself, and is believed to have been behind an attempted assassination of Henry in York. After the failure of both these attempts, he first joined fellow rebels at Furness Fells, and later fled to Margaret of York in Flanders.

As a chief leader of the Yorkist party, Lovell took a prominent part in Lambert Simnel's enterprise. With John de la Pole, Earl of Lincoln, he accompanied the pretender to Ireland and fought for him at the Battle of Stoke Field on 16 June 1487. He was seen escaping from the battle and may have eventually fled to Scotland, where on 19 June 1488 James IV issued a safe conduct to him. There is, however, no indication that Lovell ever arrived or lived in Scotland, and no further information about his fate.

Lovell's wife, Anne Fitzhugh, was granted an annuity of £20 in 1489. She was still alive in 1495; the date of her death is not known.

== Later reports about his death ==
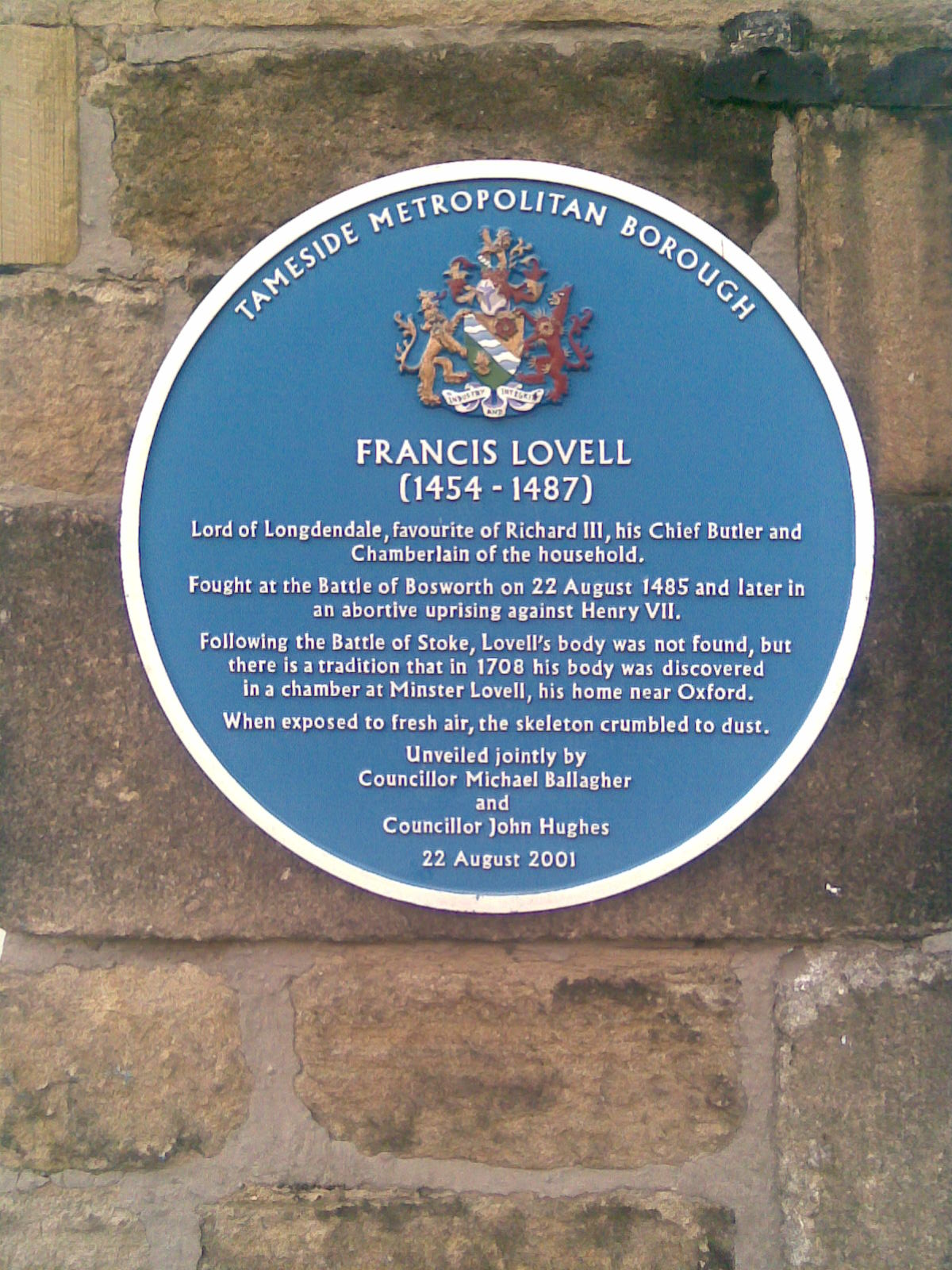
Plaque to Francis Lovell at Mottram in Longdendale, now in Greater Manchester. The date of his death is unknown, and may have been after 1487.

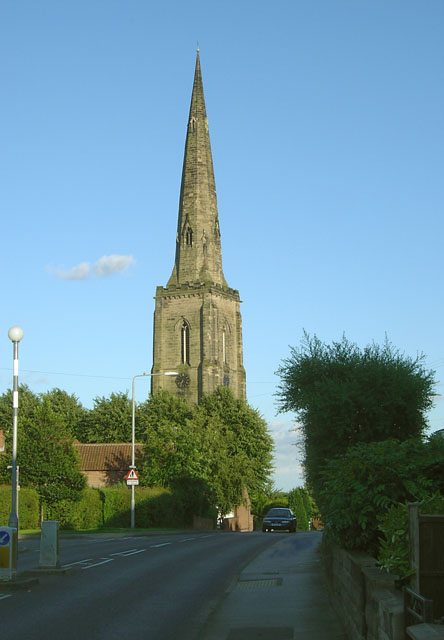
Spire of All Hallows' Church, Gedling

Francis Bacon relates that according to one report he lived long afterward in a cave or vault.

More than 200 years later, in 1708, the skeleton of a man was found in a secret chamber in the family mansion at Minster Lovell in Oxfordshire, and it was supposed that Lovell had hidden himself there and died of starvation. While this story is very picturesque, it seems unlikely to be true. Lovell had hardly spent any time at Minster Lovell, and would not have had a faithful servant there who would hide him for years. Additionally, the manor had been granted to Jasper Tudor, Duke of Bedford, Henry Tudor's uncle, and was therefore hardly an appropriate hiding place for Francis Lovell.

On the Nottinghamshire History website, a reference is made to the Transactions of the Thoroton Society and the Society's visit on 30 June 1903 to All Hallows' Church, Gedling, Nottinghamshire. It notes that there were only three pre-Reformation sepulchral slabs:

The third slab, an alabaster one, lies at the south end of the altar-table. A few lines in black wax constitute the remains of an inscription and effigy of a knight of the 15th century. The late Mr. Lawson Lowe, of Chepstow, said in December, 1882, that when he visited the church in 1865, the date could be made out, and he thought the effigy might be that of a knight who fought at the battle of Stoke, near Newark, in 1487.

Gedling Church and Stoke Bardolph Castle, the ancestral home of Joan Bardolph who was Francis's great-grandmother, lie just a few miles away from the battlefield of Stoke. It is feasible that Francis attempted to escape across the river at the Fiskerton shallows but was either killed or died later of his wounds, his body being buried under the flagstones in the Gedling Church in order to prevent the certain fate of then being 'hung, drawn and quartered'. An argument that a chantry chapel in the church was founded for Francis Lovell, and may have been his burial site, has been published on the church website.

== See also ==
- List of people who disappeared mysteriously (pre-1910)
- Stafford and Lovell rebellion

== Notes ==
Political offices
Preceded by Lord Hastings	Lord Chamberlain; 1483–1485	Succeeded by William Stanley
