= William Catesby =

English politician (1450–1485)

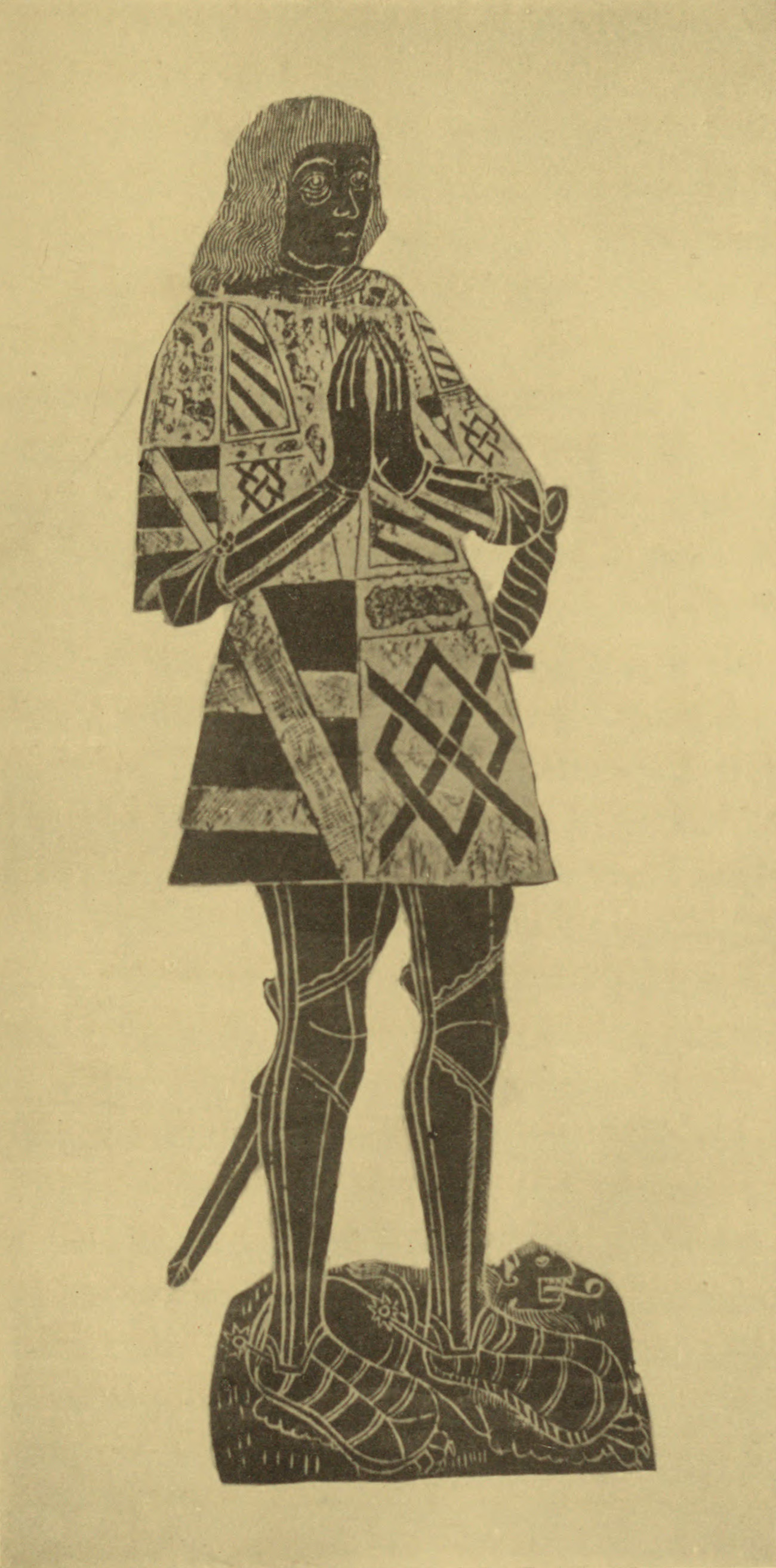
Monumental brass of William Catesby, Ashby St Ledgers Church, Northamptonshire

Arms of Catesby: Argent, two lions passant sable crowned or

William Catesby (1450 – 25 August 1485) was a principal councillor to Richard III of England. He also served as Chancellor of the Exchequer and Speaker of the House of Commons during Richard's reign. The Catesbys’ medieval wealth derived from livestock and the zenith of their political achievement came during his career.

He was born to Sir William Catesby of Ashby St Ledgers, Northamptonshire (died 1478) and Philippa Bishopston, the daughter and heiress of Sir William Bishopston. He trained for law in the Inner Temple and began his career as a lawyer in the service of William, 1st Lord Hastings. He married Margaret, daughter of William La Zouche, 6th Baron Zouche of Harringworth with whom he had three sons. He inherited many estates in the English Midlands upon his father's death and managed additional lands. He was a member of the Council during the reign of Edward V. After Richard was enthroned, Catesby became a King Richard's trusted councillor. He served as Chancellor of the Exchequer, and as Speaker of the English House of Commons during the Parliament of 1484, in which he sat as knight of the shire for Northamptonshire. He also received a substantial grant of land from the king, making him wealthy.

In July 1484, William Collingbourne, a Tudor agent, tacked up a lampooning poem to St. Paul's Cathedral, which mentions Catesby among the three aides to King Richard, whose emblem was a white boar:

The Catte, the Ratte and Lovell our dogge rulyth all Englande under a hogge.

(The dog here refers to Lovell's heraldic symbol, a wolf.) The poem was interpolated into Laurence Olivier's film Richard III, a screen adaptation of William Shakespeare's play. Collingbourne was hanged, drawn and quartered for this and other alleged treasonable activities.

William Catesby was one of the two councillors (the other being Richard Ratcliffe) who are reputed to have told the king that marrying Elizabeth of York would cause rebellions in the north. He fought alongside Richard at the Battle of Bosworth Field and was captured. Alone of those of importance, he was executed three days later at Leicester. The suggestion that he might have made a deal with the Stanleys before the battle comes from his will when he asked them "to pray for my soul as ye have not for my body, as I trusted in you." Christine Carpenter has described Catesby's will—made the night before he died—as expressing a "desperate and probably most necessary concern that he should be forgiven in this world and the next", so unpopular had he become.

Henry VII confiscated most of his estates after his death. His son George regained the family seat of Ashby St Ledgers. Robert Catesby, leader of the Gunpowder Plot, was a descendant.

== Notes ==
Political offices
Preceded by Richard Fowler	Chancellor of the Exchequer of England; 1483–?1484	Succeeded by John Bourchier
Preceded by John Wood	Speaker of the House of Commons; 1483–1484	Succeeded by Sir Thomas Lovell
