= Macbeth (unfinished film) =

Mid-20th-century unfinished film by Laurence Olivier

A film of Macbeth with Laurence Olivier as director and in the lead role was a project for which Olivier was ultimately unable to gain financing.

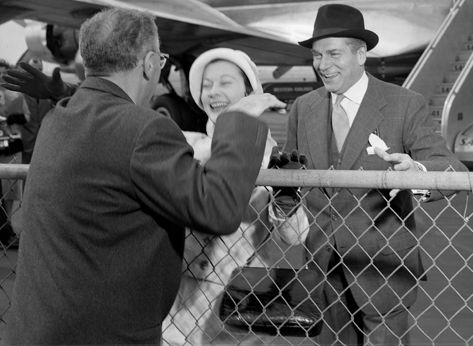
Vivien Leigh and Laurence Olivier in 1957

== Stratford-upon-Avon stage production ==
After making Richard III (1955), Olivier wanted to film Macbeth, with himself in the title role and his wife Vivien Leigh as his Lady. The Oliviers had performed together in the two roles on stage in a production by John Gielgud at Stratford first performed during June 1955. Terence Rattigan described his performance as definitive and Kenneth Tynan wrote that Olivier was "touched with greatness" on opening night. The response to Leigh as Lady Macbeth was more mixed. Both Tynan and Peter Hall were unimpressed with her interpretation, although Tynan consistently deprecated her stage work. Maxine Audley, who played Lady Macduff, thought Leigh had brilliantly conveyed the character's changes of mood, and that for once the spectator could believe this couple were married. Peggy Ashcroft thought Leigh was the best Lady Macbeth she had ever seen.

== Attempts to gain funding ==
Richard III had failed to make a profit and the death of Sir Alexander Korda in January 1956 had severed an agreement the producer had made with Olivier. Leigh's other commitments had meant that the film could not go into production until 1957, and she was insistent about playing Lady Macbeth. He was not able to obtain financing from other sources.

Olivier had interested Oscar-winning producer Mike Todd in financing the film, but he too died, in 1958. Olivier had found and gained permission to use Scottish locations. Composer William Walton, who had scored Olivier's previous Shakespeare films, had been commissioned for this project, and fruitlessly used his contacts to help find funds. Ultimately, Olivier's hopes of making the film were quashed.

"I tried for nine months when I wanted to make a film out of Macbeth," Olivier said. "I was never a producer in the accepted sense, only in the more artistic sense". Critic Pauline Kael cited Olivier's failure to make a film of what was considered one of his greatest performances, to be emblematic of the perversity of Hollywood.

== Rediscovered scripts ==
In early 2013, it emerged an English lecturer from Exeter University had "discovered" 13 versions of the supposedly-lost screenplay of Macbeth at the British Library, part of a trove of papers bought by the Library from Olivier's family in 1999. "I was going through the catalogues and I pulled up a script and found it was Macbeth," said Jennifer Barnes in January 2013. "I didn't believe it because I knew it wasn't supposed to exist". However, the screenplays had in fact been fully catalogued and accessible at the British Library since shortly after their acquisition.
