= William Carnaby =

English politician

William Carnaby (c. 1595–1645) was an English politician who sat in the House of Commons in 1640. He fought on the Royalist side in the English Civil War.

Carnaby was the son of William Carnaby of Farnham and Langley Northumberland and his wife Mabel Carnaby, daughter of Cuthbert Carnaby of Halton Tower. He was aged 22 at the visitation of 1615. He was knighted at Welbeck Abbey in August 1619. He came into possession of his mother's property at Halton, and also acquired the estates of Hadston from Robert Brandling.

In 1624 Carnaby was elected member of parliament for Morpeth. He was elected MP for Northumberland in 1628 and sat until 1629 when King Charles decided to rule without parliament for eleven years. He was a close friend of the Cavendish family and managed the estates of the Earl of Northumberland from 1634 to 1638. He was High Sheriff of Northumberland in 1635.

In April 1640, Carnaby was elected member of parliament for Marlborough in the Short Parliament. He was elected MP for Morpeth again for the Long Parliament in November 1640. He raised forces for the King and was accordingly disabled from attending parliament on 26 August 1642. He was Treasurer of the Army and fought in the Northumberland Regiment, commanded by the Marquess of Newcastle at the Battle of Marston Moor. Following defeat in the battle he accompanied the Marquess, the marquess's sons Charles Viscount Mansfield and Henry Lord Cavendish, the marquess's brother Sir Charles Cavendish, Dr. Bramhall Bishop of Londonderry, Lord Falconbridge, Lord Widdrington, the Earl of Elthyne and Lord Cornworth and was conducted by a troop of horse and dragoons from York to Scarborough. They set sail for Hamburg where they arrived on 8 July 1644.

Carnaby married Jane Bindlosse daughter of Sir Robert Bindlosse.

Parliament of England
Preceded by Robert Brandling; Ralph Fetherstonhaugh	Member of Parliament for Morpeth; 1624; With: Sir Thomas Reynell	Succeeded by Sir Thomas Reynell; Sir Anthony Herbert
Preceded by Sir John Fenwick, 1st Baronet; Sir John Delaval	Member of Parliament for Northumberland; 1628–1629; With: Sir John Fenwick, 1st Baronet	Parliament suspended until 1640
Parliament suspended since 1629	Member of Parliament for Marlborough; 1640; With: Francis Baskerville	Succeeded by John Francklyn; Sir Francis Seymour
Preceded by Sir Philip Mainwaring; Thomas Witherings	Member of Parliament for Morpeth; 1640–1642; With: John Fenwick	Succeeded by John Fiennes; George Fenwick
