= Edmund Hungerford =

16th-century English politician

Edmund Hungerford was the member of the Parliament of England for Marlborough for the parliament of 1586.
