= Robert Yard =

Robert Yard (c. 1651 – 26 or 27 April 1705) was the member of the Parliament of England for Marlborough for the parliament of December 1701 to 1702.
