= Henry Bagot =

16th-century English politician

Henry Bagot (c. 1507 – 1536 or later) was the member of the Parliament of England for Marlborough for the parliament of 1529.
