= Thomas Newman (MP) =

Member of the Parliament of England

Thomas Newman was a lawyer and the member of the Parliament of England for Marlborough for the parliaments of 1415, March 1416, and 1423.

He was closely associated with Sir William Sturmy.
