= Edward Stanhope (died 1608) =

English politician

Sir Edward Stanhope LLD

Chancellor of the Diocese of London

Personal details
- Born: c. 1546 Kingston upon Hull, Yorkshire, England
- Died: 16 March 1608 London, England
- Resting place: Old St Paul's Cathedral, City of London, England
- Education: Trinity College, Cambridge

Edward Stanhope (c. 1547 – 1608) was an ecclesiastical lawyer who served as Chancellor of the Diocese of London and as the member of the Parliament of England for Marlborough in the parliaments of 1584 and 1586.
