= Nicholas Tympeneye =

Member of the Parliament of England

Nicholas Tympeneye was the member of the Parliament of England for Marlborough for the parliament of 1406.
