= William Byllyngtre =

Member of the Parliament of England

William Byllyngtre was the member of the Parliament of England for Marlborough for the parliament of May 1413.
