= Thomas Cryps =

14th-century English politician

Thomas Cryps was a tax collector and the member of the Parliament of England for Marlborough for the parliaments of 1385, 1386, and 1399.
