= John Cornwell (artist) =

Australian painter and sculptor (1930–2020)

John Cornwell (1930–2020) was an Australian painter and sculptor. After studies at the National Art School, he began painting professionally in the 1970s, though his best-known work is the bronze statue of Matthew Flinders' ship's cat Trim (cat), which was installed outside the Mitchell Library (Australia) in 1996 by commission of the State Library of New South Wales, after collection "by public subscription by Trim's admirers". His work also features at Rotary Park at Storm Bay (Kiama). In later life he lived in Kiama.

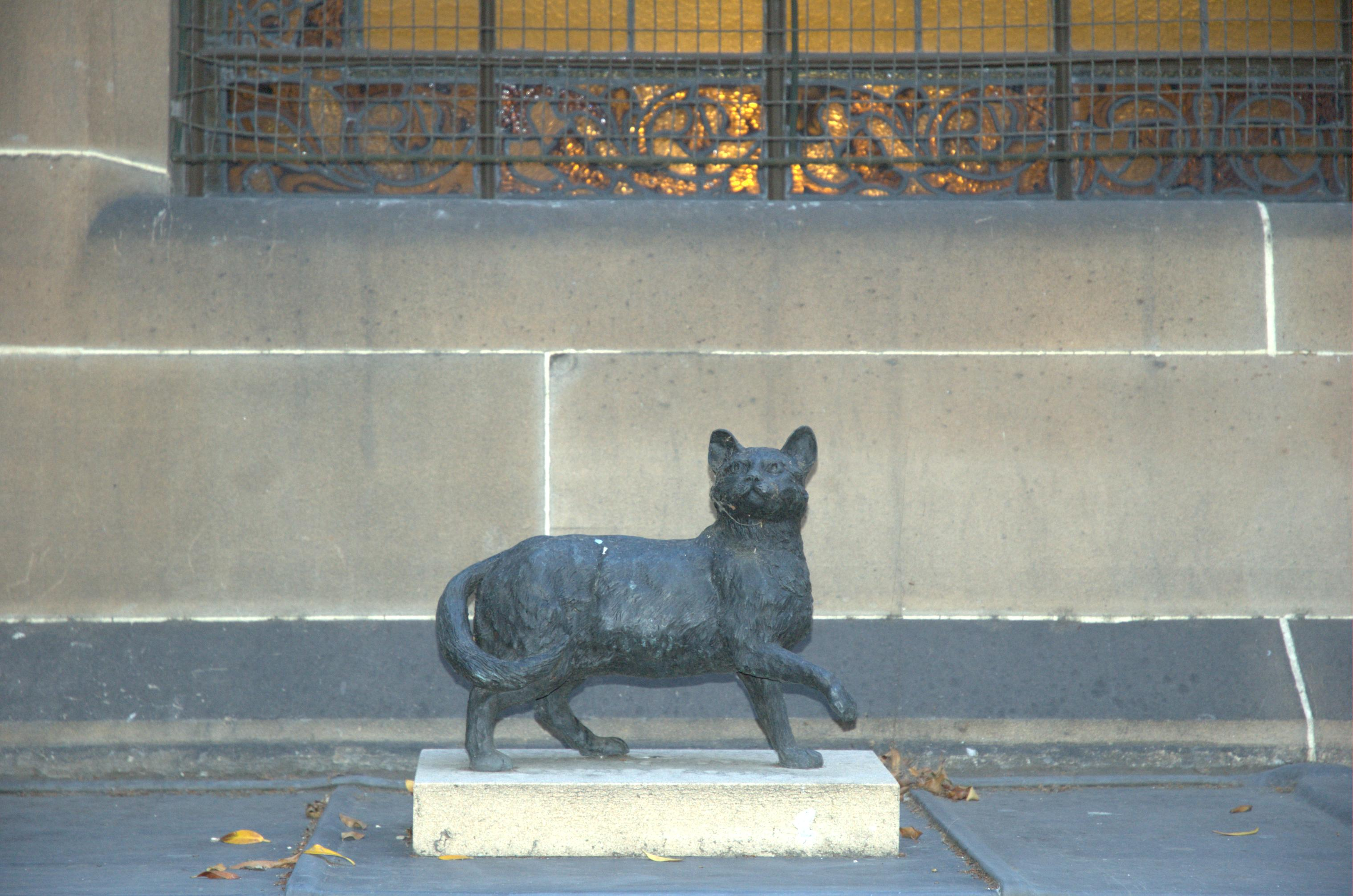
Trim's statue by John Cornwell behind Matthew Flinders's own in Sydney, Australia.
