= Sir Edward Devereux, 1st Baronet of Castle Bromwich =

English politician and baronet

Edward Devereux, 1st Baronet of Castle Bromwich
- Baronet of Castle Bromwich
- Tenure: 25 November 1611 - 1622
- Successor: Walter Devereux, 5th Viscount Hereford
- Born: c. 1544; Castle Bromwich, Warwickshire, England.
- Died: c. 1622; Castle Bromwich, Warwickshire, England
- Residence: Castle Bromwich Hall
- Spouse: Catherine Arden
- Issue: Ambrose Devereux; Anne Devereux-Leighton; Grace Devereux; Walter Devereux, 5th Viscount Hereford; Henry Devereux; Margaret Devereux, Lady Wrottesley; Edward Devereux; William Devereux; Sir George Devereux; Howarda Devereux-Dilke
- Parents: Walter Devereux, 1st Viscount Hereford; Margaret Garneys

Sir Edward Devereux (c. 1544 - c. 1622) was an English politician who sat in the House of Commons, and was an English Baronet.

== Career ==
Edward Devereux was born about 1544, and was the son of Walter Devereux, 1st Viscount Hereford by his second wife, Margaret Garneys, daughter of Robert Garneys of Kenton, Suffolk. His father established him at Castle Bromwich upon his marriage to Catherine Arden of Park Hall, Warwickshire. He inherited little property on the death of his father, but purchased in 1572 from his half-nephew, Walter Devereux, 1st Earl of Essex, the reversion of the Warwickshire manor of Castle Bromwich, which formed part of the jointure of his mother Margaret, the Dowager Viscountess of Hereford. Sir Edward then built Castle Bromwich Hall in 1599, a mansion built in the Jacobean style.

He was the Member of Parliament for Tamworth from 1588 to 1589. He served as Sheriff of Warwickshire from 1593 to 1594.

Following the execution of his great-nephew, Robert Devereux, 2nd Earl of Essex, for treason, Edward Devereux and several of his relatives were reported to Robert Cecil for holding a clandestine meeting at Wolverhampton. However, no charges were ever brought regarding this.

Edward Devereux acquired considerable wealth during his lifetime. For a payment of £1000 to support efforts for suppressing a rebellion in Ireland, King James I of England created him Baronet of Castle Bromwich on 25 November 1611 (10 Jac 1). He was knighted the following year. When his son and heir, Walter Devereux, married his second wife (probably in January 1615), Edward settled on him the Herefordshire manor of Stoke Lacy.

Following Edward’s death, his son Walter engaged in a bitter quarrel over his inheritance with his mother Catherine. The source of their dispute was an agreement made in 1601. As a widow, Catherine was to retain possession of Castle Bromwich during her lifetime. In return, she was to pay her son an annual rent of £40; allow him to occupy a designated suite of rooms in the manor house if he wished; and grant him the right to receive the profits of timber on the estate. These arrangements, which had seemed acceptable when they were made, were now regarded by Walter Devereux as distinctly unattractive. Lady Catherine had already been well provided for, both by her husband Edward and his father, the 1st Viscount Hereford; between them, they had granted her a jointure estate worth £400 per annum. Her lease of Castle Bromwich gave her an additional £120 a year in clear profit. All told, Walter complained, his mother’s landed income was now of a greater yearly value than the lands and tenements he had as heir of his father. Catherine responded to these complaints in February 1623 by accusing her son in Chancery of making Castle Bromwich the subject of secret conveyances, and of refusing to allow her half the interest on loans made by her husband during his lifetime. As Sir Edward had £21,000 out on loan at his death, the sum involved was substantial. Unfortunately for Walter Devereux, the 1601 lease agreement was valid in law, and consequently, his mother Catherine retained Castle Bromwich and most of its contents until her death in 1627.

== Marriage ==
He married Katherine Arden, eldest daughter of Edward Arden, Esquire, of Park Hall, Warwickshire, by his wife, Mary Throckmorton. They had the following issue:

- Ambrose Devereux (born c.1566), died unmarried during the lifetime of his father.
- Anne Devereux (c.1570 - 20 January 1620), who married Robert Leighton of Wattlesborough, Shropshire.
- Grace Devereux (born c.1572)
- Sir Walter Devereux, 5th Viscount Hereford (c.1575 - 1656), succeeded his father.
- Henry Devereux, who married Barbara Smalbroke, daughter of Robert Smalbroke of Yardley, but left no issue.
- Margaret Devereux (c.1575 - 1615), who married Sir Hugh Wrottesley of Wrottesley, Staffordshire.
- Edward Devereux (born c.1576), died unmarried.
- William Devereux (born c.1579), died unmarried.
- Sir George Devereux (c.1581 - 1665) of Sheldon, Warwickshire, who married Blanch Ridge, daughter of Sir John Ridge of Ridge, Shropshire. They had issue: George, Walter, Arden, Edward, William, Samuel, and Robert. His grandson, Price Devereux, would become the 9th Viscount Hereford, upon the failure of the line of his elder brother.
- Howarda Devereux (c.1586 - c.1619), who married Thomas Dilke of Maxstoke, Warwickshire.

== Death ==
Devereux died on 22 September 1622. He was buried at Aston in Warwickshire. His wife, Katherine, followed him in death on 20 November 1627, and was buried at his side.

== General biographical references ==
- Brydges, Egerton. Collins's Peerage of England, Genealogical, Biographical, and Historical in 9 Volumes. (London: Rivington, 1812). Volume 6, Pages 1 to 22
- "DEVEREUX, Sir Walter (1575-?1656), of Blundeston, Suff., Leigh Court, Worcs. and Castle Bromwich, Warws". History of Parliament Online.

Parliament of England
Preceded by Walter Bagot; John Ferrers	Member of Parliament for Tamworth; 1588-1599; With: Robert Wright	Succeeded by John Ferrers; Thomas Smith
Peerage of England
Preceded by New creation	Baronet; 1611–1622	Succeeded by Walter Devereux
