= John Bird (died c. 1445) =

English politician

John Bird (died c. 1445) was the member of the Parliament of England for Marlborough in the parliaments of 1402, May 1413, November 1414, 1415, 1426, 1429, 1435, and 1437.
