= William Alcliff =

15th-century English politician

William Alcliff was the member of the Parliament of England for Marlborough for the parliament of April 1414.
