= Thomas Lechenore =

Member of the Parliament of England

Thomas Lechenore was the member of the Parliament of England for Marlborough for the parliament of 1393.
