= Nicholas Cley =

Member of the Parliament of England

Nicholas Cley was the member of the Parliament of England for Marlborough for the parliament of September 1397.
