= Francis Seymour, 1st Baron Seymour of Trowbridge =

English politician (c. 1590–1664)

The Right Honourable The Lord Seymour of Trowbridge
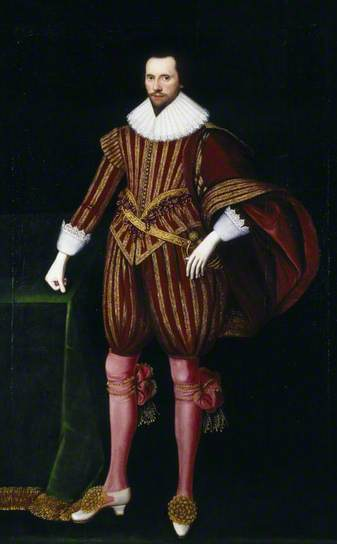
- Francis Seymour, 1st Baron Seymour of Trowbridge, portrait c.1620 style of William Larkin. National Trust, Petworth House, which was rebuilt by his younger grandson Charles Seymour, 6th Duke of Somerset (1662–1748)

Member of the English Parliament for Wiltshire
- In office 1621–1621 Serving with Sir Edward Bayntun
- Preceded by: Sir Thomas Howard; Sir Henry Poole
- Succeeded by: Edward Hungerford; Sir John St John

Member of the English Parliament for Marlborough
- In office 1624–1624 Serving with Richard Digges
- Preceded by: Walter Devereux; Richard Digges
- Succeeded by: Richard Digges; Edward Kyrton

Member of the English Parliament for Wiltshire
- In office 1625–1625 Serving with Sir Henry Ley
- Preceded by: Edward Hungerford; Sir John St John, Bt
- Succeeded by: Sir Henry Poole; Walter Long

Member of the English Parliament for Wiltshire
- In office 1628–1629 Serving with Sir William Button, Bt
- Preceded by: Sir Henry Poole; Walter Long
- Succeeded by: Parliament suspended until 1640

Member of the English Parliament for Wiltshire
- In office 1640–1640 Serving with Philip Lord Herbert
- Preceded by: Parliament suspended since 1629
- Succeeded by: Sir James Thynne; Sir Henry Ludlow

Member of the English Parliament for Marlborough
- In office 1640–1641 Serving with John Francklyn
- Preceded by: Sir William Carnaby; Francis Baskerville
- Succeeded by: John Francklyn; Philip Smith

Personal details
- Born: c. 1590
- Died: 12 July 1664
- Resting place: Bedwyn Magna, Wiltshire, England
- Children: Charles Seymour, 2nd Baron Seymour of Trowbridge
- Parent: Edward Seymour, Lord Beauchamp (father)
- Relatives: William Seymour, 2nd Earl of Hertford (brother)

Francis Seymour, 1st Baron Seymour of Trowbridge (c. 1590 – 12 July 1664), of Marlborough Castle and Savernake Park in Wiltshire, was an English politician who sat in the House of Commons at various times between 1621 and 1641 when he was raised to the peerage as Baron Seymour of Trowbridge. He supported the Royalist cause during the English Civil War.

== Origins ==
Arms of Francis Seymour, 1st Baron Seymour of Trowbridge: Quarterly, 1st and 4th: Or, on a pile gules between six fleurs-de-lys azure three lions of England (special grant to his great-grandfather the 1st Duke of Somerset (died 1552)); 2nd and 3rd: Gules, two wings conjoined in lure or (Seymour). These arms concede the positions of greatest honour, the 1st & 4th quarters, to a special grant of arms to the 1st Duke of Somerset by his nephew King Edward VI, incorporating the fleurs-de-lys (with tinctures reversed) of the Royal arms of France (first quartered by King Edward III) and the lions of the royal arms of Plantagenet

Seymour was the third son of Edward Seymour, Lord Beauchamp (died 1612), eldest son and heir apparent of Edward Seymour, 1st Earl of Hertford (1539–1621) (son of Edward Seymour, 1st Duke of Somerset, Lord Protector of England) whom he pre-deceased, by his wife Honora Rogers, daughter of Sir Richard Rogers of Bryanstone, Dorset. Through his paternal grandmother, he was a great-great-grandson of Mary Tudor, Queen of France and Charles Brandon, 1st Duke of Suffolk, thereby making him a direct descendant of Henry VII.

His elder brother William Seymour, 2nd Earl of Hertford (1587–1660), also a Royalist commander in the Civil War, was created Marquess of Hertford in 1640 by King Charles I and at the Restoration of the Monarchy in 1660 was restored to the Dukedom of Somerset and Barony of Seymour forfeited by their great-grandfather the first Duke, and became the 2nd Duke of Somerset and 2nd Baron Seymour.

== Career ==
In June 1611 he was accused of abetting the escape of his brother William Seymour and his wife Arabella Stuart, but protested his innocence. He was knighted by King James I at Royston on 23 October 1613. In 1612 was settled on him by his grandfather the manor of "Puriton with Downend" in Somerset, formerly one of the many possessions of his great-grandfather the 1st Duke of Somerset.

== Parliamentary career ==
In 1621 Seymour was elected Member of Parliament for Wiltshire. In May he proposed that distinctly harsh penalties should be inflicted on Edward Floyd. He was elected MP for Marlborough in 1624. In that parliament he worked hard to induce a war with Spain, but protested against any extensive military operations in continental Europe and opposed sending an army to the Palatinate on the ground of the "extreme charge". In 1625 he was again elected MP for Wiltshire. On 30 July he proposed that the grant be limited to one subsidy and one-fifteenth, about a tenth of what King Charles I required to meet his engagements. He rejected the overtures which the Duke of Buckingham made to him, and in July he refused to join in the attack on Lord-Keeper Williams because Buckingham was secretly abetting this. In August he attacked the government for conducting a continental war, inveighing against peculation in high places and the sale of offices at court. On these grounds he dissuaded the House from granting supplies. He was re-elected to the new parliament summoned in February 1626, but was made Sheriff of Wiltshire to prevent his sitting. In the following July his name was struck off the commission of the peace. Thenceforth Seymour adhered to Wentworth's policy of moderation. In 1628 he was elected MP for Wiltshire and Marlborough and chose to sit for Wiltshire. On 29 April he joined Noy and Digges when they tried to modify the Commons' Bill of Liberties, and supported Wentworth's Habeas Corpus Bill. He also advocated, with Wentworth against Eliot, a joint-committee of the two Houses on the Petition of Right.

In May 1639 Seymour refused to pay ship-money, and in the following March he was elected without opposition as MP for Wiltshire to the Short Parliament. In this parliament he spoke powerfully against granting any subsidies to the King before receiving any redress of grievances, and apparently compared "our affayres to the bondage of the Israelites in Egypt". In November 1640 he was elected MP for Marlborough to the Long Parliament. He soon began to differ from the popular party, and on 19 February 1641 he was created Baron Seymour of Trowbridge, Wiltshire, a year after his elder brother had been created Marquess of Hertford. In the House of Lords he insisted on voting against Strafford's attainder, although the opposite party denied his competence to vote because he was not a peer when the charges against Strafford were first brought up.

== Civil War ==
In June 1642, Seymour signed the declaration that the king had no intention of war. He followed the King to York, offering to raise twenty horse in his cause, and Parliament accordingly declared him a delinquent. In autumn 1642 he went with his brother, the Marquis of Hertford, into the Westcountry to organise the royalist forces and suppress the parliamentary militia. He crossed the Bristol Channel from Minehead to Glamorganshire on a similar errand in September. In December 1643 he signed the letter of the peers to the council in Scotland, protesting against the invitation sent by parliament to the Scots to invade England. Early in 1645 he was on the commission for the defence and government of Oxford and the adjacent counties. In February he was one of the commissioners appointed to treat at Uxbridge, and in May he was appointed Chancellor of the Duchy of Lancaster. He was at Oxford when it surrendered on 22 June. He was admitted to composition and his fine was fixed at £3,725 by the Committee for Compounding with Delinquents. He attended a council at Hampton Court on 7 October 1647, but took no part in politics during the Commonwealth and Protectorate periods.

== Restoration ==
After the Restoration of the Monarchy Seymour was re-appointed Chancellor of the Duchy of Lancaster, serving from 1660 until 1664.

== Marriages and children ==
Seymour married twice:

- Firstly in 1620 to Frances Prinne (buried 7 September 1626, St Peter and St Paul Church, Marlborough), daughter of Sir Gilbert Prinne of Allington, Wiltshire, by whom he had children including:
  - Charles Seymour, 2nd Baron Seymour of Trowbridge (1621–1665)
  - Frances Seymour, daughter, who married Sir William Ducie.
  - William Seymour, son (baptised 7 September 1626, St Peter and St Paul Church, Marlborough – ?)
- Secondly in 1635 he married Catherine Lee (died 1701), daughter of Sir Robert Lee by his wife Anne Lowe of Billesley, Warwickshire.

== Death and burial ==
Seymour died in 1664 at the age of about 74, and was buried in the chancel of Bedwyn Magna church, the parish church of the Seymours' ancestral seat of Wulfhall, owned by his brother.

== Notes ==
Parliament of England
Preceded by Sir Thomas Howard; Sir Henry Poole	Member of Parliament for Wiltshire; 1621; With: Sir Edward Bayntun	Succeeded by Edward Hungerford; Sir John St John
Preceded by Walter Devereux; Richard Digges	Member of Parliament for Marlborough; 1624; With: Richard Digges	Succeeded by Richard Digges; Edward Kyrton
Preceded by Edward Hungerford; Sir John St John, Bt	Member of Parliament for Wiltshire; 1625; With: Sir Henry Ley	Succeeded by Sir Henry Poole; Walter Long
Preceded by Sir Henry Poole; Walter Long	Member of Parliament for Wiltshire; 1628–1629; With: Sir William Button, Bt	Parliament suspended until 1640
Parliament suspended since 1629	Member of Parliament for Wiltshire; 1640; With: Philip Lord Herbert	Succeeded by Sir James Thynne; Sir Henry Ludlow
Preceded by Sir William Carnaby; Francis Baskerville	Member of Parliament for Marlborough; 1640–1641; With: John Francklyn	Succeeded by John Francklyn; Philip Smith
Political offices
Preceded by The 1st Earl of Hertford	Custos Rotulorum of Wiltshire; 1621 – before 1626	Succeeded by The 2nd Earl of Hertford
Preceded by Edward Reade	High Sheriff of Wiltshire; 1625	Succeeded by Sir Giles Estcourt, Bt
Preceded by The Lord Barrett of Newburgh	— TITULAR — Chancellor of the Duchy of Lancaster; Royal nominee — de jure only 1644–1645	In abeyance No further royal nomination made until 1660
Preceded by Sir Gilbert Gerard; By Parliamentary commission	Chancellor of the Duchy of Lancaster; 1660–1664	Succeeded by Thomas Ingram
Preceded by The Duke of Somerset	Custos Rotulorum of Wiltshire; 1660–1664	Succeeded by The 2nd Lord Seymour of Trowbridge
Peerage of England
New creation	Baron Seymour of Trowbridge; 1641–1664	Succeeded by Charles Seymour
