= William Daniell (died 1604) =

Sixteenth-century English politician

William Daniell (by 1531 – 1604) was the member of the Parliament of England for Marlborough for the parliaments of 1558 and 1559.

He was a justice of the peace for Wiltshire for 1573/74 to 1592.
