= Hugh Gower =

Member of the Parliament of England

Hugh Gower was the member of the Parliament of England for Marlborough for multiple parliament from 1417 to 1422.
