= Thomas Hathaway =

Member of the Parliament of England

Thomas Hathaway (died 1424) was the member of the Parliament of England for Marlborough for the parliaments of April and November 1414.
