= John Ferrers (died 1633) =

English landowner and politician

Sir John Ferrers (1566–1633) was an English landowner and politician who sat in the House of Commons at various times between 1586 and 1611.

Ferrers was the son of Sir Humphrey Ferrers of Tamworth and Walton-on-Trent and his wife Anne or Jane Bradbourne, daughter of Sir Humphrey Bradbourne of Lea, Derbyshire. He matriculated at Trinity College, Oxford on 16 October 1583 aged 17. He was a student of Lincoln's Inn in 1584. In 1586, he was elected Member of Parliament for Tamworth. He was elected MP for Tamworth again in 1593. He was knighted on 7 May 1603. In 1604 he was again elected MP for Tamworth. He succeeded to the estates of his father in 1608 by which time he was a J.P. for Warwickshire. He was Sheriff of Warwickshire from 1614 to 1615.

Ferrers died at the age of about 67 before November when his will was proved.

Ferrers married Dorothy Puckering, daughter of Sir John Puckering, in 1592. They had at least a son and two daughters of whom Frances married Sir John Pakington, 1st Baronet.

Parliament of England
Preceded by John Breton; Clement Fisher	Member of Parliament for Tamworth; 1586; With: Walter Bagot	Succeeded by Sir Edward Devereux, 1st Baronet; Robert Wright
Preceded by Sir Edward Devereux, 1st Baronet; Robert Wright	Member of Parliament for Tamworth; 1593; With: Thomas Smythe	Succeeded by William Temple; George Hyde
Preceded by George Egeock; Robert Burdett	Member of Parliament for Tamworth; 1604–1611; With: Sir Thomas Beaumont	Succeeded by Sir Percival Willoughby; Sir Thomas Roe
