= John Young (MP for Marlborough) =

16th-century English politician

John Young was a tavern keeper and a member of the Parliament of England for Marlborough for the parliament of 1559.
