= Robert Drake (MP) =

14th-century English politician

Robert Drake was the member of the Parliament of England for Marlborough for the parliament of 1395.
