= John Jenewyne =

Member of the Parliament of England

John Jenewyne was the member of the Parliament of England for Marlborough for the parliaments of 1362, October 1382, and 1386.
