= John of Cornwall =

John of Cornwall may refer to:

- John of Cornwall (theologian) (fl. 12th century), English scholar
- John of Cornwall (1232–1232), eldest son of Richard of Cornwall and Isabel Marshal
- John of Cornwall (grammarian) (fl. 14th century), English writer

== See also ==
- John Cornwall (disambiguation)
