= Thomas Heose =

Member of the Parliament of England

Thomas Heose (died after 1414) was the member of the Parliament of England for Marlborough for the parliament of 1406.

He was the mayor of Marlborough in 1402–03.
