= Roger Colly =

16th-century English politician

Roger Colly (by 1532 – c. 1589) was the member of the Parliament of England for Marlborough for the parliament of March 1553.
