= Philip Godwyn =

16th-century English politician

Philip Godwyn (died 1574) was the member of the Parliament of England for Marlborough for the parliament of 1571. He was also mayor of Marlborough.
