= Nicholas Swan =

Member of the Parliament of England

Nicholas Swan was the member of the Parliament of England for Marlborough for the parliaments of March 1416, and 1420.

He is thought to have been a servant of the local landowner, Sir William Sturmy.
