= Thomas Cook (MP for Marlborough) =

Member of the Parliament of England

Thomas Cook (died after 1412) was the member of the Parliament of England for Marlborough for the parliament of 1399.
