= Richard Collingbourne =

Member of the Parliament of England

Richard Collingbourne (died 1418) was the member of the Parliament of England for Marlborough for the parliament of 1402.

He was escheator in 1403 and obtained a royal pardon for any offenses carried out in that role.
