= Thomas Vaughan (died 1483) =

Welsh statesman and diplomat

Sir Thomas Vaughan
- Born: c. 1410
- Died: 25 June 1483 (aged 72/73); Pontefract Castle, England
- Occupation: statesman
- Spouse: Eleanor Arundel
- Parent(s): Robert Vaughan, Margaret Vaughan

Sir Thomas Vaughan (c. 1410 – 25 June 1483) was a Welsh statesman and diplomat, who rose to prominence before and during the Wars of the Roses. He began as an adherent of Jasper Tudor and King Henry VI of England, and was appointed to several offices by Henry. He was nonetheless a Yorkist by inclination, as were many Welshmen of the time. After the Yorkist victory in 1461 he became a loyal and important servant of King Edward IV. In 1483, he was executed by Richard III as part of his seizure of the throne.

== Life ==
Vaughan was the son of Robert and Margaret Vaughan of Monmouth. In 1446 he was appointed to the offices of Steward, Receiver, and Master of the Game in Herefordshire and Ewyas, and Steward, Constable, Porter, and Receiver of Abergavenny. In 1450, he became Master of the Ordnance. He entered Parliament in 1455 as MP for Marlborough.

Despite his early association with Jasper Tudor, Earl of Pembroke, Vaughan was accused of plotting against King Henry VI of England as early as 1459. Somehow he regained the king's favour, and in 1460 was appointed Keeper of Henry VI's "great Wardrobe".

After Henry's defeat at Saint Albans in 1461, Vaughan, along with Philip Malpas and William Hatclyf, sailed for Ireland with Henry's treasury, but were captured by French pirates. Edward IV, surprisingly, ransomed Vaughan from the pirates, for which Vaughan was forever afterwards loyal. Edward soon came to trust Vaughan and placed him in high offices.

Vaughan was appointed Sheriff of Surrey and Sussex for 1464. In 1465 Edward made him Treasurer of the King's Chamber and Master of the King's Jewels.

Edward also sent Vaughan as ambassador to the courts of Burgundy and France. He helped negotiate the marriage of Edward's sister, Margaret to the Duke of Burgundy in 1468.

In 1475, on the same day that Edward's eldest son, the future Edward V, was invested as Prince of Wales, Vaughan was knighted, having acted for some years as Chamberlain to the young prince.

In 1478, he was elected to parliament as knight of the shire for Cornwall.

After Edward IV died in 1483, Vaughan was accompanying Edward V from Ludlow to London when the party was intercepted by the future King Richard III, then Duke of Gloucester. Richard had Vaughan arrested and executed along with Anthony Woodville, 2nd Earl Rivers and tutor for Edward V. Also arrested was Edward V's half brother, Sir Richard Grey, son of Sir John Grey of Groby, the first husband of Elizabeth Woodville. All three were beheaded at Pontefract Castle on 25 June 1483, in West Yorkshire.

Vaughan was the second husband of Eleanor Arundel, widow of Sir Thomas Browne, who had likewise been executed in 1460.

In Shakespeare's Richard III, Vaughan's ghost appears to the King on the eve of the Battle of Bosworth.
