= Richard Wheler =

16th-century English politician

Richard Wheler (died 1614) was the member of the Parliament of England for Great Bedwyn for 1584 and 1586 and for Marlborough for the parliaments of 1589, 1593, and 1597.
