= Edmund Darrell =

16th-century English politician

Edmund Darrell (by 1492 – 1536/40) was an English politician.

He was a member (MP) of the parliament of England for Marlborough in 1529.
