= Thomas Calston =

English politician

Thomas Calston (c. 1361 – 1418), of Littlecote, Wiltshire, was an English landowner and politician. He was a Member (MP) of the Parliament of England for Marlborough in January 1390 and for Wiltshire in 1402 and 1406.

He was the son and heir of Laurence Calston of Littlecote and his wife Felicity Combe. He inherited Littlecote and other Wiltshire property from his father, and further land in Wiltshire, Hampshire and Dorset on the death of his great-uncle Sir Laurence St Martin.

Calston married three times; his second wife (before March 1399) was Joan Childrey, daughter and heir of Thomas Childrey MP, of Childrey, Berkshire; they had a daughter, Elizabeth, who stood to inherit a valuable portion of the Childrey estates.

In later life he lived mostly at Bewley, near Lacock, Wiltshire. He died shortly before September 1418.

== Sources ==
- Kightly, Charles. "CALSTON, Thomas (c.1361–1418), of Littlecote, Wilts". History of Parliament Online.
- Historic England. "Bewley Court (1363958)". National Heritage List for England.
