= Rotary Park =

Urban park in Calgary, Alberta, Canada

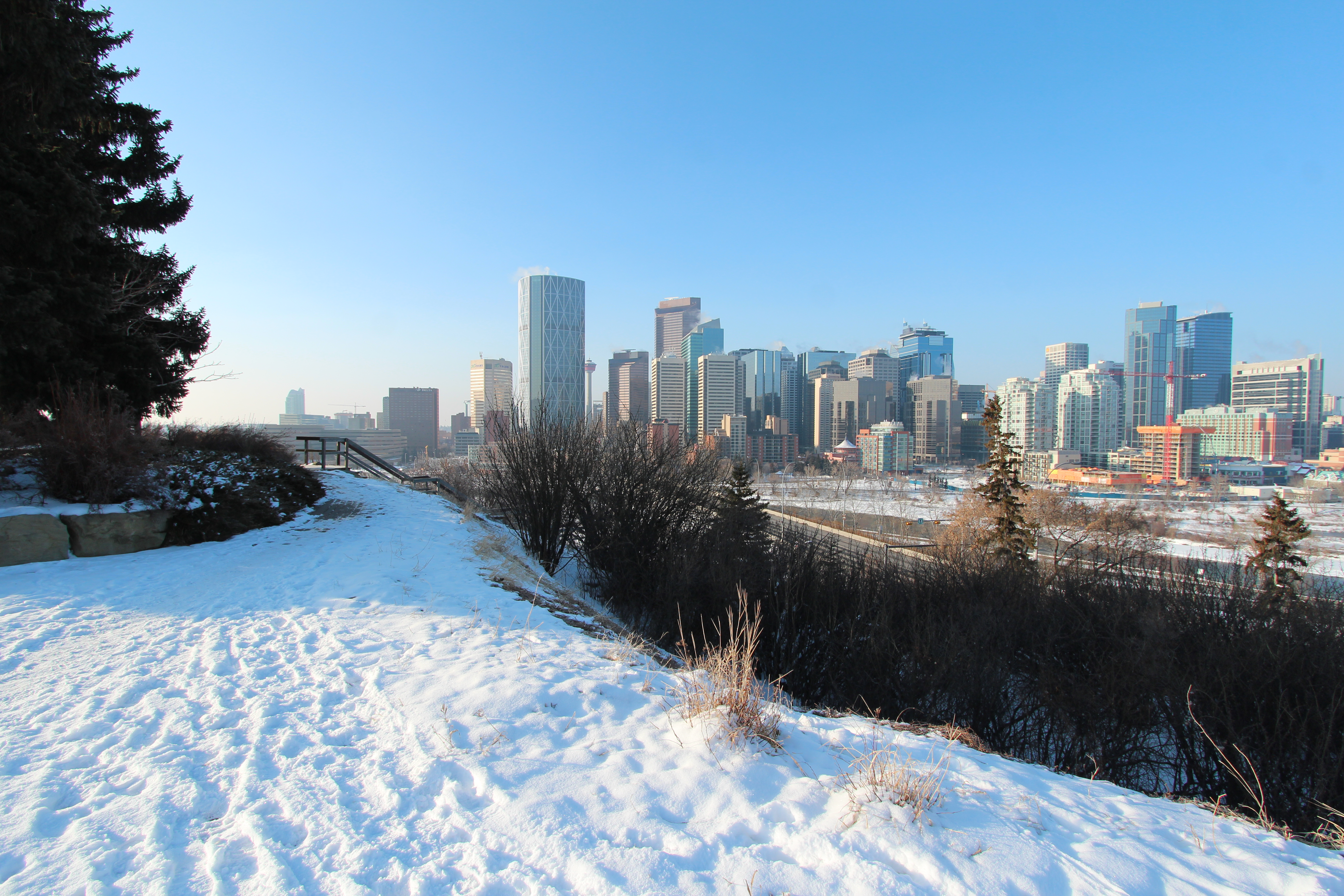
- Downtown Calgary seen from Rotary Park
- Interactive map of Rotary Park
- Type: Urban park
- Location: Calgary, Alberta
- Coordinates: 51°03′24″N 114°03′40″W
- Area: 5.9 hectares (15 acres)
- Operator: City of Calgary

Rotary Park is an urban park in Calgary, Alberta. The park includes an off-leash dog park, a playground, and a splash park. In 2018, one of the original lion statues from the Centre Street Bridge was restored and moved to the southwest corner of the park, overlooking the bridge and downtown.

== Gallery ==
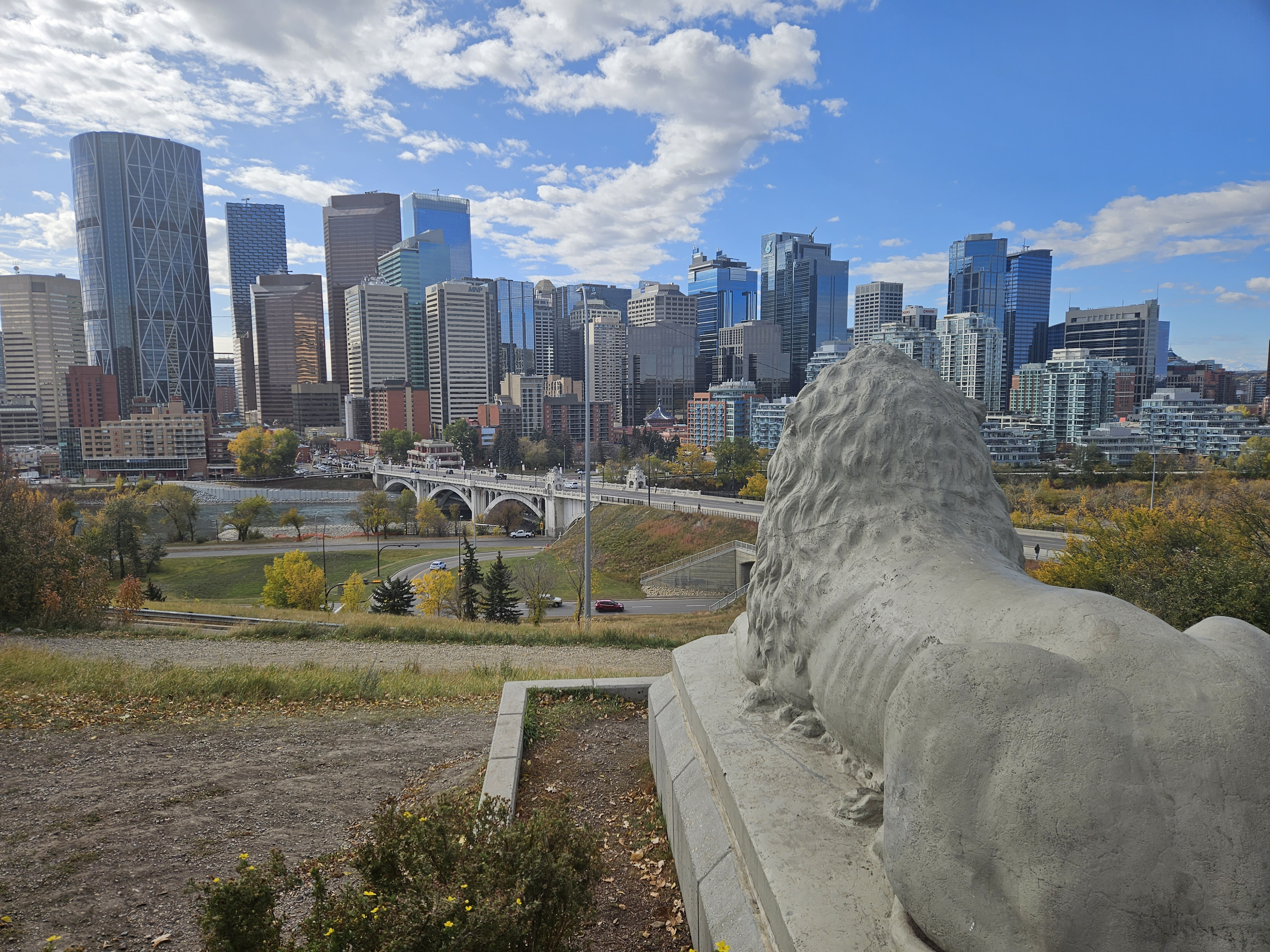
Restored lion statue overlooking Centre Street Bridge
