= Marlborough (constituency) =

Former parliamentary constituency in the United Kingdom

- Former borough constituency for the House of Commons

1295–1885
- Seats: two (1295–1868); one (1868–1885)
- Replaced by: Devizes

Marlborough was a parliamentary borough centred on the town of Marlborough in Wiltshire, which elected two Members of Parliament (MPs) to the House of Commons from 1295 until 1868, and then one member from 1868 until 1885, when the borough was abolished.

== Members of Parliament ==
=== 1295–1640 ===
Parliament	First member	Second member
1386	Thomas Cryps	John Jenewyne
1388 (Feb)	John Curteys	John Wyly
1388 (Sep)	John Curteys	John Wyly
1390 (Jan)	Thomas Calston	Robert Warner
1390 (Nov)		
1391		
1393	John Curteys	Thomas Lechenore
1394	John Curteys	Richard Frys
1395	John Curteys	Robert Drake
1397 (Jan)		
1397 (Sep)	John Canynges	Nicholas Cley
1399	Thomas Cryps	Thomas Cook
1401		
1402	Richard Collingbourne	John Bird
1404 (Jan)		
1404 (Oct)		
1406	Thomas Heose	Nicholas Tympeneye
1407		
1410		
1411		
1413 (Feb)		
1413 (May)	John Bird	William Byllyngtre
1414 (Apr)	Thomas Hathaway	William Alcliffe
1414 (Nov)	Thomas Hathaway	John Bird
1415	John Bird	Thomas Newman
1416 (Mar)	Thomas Newman	Nicholas Swan
1416 (Oct)		
1417	William Hungate	Hugh Gower
1419		
1420	Hugh Gower	Nicholas Swan
1421 (May)	Hugh Gower	Laurence Fitton
1421 (Dec)	Hugh Gower	John Giles
1455	Thomas Vaughan	
1510–1523	No names known	
1529	Edmund Darrell	Henry Bagot
1536	?	
1539	?John Berwick	?John Thynne
1542	?William Barnes	?John Thynne
1545	John Thynne	Andrew Baynton
1547	Humphrey Moseley	Thomas Smith
1553 (Mar)	William Button	Roger Colly
1553 (Oct)	Robert Weare alias Brown	Robert Bithway
1554 (Apr)	Owen Gwyn	Thomas Tyndale
1554 (Nov)	Peter Taylor alias Perce	John Broke
1555	Andrew Baynton	Gabriel Pleydell
1558	William Daniell	William Fleetwood
1559	William Daniell	John Young
1562–3	Michael Blount	Leonard Dannett
1571	John Cornwall	Philip Godwyn
1572	Nicholas St John	John Stanhope
1584	Henry Ughtred	Edward Stanhope
1586	Edward Stanhope	Edmund Hungerford
1588	Richard Wheler	John Cornwall
1593	Richard Wheler	Anthony Hungerford
1597	Richard Digges	Richard Wheler
1601	Richard Digges	Lawrence Hyde
1604–1611	Lawrence Hyde	Richard Digges
1614	Richard Digges	Sir Francis Popham
1621	William Seymour, Lord Beauchamp, ennobled 1621 and replaced by Walter Devereux	Richard Digges
1624	Sir Francis Seymour	Richard Digges
1625	Richard Digges	Edward Kyrton
1626	Richard Digges	Edward Kyrton
1628	Richard Digges	Henry Piercy
1629–1640	No Parliaments summoned	

=== 1640–1868 ===
Year	First member	First party	Second member	Second party
March 1640	Sir William Carnaby	Royalist	Francis Baskerville	
November 1640	John Francklyn	Parliamentarian	Sir Francis Seymour	Royalist
1641	John Francklyn	Parliamentarian	Philip Smith	Parliamentarian
1645	Charles Fleetwood		Philip Smith	Parliamentarian
1653	Marlborough was unrepresented in the Barebones Parliament			
1654	Charles Fleetwood		Marlborough had only one seat in the First and Second Parliaments of the Protectorate	
1656	Jerome Sankey		Marlborough had only one seat in the First and Second Parliaments of the Protectorate	
January 1659	Thomas Grove		James Hayes	
May 1659	Charles Fleetwood		Philip Smith	
April 1660	Henry Hungerford		Jeffrey Daniel	
1661	Lord John Seymour		Jeffrey Daniel	
1673	Sir John Elwes		Jeffrey Daniel	
February 1679	Thomas Bennet		Edward Goddard	
August 1679	Thomas Bennet		Lord Bruce	
1685	Sir John Ernle		Sir George Willoughby	
January 1695	Sir John Ernle		Thomas Bennet	
November 1695	William Daniell		Thomas Bennet	
1698	The Earl of Ranelagh		William Grinfield	
January 1701	The Earl of Ranelagh		John Jeffreys	
November 1701	Robert Yard		John Jeffreys	
July 1702	Hon. Robert Bruce		John Jeffreys	
November 1702	Hon. Robert Bruce		Edward Jeffreys	
May 1705	Edward Ashe		John Jeffreys	
November 1705	Earl of Hertford		John Jeffreys	
May 1708	Earl of Hertford		Hon. James Bruce	
December 1708	Sir Edward Ernle		Hon. James Bruce	
1710	Lord Bruce		Hon. Robert Bruce	
1712	Richard Jones		Hon. Robert Bruce	
1713	Gabriel Roberts		Hon. Robert Bruce	
1715	Sir William Humphreys		Joshua Ward	
1717	Sir William Humphreys		Gabriel Roberts	
March 1722	Earl of Hertford		Gabriel Roberts	
October 1722	Thomas Gibson		Gabriel Roberts	
1727	Thomas Gibson		Edward Lisle	Tory
1734	Francis Seymour		Edward Lisle	Tory
1737	Francis Seymour		John Crawley	
1741	Sir John Hynde Cotton, 3rd Baronet	Tory	John Crawley	
1747	Sir John Hynde Cotton, 3rd Baronet	Tory	John Talbot	
1752	Sir John Hynde Cotton, 4th Baronet		John Talbot	
1754	Sir John Hynde Cotton, 4th Baronet		Hon. John Ward	
1761	Lord Brudenell		Colonel the Hon. Robert Brudenell	Tory
1762	(Sir) James Long	Tory	Colonel the Hon. Robert Brudenell	Tory
1768	(Sir) James Long	Tory	Hon. James Brudenell	Tory
1780	The Earl of Courtown	Tory	William Woodley	Tory
1784	The Earl of Courtown	Tory	Sir Philip Hales	Tory
1790	The Earl of Courtown	Tory	Major-General the Hon. Thomas Bruce	Tory
1793	Earl of Dalkeith	Tory	Major-General the Hon. Thomas Bruce	Tory
1796	Lord Bruce (replaced on inheriting his father's earldom in April 1814)	Tory	Hon. James Bruce	Tory
1797	Lord Bruce (replaced on inheriting his father's earldom in April 1814)	Tory	Robert Brudenell	Tory
1802	Lord Bruce (replaced on inheriting his father's earldom in April 1814)	Tory	James Henry Leigh	Tory
1806	Lord Bruce (replaced on inheriting his father's earldom in April 1814)	Tory	Earl of Dalkeith	Tory
1807	Lord Bruce (replaced on inheriting his father's earldom in April 1814)	Tory	Viscount Stopford	Tory
1810	Lord Bruce (replaced on inheriting his father's earldom in April 1814)	Tory	Edward Stopford	Tory
1814	William Hill	Tory	Edward Stopford	Tory
1818	John Wodehouse	Tory	Lord Brudenell	Tory
1826	Earl Bruce	Tory	Lord Brudenell	Tory
13 March 1829	Thomas Bucknall-Estcourt	Tory	Lord Brudenell	Tory
23 March 1829	Thomas Bucknall-Estcourt	Tory	William John Bankes	Tory
1832	Lord Ernest Bruce	Tory	Henry Bingham Baring	Tory
1834	Lord Ernest Bruce	Conservative	Henry Bingham Baring	Conservative
1847	Lord Ernest Bruce	Peelite	Henry Bingham Baring	Peelite
1859	Lord Ernest Bruce	Liberal	Henry Bingham Baring	Liberal
1868	Representation reduced to one member			

=== 1868–1885 ===
Year	Member	Party
1868	Lord Ernest Bruce	Liberal
1878	Lord Charles Bruce	Liberal
1885	Constituency abolished	

== Election results ==
=== Elections in the 1830s ===
General election 1830: Marlborough
Party	Candidate	Votes	%
Tory	T. H. S. Bucknall-Estcourt	Unopposed	
Tory	William John Bankes	Unopposed	
Whig	Alexander Charles Malet		
Whig	John Mirehouse		
Registered electors		c. 12	
Tory hold			
Tory hold			

- The mayor refused to accept the nominations of Malet and Mirehouse, and Bucknall-Estcourt and Bankes were declared elected unopposed.

General election 1831: Marlborough
Party	Candidate	Votes	%
Tory	T. H. S. Bucknall-Estcourt	Unopposed	
Tory	William John Bankes	Unopposed	
Registered electors		c. 12	
Tory hold			
Tory hold			

General election 1832: Marlborough
Party	Candidate	Votes	%
Tory	Ernest Brudenell-Bruce	135	41.4
Tory	Henry Bingham Baring	118	36.2
Whig	Alexander Charles Malet	73	22.4
Majority		45	13.8
Majority		170	70.8
Registered electors		240	
Tory hold			
Tory hold			

General election 1835: Marlborough
Party	Candidate	Votes	%
Conservative	Ernest Brudenell-Bruce	Unopposed	
Conservative	Henry Bingham Baring	Unopposed	
Registered electors		280	
Conservative hold			
Conservative hold			

General election 1837: Marlborough
Party	Candidate	Votes	%
Conservative	Ernest Brudenell-Bruce	Unopposed	
Conservative	Henry Bingham Baring	Unopposed	
Registered electors		280	
Conservative hold			
Conservative hold			

=== Elections in the 1840s ===
General election 1841: Marlborough
Party	Candidate	Votes	%	±%
Conservative	Henry Bingham Baring	Unopposed		
Conservative	Ernest Brudenell-Bruce	Unopposed		
Registered electors		282		
Conservative hold				
Conservative hold				

Baring was appointed a Lord Commissioner of the Treasury and Bruce was appointed Vice-Chamberlain of the Household, requiring by-elections.

By-election, 14 September 1841: Marlborough
Party	Candidate	Votes	%	±%
Conservative	Henry Bingham Baring	Unopposed		
Conservative	Ernest Brudenell-Bruce	Unopposed		
Conservative hold				
Conservative hold				

General election 1847: Marlborough
Party	Candidate	Votes	%	±%
Peelite	Henry Bingham Baring	Unopposed		
Peelite	Ernest Brudenell-Bruce	Unopposed		
Registered electors		262		
Peelite gain from Conservative				
Peelite gain from Conservative				

=== Elections in the 1850s ===
General election 1852: Marlborough
Party	Candidate	Votes	%	±%
Peelite	Henry Bingham Baring	Unopposed		
Peelite	Ernest Brudenell-Bruce	Unopposed		
Registered electors		271		
Peelite hold				
Peelite hold				

Brudenell-Bruce was appointed Vice-Chamberlain of the Household, requiring a by-election.

By-election, 4 January 1853: Marlborough
Party	Candidate	Votes	%	±%
Peelite	Ernest Brudenell-Bruce	Unopposed		
Peelite hold				

General election 1857: Marlborough
Party	Candidate	Votes	%	±%
Peelite	Ernest Brudenell-Bruce	184	51.1	N/A
Peelite	Henry Bingham Baring	125	34.7	N/A
Conservative	William David Lewis	51	14.2	N/A
Majority		74	20.5	N/A
Turnout		180 (est)	74.4 (est)	N/A
Registered electors		275		
Peelite hold				
Peelite hold				

General election 1859: Marlborough
Party	Candidate	Votes	%	±%
Liberal	Henry Bingham Baring	Unopposed		
Liberal	Ernest Brudenell-Bruce	Unopposed		
Registered electors		281		
Liberal hold				
Liberal hold				

=== Elections in the 1860s ===
General election 1865: Marlborough
Party	Candidate	Votes	%	±%
Liberal	Henry Bingham Baring	Unopposed		
Liberal	Ernest Brudenell-Bruce	Unopposed		
Registered electors		275		
Liberal hold				
Liberal hold				

Seat reduced to one member

General election 1868: Marlborough
Party	Candidate	Votes	%	±%
Liberal	Ernest Brudenell-Bruce	Unopposed		
Registered electors		616		
Liberal hold				

=== Elections in the 1870s ===
General election 1874: Marlborough
Party	Candidate	Votes	%	±%
Liberal	Ernest Brudenell-Bruce	Unopposed		
Registered electors		659		
Liberal hold				

Brudenell-Bruce succeeded to the peerage, becoming Marquess of Ailesbury.

By-election, 31 January 1878: Marlborough
Party	Candidate	Votes	%	±%
Liberal	Charles Bruce	Unopposed		
Liberal hold				

=== Elections in the 1880s ===
General election 1880: Marlborough
Party	Candidate	Votes	%	±%
Liberal	Charles Bruce	333	58.2	N/A
Conservative	Henry Brudenell-Bruce	239	41.8	New
Majority		94	16.4	N/A
Turnout		572	85.6	N/A
Registered electors		668		
Liberal hold		Swing	N/A	

Bruce was appointed Vice-Chamberlain of the Household, requiring a by-election.

By-election, 8 May 1880: Marlborough
Party	Candidate	Votes	%	±%
Liberal	Charles Bruce	Unopposed		
Liberal hold				

== References and sources ==
Sources

- Robert Beatson, A Chronological Register of Both Houses of Parliament (London: Longman, Hurst, Res & Orme, 1807)
- D Brunton & D H Pennington, Members of the Long Parliament (London: George Allen & Unwin, 1954)
- Cobbett's Parliamentary history of England, from the Norman Conquest in 1066 to the year 1803 (London: Thomas Hansard, 1808)
- F W S Craig, British Parliamentary Election Results 1832–1885 (2nd edition, Aldershot: Parliamentary Research Services, 1989)
- J Holladay Philbin, Parliamentary Representation 1832 – England and Wales (New Haven: Yale University Press, 1965)
- Leigh Rayment's Historical List of MPs – Constituencies beginning with "M" (part 1)
