= William Hungate (MP) =

15th-century English politician

William Hungate was the member of the Parliament of England for Marlborough for the parliament of 1417.
