= Castle Bromwich Hall =

Jacobean mansion in Solihull, England

Coordinates: 52.50591°N 1.79222°W

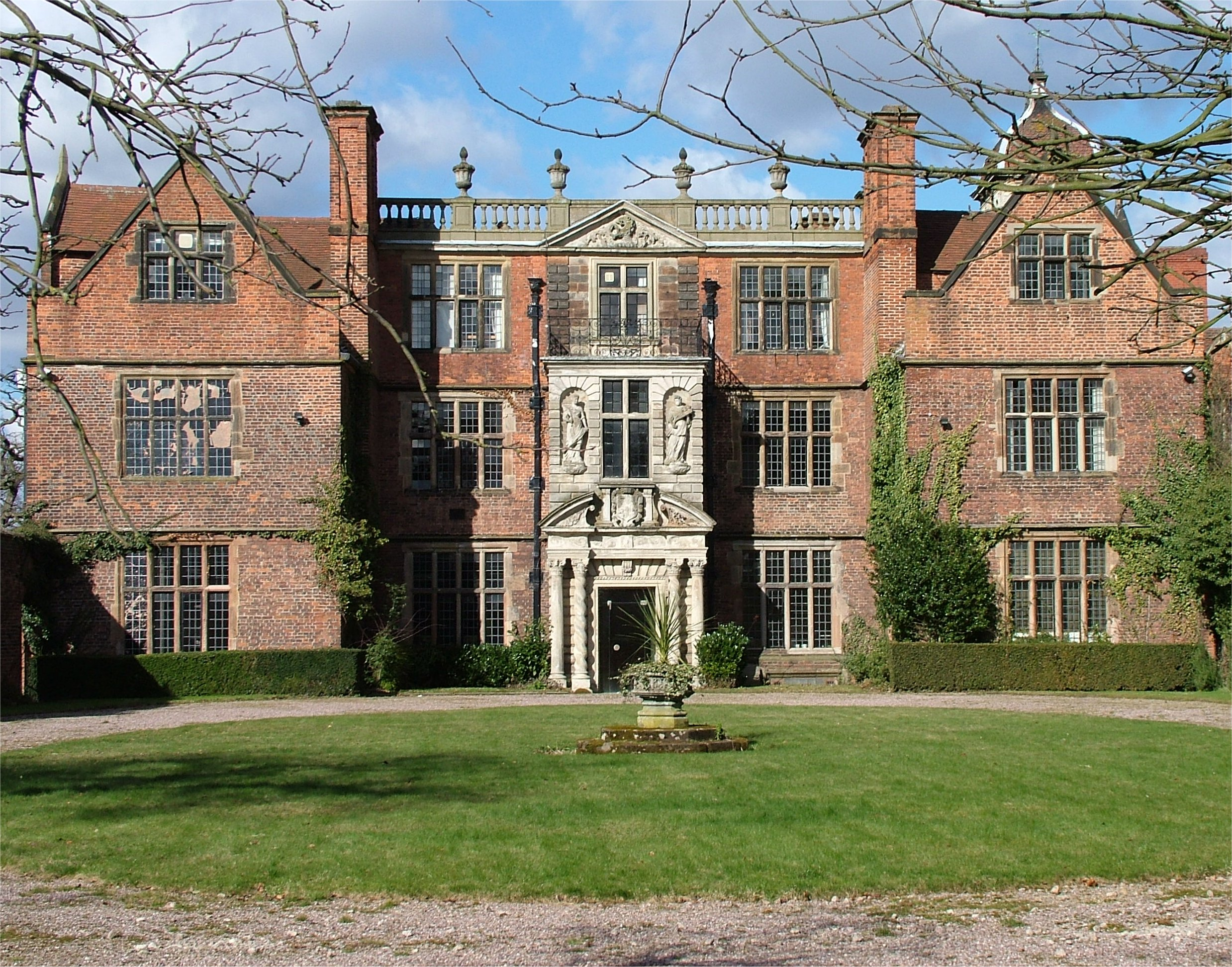

Castle Bromwich Hall is a Jacobean mansion in the Castle Bromwich area of Solihull, England. It is a Grade I listed building.

== History ==
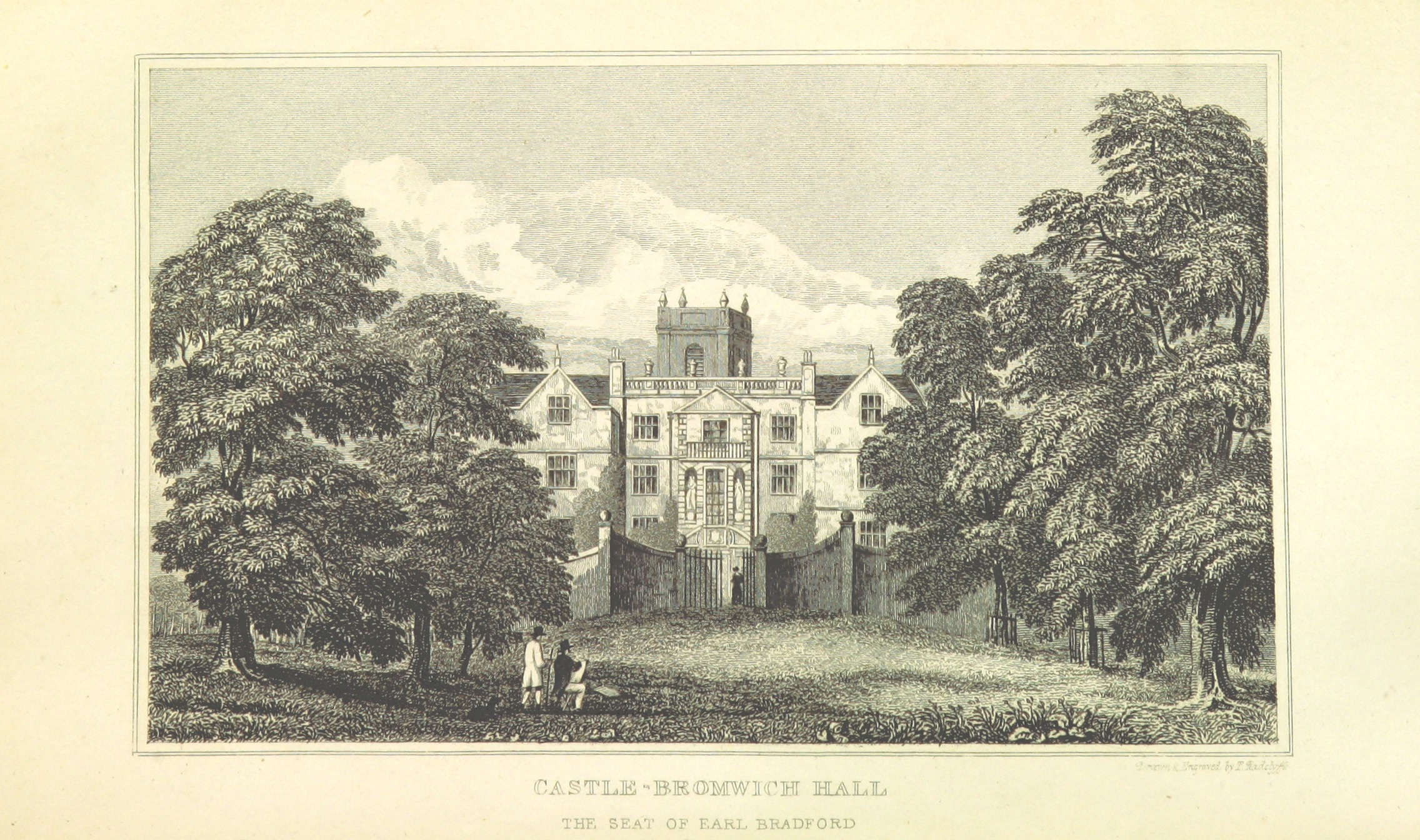
Drawing of the hall, from William Hutton's 1809 book An history of Birmingham

The Hall was built between 1557 and 1585 by Sir Edward Devereux, 1st Baronet of Castle Bromwich, MP for Tamworth in Staffordshire. It was a single-story with a plain entrance. It was then bought by Sir John Bridgeman (son of Orlando Bridgeman, keeper of the Great Seal) in 1657. He extended and improved the property in 1672, adding the second floor and a large front porch. The porch projected out by ten feet from the main building. Above the twisted columns of grey stone of the porch are two figures in niches, called Peace and Plenty. The coat of arms and monogram of Sir John is carved into the stone above the doorway.

The Bridgemans were created Barons Bradford in 1794 and Earls of Bradford in 1813. A marriage brought Weston Park into their possession after which the Castle Bromwich Hall was often rented out.

== Features ==
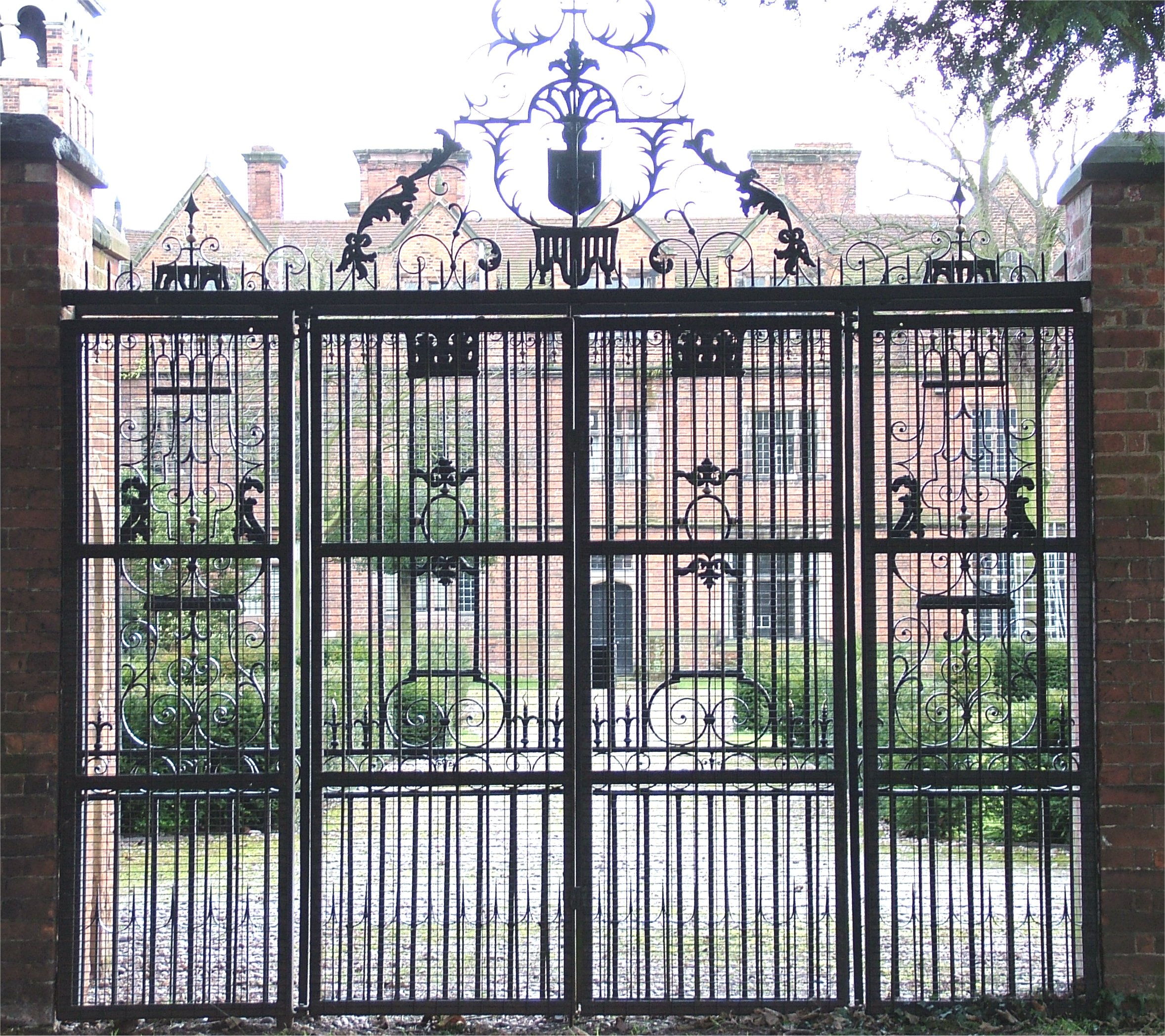
Castle Bromwich Hall viewed through iron gates

The Hall is famous for having twelve windows (one for each Apostle) and four dormers above (one for each Evangelist). The garden door passed through a grapevine which was always trimmed into the form of a cross. The Hall and Long Gallery were paneled with dark oak timber and the dining room was with pitch pine from the United States. The ceilings were adorned with designs of fruits and shells. In 1810 a tapestry of three sections made in Brussels was hung in the drawing room. One of the windows in the Long Gallery had the arms of Sir Edward Devereux and his wife Catherine. There were many secret doorways and hiding holes. Built into the high garden wall was a brick open-air cold water bath dated 1733. The garden maze with 6 ft high holly hedges was a mirror image of that at Hampton Court. The North Garden has double iron gates which lead into the adjacent Church grounds.

== The family ==
The Hall has had many famous visitors including Benjamin Disraeli (while Prime Minister) The Duke of Connaught, The Duke and Duchess of Teck, The Duke and Duchess of York, Prince and Princess Christian, Queen Mary and William Gladstone.

The last family member to live in the Hall until her death in 1935 was Ida Bridgeman, Countess of Bradford. She loved this home and the village, holding the garden fete in the Hall grounds and mingling with the villagers.

== Modern times ==
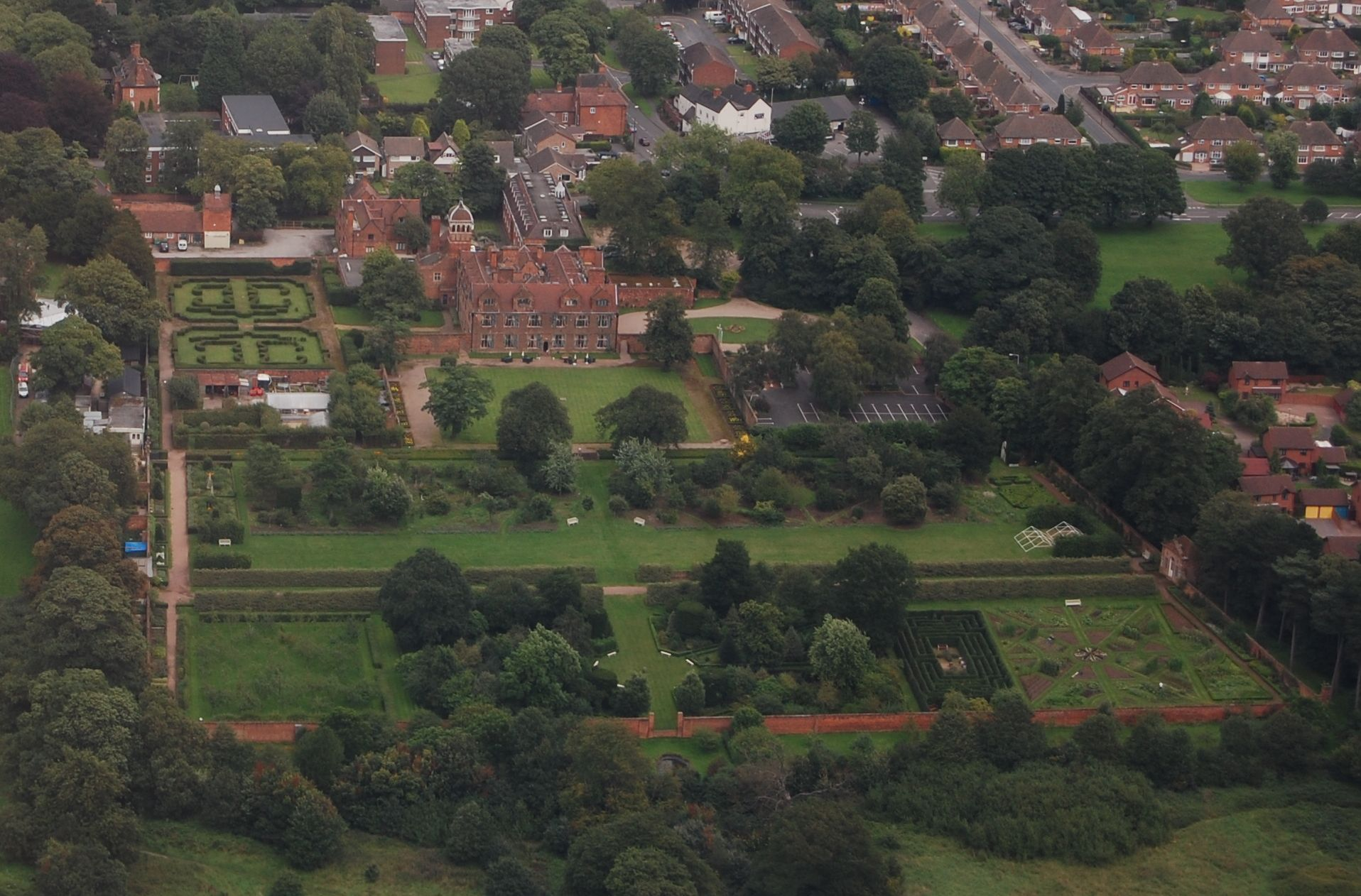
The hall and gardens in August 2012

It was then used for storage during World War II. After the war, it was leased out as a Hall of Residence for graduate, student and craft apprentices of General Electric Company, and then used as building company offices while the outbuildings were used by other small companies.

The Hall was sold in 2007 to Theodore Alexander, a furniture designer and manufacturer who planned to restore the property and open their European showroom there in 2008. In 2009, Castle Bromwich Hall was put up for sale, with the estate agents Knight Frank, with an asking price of £5 million. It was sold for £1.75 million, then underwent extensive restoration and was opened as a hotel in October 2013.

The Hall is usually open to the public for hotel accommodation only. The surrounding Castle Bromwich Hall Gardens are one of the last examples of Formal English Gardens in the country and have been restored by Castle Bromwich Gardens Trust (established 1985), which holds a long lease from the City of Birmingham. These gardens are a popular tourist attraction and are open to the public.

The conservation area of Castle Bromwich is centered on the Hall.
