= John Cornwall (died 1608) =

English politician

John Cornwall (died 1608) was the member of the Parliament of England for Marlborough for the parliaments of 1571 and 1589. He was also mayor of Marlborough on multiple occasions.
