= William Daniell (1665–1698) =

William Daniell (1665–1698) was the member of the Parliament of England for Marlborough for the parliament of 1695 to 25 April 1698.
