= John Curteys (MP for Marlborough) =

Member of the Parliament of England

John Curteys was a carpenter and the member of the Parliament of England for Marlborough for multiple parliaments from February 1388 to 1395.
