= John Lisle (disambiguation) =

John Lisle (1610–1664) was an English lawyer, Parliamentarian politician and Regicide.

John Lisle may also refer to:

- John Lisle (died 1408)
- John Lisle (died 1429)
- Sir John VI Lisle

== See also ==
- John de Lisle (disambiguation)
