= Popham (surname) =

Popham is a surname.

== List of people with the surname ==
- Alexander Popham (1605–1669), English Member of Parliament in the Long Parliament
- Alix Popham (born 1979), Welsh rugby union player
- Arthur E. Popham (1889–1970), British art historian
- Ben Popham (born 2000), Australian Paralympic swimmer
- Edward Popham (1610–1651), General-at-Sea during the English Civil War on the Parliamentarian side
- Edward William Leybourne Popham of Littlecote House, Sheriff of Wiltshire in 1830
- Francis Popham of Littlecote House, Sheriff of Wiltshire in 1612
- Francis Popham of Littlecote House, died Hunstrete House in 1779
- Francis Leybourne Popham of Littlecote House, Sheriff of Wiltshire in 1853
- George Popham (1550–1608), pioneering colonist in Maine born in Somerset, England
- Home Riggs Popham (1762–1820), British naval officer; inventor of a numeric code for signal flags
- John Popham (military commander) (died 1460s), under Henry V, speaker of the House of Commons under Henry VI
- John Popham (judge) (1531–1607), Speaker of the House of Commons and Lord Chief Justice of England
- Lana Popham (born 1968), Canadian politician in the 39th Parliament of British Columbia
- Mervyn Popham (1927–2000), British archaeologist and prehistorian
- Sir Stephen Popham (English MP) Kt. (1386–1444), High Sheriff of Wiltshire, English MP for Hampshire
- Stephen Popham (1745–1795), member of Parliament of Ireland for Castlebar, made improvements to Chennai, India
- Stuart Popham, British lawyer
- Thurstan de Popham, Sheriff of Hampshire in 1150
- Robert Brooke-Popham (1878–1953), British air chief marshal
