= John Popham =

John Popham may refer to:

- John Popham (died 1402), four times MP for Hampshire
- John Popham (military commander) (c. 1395–c. 1463), English military commander and speaker-elect of the House of Commons
- John Popham (judge) (1531–1607), Speaker of the House of Commons 1580–1583, Attorney General 1581–1592 and Lord Chief Justice of England
- John Popham (MP for Winchester), MP for Winchester in 1714
- John Popham (died 1638), English politician, MP for Bath
