= High Sheriff of Hampshire =

Ceremonial officer of the English county of Hampshire

This is a list of High Sheriffs of Hampshire. This title was often given as High Sheriff of the County of Southampton until 1959.

== List of High Sheriffs ==
=== 11th and 12th centuries ===
- 1070–1096: Hugh de Port
- 1105: Henry de Port (son of Hugh)
- 1129 & 1130: William de Pont de l'Arche
- 1150: Thurstan de Popham
- 1155–1159: Turstin (Turcinus)
- 1161–1169: Richard, son of Turstin
- 1170–1173: Hugo de Gundevill
- 1174–1179: Herudus de Stratoon and Hugo de Gundevill
- 1180–1188: Geoffrey, son of Azon.
- 1189: Ogerus, son of Ogerus
- 1189: Godfrey de Luci
- 1190: John de Rebez
- 1191: Willam Briwerre
- 1192: Ogerus, son of Ogerus
- 1193–1200: Hugo de Bosco

=== 13th century ===
- 1201: Willam Briwerre and Radulph de Bray
- 1202–1203: Geoffrey, son of Peter and William Stokes
- 1204–1207: Roger, son of Ade.
- 1208–1209: Walter Briewer and Alan de Bockland
- 1210: Willam Briwerre
- 1211–1213: Hugh de Neville and Geoffrey Salvaozins
- 1214: William de St John
- 1215: Willam Briwerre and William de St John
- 1216: Sir John Marshal
- 1217–1223: Peter des Roches and William de Schorewell
- 1224–1225: Richard Poore and Bartholemew de Kernes
- 1226–1227: Richard Poore and Gilbert de Staplebrigg
- 1228: Nicholas de Moels and Walter de Ramsey
- 1229–1231: Nicholas de Moels and Henry of Bath
- 1232–1233: Peter des Roches and Roger de Wascelin
- 1234: Henry fitz Nicholas (brother of Ralph fitz Nicholas)
- 1235: Henry fitz Nicholas and Robert de Mara
- 1236–1238: Geoffrey de Lisle
- 1239–1241: Emueus de Sacy
- 1242–1247: Robert Passelewe
- 1248: Robert Passell
- 1249–1254: Henry Facull
- 1255: Henry de Farneleg
- 1256: James le Savage
- 1257–1258: John le Ja. Savage
- 1259: William de Wintershull
- 1260–1261: Reginald FitzPiers and John le Flemer
- 1262: Reginald FitzPiers and Hereward de Marisco
- 1263–1264: John le Botele
- 1265: Gerard de Grue
- 1266–1268: John le Botele
- 1269–1272: William de Wintershull
- 1273: Henry de Shotbroke
- 1274–1277: Job. de Havering
- 1278–1279: William de Braybofe
- 1280–1282: Philip de Foynil
- 1280: Jordan de Kingston
- 1283–1284: Simon de Winton
- 1285–1288: William de Bremschete
- 1289–1290: Ingeramus de Waleys
- 1291–1292: Richard Aston
- 1293–1296: Hugo de Chickenull
- 1297–1300: Thomas de Warblington (died 1317)

=== 14th century ===
- 1301: John de Gerbg.
- 1302–1304: Thomas de Warblington
- 1305–1306: Phil de Foynil
- 1307–1311: Thomas de Warblington
- 1312–1313: James de Norton and John de la Bech
- 1314–1316: John de la Bech
- 1317: Richard Byflett
- 1318: Robert de Norton
- 1319: James de Norton
- 1320: John de Tichburne
- 1323–1337: John de Scures
- 1338: Robert Daundelin
- 1339: Robert de Popeham and Robert Daundelin
- 1340: John de Palton and Thomas de Chisenhall
- 1341: John de Palton
- 1342–1346: Thomas de Apsall
- 1347–1349: Henry Sturmey
- 1350–1353: John de Westminster
- 1354: William de Overton
- 1355: John de Palton
- 1356–1359: Walter de Haywood
- 1360–1364: Thomas de Hampton
- 1365: Nicholas Woodlocke
- 1366–1367: Radulph Thurnbarne
- 1368:Peter Brugg
- 1369–1370: John Botiler
- 1371:Thomas Warner
- 1372: Philip de Popham
- 1373: Laurence de Sto Martino
- 1374: Richard Pauncefort
- 1375: Theob. de Gorges
- 1376: Thomas Boklands
- 1377: Radulph de Norton
- 1378: John Bettesthorne of Bisterne
- 1379: Walter Ramsey
- 1380: William Kingborne
- 1381: Hugh Crane
- 1382: Sir John Sandys of East Cholderton, Sherborne 'Coudray'
- 1383: John Shownes
- 1384: John de la Zouch
- 1385: John Showne
- 1386: Robert Cholmleigh of Marsh Court in King's Somborne
- 1387: John de Uvedale of Wickham, Hants and Titsey Place, Surrey
- 1388: Henry Popham of Popham
- 1389: Sir Nicholas Dabrichecourt of Stratfield Saye House
- 1390: Philip Baynard
- 1391: Robert Cholmleigh of Marsh Court in King's Somborne
- 1392: Robert Dingley of Wolverton and Fittleton, Wilts
- 1393: Robert Attemore of Pamber
- 1394: Sir John Sandys of East Cholderton, Sherborne 'Coudray' (died 1395) and Thomas Warner
- 1396: John Waytes
- 1397–1398: William Audley
- 1399: John de Uvedale of Wickham, Hants and Titsey Place, Surrey

=== 15th century ===
- 1400: John Waterton and John Chamfloure
- 1401: Sir John Berkeley of Beverston Castle
- 1402–1403: Edward Cowdrey of Herriard
- 1404: John Tichbourne
- 1405: Sir John Berkeley of Beverston Castle
- 1406: William Marshall
- 1407: John Uvedale of Wickham
- 1408: William Bramshott of Bramshott
- 1409: Sir Walter Sandys of Sherborne 'Coudray'
- 1410: William Warblington
- 1413: Thomas Chaucer of Ewelme, Oxfordshire
- 1414: John Uvedale of Wickham
- 1415: William Brocas of the Vine
- 1416: Sir Thomas Wykeham of Broughton Castle, Oxfordshire
- 1417: Edward Cowdrey of Herriard
- 1418: William Bremsbeth
- 1419: John Uvedale of Wickham, Hants and Titsey Place, Surrey
- 1420–1421: William Kingborne
- 1422: John Uvedale of Wickham, Hants and Titsey Place, Surrey
- 1423: Sir Walter Sandys of Sherborne 'Coudray'
- 1424: Sir John Boys of Farley Chamberlayne
- 1425: Sir Maurice Bruyn of South Ockendon, Essex
- 1426: John Uvedale of Wickham, Hants and Titsey Place, Surrey
- 1427: Sir Stephen Popham of Popham
- 1428: William Brocas of The Vine
- 1429: Thomas Thame
- 1430: John Seymour
- 1431: Walter Veere
- 1432: John Giffard
- 1433: John Uvedale of Wickham, Hants and Titsey Place, Surrey
- 1434: Robert Dingley of Wolverton
- 1435: William Brocas of the Vine
- 1436: John Seymour
- 1437: William Fauconer
- 1438: Thomas Uvedale
- 1439: Sir John VI Lisle
- 1440: Sir Stephen Popham of Popham
- 1441: John Rogers
- 1442: Thomas Thame
- 1443: Henry Trencard of Dorset
- 1444: Thomas Montgomery
- 1445: Thomas Molegues
- 1446: Henry Brum
- 1447: Thomas Uvedale
- 1448: Robert Fenns
- 1449: Richard Dalingrug
- 1450: Thomas Warbleton
- 1451: Thomas Uvedale
- 1452: Thomas Thame
- 1453: John Seymour
- 1454: John Wallop
- 1455: Maurice Berkeley
- 1456: Ber. Brookes
- 1457: John Paulett
- 1458: Henry Brum
- 1459: John Philpot
- 1461: John Wallop
- 1462–63: John Paulett
- 1464: Sir Thomas Uvedale of Wickham Hants and Titsey Place, Surrey
- 1465: Edward Berkeley
- 1466: Geoffrey Gate
- 1467: Maurice Berkeley
- 1468: John Rogers
- 1469: John Whitehead
- 1470: Richard Darel
- 1471: Maurice Berkeley
- 1472: Edward berkeley
- 1473: John Rogers
- 1474: Charles Bulkley
- 1475: Thomas Troys
- 1476: Edward Berkeley
- 1477: William Berkeley
- 1478: Edward Hargill
- 1479: John Cooke
- 1480: Sir William Uvedale of Wickham Hants and Titsey Place, Surrey
- 1481: Edward Berkeley
- 1482: John Brookes
- 1483: Robert Pointz
- 1484: John Rogers
- 1485: Robert Carr and Edward Berkeley
- 1486: John Cooke
- 1487: Sir William Uvedale of Wickham Hants and Titsey Place, Surrey
- 1488: John Tichborne
- 1489: John Pound
- 1490: Thomas Troys
- 1491: Edward Berkeley
- 1492: John Paulett, jnr
- 1493: Sir William Uvedale of Wickham Hants and Titsey Place, Surrey
- 1494: John Dudley
- 1495: John Giffard
- 1496: John Pounds
- 1497: Thomas Troys
- 1498: William Sands
- 1499: Dau. Owen

=== 16th century ===
- 1500: John Paulett
- 1501: John Philpot
- 1502: Richard Wallop
- 1503: John Waller
- 1504: John Pound
- 1505: John Puterham
- 1506: Robert White
- 1507: Sir John Lisle
- 1508–1509: John Leigh
- 1510: Robert Wallop
- 1511: Richard Sands
- 1512: William Paulet, 1st Marquess of Winchester
- 1513: Sir William Compton
- 1514: Arthur Plantagenet
- 1515: Richard Norton
- 1516: Robert Wallop
- 1517: John Dawtree
- 1518: John Lisley
- 1519: William Paulet, 1st Marquess of Winchester
- 1520: John Kaleway
- 1521: William Frost
- 1522: William Giffard
- 1523: William Paulet, 1st Marquess of Winchester
- 1524: Robert Wallop
- 1525: Peter Philpot
- 1526: Anthont Willoughby
- 1527: Sir Thomas Lisle of Thruxton
- 1528: William Berkeley
- 1529: Richard Andrewes
- 1530: Lionel Morres
- 1531: Sir Thomas Lisle of Thruxton
- 1532: Richard Pexall
- 1533: John Kaleway
- 1534: John Paulet (later Marquess of Winchester)
- 1535: Anthony Winsore
- 1536: Peter Philpot
- 1537: William Berkeley
- 1538: Sir Thomas Lisle of Thruxton
- 1539: John Kingsmill of Sydmonton Court
- 1540: Anthony Winsore
- 1541: Richard Andrews
- 1542: John Kaleway
- 1543: Reginald Williams of Oxfordshire
- 1544: William Wacham
- 1545: Nicholas Lister
- 1546: George Paulett
- 1547: Nicholas Tichborne of Tichborne
- 1548: Francis Dawtree
- 1549: Nicholas Lister
- 1550: Nichlas Pexall
- 1551: John St Lowe
- 1551: Richard Cotton of Bedhampton and Warblington
- 1552: Sir William Kellaway of Rockbourne and John Norton
- 1553: Nicholas Tichborne (son of Nicholas 1547)
- 1554: Sir John Bruyn
- 1555: John of Southwick Whyte
- 1556: John Norton of East Tisted
- 1557: Sir Richard Pexsall
- 1558: Sir Oliver Wallop
- 1559: Thomas Pace
- 1560: William Paulet
- 1560 (Mar–Nov): William Uvedale of Place House, Wickham
- 1561: Sir John Berkeley of Southover
- 1562: George Mills
- 1563: William Kingsmill
- 1564: Richard Norton of Rotherfield in East Tisted
- 1565: Richard Pexall
- 1566: Mil. Bulkley
- 1567: Sir Robert Oxenbridge of Hurstbourne Priors
- 1568: Sir Henry Seymour of Marwell
- 1569: John Worsley
- 1570: Gilbert Wells
- 1571: William Waller
- 1572: William Jepham (Jephson?)
- 1573: Edward White of Southwick Priory
- 1574: Edward Aboroe
- 1575: Richard White
- 1576: Walter Sandys of Timsbury
- 1577: John Thurnburgh
- 1578: Henry Gifford of King's Somborne
- 1579: Benjamin Tichborne of Tichborne
- 1580: James Paget
- 1581: Henry Ughtread
- 1582: Robert White
- 1583: ?Robert (Thomas) Dabridgecourt of Horwoods, Preston Candover
- 1584: William White
- 1585: Thomas West of Testwood in Eling
- 1586: Francis Keilway of Rockbourne
- 1587: William St John of Farley Chamberlayne
- 1588: Richard Norton
- 1589: Edward Goddard
- 1590: Sir Richard Paulet of Herriard and Freefolk, near Whitchurch
- 1591: Sir Walter Sandys of Timsbury
- 1592: John Seymour of Merwell
- 1593: ?Nicholas Mill of Nursling
- 1594: Sir William Uvedale (Udall) of Wickham Hants
- 1595: Robert Oxenbridge
- 1596: Richard Norton
- 1597: Mark Steward of Heckfield
- 1598: John White of Southwick
- 1599: William Wallop of Southampton and Wield

=== 17th century ===
- 1600: Francis Palmes of Lancelevy
- 1601: William Kingsmill
- 1602: Sir Benjamin Tichborne of Tichborne (2nd term)
- 1603: Sir Henry Wallop of Farleigh Wallop (1st term)
- 1604: William Abarrow
- 1605: William Doddington of Breamore House
- 1606: Sir William Oglander
- 1607: Daniel Norton of Southwick Priory
- 1608: John Knight of Chawton
- 1609: Sir Henry Whitehead of Norman Court, West Tytherley
- 1610: Thomas Stukeley
- 1611: Sir William Sandys of Winchester
- 1612: William Kingsmill
- 1613: Sir Richard Norton, Bt of Southwick Park
- 1614: John Paulett
- 1615: Edward Richards
- 1616: Richard Worseley
- 1617: Henry Clarke
- 1618: John Compton
- 1619: Thomas Neele
- 1620: Thomas Lambert
- 1621: George Philpot
- 1622: Stephen Knight of Chawton Park
- 1623: Henry Hook
- 1624: Arthur Wilmot
- 1625: Daniel Norton of Southwick Park
- 1626: Em. Gadder
- 1627: Sir John Mill, 1st Baronet of Newton Bury and Southampton
- 1628: Francis Douse
- 1629: Sir Henry Wallop of Farleigh Wallop (2nd term)
- 1630: Thomas Coteel, jnr of Steventon
- 1631: Sir Robert Payne
- 1632: Thomas Stewkley
- 1633: Edward Hooper
- 1634: William Beonsaw
- 1635: Richard Whitehead of Norman Court
- 1636: John Button of Buckland
- 1637: Sir John Oglander
- 1638: Jac. Hunt
- 1639: Richard Major of Hursley(father-in-law of Richard Cromwell)
- 1640: Sir Hugh Stewkley
- 1641: John Feilder
- 1642: William Kingsmill
- 1643–1645 Sir Humphrey Bennet of Rotherfield Park, East Tisted (Royalist sheriff)
- 1643: Richard Norton of Southwick Priory (Parliamentarian sheriff)
- 1644: Thomas Bettesworth, jnr (Parliamentarian sheriff)
- 1646: Richard Bishop
- 1648: Francis Tillney
- 1649: John Hooke of Bramshott
- 1650: Thomas Bilson
- 1651: John Trott
- 1652: John Bromfield
- 1653: Andrew Henley of Bramshill
- 1654: Bartholemew Smith
- 1655: John Holte
- 1656: John Hildesley of Hinton Admiral, near Christchurch
- 1658: Sir Henry Worsley, 2nd Baronet
- 1659: Crowther (discharged March 1660)
- bef. 1660: John Stewkley
- 1663: Thomas Cole of Liss
- 1664: Francis Rolle of East Tytherley
- 12 November 1665: Thomas Neale, of Warnford
- 7 November 1666: Thomas Jervoise, of Herriard
- 6 November 1667: Sir William Oglander, 1st Baronet
- 15 November 1667: John Richards
- 6 November 1668: Henry Mildmay
- 11 November 1669: John Pollen, of Andover
- 3 November 1670: Edward Clark, of Winton
- 4 November 1670: Roger Barton of Fareham
- 9 November 1671: Edward Clark of Winton
- 1672: William Smith
- 11 November 1672: Leonard Bilson
- 12 November 1673: Francis Tylney
- 5 November 1674: William Payne
- 15 November 1675: Peter Blake
- 10 November 1676: Richard Pile
- 15 November 1677: William Pett
- 23 November 1677: Henry Whithed, of East Dean and Norman Court, West Tytherley
- 14 November 1678: John Cumber
- 23 November 1678: Richard Love
- 27 November 1678: Edward Goodyear
- 13 November 1679: John Cumber
- 1680: George Stanley
- 17 November 1681: Gabriel Whistler
- 1683: Sir William Kingsmill
- 1684: Sir George Browne
- 1685: Sir John Mill, 3rd Baronet
- 1686: Charles Wither of Hall
- 1687: James Zouch
- 1688: Sir Hele Hooke, 2nd Bt
- 1689: Edward Fleming of North Stoneham, near Southampton
- 1690: John Kent of Romsley
- 1691: Isaac Foxcroft
- 1692: George Pitt replaced by John Falkener of Kingsclere
- 1693: John Wallop
- 1694: Anthony Sturt of Heckfield
- 1695: James Hunt of Popham
- 1696: Benjamin Ruddyard
- 1697: Alexander Alcorne
- 1698: William Salmon
- 1699: John Leigh

=== 18th century ===
- 1700: Edward Chute of the Vyne
- 1700: William Salmon
- 1701: John Leigh of Norcott
- 1702: Edward Lisle
- 1703: Benjamin Rudyard
- 1704: Sir John St Barbe, 1st Baronet of Broadlands
- 1705: Sir Dewey Bulkeley of Nether Burgate, in Fordingbridge
- 1706: William Withers
- 1707: John Lewkner
- 1708: Robert Forder
- 1708: Anthony Dawley
- 1709: Thomas Jervoise of Herriard
- 1710: Henry Foxcroft
- 1711: John Harwood of Dean
- 1712: William Russell
- 1713: Thomas Drake
- 1714: Robert Love
- 1715: Sir Thomas Hoby, Bt
- 1716: Walter Godfrey of Lea
- 1717: Henry Knollys of Grove Place, Nursling
- 1718: William Stanley of Polton
- 1719: Joseph Hinxman of Hinton
- 1720: Edward Hooper of Hurncourt
- 1721: Charles Morley of Droxford
- 1722: Henry Stanyford
- 1723: James Venables
- 1724: Sir Richard Mill, Bt. of Woolbeding, near Midhurst, Sussex
- 1725: Anthony Chute of Vine
- 1726: Edward Bathurst of Ewshoss
- 1727: Walter Mitford of Exbury
- 1728: Paulet St John of Farley Chamberlayne and Dogmersfield Park
- 1729: Thomas Hodges
- 1730: Richard Love
- 1731: Charles Cole
- 1732: Richard Hassel
- 1733: Thomas Morgan
- 1734: Richard Jervoise, of Herriard
- 1735: Robert Graham of South Warnborough
- 1737: Norton Powlett jnr. of Rotherfield
- 1738: John Burrard of Lymington
- 1739: Edmond Thomas Williamson of Exton
- 1740: Thomas Missing of Stubbington, in Titchfield
- 1741: Rumney Diggle
- 1742: Thomas Wyndham of Yateley
- 1743: Edward Hooker of Worthy
- 1744: Edward Worsley of Gatcombe, Isle of Wight
- 1745: Joseph Hinxman of North Hilton
- 1746: John Walter of East Tuderly
- 1747: William Rickman of Posbrook
- 1748: Jeremiah Cray
- 1749: William Sloane of South Stoneham
- 1750: Richard Taunton of Ramridge
- 1751: Sir William Gardiner of Rochcourt, Bt
- 1752: Richard New of Alverstoke
- 1753: James Ward, of Crabborne
- 1754: Sir Thomas Heathcote of Hursley
- 1755: John Barnard
- 1756: Bernard Brocas of Beaurepaire
- 1757: John Chute of the Vine
- 1758: Henry Compton, of Bistern
- 1759: Thomas Hall the Younger of Preston Candover
- 1760: William Bennett of Fareham
- 1761: George Paulet, Bt
- 1762: Thomas Gatehouse of Wallop
- 1763: Joseph Portal of Freefolk
- 1764: Sir Thomas Worsley, Bt of Appuldurcombe, Isle of Wight
- 1765: Sir Edward Hulse, 2nd Baronet of Bremer
- 1766: George Charles Garnier of Rookesbury
- 1767: Tristram Huddleston Jervoise, of Herriard
- 1768: Chaloner Ogle of Martyr Worthy
- 1769: Thomas Prior of Kingsclere
- 1770: Framcis Hugonin of Nursted
- 1771: Edward Goddard of East Woodley
- 1772: James Rodney of Alresford
- 1773: Sir Richard Worsley, Bt of Appuldurcombe, Isle of Wight
- 1774: John Fleming of Stoneham Park
- 1775: Goodyer Saint John
- 1776: John Walter of Baddesley
- 1777: Ascanius William Senior of Pylewell House, Lymington
- 1778: Michael Scott of Basing Park
- 1779: Charles Coles of Buriton
- 1780: Thomas Pryor, of Kingsclere
- 1781: Benjamin Smith of Lys
- 1782: William Sherriff of Old Alresford replaced by Sir William Oglander, 5th Baronet
- 1783: William Powlett Powlett of Lainston House and Little Somborne, nr. Winchester
- 1784: Sir John Carter of Portsmouth
- 1785: Sir John Whalley Gardiner, 3rd Baronet of Roche Court
- 1786: Thomas Clarke Jervoise of Idsworth Park
- 1787: Sir Henry St John-Mildmay, 3rd Baronet of Dogmersfield Park and Farley
- 1788: Richard Brickenden of Maltshanger
- 1789: William Harris, of New Alsford
- 1790: George Dacre, jnr
- 1791: Sir Charles Pole, 1st Baronet of Wolverton
- 1792: Thomas Robins of Pilewell
- 1793: Sir George Ivison Tapps, 1st Baronet
- 1794: Henry Portal of Freefolk replaced by Henry Bonham of Petersfield
- 1795: Wither Bramston
- 1796: Henry Maxwell of Ewshot House
- 1797: John Compton, of Minstead
- 1798: Richard Meyler of Crawley House
- 1799: John Norris of Hawley

=== 19th century ===
- 5 February 1800: Nathaniel Middleton, of Shamblehurst
- 11 February 1801: William Garrett, of Leigh House, Havant
- 3 February 1802: Sir Edward Hulse, 3rd Baronet, of Breamore House
- 3 February 1803: William Mills, of Bisterne Manor
- 1 February 1804: Sir Charles Mill, 10th Baronet, of Mottisfont
- 6 February 1805: James Blunt, of Nether Wallop
- 7 February 1806: John Hanbury Beaufoy, of Upton Grey
- 4 February 1807: David Lance, of Chissel
- 3 February 1808: George Hanbury Michell, of Titchfield Lodge
- 6 February 1809: John Blackburn, of Preston Candover
- 31 January 1810: Sir James Whalley-Smythe-Gardiner, 3rd Baronet, of Roche Court
- 8 February 1811: Sir Robert Kingsmill, 2nd Baronet of Sydmonton
- 24 January 1812: Thomas Thistlethwayte, of Southwick
- 10 February 1813: John Hornby, of Hooke
- 4 February 1814: Richard Norris, of Basing Park
- 13 February 1815: Henry Bosanquet, of Clanville Lodge
- 1816: John Morant of Brokenhurst
- 1817: John Willis Fleming
- 1818: Richard Goodlad of Hill Place
- 1819: Henry Compton of Minstead
- 1820: James Scott of Rotherfield Park, near Alton
- 1821: Thomas Deane Shute of Burton House
- 1822: Robert Shedden of Brooklands
- 1823: Edward Knight jnr of Chawton Park
- 1824: Walter Long of Preshaw
- 1825: Henry Peter Delmé of Cams Hall
- 1826: Sir Charles Henry Rich, 2nd Baronet of Shirley and Claxton Abbey
- 1827: George Collins Poore of Wickham
- 1828: William Sloane-Stanley of Paultons, near Romney
- 1829: William Edward Nightingale
- 1829: John Bonham-Carter
- 1830: George Purefoy-Jervoise of Herriard House
- 1831: Sir Henry Tichborne, 8th Baronet, of Tichborne Park
- 1832: Jervoise Clark Jervoise, of Idsworth Park then Sir William Heathcote, 5th Baronet of Hursley, near Winchester
- 1833: Thomas Chamberlayne, of Cranbury Park
- 1834: Samuel Raymond Jarvis, of Fair Oak Park
- 1835: Henry Weyland Powell, of Foxlease
- 1836: Sir Charles Hulse, 4th Baronet, of Breamore
- 1837: Hon. William Henry Ashe à Court-Holmes, of Westover
- 1838: Andrew Robert Drummond, of Cadlands
- 1839: John Mills, of Bistern Ringwood
- 1840: John Meggott Elwes, of Bossington House
- 1841: Horatio Francis Kingsfort Holloway, of Marchwood Lodge
- 1842: George Henry Ward, of Northwood Park
- 1843: William Hughes Hughes, of Ryde
- 1844: John Thomas Waddington, of Twyford Lodge
- 1845: Sir Richard Simeon, 2nd Baronet, of Swainstone
- 1846: John Beardmore, of Uplands
- 1847: Lancelot Archer Burton, of Woodlands Emsworth
- 1848: John Wood, of Theddon Grange
- 1849: William Garnier, of Rookesbury, Wickham
- 1850: Joseph Martineau, of Basing Park
- 1851: William Kingsmill, of Sidmonton Court, Kingsclere
- 1852: Francis Jervoise Ellis Jervoise, of Herriard House
- 1853: John Shelley, of Avington House, near Winchester
- 1854: Jeremiah Robert Ives, of Benthworth Hall, near Alton
- 1855: Hon. Sir Edward Butler, of Harefield, near Southampton
- 1856: James Edward Bradshaw, of Fair Oak Park, near Winchester
- 1857: William Charles Humphrys, of Elm Lodge, Bursledon, near Southampton
- 1858: Thomas Smith, of Droxford, near Bishops Waltham
- 1859: Robert Vaughan Wynne Williams, of Appuldurcombe, in the Isle of Wight
- 1860: William George Craven, of Brambridge House, Winchester was initially appointed, but was replaced by Charles Seely, of Brook House, near Yarmouth, Isle of Wight.
- 1861: William Henry Deverell, of Purbrook Park, near Cosham
- 1862: Sir Henry St John-Mildmay, 5th Baronet, of Dogmersfield Park, Winchfield
- 1863: Melville Portal, of Laverstoke House, Micheldever Station
- 1864: James Winter Scott, of Rutherfield Park, Alton
- 1865: Sir Archibald Keppel MacDonald, 3rd Baronet, of Woolmer Lodge
- 1866: Hon. John Thomas Dutton of Hinton House, near Alresford
- 1867: William Hans Sloane-Stanley of Paultons, near Romsey
- 1868: Sir Edward Hulse, 5th Baronet of Breamore House, near Salisbury
- 1869: John Morant of Brockenhurst Park, near Lymington
- 1870: Thomas Fairbairn of Brambridge House, Otterbourne
- 1871: Henry Compton, of Manor House, Minstead
- 1872: John Brown Willis Fleming of Chilworth House, Southampton
- 1873: Sir William Humphery, Bt, of Penton Lodge, near Andover
- 1874: Sir William Wellesley Knighton, Bt., of Blendworth Lodge, Horndean
- 1875: William Howley Kingsmill, of Sydmonton Court, near Newbury
- 1876: Richard Redfern Goodlad, of Hill Place, Droxford
- 1877: Frederick Gonnerman Dalgety of Lockerley Hall, Stockbridge
- 1878: William Nicholson of Basing Park, Alton
- 1879: John Bonham Carter, of Adhurst St. Mary, Petersfield
- 1880: Henry Woods, of Warnford Park, Bishops Waltham
- 1881: Sir Nelson Rycroft, 4th Baronet, of Kempshott Park, near Basingstoke
- 1882: Thomas Thistlethwayte, of Southwick Park, near Fareham
- 1883: Edgar Atheling Drummond, of Cadland, Fawley, near Southampton
- 1884: Sir John Kelk of Tedworth, Marlborough
- 1885: Adam Kennard, of Crawley Court, near Winchester
- 1886: William Wyndham Portal, of Southington House, Micheldever
- 1887: William Ingham Whitaker of Pylewell Park, Lymington
- 1888: William Wickham of Binsted Wyck, Alton
- 1889: Charles Edward Frederick, 7th Baronet of Shawford House, Winchester
- 1890: John Carpenter Garnier of Rookesbury Park, Wickham, Fareham
- 1891: Sir Frederick Walter Carden, 2nd Baronet
- 1892: Sir Henry Alfred Joseph Doughty Tichborne of Tichborne Park, Alresford
- 1893: Joseph William Baxendale of Hursley Park, Winchester
- 1894: John Postle Heseltine of Walhampton House, Lymington
- 1895: Charles Lethbridge of Sherfield Manor, Basingstoke
- 1896: Lieutenant-Colonel William Woods, of Warnford Park, near Bishops Waltham
- 1897: Godfrey Baring, of Nubia House, West Cowes, Isle of Wight
- 1898: John Bonham Carter, of Adhurst St. Mary, Petersfield
- 1899: Sir Richard Nelson Rycroft, 5th Baronet, of Kempshott Park, Basingstoke

=== 20th century ===
- 1900: Sir George Augustus Eliott Tapps-Gervis-Meyrick, Bt of Beech House, Bransgore
- 1901: John Edward Arthur Willis Fleming of Chilworth Manor, Romsey
- 1902: Herman Le Roy Lewis, of Westbury House, Petersfield
- 1903: Lionel Phillips of Tylney Hall, near Winchfield
- 1904: Major Cecil du Pre Penton Powney, of Brambridge House, near Bishopstoke
- 1905: Captain Frederick John Dalgety, of Lockerley Hall, near Romsey
- 1906: Edward Carter, of East Upton, near Ryde, Isle of Wight
- 1907: Edward John Harry Eden Morant, of Brockenhurst Park, Brockenhurst
- 1908: Sir George Alexander Cooper, Bt., of Hursley Park, near Winchester
- 1909: Henry Nicoll, of Bullington Manor, Barton Stacey, S.O.,
- 1910: William Ingham Whitaker, of Pylewell Park, Lymington
- 1911: James Richard George Hennessy, of Compton Manor, Stockbridge
- 1912: Francis Henry Tristram Jervoise, of Herriard House, Basingstoke
- 1913: Roger Cyril Hans Sloane-Stanley of Paultons, Romsey
- 1914: Eustace Exall Palmer of Drayton House, Sherfield–on-Loddon, Basingstoke
- 1915: Laurence Richard Philipps, of Sydmonton Court, near Newbury
- 1916: Heath Harrison, of Le Court, Greatham, near Liss
- 1917: Robert Henry Davis Mills of Steventon Manor, Basingstoke
- 1918: Francis Richard Hugh Seymour Sutton
- 1919: Alexander Ingham Whitaker of Grayshott Hall, Grayshott, Hindhead, Surrey
- 1920: Herbert Johnson of Marsh Court, Stockbridge
- 1921: William Tattersall Whiteley of Weeke Manor, Winchester
- 1922: Sir Frederick Henry Walter Carden of Stargroves, East Woodhay
- 1923: Maldwin Drummond of Cadland, Fawley
- 1924: Viginti Tertius Thompson of Norton Manor, Sutton Scotney
- 1925: Sir Morgan George Crofton, Baronet
- 1926: Sir Joseph Doughty-Tichborne, 13th Baronet.
- 1927: Lieut.-Col. Sir Gilbert Redvers Heathcote, 8th Baronet., of Bighton Wood, Alresford
- 1928: Sir John Courtown Edward Shelley-Rolls
- 1929: Lieut.-Col. George Philippi of Crawley Court, near Winchester
- 1930: Lieut.-Col. Miles Rafe Ferguson Courage of Sutton Manor, Sutton Scotney, Hants
- 1931: Percy Alfred Leyland Laming of Alresford Place, Old Airesford,
- 1932: Joseph John Crosfield
- 1933: Henry Arden Franklyn
- 1934: Geoffrey Edward Miller Mundy
- 1935: Sir Dymoke White of Southleigh Park, near Havant
- 1936: Jervoise Bolitho Scott of Rotherfield Park, Alton
- 1937: George James Robertson Cooper of Merdon Manor, Hursley
- 1938: Sir Nelson Edward Rycroft, 6th Baronet, of Dummer House, Basingstoke
- 1939: Reginald Nicholson
- 1940: Herbert Aris
- 1941: Roland Dudley
- 1942: Edward Gibson Fleming
- 1943: Sir Strati Ralli
- 1944: Ralph Stawell Dutton of Hinton Ampner House, Bramdean
- 1945: Sir Rowland Arthur Charles Sperling of Knowl Hill, Kingsclere
- 1946: Frank Stanley Faber of The King's House, Lyndhurst
- 1947: Ernest Arthur Hunter Fell of Bighton House, Alresford
- 1948: Thomas Edgar Cyril Hussey of Lithend, Bishop's Waltham
- 1949: Alan Lubbock of Adhurst St Mary, Petersfield
- 1950: William Ingham Whitaker of Pylewell Park, Lymington
- 1951: Major Arthur Francis Clarke-Jervoise
- 1952: Sir Reginald Dorman-Smith of Stodham Park, Liss
- 1953: Sir William Makins, 3rd Baronet of Langton House, Alresford
- 1954: John Morant of Brokenhurst Park, Brockenhurst
- 1955: John Bernard Bruce of Itchen Lodge, Itchen Abbas
- 1956: Augustus Frederick Coryton of the Manor House, Greatham, Liss
- 1957: Richard Henry Courage of Queen's House, Monk Sherborne
- 1958: John Micklethwait Mills of Bisterne Manor, Ringwood
- 1959: Sir Hugh Houston Smiley, 3rd Baronet of Ivalls, Bentworth, Alston
- 1960: Richard Augustus Bagot Phillimore of Shedfield Grange, Shedfield
- 1961: Kenneth Edward Savill of Chilton Manor, Chilton Candover
- 1962: Leith Ingham Tomkins Whitaker, of Land of Nod, Headley Down
- 1963: Sir Francis Spencer Portal, 5th Baronet of Burley Wood, Ashe, near Basingstoke
- 1964: Roger Leigh-Wood of Gaston Grange, Alton
- 1965: Bertram William Jepson Turner of Garlogs, Nether Wallop
- 1966: Major-General Ronald Basil Bowen Bancroft Cooke, of Poland Court, Odiham.
- 1967: Sir Patrick William Donner of Hurstbourne Park, Whitchurch
- 1968: Colonel Leonard George Carpenter-Garnier, of Beverley, Wickham, near Fareham
- 1969: Major David Willis, of Norton Manor, Sutton Scotney, near Winchester
- 1970: John Alwyne Pelly, of Barn Close, Itchen Abbas, near Winchester
- 1971: Frank Worsfold McClenaghan
- 1972: Colin James Balfour
- 1973: Sir Peter Dawnay
- 1974: Nigel Donald Peter Chamberlayne MacDonald
- 1975: Major Charles Henry Liddell of Fullerton Grange, Andover.
- 1976: Captain Michael Patrick Radcliffe Boyle, of Ashe Park, near Basingstoke.
- 1977: Admiral Sir Desmond Parry Dreyer of Brook Cottage, Cheriton, Alresford.
- 1978: Edward Jeremy Westrow Hulse of Breamore House, near Fordingbridge.
- 1979: Major Thomas Edward St. Aubyn, of Tangier House, Wootton St. Lawrence, Basingstoke.
- 1980: Maldwin Andrew Cecil Drummond, of Cadland
- 1981: Lieut-Colonel Sir James Walter Scott, of Rotherfield Park, Alton.
- 1982:Captain Peter Alexander Bence-Trower, of West Meon House, Petersfield
- 1983: Major General Hew Dacres George Butler, of Bury Lodge, Hambledon, near Portsmouth.
- 1984: Major Hugh Lancelot St. Vincent Rose, of Buriton House, Buriton, near Petersfield
- 1985: John Alfred Leavett-Shenley, of The Holt, Upham, Hampshire
- 1986: Captain Fergus Erskine Hughes-Onslow, of Lower Norsebury, Stoke Charity, Winchester.
- 1987: Marion Margaret Wake, of Fairfield House, Hambledon, Portsmouth.
- 1988: Captain Andrew William Murdoch, of Parsonage Farm, Hurstbourne Tarrant, Andover.
- 1989: Captain John Loveys Jervoise, of Herriard House, Basingstoke.
- 1990: Major Charles Rowland Marriott, of Chilton Down, Alresford
- 1991: Roderick Robin Mackenzie of Kingfisher House, Ampfield, Romsey
- 1992: Anthony Seymour Berkeley Portman of Rushmore Farm, Upton, Andover
- 1993: Christopher Nevil Wilson
- 1994: Charles Anthony Palmer-Tomkinson of Dummer Grange, Dummer, near Basingstoke.
- 1995: Commander Sir Miles James Rivett-Carnac, 9th Baronet
- 1996: Mark Hugh Joseph Radcliffe of The Malthouse, Upton, Andover.
- 1997: Lindsay Garrett Fox, Cheriton House, Nr.Alresford.
- 1998: John Julian Lionel George Sheffield
- 1999: Valentine Anthony Lewis Powell, Pudding Farm, Headbourne Worthy, Winchester

=== 21st century ===
- 2000: Major Jeremy Groves
- 2001: Anthony Roderick Chichester Bancroft Cooke of Poland Court, Odiham
- 2002: Colin Keith Murray, The Long House, Hurstbourne Priors, Whitchurch.
- 2003: Frances Evelyn Hoare of Tangier House, Wootton St Lawrence, Basingstoke
- 2004: Sir James Scott
- 2005: Peter Maxwell Herman Andreae
- 2006: Lilian Jane Benson of Little Ann, Andover
- 2007: Sarah Veronica Thorne of Ovington, near Alresford
- 2008: Michael David Colin Craven Campbell of Shalden, Alton.
- 2009: Dr. Clare Virginia Bartlett of East Men, Petersfield
- 2010: Alan Charles Lovell of Bishop's Waltham, Southampton
- 2011: Nigel Guthrie McNair Scott of Old Basing
- 2012: Giles Marshall Hallam Mills of Ringwood
- 2013: Rupert Edward Alexander Younger of Petersfield
- 2014: Major-General James Melville John Balfour of Wintershill Hall, Durley, Southampton
- 2015: Lady (Louisa Caroline) Portal of Burley Wood, Ashe, Basingstoke
- 2016: Thomas Henry Floyd of Shalden, Alton
- 2017: Mary Rachel Montagu-Scott of Brockenhurst
- 2018: Mark Edward Thistlethwayte of Hambledon
- 2019: Catherine Sarah Le May of Upham
- 2020: Reverend Susan Elizabeth Colman of Basingstoke
- 2021: Phillip Rodney Sykes of The White House, Steventon, Basingstoke, Hampshire
- 2022: Lady Edwina Grosvenor of Exbury, Southampton
- 2023: Amelia Sophia Rivière of Winchester
- 2024: Jonathan Charles Whitaker of Hamble
- 2025: Susan Philippa Elton, Winchester
- 2026: William John Maltby, Tadley
