= Richard Wallop =

Richard Wallop may refer to:

- Richard Wallop (judge) (1616–1697), English judge
- Richard Wallop (MP) (died c. 1435), English politician
