= Popham, Hampshire =

Village and parish in Hampshire, England

Coordinates: 51.1896°N 1.2009°W

Popham
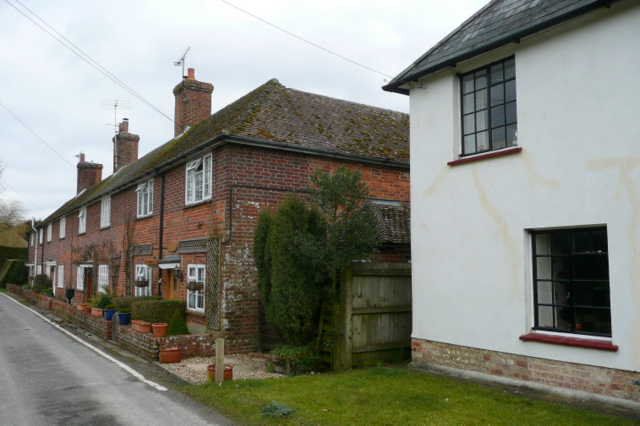

- Location within Hampshire
- District: Basingstoke and Deane
- Shire county: Hampshire
- Region: South East
- Country: England
- Sovereign state: United Kingdom
- Post town: Winchester
- Postcode district: SO21
- Dialling code: 01256
- Police: Hampshire and Isle of Wight
- Fire: Hampshire and Isle of Wight
- Ambulance: South Central
- UK Parliament: Winchester

Popham is a hamlet and civil parish south of Basingstoke, Hampshire, England. According to the Post Office the population of the 2011 Census was included in the civil parish of Dummer. The area was occupied from pre-historic times and was established as a permanent habitation during the Roman occupation of Britain. The manor of Popham was established by the monastery of Winchester as an outlying agricultural grain station. A small church and school were later established, but have long since disappeared. The parish and hamlet were later dissected by the M3 Motorway and A303 trunk road. Although named for Popham, Popham Airfield and the Popham Little Chef restaurant are situated in the neighbouring parish of Steventon.

== Governance ==
The village is a civil parish and part of the Oakley and North Waltham ward of Basingstoke and Deane borough council. The borough council is a Non-metropolitan district of Hampshire County Council.

== Manor ==
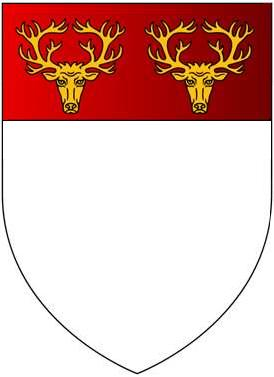
Arms of Popham: Argent, on a chief gules two stag's heads cabossed or

The manor of Popham was held from the 13th century by the family of "de Popham", later "Popham", which took its name from the manor. The descent was as follows:

- Gilbert de Popham (died 1251), who acquired Popham from "Thurstan the Clerk" by unknown means.
- Robert de Popham (1226- ), son and heir, who witnessed a charter to Hyde Abbey in 1277–78. In the late 13th century, the Popham family acquired the manor of Huntworth in Somerset, which became the seat of the most prominent and longer-lived branch of the Popham family, including Sir John Popham (1531–1607), Lord Chief Justice.
- John de Popham (died c. 1316/17), probably Robert's son. He held a moiety of Popham from William de Braiboeuf of Cranborne. In 1305 he was granted free warren in Popham.
- Robert II Popham (floruit 1346), who received seizin of Popham in 1317. He married a certain Alice.
- Sir John Popham (died 1354/59) of Popham, who married Sibyl St Martin, younger sister of Sir Laurence St. Martin, MP, of Wardour, Wiltshire.
- Laurence de Popham, eldest son.
- Henry Popham (c. 1339 – 1417/18), brother & heir. Sheriff of Hampshire and seven times MP for Hampshire. He held part of Popham from Hyde Abbey. Probably son of Robert II. In 1378 and 1401 he received a confirmation of title to his lands at Popham from the Empress Maud and from King Henry II respectively. His younger brother was Sir John Popham (died 1418) of South Charford, Hampshire, four times MP for Hampshire and Sheriff of Hampshire in 1404. Sir John Popham's son, and thus Henry Popham's nephew was John Popham (c. 1395 – c. 1463), elected in 1449 Speaker of the House of Commons, which position he refused on grounds of ill-health. The latter died unmarried without progeny when his heirs became his cousins the four daughters of Sir Stephen Popham (c. 1386 – 1444) of Popham.
- Sir Stephen Popham (1386/92–1444/5), son and heir, received seizin of Popham in 1422/3. Five times MP for Hampshire. Died without male progeny when his four daughters became his co-heiresses.
- Elizabeth Popham, daughter and co-heiress, who in 1464 received as her share of the inheritance the manor of Popham. She married Sir John Wadham (died 1476) of Edge, Branscombe, Devon and Merryfield, Ilton, Somerset.
