= Walter Sandys =

Walter Sandys may refer to:

- Walter Sandys (died 1435), High Sheriff of Hampshire 1410–11 and 1423–24, MP for Hampshire
- Walter Sandys (died 1609), High Sheriff of Hampshire 1576–77 and 1591–92, MP for Stockbridge

== See also ==
- Sandys (surname)
