= St. Alban's Tavern group =

The St. Alban's Tavern group was an informal association of 78 British Members of Parliament who aimed to bring about a reconciliation of William Pitt the Younger and Charles James Fox in a unified Ministry. They were named after the St. Alban's Tavern in Pall Mall, London where the members met from January 1784.

== Background ==
The group were largely composed of 'independent country gentlemen' who held themselves free from party allegiance. On 26 January 1784 the group came to a resolution "to support the party who should in the present distracted moment manifest a disposition to union". Given the weakness of Pitt's government, which was in a minority in the House of Commons, he accepted the group's proposition but insisted that a government must be formed "with principle and honour". Fox spoke through the Duke of Portland, who had been titular Prime Minister during the Fox-North Coalition: the Duke insisted that Pitt had come to power through unconstitutional means, and therefore must first resign before a new Ministry was appointed.

In reality, neither Pitt nor Fox believed the group had any prospect of success, but both felt obliged to treat them with respect. Possibly in ignorance of the personal bitterness between Pitt and Fox, the promoters of reconciliation are described as "well-meaning and naive" by the History of Parliament. The failure of negotiations left the group itself split, with 45 members supporting Pitt and 30 supporting Fox.

== Members of the group ==
The membership of the group was published in the Annual Register for 1784. Analysis in the introductory survey to the History of Parliament 1754-1790 indicates that five of the 78 were from Scottish constituencies, and a large proportion of the members were returned from English counties. The leader was Thomas Grosvenor, MP for Chester, who on 2 February 1784 successfully moved a House of Commons motion which called "for a firm, efficient, extended and united Administration". The members of the group were:

Member	Constituency	First elected
Francis Annesley.	Reading	1774
Sir John Barrington, Bt.	Newtown (Isle of Wight)	1780
Hon. George Cranfield Berkeley	Gloucester	1783
Richard Wilbraham-Bootle.	Chester	1761
Hon. William Henry Bouverie	Salisbury	
Thomas Berney Bramston.	Essex	1779
The Viscount Bulkeley	Anglesey	1774
John Buller.	West Looe	1768
Sir George Cornewall, Bt	Herefordshire	1774
Sir Robert Salusbury Cotton, Bt	Cheshire	1780
John Dawes.	Tregony	1780
Thomas, Baron Dimsdale	Hertford	1780
William Drake, Jr.	Amersham	1768
George Keith Elphinstone	Dunbartonshire	1781
Earl of Euston	Thetford	1782
William Ewer.	Dorchester	1765
Archibald Campbell Fraser	Inverness-shire	1782
Thomas Gilbert.	Lichfield	1763
Ambrose Goddard.	Wiltshire	1772
George Graham.	Kinross-shire	1780
Sir Henry Gough	Bramber	1774
Thomas Grosvenor	Chester	1755
(Sir) Benjamin Hammet	Taunton	1782
Thomas Harley	Herefordshire	1761
E. Hervey, esq.		
Sir Harry Hoghton, Bt	Preston	1768
Arthur Holdsworth	Dartmouth	1780
Filmer Honywood	Kent	1774
Sir Richard Hotham	Southwark	1780
Sir George Howard	Stamford	1761
William Hussey.	Salisbury	1765
Benjamin Keene	Cambridge	1776
Thomas Kemp	Lewes	1780
Richard Payne Knight	Leominster	1780
Sir Robert Lawley, Bt	Warwickshire	1780
Sir William Lemon	Cornwall	1770
James Tylney Long	Devizes	1762
Lieutenant the Hon. James Luttrell	Stockbridge	1775
Hon General Luttrell	Bossiney	1768
William Lygon	Worcestershire	1775
Sir Horatio Mann	Maidstone	1774
Hon. Charles Marsham Bt	Kent	1768
Sir Joseph Mawbey, Bt	Surrey	1761
Sir Roger Mostyn, Bt	Flintshire	1758
John Parry	Caernarvonshire	1780
Henry Peirse (younger)	Northallerton	1774
William Pochin	Leicestershire	1780
Thomas Powys	Northamptonshire	1774
William Praed	St Ives	1774
John Purling	Weymouth and Melcombe Regis	1770
Sir Walter Rawlinson	Queenborough	1774
Abraham Rawlinson	Lancaster	1780
Henry Rawlinson	Liverpool	1780
Sir Matthew White Ridley, Bt	Newcastle-upon-Tyne	1768
John Rolle	Devon	1780
Charles Boughton	Evesham	1780
Thomas Scott	Bridport	1780
Sir George Shuckburgh, Bt	Warwickshire	1780
Humphrey Sibthorp	Boston	1777
John Sinclair	Caithness	1780
Sir Thomas Skipwith	Steyning	1769
William Charles Sloper	St Albans	1780
Robert Smith	Nottingham	1779
Sir Robert Smyth, Bt	Colchester	1774
John Smyth	Pontefract	1783
Walter Spencer Stanhope	Haslemere	1775
Thomas Stanley	Lancashire	1780
John Strutt	Maldon	1774
Hon. John Manners-Sutton	Newark	1783
Clement Taylor	Maidstone	1780
John Tempest	Durham (County)	1762
Robert Thistlethwayte	Hampshire	1780
Beilby Thompson	Thirsk	1768
Sir John Trevelyan, Bt	Somerset	1777
Thomas Whitmore	Bridgnorth	1771
Sir John Borlase Warren	Great Marlow	1774
John Eardley Wilmot	Tiverton	1776
Glyn Wynn	Caernarvon Boroughs	1768
