= John Arnold =

John Arnold may refer to:

== Politicians ==
- John Arnold (Kentucky politician), member of the Kentucky House of Representatives, 1995–2013
- John Arnold (MP for Ipswich) (died 1410), MP for Ipswich, 1388–1399
- John Arnold (MP for Hampshire) (died 1433), MP for Hampshire, 1413
- John Arnold (MP for Monmouthshire) (died 1606), MP for Monmouthshire, 1597
- John Arnold of Monmouthshire (c. 1635–1702), Ultra-Protestant and MP for Monmouth, 1680–1689, 1695 and Southwark, 1689–1695
- John H. Arnold (politician) (1862–1944), American politician; Lieutenant Governor of Ohio, 1915–1917
- John W. Arnold (1842–1900), American politician; Illinois Senate, 1890–1894

== Music ==
- John Arnold (1720–1792), English music editor and composer of psalmodies in the West Gallery style
- John Dent Arnold (1890–1948), American lyricist with composer Harry Baisden of World War I songs
- John Ayldon (1943–2013), English opera singer born John Arnold

== Others ==
- John Arnold (American football) (born 1955), American football player
- John Arnold (bishop) (born 1953), English Catholic bishop
- John Arnold (cinematographer) (1889–1964), American cinematographer
- John Arnold (judge) (1915–2004), British judge
- John Arnold (priest) (born 1933), Anglican dean and author
- John Arnold (watchmaker) (1736–1799), English watchmaker and inventor, with a son named John Roger Arnold (1769–1843)
- John D. Arnold (born 1974), former Enron trader and political activist
- John E. Arnold (1913–1963), American psychologist and engineer
- John H. Arnold (historian) (born 1969), British historian and professor
- John Nelson Arnold (1834–1909), American portrait painter
- Johnny Arnold (1907–1984), English international footballer and test cricketer
- John Arnold, Australian surf entrepreneur, behind Golden Breed
- John Arnold, perpetrator of the murder of Betty Gardner
- John Arnold, a character in the novel Jurassic Park

== See also ==
- Jack Arnold (disambiguation)
- Jonathan Arnold (1741–1793), American statesman and physician from Rhode Island
- Jonathan Earle Arnold (1814–1869), Wisconsin politician
