= Wackland Manor =

Wackland Manor (also Wakelond), is a manor house on the Isle of Wight, situated in the Newchurch parish. It was held in the 13th century under the Lisles of Wootton, but in 1311–12 was said to be held of Ralph de Gorges of Knighton Gorges Manor. At the end of the 13th century it was held by John de la Brigge, from whom it passed with Bridge Court (q.v.) to the Kingstons. It followed the descent of Kingston until 1424, when Robert Dingley and Lewis Meux conveyed it to John Taillour, who was returned in 1431, as holding Wackland. Its descent has not been traced from that time until the end of the 18th century. Some time before 1786 it must have been in the possession of Thomas Davis, as he left a charge of 20s. upon it for charities. In the early part of the 19th century Wackland was the residence of a hunting farmer, well known as 'Squire' Thatcher, who kept and hunted a pack of harriers. Mr. E. Carter was lord of Wackland in 1878, and as of 1912 it belonged to the trustees of the late Mr. Thomas F. Perrott.
