= Marwell (disambiguation) =

Marwell may refer to:

== People ==
- David G. Marwell (born 1951), American historian
- Gerald Marwell (1937–2013), American sociologist
- Marwell Periotti (1939–2004), Argentine footballer

== Other uses ==
- Marwell (horse), a racehorse
- Marwell College, a former collegiate church in Hampshire, England
- Marwell Zoo, on the estate of Marwell Hall, near Winchester, England
