= John Berkeley (1352–1428) =

English politician

Sir John Berkeley (21 January 1352 – 5 March 1428), of Beverston Castle, Gloucestershire was an English politician. He was knighted before 1383.

== Life ==
He was the son of Thomas Berkeley, 3rd Baron Berkeley, of Berkeley Castle, and his second wife Katherine Clivedon.

He was appointed High Sheriff of Somerset and Dorset for 1390–91 and 1394–95, High Sheriff of Gloucestershire for 1392–93, 1397–98 and 1414–15, High Sheriff of Hampshire for 1402–03 and 1406–07, and High Sheriff of Wiltshire for 1410–11.

He was a Member (MP) of the Parliament of England for Gloucestershire in February 1388, September 1388 and January 1397, for Somerset in November 1390 and 1394, for Wiltshire in 1402 and Hampshire in 1406. He married 3 times but only had children, 14 sons and 3 daughters, with his second wife, Elizabeth Betteshorne, including:

- Eleanor Berkeley, who married John FitzAlan, 13th Earl of Arundel and had children. She married secondly Sir Richard Poynings, son of Robert Poynings, 4th Baron Poynings. Their daughter, Eleanor Poynings, married Henry Percy, 3rd Earl of Northumberland. She married thirdly Walter Hungerford, 1st Baron Hungerford.
- Sir Maurice Berkeley, who married Lora FitzHugh.
- Elizabeth Berkeley, who first married Edward Charleton, 5th Baron Cherleton, with whom she had children, and secondly John Sutton, 1st Baron Dudley, with whom she had more children.
- Joan Berkeley, who married Sir Thomas Stawell.
