= John Popham (military commander) =

English politician (c.1395–1463)

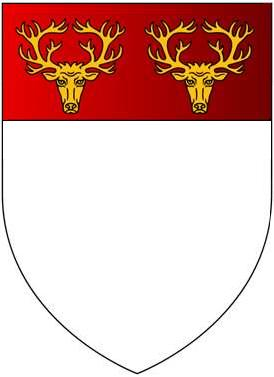
Arms of Popham: Argent, on a chief gules two stag's heads cabossed or

Sir John Popham (c. 1395 – c. 1463) was MP for Hampshire and Sheriff of Hampshire. He was a military commander and speaker-elect of the House of Commons. He took part in Henry V's invasion of France in 1415 and in the French wars under John of Lancaster, 1st Duke of Bedford. He was elected Speaker of the House of Commons in 1449 but was permitted by King Henry VI to decline the office on the ground of infirmity.

== Origins ==
He was the son of Sir John Popham (died 1418) of South Charford, Hampshire, (four times MP for Hampshire and Sheriff of Hampshire in 1404), who was a younger son of Sir John Popham of Popham, Hampshire and a younger brother of Henry Popham, Sheriff of Hampshire (c. 1339 – 1418) of Popham, seven times MP for Hampshire.

== Career ==
He may have been educated at Bishop Wykeham's College of St Mary at Winchester. John and his first cousin Sir Stephen Popham (c. 1386 – 1444), MP, (son of Henry Popham) were men-at-arms under Edward, Duke of York, in the French campaign of 1415 and John was probably knighted after the Battle of Agincourt. He served again in 1417 in the conquest of Lower Normandy and was appointed bailli of Caen in December 1417 and captain of Bayeux in January 1421. In October 1418, he was awarded the governorship of Southampton Castle in succession to his father, holding it until 1441.

After Henry V's death his appointments at Bayeux and Caen were terminated and he served the regent, John, Duke of Bedford as chancellor of France or of Normandy between September 1422 and January 1424, and later as Bedford's chancellor, lieutenant at Rouen (January–November 1429) and chamberlain (from April 1429). He fought at the sieges of Pontorson and Orléans and was closely involved with arranging the defence of Paris following French successes under Jeanne d'Arc in 1429.

Back in England, he became Treasurer of the Household from 17 April 1437 until April 1439 and was elected knight of the shire (MP) for Hampshire in November 1439. He was again returned for Hampshire in 1449 and was nominated as Speaker of the House, but declined the responsibility on the grounds of ill-health.

== Death, burial and succession ==
He died on 14 April 1463, and was buried in the Charterhouse. He had never married, and his estates passed to the four daughters of his cousin Stephen Popham (c. 1386 – 1444) of Popham, Hampshire.

== Sources ==
- Tait, James, Biography of Popham, John (d.1463?), Dictionary of National Biography, 1885–1900, Volume 46
