= Robert Thistlethwayte (politician) =

English politician (1755-1802)

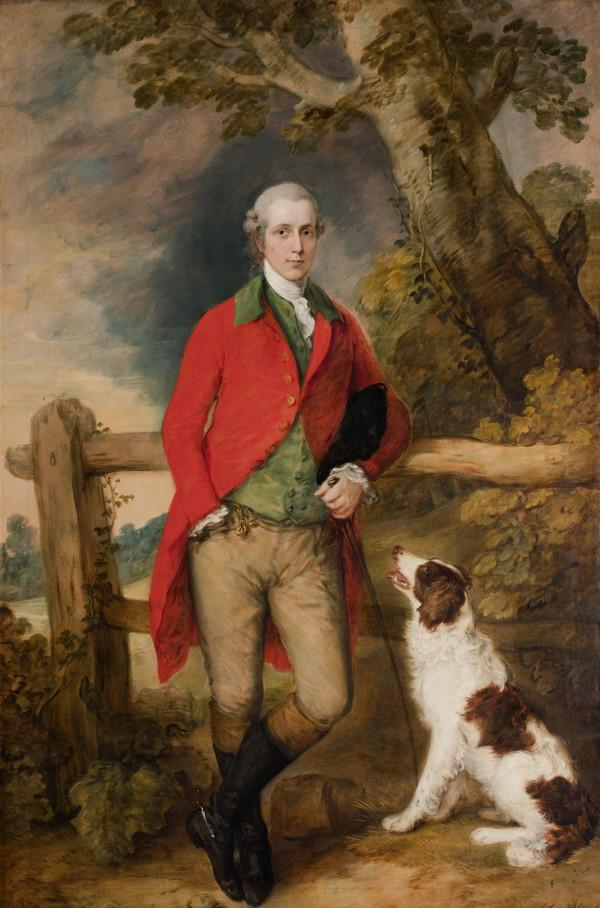
- Robert Thistlethwayte circa 1778

MP for Hampshire
- In office 1780–1790

Personal details
- Born: 24 May 1755
- Died: 22 October 1802 (aged 47)
- Children: Thomas Thistlethwayte

Robert Thistlethwayte (24 May 1755 – 22 October 1802) was an English politician. He was a member of the St. Alban's Tavern group.

== See also ==
- List of MPs elected in the 1780 British general election
- List of MPs elected in the 1784 British general election
