= Sir John Marshal =

English baron and justice

- Born: 1170?
- Died: 1235
- Occupations: Baron and justice

Sir John Marshal (1170?–1235) was an English baron and justice.

== Biography ==
Marshal was a nephew of William Marshal, first earl of Pembroke, and consequently grandson of John Marshal. His father was probably Anselm, third son of the latter, for John, the eldest, appears to have died childless, while Henry, the youngest, was bishop of Exeter. Anselm Marshal is known only from the 'Histoire de Guillaume le Marechal' (ll. 337–8, 4037–8), where Sire Ansel li Mareschals, Franz e doz e proz e leials, is mentioned as taking part in a great tournament at Lagni-sur-Marne about 1180. John Marshal was probably born about 1170, for he first appears as a knight in 1197, when he accompanied his uncle, William Marshal, on his embassy to Count Baldwin of Flanders (ib. i. 10763). In September 1198 he was fighting under his uncle and Count Baldwin, and was sent by them to bear the news of Philip's retreat from before Arras to King Richard (ib. 11. 10901–17). On 31 January 1203 he was in charge of Falaise (Cat. Hot. Pat. p. 24), and a little later received a grant of the lands of the Count of Évreux in England (Stapleton, Rotuli Normanniæ, ii. clxxiii). In April 1204 he had license to go into Ireland as his uncle's representative, and to hold the stewardship of his lands in Ireland (Sweetman, i. 210, 216), He was still in Ireland on 13 February 1205, and probably remained there till late in 1207, when on 8 November we find him, in company with Meiler FitzHenry, at the king's court at Woodstock (ib. 254, 310, S48). On 12 November he received a grant of the marshalry of Ireland, and of the 'cantred of the vill of Kyhnie' (ib. 353). John Marshal appears at this time to have adhered rather to the king than to his uncle; in June 1210 he accompanied the former on his Irish expedition (ib. 401, 404). As marshal of Ireland he had an annuity of twenty-five marks (ib. 532). On 10 June 1213 he had charge of the castles of Whitchurch and Screward in Shropshire (Cal. Hot. Pat. p. 100), and on 25 January 1214 of the county of Lincoln and its coasts. He was also put in charge of the Welsh marches, and received a grant of the manor of Hingham and hundred of Fourho (ib. p. 109). On 25 June 1215 he received the custody of the counties of Norfolk and Suffolk, with the castles of Norwich and Orford, but surrendered them on 24–8 July in exchange for Somerset, Dorset, and Worcester, with the castles of Sherborne and Dorchester. At this time he also surrendered Lincolnshire (ib. pp. 150–1). On 17 September he received the charge of the forests in the same counties (ib. p. 155 b ). Marshal had supported the king in his struggle with the barons, and had been with him at Runnymede on 15 June. He was now appointed on 4 September to go to Rome on the king's behalf with Richard de Marisco' and others (ib. p, 182 b). He was back in England by the end of the year, and accompanied John on his northward march in December. On 2 June 1216 he had power to take into favour all rebels who surrendered (ib. p. 185). John Marshal was present at the coronation of the young king at Worcester on 28 October, and next year fought under his uncle at Lincoln on 20 May. Soon afterwards he was commissioned with Philip d'Albini to make preparations for opposing the expected French fleet, and presumably was present in the battle with Eustace the Monk on 24 August. Marshal had been made sheriff of Hampshire and custos of Devizes earlier in the year; in 1218 he was a justice of the forest, and in 1219 a justice itinerant for the counties of Lincoln, Nottingham, and Derby (Cal. Hot Glaus, i.407; cf. Shirley, i. 20).

On 15 July 1221 he was sent on a mission to Ireland to receive surrender of the justiciarship from Geoffrey de Marisco, which he did on 4 October. In December 1222 he was appointed for another mission to Ireland, though he did not cross over till February 1223. His duty was apparently to advise the new justiciar, Henry of London, archbishop of Dublin, as to the provisioning of the royal castles. On 3 June he received charge, as the king's bailiff, of the lands of Cork, Decies, and Desmond, with their castles, and on the same day the justiciar was specially instructed to act by his advice (Sweetman, i. 1000, 1015, 1062–3, 1083–7, 1107, 1118). Next year he was still in Ireland, and after assisting his cousin, William Marshal, in his war with Hugh de Lacy, was sent to England in October in charge of Hugh (ib. 1205; Ann, Mon. iii. 91). Marshal was one of the sureties for Walter de Lacy, sixth baron Lacy on 13 May 1225, and in August went abroad on a mission for the king (Cal. Hot. Clam. ii. 47, 59). In January 1226 he was sent to the council held by the legate Otto at Westminster to forbid the bishops from incurring any obligation to the Roman church in respect of their lay fees.

In February 1228 he was once more sent to Ireland (Sweetman, i. 1563, 1572), in June 1230 was a justice for assize of arms in Norfolk and Suffolk (Shirley, i. 375), and in 1232 was engaged on yet another mission to Ireland, apparently as one of the executors of William Marshal' (d. 1231), and on behalf of his widow, Eleanor, the king's sister (Sweetman, i. 1949; Excerpta e Rot. Fin. i. 217). On 26 September 1234 he witnesses a royal letter at Marlborough, and on 22 February 1235 the contract of marriage between the king's sister Isabella and the Emperor Frederick (Sweetman, i. 21 77; Fœdera, i. 223). Marshal died before 27 June 1235 (Recerpta e Hot Fin. i. 284). By his wife Aliva, daughter of Hubert de Rie (d. 1172), who was alive in 1263, when she is described as over ninety years of age (ib. ii. 406; Cal. Genealogicum, i. Ill), he had two sons, John and William (Sweetman, i. 2369). John married Margaret de Neubourg, sister of Thomas, sixth earl of Warwick, and after 26 June 1242 was in right of his wife earl of Warwick. He died without children in October 1242. William sided with the barons in 1263–4, and was one of their representatives at the Mise of Amiens. William's grandson, of the same name, was summoned to parliament as baron from 9 January 1309 to 26 November 1313, and was killed at Bannockburn in 1314 (Flores Historiarum, iii. 159, Rolls Ser.) John, son of William II, died in 1316, and his barony passed with his sister Hawyse to Robert, lord Morley, and was held by the Morleys, Lovels, and Parkers, barons Morley, till 1686, when it fell into abeyance.
