= Thomas White (died 1566) =

Member of the Parliament of England for Hampshire

Sir Thomas White (25 March 1507 – 2 November 1566) was an English politician.

== Family ==
He was the eldest son of Robert White junr. of South Warnborough, Hampshire (son of Robert White and Margaret Gaynesford), and Elizabeth, daughter of Sir Thomas Englefield the elder. He was almost 14 years old when his father died in 1521, and he became the ward of John Morys (Morris), who soon afterwards became Keeper of an episcopal park in Farnham, Surrey. Thomas White married Agnes, the daughter of Robert White of Farnham. They had 14 sons and 6 daughters, but some of them died in childhood. His sister Sybill married (as his first wife) Sir John White of Aldershot, Alderman and Lord Mayor of London, brother of John White, the Marian Bishop of Lincoln (1554–1556) and Bishop of Winchester (1556–1559).

== Career ==
Having studied law at the Inner Temple, he was treasurer of the bishopric of Winchester from 1538 to his death, and Keeper of Farnham Castle, Surrey from 1540 to death. He was elected Knight of the Shire for Hampshire seven times between 1547 and 1559. A strong Catholic, he was knighted at Westminster by the Earl of Arundel on 2 October 1553, the day after the coronation of Queen Mary I, and served as a Master of Requests during Mary's reign from 1553 to 1558.

According to the inscription on their stone altar-tomb at South Warnborough, he died in London in 1566 and Dame Agnes died in Canterbury in January 1570–71.
