= John Dabrichecourt =

English politician (died 1415)

Sir John Dabrichecourt (died 1415) was an English politician. He sat as MP for Derbyshire in 1393 and September 1397.

He was the son of Sir Sanchet D'Abrichecourt and the brother of Sir Nicholas Dabrichecourt, the former of whom descended from immigrants to England from Hainault and was a member of the Order of the Garter. By September 1378, he married Maud, the widow of Sir John Tuchet and they had one son and 5 daughters. He had two illegitimate sons. He was knighted by October 1375 and became a Knight of the Garter on 20 March 1413. His stall plate was stolen from its location in 1844.

He had served as a soldier under the reigns of both Henry IV and Henry V, with his knighthood having occurred on the basis of his performance in battle during the Hundred Years' War. In 1400, he was retained as a knight under Henry V. Dabrichecourt also served as Constable of the Tower, a post which was at the time commonly held by knights. Dabrichecourt served as a captain during the Battle of Agincourt in 1415.
