= Richard Kingsmill (MP) =

16th-century English politician

Richard Kingsmill (c. 1528 – 24 September 1600), of Highclere, Hampshire, was an English politician.

He was the son of Sir John Kingsmill (c. 1494 – 11 August 1556), Sheriff of Hampshire in 1539. His brother Sir William Kingsmill (c. 1526 – 11 December 1592) was Sheriff of Hampshire in 1563.

He was a Member (MP) of the Parliament of England for Calne in 1559, Heytesbury in 1563, and Hampshire in 1584 and 1586.

By his daughter Constance Kingsmill, he was the grandfather of Sir Thomas Lucy.
