= Thomas Thistlethwayte =

English politician (1779–1850)

MP for Hampshire
- In office 1806–1807

Personal details
- Born: 14 September 1779
- Died: 14 September 1850 (aged 71)
- Parent: Robert Thistlethwayte (father)
- Military career
- Allegiance: Great Britain; United Kingdom
- Branch: Militia
- Service years: 1798-1807
- Rank: Lieutenant colonel
- Units: North Hampshire Militia; South Hampshire Light Infantry Militia

Thomas Thistlethwayte (14 September 1779 – 14 September 1850) was an English politician. He additionally served as High Sheriff of Hampshire in 1812–1813.

== See also ==
- List of MPs elected in the 1806 United Kingdom general election
