= Chantry =

Place of worship or a form of liturgy

A chantry is an ecclesiastical term that may have either of two related meanings:

1. a chantry service, a set of Christian liturgical celebrations for the dead (made up of the Requiem Mass and the Office of the Dead), or
2. a chantry chapel, a building on private land, or an area in a parish church or cathedral reserved for the performance of these celebrations.

In the Medieval Era through to the Age of Enlightenment it was commonly believed such liturgies might help atone for misdeeds and assist the soul to obtain eternal peace.

== Etymology ==
The word "chantry" derives from Old French chanter and from the Latin cantare (to sing). Its medieval derivative cantaria means "licence to sing mass". The French term for this commemorative institution is chapellenie (chaplaincy).

== Overview ==
=== Liturgy for the dead ===
Firstly, a chantry could mean the prayers and liturgy in the Christian church for the benefit of the dead, as part of the search for atonement for sins committed during their lives. It might include the mass and by extension, the endowment left for the purpose of the continuance of prayers and liturgy.

It could be called a type of "trust fund" established during the pre-Reformation medieval era in England for the purpose of employing one or more priests to sing a stipulated number of services for the benefit of the soul of a specified deceased person, usually the donor who had established the chantry in his will. There could be a stipulated period of time immediately following her/his death.

It was believed such masses might help atone for misdeeds and with mercy enable the soul to be granted eternal peace in the presence of God. Chantries were commonly established in England and were endowed with lands, rents from specified properties, and other assets of the donor, usually in his will. The income from these assets maintained the "chantry" priest.

=== Privately built chapels ===
Secondly, a chantry chapel is a building on private land or a dedicated area or altar within a parish church or cathedral, set aside or built especially for the performance of the "chantry duties" by the priest. A chantry may occupy a single altar, for example in the side aisle of a church, or an enclosed chapel within a larger church, generally dedicated to the donor's favourite saint.

Many chantry altars became richly endowed, often with gold furnishings and valuable vestments. Over the centuries, chantries increased in embellishments, often by attracting new donors and chantry priests. Those feoffees who could afford to employ them in many cases enjoyed great wealth. Sometimes this led to corruption of the consecrated life expected of clergymen. It also led in general to an accumulation of great wealth and power in the Church, beyond the feudal control of the Crown. This evident amassing of assets was one of the pretexts used by King Henry VIII to order the dissolution of the monasteries in England.

At the time of the Dissolution, chantries were abolished and their assets were sold or granted to persons at the discretion of Henry and his son King Edward VI, via the Court of Augmentations. Many Tudor businessmen, such as Thomas Bell (1486–1566) of Gloucester, acquired chantries as financial investments for the afterlife, but yielding income streams in the here and now, derived from chantry rents; or the chantry assets could be "unbundled" and sold on piecemeal at a profit.

A surviving free-standing chapel is the Lovekyn Chapel at Kingston upon Thames, within what is now Kingston Grammar School. The Grade II* listed chapel was founded in 1309 and is no longer used for religious services.

== Mass for the dead ==
The Christian practices of prayer and offering mass for the repose of the soul of a deceased person are recorded as early as the 3rd and 4th centuries respectively. The custom of having quantities of masses offered for the dead is first recorded in the early 7th century, in connection with the developing understanding of transferable spiritual credit and clerical stipends. By around the year 700 the practice had emerged across Western Europe of priests saying multiple masses simultaneously, driving the proliferation of side altars.

The most common form was the anniversarium or missa annualis, a mass said annually on the anniversary of a person's death. At the Council of Attigny in 765, about 40 abbots and bishops agreed to say mass and recite the psalms for the repose of the souls of their deceased brethren. Ninth-century France and England have records of numerous such undertakings between monasteries and churches, whereby they would offer prayers for the souls of deceased members of each other's communities. Before the year 1000 in Italy, France and England, parishes extended the benefits of such facilities to the laity. Kings and great magnates asked for prayers for their souls in the monasteries they had founded.

=== Origin of chantries ===
Current theory described by Colvin (2000) locates the origins of the chantry in the rapid expansion of regular monasteries in the 11th century. The abbey of Cluny and its hundreds of daughter houses were central to this: the Cluniac order emphasised an elaborate liturgy as the centre of its common life, developing an unrivalled liturgy for the dead and offering its benefits to its patrons. By the 1150s, the order had so many demands for masses for the dead that Peter the Venerable placed a moratorium on further endowments.

Other monastic orders benefited from this movement, but similarly became burdened by commemoration. The history of the Cistercian house of Bordesley (Worcestershire), a royal abbey, demonstrates this: in the mid-12th century, it offered the services of two priest monks, presumably to say mass, for the soul of Robert de Stafford; between 1162 and 1173, it offered the services of an additional six monks for the souls of Earl Hugh of Chester and his family. This sort of dedication of prayers towards particular individuals was a step towards the institutional chantry.

Crouch (2001) points to the parallel development of communities or colleges of secular priests or canons as another theory of influence on the evolution of the chantry. Such communities were not monastic foundations: although members lived a similar lifestyle to monks they differed in that their monastic rule was relaxed to allow preaching and ministry, beyond the confines of their institution, to the population at large. Like the monasteries, they offered dedicated prayers for the dead. An example is the collegiate church of Marwell (Hampshire), founded by Bishop Henry of Winchester in the early 1160s. The priests of the college were to pray for the souls of the bishops of Winchester and kings of England. Gradually perpetual masses for the dead were delegated to one altar and one secular priest within a greater church.

=== Royal endowments ===
The family of King Henry II of England (1154–1189) contributed greatly to religious patronage. Henry II founded at least one daily mass for his soul by his gift of the manor of Lingoed in Gwent to Dore Abbey in Herefordshire; he provided for the services in perpetuity of four monk-priests. In 1183 the king lost his eldest son, Henry the Young King. In 1185 his third son, Duke Geoffrey II of Brittany, died in a tournament near Paris. Henry II commemorated his sons by founding what resembled the classic institutional chantry: he endowed altars and priests at Rouen Cathedral in perpetuity for the soul of the young Henry.

King Philip II of France endowed priests at the cathedral of Notre Dame in Paris for the soul of Duke Geoffrey. John, Count of Mortain, the youngest son of Henry II, also created chantry-like foundations: in 1192 he endowed the collegiate church of Bakewell in Derbyshire for the establishment of a prebend at Lichfield Cathedral; the holder was to celebrate mass in perpetuity for John's soul. The concept of the institutional chantry thus developed in the 1180s within English and French royal circles, which were wealthy enough to endow them.

In non-royal society, the first perpetual mass was endowed by Richard FitzReiner, Sheriff of the City of London, in his private chapel within his manor of Broad Colney in Hertfordshire. He established it by the terms of his last testament in 1191, and the chantry was operational in 1212. A close associate of the Angevin royal court, FitzReiner may have adopted its religious practice.

=== Provision in later medieval England ===
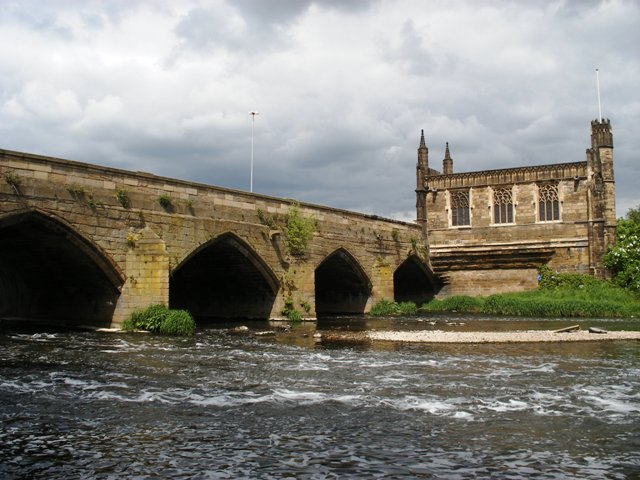
Chantry Chapel of St Mary the Virgin, Wakefield, West Yorkshire

Analysis of later medieval wills has shown that the chantry appeared in many forms. A perpetual chantry consisted of one or more priests, in a private free-standing chapel, usually licensed by the local bishop (such as the surviving one at Noseley, Leicestershire) or in an aisle of a greater church. If chantries were in religious communities, they were sometimes headed by a warden or archpriest. Such chantries generally had constitutions directing the terms by which priests might be appointed and how they were to be supervised. The perpetual chantry was the most prestigious and expensive option for the wealthy burgess or nobleman. A lesser option was the endowment of a fixed-term chantry, to fund masses sung by one or two priests at a side altar. Terms ranging from one to ten years were more common than the perpetual variety of chantry.

== Abolition of Chantries Acts, 1545 and 1547 ==
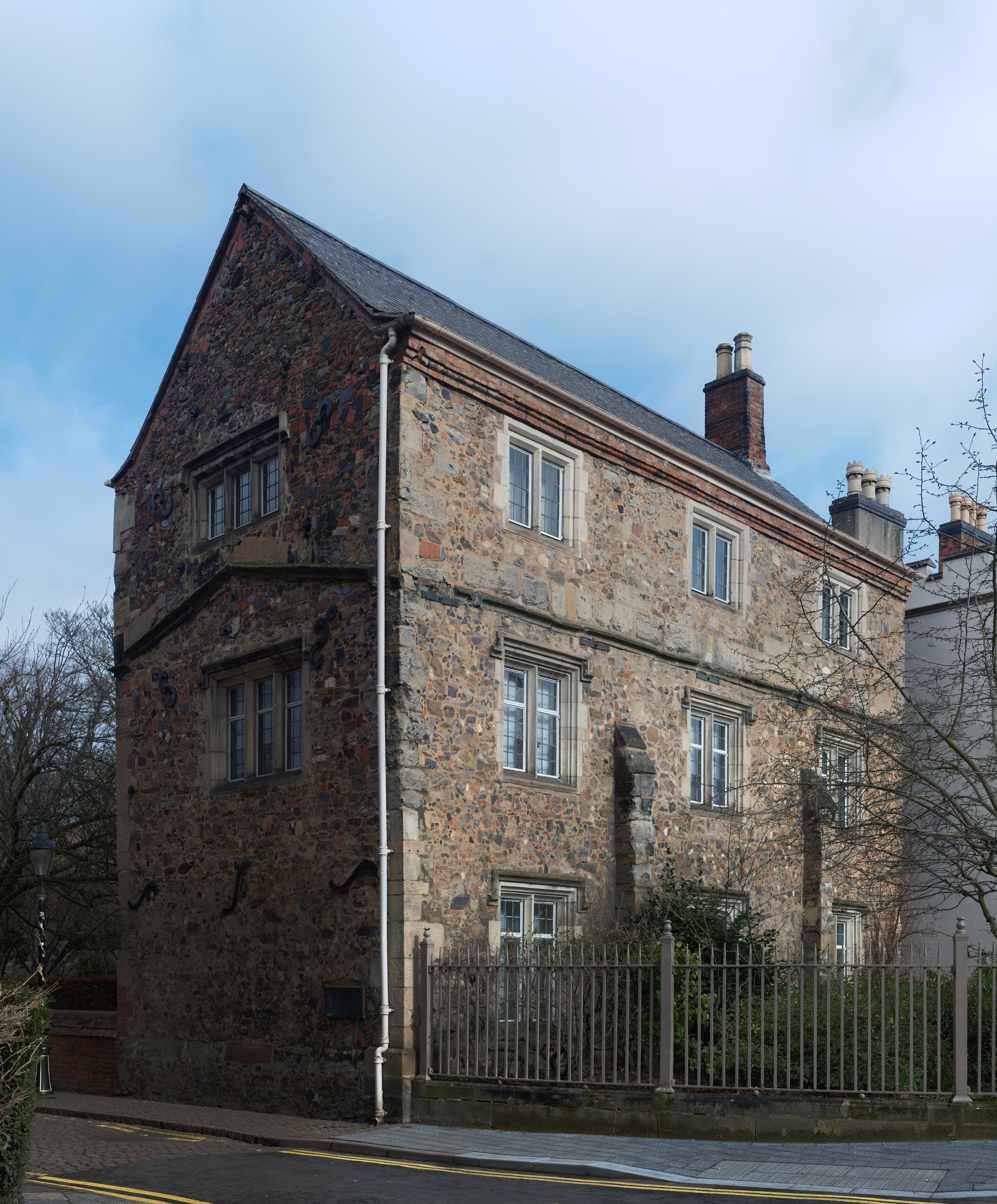
William Wyggeston's chantry house, built around 1511, in Leicester: The building housed two priests, who served at a chantry chapel in the nearby St Mary de Castro church. It was sold as a private dwelling after the dissolution of the chantries.

Following the Reformation in England initiated by King Henry VIII, Parliament passed an Act in 1545 which defined chantries as representing misapplied funds and misappropriated lands. The act provided that all chantries and their properties would thenceforth belong to the King for as long as he should live. In conjunction with the dissolution of the monasteries, the act helped to finance the war with France. Because Henry lived for only two years after the act was passed, few chantries were closed or transferred to him. His young son and successor, King Edward VI, signed a new Act in 1547, which ended 2,374 chantries and guild chapels and seized their assets; it also instituted inquiries to determine all of their possessions.

Although the act required the money to go to "charitable" ends and the "public good", most of it appears to have gone to friends of the Court. The Crown sold many chantries to private citizens; for example, in 1548 Thomas Bell of Gloucester purchased at least five in his city. The act provided that the Crown had to guarantee a pension to all chantry priests displaced by its implementation.

An example of the fate of an abolished chantry is St Anne's Chapel in Barnstaple, Devon: its assets were acquired by the Mayor of Barnstaple and others in 1585, some time after the Dissolution of the Monasteries. The deed of feoffment dated 1 November 1585 exists in the George Grant Francis collection in Swansea, summarised as follows:

(i) Robert Appley the elder, Robert Cade, Hugh Brasyer and Richard Wetheridge of Barnestaple to: (ii) William Plamer, mayor of Barnestaple, Richard Dodderidge, Roger Cade, Symon Monngey, Robert Appley the younger, Robert Pronze (Prouse?), Roger Beaple, George Pyne, gent., Jacob Wescombe, Gilbert Hareys, Robert Marlen, Thomas Mathewe, James Beaple, George Baker, James Downe, William Bayly, John Collybeare, Robert Collybeare, and John Knyll of Barnestaple; 1 Chancery and Chapel of St Anne lately dissolved in Barnestaple with 1 house with land belonging to the late Chancery and Chapel; also 1 house and land in Barnestaple which John Littlestone of Barnestaple, merchant, and John Buddle, potter, granted to (i).

One of the most significant effects of the chantries, and the most significant loss resulting from their suppression, was educational, as chantry priests had provided education. Katherine, Lady Berkeley had founded the first chantry school in 1384. Since chantry priests were not ordinaries, nor did they offer public masses, they could serve their communities in other ways. When King Edward VI closed the chantries, priests were displaced who had previously taught the urban poor and rural residents; afterwards, local residents suffered greatly diminished access to education for their children. Some of the chantries were converted into grammar schools named after King Edward.

Royal peculiars were not covered by any of the above Acts of Parliament, so were not abolished. Most declined over time, until the jurisdiction of almost all was abolished in the 19th century. Some royal peculiars survive, including Westminster Abbey and St George's Chapel, Windsor.

Historian A. G. Dickens has concluded:

To Catholic opinion, the problem set by these legal confiscations ... [was] the disappearance of a large clerical society from their midst, the silencing of masses, the rupture of both visible and spiritual ties, which over so many centuries have linked rude provincial men with the great world of the Faith. In taking an essentially religious view of these events, these Englishmen seem to the present writer to have had every justification. ... The Edwardian dissolution exerted its profounder effects in the field of religion. In large part it proved destructive, for while it helped to debar a revival of Catholic devotion it clearly contains elements which injured the reputation of Protestantism.

== See also ==
- Prayer for the dead

== Sources ==
- Burgess, C. (1987). "By quick and by dead: Wills and pious provision in late medieval Bristol". English Historical Review, 102, 837–858.
- Duffy, E. (1993). The Stripping of the Altars, New Haven, CT.
- Roffey, S. (2007). The Medieval Chantry Chapel: an archaeological approach, Woodbridge: Boydell.
- Sicard, D. (1978). "La liturgie de la mort dans l'église latine des origines à la réforme carolingienne". Liturgiewissenschaftliche Quellen und Forschungen, 63, 174–202.
- Treffort, C. (1996). L'église carolingienne et la mort Lyon, FR.
- Wood-Legh, K.L. (1965). Perpetual Chantries in Britain, Cambridge, UK.
