= John Morris (MP) =

John Morris MP

Member of Parliament for Steyning
- In office 1529–1536

Keeper of Farnham Park, Farnham Castle
- In office 1524–1540

Justice of the Peace for Surrey
- In office 1531–1532

Receiver of Syon Abbey estates (Surrey and Sussex)
- In office 1534–1540

Personal details
- Born: by 1500
- Died: 5 July 1540
- Spouse: Unknown
- Children: John Morris (probable), others unrecorded
- Relatives: Richard Morris (d.1592), George Morris of London (probable grandsons); Mary Morris, Countess of Dover (great-granddaughter)
- Occupation: Administrator; politician
- Known for: MP for Steyning (1529); ecclesiastical and Crown service

John Morris (also spelled Morys, Morrys; d. 5 July 1540) was an English administrator and politician who served the Crown and the Church during the reign of Henry VIII. He was Member of Parliament for Steyning in 1529, probably re-elected in 1536, in compliance with King Henry VIII’s request that previous members be returned, and held the offices of Keeper of Farnham Park, Justice of the Peace for Surrey, and Receiver of Syon Abbey estates in Surrey and Sussex. In 1535, Morris was listed in the will of Sir Davis Owen, son of Sir Owen Tudor.

== Life ==
The parentage of John Morris is unknown, but he first appears in records in 1521, when he was granted the wardship of Thomas White II of South Warnborough, Hampshire, and custody of a manor in Kent during White’s minority.

Crown and ecclesiastical service:

- Keeper of Farnham Park, Farnham Castle, Surrey (from 1524).
- Appointed tax collector by Parliament (16 November 1526).
- Justice of the Peace for Surrey (1531–32).
- Receiver of Syon Abbey estates in Surrey and Sussex (by 1534).
- Commissioner for the tenths of spiritualities, Surrey (1535).
- Employed in the Valor Ecclesiasticus (1535).
- Receiver of Revenues for Surrey for Court of Augmentation (1536).
- Directed the dissolution of Boxgrove Priory, Sussex (1537).
- Assisted in compiling the inventory of Syon Abbey’s goods (1539)

=== Parliamentary service ===
Morris was returned as Member of Parliament for Steyning, Sussex, in 1529. At that time the manor and borough belonged to Syon Abbey, whose steward and receiver was Morris, likely explaining his selection. His fellow Member was Thomas Shirley, brother of Sir Richard Shirley of Sussex.

In 1532, John Morrys (Morris) appears in the records of the Star Chamber, named in the case Hyggons v. Owen. The dispute centered on the manor of Bury, Sussex, property under the control of the College of Arundel. John Hyggons, Gentleman, had held a lawful lease of the manor beginning in September 1532, but his possession was challenged when Sir Henry Owen, Knight, attempted to assert a claim through what was described as a “feigned bargain” arranged by William Turner. Despite subsequent sales of the lease interest back to Hyggons, Sir Henry Owen (first cousin of Henry VII) and his allies—including Thomas Harrys and John Morrys, yeomen—forcibly entered the property at the close of September 1532 and “still kept possession of the same.”

In January 1534, shortly before the sixth session of the Reformation Parliament, Morris informed the clerk of the Council that the abbess and nuns of Syon had refused to recognize the King's divorce. He was questioned but exonerated of blame. In 1535, he was interrogated by Thomas Cromwell after discussions with Bishop Stephen Gardiner about papal primacy. Morris affirmed that an Act of Parliament for the commonwealth carried greater authority within England than any General Council, declaring that, "as verily present at such an Act as it ever was at any General Council." These statements aligned him with Cromwell’s reformist agenda and reinforced his reliability to the Crown.

In 1537 he dissolved Boxgrove Priory and reported a fugitive priest from Syon to Cromwell. His administrative expertise was repeatedly employed by the Crown in monastic and diocesan affairs.

In 1539, William Fitzwilliam, Earl of Southampton nominated Morris to serve in Parliament again to represent for Farnham.

=== Death and Legacies ===
John Morris made his will on 19 December 1536, leaving money to the poor, for masses for his soul and that of his wife, and bequests to Syon Abbey (£10, which lapsed at the Dissolution) and Farnham church (£14 6s. 8d. towards a steeple). He appointed his wife as residuary legatee and executrix.

Morris is believed to have been the father or grandfather of:

- George Morris of London, father of Ralph Morris of Helmingham, Suffolk, who entered the Visitation of Suffolk in 1577.
- Richard Morris (d. 1592), merchant of London, Master of the Ironmongers in 1585, 1588. He married Maud (Matilda) Daborne, daughter of John Daborne of Guildford, thrice Mayor of Guildford. Their daughter Mary Morris married Sir William Cockayne, Lord Mayor of London (1619), and later Henry Carey, 1st Earl of Dover, becoming Countess of Dover.

=== Arms ===
Ralph Morris (Morys) and Richard Morris were observed using arms that Morris bore during his tenure supporting Farnham as Keeper:

Vert, a buck passant Or;

Crest: A talbot Gules, collared and lined Or

The arms appeared in Papworth's Ordinary of British Armorials, the Visitation of Suffolk in 1577, Burke's General Armory, and Glover's Ordinary of Arms.
