= Walter Sandys (died 1435) =

Member of the Parliament of England

Sir Walter Sandys (c. 1376–1435) was an English politician, MP for Hampshire.

Sandys was the eldest son of Sir John Sandys MP.

He married firstly Agnes, daughter of Thomas Warrener; and secondly Margaret, daughter of John Erleigh, widow of John Seymour.

He served as High Sheriff of Hampshire 1410–11 and 1423–24, MP for Hampshire in the Parliament of April 1414, and JP for Hampshire 1416–24 and 1431 until death.

Parliament of England
| Preceded by John Uvedale; John Arnold | Member of Parliament for Hampshire; 1414; With: William Brocas | Succeeded by Thomas Wallop; Lewis John |
