= Jack Arnold =

Jack Arnold is the name of:

- Jack Arnold (director) (1912–1992), American film and television director
- Jack Arnold (rugby league) (1919–1997), Australian rugby league player
- Jack Arnold (1906–1970), name used by American actor Vinton Hayworth
- Jack Arnold, the name of Dan Lauria's character on The Wonder Years
- Jack Arnold, (Long Distance Runner)(2010), American endurance runner

== See also ==
- John Arnold (disambiguation)
