= John de Lisle =

John de Lisle may refer to:

- John de Lisle (constable), Constables and Governors of Windsor Castle
- John de Lisle (cricketer), (1891–1961), Leicestershire cricket captain
- Baron Lisle
  - John de Lisle, 1st Baron Lisle (d. 1304)
  - John de Lisle, 2nd Baron Lisle (first creation) (1281–1337) (first creation 1299)
  - John de Lisle, 2nd Baron Lisle (second creation) (1318–1355) (second creation 1311), a companion of the future King Edward III of England, and one of the founders and eighth Knight of the Garter in 1348

== See also ==
- John Lisle (disambiguation)
