= Thomas West (MP died 1622) =

English politician

Sir Thomas West (died 1622) was an English politician.

He was a younger son of Sir George West of Warbleton, Sussex.

He was a member (MP) of the Parliament of England for Chichester in 1571, for Mitchell in 1572 and for Hampshire in 1589.

He served as a justice of the peace for Hampshire from c. 1573 and was appointed High Sheriff of Hampshire for 1585–1586. He was knighted in 1591.

On his death he was buried in Eling church. He had married a daughter and co-heiress of Mr Hotofts of Hampshire and had one daughter.
