= Thomas Jervoise (died 1693) =

English politician (1616–1693)

- Born: 16 March 1616
- Died: 13 May 1693 (aged 77)
- Occupation: an English politician

Thomas Jervoise (16 March 1616 – 13 May 1693) was an English politician who sat in the House of Commons on two occasions between 1680 and 1689.

Jervoise was the son of Sir Thomas Jervoise of Britford (Wiltshire) and Herriard (Hampshire), and his wife Lucy Powlet, daughter of Sir Richard Powlet of Herriard. His father had been MP for Whitchurch.

He was a Parliamentary Captain of Horse in 1643–6, and a commissioner and captain of the Hampshire Militia in 1660; he was still commanding a Troop of militia horse in 1685.

He was appointed High Sheriff of Hampshire for 1666–67. In November 1680, he was elected member of parliament for Hampshire for a year. He was re-elected to the seat in February 1689 and held it until 1690.

Jervaise died at the age of 75 and was buried at Herriard. He had married Mary, the daughter of George Purefoy of Wadley, Berkshire and they had 2 sons and 4 daughters. His son Thomas (d.1743) sat in Parliament for a variety of seats.
