= Thomas Skelton (MP died 1416) =

English politician

Sir Thomas Skelton (died 1416), of Hinxton, Cambridgeshire and Sherborne 'Coudray', Hampshire, was an English politician.

He was a member (MP) of the parliament of England for Cambridgeshire in January 1397 and for Hampshire in 1399 and 1406.
