= Robert More (MP, died 1407) =

English politician

Robert More II (died 1407), of Pamber, Hampshire, was an English politician.

He was the son of John atte More of Pamber.

More was appointed High Sheriff of Hampshire for 1393–1394 and was elected a Member of Parliament for Hampshire in September 1397.
