= Henry Seymour (16th-century MP) =

English landowner and MP

The Honourable Henry Seymour KB
- Born: Henry Seymour c. 1503; Wulfhall, Wiltshire
- Died: 5 April 1578 (aged 74–75); Winchester
- Occupation: MP
- Spouse: Barbara Wolfe (m. 1559)
- Children: Sir John Seymour; Jane Seymour
- Parents: Sir John Seymour; Margery Wentworth
- Relatives: Jane Seymour

Sir Henry Seymour (c. 1503 – 5 April 1578) of Marwell, Hampshire, was an English landowner and MP, the brother of Jane Seymour, queen consort of Henry VIII, and consequently uncle to Edward VI. He was created a Knight of the Bath at his nephew's coronation in 1547.

== Family ==
Born around 1503, probably at Wulfhall, Wiltshire, he was the third son of Sir John Seymour and Margery Wentworth. His family rose to prominence following his sister Jane's marriage to the King in 1536. As well as Queen Jane, Henry Seymour's siblings included Elizabeth Seymour, Lady Cromwell, the daughter-in-law of Henry VIII's chief minister, Thomas Cromwell; Edward Seymour, 1st Duke of Somerset, who was Lord Protector of England during the minority of their nephew; and Thomas Seymour, 1st Baron Seymour of Sudeley, the fourth husband of Catherine Parr, and stepfather to the future Elizabeth I.

== Career ==
Seymour may have begun his career in the service of Richard Foxe, Bishop of Winchester. By 1526 he had followed his father and siblings into royal service, although he does not seem to have shared the ambitions or abilities of his brothers, Edward and Thomas, and did not progress at court. He served under four Tudor monarchs, although for the most part, he lived in relative obscurity and did not seek honours and preferments.

He held a number of offices, including:

- Keeper, Taunton Castle, Somerset by 1526–1578
- Keeper, Bridgwater Castle, Somerset 1544
- Keeper, Marwell park, Hampshire by 1547–51
- Sewer extraordinary, the chamber by 1533
- Bailiff, manor of Hampstead Marshall, Berkshire 1536–1578
- Bailiff, Romsey, Hampshire by 1546–1578
- Steward, manors of Bierton with Broughton, Whaddon and Wendover, Buckinghamshire 1536, Wyrardisbury, Buckinghamshire and Kings Langley, Hertfordshire 1536–39
- General–receiver, manors of Bierton with Broughton, Claydon, Swanbourne, Wendover and Whaddon, Buckinghamshire, Berkhampstead, Hertfordshire and Finmere, Oxfordshire 1536–10
- Captain Lyon of Hamburgh 1544
- Carver, household of Anne of Cleves 1540
- Carver, household of Catherine Parr by 1544
- Commissioner, relief, Hampshire 1550
- Commissioner, goods of churches and fraternities 1553
- Justice of the Peace 1554–1578
- Sheriff, Hampshire 1568–9

He was, presumably, the Henry Semer who was Katherine of Aragon's carver. In 1536 he appears to have replaced Mark Smeaton in the privy chamber and following his sister's marriage, he was appointed to several offices chiefly related to the administration of her estates, some of which he lost at her death. Jane left him "several valuable chains" in her will in 1537. He was carver in the households of Anne of Cleves (1540) and Katherine Parr (1545). The queen's jewels were placed in his custody in November 1541 following Katherine Howard's arrest. In 1544 he was made captain of the ship Lyon of Hamburgh under the command of his brother Thomas, Lord High Admiral, but was held to be culpable when in November it foundered in the Dart estuary during a storm. He was offered no further military or naval command following this incident, and some time in 1545, lost his position in the household of Katherine Parr.

He was made a Knight of the Bath on 20 February 1547, at his nephew's coronation, one of the "forty Knights of the Bath: who being created with so great royalty, were commanded to pay the duties of money to the Heralds, double to the same payable by other Knights." In the autumn of 1547, he was elected MP for Hampshire. He is not mentioned in the diaries of Edward VI, although he received a number of royal grants of land during the reign of his nephew. While both his brothers were executed after conspiring against their rivals in their struggles for power, Henry Seymour appears unscathed. In 1549, his brother, Edward, Lord Protector of England, wrote to him and asked him to bring troops to support him. It seems Henry Seymour did not respond, and did well under the administration of his brother's replacement, John Dudley, 1st Duke of Northumberland. He was the sole executor of his mother's Will following her death on 18 October 1550, by which she bequeathed "various legacies of plate, jewels etc. to her relations." In 1551, he was granted the manors of Marwell and Twyford, which had constituted a portion of the estates of the bishopric of Winchester, and the following year, grants for life of the manors of Somerford and Hurn, in the parish of Christchurch, with other lands to the value of £202 6s. 9d.

During the reign of Elizabeth I, he was High Sheriff of Hampshire for 1568–69.

== Marriage and issue ==
In around 1559, Seymour married Barbara Wolfe (d. 1578), daughter of Morgan Wolfe and Gwenllian, daughter of John de Barri, and by her had three sons and seven daughters, of whom:

- Sir John Seymour married Susan, youngest daughter of Lord Chidiock Powlett, third son of William Paulet, 1st Marquess of Winchester and Elizabeth, daughter of Sir William Capel, Lord Mayor of London. They had three sons:

- Edward Seymour
- Henry Seymour
- Thomas Seymour

- Jane Seymour (died February 1634) married Sir John Rodney (c. 1551 – 6 August 1612) of Stoke Rodney, Somersetshire. They had sixteen children, of whom four sons and three daughters survived including:

- Elizabeth Rodney
- Sir Edward Rodney (1590–1657) married Frances Southwell, the daughter of Sir Robert Southwell of Woodrising, Norfolk and Lady Elizabeth Howard, and by her had thirteen children.
- George Rodney (1608–1630) who married Anna Lake and had issue. He was the ancestor of George Brydges Rodney, 1st Baron Rodney (1718 – 24 May 1792)
- William Rodney (1610–1669) who married Alice Caesar and had issue.

== Death ==
Seymour died at home in Winchester on 5 April 1578. He had made his will a week earlier. He was succeeded by his son and heir, John.
