= John VI Lisle =

Member of the Parliament of England

Arms of Lisle of Wootton, Isle of Wight: Or, on a chief azure three lions rampant of the first

Sir John VI Lisle (1406–1471) was an English landowner, soldier, administrator, and politician from Wootton on the Isle of Wight.

== Origins ==
Born about 1406, he was the son and heir of the MP Sir John V Lisle and his wife Margaret Bramshott, daughter of John Bramshott. Prominent since the time of King Stephen on the Isle of Wight, then part of Hampshire, the Lisle family wrote their name in Latin as “de Insula” and in French as “de l'Isle”, both meaning “of the Island”. As well as supplying Sheriffs and MPs for the county, two of his ancestors had been summoned to Parliament as barons under King Edward I.

== Career ==
By 1427 he reached majority, in that year being first included in the electoral roll for Hampshire and in 1433 being elected as the county's Member of Parliament. Knighted in 1436, he served as Sheriff of Wiltshire in 1438 and then as Sheriff of Hampshire in 1439. From 1440 to 1470 he was appointed to at least 40 royal commissions in Hampshire and sat as a justice of the peace for the county from 1441 until his death.

After military service in the Duke of Somerset's expedition that sailed to France in 1443, he returned to England and in 1448 acquired the wardship of John Philpot, who he married to one of his daughters. After serving a second term as MP for Hampshire in the Parliament of February 1449, he went back to the war in France, serving in 1453 as a King's knight in Aquitaine with a force of 20 spearmen and 200 archers. In 1461 he rallied to Yorkist rule and, pardoned with other Lancastrians in 1462, then served on Yorkist royal commissions.

He made his will on 21 October 1468, asking to be buried at Thruxton in Hampshire, and died on 21 January 1471, leaving to his son lands in the Isle of Wight, Wiltshire, Dorset, and Devon. His will was proved on 6 November 1471.

== Family ==
He married Anne Botreaux, daughter and heiress of John Botreaux and niece of William VI Botreaux, 3rd Baron Botreaux, with whom he had the four children named in his will:

- Sir Nicholas Lisle, who married Elizabeth Rogers.
- Margaret Lisle, who married John Rogers.
- Elizabeth Lisle, who married John Philpot (one of his executors).
- Anne Lisle, who became a nun at Amesbury Priory.

After his first wife's death, he married Isabel, widow of Richard Horne and mother of Gervase Horne (born about 1454), who survived him and acted as one of his executors. They had two children named in his will:

- Jane Lisle.
- William Lisle.

She married a third time to Thomas Beauchamp and died on 7 October 1484.
