= Richard Wallop (judge) =

English judge

Richard Wallop (1616–1697) was an English judge.

== Life ==
Wallop was baptized at Bugbrooke in Northamptonshire on 10 June 1616. He was the son of John Wallop (d.1655) and his wife Margery daughter of Gerard Hawtayne of Easington, Oxfordshire and Grandson of Richard Wallop of Bugbrooke, and of Mary his wife, sister and coheiress of William Spencer of Everdon, Northamptonshire. His grandfather was the third son of Sir Oliver Wallop of Farleigh-Wallop, and younger brother of Sir Henry Wallop.

Richard Wallop the younger matriculated at Pembroke College, Oxford, on 10 October 1634, and graduated B.A. on 2 June 1635. He was called to the bar by the Middle Temple in February 1646, and became a bencher in 1666. In 1673 he was treasurer of the Middle Temple. His political views were anti-royalist, and he was frequently retained against the government in state trials during the reigns of Charles II and James II. He was counsel for William Petre, 4th Baron Petre when the articles of impeachment were brought up against the five lords concerned in the Popish Plot in April 1679. In October 1680 he acted for Sir Oliver Butler in his legal case against the king, and in March 1681 for James, Duke of York, indicted for recusancy. On this occasion he moved that the trial might be put off till Easter, alleging that the accused might then have a plea of conformity. This was granted.

He was leading counsel for William Howard, 1st Viscount Stafford, when brought to trial on 4 December 1680. As counsel for the prisoner, he spoke (7 May 1681) in support of the plea in abatement in the case of Edward Fitzharris. He was one of the counsel for the Henry Danvers, 1st Earl of Danby when brought to the court of king's bench from the Tower of London on 4 February 1684. He defended Laurence Braddon and Hugh Speke in February 1684, and argued for arrest of judgment, in the case of Thomas Rosewell on 27 November 1684. He was counsel for Baxter at his trial in February 1685, and in the same month was assigned counsel for Titus Oates, when pleading ‘not guilty’ to the two indictments against him for perjury. He also acted as counsel for the plaintiff in the case of Arthur Godden v. Sir Edward Hales, in an action for debt upon the test act in June 1686. He was constantly incurring the displeasure of Judge Jeffreys, who never lost an opportunity of browbeating him.

Wallop was made cursitor baron of the exchequer on 16 March 1696, and died on 22 August 1697. He was buried in the Temple church on the 26th. In his will, proved on 28 August 1697, he left all his property to his widow Marie, with the care of his daughter and her children.
