= Henry Popham =

English landowner, administrator and politician

Henry Popham (about 1339 – 17 June 1418) was an English landowner, administrator and politician from Popham in Hampshire.

== Origins ==
Born about 1339, he was the second known son of Sir John Popham and his wife Sibyl St Martin, his elder brother being Laurence Popham and his younger brother Sir John Popham MP. From before 1200 the family had held lands at Popham, which he inherited after the deaths of his father and his elder brother.

== Career ==
His career began in 1363 with service in Ireland under Sir William Windsor, but thereafter all his public activities were in England. In 1377 he was appointed to the first of many royal commissions in Hampshire and adjoining counties and in 1380 was a tax assessor for Hampshire. Between February 1383 and October 1404, he was elected seven times as MP for Hampshire. Also appointed High Sheriff of Hampshire for 1388–89, he later served as a JP for the county.

During his career he amassed considerable landholdings which yielded him a significant income. To his paternal lands inherited in 1360, he added in 1386 half the rights of his deceased uncle Sir Laurence St Martin MP, who had extensive properties in Dorset, Hampshire, and Wiltshire. His first marriage brought him rights in Wiltshire, increased by his second marriage with holdings in Essex. He also obtained, presumably by purchase, property in the New Forest.

He died on 17 June 1418, and was buried at St Thomas's church in Lymington. He left a will dated 6 November 1417 that was proved on 22 June 1418, and an inquisition post mortem has survived.

== Family ==
Before 1377 he married Joan, probable daughter of John Frank and his wife, who was a daughter of John Aucher, holder of lands at Bickton in Hampshire and at Fisherton Anger, now part of Salisbury in Wiltshire, and his wife Margaret. They had one son, his heir Stephen Popham MP.

By 1402, Joan had died and he was married to Margaret James, who was the widow of Richard Mewes, who held land at Beauchamp Roding in Essex, and the daughter of John James, owner of Rush Court at Wallingford then in Berkshire, and his wife Christine Anstey, daughter of John Anstey who held land at Clapcot in Brightwell-cum-Sotwell. They had two sons, one being John Popham who died before his mother. Margaret outlived her husband by nearly 30 years, dying on 11 June 1448.
