= Sir Richard Cotton =

Courtier in the court of Henry VIII

Sir Richard Cotton (in or before 1497 – 1556), was a courtier in the court of Henry VIII of England. He came from Shropshire and began his career as a lawyer before entering the king's service. His elder brother George Cotton was in charge of the household of the king's son Henry, Duke of Richmond at Sheriff Hutton Castle, and Richard served there as comptroller. The king granted him property in Bedhampton, Hampshire and Bourne, Lincolnshire. He became privy councillor in May 1552. He was knight of the shire for Hampshire in 1553 and Cheshire in 1554.
