= John Bettesthorne =

English politician

John Bettesthorne (c. 1329 – 6 February 1399) of Bisterne, Hampshire and Chaddenwick in Mere, Wiltshire, was an English politician.

He was a member (MP) of the parliament of England for Wiltshire in February 1388 and for Hampshire in January 1390.
