= Richard Wallop (MP) =

English politician

Richard Wallop (died c. 1435), of Nether Wallop, Hampshire, was an English politician.

He was a member (MP) of the parliament of England for Hampshire in December 1421.
