= John Lisle (died 1429) =

Member of the Parliament of England

Arms of Lisle of Wootton, Isle of Wight: Or, on a chief azure three lions rampant of the first

John V Lisle (c. 1386 – 17 February 1429), of Wootton, Isle of Wight was a Member of Parliament for Hampshire in 1417 and 1422. The son and heir of Sir John IV Lisle, he was the father of Sir John VI Lisle. Although he is not widely remembered for political or military achievements, his life is notable for its relative seclusion, legal disputes, and inheritance of significant estates. His career was primarily focused on the management of his lands and involvement in local affairs, rather than active participation in military or government roles. This article outlines his life and legacy, broken down into distinct stages.

== Early life and inheritance ==
John Lisle was born around 1386, the son of William Lisle, a prominent landowner. Lisle’s early life was marked by the death of his father in 1408, when John was approximately 22 years old. Upon his father's death, he inherited a substantial portion of the family estates, though he only received seisin (legal possession) of two-thirds of the lands. His mother retained her dower lands, which were located in Hampshire, Dorset, and Berkshire. Despite this, John’s holdings were considerable, with properties mainly on the Isle of Wight and in Wiltshire, which were valued at £126 6s. 8d. annually by 1412.

== Lease of herbage and legal disputes ==
One of the key legacies John inherited from his father was a lease granted in 1402 for the herbage (rights to grazing) at Hippenscombe, situated within the royal forests of Savernake and Chute. This lease, which had originally been set for ten years, was renewed in his favor in 1411 for an additional decade. However, in 1412, a dispute arose concerning this lease. Humphrey of Lancaster, later Duke of Gloucester, claimed that the herbage at Hippenscombe was part of the forest of Savernake, a territory granted to him in 1403. Humphrey's rights were upheld, and Lisle’s lease was revoked. Additionally, Sir William Sturmy, another rival, contested Lisle's rights to the herbage, citing his family's longstanding tenure of the area. However, Lisle’s rights over the nearby forest of Chute were never challenged, and he continued to serve as its hereditary warden.

== Life and role in local affairs ==
Lisle's life was largely characterized by a degree of seclusion, in stark contrast to the more active and politically engaged life of his father. Despite being named in 1420 by the Council as one of the gentry considered capable of defending the realm, Lisle did not pursue a military career. He was largely absent from public office, never serving as a justice of the peace (J.P.) and participating only minimally in commissions. Lisle did briefly serve as sheriff, a role in which he was responsible for overseeing the Hampshire elections of 1413. Additionally, he attended several hustings (election gatherings) held in Winchester in the years 1419, 1423, 1426, and 1427, though his political involvement remained limited.

== Later life and death ==
John Lisle died on 17 February 1429, apparently in London, just two days after making his will. His final bequests included instructions for his burial in the church of St. Nicholas at Chute, and a small donation of 3s. 4d. to St. Benedict’s Church at Baynard’s Castle on the Thames. Lisle's will also made provisions for his family, including his widow and six children—five sons and three daughters. His eldest son, also named John, was to receive his best horse, while the remaining children were left over 200 sheep and seven cows.

== Legacy and succession ==
Though John Lisle did not achieve significant renown during his lifetime, his legacy continued through his children. His eldest son, John Lisle Jr., would go on to have a much more active career. The younger John was knighted and served as a Member of Parliament for Hampshire in 1433 and 1449. He also married into the prominent family of William, Lord Botreaux, further enhancing the family's standing.
