= Marwell College =

Former Catholic college of secular priests

Coordinates: 50.993°N 1.278°W

Marwell College was a college of secular priests in Marwell Park, Owslebury, Hampshire, England.

Marwell was sometimes spelled Merwell or Merewell.

The college was founded by Bishop Henry of Blois (1129-1171) in the church or chapel he had built in Marwell Park. The church was dedicated to St. Stephen, St. Lawrence, St. Vincent and St. Quintin. Houses and other buildings were erected beside the church for four priests, "who should there continuously pray for the King of England and the Bishops of Winchester, and for other benefactors and faithful Christians". Bishop Blois endowed the college with £13 of rents at Twyford, divided as 60s. to each chaplain and 20s. for the ornaments and lights of the church.

In 1226, Bishop Peter des Roches added a deacon to the foundation and a gift of 50 quarters of grain and four cartloads of hay annually from the rector of Bishopstoke. He also laid down rules for the governance of the chaplains on a collegiate basis:

The four priests were annually to choose one of their number to act as prior, to whom due obedience was to be paid both within and without the church; no one was to be absent from the saying of the canonical hours, or from their common meals, or at night time, without the prior's special leave; no one was to be granted longer leave than eight days by the prior; if more was desired the bishop's licence was to be sought; any one guilty of incontinence or any other serious fault, or even if suspected, was to be expelled without hope of restitution; surplices and black copes were to be worn in the quire; the Sarum use was to be followed from mattins to compline; and of the £12 for stipend of Bishop Blois, £1 was to be assigned to each for clothes, and the remaining £8 were to be spent for common purposes by the prior with the advice of his brethren.

Bishop Henry Woodlock (1305-1316), who was born at Marwell, added further to the property of the college, but the endowments were not sufficient to keep up with inflation and by the time of the Valor Ecclesiasticus (1535) the college was termed a chantry and could support only two priests. The college was suppressed and it, along with the episcopal estate and manor house of Marwell, became the property of Sir Henry Seymour.
