= Nicholas Dabrichecourt =

English politician (died 1400)

Sir Nicholas Dabrichecourt (died 20 May 1400) was an English politician. He sat as MP for Hampshire in 1399. He was knighted circa 1377.

He also served as constable of Nottingham Castle by July 1373 till 28 October 1377, Keeper of Caversham Park from 26 November 1375 until circa 1377, Chief forester of Sherwood Forest from 9 October 1376 until 28 October 1377, sheriff of Hampshire from 15 November 1389 until 7 November 1390 and the commissioner of inquiry at Berkshire in February 1390 for wastes at Stratfield Saye priory and in May 1390 for unlawful disseisin.

== Family ==
He was the son of Sir Sanchet D'Abrichecourt, an immigrant to England from Hainault who was a member of the Order of the Garter, and the brother of Sir John Dabrichecourt. By 1370, he married Elizabeth (died September 1404), the daughter and heiress of Sibyl, daughter and heiress of Sir Thomas Say and the widow of Sir Thomas St. Leger. With her, he had three sons.
