= Stephen Popham (English MP) =

English politician

Sir Stephen Popham (about 1386 – 12 November 1444), whose ancestral lands were at Popham in Hampshire was an English soldier, administrator and politician.

Popham was the son and heir of Henry Popham, Member of Parliament for Hampshire. He fought in France in 1415 with his cousin, Sir John Popham under Edward, Duke of York on the right wing of Henry V's army at Agincourt. He was knighted by 1418, possibly on the field at Agincourt. He was elected MP for Hampshire five times (1420, 1423, 1425, 1431 and 1442). He also served on a number of commissions and was selected High Sheriff of Hampshire between 1427–28 and 1440–41, and High Sheriff of Wiltshire between 1434 and 1435.

== Family ==
Popham married twice and had four daughters. His estates passed to his daughters, whilst those entailed passed to his cousin and fellow soldier, Sir John Popham. His daughter, Elizabeth, married Sir John Wadham of Merryfield and Edge.
