= John Lisle (died 1408) =

Member of the Parliament of England

Arms of Lisle of Wootton, Isle of Wight: Or, on a chief azure three lions rampant of the first

Sir John IV Lisle (1366–1408), of Wootton in the Isle of Wight and Thruxton in Hampshire was a Member of Parliament for Hampshire in 1401 and January 1404. He was the father of the MP John Lisle.

monumental brass of Sir John Lisle (1366–1408) in Thruxton church, Hampshire
