= Hampshire (constituency) =

- Former county constituency for the House of Commons
- County: Hampshire

1295–1832
- Seats: Two
- Replaced by: North Hampshire and South Hampshire

Hampshire was a county constituency of the Parliament of England, Great Britain and after 1801 Parliament of the United Kingdom, which returned two Knights of the Shire (Members of Parliament) to the House of Commons from 1295 until 1832. (Officially, the name was The County of Southampton, and it was occasionally referred to as Southamptonshire.)

== History ==
The constituency consisted of the historic county of Hampshire, including the Isle of Wight. (Although Hampshire contained a number of parliamentary boroughs, each of which elected two MPs in its own right, these were not excluded from the county constituency, and owning property within the borough could confer a vote at the county election. This was even the case for the town of Southampton; although Southampton had the status of a county in itself after 1447, unlike most cities and towns with similar status, its freeholders were not barred from voting at county elections.)

As in other county constituencies, the franchise between 1430 and 1832 was defined by the Forty Shilling Freeholder Act, which gave the right to vote to every man who possessed freehold property within the county valued at £2 or more per year for the purposes of land tax; it was not necessary for the freeholder to occupy his land, nor even in later years to be resident in the county at all. In the 18th century, the electorate amounted to around 5,000 voters.

Uniquely for a county constituency before the Reform Act, elections in Hampshire were held at two polling places, the poll being first opened at Winchester and then, once all the mainland voters had been polled, adjourning to Newport for the convenience of the Isle of Wight voters. This concession, however, only slightly mitigated the difficulties caused by voters having to travel to the county town to exercise their franchise.

IX. Poll for Knights of Shire for County of Southampton; adjourned from Winchester to Newport.
Provided alsoe and be itt enacted by the Authority aforesaid That the Sheriffe of the County of Southampton or his Deputy att the Request of one or more of the Candidates for Election of a Knight or Knights for that County shall adjourne the Poll from Winchester after every Freeholder then and there present is polled to Newport in the Isle of Wight for the ease of the Inhabitants of the said Island Any thing in this Act contained to the contrary notwithstanding. — Parliamentary Elections Act 1695

Parliament Act 1780
- Act of Parliament
- Parliament of Great Britain
- Long title: An Act for holding the ensuing Election of a Knight of the Shire for the County of Southampton, at the Town of New Alresford, in the said County.
- Citation: 20 Geo. 3. c. 1
- Territorial extent: Great Britain

Dates
- Royal assent: 7 December 1779
- Commencement: 25 November 1779 (Note: Retrospectively commenced from the start of the session of Parliament.)
- Repealed: 21 August 1871
Other legislation
Amended by	Parliament Act 1781
Repealed by	Statute Law Revision Act 1871
Relates to	Parliamentary Elections Act 1734

Status: Repealed

Text of statute as originally enacted

Parliament (No. 2) Act 1780
- Act of Parliament
- Parliament of Great Britain
- Long title: An Act for exempting the City of Winchester, the County of Southampton, the Town of Shrewsbury, and the County of Salop, out of the Provisions of an Act, made in the Eighth Year of the Reign of His late Majesty King George the Second, intituled, "An Act for regulating the Quartering of Soldiers during the Time of the Elections of Members to serve in Parliament," so far as the same relates to the Removal of Troops during the Elections of Members to serve in Parliament, for a limited Time.
- Citation: 20 Geo. 3. c. 50
- Territorial extent: Great Britain

Dates
- Royal assent: 23 June 1780
- Commencement: 25 November 1779
- Expired: 18 July 1781 (Note: The act expired at the end of the subsequent session of Parliament.)
- Repealed: 21 August 1871
Other legislation
Amended by	Parliament Act 1781; Parliament (No. 1) Act 1782
Repealed by	Statute Law Revision Act 1871
Relates to	Parliamentary Elections Act 1734

Status: Repealed

Text of statute as originally enacted

Parliament Act 1781
- Act of Parliament
- Parliament of Great Britain
- Long title: An Act for continuing an Act, made in the Twentieth Year of the Reign of His present Majesty, intituled, "An Act for exempting the City of Winchester, the County of Southampton, the Town of Shrewsbury, and the County of Salop, out of the Provisions of an Act made in the Eighth Year of the Reign of His late Majesty King George the Second, intituled, 'An Act for regulating the Quartering of Soldiers during the Time of Elections of Members to serve in Parliament,' so far as the same relates to the Removal of Troops during the Elections of Members to serve in Parliament, for a limited Time."
- Citation: 21 Geo. 3. c. 43
- Territorial extent: Great Britain

Dates
- Royal assent: 19 June 1781
- Commencement: 31 October 1780
- Expired: 11 July 1782
- Repealed: 21 August 1871
Other legislation
Amends	Parliament (No. 2) Act 1780
Repealed by	Statute Law Revision Act 1871
Relates to	Parliamentary Elections Act 1734

Status: Repealed

Text of statute as originally enacted

Parliament (No. 1) Act 1782
- Act of Parliament
- Parliament of Great Britain
- Long title: An Act for further continuing an Act made in the Twentieth Year of the Reign of His present Majesty, intituled, "An Act for exempting the City of Winchester, the County of Southampton, the Town of Shrewsbury, and the County of Salop, out of the Provisions of an Act made in the Eighth Year of the Reign of His late Majesty King George the Second, intituled, 'An Act for regulating the Quartering of Soldiers during the Time of the Elections of Members to serve in Parliament;' so far as the same relates to the Removal of Troops during the Elections of Members to serve in Parliament for a limited Time."
- Citation: 22 Geo. 3. c. 29
- Territorial extent: Great Britain

Dates
- Royal assent: 17 May 1782
- Commencement: 27 November 1781
- Expired: 20 May 1784 (Note: Expired at the conclusion of peace with France, Spain and Holland: this occurred with the signing of the Treaty of Paris in 1784 ending the Fourth Anglo-Dutch War.)
- Repealed: 21 August 1871
Other legislation
Amends	Parliament (No. 2) Act 1780
Repealed by	Statute Law Revision Act 1871

Status: Repealed

Text of statute as originally enacted

During the American Revolutionary War, elections from 1779 to the 1783 Peace of Paris were in New Alresford instead of Winchester, because the existing law, the Parliamentary Elections Act 1734, (8 Geo. 2. c. 30) would have required soldiers stationed at Winchester to depart during the election, leaving French and Spanish prisoners of war unguarded, and the Parliamentary Elections Act 1695 (7 & 8 Will. 3. c. 25) required the sheriff to hold county elections "att the most publick and usuall Place of Election within the said County". The 1779 election was moved with the consent of the candidates. Subsequently, the law was changed to require such a move, first by the Parliament Act 1780 (20 Geo. 3. c. 1), which applied to the December 1779 by-election; then in preparation for the 1780 general election by section 2 of the Parliament (No. 2) Act 1780 (20 Geo. 3. c. 50), which was continued by the Parliament Act 1781 (21 Geo. 3. c. 43) and by the Parliament (No. 1) Act 1782 (22 Geo. 3. c. 29).

Up to Elizabethan times, at least, the voters had to contend with these difficulties themselves: Neale quotes an allusion to Hampshire freeholders "fasting and far from home" at a by-election in 1566 as evidence that the practice of feeding the voters to encourage their attendance was not yet universal. But later it became normal for voters to expect the candidates for whom they voted to meet their expenses in travelling to the poll and to entertain them generously when they reached it, making the cost of a contested election almost prohibitive in a county as large as Hampshire. When the prime minister Lord North sent £2,000 of the King's money to assist the government candidates fighting an election in Hampshire in 1779, he wrote to the King that it "bore ... a very small part of the expense" – yet it was insufficient to win the election, one of the government candidates being defeated.

Contested elections were therefore generally rare, potential candidates preferring to canvass support beforehand and usually not insisting on a vote being taken unless they were confident of winning; although there was a contest at each of the four general elections from 1705 to 1713, at all but four of the remaining 23 general elections before 1832, Hampshire's two MPs were elected unopposed.

Hampshire elections may have been less corrupt than most, and the 19th-century chronicler of electoral abuses in the Unreformed Parliament, Thomas Oldfield, notes of the constituency that "We do not find a single petition [since 1640] complaining of an undue election in this county!!!" – complete with three exclamation marks. In the 18th and early 19th century, Hampshire's voters were consistently of a High Tory persuasion, and throughout the 18th century the county's MPs were almost invariably nominees of the Crown. This influence arose in particular because of the number of government employees (in the dockyards at Portsmouth and Gosport, the forts of the Isle of Wight, and customs-houses all along the coast), as well as the Crown's tenants in the New Forest. Hampshire sentiments seem nevertheless to have been strongly in favour of reforming the House of Commons (views, no doubt, fuelled by the presence of several notorious rotten boroughs in the county), and on several occasions it submitted substantial petitions to Parliament in favour of the Reform Bill or of earlier unsuccessful proposals along the same lines.

According to the 1831 census, at around the time of the Great Reform Act, Hampshire had a population of approximately 315,000. From 1832 the Reform Act split the constituency into three, giving the Isle of Wight a single member of its own and dividing the remainder of the county into two two-member divisions, Northern Hampshire and Southern Hampshire. (There were also minor changes to the parliamentary boundary between Hampshire and Sussex.)

== Members of Parliament ==
=== MPs 1295–1640 ===
Parliament	First member	Second member
1336–1344	John de Hampton	
1346	John de Pounde	
1362	Thomas de Hampton	
1364	Sir Thomas Foxle	
1369	Sir Bernard Brocas	
1371	Sir Bernard Brocas	
1372	Sir Thomas Foxle	
1373	Sir Bernard Brocas	
1380 (Jan)	Sir Bernard Brocas	
1380 (Nov)	Sir Bernard Brocas	
1383 (Feb)	Henry Popham	
1384 (Apr)	William Sturmy	
1385	Henry Popham	
1386	Sir Bernard Brocas	Sir John Sandys
1388 (Feb)	Sir Thomas Worting	Henry Popham
1388 (Sep)	Sir Thomas Worting	Henry Popham
1390 (Jan)	Sir John Sandys	John Bettesthorne
1390 (Nov)	Sir William Sturmy	Henry Popham
1391	Sir John Sandys	Robert Cholmley
1393	Sir Bernard Brocas	Sir John Sandys
1394	Henry Popham	John Hampton
1395	Sir Bernard Brocas	Robert Cholmley
1397 (Jan)	Sir John Popham	Robert Cholmley
1397 (Sep)	Robert More	Robert Cholmley
1399	Sir Thomas Skelton	Sir Nicholas Dabrichecourt
1401	Sir John Lisle	Robert Cholmley
1402	Sir John Popham	Edward Cowdray
1404 (Jan)	Sir John Lisle	Sir John Popham
1404 (Oct)	Henry Popham	
1406	Sir John Berkeley	Sir Thomas Skelton
1407	Sir John Popham	William Fauconer
1410		
1411	John Uvedale	William Fauconer
1413 (Feb)		
1413 (May)	John Uvedale	John Arnold
1414 (Apr)	Sir Walter Sandys	William Brocas of The Vine
1414 (Nov)	Lewis John	Thomas Wallop
1415	William Brocas of The Vine	John Harris
1416 (Mar)	Bernard Brocas of Bradley	John Uvedale
1416 (Oct)		
1417	Edward Cowdray	John Lisle
1419	John Uvedale	Thomas Wallop
1420	Sir Stephen Popham	John Kirkby
1421 (May)	John Uvedale	Robert Dingley
1421 (Dec)	William Brocas of The Vine	Richard Wallop
1422	William Brocas of the Vine	John Lisle
1423	Sir Stephen Popham	Edward Cowdray
1425	Sir Stephen Popham	
1426	Sir John Boys	
1431	Sir Stephen Popham	
1432	John Hampton	
1433	Sir John VI Lisle	
1439	Sir John Popham	
1442	Sir Stephen Popham	
1449	Sir John VI Lisle	
1449	Sir John Popham	
1510–1523	No names known	
1529	Sir William Paulet	Sir Richard Sandys
1536		
1539	Thomas Wriothesley	Richard Worsley
1542	Thomas Wriothesley	Sir Thomas Lisle
1545		
1547	Sir Henry Seymour	Thomas White
1553 (Mar)	Sir Richard Cotton	?
1553 (Oct)	Sir Thomas White	Nicholas Tichborne
1554 (Apr)	Sir Thomas White	Sir John Mason
1554 (Nov)	Sir Thomas White	John Norton
1555	Sir Thomas White	John Norton
1558	Sir Thomas White	Sir John Mason
1558–9	Sir John Mason	Sir Thomas White
1562 (Dec)	Sir John Mason, died and replaced 1566 by Sir John Berkeley	William Uvedale
1566 (Nov)	Sir Henry Wallop	
1571	Hon. Henry Radclyffe	Richard Norton
1572 (Apr)	Edward Horsey	Richard Norton
1584 (Nov)	Sir George Carey	Richard Kingsmill
1588	Sir George Carey	Thomas West
1593	Sir George Carey	Benjamin Tichborne
1597	Thomas Fleming	Richard Mill
1601	Sir Henry Wallop	Sir Edward More
1604	Sir Robert Oxenbridge	William Jephson
1614	Richard Tichborne	Sir William Uvedale
1621	Sir Henry Wallop	Sir John Jephson
1624	Sir Daniel Norton	Sir Robert Oxenbridge
1625	Robert Wallop	Henry Whitehead
1626	Sir Henry Wallop	Robert Wallop
1628	Sir Henry Wallop	Sir Daniel Norton
1629–1640	No Parliaments convened	

=== MPs 1640–1832 ===
Election	First member	First party	Second member	Second party
April 1640	Sir Henry Wallop		Richard Whitehead	
November 1640	Sir Henry Wallop (died 1642)		Richard Whitehead	
1642	Richard Norton		Richard Whitehead	

- 1653: Richard Norton; Richard Major; John Hildesley
- 1654: Richard Lord Cromwell; Richard Norton; Richard Major; John St Barbe; Robert Wallop; Francis Rivet; Edward Hooper; John Bulkeley
- 1656: Richard Lord Cromwell; William Goffe; Robert Wallop; Richard Norton; Thomas Cole ; John Bulkeley; Edward Hooper; Richard Cobb

Election	First member	First party	Second member	Second party
1659	Robert Wallop		Richard Norton	
1660	Richard Norton		John Bulkeley	
1661	Lord St John		Sir John Norton, Bt	
1675	Sir Francis Rolle		Sir John Norton, Bt	
February 1679	Edward Noel		Richard Norton	
August 1679	Lord Russell		Sir Francis Rolle	
1680	Thomas Jervoise		Sir Francis Rolle	
1681	Earl of Wiltshire	Whig	Sir Francis Rolle	
1685	Earl of Wiltshire	Whig	Viscount Campden	
January 1689	Earl of Wiltshire	Whig	Lord William Powlett	
February 1689	Earl of Wiltshire	Whig	Thomas Jervoise	
1690	Earl of Wiltshire	Whig	Richard Norton	
1691	Earl of Wiltshire	Whig	Sir Robert Henley	
1693	Earl of Wiltshire	Whig	Richard Norton	
1698	Thomas Jervoise		Richard Norton	
1701	Thomas Jervoise		Richard Chaundler	
1702	Richard Norton		George Pitt	
1705	Thomas Jervoise		Richard Chaundler	
1708	Marquess of Winchester		Viscount Woodstock	
1709	Marquess of Winchester		Thomas Jervoise	
1710	George Pitt		Sir Simeon Stuart, Bt	
1713	Thomas Lewis		Sir Anthony Sturt	
1715	George Pitt		John Wallop	
1720	George Pitt		Lord Nassau Powlett	
1722	Lord Harry Powlett		Lord Nassau Powlett	
1727	Lord Harry Powlett		Sir John Cope, Bt	
1734	Lord Harry Powlett		Edward Lisle	Tory
1741	Lord Harry Powlett		Paulet St John	
1747	Lord Harry Powlett		Francis Whithed	
1751	Lord Harry Powlett		Alexander Thistlethwayte	
1754	Marquess of Winchester		Alexander Thistlethwayte	
1759	Henry Bilson-Legge	Whig	Alexander Thistlethwayte	
1761	Henry Bilson-Legge	Whig	Sir Simeon Stuart, Bt	
1765	Sir Richard Mill, Bt		Sir Simeon Stuart, Bt	
1768	Lord Henley		Sir Simeon Stuart, Bt	
1772	Sir Henry St John, Bt	Tory	Sir Simeon Stuart, Bt	
1779	Sir Henry St John, Bt	Tory	Jervoise Clarke Jervoise	Anti-Government
1780	Robert Thistlethwayte		Jervoise Clarke Jervoise	Anti-Government
1790	Sir William Heathcote, Bt		William John Chute	
1806	Thomas Thistlethwayte		Hon. William Herbert	
1807	Sir Henry St John-Mildmay, Bt		William John Chute	
1808	Thomas Freeman-Heathcote		William John Chute	
1820	John Willis Fleming	Tory	George Purefoy-Jervoise	
1826	John Willis Fleming	Tory	Sir William Heathcote, Bt	Tory
1830	John Willis Fleming	Tory	Sir William Heathcote, Bt	Ultra-Tory
1831	Sir James Macdonald, Bt	Whig	Charles Shaw-Lefevre	Whig
1832	Sir Thomas Baring, Bt		Charles Shaw-Lefevre	Whig
1832	Constituency abolished			
