= Robert Dingley (died 1456) =

English politician

Robert Dingley (c. 1377 – 2 April 1456), of Wolverton, Hampshire, was an English politician.

He was a member (MP) of the parliament of England for Hampshire in May 1421.
