= John Arnold (MP for Hampshire) =

Member of the Parliament of England

John Arnold of Winchester (died 1433) was an English politician who was MP for Hampshire in May 1413. He also served more than eighteen years as the bailiff of Bishop Henry Beaufort.
