= Robert Corbet (died 1417) =

Member of the Parliament of England

Sir Robert Corbet (c. 1354 – 5 July 1417) was an English landowner, Member of Parliament (MP) and High Sheriff.

He was born the son and heir of Sir Robert Corbet (c. 1330 – 1404) of Kings Bromley, Staffordshire and Hadley, Shropshire. He was knighted by July 1372, after military service in France under the command of Thomas of Woodstock from June to September 1378. His chief place of residence was Assington in Suffolk. His Berkshire home was at Tubney. During his lifetime he accrued several estates by marriage.

He was made Constable of Berkhampstead castle in 1399 for life. He was a Justice of the Peace (J.P.) for Hertfordshire from 1401 to 1407. He was appointed High Sheriff of Oxfordshire and Berkshire for 1406–07 and 1410–11, High Sheriff of Wiltshire for 1408–09, and High Sheriff of Shropshire for 1413–15. During the latter term of office he was, somewhat unusually, also an MP for Suffolk.

He was elected MP for Wiltshire in 1385 and 1397, for Hertfordshire in 1402 and 1404 and twice for Suffolk in 1414.

He died in 1417. He had married three times: firstly Alice, the daughter and heiress of Sir John Langton of Hoddesdon, Hertfordshire; secondly Joan, daughter and coheir of Ralph Broc of Northchurch, Hertfordshire and the widow of Sir Peter Scudamore of Upton Scudamore, Wiltshire; and thirdly another Joan, the daughter of Sir John Thornbury and widow of both William Peyto of Chesterton, Warwickshire and John Knightley of Gnosall, Staffordshire. He was succeeded by his daughter Sibyl, wife of John Greville of Sezincote, Gloucestershire. After Greville's death in 1444, his estates passed to the son of Sir Robert's half-brother, Sir Guy Corbet.

Parliament of England
| Preceded by Sir Thomas Hungerford; Unknown | Member of Parliament for Wiltshire; 1385; With: Unknown | Succeeded by Sir Thomas Hungerford; Sir Ralph Cheyne |
| Preceded by Sir John Lilborne; John Gawen | Member of Parliament for Wiltshire; 1397; With: Sir John Roches | Succeeded by Sir Henry Green; Sir Thomas Blount |
| Preceded by Sir Thomas de la Barre; Robert Newport | Member of Parliament for Hertfordshire; 1402–1404; With: Sir John Poultney | Succeeded by Sir John Poultney; William Parker |
| Preceded by John Spencer; John Lancaster | Member of Parliament for Suffolk; 1414; With: Sir William Phelip | Unknown |
Political offices
| Preceded by Sir William Langford | High Sheriff of Berkshire and Oxfordshire; 1406–1407 | Succeeded by John Wilcotes |
| Preceded by Walter Beauchamp | High Sheriff of Wiltshire; 1408–1409 | Succeeded by William Cheyne |
| Preceded by Sir Peter Bessels | High Sheriff of Berkshire and Oxfordshire; 1410–1411 | Succeeded by Sir William Lisle |
| Preceded by John Brugge | High Sheriff of Shropshire; 1413–1415 | Succeeded by Sir Richard Lacon |
