= John Rous (Wiltshire MP) =

Member of the Parliament of England

John Rous (died c. 1454), of Baynton in Edington, Wiltshire, was a member of the English landed gentry, who fought at Agincourt in 1415, and served one term as a Member of Parliament for Wiltshire in 1420.

John Rous was the younger son of John Rous of Imber, Wiltshire, and Isolda FitzWarin of Great Chalfield, Wiltshire. When his father died in 1413, most of the property passed to his elder brother, William, but John inherited the manors of Baynton and Leigh (both in Wiltshire). He served in the retinue of Sir Walter Hungerford at the Battle of Agincourt in 1415. In 1419 he was identified by the J.P.s for Wiltshire as one of the "12 men-at-arms considered best able for military duties". In 1420 he was elected a Member of Parliament for Wiltshire, probably due to the influence of Walter Hungerford. He had no prior experience in local administration, and was not appointed to carry out any duties on behalf of the Crown.

It has been suggested that he was a promoter of Lollardism and heresy, and in 1428 he was accused of inciting the people of Edington not to pay the local vicar the customary offerings at marriages, burials and baptisms, but in 1444 Rous gave his manor of Baynton to the monastery of Bonhommes at Edington (Edington Priory).

As recounted in the Tropenell Cartulary, in 1431 he assisted his brother William in defending Great Chalfield Manor against the claims of the Beverleys. Thomas Tropenell subsequently acquired the manor, and built the manor house still standing there.

He was married twice, first, before 1439 to Joan, sister of Robert Ashley (another Member of Parliament), and second to Anne Gawen. He had no legitimate offspring but, according to Tropenell, had one illegitimate son, John, son of Joan Perot, of Cowliston (Coulston, Wiltshire).

He died some time between 1451 and 1454, and is buried, next to his first wife, in Edington Priory.
