= Bailiff of Sarum =

The Bailiff of Sarum or Bailiff of New Sarum was an official appointed by the Bishop of Salisbury in the 14th and 15th centuries.

== Bishop's Bailiff of New Sarum (Salisbury) ==
The Bishop's bailiff was appointed directly from the Bishop of Salisbury. The appointee was paid whilst in office. The Office of Bailiff of New Sarum appears to centre on a legal function associated with the Church Courts in Salisbury diocese, where jurisdiction of the bailiff was derived within the "lands, fiefs, and men of the bishop and his successors or of the dean, the canons, and their successors".

A document dated 23 March 1227, whereby King Henry III of England granted financial privileges to Bishop Richard Poore and his subsequent successors, sheds light on the responsibilities of the Bailiff of New Sarum. Within this document the King "...conceded afterwards to the aforesaid bishop and his successors that no viscount or constable or any other of our bailiffs shall have power over or the right to enter into the lands, fiefs, and men of the bishop and his successors or of the dean, the canons, and their successors, but it [power and entrance] shall pertain wholly to the bishop and his successors and to their bailiffs, with the exception of those legal attachments from the pleas of the crown."

In the case of Sir Thomas Hungerford, he also had the role of steward of the city of Salisbury and the manors of Milford and Woodford; a function described as a medieval demesne manager on behalf of the Bishop of Salisbury. It is unclear whether other incumbents had similar responsibilities.

== Known incumbents of the Office of Bishop's Bailiff of New Sarum ==
Dates shown below relate to dates as they appear on documents contained within the National Archive whilst the incumbent is in office. Only the dates corresponding to Sir Thomas de Hungerford relate to the full term served in office. The Robert Longe shown below may be Robert Long of South Wraxall.

| Name | Indicative Date |
|---|---|
| John de Hildesle | 3 November 1310 |
| Geoffrey de Weremunster | 14 April 1317 |
| William de Stourton | 15 March 1317/8 |
| Walter de Hungerford | 21 April 1333 |
| Robert de Haveresham | 9 January 1347/8 |
| John de Westbury | 26 March 1352 |
| Walter atte Bergh | Wednesday after St. Matthew (24 September) 1365 |
| Sir Thomas de Hungerford | Life grant of office, 4 April 1370 to death 3 Dec 1397 |
| William de Westbury | Earliest: Wed 11 Feb 1411 – Latest: 5 May 1418 |
| Robert Longe | Wednesday after Palm Sunday (12 April) 1430 |
| John Whittokesine | 5 Dec 1457 |
| John Fitz James | 27 January 1475/6 |
