= Peter de la Mare =

English politician (fl. 1370s)

Sir Peter de la Mare

Speaker of the House of Commons
- In office October 1377 – November 1377
- Monarch: Richard II of England
- Preceded by: Thomas Hungerford
- Succeeded by: James Pickering
- In office April 1376 – January 1377
- Monarch: Edward III of England
- Preceded by: William de Shareshull (as Prolocutor, last titleholder)
- Succeeded by: Thomas Hungerford

Sir Peter de la Mare (died after 1387) was an English politician and Speaker of the House of Commons during the Good Parliament of 1376.

== Family ==
His parents were probably Sir Reginald de la Mare (died before 1358), of Yatton and Little Hereford in Herefordshire, and his wife Margery. His younger brother Malcolm, also prominent in Herefordshire and an MP in several Parliaments, died childless. His sister Joan married Simon Brockbury and their daughter Margaret married William Seymour, having a son Roger (died 1420) who inherited his great-uncle's estates, which implies that Sir Peter died childless and may never have married.

== Life ==
Before becoming Speaker, de la Mare worked as a toll collector, was Sheriff of Herefordshire in 1374, and served as a steward to Edmund Mortimer, 3rd Earl of March. It may have been his connection with Mortimer which led to his election to Parliament.

De la Mare attended the Good Parliament in 1376 as a knight of the shire for Herefordshire. After being elected as Speaker, he served as a spokesman for the House of Commons in the House of Lords during the indictment of various figures close to King Edward III, including the king's mistress Alice Perrers, who was accused of having gained an undue degree of influence over the king. However, the political influence of the Good Parliament was brief.

In November 1376, de la Mare was imprisoned in Nottingham Castle by John of Gaunt. Despite pleas for his release, the Bad Parliament of 1377 refused to pardon him. However, he regained his freedom in June 1377, following the death of Edward III. Following his release, Mare was pardoned and compensated by King Richard II. He was re-elected as Speaker of the Commons in the Parliament of October 1377.

Peter de la Mare served in several more Parliaments during the 1380s. The last recorded mention of him was as a feoffee to Richard Burley in 1387.

== In Piers Plowman ==
Many scholars agree that the parliament of rats and mice in the prologue of Piers Plowman is a direct reference to the Good Parliament. Peter de la Mare is portrayed as the "rat of renown" who proposes belling the cat (who is probably John of Gaunt), thus casting him as a well-intentioned reformer who would not or could not follow through.

Political offices
Preceded by Sir Thomas Hungerford	Presiding Officer of the House of Commons; 1376	Succeeded by James Pickering
Preceded by Thomas Hungerford	Speaker of the House of Commons; 1377	Succeeded by Sir Thomas Hungerford
