= Wroughton (disambiguation) =

Wroughton is a village in Wiltshire, England.

Wroughton may also refer to:

- Philip Wroughton (1846–1910), English landowner and politician
- Philip Lavallin Wroughton (1933–2020), Lord Lieutenant of Berkshire, England
- Richard Wroughton (1748–1822), British actor
- Robert Charles Wroughton (1849–1921), naturalist, British India
- William Wroughton (c.1509–1559), English politician
