= Thomas Bonham =

Thomas Bonham may refer to:

- Thomas Bonham (died 1420), MP for Wiltshire
- Thomas Bonham (died 1532), MP for Essex
- Thomas Bonham (physician) (1564–c. 1628), English physician
