= Richard Horne (disambiguation) =

Richard Horne is an English rugby league footballer who played in the 1990s, 2000s and 2010s, and coach.

Richard Horne may also refer to:

- Dick Horne (1918–1964), American football player
- Richard Henry Horne (1802–1884), English poet and critic
- Richard Horne (MP), member of parliament (MP) for Wiltshire
- Richard Horne (cartoonist) (1960–2007), British author, illustrator and political cartoonist
- Richard Horne (figure skater), see United States Figure Skating Championships
- Richard Horne, a character in Twin Peaks
- Richard B. Horne, British physicist

== See also ==
- Richard Horn (disambiguation)
