= Lord Beauchamp =

Lord Beauchamp may refer to:

- Baron Beauchamp of Hache
- Baron Beauchamp de Warwick
- Baron Beauchamp of Powick
- Baron Beauchamp de Somerset
- Baron Beauchamp of Bletso
- Beauchamp, Baron St Amand
- Baron Beauchamp of Kidderminster
- Viscount Beauchamp, a subsidiary title of the Marquess of Hertford, second creation
- Viscount Beauchamp of Hache, a subsidiary title of the Duke of Somerset, first creation
- Earl Beauchamp
