= Stantor =

Stantor may refer to:

- Stantors of Horningsham, England
- Peter Stantor (died 1415), English politician, member of the Parliament of England

== See also ==
- Stanton (surname)
