= Millbourne =

Millbourne may refer to:

- Millbourne, Pennsylvania: a borough in Delaware County, Pennsylvania, United States
- Millbourne, Edmonton: a community within Mill Woods in the City of Edmonton, Alberta, Canada

== See also ==
- Milbourne (disambiguation)
