= Squire =

Shield- or armour-bearer of a knight

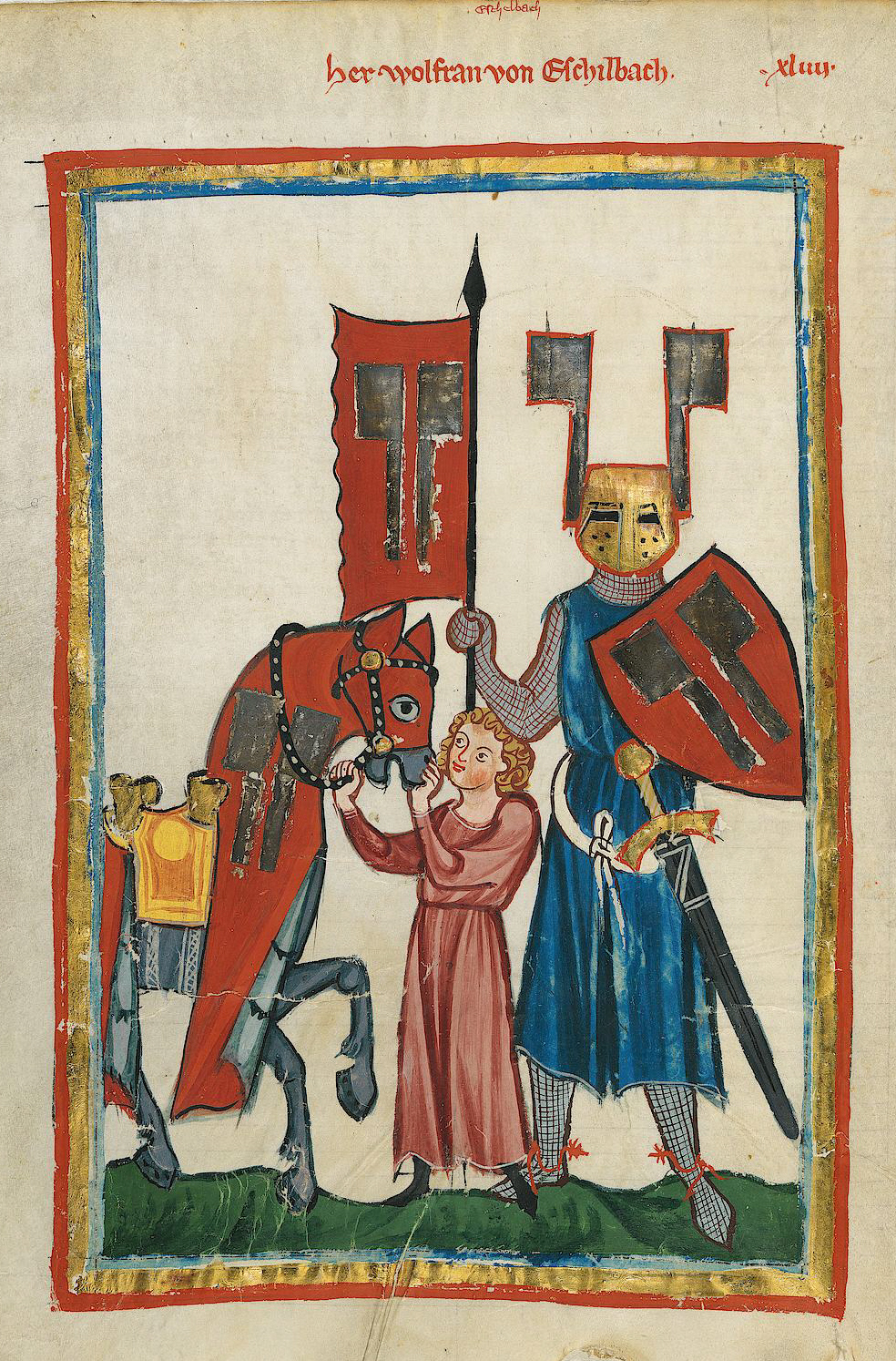
Wolfram von Eschenbach and his squire (Codex Manesse, 14th century)

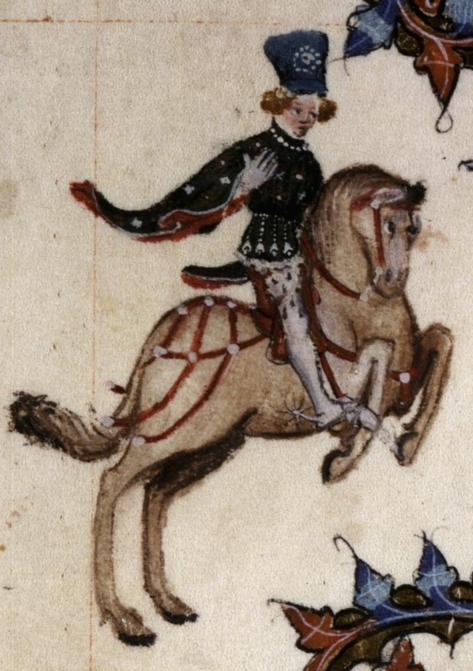
The Squire - Ellesmere Chaucer

In the Middle Ages, a squire was shield- or armour-bearer of a knight. Boys served a knight as an attendant, doing simple but important tasks, such as saddling a horse and caring for the knight's weapons and armour.

== Terminology ==
Squire is a shortened version of the word esquire, from the Anglo-French esquier ("shield bearer"). Other terms include scutifer and the Latin armiger ("arms bearer").

Use of the term evolved over time. Initially, a squire could be a knight's servant that fought with his lord. It could also refer to sub-knightly Men-at-Arms and was used interchangeably with valet. Over time it referred to a broad social class of men, just below the rank of knight. Eventually, a lord of the manor might come to be known as a "country squire".

== Duties ==
A squire was typically a young boy, training to become a knight. A boy training for knighthood might serve as a page from about the age of seven and become a squire at about fourteen. Squires were the second step to becoming a knight, after having served as a page. A squire was responsible for taking care of the horse and arms of his knight. He was to take care of the knight’s armor, ensuring it was well-maintained, cleaned, and ready for battle. This also included helping the knight put on his armor. The squire was also responsible for grooming and saddling the knight’s horses. Squires would accompany their knights into battle. Outside of battle, a squire would serve his lord by making his bed, waiting on him during meals, and carving the knight's meat. A lord with multiple squires would give each squire a specific role such as squire of the chamber.

Many squires were hired servants with no known pedigree. Despite being a servant, it was a high status job and could serve as training for future knights.

While many squires were young men who would eventually become knights, others were of too low a rank to become a knight. These squires often still owned a manor. Some squires who were capable of becoming knights remained squires, resulting in two classes of landholding squires. A third class of squire were squires based on employment, their lord providing their military equipment. All three classes were officially recognized by the tax law of 1379.

== See also ==
- Silahdar Agha

== Sources ==
- Taylor, Craig (2014). "The Squire". In Rigby, Stephen (ed.). Historians on Chaucer: The 'General Prologue' to the Canterbury Tales. Oxford: Oxford University Press. pp. 63–76. doi:10.1093/acprof:oso/9780199689545.003.0004. ISBN 9780199689545.
