= John Wroth (died 1396) =

English politician

John Wroth (died 1396), of Enfield, Middlesex and Downton, Wiltshire, was an English politician.

He was a member (MP) of the parliament of England for Middlesex in October 1382 and April 1384 and Wiltshire in November 1390.
