= Norrington Manor =

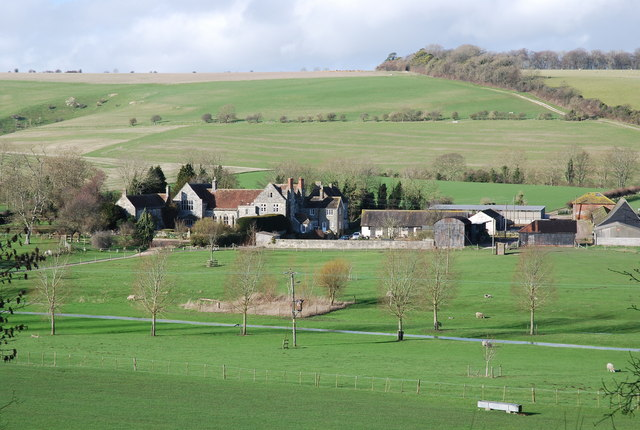
- Norrington Manor House, with farm buildings to right

- Location within Wiltshire

General information
- Location: Wiltshire, England
- Coordinates: 51.0136°N 2.0497°W
- Completed: Late 14c

Design and construction
- Architect: John Gawen
- Designations: Grade I listed building

Norrington Manor is a medieval manor house at Alvediston, about 11 miles (18 km) west-southwest of Salisbury, in the southern English county of Wiltshire. It is a Grade I listed building.

== Description ==
Pevsner describes the house as "a lucky survival". Some features house date from the late 14th century, others from the 15th, 16th, 17th and 19th centuries. The principal walls are of dressed limestone under a tiled roof with ashlar chimneys. There is a 14th-century three-bay hall (with a later roof) and a cross passage with flanking 17th-century cross wings, and a 16th-century range at the front. A 15th-century porch to the right of the main front has a pointed archway. There is a 14th-century undercroft and a 17th-century solar at the west end of the hall. Inside the hall is a Tudor-arched stone chimneypiece. In the east wing is a 17th-century newel staircase with turned balusters.

The house was designated as Grade I listed in 1966.

== Owners ==
The present house has its origins in a manor house probably built by John Gawen, a prominent local politician and magistrate, who acquired the property in 1377.

In 1658 the manor was acquired for his seat by Sir Wadham Wyndham (1609–1668), a judge of the King's Bench, 9th son of Sir John Wyndham (1558–1645) of Orchard Wyndham, Somerset. The Wyndham family made alterations to the house in the 17th century.
