= Robert Andrew (died 1437) =

English politician

Robert Andrew (died 1437), of Castle Eaton and Blunsdon St. Andrew, Wiltshire, was an English politician.

He was a member (MP) of the parliament of England for Cricklade in 1399 and for Wiltshire in March 1416, 1422, 1426 and 1433.
