= Wiltshire (UK Parliament constituency) =

Former parliamentary constituency in the United Kingdom

- Former county constituency for the House of Commons
- County: Wiltshire

1290–1832
- Seats: Two
- Replaced by: Northern Wiltshire and Southern Wiltshire

Wiltshire was a constituency of the House of Commons of England from 1290 to 1707, of the House of Commons of Great Britain from 1707 to 1800 and of the House of Commons of the United Kingdom from 1801 to 1832. It was represented by two Members of Parliament (MPs), elected by the bloc vote system.

== History ==
=== Boundaries ===
The constituency consisted of the whole historic county of Wiltshire. (Although Wiltshire contained a number of boroughs each of which elected two Members in their own right, the boroughs were not excluded from the county constituency, and owning property within a borough could confer a vote at the county election.)

=== Medieval and Tudor period ===
In medieval times, the custom in Wiltshire as elsewhere was for Members called knights of the shire to be elected at the county court by the suitors to the court, which meant the small number of nobles and other landowners who were tenants in chief of the Crown. Such county elections were held on the same day as the election of the members for the boroughs. Thus we find it recorded that in the first year of the reign of Henry V, "at a full County Court held at Wilton, Twenty-Six persons chose the Knights for the County, and the same individuals elected Two Citizens respectively for New Sarum, Old Sarum, Wilton, Devizes, Malmesbury, Marlborough and Calne."

The Forty Shilling Freeholder Act 1430 extended the right to vote to every man who possessed freehold property within the county valued for the purposes of land tax at £2 (equivalent to £1,705 in 2025) or more per year; it was not necessary for the freeholder to occupy his land, nor even in later years to be resident in the county.

Once the vote was no longer confined to the richest men in the county, voters quickly came to expect the candidates for whom they voted to meet their expenses in travelling to the poll and to entertain them when they got there. At the Wiltshire election of 1559, one of the candidates, George Penruddock, was Steward to William Herbert, 1st Earl of Pembroke: at the close of polling, Penruddock invited all the voters, as well as his opponents and the Sheriff, to a dinner at Wilton House, Lord Pembroke's seat.

County elections were held at a single polling place. In the early period this would have been wherever in the county the Sheriff chose to hold the relevant county court, but eventually there was a fixed venue, at Wilton. Voters from the rest of the county had to travel there to exercise their franchise. A detailed account survives of how this worked in the mid-Tudor period, as there was litigation over a dispute at the election of 1559 in the Court of Star Chamber. At this election there were three candidates for the two seats, but it appears that the choice for one seat was unanimous. The other was contested between George Penruddock, the Steward to the Earl of Pembroke mentioned above, a member of the previous parliament, and Sir John Thynne, who had previously represented boroughs in the county and who had just begun to build the great house at Longleat. The election proceeded by the Sheriff sitting in one place to take votes for Thynne, and his deputy sitting in another to take votes for Penruddock. There was no secret ballot at this period. Each side's agents watched the voting and had the opportunity to challenge the credentials of anyone they believed not to be a valid voter. Penruddock was the easy victor, but Thynne then challenged his election, claiming that many of his votes were invalid (which he had already had the chance to prove and had failed to do), and that Penruddock himself was ineligible, being neither resident in Wiltshire nor of sufficiently high social status to be a knight of the shire. These objections might have had more weight were he not already one of the sitting members. The Sheriff declared Penruddock elected, but afterwards Thynne's supporters quietly persuaded him to change his mind and gave him a bond for £300 (equivalent to £138,230 in 2025) to indemnify him against the consequences; he therefore sent in the return of election naming Thynne rather than Penruddock as duly elected. The size of the bond seems to have been finely judged, since when the Attorney General prosecuted the Sheriff in the Star Chamber he was fined £200 and Penruddock was awarded a further £100 in damages; but the Sheriff was also sentenced to a year's imprisonment.

=== 18th and 19th century elections ===
As time went on, the treating at elections became more elaborate and more openly corrupt, and at the same time the size of the electorate expanded considerably. In the 15th century, the forty-shilling freeholders must still have constituted a very small number of voters, but social changes and rising land values both acted eventually to broaden the franchise. Those qualified to vote were still a fraction of total population: at the time of the Great Reform Act 1832, Wiltshire had a total population of approximately 240,000, yet just 6,403 votes were cast in the county constituency at the 1818 election, the last general election at which there was a contested election in Wiltshire. This was nevertheless enough to put a substantial burden on the candidates' purses, making the cost of a contested election very high – a by-election in 1772 was said to have cost £20,000 (equivalent to £2,642,387 in 2025). Contested elections were therefore rare, potential candidates preferring to canvass support beforehand and usually not insisting on a vote being taken unless they were confident of winning; the county was contested at four of the six general elections between 1701 and 1713, but in all but one of the remaining twenty-three general elections until 1832, Wiltshire's two Members were elected unopposed.

Wiltshire was a predominantly rural county, though the freeholders from the biggest towns (Salisbury, Trowbridge, Bradford-on-Avon, Westbury and Warminster) made up almost a fifth of the vote in 1818. It succeeded in remaining independent of any domination by the local nobility and generally chose members of the county's landed gentry as its members. Wiltshire was unusual in that by the 18th century it had formalised the process of picking its candidates to some degree, the decision being made by a body called the Deptford Club (named after the inn where it met). The club consisted of leading local members of both gentry and nobility and was said to have been in existence since 1729. Once the club had met in private and made its decision, the choice was ratified at a public meeting, and only on a small number of occasions did a disappointed candidate take the matter to a formal vote at the ensuing election. However, in the last half century before Reform, two rival clubs (the Devizes Club and the Beckhampton Club) took over the nominating function, and in 1812 an independent candidate, Paul Methuen, stood against one of the nominees of the clubs and defeated him.

=== Abolition ===
Under the Great Reform Act 1832, the constituency was abolished, and the county was split into two two-member divisions for parliamentary purposes, Northern Wiltshire and Southern Wiltshire constituencies.

== Members of Parliament ==
=== 1295–1640 ===
Parliament	First member	Second member
1313	John de Vivonia	
1357	Thomas Hungerford	
1360	Thomas Hungerford	
1362	Thomas Hungerford	
1376	Sir John Delamare	
1377 (Jan)	Sir Thomas Hungerford	
1378	Sir Ralph Cheyne	Sir John Dauntsey
1379	Sir Thomas Hungerford	Sir John Dauntsey
1380 (Jan)	Sir Thomas Hungerford	
1380 (Nov)	Sir Thomas Hungerford	
1381	Sir John Roches	Sir John Dauntsey
1382 (May)	Sir John Roches	Sir John Dauntsey
1382 (Oct)	Sir John Dauntsey	
1382 (Nov)	Sir John Roches	
1383 (Feb)	Sir John Roches	
1384 (Apr)	Sir John Roches	
1385	Sir Robert Corbet	
1386	Sir Thomas Hungerford	Sir Ralph Cheyne
1388 (Feb)	Sir John Dauntsey	John Bettesthorne
1388 (Sep)	Sir Ralph Cheyne	Richard Horne
1390 (Jan)	Sir Thomas Hungerford	Sir William Sturmy
1390 (Nov)	Sir John Roches	John Wroth
1391	Sir Bernard Brocas	Robert Dingley
1393	Sir Thomas Hungerford	Sir William Sturmy
1394	Sir John Roches	John Gawen
1395	Sir John Lilborne	John Gawen
1397 (Jan)	Sir John Roches	Sir Robert Corbet
1397 (Sep)	Sir Henry Green	Sir Thomas Blount
1399	Sir William Sturmy	Sir John Roches
1401	Sir William Sturmy	Sir Walter Hungerford
1402	Sir John Berkeley	Thomas Calston
1404 (Jan)	Richard Mawarden	Peter Stantor
1404 (Oct)	Sir Walter Hungerford	William Worfton
1406	Thomas Bonham	Thomas Calston
1407	Sir Walter Hungerford	William Stourton
1410		
1411	Sir Walter Hungerford	Henry Thorpe
1413 (Feb)		
1413 (May)	Sir William Sturmy	Sir Walter Hungerford
1414 (Apr)	Sir William Moleyns	Sir Walter Hungerford
1414 (Nov)	Sir William Sturmy	Thomas Bonham
1415	William Alexander	Thomas Bonham
1416 (Mar)	Sir Walter Beauchamp	Robert Andrew
1416 (Oct)		
1417	Sir William Sturmy	John Westbury
1419	Robert Ashley	John Westbury
1420	John Persons	John Rous
1421 (May)	Robert Long	Richard Milbourne
1421 (Dec)	John Stourton	Robert Long
1422	Sir William Sturmy	Robert Andrew
1423–1424	Robert Long	
1425	John Stourton	
1426	Robert Andrew	
1429–1430	Robert Long	
1432	Sir John Stourton	
1433	Robert Andrew	
1433	Robert Long	
1435	John Seymour	
1439	John Seymour	
1442	Robert Long	Henry Green
1445	John Seymour	
1449	Henry Long	
1449	Sir John Bayntun	
1453–1454	Henry Long	
1471–1481	John Cheney	
1472–1475	Henry Long	
1477	Walter Hungerford	
1491	Sir Richard Beauchamp	
1497	Richard Elyot	
1510–1523	No names known	
1529	Sir Edward Darrell, died and replaced 1532 by Henry Long	Edward Bayntun
1536
1539	Edward Bayntun	Robert Long
1542		
1545	Thomas Seymour, 1st Baron Seymour of Sudeley	Sir William Herbert
1547	Sir William Herbert, ennobled and replaced Jan 1552 by Sir William Sharington	Sir William Wroughton
1553 (Mar)	?	Sir James Stumpe
1553 (Oct)	Sir Edward Waldegrave	Henry Long
1554 (Apr)	Sir William Wroughton	Sir John Marvyn
1554 (Nov)	Sir Walter Hungerford	Christopher Willoughby
1555	Henry Bodenham	William Basely
1558	George Penruddock	Nicholas Snell
1559 (Jan)	Sir John Thynne	John Erneley
1562–1563	Edward Bayntun	John Eyre
1571	Sir John Thynne	John Danvers
1572 (Apr)	Sir George Penruddock	James Marvyn
1584 (Nov)	Carew Raleigh	Anthony Mildmay
1586 (Oct)	William Brouncker	Carew Raleigh
1588 (Oct)	John Thynne	William Brouncker
1593	Sir Walter Long	Sir William Brouncker
1597 (Oct)	Sir William Eyre	Henry Baynton II
1601 (Sep)	Edmund Carey	Sir Edward Hungerford
1604	Sir Francis Popham	Sir John Thynne (died 1604)
1605	Sir Francis Popham	Thomas Thynne (election disallowed)
1606	Sir Francis Popham	Sir Walter Vaughan
1614	Sir Thomas Howard	Sir Henry Poole
1621	Sir Francis Seymour	Sir Edward Bayntun
1624	Edward Hungerford	Sir John St John
1625	Sir Francis Seymour	Sir Henry Ley
1626	Sir Henry Poole	Walter Long
1628	Sir William Button	Sir Francis Seymour
1629–1640	No Parliaments summoned	

=== 1640–1832 ===
Year	First member	First party	Second member	Second party
April 1640	Sir Francis Seymour	Royalist	Philip Lord Herbert	
November 1640	Sir James Thynne	Royalist	Sir Henry Ludlow	Parliamentarian
September 1642	Thynne disabled from sitting – seat vacant		Sir Henry Ludlow	Parliamentarian
1646	Hon. James Herbert		Edmund Ludlow	
December 1648	Herbert excluded in Pride's Purge – seat vacant		Edmund Ludlow	
Wiltshire had 3 representatives in the nominated Parliament of 1653 and 10 in the first two Parliaments of the Protectorate
1653	Sir Anthony Ashley Cooper, Nicholas Green, Thomas Eyre			
1654	Sir Anthony Ashley Cooper, Thomas Grove, Alexander Thistlethwaite, Alexander Popham, Francis Holles, John Ernle, William Yorke, John Norden, James Ash, Gabriel Martin			
1656	Sir Anthony Ashley Cooper, Thomas Grove, Alexander Thistlethwaite, Sir Alexander Popham, Richard Howe, Sir Walter St John, John Bulkeley, William Ludlow, Henry Hungerford, Gabriel Martin			
Representation reverted to 2 MPs in the Third Protectorate Parliament
January 1659	Sir Anthony Ashley Cooper		Sir Walter St John	
May 1659	Edmund Ludlow		One seat vacant	
1660	Sir Anthony Ashley Cooper		John Ernle	
1661	Charles Seymour		Henry Hyde	
1664	Sir James Thynne		Henry Hyde	
1670	Thomas Thynne		Henry Hyde	
1675	Thomas Thynne		Sir Richard Howe	
1679	Thomas Thynne		Sir Walter St John	
1685	Viscount Cornbury	Tory	Viscount Bruce	Tory
1689	Viscount Cornbury	Tory	Sir Thomas Mompesson	
1690	Viscount Cornbury	Tory	Sir Walter St John	
1695	Sir George Hungerford		Henry St John	
1698	Sir George Hungerford		Sir Edward Ernle	
January 1701	Sir George Hungerford		Richard Howe	
December 1701	Maurice Ashley		William Ashe	
1702	Richard Howe		Robert Hyde	
1722	Richard Howe		Richard Goddard	
1727	Sir James Long	Tory	John Ivory-Talbot	
1729	John Howe		John Ivory-Talbot	
1741	Sir Robert Long	Tory	Edward Popham	
1767	Thomas Goddard		Edward Popham	
1770	Charles Penruddocke		Edward Popham	
1772	Charles Penruddocke		Ambrose Goddard	
1788	Sir James Tylney-Long	Tory	Ambrose Goddard	
1795	Henry Penruddocke Wyndham	Whig	Ambrose Goddard	
1806	Henry Penruddocke Wyndham	Whig	Richard Godolphin Long	Tory
1812	Paul Methuen		Richard Godolphin Long	Tory
1818	Paul Methuen		William Pole-Tylney-Long-Wellesley	Tory
1819	John Benett		William Pole-Tylney-Long-Wellesley	Tory
1820	John Benett		Sir John Dugdale Astley	
1832	County divided into two constituencies			

== See also ==
- List of former United Kingdom Parliament constituencies
- Unreformed House of Commons
