= William Worfton =

English politician

Parliament of England

Personal details
- Born: 1366
- Died: 1408 (aged 41–42)
- Occupation: politician

William Worfton (c. 1366 – 1408), of Broad Hinton, Wiltshire, was an English politician.

He was a member (MP) of the parliament of England for Wiltshire in October 1404.
