= John Westbury =

English politician

John Westbury (died c. 1443), also John de Westbury or John of Westbury, of Hill Deverill, Wiltshire, was an English politician.

He was a member (MP) of the parliament of England for Wiltshire in 1417 and 1419.

His elder brother was William de Westbury.
