= Carew Raleigh =

English politician and naval commander

This article concerns Sir Walter Raleigh's brother. For his namesake and nephew, Sir Walter's son, see Carew Raleigh (1605–1666)

Sir Carew Raleigh or Ralegh (ca. 1550 – ca. 1625) was an English naval commander and politician who sat in the House of Commons at various times between 1586 and 1622. He was the elder brother of Sir Walter Raleigh.

== Biography ==
Raleigh was born in Fardel, Devon, the son of Walter Raleigh and Catherine Champernowne. He was gentleman of the horse to John Thynne of Longleat for some time before Thynne's death in 1580. In 1578, Raleigh served on the expedition led by his half-brother, Sir Humphrey Gilbert. On his marriage, he sold his property in Devon, and settled at Downton House, near Salisbury. He was Lieutenant of the Isle of Portland from 6 July 1584 until 1625. In 1584, he was elected Member of Parliament for Wiltshire. In 1586, he was on the list of sea-captains drawn up to meet the threat of a Spanish invasion together with his brother Sir Walter Raleigh and his two elder half-brothers, George and John. He was re-elected MP for Wiltshire in 1586. In 1589, he was elected MP for Ludgershall. From 1591 to 1603, he was Vice-Admiral of Dorset. He was knighted by Queen Elizabeth in 1601 at Basing House. In 1601, he was elected MP for Fowey and in 1604 he was elected MP for Downton. He was elected MP for Downton again in 1621.

Aubrey says of Raleigh that he "had a delicate clear voice, and played skilfully on the olpharion".

Raleigh married Dorothy Thynne, widow of Sir John Thynne and daughter of Sir William Wroughton of Broad Heighton, Wiltshire. Their three sons included Member of Parliament (MP) Gilbert Ralegh and Walter Raleigh, DD, who became Dean of Wells. They also had one daughter.

Political offices
Preceded by Sir Christopher Hatton	Vice-Admiral of Dorset; 1591–1603	Succeeded by Thomas Howard, 3rd Viscount Howard of Bindon
