= Poll taxes of 1376–1381 =

Series of poll taxes in England

The Poll taxes of 1376–1381 was a series of three poll taxes in the Kingdom of England between 1376 and 1381 that was credited with leading up to the Peasants' Revolt of 1381. Each time the taxation basis was slightly different.

== First Poll Tax ==
The Bad Parliament, held between January and March 1377, levied a poll tax in 1377 to finance the war against France at the request of John of Gaunt who, since King Edward III was mortally sick, was the de facto head of government at the time. This tax covered almost 60% of the population, far more than lay subsidies had earlier.

Every lay person over the age of 14 years who was not a beggar had to pay a groat (4d) to the Crown with a deduction for married couples.For comparison, the wage for an unskilled labourer in Essex in 1380 was around three pence a day.

Designed to spread the cost of the war over a broader economic base than previous tax levies, this round of taxation proved extremely unpopular but raised £22,000 (equivalent to £21,826,053 in 2025).

== Second Poll Tax ==
The war continued to go badly and, despite raising some money through forced loans, the Crown returned to Parliament in 1379 to request further funds. The Commons were supportive of the young King, but had concerns about the amounts of money being sought and the way this was being spent by the King's counsellors, whom they suspected of corruption.

A second poll tax was approved, this time with a sliding scale of taxes against seven different social classes, with the upper classes paying more in absolute terms. The lower age limit was changed to 16. Widespread evasion proved to be a problem, and the tax only raised £18,600 – far short of the £50,000 that had been hoped for.

== Third Poll Tax ==
In November 1380, Parliament was called together again in Northampton. Archbishop Simon Sudbury, the new Lord Chancellor, updated the Commons on the worsening situation in France, a collapse in international trade, and the risk of the Crown having to default on its debts. The Commons were told that the colossal sum of £160,000 was now required in new taxes, and arguments ensued between the royal council and Parliament about what to do next.

The tax was assessed on each person over 15, with no allowance made for married couples. The levy of 1381 operated under a combination of both flat rate and graduated assessments. The minimum amount payable was set at 4d, however tax collectors had to account for a 12d a head mean assessment. Payments were therefore variable; the poorest would theoretically pay the lowest rate, with the deficit being met by a higher payment from those able to afford it. Parliament estimated the tax would raise £66,666.

The third poll tax was highly unpopular and many in the south-east evaded it by refusing to register. The royal council appointed new commissioners in March 1381 to interrogate local village and town officials in an attempt to find those who were refusing to comply. The extraordinary powers and interference of these teams of investigators in local communities, primarily in the south-east and east of England, raised still further the tensions surrounding the taxes. The 1381 tax has been credited as one of the main reasons behind the Peasants' Revolt in that year, due in part to attempts to restore feudal conditions in rural areas.

== Bibliography ==
- Dunn, Alastair (2002). The Great Rising of 1381: the Peasants' Revolt and England's Failed Revolution. Stroud, UK: Tempus. ISBN 978-0-7524-2323-4.
- Dyer, Christopher (2000). Everyday Life in Medieval England. London and New York: Hambledon and London. ISBN 978-1-85285-201-6.
- Fenwick, Carolyn Christine (1983). The English Poll Taxes of 1377, 1379 and 1381: A Critical Examination of the Returns (PhD thesis). London School of Economics and Political Science (University of London). Archived from the original on 4 February 2021.
- Jones, Dan (2010). Summer of Blood: the Peasants' Revolt of 1381. London: Harper Press. ISBN 978-0-00-721393-1.
- Rubin, Miri (2006). The Hollow Crown: a History of Britain in the Late Middle Ages. London: Penguin. ISBN 978-0-14-014825-1.
- Powell, Edgar (1896). The Rising of 1381 in East Anglia. Cambridge: Cambridge University Press. OCLC 1404665.
- Sumption, J. (2009). Divided Houses: Hundred Years War. Vol. 3. London: Faber & Faber. ISBN 978-0-57124-012-8.
