= Henry Thorpe =

English politician

Henry Thorpe (died 1416), of Boscombe, Wiltshire, was an English politician.

He was a member (MP) of the parliament of England for Wiltshire in 1411.
