= William de Westbury =

English judge

William Westbury (c. 1385 – 1448/49), also called William de Westbury and William of Westbury, was a fifteenth-century judge of the King's Bench.

== Career ==
William de Westbury was for many years the steward of the manor of Castle Combe, near Chippenham, Wiltshire, and during that time was noted as being a lawyer by profession. He was also active in the Assize Court, Common Pleas circa 1406 when described as an "Apprentice". Later records held within the National Archives indicate that William de Westbury held the office of Bishop's Bailiff of New Sarum from approximately 1411 to 1418. He was appointed Sergeant-at-law in 1418 (after refusal of the position in 1415; the judges' pay had not kept pace with the times and acceptance to become Sergeant-at-law sometimes led to appointment as a judge and reduced earnings). As a consequence of insufficient numbers of Sergeants, a large penalty was imposed by Parliament upon persons refusing the summons. He was appointed Judge of the King's Bench on 6 February 1426.

He died in about 1448–1449. William's Will dated 12 November 1448 was proved 5 January 1449.

== Family ==
Westbury was the son of John de Westbury, of Westbury, and John de Westbury, a member of parliament for Wiltshire, was his younger brother.

He married Katharine FitzWarin, a daughter of William FitzWarin, and their children include Agnes de Westbury, who married Robert Leversegge.

Westbury inherited the manor of Sewell (Sewells, Shewells, Sewelles) from William FitzWarin, probably as a result of his marriage into the family, and continued to hold it until his death.

== Endowments ==
At the church of All Saints in Westbury, in Sarum diocese, William de Westbury and his father John built a chapel in the north aisle, and in 1437 they endowed a chantry there. In the 16th year of King Henry VI (1438–39) they granted "...messuages, land, and rent in Westbury and Honybrigge to the chaplain of his new chapel in Westbury church, retaining land in Westbury, Wiltshire". William bequeathed his body to be interred in a tomb in the new chapel on the north side near the inner vail under a glazed window within this church.
