= Richard Horn =

Richard Horn may refer to:

- Richard L. Van Horn, president of the University of Houston and president of the University of Oklahoma
- Dick Horn, American football player
- Richard Horn (DEA), brought lawsuit against CIA

== See also ==
- Richard Horne (disambiguation)
