= John Persons =

English politician

John Persons (died 7 April 1424), of Hindon, Wiltshire, was an English politician.

== Biography ==
Son of John Persons Senior, he was a Member of Parliament (MP) for Wiltshire in 1420. He was escheator of Hampshire and Wiltshire. At the time of his death, he, and partners Robert de Bodenham and John Burnell, had fallen into arrears on a lease of 11 manors in Gloucestershire, Dorset and Wiltshire, for which the landowners sought substantial damages in the Court of Common Pleas.
