= Milbourne =

Milbourne may refer to:

- Milbourne, Northumberland, England
- Milbourne, Wiltshire, a small settlement in Wiltshire, England
- Milbourne House, London, England
- Milbourne Lodge School, Surrey, England
- Milbourne Christopher (1914–1984), American illusionist, magic historian, and author

== People with the surname ==
- Henry Milbourne (17th century), Welsh magistrate
- Landon Milbourne (b. 1987), American basketball player in the Israeli Basketball Premier League
- Larry Milbourne (b. 1951), American baseball player
- Luke Milbourne (1649–1720), English clergyman, critic and poet
- Richard Milbourne (d. 1624), English bishop
- Richard Milbourne (MP) (d. 1451), English politician

== See also ==
- Milborne (disambiguation)
- Millbourne, Edmonton, Alberta, Canada
- Millbourne, Pennsylvania
