= Milborne =

Milborne may refer to:

- Blanche Milborne, Lady Mistress in charge of the upbringing of the children of Henry VIII of England
- Clayton Milborne (after 1676 – 1726), member of Parliament of Great Britain
- Jacob Milborne (c. 1648 – 16 May 1691), American clerk
- William Milborne (c. 1633 – 1660), member of the Parliament of England

== See also ==
- Milbourne (disambiguation)
- MV Ulysses (1941), a British merchant ship named Milborne between 1951 and 1964
