= John Dauntsey =

14th-century English politician

Sir John Dauntsey (died 1391), of Dauntsey, Wiltshire, was an English soldier and politician.

He was born the son of Richard Dauntsey of Wilsford, Wiltshire and was knighted by 1361. He entered the service of Edward, Lord Despenser and probably fought with him in his overseas campaigns, including in Brittany. After Despenser's death in 1375, he sailed in 1387 with Admiral Richard Fitzalan, Earl of Arundel to fight the French. He also served on a number of Commissions within Hampshire and Wiltshire and was selected as High Sheriff of Wiltshire for 1373–74.

He was a Member (MP) of the Parliament of England for Wiltshire in 1378, 1379, 1381, May 1382, October 1382 and February 1388.

He died on 31 October 1391 and was buried at Dauntsey, Wiltshire. He married Joan, the daughter and eventual heiress of Sir Roger Bavent of Norton Bavent, Wiltshire, with whom he had three sons. He was succeeded by their eldest son, also Sir John Dauntsey.
