= Robert Long (lawyer and landowner) =

Wiltshire landowner and Member of the Parliament of England

Robert Long (died 31 March 1447) of South Wraxall and Draycot Cerne in Wiltshire, was an English lawyer and landowner. He served as a Member of Parliament, mostly as an occasional knight of the shire for Wiltshire, and was the founder of the prominent Long family of South Wraxall and Draycott.

== Early life ==
Long was born in Wiltshire, the son of Thomas Long.

He became a lawyer at the Inns of Court in London and in his legal career was greatly assisted by members of the Hungerford family, including Walter Hungerford, 1st Baron Hungerford, who employed him as an advisor and trustee.

A Robert Long was acting as a deputy marshal in the Court of King's Bench by 1408, and this may have been the same man.

== Landholdings ==
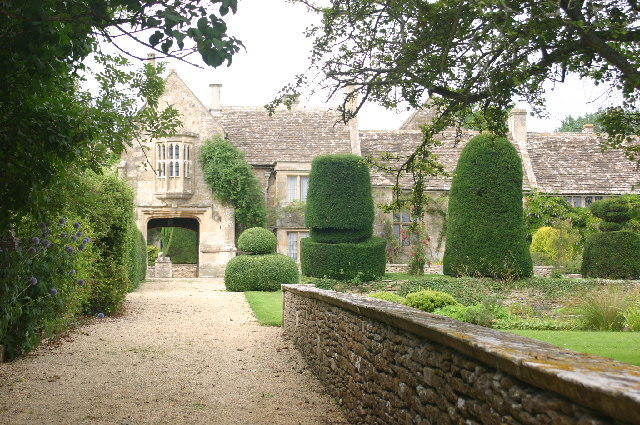
South Wraxall Manor

In 1409, Long bought land at Rode, Somerset. He later owned the manors of Draycot and South Wraxall, where he built a large house, South Wraxall Manor. Both of these estates descended in the male line of the Long family for more than four hundred years, with Draycot finally being bequeathed away by Long’s descendant William Pole-Tylney-Long-Wellesley, 5th Earl of Mornington, who in 1863 left it in his will to his cousin Henry Wellesley, 1st Earl Cowley.

== Parliamentary career ==
In 1414, Long was elected as one of the two members of parliament for Old Sarum, and will have attended Parliament when it met in November. In 1417 he was elected for Calne, and the one session of that parliament was from November to December. Thereafter, he was six times a knight of the shire for Wiltshire, in May 1421, December 1421, October 1423 to February 1424, September 1429 to February 1430, 1433, and January to March 1442. There were many intervening parliaments for which he was not elected.

On 4 November 1428 he was appointed Escheator of Hampshire and Wiltshire.

== Marriage and children ==
Long married twice:

- Firstly, at some time before 1417, he married Margaret Godfrey, of unrecorded family, by whom he had four sons, including:
  - John Long of Draycot Cerne
  - Henry Long, MP
  - Richard Long, MP for Old Sarum in 1442, the year that his father and two brothers were all Members of Parliament for various Wiltshire constituencies.
- Secondly, before 1428, he married Margaret Popham (born 1 May 1400), the widow of John Cowdray and of William Wayte of Draycot, Wiltshire, and daughter and eventual heiress of Sir Philip Popham, of Barton Stacey, Hampshire.

== Arms ==
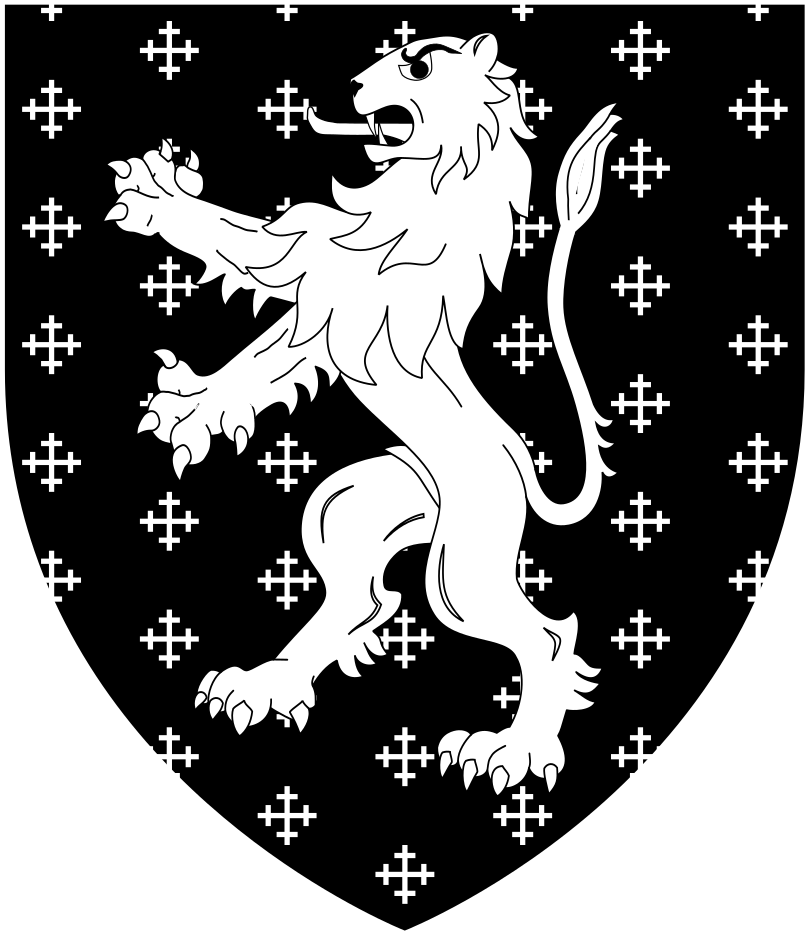
Arms of Long of South Wraxall

Long’s coat of arms is blazoned Sable semée of cross-crosslets, a lion rampant argent.

== Sources ==
- Kightly, Charles, biography of Long, Robert (d.1447), of South Wraxall, Wilts., published in History of Parliament: House of Commons 1386–1421, ed. J.S. Roskell, L. Clark, C. Rawcliffe., 1993
