= Walter Beauchamp =

English politician (died 1430)

Sir Walter Beauchamp (sometime around 1380 – 1 January 1430) was an English lawyer who was Speaker of the House of Commons of England between March and May 1416.

== Early life ==
Beauchamp was the second son of Sir John Beauchamp of Powick, Worcestershire. In his youth, Beauchamp studied the law and became distinguished as a soldier displaying great gallantry at the Battle of Agincourt. As a younger son, Walter did not enjoy the possessions of his family's chief estates in Worcestershire and Warwickshire. He did, however, use his family's connections at court, being retained by Thomas of Woodstock, Duke of Gloucester in May 1392 for services in Ireland. Upon his return to England, Beauchamp is believed to have rendered some service to Henry IV prior to his coronation on 23 October 1399, since ten days after that date he received a substantial grant of £40 a year for life, or until he was provided with lands to that value. The latter was granted in August 1400, when he and his bride assumed ownership for the term of their lives the duchy of Lancaster manors of Easterton and Berwick St. James in Wiltshire.

== Royal service ==
Sir Walter Beauchamp displayed the Arms of Beauchamp of Powick: Gules a fess between six martlets Or.

Following his acquisition of the Wiltshire manors, Beauchamp served as an esquire of the royal household. It is likely that he fought for the king at Shrewsbury in 1403 and campaigned in the north against Richard Scrope, Archbishop of York, and Henry Percy, 1st Earl of Northumberland in 1405. In 1415 he served as a king's knight in the royal army in France, as part of the retinue of Humphrey, Duke of Gloucester.

== Career in politics ==
He was appointed High Sheriff of Wiltshire for 1403 and 1407. On his return from France after the Battle of Agincourt he entered Parliament in 1416 as Knight of the Shire for Wiltshire, and on 16 March 1416 was chosen speaker of the House of Commons. However, Sir Walter did not hold the office long, as Parliament was dissolved in the same year.

In 1417 he served in France again, and was at Rouen after its capture in 1419. He remained in Normandy for two years, on his return becoming treasurer of the royal household, treasurer at war and one of the executors of Henry V's will in June 1421. Shortly afterwards he passed into the service of Queen Catherine as steward of her household. He was also selected as one of the commoners to assist in the protection of the young Henry VI.

He was employed as counsel by his relative, Richard Beauchamp, earl of Warwick, to argue his claim of precedence before the House of Commons. This quarrel between the Earl of Warwick and John Mowbray, earl marshal, which took up much of the time of the session of 1425, was terminated by the restoration of the forfeited dukedom of Norfolk to Mowbray.

In 1429 he was made Master of the Horse.

== Later life and family ==
His older brother was Sir William Beauchamp (died c.1421), who was also a Member of Parliament. Walter married before August 1400, Elizabeth (c.1385 – February 1447), daughter and coheir of Sir John Roches (c.1333–1400) of Bromham, Wiltshire, and his wife Willelma, daughter and heir of Sir Robert de la Mare (1314–1382) of Steeple/Market Lavington, Wiltshire. They had three children: (1) Sir William Beauchamp (1410–1457), was in 1449 summoned to Parliament as 4th Baron St Amand, in right of his wife, Elizabeth Braybrooke (daughter of Gerard Braybrook) and the great-granddaughter of Almeric St Amand, 3rd Baron St Amand; (2) Richard Beauchamp (died 1482), bishop of Hereford and of Salisbury; and (3) Elizabeth Beauchamp, who married Richard Dudley, knight.

Walter Beauchamp was knighted in 1415. He died on 1 January 1430 and was buried at Steeple Lavington (now Market Lavington) church.

Political offices
Preceded by Richard Redman	Speaker of the House of Commons; 1416	Succeeded by Roger Flower
