= Henry Long (died 1490) =

Member of the Parliament of England (c.1417–1490)

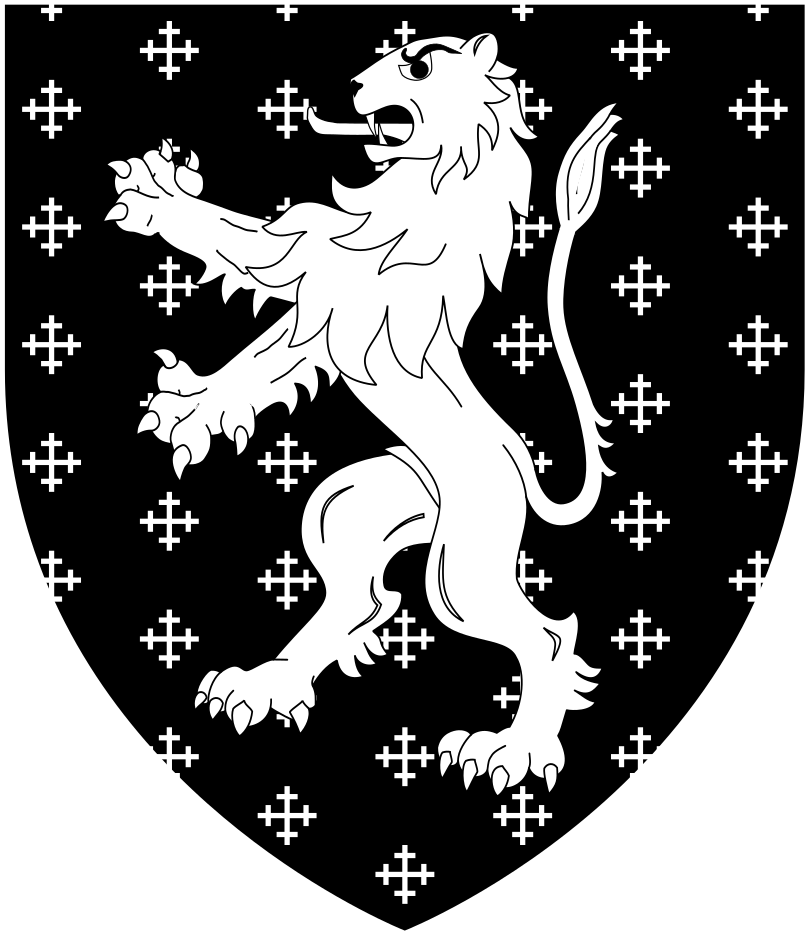
Arms of Long of South Wraxall: Sable semée of cross-crosslets, a lion rampant argent

Henry Long of Wraxall (c. 1417 – 3 May 1490) was an English lawyer, landowner, and member of Parliament, and was three times Sheriff of Wiltshire.

Born in Wiltshire, he was the son of Robert Long and Margaret Godfrey.

In 1435 he was elected one of the two Members of Parliament for Old Sarum, and in 1442 for Devizes. He was a knight of the shire for Wiltshire in 1449, 1453–4, and again 1472–5 and served on various commissions between 1450 and 1488. He was also Sheriff of Wiltshire in 1456, 1475, and 1482–3.

In Shakespeare's play Richard III, the Sheriff introduced in Act Five, Scene One, was Henry Long of Wraxall, who was Sheriff in the time of Richard III, in 1483.

Long married three times; to Joan Ernle, Margaret Newburgh and Joan Malwyn. He inherited the manor of South Wraxall from his father, but having no issue, the manor devolved on his nephew Sir Thomas Long.
