= Poll Tax of 1379 =

English tax

The Poll Tax of 1379 was granted to the King by the lords, commoners and clergy of England in order to finance the Hundred Years' War. It was graduated according to each taxpayers rank or social position, thereby avoiding dissatisfaction based on inequality and unfairness. The schedule of charge for this tax therefore contained a classification of the taxpayers. This poll tax was expected to net over £50,000, but the revenue never reached half that sum.

== Background ==
The fiscal exigencies of the Hundred Years' War compelled the Bad Parliament of 1377 to grant to the King a tax of four pence or a groat to be taken from the goods of each man and woman in the kingdom over fourteen, with the exception of genuine beggars. In addition the clergy granted a tax of 12 pence from every beneficed person, and a groat from every other religious person, with the exception of mendicant friars. Special commissions were appointed to collect the tax, and the county sheriffs were ordered to aid with the collection. The tax on laymen netted £22,607, 2 s., 6d. paid by 1,376, 442 persons, although the records of County Durham and Cheshire are missing.

The war continued with French attack on the southern coast of England, the towns of Dartmouth, Plymouth, Winchelsea and others suffered. The first parliament of Richard II therefore in 1377 granted for two years a tax of two fifteenths on movables without cities and boroughs and two tenths within. In addition parliament added a grant of customs subsidy on wool, woolfells and leather for three years. It also granted for one year six pence on the pound in goods imported and exported. The second parliament of Richard II granted in 1378 a tax of one fifteenth and a half on movables without cities and boroughs and one tenth and a half within. It also continued the previous customs on wool and merchandise a year longer. This grant did not produce the sum of money required for the war, and the third parliament of Richard II repealed in and replaced it with a poll tax that would be easier and faster to collect.

== Poll Tax of 1379 ==
The new poll tax of 1379 was graduated according to each taxpayer's rank or social position, thereby avoiding dissatisfaction based on inequality and unfairness. The schedule of charge for this tax therefore contained a classification of taxpayers. It is divided into four groups: the first is based on rank, the second on occupation (men of law), the third on civic hierarchy, and the fourth other men. Two commissions were appointed, one to assess, and the other to collect. Later in 1379 reassessment commissions were appointed. This poll tax was expected to net over £50,000, but the revenue never reached half that sum. In 1379 the Convocations of Canterbury and York met and granted an almost identical poll tax for the clergy.

== Schedule ==
Tax	Granted by the Lords and Commoners				Granted by the Convocations of Canterbury and York
	Men of Rank	Men of Law	Civic	Others	Ecclesiastical
10 marks	The Duke of Lancaster; The Duke of Brittany	-	-	-	Archbishop of Canterbury; Archbishop of York
7½ marks	-	Justices of the King's Bench and Common Pleas, those who have been justices, and the Chief Baron of the Exchequer	-	-	-
6 marks	Earls and widowed countesses	-	Mayor of London	-	Bishops, mitred abbots, abbots and priors peers of the realm, priors of cathedral churches.
4½ marks	-	-	-	-	Abbots, priors or prioresses, deans and archdeacons, provosts, precentors, chancellors, treasurers, prebendaries of cathedral and collegiate churches, rectors and curates holding benefices and ministries of the value of 500 marks per year.
3 marks	Barons and widowed baronesses Bannerets and widowed banneresses Knights who can spend as much Chief Prior of the Knights Hospitaller	Serjeants and grand apprentices at law	Aldermen of London; Mayors of the great towns of England	Married advocates, notaries and proctors according to their estate.	Others having benefice or office of the value of £200 to 500 marks per year
2½ marks	-	-	-	-	Others having benefice or office of the value of 100 to £200 per year
1½ marks	Bachelors; Esquires who by statute should be knights Every widowed dame, wife of bachelors and esquires aforesaid. Commanders of the Knights Hospitaller	-	Mayors of the other towns of England according to the amount of their estate Jurats of considerable towns Every other apprentice of law Great merchants of the Kingdom	Married advocates, notaries and proctors according to their estate.	Others having benefice or office of the value of 100 marks to £100 per year
1 mark	Knights of the Knights Hospitaller	-	All other substantial merchants.	Married advocates, notaries and proctors according to their estate.	Others having benefice or office of the value of 40 to 100 marks per year.
3/4 mark	-	-	Mayors of the other towns of England according to the amount of their estate	-	Others having benefice or office of the value of 20 to £40 per year
½ mark	Esquires of less estate, and every woman widow of such esquire	All other apprentices of lesser estate and attorneys	Mayors of the other towns of England according to the amount of their estate Smaller merchants and artificers who have gain of land according to their estate Serjeants and franklins of the country according to their estate Farmers of manors, parsonages and granges according to their estate. Cattle dealers and dealers in all other mean merchandise according to their estate. Widowed wives of sufficient merchants	-	-
1/4 mark	Esquires having no possessions in land, rent or chattels, in service or following the profession of arms. Every other brother of the Knights Hospitaller.	-	Smaller merchants and artificers who have gain of land according to the amount of their estate. Serjeants and franklins of the country, according to their estate. Farmers of manors, parsonages and granges according to their estate. Cattle dealers and dealers in all other mean merchandise according to their estate.	Married pardoners and summoners according to their estate. Hostelers who are not merchants, according to their estate.	Others (prioresses excepted) having benefice or office of the value of 10 to £20 per year. Monks, canons, and other religious men belonging to houses with a yearly value of 300 marks. Unmarried advocates, proctors and notaries
6 groats	-	-	Smaller merchants and artificers who have gain of land according to the amount of their estate. Farmers of manors, parsonages and granges according to their estate. Cattle dealers and dealers in all other mean merchandise according to their estate.	Married pardoners and summoners according to their estate.	All others holding cures and benefices, as well as parochial chaplains and others celebrating anniversaries of whatsoever condition they be, and chaplains serving magnates and lords, and all other chaplains celebrating in cathedral, collegiate and conventual churches.
5 groats	-	-	-	-	Monks and such persons belonging to houses with a yearly value of 100 to 300 marks. Unmarried advocates, proctors and notaries (not in the Province of York).
3 groats	-	-	Smaller merchants and artificers who have gain of land according to the amount of their estate. Farmers of manors, parsonages and granges according to their estate. Cattle dealers and dealers in all other mean merchandise according to their estate.	Married pardoners and summoners according to their estate. Hostelers who are not merchants, according to their estate.	Monks and such persons belonging to houses with a yearly value of £40 to 100 marks.
1½ groats	-	-	Smaller merchants and artificers who have gain of land according to the amount of their estate Farmers of manors, parsonages and granges according to their estate. Cattle dealers and dealers in all other mean merchandise according to their estate.	-	-
1 groat	-	-	-	Every married man for himself and his wife. Every man or women sole over the age of sixteen.	Monks and such persons belonging to houses with a yearly value of £40 and under. All other clergy not promoted or beneficed who are over 16 years of age. Religious women of houses with a yearly value of £40 or more.
Nil	-	-	-	Real beggars	Persons under sixteen years and mendicants. Recluses of the Order of Sempringham.
Also	Every foreign merchant, of whatsoever status he be, to pay according to his estate like denizens.				-
