= Robert Dingley (died 1395) =

English politician

Robert Dingley (died 7 February 1395), of Wolverton, Hampshire, was an English politician.

He was a member (MP) of the parliament of England for Wiltshire in May 1394.
