= Peter Stantor =

English politician

Peter Stantor (died 1415), of Ebbesbourne Wake, Wiltshire, was an English politician.

He was a member (MP) of the parliament of England for Wiltshire in January 1404.
