= John Lilborne =

English politician

Sir John Lilborne (born 1341), of Milton Lilborne, Wiltshire, was an English politician.

He was a member (MP) of the parliament of England for Wiltshire in 1395.
