= William Wroughton =

16th-century English politician

Sir William Wroughton (1509/10–1559), of Broad Hinton, Wiltshire, was an English politician.

He was a Member (MP) of the Parliament of England for Wiltshire in 1547 and April 1554. He built Broad Hinton's parish church of St. Peter Ad Vincula.

He married Eleanor Lewknor, daughter of Edward Lewknor and a seven-time great-granddaughter of King Edward III. Their many descendants include the Wolseley baronets and Garnet Wolseley, 1st Viscount Wolseley. Their four sons and three daughters included:

- Dorothy Wroughton, who married about 1556 Sir John Thynne, had issue, and following his death married Sir Carew Ralegh, older brother of Sir Walter Raleigh, and had issue.
- Ann Wroughton, who married Sir Henry Poole of Saperton (d. 1616), Member of Parliament, and had issue.
- Sir Thomas Wroughton (died 1597).
- Sir James Wroughton, elected MP for Cirencester in 1597.
