= Richard Horne (MP) =

English politician

- Died: 29 April 1394

Richard Horne (died 1394), of Britford, Wiltshire was an English politician.

He was a member (MP) of the parliament of England for Wiltshire in September 1388.
