= John Gawen =

English politician

Member of Parliament for Wiltshire
- In office 1394–1395

Personal details
- Died: 1418

John Gawen (fl. 1370s – died 1418), of Norrington, Wiltshire, was an English politician. He was the eldest son of John Gawen and Margaret Jooe.

He was a Member (MP) of the Parliament of England for Wiltshire in 1394 and 1395.

He built Norrington Manor in the late 1370s. He had a reputation as an outstanding lawyer and an efficient administrator who served for many years as justice of the peace. He became one of the leading figures in the county, due largely to his close association with John Waltham, Bishop of Salisbury, and later with John, 6th Baron Lovel. Both Waltham and Lovel were favourites of King Richard II, which no doubt contributed to Gawen's powerful local position. However, the downfall of King Richard and his replacement by Henry IV did not affect Gawen's position: he remained a leading figure in his county until his death in 1418.

He married twice, and his family remained at Norrington until the seventeenth century. The family were notable recusants, and were ultimately forced to sell Norrington to pay the fines imposed for recusancy. John Gavan (died 1679), the Catholic martyr who was executed during the Popish Plot, was probably descended from Gawen.

He died shortly before 17 June 1418.
