= Thomas Bonham (MP) =

English politician

- Died: 4 October 1420
- Occupation: Politician

Thomas Bonham (died 4 October 1420), of Great Wishford, Wiltshire, was an English politician.

== Life ==
Thomas Bonham was born into a privileged, landowning family. The precise time of his birth is unknown but his existence is first known to have been recorded in 1380 by which point he was old enough to be involved in a legal contract. His father, Nicholas, had served in the Parliament of England and was a prominent figure in local politics. Upon his death, Elder Bonham divided his assets between Thomas and two of his brothers. Additionally, Thomas Bonham gained multiple manors from his first marriage in the early 1380s. In 1412 his estate was valued at £45 (roughly the equivalent of £28,355 in 2017) for tax purposes. The family was closely linked to the Church with four of Bonham's siblings becoming priests and nuns.

Bonham spent much of the first decade of the 15th century working as Steward of the Duchy of Lancaster. He also spent periods of his recorded life as Sheriff of Wiltshire and frequently helped with the legal affairs of other local landowners. He was a Member of the Parliament of England for Wiltshire in 1406, November 1414 and 1415. Bonham died on 4 October 1420. His granddaughter Alice, the wife of Robert Pompession, was heir to property he had gained through his first marriage whilst the rest of his estate went to his eldest son William who died before coming of age and later his second son Thomas.
