= Baron St Amand =

Extinct barony in the Peerage of England

Arms of St Amand: Or fretty sable, on a chief of the second three bezants. Aumary de Saint Amand was at the Siege of Caerlaverock in 1300, when his arms were recorded in the Caerlaverock Roll (1300): Aumary de Saint Amand, who claims a place among the bold, "or and fretty sable carried, on a chief three roundels gold". Quartered by Baron Cobham of Cobham Hall in Kent

Baron St Amand was a title created twice in the Peerage of England: firstly in 1299 for Amauri de St Amand (born 1268 or 1269; died 1310), who died without issue, when it became extinct; and secondly in 1313 for his brother John de St Amand (1283/6–1330).

== Creation of 1299 ==
- Amauri de St Amand, 1st Baron Amand (born 1268 or 1269; died 1310), summoned to Parliament from 29 December 1299 to 1311 by writs directed to Almarico de sancto Amando. He was the brother and heir of Guy de St Amand (1268–1287), who died without issue, both sons of Amauri de St Amand (d.1285). He was at the Siege of Carlaverock Castle in 1300 when his arms were recorded in verse in the Caerlaverock Roll as follows:

Aumary de Saint Amand,
who claims a place among the bold,
Or and fretty sable carried,
On a chief three roundels gold.

He married a certain Mary but died without issue.

== Creation of 1313 ==
- John de St Amand, 1st Baron Amand (1283/6–1330), brother of 1st Baron of 1299 creation. In about 1313 he married Margaret le Despenser, a daughter of Hugh le Despenser, 1st Earl of Winchester (1261–1326), by his wife Isabel de Beauchamp, a daughter of William de Beauchamp, 9th Earl of Warwick (c.1238–1298).
- Amauri de St Amand, 2nd Baron Amand (1315–1381), son and heir, of West Woodhay in Berkshire, Justiciar of Ireland, Captain and keeper of Southampton.
- Amauri de St Amand, 3rd Baron Amand (1341–1402), son, died without surviving male issue, leaving two co-heirs via his daughters;
- Gerard Braybroke, 4th Baron Amand (1394–1422), grandson and eldest co-heir of the 3rd Baron, who in 1416 on the death of the other co-heir became the 4th Baron. He married twice but died without male issue;
  - Elizabeth Braybroke, suo jure 5th Baroness Amand (d.1491), 2nd daughter and co-heiress, eventually only surviving daughter and heiress. In about 1426 she married William Beauchamp, Sheriff of Wiltshire, elder son of Sir Walter Beauchamp (younger son of John Beauchamp of Powick in Worcestershire) by his wife the heiress Elizabeth Roches, and brother of Richard Beauchamp (d.1481), Bishop of Salisbury.
- William Beauchamp, 5th Baron Amand (d.1457), summoned to Parliament from 2 January 1449 by writs directed Willelmo Beauchamp domino de Sancto Amando, by which he is deemed to have become Baron St Amand.
- Richard Beauchamp, 6th Baron Amand (1453/61–1508), son, died without legitimate issue, when the barony became extinct.
