= Robert Ashley (died 1433) =

English politician

Robert Ashley (died 1432/3), of Budbury by Bradford-on-Avon, Wiltshire, was an English politician.

He was a member (MP) of the parliament of England for Wiltshire in 1419.
