= Richard Milbourne (MP) =

English politician

Richard Milboune or Melbourne (died 1451), of Laverstock, Wiltshire, was an English politician.

He was a member (MP) of the parliament of England for Wiltshire in May 1421, 1423, 1425 and 1439.
