= Thomas Hungerford (speaker) =

English politician (died 1397)

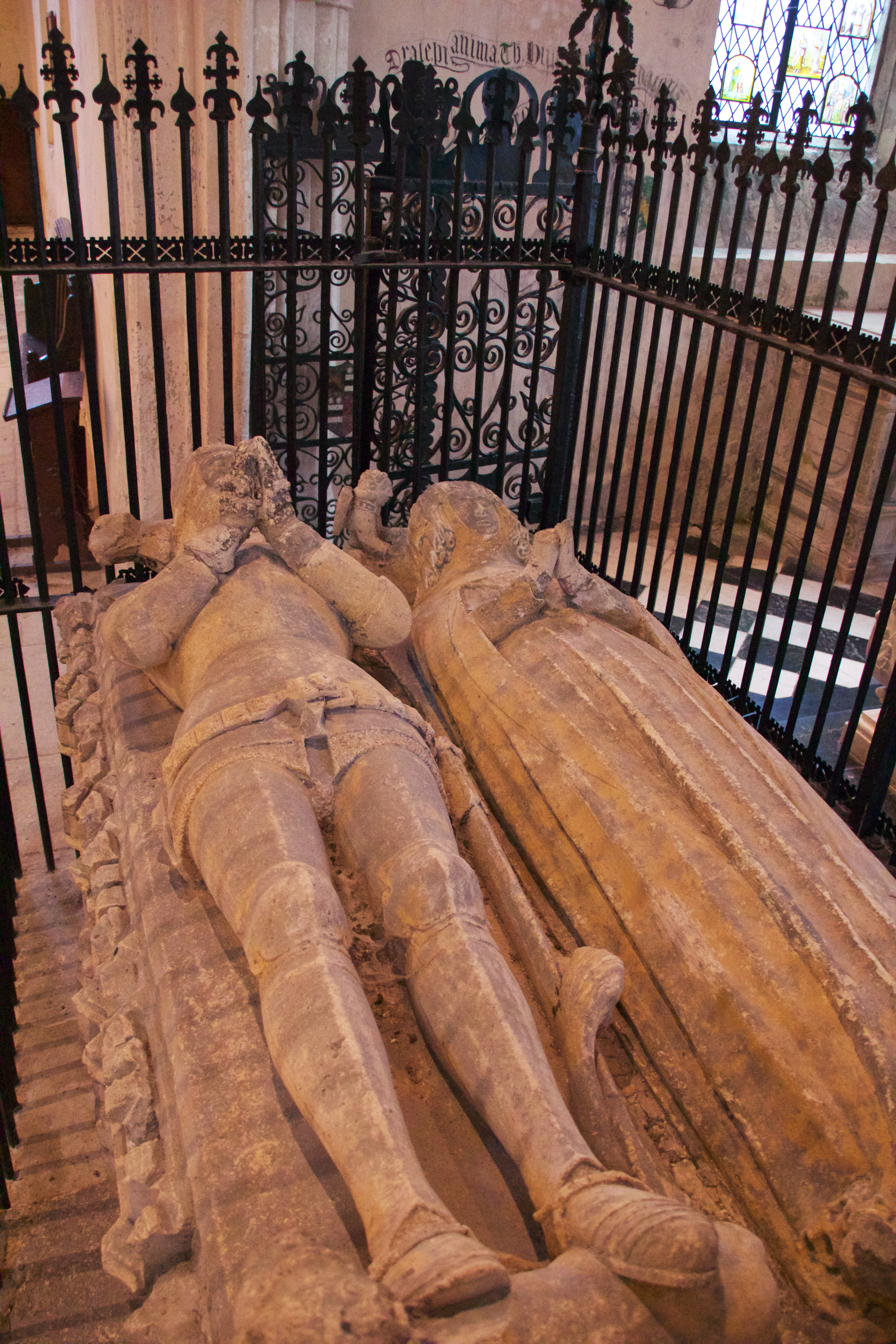
Effigies of Sir Thomas de Hungerford (1330–1398) and his second wife Joan Hussey (died 1412), in the Chapel of St Anne (north transept chapel) of St Leonard's Chapel, Farleigh Hungerford Castle

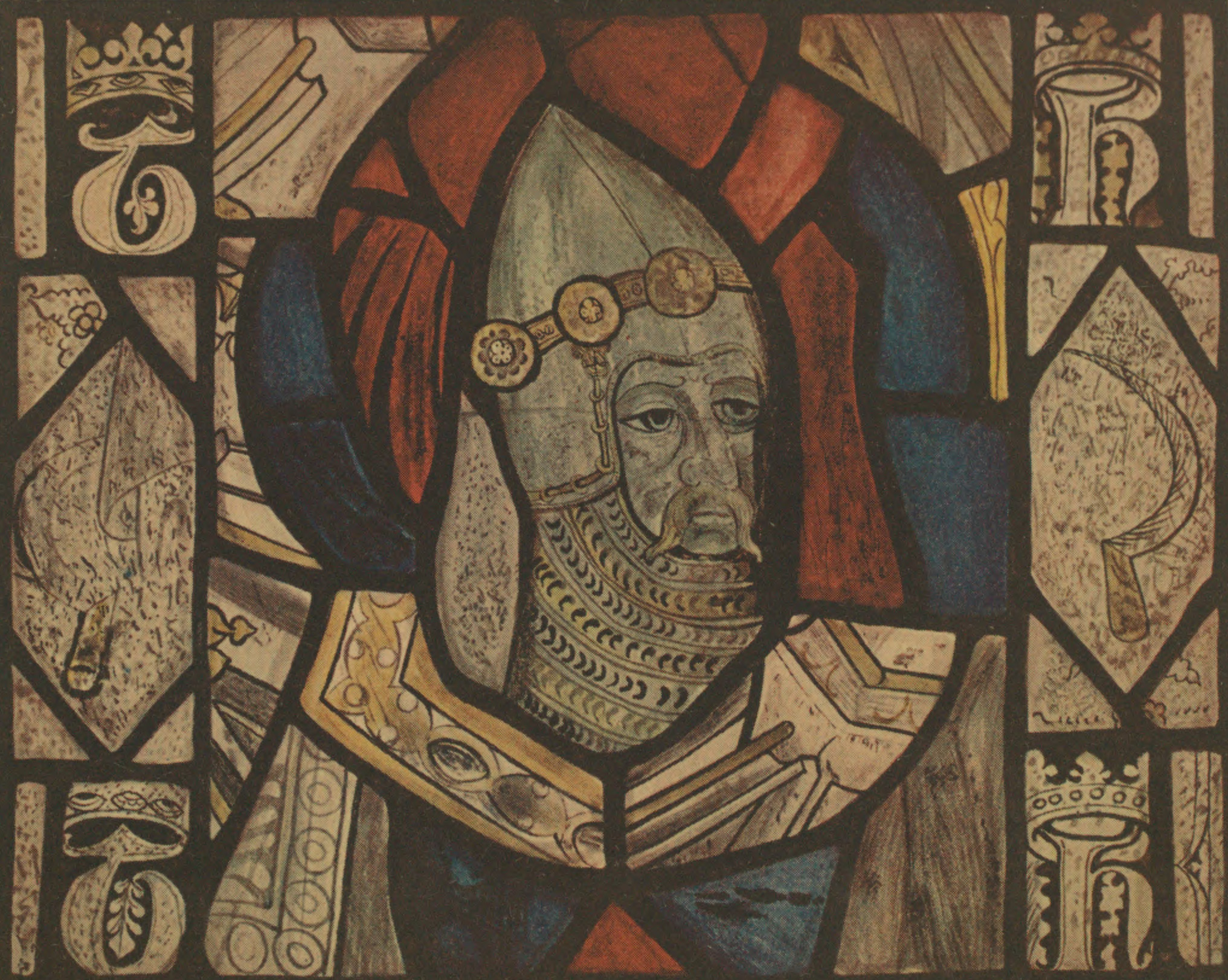
Stained glass window of Sir Thomas Hungerford, Farleigh Hungerford Castle.

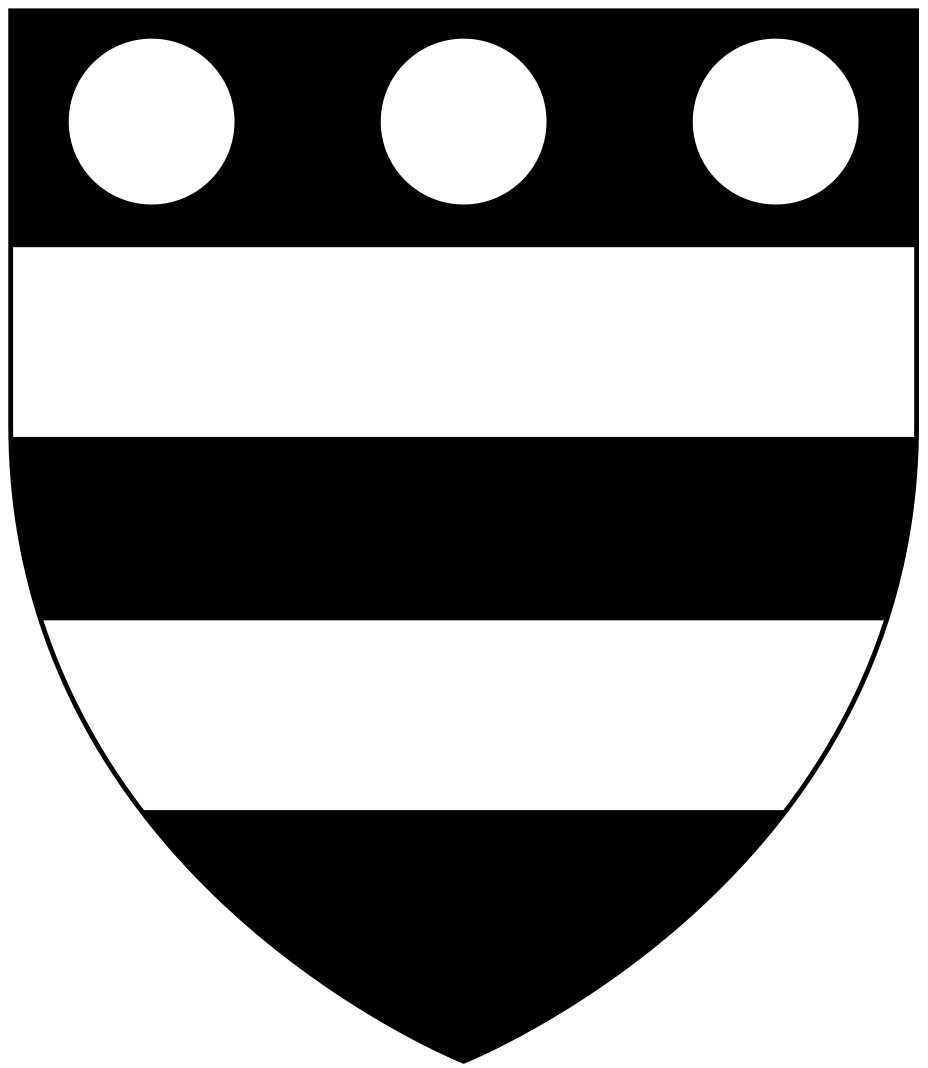
Arms of Hungerford: Sable, two bars argent in chief three plates

Sir Thomas de Hungerford (died 3 December 1397) of Farleigh Castle in Somerset, was the first person to be recorded in the rolls of the Parliament of England as holding the office of Speaker of the House of Commons of England, although that office had existed before his tenure.

== Origins ==
Hungerford was the son of Walter de Hungerford of Heytesbury, Wiltshire, thrice a Member of Parliament for Wiltshire, in 1331/2, 1333/4 and 1336. His mother was Elizabeth FitzJohn, daughter and heiress of Sir Adam FitzJohn of Cherhill in Wiltshire. The Hungerford family had been seated in Wiltshire since at least the twelfth century.

=== Uncle ===
Thomas's uncle was Robert Hungerford (d.1355), a Member of Parliament for Wiltshire in 1316 and a commissioner to inquire into the possessions of the Despensers after their attainder in 1328, and gave much land to the hospital at Calne in memory of his first wife, Joan, to the church of Hungerford, Berkshire, and to other religious foundations. He was buried in 1355 in Hungerford Church, where an elaborate monument long existed above his grave. An inscription to his memory is still extant in the church. His second wife was Geva, widow of Adam de Stokke, but he left no issue.

== Career ==
Hungerford was Sheriff of Wiltshire from 1355 to 1360 and served several times as a Member of Parliament for Wiltshire: in April 1357, in 1360, 1362, January 1376/7, twice in 1380, in 1383, 1384, 1386, January 1389/90, and in January 1392/3. He served as a Member of Parliament for Somerset in 1378, 1382, 1388, and 1390. He was returned for both constituencies in 1384 and January 1389/90. He was knighted in February 1375. He was closely associated with John of Gaunt and acted for some time as steward of Gaunt's household.

Owing to Gaunt's influence, he was chosen in January 1376/7, in the last of Edward III's parliaments (the Bad Parliament), to act as Speaker of the House of Commons. According to the Rolls of Parliament (ii. 374) Hungerford "avait les paroles pur les communes d'Angleterre en cet parliament" ('[he] spoke for the commons of England in this Parliament'). He is thus the first person formally mentioned in the Rolls of Parliament as holding the office of speaker. Sir Peter de la Mare preceded him in the post, without the title, in the Good Parliament of 1376. In 1380 Hungerford was appointed Forester of Selwood. In 1369 he purchased from Walter Pavely, de jure Baron Burghersh, the manor of Farleigh Montfort, now called Farleigh Hungerford, which served as the chief residence of his descendants, and in 1383 obtained licence to crenellate his manor house there, which thus became Farleigh Castle. In about 1384 he aroused the suspicion of King Richard II, who attached him, but he obtained a pardon and also a confirmation of his free warren at Farleigh.

== Marriages and children ==
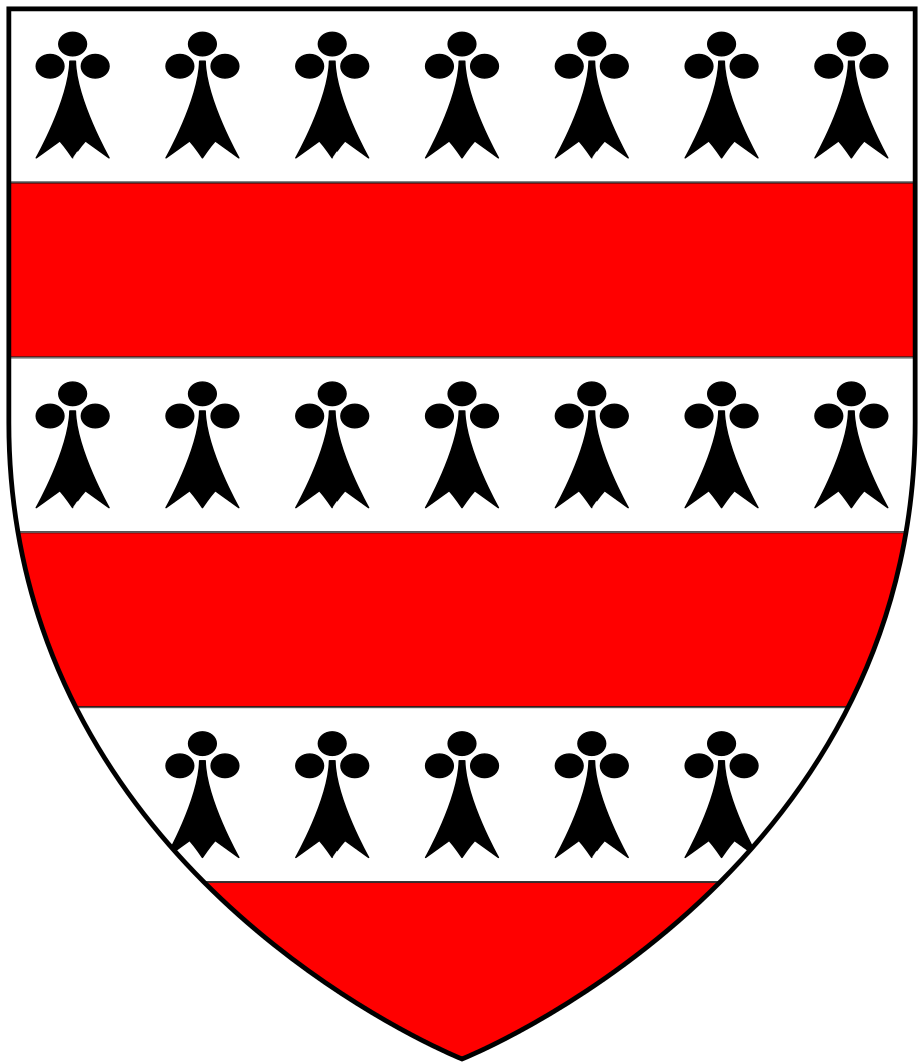
Arms of Hussey: Barry of six ermine and gules, as visible on the seal of Walter Hungerford, 1st Baron Hungerford

He married twice:

- Firstly to Eleanor Strug, daughter and heiress of Sir John Strug of Heytesbury;
- Secondly to Joan Hussey (d. 1 March 1412), heiress of Sir Edmund Hussey of Holbrook, by whom he had one surviving son and heir, three other sons having predeceased him:
  - Walter Hungerford, 1st Baron Hungerford (died 1449)

== Death and burial ==
Hungerford died at Farleigh on 3 December 1397, and was buried in the Chapel of St Anne (north transept chapel) of St Leonard's Chapel, Farleigh Hungerford Castle, where his chest tomb with effigies of himself and his wife survive. His portrait was made in a stained-glass window, engraved in Hoare's Modern History of Wiltshire, Heytesbury Hundred, p. 90.

== Sources ==
- Lee Sidney. Dictionary of National Biography, Volume 28, pp. 257,258
  - Dugdale's Baronage;
  - Collinson's Somerset, iii.353;
  - Manning's Lives of the Speakers;
  - Returns of members of parliament;
  - Hoare's Hungerfordiana, privately printed, 1823;
  - Canon Jackson's Guide to Farleigh-Hungerford, 1853.

Attribution

- History of Parliament HUNGERFORD, Sir Thomas (d.1397), of Farleigh Hungerford, Somerset and Heytesbury, Wilts
- Lee, Sidney, ed. (1891). "Hungerford, Thomas" . Dictionary of National Biography. Vol. 28. London: Smith, Elder & Co.

Political offices
Preceded by Sir Peter de la Mare (as Parlour/Prolocutor)	Speaker of the House of Commons; 1377	Succeeded by Sir Peter de la Mare
