= Walter Hungerford, 1st Baron Hungerford =

English politician (1378–1449)

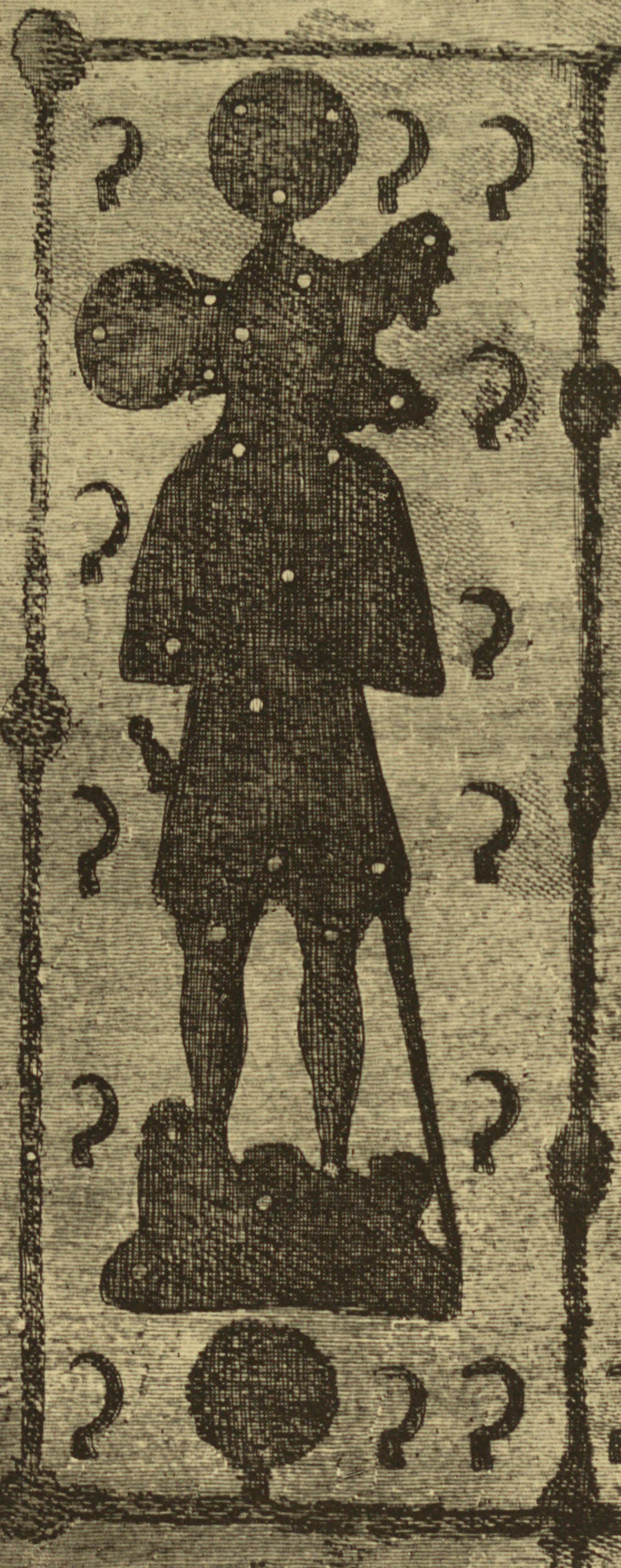
18th c. drawing of ledger stone from lost monument of Sir Walter Hungerford in the north nave of Salisbury Cathedral. Only the recesses remain to show the shapes of the looted monumental brasses, many having Hungerford sickles, his heraldic badge.

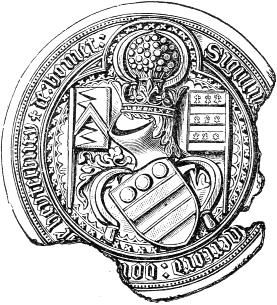
Post 1418 seal of Walter Hungerford, 1st Baron Hungerford. Latin inscription: SIGILLU(M WALTERI DE HUN)GERFORD DOM(INI) DE HEYTESBURY + DE HOMET ("Seal of Walter de Hungerford, lord of Heytesbury and of Homet"). His arms of Hungerford are shown on a shield couchée, centre, supported by two Hungerford sickles. His crest is the Peverell garb between two Hungerford sickles. The banner at dexter shows Party per pale indented gules and vert, a chevron or (de Heytesbury) and at sinister Barry of six ermine and gules (Hussey, his mother's family).

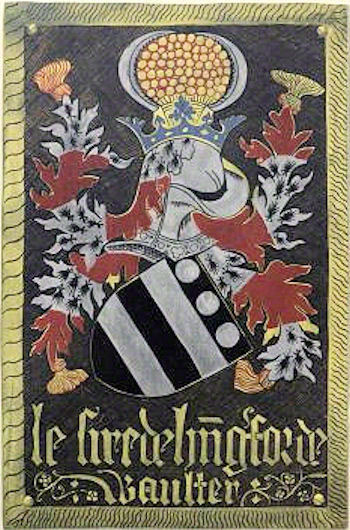
Le Sire de H(u)ng(er)forde, Waulter. Garter stall plate, Windsor Castle, of Walter Hungerford, 1st Baron Hungerford. The helm is covered by mantling barry of ermine and gules, the arms of Hussey. The crest is: Within a crest coronet azure a Peverell garb or between two Hungerford sickles argent.

Walter Hungerford, 1st Baron Hungerford (1378 – 9 August 1449) was an English knight and landowner, from 1400 to 1414 a Member of the House of Commons, of which he became Speaker, then was an Admiral and peer.

He won renown in the Hundred Years' War, fighting in many engagements, including the Battle of Agincourt in 1415. He was an English envoy at the Council of Constance in 1415. In 1417 he was made admiral of the fleet. On the death of Henry V he was an executor of Henry's will and a member of Protector Gloucester's council. He attended the conference at Arras in 1435, and was a Member of the House of Lords sitting as Baron Hungerford from January 1436 until his death in 1449. From 1426 to 1432, he served as Lord High Treasurer. Hungerford's tenure as Treasurer occurred during the Great Bullion Famine and the beginning of the Great Slump in England.

== Origins ==
He was the only surviving son and heir of Sir Thomas Hungerford (died 1398) of Farleigh Castle in Wiltshire, the first person to be recorded in the rolls of the Parliament of England as holding the office of Speaker of the House of Commons. His mother was his father's second wife, Joan Hussey (died 1412), daughter and heiress of Sir Edmund Hussey of Holbrook.

== Career ==
His father had been strongly attached to the Lancastrian cause at the close of the reign of King Richard II (1377–1399), having been steward in the household of John of Gaunt. On the accession of King Henry IV in 1399, Walter was knighted and was granted an annuity of £40 out of the lands of Margaret, Duchess of Norfolk. He served as Member of Parliament for Wiltshire in October 1400, in 1404, 1407, 1413, and in January 1413–14, and served as Member of Parliament for Somerset in 1409. He served as an MP from 29 January 1413/14, and as Speaker of the House of Commons from 30 April 1414, during the second parliament of Henry V, known as the Fire and Faggot Parliament, until its dissolution on 29 May 1414. This was the last parliament in which he served as an MP.

He was appointed Sheriff of Wiltshire for 1405, during which term he pronounced his own selection as MP for Wiltshire, and as Sheriff of Somerset and Dorset for 1414.

Hungerford won renown as a warrior. In 1401 he was with the English army in France, and is said to have defeated the French king in a duel outside Calais. He distinguished himself in battle and tournament, and received substantial rewards. In consideration of his services he was granted in 1403 one hundred marks per annum, payable by the town and castle of Marlborough in Wiltshire, and was appointed Sheriff of Wiltshire. On 22 July 1414 he was nominated ambassador to treat for a league with Sigismund, King of the Romans, and as the English envoy attended the Council of Constance in 1414–15.

In the autumn of 1415, with twenty men-at-arms and sixty horse archers, Hungerford accompanied King Henry V to France. He can probably be identified as the officer who on the eve of the Battle of Agincourt expressed regret that the English had not ten thousand archers, which drew a famous rebuke from the king. In Shakespeare's Henry V, however, this officer is the Earl of Westmoreland. He fought bravely at the Battle of Agincourt, but the legend that he took Charles, Duke of Orléans prisoner is not substantiated. He was employed in May 1416 in diplomatic negotiations with ambassadors of Theodoric, Archbishop of Cologne and in November 1417 with envoys from France.

In 1417 he was made Admiral of the Fleet under John of Lancaster, 1st Duke of Bedford, and in 1418 was with King Henry V at the Siege of Rouen. In November 1418 he was designated Steward of the King's Household, and was granted the barony of Hommet in Normandy (today Le Hommet). He took part in the peace negotiations of 1419 and on 3 May 1421 was installed as a Knight of the Garter.

Hungerford was an executor of the will of King Henry V, and in 1422 became a member of the council of Humphrey, Duke of Gloucester, the Lord Protector. In 1424 he was made Steward of the Household of the infant King Henry VI. Within his household was one Owen Tudur, a welshman who would later secretly marry Henry V's widow Catherine of Valos and so found the Tudor dynasty. On 7 January 1425/6, he was summoned by writ to Parliament as Baron Hungerford. The summons was continued to him until his death. Hungerford became Treasurer of England in succession to Bishop Stafford, when Bishop Beaufort's resignation of the Great Seal in March 1426–7 placed Gloucester in supreme power. He acted as Carver at Henry VI's coronation in Paris in December 1430, but on the change of ministry which followed Henry VI's return from France in February 1431–2, he ceased to be Treasurer. He attended the conference at Arras in 1435.

== Marriages and progeny ==
Arms of Peverell of Sampford Peverell, Devon: Azure, three garbs argent a chief or

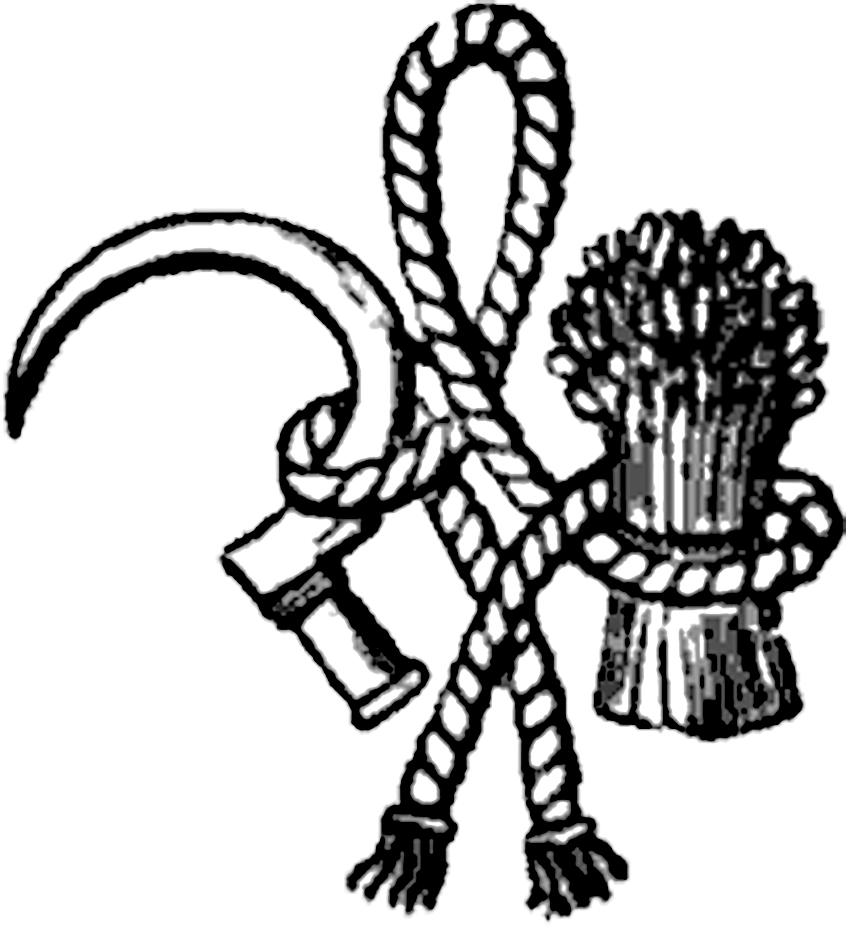
The marriage of Sir Walter Hungerford to Catherine Peverell is symbolised in a heraldic badge showing the Hungerford knot uniting the Hungerford sickle and the Peverell garb, the latter a badge of the ancient Peverel family, feudal barons of Peverel (or of "the Peak") in Derbyshire

Hungerford married twice:

- Firstly to Catherine (or Eleanor) Peverell, daughter of Sir Thomas Peverell, MP, of Parke and Hamatethy, Cornwall (a cadet branch of Peverell of Sampford Peverell in Devon) by his wife Margaret Courtenay (1355–1422) one of the two daughters and eventual sole heiresses of Sir Thomas Courtenay (died 1356) of Wootton Courtenay in Somerset and of Woodhuish, Devon, by whom he had three sons and at least one daughter:
  - Walter Hungerford, eldest son and heir apparent, who was made a prisoner of war in France in 1425, was ransomed by his father for three thousand marks, was in the retinue of John of Lancaster, 1st Duke of Bedford in France in 1435, and predeceased his father without issue.
  - Robert Hungerford, 2nd Baron Hungerford, eldest surviving son and heir.
  - Edmund Hungerford, who was knighted by Henry VI after the Battle of Verneuil on Whit-Sunday 1426, and married Margaret Burnell, daughter and co-heiress of Edward Burnell, by whom he had two sons:
    - Thomas Hungerford, ancestor of the Hungerfords of Down Ampney in Gloucestershire, of the Hungerfords of Windrush, Oxfordshire and of the Hungerfords of Black Bourton, Oxfordshire.
    - Edward Hungerford, ancestor of the Hungerfords of Cadenham, Wiltshire.
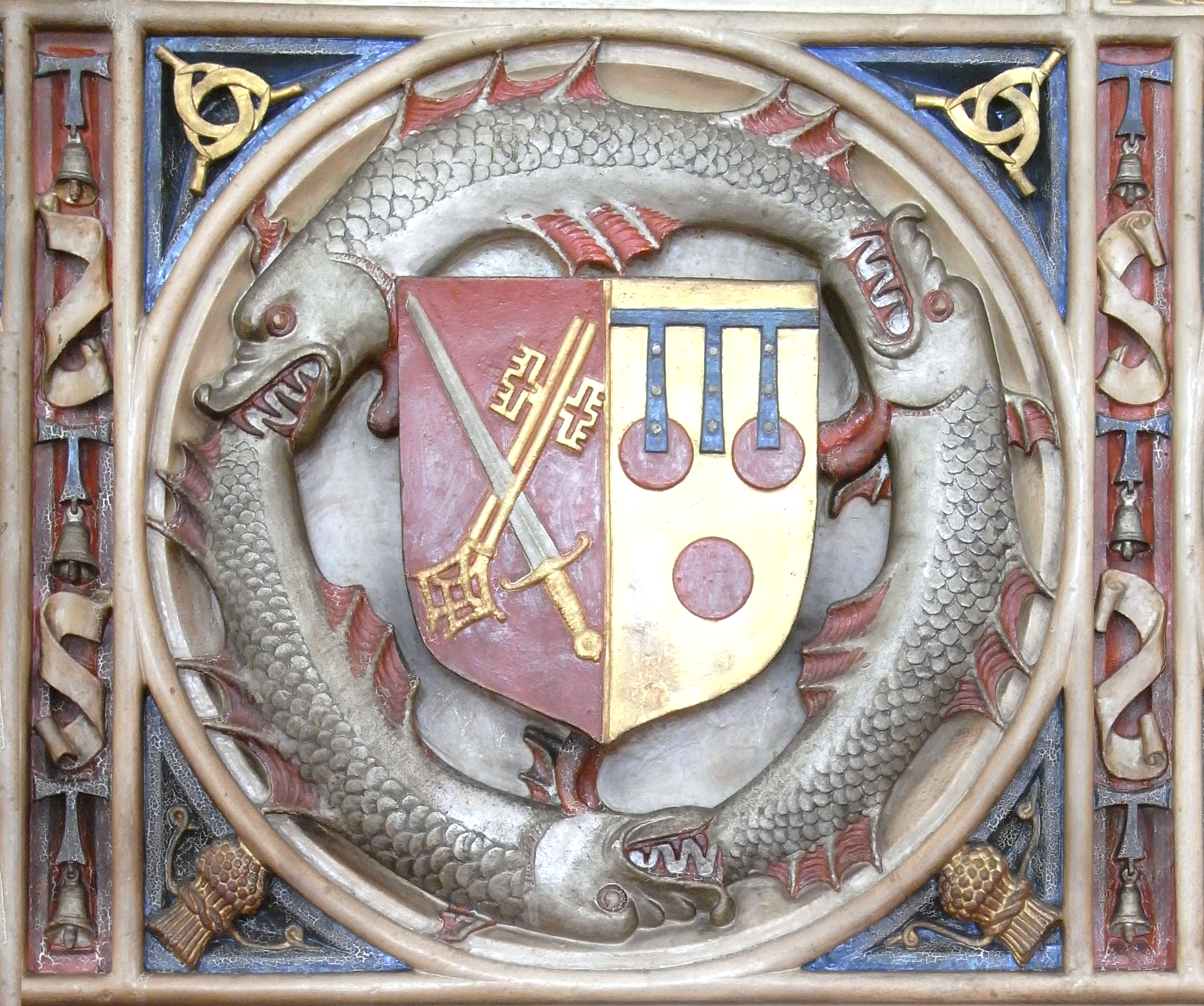
      Arms of Bishop Peter Courtenay (d.1492), showing the arms of the See of Exeter impaling Courtenay of Powderham, incorporating heraldic badges of dolphins of Courtenay of Powderham and in the spandrels, Hungerford sickles and Peverell garbs. Detail from the Courtenay Mantelpiece, Bishop's Palace, Exeter
  - Elizabeth Hungerford (died 14 December 1476), who married Sir Philip Courtenay (1404–1463) of Powderham, Devon. On her marriage she took to her husband as her marriage portion the manor of Molland in North Devon, which she gave to her second son Sir Philip Courtenay of Molland (died 1488), who founded a junior branch of the Courtenay family there. A fragment of an ancient chest tomb in Molland Church displays heraldic motifs of two interlaced Hungerford sickles and a dolphin of Courtenay of Powderham. Her third son was Peter Courtenay (c.1432–1492), Bishop of Exeter and Bishop of Winchester, whose splendid surviving mantelpiece in the Bishop's Palace, Exeter displays much heraldry including Hungerford sickles and Peverell garbs.
- Secondly he married Eleanor Berkeley (died 1 August 1455), daughter of Sir John Berkeley of Beverstone Castle, Gloucestershire (by his second wife, Elizabeth Betteshorne). Eleanor was a widow successively of John FitzAlan, 13th Earl of Arundel (died 1421) and of Sir Richard Poynings (died 1429). Walter Hungerford and Eleanor de Berkeley were without progeny.

== Death and burial ==
Hungerford died on 9 August 1449 and was buried beside his first wife in Salisbury Cathedral, where two beautiful mortuary chapels erected by the Hungerford family stood until removed and destroyed by the restorations of James Wyatt in 1790. William Hamilton Rogers (1877) wrote as follows concerning the monument:

"He was buried with his wife in the Hungerford Chapel in the nave, a beautiful structure composed chiefly of iron and which has since been removed to the choir. Their tombs, joined together and despoiled of their brass effigies, remain in the nave. The matrices exhibit the proportions of a knight on the one and of a lady on the other, both stones were powdered over with sickles and a ledger line outside all. The whole has now disappeared, except the stones in which the brasses were set. Forty shields of arms, according to Hutchins (who minutely describes these chapels previous to their removal) were set round outside exhibiting the various alliances of the family. Among these were Hungerford impaling Strange and Mohun, Peverell, Courtenay, St John, Mules, etc". (Note: The heraldry was also described at length by Richard Symonds in his Diary of the Marches of the Royal Army, (1644).)

== Benefactions ==
By his marriages and royal grants Hungerford added largely to the family estates. He built chantries at Heytesbury and Chippenham, and made bequests to Salisbury Cathedral and to Bath Cathedral. In 1428 he presented valuable estates to the Royal Chapel in the Palace of Westminster. He founded an almshouse in 1442 at Heytesbury for twelve poor men and one woman, with a schoolmaster's residence; after being re-endowed by Margaret de Botreaux, widow of his son Robert, and then rebuilt in 1769 after a fire, the charity continues today as the Hospital of St John.

In his will he left to his daughter-in-law, Margaret de Botreaux (wife of Sir Robert Hungerford, 2nd Baron), his "best legend of the Lives of the Saints" and to John, Viscount Beaumont he bequeathed a cup formerly used by John of Gaunt.

In 1407 Hungerford donated the advowson of the church at his manor of Rushall in Wiltshire to the canons of Longleat Priory, who were struggling to support themselves financially.

== Notes ==
Political offices
Preceded by John Doreward	Speaker of the House of Commons; 1414–1415	Succeeded by Thomas Chaucer
Preceded by John Stafford	Lord High Treasurer; 1426–1432	Succeeded by The Lord Scrope of Masham
