= John Roches =

Member of the Parliament of England

Admiral Sir John Roches
- Born: 1333; Bromham, Wiltshire, England
- Died: 30 September 1400 (aged 66–67); London, England
- Military career
- Allegiance: England
- Branch: Royal Navy
- Service years: 1381–1389
- Rank: Admiral
- Commands: Admiral of the North and West; Admiral of the West

Sir John Roches

Member of Parliament for Wiltshire
- Incumbent
- Assumed office 1381, 1384, 1390, 1394, 1399

Sir John Roches (c.1333–1400), of Bromham, Wiltshire, was an English admiral, diplomat, magistrate and politician.

== Political career ==
He was made Ambassador to the Kingdom of Aragon from 30 October 1377 to 4 May 1378, and again from 20 June 1378. He was then elected as Member (MP) of the Parliament of England for Wiltshire in 1381, and again in May 1382, October 1382, February 1383, April 1384, November 1390, 1394, January 1397 and 1399.

== Naval career ==
He was first appointed Admiral to the West, a senior command of the English Navy, from 22 May 1381 to 23 November 1383. He was then given the post of Admiral of the North and Western Fleets from 21 May to 22 June 1389. He served both offices under Richard II.

== Offices held ==
His offices included:

- Surveyor of the Forests of Chippenham, Melksham and Pewsham, all in Wiltshire, 5 December 1373.
- Ambassador to the Kingdom of Aragon, 30 October 1377 to 4 May 1378 and 20 June 1378.
- Joint Warden, of Savernake Forest, Wiltshire, 28 June 1381 to c.1382.
- Keeper of Marlborough Castle and Surveyor of Savernake Forest, 28 March 1382 until his death.
- Admiral of the West, 22 May 1382 to 23 November 1383.
- Admiral of the North and West, 21 May to 22 June 1389.
- Justice of the Peace, Wiltshire 20 Dec. 1382-Mar. 1386, 28 June-Nov. 1396.
- Deputy Marshal of England, before March 1385, and January to March 1394.
- Captain of Brest, by 8 January 1386 to May 1388.
- Alnager of Wiltshire, 20 November 1388 to 8 March 1389.
- Sheriff of Wiltshire, 7 November 1390 to 21 October 1391.

== Family ==
John Roche(s) married Willelma de la Mare (1365–1410), sole heiress of Robert de la Mare (1314–1382) of Steeple/Market Lavington, Wiltshire; by his wife Maud de Hastings (died 1405). They had two daughters: first co-heir Elizabeth Roche (1385–1447) married Walter Beauchamp (d. 1430), son of William Beauchamp. The other daughter, Joan, married to Nicholas Baynton, son of Nicholas Baynton by Joan Daundeley. They had a son, John Baynton (born 1406) who was the second co-heir.
