= Bad Parliament =

1377 English parliament

←	Good Parliament	1st Parliament of King Richard II	→

Overview
- Legislative body: Parliament of England
- Term: 27 January 1377 – 2 March 1377

The Bad Parliament sat in England between 27 January and 2 March 1377. The initial summons for the parliament went out on 1 December 1376, and the writ dissolving it was dated 2 March 1377.

== History ==
The Bad Parliament was the last parliament of King Edward III of England's reign. Influenced by Edward's son John of Gaunt, it undid the work done by the Good Parliament to reduce corruption in the Royal Council. It approved Gaunt's reversal of the Good Parliament's impeachment of a number of royal courtiers. It also introduced a poll tax, a new form of royal taxation.

Modern historians have rejected the earlier view that the parliament was packed with Gaunt's supporters, and instead argued that a few defections to the royal party as well as the absence of other supporters of the Good Parliament were responsible for the complete change of course from the Good Parliament's work. The Bad Parliament, much like an earlier parliament of Edward III's in 1341, was forced to accede to the fact that the king could renege on political promises that were forced upon him. The poll tax was assessed at the rate of 4 pennies for every person over the age of 14. The idea for the tax came from the Commons and was an attempt to move taxation down the social scale. A similar, but heavier, tax was a contributing factor to the Peasants' Revolt in 1381. The Bad Parliament also approved the payment of 6,000 pounds of back salary owed to Gaunt.

The speaker was Sir Thomas Hungerford, who is the first leader of Commons to be called "speaker" in the rolls of Parliament. Hungerford was Gaunt's steward and his selection as speaker showed Gaunt's power over the parliament.

The ability of Gaunt and the royal government to not only secure approval of their reversal of the impeachments done by the Good Parliament along with the imposition of a new tax was a sign of the strength of the royal administration. Gaunt's ability to get back wages also demonstrated his increased power in the last year of his father's reign.

During the parliament, the Commons met in the Chapter House of Westminster Abbey. Between the sessions of the Good Parliament and of the Bad Parliament, the Commons wore out the floor coverings in the Chapter House due to the length of their deliberations.

== See also ==
- List of parliaments of England
