= List of MPs elected to the English parliament in 1625 =

This is a list of members of Parliament (MPs) elected to the first parliament in the reign of King Charles I in 1625, which was known as the Useless Parliament.

The first parliament began on 21 June 1625 and was held to 11 July 1625 when it adjourned to Oxford because of fear of plague in London. It then sat from 1 August 1625 to 12 August 1625 when it was dissolved. It gained its name because it transacted no significant business, but it was most 'useless' from the king's point of view.

== List of constituencies and members ==
=== Bedfordshire ===
Constituency	Members	Notes
Bedfordshire	Oliver St John; Sir Oliver Luke	
Bedford	Sir Beauchamp St John; Richard Taylor	
=== Berkshire ===
Constituency	Members	Notes
Berkshire	Edmund Dunch; Sir Francis Knollys	
Windsor	William Russell; Humphrey Newbury	
Reading	Francis Knollys junior John Saunders	
Wallingford	Sir Anthony Forrest; Michael Molyns	
Abingdon	Robert Knollys	
=== Buckinghamshire ===
Constituency	Members	Notes
Buckinghamshire	Sir Francis Goodwin; Henry Bulstrode	
Buckingham	Sir Alexander Denton; Richard Oliver	
Wycombe	Henry Coke; Thomas Lane	
Aylesbury	Sir Robert Carr; Sir John Hare	
Amersham	John Crew; Francis Drake	
Wendover	John Hampden; Sir Sampson Darrell	
Marlow	John Backhouse; Thomas Cotton	
=== Cambridgeshire ===
Constituency	Members	Notes
Cambridgeshire	Sir Edward Peyton, 2nd Baronet; Sir John Cutts	
Cambridge University	Sir Robert Naunton; Sir Albert Morton	Morton also elected for Kent
Cambridge	Talbot Pepys; Thomas Meautys	
=== Cheshire ===
Constituency	Members	Notes
Cheshire	Robert Cholmondeley; Sir Anthony St John	
City of Chester	Edward Whitby; John Savage	
=== Cornwall ===
Constituency	Members	Notes
Cornwall	Charles Trevanion; Sir Robert Killigrew	
Launceston	Bevil Grenville; Richard Scott	
Liskeard	William Coryton; Nicholas Hele	
Lostwithiel	Sir Henry Vane; Nicholas Kendall; Sir George Chudleigh, 1st Baronet; Reginald Mohun	Double return
Truro	William Rous; Henry Rolle	
Bodmin	Robert Caesar; Henry Jermyn	
Helston	Francis Carew; Thomas Carey	
Saltash	Francis Buller; Sir Richard Buller	
Camelford	Sir Henry Hungate; Thomas Cotteel	
Grampound	John Mohun; Sir Samuel Rolle	
Eastlow	Sir James Bagge; Sir Thomas Trevor	
Westlow	Sir John Wolstenholme, 1st Baronet; Edward Thomas	
Penryn	Edward Roberts; Sir Edwin Sandys	
Tregoney	Sir Henry Carey; Sebastian Goode	
Bossiney	Sir Francis Cottington Bt; Jonathan Prideaux	
St Ives	Sir William Parkhurst; Sir Francis Godolphin	
Fowey	Arthur Basset; Jonathan Rashleigh	
St Germans	Sir John Coke; Sir Henry Martin	
Mitchell	Henry Sandys; Sir John Smith	
Newport	Sir John Eliot; Ralph Speccot	
St Mawes	Sir James Fullerton; Nathaniel Tomkins	
Callington	Sir Richard Weston; Thomas Wise	
=== Cumberland ===
Constituency	Members	Notes
Cumberland	Sir George Dalston; Sir Patricius Curwen Bart	
Carlisle	Sir Henry Vane; Edward Aglionby	
=== Derbyshire ===
Constituency	Members	Notes
Derbyshire	William Lord Cavendish; John Stanhope	
Derby	Sir Edward Leech; Timothy Leeving (Recorder)	
=== Devon ===
Constituency	Members	Notes
Devon	Sir Francis Fulford; Francis Courtenay	
Exeter	Ignatius Jordan; Nicholas Duck	
Totnes	Sir Edward Seymour, 2nd Baronet; Sir Edward Giles	
Plymouth	John Glanville; Thomas Sherville (merchant)	
Barnstaple	Pentecost Dodderidge; John Delbridge	
Plympton Erle	Sir Warwick Hele; Sir William Strode	
Tavistock	John Pym; Sir Francis Glanville	
Clifton Dartmouth Hardness	John Upton; Roger Matthew (Merchant)	
Bere Alston	Sir Thomas Cheek; William Strode	
Tiverton	Sir Rowland St John; John Francis	
=== Dorset ===
Constituency	Members	Notes
Dorset	Sir Walter Erle; Sir Nathaniel Napier	
Poole	Sir John Cooper; John Pyne	
Dorchester	Sir Francis Ashley; William Whiteway	
Lyme Regis	John Drake; Thomas Paramour	
Weymouth and Melcombe Regis	Sir John Strangways; Thomas Middleton; Arthur Pyne; Bernard Michell	Middleton chosen for Denbighshire and replaced by Giles Green
Bridport	Lewis Dyve; Sir John Strode	
Shaftesbury	John Thoroughgood; William Whitaker	
Wareham	Sir William Pitt; John Trenchard	
Corfe Castle	Sir Peter Osborne; Sir Francis Nethersale	
=== Essex ===
Constituency	Members	Notes
Essex	Sir Francis Barrington Bt; Sir Arthur Harris	
Colchester	William Towse; Sir Robert Quarles	
Maldon	Sir William Masham, 1st Baronet; Sir Henry Mildmay	
Harwich	Sir Edmund Sawyer; Christopher Harris	
=== Gloucestershire ===
Constituency	Members	Notes
Gloucestershire	Sir Maurice Berkeley; John Dutton	Browne Willis gives Sir Robert Tracy and Sir Robert Pointz
Gloucester	Christopher Caple; John Browne	
Cirencester	Sir Miles Sandys; Henry Poole	
Tewkesbury	Sir Dudley Diggs; Sir Baptist Hicks	
=== Hampshire ===
Constituency	Members	Notes
Hampshire	Robert Wallop; Sir Henry Whitehead	
Winchester	Richard Tichborne; Sir Thomas Phelips	
Southampton	Sir John Mill, 1st Baronet; George Gallop	
Portsmouth	Sir Benjamin Rudyerd; Sir Daniel Norton	
Petersfield	Sir John Jephson; William Uvedale	
Yarmouth	Edward Clarke; John Oglander	Clarke sat for Hythe - replaced by Sir John Suckling
Newport	Sir Nathaniel Rich; Philip Fleming	
Stockbridge	Sir Richard Gifford; Sir Thomas Badger	
Newtown	Sir Thomas Barrington, 2nd Baronet; Thomas Malet	
Lymington	John Button; John Mills	
Christchurch	Nathaniel Tomkins; Sir Thomas Wilford	
Whitchurch	Robert Wallop; Sir Robert Oxenbridge	
Andover	Sir Henry Wallop; Henry Shuter	
=== Herefordshire ===
Constituency	Members	Notes
Herefordshire	John Rudhale; Sir Giles Brydges, 1st Baronet	
Hereford	James Clerke; Richard Weaver	
Leominster	James Tompkins; Edward Littleton	
=== Hertfordshire ===
Constituency	Members	Notes
Hertfordshire	Sir John Boteler; John Boteler	
St Albans	Sir Charles Morrison, 1st Baronet; John Laken	
Hertford	William Ashton; Thomas Fanshawe	
=== Huntingdonshire ===
Constituency	Members	Notes
Huntingdonshire	Edward Montagu; Sir Oliver Cromwell	
Huntingdon	Sir Arthur Mainwaring; Sir Henry St John	
=== Kent ===
Constituency	Members	Notes
Kent	Mildmay Lord Buckhurst; Sir Albert Morton	Morton also elected for Cambridge University
Canterbury	John Fisher; Sir Thomas Wilsford	
Rochester	Henry Clerke (Sir) Thomas Walsingham	
Maidstone	Edward Mapleton; Thomas Stanley	
Queenborough	Roger Palmer; Edward Hales	
=== Lancashire ===
Constituency	Members	Notes
Lancashire	Sir Richard Molyneux, Bt; Sir John Ratcliffe	
Preston	Sir William Harvey; Henry Banister	
Lancaster	Sir Humphrey May; Sir Thomas Fanshawe	
Newton	Sir Miles Fleetwood; Sir Henry Edmonds	
Wigan	Francis Downes; Edward Bridgeman	
Clitheroe	Sir Ralph Assheton; William Fanshawe	
Liverpool	James Lord Strange; Edward Moore	
=== Leicestershire ===
Constituency	Members	Notes
Leicestershire	Ferdinando Lord Hastings; Sir Wolstan Dixie	
Leicester	Thomas Jermyn; Sir Humphrey May	May chosen for Lancaster and replaced by Sir George Hastings
=== Lincolnshire ===
Constituency	Members	Notes
Lincolnshire	Sir John Wray, 2nd Baronet; Sir Nicholas Saunderson Bt	
Lincoln	Sir Thomas Grantham; John Monson	
Boston	Sir Edward Barkham; William Boswell	
Grimsby	Henry Pelham; Sir Christopher Wray	
Stamford	Montagu Bertie; John St Amand	
Grantham	Sir George Manners; Sir William Airmine	
=== Middlesex ===
Constituency	Members	Notes
Middlesex	Sir John Franklyn; Sir Gilbert Gerard	
Westminster	Sir Edward Villiers; William Mann	
City of London	Sir Thomas Middleton; Heneage Finch; Robert Bateman; Martin Bond	
=== Monmouthshire ===
Constituency	Members	Notes
Monmouthshire	Robert Viscount Lisle; Sir William Morgan	
Monmouth Boroughs	Walter Stewart	
=== Norfolk ===
Constituency	Members	Notes
Norfolk	Sir Edward Coke; Sir Edmund Bacon	
Norwich	William Denny; Sir Thomas Hyrne	
King's Lynn	Thomas Gurling (merchant); John Cooke (merchant)	
Yarmouth	Sir John Corbet; Edward Owner	
Thetford	Sir Robert Cotton, 1st Baronet, of Connington; Framlingham Gawdy	
Castle Rising	Sir Hamon le Strange; Sir Thomas Bancroft	
=== Northamptonshire ===
Constituency	Members	Notes
Northamptonshire	Sir William Spencer; Richard Knightley	
Peterborough	Laurence Whitacre; Christopher Hatton	
Northampton	Richard Spencer; Christopher Sherland	
Brackley	Sir Thomas Wenman; Edward Spencer	
Higham Ferrers	Charles Montagu	
=== Northumberland ===
Constituency	Members	Notes
Northumberland	Sir John Fenwick; Sir Francis Brandling	
Newcastle	Sir Thomas Ridell; Sir Henry Anderson	
Morpeth	Sir Thomas Reynell; Sir Anthony Herbert	
Berwick upon Tweed	Sir Robert Jackson; Sir John Selby	
=== Nottinghamshire ===
Constituency	Members	Notes
Nottinghamshire	Sir Gervase Clifton; John Stanhope	
Nottingham	Robert Greaves; John Martyn	
East Retford	John Lord Haughton; Sir Francis Wortley, 1st Baronet	
=== Oxfordshire ===
Constituency	Members	Notes
Oxfordshire	Edward Wray; Sir Richard Wenman	
Oxford University	Sir Thomas Edmondes; John Danvers	
Oxford	John Whistler; Thomas Wentworth	
Woodstock	Sir Philip Cary; Sir Gerard Fleetwood	
Banbury	Hon. James Fiennes	
=== Rutland ===
Constituency	Members	Notes
Rutland	William Bulstrode; Sir Guy Palmes	
=== Salop ===
Constituency	Members	Notes
Shropshire	Sir Richard Newport; Sir Andrew Corbet	
Shrewsbury	Sir William Owen; Thomas Owen	
Bridgnorth	Sir William Whitmore; George Vernon	
Ludlow	Richard Tomlins; Ralph Goodwin	
Wenlock	Thomas Lawley; Sir Thomas Wolryche, 1st Baronet	
Bishops Castle	William Oakley; Edward Waring	
=== Somerset ===
Constituency	Members	Notes
Somerset	John Stawell; Sir Robert Phelips	
Bristol	Nicholas Hyde; John Whitson	
Bath	Ralph Hopton; Edward Hungerford	
Wells	Sir Edward Rodney; Sir Thomas Lake	
Taunton	Thomas Brereton; Sir Hugh Portman, 4th Baronet	
Bridgwater	Sir Arthur Lake; Edward Popham	
Minehead	Charles Pyne; Francis Lutterell	
Ilchester	Sir Robert Gage; Richard Wynn	
=== Staffordshire ===
Constituency	Members	Notes
Staffordshire	Sir Simon Weston; Richard Erdeswick	
Lichfield	Sir Richard Dyott; William Wingfield	
Stafford	Matthew Cradock; Sir Robert Hatton	Hatton chose to sit for Sandwich - replaced by Sir John Offley
Newcastle under Lyme	Edward Mainwaring; John Keeling	
Tamworth	Sir Thomas Puckering Bt; Sir Richard Skeffington	
=== Suffolk ===
Constituency	Members	Notes
Suffolk	Sir Edmund Bacon, 2nd Baronet; Thomas Cornwallis	
Ipswich	Robert Snelling; William Cage	
Dunwich	Sir John Rous; Sir Robert Brooke	
Orford	Sir Robert Hitcham; Sir William Whitepole	
Eye	Francis Finch; Sir Roger North	
Aldeburgh	Sir Thomas Glemham; Charles Glemham	
Sudbury	Sir Nathaniel Barnardiston; Sir Robert Crane, 1st Baronet	
Bury St Edmunds	Sir Thomas Jermyn; Sir William Spring	
=== Surrey ===
Constituency	Members	Notes
Surrey	Sir George More; Sir Francis Leigh	
Southwark	Richard Yarward; William Coxe	
Bletchingly	Edward Bysshe; Thomas Gresham	
Reigate	Sir Thomas Bludder; Rogr James	
Guildford	Sir Robert More; Robert Parkhurst, jnr	
Gatton	Sir Charles Howard; Sir Thomas Crewe	Crewe Speaker
Haslemere	Sir Francis Carew; Poynings More	
=== Sussex ===
Constituency	Members	Notes
Sussex	Sir Thomas Pelham, 2nd Baronet; Sir John Shurley	
Chichester	Algernon Lord Peircy; Humphrey Haggett	
Horsham	John Borough; John Middleton.	
Midhurst	Richard Lewknor; Samuel Owfield	
Lewes	Sir George Goring; Sir George Rivers	
New Shoreham	Anthony Stapley; William Marlott	
Bramber	Walter Barttelot; Thomas Bowyer	
Steyning	Sir Edward Fraunceys; Sir Thomas Farnefold	
East Grinstead	Sir Henry Compton; Robert Heath	
Arundel	Sir Henry Spiller; William Hill	
=== Warwickshire ===
Constituency	Members	Notes
Warwickshire	Sir Thomas Lucy; Sir Clement Throckmorton	
Coventry	Henry Harwell; Sir Edward Coke	
Warwick	Sir Francis Leigh, Bt. Francis Lucy	
=== Westmorland ===
Constituency	Members	Notes
Westmorland	Sir John Lowther; Sir Henry Bellingham	
Appleby	Sir John Hotham, 1st Baronet; Thomas Hughes	Hotham chose to sit for Beverley - not replaced
=== Wiltshire ===
Constituency	Members	Notes
Wiltshire	Sir Francis Seymour; Sir Henry Ley	
Salisbury	Henry Sherfield (Recorder); Sir Walter Long, 1st Baronet	
Wilton	Sir Thomas Morgan; Sir William Harrington	
Downton	Sir Clipsby Crew; Edward Herbert	
Hindon	Sir Thomas Thynne; Thomas Lambert	
Heytesbury	Sir Charles Berkeley; Edward Byshe	
Westbury	Sir Walter Long; Gifford Long	
Calne	Sir Edward Howard; George Lowe (senior)	
Chippenham	Sir John Maynard; Sir Francis Popham	
Devizes	Edward Bayntun; Robert Drew	
Malmesbury	Sir Henry Moody; Sir Edward Wardour	
Cricklade	Sir William Howard; Edward Dowse	
Ludgershall	Robert Pye; Sir Thomas Hinton	BW corrigenda gives other member as Sir Thomas Jaye
Great Bedwyn	Sir John Brooke; William Cholmeley	
Old Sarum	Michael Oldisworth; Sir John Stradling	
Wootton Bassett	Robert Hyde; Sir Walter Tichborne	
Marlborough	Richard Digges; Edward Kyrton	
=== Worcestershire ===
Constituency	Members	Notes
Worcestershire	Sir Thomas Lyttelton, 1st Baronet; William Russell	
Worcester	Sir Walter Devereux; Sir Henry Spelman	
Droitwich	John Wilde; John Coventry	
Evesham	Richard Cresheld; Anthony Langston	
Bewdley	Ralph Clare	
=== Yorkshire ===
Constituency	Members	Notes
Yorkshire	Sir Thomas Wentworth, Bt; Sir Thomas Fairfax	
York	Sir Arthur Ingram; Christopher Brooke	
Kingston upon Hull	John Lister; Maurice Abbot	
Knaresborough	Sir Richard Hutton; Sir Henry Slingsby	
Scarborough	Hugh Cholmeley; William Thompson	
Ripon	William Mallory; Sir Thomas Posthumous Hoby	
Richmond	Christopher Wandesford; Sir Talbot Bowes	
Hedon	Sir Thomas Fairfax of Walton; Christopher Hilliard	
Boroughbridge	Sir Ferdinando Fairfax; William Mainwaring	
Thirsk	Henry Belasyse; Henry Stanley	
Aldborough	Richard Aldborough; John Carvile	
Beverley	Sir John Hotham Bt; Sir William Alford	
Pontefract	Sir John Jackson; Richard Beaumont	
=== Cinque Ports ===
Constituency	Members	Notes
Hastings	Nicholas Eversfield; Sackville Crowe	
Romney	Sir Edmund Verney; Richard Godfrey	
Hythe	Sir Edward Dering, 1st Baronet; Edward Clarke	
Dover	John Hippisley; William Beecher	
Sandwich	Sir Henry Wotton; Sir Robert Hatton	
Rye	Thomas Fotherby; John Sackville	
Winchelsea	Roger Twysden; Sir Ralph Freeman	
=== Wales ===
Constituency	Members	Notes
Anglesey	Sir Sackville Trevor	
Beaumaris	Charles Jones	
Brecknockshire	Charles Vaughan	
Brecknock	Walter Pye	
Cardiganshire	James Lewis	
Cardigan	Rowland Pugh	
Carmarthenshire	(Sir) Richard Vaughan	
Carmarthen	Henry Vaughan	
Carnarvonshire	Thomas Glynn	
Carnarvon	Edward Littleton	Littleton chose for Leominster - replaced by Robert Jones
Denbighshire	Thomas Myddelton	
Denbigh Boroughs	Sir Hugh Middleton, 1st Baronet	
Flintshire	Sir John Trevor	
Flint	William Ravenscroft	
Glamorgan	Sir Robert Mansell	
Cardiff	William Price	
Merioneth	Henry Wynn	
Montgomeryshire	William Herbert	Herbert replaced by Sir Thomas Middleton
Montgomery	George Herbert	
Pembrokeshire	John Wogan	
Pembroke	Lewis Powell	
Haverford West	Sir Thomas Canon	
Radnorshire	James Price	
Radnor	Charles Price	

== See also ==
- List of parliaments of England
- Useless Parliament
