= List of MPs elected to the English parliament in 1624 =

This is a list of members of Parliament (MPs) elected to the last parliament in the reign of King James I in 1624, which was known as the Happy Parliament.

The parliament began on 19 February 1624 and was held to 24 May 1624. It then sat from 2 November 1624 to 16 February 1625 and was dissolved on the death of the King on 14 March 1625.

== List of constituencies and members ==
In 1624 the constituencies of Amersham, Great Marlow, Wendover and Hertford were re-enfranchised after the Committee of Privileges investigated abuses where the right of boroughs to return burgesses had fallen into disuse.

=== Bedfordshire ===
Constituency	Members	Notes
Bedfordshire	Oliver St John; Sir Oliver Luke	
Bedford	Sir Alexander St John; Richard Taylor	
=== Berkshire ===
Constituency	Members	Notes
Berkshire	Edmund Dunch; Sir Richard Harrison	
Windsor	Sir Edmund Sawyer; Thomas Woodward	Woodward replaced by Sir William Hewett
Reading	Francis Knollys junior John Saunders	
Wallingford	Sir Edward Howard; Sir George Simeon	Howard sat for Calne - replaced by Sir Anthony Forrest
Abingdon	Robert Knollys	
=== Buckinghamshire ===
Constituency	Members	Notes
Buckinghamshire	Sir William Fleetwood; Sir Thomas Denton	
Buckingham	Sir Edmund Verney; Richard Oliver	
Wycombe	Henry Coke; Arthur Goodwin	
Aylesbury	Sir John Pakington, 1st Baronet; Thomas Crewe	Pakington died - replaced by Sir Robert Carr; Crewe was Speaker
Amersham	John Crew; William Hakewill	Restored constituency - in BW corrigenda
Wendover	John Hampden; Sir Alexander Denton	Restored constituency - in BW corrigenda
Marlow	Henry Borlase; Thomas Cotton	Restored constituency - in BW corrigenda
=== Cambridgeshire ===
Constituency	Members	Notes
Cambridgeshire	Sir Simon Steward; Sir John Cutts	Steward replaced by Sir Edward Peyton, 2nd Baronet
Cambridge University	Sir Robert Naunton; Barnaby Gough	
Cambridge	Francis Brakyn; Robert Luckyn	
=== Cheshire ===
Constituency	Members	Notes
Cheshire	William Booth; William Brereton	
City of Chester	Edward Whitby; John Savage	
=== Cornwall ===
Constituency	Members	Notes
Cornwall	William Coryton; Bevil Grenville	
Launceston	Sir Francis Crane; Sir Miles Fleetwood	BW corrigenda adds Sir to Fleetwood
Liskeard	William Wrey; Nicholas Hele	
Lostwithiel	Sir John Hobart; Sir John Chichester	
Truro	Richard Daniel; Thomas Burgess	
Bodmin	Thomas Stafford; Charles Berkeley	
Helston	Francis Carew; Thomas Carey	
Saltash	Francis Buller; Sir Thomas Trevor	
Camelford	Edward Hare; Sir Francis Cottington Bt	
Grampound	John Mohun; Richard Edgecumbe	
Eastlow	Sir John Walter; Bartholemew Specot	
Westlow	George Mynn; James Bagg	
Penryn	Edward Roberts; Sir Robert Killigrew	
Tregoney	Peter Specot; Ambrose Manaton	
Bossiney	Sir Richard Weston; Thomas Bevans	
St Ives	William Lake; Sir Francis Godolphin	
Fowey	William Noy; Sir Robert Coke	
St Germans	Sir John Stradling, 1st Baronet; John Coke	
Mitchel	John Holles; John Sawle	John Holles replaced by Denzil Holles
Newport	Sir John Eliot; Richard Estcourt	
St Mawes	John Arundell; William Hockmere	
Callington	Sir Edward Seymour, 2nd Baronet; Henry Rolle	
=== Cumberland ===
Constituency	Members	Notes
Cumberland	Sir George Dalston; Ferdinando Huddleston	
Carlisle	Sir Henry Vane the Elder; Edward Aglionby	
=== Derbyshire ===
Constituency	Members	Notes
Derbyshire	William Lord Cavendish; John Stanhope	
Derby	Sir Edward Leech; Timothy Leeving (Recorder)	
=== Devon ===
Constituency	Members	Notes
Devon	Sir William Strode; John Drake	
Exeter	John Prowse; Nicholas Duck	
Totnes	Arthur Champernoun; Sir Edward Giles	
Plymouth	John Glanville; Thomas Sherville (merchant)	
Barnstaple	Pentecost Dodderidge; John Delbridge	
Plympton Erle	Sir Francis Drake, 1st Baronet; John Garret	
Tavistock	John Pym; Sampson Hele	
Clifton Dartmouth Hardness	William Plumley; Roger Matthew (Merchant)	
Bere Alston	Thomas Jermyn jun. Sir Thomas Cheek	Cheek chose to sit for Essex, replaced by William Strode
Tiverton	Sir George Chudleigh, 1st Baronet; Humphrey Were	
=== Dorset ===
Constituency	Members	Notes
Dorset	Sir John Strangways; Sir George Hussey	
Poole	Sir Walter Erle; Edward Pitt	
Dorchester	Richard Bushrode; William Whiteway	
Lyme Regis	Sir John Drake; William Wynn	
Weymouth and Melcombe Regis	John Freke; Arthur Pyne; Thomas Myddelton (younger); Henry Waltham (merchant)	
Bridport	Robert Browne; William Muschamp	
Shaftesbury	John Thoroughgood; William Whitaker	
Wareham	Sir William Pitt; John Trenchard	
Corfe Castle	Sir Peter Osborne; Sir Francis Nethersale	
=== Essex ===
Constituency	Members	Notes
Essex	Sir Francis Barrington Bt; Sir Thomas Cheek	
Colchester	William Towse; Edward Alford	
Maldon	Sir William Masham, 1st Baronet; Sir Arthur Harris	
Harwich	Sir Nathaniel Rich; Christopher Harris	
=== Gloucestershire ===
Constituency	Members	Notes
Gloucestershire	Thomas Estcourt; John Dutton	Estcourt died - replaced by Sir Maurice Berkeley
Gloucester	Anthony Robinson; John Browne	
Cirencester	Sir William Master; Henry Poole	
Tewkesbury	Sir Dudley Digges; Sir Baptist Hicks	
=== Hampshire ===
Constituency	Members	Notes
Hampshire	Sir Daniel Norton; Sir Robert Oxenbridge	
Winchester	Richard Tichborne; James Lord Wriothesley	
Southampton	Sir John Mill, 1st Baronet; Henry Sherfield	Sherfield chose to sit for Salisbury - replaced by John Bonde
Portsmouth	Sir William Uvedale; Sir Benjamin Rudyerd	
Yarmouth	Thomas Risley; William Beeston	
Petersfield	Sir John Jephson; Sir John Hippisley	
Newport	Philip Fleming; Christopher Brooke	Brooke chose to sit for York - replaced by John Danvers
Stockbridge	Sir Richard Gifford; Sir Henry Holcroft	
Newtown	Sir Gilbert Gerard, Bt; George Gerard	Sir Gilbert Gerard chose to sit for Middlesex - replaced by Sir Thomas Barrington, 2nd Baronet
Lymington	Nicholas Ferrar; John More	
Christchurch	Nathaniel Tomkins; Sir George Astmyll	
Whitchurch	Sir Henry Wallop; Thomas Jervoise	
Andover	Robert Wallop; John Shuter	
=== Herefordshire ===
Constituency	Members	Notes
Herefordshire	Sir John Scudamore; Sir Robert Harley	
Hereford	Sir James Clerke; Richard Weaver	
Leominster	James Tomkins; Sir William Beecher	
=== Hertfordshire ===
Constituency	Members	Notes
Hertfordshire	Sir Charles Morrison, 1st Baronet; William Lytton	
St Albans	Robert Kirkham; Sir John Jennings	
Hertford	William Ashton; Thomas Fanshawe	
=== Huntingdonshire ===
Constituency	Members	Notes
Huntingdonshire	Edward Montagu; Sir Oliver Cromwell	
Huntingdon	Sir Arthur Mainwaring; Sir Henry St John	
=== Kent ===
Constituency	Members	Notes
Kent	Sir Nicholas Tufton; Sir Edwin Sandys	
Canterbury	Thomas Scot; Thomas Denn	
Rochester	Sir Maximilian Dalyson (Sir) Thomas Walsingham (elder)	
Maidstone	Sir George Fane; Thomas Stanley	
Queenborough	Roger Palmer; Sir Robert Pooley	
=== Lancashire ===
Constituency	Members	Notes
Lancashire	Sir John Ratcliffe; Sir Thomas Walmisley	
Lancaster	John Selden; Sir Humphrey May	May sat for Leicester, replaced by Sir Thomas Fanshawe
Preston	Sir Edward Mosley; Sir William Pooley	Pooley sat for Sudbury, replaced by Sir William Hervey
Newton	Thomas Charnock; Edmund Breres	
Wigan	Sir Anthony St John; Francis Downes	
Clitheroe	William Fanshawe; Ralph Whitfield	
Liverpool	Sir Thomas Gerard, 2nd Baronet; George Ireland	
=== Leicestershire ===
Constituency	Members	Notes
Leicestershire	Sir Thomas Hesilrige, 1st Baronet; Sir Henry Hastings	
Leicester	Sir Humphrey May; William Ive	
=== Lincolnshire ===
Constituency	Members	Notes
Lincolnshire	Montagu Bertie; Sir Thomas Grantham	
Lincoln	Sir Lewis Watson, Bt; Thomas Hatcher	
Boston	Sir William Airmine; Sir Clement Cotterel	Cotterel chosen for Grantham replaced by William Boswell
Grimsby	Henry Pelham; Sir Christopher Wray	
Stamford	John St Amand; Sir George Goring	Sir George Goring, chosen for Lewes replaced by Edward Ayscough
Grantham	Sir George Manners; Sir Clement Cotterell	
=== Middlesex ===
Constituency	Members	Notes
Middlesex	Sir John Suckling; Sir Gilbert Gerard, Bt	
Westminster	Sir Edward Villiers; William Mann	
City of London	Sir Thomas Middleton; Heneage Finch; Robert Bateman; Martin Bond	
=== Monmouthshire ===
Constituency	Members	Notes
Monmouthshire	Robert Viscount Lisle; Sir William Morgan	
Monmouth Boroughs	Walter Stewart	
=== Norfolk ===
Constituency	Members	Notes
Norfolk	Sir Thomas Holland; Sir John Corbet	
Norwich	William Denny; Sir Thomas Hyrne	
King's Lynn	John Wallis (Alderman); William Doughty (Alderman)	
Yarmouth	George Hardware (Alderman); Benjamin Cooper	
Thetford	Framlingham Gawdy; Drue Drury	
Castle Rising	Sir Robert Spiller; Sir Thomas Bancroft	
=== Northamptonshire ===
Constituency	Members	Notes
Northamptonshire	Sir William Spencer; Richard Knightley	
Peterborough	Laurence Whitacre; Christopher Hatton	
Northampton	Richard Spencer; Christopher Sherland (Recorder)	
Brackley	Sir Thomas Wenman; Edward Spencer	
Higham Ferrers	Sir Charles Montagu	
=== Northumberland ===
Constituency	Members	Notes
Northumberland	Sir John Fenwick; Sir Francis Brandling	
Newcastle	Sir Peter Riddel; Sir Henry Anderson	
Morpeth	Sir Thomas Reynell; Sir William Carnaby	
Berwick upon Tweed	Sir Robert Jackson; Edward Lively	
=== Nottinghamshire ===
Constituency	Members	Notes
Nottinghamshire	Sir Gervase Clifton; Robert Sutton	
Nottingham	John Byron; Sir Charles Cavendish	BW corrigenda changes Byrom to Byron
East Retford	John Hollis; Sir Nathaniel Rich	Rich chosen at Harwich - replaced by John Darcy
=== Oxfordshire ===
Constituency	Members	Notes
Oxfordshire	Sir William Cope, 2nd Baronet; Sir Henry Poole	
Oxford University	Sir George Calvert; Sir Isaac Wake	
Oxford	John Whistler; Thomas Wentworth	
Woodstock	Philip Cary; William Lenthall	
Banbury	Sir Erasmus Dryden, 1st Baronet	
=== Rutland ===
Constituency	Members	Notes
Rutland	William Bulstrode; Sir Guy Palmes	
=== Salop ===
Constituency	Members	Notes
Shropshire	Sir Richard Newport; Sir Andrew Corbet	
Shrewsbury	Francis Berkeley; Thomas Owen	
Bridgnorth	Sir William Whitmore; George Smith	
Ludlow	Richard Tomlins; Ralph Goodwin	
Wenlock	Henry Mytton; Sir Thomas Wolryche, 1st Baronet	
Bishops Castle	Sir Robert Howard; Richard Oakeley	
=== Somerset ===
Constituency	Members	Notes
Somerset	John Symes; Sir Robert Phelips	
Bristol	John Barker; John Guy	
Bath	Sir Robert Pye; John Malet	
Wells	Thomas Southwood; Sir Edward Rodney	
Taunton	Thomas Brereton; Roger Prowse	
Bridgwater	Edward Popham; Roger Warre	
Minehead	Sir Arthur Lake; Arthur Duck	
Ilchester	Sir Richard Alleyn; Nathaniel Tomkins	Nathaniel Topkins, chosen for Christchurch replaced by Edmund Waller
=== Staffordshire ===
Constituency	Members	Notes
Staffordshire	Sir William Bowyer; Sir Edward Lyttelton	
Lichfield	Sir Simon Weston; Sir John Suckling	Suckling chosen for Middlesex replaced by William Wingfield
Stafford	Matthew Cradock; Sir Richard Dyott	
Newcastle under Lyme	Sir Edward Vere; Richard Leveson	Sir Edward Vere disabled and replaced 1624 by Charles Glemham
Tamworth	Sir Thomas Puckering Bt; John Ferrers	
=== Suffolk ===
Constituency	Members	Notes
Suffolk	Sir William Spring; Sir Roger North	
Ipswich	Sir Robert Snelling; William Cage	
Dunwich	Sir John Rous; Sir Robert Brooke	
Eye	Henry Crofts; Francis Finch	
Orford	Sir Robert Hitcham; William Glover	
Aldeburgh	Nicholas Ryvett; John Bence	
Sudbury	Sir Robert Crane, 1st Baronet; Sir William Pooley	
Bury St Edmunds	Sir Thomas Jermyn; Anthony Crofts	
=== Surrey ===
Constituency	Members	Notes
Surrey	Sir Robert More; Sir Thomas Grimes	
Southwark	Richard Yarward; Robert Bromfield	
Bletchingley	Edward Bysshe; Miles Fleetwood	Fleetwood sat for Launceston, replaced by John Hayward
Reigate	Sir Thomas Bludder; Robert Lewis	
Guildford	Sir George More; Nicholas Stoughton	
Gatton	Sir Edmund Bowyer; Samuel Owfield	
Haslemere	Francis Carew; Poynings More	
=== Sussex ===
Constituency	Members	Notes
Sussex	Algernon Lord Peircy; Thomas Pelham	
Chichester	Sir Thomas Edmondes; Thomas Whatman	
Horsham	John Borough; John Middleton	
Midhurst	Sir Anthony Manie; Richard Lewknor	
Lewes	Sir George Goring; Christopher Newell	
New Shoreham	Anthony Stapley; William Marlott	
Bramber	Robert Morley; Thomas Bowyer	
Steyning	Edward Fraunceys; Sir Thomas Farneford	
East Grinstead	Robert Heath; Thomas Caldicot	
Arundel	Sir Henry Spiller; Sir George Chaworth	Chaworth unseated on petition in 1624 and replaced by William Mill
=== Warwickshire ===
Constituency	Members	Notes
Warwickshire	Sir Thomas Lucy; Sir Clement Throckmorton	
Coventry	Henry Harwell; Sir Edward Coke (Recorder)	
Warwick	Sir Edward Conway; Francis Lucy	
=== Westmorland ===
Constituency	Members	Notes
Westmoreland	Sir John Lowther; Robert Strickland	
Appleby	Sir Arthur Ingram; Thomas Hughes	
=== Wiltshire ===
Constituency	Members	Notes
Wiltshire	Edward Hungerford; Sir John St John, 1st Baronet	
Salisbury	Henry Sherfield (Recorder); Roger Gauntlett	
Wilton	Sir Thomas Morgan; Sir Percy Hobart	
Downton	Sir William Dodington; Sir Clipsby Crew	
Hindon	Lawrence Hyde; Matthew Davies	
Heytesbury	Sir Thomas Thynne; Henry Ludlow	
Westbury	Sir John Saye; Sir Henry Mildmay	
Calne	Sir Edward Howard; John Duckett	
Chippenham	John Maynard; Sir Francis Popham	
Devizes	Edward Bayntun; John Kent	
Malmesbury	Sir Edward Wardour; Sir Thomas Hatton, 1st Baronet	
Cricklade	Sir William Howard; Sir Neville Poole	
Ludgershall	Edward Kyrton; William Sotwell	
Great Bedwyn	Hugh Crompton; William Cholmeley	
Old Sarum	Sir Robert Cotton, 1st Baronet, of Connington; Sir Arthur Ingram	Ingram chose to sit for York and replaced by Michael Oldisworth
Wootton Bassett	Sir Roland Egerton, 1st Baronet; John Bankes	
Marlborough	Sir Francis Seymour; Richard Digges	
=== Worcestershire ===
Constituency	Members	Notes
Worcestershire	Sir Walter Devereux; Sir Thomas Lyttelton, 1st Baronet	
Worcester	Robert Berkeley; John Coucher	
Droitwich	Walter Blount; John Wilde	
Evesham	Sir Edward Conway; Richard Cresheld	
Bewdley	Ralph Clare	
=== Yorkshire ===
Constituency	Members	Notes
Yorkshire	Sir John Savile; Sir Thomas Savile	
York	Sir Arthur Ingram; Christopher Brooke	
Kingston upon Hull	John Lister; Sir John Suckling	Sir John Suckling chosen for Middlesex replaced by Maurice Abbot
Knaresborough	Sir Richard Hutton; Sir Henry Slingsby	
Scarborough	Hugh Cholmeley; William Conyers	
Ripon	William Mallory; Sir Thomas Posthumous Hoby	
Richmond	John Wandesford; Christopher Pepper	
Hedon	Sir Thomas Fairfax of Walton; Sir Christopher Hilliard	
Boroughbridge	Sir Ferdinando Fairfax; Christopher Mainwaring	
Thirsk	Thomas Belasyse; Sir William Sheffield	
Aldborough	Christopher Wandesford; John Carvile	
Beverley	Sir Henry Vane the Elder; Edmund Scott	Vane chose to sit for Carlisle, replaced by Sir Henry Carey
Pontefract	Sir John Jackson; Sir Thomas Wentworth	
=== Cinque Ports ===
Constituency	Members	Notes
Hastings	Nicholas Eversfield; Samuel Moore	
Romney	Francis Fetherston; Richard Godfrey	
Hythe	Peter Heyman; Richard Zouche	
Dover	Sir Edward Cecil; Sir Richard Young	
Sandwich	Sir Robert Hatton; Francis Drake	
Rye	Thomas Conway; Sir Edward Conway	Sir Edward Conway — chosen for Warwick replaced by John Angell
Winchelsea	John Finch; Edward Nicholas	
=== Wales ===
Constituency	Members	Notes
Anglesey	John Mostyn	
Beaumaris	Charles Jones	
Brecknockshire	Sir Henry Williams	
Brecknock	Walter Pye	
Cardiganshire	James Lewis	
Cardigan	Rowland Pugh	
Carmarthenshire	(Sir) Richard Vaughan	
Carmarthen	Henry Vaughan	
Carnarvonshire	Thomas Glynn	
Carnarvon	Peter Mutton	
Denbighshire	Sir Eubule Thelwall	
Denbigh Boroughs	Sir Hugh Myddelton, 1st Baronet	
Flintshire	Sir John Hanmer, 1st Baronet	Hanmer died — replaced by Sir John Trevor
Flint	William Ravenscroft	
Glamorgan	Sir Robert Mansell	
Cardiff	William Price	
Merioneth	Henry Wynn	
Montgomeryshire	William Herbert	
Montgomery	George Herbert	
Pembrokeshire	James Perrot	
Pembroke	Sir Walter Devereux	
Haverford West	Lewis Powell	
Radnorshire	James Price	
Radnor	Charles Price	

== See also ==
- List of parliaments of England
- 4th Parliament of King James I
