= List of MPs elected to the English parliament in 1628 =

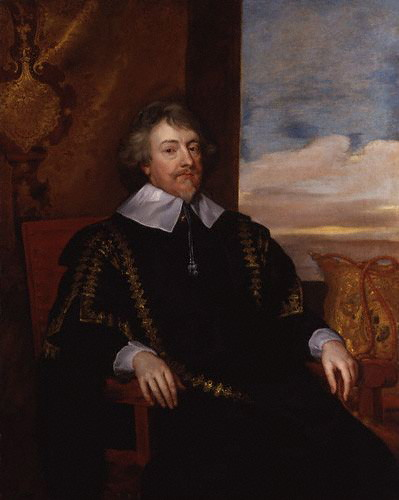
Sir John Finch – Speaker

This is a list of members of Parliament (MPs) elected to the third parliament in the reign of King Charles I in 1628.

The third parliament began on 16 March 1628 and was held to 26 June 1628. The second session of this parliament began at Westminster on 20 January 1629 and was held to 2 March 1629 when it was adjourned to 10 March and then dissolved. Following the dissolution of this parliament, Charles exercised eleven years of Personal Rule without parliament until April 1640 when the Short Parliament was convened.

== List of constituencies and members ==
In 1628 the constituencies of Milborne Port and Weobley were re-enfranchised after the Committee of Privileges investigated abuses where the right of boroughs to return burgesses had fallen into disuse.

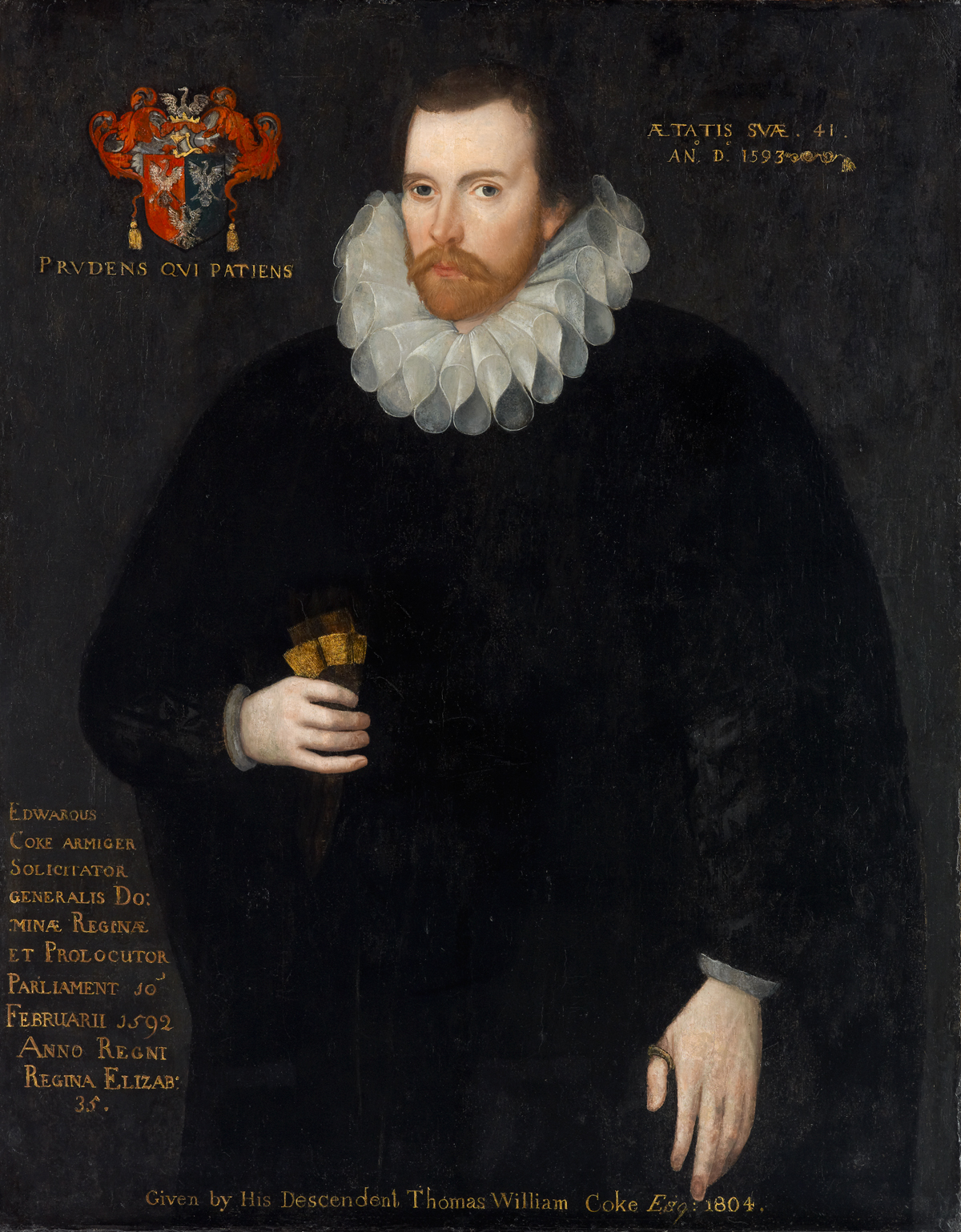
Edward Coke (Buckinghamshire)

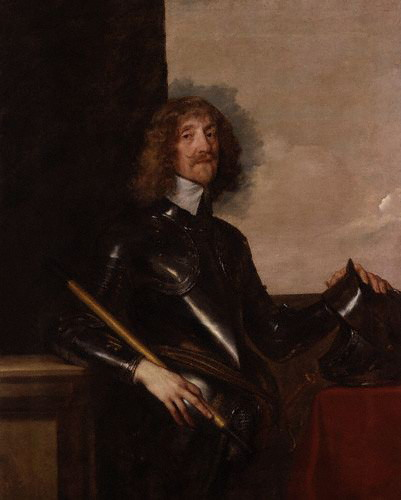
Sir Edmund Verney (Aylesbury)

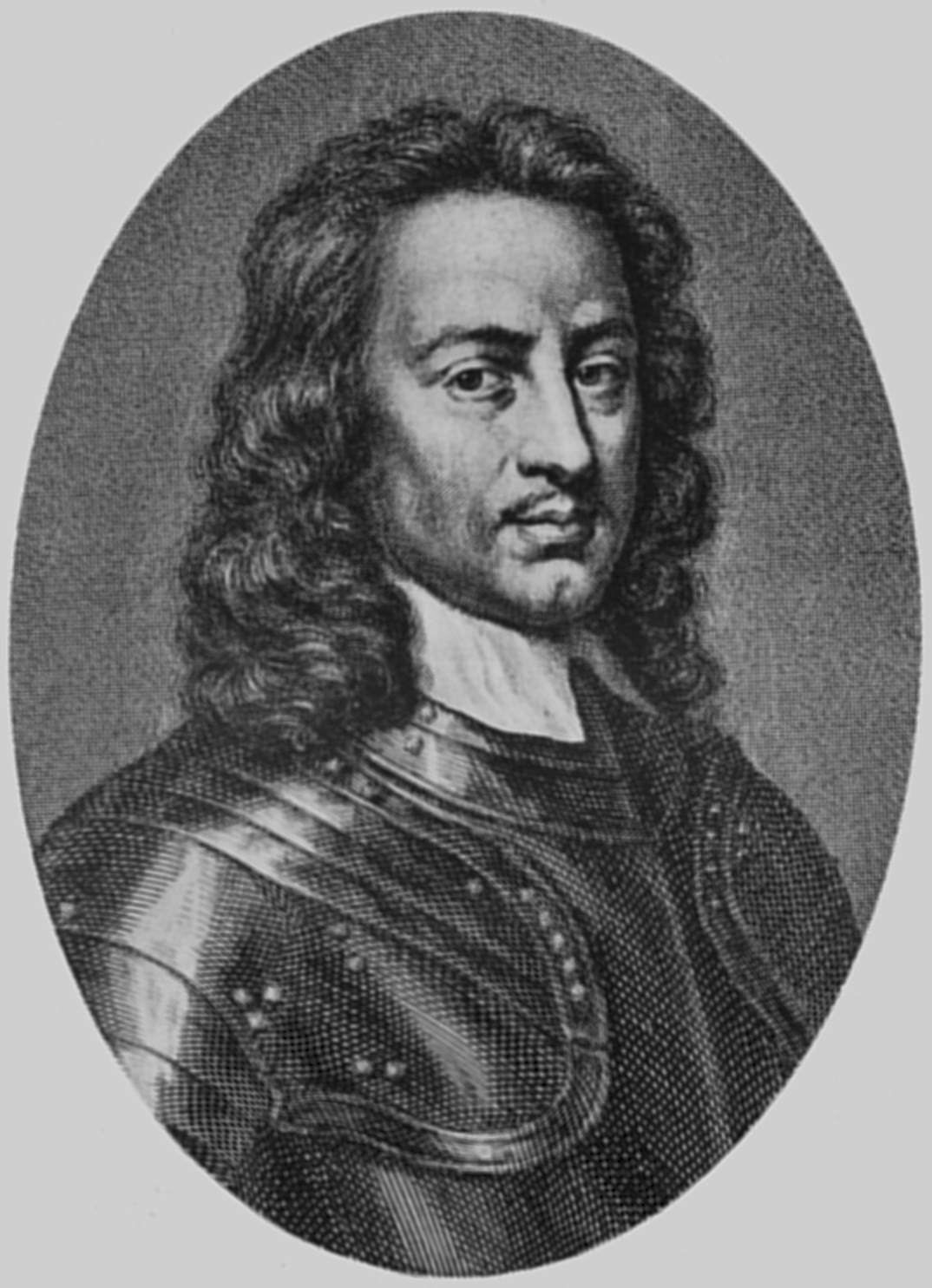
John Hampden (Wendover)

Sir William Brereton (Cheshire)

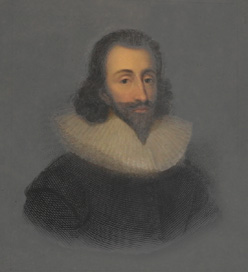
Sir John Eliot (Cornwall)

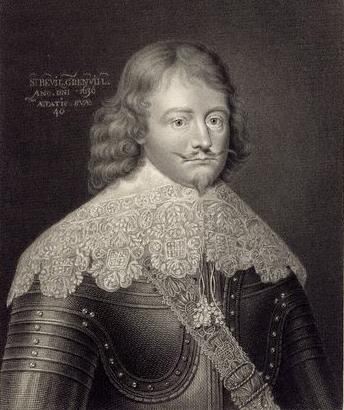
Sir Bevil Grenville (Launceston)

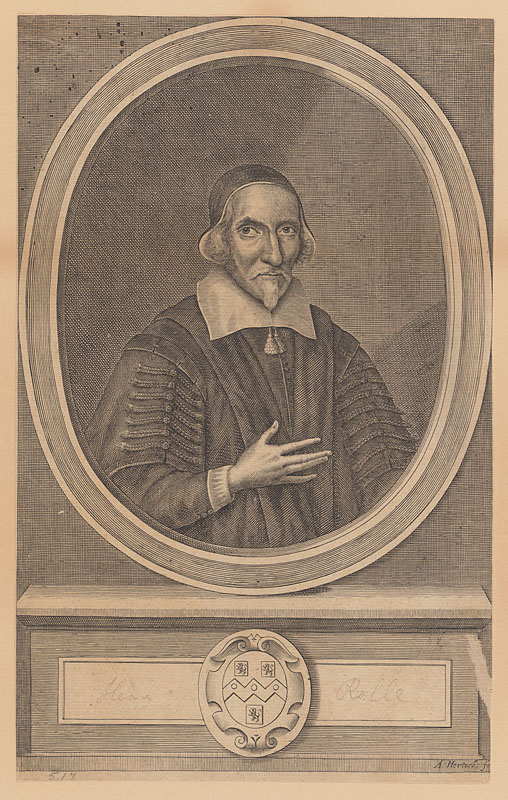
Henry Rolle (Truro)

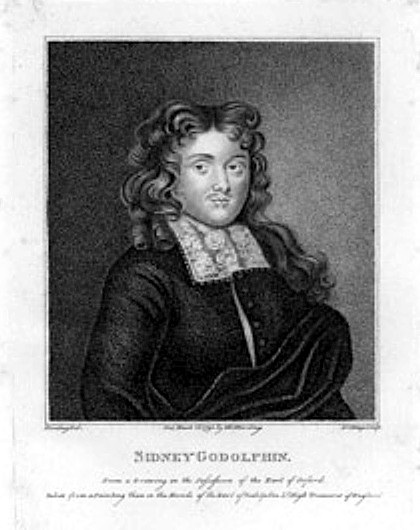
Sidney Godolphin (Helston)

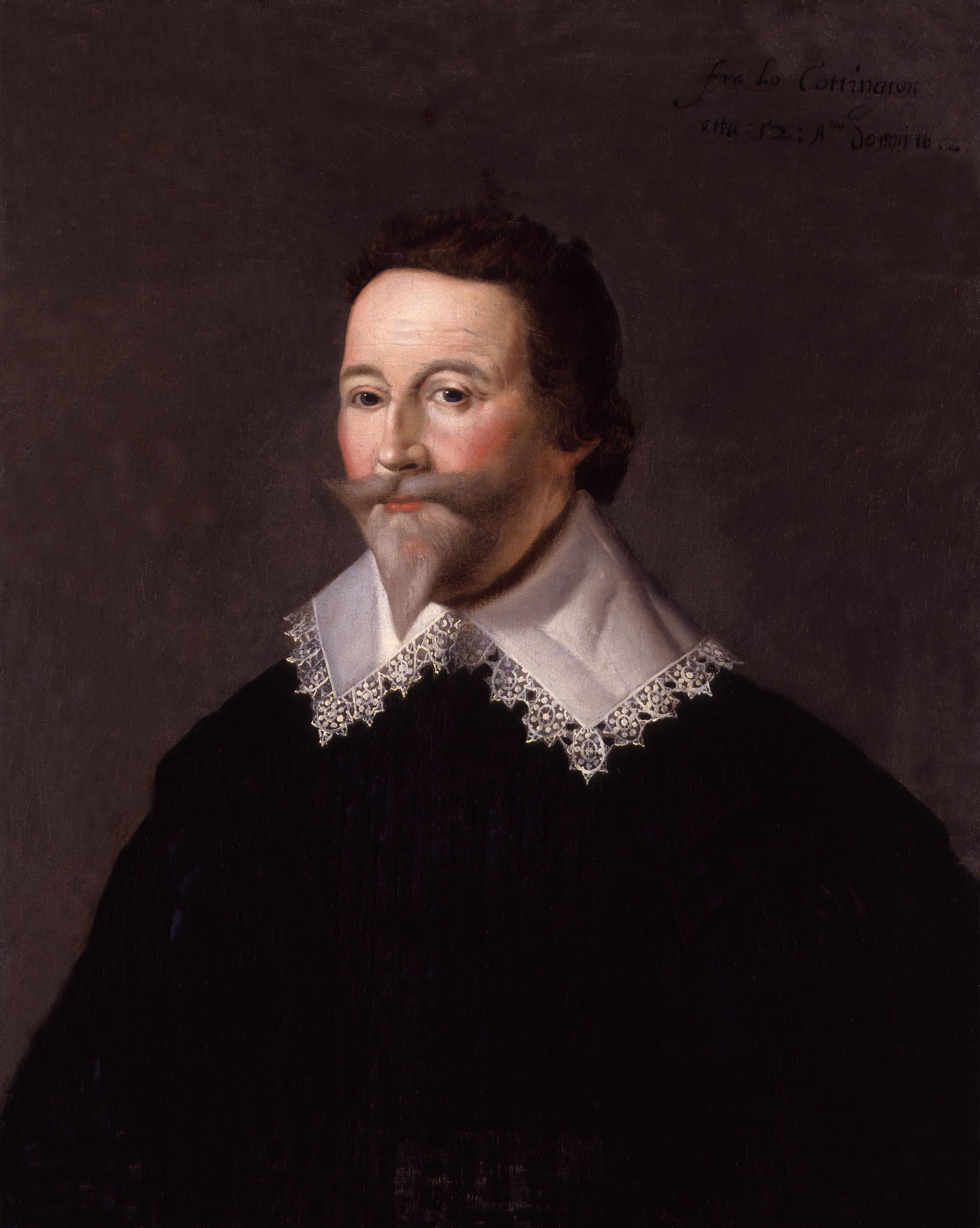
Sir Francis Cottington (Saltash)

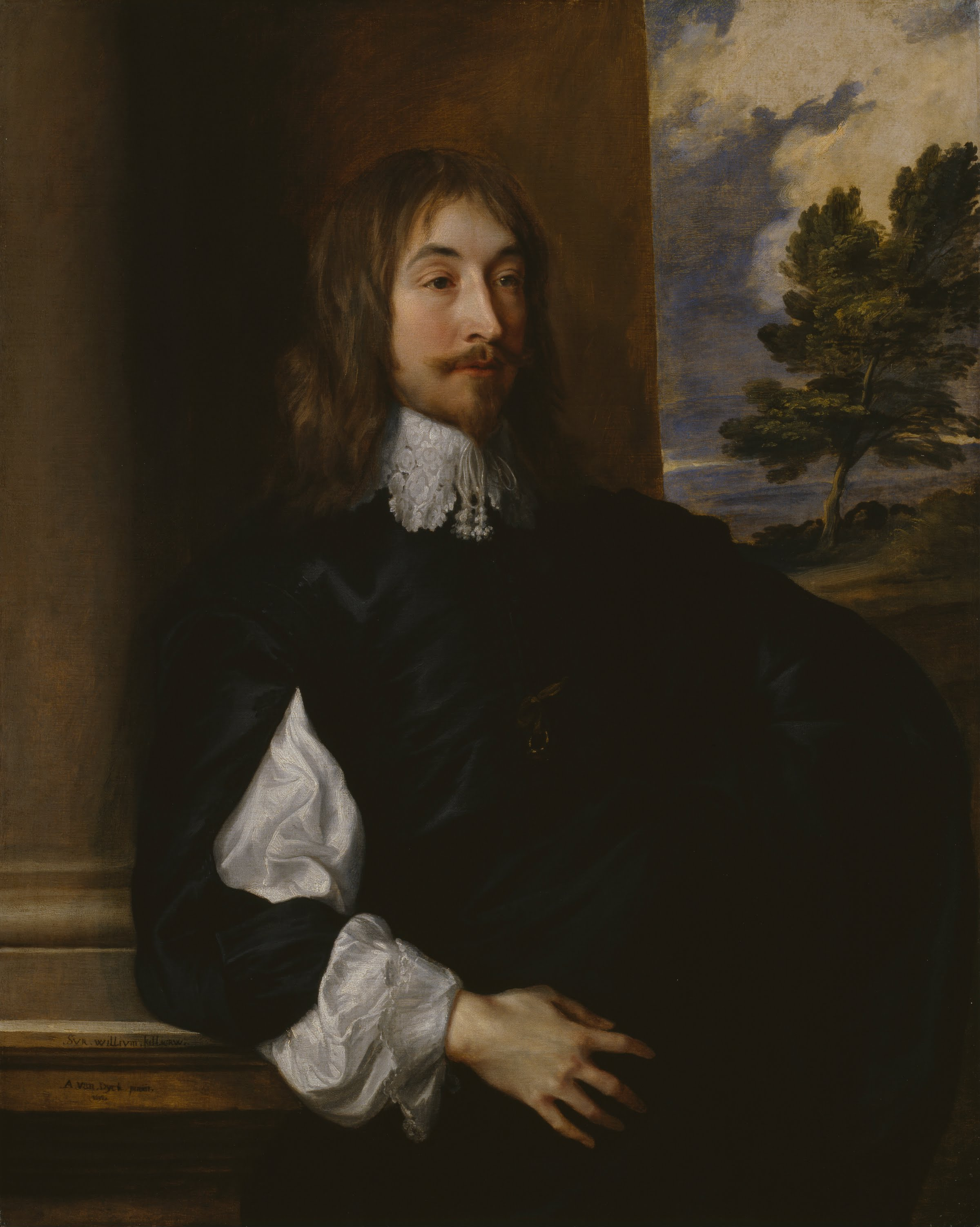
Sir William Killigrew (Penryn)

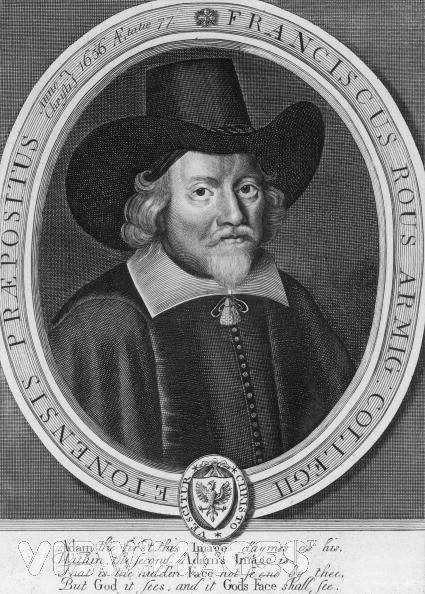
Francis Rous (Tregoney)

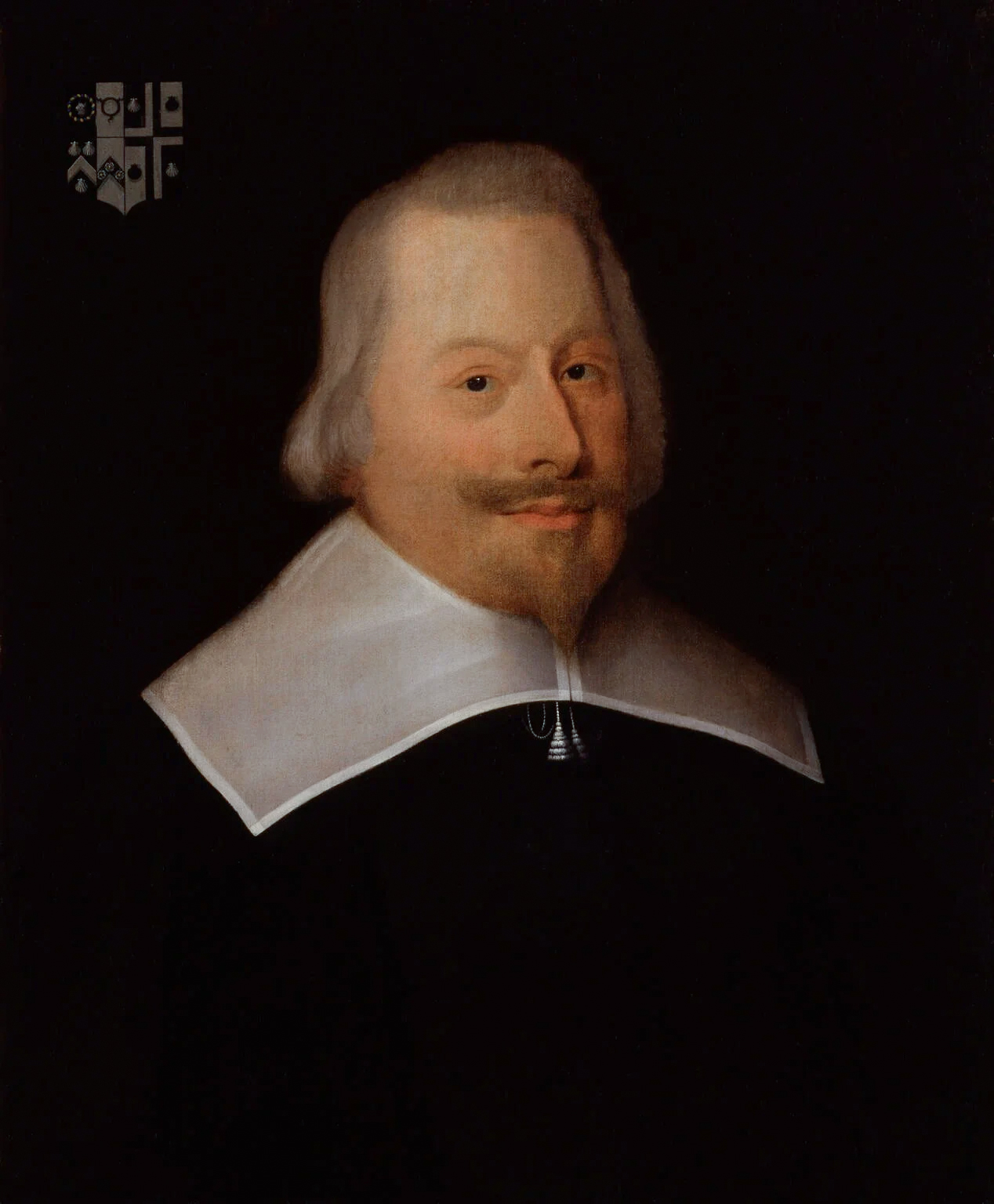
John Pym (Tavistock)

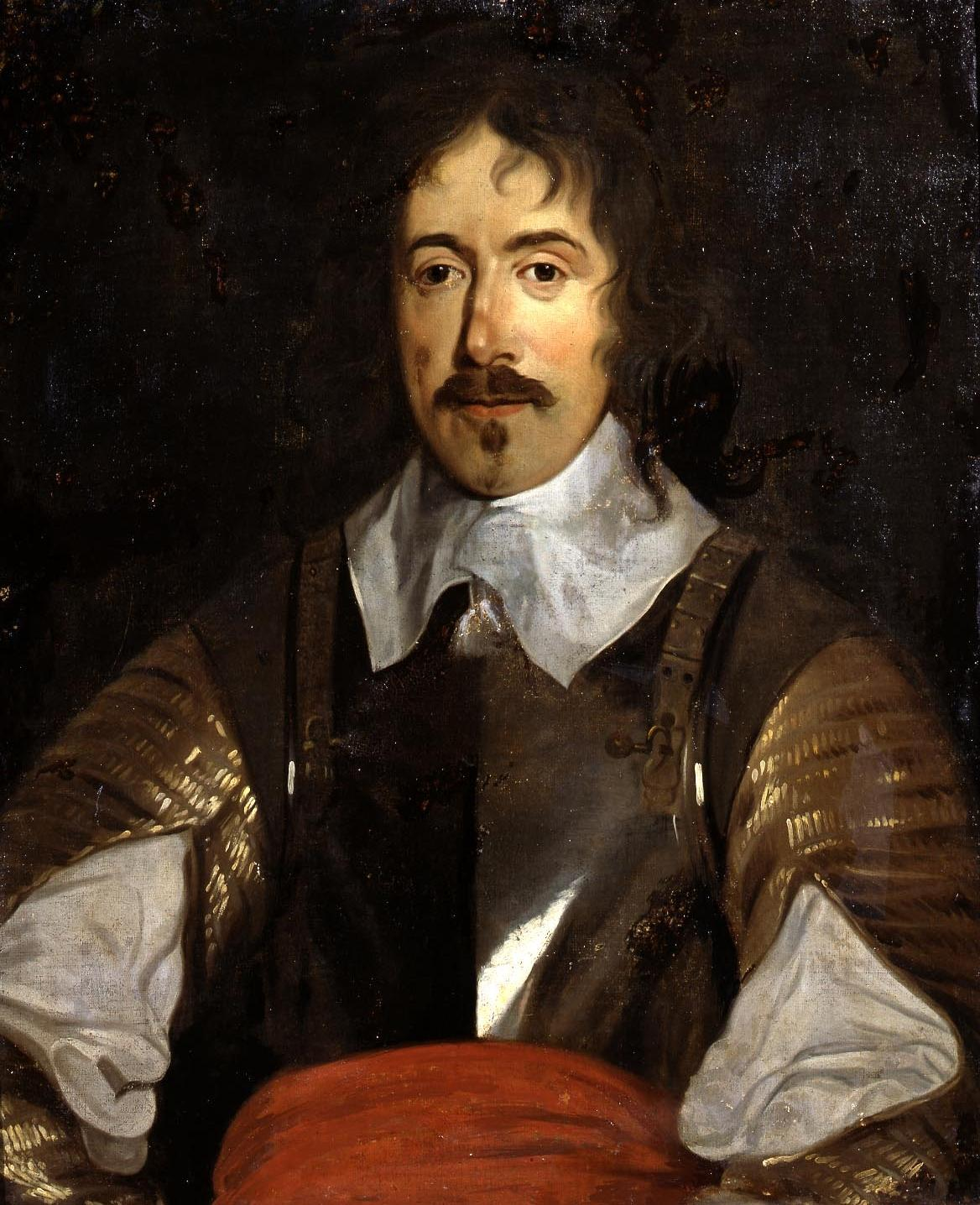
Denzil Holles (Dorchester)

Oliver Cromwell (Huntingdon)

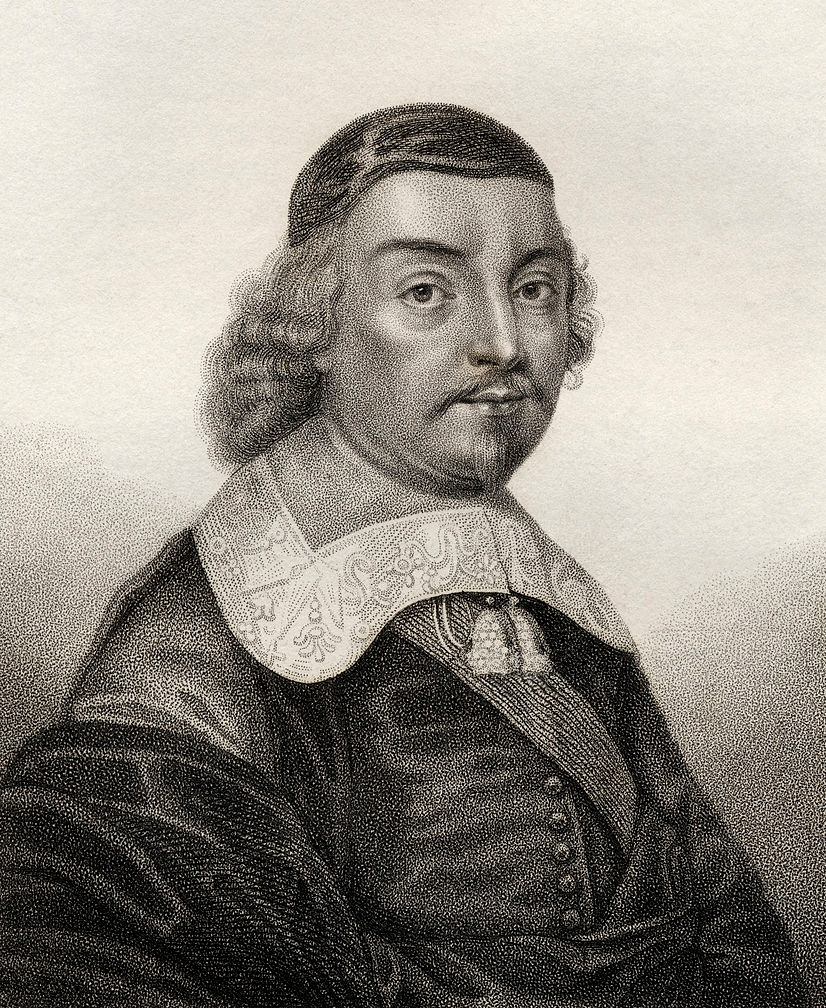
Mildmay Fane (Peterborough)

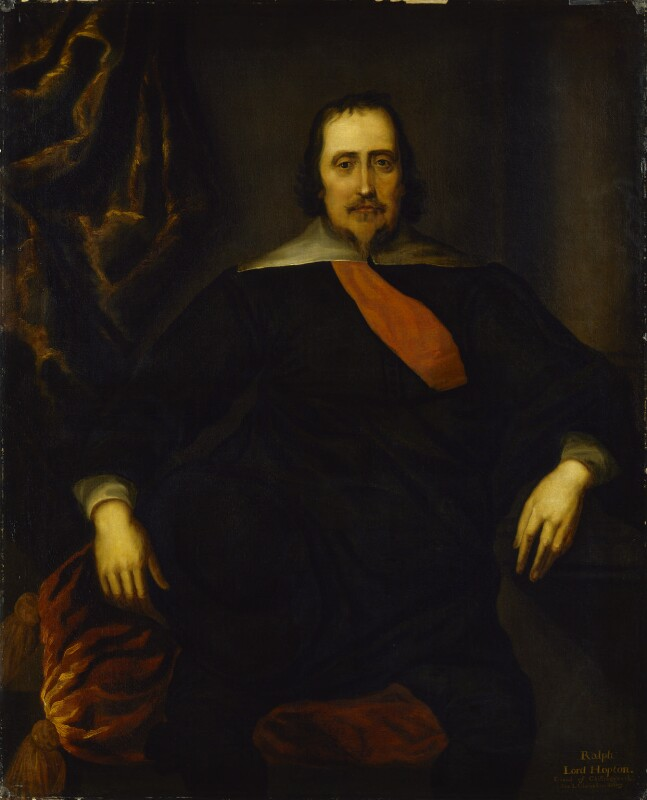
Ralph Hopton (Wells)

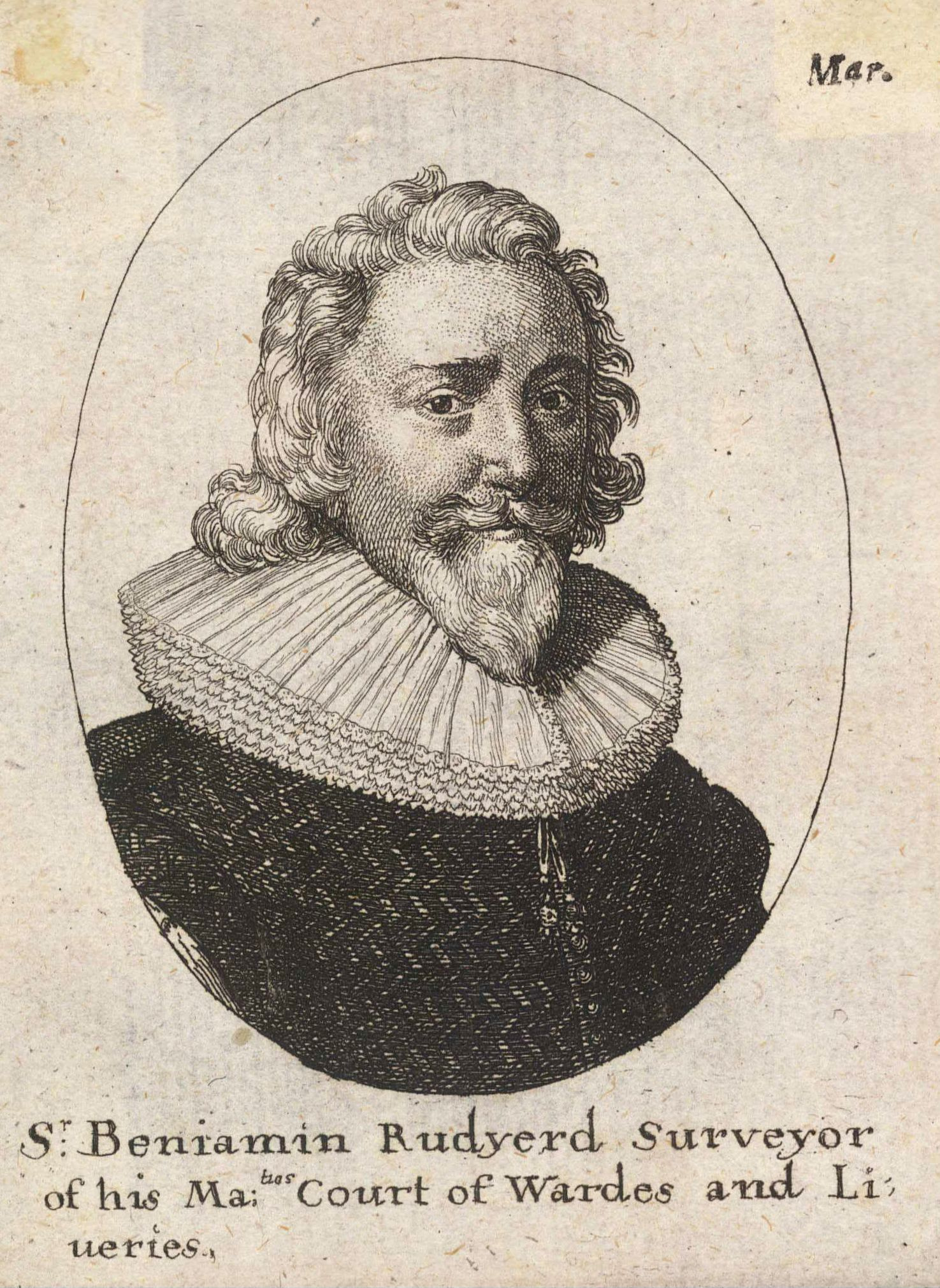
Benjamin Rudyerd (Downton)

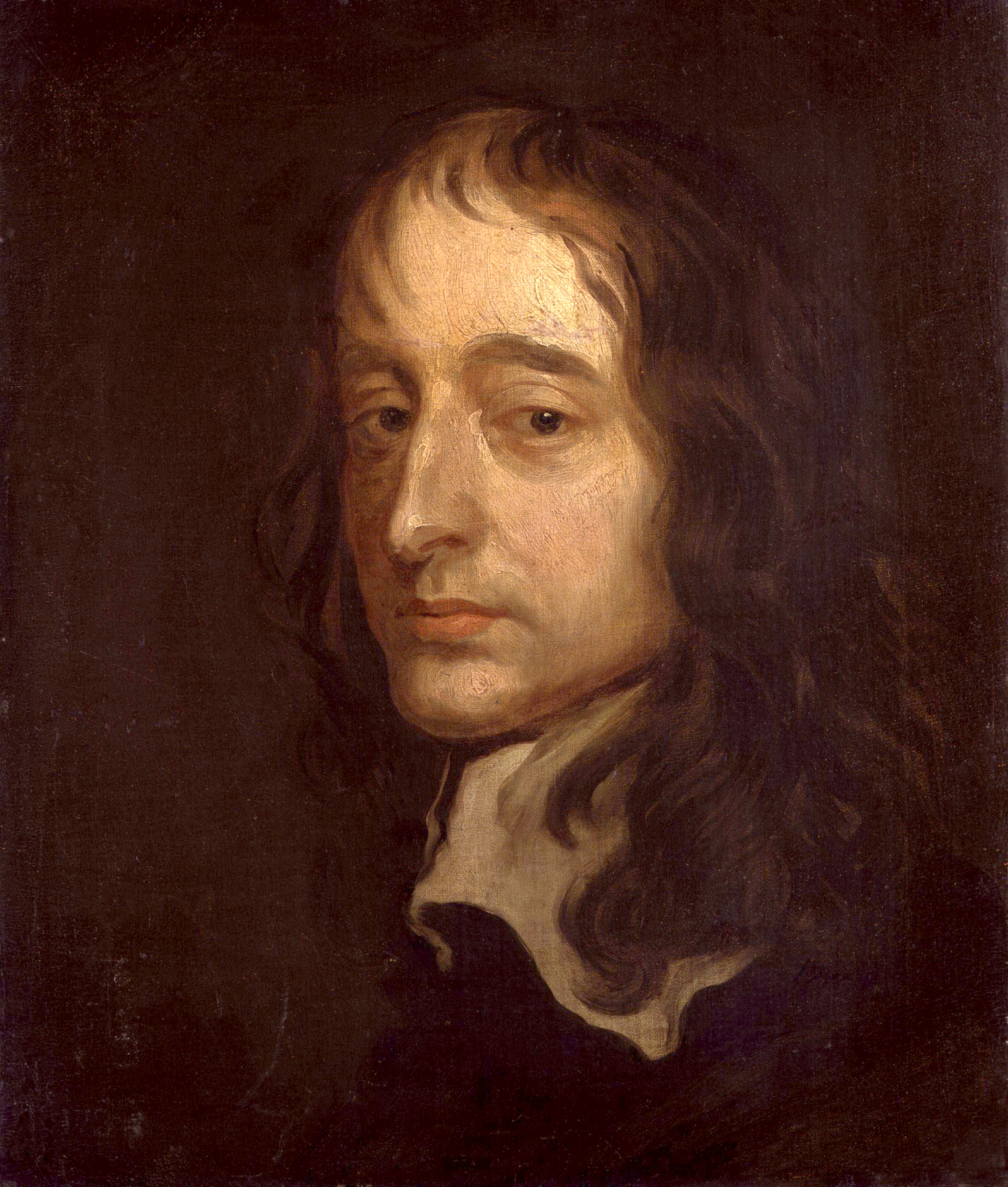
John Selden (Ludgershall)

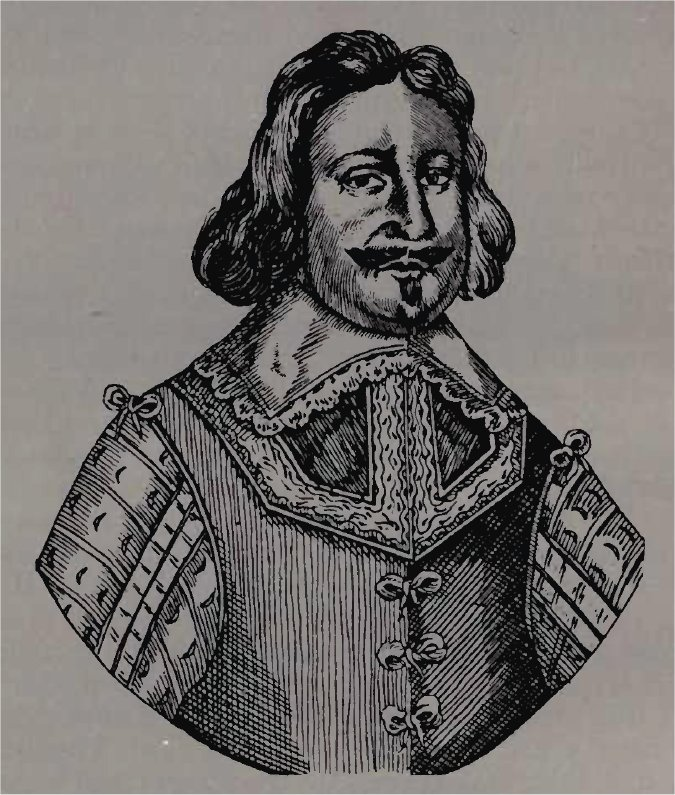
Ferdinando Fairfax, Lord Fairfax (Boroughbridge)

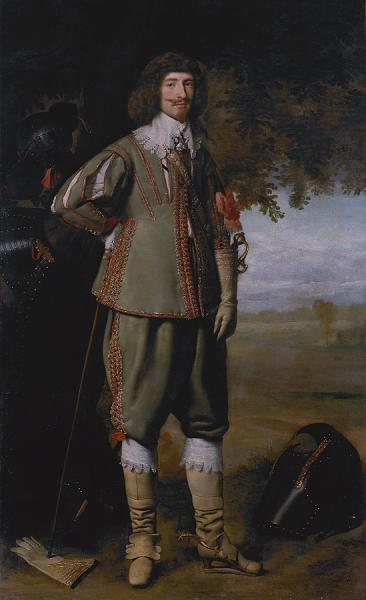
John Ashburnham (Hastings)

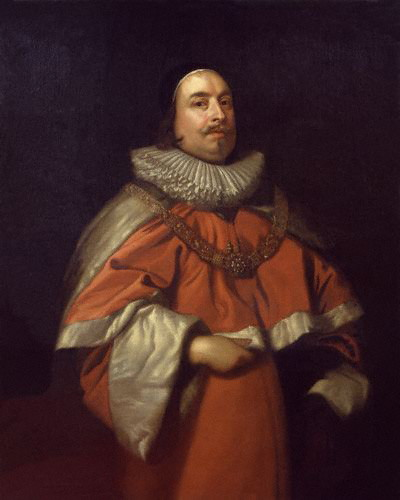
Sir Edward Littleton, 1st Baronet (Carnarvon)

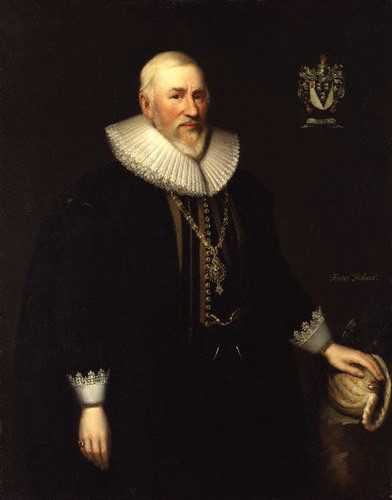
Sir Hugh Myddleton (Denbigh)

=== Bedfordshire ===
Constituency	Members	Notes
Bedfordshire	Oliver St John; Sir Oliver Luke	
Bedford	Sir Beauchamp St John; Richard Taylor	
=== Berkshire ===
Constituency	Members	Notes
Berkshire	John Fettiplace; Sir Richard Harrison	
Windsor	William Beecher; Thomas Hewett	
Reading	Sir Francis Knollys jun. John Saunders	
Wallingford	Edmund Dunch; Sir Robert Knollys	
Abingdon	Sir John Stonhouse 2nd Baronet	
=== Buckinghamshire ===
Constituency	Members	Notes
Buckinghamshire	Sir Edward Coke; Sir William Fleetwood	
Buckingham	Sir Thomas Denton; Richard Oliver	
Wycombe	Sir William Borlase; Thomas Lane	
Aylesbury	Sir Edmund Verney; Clement Coke	
Amersham	William Hakewill; Edmund Waller	
Wendover	John Hampden; Ralph Hawtree	
Marlow	Sir John Backhouse; Miles Hobart	
=== Cambridgeshire ===
Constituency	Members	Notes
Cambridgeshire	Sir Miles Sandys, 1st Baronet; Sir John Carleton, 1st Baronet	
Cambridge University	Thomas Eden; Sir John Coke	
Cambridge	Thomas Purchase; Thomas Meautys	
=== Cheshire ===
Constituency	Members	Notes
Cheshire	Sir William Brereton, Bt; Richard Grosvenor	
City of Chester	John Ratcliffe; Edward Whitby	
=== Cornwall ===
Constituency	Members	Notes
Cornwall	Sir John Eliot; William Coryton	
Launceston	Bevil Grenville; Richard Scott	
Liskeard	John Harris; Sir Francis Steward	
Lostwithiel	Sir Thomas Barger; John Chudleigh	
Truro	Richard Daniel; Henry Rolle	
Bodmin	Sir Robert Killigrew; Humphrey Nicholls	
Helston	William Noy; Sidney Godolphin	
Saltash	Sir Richard Buller; Sir Francis Cottington	
Camelford	Francis Crossing; Evan Edwards	
Grampound	Lord Carey; Sir Robert Pye	
Eastlow	William Murray; Paul Specot	
Westlow	John Parker; Edward Thomas	
Penryn	William Killigrew; Sir Thomas Edmondes	
Tregoney	Francis Rous; John Arundell	
Bossiney	Richard Edgcumbe; Lord Lambart	
St Ives	Francis Godolphin; John Payne	
Fowey	Robert Rashleigh; Sir Richard Grenville	
St Germans	Thomas Cotton; Benjamin Valentine	
Mitchel	Francis Buller; John Sparke	
Newport	Piers Edgcumbe; William Killigrew	Killigrew chosen for Penryn - replaced by Nicholas Trefusis
St Mawes	Thomas Carey; Hannibal Vyvyan	
Callington	John Rolle; Sir William Constable	
=== Cumberland ===
Constituency	Members	Notes
Cumberland	Sir George Dalston; Sir Patricius Curwen	
Carlisle	Richard Graham; Richard Barwis	
=== Derbyshire ===
Constituency	Members	Notes
Derbyshire	Sir Edward Leech; John Frescheville	
Derby	Philip Mainwaring; Timothy Leeving	
=== Devon ===
Constituency	Members	Notes
Devon	John Bampfield; Sir Francis Drake, Bt	
Exeter	Ignatius Jordan; John Lynn	
Totnes	Sir Edward Giles; Thomas Prestwood	
Plymouth	Thomas Sherville; John Glanville	
Barnstaple	Sir Alexander St John; John Delbridge	
Plympton Erle	Thomas Hele Bt; Sir James Bragge	
Tavistock	Sir Francis Glanville; John Pym	
Clifton Dartmouth Hardness	John Upton; Roger Matthew (Merchant)	
Bere Alston	Thomas Wise; William Strode	
Tiverton	Peter Ball; John Bluett	
=== Dorset ===
Constituency	Members	Notes
Dorset	Sir George Hussey; Sir John Strangways	
Poole	John Pyne; Sir John Cooper, Bt	
Dorchester	Denzil Holles; John Hill	
Lyme Regis	Christopher Erle; Thomas Paramour	
Weymouth and Melcombe Regis	Hugh Pyne; Lewis Dyve; Henry Waltham; Thomas Gyard	
Bridport	Thomas Pawlet; Bampfield Chafin	
Shaftesbury	John Thoroughgood; Sir John Croke	
Wareham	Gerrard Napier; Sir John Meller	
Corfe Castle	Sir Francis Nethersale; Giles Green	
=== Essex ===
Constituency	Members	Notes
Essex	Sir Francis Barrington Bt; Harbottle Grimston (senior).	
Colchester	Sir Thomas Cheek; Edward Alford	Alford replaced on petition by Sir William Masham, 1st Baronet
Maldon	Sir Henry Mildmay; Sir Arthur Harris	
Harwich	Nathaniel Rich; Christopher Harris	
=== Gloucestershire ===
Constituency	Members	Notes
Gloucestershire	Robert Poyntz; Nathaniel Stephens	
Gloucester	John Hanbury; John Browne	
Cirencester	Sir Giles Estcourt, 1st Baronet; John George	
Tewkesbury	Sir Baptist Hicks; Thomas Colepeper	
=== Hampshire ===
Constituency	Members	Notes
Hampshire	Sir Henry Wallop; Sir Daniel Norton	
Winchester	Richard Tichborne; Robert Mason	
Southampton	John Major; George Gallop	
Portsmouth	Owen Jennens; William Towerson	
Petersfield	Benjamin Tichborne; William Uvedale	
Yarmouth, Isle of Wight	Edward Dennis; John Oglander	
Newport, Isle of Wight	Christopher Yelverton; Philip Fleming	
Newtown, Isle of Wight	Sir Thomas Barrington, 2nd Baronet; Robert Barrington	
Stockbridge	Sir Richard Gifford; Sir Henry Whitehead	
Lymington	Herbert Doddington; Richard Whitehead	
Christchurch	Nathaniel Tomkins; Henry Croke	
Whitchurch	Sir Thomas Jervoise; John Jephson	
Andover	Robert Wallop; Ralph Conway	
=== Herefordshire ===
Constituency	Members	Notes
Herefordshire	Sir Giles Brydges, 1st Baronet; Sir Walter Pye	
Hereford	Sir John Scudamore; John Hoskins	
Leominster	James Tomkins; Edward Littleton	Littleton chosen for Carnarvon - replaced by Thomas Lyttelton
Weobley	William Walter; William Tomkins	
=== Hertfordshire ===
Constituency	Members	Notes
Hertfordshire	Sir William Lytton; Sir Thomas Dacres	
St Albans	Sir John Jennings; Robert Kirkham	
Hertford	Sir Edward Howard; Sir Thomas Fanshawe	Howard created Baron Howard of Escrick - replaced by Sir Charles Morrison, 1st Baronet
=== Huntingdonshire ===
Constituency	Members	Notes
Huntingdonshire	Sir Robert Payne; Sir Capell Bedell, 1st Baronet	
Huntingdon	Oliver Cromwell; James Montagu	
=== Kent ===
Constituency	Members	Notes
Kent	Thomas Finch; Sir Dudley Diggs	
Canterbury	Sir John Finch; Thomas Scott	Finch - Speaker
Rochester	Sir Thomas Walsingham; William Brooke	
Maidstone	Sir George Fane; Francis Barnham	
Queenborough	Roger Palmer; Sir John Hales	
=== Lancashire ===
Constituency	Members	Notes
Lancashire	Sir Richard Molyneux; Sir Alexander Radcliffe	
Preston	Robert Carr; George Gerard	
Lancaster	Francis Bindlosse; Sir Thomas Fanshawe	
Newton	Sir Henry Holcroft; Sir Francis Onslow	
Wigan	Edward Bridgeman; Sir Anthony St John	
Clitheroe	Thomas Jermyn; William Newell	
Liverpool	Henry Jermyn; John Newdigate	
=== Leicestershire ===
Constituency	Members	Notes
Leicestershire	Sir Edward Hartopp; Ferdinando, Lord Hastings	
Leicester	Sir Humphrey May; Sir John Stanhope	
=== Lincolnshire ===
Constituency	Members	Notes
Lincolnshire	Sir John Wray; Sir William Airmine	
Lincoln	Sir Thomas Grantham; Sir Edward Ayscough	
Boston	Richard Bellingham; Richard Chelley	
Grimsby	Christopher Wray; Henry Pelham	
Stamford	Thomas Hatton; Sir Edward Bashe	
Grantham	Thomas Hatcher; Alexander Moor	
=== Middlesex ===
Constituency	Members	Notes
Middlesex	Sir Francis Darcy; Sir Henry Spiller	
Westminster	Joseph Bradshaw; Thomas Morris	
City of London	Thomas Moulson; Christopher Clitherow; Henry Waller; James Bunce	
=== Monmouthshire ===
Constituency	Members	Notes
Monmouthshire	Nicholas Kemeys; Nicholas Arnold	
Monmouth Boroughs	William Morgan	
=== Norfolk ===
Constituency	Members	Notes
Norfolk	Sir Roger Townshend, Bt; John Heveningham	
Norwich	Sir Peter Gleane; Robert Debenham	
King's Lynn	William Doughty; Sir John Hare	
Yarmouth	Sir John Corbet; Sir John Wentworth	
Thetford	Edmund Moundeford; Henry Spiller	Spiller sat for Westminster - replaced by Sir Henry Vane
Castle Rising	Sir Robert Cotton; Thomas Bancroft	
=== Northamptonshire ===
Constituency	Members	Notes
Northamptonshire	Richard Knightley; Francis Nicolls	
Peterborough	Mildmay Lord D'Espencer; Laurence Whitacre	
Northampton	Richard Spencer; Christopher Sherland	
Brackley	Sir Thomas Wenman; John Curzon	
Higham Ferrers	Sir George Sondes	
=== Northumberland ===
Constituency	Members	Notes
Northumberland	Sir John Fenwick; Sir William Carnaby	
Newcastle	Sir Peter Riddel; Sir Thomas Ridell	
Morpeth	Sir Thomas Reynell; Sir John Bankes	
Berwick upon Tweed	Sir Edmund Sawyer; Edward Liveley	
=== Nottinghamshire ===
Constituency	Members	Notes
Nottinghamshire	Sir Gervase Clifton; Sir John Byron	
Nottingham	Sir Charles Cavendish; Henry Pierrepont	
East Retford	Sir Edward Osborne; Henry Stanhope, Lord Stanhope	
=== Oxfordshire ===
Constituency	Members	Notes
Oxfordshire	Hon. James Fiennes; Sir Francis Wenman	
Oxford University	Sir Henry Marten; John Danvers	
Oxford	John Whistler; Thomas Wentworth	
Woodstock	Edward Tavernor; Sir Miles Fleetwood	
Banbury	John Crew	
=== Rutland ===
Constituency	Members	Notes
Rutland	William Bulstrode; Sir Guy Palmes	
=== Salop ===
Constituency	Members	Notes
Shropshire	Sir Richard Newport; Sir Andrew Corbet	
Shrewsbury	Sir William Owen; Thomas Owen	
Bridgnorth	Sir Richard Shelton; Sir George Paule	
Ludlow	Richard Tomlins; Ralph Goodwin	
Wenlock	Thomas Lawley; George Bridgmant	
Bishops Castle	Robert Howard; Sir Edward Fox	
=== Somerset ===
Constituency	Members	Notes
Somerset	Sir Robert Phelips; Sir Edward Rodney	
Bristol	John Doughty; John Barker	
Bath	John Popham; Walter Long	
Wells	Sir Ralph Hopton; John Baber	
Taunton	Sir Hugh Portman; George Browne	
Bridgwater	Sir Thomas Wroth; Thomas Smith	
Minehead	Thomas Horner; Edward Wyndham	
Ilchester	Sir Henry Berkeley; Robert Gorges	
Milborne Port	Philip Digby; Sir Nathaniel Napier	
=== Staffordshire ===
Constituency	Members	Notes
Staffordshire	Sir Hervey Bagot; Thomas Crompton	
Lichfield	Sir William Walter; Sir Richard Dyott	
Stafford	Matthew Cradock; William Wingfield	
Newcastle under Lyme	Sir George Gresley; Rowland Cotton	
Tamworth	Sir Thomas Puckering; Sir Walter Devereux	
=== Suffolk ===
Constituency	Members	Notes
Suffolk	Sir Nathaniel Barnardiston; Sir William Spring	
Ipswich	William Cage; Edmund Day	
Dunwich	Sir Robert Brooke; Francis Winterton	
Orford	Sir Charles Legross; Sir Lionel Tollemache	
Eye	Francis Finch; Sir Roger North	
Aldeburgh	Sir Simon Steward; Marmaduke Rawden	
Sudbury	Sir Robert Crane, 1st Baronet; Sir William Pooley	
Bury St Edmunds	Sir Thomas Jermyn; Sir William Hervey	
=== Surrey ===
Constituency	Members	Notes
Surrey	Sir Richard Onslow; Sir Ambrose Browne	
Southwark	Richard Yarward; William Coxe	
Bletchingly	Edward Bishopp; John Evelyn	
Reigate	Charles Cockayne; Sir Thomas Bludder	
Guildford	Robert Parkhurst; Poynings More	
Gatton	Sir Samuel Owfield; Sir Charles Howard	
Haslemere	George Grimes; Sir Thomas Canon	
=== Sussex ===
Constituency	Members	Notes
Sussex	Sir William Goring, 1st Baronet; Richard Lewknor	
Chichester	William Cawley; Sir Henry Bellingham	
Horsham	Dudley North; John Middleton	
Midhurst	Christopher Lewknor; Edward Savage	
Lewes	Sir Anthony Stapeley; Sir George Goring	
New Shoreham	Robert Morley; William Marlott	
Bramber	Sir Sackville Crowe; Sir Thomas Bowyer	
Steyning	Edward Alford; Sir Thomas Farnefold	
East Grinstead	Sir Henry Compton; Robert Goodwin	
Arundel	John Alford; Henry Lord Maltravers	
=== Warwickshire ===
Constituency	Members	Notes
Warwickshire	Sir Thomas Lucy; Sir Thomas Leigh	
Coventry	William Purefoy; Richard Green	
Warwick	Francis Lucy; Hon. Robert Greville	Election declared void – Greville replaced by Anthony Stoughton
=== Westmorland ===
Constituency	Members	Notes
Westmoreland	Sir John Lowther; John Lowther	
Appleby	William Ashton; Richard Lowther	
=== Wiltshire ===
Constituency	Members	Notes
Wiltshire	Sir William Button; Sir Francis Seymour	
Salisbury	Henry Sherfield; Bartholemew Tookey	
Wilton	John Pooley; Sir Thomas Morgan	
Downton	Sir Benjamin Rudyerd; Edward Herbert	
Hindon	Sir Thomas Thynne; Lawrence Hyde	
Heytesbury	Sir Charles Berkeley; William Rolfe	
Westbury	Maximilian Petty; Charles Thynne	
Calne	Sir John Maynard; George Lowe	
Devizes	Robert Long; Thomas Kent	
Chippenham	Sir Francis Popham; Sir John Eyres	
Malmesbury	Sir William Crofts; Sir Henry Moody	
Cricklade	Robert Jenner; Sir Edward Hungerford	
Great Bedwyn	Edward Kyrton; Sir John Trevor	
Ludgershall	John Selden; Sir Thomas Lay	
Old Sarum	Michael Oldisworth; Christopher Keightley	
Wootton Bassett	Sir John Francklyn; Anthony Rowse	
Marlborough	Richard Digges; Henry Percy	
=== Worcestershire ===
Constituency	Members	Notes
Worcestershire	Thomas Coventry; Sir Thomas Bromley	
Worcester	John Coucher; John Haselock	
Droitwich	John Wilde; George Wylde II	
Evesham	Sir Robert Harley; Richard Cresheld	
Bewdley	Ralph Clare	
=== Yorkshire ===
Constituency	Members	Notes
Yorkshire	Henry Belasyse; Sir Thomas Wentworth, Bt	
York	Sir Arthur Ingram; Sir Thomas Savile	Savile replaced after petition by Thomas Hoyle
Kingston upon Hull	John Lister; James Watkinson	
Knaresborough	Sir Richard Hutton; Henry Benson	
Scarborough	Sir William Constable; John Harrison	
Ripon	William Mallory; Sir Thomas Posthumous Hoby	
Richmond	Sir Talbot Bowes; James Howell	
Hedon	Sir Christopher Hilliard; Thomas Alured	
Boroughbridge	Ferdinando, Lord Fairfax; Francis Neville	
Thirsk	Christopher Wandesford; William Frankland	
Aldborough	Henry Darley; Robert Stapleton	
Beverley	Sir John Hotham Bt; Sir William Alford	
Pontefract	Sir John Ramsden; Sir John Jackson	
=== Cinque Ports ===
Constituency	Members	Notes
Hastings	John Ashburnham; Nicholas Eversfield	
Romney	Thomas Godfrey; Thomas Brett	
Hythe	Sir Peter Heyman; Sir Edward Scott	
Dover	John Hippisley; Edward Nicholas	
Sandwich	John Philipot; Peter Peake	
Rye	Richard Tufton; Thomas Fotherley	
Winchelsea	William Twysden; Sir Ralph Freeman	
=== Wales ===
Constituency	Members	Notes
Anglesey	Richard Bulkeley	
Beaumaris	Charles Jones	
Brecknockshire	Sir Henry Williams	
Brecknock	Walter Pye	
Cardiganshire	James Lewis	
Cardigan	John Vaughan	
Carmarthenshire	(Sir) Richard Vaughan	
Carmarthen	Henry Vaughan	
Carnarvonshire	John Griffith	
Carnarvon	Edward Littleton	
Denbighshire	Sir Eubule Thelwall	
Denbigh Boroughs	Hugh Myddleton	
Flintshire	Robert Jones	
Flint	William Ravenscroft	
Glamorgan	Sir Robert Mansell	
Cardiff	Lewis Morgan	
Merioneth	Richard Vaughan	
Montgomeryshire	William Herbert	
Montgomery	Sir Richard Lloyd	
Pembrokeshire	John Wogan	
Pembroke	Hugh Owen	
Haverford West	Sir James Perrot	
Radnorshire	Richard Jones	
Radnor	Charles Price	

== See also ==
- List of parliaments of the United Kingdom
