= Matthew Cradock (disambiguation) =

Matthew Cradock (died 1641) was a merchant and politician.

Matthew Cradock may also refer to:

- Matthew Cradock (died 1590s), MP for Stafford (UK Parliament constituency)
- Matthew Cradock (died 1636), MP for Stafford
