= William Jephson (died 1615) =

(c.1565–1615) of Froyle, Hants

Sir William Jephson (c. 1565 – 16 November 1615), of Froyle, Hampshire, was an English Member of Parliament.

Jephson was the eldest son of William Jephson of Froyle and Mary, daughter of Sir John Dannett of Bruntingthorpe, Leicestershire. His father was High Sheriff of Hampshire in 1571-2. His father passed Froyle to him in 1599, presumably on his marriage to Frances, daughter of John Garroway of Acton, Middlesex.

He was knighted at Belvoir Castle on 23 April 1603 and attended Roger Manners, 5th Earl of Rutland on his diplomatic mission to the new queen's brother Christian IV of Denmark. He was a Member (MP) of the Parliament of England for Hampshire in 1604, presumably through the patronage of Henry Wriothesley, 3rd Earl of Southampton. He was appointed to three committees during the first session of the parliament, but seems to have been largely inactive. This may have been due to ill health, as during the fourth session it was alleged by one of his constituents that he was blind.

He died childless in November 1615 and the estate passed to his brother Sir John Jephson.

Parliament of England
Preceded by Sir Henry Wallop; Edward More	Member of Parliament for Hampshire; 1604; With: Sir Robert Oxenbridge	Succeeded by Richard Tichborne; Sir William Uvedale
