= James Montagu (MP) =

English Member of Parliament (died 1666)

MP for Huntingdon
- In office 1628–1629 Serving with Oliver Cromwell

Personal details
- Born: 1603/1607
- Died: 1666 (aged 59 or 63)
- Parent(s): Henry Montagu, 1st Earl of Manchester; Catherine Spencer

James Montagu (1603 to 1608 – 1666) was an English politician who represented Huntingdon in the English House of Commons alongside Oliver Cromwell in 1628.

== See also ==
- List of MPs elected to the English parliament in 1628
