= Benjamin Tichborne =

English lawyer and politician

Benjamin Tichborne (circa 1598 – by September 1661) was an English lawyer and politician who sat in the House of Commons from 1626 to 1629.

Tichborne was the son of Sir Walter Tichborne, of Aldershot, Hampshire. He subscribed at Oxford University on 3 December 1613. He was of Frimley, Surrey, when called to the bar at Middle Temple in 1625. In 1626, he was elected Member of Parliament for Petersfield and for St Ives and chose to sit for Petersfield. In 1628 he was re-elected MP for Petersfield and sat until 1629 when King Charles decided to rule without parliament for eleven years.

Tichborne was known to be alive in 1658, but had died by September 1661.

Parliament of England
Preceded by William Uvedale; Sir John Jephson	Member of Parliament for Petersfield; 1626–1629; With: William Uvedale	Parliament suspended until 1640
