= Robert Oxenbridge (died 1638) =

Sir Robert Oxenbridge (1595–1638) was an English landowner and politician who sat in the House of Commons from 1621 to 1624.

Oxenbridge was the son of Sir Robert Oxenbridge of Hurstbourne Priors, Hampshire and his wife Elizabeth Cook, daughter of Sir Henry Coke of Broxbourne He entered Gray's Inn on October 26, 1614. In 1616 he succeeded to the estates at Hurstbourne on the death of his father and was knighted at Newmarket in November 1616.

In 1621, Oxenbridge was elected Member of Parliament for Whitchurch. He was elected MP for Hampshire in 1624 and for Whitchurch again in 1625 and 1626. In 1636 he sold the estate of Hurstbourne Priors for £1,74712s. 4d. to Sir Henry Wallop, of Farleigh Wallop.

Oxenbridge died unmarried at the age of about 42. His sister Ursula married Sir John Monson, 2nd Baronet.

Parliament of England
Preceded by Sir Edward Barrett; Sir Richard Pawlett	Member of Parliament for Whitchurch; 1621; With: Sir Thomas Jervoise	Succeeded by Sir Thomas Jervoise; Sir Henry Wallop
Preceded by Sir Henry Wallop; Sir John Jephson	Member of Parliament for Hampshire; 1624; With: Sir Daniel Norton	Succeeded by Robert Wallop; Henry Whitehead
