= Edward Clarke (MP for Hythe) =

Edward Clarke (referred to as Ned Clarke) (died 1628) was an English courtier, politician and diplomat employed by Charles I of England and George Villiers, 1st Duke of Buckingham.

== Life ==
Clarke was made clerk extraordinary of the Privy Council in 1620, successor to William Beecher, and was introduced at court by Buckingham. He was not a success with the king, however, because of a deformed hand. He became a courier.

In September 1623 he was entrusted by Charles with secret orders to Lord Bristol, then British ambassador at Madrid, for the postponement of the Spanish Match. He sat for Hythe in the short-lived parliament of 1625. For an attempted defence of Buckingham he was on 6 August 1625 imprisoned by the House of Commons at Oxford.

The next year Buckingham tried to persuade the small electorate of Bridport, Dorset to return Clarke to Parliament, as they had already done for Sir Richard Strode, another of Buckingham's nominees, but they refused on the grounds that they had promised the second seat for the constituency to Sir Lewis Dyve.

Shortly Clarke was spreading upbeat rumours that a French alliance was at hand. In 1627 he was sent on a mission to Christian IV of Denmark, then beset in the Thirty Years' War by Imperial forces.

In March 1628 he was acting as the king's agent at the Siege of La Rochelle and two months later accompanied the fleet to La Rochelle, though his private advice to Buckingham was that this expedition would fail. Whilst there he managed to offend Buckingham, and on his return was shunned at court. He did not long survive his assassinated patron.

== Notes ==
Attribution

This article incorporates text from a publication now in the public domain: Stephen, Leslie, ed. (1887). "Clarke, Edward (d.1630)". Dictionary of National Biography. Vol. 10. London: Smith, Elder & Co.
