= Robert Oxenbridge (died 1616) =

Sir Robert Oxenbridge (died 1616) was an English landowner and politician who sat in the House of Commons from 1604 to 1611.

Oxenbridge was the son of Robert Oxenbridge of Hurstbourne Priors, Hampshire. In 1591, he succeeded to the estates at Hurstbourne on the death of his father. He entered Lincoln's Inn in November 1592. He was knighted in August 1600. In 1604, Oxenbridge was elected Member of Parliament for Hampshire. He was active on committees on reform of the ministry, and although his brother was a Jesuit, he took an anti-Catholic line after the Gunpowder Plot. In February 1606 he accused Sir William Maurice of attending mass although it was noted that “the House took no hold of that speech”.

Oxenbridge married Elizabeth Cook, daughter of Sir Henry Coke of Broxbourne. Their son Robert succeeded to the estates and was an MP. Their daughter Ursula married Sir John Monson, 2nd Baronet.

Parliament of England
Preceded by Sir Henry Wallop; Sir Edward More	Member of Parliament for Hampshire; 1604–1611; With: William Jephson	Succeeded by Richard Tichborne; Sir William Uvedale
