= Sir Richard Tichborne, 2nd Baronet =

English politician

Sir Richard Tichborne, 2nd Baronet (1578 – April 1657) was an English politician who sat in the House of Commons from 1597. He was a Royalist commander in the English Civil War.

Tichborne was the oldest son of Sir Benjamin Tichborne, 1st Baronet of Tichborne and his second wife Amphillis Weston, daughter of Richard Weston, justice of the common pleas. The Tichbornes were one of the leading Roman Catholic families in the county, but like his father and brothers, Tichborne outwardly conformed to the Church of England. However, his career at Court was damaged when he was denounced in the House of Commons by Sir Daniel Norton on 27 April 1624 for the recusancy of his second wife and children. His situation was made more difficult by his inability to stay out of debt, mainly caused by his wish to be noticed at the Court of James I. His brother was Walter Tichborne of Aldershot.

Richard Tichborne was a student of the Middle Temple in 1595. In 1597 he was elected Member of Parliament for Lyme Regis. He was knighted at the Charter House on 11 May 1603. In 1604 he became joint keeper of Winchester Castle with his father. He was a ranger of West Beare forest by 1610. In 1614 he was elected MP for Hampshire. He was elected MP for Winchester in 1621 and was re-elected in 1624, 1625, 1626 and 1628. He was again presented for his wife's recusancy on 20 March 1626 but regardless the king appointed him Deputy Lieutenant for Hampshire by 1627. His wife's recusancy was complained of once more on 14 June 1628.

He succeeded to the family estates and the baronetcy on the death of his father on 11 September 1629. In the same year he built a sub-manor at Aldershot, which was later sold and which in 1808 became Aldershot Workhouse. He became a gentleman of the bedchamber to Charles I. In 1622 to 1623 he accompanied his cousin Sir Richard Weston on a diplomatic mission to Brussels, in the Spanish Netherlands, and may also have visited The Hague.

During the Civil War, Tichborne was a Royalist commander and held Winchester Castle for the King. His estates were sequestrated on 30 September 1650.

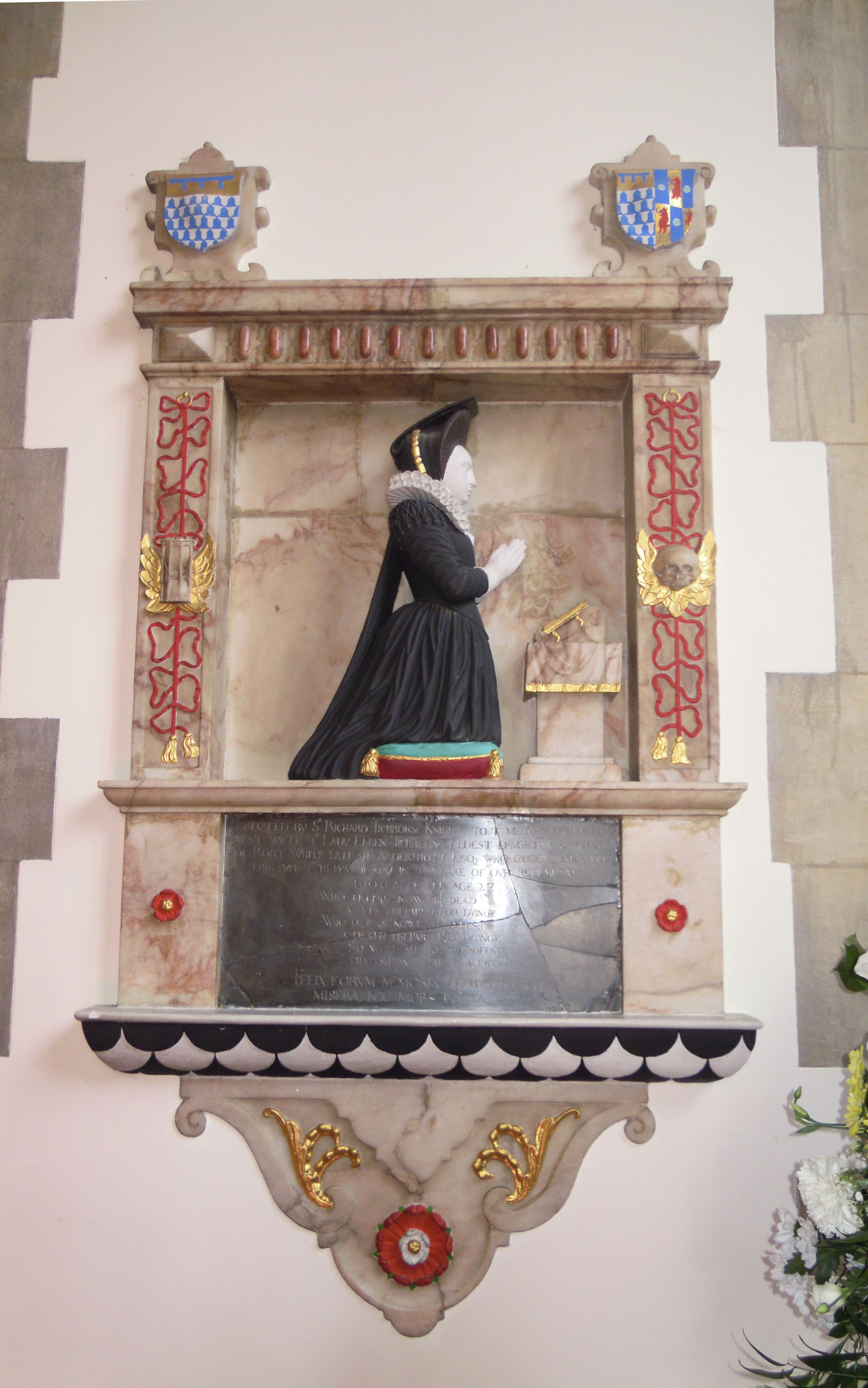
Memorial erected by Sir Richard Tichborne to his first wife, Ellen - St Michael's Church, Aldershot

Tichborne died at the age of 79.

Tichborne married firstly Ellen White, oldest daughter of Sir Robert White of Aldershot. She died on 18 May 1606, aged 27 and he married secondly on 7 July 1608, Susan Waller, daughter of William Waller of Oldstoke and Stoke Charity. They had three sons and three daughters.

His son Henry Tichborne succeeded to the baronetcy on his father's death in 1657 and also inherited his father's considerable debts - said by his father in 1650 to have been £15,000. Henry Tichborne set about restoring the family's fortunes, and by the time of the Restoration in 1660 he had restored his income to about £1,000 a year.

Parliament of England
Preceded by Robert Hassard; Zachariah Bethel	Member of Parliament for Lyme Regis; 1597; With: Christopher Ellesdon	Succeeded by John FitzJames; Nicholas Throckmorton
Preceded by Sir Robert Oxenbridge; William Jephson	Member of Parliament for Hampshire; 1614; With: Sir William Uvedale	Succeeded by Sir Henry Wallop; Sir John Jephson
Preceded by Sir William Sandys; Sir Thomas Bilson	Member of Parliament for Winchester; 1621–1629; With: William Savage 1621–1622; Lord Wriothesley 1624; Sir Thomas Phelipps 1625; Henry Whitehead 1626; Robert Mason 1628–1629	Parliament suspended until 1640
Baronetage of England
Preceded by Benjamin Tichborne	Baronet (of Tichborne); 1629–1657	Succeeded by Henry Tichborne
