= Robert Snelling =

Robert Snelling was one of the two MPs for Ipswich in a number of English parliaments between 1614 and 1626.

He was the only son of a merchant, Robert Snelling, of Whatfield and Ipswich and his wife Alice, the daughter of John Bacon, yeoman, of Great Blakenham. Alice had previously been married to Henry Cutting, yeoman, of Ringshall, Suffolk.

Parliament of England
Preceded by Sir Henry Glenham; Sir Francis Bacon	Member of Parliament for Ipswich; 1614–1629; With: Sir William Cage	Succeeded by Sir Edmund Day; Sir William Cage
