= Robert Kirkham =

Robert Kirkham (born c. 1579) was an English politician who sat in the House of Commons between 1628 and 1629.

Kirkham was of Middlesex. He matriculated at Christ Church, Oxford in February 1598, aged 18 and was awarded BA on 24 October 1601. He was a student of Lincoln's Inn in 1601. He was elected MP for St Albans in 1628 and sat until 1629 when King Charles decided to rule without parliament for eleven years.

Parliament of England
Preceded by Sir Charles Morrison, 1st Baronet; Sir Edward Goring	Member of Parliament for St Albans; 1628–1629; With: Sir John Jennings	Parliament suspended until 1640
