= Henry Whitehead (MP) =

English politician

Sir Henry Whitehead, sometimes written as Whithed (3 September 1574 – 27 April 1629) was an English politician who sat in the House of Commons from 1625 to 1629.

Whitehead was born on 3 September 1574, the only son of Richard Whitehead of Norman Court, and his wife Christian, daughter of William Jephson of Froyle, Hampshire. He matriculated at Hart Hall, Oxford in 1589. He inherited the estates of Norman Court and Shirley, Hampshire in 1593. He was knighted on 23 July 1603, and in 1609 he was High Sheriff of Hampshire.

In 1625, Whitehead was elected Member of Parliament for Hampshire. He was elected MP for Winchester in 1626 and for Stockbridge in 1628.

Whitehead was twice married. His first wife, by a settlement dated 20 March 1593, was Anne, daughter of James Weston, the chancellor of the Diocese of Lichfield. The couple had three sons and two daughters before Anne's death in 1623. Two sons and one daughter predeceased their father. Their surviving son, Richard, later became an MP and a colonel in the Parliamentary army. Henry married secondly, in a settlement dated 10 June 1604, Constance, the daughter of Sir Richard Norton of East Tisted, Hampshire. The couple had two sons and five daughters, one son predeceasing his father, before Constance's death on 23 October 1626. Sir Henry died on 27 April 1629 and was buried three days later at St Clement Danes.

Parliament of England
| Preceded by Sir Daniel Norton; Sir Robert Oxenbridge | Member of Parliament for Hampshire; 1625; With: Robert Wallop | Succeeded by Sir Henry Wallop; Robert Wallop |
| Preceded by Richard Tichborne; Sir Thomas Phelipps | Member of Parliament for Winchester; 1626; With: Richard Tichborne | Succeeded by Richard Tichborne; Robert Mason |
| Preceded by Sir Richard Gifford; Sir Thomas Badger | Member of Parliament for Stockbridge; 1628–1629; With: Sir Richard Gifford | Parliament suspended until 1640 |
