= Edward Bysshe (died 1655) =

English member of Parliament

Edward Bysshe (died 1655) was an English member of Parliament for Bletchingley elected in 1624, 1625, 1626, 1628, and April 1640. He was the father of Edward Bysshe (1615?–1679).
