= William Uvedale =

English politician (c. 1581–1652)

Personal details
- Born: c. 1581
- Died: 1652 (aged 70–71)

Sir William Uvedale (c. 1581 – 1652) was an English politician who sat in the House of Commons at various times between 1614 and 1645. He supported the Royalist cause in the Civil War.

== Career ==
Uvedale was the son of William Uvedale of Wickham and his wife Mary Norton, daughter of Sir Richard Norton. He matriculated at Queen's College, Oxford on 17 March 1598, aged 16. In 1600, he was a student of the Inner Temple. He was knighted on 19 November 1613.

In May 1605, he attended the Earl of Hertford's embassy to Brussels. In 1614 he was elected member of parliament for Hampshire. His father died in 1616 and he eventually inherited the estates on the death of his mother before 1626.

In January 1618, when John Bingley was knighted at Theobalds, he acted with other courtiers led by John Finet in an interlude featuring "Tom of Bedlam the Tinker" intended to amuse King James who was suffering from gout. The cast included: Thomas Dutton, Thomas Badger, George Goring, Thomas Tyringham, Edward Zouch, Robert Yaxley, Arthur Lake, and George Garret. The King was displeased by the play, especially the lyrics sung by Finet, and John Chamberlain was surprised that "none had the judgement to see how unfit it was to bring such beastly gear in public before a prince."

In 1621 he was elected MP for Newport (Isle of Wight). He was elected MP for Portsmouth in 1624. In 1625 he was elected MP for Petersfield. He was re-elected MP for Petersfield in 1626 and 1628, sitting until 1629 when King Charles decided to rule without parliament for eleven years.

In April 1640, Uvedale was again elected MP for Petersfield in the Short Parliament and was re-elected MP for Petersfield for the Long Parliament in November 1640.

He supported the Royalist cause and sat in the King's Oxford parliament. He was disabled from sitting in the Westminster before 1645. His property became much reduced in his lifetime, possibly because of his support of the royal cause.

== Death ==
Uvedale died at the age of about 70 and was buried on 3 December 1652.

== Marriage and family ==
Uvedale married firstly, around the year 1607, Anne Carey (d. 1627), a daughter of Sir Edmund Carey of Culham and his wife Mary Crocker. She had been a maid of honour to Anne of Denmark and walked in the queen's funeral procession in 1619, listed as "Lady Udall".

In 1640 he married secondly Victoria Cary, daughter of Henry Cary, 1st Viscount Falkland. Their children included:

- Elizabeth Uvedale, who married Edward Howard, 2nd Earl of Carlisle
- Frances Uvedale, who married Edward Griffin of Braybrooke and Dingley.

Parliament of England
Preceded by Sir Robert Oxenbridge; William Jephson	Member of Parliament for Hampshire; 1614; With: Richard Tichborne	Succeeded by Sir Henry Wallop; Sir John Jephson
Preceded by Sir Richard Worsley, 1st Baronet; John Searle	Member of Parliament for Newport (Isle of Wight); 1621–1622; With: Sir Richard Worsley, 1st Baronet 1621; Philip Fleming 1621–1622	Succeeded by John Danvers; Christopher Brooke
Preceded by Sir Daniel Norton; Sir Benjamin Rudyerd	Member of Parliament for Portsmouth; 1624; With: Sir Benjamin Rudyerd	Succeeded by Sir Daniel Norton; Sir Benjamin Rudyerd
Preceded by Sir John Jephson; Sir John Hippisley	Member of Parliament for Petersfield; 1625–1629; With: Sir John Jephson 1625; Benjamin Tichborne 1626–1629	Parliament suspended until 1640
Parliament suspended since 1629	Member of Parliament for Petersfield; 1640; With: Sir William Lewis, 1st Baronet	Succeeded by Sir William Lewis, 1st Baronet
