= Henry Wallop (died 1642) =

English politician

Sir Henry Wallop (18 October 1568 – 14 November 1642) of Farleigh House, Hampshire was an English politician who sat in the House of Commons variously between 1597 and 1642.

Wallop was the eldest son of Sir Henry Wallop of Farleigh Wallop in Hampshire, vice-treasurer of Ireland, and his wife Katherine, daughter of Richard Gifford. He was educated at St John's College, Oxford, graduating BA in 1588. He acted as his father's deputy at Dublin, and was knighted there in August 1599.

Wallop was elected Member of Parliament for Lymington in 1597 and knight of the shire for Hampshire for the last parliament of Queen Elizabeth I in 1601. He was High Sheriff of Hampshire in 1603 and again in 1629, and High Sheriff of Shropshire in between February and November 1606. He was elected MP for Stockbridge in 1614, (although the election was subsequently voided), and was one of the council for the marches of Wales in 1617. In 1621 he was re-elected for Hampshire and in 1623 he was elected MP for Whitchurch. In 1624 became Custos Rotulorum of Hampshire, a post he held until his death. He was elected MP for Andover in 1625 and in 1626 and 1628 was returned as MP for Hampshire.

Parliament was suspended for eleven years from 1629 and Wallop was obliged to serve a second term as High Sheriff of Hampshire the same year. In April 1640, he was again elected MP for Hampshire in the Short Parliament and in November 1640 for the Long Parliament. Wallop supported the Parliamentarian side but died at the age of 74 before he could take an active part in the Civil War.

He had married c.1596 Elizabeth Corbet, the daughter and heiress of Robert Corbet of Moreton Corbet, Shropshire, through whom he inherited Hopton Castle in Shropshire. Wallop left an only son, Robert Wallop who was also a Parliamentarian MP and had the Castle garrisoned for Parliament.

Parliament of England
Preceded by Richard Blount; John Knight	Member of Parliament for Lymington; 1597; With: Thomas West	Succeeded by Francis Darcy; Thomas Ridley
Preceded by Thomas Fleming; Richard Mill	Member of Parliament for Hampshire; 1601; With: Sir Edward More	Succeeded by Sir Robert Oxenbridge; William Jephson
Preceded by Sir William Fortescue; Sir Edwin Sandys	Member of Parliament for Stockbridge; 1614–1621; With: Sir Walter Cope	Succeeded by Sir William Ayloffe, Bt; Sir Richard Gifford
Preceded by Richard Tichborne; Sir William Uvedale	Member of Parliament for Hampshire; 1621–1622; With: Sir John Jephson	Succeeded by Sir Daniel Norton; Sir Robert Oxenbridge
Preceded by Sir Thomas Jervoise; Sir Robert Oxenbridge	Member of Parliament for Whitchurch; 1623–1625; With: Sir Thomas Jervoise	Succeeded by Robert Wallop; Sir Robert Oxenbridge
Preceded by Robert Wallop; John Shuter	Member of Parliament for Andover; 1625; With: Henry Shuter	Succeeded by Lord Henry Paulet; John Shuter
Preceded by Robert Wallop; Henry Whitehead	Member of Parliament for Hampshire; 1626–1629; With: Robert Wallop 1626; Sir Daniel Norton 1628–1629	Parliament suspended until 1640
Vacant Parliament suspended since 1629	Member of Parliament for Hampshire; 1640–1642; With: Richard Whitehead	Succeeded by Richard Whitehead; Richard Norton
