= Robert Wallop =

English politician (1601–1667)

Robert Wallop (20 July 1601 – 19 November 1667) was an English politician who sat in the House of Commons at various times from 1621 to 1660. He supported the Parliamentary cause in the English Civil War and was one of the regicides of King Charles I of England.

== Early life ==
Wallop was the only son of Sir Henry Wallop of Farleigh Wallop, Hampshire, and his wife, Elizabeth Corbet, daughter of Robert Corbet of Moreton Corbet, Shropshire.

== Career ==
Wallop held demesne lands in both Hampshire and Shropshire, including a manor called "Fitch" which has not been identified by historians, but was potentially located in Shropshire.

In 1621, Wallop was elected Member of Parliament for Andover and re-elected in 1624. In 1625, he was elected MP for Hampshire and re-elected in 1626. He was elected MP for Andover again in 1628 and sat until 1629, when King Charles decided to rule without parliament for eleven years.

Wallop refused to contribute towards the Bishops' War of 1639–40 out of antipathy to the king. In April 1640, he was elected MP for Andover for the Short Parliament and was re-elected for the Long Parliament in November 1640.

He supported parliament in the Civil War, joining in all the subsequent votes against the king. Nevertheless, the king had such confidence in Wallop's honour that in 1645 he said to Parliament he should be willing to put the militia into Wallop's hands with many noblemen and others upon such terms as his commissioners at Uxbridge had agreed upon; however, this proposal was rejected. Wallop survived Pride's Purge to sit in the Rump Parliament and was named by the army grandees as one of the 59 commissioners who sat in judgement at the trial of Charles I. He attended the trial and sat in the Painted Chamber 15 and 22 January and in Westminster Hall 22 and 23 January, but he did not sign the death warrant.

Under the Commonwealth, Wallop was elected one of the Council of State in 1649 and 1650; however, he submitted to Cromwell's government with very great reluctance, having a determined preference for a republic. He was willing to work against the Cromwellian interest to restore his preferred parliament as a proof of his sentiments and courage. For example, when Cromwell wished to form the First Protectorate Parliament to help in the government of the Protectorate, Cromwell wished to keep Sir Henry Vane out of the parliament. He prevented Vane being returned at Kingston upon Hull and Bristol, though it was said Vane had the majority of votes in those two cities. Wallop supported Vane and used his influence to have Vane chosen by the borough of Whitchurch, Hampshire, which so enraged the Cromwellian faction that they sent a menacing letter to Wallop which was signed by most of the justices of the peace for the county. The letter stated that if Wallop continued to support Vane, they would oppose Wallop's attempt to become an MP. Wallop ignored them, assisted Vane and was elected MP for Hampshire in 1654 in spite of the opposition of the justices of the peace. Wallop was re-elected in 1656 and 1659.

After the fall of the Cromwellian interest, Wallop showed his sincere zeal for the Long Parliament as the support of the republic, and they procured him a seat in 1659 in their council of state. In the following December, having assisted with others in securing Portsmouth, he received their thanks for the good and important services he had rendered them. In April 1660, he was elected MP for Whitchurch in the Convention Parliament, but did not take part in its proceedings and was disabled from sitting on 11 June.

At the restoration of the monarchy, Wallop was excepted from receiving any benefit of his estate under the Act of Indemnity and subjected to further punishment. He was brought up to the bar of the House of Commons with Lord Monson and Sir Henry Mildmay. After being required to confess his guilt, he was sentenced to be degraded from his gentility, drawn upon a sledge to and under the gallows at Tyburn with a halter around his neck and to be imprisoned for life. This sentence was solemnly executed upon him on 30 January 1662, which was the anniversary of the king's execution. He died intestate on 19 November 1667 in the Tower of London. His body was returned to Farleigh Wallop to be interred with his ancestors.

His only son Henry Wallop was the MP for Whitchurch from 1660-74.

== Family life ==
Wallop married Ann Wriothesley, daughter of Henry Wriothesley, 3rd Earl of Southampton, by whom he had a son, Henry Wallop, his only child. Henry, through the interest of the then Lord High Treasurer, his maternal uncle Thomas Wriothesley, was permitted to enjoy those estates which his father's treason had forfeited. The biographer Mark Noble suggests that it was most probable on account of his family connection to Wallop that Thomas Wriothesley was so extremely strenuous in favour of those regicides who had surrendered.

Henry married Dorothy Bluet, youngest daughter of John Bluet, and had four sons: Robert, who died in his father's lifetime; Henry, who became heir to his father, but died unmarried; John, who next enjoyed the estate; and Charles, who died unmarried before his father. On 11 June 1720, King George I created Wallop's grandson, John, who became heir to the great estates of the family, Baron Wallop of Farley Wallop and Viscount Lymington, both in the county of Southampton.

Parliament of England
Preceded by Richard Venables; John Shuter	Member of Parliament for Andover; 1621–1624; With: John Shuter	Succeeded by Henry Wallop; Henry Shuter
Preceded by Sir Daniel Norton; Sir Robert Oxenbridge	Member of Parliament for Hampshire; 1625–1626; With: Henry Whitehead 1625; Henry Wallop 1626	Succeeded by Henry Wallop; Daniel Norton
Preceded by Lord Henry Paulet; John Shuter	Member of Parliament for Andover; 1628–1629; With: Ralph Conway	Parliament suspended until 1640
Vacant Parliament suspended since 1629	Member of Parliament for Andover; 1640–1653; With: Sir Richard Wynn, 2nd Baronet 1640; Sir Henry Rainsford 1640–1641; Henry Vernon 1641–1642; Sir William Waller 1642–1648	Not represented in Barebones Parliament
Preceded by Richard Norton; Richard Major; John Hildesley	Member of Parliament for Hampshire; 1654–1659; With: Richard Norton; Richard Lord Cromwell 1654–1656; Edward Hooper 1654–1656; John Bulkeley 1654–1656; Richard Major 1654; John St Barbe 1654; Francis Rivett 1654; William Goffe 1656; Thomas Cole 1656; Richard Cobb 1656	Succeeded by Richard Norton
Preceded by Gabriel Beck; Robert Gough	Member of Parliament for Andover; 1659–1660; With: Sir William Waller 1660	Succeeded by Sir John Trott, 1st Baronet; John Collins
Vacant Not represented in the restored Rump	Member of Parliament for Whitchurch; 1660; With: Giles Hungerford	Succeeded by Henry Wallop; Giles Hungerford
