= John Hippisley (Parliamentarian) =

English privateer and politician

Sir John Hippisley was an English privateer and politician who sat in the House of Commons at various times between 1621 and 1653. He supported the Parliamentary cause in the English Civil War.

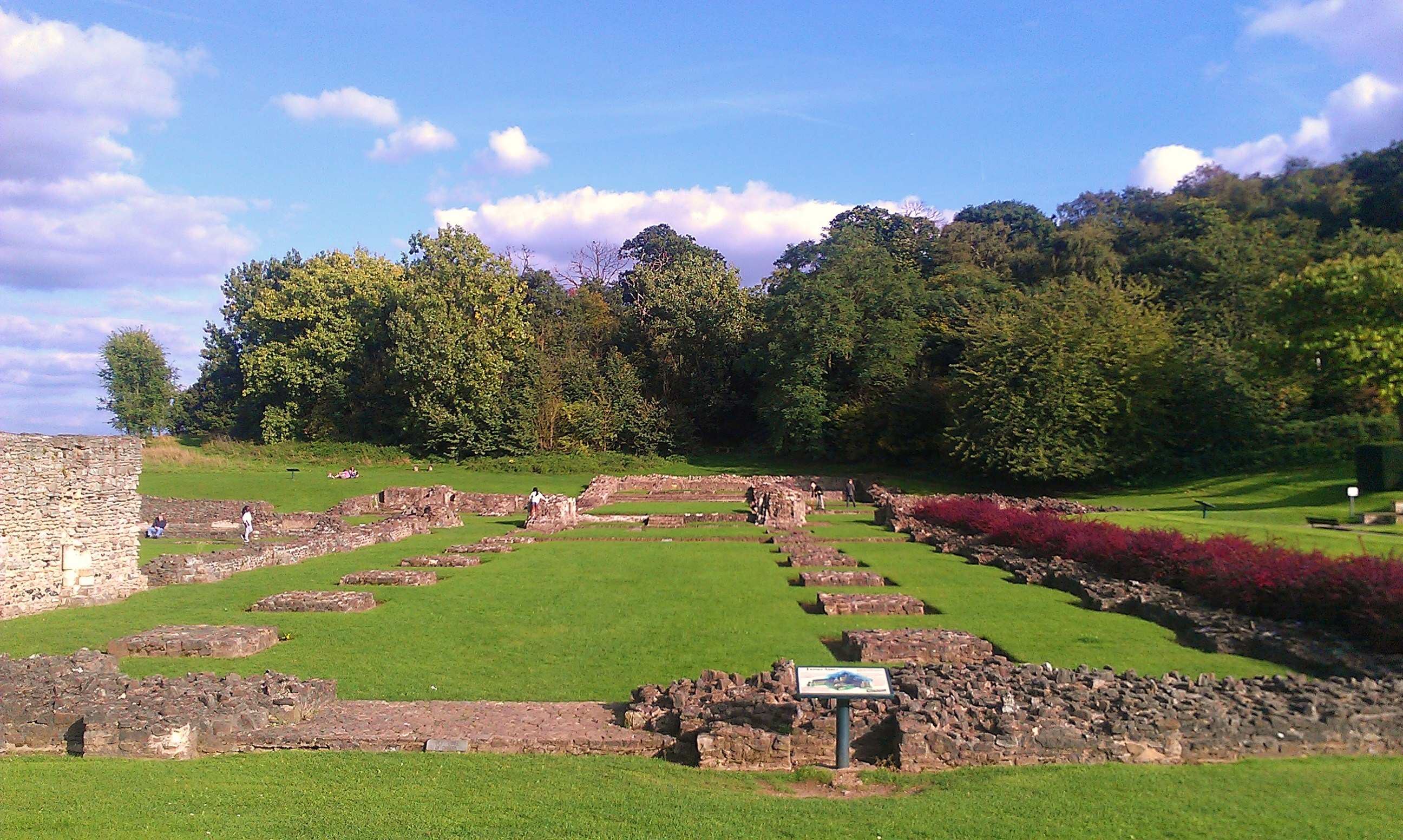
Lesnes Abbey ruins

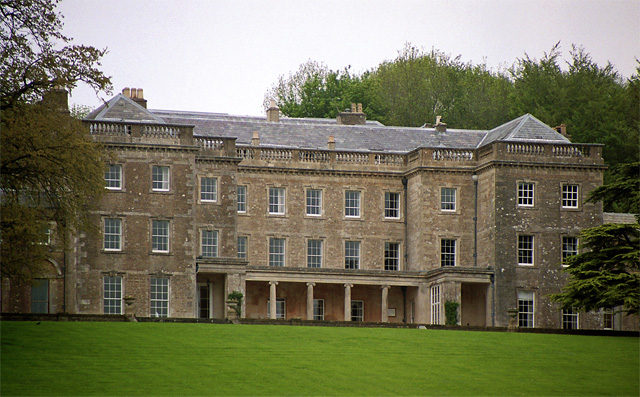
Marston House, Somerset

Hippisley was the son of William Hippisley (died 1630). He was knighted at Sheriff Hutton Park on 14 April 1617.

In 1621, he was elected member of parliament for Petersfield. He was re-elected MP for Petersfield in 1624. About this time, he purchased from Sir John Leman the manor of Lesnes and the site of Lesnes Abbey in Bexley which he later sold to Sir Thomas Gainsford, of Crowhurst, Surrey. In 1624 he was appointed Lieutenant of Dover Castle, a post he held until 1629. He was elected MP for Dover in 1625 and 1626, During his time at Dover he was involved in the wars with France and Spain and took part in privateering activities. In 1628 he was re-elected MP for Dover and sat until 1629 when King Charles decided to rule without parliament for eleven years.

In 1641 Hippisley was elected to the Long Parliament as one of the members elected to the newly enfranchised constituency of Cockermouth. About this time he sold the manor of Marston Bigot to Richard Boyle, 1st Earl of Cork. In the Civil War, Hippisley sided with parliament and was commissioner to treat with the king.

Hippisley married Catherine Norton daughter of Sir Roger Norton.

Parliament of England
Preceded by Sir Walter Tichborne; Walter Savage	Member of Parliament for Petersfield; 1621–1624; With: Richard Norton 1621–1622; Sir John Jephson 1624	Succeeded by Sir John Jephson; William Uvedale
Preceded by Sir Edward Cecil; Sir Richard Young	Member of Parliament for Dover; 1625–1629; With: William Beecher 1625; John Pringle 1626; Edward Nicholas 1626–1629	Parliament suspended until 1640
New constituency	Member of Parliament for Cockermouth; 1641–1653; With: Sir John Fenwick, 1st Baronet 1641; Sir Thomas Sandford, 1st Baronet 1641–1644; Francis Allen 1641–1653	Not represented in Barebones Parliament
