= Matthew Cradock (MP died 1636) =

English wool merchant and politician

Matthew Cradock (Mar. 1584–1636) was an English wool merchant and politician who sat in the House of Commons at various times between 1621 and 1629.

Cradock was the son of George Cradock of Stafford. He was the first mayor Stafford in 1614. In 1615 he purchased the neglected Caverswall Castle. He built a mansion house retaining the old castle walls, to a design, it is said, of Robert Smythson or John Smythson. The three storey house has five bays each with stone mullioned and transomed windows. There is a castellated parapet and an entrance porch.

In 1621, Cradock was elected Member of Parliament for Stafford. He was re-elected MP for Stafford in 1624 and 1625. He was elected MP for Stafford again in 1628 and sat until 1629 when King Charles dispensed with parliament for eleven years.

Cradock died in 1636 and was buried in the church of St Peter at Caverswall.

Cradock married Elizabeth Fowler daughter of Richard Fowler of Harnedge Grange, Shropshire on 28 April 1612. They had a daughter Mary and a son George, who entered the Inner Temple in 1632, and died in 1643. Cradock was said to be cousin of Matthew Cradock, a financial supporter of the Puritan migration.

Parliament of England
Preceded by Sir Walter Devereux; Thomas Gibbs	Member of Parliament for Stafford; 1621–1625; With: Richard Dyott 1621-162; Sir John Offley 1624–1625	Succeeded by Sir John Offley; Bulstrode Whitlock
Preceded by Sir John Offley; Bulstrode Whitlock	Member of Parliament for Stafford; 1628–1629; With: William Wingfield	Parliament suspended until 1640
