= John Jephson =

English soldier and politician

Sir John Jephson (died 6 May 1638) was an English soldier and politician who sat in the House of Commons between 1621 and 1625. He married into two prominent Anglo-Irish families, and spent much of his career in Ireland.

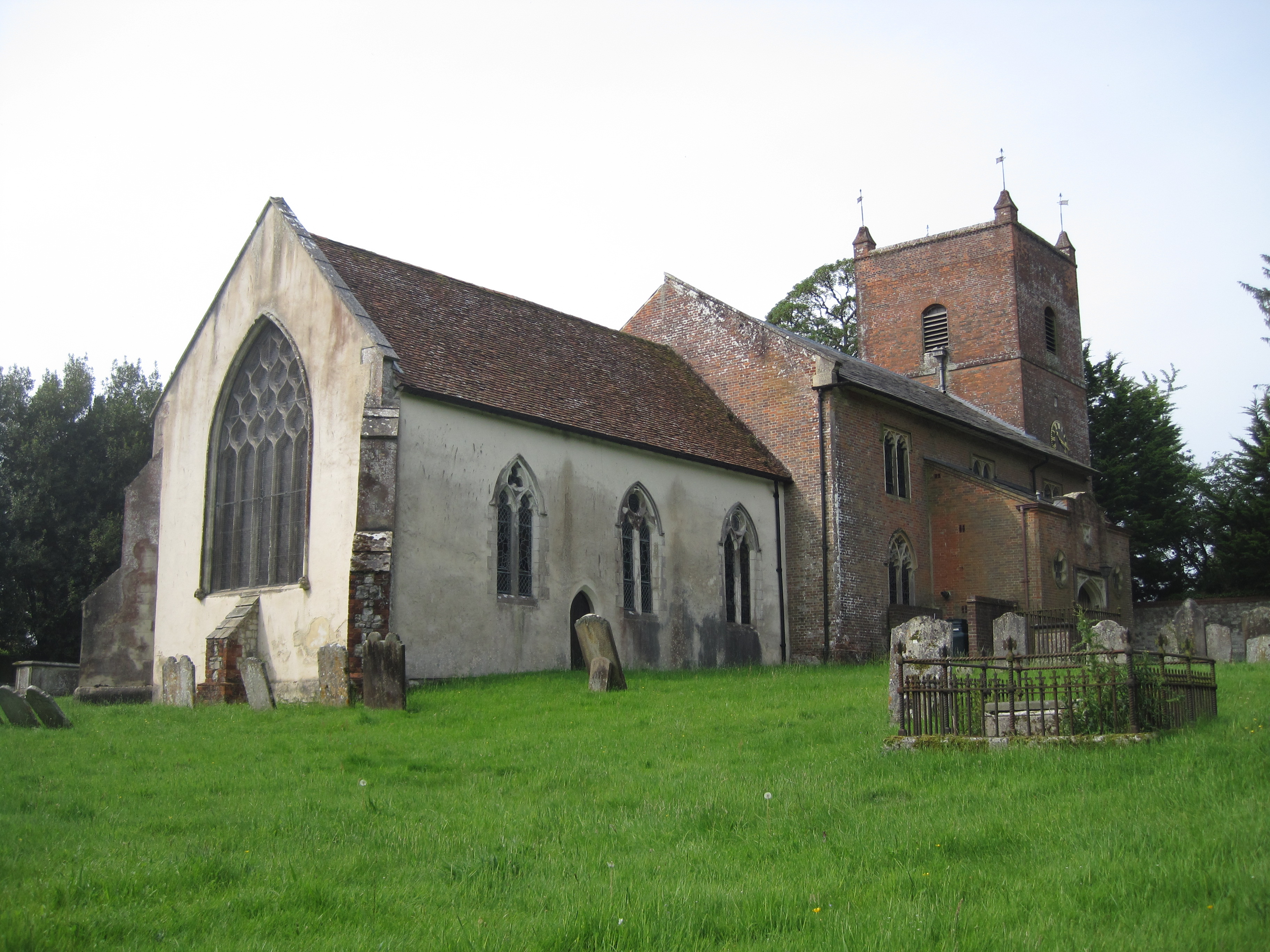
Froyle-St Marys Church

Jephson was the second son of William Jephson of Froyle, Hampshire and his wife Mary Dannett, daughter of John Dannett of Dannett's Hall, Leicestershire. In 1603, he was knighted by Sir George Carew, Lord President of Munster, at Dublin. He served in the English army in Ireland, being praised as a " gallant and worthy captain", and became a major-general. He was sworn of the Privy Council of Ireland in 1609, and spent much of his time in Ireland, even after he inherited Froyle, on the death of his elder brother. In 1620, he built his residence Froyle Place, now known as Froyle Park, a gabled U-shaped Elizabethan manor house. In 1621, Jephson was elected Member of Parliament for Hampshire. In 1624, he was elected Member of Parliament for Petersfield and was re-elected MP for Petersfield in 1625.

His career was damaged by his fierce opposition to George Villiers, 1st Duke of Buckingham, the prime Royal favourite. His Puritan leanings were also felt to be a handicap, even by his friends, particularly since they were combined with fears of a Catholic conspiracy to kill the Royal Family, although admittedly such beliefs became common enough in the 1670s, during the Popish Plot. He was valued for his knowledge of Ireland, although when he proposed an address on the misgovernment of Ireland to the King, James, who resented Jephson's attacks on his favourite Buckingham, replied coldly that a diligent Irish Councillor would have drawn these matters to his attention before raising them in public.

He did not stand for election in 1626, and retired to Ireland, where his main interests now lay, shortly afterwards, and died at Mallow in May 1638. He was not a popular man, and his death gave rise to a colourful local story that his soul had been carried off by the Devil.

Jephson married firstly Elizabeth Norreys, only daughter of Sir Thomas Norreys, Lord President of Munster and Bridget Kingsmill, daughter of Sir William Kingsmill of Sydmonton Court and Bridget Raleigh. She brought the Norreys family estates at Mallow, County Cork and elsewhere into the Jephson family: Mallow Castle, where Sir John died, remained in the family until 1984. During the English Civil War, the family were obliged to sell Froyle to cover their debts, and thereafter were increasingly associated with Ireland. John and Elizabeth had seven children, four sons and three daughters. She died in 1624, to her husband's intense grief.

Despite his genuine sense of loss, he married secondly Mary Ruish, widow of Sir Francis Ruish and formerly wife of Richard Gifford, and daughter and co-heiress of Sir Henry Duke of Castlejordan and Elizabeth Brabazon. His second marriage was also happy, and in his will, he praised his "most loving wife". He left her the contents of Castlejordan, which had evidently passed to him on marriage.

Jephson was the father of William Jephson, a leading politician of the 1640s and 1650s, and a close ally of Oliver Cromwell. Two of his other sons, John and Norreys, were distinguished Army officers.

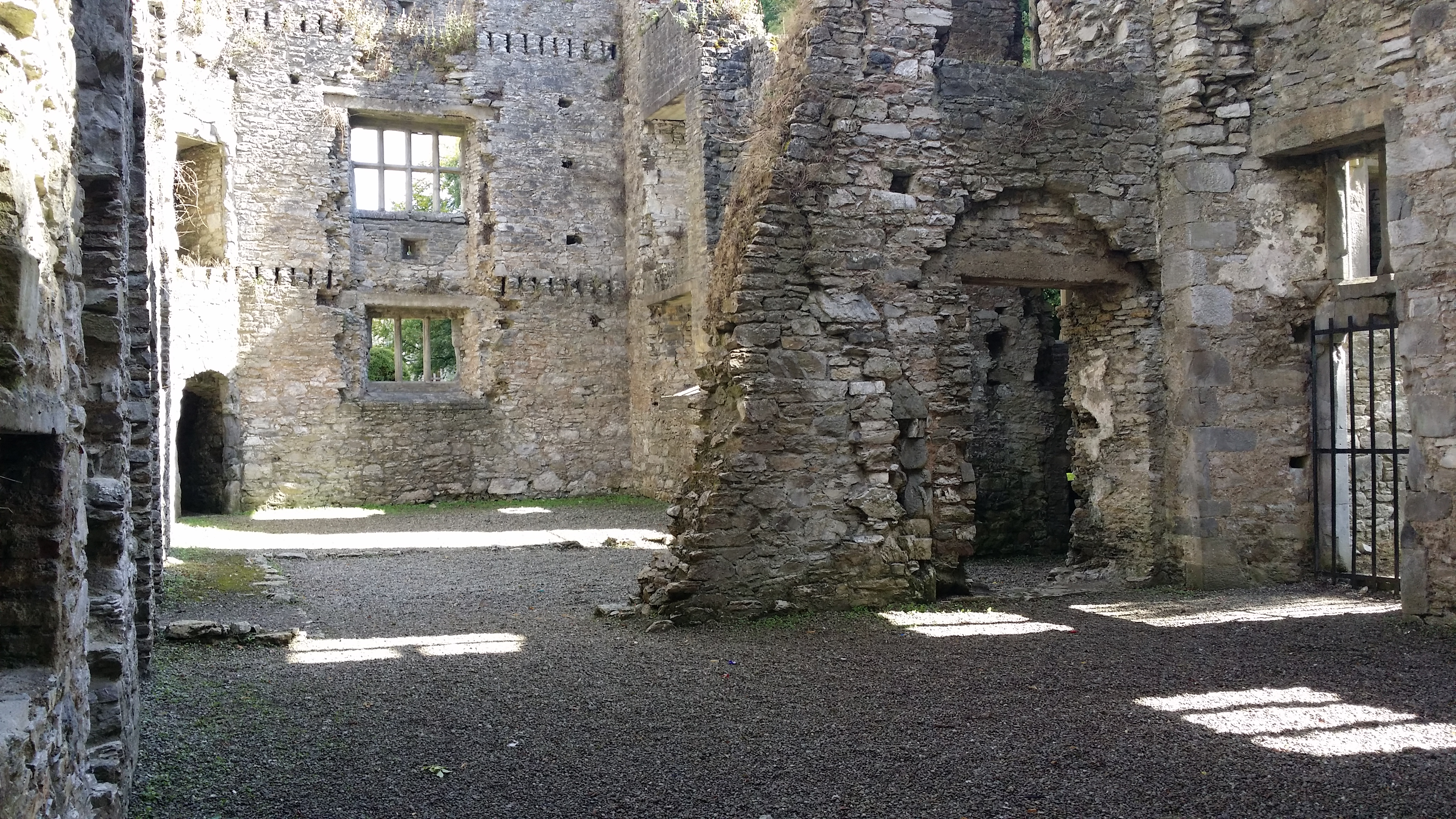
Mallow Castle, the Jephson family home for almost 400 years

Parliament of England
Preceded by Richard Tichborne; Sir William Uvedale	Member of Parliament for Hampshire; 1621–1622; With: Sir Henry Wallop	Succeeded by Sir Daniel Norton; Sir Robert Oxenbridge
Preceded by Richard Norton; John Hippisley	Member of Parliament for Petersfield; 1624–1625; With: Sir John Hippisley 1624; William Uvedale	Succeeded by Benjamin Tichborne; William Uvedale
