= Daniel Norton =

English landowner and politician

Sir Daniel Norton (1568 – 4 July 1636) was an English landowner and politician who sat in the House of Commons at various times between 1621 and 1629.

Norton was the son of Sir Richard Norton of Rotherfield. He was knighted at Whitehall on 23 July 1603. Through his marriage in 1606 he came into possession of Southwick Park He was High Sheriff of Hampshire in 1607. He built a new house on or near the site of Southwick Priory which was demolished at the beginning of the 19th century.

In 1621, he was elected Member of Parliament for Portsmouth. He was elected MP for Hampshire in 1624 and for Portsmouth again in 1625. It was while Charles I was the guest of Norton at Southwick Park, that he received the news of the assassination of the Duke of Buckingham by John Felton at Portsmouth. In 1626 he served a second term as Sheriff of Hampshire and in 1628 was elected MP for Hampshire again, sitting until 1629 when King Charles decided to rule without parliament for eleven years. Norton had joined Sir John Cooper, 1st Baronet in denouncing Arminianism in the 1628-29 parliament, and Norton was made one of the trustees for Cooper's son Anthony Ashley Cooper. He provided a home for him and his siblings at Southwick after the death of their parents and Norton chose a man with Puritan leanings named Fletcher as Cooper's tutor. Norton died at the age of 67 or 68.

== Marriage ==
Norton married Honoria White daughter of Sir John White of Southwick in about July 1606.

She was a woman of some fortitude and religious conviction. Their son Richard Norton was a Parliamentarian colonel and their daughter, Honoria, married John Eliot.

Parliament of England
Preceded by John Griffith; George Thorpe	Member of Parliament for Portsmouth; 1621–1622; With: Sir Benjamin Rudyerd	Succeeded by Sir Benjamin Rudyerd; Sir William Uvedale
Preceded by Sir Henry Wallop; Sir John Jephson	Member of Parliament for Hampshire; 1624; With: Sir Robert Oxenbridge	Succeeded by Robert Wallop; Henry Whitehead
Preceded by Sir Benjamin Rudyerd; Sir William Uvedale	Member of Parliament for Portsmouth; 1625; With: Sir Benjamin Rudyerd	Succeeded by Sir James Fullerton; Thomas Whatman
Preceded by Sir Henry Wallop; Robert Wallop	Member of Parliament for Hampshire; 1628–1629; With: Sir Henry Wallop	Parliament suspended until 1640
