= List of English by-elections (1689–1700) =

This is a list of parliamentary by-elections in England held between 1689 and 1700, with the names of the previous incumbent and the victor in the by-election.

In the absence of a comprehensive and reliable source, for party and factional alignments in this period, no attempt is made to define them in this article. The House of Commons: 1690–1715 and The House of Commons: 1660–1690 provides some guidance to the complex and shifting political relationships, but it is significant that the compilers of those works make no attempt to produce a definitive list of each members allegiances.

== Dates ==
During this period England counted its legal year as beginning on 25 March. For the purposes of this list the year is considered to have started on 1 January.

== By-elections ==
The c/u column denotes whether the by-election was a contested poll or an unopposed return. If the winner was re-elected, at the next general election and any intermediate by-elections, this is indicated by an * following the c or u. In a few cases the winner was elected at the next general election but had not been re-elected in a by-election after the one noted. In those cases no * symbol is used.

=== Convention Parliament of 1689 (1689–1690) ===
Date	Constituency	c/u	Former Incumbent	Winner	Cause
30 January 1689	Malmesbury	u	Henry Wharton	Thomas Tollemache	Chose to sit for Westmorland
31 January 1689	Bere Alston	u	Sir John Maynard	Sir John Holt	Chose to sit for Plymouth
4 February 1689	Monmouth	u	John Arnold	John Williams	Chose to sit for Southwark
8 February 1689	Great Marlow	u	Sir John Borlase	John Hoby	Death
8 February 1689	Higham Ferrers	u	Sir Rice Rudd	Lewis Watson	Chose to sit for Carmarthenshire
14 February 1689	Thetford	c*	Sir Henry Hobart	Francis Guybon	Chose to sit for Norfolk
15 February 1689	Richmond	u	Lord Conyers	Philip Darcy	Death
16 February 1689	Scarborough	u*	William Harbord	William Thompson	Chose to sit for Launceston
19 February 1689	Hampshire	c	Lord William Powlett	Thomas Jervoise	Chose to sit for Winchester
25 March 1689	Old Sarum	c*	John Young	William Harvey	Void Election
25 March 1689	Old Sarum	c	Thomas Pitt	John Hawles	Void Election
6 April 1689	Tregony	u	Charles Boscawen	Robert Harley	Death
18 April 1689	Derbyshire	u	Sir John Gell	Sir Philip Gell	Death
2 May 1689	Wareham	u	George Ryves	Thomas Skinner	Death
7 May 1689	Beverley	u	Sir John Hotham	Sir John Hotham	Death
8 May 1689	Tamworth	u	Henry Sydney	Henry Boyle	Elevated to the peerage
14 May 1689	City of London	c	William Love	Sir William Ashhurst	Death
14 May 1689	Nottinghamshire	u	Lord Houghton	John White	Succeeded to a peerage
21 May 1689	Bere Alston	u	Sir John Holt	Sir John Trevor	Appointed Lord Chief Justice
22 May 1689	Abingdon	c	Thomas Medlycott	John Southby	Void Election
22 May 1689	Abingdon	c	John Southby	Sir John Stonhouse	By-election results reversed on petition 8 January 1690.
23 May 1689	New Windsor	c	Sir Christopher Wren	Sir Algernon May	Void Election
28 May 1689	Ipswich	c*	Peyton Ventris	Sir Charles Blois	Appointed Puisne Justice of the Common Pleas
28 May 1689	Lincoln	u*	Sir Henry Monson	Sir Edward Hussey	Discharged from sitting as a non-juror.
30 May 1689	Salisbury	c*	Giles Eyre	Thomas Pitt	Appointed Puisne Justice of the King's Bench
6 June 1689	Exeter	c*	Henry Pollexfen	Christopher Bale	Appointed Chief Justice of the Common Pleas
11 June 1689	Hereford	c*	Sir William Gregory	Henry Cornewall	Appointed Puisne Justice of the King's Bench
13 June 1689	Northamptonshire	u	Edward Harby	Sir Thomas Samwell	Death
20 June 1689	Thetford	u	William Harbord	John Trenchard	Chose to sit for Launceston
25 June 1689	Newport (I.o.W.)	u	Sir Robert Dillington	Edward Dillington	Death
10 July 1689	Plymouth	c*	Arthur Herbert	John Granville	Elevated to the peerage
15 July 1689	Higham Ferrers	u*	Lewis Watson	Thomas Andrew	Succeeded to a peerage
25 July 1689	Appleby	u*	Philip Musgrave	William Cheyne	Death
9 August 1689	Hastings	c*	John Ashburnham	John Beaumont	Elevated to the peerage
18 September 1689	Mitchell	c(*)	The Viscount Fanshawe	William Coryton	Discharged from sitting as a non-juror
18 September 1689	Mitchell	c(*)	William Coryton	Humphrey Courtney	By-election results reversed on petition 17 December 1689.
19 September 1689	Dartmouth	c(*)	Charles Boone	George Booth	Death
19 September 1689	Dartmouth	c(*)	George Booth	Joseph Herne	By-election results reversed on petition 28 November 1689.
26 September 1689	Stockbridge	c	Oliver St John	William Montagu	Death
21 November 1689	Lancaster	c*	Curwen Rawlinson	Roger Kirkby	Death
25 November 1689	Southampton	c(*)	Richard Brett	Edward Fleming	Death
25 November 1689	Southampton	c(*)	Edward Fleming	Sir Charles Wyndham	By-election results reversed on petition 31 December 1689.
9 December 1689	Bletchingley	u	John Glyd	Jeffrey Amherst	Death
9 December 1689	Dorchester	c	Gerard Napier	Thomas Chafin	Death
14 December 1689	Great Marlow	u*	John Hoby	Sir William Whitelock	Death
23 December 1689	Westmorland	u	Henry Wharton	Goodwin Wharton	Death
28 December 1689	Peterborough	u*	Charles FitzWilliam	William Brownlow	Death
28 December 1689	Stockbridge	c	William Montagu	Thomas Neale	Void Election
17 January 1690	Wells	u	Thomas Wyndham	William Coward	Death

=== 2nd Parliament of William III & Mary II (1690–1695) ===
Date	Constituency	c/u	Former Incumbent	Winner	Cause
9 April 1690	St Mawes	u*	Henry Seymour	John Tredenham	Chose to sit for Totnes
10 April 1690	Taunton	u*	Sir William Portman	John Speke	Death
26 April 1690	Plympton Erle	c	Richard Strode	Sir George Treby	Void Election
26 April 1690	Plympton Erle	c	George Parker	John Pollexfen	Void Election
30 April 1690	Penryn	u	Samuel Rolle	Sidney Godolphin	Chose to sit for Devon
8 May 1690	Boston	u*	Lord Willoughby de Eresby	Peregrine Bertie	Elevated to the House of Lords through a writ in acceleration
17 May 1690	Bishop's Castle	u	Richard Mason	Walter Waring	Death
26 May 1690	Thetford	u	William Harbord	Baptist May	Chose to sit for Launceston
25 September 1690	Minehead	u*	Nathaniel Palmer	John Sanford	Chose to sit for Somerset
8 October 1690	Amersham	u	Sir William Drake	William Montagu	Death
10 October 1690	Bath	c	The Viscount Fitzhardinge	Joseph Langton	Death
14 October 1690	Sudbury	u*	Philip Gurdon	Sir Thomas Barnardiston	Death
16 October 1690	East Retford	u*	Evelyn Pierrepont	Richard Taylor	Succeeded to a peerage
18 October 1690	Minehead	u*	Francis Luttrell	Alexander Luttrell	Death
20 October 1690	Callington	u	Sir John Coryton	Jonathan Prideaux	Death
4 November 1690	Plymouth	u	John Maynard	John Trelawny	Death
5 December 1690	Preston	c	Lord Willoughby de Eresby	Sir Edward Chisenhall	Elevated to the House of Lords through a writ in acceleration
9 December 1690	Chippenham	c(*)	Richard Kent	Sir Basil Firebrace	Death
16 December 1690	Newport (Cornwall)	c*	The Viscount Newhaven	John Morice	Chose to sit for Harwich
14 January 1691	Ludlow	c	William Gower	Francis Lloyd	Void Election
14 January 1691	Ludlow	c	Thomas Hanmer	Silius Titus	Void Election
6 April 1691	Aylesbury	c	Sir Thomas Lee	Simon Mayne	Death
20 April 1691	Hindon	u	Thomas Chafin	The Viscount Fitzhardinge	Death
20 April 1691	Tiverton	u	Samuel Foote	Sir Anthony Keck	Death
4 May 1691	Stockbridge	c	William Montagu	Thomas Jervoise	Death
22 May 1691	Weymouth and Melcombe Regis	u*	Nicholas Gould	Thomas Freke	Death
5 June 1691	Weobley	c(*)	John Birch	Thomas Foley	Death (Two MPs elected due to a Double Return)
5 June 1691	Weobley	c(*)	John Birch	John Birch	Death (Two MPs elected due to a Double Return)
5 June 1691	Weobley	c(*)	Thomas Foley	Thomas Foley	Foley declared elected 12 November 1691
5 June 1691	Weobley	c(*)	John Birch	Thomas Foley	Foley declared elected 12 November 1691
26 October 1691	Chipping Wycombe	u*	William Jephson	Charles Godfrey	Death
27 October 1691	Nottinghamshire	u*	William Sacheverell	John White	Death
27 October 1691	Rochester	u	Francis Clerke	Caleb Banks	Death
30 October 1691	Ripon	u*	Sir Edmund Jennings	Jonathan Jennings	Death
30 October 1691	Saltash	u	Richard Carew	Narcissus Luttrell	Death
31 October 1691	Calne	c	Henry Bayntun	William Wyndham	Death
6 November 1691	Dunwich	c(*)	Sir Philip Skippon	John Bence	Death (Two MPs elected due to a Double Return)
6 November 1691	Dunwich	c(*)	Sir Philip Skippon	Henry Heveningham	Death (Two MPs elected due to a Double Return)
6 November 1691	Dunwich	c(*)	John Bence	John Bence	Bence declared elected 8 December 1691
6 November 1691	Dunwich	c(*)	Henry Heveningham	John Bence	Bence declared elected 8 December 1691
9 November 1691	Westminster	c*	William Pulteney	Sir Stephen Fox	Death
16 November 1691	Hampshire	u	Richard Norton	Robert Henley	Death
16 November 1691	Kent	u	Sir Vere Fane	Sir Thomas Roberts	Succeeded to a peerage
18 November 1691	Montgomery Boroughs	u*	Charles Herbert	Price Devereux	Death
14 December 1691	Chippenham	c	Sir Basil Firebrace	Sir Basil Firebrace	Void Election
14 December 1691	Chippenham	c	Sir Basil Firebrace	Thomas Tollemache	By-election results reversed on petition 22 January 1692
15 December 1691	Bere Alston	u	Sir Francis Drake	John Smith	Chose to sit for Tavistock
18 December 1691	Newton	u	Sir John Chicheley	John Bennet	Death
2 January 1692	Bramber	u*	William Egerton	Harry Mordaunt	Death
8 January 1692	Newcastle-under-Lyme	u*	Sir William Leveson Gower	Sir John Leveson Gower	Death
11 January 1692	Whitchurch	u*	Henry Wallop	Christopher Stokes	Death
3 February 1692	Malmesbury	u	Sir James Long	George Booth	Death
24 February 1692	Bridgwater	c	Henry Bull	Robert Balch	Death
28 April 1692	Scarborough	u	William Thompson	John Hungerford	Death
23 May 1692	Carlisle	u	Jeremiah Bubb	William Lowther	Death
9 November 1692	Plympton Erle	u*	Sir George Treby	Sir Thomas Trevor	Appointed Chief Justice of the Common Pleas
11 November 1692	Saltash	u	Sir John Carew	Michael Hill	Death
12 November 1692	Colchester	u*	Edward Cary	Isaac Rebow	Death
14 November 1692	Tewkesbury	c*	Sir Henry Capell	Sir Francis Winnington	Elevated to the peerage
15 November 1692	Launceston	c*	William Harbord	Lord Hyde	Death
21 November 1692	Cambridge University	c*	Sir Robert Sawyer	Henry Boyle	Death
24 November 1692	Grampound	u	Walter Vincent	John Buller	Death
24 November 1692	Morpeth	u*	Viscount Morpeth	George Nicholas	Succeeded to a peerage
29 November 1692	Radnorshire	u*	Richard Williams	John Jeffreys	Death
13 December 1692	Newport (I.o.W.)	u	Sir Robert Holmes	Richard Leveson	Death
14 December 1692	Totnes	u	Sir John Fowell	Thomas Coulson	Death
6 January 1693	Newark	c*	Nicholas Saunderson	Sir Francis Molyneux	Death
9 January 1693	Hampshire	u*	Robert Henley	Richard Norton	Death
10 January 1693	Essex	c	Henry Mildmay	John Lamotte Honywood	Death
18 January 1693	East Grinstead	u	Thomas Sackville	Simon Smith	Death
8 February 1693	Herefordshire	u*	Sir John Morgan	Sir Edward Harley	Death
2 March 1693	City of London	c*	Sir William Turner	Sir John Fleet	Death
21 April 1693	Knaresborough	u*	William Stockdale	Christopher Walters	Death
20 November 1693	Bath	u*	Sir William Bassett	William Blathwayt	Death
20 November 1693	Stockbridge	c	Richard Whithed	Anthony Rowe	Death
20 November 1693	New Windsor	u*	William Adderley	Sir William Scawen	Death
28 November 1693	Bodmin	u*	Sir John Cutler	Russell Robartes	Death
30 November 1693	Clitheroe	c*	Anthony Parker	Fitton Gerard	Death
5 December 1693	Worcester	c(*)	Sir John Somers	Samuel Swift	Appointed Lord Keeper
5 December 1693	Worcester	c(*)	Samuel Swift	Charles Cocks	By-election results reversed on petition 7 February 1694
7 December 1693	Maldon	c*	Sir Thomas Darcy	Sir Eliab Harvey	Death
7 December 1693	Staffordshire	u	Walter Chetwynd	Sir Walter Bagot	Death
11 December 1693	Cardigan Boroughs	u*	Hector Phillips	John Lewis	Death
11 December 1693	Scarborough	c*	Francis Thompson	The Viscount of Irvine	Death
21 December 1693	Cambridgeshire	c*	Sir Levinus Bennet	The Lord Cutts	Death
23 December 1693	Huntingdonshire	u	Robert Montagu	John Proby	Death
20 January 1694	Arundel	c*	William Morley	Lord Walden	Death
20 January 1694	Arundel	c*	Lord Walden	John Cooke	By-election results reversed on petition 22 February 1694
24 January 1694	Wigan	c	Sir Richard Standish	John Byrom	Death
6 February 1694	Lancashire	u*	Viscount Brandon	Sir Ralph Assheton	Succeeded to a peerage
9 February 1694	Rye	u*	John Darell	Thomas Frewen	Death
23 February 1694	Clitheroe	c(*)	Fitton Gerard	Fitton Gerard	Void Election (Two MPs elected due to a Double Return)
23 February 1694	Clitheroe	c(*)	Fitton Gerard	Christopher Lister	Void Election (Two MPs elected due to a Double Return)
23 February 1694	Clitheroe	c(*)	Fitton Gerard	Fitton Gerard	Gerard declared elected 17 April 1694
23 February 1694	Clitheroe	c(*)	Christopher Lister	Fitton Gerard	Gerard declared elected 17 April 1694
23 February 1694	Essex	c*	John Lamotte Honywood	Sir Charles Barrington	Death
23 February 1694	Okehampton	u*	Henry Northleigh	John Burrington	Death
9 March 1694	Northampton	u*	Sir Thomas Samwell	Sir Justinian Isham	Death
16 March 1694	Tregony	u	Sir John Tremayne	The Earl of Kildare	Death
31 March 1694	Bury St Edmunds	u*	Henry Goldwell	John Hervey	Death
April 1694	Bossiney	c	Sir Peter Colleton	Humphrey Nicoll	Death
14 May 1694	Bere Alston	u*	Sir John Fagg	Sir Robert Fagg	Death
19 November 1694	Bewdley	u*	Henry Herbert	Salwey Winnington	Elevated to the peerage
19 November 1694	Chippenham	c	Thomas Tollemache	Richard Long	Death
19 November 1694	Colchester	u	Samuel Reynolds	Sir Thomas Cooke	Death
19 November 1694	Great Bedwyn	u*	The Viscount Falkland	Francis Stonehouse	Death
21 November 1694	Stafford	u*	Jonathan Cope	Thomas Foley	Death
23 November 1694	Stockbridge	u	Anthony Rowe	George Pitt	Void Election
26 November 1694	Carlisle	u	William Lowther	James Lowther	Death
3 December 1694	Norwich	u	Hugh Bokenham	John Ward	Death
4 December 1694	Liverpool	c(*)	Viscount Colchester	Thomas Brotherton	Succeeded to a peerage
4 December 1694	Liverpool	c(*)	Thomas Brotherton	Jasper Maudit	By-election results reversed on petition 11 January 1695
6 December 1694	Stamford	u*	William Hyde	Philip Bertie	Death
13 December 1694	Appleby	u	Charles Boyle	Sir John Walter	Succeeded to a peerage
16 December 1694	Rutland	u	Sir Thomas Mackworth	Sir Thomas Mackworth	Death
19 December 1694	Cardiganshire	u*	Sir Carbery Pryse	John Vaughan	Death
16 January 1695	Ludgershall	c*	John Deane	John Richmond Webb	Death
24 January 1695	Marlborough	c*	Sir George Willoughby	Thomas Bennet	Death
26 February 1695	East Grinstead	u	Simon Smith	The Earl of Orrery	Death
14 March 1695	Bishop's Castle	c*	William Oakeley	Richard More	Death. Two MPs elected due to a Double Return. Parliament was dissolved before the election was decided.
14 March 1695	Bishop's Castle	c	William Oakeley	Henry Newton	Death. Two MPs elected due to a Double Return. Parliament was dissolved before the election was decided.
2 April 1695	Yarmouth	c*	Sir John Trevor	Henry Holmes	Expulsion
15 April 1695	Scarborough	u*	John Hungerford	Sir Charles Hotham	Expulsion
8 May 1695	Newark	c*	Lord Savile	Sir George Markham	Succeeded to a peerage
21 May 1695	Poole	u*	Sir John Trenchard	Lord Ashley	Death

=== 3rd Parliament of William III (1695–1698) ===
Date	Constituency	c/u	Former Incumbent	Winner	Cause
2 December 1695	Newport (I.o.W.)	u	The Lord Cutts	Sir Henry Colt	Chose to sit for Cambridgeshire
3 December 1695	Hedon	u*	Sir William Trumbull	Hugh Bethell	Chose to sit for Oxford
3 December 1695	Hedon	u	Lord Spencer	Thomas Frankland	Chose to sit for Tiverton
9 December 1695	Nottingham	u*	Charles Hutchinson	William Pierrepont	Death
10 December 1695	Bere Alston	u	Sir Rowland Gwynne	Sir Henry Hobart	Chose to sit for Norfolk
11 December 1695	Gloucestershire	u	Sir John Guise	Thomas Stephens	Death
19 December 1695	Portsmouth	c	Edward Russell	Matthew Aylmer	Chose to sit for Cambridgeshire (Two MPs elected due to a Double Return.)
19 December 1695	Portsmouth	c*	Edward Russell	John Gibson	Chose to sit for Cambridgeshire (Two MPs elected due to a Double Return.)
8 January 1696	Middlesex	c	Edward Russell	Sir John Bucknall	Chose to sit for Cambridgeshire
10 January 1696	Thetford	u*	Sir Joseph Williamson	James Sloane	Chose to sit for Rochester
1 February 1696	Portsmouth	c*	John Gibson	John Gibson	By-election voided due to a Double Return
1 February 1696	Portsmouth	c*	Matthew Aylmer	John Gibson	By-election voided due to a Double Return
17 February 1696	Maidstone	u	Sir Thomas Taylor	Thomas Rider	Death
24 February 1696	Buckinghamshire	c*	Thomas Wharton	William Cheyne	Succeeded to a peerage
28 March 1696	Chipping Wycombe	u	Thomas Lewes	Fleetwood Dormer	Death
1 April 1696	Camelford	u	Ambrose Manaton	Sidney Wortley Montagu	Chose to sit for Tavistock
September 1696	Aldborough	c	Sir Michael Wentworth	Henry Fairfax	Death
28 October 1696	Queenborough	u*	Caleb Banks	Thomas King	Death
2 November 1696	Winchelsea	u	Robert Austen	Sir George Chute	Death
5 November 1696	Gatton	c	Sir John Thompson	George Evelyn	Elevated to the peerage
6 November 1696	Cambridge	u*	John Pepys	Sir John Cotton	Death
10 November 1696	Ipswich	u*	Sir John Barker	Richard Phillips	Death
10 November 1696	Tavistock	c*	Ambrose Manaton	Sir Francis Drake	Death
12 November 1696	Liskeard	u*	Sir Bourchier Wrey	Henry Darell	Death
12 November 1696	Westmorland	u*	Sir John Lowther	William Fleming	Elevated to the peerage
21 November 1696	St Mawes	c	Seymour Tredenham	Henry Seymour Portman	Death
27 November 1696	New Romney	u*	Sir William Twysden	Sir Charles Sedley	Chose to sit for Appleby
1 December 1696	Malmesbury	u	Goodwin Wharton	Sir Thomas Skipwith	Chose to sit for Cockermouth
31 December 1696	Buckinghamshire	c	Sir Richard Atkins	Henry Neale	Death
10 February 1697	Caernarvonshire	u*	Sir William Williams	Thomas Bulkeley	Death
17 February 1697	Breconshire	c	Edward Jones	Sir Edward Williams	Death
25 February 1697	Lancaster	u	Thomas Preston	Fitton Gerard	Death
4 March 1697	Orford	u	Sir Adam Felton	Sir John Duke	Death
6 March 1697	Mitchell	c	Humphrey Courtney	John Tregagle	Death
6 March 1697	Mitchell	c*	Thomas Vyvyan	John Povey	Chose to sit for Fowey
8 April 1697	Flint Boroughs	c	Sir Roger Puleston	Thomas Ravenscroft	Death
14 December 1697	Eye	u*	Thomas Davenant	Joseph Jekyll	Death
14 December 1697	Huntingdon	u*	Richard Montagu	Francis Wortley Montagu	Death
15 December 1697	Dover	c*	James Chadwick	Matthew Aylmer	Death
17 December 1697	Buckingham	u*	Sir Richard Temple	Sir Richard Temple	Death
17 December 1697	Cambridgeshire	c*	Edward Russell	Sir Rushout Cullen	Elevated to the peerage
18 December 1697	Grantham	c*	Sir John Brownlow	Sir John Thorold	Death
22 December 1697	Bridport	c*	Nicholas Carey	Peter Battiscombe	Death
22 December 1697	Hindon	c	Charles Morley	Henry Lee	Death
23 December 1697	Appleby	u*	Sir William Twysden	Sir John Walter	Death
28 December 1697	Northallerton	u*	Thomas Lascelles	Ralph Milbancke	Death
30 December 1697	Hertfordshire	c*	Sir Thomas Blount	Ralph Freman	Death
12 January 1698	Chester	u	Roger Whitley	Thomas Cowper	Death
17 January 1698	Aldborough	u	Henry Fairfax	William Wentworth	Void Election
21 February 1698	Downton	u	Charles Duncombe	Maurice Bocland	Expulsion
2 March 1698	Weymouth and Melcombe Regis	u*	John Knight	Philip Taylor	Expulsion
11 March 1698	Evesham	c*	Sir James Rushout	John Rudge	Death
16 March 1698	Saltash	u	Francis Buller	Francis Pengelly	Death
18 March 1698	Bedford	u*	Thomas Hillersden	William Spencer	Death
29 March 1698	Whitchurch	u*	Christopher Stokes	Richard Wollaston	Death
11 April 1698	Sandwich	c*	Edward Brent	John Thurbarne	Death
23 May 1698	Downton	u*	Sir Charles Raleigh	John Eyre	Death
30 May 1698	Lymington	u	John Burrard	William Tulse	Death
3 June 1698	Eye	u*	Charles Cornwallis	Spencer Compton	Succeeded to a peerage
4 June 1698	Huntingdonshire	u	Heneage Montagu	Robert Apreece	Death

=== 4th Parliament of William III (1698–1700) ===
Date	Constituency	c/u	Former Incumbent	Winner	Cause
22 December 1698	Buckingham	c*	Alexander Denton	Edmund Denton	Death
30 December 1698	Bere Alston	u	Sir Rowland Gwynne	James Montagu	Chose to sit for Breconshire
31 December 1698	Seaford	u	Sir William Thomas	William Campion	Chose to sit for Sussex
2 January 1699	Amersham	u	The Viscount Newhaven	John Drake	Chose to sit for Buckinghamshire
2 January 1699	Stockbridge	u*	George Pitt	John Pitt	Chose to sit for Wareham
9 January 1699	Newport (I.o.W.)	c	The Lord Cutts	Henry Greenhill	Chose to sit for Cambridgeshire
11 January 1699	Totnes	u	Sir Edward Seymour	Francis Gwyn	Chose to sit for Exeter
14 January 1699	Droitwich	u*	Thomas Foley	Thomas Foley	Chose to sit for Stafford
16 January 1699	Grampound	u*	John Tanner	Francis Scobell	Chose to sit for St Germans
16 January 1699	Penryn	c*	James Vernon	Alexander Pendarves	Chose to sit for Westminster
16 January 1699	Thetford	c	Sir Joseph Williamson	Lord Paston	Chose to sit for Rochester
17 January 1699	East Looe	u*	Charles Trelawny	Sir Henry Seymour	Chose to sit for Plymouth
21 January 1699	Chipping Wycombe	c	John Archdale	Thomas Archdale	Refused to take the oaths
23 January 1699	Rye	u*	Sir John Austen	Sir Robert Austen	Death
25 January 1699	Saltash	u*	John Specott	James Buller	Chose to sit for Cornwall
26 January 1699	Cricklade	u*	Charles Fox	Sir Stephen Fox	Chose to sit for Salisbury
27 January 1699	Newport (Cornwall)	c*	John Morice	Francis Stratford	Chose to sit for Saltash
6 February 1699	Sudbury	c	Sir Thomas Barnardiston	John Gurdon	Death
22 February 1699	Aylesbury	c	Sir Thomas Lee	Robert Dormer	Void Election
23 February 1699	Banbury	u	James Isaacson	Sir John Cope	Expulsion (Commissioner of Stamp Duties)
23 February 1699	Shaftesbury	u*	Henry Cornish	Thomas Chafin	Expulsion (Commissioner of Stamp Duties)
24 February 1699	Bramber	u	Sir Henry Furnese	John Courthope	Expulsion (Director of the East India Company)
25 February 1699	Harwich	u	Samuel Atkinson	Sir Thomas Middleton	Expulsion (Commissioner of Hawkers and Pedlars)
7 March 1699	Whitchurch	u*	Richard Wollaston	Richard Wollaston	Expulsion (Receiver-General of Taxes in Herefordshire)
14 March 1699	Maldon	u	Sir Eliab Harvey	John Bullock	Death
1 April 1699	Bramber	u	John Courthope	John Asgill	Death
8 April 1699	Huntingdonshire	u*	Robert Throckmorton	John Dryden	Death
26 April 1699	Corfe Castle	c*	William Culliford	Richard Fownes	Void Election
9 May 1699	Bridgnorth	u*	Sir William Whitmore	Roger Pope	Death
10 May 1699	Somerset	u	Sir Edward Phelips	Nathaniel Palmer	Death
16 May 1699	Devon	u	Francis Courtenay	Thomas Drewe	Death
28 November 1699	Bridgwater	u	Roger Hoar	Sir Francis Warre	Death
28 November 1699	Newcastle-under-Lyme	c*	Sir Thomas Bellot	Rowland Cotton	Death
29 November 1699	Nottingham	c	Richard Slater	Robert Sacheverell	Death
29 November 1699	Oxfordshire	c	Lord Norreys	Sir Robert Dashwood	Succeeded to a peerage
30 November 1699	Great Grimsby	c*	Sir Edward Ayscough	Thomas Vyner	Death
4 December 1699	Warwick	u	Robert Greville	Algernon Greville	Death
8 December 1699	Hereford	u	Paul Foley	Samuel Pytts	Death
12 December 1699	Shropshire	u*	Edward Kynaston	Robert Lloyd	Death
16 December 1699	Dartmouth	c*	Joseph Herne	Nathaniel Herne	Death (Two MPs elected due to a Double Return. Results voided 12 February 1700. No by-election held.)
16 December 1699	Dartmouth	c	Joseph Herne	Rowland Holt	Death (Two MPs elected due to a Double Return. Results voided 12 February 1700. No by-election held.)
20 December 1699	Glamorganshire	u*	Bussy Mansel	Thomas Mansel	Death
27 December 1699	Southampton	c*	Sir Benjamin Newland	Roger Mompesson	Death
4 January 1700	St Germans	u*	John Tanner	Henry Fleming	Death
29 January 1700	Dunwich	u*	Sir Robert Rich	Sir Charles Blois	Death
1 February 1700	Pontefract	c*	John Bright	John Bright	Void Election
8 February 1700	Thetford	c	James Sloane	James Sloane	Void Election
16 February 1700	Sudbury	u*	Samuel Kekewich	Sir Gervase Elwes	Death
