= Praed =

Praed may refer to

People

- Cyril Mackworth-Praed (1891–1974), British Olympic athlete
- Herbert Mackworth-Praed (1841–1921), British landowner, magistrate, banker, benefactor and Conservative politician
- Winthrop Mackworth Praed (1802–1839), British politician and poet
- William Mackworth Praed (1694–1752), English lawyer and politician
- Bulkley Praed (1799-1876), English cricketer
- James Praed (died 1687), English politician
- James Praed (died 1706), English politician
- John Praed (c. 1657–1717), English merchant and politician
- Michael Praed (born 1960), British actor
- Rosa Campbell Praed (1851–1935), Australian writer
- William Praed (1747–1833), English businessman, banker and politician
- PRAED (2006), Music group by Raed Yassin and Paed Conca

Places

- Praed Street in London
- Praed Point in Papua New Guinea
  - Praed Point Battery, an artillery battery

Other

- A Praed Street Dossier, a collection of stories by August Derleth
