= Mitford Crowe =

British diplomat and colonial administrator (1669–1719)

- 1703 portrait

Governor of Barbados
- In office 1707–1710
- Monarch: Queen Anne
- Preceded by: Sir Bevil Granville
- Succeeded by: George Lillington

Member of Parliament for Southampton
- In office 1701–1702
- Preceded by: Roger Mompesson; John Smith
- Succeeded by: Frederick Tylney; Adam de Cardonnel

Personal details
- Born: 18 April 1669 Hexham, Northumberland
- Died: 15 December 1719 (aged 50) England
- Spouse: Urania Sandiford (m. 1697)
- Profession: Diplomat, merchant, politician, colonial administrator

Colonel Mitford Crowe (18 April 1669 – 15 December 1719) was a British diplomat, merchant, politician and colonial administrator who sat in the Parliament of England from 1701 to 1702 and served as the governor of Barbados from 1707 to 1710. He is best known for his career during the War of the Spanish Succession, where Crowe negotiated the Pact of Genoa with the Principality of Catalonia, which brought them into the Grand Alliance.

Born in April 1669 in Hexham, Northumberland, Crowe was apprenticed to a merchant in Barbados growing up before moving to Barcelona at some point before 1697. Three years later, he moved to London to work as a merchant, being appointed as a colonial agent for Barbados in the same year. In England, Crowe began to pursue a political career, being elected to the House of Commons in February 1701 and sitting there until July 1702.

In 1705, Crowe was appointed as a diplomatic envoy to Catalonia to foster support for the Habsburg candidate for the vacant Spanish throne during the War of the Spanish Succession. Eventually managing to make contact with a group of pro-Habsburg Spaniards, Crowe signed a military alliance between England and Catalonia with them on 17 May. He was also charged with advising the English military during their campaigns in Catalonia.

Crowe was appointed as governor of Barbados in October 1706, arriving there in May 1707. As governor, Crowe undertook several controversial decisions which led to several complaints from his political rivals in Barbados that he was acting in a heavy-handed and autocratic manner. He was eventually recalled to England in 1710, where Crowe defended himself from the Privy Council before retiring from public life and dying in 1719.

== Early life ==
Mitford Crowe was born in April 1669 and baptised on the 18th in Hexham, Northumberland. His father was Patrick Crowe, a justice of the peace from Ashington, Northumberland. Crowe's mother was Anne Mitford, who disappeared from historical records after 1689. Growing up, Crowe travelled to Barbados and was apprenticed to a merchant there named Mr Tillard, but by 1697 was living in Barcelona.

In January 1697, Crowe wrote a letter to King William III of England containing important information, which brought him to the attention of the English government. By 1700, Crowe had moved to London to work as a merchant and was appointed in December of that year as a colonial agent for Barbados to present a request for improvements to the colony's fortifications to the Commissioners for Trade and Plantations.

Beginning in 1701, Crowe pursued a political career, being elected to the English House of Commons in February 1701. He continued to sit in Parliament until November of that year and was elected to the House of Commons for a second stint which lasted from December 1701 to July 1702. On 29 January 1702, William III appointed Crowe as governor of Barbados, but this was overturned after the king died shortly thereafter.

== Diplomatic career ==
On 18 March 1705, Crowe was appointed by the English Crown as a diplomatic envoy to the Principality of Catalonia to promote support there for the Habsburg candidate to the Spanish throne, Archduke Charles. This took place during the War of the Spanish Succession, a conflict between a pro-Habsburg coalition known as the Grand Alliance on one side and the Bourbon kingdoms of France and Spain on the other over who would succeed to the Spanish throne after Charles II's death.

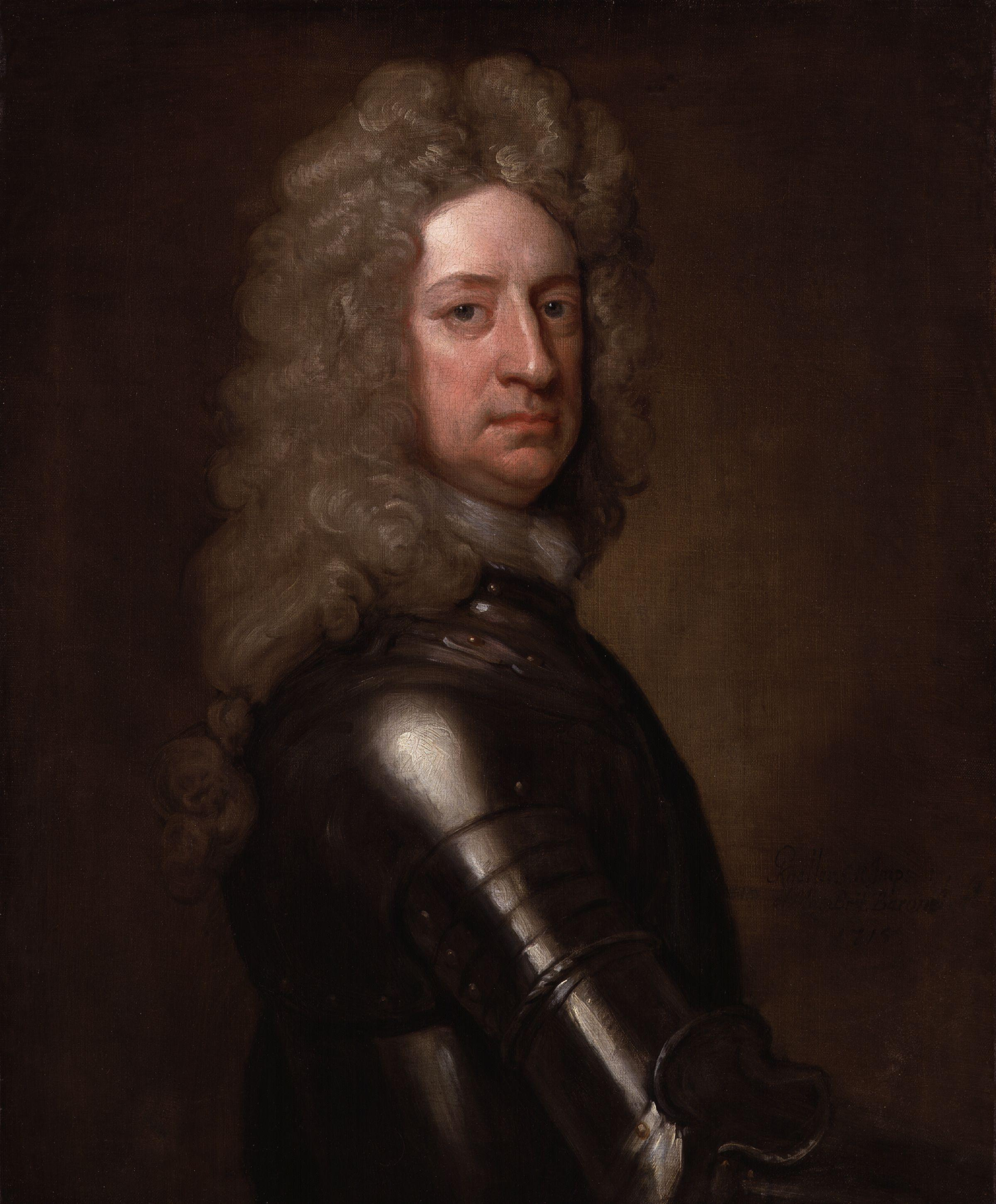
Lord Peterborough, whom Crowe advised during the War of the Spanish Succession

While in Spain, Crowe established a relationship with pro-Habsburg Spaniards, who were known as the "Austracists". However, Crowe's attempts to negotiate a treaty with them were hampered by severe crackdowns overseen by the viceroy of Catalonia Francisco de Velasco y Tovar, Conde de Melgar, who undertook reprisals against Austracist sympathisers in the region after the aborted invasion of Barcelona in May 1704. Crowe eventually managed to make contact with a group of pro-Habsburg Spanish aristocrats and landowners from the Plain of Vic region.

At the Santa Eulàlia de Riuprimer, Crowe and a group of Austracists negotiated a military alliance between the Kingdom of England and Principality of Catalonia known as the "Pact of Genoa" on 17 May 1705. The alliance, which was signed in the local church, stipulated that (among other terms) the English would deploy an army of 10,000 men to Catalonia, supply Catalonian forces with military equipment, and the Catalans would recognise Archduke Charles as the King of Spain. The treaty was also to be kept secret until pro-Habsburg forces had captured Barcelona.

Three days later on 20 May, Crowe travelled to Genoa under orders from English statesman Sidney Godolphin, 1st Baron Godolphin to further his diplomatic efforts. In the same month, a Royal Navy fleet led by Sir Cloudesley Shovell (carrying on board a large English Army force commanded by Charles Mordaunt, 3rd Earl of Peterborough) set sail for Catalonia to lay siege to Barcelona. Shovell was ordered by his superiors to remain in contact with Crowe to determine when to attack the city, who dispatched reports to the fleet claiming that the Catalonians were eager to rebel.

The English force eventually arrived at Barcelona and captured it after a siege which lasted from 14 September to 19 October. After the city was captured, Crowe set sail for Barcelona, arriving there on 2 November. There, he joined forces with the Earl of Peterborough to advise him on future military operations in Catalonia; though Crowe's "seemingly over-confident style" led to the Earl of Peterborough becoming wary of him, the earl was soon won over by Crowe. Crowe was then appointed as an envoy-extraordinary to the Austracists to sign a commercial treaty with them.

== Governorship and death ==
In October 1706, Crowe was appointed as the governor of Barbados, arriving at the colony on 8 May 1707. After he had arrived at Barbados, Crowe denounced the colonial government, claiming that it was "in the last distraction, nothing but corruption and parties." In addition to improving the colony's defences, he also suspended several members of the executive council, dismissed several justices of the peace and militia officers, relied mostly on the House of Assembly instead of the council, and attempted to break the power held by a small group of barristers.

These actions made him extremely unpopular among the Barbadian establishment, who accused him of "siding with factions, possessing an arbitrary attitude, and acting as the supreme legal authority of the island." Further complaints were lodged that Crowe accepted bribes, imprisoned people without trial, committed indecent assault against the wife and sister of a prominent planter, and employed a Catholic as a personal servant; British historian J. D. Davies noted that the final charge was "perhaps most damning of all" given the dominance of Protestantism in Barbados.

The charges against Crowe were motivated in part by his political favouritism in the Barbadian political scene, though given the fact that he had previously spent time in Barbados, "he was hardly likely to be an impartial adjudicator". In 1708, the Commissioners for Trade and Plantations rebuked Crowe twice for his conduct in Barbados, and in July 1709 Queen Anne herself sent him a letter expressing her anger with Crowe's decision to disobey her prior order to reinstate the dismissed councillors. Infuriated by the letter, Crowe responded by verbally abusing his accusers.

Crowe was eventually temporarily recalled from the position of governor in October 1709, leaving Barbados on 15 May 1710. After arriving in England, he was ordered to defend his actions as governor before the Privy Council of Great Britain. His arrival coincided with the reconstruction of the Harley ministry, which led Crowe to be permanently removed as governor. In November, his case was heard by the Privy Council, which concluded the complaints against Crowe were "frivolous"; bolstered by three petitions from Barbados in Crowe's favour, the council dismissed them.

After the Privy Council hearing, Crowe "virtually... retired from public life" and began associating with a group of individuals which included Anglo-Irish clergyman and satirist Jonathan Swift. According to an English army officer and author Henry Manners Chichester, Crowe appeared to have been on "terms of intimacy" with Swift, whose letters published in London from 1710 to 1712 make numerous references to him. On 15 December 1719, Crowe died in England; his will was proved by his widow, who was living in Barbados at the time of his death.

== Personal life, family and legacy ==
Lord Fairfax of Cameron, with whom Crowe cultivated a close relationship

As noted by Chichester, Crowe's political career was heavily influenced by his brother Christopher's marriage to Lady Charlotte Lee, the daughter of Edward Lee, 1st Earl of Lichfield. He also cultivated a close relationship with Thomas Fairfax, 5th Lord Fairfax of Cameron, who appointed Crowe as one of the trustees for a license he had been granted by Queen Anne in 1704, which gave the lord an exclusive right to salvage all shipwrecks in the West Indies for three years.

On 15 December 1698, Crowe married Lady Urania Chamberlain, the widow of Sir Willoughby Chamberlain, a plantation owner in Barbados. Together, the couple went on to have three sons, George, Mitford, and William. All three were baptised in the parish church of St Nicholas Acons in London between 1699 and 1703; George was baptised on 5 October 1699, Mitford was baptised on 12 December 1700 and William was baptised on 23 January 1702.

During his career in Spain and Barbados, Crowe was described as holding the rank of colonel, although Davies noted that it remains historically unclear which military he was part of, as there is no record of Crowe being commissioned in the English Army. Davies suggested he might have been a member of the Barbados militia or the army of the Holy Roman Empire.

According to historian Chris Taylor, Crowe also adopted new tactics in dealings with the Caribs which marked a noticeable shift from previous English colonial policies towards indigenous Caribbeans. In 1707, Crowe persuaded seven Carib chiefs from St. Vincent to sign a treaty with the Crown through gift-giving, which Taylor claims was unlike previous colonial administrations in the West Indies, who had sought to impose their will on indigenous peoples by force.

Parliament of England
Preceded by Roger Mompesson; John Smith	Member of Parliament for Southampton; February 1701 – July 1702; With: Roger Mompesson; Adam de Cardonnel	Succeeded by Frederick Tylney; Adam de Cardonnel
Legal offices
Preceded by Sir Bevil Granville	Governor of Barbados; 1707 – 1710	Succeeded by George Lillington
