= James Praed =

James Praed may refer to:

- James Praed (died 1706) (1655–1706), English politician
- James Praed (died 1687), English politician
- James Backwell Praed (1779–1837), English politician
