= Richard Whithed =

Richard Whithed or Richard Whitehead may refer to:

- Richard Whitehead (Hampshire MP) (1594–c. 1663), aka Richard Whithed, soldier in Parliamentary army in the English Civil War, MP between 1628 and 1653
- Richard Whithed (Stockbridge MP) (died 1693), English politician, MP for Stockbridge 1689–93

== See also ==
- Whithed (disambiguation)
