= Culliford =

Culliford is an English surname. Notable people with the surname include:

- James Culliford (1927–2002), British actor
- Nine Culliford (1930–2016), Belgian colourist of comic strips
- Robert Culliford (17th century), English pirate
- Robert Culliford (MP) (1617–1698), English landowner and politician
- Pierre Culliford (1928–1992), better known as Peyo, Belgian creator of the Smurfs
- William Culliford (died 1724), English politician

== See also ==
- Culliford Tree Hundred
