= John Borlase (1667–1754) =

English politician

John Borlase (1667 – April 1754) was an English politician. He sat as MP for St. Ives from 1705 till 1710.

He was baptised on 24 March 1667. He was the first son of John Borlase (died c. 1694) and Mary, the daughter of Richard Keigwin. He was educated at Exeter College, Oxford and matriculated in 1685. He entered the Middle Temple in 1685. On 17 March 1690, he married Lydia (died 1725), the daughter of Christopher Harris and they had nine sons (four predeceased him) and 4 daughters.

Parliament of England
Preceded by James Praed; John Pitt	Member of Parliament for St Ives; 1705–1707; With: Sir Bartholomew Gracedieu; John Praed	Succeeded by Parliament of Great Britain
Parliament of Great Britain
Preceded by Parliament of England	Member of Parliament for St Ives; 1707–1710; With: John Praed	Succeeded by John Praed; John Hopkins
