= Thomas Jervoise (died 1743) =

English politician (1667–1743)

Thomas Jervoise (6 September 1667 – 10 May 1743) was an English (later British) politician.

Jervoise was the oldest son of Thomas Jervoise MP and his wife Mary, daughter of George Purefoy. He matriculated at New Inn Hall, Oxford in 1683, aged 15.

Described as a "godly squire", Jervoise was a member of the Society for Promoting Christian Knowledge (SPCK) and the Society for the Propagation of the Gospel in Foreign Parts (SPG), and was credited as a founder of the latter.

Standing for Parliament at Lymington in 1690, Jervoise was defeated, and his petition to Parliament to investigate the election returns was rejected. However, he was elected for Stockbridge in a by-election in 1691. Jervoise did not sit in the Parliament of 1695–1698. In 1697 he was Captain of a Troop of Hampshire Militia Horse. He was elected MP for Hampshire in 1698, January 1701 and November 1701.

In 1702, Jervoise contested both Hindon and Plympton Erle. Although he was elected at Plympton Erle (he was unseated on petition on 28 January 1703), he chose to contest the result at Hindon, bringing a charge of bribery against one of the successful candidates, George Morley. Morley's election was declared void, and in a by-election in November 1704, Jervoise defeated Morley.

Elected MP for Hampshire again in 1705, in 1708 Jervoise stood aside for the Earl of Portland's son Viscount Woodstock. Woodstock succeeded to the earldom in 1709, and Jervoise retook the seat at the ensuing by-election. He was defeated in 1710.

He married in 1691 Elizabeth, daughter of Sir Gilbert Clarke, with whom he had a son. Secondly, in 1700 he married Elizabeth, daughter and heir of Sir John Stonhouse, 5th baronet of Amberden Hall, Widdington, Essex; they had a son and a daughter.

The costs of repeated contests for parliamentary seats obliged him to sell the Wiltshire manor of Stratford Tony, but he retained the estates of Northfield and Weoley Park in Worcestershire, Britford in Wiltshire, and Herriard in Hampshire as well as estates in Essex obtained through his second marriage.

Parliament of England
Preceded by Richard Whithed; William Montagu	Member of Parliament for Stockbridge; 1691–1695; With: Richard Whithed 1691–1693; Anthony Rowe Nov.–Dec. 1693; George Pitt 1694–1695	Succeeded by Anthony Sturt; John Venables
Preceded by Earl of Wiltshire; Richard Norton	Member of Parliament for Hampshire; 1698–1702; With: Richard Norton 1698–1701; Richard Chaundler 1701–1702	Succeeded by Richard Norton; George Pitt
Preceded by Richard Hele; Courtenay Croker	Member of Parliament for Plympton Erle; 1702–1703; With: Richard Edgcumbe	Succeeded by Richard Edgcumbe; Richard Hele
Preceded by Sir James Howe; George Morley	Member of Parliament for Hindon; 1704–1705; With: Sir James Howe	Succeeded by George Morley; Reynolds Calthorpe
Preceded by Richard Norton; George Pitt	Member of Parliament for Hampshire; 1705–1707; With: Richard Chaundler	Succeeded by themselves
Parliament of Great Britain
Preceded by themselves	Member of Parliament for Hampshire; 1707–1708; With: Richard Chaundler	Succeeded by Marquess of Winchester; Viscount Woodstock
Preceded by Marquess of Winchester; Viscount Woodstock	Member of Parliament for Hampshire; 1709–1710; With: Marquess of Winchester	Succeeded by George Pitt; Sir Simeon Stuart, Bt
