= Charles Wyndham (1638–1706) =

English politician

Sir Charles Wyndham (1638 – 1706) was an English politician who served as a Whig Member of Parliament from 1679 to 1701.

== Family ==
Wyndham's birthdate is unrecorded, but he was baptised 2 April 1638. He was the fourth but second surviving son of Sir Edmund Wyndham (c. 1600–1681), and Christabella, daughter of Hugh Pyne of Cathanger, Fivehead, Somerset. Christabella was the wet nurse for the future King Charles II and considered one of the most beautiful women of her day.

The Wyndhams were an ancient and honourable family, with roots in Norfolk and Somerset going back more than two centuries. in the House of Commons. Sir Edmund served as an MP for Minehead and Bridgwater as did his brother Sir Francis Wyndham, 1st Baronet. Charles' oldest brother, Sir Hugh Wyndham (1624–1671). and younger brother Thomas Wyndham, were also MPs.

Sir Edmund was a royalist who supported Kings Charles I and Charles II. Sir Francis, a colonel, helped Charles II escape after his defeat at Dunster Castle.

The family went abroad after the end of the English Civil War, and Wyndham served as a Page of Honour to the exiled Charles II until 1660.

== Career ==
Wyndham continued his career at court after the Restoration. He served as sewer of the queen's chamber to King Charles' consort, Queen Catherine, until 1669, then served as Gentleman Usher of the Privy Chamber from 1687–1694.

In 1661, he became a Cornet in the Royal Horse Guards (The Blues). Wyndham was knighted 15 September 1662. He became a lieutenant in 1667, followed by captain from 1685–1689.

Wyndham served as MP for Southampton from 1679–1689 and 1689–1698, and St Ives from 1698–1701.

Wyndham was a very popular MP in Southampton, where he earned a reputation as "a zealous assertor of the tenants’ rights" against their landlord. His coat of arms has been placed on a shield on the city Bargate.

== Personal life ==
On 19 June 1665, he married Jamesina Young, the daughter of James Young of Winchester. Through her uncle John Young, the Dean of Winchester, Wyndham inherited Cranbury Park, Hursley, where Sir Isaac Newton lived toward the end of his life.

Wyndham died 22 July 1706, without male issue, and was buried at Hursley Church. His wife died on 31 May 1720 and was interred next to her husband at the church.

Parliament of England
Preceded by Thomas Knollys	Member of Parliament for Southampton; October 1679–March 1681; With: Benjamin Newland	Succeeded by Richard Brett
Parliament of England
Preceded by Edward Fleming	Member of Parliament for Southampton; 1685–1687; With: Benjamin Newland	Succeeded by John Smith
Parliament of England
Preceded by Richard Brett	Member of Parliament for Southampton; 31 Dec. 1689–1698; With: Benjamin Newland	Succeeded by John Smith II
Parliament of England
Preceded by John Michell	Member of Parliament for St Ives; 1698–1701; With: James Praed	Succeeded by Benjamin Overton
