= Encombe House =

Grade II* listed building in Dorset, England

Coordinates: 50.6068°N 2.0796°W

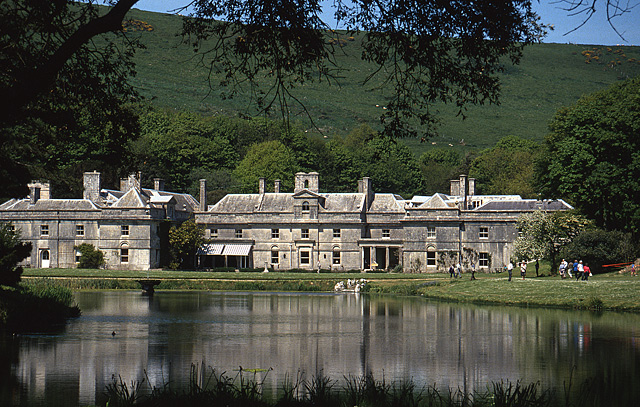
Encombe House

Encombe House is a privately owned, Grade II* listed country house built in 1735 on the Encombe Estate near the village of Kingston and about 1-mile (1.6 km) inland of Dorset's Jurassic Coast in southern England. The parkland is Grade II* listed in the National Register of Historic Parks and Gardens.

== History ==
The estate was given in A.D. 948 to the Abbess of Shaftesbury by King Eadred and probably remained in the possession of Shaftesbury Abbey during the Middle Ages until Henry VIII dissolved the monasteries.

After Shaftesbury Abbey surrendered in 1539, the manor of Encombe was granted to John Zouche in May 1540, who is presumed to have been a kinsman of Elizabeth Zouche, the last Abbess of Shaftesbury who signed the deed of surrender. He immediately passed on the property to Sir Thomas Arundel, who was related to the Zouche family. Arundel had previously administered the estates of Shaftesbury Abbey, and as a commissioner of Thomas Cromwell in the south west, acquired much of the property of the abbey in Dorset and Wiltshire. However, he fell out of favour in the reign of Edward VI and was beheaded in 1552, forfeiting all his possessions to the crown.

Later in 1552, the estate was acquired by Robert Culliford and it remained in the Culliford family until 1734. The family only prevented Oliver Cromwell from seizing the property by providing men to help slight nearby Corfe Castle in 1645. The last member of the Culliford family to own the property, William Culliford, who had run into debt, sold the house to George Pitt of Stratfield Saye in Hampshire. The estate was inherited by his second son, John Pitt, a second cousin of William Pitt the Elder, prime minister and first Earl of Chatham. He pulled down the first house and built a new one that incorporated elements of the original building. This house then became the seat of the Earls of Eldon.

== Today ==
The present owner is a former Irish Guards officer, James Gaggero, who paid £20M for the 2,000-acre estate in 2009, the Gaggeros becoming only the sixth family to own the house in 1100 years. He made his fortune by operating the former Gibraltar Airways, later GB Airways, which was finally bought out by easyJet.
