= Roger Mompesson =

American judge

Roger Mompesson MP

Member of Parliament for Southampton
- In office 27 December 1699 – November 1701 Serving with John Smith, Mitford Crowe
- Preceded by: Benjamin Newland
- Succeeded by: Adam de Cardonnel

Judge, Vice Admiralty for Massachusetts, New Hampshire, Rhode Island and Pennsylvania
- In office April 1703 – 1704

Judge, Vice Admiralty for Connecticut, New Jersey and New York
- In office April 1703 – 1715

Chief Justice of the New York Supreme Court
- In office 1704–1715
- Preceded by: John Bridges
- Succeeded by: Lewis Morris

Chief Justice of the New Jersey Supreme Court
- In office October 1704 – April 1709
- Preceded by: Office created
- Succeeded by: Thomas Gordon
- In office August 1709 – 14 February 1710
- Preceded by: Thomas Gordon
- Succeeded by: David Jamison

Chief Justice of the Pennsylvania Supreme Court
- In office April 1706 – 1706
- Preceded by: John Guest
- Succeeded by: David Lloyd

Member of the New Jersey Provincial Council for the Eastern Division
- In office 29 November 1705 – 1715

Member of the New York Provincial Council
- In office 1705–1715

Personal details
- Born: c. 1661 Durnford, Langton Matravers, Dorset, England
- Died: 1715
- Spouse: Martha Pinhorne
- Children: Pinhorne Mompesson
- Education: Magdalen Hall, Oxford
- Profession: Lawyer

Roger Mompesson (c. 1661 – 1715) was a British politician who was a Member of Parliament for Southampton and held many judicial and legislative offices in British North America.

== Biography ==
Born around 1661, Roger Mompesson was the son of George Mompesson and Elizabeth Clavell. He was educated at Magdalen Hall, Oxford, and was a lawyer.

He was appointed Recorder of Southampton in May 1668, and was elected to Parliament in 1669. Mompesson served as MP for Southampton until the election of November 1701, when he lost his seat. He did not stand for election in 1702. In 1703 his recordership was declared void due to neglect.

Mompesson had become involved in engagements to pay some debts incurred by his father; this placed him in an embarrassing situation. In April 1703 he accepted an appointment as Judge of the Vice Admiralty for Connecticut, Massachusetts, New Hampshire, New Jersey, New York, Rhode Island and Pennsylvania. As he was appointed Chief Justice of New York in July 1704 he gave up four of the colonies, retaining New York, New Jersey and Connecticut until his death in 1715.

In October 1704 Roger Mompesson was appointed as the first chief justice of New Jersey and, with the exception of a few months during the administration of Lord Lovelace, held office until 14 February 1710. In February 1705 he was sworn of the New York Provincial Council, and on 29 November 1705 he was appointed to a seat on the New Jersey Provincial Council representing the Eastern Division; he held seats in both Councils until his death.

In April 1706 he was appointed Chief Justice of Pennsylvania, but no evidence exists that he ever entered upon his duties there.
