= Ascapart =

Legendary giant from English folklore

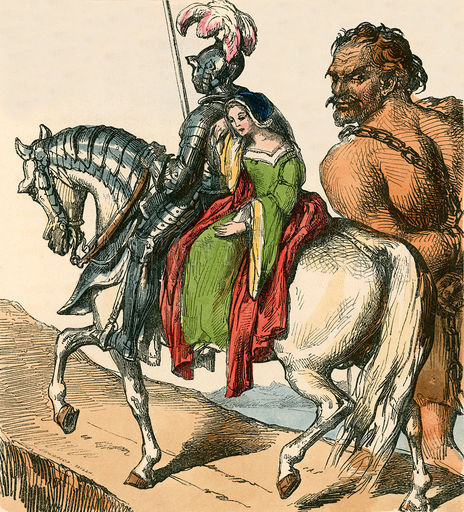
Sir Bevis and Josyan leading Ascapart.

In English folklore, Ascapart (also spelled Ascupart, Ascapard, Ascopard, Ascopart and Asgapard) was a legendary giant supposedly conquered by Bevis of Hampton, so huge as to carry Bevis, his wife, and horse under his arm. He was 30 feet tall but the smallest of his land, and was defeated after his club (made from a whole tree) was swung at Sir Bevis and became stuck in soft ground. Rather than slaying the giant however, Sir Bevis decided to make him his Squire. Later Ascapart betrayed Bevis and took his wife Josiane, and was subsequently killed by Bevis' friends.

The giant also appears in the local folklore of Hampshire and the New Forest; large medieval paintings of Sir Bevis and Ascupart can be found in the Southampton Bargate Monument Gallery.

== Legend ==
Ascapart was a legendary giant from English folklore, supposedly conquered by Bevis of Hampton, though so huge as to carry Bevis, his wife, and horse under his arm. He was 30 ft. tall, but the smallest of his land. Ascapart was defeated after his club (made from a whole tree) was swung at Sir Bevis and became stuck in soft ground. Rather than slaying the giant however, Sir Bevis decided to make him his Squire. Later Ascapart betrayed Bevis and took his wife Josiane, who was imprisoned with Ascapart as her jailer. For this Ascapart was killed by Bevis' friends when they freed Josiane. Ascapart was supposedly buried under Bevis Mount, or his body became a part of the South Downs when he fell.

The name Ascapardes may refer to "A desert people of the near east" according to the Middle English Dictionary. David Foster Wallace coined the adjective ascapartic in his novel Infinite Jest, in reference to this giant.

Alongside the story of Bevis of Hampton, the giant appears in the local folklore of Hampshire and the New Forest; large medieval painted oak panels of Sir Bevis and Ascupart can be found in the Southampton Bargate Monument Gallery (apparently 17th century restorations of early 14th century originals).

A large sculpture of Ascupard by Mark Antony Haden Ford, the Giant’s Head, is in Queen Elizabeth Country Park.
