= Whithed =

Whithed may refer to:

- Henry Whithed, English soldier and politician
- Richard Whitehead (Hampshire MP) (1594–c. 1663), a.k.a. Richard Whithed, soldier in Parliamentary army in the English Civil War, MP between 1628 and 1653
- Richard Whithed (Stockbridge MP), English politician, MP for Stockbridge 1689–93
