= Mary Pitt =

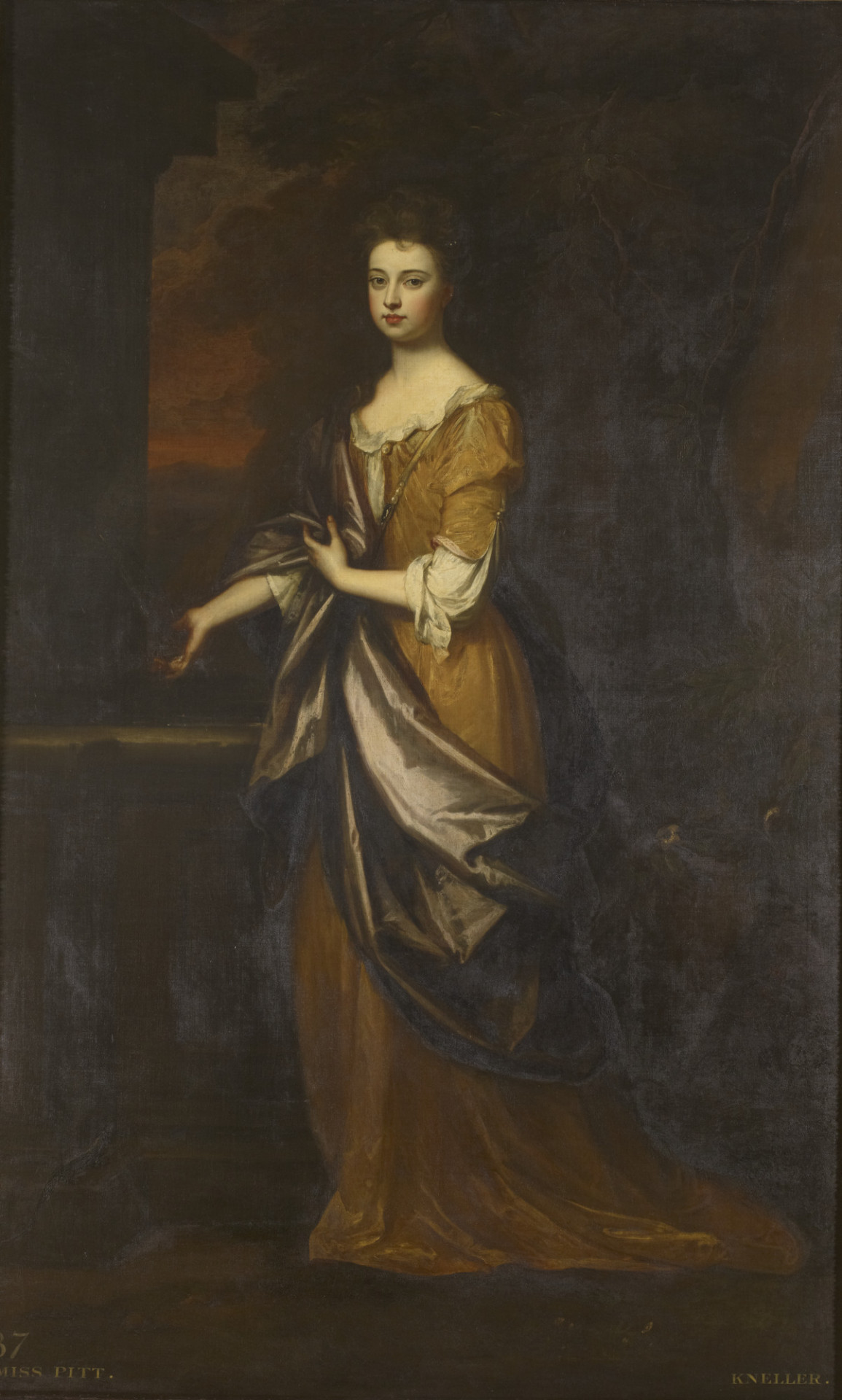

Mary Pitt (née Scrope; born 1676 - date of death unknown) was a British courtier.

Her portrait is one of the Hampton Court Beauties by Godfrey Kneller, commissioned by Queen Mary II of England in 1691. It is held in The Royal Collection. It was said that Mary Pitt was the most beautiful lady in the court, and according to Horace Walpole, the Countess of Dorchestor had advised Queen Mary II against having the most beautiful of her court painted, reasoning that "Madam, if the King were to ask for the portraits of all the wits in his court, would not the rest think he called them fools?"

== Family ==
She married John Pitt of Crow's Hall, Debenham, Suffolk, in about 1695.
