= Pact of Genoa =

Mitford Crowe, who signed the pact for England

The Pact of Genoa was a military and political alliance formed in 1705 between the Kingdom of England and Habsburg supporting landowners (known as Vigatans) on behalf of the Principality of Catalonia within the framework set by the War of Spanish Succession. According to the terms of agreement, England stationed troops in Catalonia, which, united with the Catalonian forces, fought in favour of Charles VI of the Holy Roman Empire for the candidacy of the Spanish throne against the armies of Philip V of Spain, compromising the maintenance of Catalonian laws and institutions.

== Background ==
After the Landing at Barcelona in May 1704 failed to capture the city, the viceroy of Catalonia the Castilian nobleman Francisco Antonio Fernández de Velasco y Tovar began repressing pro-Hapsburg sentiment. Among Josep Duran's documents—which had been part of a link connecting Prince George of Hesse-Darmstadt to the landing—was the Conference of the Three Commons, "the office where the preceding conspiracy formed" and showed the Catalonian military as "the most dominant and powerful part" of it. Velasco proceeded to jail many suspects, many of whom were members of the Conference, among whom they found one of the Catalan Austracist leaders, Narcís Feliu de la Penya, the boss of Vigatan Jaume Puig de Perafita and the main families of Catalan nobility. This caused many undecided people to favour Charles VI, thus also increasing membership for the "Austracist party", against the behest of the viceroy. He could not detain a portion of the conspirators, as they had embarked from Darmstadt on course to Lisbon—participating in the Capture of Gibraltar—where they reunited with the Charles VI. Velasco also ordered the requisition of stamps, effigies, paintings, and images of Jorge de Darmstadt. The repressive spiral continued in the following year, when judges of the Real Audience of Catalonia, members of the Council of the Hundred, and bishop Benito de Sala y de Caramany were arrested. Finally, Velasco ordered the suppression of the Conference of the Commons.

== Negotiations ==
In March 1705, during the War of the Spanish Succession, Queen Anne named Mitford Crowe as one of her committee members. Crowe, a liquor merchant loyal to the Principality of Catalonia, was chosen "to form an alliance between us and the mentioned Principality or whichever other Spanish province". He was given instructions to negotiate with Catalan representatives "having been informed of the Catalonian people's inclination to liberate themselves from France's imposed yoke and to remove the Duke of Anjou's power to return to the House of the Habsburgs." Crowe had informed the anti-Borbon Grand Alliance, which included England, that "the Catalans were an independent people that lived under their own laws and privileges that would want to support a king that committed to restoring their ancient rights".

However, Crowe couldn't interview any Catalan representatives due to viceroy Velasco's continuing with his repressive campaign against Austracist Catalans, regardless of their involvement in the failed conspiracy from 1704. In response to this, Crowe put himself into contact with the Vigatans, who agreed to an Anglo-Catalan alliance in the name of the Principality. This group of landowners and nobles from the Plain of Vic was the first Austracist group in Catalonia to take up arms against Philip V. In the spring of 1705, they had seized Plain of Vic while a second Austracist group from the Camp de Tarragona was handled by the Nebot family from Riudoms.

== Signing ==
Crowe's initiative gave a location for the Vigatans to meet at on 17 May 1705 at Saint Sebastian's chapel in the parish church of Santa Eulàlia de Riuprimer, where they agreed to grant complete power to the young nobleman Antoni de Peguera i d'Aimeric and the lawyer Domènec Perera, signing the treaty with England in the name of Catalonia. The document says the following concerning powers:

"Powers and commission of eight subjects of the Plain of Vich on the 17th of May, 1705 give to Don Antoni de Peguera and Dr. Domènec Perera to treat with Mitford Crowe, sent from the Queen of England in Genoa, or with whoever else that has the power. We, the undersigned, give and grant broad power and authority to the noble Don Antoni de Peguera and Dr. Domènec Perera so that in our name they sign, promise, and secure under our word of honor, our persons, and our well-beings, the treaties or treaty that according to his powers the illustrious Mr. Mitford Crowe, sent by Her Majesty the Queen of England in Genoa, has the power and authority to sign, promise, and secure through the motives, causes, and reasons that, according to our consent and approval, the aforementioned gentlemen of given word have whole faith and credit to the two together or to only one that finds himself in Genoa or wherever else where he finds the aforementioned illustrious Mr. Mitford Crowe, or any other minister from the Majesty of the Kingdom of England. That which we sign and promise in good faith being by the spoken effect together in the parish church of Santa Eulalia of the bishop and veguer of the city of Vic, on the 17th of May, 1705.

The pact was signed in Genoa on 20 June 1705 by De Peguera and Perera, in the name of the Principality of Catalonia, and by Crowe, as commissioner of the Kingdom of England.

== The treaty ==
The agreement, adjusted in Genoa on 20 June 1705 by Mitford Crowe (in the name of Queen Anne) and Antoni de Peguera and Domènec Perera included the following terms:

- England will dedicate itself to board 8,000 infantry soldiers and 2,000 cavalry soldiers from the powers of the Grand Alliance on the Spanish coast. Likewise, England will deliver 12,000 rifles with the correct ammunition to arm the Catalan forces.
- Catalonia will arm 6,000 men, subsidized by England, that should be united with allied forced, who shall provide accommodations and provisions on their own coast.
- Catalonia recognizes Charles VI as the legitimate King of Spain.
- The new king should swear by and maintain the laws of Catalonia.
- The treaty should be maintained in secret until the capture of Barcelona.

The text upholds the Catalan-Austracist ideology that is based on the diplomatic and "constitutionalist" model and of the relations between the sovereign and its subjects, that put the loyalty of the country before loyalty to the king in the event that the king were to violate the established laws. The treaty alludes to the Catalan Constitutions 17 times to contrast against Philip V's viceroys.
