= Bargate =

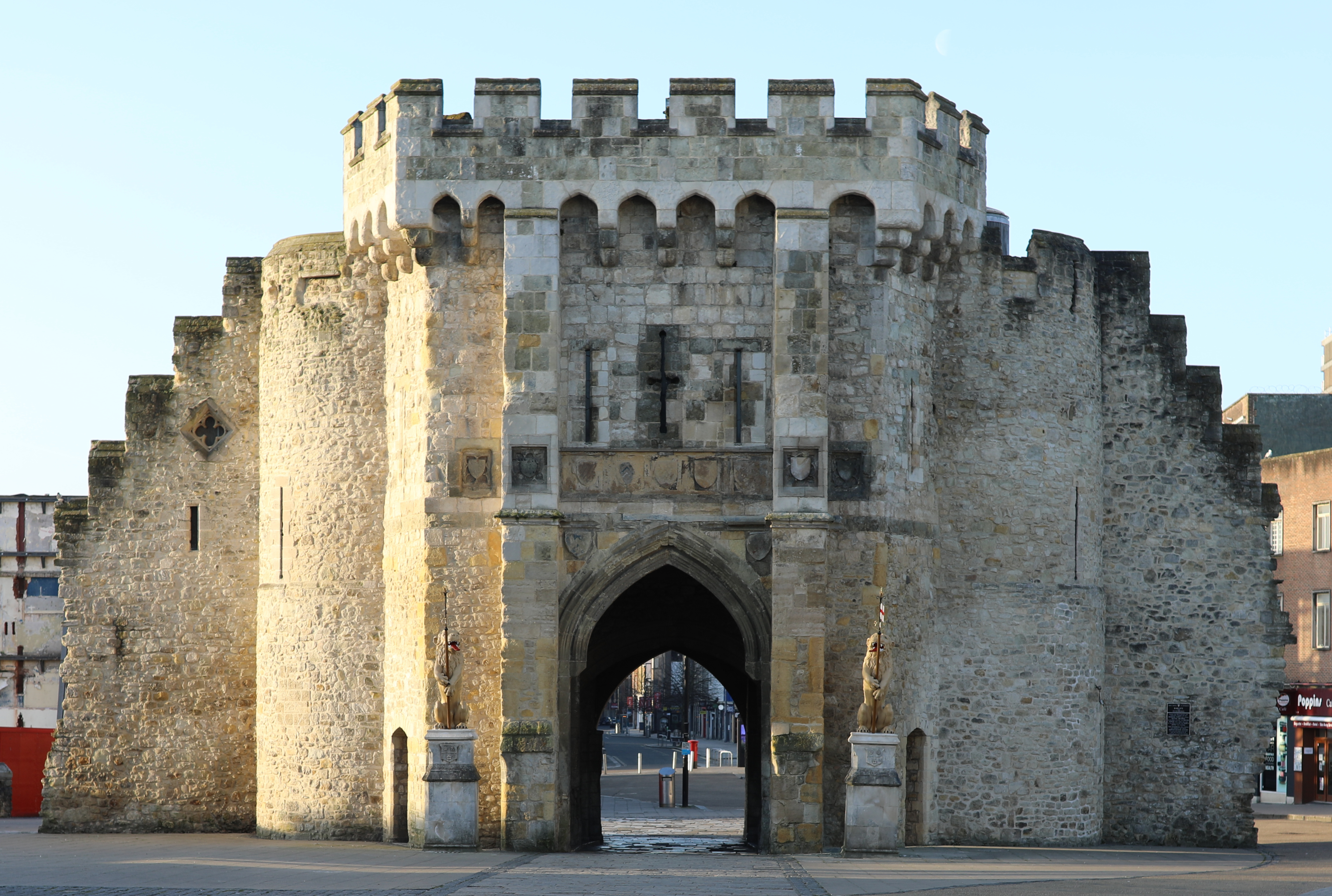

- Location within Southampton
- 50°54′10″N 1°24′15″W
- Type: Gatehouse
- Location: Southampton City Centre
- OS grid reference: SU 41997 11636

History
- Built: c 1180

Site notes
- Architectural style: Medieval
- Owner: Southampton City Council

Listed Building – Grade I
- Official name: Bar Gate and Guildhall
- Designated: 14 July 1953
- Reference no.: 1092087

The Bargate is a Grade I listed medieval gatehouse in the city centre of Southampton, England. Constructed in Norman times as part of the Southampton town walls, it was the main gateway to the city. The building is a scheduled monument.

== History ==
The Bargate was built c. 1180, constructed of stone and flint. Alterations were made to the building around 1290, when large drum towers were added to the north side, with arrow slit windows.

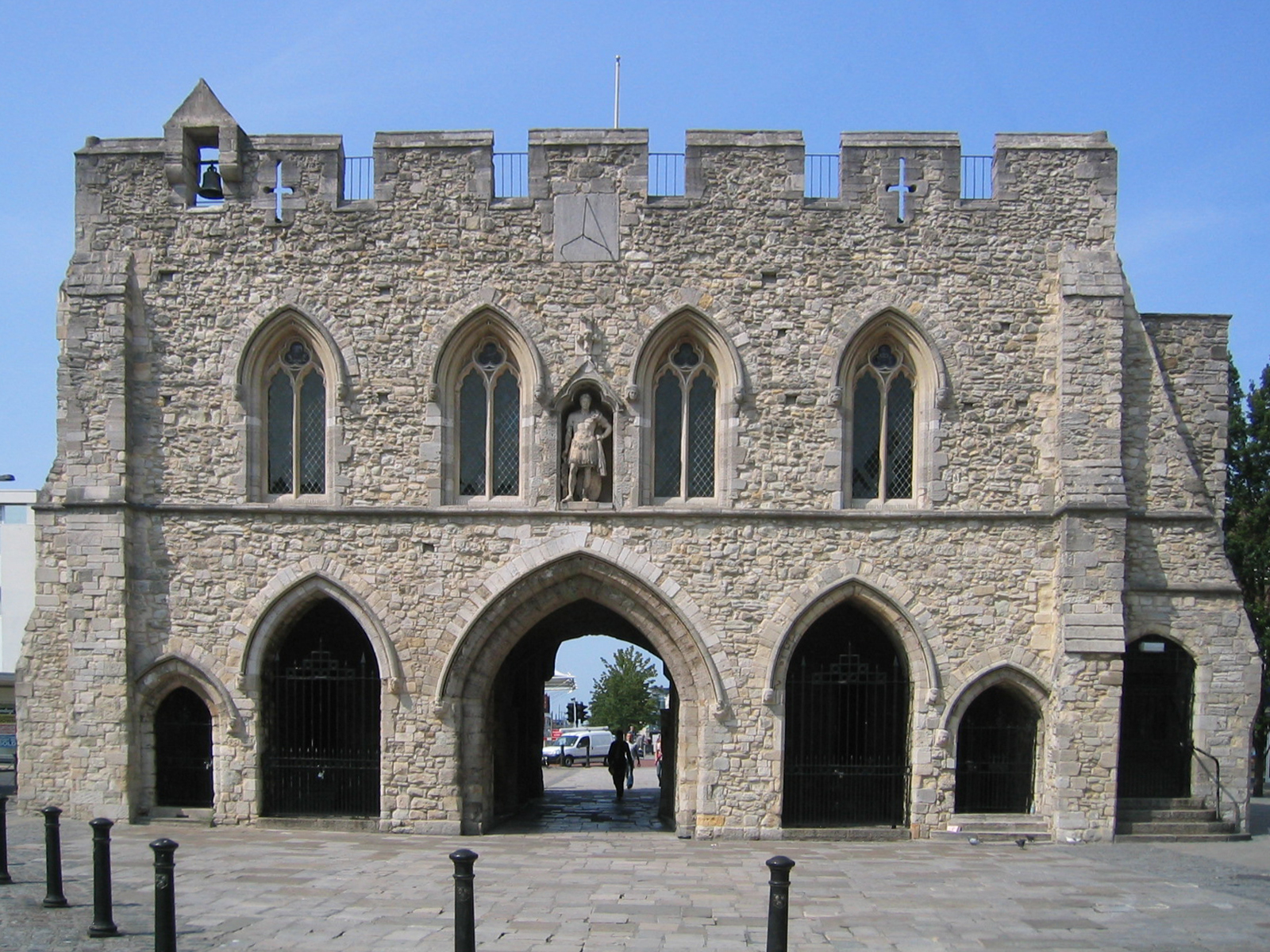
The Bargate from the south

A two-storey extension was made to the south side towards the end of the 13th century, with four windows lighting the upstairs room. Work was also carried out to the interior of the upper room during the 13th century, when the stone fireplaces were installed. The embattled north front was added to the building around 1400. A survey of the town's guns in 1468 reported that the Bargate held two breach loader guns and a brass muzzle loader. It is not clear when the Bargate started being used as a prison but the first records of it date from 1439. In 1458 the prison was used to detain the Genoese population of the town as part of the response to a Genoese attack on an English trading expedition. The area outside Bargate was an execution site during the Later Middle Ages; notably, two of the men convicted of plotting against Henry V in 1415 were beheaded there.

At some point in the 16th century, the court leet of Southampton started to meet in the Bargate, although it continued to switch between the Bargate and Cutthorn mound on Southampton Common until 1670. Also around the 16th century it is thought that wooden sculptures of lions were added in front of the Bargate. The surviving mayors accounts for 1594 include payments for the construction of new lions and the use of the word new suggests that lion sculptures existed before that point. The accounts also mention a pair of paintings featuring Bevis of Hampton and Ascapart on wooden panels. These appear to have been placed on the northern side of the building as they are mentioned as being present by a visitor in 1635.

A bell was added to the southwest corner of the building by 1579. The current bell is inscribed "1605" and was used as the city's curfew and alarm bell. In 1644 the panels featuring Bevis of Hampton and Ascapart were repainted.

The room above the gate itself was probably added shortly after 1400 and the town steward books mention a banquet held there in 1434. It was originally used as the city's guildhall, until the 1770s. It was at this point that the city began to grow to the north of the gate. Also during the 18th century, five panels containing painted shields and the sundial were added to the building and in the middle of the century the old wooden lions were replaced with new lead sculptures.

Additional archways were added in 1764 and 1774. In 1765, a passage was cut through the eastern side of the arch for pedestrians. A further passage through the western side was added later. The construction of these passages ended (for a time) the Bargate's use as a prison.

From 2006-2012 the building was leased by ‘a space arts’ who fitted-out the first floor to create the Bargate Monument Gallery. The internal partitioning from this period was removed in 2022.

=== 19th century ===
In 1809 a statue of George III in Roman dress was added the middle of the four windows of the southern side. It replaced a wooden statue of Queen Anne. The statue was a gift to the town from John Petty, 2nd Marquess of Lansdowne and is made from Coade stone.

Following the establishment of Southampton's police force in February 1836, the upper room was used as a prison The current guildhall within the Bargate was constructed in 1852 and was designed to be used as a criminal court. In addition to this the Bargate continued to be the site of meetings of Southampton's court leet until 1856. In 1881 the panels featuring Bevis of Hampton and Ascapart were moved into the building for protection.

=== 20th century ===
By 1899, the increase in road traffic and the introduction of trams led to proposals for the Bargate's demolition. It was reprieved at a subsequent council meeting but the issue arose again in 1914 and 1923. The Bargate was however eventually separated from the adjoining town walls in the 1930s using a scheme previously suggested in 1900. The first separation was made on the east side in 1932 with the second on the west carried out in 1937. Around this time Portland cement was used in works on the Bargate. This was later to cause problems as it trapped water within the structure damaging the stones. The Bargate ceased to be used as a court in 1933 with the court functions moving to the law courts in the new Southampton Civic Centre. The monument again served as the police headquarters for the city during the Second World War. In 1951 a museum of local history was opened in the Bargate as part of celebrations to mark the Festival of Britain. Among its collection the museum included the painted panels of Bevis of Hampton and Ascapart. The museum later closed.

=== 21st century ===
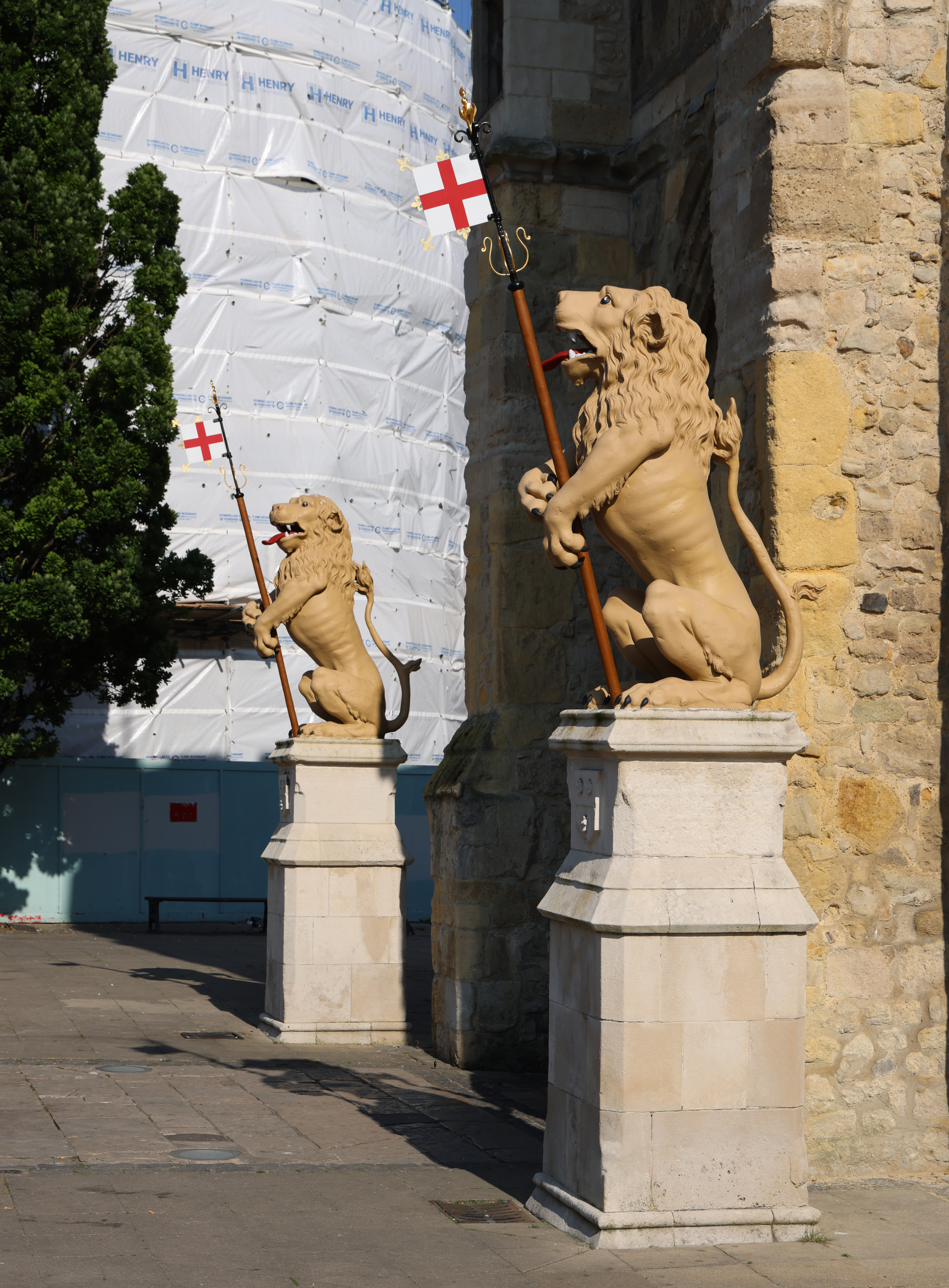
The bargate lions post repainting

Between 2006 and 2012, following refurbishment funded by the South East England Development Agency, the upper room served as The Bargate Monument Gallery, during which time 42 exhibitions featuring the work of over 250 artists were staged here.

In 2016 the Portland cement mortar that had been used on the structure in the 1930s was removed and replaced with lime mortar. At the same time the parapet was waterproofed to prevent further water entering the structure. In September 2018 corrosion on the lion sculptures caused the tail on one of them to fall off. In November 2020 the lion sculptures were removed to allow them to be repaired. As part of this the previous internal structure was removed and replaced with a stainless steel version. They were subsequently returned to public display in March 2021 having repainted in what is believed to be their original colours.

== Heraldic shields ==
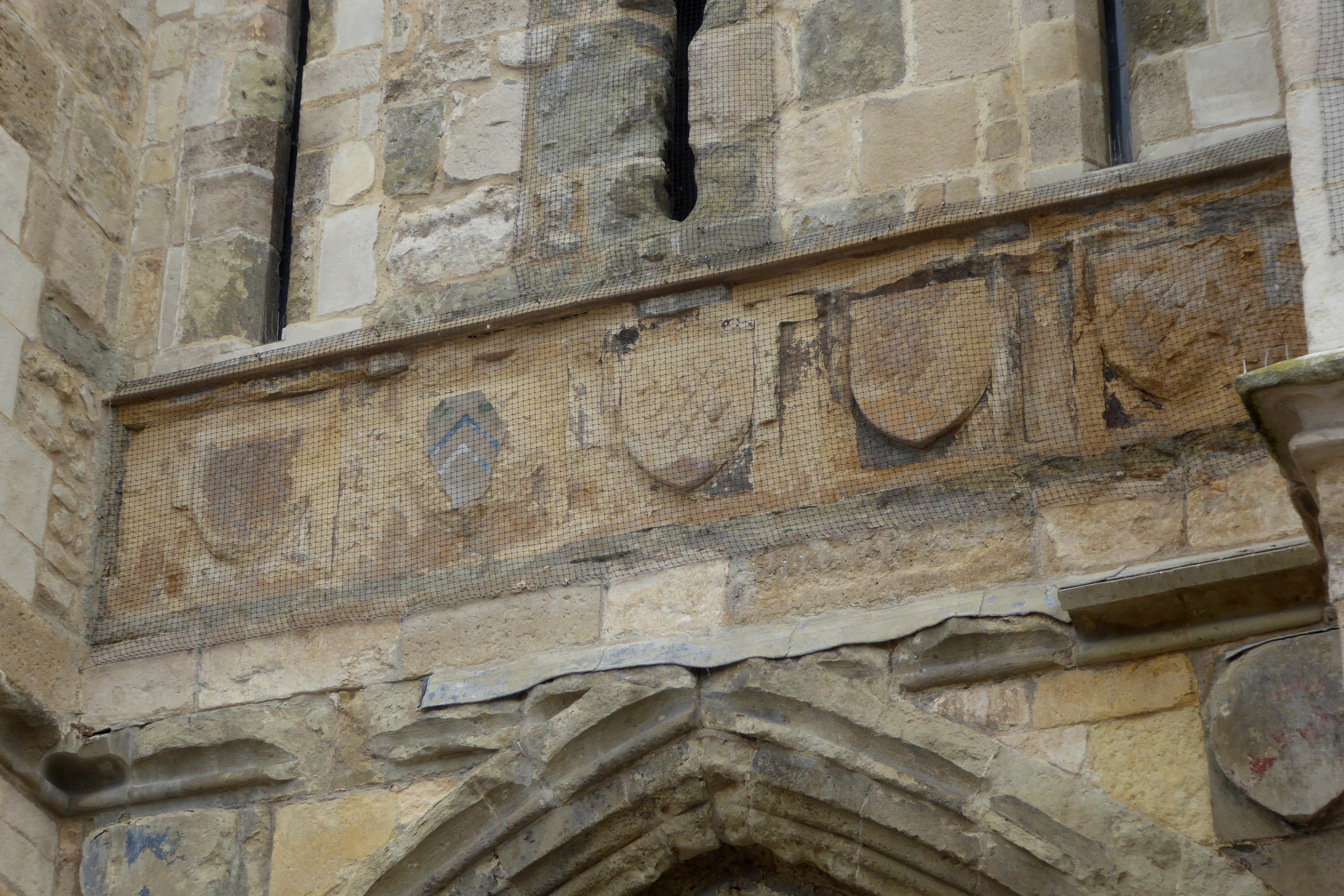
Heraldic shields on the north of the Bargate

There are eleven heraldic shields on the north side of the Bargate. Aside from the crosses of Saints George and Andrew, they are the coats of arms of leading families of the town from the end of the 17th century and early 18th. The shields have repeatedly suffered from decay, due to damp. The original shields largely decayed away by the early 19th century. They were replaced by shields made from Caen stone. These shields were in turn damaged by damp and were heavily decayed by the start of the 20th century, at which point they were patched with mortar held together by iron. These repairs again failed, and work was again carried out in the 1990s, but these repairs again decayed. Another attempt to repair the shields is planned in the aftermath of the 2016 mortar replacement.

| Arms | Inspired by | Image |
|---|---|---|
| Cross of Saint George | Saint George | |
| St. Andrew's Cross | Andrew the Apostle | |
| Paulet | Charles Paulet, 1st Duke of Bolton & Charles Paulet, 2nd Duke of Bolton | |
| Tylney | Frederick Tylney | |
| Cardonnel | Adam de Cardonnel | |
| Noel | Sir Gerard Noel, 2nd Baronet & Charles Noel, 1st Earl of Gainsborough | |
| Fleming | Richard Fleming | |
| Leighs of Testwood? | Leighs of Testwood family? | |
| Mill | John Mill | |
| Wyndham | Charles Wyndham | |
| Newland | Benjamin Newland | |

== Historical images ==
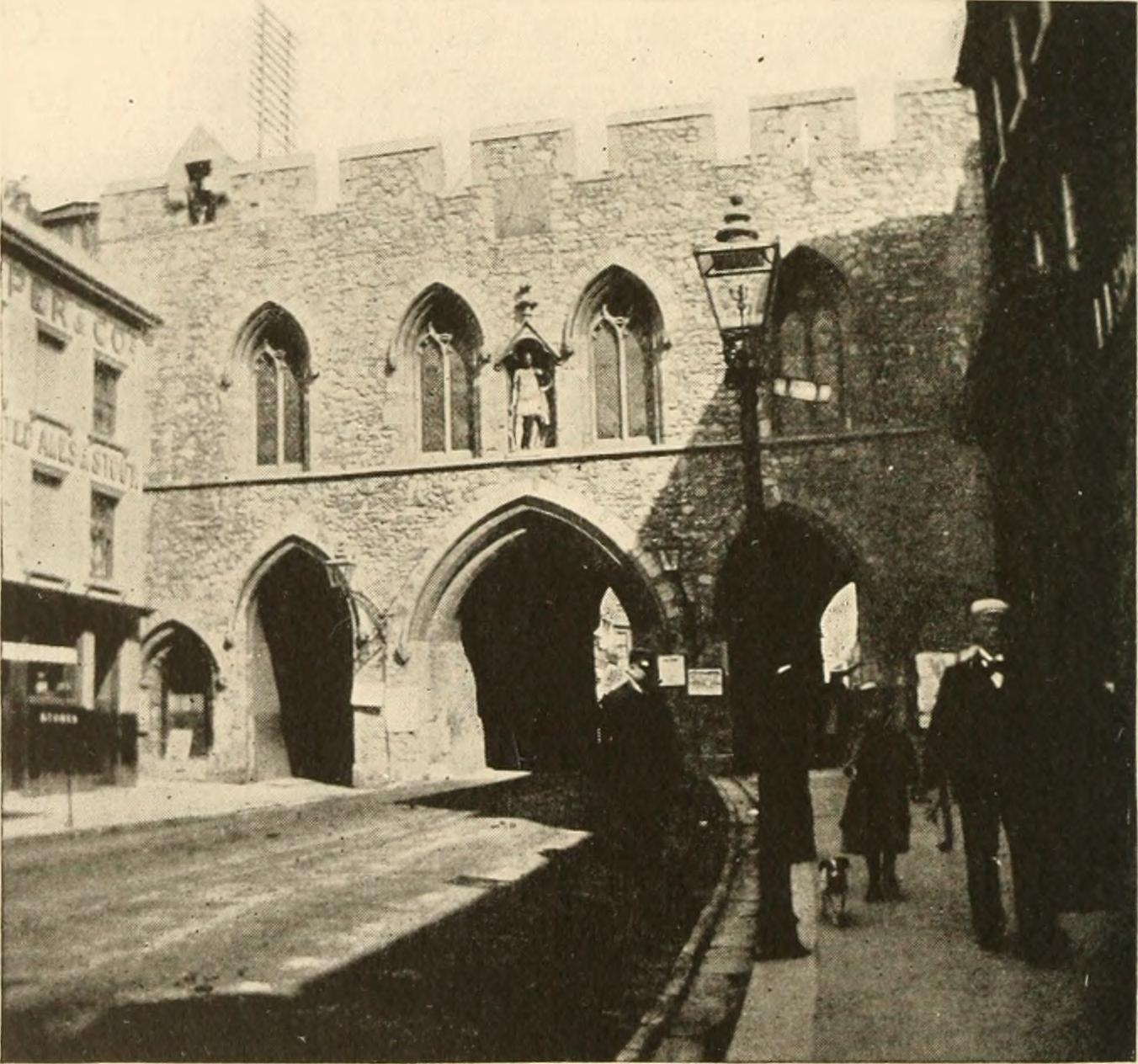
The Bargate from the south in 1917

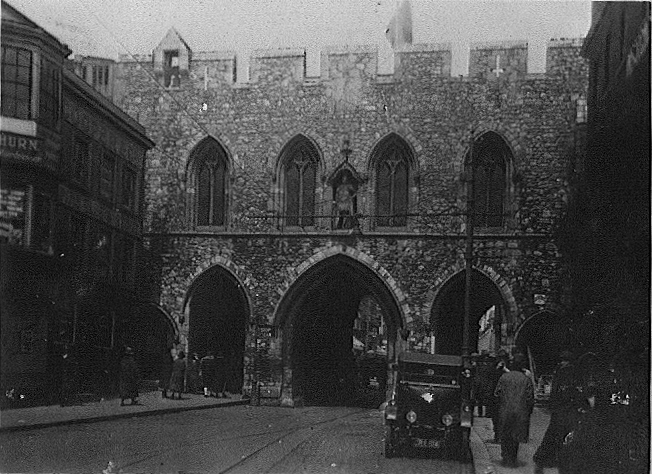
The Bargate from the south c. 1930, flanked by buildings and with tram lines running through the arch
