= George Pitt (died 1694) =

English landowner and politician

George Pitt JP

Member of Parliament for Wareham
- In office 1660–1679 Serving with Robert Culliford
- Preceded by: John Trenchard
- Succeeded by: Thomas Erle; George Savage

Personal details
- Born: 9 May 1625
- Died: 27 July 1694 (aged 69)
- Spouse: Lady Jane Sedley (after 1657)
- Relations: Sir George Morton, 1st Baronet (grandfather)
- Children: 7 (including John Pitt and George Pitt)
- Parent(s): Edward Pitt; Rachel Morton

George Pitt JP (9 May 1625 – 27 July 1694) was an English landowner and politician who sat in the House of Commons from 1660 to 1679.

== Early life ==
Pitt was the eldest surviving son of Edward Pitt of Strathfieldsaye, Hampshire and his wife Rachel Morton, daughter of Sir George Morton, 1st Baronet of Milborne St. Andrew, Dorset. He succeeded to Stratfield Saye House on the death of his father in 1643 and served briefly as a cornet in the Royalist army from 1643 to 1644. He travelled abroad from 1644 to 1646 and was a student of Middle Temple in 1652 and Inner Temple in 1654.

== Career ==
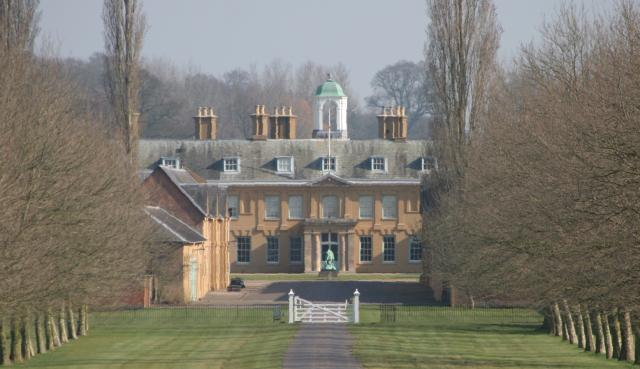
Stratfield Saye House.

In 1660, Pitt was elected Member of Parliament for Wareham in the Convention Parliament, although as a Cavalier he had not been entitled to stand; in spite of his background, he was on good terms with Presbyterian and Independent members. He was made gentleman of the privy chamber in June 1660 and Justice of the Peace (J.P.) for Hampshire and Gloucestershire in July 1660. In August 1660 he became commissioner for assessment for Dorset until 1664 and for Hampshire until 1680. He was commissioner for oyer and terminer for Middlesex in November 1660. In 1661 he was re-elected MP for Wareham in the Cavalier Parliament.

Pitt exploited the valuable china-clay deposits on his Purbeck estates, and, going further afield, acquired a colliery in county Durham. But he appears principally as a financier, or, as Lord Keeper Guilford, expressed it, a usurer. He was commissioner for assessment for Westminster from 1664 to 1669, J.P. for Westminster from 1665 to 1689, and commissioner for assessment for Gloucestershire and Wiltshire from 1673 to 1680. In 1674 for the sum of £2,500 he bought the post of comptroller to the Duke of York, which he held until 1675, and in that year became a freeman of Portsmouth. He was J.P. for Dorset from 1680 and commissioner for assessment for Gloucestershire, Hampshire and Wiltshire from 1689 to 1690.

In 1675 he formed a syndicate with Sir William Petty and Sir John Baber to farm the Irish revenues, but upon its defeat by a rival syndicate Pitt abused the lord treasurer in the King’s presence, ‘in most rude and indecent terms’, and was dismissed. He was promised the return of his investment of £2,500, but there is no evidence that he received it, unless perhaps in the form of an annuity which he claimed after the Revolution. Nor was he awarded the contract for the Irish revenue. Pitt was no longer regarded by Danby to be of the court party in Parliament, although the government still counted him amongst its supporters. The Earl of Shaftesbury marked him ‘worthy’, but in 1678 both Government and Opposition wrote him down as a member of the court party once more. His parliamentary activity began to decline before 1675, and on 13 December 1678 he was found to have departed the House without leave. Pitt was blacklisted as one of the ‘unanimous club’ of court supporters, and did not stand again for Parliament. However, the Duke of York chose him to intermediate with Shaftesbury in 1679, preferring him over another as, ‘the steadier man, and the more my friend,' but the outcome of this arrangement is obscure.

== Personal life ==
In 1657, Pitt married Lady Jane (née Savage), widow successively of George, 6th Baron Chandos of Sudeley, and Sir William Sedley, 4th Baronet of Southfleet, Kent and daughter of John Savage, 2nd Earl Rivers. They had three sons and four daughters. This marriage made Pitt absolute master of the Gloucestershire estates of the Chandos family under the will of Lady Jane's first husband, and his income was assessed at £4,000 p.a. on the Royal Oak list.

Pitt died at the age of 69.

Parliament of England
Preceded by John Trenchard	Member of Parliament for Wareham; 1660–1679; With: Robert Culliford	Succeeded by Thomas Erle; George Savage
