= John Praed =

English merchant and Tory politician

John Praed (c. 1657 – 10 October 1717), of Trevethoe, near St Ives, Cornwall, was an English merchant and Tory politician who sat in the House of Commons between 1708 and 1713.

== Early life ==
Praed was the son of James Praed of Trevethoe, Cornwall and his wife Honor Gifford, daughter of Arthur Gifford of Brightley, Devon. He was apprenticed to Mr Bonnell, a merchant in London and became a factor in Zant by 1678.

== Commercial difficulties ==
In 1680 Praed entered a business deal which was to cripple his finances for the rest of his life. Two London merchants, Daniel Gates and William Warre, sent him an order to buy up all the currants at Morea and to draw bills of exchange payable in Venice. Praed delivered the cargo, but the bills were stopped. Praed took legal action in 1690 and was awarded £6404 and costs against Warre. Warre made an unsuccessful appeal and refused to pay, whereupon Praed had him committed to the Fleet Prison and applied to sequester his estates. However Warre had managed to secure his release.

In 1693 Praed was approached by Abraham Anselm who wanted to recruit men for the exiled King James II to whom he replied that although he was a man of misfortune, yet he was a true subject of the government established. Praed petitioned unsuccessfully in the matter of Warre in 1696 and 1699. In 1706 he succeeded his brother James to the family estates at Trevethoe, which turned out to be encumbered with debt.

== Political career ==
At the 1708 British general election, Praed was elected Tory member of parliament for St Ives after a bitterly contested election. He voted against the impeachment of Sacheverell in 1710. He was returned again for St Ives at the 1710 British general election. He voted for peace in April 1711. On 10 February 1711 he tried unsuccessfully to bring in a bill to sequester Warre's estate. He did not stand at the 1713 British general election.

== Later life and legacy ==
In 1715 Praed entered an agreement with Sir Humphrey Mackworth to make Mackworth's son, William, his heir in return for £3000 and other income from the estate. In addition Praed was to recommend a wife for William Mackworth and recommended Anne Slaney who brought in a portion to pay off Praed's debts. Praed and Mackworth signed the leases with tenants at Trevethoe in 1716 and Praed was allowed to carry on living there until his death in 1717.

Praed was buried on 7 November 1717. His estates passed to William Mackworth who adopted the name William Mackworth Praed.

Parliament of Great Britain
Preceded by Sir Bartholomew Gracedieu; John Borlase	Member of Parliament for St Ives; 1708–1713; With: John Borlase 1708-1710; John Hopkins 1710-1713	Succeeded by Sir William Pendarves; John Hopkins
