= John Hopkins (died 1732) =

British merchant and Whig politician (c.1663–1732)

- Born: 1663
- Died: 1732 (aged 68–69)
- Occupation: Politician

John "Vulture" Hopkins (c. 1663 – 25 April 1732) was a British merchant of London and a Whig politician who sat in the House of Commons from 1710 to 1722.

Hopkins was a London merchant who was reputedly miserly and given to rapacious business practices. He stood unsuccessfully for St Ives at the 1708 general election but was elected as member of parliament for the borough at the 1710 general election and in 1713. At the 1715 general election he was elected MP for Ilchester. He was defeated when he stood at Great Bedwyn at the 1722 general election. He had an undistinguished career in Parliament but amassed a small fortune by speculation in the South Sea Bubble and invested it in property over several counties.

Hopkins died on 25 April 1732, aged 69, and was buried at Wimbledon. On his death, unmarried, his properties were distributed amongst the male heirs of a distant relative.

Parliament of Great Britain
Preceded by John Borlase; John Praed	Member of Parliament for St Ives; 1710–1715; With: John Praed to 1713; Sir William Pendarves 1710–13	Succeeded by Sir John Hobart; Lord Harry Powlett
Preceded by James Bateman; Edward Phelips	Member of Parliament for Ilchester; 1715–1722; With: William Bellamy	Succeeded by Daniel Moore; William Burroughs
