= John Pitt (died 1731) =

English politician

Member of the Parliament of England for Stockbridge
- In office 2 Jan. 1699 – Nov. 1701
- Preceded by: George Pitt (brother)
- Succeeded by: John Borlase

Member of the Parliament of England for St Ives
- In office 8 December 1702 – 1705
- Preceded by: Richard Chaundler
- Succeeded by: John Borlase

Personal details
- Spouse(s): Mary Pitt (1st wife); Diana Howard (2nd wife)
- Parent: George Pitt (father)
- Relatives: George Pitt (brother)

John Pitt (c. 1673–1731) was an English Tory politician who sat in the House of Commons. He was a member of the Pitt family.

Pitt was the second surviving son of George Pitt. He was educated at Balliol College, Oxford, matriculating on 16 October 1690, and the Inner Temple from 1693. In 1699 he was returned as a member of parliament for Stockbridge. He was a High Tory and likely a Jacobite, and was rumored to have kissed the hands of James II and James Francis Edward Stuart on a visit to Paris in August 1700. The Earl of Manchester reported that Pitt was "much with the Jacobites". In 1702 he was elected (on petition) to represent St Ives, likely on the interest of his father-in-law, Henry Howard, 5th Earl of Suffolk. He was an opponent of the Tack in November 1704 and did not seek re-election at the 1705 English general election. He served as High Sheriff of Suffolk in 1721.
