= John Head (Stockbridge MP) =

English politician

John Head (c. 1656–1711) was an English politician from Hampstead Norreys in Berkshire who sat in the House of Commons of England from 1685 to 1689.

Whithed was elected in 1685 as a Member of Parliament for the borough of Stockbridge in Hampshire, where his family owned property including the manor of Lickpit. He does not appear to have ever stood for election again.

His family had risen from the yeomanry to gentry, and his descendants continued to rise in status. Walter James Head changed his surname to James in 1778, was created a baronet in 1791, and in 1884 his grandson Walter James was elevated to the peerage as Baron Northbourne.

Parliament of England
Preceded by Oliver St John; Essex Strode	Member of Parliament for Stockbridge; 1685–1689; With: Essex Strode	Succeeded by Richard Whithed; Oliver St John
