= George Pitt (died 1735) =

English landowner and Tory politician

George Pitt (c. 1663–1735), of Strathfield Saye, Hampshire, was an English landowner and Tory politician who sat in the House of Commons between 1694 and 1727.

== Early life ==
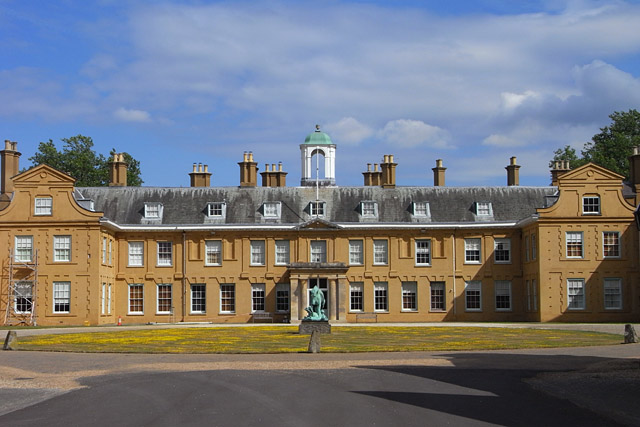
Stratfield Saye House

Pitt was the eldest son of George Pitt of Strathfield Saye and his wife Jane Savage, eldest daughter of John Savage, 2nd Earl Rivers MP. He matriculated at Wadham College, Oxford, on 26 March 1680, aged 16. He married by licence dated 14 March 1691, Lucy Lowe, widow of Laurence Lowe of Shaftesbury and daughter of Thomas Pile of Baverstock, Wiltshire. and Shroton, Dorset and the marriage led to the acquisition for his son of the reversion to the Dorset estates of Thomas Freke. He succeeded his father in 1694 and inherited landed wealth, estimated at between £10,000 and £12,000 a year, including Strathfieldsaye, the estates of Wareham Priory, with the advowsons of three of the town's churches, which gave a strong electoral influence there, and valuable collieries in north Durham, which his father had acquired in 1686.

In 1692, Pitt was involved in a tavern quarrel, in which, "o’ercome with wine and loyalty", he killed one John Hoyle of the Inner Temple, a controversial figure described by one contemporary as "an atheist, a sodomite . . . and a blasphemer". The young Pitt had been offended by his "scurrilous" references to the monarchy. Pitt fled the scene but was soon arrested, and was convicted of manslaughter later in the year. Although he obtained an almost immediate pardon, there remained the chance of a retrial as late as 1696. Pitt was slow in making his presence felt in the Commons, and avoided facing electoral contests, which may be as a consequence of this episode.

Pitt's wife died on 17 November 1697 and he made a second marriage by 1700, to Lora Grey, daughter of Audley Grey of Kingston Maurward, in Stinsford, Dorset, who brought him even more property in Dorset. For many years he was closely associated with his kinsman, Governor Thomas Pitt, who entrusted him with "paternal authority" over his children in 1706 and with the custody of the famous Pitt diamond in 1710.

== Political career ==
Pitt was returned as Member of Parliament for Stockbridge at a by-election on 23 November 1694. He canvassed at Wareham at the 1695 general election, but may not have gone to a poll. He reached an agreement with Thomas Erle, the other patron at Wareham, not to oppose each other's interest, and in 1698 he was elected MP for Wareham. He was classed as a supporter of the Country. He was returned again at Wareham in the two general elections of 1701, and was listed with the Tories by Robert Harley. On 26 February 1702 he voted for the motion vindicating the Commons’ proceedings over the impeachments of the ousted Whig ministers. In 1702 he became Freeman of Portsmouth and became Tory MP for Hampshire at the 1702 English general election, when he was also returned at Wareham. From this Parliament onwards the name 'Mr Pitt' occurs frequently in the parliamentary record, but there were by this time several members of the Pitt family in Parliament and attributions are speculative. At the 1705 English general election he avoided a contest at Hampshire and was returned at Wareham, where he replaced a Whig, Sir Edward Ernle. He voted against the Court candidate in the division on the Speaker on 25 October 1705, in favour of the Tory candidate, William Bromley, who had previously piloted through a private bill concerning his son's inheritance. He was returned again as MP for Wareham at the 1708, and voted against Dr Sacheverell's impeachment in 1710.

Pitt became a Freeman of Southampton in 1710 and at the 1710 British general election, he felt confident to stand for Hampshire again, and was returned as Tory MP at the top of the poll, keeping his seat at Wareham as insurance. On 25 November 1710, he seconded the motion nominating his friend William Bromley as Speaker. In December 1710, he moved for the appropriation of the entire yield of the land tax to the support of the navy, but the idea was rejected by the Court interest combined with the Whigs. Pitt was listed as one of the "worthy patriots" who exposed the mismanagements of the previous ministry, and was a member of the October Club. In December 1711 he did not join 'Governor' Pitt in voting with the Whigs in the crisis over the peace. He was involved in the establishment of the South Sea Company, becoming a director of the Company from 1711 to 1718 and a Commissioner for taking subscriptions to the Company in 1711. By the following April he was a leader of the March Club, being in the chair at an early meeting of the club. With the rest of the family, he opposed the French commerce bill on 18 June 1713. At the 1713 British general election he withdrew again to Wareham where he was returned. He voted on 18 March 1714 against the expulsion of Richard Steele. He was classed as a "whimsical Whig" in this Parliament.

At the 1715 British general election, Pitt was returned for Wareham and Hampshire and chose to sit for Hampshire, leaving Wareham for his son George. As a Tory, he voted against the Administration in all recorded divisions, and refused to sign the loyal association in December 1715. By 1716 he was a Commissioner for building 50 new churches. In 1722, he was returned by Robert Pitt for Old Sarum at a by-election on 30 May 1726 and did not stand again at the 1727 British general election.

== Death and legacy ==
Pitt died on 28 February 1735 and was buried at St Mary's, Stratfield Saye. He had four sons and five daughters by his second marriage. His son George inherited Stratfield Saye.

Parliament of England
| Preceded by Anthony Rowe; Thomas Jervoise | Member of Parliament for Stockbridge; 1694–1695; With: Thomas Jervoise | Succeeded by Anthony Sturt; John Venables |
| Preceded by Thomas Erle; Thomas Trenchard | Member of Parliament for Wareham; 1698–1702; With: Thomas Trenchard; Thomas Erle; Sir Edward Ernle; Thomas Erle | Succeeded by Sir Josiah Child; Thomas Erle |
| Preceded by Thomas Jervoise; Richard Chaundler | Member of Parliament for Hampshire; 1702–1705; With: Richard Norton | Succeeded by Thomas Jervoise; Richard Chaundler |
| Preceded by Thomas Erle; Sir Edward Ernle | Member of Parliament for Wareham; 1705–1707; With: Thomas Erle | Succeeded by Parliament of Great Britain |
Parliament of Great Britain
| Preceded by Parliament of England | Member of Parliament for Wareham; 1707–1710; With: Thomas Erle | Succeeded by Thomas Erle; Sir Edward Ernle |
| Preceded by Marquess of Winchester; Thomas Jervoise | Member of Parliament for Hampshire; 1710–1713; With: Sir Simeon Stuart, Bt | Succeeded by Thomas Lewis; Sir Anthony Sturt |
| Preceded by Sir Edward Ernle; Thomas Erle | Member of Parliament for Wareham; 1713–1715; With: Thomas Erle | Succeeded by George Pitt, junior Thomas Erle |
| Preceded by Thomas Lewis; Sir Anthony Sturt | Member of Parliament for Hampshire; 1715–1722; With: John Wallop 1715-1720; Lord Nassau Powlett 1720-1722 | Succeeded by Lord Harry Powlett; Lord Nassau Powlett |
| Preceded by Thomas Pitt; John Pitt | Member of Parliament for Old Sarum; 1726–1727; With: John Pitt | Succeeded by Thomas Pitt of Boconnoc; The Earl of Londonderry |
