= John Pepys =

English cricketer

John Alfred Pepys (16 April 1838 – 22 March 1924) was an English first-class cricketer active 1857–1869 who played for Kent County Cricket Club and Marylebone Cricket Club (MCC). He was born in Marylebone and died in Bexhill-on-Sea.

Pepys was educated at Eton College and Christ Church, Oxford, where he matriculated in 1856 and graduated B.A. in 1861. He became a Church of England priest and was curate of Easington, Yorkshire.

== Bibliography ==
- Carlaw, Derek (2020). Kent County Cricketers, A to Z: Part One (1806–1914) (PDF). Cardiff: ACS.
