= Robert Culliford (MP) =

English politician (1617–1698)

Robert Culliford (22 February 1617 – 1698) was an English landowner and politician who sat in the House of Commons from 1660 to 1679.

Culliford was the posthumous son of Robert Culliford of Encombe, Dorset and his wife Margaret Hyde, daughter of Robert Hyde of West Hatch, Wiltshire. He came into the estate at Encombe, on the Isle of Purbeck, at birth and farmed it. During the English Civil War his actions were mainly directed at safeguarding his property and cattle as he helped the Royalists capture Wareham in 1644 but then raised a force of 250 men in 1646 to blockade the Royalist garrison of Corfe Castle. He was thereby exempted from compounding for delinquency and from the decimation tax in 1656. However he eagerly accepted a post for one of his sons at the exiled Court "as attendant to the young gallant there".

In 1660, Culliford was elected Member of Parliament for Wareham for the Convention Parliament. He was J.P. for Dorset from July 1660 to June 1688 and commissioner for assessment for Dorset from August 1660 to 1663. In 1661 he was re-elected MP for Wareham for the Cavalier Parliament after a double return with his brother-in-law Robert Lawrence, who had been a commander of the Royalist forces at Corfe Castle. He was Deputy Lieutenant for the Isle of Purbeck from 1661 to about 1676. In 1662 he became a freeman of Lyme Regis and commissioner for corporations for Dorset until 1663. He was a J.P. for Poole in 1665 and commissioner for assessment for Dorset from 1666 to 1680. In 1675 he was commissioner for recusants. He was removed from the commission of the peace in June 1688 and during the Glorious Revolution he protected some Roman Catholic neighbours at Lulworth Castle when they were threatened by a mob. One of these neighbours said of the incident "God has been pleased to raise up a friend of almost an enemy" . He was reinstated J.P. for Dorset from November 1688 until his death and was a commissioner for assessment for Dorset from 1689 to 1690.

Culliford died at the age of 70 and was buried at Corfe Castle on 10 February 1698.

Culliford married firstly Elizabeth Lawrence, daughter of Sir Edward Lawrence of Creech Grange, Steeple, Dorset on 14 May 1638 and had six sons and five daughters. He married secondly before 10 October 1676, Jane Lawrence, widow of his brother-in-law Sir Robert Lawrence of Creech Grange and daughter of John Williams of Tyneham, Dorset. His son William was MP for Corfe Castle from 1690 to 1699.

Parliament of England
Preceded by John Trenchard	Member of Parliament for Wareham; 1660–1679; With: George Pitt	Succeeded by Thomas Erle; George Savage
