= Bartholomew Gracedieu =

English politician

Sir Bartholomew Gracedieu (died 1715) was an English politician who served as MP for St. Ives from 1705 till 1708.

He was the third son of Thomas Gracedieu. He married Francis (d. 1720) and had 2 daughters and 1 other child.

He was knighted on 17 November 1697.
