= January 1701 English general election =

General election in England

- January – February 1701

All 513 seats in the House of Commons 257 seats needed for a majority
	First party	Second party
Party	Tory	Whig
Seats won	249	219
Seat change	▲41	▼27
- Composition of the House of Commons after the election

After the downfall of the Whig Junto during the previous Parliament, King William III had appointed a largely Tory government, which was able to gain ground at the election, exploiting the decline in Whig popularity following the end of hostilities with France. During the election, the rival East India Companies attempted to secure the election of MPs sympathetic with their interests by interfering in the electoral process to some extent in at least 86 constituencies. Contests were held in 92 of the constituencies, just over a third of the total. The new Parliament lasted less than a year, and its proceedings were dominated by the attempt to confer the succession of the Crown on the House of Hanover.

English Parliament of General Election 1701

== Summary of the constituencies ==
See 1796 British general election for details. The constituencies used in England and Wales were the same throughout the period. In 1707 alone, the 45 Scottish members were not elected from the constituencies but were returned by co-option of a part of the membership of the last Parliament of Scotland elected before the Union.

Party strengths are an approximation, with many MPs' allegiances being unknown.

== See also ==
- 5th Parliament of King William III
- List of parliaments of England
