= Anthony Rowe (MP) =

English Whig politician

Arms of Roe/Rowe of Muswell Hill, Middlesex: Gules, a quatrefoil or

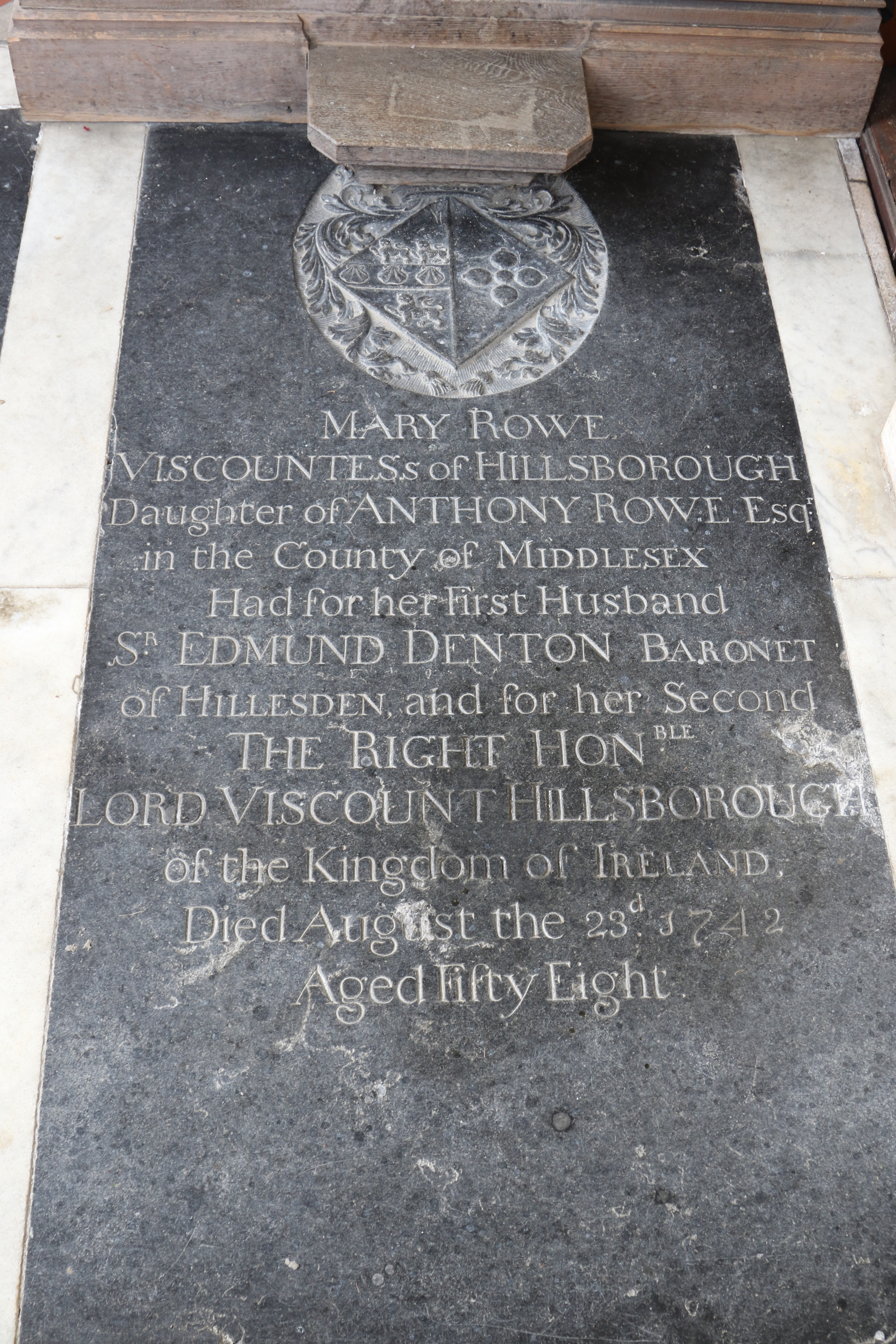
Ledger stone of Mary Rowe (Viscountess Hillsborough), eldest daughter and co-heiress of Anthony Rowe, All Saints' Church, Hillesden

Anthony Rowe (after 1641 – 9 September 1704) was an English Whig politician who sat in the House of Commons of England for several periods between 1689 and 1701.

== Biography ==
Rowe was the son of Sir Thomas Rowe of Muswell Hill in Middlesex by his wife Anne Langton. He was a descendant of William Rowe and was a cousin of Thomas Roe.

In the 1670s, Rowe became an associate of James Scott, 1st Duke of Monmouth and served as his adjutant during the Flanders campaign of 1678. In 1679 he was granted lease of a hearth tax tax farm for five years. He remained aligned to Monmouth and in 1683 he was publicly denied any association with the Rye House Plot. Rowe was briefly arrested during the Monmouth Rebellion in 1685, but was soon released, and in March 1688 he was granted a general pardon by James II.

Rowe was a supporter of the Glorious Revolution of 1688 and in 1689 he was appointed to superintend the collection of taxes in western England. The same year, he was elected as a Member of Parliament for Penryn, appointed Clerk of the Green Cloth in the household of William III, and made a justice of the peace for Middlesex. During the Convention Parliament, he compiled and published a blacklist of those MPs who had voted that James II had not left the throne vacant during the Revolution, with the aim of influencing the subsequent election. In 1690, Rowe was returned for Mitchell. He then represented Stockbridge from November to December 1693, before sitting again for Mitchell from January 1701 to March 1701.

== Marriage and issue ==
He married Mary Manley, a daughter of Robert Manley, of Stepney, Middlesex, a merchant, but died without male issue, leaving three daughters and co-heiresses:

- Mary Rowe (Viscountess Hillsborough) (1683/4-1742), wife successively of Sir Edmund Denton, 1st Baronet, (1676-1714) of Hillesden, Buckinghamshire, MP, and of Trevor Hill, 1st Viscount Hillsborough (1693-1742)
- Charlotte Rowe (d.1742), wife of Lt-Col. George Forrester, 5th Lord Forrester of Corstorphine
- Arabella/Isabella Rowe, 3rd daughter, wife of John Cockburn (1679-1758) of Ormiston, East Lothian, Scotland, MP.

Parliament of England
Preceded by Sir Nicholas Slanning, Bt; Henry Fanshawe	Member of Parliament for Penryn; 1689–1690; With: Alexander Pendarves	Succeeded by Alexander Pendarves; Samuel Rolle
Preceded by Humphrey Courtney; Francis Vyvyan	Member of Parliament for Mitchell; March–November 1690; With: Francis Scobell	Succeeded by Francis Scobell; Humphrey Courtney
Preceded by Richard Whithed; Thomas Jervoise	Member of Parliament for Stockbridge; November–December 1693; With: Thomas Jervoise	Succeeded by Thomas Jervoise; Second seat vacant until November 1694
Preceded by John Povey; Sir John Hawles	Member of Parliament for Mitchell; January–March 1701; With: William Beaw	Succeeded by William Beaw; Sir Richard Vyvyan, Bt
