= William Culliford =

MP for Corfe Castle
- In office 1690 – 6 April 1699

William Culliford (died 1724) was a politician who sat in the House of Commons of England representing Corfe Castle.

== Biography ==
Culliford’s father Robert Culliford had represented Wareham in the reign of Charles II. Culliford was a high ranking officer in the King's customs service.

In 1700, Culliford married Mary Chaple in Martock. Culliford was the last member of his family to own Encombe House. He was buried at Corfe Castle on 19 March 1724.
