= James Praed (died 1687) =

English politician

James Praed (died 1687) was an English politician who sat in the House of Commons from 1660 to 1679.

Praed was the son of James Praed of Trevethoe, Cornwall and his wife Honor Jenkyn, daughter of James Jenkyn of St Columb Major.

He was appointed Sheriff of Cornwall for 1654. In 1660, he was elected Member of Parliament for St Ives in the Convention Parliament. It was a double return and he was not seated until May. He was re-elected MP for St Ives in 1661 for the Cavalier Parliament and sat until 1679.

Praed married Honor Gifford, daughter of Arthur Gifford of Brightley, Devon. They had sons James and John who were both MPs for St Ives.
