= John Smith (Southampton MP) =

English Member of Parliament

John Smith was an English politician who was Member of Parliament for Southampton from 1698 to 1700 in the third Parliament of William III of England.
