= Benjamin Newland =

Sir Benjamin Newland (c. 1633 – 1699) was a merchant originally from Cowes, Isle of Wight, who served as Member of Parliament for the Southampton constituency for three terms.

He was the son of William Newland, an Isle of Wight merchant and was educated at Pembroke College, Cambridge.

He was also an alderman of the City of London, a freeman of Southampton and as appointed (though never served) as a commissioner of public accounts.

He represented the Southampton constituency as Member of Parliament from 1678 to 1681, 1685 to 1687 and 1689 to 1699 and was knighted in 1679.

He died in 1699. He had married in 1671 Anne, the daughter of Robert Richbell, a Southampton merchant and MP and had a son and a daughter. His coat of arms has been placed on a shield on Southampton's Bargate.
