= Richard Norton (died 1732) =

MP for Hampshire (c.1666 – 1732)

Richard Norton (circa 1666 – 10 December 1732) was an English politician and playwright who served as MP for Hampshire from 9 January 1693 till 1700 and 1702 till 1705.

He was the oldest son of Daniel Norton and Isabel Norton (nee Lawson). He was educated at Christ Church, Oxford. In February 1702, he married Lady Elizabeth Noel, the daughter of Edward Noel, 1st Earl of Gainsborough.

In 1696, he published a play called Pausanias, The Betrayer of His Country.
