= Richard Whithed (Stockbridge MP) =

English politician

Richard Whithed (c. 1660 – 17 March 1693) was an English politician from Hampshire who sat in the House of Commons of England between 1689 and 1693.

Whithed was elected in 1690 as a Member of Parliament for the borough of Stockbridge. He was re-elected in 1690, and held the seat until his death from smallpox on 17 March 1693.

Parliament of England
Preceded by Essex Strode; John Head	Member of Parliament for Stockbridge; 1689–1693; With: Oliver St John January–September 1689; William Montagu September–December 1689; Thomas Neale 1689–1690; William Montagu 1690–91; Thomas Jervoise from 1691	Succeeded by Thomas Jervoise; Anthony Rowe
