= 1702 English general election =

General election in England

- July – August 1702

All 513 seats in the House of Commons 257 seats needed for a majority
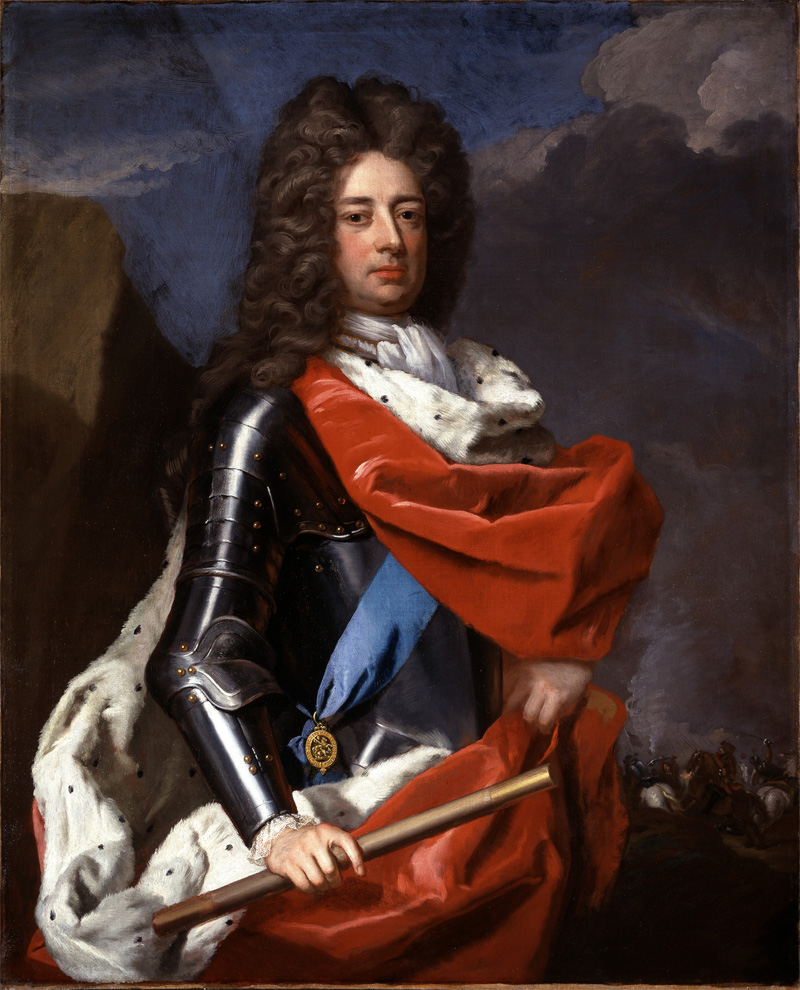

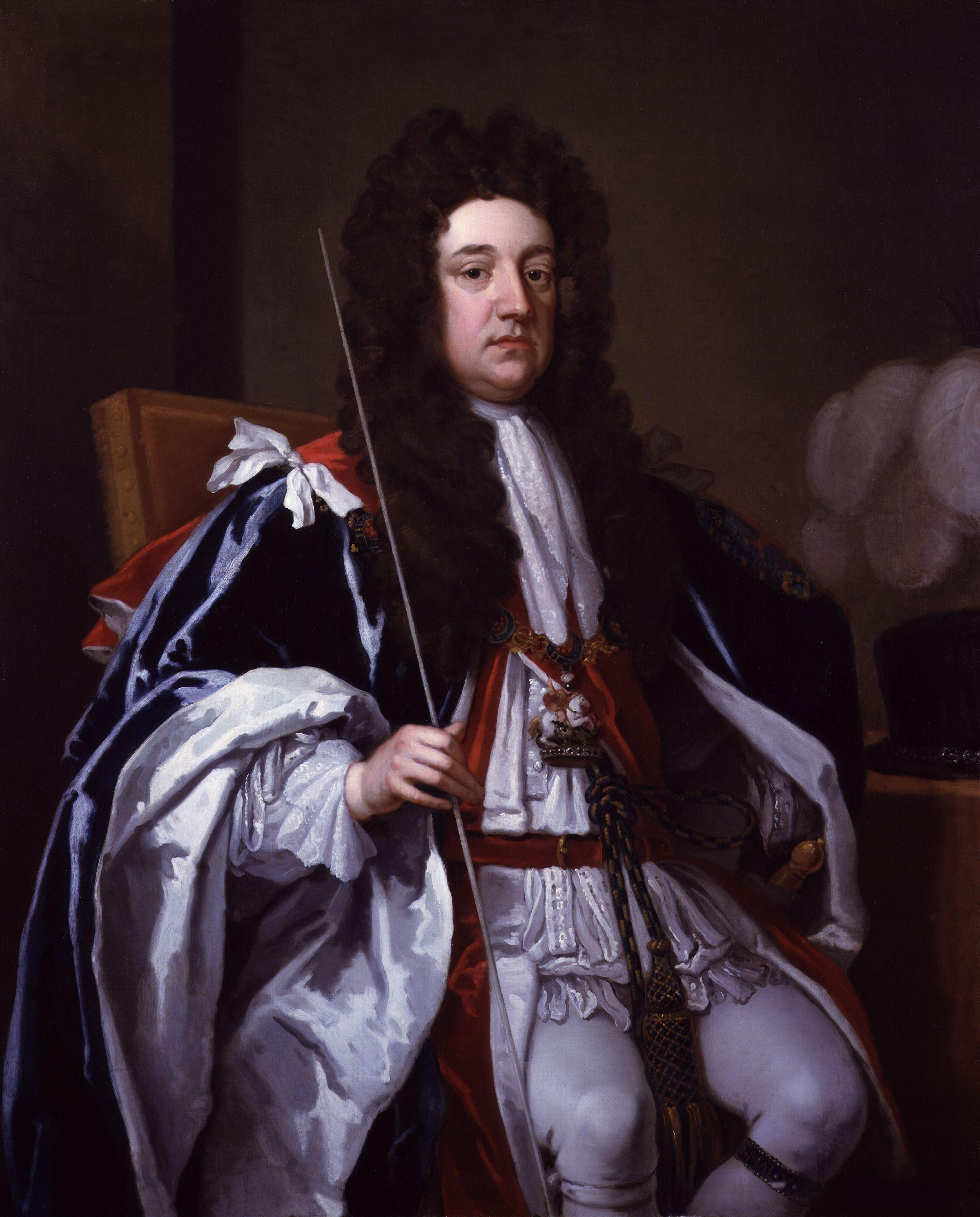

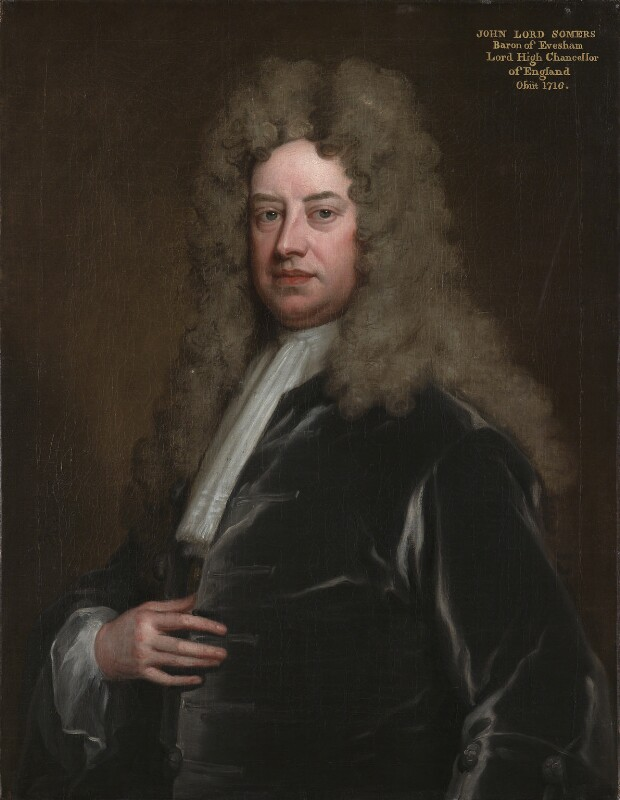

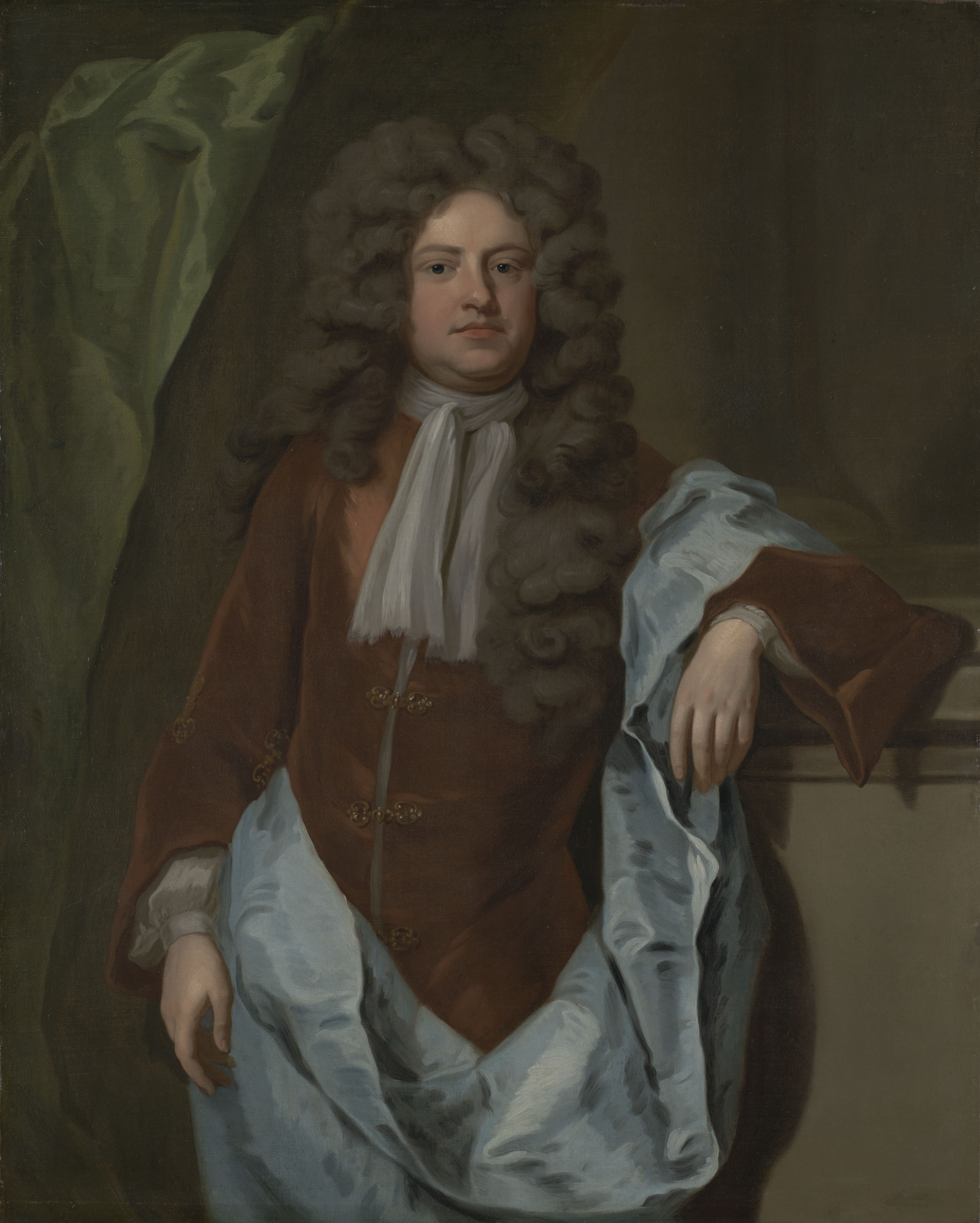

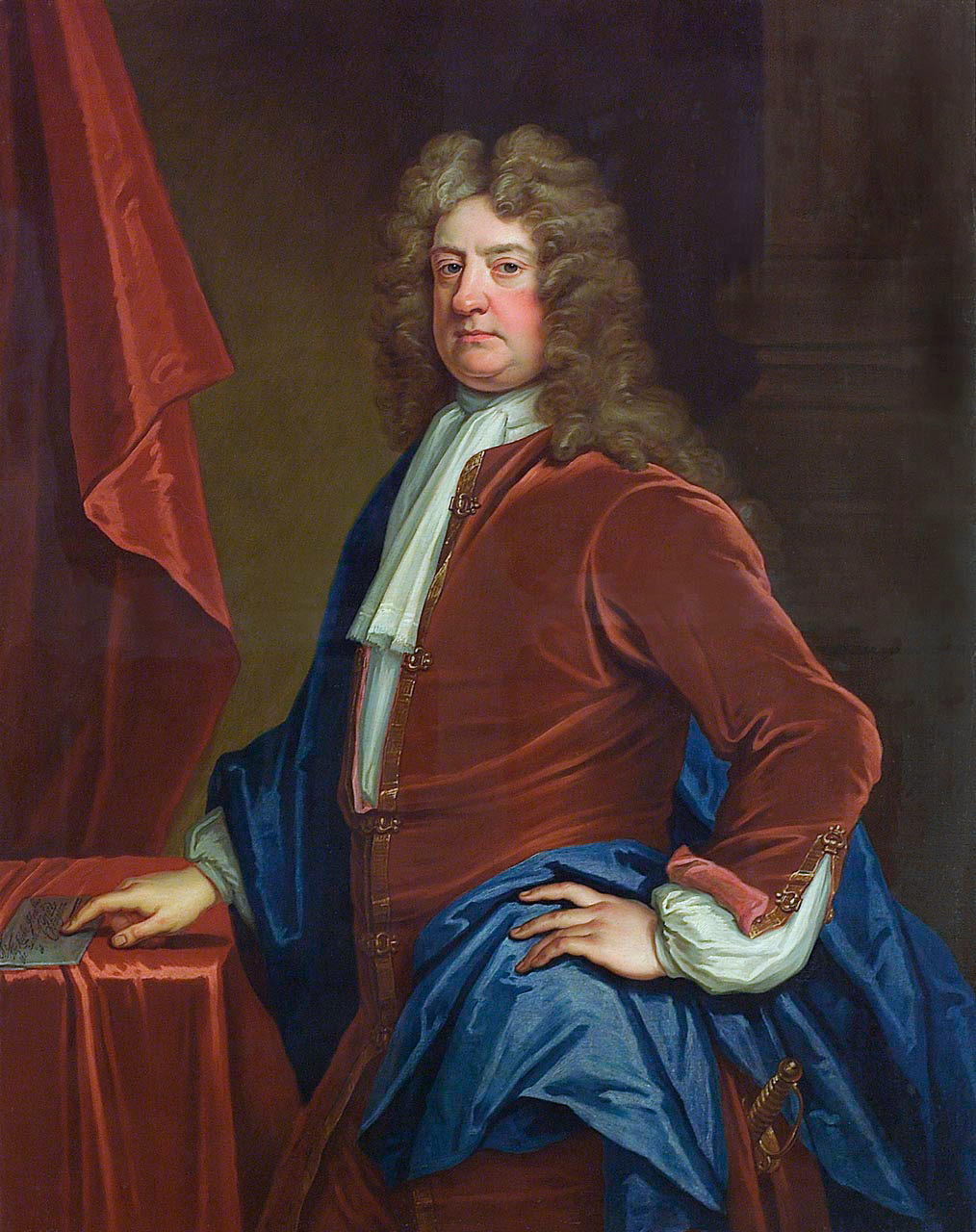
	First party	Second party
Leader	Duke of Marlborough; Baron Godolphin	Whig Junto (Baron Somers, Baron Halifax, Baron Wharton)
Party	Tory	Whig
Seats won	298	184
Seat change	▲58	▼64
- Composition of the House of Commons after the election

English Parliament of General Election 1702

The 1702 English general election was the first to be held during the reign of Queen Anne, and was necessitated by the demise of William III. The new government dominated by the Tories gained ground in the election, with the Tory party winning a substantial majority over the Whigs, owing to the popularity of the new monarch and a burst of patriotism following the coronation. Despite this, the government found the new Parliament difficult to manage, as its leading figures Godolphin and Marlborough were not sympathetic to the more extreme Tories. Contests occurred in 89 constituencies in England and Wales.

== Summary of the constituencies ==
See 1796 British general election for details. The constituencies used in England and Wales were the same throughout the period. In 1707 alone the 45 Scottish members were not elected from the constituencies, but were returned by co-option of a part of the membership of the last Parliament of Scotland elected before the Union.

Party strengths are an approximation, with many MPs' allegiances being unknown.

== See also ==
- 1st Parliament of Queen Anne
- List of parliaments of England
- Government of the United Kingdom
- Elections in the United Kingdom
