= James Praed (died 1706) =

English politician

James Praed (ca. 1655 – 1706) was an English Tory politician who sat in the House of Commons in 1681 and between 1689 and 1705.

== Biography ==
Praed was the eldest son of James Praed of Trevethoe, Cornwall and his wife Honor Gifford, daughter of Arthur Gifford of Brightley, Devon. He matriculated at Exeter College, Oxford on 27 June 1671 aged 15 and entered Middle Temple in 1674. He was a colonel in the militia.

In 1681, Praed was elected Member of Parliament for St Ives. He was re-elected MP for St Ives in 1689 and sat until 1705. He voted against the vacancy of the throne after the Glorious Revolution and was classed as a Tory in a list of March 1690. During his time in parliament he had considerable periods of absence and was taken into custody briefly for non-attendance in November 1694. He signed the Association of 1696 and was absent from the division on the attainder of Sir John Fenwick, 3rd Baronet having been granted a leave of absence for ill-heath. He voted for the Tack in 1704 and was defeated at the election in 1705. He was recorder of Penzance from 1693 until his death in 1706, and stannator for Penwith and Kerrier in 1703.

Praed married Lucy Basset, daughter of John Basset of Tehidy, Illogan, Cornwall, shortly before his death. He left all his personal property to his wife and his encumbered estates to his brother John.
