= Monoux baronets =

Extinct baronetcy in the Baronetage of England

The Monoux Baronetcy, of Wootton in the County of Bedford, was a title in the Baronetage of England. It was created on 4 December 1660 for Humphrey Monoux. The second Baronet sat as Member of Parliament for Bedfordshire. The third Baronet was Member of Parliament for Bedford. The fourth Baronet sat as Member of Parliament for Tavistock and Stockbridge. The title became extinct on the death of the seventh Baronet in 1814.

The family seat was Wootton House, Wootton, Bedfordshire.

== Monoux baronets, of Wootton (1660) ==
Escutcheon of the Monoux baronets of Wootton

- Sir Humphrey Monoux, 1st Baronet (died 1676)
- Sir Humphrey Monoux, 2nd Baronet (1640–1685)
- Sir Philip Monoux, 3rd Baronet (1679–1707)
- Sir Humphrey Monoux, 4th Baronet (c. 1702–1757)
- Sir Philip Monoux, 5th Baronet (c. 1739–1805)
- Sir Philip Monoux, 6th Baronet (died 1809)
- Sir Philip Monoux, 7th Baronet (died 1814)
