= Bedfordshire Militia =

Military unit in England 1558–1953

Bedfordshire Militia Bedfordshire Light Infantry 3rd Battalion, Bedfordshire Regiment
- Active: 1558–1 April 1953
- Country: England 1661–1707; Kingdom of Great Britain (1758–1800); United Kingdom (1801–1953)
- Branch: Militia/Special Reserve
- Role: Infantry
- Size: 1 Battalion
- Part of: Bedfordshire Regiment
- Garrison/HQ: Bedford (Kempston Barracks from 1876)
- Mottos: Pro aris et focis ('For heath and home')

Commanders
- Notable commanders: Francis Russell, Marquess of Tavistock; John FitzPatrick, 2nd Earl of Upper Ossory; Sir John Osborn, 5th Baronet; Sir Richard Gilpin, 1st Baronet; Herbrand Russell, 11th Duke of Bedford; Oliver Russell, 2nd Baron Ampthill

The Bedfordshire Militia, later the Bedfordshire Light Infantry was an auxiliary military regiment in the English county of Bedfordshire. From their formal organisation as Trained Bands, in 1572 and their service during the Armada Crisis and in the English Civil War, the Militia of Bedfordshire served during times of international tension and all of Britain's major wars. The regiment provided internal security and home defence, relieving regular troops from routine garrison duties and acting as a source of trained officers and men for the Regular Army. It later became a battalion of the Bedfordshire Regiment, and prepared thousands of reinforcements for the fighting battalions of the regiment in World War I. After 1921 the militia had only a shadowy existence until its final abolition in 1953.

== Early history ==
The English militia was descended from the Anglo-Saxon Fyrd, the military force raised from the freemen of the shires under command of their Sheriff. It continued under the Norman kings. The force was reorganised under the Assizes of Arms of 1181 and 1252, and again by King Edward I's Statute of Winchester of 1285. For the Great Muster held by King Henry VIII on 8 April 1539, Bedfordshire reported 219 archers and 528 billmen (however, the list only covers Bedford town and the three northern hundreds of the county):

- Bereford (Barford) Hundred: 44 archers, 130 billmen, 20 'pairs of harness' (sets of armour)
- Stodden Hundred: 32 archers, 122 billmen, 12 harness
- Wylly (Willey) Hundred: 67 archers, 179 billmen, 24 harness
- Bedford town: 75 archers, 97 billmen, 12 harness

In addition, four of the commissioners were assessed to harness another 74 men

== Bedfordshire Trained Bands ==
The legal basis of the militia was updated in Queen Mary I's reign with two acts of 1557 covering musters (4 & 5 Ph. & M. c. 3) and the maintenance of horses and armour (4 & 5 Ph. & M. c. 2). The county militia was now under the Lord Lieutenant, assisted by the Deputy Lieutenants and Justices of the Peace (JPs). The entry into force of these acts in 1558 is seen as the starting date for the organised county militia in England.

Bedfordshire was one of the southern counties called upon to send troops to suppress the Rising of the North in 1569. Although the militia obligation was universal, this assembly confirmed that it was clearly impractical to train and equip every able-bodied man. After 1572 the practice was to select a proportion of men for the Trained Bands (TBs), who were mustered for regular training. When war broke out with Spain training and equipping the militia became a priority. From 1584 counties were organised into groups for training purposes, with emphasis on the invasion-threatened 'maritime' counties. However, the small inland county of Bedfordshire was given little priority. The Armada Crisis in 1588 led to the mustering of the TBs in April. They were put on one hour's notice in June and called out on 23 July as the Armada approached, but Bedfordshire's muster from that year does not seen to have survived.

In the 16th Century little distinction was made between the militia and the troops levied by the counties for overseas expeditions. Between 1589 and 1601 Bedfordshire supplied over 1,200 levies for service in Ireland, France or the Netherlands. However, the counties usually conscripted the unemployed and criminals rather than the Trained Bandsmen – in 1585 the Privy Council had ordered the impressment of able-bodied unemployed men, and the Queen ordered 'none of her trayned-bands to be pressed'. Replacing the weapons issued to the levies from the militia armouries was a heavy cost on the counties.

With the passing of the threat of invasion, the TBs declined in the early 17th Century. Later, King Charles I attempted to reform them into a national force or 'Perfect Militia' answering to the king rather than local control. In 1638 the Bedford TBs mustered 500 foot armed with 296 muskets and 204 corslets (body armour, signifying pikemen), and 70 horsemen consisting of 40 Lancers and 30 light horse.

For the Second Bishops' War in 1640, Bedfordshire was ordered to muster 400 trained bandsmen at the general rendezvous on 25 May, to be marched on 5 June to Great Yarmouth, where they would be embarked on 10 June for Newcastle upon Tyne. Once again many of those sent on this unpopular service would have been untrained replacements and conscripts.

Control of the trained bands was one of the major points of dispute between Charles I and Parliament that led to the First English Civil War. When open warfare broke out between the King and Parliament, neither side made much use of the trained bands beyond securing the county armouries for their own full-time troops who would serve anywhere in the country, many of whom were former trained bandsmen.

Once Parliament had re-established full control it passed new Militia Acts in 1648 and 1650 that replaced lords lieutenant with county commissioners appointed by Parliament or the Council of State. At the same time the term 'Trained Band' began to disappear. Under the Commonwealth and Protectorate the militia received pay when called out, and operated alongside the New Model Army to control the country.

In response to the Scottish invasion in 1651 during the Third English Civil War, the Bedfordshires were ordered to a militia rendezvous at Northampton. Although some of the regiments at this rendezvous did take part in the subsequent Battle of Worcester, the Bedfordshires were part of the reserve held at Coventry.

== Restoration Militia ==
After the Restoration of the Monarchy, the English Militia was re-established by the Militia Act 1661 (13 Cha. 2 St. 1. c. 6) under the control of the king's lords lieutenant, the men to be selected by ballot. This was popularly seen as the 'Constitutional Force' to counterbalance a 'Standing Army' tainted by association with the New Model Army that had supported Cromwell's military dictatorship, and almost the whole burden of home defence and internal security was entrusted to the militia. The militia were frequently called out during the reign of King Charles II; for example, the Bedfordshires were alerted in 1666 because of a French and Dutch invasion threat.

A national muster of the militia was called in 1697. The Lord Lieutenant of Bedfordshire, William Russell, 1st Duke of Bedford, reported one foot regiment of five companies totalling 420 men under his son, Lord Edward Russell, as Colonel, and Sir John Burgoyne, 3rd Baronet, as Lieutenant-Colonel, together with two Troops of Horse totalling 119 men under Captain Sir Rowland Alston, 3rd Baronet of Odell. The militia were reported to be in good condition.

The Militia passed into virtual abeyance during the long peace after the Treaty of Utrecht in 1712, although some were called out during the Jacobite risings of 1715 and 1745.

== 1757 Reforms ==
Under threat of French invasion during the Seven Years' War the Militia Act 1757 (30 Geo. 2. c. 25) reorganised the county militia regiments, the men being conscripted by means of parish ballots (paid substitutes were permitted) to serve for three years. In peacetime they assembled for 28 days' annual training. There was a property qualification for officers, who were commissioned by the lord lieutenant. An adjutant and drill sergeants were to be provided to each regiment from the Regular Army, and arms and accoutrements would be supplied when the county had secured 60 per cent of its quota of recruits.

Bedfordshire's quota was set at 400 men but there were anti-militia riots in the county: on 30 August there was a rising in the eastern parts and the magistrates assembled to conduct the ballot at Biggleswade were warned that a thousand men were coming to murder them, so they fled. The mob levied 'contributions' from their houses, took the parish lists from the inn where the meeting was to have been held and broke the windows. The troubles continued for a few weeks and then subsided. The Lord Lieutenant of Bedfordshire, the 4th Duke of Bedford, set about finding the officers, but unlike Devonshire (where the Duke was also lord lieutenant), the gentlemen of the county were slow to come forward. It was not until 8 September 1759 that he was able to report that he had selected the officers. His son the Marquess of Tavistock (aged 19) was to be the colonel and Sir George Osborn, 4th Baronet (aged 17), the major (there was no lieutenant-colonel because it was such a small regiment). Though young, they were very keen. The Marquess of Tavistock confessed that he was militia mad', and that it was 'my ruling passion in life', and Osborn later became a General. Among the other officers were the Earl of Upper Ossory and Sir Philip Monoux, 5th Baronet, as captains, but Viscount Torrington was (at his own request) only an ensign.

The other ranks (ORs) were then to be raised by ballot. Tavistock found that most parishes in the county raised money (6 to 10 guineas each) to offer bounties to volunteers willing to serve in place of the balloted men. The regiment received its weapons and was officially formed on 25 February 1760. On 4 March it was embodied for full-time service. After training, it marched on 2 June to join a large camp being formed at Winchester in Hampshire, where a number of militia regiments were trained alongside the 34th Foot. In November it marched back to Bedford for winter quarters. In July 1761 the regiment marched to Sandy Heath Camp near Guildford in Surrey, where it trained alongside the 34th and 72nd Foot. The camp broke up in November and the regiment marched to Northampton, where it spent a few weeks, before returning to Bedford. Although the war continued, the Bedfordshire Militia was disembodied at the end of December 1761, after a year and seven months' service.

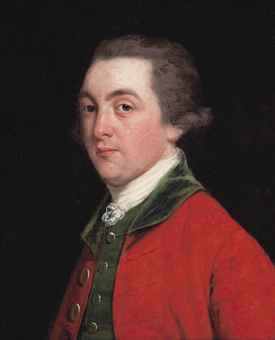
The 2nd Earl of Upper Ossory, painted by Thomas Beach ca 1765, wearing a red coat with dark green facings.

In 1763 the disembodied Bedfordshire Militia was reduced to six companies, including a Grenadier Company, totalling 400 ORs; the colonel would only rank as a lieutenant-colonel commandant. The six companies were to be based as follows:

- Woburn – Lt-Col's, the Grenadiers
- Harrold
- Dunstable
- Leighton Buzzard
- Ampthill
- Bedford

Annual training continued for the militia thereafter, ballots were held regularly, and officers were commissioned to fill vacancies. The Marquess of Tavistock died in 1767, and his father the Duke of Bedford died at the beginning of January 1771: on 20 January 1771 the Earl of Upper Ossory was appointed Lord-Lieutenant of Bedfordshire and colonel of the Bedfordshire Militia. (Note: Although a regiment with fewer than eight companies was only entitled to two field officers, it was entitled to the third if the lord lieutenant took the colonelcy himself.)

=== American War of Independence ===
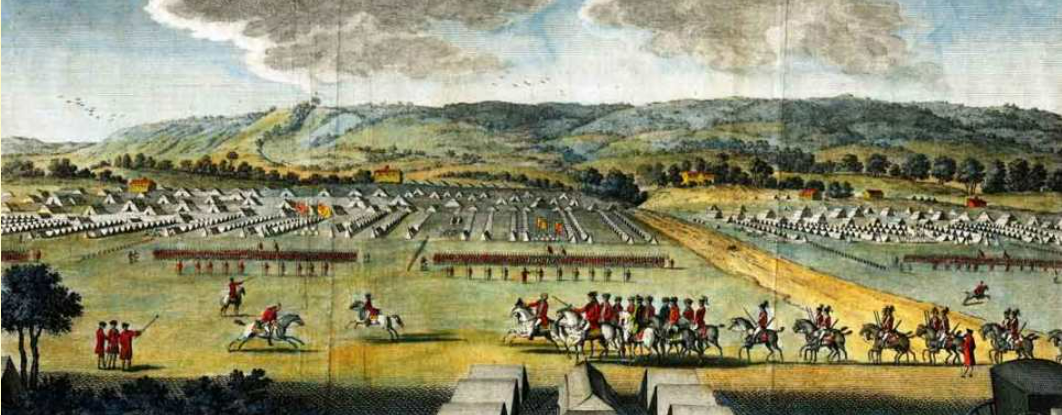
Coxheath Camp in 1778.

The militia was called out after the outbreak of the War of American Independence when the country was threatened with invasion by the Americans' allies, France and Spain. The Bedfordshire Militia was embodied in the spring of 1778, and on 5 May marched to Southampton. It arrived on 17 June and was quartered there until July 1779. It then marched to Winchester, where it guarded French prisoners-of-war. During this stay a Bedfordshire militiaman shot dead a prisoner who was 'attempting to go beyond his bounds'. In November the regiment marched to Taunton in Somerset, arriving in December and staying until May 1780. It then moved to Tavistock, and then joined a militia encampment at Buckland Down for the summer. The camp broke up on 31 October and the regiments went into winter quarters, the Bedfordshires returning to their own county. In June 1781 the regiment moved to Coxheath Camp near Maidstone in Kent. This was the army's largest training camp, where the militia were exercised as part of a division alongside regular troops while providing a reserve in case of French invasion of South East England. In 1781 it was under the command of Lt-Gen Thomas Gage. After the camp broke up in November, the regiment was quartered in Northampton, with detachments at Wellingborough and Kettering. In April 1782 it returned to Bedford, and then in June marched into Essex to join a camp at Danbury under Major-General St John. The regiment left this camp on 4 November and returned to quarters at Bedford. Hostilities ended with the Treaty of Paris and the militia could be stood down, the Bedfordshires being disembodied on 14 March 1783

From 1784 to 1792 the militia were supposed to assemble for 28 days' annual training, even though to save money only two-thirds of the men were actually called out each year. In 1786 the number of permanent non-commissioned officers (NCOs) was reduced.

=== French Revolutionary War ===
The militia were already being called out when Revolutionary France declared war on Britain on 1 February 1793. The Bedfordshires were embodied on 4 February 1793 under the command of the Earl of Upper Ossory. In March the regiment with six companies began moving by stages to a large camp being formed at Harwich in Essex, but did not join until the end of July. At the end of October it moved into barracks in Harwich for the winter. In June 1794 it camped outside Harwich once more with another regiment, having detachments at Landguard Fort, Mistley, and Manningtree. The camp was broken up on 6 November and the Bedfordshires went into winter quarters at Beccles until April 1795 when it was stationed in Norfolk at Yarmouth and Aldborough.

On 25 June 1795 the Earl of Upper Ossory gave up personal command of the Bedfordshire Militia and Lt-Col Francis Moore was promoted to succeed him as colonel. That month the regiment marched to camp at Warley in Essex. This was a large camp of Regular and Militia regiments under Lt-Gen Cornwallis. However, after a month the Bedfordshires were moved to Danbury where a militia brigade was camped under Maj-Gen Morshead. In November the regiment moved to Kent, being ferried across the Thames Estuary near Tilbury Fort by boat, and spent the winter at Maidstone. The following February it was posted in the forts at Dungeness before going into camp at Brighton on 18 July under Maj-Gen Jones. For winter quarters it was in Shoreham-by-Sea with detachments at [[Southwick, West in Sussex |Southwick]], Worthing, Cuckfield and Littlehampton. However, its stay here was short, because on 24 December it was one of the regiments that moved into the newly completed barracks at Horsham.

On 17 February 1797 the militia were formed into brigades for their summer training. The Bedfordshires, together with the Derbyshires, East Hampshires, East Suffolks and Yorkshire West Ridings, formed General Sir Charles Grey's 4th Brigade of the division under Gen Sir William Howe. The Bedfordshires marched out of Horsham on 21 May 1797 and arrived at Eastbourne on 1 June. By now it consisted of eight companies, including a Grenadier Company and a Light Infantry Company (known as 'flank companies'), and was equipped with two 6-pounder 'battalion guns'. Two companies were stationed in the forts. The troops at Eastbourne were commanded by Maj-Gen Forbes under Sir Charles Grey. On 24 October the regiment marched to Lewes for the winter, where it formed a brigade with the South Hants Militia.

At this time junior militia officers were prone to disobedience to routine orders and disrespect to their superiors, and in February 1798 a general court-martial presided over by the colonel of the East Kent Militia was held at Lewes on two lieutenants of the Bedfordshire Militia. One was dismissed from the service, the other required to resign. These seem to be the only courts-martial recorded on officers of the regiment.

=== Supplementary Militia ===
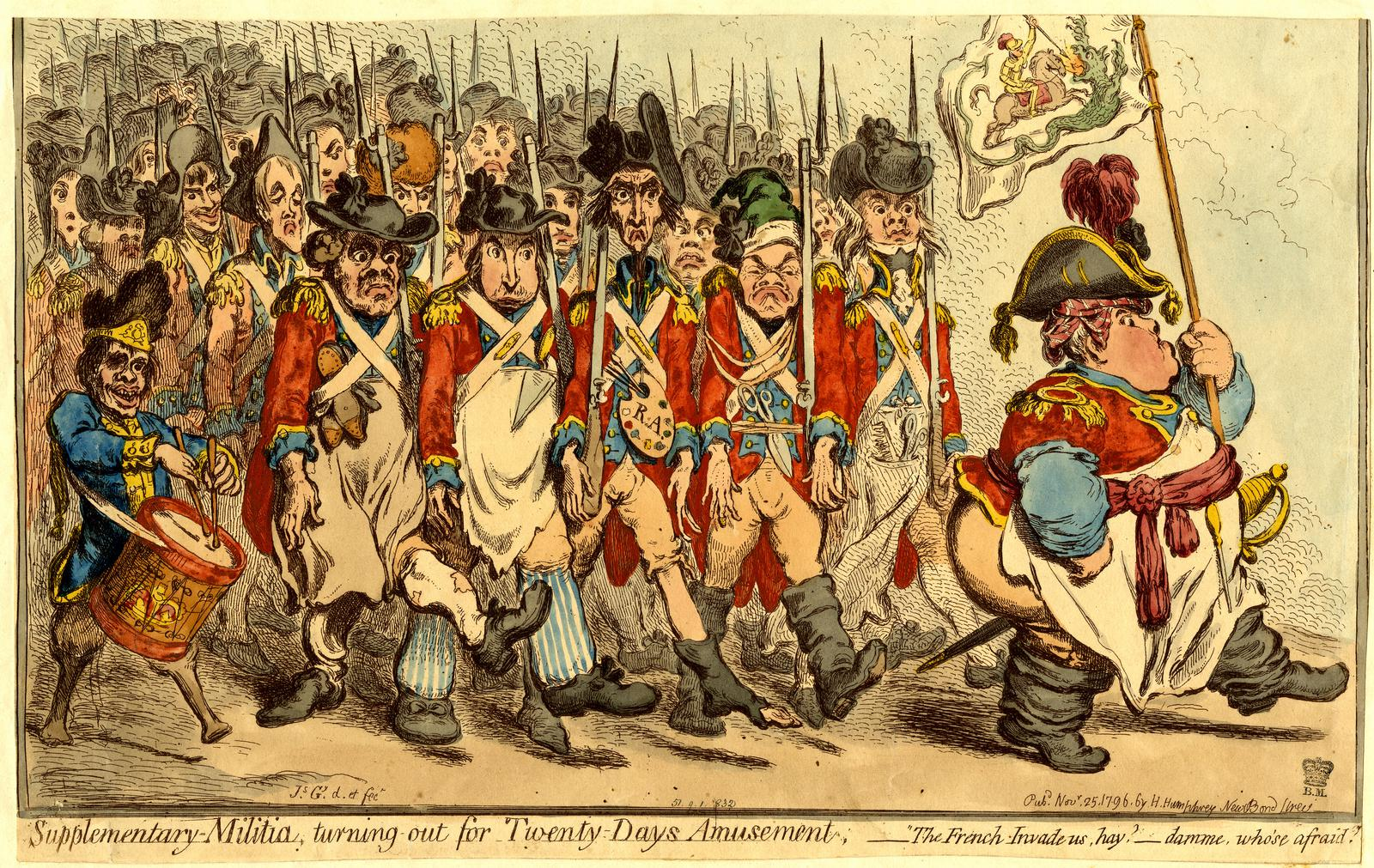
Supplementary-Militia, turning-out for Twenty Days Amusement: 1796 caricature by James Gillray.

In order to have as many men as possible under arms for home defence to release regulars, the Government created the Supplementary Militia in 1796, a compulsory levy of men to be trained in their spare time, and to be incorporated in the Militia in emergency. Bedfordshire's additional quota was fixed at 254 men. The lieutenancies were required to carry out 20 days' initial training of these men as soon as possible.

Early in 1798 the embodied militia regiments were ordered to be augmented from the supplementaries. On 26 March 1798 the Bedfordshire Militia at Lewes was reinforced by a draft of supplementary militiamen who had been marched from Bedford by two officers who had been there on leave. The augmented regiments expanded their flank companies to 100 men each.

=== Ireland ===
In May 1798 the Bedfordshire Militia was distributed across Kent, Surrey and Sussex, with headquarters at Tunbridge Wells. The Irish Rebellion had become a serious threat, with the French sending help to the rebels. In June, the Bedfordshire was among the militia regiments that volunteered to serve in Ireland, and once the necessary legislation was passed by parliament it was one of 13 regiments whose offer was accepted. While waiting for the legislation, the regiment marched on 27–28 June from Tunbridge Wells to Hastings whee it camped on Bo-Peep Hill on the South Downs. On 8 July 1798 a general order was issued to form temporary battalions from the flank companies of militia regiments in the Southern District. The Grenadier Company of the Bedfordshires joined those of the Denbighshire, Derbyshire, Glamorgan, Middlesex and Northamptonshire Militia in the 3rd Grenadier Battalion at Shoreham-by-Sea, commanded by Lt-Col Payne of the Bedfordshires.

In early September, though badly reduced in numbers, the Bedfordshire Militia received its orders for Ireland. It was taken by waggons from Hastings to Rock Ferry, Cheshire, where it embarked under Col Moore. It arrived in two contingents on 20 and 22 September. While stationed at Kells and Trim in April 1799, 105 men of the regiment volunteered to transfer to regiments of the Line.

On 6 September 1799 the regiment began its return journey to England, marching to Drogheda and then embarking for Liverpool, where it arrived on 14 September and marched to Chester. From Chester on 20 September, it marched to Bedford, having been granted the special favour of being stationed close to their homes. It remained at Bedford with a detachment at Dunstable until May 1800, recruiting to refill its ranks.

In May 1800 the regiment marched to Taunton, where it stayed until September before going into garrison at Plymouth for the winter. In May 1801 the regiment was distributed around Plymouth, part in huts on Maker Heights, the remainder to Cawsand and Millbrook, and in Forts No 1 and 2. However peace negotiations for the Treaty of Amiens were under way, and in November 1801 the Bedfordshire Militia was ordered back to Bedford to be disembodied. This entailed a march of 254 miles in 17 days in severe winter weather. It arrived on 1 December and the men were disembodied the following day.

=== Napoleonic Wars ===
However, the Peace of Amiens was short-lived and Britain declared war on France once more on 18 May 1803, the Bedfordshire Militia having already been re-embodied on 25 March. The regiment left Bedford on 20 May and marched to Bristol where it was quartered in Horfield Barracks.

The regiment marched out in June the following year to join a militia camp at Aylesbeare in Devon under Brigadier-General Gore. During August the regiments in camp participated in a 'flying camp' to Hembury Fort near Honiton. The Bedfordshire left Aylesbeare at the end of October and went into winter quarters at Exeter. While quartered at Bristol the previous winter serious disputes had occurred between Col Moore and the senior officers. A Court of Enquiry had since been held, and on 12 January 1805 the Earl of Upper Ossory as Lord Lieutenant of Bedfordshire 'displaced' Col Moore and in his place appointed John Osborn, Member of Parliament (MP) for Bedford.

In March 1805 Col Osborn joined the regiment and marched it to barracks at Berry Head near Brixham where it remained until 23 July. It then moved to Lympstone Camp, where it joined Lt-Gen Charles Lennox's militia brigade for the summer while Napoleon's 'Army of England' massed at Boulogne and threatened invasion. On 1 September 1805 the regiment was 363 strong under the command of Lt-Col Richard Gilpin. On 15 September the brigade marched to Hemerdon, arriving on 20 September. This camp was broken up on 22 December and the regiments dispersed, the Bedfordshires going to Ottery St Mary, where it was quartered for the winter. In April 1806 the regiment marched by way of Poole to Gosport in Hampshire, where it went into barracks as part of the Portsmouth garrison. In August it moved into Colewort Barracks in Portsmouth itself, with two companies detached on the Isle of Wight. In October it moved to Hilsea Barracks, then into Gosport Military Barracks and finally in November into Fort Monckton, where it remained until early in 1808.

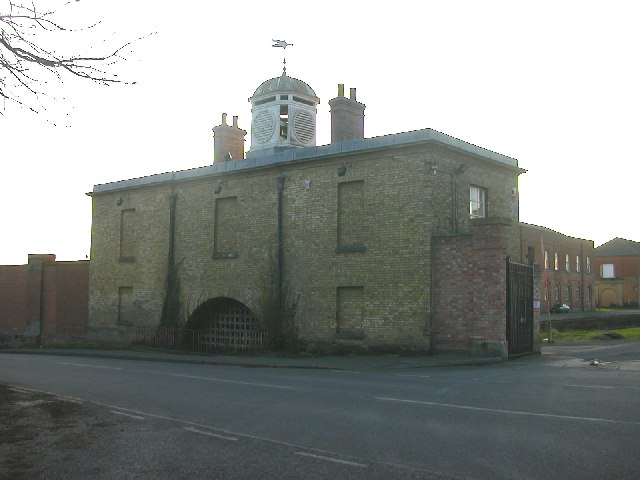
Weedon Barracks, where the Bedfordshire Militia was garrisoned from 1808 to 1810

On 15 February 1808 the regiment left Fort Monckton and marched to Winchester Barracks where it stayed until the end of July apart from a spell of duty at Southampton Assizes in March. On 1 August it received orders to move to Weedon Barracks in Northamptonshire, the first regiment to move into the newly built barracks. It remained there to protect the Weedon ordnance depot for almost two years. The Bedfordshires marched out on 2 July 1810, reaching Hastings on 11 July. It then moved on 11 August to Brighton, where it joined a great review of the Sussex Division on Balls Down by the Prince of Wales on 13 August. It remained in camp at Brighton until 13 November when it marched to Blatchington and went into huts. On 26 December it marched via Brighton to Horsham Barracks, moving to Littlehampton Barracks on 6 February 1811.

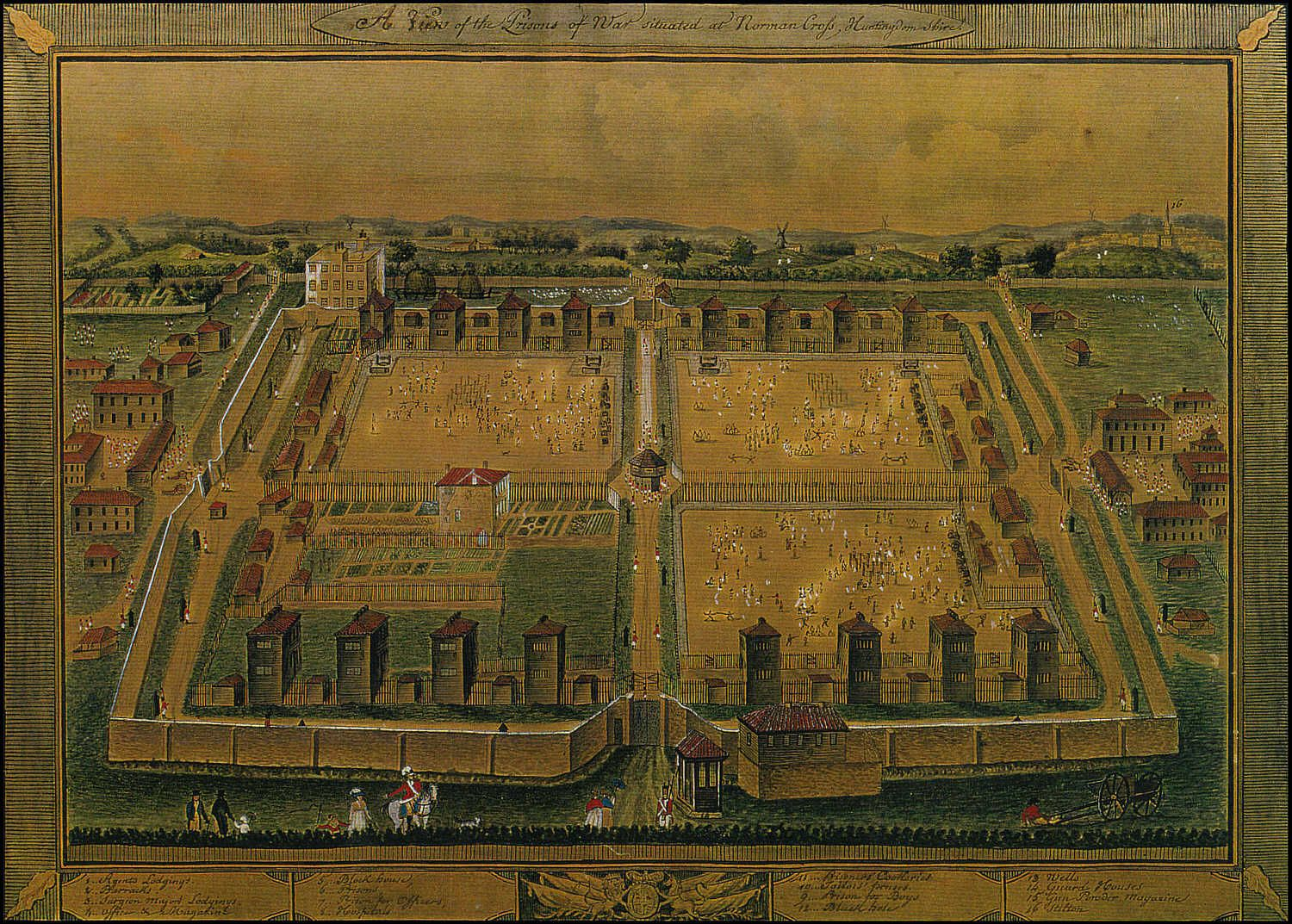
c. 1797 painting of Norman Cross Prison, where the Bedfordshire Militia served at in 1812

In April 1812 the regiment received urgent orders to proceed to Norman Cross, Cambridgeshire. This long march was carried out in six days by carrying the troops in waggons, the officers in Post chaises. The reason for the urgency was the arrival of large numbers of French prisoners from the Peninsular War at the great Norman Cross Prison, the world's first prisoner-of-war camp. The Bedfordshires remained on duty at Norman Cross until 28 October, when it marched out to go to Yarmouth for the winter.

=== Local Militia ===
While the Militia were the mainstay of national defence during the Revolutionary and Napoleonic Wars, they were supplemented from 1808 by the Local Militia, which were part-time and only to be used within their own districts. These were raised to counter the declining numbers of Volunteers, and if their ranks could not be filled voluntarily the Militia Ballot was employed. They would be trained once a year. Bedfordshire formed two regiments of Local Militia, each of eight companies, the first under the command of Lt-Cols Samuel Whitbread, MP for Bedford (who had commanded a regiment of Bedford Volunteers in 1803) and the Marquess of Tavistock, the 2nd under Lt-Cols Lord St John of Bletsoe (former MP for Bedford, who had been a captain in the Earl of Upper Ossory's Regiment of Bedford Volunteers in 1803 and later its lt-col) and R. Garstin. One of the captains in 1810 was Tavistock's younger brother Lord John Russell, the future Prime Minister.

=== Ireland again ===
Legislation passed in 1811 permitted English militia regiments to serve in Ireland once again, for a period of up to two years. In June 1813 the Bedfordshire Militia received orders for Ireland and on 14 June began the 215 miles (346 km) march from Yarmouth to Bristol, where it embarked on 14 July 1813. The regiment landed at Pigeon House Fort, Dublin, on 19 July and marched the same day to Maynooth. It continued to Tullamore where it stayed until 27 July, before being stationed at Athlone until 29 August. The regiment then moved to Roscommon, where it was based for almost a year. The war having ended in April, the regiment returned to Athlone on 26 July 1814 to prepare to sail back England. On 26 September it began its march to Dublin, where it embarked on 30 September and disembarked at Liverpool on 10 October. On arrival it was sent on a 246 miles (396 km) march to Colchester Barracks, arriving on 4 November. On 12 December it went to Ipswich and Woodbridge, Suffolk where it was quartered for the winter.

=== Long Peace ===
In January 1815 orders were issued to disembody the militia. The Bedfordshires marched to Bedford, where it was disembodied on 1 February. The arms were sent to Weedon for storage, and the permanent staff of sergeants and drummers under the adjutant used a storehouse rented by the county near Castle Close in Bedford. Some militia regiments were kept embodied or were re-embodied during the short Waterloo campaign, but the Bedfordshires were not among them. Nevertheless, the regular regiments that participated in the campaign had been brought up to strength with large numbers of volunteers from the militia and the officers of the 14th (Bedfordshire) Regiment of Foot claimed that many of their men who fought at Waterloo were still wearing the uniforms of the Bedfordshire and Berkshire Militia

After Waterloo there was another long peace. Although officers continued to be commissioned into the militia and ballots were still held, the regiments were rarely assembled for training and the permanent staffs of sergeants and drummers (who were occasionally used to maintain public order) were progressively reduced. The ballot was suspended by the Militia Act 1829. In 1845–46 there was an effort to replace elderly members of the permanent staff and to appoint a few younger officers from the county gentry, though they had no duties to perform. Col John Osborn succeeded as 5th Baronet of Chicksands Priory in 1818 and died in 1848. Richard Gilpin of Hockliffe, who had been lieutenant-colonel since 6 July 1803 served in the rank for 'upwards of 40 years'. His son, Lt-Col Richard Thomas Gilpin, a half-pay officer of the 14th Light Dragoons, who had joined the Bedfordshire Militia as a captain in 1820, was appointed colonel of the regiment on 11 September 1848. William Higgins was promoted to lt-col at the same time, having been commissioned as major in 1847. Colonel Gilpin became MP for Bedfordshire in 1851.

== 1852 reforms ==
The Militia of the United Kingdom was revived by the Militia Act 1852 (15 & 16 Vict. c. 50), enacted during a period of international tension. As before, units were raised and administered on a county basis, and filled by voluntary enlistment. Training was for 56 days on enlistment, then for 21–28 days per year, during which the men received full army pay. Under the Act, Militia units could be embodied by Royal Proclamation for full-time home defence service in three circumstances:

1. 'Whenever a state of war exists between Her Majesty and any foreign power'.
2. 'In all cases of invasion or upon imminent danger thereof'.
3. 'In all cases of rebellion or insurrection'.

The Bedfordshire Militia was resuscitated as the Bedford Light Infantry Militia, with an establishment strength of 19 officers and 550 ORs in six companies. It paraded for the first time on 16 November 1852 on St Peter's Green in Bedford, still under the command of the officers appointed in 1848. When the weather was bad it carried out its training in the sheds of the London and North Western Railway. The regiment assembled for annual training from 27 September to 23 October 1853, when the inspecting officer condemned the old storehouse as quite unfit for use. Annual training in 1854 was from 5 May to 1 June.

=== Crimean War ===
War broke out with Russia in 1854 and an expeditionary force was sent to the Crimea, the militia being called out for home defence. The Bedfordshire Light Infantry was called out on 15 July and assembled under Col Gilpin at Bedford on 1 August. It proceeded by rail to its assigned station at Berwick-upon-Tweed on 19 August. In October there were calls for militiamen to volunteer for the regular army, and by the end of the year 245 men of the Bedfordshire LI had taken the bounty. Seventy men of the regiment also had to be released because of a legal problem with their 1852 enlistments. Thus depleted, the regiment returned to Bedford in January 1855 to recruit. It remained there until 20 July, when it went by rail to Aldershot where it went into South Camp with a number of other militia regiments. The Bedfordshire LI left Aldershot by train on 10 December bound for Liverpool, where it embarked for Ireland next day. It landed at Kingstown on 12 December and was distributed by rail, three companies to Galway, two to Loughrea and one to Oughterard. Colonel Gilpin being in London on parliamentary business, the regiment was commanded by Lt-Col Higgins during its deployment to Ireland. The Treaty of Paris ended the war on 30 March 1856, and on 12 April the regiment was marched back to Linenhall Barracks in Dublin for a grand review. It continued to do duty in Dublin until 3 June, when it returned via Liverpool and was billeted in Bedford until disembodiment on 2 July 1856.

=== Indian Mutiny ===
During the disembodiment the county erected a new Militia Depot at Bedford to store the arms and clothing and with quarters for most of the NCOs of the permanent staff. When a large expeditionary force was sent to suppress the Indian Mutiny, many militia units were embodied again, the Bedfordshire LI assembling at Bedford on 2 November 1857. On 8 December it proceeded to Aldershot, where it went into huts at South Camp. Training exercises were conducted between troops in South Camp and North Camp. On 16 June 1858 the Bedfordshire LI was sent to Dover, where it occupied new barracks at the Castle. In June 1859 the regiment returned to South Camp, Aldershot. In August it received sudden orders to go to Dorsetshire, where HQ and two companies were sent to Weymouth, two companies to Dorchester, one to Portland (where it guarded convicts building Portland Harbour) and one to guard the Gunpowder magazine at Marchwood, Southampton. On 2 March 1860 the regiment moved to Colewort Barracks, Portsmouth. The Bedfordshire LI was one of the last militia units to be stood down after the suppression of the Mutiny: it was not until 7 February 1861 that it returned to Bedford to be disembodied on 14 February.

Over the following years the regiment was mustered each April for 21 or 27 days' training. Militia battalions now had a large cadre of permanent staff (about 30) and a number of the officers were former Regulars. Around a third of the recruits and many young officers went on to join the Regular Army. The Militia Reserve introduced in 1867 consisted of present and former militiamen who undertook to serve overseas in case of war. In 1869 the training routine was varied when the Bedfordshire LI were brigaded with other militia regiments from surrounding counties for a review in the Duke of Bedford's Woburn Park.

== Cardwell and Childers reforms ==
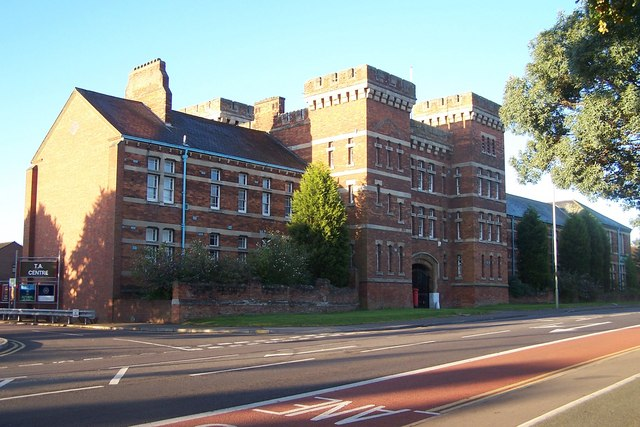
Kempston Barracks, Bedford.

Under the 'Localisation of the Forces' scheme introduced by the Cardwell Reforms of 1872, militia regiments were brigaded with their local Regular and Volunteer battalions. Sub-District No 33 (Huntingdonshire, Bedfordshire & Hertfordshire) set up its depot at Bedford, where Kempston Barracks was built for it 1875–6. It comprised:

- 1st and 2nd Battalions, 16th (Bedfordshire) Regiment of Foot
- Huntingdonshire Rifle Militia at Huntingdon
- Bedfordshire Light Infantry Militia at Bedford
- Hertfordshire Militia at Hertford
- 1st Administrative Battalion, Bedfordshire Rifle Volunteer Corps at Woburn
- 1st Administrative Battalion, Hertfordshire Rifle Volunteer Corps at Little Gaddesden
- 2nd Administrative Battalion, Hertfordshire Rifle Volunteer Corps at Hertford

At the same time the Bedfordshire LI was augmented to eight companies, a total of 820 all ranks. It was further increased to 904 in 1877. Following the Cardwell Reforms a mobilisation scheme began to appear in the Army List from December 1875. This assigned Regular and Militia units to places in an order of battle of corps, divisions and brigades for the 'Active Army', even though these formations were entirely theoretical, with no staff or services assigned. The Bedfordshire Militia were assigned to 2nd Brigade of 3rd Division, VII Corps. The brigade would have mustered at Newcastle upon Tyne in time of war. The Militia Reserve was mobilised on 19 April 1878 because of the Balkan Crisis. The Bedfordshire LI had 169 reservists on its strength, and only one failed to respond. Of these accepted for service, 69 reinforced the 16th Foot, 45 went to the Army Hospital Corps, and 50 to the Army Service Corps. The Militia Reserve men were dismissed back to their regiments in July 1878 after the Congress of Berlin ended the crisis.

On 24 January 1879 Col Gilpin (who had been created Sir Richard Gilpin, 1st Baronet of Hocking Grange in 1876), retired from the command. As part of the 1852 reforms the rank of colonel in the militia had been abolished, and the lieutenant-colonel would become commanding officer (CO). After Sir Richard Gilpin's retirement, Lt-Col and Honorary Colonel William Stuart assumed command. Sir Richard Gilpin. became the Bedford LI's first Honorary Colonel of the Regiment.

=== 3rd Battalion, Bedfordshire Regiment ===
c. 1924 cap badge for other ranks of the Bedfordshire and Hertfordshire Regiment. It incorporated the Hart emblem of the Hertfordshire Militia.

The Childers Reforms of 1881 completed the Cardwell process by converting the Regular regiments into two-battalion county regiments, each with two militia battalions. The 16th Foot became the Bedfordshire Regiment, the Huntingdonshire Rifles joined the King's Royal Rifle Corps, leaving the Bedfordshire LI as the 3rd and the Hertfordshire Militia as the 4th Bns of the Bedfordshire Regiment. The change adversely affected recruitment to the Bedfordshire Militia.

Sir John Burgoyne, 10th Baronet, was promoted to command the battalion in 1882. A former Captain and Lt-Col in the Grenadier Guards, who had seen action in the Crimean War, had been commissioned as major of the Bedfordshires on 18 April 1874. The difficulty of controlling men in billets and the lack of a rifle range at Bedford led to the suggestion that the 3rd Bn should join the 1st Bn at Shorncliffe Army Camp, for its annual training in 1882. The experiment was considered a success and was repeated the following year. On 12 June 1883, while 3rd Bn was at Shorncliffe, the Duchess of Bedford presented the battalion with its new colours, based on those of the Bedfordshire Regiment. (Note: Previous colours had been presented by the Duchesses of Bedford in 1760, 1799–1800, and 1855.)

During the annual training period in 1889 a review was held by Queen Victoria at Aldershot, at which the two Militia battalions of the Bedfordshire regiment were brigaded with those of the Suffolk Regiment. Herbrand Russell, 11th Duke of Bedford, who had seen action in the Egyptian Campaign of 1882 as an officer in the Grenadier Guards, was promoted to command the 3rd Bn on 22 December 1897.

During the Second Boer War, when the bulk of the Regular Army and Militia Reserve was sent to South Africa, the 3rd Bn was embodied on 8 May 1900. It served at home and then was disembodied on 4 December the same year.

== Special Reserve ==
After the Boer War, the future of the militia was called into question. There were moves to reform the Auxiliary Forces (Militia, Yeomanry and Volunteers) to take their place in the six Army Corps proposed by the Secretary of State for War, St John Brodrick. However, little of Brodrick's scheme was carried out. Under the more sweeping Haldane Reforms of 1908, the Militia was replaced by the Special Reserve (SR), a semi-professional force whose role was to provide reinforcement drafts for regular units serving overseas in wartime, rather like the earlier Militia Reserve. The battalion became the 3rd (Reserve) Battalion, Bedfordshire Regiment, on 21 June 1908. On that day, Oliver Russell, 2nd Baron Ampthill, a kinsman of the Duke of Bedford, was appointed CO. He was a former Governor of Madras and acting Viceroy of India, and had formerly served as a lieutenant in the Royal 1st Devon Yeomanry.

== World War I ==
=== 3rd (Reserve) Battalion ===
On the outbreak of World War I on 4 August 1914 the battalion was embodied at Bedford under the command of Lt-Col Lord Ampthill. It went to its war station at Felixstowe where together with the SR battalions of the Norfolk Regiment, Suffolk Regiment, Essex Regiment and Loyal North Lancashire Regiment, the 3rd Bn Bedfords formed an SR brigade to relieve the Territorial Force battalions in the Harwich Defences. The first task for the SR brigade was to dig entrenchments and erect barbed wire to supplement the defences, after which intensive training began. As well as defence tasks, the battalion's role was to equip Special Reservists, new recruits and returning wounded and send them as reinforcement drafts to the regular battalions of the Bedfords serving overseas. The 9th (Reserve) Bn (see below) was formed alongside it in the Harwich Garrison in October to supply drafts to the 'Kitchener's Army' battalions of the Bedfords that were being raised.

Lord Ampthill himself saw active service during the war as CO of one of the 'Kitchener' battalions, the 8th Bedfords, and later of the 13th Leicesters, and was twice mentioned in despatches and promoted to Brevet Colonel. The battalion's former CO, the 11th Duke of Bedford, also came out of retirement in 1914 as colonel commanding the Bedfordshire Regiment Training Depot.

3rd Bedfords spent the whole war in the Harwich Garrison, sending drafts to the fighting battalions: Under War Office Instruction 106 of 10 November 1915 the 3rd Bn was ordered to send a draft of 109 men to the new Machine Gun Training Centre at Grantham where they were to form the basis of a brigade machine-gun company of the new Machine Gun Corps. In addition, 10 men at a time were to undergo training at Grantham as battalion machine gunners. The order stated that 'Great care should be taken in the selection of men for training as machine gunners as only well educated and intelligent men are suitable for this work'.

No invasion force ever threatened the Harwich Defences during the war, but from January 1915 German airships and later aircraft were sometimes seen passing over the coast. On 4 July and 22 July 1917 squadrons of aircraft bombed the Felixstowe area, causing numerous casualties among the garrison and civilians.

Hostilities ended on 11 November 1918 with the Armistice with Germany. Demobilisation began shortly afterwards. The remaining personnel of the 3rd (Reserve) Bn were posted to the 1st Bn on 12 August 1919 and the battalion was disembodied the following day.

=== 9th (Reserve) Battalion ===
After Lord Kitchener issued his call for volunteers in August 1914, the battalions of the 1st, 2nd and 3rd New Armies ('K1', 'K2' and 'K3' of 'Kitchener's Army') were quickly formed at the regimental depots. The SR battalions also swelled with new recruits and were soon well above their establishment strength. On 8 October 1914 each SR battalion was ordered to use the surplus to form a service battalion of the 4th New Army ('K4'). Accordingly, the 3rd (Reserve) Bn in the Harwich defences formed the 9th (Service) Bn, Bedfordshire Regiment at Felixstowe in October. It became part of 94th Brigade in 31st Division. In early 1915 an outbreak of Cerebrospinal meningitis in the brigade caused the battalions to be scattered, the Bedfords going to Mill Hill in Middlesex. In April 1915 the War Office decided to convert the K4 battalions into 2nd Reserve units, providing drafts for the K1–K3 battalions in the same way that the SR was doing for the Regular battalions. 94th Brigade became 6th Reserve Brigade and the Bedford battalion became 9th (Reserve) Battalion, at Colchester, where it trained drafts for the 6th, 7th and 8th (Service) Bns of the regiment. On 1 September 1916 the 2nd Reserve battalions were transferred to the Training Reserve (TR) and the 9th Bedfords was absorbed into the other TR battalions of 6th Reserve Bde.

=== Postwar ===
The SR resumed its old title of Militia in 1921 and then became the Supplementary Reserve in 1924, but like most militia battalions the 3rd Bedfords remained in abeyance after World War I. By the outbreak of World War II in 1939, there were no officers listed for the battalion. (However, the Bedfordshire and Hertfordshire Regiment (as it became in 1919) did have a number of Supplementary Reserve officers Category B attached to it.) The Militia was formally disbanded in April 1953.

== Commanders ==
=== Colonels ===
The following served as Colonel of the Regiment:

- Francis Russell, Marquess of Tavistock, March 1759, died 22 March 1767.
- John FitzPatrick, 2nd Earl of Upper Ossory, assumed command 20 January 1771, resigned 25 June 1795.
- Col Francis Moore promoted 25 June 1795, 'displaced' 12 January 1805.
- Col Sir John Osborn, 5th Baronet, appointed 12 January 1805.
- Col Sir Richard Gilpin, 1st Baronet, MP, Brevet Lt-Col formerly of the Rifle Brigade, promoted 11 September 1848.

=== Lieutenant-Colonels ===
Lieutenant-Colonels of the regiment (commanding officers after 1879) included the following:

- John Marshe Dickinson, appointed 1760
- Hon James Stuart, appointed 1776, left 1779 to raise and command the 92nd Foot (Yorkshire Rangers) for service in the West Indies
- John Osborn, MP for Bedford, younger brother of Sir George, appointed 1779
- Francis Moore, promoted 1793
- Sir John Payne, Baronet, appointed 1795, died 1803
- Richard Gilpin, promoted 1803
- William Astell, appointed 1841
- Richard Gilpin, son of above, promoted 1847
- William Bartholomew Higgins, promoted 12 September 1848
- Robert Hindley Wilkinson, promoted 24 March 1858
- William Stuart, MP, promoted 16 June 1860
- Sir John Burgoyne, 10th Baronet, former Captain andLt-Col in the Grenadier Guards, promoted 1 May 1882
- Lt-Col A.H. Lucas, promoted 19 August 1893
- Col Herbrand Russell, 11th Duke of Bedford, KG, promoted 22 December 1897
- Lt-Col Oliver Russell, 2nd Baron Ampthill, GCSI, GCIE, promoted 21 June 1908

=== Honorary Colonels ===
The following served as Honorary Colonel of the regiment:

- Col Sir Richard Gilpin, 1st Baronet, former CO, appointed 25 June 1879, died 8 April 1882
- Col William Stuart, former CO, appointed 1 May 1882
- Col Sir John Burgoyne, 10th Baronet, former CO, appointed 20 January 1894, died 1921
- Bt-Col Oliver Russell, 2nd Baron Ampthill, GCSI, GCIE, former CO, died 7 July 1935.

=== Other notable members ===
- Captain-Lieutenant William Beecher, Bedfordshire Militia Horse 1660
- Maj Sir George Osborn, 4th Baronet, commissioned 1759, later General
- Capt Lord John Russell, 1810, the future Prime Minister
- Capt Sir Frederick Frankland, 10th Baronet, commissioned 29 August 1891, served in Second Matabele War, Second Boer War and World War I
- Capt and Hon Maj Sir Algernon Osborn, 7th Baronet, commissioned 3 May 1895

== Heritage and ceremonial ==
=== Uniforms and insignia ===
From 1760 the regiment wore red uniforms with green facings (described in the 19th Century as dark green). On joining the Bedfordshire Regiment in 1881 the dark green facings changed to the white of an English county regiment, much to the disgust of the Bedfordshire LI.

Four patterns of buttons are known for the regiment: the first (ca 1770–80) had '1' over 'BM'; the second had 'BM' within a crowned star; the officers' pattern (ca 1806–24) had the Royal Cypher 'GR' twice entwined within a crowned strap inscribed 'BEDFORD MILITIA'; the 1837–55 pattern changed the cypher to 'VR" and the strap to a garter. Two patterns of Local Militia buttons are known: one was similar to the 1806 militia button with the inscription altered to 'BEDFORD LOCAL MILITIA', the other had 'B' over 'LM' on an eight-pointed star.

For a short period after 1853 the officers' shoulder-belt plate had the number '18' between the strings of a light infantry bugle-horn with the regimental title on a scroll below, all on a cut star.

In 1858 the badge on the ORs' Forage cap was a scroll inscribed with the regimental title, with a bugle-horn above. The Glengarry cap of 1874–81 had a badge with castle and eagle within a circle inside the curl of a bugle-horn, the circle inscribed 'BEDFORDSHIRE MILITIA'. In 1881 the badge of the new Bedfordshire Regiment was adopted. There being no distinctive badge for Bedfordshire, this incorporated the 'Hart crossing a ford' of the Hertfordshire Militia.

=== Precedence ===
In September 1759 it was ordered that militia regiments on service were to take precedence from the date of their arrival in camp. In 1760 this was altered to a system of drawing lots where regiments did duty together. During the War of American Independence the counties were given an order of precedence determined by ballot each year. For the Bedfordshire Militia the positions were:

- 37th on 1 June 1778
- 21st on 12 May 1779
- 32nd on 6 May 1780
- 36th on 28 April 1781
- 24th on 7 May 1782

The militia order of precedence balloted for in 1793 (Bedfordshire was 42nd) remained in force throughout the French Revolutionary War. Another ballot for precedence took place in 1803 at the start of the Napoleonic War, when Bedfordshire was 13th. This order continued until 1833. In that year the King drew the lots for individual regiments and the resulting list remained in force with minor amendments until the end of the militia. The regiments raised before the peace of 1763 took the first 47 places; Bedfordshire was placed at 18th, and this was retained when the list was revised in 1855. Most militia regiments ignored the numeral, but the Bedfordshires did briefly include'18' in their insignia.

=== Memorials ===
A stained glass window in memory of Col Sir Richard Gilpin, 1st Baronet, was placed in St Paul's Church, Bedford, by the officers of the battalion. The 9th Duke of Bedford arranged for the 1855 Colours of the regiment to be placed by the sides of the memorial window when they were replaced in 1883.

== See also ==
- Trained Bands
- Militia (English)
- Militia (Great Britain)
- Militia (United Kingdom)
- Special Reserve
- Bedfordshire and Hertfordshire Regiment
