= Robert Phelips (Chancellor of the Duchy of Lancaster) =

English courtier, lawyer and politician (1619–1707)

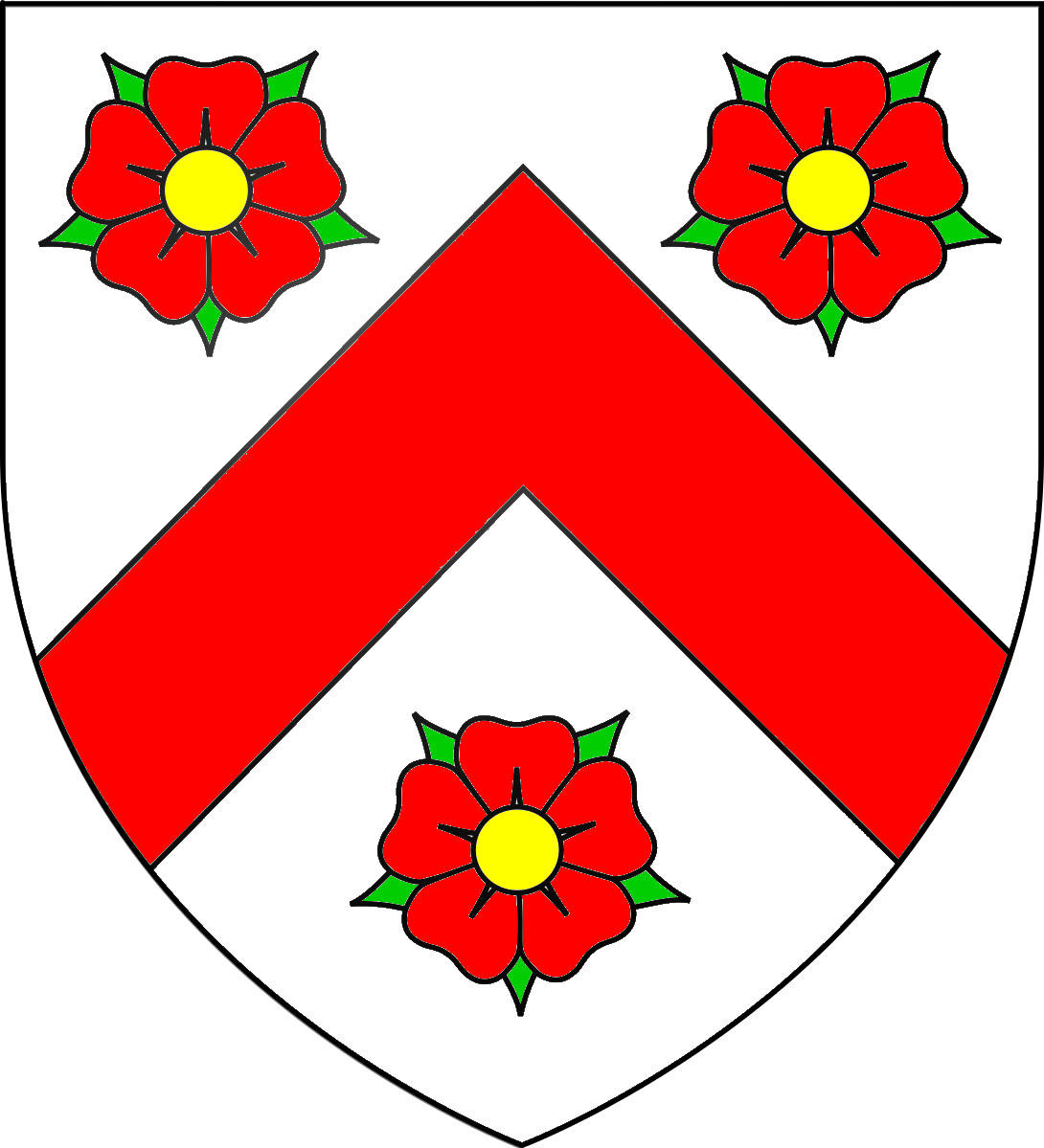
Arms of Phelips: Argent, a chevron gules between three roses of the second seeded or barbed vert

Robert Phelips (1 February 1619 – 21 June 1707) was a Royalist officer during the English Civil War. After the Restoration he was a Member of Parliament, and from 25 May 1687 until 21 March 1689 Chancellor of the Duchy of Lancaster.

== Early life ==
Phelips was the second son of Sir Robert Phelips of Montacute House and his wife Bridget Gorges, daughter of Sir Thomas Gorges of Longford, Wiltshire. He was educated at Wadham College, Oxford, from 1634 to 1637 and entered Inner Temple in 1637.

== Civil War and Interregnum ==
Like his elder brother Edward Phelips, Phelips became an officer in the Royalist army during the English Civil War. He was a colonel of horse in the Royalist army from 1643. He was present at the siege of Wardour Castle in late 1643 where he was opposed by his friend Edmund Ludlow. In 1645 he was captured at Bridgwater, Somerset. He held little property and was not brought before the committee for compounding. In 1649 he was one of the leaders of the western association, and helped Charles II to escape after the Battle of Worcester.

In 1653 he planned to support a royalist invasion by capturing a seaport to be used as a beachhead, but was arrested. He escaped and went abroad to the Court in exile, revisiting England once in disguise. He was appointed groom of the bedchamber to the Duke of Gloucester in 1656 until the Duke's death in 1660.

== Post Restoration ==
Phelips became a Freeman of Portsmouth in April 1660 and was warden of Salcey Forest, Northamptonshire from July to August 1660. He became groom of the bedchamber to King Charles in 1661 with a salary of £500 a year. Also in 1661, he was called to the bar and was elected Member of Parliament for Stockbridge in the Cavalier Parliament. He was a commissioner for assessment for Surrey from 1661 to 1664 and for Wiltshire from 1661 to 1669, and a commissioner for loyal and indigent officers for London, Westminster and Somerset in 1662. He became involved with Samuel Sandys' fenland reclamation and was commissioner for sewers for the Bedford level from 1662 to 1663 and conservator for the Bedford level from 1663 to 1665, from 1666 to 1667 and from 1669 to 1670, In 1671 he was commissioner for encroachments at Windsor. He was elected MP for Andover in 1685. From 1685 to 1687 he was privy seal and commissioner for the great wardrobe. He was Chancellor of the Duchy of Lancaster from 25 May 1687 until 21 March 1689.

Phelips died at the age of 88 and was buried in Bath Abbey.

== Family ==
Phelips married his cousin Agneta Gorges, daughter of Sir Robert Gorges of Redlynch, sometime before 1653. They had two sons and three daughters.

== Notes ==
Parliament of England
Preceded by Sir John Evelyn; Francis Rivett	Member of Parliament for Stockbridge; 1661 – 1679; With: Sir Robert Howard	Succeeded by Henry Whithed; Oliver St John
Political offices
Preceded by In commission	Chancellor of the Duchy of Lancaster; 1687–1689	Succeeded by The Lord Willoughby de Eresby
