= William Paulet, 4th Marquess of Winchester =

English Marquess

William Paulet
- Marquess of Winchester; Baron St. John
- Arms of Paulet, Marquess of Winchester: Sable, three swords pilewise points in base proper pomels and hilts or
- Born: Before 1560
- Died: 4 February 1629 (aged 68–69)
- Buried: St. Mary's Church, Basing, Hampshire; 51.271389°N 1.046667°W
- Noble family: Paulet
- Spouse: Lucy Cecil
- Issue: William Paulet; Thomas Paulet; John Paulet, 5th Marquess of Winchester; Henry Paulet; Charles Paulet; Edward
- Father: William Paulet, 3rd Marquess of Winchester
- Mother: Anne Howard

William Paulet, 4th Marquess of Winchester (bef. 1560 – 4 February 1629) was an English nobleman, the son of William Paulet, 3rd Marquess of Winchester and Anne or Agnes Howard. He was styled Lord St. John from 1576 to 1598. He was summoned to Parliament on 16 January 1581 in his father's barony as Lord St. John of Basing. On 24 November 1598, he succeeded his father as 4th Marquess of Winchester. Paulet experienced great financial difficulties arising from his magnificent style of living and his lavish entertainment of Elizabeth I at Basing House.

== Marriage and issue ==
On 28 February 1587 at St Martin-in-the-Fields, he married Lady Lucy Cecil, daughter of Sir Thomas Cecil, 1st Earl of Exeter and his first wife, Dorothy Neville. Lucy and William had six children:

- William Paulet, Lord St John (1587/8–1621), married Mary Browne, daughter of Anthony-Maria Browne, 2nd Viscount Montagu
- Thomas Paulet, died before 1621
- John Paulet, 5th Marquess of Winchester (c.1598–5 March 1675) married three times:
  - Jane Savage, daughter of Thomas Savage, 1st Viscount Savage
  - Honora de Burgh, daughter of Richard Burke, 4th Earl of Clanricarde
  - Isabel Howard, daughter of William Howard, 1st Viscount Stafford and Mary Stafford
- Lord Henry Paulet, of Amport, married Lucy Philpot, daughter of Sir George Philpot of Thruxton
- Charles Paulet, died c.1654, had issue
- Edward Paulet

His wife, Lucy, was treated for cancer in 1614 by the court physician Théodore de Mayerne. She died 1 October 1614 and was buried a month later in the Cecil vault in Westminster Abbey.

== Death ==
William Paulet died at Hackwood, near Basingstoke, on 4 February 1629, and was buried at Basing, Hampshire.

== Sources ==
- Cokayne, G. E. (1898). Complete Peerage of England, Scotland, Ireland, Great Britain and the United Kingdom, Extant, Extinct or Dormant, vol. VIII. Exeter: William Pollard. p. 174.
- Goodwin, Gordon (1895). "Paulet, John". In Lee, Sidney (ed.). Dictionary of National Biography. Vol. 44. London: Smith, Elder & Co. pp. 90–92.
- Lodge, Edmund (1859). The Genealogy of the Existing British Peerage and Baronetage: Containing the Family Histories of the Nobility. London: Hurst and Blackett. p. 580.
- "William Paulet, Marquess of Winchester". Family Search: Community Trees. The Church of Jesus Christ of Latter-day Saints. Archived from the original on 2013-12-20.
- "William Paulett, 4th Marquess of Winchester". The Peerage. Thepeerage.com.
- "Winchester, Marquess of (E, 1551)". Cracroft's Peerage. Archived from the original on 2013-11-13.

Peerage of England
Preceded by William Paulet	Marquess of Winchester; 1598–1628	Succeeded by John Paulet
Preceded by William Paulet	Baron St John of Basing (descended by acceleration); 1598–1624	Succeeded by John Paulet
