= George Philpot =

English landowner, courtier and patron of musicians

Sir George Philpot

Sheriff of Hampshire
- In office 1621–1622
- Monarch: James I

Personal details
- Died: 1624
- Occupation: Landowner, courtier
- Known for: Patronage of Thomas Weelkes

George Philpot or Philpott (died 1624) was an English landowner, courtier, and patron of musicians.

Philpot's home was at Thruxton, Hampshire. Philpot was a patron of the composer Thomas Weelkes. He donated a bell to the parish church of St Peter and Paul in 1600.

King James and Anne of Denmark stayed with the Philpots at Thruxton in August 1603. They were travelling from Farnham Castle to Wilton House, and went next to Sir Richard Gifford's house at King's Somborne. At Thruxton again on 28 August 1607, Anne of Denmark rewarded George Philpot's musicians with 20 shillings, and then visited Lady Mason.

Philpot was Sheriff of Hampshire in 1621.

== Marriage and family ==
Philpot was twice married, his children included:

- John Philpot
- Thomas Philpot
- Catherine Philpot
- Anne Philpot, who married John Paynter
- Alice Philpot
- Mary Philpot, who married Mr Cheney
- Barbara Philpot, who married Mr Eccles
- Lucy Philpot, who married Lord Henry Paulet, a son of William Paulet, 4th Marquess of Winchester and Lucy Cecil.
- Frances Philpot, who married Thomas Caesar, a son of Julius Caesar (judge).
