= Thomas Cole (died 1681) =

English politician

Thomas Cole JP DL (1622–1681) was an English politician who sat in the House of Commons in 1656 and 1660.

Cole was the son of Thomas Cole of Liss and his wife Mary Waller, daughter of Thomas Waller of Beaconsfield, Buckinghamshire. He was baptised on 15 January 1622. He entered Gray's Inn in 1641.

Cole was commissioner for execution of ordinances for Hampshire in 1645 and commissioner for assessment for Hampshire from 1647 to 1652. In 1648 he was commissioner for militia for Hampshire and was a JP for Hampshire by 1650. He was commissioner for security for Hampshire from 1655 to 1656. In 1656, Cole was elected Member of Parliament for Hampshire in the Second Protectorate Parliament. He was commissioner for assessment for Hampshire in 1657 and commissioner for militia in 1659 and 1660. In January 1660 he was commissioner for assessment for Hampshire and by April 1660 he was freeman of Portsmouth and Winchester. In April 1660 he was elected MP for Petersfield and Winchester and may not have resolved his preference by the time parliament was dissolved.

Cole became captain of militia for Hampshire in November 1660 and was reinstated as JP for Hampshire in 1662. Following his second marriage, he lived mainly in Northamptonshire and was commissioner for assessment for Northamptonshire in 1663. He was High Sheriff of Hampshire in 1663 and became Deputy Lieutenant in 1667. In 1670 he became JP for Northamptonshire.

Cole died at the age of 58 and was buried at Liss on 4 March 1681.

Cole married firstly Elizabeth Harvey, daughter of Sir Stephen Harvey of Colchester End, Hardingstone Northamptonshire in December 1651. There were no children and after her death in 1659 he married secondly Judith Tryon, widow of Peter Tryon of Bulwick, Northamptonshire and daughter of Abraham Cullen, merchant, of Great St. Helens, London by licence on 23 April 1662. They had a son and daughter.

Parliament of England
Preceded by Richard Lord Cromwell; Richard Norton; Richard Major; John St Barbe; Robert Wallop; Francis Rivett; Edward Hooper; John Bulkeley	Member of Parliament for Hampshire; 1656; With: Richard Lord Cromwell; William Goffe; Robert Wallop; Richard Norton; John Bulkeley; Edward Hooper; Richard Cobb	Succeeded by Robert Wallop; Richard Norton
