= Roger Burgoyne =

Roger Burgoyne is the name of three Burgoyne baronets of Sutton:

- Sir Roger Burgoyne, 2nd Baronet (1618–1677), Member of Parliament for Bedfordshire
- Sir Roger Burgoyne, 4th Baronet (died 1716)
- Sir Roger Burgoyne, 6th Baronet (1710–1780), Member of Parliament for Bedfordshire

== See also ==
- Burgoyne (surname)
