= Henry Whithed =

English soldier and politician

Henry Whithed (c. 1629–1684) was an English soldier and politician who sat in the House of Commons at various times between 1660 and 1680.

== Early life and career ==
Whithed was the eldest son of Richard Whithed of Norman Court, West Tytherley, Hampshire and his first wife Margery Culliford, daughter of John Culliford of Encombe, Dorset. He was a student of Inner Temple in 1646. From 1646 to 1662, he was freeman of Lymington. He was commissioner for assessment for Hampshire in 1657 and from January 1660 to 1680. In March 1660 he was commissioner for militia and became J.P. for Hampshire until 1670. He was a freeman of Portsmouth and Winchester by April 1660.

In April 1660, Whithed was elected Member of Parliament for Portsmouth for the Convention Parliament. He was captain of militia horse in Hampshire in April 1660. In 1661, he stood for Stockbridge, but was involved in a double return, which was decided in favour of Robert Phelips. He succeeded his father in 1663. He served in the army during the second Dutch war in 1667 as a lieutenant colonel in Richard Norton's Foot. He was removed from the commission of the peace in 1670 when the Conventicles Act was passed as he was sympathetic to dissenters. He was commissioner for wastes and spoils for the New Forest from 1672 to 1673. He became J.P. for Hampshire again by 1673, for Andover in 1674 and for Dorset and Wiltshire in 1675. In 1675 he was commissioner for recusants for Hampshire. In 1676 he was removed from the commission of the peace again at the instance of the bishop of London. He was Sheriff of Hampshire from 1677 to 1678. In February 1679 he was elected MP for in the First Exclusion Parliament. He was defeated at Stockbridge in the second election but was seated on petition in 1680. He was commissioner for wastes and spoils for the New Forest in 1679.

Whithed died between July 1684 when he drew up his will and 2 December 1684 when it was proved.

Whithed married twice: firstly Sarah Norton daughter of Richard Norton of Southwick Park, Hampshire in about 1654 and had a son and two daughters. He married secondly on 11 September 1665, Anne Jones, widow of Richard Jones of Welford, Berkshire and daughter of Robert Mason, recorder of London. He was the brother of Richard Whithed who was also an MP.

Parliament of England
Preceded by Not represented in Restored Rump	Member of Parliament for Portsmouth; 1660; With: Richard Norton; Andrew Henley	Succeeded by Richard Norton; Sir George Carteret, 1st Baronet
Preceded by Sir Robert Howard; Robert Phelips	Member of Parliament for Stockbridge; 1679–1680; With: Oliver St John	Succeeded by Oliver St John; William Strode
Preceded by Oliver St John; William Strode	Member of Parliament for Stockbridge; 1660; With: Oliver St John	Succeeded by Oliver St John; Essex Strode
