= John Bulkeley (MP) =

English politician

John Bulkeley (11 November 1614 – September 1662) was an English politician who sat in the House of Commons at various times between 1640 and 1662.

Bulkeley was the son of William Bulkeley of Burgate, Hampshire, and his wife Margaret Culliford, daughter of John Culliford of Encombe, Dorset. He matriculated at Hart Hall, Oxford, on 13 April 1632, aged 18. He was a student of the Middle Temple in 1633. He travelled abroad in France from 1634 to 1637.

In April 1640, Bulkeley was elected Member of Parliament for Yarmouth (Isle of Wight) in the Short Parliament. He was elected to the Long Parliament in November 1645 as MP for Newtown until he was excluded under Pride's Purge.

Bulkeley was elected MP for Hampshire in 1654 for the First Protectorate Parliament and was re-elected for Hampshire in 1656 for the Second Protectorate Parliament. In 1659 he was elected MP for in the Third Protectorate Parliament and in 1660 was chosen again for Hampshire in the Convention Parliament. He was lastly elected MP for Lymington in the Cavalier Parliament and sat until his death in 1662.

Bulkeley died at the age of 47.

Bulkeley married firstly by licence dated 4 January 1638, Anne Doddington, daughter of Sir William Doddington of Breamore, Hampshire and had two daughters. He married secondly after settlement dated June 1646, Elizabeth Trenchard widow of Francis Trenchard of Cutteridge, Wiltshire and daughter of William Sotwell of Greenham, Berkshire. She died in March 1651 and he married thirdly after settlement dated 1652, Penelope Trenchard, daughter of Sir Thomas Trenchard of Wolverton, Dorset, and had three sons.

Parliament of England
Vacant Parliament suspended since 1629	Member of Parliament for Yarmouth (Isle of Wight); 1640; With: Viscount L'Isle; William Oglander	Succeeded by Viscount L'Isle; Sir John Leigh
Preceded by Sir John Barrington, 3rd Baronet; John Meux	Member of Parliament for Newtown; 1645–1648; With: Sir John Barrington, 3rd Baronet	Succeeded by William Stevens
Preceded by Richard Norton; Richard Major; John Hildesley	Member of Parliament for Hampshire; 1654–1656; With: Richard Lord Cromwell 1654–1656; Robert Wallop 1654–1656; Richard Norton 1654–1656; Edward Hooper 1654–1656; Richard Major 1654; John St Barbe 1654; Francis Rivett 1654; Thomas Cole 1656; William Goffe 1656; Richard Cobb 1656	Succeeded by Robert Wallop; Richard Norton
Preceded by Not represented	Member of Parliament for Christchurch; 1659; With: Henry Tulse	Succeeded by Restored Rump
Preceded by Richard Norton	Member of Parliament for Hampshire; 1660; With: Richard Norton	Succeeded by Lord St John; Sir John Norton, Bt
Preceded by John Button; Henry Bromfield	Member of Parliament for Lymington; 1661–1662; With: Sir William Lewis, 1st Baronet	Succeeded by Sir William Lewis, 1st Baronet; Sir Nicholas Steward, 1st Baronet
