= Sir Humphrey Monoux, 4th Baronet =

British landowner and Tory politician

Sir Humphrey Monoux, 4th Baronet (c. 1702–1757) of Wootton House, Bedfordshire, was a British landowner and Tory politician who sat in the House of Commons from 1728 to 1741

Monoux was the only son of Sir Philip Monoux, 3rd Baronet, MP, and his wife Dorothy Harvey, daughter of William Harvey of Chigwell, Essex. He succeeded his father to the baronetcy on 25 November 1707. He matriculated at Trinity College, Oxford on 19 February 1720, aged 17 and was created MA on 3 May 1723.

At the 1727 British general election. Monoux stood as a Tory in a contest for Bedfordshire, and was defeated. He was returned at a by-election on 24 February 1728 as Member of Parliament for Tavistock, by his neighbour, Wriothesley Russell, 3rd Duke of Bedford. He voted consistently against the Government. At the 1734 British general election, he was returned by the Duke of Marlborough for Stockbridge apparently in exchange for providing his electoral interest at Bedfordshire for the Duke's brother John Spencer. Monoux continued to vote against the Government and did not stand again at the 1741 British general election,

Monoux married Jane Elizabeth Jones, widow of Charles Wake Jones of Waltham Abbey, Essex, and daughter of Sir Samuel Vanacker Sambrooke, 3rd Baronet on 11 December 1742. He died without issue on 3 December 1757, and was succeeded by his cousin Philip Monoux, who was descended from the first baronet's second son.

Parliament of Great Britain
Preceded by Sir John Cope, Bt; Sir Francis Henry Drake, Bt	Member of Parliament for Tavistock; 1728–1734; With: Sir Francis Henry Drake, Bt	Succeeded by Hon. Charles Fane; Sidney Meadows
Preceded by John Chetwynd; Martin Bladen	Member of Parliament for Stockbridge; 1734–1741; With: John Montagu; John Berkeley	Succeeded by Charles Churchill; Matthew Lamb
Baronetage of England
Preceded by Philip Monoux	Baronet (of Wootton); 1707–1757	Succeeded by Philip Monoux
