= Charles Churchill (of Chalfont) =

British Member of Parliament

Charles Churchill (ca. 1720–1812) was a British Member of Parliament.

He was the only son of Lieutenant-General Charles Churchill by the actress Anne Oldfield. His grandfather, also Charles Churchill, was a British army officer and brother of the 1st Duke of Marlborough.

At the 1741 general election he was returned to the House of Commons as a Member of Parliament (MP) for the borough of Stockbridge in Hampshire, and held the seat until the next election, in 1747. At the 1747 election he was returned as an MP for Milborne Port, but it was a double return and Churchill was not one of those seated. At the 1754 general election he was elected as an MP for Great Marlow in Buckinghamshire, and held that seat until the next election, in 1761.

He married Lady Maria Walpole, daughter of Robert Walpole. Their daughter Mary became the second wife of Charles Cadogan, 1st Earl Cadogan, and had issue. Their daughter Sophia became the wife of Horatio Walpole, 2nd Earl of Orford, also had issue.

Parliament of Great Britain
Preceded by Sir Humphrey Monoux, Bt; John Berkeley	Member of Parliament for Stockbridge; 1741–1747; With: Matthew Lamb	Succeeded by Daniel Boone; William Chetwynd
Preceded by Merrick Burrell; William Ockenden	Member of Parliament for Great Marlow; 1754–1761; With: Daniel Moore	Succeeded by William Clayton; William Mathew Burt
