= Lord Henry Paulet (courtier) =

English courtier

Lord Henry Paulet (1602–1672) was an English courtier who sat briefly in the House of Commons in the 2nd Parliament of Charles I, from February to June 1626.

Paulet was a son of William Paulet, 4th Marquess of Winchester. On 6 March 1618, he was admitted to Peterhouse, Cambridge. He was created Knight of the Bath at the Coronation of Charles I and was of Amport, Hampshire. In 1626, he was elected as one of the two members of parliament for Andover.

Paulet married Lucy Philpot, a daughter of Sir George Philpot. Their son Francis was the grandfather of the twelfth Marquess of Winchester.

Parliament of England
Preceded by Sir Henry Wallop; Henry Shuter	Member of Parliament for Andover; 1626; With: John Shuter	Succeeded by Robert Wallop; Ralph Conway
