= Henry Gifford (MP) =

16th-century English politician

Henry Gifford (died 1592), of King's Somborne, Hampshire, was an English member (MP) of the parliament of England for Stockbridge in 1572.

== Family ==
He married Susan Brouncker, a daughter of Henry Brouncker of Erlestoke, Wiltshire. Their children included:

- John Gifford (d. 1597)
- Richard Gifford (1577–1643)
- Bridget Gifford, married Mr Powlett.

Henry Gifford's sister, Katherine (d. 1599), married Sir Henry Wallop.
