= Thruxton, Hampshire =

Village and parish in Hampshire, England

Coordinates: 51.2079°N 1.5833°W

Thruxton
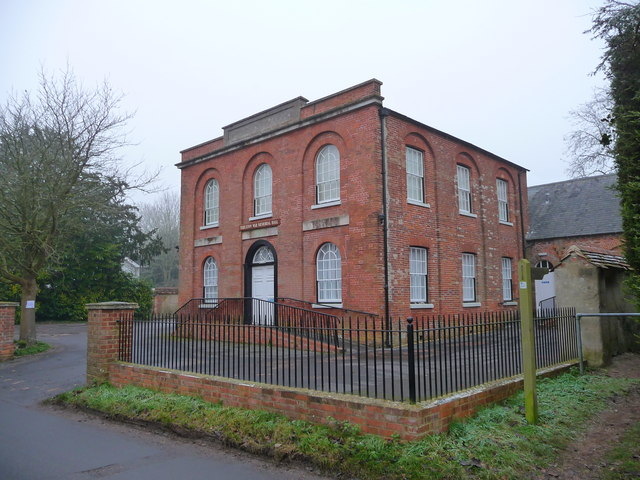
- Thruxton Memorial Hall

- Location within Hampshire
- Population: 650 (2011 Census)
- OS grid reference: SU292455
- District: Test Valley
- Shire county: Hampshire
- Region: South East
- Country: England
- Sovereign state: United Kingdom
- Post town: ANDOVER
- Postcode district: SP11
- Dialling code: 01264
- Police: Hampshire and Isle of Wight
- Fire: Hampshire and Isle of Wight
- Ambulance: South Central
- UK Parliament: North West Hampshire

Thruxton is just off the A303 road five miles (8.0 km) west of Andover. It is a village with a Manor House, thatched cottages and village green. Pillhill Brook runs from Thruxton Down through the grounds of the Manor House and along the village street to Mullen's Pond, a natural habitat for many species of migratory birds and wild plants.

== History ==
Thruxton was almost certainly one of four ‘Annes’ named in the Domesday Book under the Andover Hundred. In the twelfth century the name was Turkilleston (Turkil being a Saxon name and ‘tun’ being the Saxon word for farmstead and later hamlet, or village - so Turkils or Thurcols Homestead ) which, over the centuries, changed via Turcleston, Thorcleston (13th century), Throkeleston, Thurkcleston (14th century), Throkeston (15th century), Thruckleston (16th century), Throxton (18th century) to the present form.

A Roman building considered to be a temple or a basilican villa was unearthed near the village in 1823, which contained a mosaic depicting Bacchus seated on a tiger. The tessellated pavement was acquired for the British Museum in 1899.

The manor was held in 1086 by Gozelin de Cormeilles; in 1304, his descendant, John de Cormeilles, was granted the right to hold a market every Monday and a fair on the eve of the feast of St Peter and St Paul (the saints the village church is dedicated to).

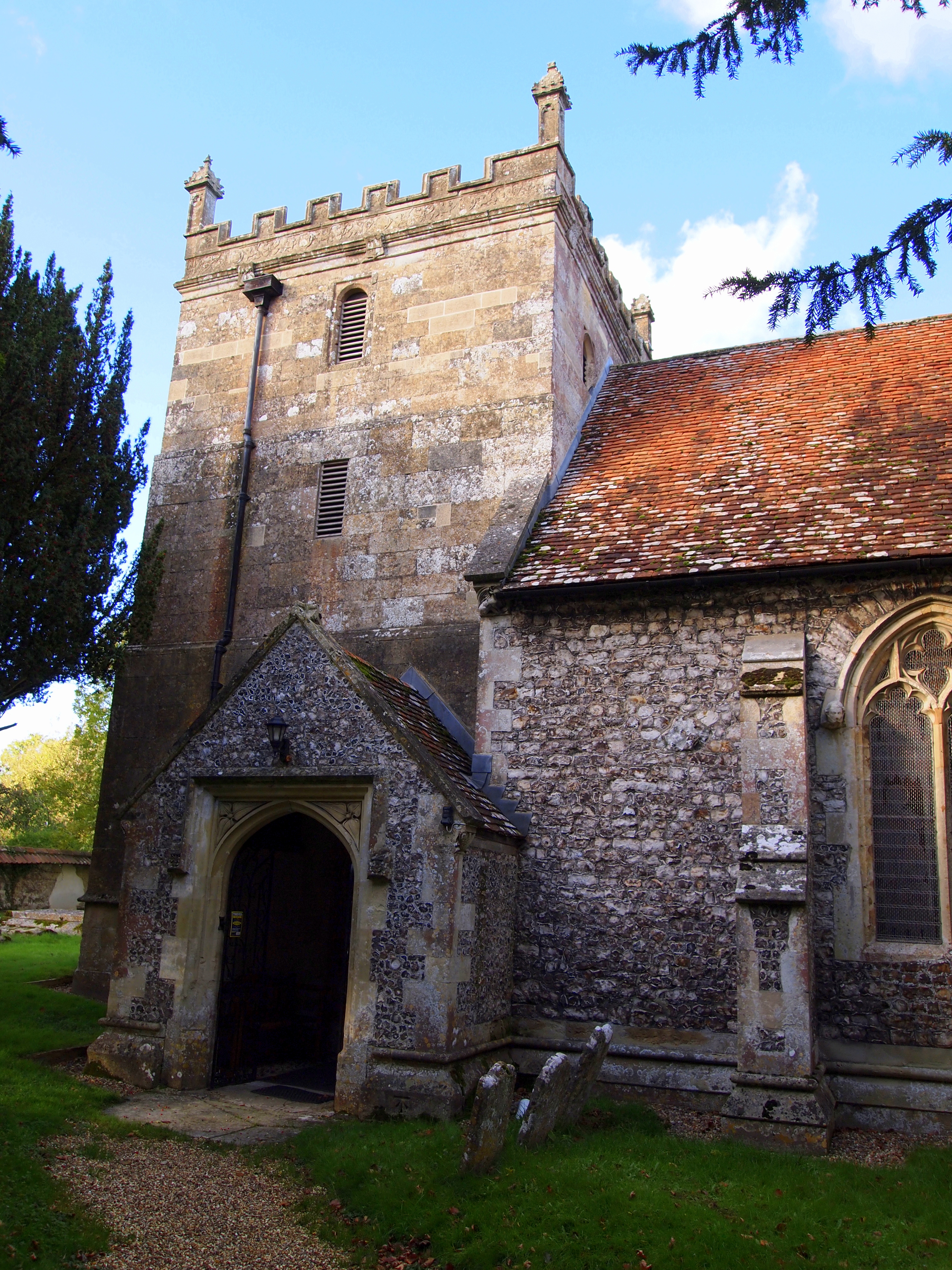
St Peter and St Paul's church

Parts of the parish church of St Peter and St Paul's date from the thirteenth century and contain the tombs of three knights.

Two coffin slabs for two of the knights stand upright at the entrance in the bell tower. Made of Purbeck marble, they are heavily weathered, although the great helm and shield of one is still discernible. His spear lies beside him on his right side.

Just when the de Cormeilles family parted with the manor of Thruxton and how the Lisles acquired it is unknown. Sir John Lisle and his wife are buried in the church, with Sir John commemorated with an outstanding example of an early 15th-century monumental brass. The brass is dated 1407 and is the earliest known example of a knight in full plate armour in the country.

Further generations of Lisle family were buried in the church, although space was becoming restricted by the time of Sir John Lisle in the early 1520s. He decided to build a chapel to provide further room for future burials, including his own.

Sir John died in 1524, followed shortly by his wife, Mary. Their tomb is considered a classic of the early English Renaissance style and can be seen to the left of the altar. The effigies are made from Purbeck marble. Sir John lies with his bare head on his shield, wearing full plate armour and chain collar of linked "S"s. The work was possibly by Thomas Bertie, a master mason whose work is evident in Winchester Cathedral.

The bulk of the Lisle chapel is gone. Most of it was used to provide building material when the church tower collapsed in 1796 and had to be rebuilt. The Lisle line of direct male heirs died out soon after Sir John and Mary, with the manorial rights passing to Agnes, married to John Philpot. Behind the choir pews on the left of the altar is a weathered wooden effigy from the early 17th century, believed to be of Elizabeth Philpot who died in 1616.

The church experienced a number of renovations and rebuilding work between 1839 and 1877, including the construction of the north aisle. The nave also contains a list of the church's rectors dating back to 1243.

King James and Anne of Denmark stayed with George Philpot at Thruxton in August 1603. They were travelling from Farnham Castle to Wilton House, and went next to Sir Richard Gifford's house at King's Somborne. At Thruxton again on 28 August 1607, Anne of Denmark rewarded Sir George Philpot's musicians with 20 shillings.

The road through Thruxton was well travelled and used by coaches on the Exeter-London route. In the 1720s a highwayman from Salisbury, John Dyer, would set ambushes on Thruxton Down to hold up coaches. He was captured and hung in London in 1729.

On 24 April 1920, Sidney Spicer, a taxi driver, was hailed in Amesbury by Percy Toplis, a criminal and black marketeer who was then serving in the Royal Army Service Corps. The vehicle was travelling towards Andover, but Topliss shot Spicer in the back once they reached Thruxton Down. The driver was killed instantly, with Toplis hiding the body and then stealing the vehicle. The body was found the following morning, with Toplis already on the run. He would be shot dead by police in Cumberland in June after a lengthy manhunt.

The toll house for the Andover to Amesbury turnpike road at Mullen's Pond was demolished in 1965.

== Race track ==
Thruxton Circuit is a major draw for visitors to the area and can claim to be the UK's fastest race circuit. Currently the track plays host to a variety of high-profile car and motorbike championships, including the British Superbike and British Touring Car Championships, as well as truck racing. The circuit is located on the site of the former aircraft base.

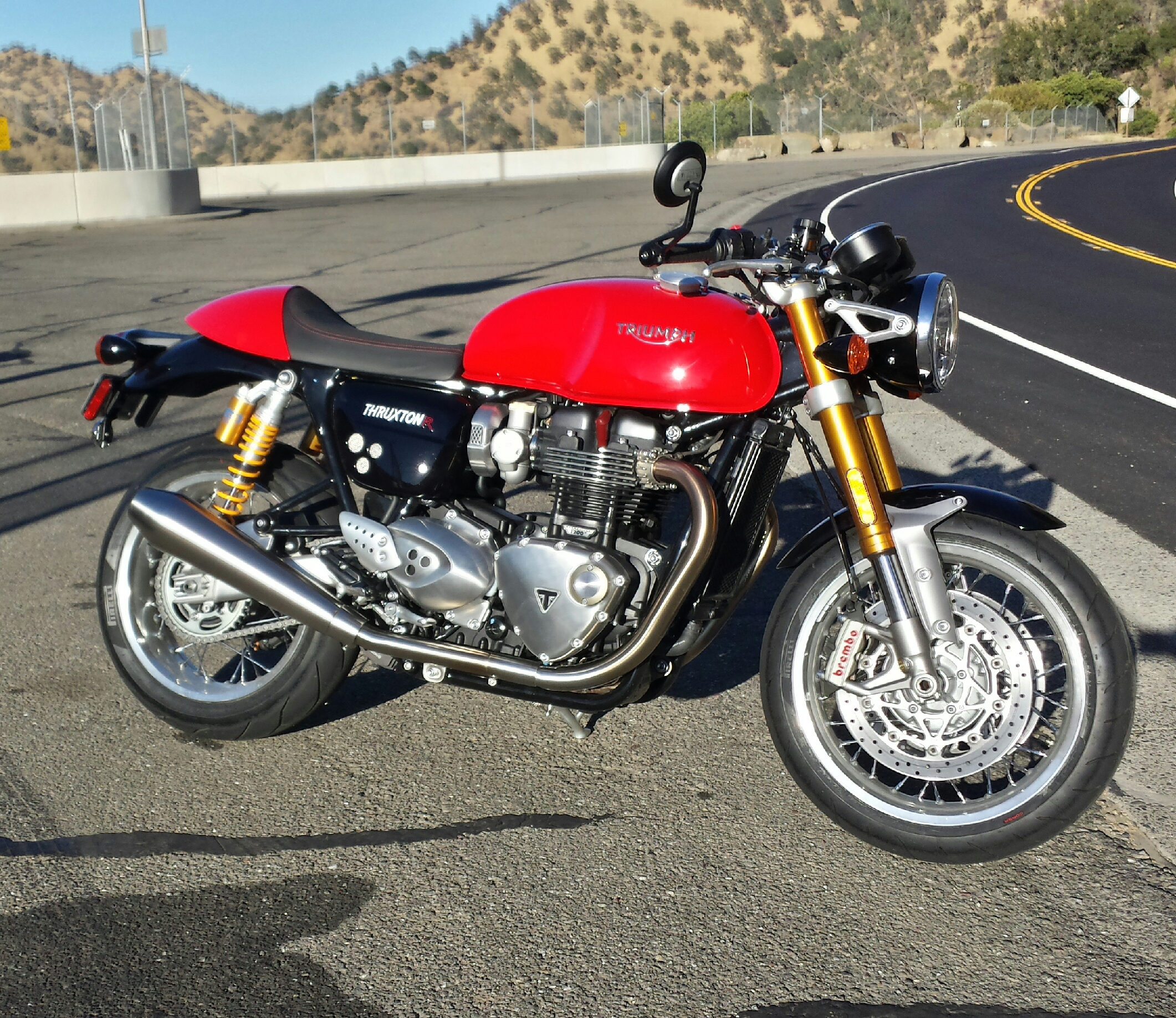
Diablo Red 2016 Triumph Thruxton R at Monticello Dam in California

The Velocette Thruxton and Triumph Thruxton motorbikes are named after the circuit. The Velocette Thruxton was based on the Velocette Venom which was the first production bike to average over 100 mph for 24 hours. There are several variants of the Triumph, the initial model called the Thruxton Bonneville. The Thruxton 1200 and Thruxton 1200 R are the latest models.

== Airfield ==
Land for the airfield was purchased by the Air Ministry from Thruxton Manor Estate. It was bombed during construction, with damage to one property in Thruxton village and other bombs missing the target, hitting Thruxton Down.

The airfield was officially opened as a satellite of nearby RAF Andover airfield on 1 August 1941. It became a base under Army Co-Op Command's auspices and hosted Lysanders of 225 Squadron. They were used for air/sea rescue work. A detachment from 42 OTU also used the airfield.

By February 1942, 298 Squadron Whitley bombers converted for paratroop transport landed in preparation for Operation Biting, the famous Bruneval raid, which successfully targeted a Würzburg radar system and took place on 27/28 February 1942. In May 1942, 225 Squadron converted to Mustangs and left Thruxton.

298 Squadron was formed in Thruxton in August 1942, equipped with Whitleys. The unit was used for paratroop exercises by day and leaflet dropping at night. It converted to Albermale aircraft in 1943 and departed for Stoney Cross in August that year. During 1942/43 the airfield was utilised by many different RAF squadrons, including No.s 168, 170 and 268 Squadrons in Autumn 1943.

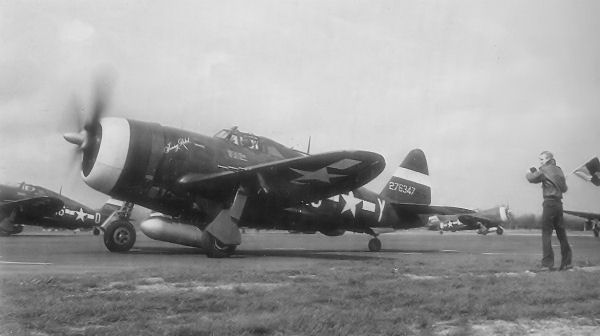
"Jenny Rebel", Republic P-47D-15-RE Thunderbolt 42-76347 of 389th Fighter Squadron shown taking off on runway 26 from RAF Thruxton airfield, 1944

The USAAF arrived in early 1944, with 366th Fighter Group taking control of the airfield on 1 March 1944. The unit flew P-47 Thunderbolts and was under the command of Col. Dyke F Meyer. It comprised three fighter squadrons: 389th, 390th and 391st. Their task in the build-up to D-Day was interdiction and the ground bombing/strafing of German targets in northern France. The Group left for France towards the end of June.

The airfield was then used by smaller units until the war's end, when operations ceased.

Civilian flight training started at Thruxton Aerodrome in 1947 when the airfield was taken over by the Wiltshire School of Flying until 1967. Western Air then took on the mantle of training people to fly, and even today their instructors are teaching some of the local military the delights of flying light aircraft. For some years it was also the home of Thruxton Gliding Club.

The airfield is the base of the Hampshire & Isle of Wight Air Ambulance, since its founding in 2007.

== Public houses ==
There is one village pub; the White Horse, a fifteenth-century thatched pub at Mullens Pond south of the A303. The one time George Inn, a former coaching inn is now a private house George House. Built in the late 18th or early 19th century, it is believed to have replaced and taken the name of the older inn opposite dating from the seventeenth century, now known as George Cottage, near the centre of the village.
