= John Montagu (died 1734) =

English soldier and Member of Parliament

John Montagu (after 1692 – 2 September 1734) was an English soldier and Member of Parliament.

John Montagu was born after 1692, the second son of Charles Montagu and Sarah Rogers. He became a captain in Vesey's foot regiment in 1716, captain and Lieutenant colonel in the 1st Foot Guards in 1718, and Lieutenant colonel of the 18th Foot in 1719. He was elected as Member of Parliament for Stockbridge in the general election of 1734, but died a few months later. He never married or had children.

Parliament of Great Britain
Preceded by John Chetwynd; Martin Bladen	Member of Parliament for Stockbridge; 1734; With: Sir Humphrey Monoux	Succeeded by Sir Humphrey Monoux; John Berkeley
