= John Berkeley, 5th Baron Berkeley of Stratton =

British politician

The Right Honourable The Lord Berkeley of Stratton PC
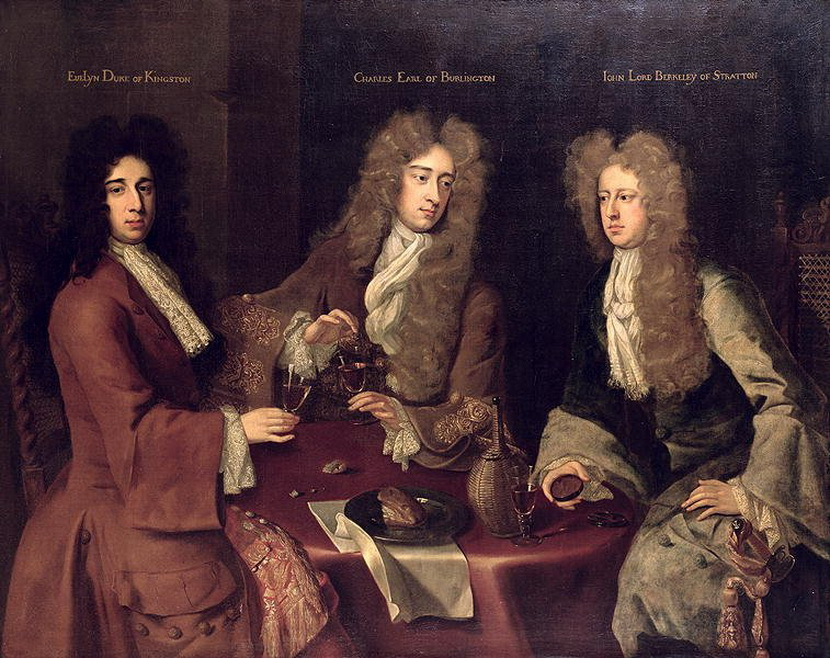
- A painting of the Earl of Burlington (centre) with Evelyn Pierrepont, (left) and John Berkeley(right)

Captain of the Honourable Corps of Gentlemen Pensioners
- In office 16 November 1756 – 12 July 1762
- Monarchs: George II; George III
- Prime Minister: The Duke of Devonshire; The Duke of Newcastle
- Preceded by: The Lord Hobart
- Succeeded by: The Earl of Lichfield

Personal details
- Born: 16 May 1697
- Died: 18 April 1773 (aged 75) Bruton Abbey, Bruton, Somerset
- Education: Christ Church, Oxford

John Berkeley, 5th Baron Berkeley of Stratton PC (16 May 1697 – 18 April 1773), styled The Honourable John Berkeley until 1741, was a British politician, the last of the Bruton branch of the Berkeley family.

== Background and education ==
Berkeley was the son of William Berkeley, 4th Baron Berkeley of Stratton, by Frances, daughter of Sir John Temple, Speaker of the Irish House of Commons. He was educated at Christ Church, Oxford.

== Political career ==
Berkeley was returned to parliament as one of two representatives for Stockbridge in 1735, a seat he held until 1741, when he succeeded his father in the barony and took his seat in the House of Lords. In 1743 he was appointed Captain of the Yeomen of the Guard, which he remained until 1746. He was sworn of the Privy Council in 1752 and served as Treasurer of the Household between 1755 and 1756 and Captain of the Honourable Corps of Gentlemen Pensioners between 1756 and 1762. From 1762 to 1770 he was Lord-Lieutenant of the Tower Hamlets and Constable of the Tower of London.

== Personal life ==
Lord Berkeley of Stratton was married but had no children. He died at a family home, Bruton Abbey, Somerset, in April 1773, aged 75, when the barony became extinct. He devised his grand estates which included Berkeley Square in London, to his kinsman the Frederick Augustus Berkeley, 5th Earl of Berkeley, his own branch descended in the male line from a Baron Berkeley who died in 1326, with some later shared female ancestry.

Parliament of Great Britain
Preceded by Sir Humphrey Monoux, Bt; John Montagu	Member of Parliament for Stockbridge; 1735–1741; With: Sir Humphrey Monoux, Bt	Succeeded by Charles Churchill; Matthew Lamb
Political offices
Preceded by The Earl of Essex	Captain of the Yeomen of the Guard; 1743–1746	Succeeded by The Viscount Torrington
Preceded by The Earl FitzWalter	Treasurer of the Household; 1755–1756	Succeeded by The Viscount Bateman
Preceded by The Lord Hobart	Captain of the Honourable Corps of Gentlemen Pensioners; 1756–1762	Succeeded by The Earl of Lichfield
Honorary titles
Preceded by The 1st Earl Cornwallis	Lord-Lieutenant of the Tower Hamlets; 1762–1770	Succeeded by The 2nd Earl Cornwallis
Preceded by The 1st Earl Cornwallis	Constable of the Tower of London; 1762–1770	Succeeded by The 2nd Earl Cornwallis
Peerage of England
Preceded by William Berkeley	Baron Berkeley of Stratton; 1741–1773	Extinct
