= John Evelyn (Parliamentarian) =

English politician

Sir John Evelyn (11 August 1601 – 26 June 1685) was an English politician who sat in the House of Commons variously between 1626 and 1660.

Evelyn was the son of George Evelyn of West Dean in Wiltshire, one of the Six Clerks in Chancery, and his wife Elizabeth Rivers, daughter of Sir John Rivers of Chafford, Kent. He was a cousin of the diarist John Evelyn, and nephew of another John Evelyn (1591–1664), of Godstone in Surrey, who sat as MP for nearby Bletchingley in 1628, 1640 and 1660.

In 1626, Evelyn was elected Member of Parliament for Wilton. He became a JP for Wiltshire in 1637. In April 1640, he was elected for Ludgershall in the Short Parliament, and was re-elected for Ludgershall in the Long Parliament in November 1640. He became a JP for Hampshire in 1641. He was a commissioner for Westminster Assembly, a commissioner for assessment for Wiltshire and a commissioner for levying of money in 1643. In 1645 he became a commissioner for the execution of ordinances in Hampshire, a commissioner for the New Model Army and then for the Admiralty. He was also commissioner for propositions for the relief of Ireland. In 1646 he was governor of the Covent Garden precinct and commissioner for abuses in heraldry and for exclusion from sacrament and for bishops' lands. In 1648 he was a member of the committee of both kingdoms. He abstained from the House of Commons after Pride's Purge.

In 1660 Evelyn was Councillor of State. He was re-elected at Ludgershall in 1660 for the Convention Parliament but this was a double return and he sat instead for Stockbridge.

Evelyn died at the age of 84 and left his estate to one daughter, the mother of Evelyn Pierrepont, while cutting Sarah, the other daughter, off with five shillings because of her marriage to George Saunderson, 5th Viscount Castleton.

Evelyn married Elizabeth Coxe, daughter of Robert Coxe, grocer of London. By her, Sir John had:

- Elizabeth Evelyn, who married Robert Pierrepont, by whom she had Evelyn Pierrepont, 1st Duke of Kingston-upon-Hull
- Sarah Evelyn, who married first Sir John Wray, 3rd Baronet, Thomas Fanshawe, 2nd Viscount Fanshawe second, and George Saunderson, 5th Viscount Castleton third.

Parliament of England
Preceded by Sir Thomas Morgan; Sir William Harrington	Member of Parliament for Wilton; 1626; With: Sir Thomas Morgan	Succeeded by Sir Thomas Morgan; John Pooley
Vacant Parliament suspended since 1629	Member of Parliament for Ludgershall; 1640–1648; With: William Ashburnham; Sir Walter Long, 1st Baronet	Not represented in Rump Parliament
Vacant Not represented in restored Rump	Member of Parliament for Ludgershall; 1660; With: William Prynne	Succeeded by Silius Titus; William Thomas
Vacant Not represented in restored Rump	Member of Parliament for Stockbridge; 1660; With: Francis Rivett	Succeeded by Robert Howard; Robert Phelips
