= Francis Rivett =

Francis Rivett (c 1596 – 6 April 1669) was an English landowner and politician who sat in the House of Commons at various times between 1654 and 1660.

Rivett was probably admitted at Emmanuel College, Cambridge on 29 May 1612 and awarded BA in 1616. In about 1649 Rivett purchased the estate of King's Somborne from Richard Gifford.

In 1654, Rivett was elected Member of Parliament for Hampshire in the First Protectorate Parliament. He was elected MP for Stockbridge in the Third Protectorate Parliament in 1659. In 1660, Rivett was elected MP for Stockbridge in the Convention Parliament.

Rivett's daughter Margery married Oliver St John of Farley Chamberlayne th whom the manor of King's Somborne passed.

Parliament of England
Preceded by Richard Norton; Richard Major; John Hildesley	Member of Parliament for Hampshire; 1654; With: Richard Lord Cromwell; Richard Norton; Richard Major; John St Barbe; Robert Wallop; Edward Hooper; John Bulkeley	Succeeded by Richard Lord Cromwell; William Goffe; Robert Wallop; Richard Norton; Thomas Cole; John Bulkeley; Edward Hooper; Richard Cobb
Preceded by Not represented Second Protectorate Parliament	Member of Parliament for Stockbridge; 1659; With: Richard Whitehead	Succeeded by Not represented in restored Rump
