= Stockbridge (constituency) =

Parliamentary constituency in the United Kingdom, 1801–1832

- Former borough constituency for the House of Commons

1563–1832
- Seats: Two

Stockbridge was a parliamentary borough in Hampshire, which elected two Members of Parliament (MPs) to the House of Commons from 1563 until 1832, when the borough was abolished by the Great Reform Act. It was one of the more egregiously rotten boroughs, and the first to have its status threatened for its corruption by a parliamentary bill to disfranchise it, though the proposal was defeated.

== History ==
=== Early years ===
The borough was first enfranchised during the reign of Elizabeth I, and consisted of the town of Stockbridge, a small Hampshire market town on the Great South-West Road that cannot have been a town of any real size or importance even at the outset. Although in Hampshire, in Tudor times the borough came within the jurisdiction of the Duchy of Lancaster, and it is possible that it won its right to vote on the assumption that it would allow the Duchy to nominate its members. However - and unlike most boroughs within the Duchy's sphere at that period - the historian John Neale found little evidence that most of early representatives were Duchy nominees: most were Hampshire men, and it may be that the influence of the local gentry was too strong. Nevertheless, towards the end of Queen Elizabeth's reign Stockbridge returned several MPs who were probably the choices of the Chancellor of the Duchy.

=== The election of 1614 ===
The system came to grief, however, at the election of 1614, causing a controversy that has been regarded as a significant milestone in the House Of Commons' assertion of its privileges. In that year, the Chancellor of the Duchy of Lancaster, Sir Thomas Parry, sent a threatening letter to the borough claiming the right by precedent to choose the two MPs, and nominating Sir Henry Wallop and Sir Walter Cope as his choices. But the intrepid 28 electors of Stockbridge ignored his wishes, voting almost unanimously for their own candidates, Sir Richard Gifford and a Mr St John. But the bailiff of the borough (who was ex-officio returning officer) ignored the vote and returned the names of Wallop and Cope as elected; furthermore, the angry Parry, furious to have been defied, had one of the voters arrested and imprisoned.

The electors now petitioned against this outcome, and the House of Commons proved strong enough to protect its elections from interference. Although there was considerable discussion as to the legal precedents, they eventually resolved that the election of Wallop and Cope was void. Furthermore, they expelled Parry from his own seat for subverting the election in another constituency, and prevailed upon the King to suspend him from his office and from the Privy Council.

=== 17th century attempts to disfranchise Stockbridge for corruption ===
It is not recorded whether the stand of the Stockbridge electors was based on principle or had some less worthy motive, but their successors were certainly more venal. At least from the late 17th century, the right to vote in Stockbridge was exercised by all inhabitant householders who paid scot and lot, which generally amounted to about 100 voters. Bribery was routine, and led to frequent scandal. In 1689 and again in 1693, the election in the borough was declared void. After the 1689 election was overturned by the Commons for "gross and notorious bribery", its original victor debarred from being re-elected for the constituency in that Parliament, and the bailiff and three other inhabitants of the town were thrown in jail. Then an unprecedented motion was put to disfranchise Stockbridge, and transfer its two seats to the county, but the other MPs - perhaps nervous as to their own position - proved unenthusiastic. After debate the proposal was quietly dropped.

In 1693, very unusually, the House went against the findings of its own election committee, declaring the election corrupt and void even though the committee had decided that the winner had been duly elected. Instead of issuing a writ for a new election, the House then considered a bill to disfranchise Stockbridge; this time the bill made considerable progress, but it was eventually defeated on the third reading and a by-election was held to fill the vacancy.

Not all the bribery in Stockbridge was as direct as buying votes or corrupting the bailiff. Thomas Oldfield, the 19th century historian of and polemicist against electoral abuse, records the following anecdote of the author Richard Steele, elected in 1713:

The ingenious Sir Richard Steele ... carried his election against a powerful opposition, by the merry expedient of sticking a large apple full of guineas, and declaring it should be the prize of that man whose wife should first be brought to-bed [i.e. have a baby] after that day nine months. This, we are told, procured him the interest of the women, who are said to commemorate Sir Richard's bounty to this day, and once made a strenuous effort to procure a resolution, that no man should ever be received as a candidate who did not offer himself upon the same terms.

=== Patronage in the 18th and 19th centuries ===
Yet despite the apparent need to secure every result by bribery, Stockbridge continued to have a generally recognised "patron", without whose support it was considered difficult if not impossible to be elected, and despite the precarious hold that this patronage entailed, it was as much a commercial property as the ownership of pocket boroughs where control of the elections was absolute. In 1754, the patron was the Attorney General, Robert Henley, who had personal rather than government-backed influence over the borough. He passed control to his colleague Henry Fox by leasing the rights for a term of years. Fox hoped to reduce the venality of the voters but quickly saw a deterioration rather than an improvement, and must have considered his payment to have been a poor investment. Namier and Brooke quote correspondence to show that in 1767 Fox's son, the Whig leader Charles James Fox, was admitting that while they felt certain of securing one seat for their chosen candidate at the following year's election they saw little likelihood of being able to choose both MPs: the 96 voters had already been bribed in advance to the extent of 50 guineas a man, and if the election was carried to a contest the need for further treating of the voters and payments to the returning officer would bring the cost to a candidate into the region of £2,500. (In the event this election was not contested, presumably because the votes bought in advance had already made it a foregone conclusion; but there were contests at each of the next four opportunities.)

By 1774 the younger Fox was in need of money and no longer able to afford the expense of maintaining control of Stockbridge's elections. Yet it seems that he was able to sell his interests there to the Luttrell family, a transaction that can in reality have entailed little more than a guarantee not to oppose the Luttrell candidates and so bid up the price of votes: lavish bribery by the Luttrells was still necessary to secure their seats. When the Luttrells tired of it, the borough passed into the hands of a West Indies merchant, Joseph Foster Barham, who occupied one seat himself and later kept the second for his step-grandson, John Foster Barham. But when he, too, found himself in monetary difficulties, he sold the borough to Earl Grosvenor. He not only vacated his seat immediately to allow Grosvenor's nominee (Edward Stanley, a future Conservative Prime Minister but then a Whig) to be elected, but took the trouble to introduce Stanley to the electors. By the time of the Reform Act, Grosvenor was being accused of having countered the prevalence of bribery by a different form of corruption, having hostile voters disqualified by persuading the local overseers of the poor (his appointees) not to rate them for scot and lot, and creating new votes by finding nominal jobs for "unemployables" with the surveyor of roads.

=== Abolition ===
By the 19th century, Stockbridge was no more than a village, and had no case for survival as a constituency even had its elections been impeccably pure. In 1831, the population of the borough was 663, and contained 188 houses. It was abolished as a separate constituency by the Great Reform Act in 1832, being included within the Northern Division of the county thereafter.

== Members of Parliament ==
=== MPs 1563–1640 ===
Parliament	First member	Second member
1563	Walter Sandys	William St John
1571	William St John	Tristram Pistor
1572	Henry Gifford	Tristram Pistor
1584	George Kingsmill	Hampden Paulet
1586	George Kingsmill	John Fisher
1588-1589	Chidiock Wardour	Henry St John
1593	John Awdeley	Henry St John
1597	Miles Sandys	Mark Steward
1601	Edward Savage	Thomas Grymes
1604-1611	Sir William Fortescue	Sir Edwin Sandys
1614	Sir Henry Wallop	Sir Walter Cope (Election voided)
1621-1622	Sir Richard Gifford	Sir William Ayloffe, 1st Baronet
1624	Sir Richard Gifford	Sir Henry Holcroft
1625	Sir Richard Gifford	Sir Thomas Badger
1626	Sir Richard Gifford	Sir Thomas Badger
1628	Sir Richard Gifford	Sir Henry Whitehead
1629–1640	No Parliaments summoned	

=== MPs 1640–1832 ===
Year	First member	First party	Second member	Second party
April 1640	William Heveningham	Parliamentarian	William Jephson	Parliamentarian
November 1640	William Heveningham	Parliamentarian	William Jephson	Parliamentarian
December 1648	William Heveningham	Parliamentarian	Jephson not recorded as sitting after Pride's Purge	
1653	Stockbridge was unrepresented in the Barebones Parliament and the First and Second Parliaments of the Protectorate			
January 1659	Francis Rivett		Richard Whitehead	
May 1659	Not represented in the restored Rump			
April 1660	Francis Rivett		Sir John Evelyn	
1661	Sir Robert Howard		Robert Phelips	
February 1679	Henry Whithed		Oliver St John	
August 1679	William Strode		Oliver St John	
1680	Henry Whithed		Oliver St John	
1681	Essex Strode		Oliver St John	
1685	Essex Strode		John Head	
January 1689	Richard Whithed		Oliver St John	
September 1689	Richard Whithed		William Montagu	
December 1689	Richard Whithed		Thomas Neale	
1690	Richard Whithed		William Montagu	
1691	Richard Whithed		Thomas Jervoise	
November 1693	Anthony Rowe		Thomas Jervoise	
December 1693	Seat vacant		Thomas Jervoise	
November 1694	George Pitt		Thomas Jervoise	
1695	Anthony Sturt		John Venables	
1698	Anthony Sturt		George Pitt	
1699	Anthony Sturt		John Pitt	Tory
1701	Frederick Tylney		Anthony Burnaby	
1702	Henry Killigrew		Anthony Burnaby	
1705	Sir John Hawles		Sir Edward Laurence	
1710	George Dashwood		The Earl of Barrymore	
1713	Thomas Brodrick		Richard Steele	Whig
1714	Thomas Brodrick		The Earl of Barrymore	
1715	Thomas Brodrick		Martin Bladen	
1722	John Chetwynd		Martin Bladen	
1734	Sir Humphrey Monoux		John Montagu	
1735	Sir Humphrey Monoux		John Berkeley	
1741	Charles Churchill		Matthew Lamb	
1747	Daniel Boone		William Chetwynd	
1754	John Gibbons		Dr George Hay	
1756	John Gibbons		The Viscount Powerscourt	
1761	George Prescott		Nicholas Linwood	
1768	Major-General Richard Alchorne Worge		Richard Fuller	
1772	James Hare		Richard Fuller	
1774	Captain the Hon. John Luttrell		The Lord Irnham	
1775	Lieutenant the Hon. James Luttrell		The Lord Irnham	
1780	Lieutenant the Hon. James Luttrell		Captain the Hon. John Luttrell	
1784	Thomas Boothby Parkyns		Captain the Hon. John Luttrell	
1785	Thomas Boothby Parkyns		James Gordon	
1790	John Cator		John Scott	
1793	Joseph Foster Barham	Whig	George Porter	Whig
1799	John Agnew		George Porter	Whig
1802	Joseph Foster Barham	Whig	George Porter	Whig
January 1807	Sir John Leicester, Bt		George Porter	Whig
May 1807	Joseph Foster Barham	Whig	George Porter	Whig
1820	Joseph Foster Barham	Whig	John Foster Barham	Whig
1822	Edward Stanley	Whig	John Foster Barham	Whig
1826	Thomas Grosvenor	Whig	George Wilbraham	Whig
1830	William Sloane-Stanley	Tory	George Wilbraham	Whig
1831	John Foster Barham	Whig	Sir Stratford Canning	Whig
1832	Constituency abolished			
