= Colewort Barracks =

Barracks in Portsmouth, Hampshire, England

- Portsmouth, Hampshire in England
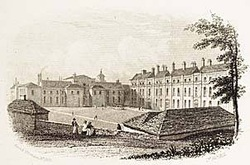
- A 19th century print of Colewort Barracks

Site information
- Type: Army barracks
- Owner: War Office
- Operator: British Army
- Condition: Closed

Location
- Location within Hampshire
- Coordinates: 50.79375°N 1.10345°W

Site history
- Built: 1680 (as garrison hospital)
- Built for: Board of Ordnance
- In use: 1694–late 1920s (as barracks)
- Fate: Demolished

Colewort Barracks was a military installation at Portsmouth, Hampshire. It was also known as St Mary's Barracks, having been built on land pertaining to the Conventual Church of St Mary Colewort.

== History ==
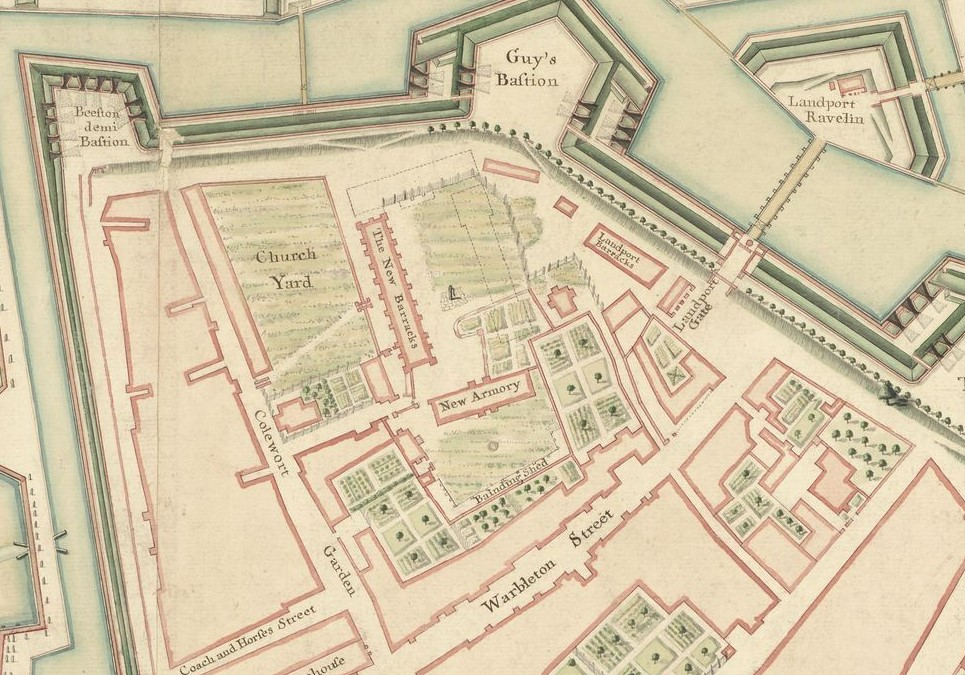
Detail of a map dated 1750, showing 'The New Barracks' and 'New Armory' alongside Colewort Garden. (Two further intended blocks are indicated in outline, but these seem not to have been built.) Drawn by J. P. Desmaretz.

The facility originated as a garrison hospital, begun in October 1680 and built by contractor Sir Thomas Finch on behalf of the Board of Ordnance. It stood on what had been glebe land (the Vicar's Close) near Landport Gate, just within the town's fortifications. The building, of oak-framed brick construction, was 192 ft (59 m) in length and two storeys high, with a projecting three-storey bay in the middle; it had four wards, flanking the central administrative block, and is estimated to have had space for around forty patients.

At the time Portsmouth was garrisoned by 12 Companies of Foot (numbering around a thousand officers and other ranks in total). Many of these soldiers were accommodated locally in temporary but purpose-built hutted lodgings, claimed to have been the first Army barracks in England (it is no longer clear where these long-since demolished huts would have stood). Evidently, further accommodation was required and in 1694 the Garrison Hospital building was converted into a barracks. In 1718 more buildings were added: a new barrack block and an armoury. The complex came to be known as Colewort Barracks, named after a type of wild cabbage which was prevalent in the local area. The old hospital building was demolished in the late 1720s.

In 1820 Colewort Barracks was described as 'a noble structure'. It formed part of a military precinct within the fortifications: adjoining it were 'the Barracks of the Royal Artillery and the Waggon Train, with an extensive range of Stables'. The adjacent garden (surviving from the time of St Mary's Convent) was now used as a burial ground, 'principally for the Military'. In 1827 an adjacent parcel of land was purchased by the government, and the following year the barracks were considerably enlarged. Later, the former Lieutenant-Governor's residence in St Thomas's Street (vacated in 1834) was converted to serve as Officers' Quarters for the Barracks.

In an Army Medical Report of 1871 it was reported that plans were in hand to erect 'new and commodious barracks' on land made available by the removal of the old fortifications, and that these would 'replace the old and condemned "Clarence" and "Colewort" barracks'. Nevertheless, in the late 1870s Colewort Barracks was still in use and now home to the Commissariat and Transport Corps; its successor the Army Service Corps remained in the barracks and was responsible for supplies, transport and accommodation during the First World War. After the war, the barracks fell into disrepair and were demolished to make way for an expansion to Portsmouth Power Station in the late 1920s.

== Description ==
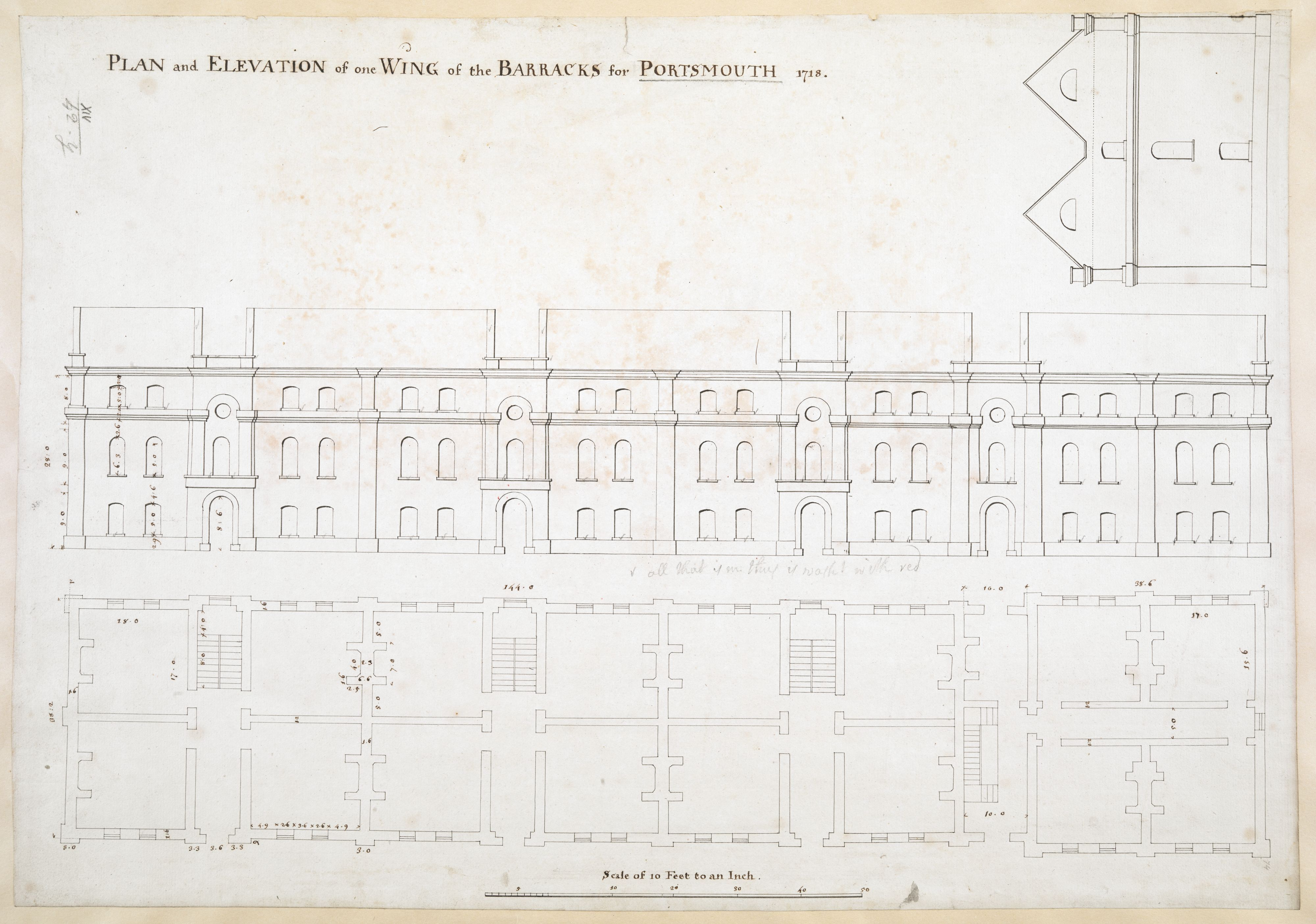
Plan and elevation of the 1718 barracks block.

The barracks were described in the Chronicles of Portsmouth (1823) as:

"...presenting a fine range of buildings, three stories high, having in front a parade-ground of large size, at one extremity of which is a building corresponding in style, formerly used as an armoury. In the front is a bold armorial sculpture of the English arms in alto relievo. Behind is a second space of ground with ranges of stabling; and on the opposite side, the apartments of the officers of the Royal Artillery. […] On the site of the barracks anciently stood a Conventual building dedicated to the Virgin Mary; and the large burial-ground called St. Mary's was the colewort or cabbage garden or close. […] The ruins of the conventual pile were extant in 1692, and used in the reconstruction of St Thomas Church".

The aforementioned 'cabbage garden', which gave the barracks its name, was still in use as a burial-ground in the early 19th century, long after the conventual chapel of St Mary had been demolished.
