= Sir Philip Monoux, 3rd Baronet =

MP for Bedford

Sir Philip Monoux, 3rd Baronet (25 January 1679 – 25 November 1707) was an English peer and politician who served as MP for Bedford from 1705 until his death on 25 November 1707.

He was the second son of Sir Humphrey Monoux, 2nd Baronet and Alice, the daughter of Sir Thomas Cotton, 2nd Baronet, of Connington. On 23 April 1701 he married Dorothy (nee Harvey), the daughter of William Harvey and had 1 son. He became a baronet on 31 July 1685, succeeding his father.

His son Sir Humphrey Monoux, 4th Baronet inherited his title.
