= Sir Humphrey Monoux, 2nd Baronet =

English politician

Sir Humphrey Monoux, 2nd Baronet (1640 – 31 July 1685) was an English politician and peer. He sat as MP for Bedfordshire in March 1679, October 1679, and 1681.

He was baptised on 10 December 1640. He was the second but eldest surviving son of Sir Humphrey Monoux, 1st Baronet and Mary, the daughter of Sir Thomas Wodehouse, 2nd Baronet. He married Alice, the daughter of Sir Thomas Cotton, 2nd Baronet of Connington on 10 July 1666 and they had three sons and three daughters.

He succeeded his father as baronet in February 1676. He died on 31 July 1685 and was buried at Wootton, Bedfordshire. His son, Philip Monoux succeeded him as third baronet.
