= Burgoyne baronets of Sutton (1642) =

Burgoyne Baronetcy
- Escutcheon of the Burgoyne baronets of Sutton
- Status: extinct

The Burgoyne baronetcy, of Sutton in the County of Bedford, was created in the Baronetage of England on 15 July 1641 for John Burgoyne, High Sheriff of Bedfordshire in 1640 and Member of Parliament for Warwickshire between 1645 and 1648.

The 2nd Baronet sat as Member of Parliament for Bedfordshire in 1640 and between 1641 and 1648 and for Warwickshire between 1656 and 1658. The 6th Baronet was Member of Parliament for Bedfordshire between 1734 and 1747. The 7th Baronet was a Major-General in the Army. The 9th Baronet was High Sheriff of Bedfordshire in 1852 and a Colonel in the Grenadier Guards. The 10th Baronet was a Lieutenant-General in the Grenadier Guards. The title became extinct on his death in 1921.

The family seats were Sutton Park and Wroxall Priory.

== Burgoyne baronets, of Sutton (1642) ==
- Sir John Burgoyne, 1st Baronet (1581–1657)
- Sir Roger Burgoyne, 2nd Baronet (1618–1677)
- Sir John Burgoyne, 3rd Baronet (c. 1651–1709)
- Sir Roger Burgoyne, 4th Baronet (died 1716)
- Sir John Burgoyne, 5th Baronet (c. 1705–1716)
- Sir Roger Burgoyne, 6th Baronet (1710–1780)
- Sir John Burgoyne, 7th Baronet (1739–1785)
- Sir Montagu Roger Burgoyne, 8th Baronet (1773–1817)
- Sir John Montagu Burgoyne, 9th Baronet (1796–1858)
- Sir John Montagu Burgoyne, 10th Baronet (1832–1921)

== Law case ==
In his will, Walter Parrott attempted to continue the memory of the baronetage by having Tim Spencer Cox change his name to Walter Tim Spencer Parrott and use the family crest and coat of arms of the Burgoyne family "interspersed" with Parrott's. This was unsuccessful.
