= Wootton House =

Listed building in Bedfordshire, England

- Location within Bedfordshire

General information
- Type: Manor house
- Location: Wootton, Bedfordshire, England
- Coordinates: 52°5′40.920″N 0°32′17.556″W
- Ordnance Survey: TL0023845046
- Year built: 17th century
- Client: Sir Humphrey Monoux

Listed Building – Grade II*
- Official name: Wootton House
- Designated: 7 May 1952
- Reference no.: 1249255

Wootton House is a late 17th-century country house in Wootton, Bedfordshire, England. It is a Grade II* listed building.

The house is built to a rectangular plan in two storeys, eight bays by five bays, of stuccoed brick with a hipped tile roof. At the front is a central classical gabled porch with paired Doric pilasters.

== History ==
The house was built for Sir Humphrey Monoux, 1st Baronet on land he had acquired from Lord Carlisle around 1660. The house and surrounding estate passed down in the Monoux family to Sir Philip Monoux, 5th Baronet, who died in 1805 leaving four daughters. The majority of the estate was inherited by the eldest daughter Mary, the widow of Sir John Payne, Bt who went on to remarry Francis Buckworth. She remained resident in the house until 1850 after which her grandson Sir Coventry Payne, Bt moved in. After his death in 1873 it passed to his 15-year-old son Philip. By this time the family fortunes, based on West Indian plantations, had dwindled and the property was heavily mortgaged. Philip was obliged to sell it to his daughter Sybil Harriet Doyne-Ditmas in 1923, who resold it in a public sale in 1927. It has since passed through several hands.

The house kept its estate until the 1950s when all of its land was sold off in lots and it ended up losing its five or so farms and cottages. It is now surrounded by 8 acres (32,000 m^{2}) of orchard, fields and lawns.

== See also ==
- Grade II* listed buildings in Bedfordshire
