= Richard Gifford of King's Somborne =

English landowner and politician (1577–1643)

Sir Richard Gifford (1577–1643) was an English landowner and Member of Parliament for Stockbridge.

He was a younger son of Sir Henry Gifford of King's Somborne (d. 1592) and Susan Brouncker, a daughter of Henry Brouncker of Erlestoke, Wiltshire. His sister Katherine Gifford (d. 1599), who married Sir Henry Wallop. His sister Bridget married Powlett. He inherited the manor of King's Somborne in Hampshire on the death of his elder brother John in 1597.

King James and Anne of Denmark stayed at King's Somborne as the guests of Richard Gifford in August 1603. His wife Winifred joined the household of Anne of Denmark as a lady of the Privy Chamber. In 1607 he wrote to the Earl of Salisbury on behalf of his friend Thomas Warburton, who he thought had been badly used by Sir Benjamin Tichborne.

He died in November 1643 and was buried at King's Somborne.

== Marriage and children ==
He married Winifred Wallop, a daughter of Sir Henry Wallop of Farleigh Wallop. Their children included:

- Richard Gifford
- Anne Gifford
- Winifred Gifford
