= Wrentham =

Wrentham may refer to:

Places

- Wrentham, Alberta, Canada
- Wrentham, Suffolk, England
- Wrentham, Massachusetts, United States of America

Other

- HMS Wrentham (M2779), a Royal Navy minesweeper
