= Old Town Hall, Wrentham =

Municipal building in Wrentham, Suffolk, England

Old Town Hall
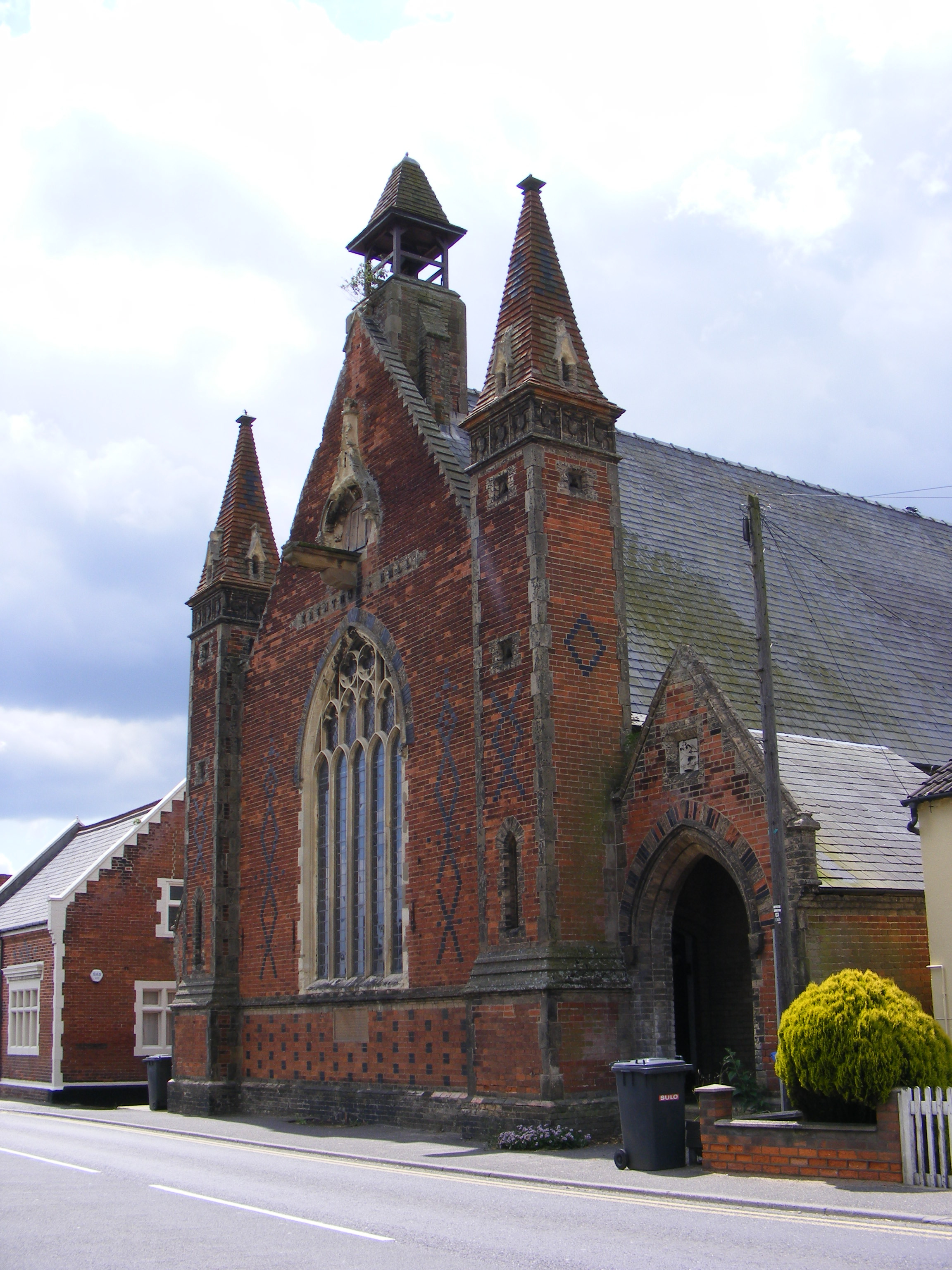
- Old Town Hall, Wrentham

- Shown in Suffolk
- 52.3856°N 1.6706°E
- Location: High Street, Wrentham

History
- Built: 1857

Site notes
- Architectural style: Gothic Revival style

Listed Building – Grade II
- Official name: Wrentham Town Hall
- Designated: 14 May 1982
- Reference no.: 1352560

The Old Town Hall is a former municipal building in the High Street in Wrentham, Suffolk, England. The building, which was the meeting place of Wrentham Parish Council, is a Grade II listed building.

== History ==
The building was commissioned by the Rector of St Nicholas' Church, the Reverend Stephen Clissold, who saw the need for a public hall in the middle of Wrentham. It was financed in part by Clissold himself and in part by a legacy from a wealthy benefactor, Miss Lehman, for the "welfare of the inhabitants". It was designed in the Gothic Revival style, built in red brick with ashlar stone dressings and was completed in 1862.

The design involved a symmetrical main frontage with five bays facing onto the High Street; the central bay featured a tall five-light arched window with tracery. The gable above contained a panel inscribed with the words "Wrentham Hall" and originally also contained a clock with a semi-circular stone canopy above. The central bay was flanked by full height square turrets, which slightly projected forward and were fenestrated by lancet windows. Beyond that, there were gabled porches on either side. At roof level, there was a cupola which was originally surmounted by a spire. Internally, the principal room was the main hall, which contained a concert organ and was designed to accommodate 400 people. The parish council placed ownership of the town hall in a charitable foundation in October 1868.

Improvements, which included a new projecting clock on the face of the building, were initiated by Sir Alfred Sherlock Gooch, 9th baronet, whose seat was at Benacre Hall, to commemorate the Diamond Jubilee of Queen Victoria in 1897. During the First World War the building was requisitioned for the use of military units in the area which included the 2/7th (Merionethshire and Montgomeryshire) Battalion, Royal Welch Fusiliers which was based in Wrentham from November 1916 to May 1917. The dials on the projecting clock were replaced with illuminated dials at the expense of Sir Thomas Vere Sherlock Gooch, 10th Baronet as part of the celebrations for the Silver Jubilee of George V in May 1935.

The building continued to serve as a venue for community events for much of the 20th century but, by the early 1980s, it was becoming increasingly dilapidated and in need of costly repairs. The parish council decided to construct a modern community hall on the corner of London Road and Southwold Road; the old town hall was auctioned and acquired by a developer for conversion to residential use in March 1985 with the proceeds being applied towards the cost of the new community hall.
