= Arthur Goodwin =

English politician

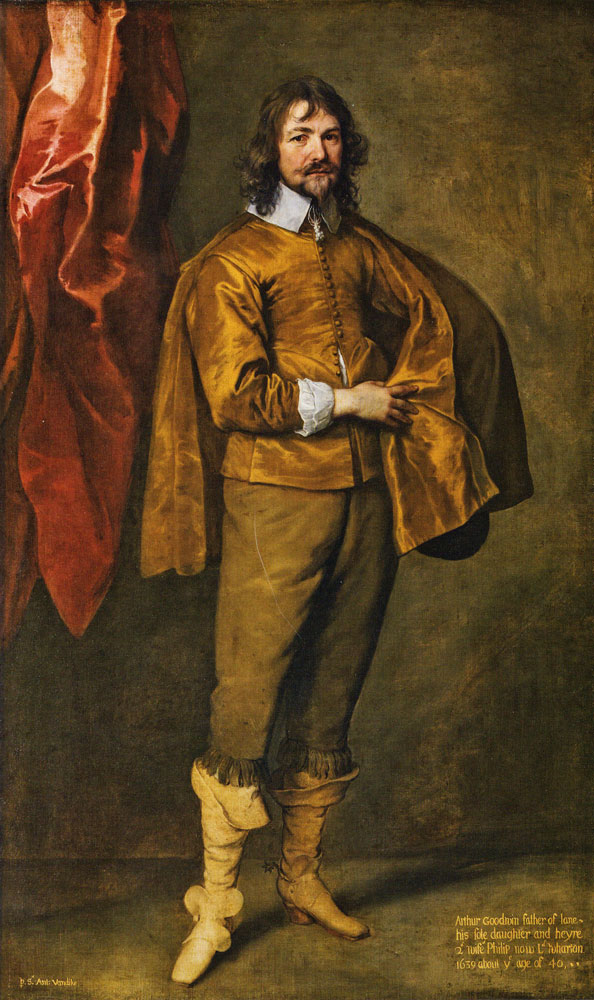

Member of the British Parliament for Wycombe
- In office 1621–1624

Member of the British Parliament for Aylesbury
- In office 1626

Member of the British Parliament for Buckinghamshire
- In office 1640–1643

Personal details
- Born: c. 1593/94
- Died: 16 August 1643
- Spouse: Jane Wenman
- Children: 1
- Parents: Francis Goodwin (father); Elizabeth Grey (mother)

Arthur Goodwin (circa 1593/94 – 16 August 1643) of Upper Winchendon, Buckinghamshire was an English lawyer and politician who sat in the House of Commons at various times between 1621 and 1643. He supported the Parliamentary cause during the English Civil War.

== Background and upbringing ==
Goodwin was the son of Francis Goodwin (1564–1634), a landed gentleman of Upper Winchendon and his wife Elizabeth Grey (died 1630), daughter of Arthur Grey, 14th Baron Grey of Wilton. He was believed to have been born in 1593 or 1594 (being described as 40 years old in his father's will in 1634) He was educated in Oxfordshire at Lord Williams's School, was a law student of the Inner Temple in 1613 and graduated with BA from Magdalen College, Oxford on 10 February 1614.

== Parliamentary career ==
In 1621 Goodwin was elected Member of Parliament for Wycombe. He was re-elected MP for Wycombe in 1624. In 1626, he was elected MP for Aylesbury.

In April 1640, Goodwin was elected with his friend John Hampden as MP for Buckinghamshire in the Short Parliament. He was re-elected MP for Buckinghamshire in November 1640 for the Long Parliament. Goodwin was a strong Parliamentarian and Puritan and opposed many of the policies of Charles I of England. When open war broke out between Parliament and the King, he gave substantial sums to the Parliamentarian cause, and commanded a cavalry regiment.

== Civil war ==
Goodwin took part at the Battle of Edgehill and Turnham Green. However, he was primarily active on his home ground in Buckinghamshire and the surrounding counties. In August 1642, he joined Hampden and Bulstrode Whitelocke to capture the Earl of Berkshire, who had been attempting to execute a commission of array in Oxfordshire for the King. Hampden and Goodwin also captured the Earl of Northampton at Daventry that year.

Goodwin was appointed Parliamentary commander-in-chief of Buckinghamshire in January 1643, and made an unsuccessful attempt to seize Brill. While harrying Prince Rupert's troops after the siege of Reading, Hampden was wounded at Chalgrove Field on 18 June 1643. Although it is often reported (by who) that Goodwin persuaded Hampden to leave the field and ride to Thame, where he died on 24 June there is no firm evidence that Goodwin even took part in the battle. (There is no evidence whatsoever of Goodwin being at the Battle of Chalgrove)

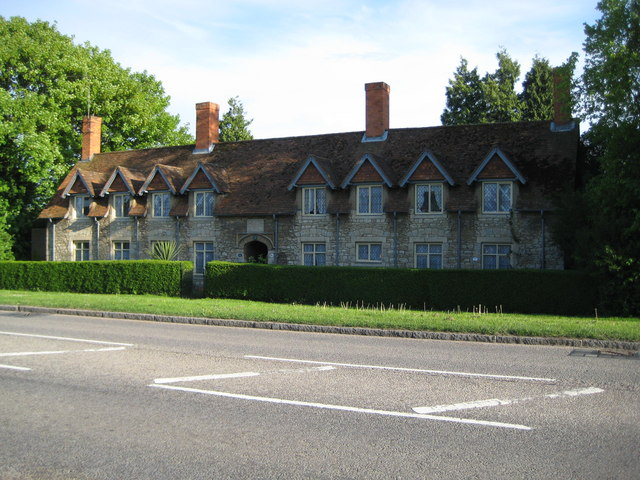
Goodwin Almhouses, Waddesdon

Goodwin himself died shortly after, at Clerkenwell, London, on 16 August 1643 of "camp fever". He was buried at Wooburn, Buckinghamshire, In his will he endowed and caused six almshouses to be erected in Waddesdon, Buckinghamshire, a project the war prevented him fulfilling when alive.

== Family ==
Goodwin married Jane Wenman, daughter of Richard Wenman, 1st Viscount Wenman in April 1618. They had one daughter Jane (1618–1658), who married Philip Wharton, 4th Baron Wharton in 1637.

== See also ==
- Dictionary of National Biography

Parliament of England
Preceded by William Borlase; Sir Henry Neville, jnr	Member of Parliament for High Wycombe; 1621–1624; With: Richard Lovelace; Henry Coke	Succeeded by Henry Coke; Thomas Lane
Preceded by Sir John Hare; Sir Robert Carr	Member of Parliament for Aylesbury; 1626; With: Clement Coke	Succeeded by Sir Edmund Verney; Clement Coke
Vacant Parliament suspended since 1629	Member of Parliament for Buckinghamshire; 1640–1643; With: John Hampden	Succeeded by George Fleetwood; Edmund West
