= Edmund Verney (Cavalier) =

English politician and soldier

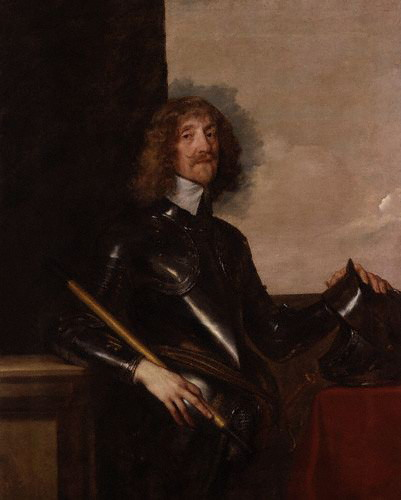
Portrait of Sir Edmund Verney, circa 1640, by Sir Anthony van Dyck

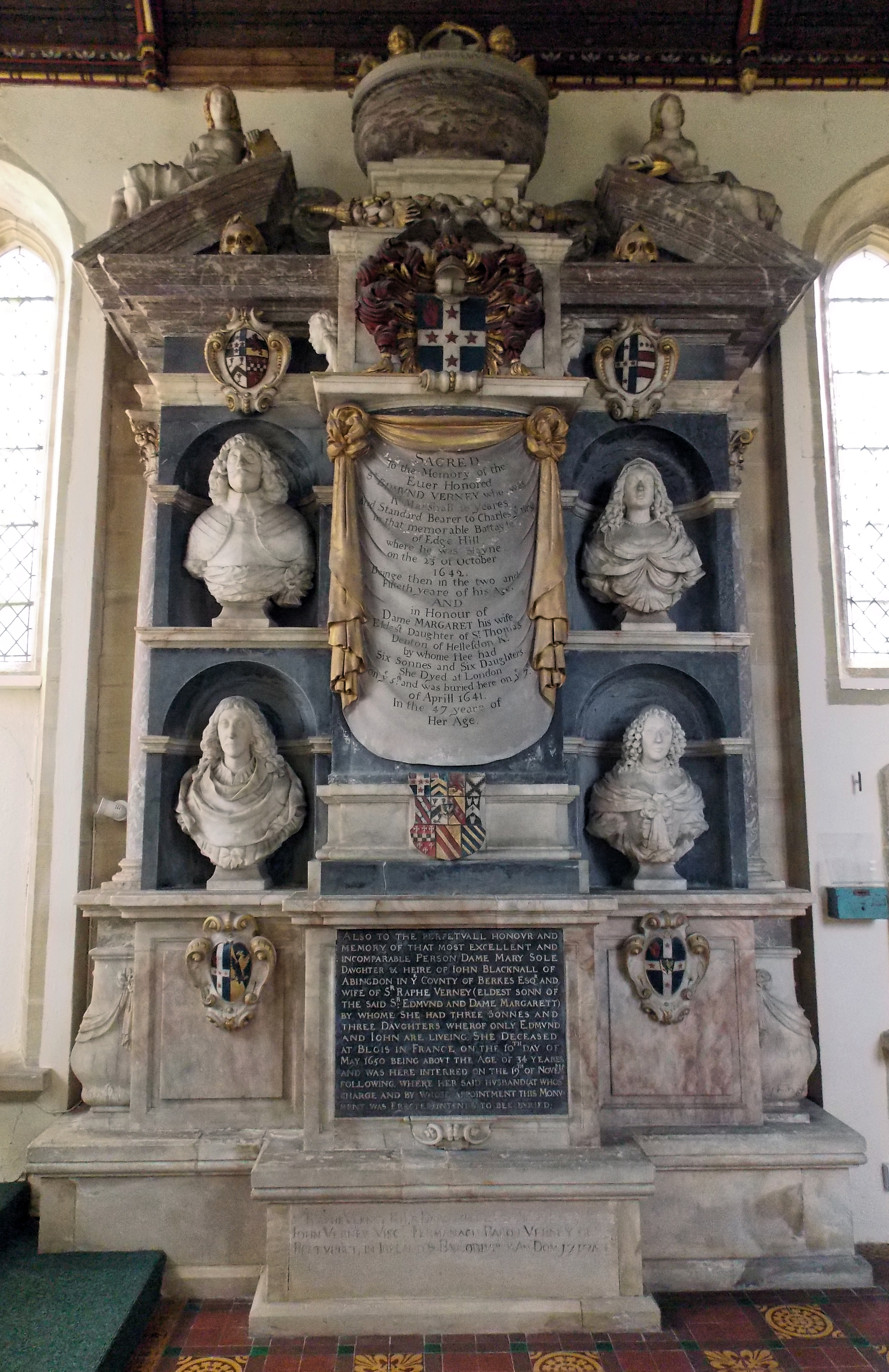
Memorial to Edmund Verney in the church next to Claydon House, the Verney family home

Sir Edmund Verney (1 January 1590 or 7 April 1596 – 23 October 1642) was an English politician, soldier and favourite of King Charles I. At the outbreak of the English Civil War he supported the Royalist cause and was killed at the Battle of Edgehill.

== Life ==
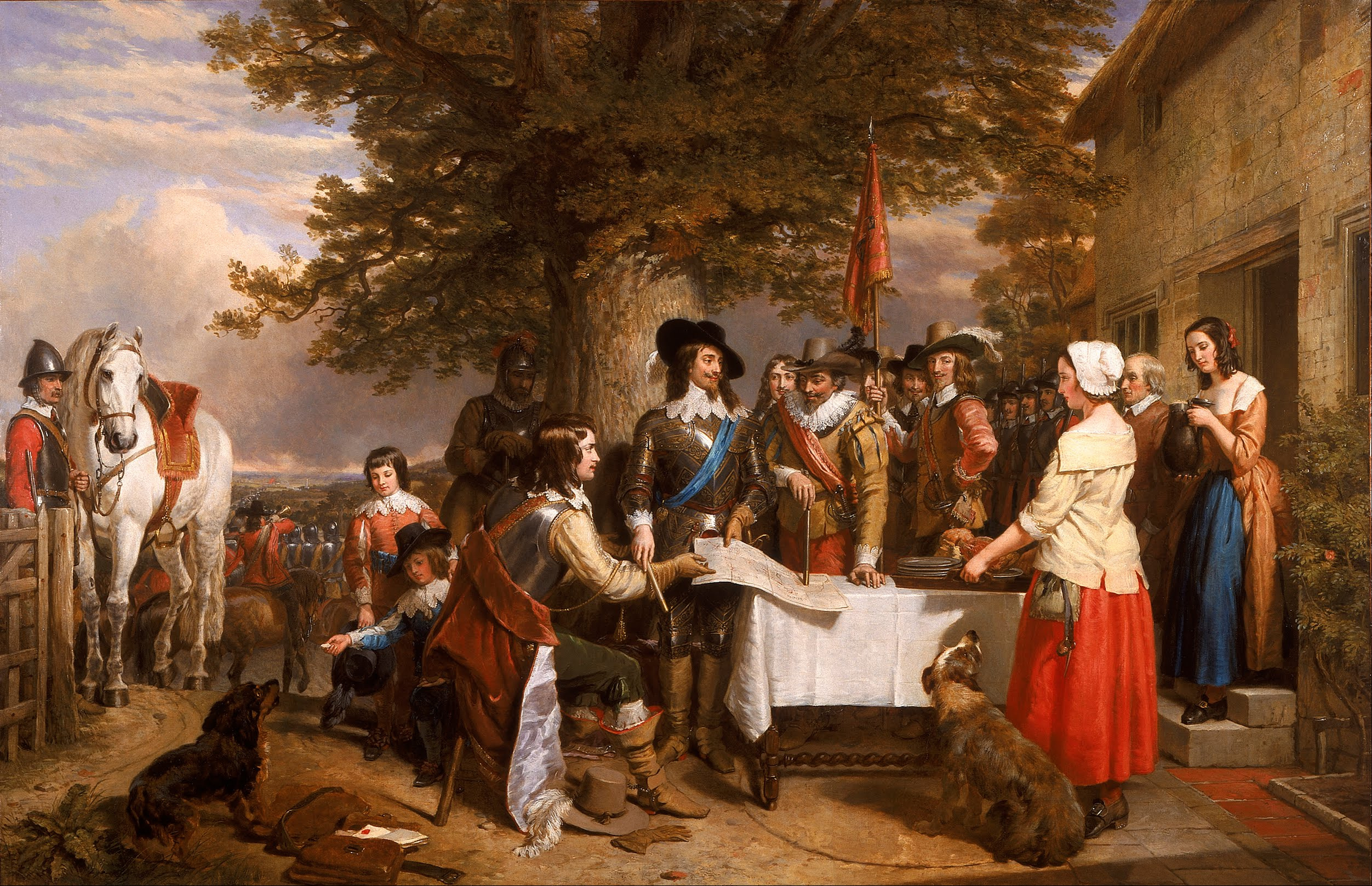
The Eve of the Battle of Edgehill by Charles Landseer, 1845. Verney is the standard-bearer behind the table.

Edmund Verney was the son of Sir Edmund Verney of Pendley Manor near Tring, Buckinghamshire, and his third wife Mary Blakeney. He was the grandson of Hon. Elizabeth Verney, second daughter of the 1st Baron Braye. He had two elder half-brothers, Sir Francis Verney who died in 1615, and Ambrose Turvile who died in 1628; and two elder half-sisters on his mother's side, Ann Turvill (who married Sir John Leeke of Edmonton), and Ursula St. Barbe, who married her stepbrother Sir Francis Verney. Knighted by King James I in 1611, Edmund was sent to Madrid, and returned to join the household of Henry Frederick, Prince of Wales, to which his uncle Francis Verney was one of the falconers. Upon Henry's death in 1612, Edmund became a gentleman of the privy chamber to Charles, Duke of York, later Charles I.

From 1620 he made his family home at Claydon House, Middle Claydon, Buckinghamshire (which the Giffard family had held by lease from the Verneys), where he was the near neighbour of Sir Thomas Chaloner of Steeple Claydon. His financial sense was poor, and he was severely indebted by the early 1620s. In 1623, he accompanied Charles and the Duke of Buckingham to Spain to court the Infanta Maria. While there, he protected a dying Englishman from a Catholic priest by punching the priest in the face, which did not endear him to the Spaniards.

Upon his return, he was elected Member of Parliament for Buckingham in 1624, and for New Romney in 1625. After the coronation of Charles that year, he was appointed Knight Marshal of England for life, the duties of which office required him to be extensively at court. He was returned for Aylesbury in 1629. Despite his income from the Knight Marshalsy, several business ventures ended in failure, and his debts were largely unrelieved.

With the approach of the English Civil War, he found himself in a painful conflict. While personally loyal to the King, he resisted the Laudian religious policies. Verney was returned to the Short Parliament and then the Long Parliament as member for Wycombe, and often found himself in opposition to the King.

Upon the outbreak of war, Verney remained true to his master and friend, King Charles, while his eldest son Ralph joined the Parliamentary forces. Made standard-bearer of the royal army, Verney was killed at the Battle of Edgehill. According to the tradition of his family, his body was never identified, except for his severed hand, found still grasping the banner.

== Family ==
He married Margaret Denton, daughter of Sir Thomas Denton of Hillesden, Buckinghamshire on 14 December 1612, with whom he had ten surviving children, including:

- Sir Ralph Verney, 1st Baronet (1613–1696), married Mary Blacknall (1616–1650)
- Thomas Verney (1615–1707)
- Sir Edmund Verney (1616–1649) who commanded the Royalist infantry at the Siege of Drogheda and was slain during the final assault (mentioned in Cromwell's letter to John Bradshaw, Esquire, President of the Council of State, dated 16 September 1649).
- Sir Henry Verney (1618–1671)
- John Verney (1619)
- Susannah Verney (1621–1651), married Richard Alport
- Penelope Verney (1622–1695), married Sir John Osborne
- Margaret Verney (1623–1667), married Thomas Elmes
- Cary Verney (1626–1704), married firstly Sir Thomas Gardiner and secondly John Stewkeley
- Mary Verney (1628–1684), married Robert Lloyd
- Richard Verney (1629)
- Elizabeth Verney (1633–1721), married Reverend Charles Adams

Parliament of England
Preceded by Richard Oliver; Sir Thomas Denton	Member of Parliament for Buckingham; 1624–1625; With: Richard Oliver	Succeeded by Richard Oliver; Sir Alexander Denton
Preceded by Francis Fetherston; Richard Godfrey	Member of Parliament for New Romney; 1625; With: Richard Godfrey	Succeeded by Thomas Brett; Richard Godfrey
Preceded by Clement Coke; Arthur Goodwin	Member of Parliament for Aylesbury; 1628–1629; With: Clement Coke	Parliament suspended until 1640
Vacant Parliament suspended since 1629	Member of Parliament for Wycombe; 1640–1642; With: Thomas Lane	Succeeded by Thomas Lane; Richard Browne
