= Francis Fetherston =

English politician

Francis Fetherston or Fetherstonhaugh (born c. 1575) was an English politician who sat in the House of Commons from 1621 to 1624.

Fetherston was the son of John Fetherstonhaugh of Stanhope Hall, County Durham and his wife Margaret Radcliff daughter of Anthony Radcliff of Blanchland, Northumberland. He matriculated at Oriel College, Oxford on 11 July 1588, aged 13. He was a student of Gray's Inn in 1591. In 1621, he was elected Member of Parliament for New Romney. He was re-elected MP for New Romney in 1624.

Parliament of England
Preceded by Sir Arthur Ingram; Robert Wilcock	Member of Parliament for New Romney; 1621–1624; With: Sir Peter Manwood 1621–1622; Richard Godfrey 1622–1624	Succeeded by Sir Edmund Verney; Richard Godfrey
