= Edward Pryce-Jones =

Sir Pryce Edward Pryce-Jones, 1st Baronet TD (6 February 1861–22 May 1926) was Conservative MP for Montgomery Boroughs.

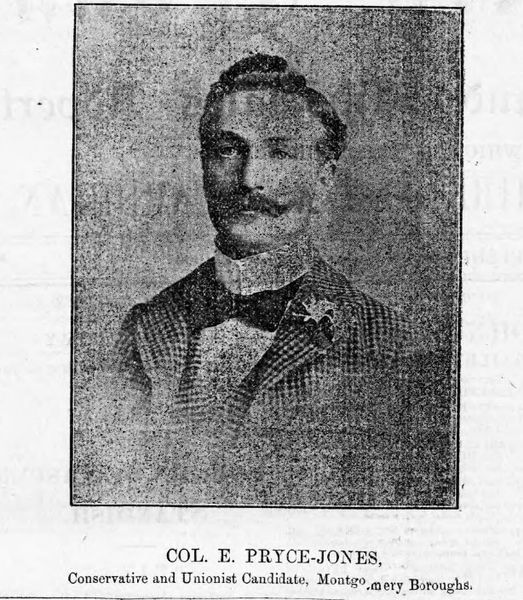
Edward-Pryce-Jones

== Early life ==
Pryce Edward Pryce-Jones was born on 6 February 1861, the eldest son of Sir Pryce Pryce-Jones (1834–1920) of Dolerw, Newtown, Montgomeryshire, who established the mail-order clothing firm of Pryce-Jones Ltd and served as MP for Montgomery Boroughs in 1884–5 and 1892–5. He qualified as a Barrister-at-Law at the Inner Temple in 1892 and received his MA from Jesus College, Cambridge, in 1893. He later served as chairman of Pryce-Jones Ltd.

== Political career ==
He won his father's old seat of Montgomery Boroughs in 1895 and held it at the 1900 election. He lost to the Liberals in 1906 and failed to win the seat back in January 1910. However, he did win it at the second election that year, in December. He stood down in 1918 when the constituency was abolished. He was created a baronet on 4 July 1918.

== Military career ==
He was commissioned into the Montgomeryshire Yeomanry in 1880 and had attained the rank of major by 1897. That year he was promoted to lieutenant-colonel to raise and command a new 5th Volunteer Battalion, South Wales Borderers, in which his younger brother, Albert Westhead, eldest son, Pryce Victor, and other members of the family also served. After the volunteers were transferred to the new Territorial Force in 1908 the battalion became the 7th (Merionethshire and Montgomeryshire) Battalion, Royal Welch Fusiliers. Pryce-Jones was appointed its Honorary Colonel and awarded the Territorial Decoration. He also served as vice-chairman of the Montgomeryshire Territorial Association. In September 1914 he was granted the temporary rank of major to help organise a service battalion for 'Kitchener's Army', relinquishing the rank in December.

== Family ==
On 17 June 1883 Pryce-Jones married Beatrice, second daughter of Herbert Hardie of Orford House, Ilsey, Cheshire. They had two children:

- Sir Pryce Victor Pryce-Jones, 2nd Baronet, born 10 June 1887
- Irene Beatrice, born 22 July 1888, married Major Harold Vaughan, MC, of Westward Ho!, Devonshire

Sir Edward died on 22 May 1926 aged 65, when he was succeeded in the baronetcy by his son. His widow died on 15 May 1928.

== Sources ==
- Army List, various dates.
- Burke's Peerage, Baronetage and Knightage, 100th Edn, London, 1953.
- F.W.S Craig, British Parliamentary Election Results 1885-1918
- Historical list of MPs^{[usurped]}
- Whitaker's Almanack, 1896 to 1918 editions

Baronetage of the United Kingdom
New creation	Baronet (of Dolerw); 1918–1926	Succeeded by Pryce Pryce-Jones
