= William Borlase (died 1630) =

English politician

William Borlase (28 December 1589 – 15 December 1630) of Little Marlow and Bockmer, Buckinghamshire was an English politician of the Borlase family who sat in the House of Commons in 1614 and from 1628 to 1629.

Borlase was the eldest son of William Borlase of Bockmer and Little Marlow, and his wife, Mary Backhouse. He matriculated at Magdalen College, Oxford on 22 June 1604, aged 15, and succeeded his father in 1629, a year before his own death.

In 1614, he was elected Member of Parliament for Wycombe. He was knighted at Warwick on 5 September 1617. In 1628, he was elected MP for Wycombe again.

Borlase died at the age of about 42. He had married Amy Popham, daughter of Sir Francis Popham, and was the father of three sons, including Sir John Borlase, 1st Baronet; William Borlase, MP for Marlow; and two daughters. His widow later married courtier Gabriel Hippesley.

Parliament of England
Preceded by Henry Fleetwood; Sir John Townsend	Member of Parliament for Wycombe; 1614; With: Sir Henry Neville, jnr	Succeeded by Richard Lovelace; Arthur Goodwin
Preceded by Henry Coke; Edmund Waller	Member of Parliament for Wycombe; 1628–1629; With: Thomas Lane	Parliament suspended until 1640
