= Henry Coke =

English politician

Henry Coke (1591–1661) was an English politician who sat in the House of Commons variously between 1624 and 1642.

Coke was the son of Sir Edward Coke, the Lord Chief Justice, of Thorington, Suffolk. He was admitted at Queens' College, Cambridge on 18 August 1607.

In 1624 Coke was elected Member of Parliament for Wycombe and was re-elected in 1625 and 1626. In April 1640, Coke was elected MP for Dunwich in the Short Parliament. He was re-elected MP for Dunwich for the Long Parliament in November 1640 and sat until he was disabled on 7 September 1642 for supporting King Charles I.

Coke died in 1661 and was buried at Thorington, Suffolk.

Coke married Margaret Lovelace, daughter of Richard Lovelace. His son Roger Coke was a writer.

Parliament of England
Preceded by Richard Lovelace; Arthur Goodwin	Member of Parliament for Wycombe; 1624–1626; With: Arthur Goodwin 1624; Thomas Lane 1625; Edmund Waller 1626	Succeeded by Thomas Lane; Sir William Borlase
Vacant Parliament suspended since 1629	Member of Parliament for Dunwich; 1640–1642; With: Anthony Bedingfield	Succeeded by Anthony Bedingfield; Gen. Robert Brewster
