= Francis Brewster (English MP) =

English politician (1623–1671)

Francis Brewster (1623 – 3 June 1671) was an English politician who sat in the House of Commons in 1653 and 1656.

== Biography ==
Brewster was the son of Robert Brewster of Wrentham Hall, Suffolk, by his wife Amy, daughter of Sir Thomas Corbet of Sprowston, Norfolk (Sprowston Hall). He was therefore a nephew of the regicide Miles Corbet. He matriculated from St Catharine's College, Cambridge at Easter 1642 and was admitted at Gray's Inn on 26 May 1646. In 1653, he was nominated as Member of Parliament for Suffolk in the Barebones Parliament. He was elected MP for Dunwich in 1656 for the Second Protectorate Parliament, on the occasion on which his father interrupted his tenure of that seat to sit for the County.

He married Cicely, the daughter and coheiress of Sir Charles Crofts of Bardwell, Suffolk and had 2 daughters. Amy, the eldest, married Sir Philip Skippon, MP for Dunwich. He was succeeded by his brother Robert Brewster (died 1681), to whom Wrentham Hall passed.

Parliament of England
Preceded by Not represented in Rump Parliament	Member of Parliament for Suffolk; 1653; With: Jacob Caley; Robert Dunkon; John Clarke; Edward Plumstead	Succeeded by Sir William Spring; Sir Thomas Barnardiston; Sir Thomas Bedingfield; William Blois; John Gurdon; William Gibbes; John Brandling; Alexander Bence; John Sicklemore; Thomas Bacon
Preceded by Robert Brewster	Member of Parliament for Dunwich; 1656	Succeeded by Robert Brewster
