= Philip Skippon (1641–1691) =

English lawyer, writer and politician

Sir Philip Skippon, FRS (28 October 1641 – 7 August 1691) was an English lawyer, writer and politician.

== Life ==
Philip was born 28 October 1641 at Hackney, the surviving son of Major-General Philip Skippon of Foulsham, Norfolk, a distinguished professional soldier who commanded troops in the New Model Army during the Civil War, most notably at Naseby. His mother was Maria Comes, whom his father married in the Netherlands church in Frankenthal, Lower Palatinate in 1622. Philip jnr was educated at Trinity College, Cambridge, where he was awarded BA in 1660. Skippon inherited substantially from his father, succeeding him in 1661, and was admitted to Gray's Inn on 5 February 1662 – 1663.

He then embarked on lengthy travels through Europe (Germany, Italy, Switzerland, France, Netherlands) between 1663 and 1666 with John Ray, the nonconformist naturalist, and his fellow pupils Francis Willughby and Nathaniel Bacon. On their return Skippon wrote an account of their travels, concerning mainly topography, engines, antiquities, classical inscriptions (in which he was thoroughly proficient), buildings, and the like: John Ray in 1673 dedicated the publication of his own account, which contained both his own and Willughby's botanical, zoological and naturalist observations, to Skippon, as being best able to vouch for the truth of what he wrote because he had been of his company when the observations were made. At the end of April 1664, in Naples, Ray and Skippon took ship for Messina, to continue their expedition together to Sicily, leaving Willughby and Bacon to return north to Rome.

Skippon was elected a Fellow of the Royal Society (1667) and was knighted on 19 April 1675. A general diary from 1667 to 1677 survives, which includes an eye-witness account of the Battle of Sole Bay. Skippon entered Parliament in March 1679 as the Member of Parliament for Dunwich. He chose not to stand for re-election in 1685 but took the seat again in 1689. Re-elected in 1690, he died in office in 1691, and was buried at Kedington. Prior to his death he had been Colonel of the Blue Regiment of Suffolk Militia.

== Family ==
Skippon married twice: first, in 1669, to Amy (died 1676), daughter and coheir of Francis Brewster of Wrentham Hall, Suffolk (where she was buried), and secondly to Anne, the daughter of Sir Thomas Barnardiston, 1st Baronet of Kedington, Suffolk. By his will and codicil of 1688, written as from Edwardstone in Suffolk, he refers to his son and heir Philip, his two daughters Mary and Anne, and his sister Dame Susanna Meredith (wife of Sir Richard Meredith, 2nd Baronet of Leeds Abbey, Kent). Mary receives, in addition to her settlement, a portrait of Major-General Skippon set in gold, various plate, five 20-shilling pieces of old gold, and selected books including Dr Burnet's History of the Reformation (two folios), Mr Cradock's book of Knowledge and Practice and Mrs Philips's Poems, and Cleopatra. Anne receives a portrait of Philip's second wife, her share of the plate, five gold pieces, a pair of bloodstone bracelets, and the books, toys and other things in "the girles clossett". Philip has the principal inheritance, is to have his cabinet of medals, and a chest of damask linen left to him by his grandmother Brewster. He appointed his brother-in-law Sir Thomas Barnardiston (the younger) and Sir Joseph Brand (of Edwardstone) to be his executors, and Sir Thomas proved the will in December 1691. Sir Joseph Brand is said to have married Mary Skippon. The younger Philip Skippon (1675–1716) was MP for Sudbury.
