= Wrentham, Suffolk =

Rural village in Suffolk, England

Coordinates: 52.384°N 1.669°E

Wrentham
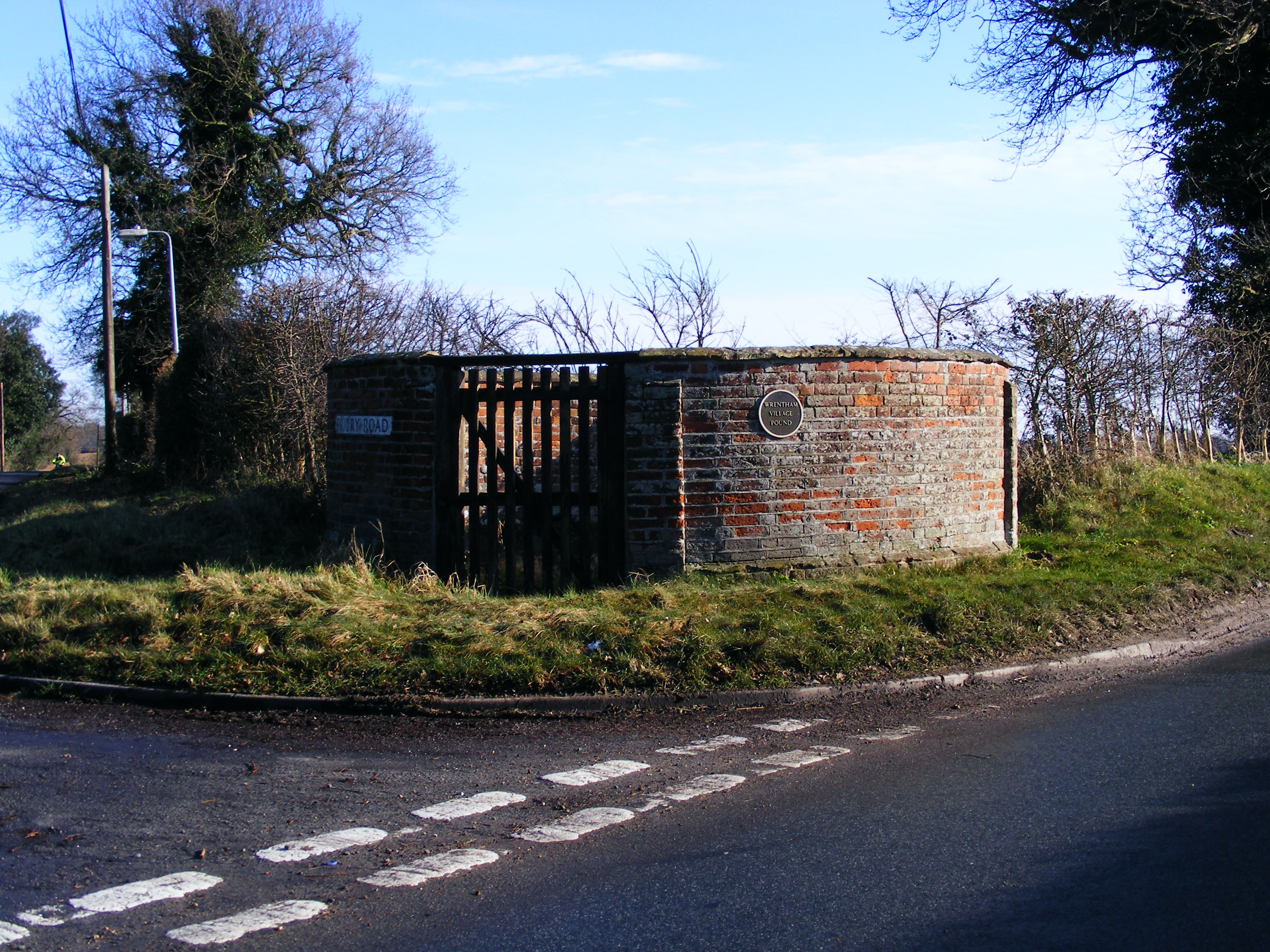
- Wrentham Village Pound

- Location within Suffolk
- Population: 966 (Including Covehithe 2011)
- OS grid reference: TM498826
- District: East Suffolk
- Shire county: Suffolk
- Region: East
- Country: England
- Sovereign state: United Kingdom
- Post town: Beccles
- Postcode district: NR34
- Dialling code: 01502
- UK Parliament: Suffolk Coastal

Wrentham is a village and civil parish in the East Suffolk district, in the north-east of the English county of Suffolk. It is located about 2 miles (3.2 km) from the North Sea coast on the A12 trunk road, about 7 miles (11 km) south-west of Lowestoft, 4 miles (6.4 km) north of Southwold and 6 miles (9.7 km) south-east of Beccles.

The village has several shops, two pubs and a village hall. The parish church is located to the west of the village, and near to it is the old circular brick animal pound, used in the 18th and 19th centuries to contain stray animals rounded up in the parish.

== History ==
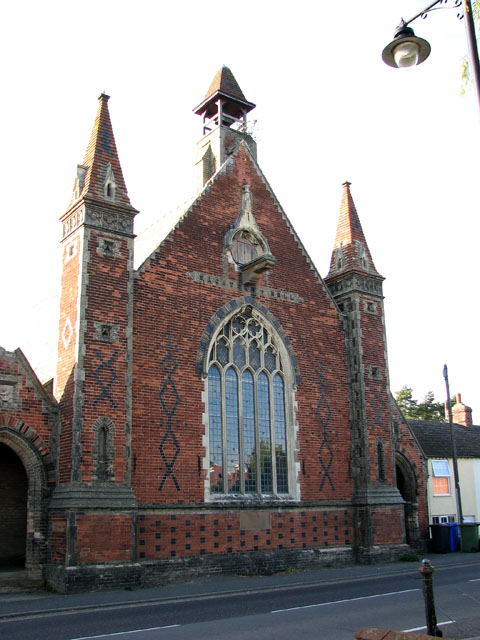
The Old Town Hall, Wrentham

The Old Town Hall, which was designed in the Gothic Revival style, was completed in 1862. During the winter of 1916–17 the 2/7th (Merionethshire & Montgomeryshire) Battalion of the Royal Welch Fusiliers was based at Wrentham. The 2012 Summer Olympics torch relay passed through the village on 5 July. The village gave its name to a Ham-class inshore minesweepers called HMS Wrentham (M2779) which was launched on 8 February 1955. A hamlet in Alberta, Canada was named Wrentham after the village by the Canadian Pacific Railway.

== Governance ==
An electoral ward in the same name exists. This ward stretches east to the coast and west to Brampton with Stoven. The total population of this ward taken at the 2011 Census was 2,224. Wrentham is in the Suffolk Coastal constituency currently represented by Jenny Riddell-Carpenter.

== The Church of St Nicholas ==
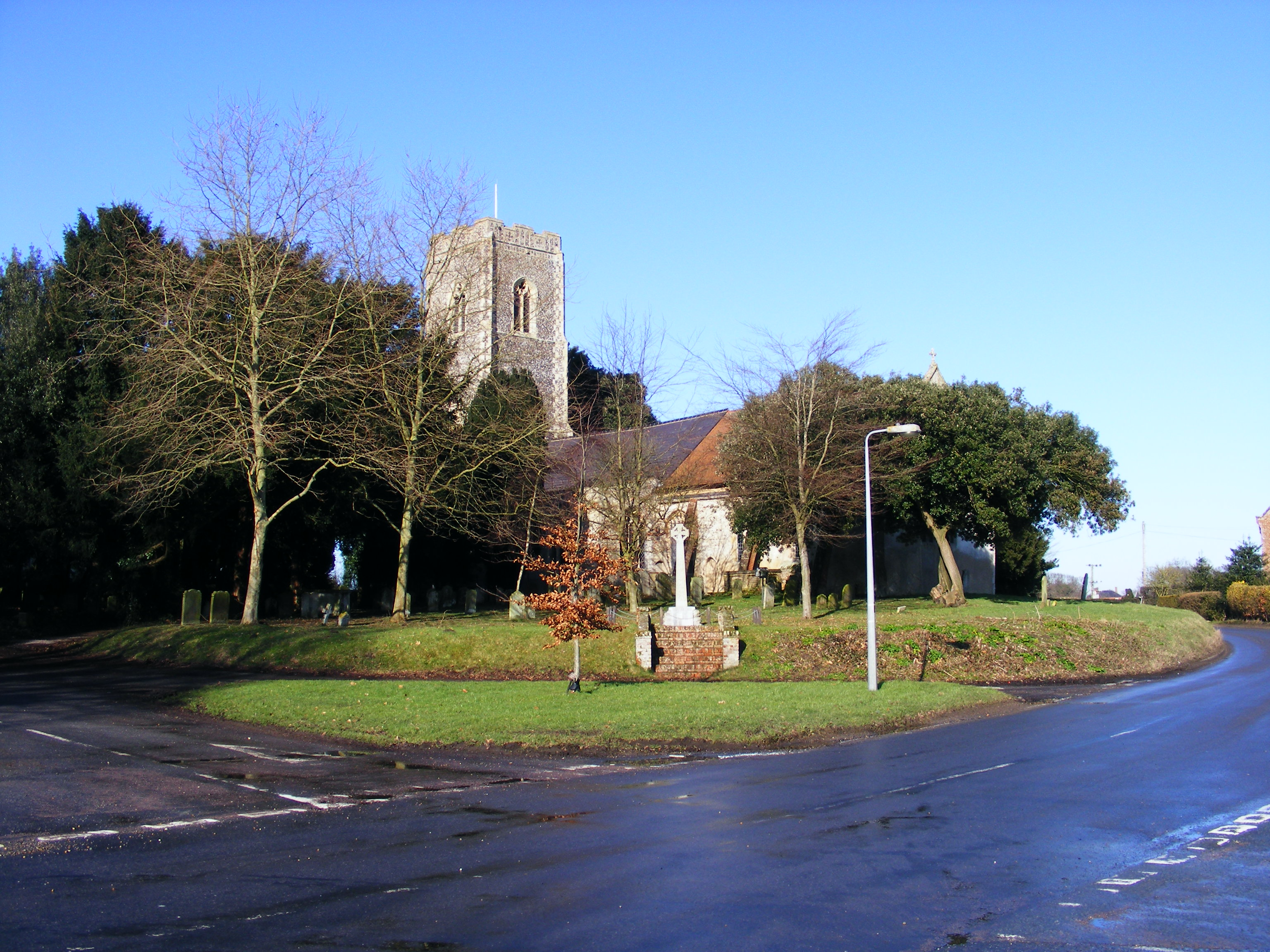
St Nicholas' Church, Wrentham

The parish church of Wrentham is dedicated to Saint Nicholas. The church is around 1 mile (1.6 km) west of the village centre. The tower, porch and south aisle are 15th century but the north aisle is Victorian. The chancel is the oldest part of the church probably built around 13th century and is supported by red-brick flying buttresses. Both the nave and chancel are very wide. The south aisle contains wooden posts on the south wall to support the roof beams. In the north aisle there is a medieval stained glass window depicting St Nicholas, reputed to be one of the oldest pictures in England. The church had a major re-roofing and restoration during 1990–2000.

The tower contains a ring of six bells hung for change ringing. The bells are rung from the ground floor in an anti-clockwise direction. The bells were cast by a range of founders spanning three centuries. The treble (the smallest) and the third were cast by Thomas Gardiner of Sudbury, Suffolk in 1723 and 1714 respectively. The second is the oldest bell in the tower, dating from 1606 and cast by John Clarke. The fourth and fifth were cast in 1906 by Mears & Stainbank and the tenor (the largest) was cast by Llewellins & James of Bristol in 1905. The tower is affiliated to the Suffolk Guild of Ringers.

== Notable residents ==
- John Phillips (c1576 – >1641), Anglican and Puritan cleric and an eminent divine.
- Robert Brewster (1599 –1663), landowner of Parliamentarian sympathies, member of parliament for Dunwich and Suffolk.
- Philip Skippon (1641 – 1691), traveller, writer, diarist, landowner and member of parliament for Dunwich
- William Wotton (1666 – 1727), theologian, classical scholar and linguist.
- William Johnson Fox (1786 – 1864), religious and political orator.
- James Ewing Ritchie (1820 – 1898), journalist and writer.
- Anne Dalgarno (1909 – 1980) Australian politician, nurse and community leader and member of Australian Capital Territory Advisory Council.

== See also ==
- HMS Wrentham
- Wrentham Hall
