= Pryce-Jones baronets =

Extinct baronetcy in the Baronetage of the United Kingdom

The coat of arms of Pryce-Jones of Dolerw (2nd version), Baronets.

The Pryce-Jones Baronetcy, of Dolerw in the County of Montgomery, was a title in the Baronetage of the United Kingdom. It was created on 4 July 1918 for Edward Pryce-Jones, for many years Conservative Member of Parliament for Montgomery. The title became extinct on the death of the second Baronet in 1963.

== Pryce-Jones baronets, of Dolerw (1918) ==
- Sir Edward Pryce-Jones, 1st Baronet (1861–1926)
- Sir Pryce Victor Pryce-Jones, 2nd Baronet (1887–1963)
