= 7th (Merionethshire and Montgomeryshire) Battalion, Royal Welch Fusiliers =

5th Volunteer Bn, South Wales Borderers 7th (Merionethshire & Montgomeryshire) Bn, Royal Welch Fusiliers 636 (Royal Welch) LAA Rgt, RA
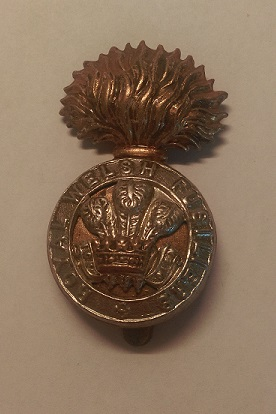
- Regimental cap badge of the Royal Welch Fusiliers
- Active: 1 April 1908–1 April 1971
- Country: United Kingdom
- Branch: Territorial Force
- Role: Infantry; Anti-aircraft artillery
- Size: 1-3 Infantry battalions 1 Artillery regiment
- Part of: 53rd (Welsh) Division
- Garrison/HQ: Newtown
- Engagements: World War I: Gallipoli; Palestine; World War II: Normandy; Reichswald; Rhine

Commanders
- Notable commanders: Sir Edward Pryce-Jones, 1st Baronet

The 7th (Merionethshire & Montgomeryshire) Battalion, Royal Welch Fusiliers, was a Welsh unit of Britain's Territorial Force. First raised in 1897, it fought at Gallipoli and in Palestine during World War I, and in the campaign in North West Europe during World War II. A duplicate battalion was converted to the paratroop role. Postwar the battalion was converted into anti-aircraft artillery, then reverted to infantry in 1956 after it amalgamated with a neighbouring unit.

== Precursor units ==
An invasion scare in 1859 led to the emergence of the Volunteer Movement, and Rifle Volunteer Corps (RVCs) began to be organised throughout Great Britain, composed of part-time soldiers eager to supplement the Regular British Army in time of need. In the Welsh county of Montgomeryshire these were:

- 1st (Newtown) Montgomeryshire RVC, formed 19 February 1860 under the command of Captain John Price Drew; also known as the '1st Newtown Rifle Volunteers'; disbanded 1872
- 2nd (Welshpool) Montgomeryshire RVC, formed 26 March 1860; disbanded 1876
- 3rd (Welshpool) Montgomeryshire RVC, formed 14 August 1860, known as the 'Railway Rifles' because the majority of the men were employees of the Oswestry and Newtown Railway, which formally opened Welshpool railway station on the same day; two companies by May 1861; disbanded 1872
- 4th (Machynlleth) Montgomeryshire RVC, formed as a sub-division 10 January 1861; disbanded March 1864
- 5th (Llanidloes) Montgomeryshire RVC, formed as a sub-division 2 March 1861; renumbered 4th in 1864; disbanded 1876

On 28 March 1861 these independent corps were grouped together as the 1st Administrative Battalion, Montgomeryshire Rifle Volunteer Corps, with headquarters (HQ) at Welshpool.

In neighbouring Merionethshire the following units were raised:

- 1st (Bala) Merionethshire RVC, formed 11 November 1859, disbanded March 1864
- 2nd (Dolgellau) Merionethshire RVC, formed 15 May 1861, renumbered 1 March 1864; disbanded after February 1872
- 3rd (Corwen) Merionethshire RVC, formed 15 September 1860, moved to Ffestiniog 1861; disbanded after March 1864

In 1863 Capt Price Drew of the 1st RVC was appointed Major-Commandant of the 1st Admin Bn of Montgomeryshire RVCs and moved its HQ to Newtown in 1864. That year the battalion took over the remaining 1st Merioneth RVC, as well as the 2nd (Aberystwyth) Cardiganshire RVC, which was disbanded in 1866. In 1865 Capt Robert Devereux Harrison from the 2nd RVC succeeded as major-commandant of the battalion, which moved back to Welshpool in 1870. Recruitment was poor in the sparsely populated rural counties of Wales, and discontent over the Secretary of State for War's refusal to sanction a commission for a sergeant in the corps led to mass resignations in the 3rd RVC in 1872. These were sufficient to warrant its disbandment, followed by the break-up of the Montgomeryshire Admin Bn the following year. Its remaining units (the 2nd and 4th RVCs) weretransferred to the 1st Administrative Battalion, Shropshire Rifle Volunteer Corps. This move was unpopular with the Montgomeryshire men and led to further resignations and disbandments. After 1876 there were no remaining Volunteer units in Montgomery or Merioneth.

== Volunteer Force ==
After a 20-year hiatus, a new volunteer unit appeared in Montgomery after Edward Pryce-Jones, MP for Montgomery Boroughs, petitioned the War Office. His proposal was sanctioned on 12 February 1897, the new 5th Volunteer Battalion, South Wales Borderers, consisting of four companies. Pryce-Jones, who was a Major in the Montgomeryshire Yeomanry, was appointed major-commandant on 1 April. (He was promoted to Lieutenant-Colonel a year later.) Battalion HQ was established at Newtown with two companies, the other companies being at Welshpool and at Machynlleth and Llanfair Caereinion. Enrolment began on 7 April and included the Newtown Silver Band, who became the official battalion band. The battalion carried out its first training at Tywyn, in July, and the following February the link with Merionethshire was renewed when F Company was raised in that town; an additional Montgomery company (E Company) was formed in March. After a link was made with University College, Aberystwyth on 7 March 1900, the battalion's organisation and drill stations were as follows by May 1901:

- Battalion HQ at Newtown
- A Company at Newtown and Llanidloes
- B Company at Newtown and Montgomery
- C Company at Welshpool and Llanfair
- D Company at Machynlleth and Corris (Merioneth)
- E Company at Aberdovey (Merioneth) and UCW Abersytwyth
- F Company at Tywyn (Merioneth) (took over Aberdovey detachment)

From 1899 the battalion trained with the South Wales Volunteer Infantry Brigade (VIB), but in 1902 the VIBs were reorganised and thereafter the five SWB VBs comprised the South Wales Border Brigade.

=== Second Boer War ===
After Black Week in December 1899, the volunteers were invited to send active service units to assist the Regulars in the Second Boer War. In January 1900 the War Office decided that one Volunteer Service Company (VSC) company 114 strong could be recruited from the volunteer battalions of any infantry regiment that had a regular battalion serving in South Africa. The SWB's five VBs accordingly raised a service company between them, 5th VB being asked to supply only one officer, one sergeant, one corporal, one bugler and 18 privates, though 28 per cent of the battalion had put their names forward.

After training, the 1st VSC of the SWB sailed to South Africa, disembarking at Cape Town on 9 March. Once acclimatised it was assigned to guard railway bridges. In May it went by railway to join the 2nd Battalion, SWB, serving with Lord Roberts' army advancing towards Johannesburg. The Volunteers came into action for the first time at the Battle of Zand River on 10 May, when the 2nd SWB helped to dislodge the Boers from their positions on the opposite bank of the river, the 1st VSC suffering its first casualty. The Boers retreated and the 2nd SWB participated in the ceremonial entry into Johannesburg on 30 May.

On 2 June SWB moved out to protect the railway to Rhenoster, and the 1st VSC and another company spent July–August digging in at Vrederfort Road. In August the battalion reassembled and moved back to Johannesburg to take part in a month-long 'drive' to try to break Boer resistance. With the war apparently ending, the 1st VSC left 2nd SWB and began its journey home on 1 October, but it was repeatedly delayed and diverted to duties on the lines of communication, and it was not until 27 April 1901 that it finally embarked at Cape Town.

With the war continuing, a relief VSC (2nd VSC, SWB) was mobilised in February 1901. Unlike a year earlier far fewer volunteers came forward, many being discouraged by stories of hard service and the poor pay compared to that received by volunteers for the Imperial Yeomanry. The 2nd VSC also carried out railway guard duties, then joined 2nd SWB at Klerksdorp. Here it was employed in patrolling and manning the blockhouse line. The 2nd VSC was released just before the war ended and arrived at Southampton on 25 May. A 3rd VSC, SWB, was mobilised in February 1902, but it was now hard to get volunteers. After a short spell in South Africa it was released after the Treaty of Vereeniging and reached home on 2 August.

The contribution of volunteers to the service companies earned the 5th Bn its first Battle honour: South Africa 1900–01.

== Territorial Force ==
When the Volunteers were subsumed into the new Territorial Force (TF) under the Haldane Reforms of 1908, the battalion was transferred from the South Wales Borderers to the Royal Welch Fusiliers (Note: The regiment used the spelling 'Welch' in preference to 'Welsh', even though this was not officially recognised until 1920.) as the 7th (Merionethshire & Montgomeryshire) Battalion. (Note: One source suggests that between March 1909 and 1937 the battalion dropped the Merioneth part of its title, but the full title appears in the Army List throughout those years.) E Company at Aberystwyth University transferred to the Senior Division of the Officers' Training Corps. Not all members were prepared to transfer to the TF (the battalion did not achieve its full established strength until after the outbreak of World War I), but when the reorganisation was completed on 30 June 1908 the battalion was distributed as follows:

- HQ & B Company at Back Lane, Newtown
- A Company at Victoria Avenue, Llanidloes, and Carno with drill stations at Kerry Street Armoury, Montgomery, Caersws and Carno
- C Company at Brook Street, Welshpool, with drill stations at Llanfair, Llanfechain, Llanfyllin and Llanwddyn
- D Company at Maengwyn Street, Machynlleth, with drill stations at Cemmaes, Corris and Llanbrynmair
- E Company at Dolgellau, with drill stations at Barmouth and Harlech
- F Company at Brook Street, Neuadd Pendre, Tywyn, with drill stations at Aberdovey, Abergynolwyn and Llwyngwril
- G Company at Dorvill Road, Blaenau Ffestiniog with drill station at Penrhyndeudraeth
- H Company at Pensarn Road, Neuadd Buddug, Bala, with drill station at Corwen

It formed part of the North Wales Brigade of the TF's Welsh Division.

== World War I ==
=== Mobilisation ===
On 3 August 1914 the Welsh Division's infantry brigades were at their annual camps when all training was cancelled and the battalions were ordered back to their HQs; war was declared next day. On 5 August they mobilised, and had concentrated at their war stations (at Conway in the case of the North Wales Brigade) by 11 August. On that date TF units were invited to volunteer for Overseas Service and on 15 August the War Office issued instructions to separate those men who had signed up for Home Service only, and form these into reserve units. On 31 August, the formation of a reserve or 2nd Line unit was authorised for each 1st Line unit where 60 per cent or more of the men had volunteered for Overseas Service. The titles of these 2nd Line units would be the same as the original, but distinguished by a '2/' prefix. In this way duplicate battalions, brigades and divisions were created, mirroring those TF formations being sent overseas. Later 3rd Line units were formed to train drafts for the 1st and 2nd Line.

=== 1/7th (Merionethshire & Montgomeryshire) Battalion ===
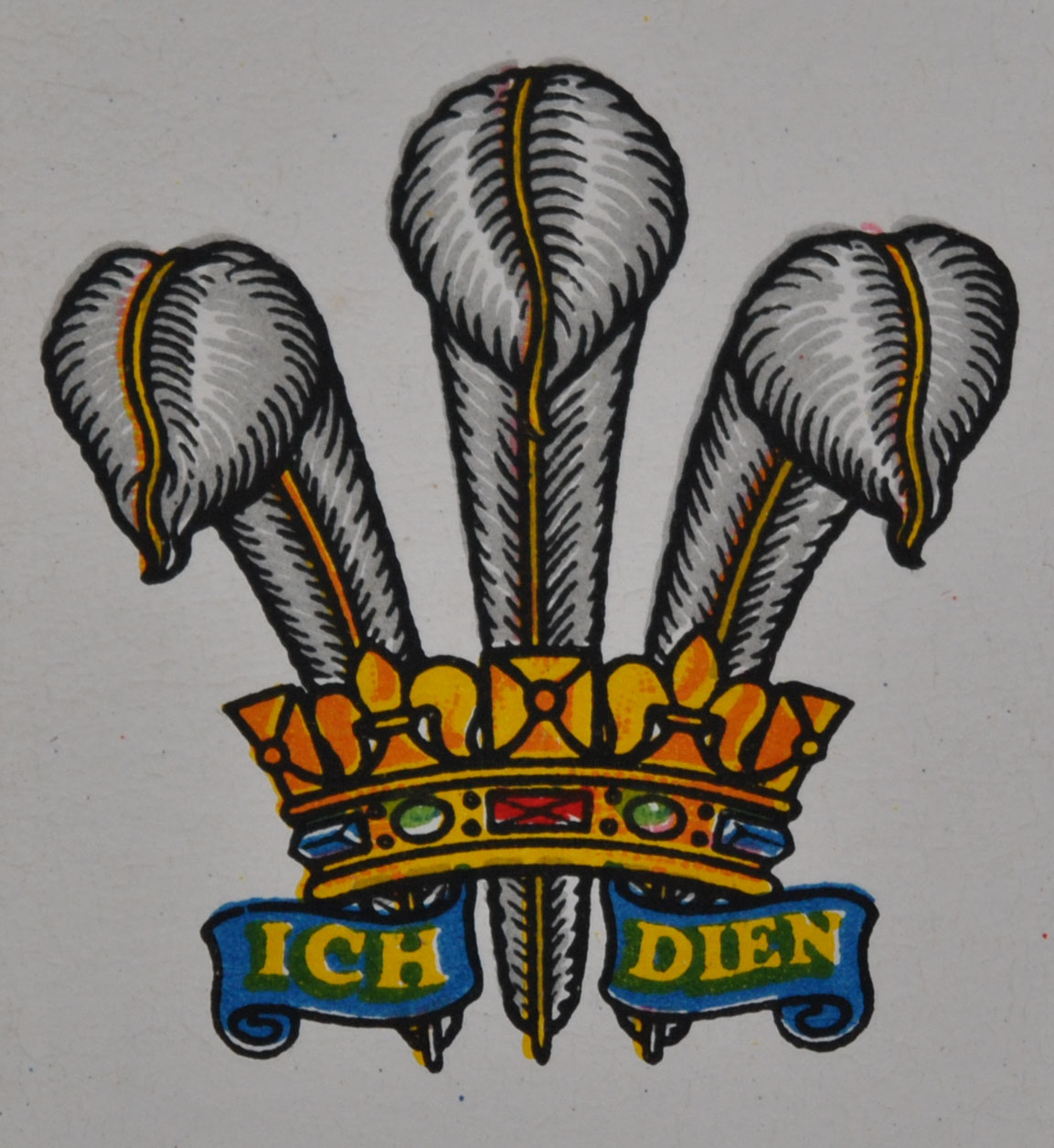
The Prince of Wales's feathers formation badge of the 53rd (Welsh) Division in World War I.

The Welsh Division moved to Northampton at the end of August 1914, where on 18 November it was warned for service in India, but this was subsequently cancelled. Training was interrupted by periods spent digging trenches for the East Coast defences. In December the division moved to Cambridge, then to Bedford in May 1915, where it was numbered as the 53rd (Welsh) Division, and the North Wales Brigade became the 158th (North Wales) Brigade. By July the battalion was at Rushden in Northamptonshire. On 2 July the division was ordered to refit for service in the Mediterranean. A and D Companies of 1/7th Bn entrained for Devonport on 14 July, embarking on the City of Edinburgh and sailing next day. The rest of the battalion went to Devonport on 16 July and sailed on the Huntsend and the Ulysses. The battalion arrived at Alexandria on 28 July.

==== Gallipoli ====
The battalion re-embarked and sailed via Port Said and Lemnos to arrive at Mudros on 7 August. Next day the division took part in the Landing at Suvla Bay, an attempt to break the Trench warfare deadlock in the Gallipoli Campaign. The battalion landed at 'C' Beach during the morning of 9 August and bivouacked at Lala Baba.

158th Brigade supported 159th (Cheshire) Brigade in an attack towards Scimitar Hill on 10 August with 1/7th RWF in the centre of the brigade. The officers had no maps and confusion reigned, but the battalion advanced across the Salt Lake under heavy shrapnel and rifle fire. The leading battalions penetrated to within a few hundred yards of Scimitar Hill before they were driven back by Turkish fire. The 1/7th Bn was later withdrawn to the British 1st and 2nd lines; further attempts to take Scimitar Hill during the afternoon all failed.

The corps commander, Lt-Gen Sir Frederick Stopford, had lost confidence in 53rd (W) Division, and would not use it in the subsequent phases of the battle. On 14 August the 1/7th RWF was sent down to 'C' Beach and re-embarked for Mudros, where it spent the next two months unloading stores and guarding Turkish prisoners. During its five days on the Gallipoli peninsula it had suffered 9 officers and 13 other ranks (ORs) killed or died or wounds, 7 officers and 138 ORs wounded and 74 ORs missing.

On 14 October the 1/7th Bn boarded the Sarnia and returned to Suvla to rejoin 158th Bde. With a strength of 29 officers and 496 ORs it was one of the strongest units in the division, which had suffered badly from sickness as well as battle casualties; several battalions had to be temporarily amalgamated. Turkish artillery became more active during November, adding to the toll of casualties from trench-holding, the trenches were flooded, and later there was a blizzard. By the end of the month the battalion had 105 men in hospital suffering from exposure and Trench foot, leaving a strength of 19 officers and 287 ORs when it was sent to Lala Baba on 1 December to work on defences and beach fatigues. The effective strength of 53rd (W) Division was now so low that it was decided to evacuate the remnants. On 12 December the battalion moved to 'C' Beach to embark for Mudros. The division was then shipped to Alexandria, where it landed between 20 and 23 December.

==== Egypt ====
On arrival in Egypt the division went by rail to Wardan to recuperate. In mid-February 1916 158th Bde was sent to guard the water supplies at Wadi Natrun, where reinforcement drafts were absorbed and training was carried out. In May the brigade moved to Zeitoun, Cairo, where it rejoined the rest of 53rd (W) Division in the Suez Canal defences. By July 158th Bde was near Moascar, digging defences, but when it became clear that the Turks were crossing the Sinai Desert to attack the canal line, the brigade was sent by train and route march to Romani to reinforce 52nd (Lowland) Division in No 3 Section of the Canal Defences, arriving on 21 July. The brigade took up positions in Redoubts 6 to 10a, but 1/7th RWF was not engaged when the Turks attacked on 4 August (the Battle of Romani), and 158th Bde remained in position after the Turks retreated.

==== Gaza ====
158th Brigade returned to the canal on 14 August and spent the next three months at Ferdan. By the end of the year it was back at Romani, the Egyptian Expeditionary Force (EEF) having cleared Sinai of the enemy. On 20 January 1917 53rd (W) Division began the march across the Sinai Desert, reaching Wadi el Arish at the end of the month. It moved up to Rafah on 21 March. After an approach march beginning on 24 March, the EEF attacked Gaza on 26 March, launching the First Battle of Gaza. 53rd (W) Division in the Desert Column was ordered to cross the Wadi Ghuzze towards Gaza itself, masked by the mounted divisions sweeping round the flank. The division was led by 160th (Welsh Border) Bde, followed by 158th. There was an overnight fog, so 158th Bde was late crossing the wadi, but by 06.30 it reached the edge of the Mansura ridge overlooking the plain of Gaza. At 11.30 the division was hurriedly ordered to attack, even though the artillery had not yet established communications. 158th Brigade set out shortly after 11.45 to attack Ali Muntar. The whole advance, watched by the mounted divisions, was 'a model in precision and steadiness'. After leaving the protection of Mansura the three battalions marched across open ground parallel to the Ali Muntar defences before wheeling left and moving towards their objectives. Rifle fire now broke out from Green Hill and slowed the advance. Here firing became general, but 159th Bde came up on the right flank of 1/7th Bn and the whole line then advanced again. Held up a second time, Capt Walker of 1/7th RWF, with about 40 of his own men and 40 of the neighbouring 1/5th Welch Regiment, made a sudden rush that pierced the Turkish line close to the mosque and captured about 20 Turk and similar number of Austrians and Germans. By 18.30 the whole Ali Muntar position was won, and by nightfall Gaza was almost completely surrounded, with patrols from 53rd (W) Division in the eastern streets linking up with the ANZAC Mounted Division. However, the senior British commanders were unaware of the success, and had already ordered the mounted troops to withdraw to water their horses. 53rd (W) Division was ordered to dig in on a line near Wadi Ghuzze next day, with 1/7th linking the two brigades. At the end of the day the whole division was withdrawn across the wadi, 158th Bde arriving at 01.15 on 28 March. The battalion's casualties were the worst in the brigade, with 9 officers and 38 ORs killed, 7 officers and 219 ORs wounded, and 15 ORs missing.

Both sides brought up reinforcements and carried out reconnaissances while the EEF prepared for a Second Battle of Gaza. 53rd (W) Division dug a new forward line on sand dunes along the coast. When the attack was made on 18 April, 158th Bde held this new line, the other brigades passing through and assaulting Samson Ridge with tank support. As the attack developed, 158th Bde moved up in support, with 1/7th RWF sent to help the right flank. But the division was still held up at Samson Ridge by the end of the day, and dug in where it stood.

Trench warfare now set in for the summer, while the EEF was reorganised under new command and intensive training was carried out behind the lines. On 20 October 158th Bde moved up to the concentration area for the new offensive (the Third Battle of Gaza), taking over 'Kent Fort' and reconnoitring the ground over which they were to attack. On 25 October the brigade moved into No man's land and established an outpost line. On 27 October the division advanced to take over a line of hills already occupied by the Yeomanry of the 8th Mounted Brigade. However, the Yeomanry outpost on Hill 630 was overwhelmed by the Turks, who then had perfect observation over the plain where 158th Bde was moving up, and began shelling the concentration of troops. Once the division was re-organised for an attack, the Turks slipped away and the line of hills was easily reoccupied. The main attack, a turning movement against Beersheba (the Battle of Beersheba) began on 31 October; 53rd (W) Division on the left flank was hardly engaged: 1/7th RWF with 1/1st Herefordshire Regiment was ordered to make a demonstration to support 230th Bde's attack, but the latter met no opposition.

After the capture of Beersheba, the EEF thrust into the hills beyond, with 53rd (W) Division marching through Beersheba to occupy a line beyond without any fighting. On 3 November the division advanced into the hills in a series of columns, 158th Bde in reserve. After a two-day lull during a sandstorm and a difficult assembly close up to Tel el Khuweilfe, 158th Bde carried out a fullscale assault on the position at 04.20 on 6 November. 1/7th Battalion formed up in column, with the Lewis gun ammunition carried by the infantry, the Lewis gun mules being used for spare ammunition and grenades. Each man carried two water bottles, 170 rounds of ammunition, and a spare day's ration. Once it reached the line of deployment the battalion formed up on a four-platoon frontage in five lines, the fifth being composed of the Lewis gun teams. The battalion moved off three minutes late but under cover of the barrage it gained its objective (Tel el Khuweilfe itself) with few casualties by 05.03. The battalion mistook an advanced group of 1/6th RWF and 1/1st Herefords for Turks and called down artillery fire on them, causing some casualties and a retirement. Fog then engulfed the hills and deadlock set in, but when it cleared the Turks began to counter-attack. At first they threw 1/7th RWF off the hill, but prompt artillery support enabled the battalion to retake it at the point of the bayonet. Four further Turkish counter-attacks failed. At dusk the 1/7th RWF were relieved, and next day the Desert Mounted Corps (DMC) swept round the flank of the pinned enemy. 53rd (W) Division was ordered to stand fast, and that night the Turks in front pulled out as the entire Turkish army began a headlong retreat.

==== Jerusalem ====
From 10 November 53rd (W) Division remained in the area, so as not to overload the supply lines for the advancing parts of the EEF. It did not move forward again until early December, and even then limited supplies meant that 158th Bde was left at Beersheba. It was not brought forward until 21 December, by which time the Battle of Jerusalem was over. At Christmas 158th Bde relieved 159th Bde, in the line covering Jerusalem, with 1/7th RWF in brigade reserve. Late on 26 December the Turks launched a major counter-attack aiming to recapture Jerusalem, and the fighting spread to 53rd (W) Division's front on 27 December, though 158th Bde was hardly engaged, mainly supporting 160th Bde on its flank. A 'feeble' attack against it was easily checked and by the end of the day the brigade had reoccupied a captured village. As the Turkish attacks faded away, the division went over to the attack itself, 158th Bde attacking the villages and high ground in its front. 1/7th Battalion captured White Hill behind a barrage after dusk. The brigade took further ground on 28 December: an attack by one-and-a-half companies of 1/7th RWF towards Ras Arqub es Suffa was held up by machine gun fire but a second bombardment enabled the battalion to occupy the village after dusk. 53rd (W) Division held its line throughout the bad weather of January 1918, with 158th Bde providing working parties to improve the roads for the EEF's next advance, aimed at Jericho. This began on 14 February, supported by 53rd (W) Division, and the town was captured by 22 February.

==== Tell 'Asur ====
In March the EEF began an advance in the Jordan Valley. 53rd (W) Division's next objective was Tell 'Asur, the highest point of Judaea north of Jerusalem, and it had to tackle the most difficult terrain in the whole operation. The division occupied No man's land in the preceding days, then advanced silently at 02.00 on 9 March, with 1/7th RWF supporting 1/1st Herefords against Drage Hill. There was a fog when the sun rose, but the Herefords took Drage Hill. They were then directed to take Chipp Hill, and severe fighting ensued before they were forced back to Drage Hill. The brigadier pushed 1/7th RWF up behind Drage Hill at 07.30, and then sent them to relieve the Herefords. No sooner had they completed this than they were attacked by the Turks. Fighting continued through the night and next day, and the division completed its objectives by 12 March. 158th Brigade was not engaged in the various raids across the Jordan carried out by the EEF during Spring 1918, but 1/7th Bn was sent across the river into the bridgehead on 29 March before returning on 1 April when the raiding force was withdrawn.

In the summer of 1918 53rd Division was changed to the Indian Army establishment: only one British battalion was retained in each brigade, the remainder being sent as reinforcements to the Western Front. The battalion (now simply the 7th RWF following the disbandment of the 2/7th Bn, see below) transferred to 160th Bde on 24 June and served with it for the rest of the war alongside Indian and South African battalions.

==== Megiddo ====
At the climactic Battle of Megiddo 53rd Division was tasked with advancing across the Samieh Basin towards Nablus, to threaten the Turks' communication centre and block the exits to the Jordan Valley (the Battle of Nablus). It attacked in moonlight late on the first day (18 September), after a 20-minute bombardment, and 7th RWF had captured all its objectives on the north side of the basin by 03.00 next day. The roads were very bad, and the Royal Engineers struggled to make a path for the guns, but the advance continued, and by the end of 22 September the Turkish army was shattered, its retreat was being harried by artillery and aircraft.

The advanced troops of the division were now south-east of Nablus, but 53rd (W) Division was ordered to stand fast and did not take part in the pursuit of the defeated Turkish army. For the next few days it was employed in clearing the battlefield and repairing the Nablus road. On 26 September it moved back to Tell 'Asur, and by 12 October it had moved to Ramle, where on 27 October it began entraining for Alexandria. The Armistice of Mudros ended the fighting in Palestine on 31 October. On 20 December demobilisation instructions were received and the first parties left for home on 22 December. The Indian battalions left in early 1919 as transport became available. The 7th RWF was one of the last British units to leave, being reduced to a cadre on 23 January 1920 and officially disembodied on 12 March.

==== Commanding officers ====
The following officers commanded 1/7th RWF during the war:

- Lt-Col A.E.J. Reveley from 18 May 1914
- Capt J.O.W. Williams from 18 December 1914 [?]
- Maj (later Lt-Col) T.H. Harker from 8 March 1915
- Maj Owen Owen, acting 26 August–2 October 1916 and 24 June–7 August 1917

=== 2/7th (Merionethshire & Montgomeryshire) Battalion ===
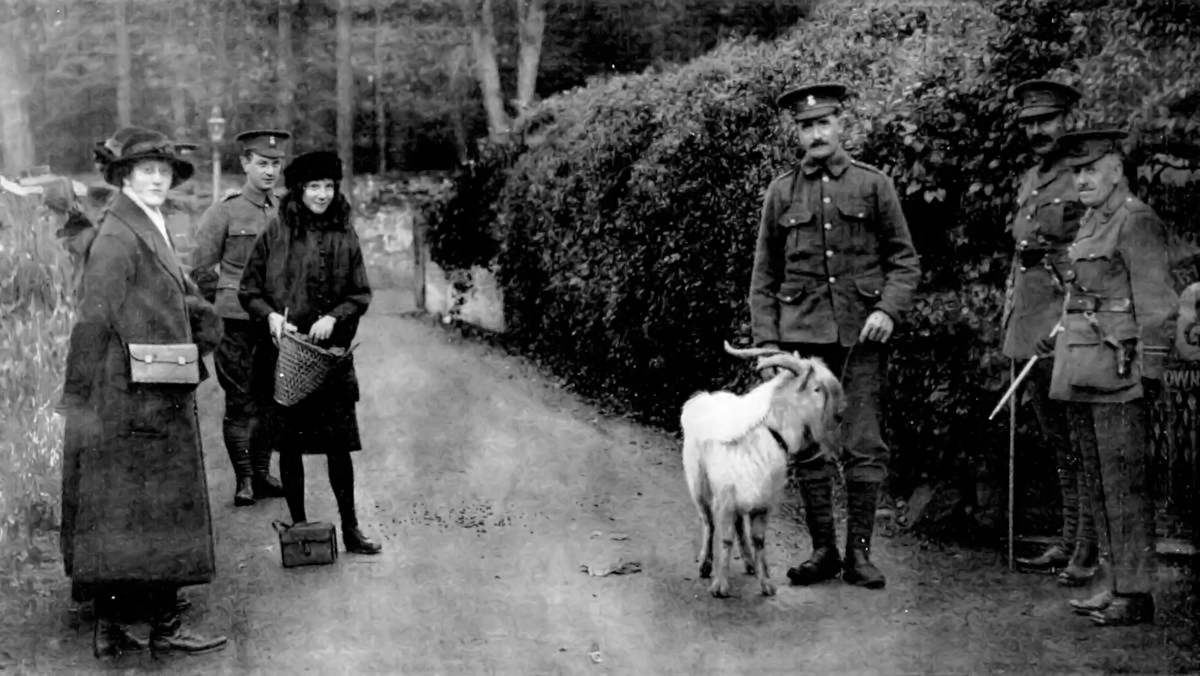
A white goat, the traditional mascot of the Royal Welsh Fusiliers, was presented by King George V to the 7th (Reserve) Battalion (soon to be retitled 2/7th Bn) while they were training at Newtown in November 1914. On the left of the photograph are Lady Magdalen Herbert, sister of the Earl of Powis, Deputy lieutenant of Montgomeryshire, and his younger daughter Lady Hermione Herbert.

The 2/7th (Merionethshire & Montgomeryshire) Bn formed at Newtown on 11 September 1914. It was assigned to 203rd (2nd North Wales) Brigade in 68th (2nd Welsh) Division, which began to assemble at Northampton in April 1915. It replaced the 53rd (W) Division at Bedford in July. Training was made difficult by the lack of arms and equipment, and the need to supply drafts to the 1st Line units. At first the men were issued with obsolete .256-in Japanese Ariska rifles for training. In July the battalions were reorganised and the Home Service-only men were transferred to Provisional units (47th Provisional Bn, later 23rd Battalion, Royal Welch Fusiliers, in the case of the RWF's TF battalions). By November the 2nd Line battalions were so weak that their establishment was reduced to 600 men. Late in 1915 the 68th (2nd W) Division's battalions handed over their Japanese rifles to the provisional battalions and were issued with some old Lee–Enfield rifles converted to charger loading.

68th (2nd Welsh) Division was assigned to Home Defence duties and in November 1915 it joined First Army in Central Force. By September 1916 the division was in General Reserve for Central Force, and by May 1917 it had transferred to Northern Army (Home Forces). The battalion absorbed the 2/1st Brecknockshire Battalion of the South Wales Borderers in November 1916. During the winter of 1916–17 the 2/7th RWF was at Wrentham, Suffolk, then from April 1917 at Henham Park in Halesworth, Suffolk, for its summer station. It was disbanded on 12 September 1917 at Halesworth, the personnel being drafted to other units in 203rd Brigade.

=== 3/7th (Merionethshire & Montgomeryshire) Battalion ===
The 3/7th (Merionethshire & Montgomeryshire) Bn formed at Newtown on 5 June 1915. It was redesignated as the 7th (Reserve) (Merionethshire & Montgomeryshire) Bn, RWF, on 8 April 1916 and on 1 September 1916 it was absorbed into the 4th (Reserve) (Denbighshire) Bn, RWF, in the Welsh Reserve Bde at Oswestry.

== Interwar ==
The TF was reconstituted on 7 February 1920 (reorganising as the Territorial Army (TA) the following year) and the 7th (Merioneth & Montgomery) Bn was reformed at the Drill Hall (later The Armoury) at Newtown under the command of Lt-Col Randolph Offley Crewe-Read, DSO, formerly of the South Wales Borderers, who was promoted to Brevet Colonel from 16 February 1924. Once again the battalion formed part of 158th (Royal Welch) Bde in 53rd (Welsh) Division, and it had the 1st Cadet (Newtown County School) Company attached to it.

With the expansion of the TA after the Munich Crisis, the 7th formed a duplicate 10th (Merionethshire & Montgomeryshire) Bn on 1 July 1939.

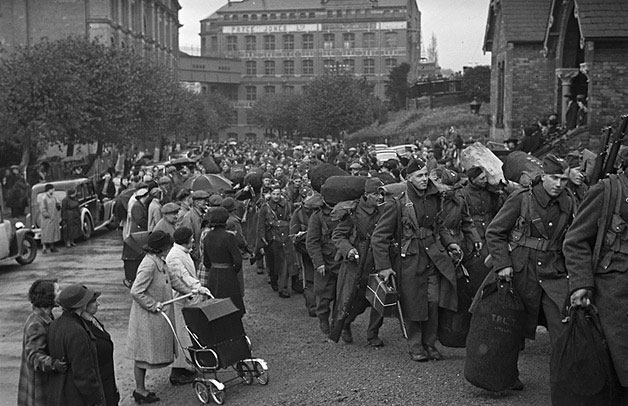
Royal Welch Fusiliers Territorials leaving Newtown, 28 October 1939.

== World War II ==
=== 7th (Merionethshire & Montgomeryshire) Battalion ===
53rd (Welsh) Division mobilised in Western Command on the outbreak of war in September 1939. Parts of the division were sent to Northern Ireland from October 1939, and the whole division was stationed there from 3 April 1940 to 30 April 1941 as part of VI Corps.

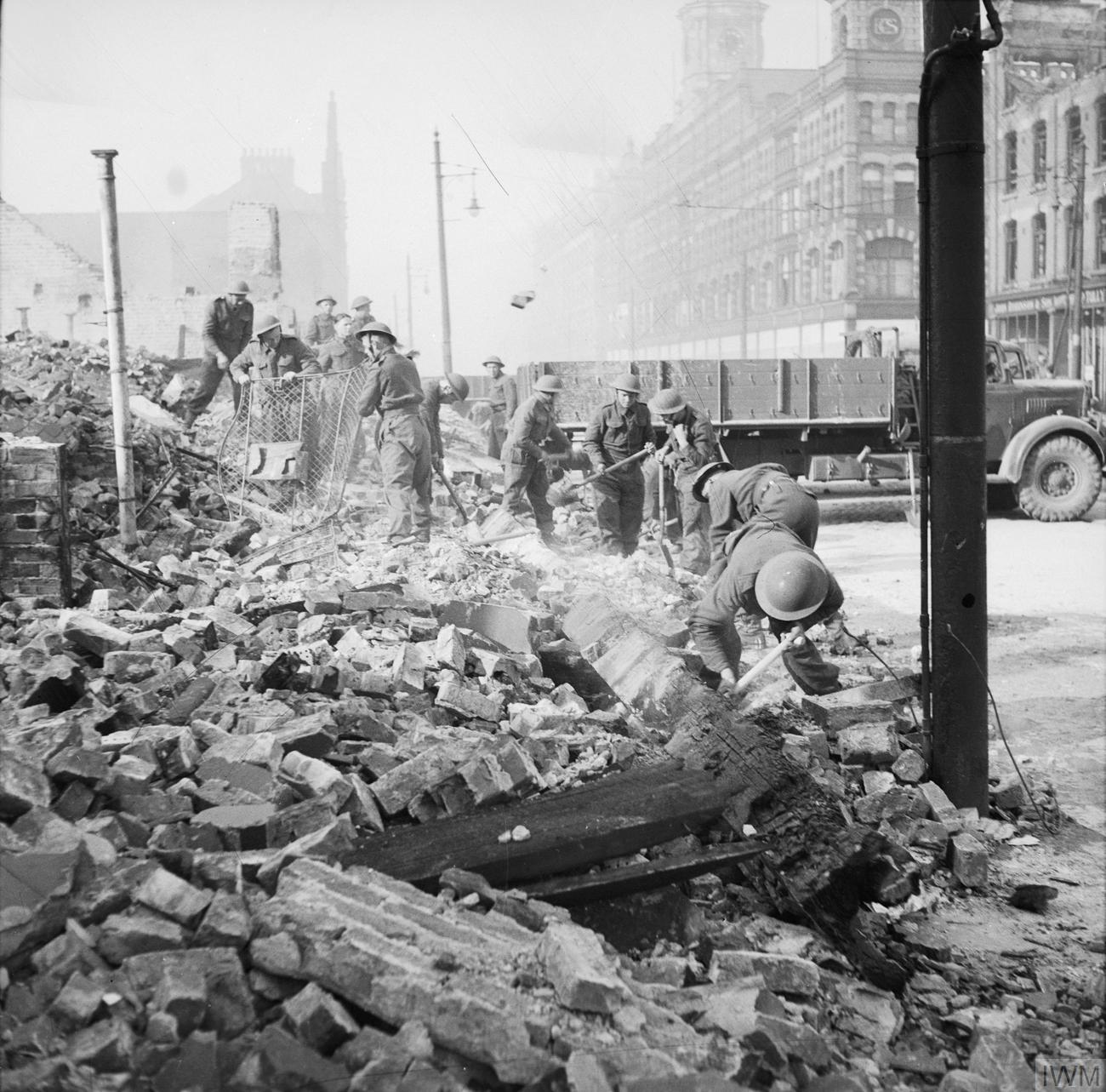
Royal Welch Fusiliers help to clear air raid damage in Belfast, Northern Ireland, 7 May 1941.

On returning to mainland Britain, the division served under III Corps and Western Command. On 8 April 1942 it was assigned to XII Corps District, then from 15 May 1943 in XII Corps it became part of 21st Army Group training for the Allied invasion of Normandy (Operation Overlord).

==== Normandy ====
Formation sign of the 53rd (Welsh) Division, World War II.

53rd (Welsh) Division was not in the first wave landing on D Day; it sailed to Normandy and 158th Bde landed at La Rivière on Gold Beach on 25 June 1944. On the night of 29/30 June the division began moving into 'Scottish Corridor' to relieve the 15th (Scottish) Division, which had battered its way into the enemy lines during the Battle of the Odon (Operation Epsom); the relief was completed on 1/2 July. The division played a minor part in the next offensive phase, Operation Jupiter, guarding the western flank of the attack.

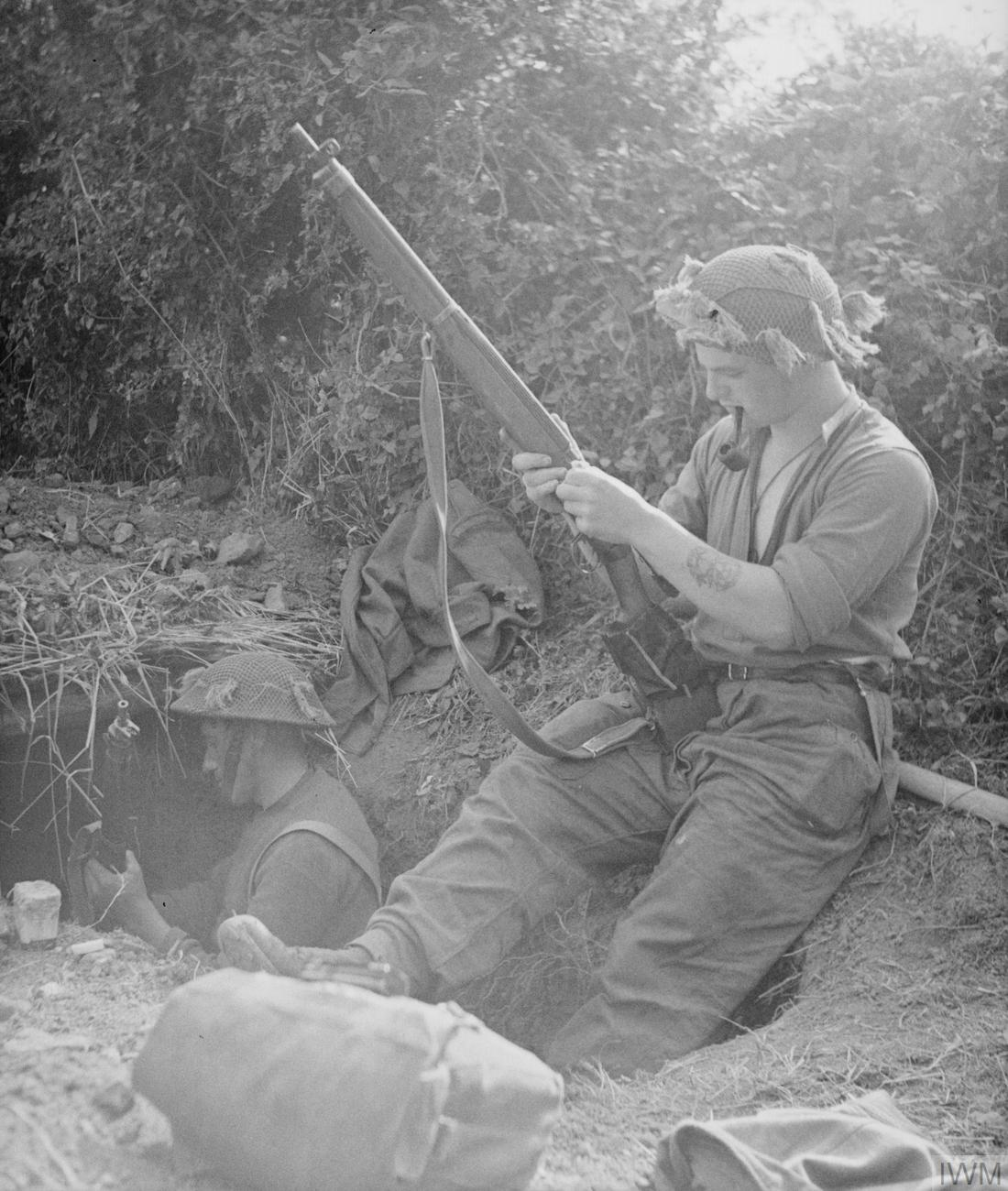
Royal Welch Fusiliers cleaning their rifles before the attack at Évrecy.

Preparatory attacks for Operation Goodwood began on 15 July with XII Corps pushing towards Évrecy. 158th Brigade attacked after dark on 16 July, with the help of Moonlight Batteries, Royal Artillery, providing Movement Light ('Monty's Moonlight'). However, the Germans released smoke, which cancelled out the advantage. At 02.00 next morning 7th RWF crossed the River Guigne, but their anti-tank guns were unable to follow, and dawn found the battalion beyond support and out of touch with the brigade. The attack had to be called off and renewed that evening. 53rd (Welsh) Division captured Cahier, but only held onto it with difficulty against heavy enemy counter-attacks. After 'Goodwood' had failed to break through south of Caen, 53rd (W) Division relieved 15th (S) Division at the le Bon Repos crossroads during the night of 19/20 July. On 21 July the position came under heavy attack by 10th SS Panzer Division, losing some ground and suffering heavy casualties.

When the breakout from the Normandy beachhead began in early August, XII Corps began pushing south, with 53rd (W) Division clearing the east bank of the River Orne, while XXX Corps captured Mont Pinçon. 21st Army Group then endeavoured to close the northern side of the Falaise Gap to prevent the Germans escaping eastwards. By 18–19 August the division was in defensive positions west of Falaise, and on 20 August it captured Bazoches-au-Houlme.

After the Falaise Pocket was eliminated, XII and XXX Corps led 21st Army Group's rapid advance eastwards to the Seine. 15th (Scottish) Division seized bridgeheads on 27 August, and because the armour was not ready it was 53rd (W) Division that led the advance out of the bridgehead towards the Somme. By 30 August 53rd (W) Division was motoring forward with an open flank, but ran into a lot of scattered opposition. The Somme was crossed on 1 September. Opposition stiffened as the division pushed through La Bassée and Béthune on 3 September, but 7th Armoured Division bypassed this opposition and drove on while 53rd (W) Division stayed to 'mop up'. On 4 September the division cleared St Pol and was working its way through the canal area west of Lille. By 6 September 21 Army Group's advance had been halted at the lines of the Albert Canal and the Escaut Canal, where it regrouped.

==== North West Europe ====
XII Corps had a relatively minor role in Operation Market Garden, XXX Corps' attempt to 'bounce' a succession of bridges as far as Arnhem on the Rhine. However, 53rd (W) Division was engaged in heavy fighting to cross the Junction Canal and then clear the Wilhelmina Canal on XXX Corps' left flank. After the failure at Arnhem, the division continued to push forwards in Operation Pheasant, capturing 's-Hertogenbosch on 26 October after five days of hard fighting. It was then moved south to face the 'Venlo Pocket' along the west bank of the River Maas. When the Germans launched a major counter-offensive in the Ardennes (the Battle of the Bulge) in December 1944, 53rd (W) Division was among the formations sent by 21st Army Group to reinforce the northern flank of the 'Bulge'. 7th Battalion suffered heavy casualties in the Forest of Hampteau before the German offensive was stemmed. The division later reclaimed much of the lost ground despite enemy counter-attacks.

The Allied offensive was renewed in February 1945. 53rd (Welsh) Division was now in XXX Corps, which was tasked with clearing the Reichswald in Operation Veritable. This saw some of the most bitter fighting of the campaign, amid mud and mines. 53rd (W) Division's experience fighting through the Reichswald itself to Goch and Weeze was described by Lt-Gen Brian Horrocks, XXX Corps' commander, as 'one of the most unpleasant weeks of the war'. 7th Battalion suffered particularly badly at Höst, near Goch. Having cleared the west bank of the Rhine, 21st Army Group stormed across the river on 23/24 March in Operation Plunder. 53rd (Welsh) Division crossed into the bridgehead on 26 March for the breakout, and then continued its advance across Germany to the River Elbe against stiff opposition.

7th (Merionethshire & Montgomeryshire) Bn transferred to 56th Brigade in 49th (West Riding) Division on 28 April 1945, and the German surrender at Lüneburg Heath on 7 May saw the battalion serving in the Netherlands. It was placed in suspended animation on 28 February 1946.

=== 10th (Merionethshire & Montgomeryshire) Battalion ===
Formation sign of the 38th (Welsh) Division, World War II.

At the outbreak of war 10th RWF had been assigned to 115th Bde in 38th (Welsh) Infantry Division, the 2nd Line duplicate of 53rd (Welsh) Division. The division was still forming when war broke out and only assumed full control of its units on 18 September. It remained training in South Wales during the early part of the war, then moved to North West England under III Corps. By May 1941 it was in reserve just behind the invasion-threatened coast of Sussex. However, at the end of the year it was placed on a lower establishment, as a static coast defence formation with no prospect of active service overseas.

10th Royal Welch Fusiliers remained in 115th Bde until 25 July 1942, when it was converted into 6th (Royal Welch) Parachute Battalion and joined 2nd Parachute Brigade in 1st Airborne Division.

=== 6th (Royal Welch) Parachute Battalion ===
Cap badge of the Parachute Regiment.

2nd Parachute Brigade trained in the UK and then went by sea to North Africa, where it arrived too late to see action in the final stages of the Tunisian campaign. During the Allied invasion of Sicily (Operation Husky) in July 1943 the brigade was intended to drop to capture crossings of the River Mulinello and the northern outskirts of the port of Augusta, but there were insufficient aircraft and the brigade's drop was cancelled.

For the invasion of mainland Italy 1st Airborne Division landed by sea at Taranto in Operation Slapstick, beginning on 9 September 1943. 2nd Parachute Brigade sailed direct from North Africa. There was no opposition to the landings, but 6th Parachute Bn was still aboard HMS Abdiel on 10 September when she struck a mine while swinging at anchor: 58 men of the battalion were among 120 soldiers killed, with another 120 troops wounded.

When 1st Airborne Division returned to the UK later in 1943, 2nd Parachute Bde, including 6th Para Bn, remained in Italy as an independent formation. It supported 2nd New Zealand Division in the fighting at Orsogna in the Bernhardt Line in December and took part in active patrolling through the winter. The brigade formed part of X Corps for the final attacks on Monte Cassino in May 1944.

A 61-man detachment of 6th Para was dropped for a raid behind German lines on 1 June (Operation Hasty). It failed to prevent the Germans from destroying important bridges and fewer than half the group made it back to Allied lines, but they had caused the diversion of a full brigade of German troops for a week to hunt them down.

At the end of July 2 Parachute Bde was assigned to the US Seventh Army for Operation Dragoon, the Allied landings in Southern France; it was the only British formation involved in the operation. The brigade's role as part of 'Rugby Force' was to conduct a parachute drop around Le Muy, 20 miles (32 km) inland from the beaches. The drop on 15 August was partly scattered, but the brigade took all its objectives by the end of the day. It was withdrawn by sea to Italy on 28 August.

Planning was already under way for Operation Manna, to land British troops in Greece after the withdrawal of occupying German forces. This was to include dropping 2nd Parachute Bde ahead of landing a small seaborne force ('Arkforce'). 2nd Parachute Bde concentrated at Taranto in September, and after confirmation of the German withdrawal it was dropped at Megara airfield over 14–17 October. 6th Parachute Bn was then attached to Arkforce for security duties at Athens. Clashes between opposing Greek factions broke out in December (the Dekemvriana) and the paratroops became involved in fighting with the Greek People's Liberation Army (ELAS). ELAS had been suppressed by 15 January 1945, when a ceasefire was signed, and 2nd Parachute Bde left Greece by sea on 28 January.

2nd Parachute Brigade was required in Italy, but its return had been delayed by the ELAS uprising. General Sir Richard McCreery, commanding Eighth Army, wanted to drop the brigade to unsettle the German defenders and ease the capture of the Argenta Gap in Operation Grapeshot. In the event it was not used, and a further 25 other operations for the brigade were planned and then cancelled. Finally the Surrender of Caserta ended the war in Italy on 25 April 1945 before the brigade saw further action.

2nd Parachute Brigade as shipped back to the UK in June 1945 to join 6th Airborne Division, which was earmarked to go to India in December to prepare for the planned 1946 campaign against Japan. However, the Surrender of Japan in August 1945 ended these plans. 6th (Royal Welch) Parachute Bn was amalgamated with 4th Parachute Bn in 1946 and disbanded in 1948. The 10th (Merionethshire & Montgomeryshire) Bn, RWF, had been officially placed in suspended animation in July 1946.

== Postwar ==
When the TA was reconstituted on 1 January 1947, 10th Bn was re-absorbed and 7th Bn was transferred to the Royal Artillery (RA) and reformed at Newtown as 636 (Royal Welch) Light Anti-Aircraft Regiment, RA. It formed part of 95 (Anti-Aircraft) Army Group Royal Artillery based in Newport, Monmouthshire, (which became 95 AA Brigade in 1948).

Anti-Aircraft Command was disbanded on 10 March 1955 and there were wholesale mergers among the TA's AA units: 636 LAA Rgt amalgamated with 635 (Royal Welch) LAA Rgt (the former 6th (Caernarvon & Anglesey) Bn, RWF) as 446 (Royal Welch) Airborne LAA Rgt. However it was converted back to infantry on 1 July the following year as 6th/7th Battalion, Royal Welch Fusiliers. When the TA was reorganised into the Territorial and Army Volunteer Reserve (TAVR) on 1 April 1967 the battalion was reduced to three companies (A and C at Caernarfon, B at Aberystwyth), but supplied some personnel to A (RWF) Company in the Welsh Volunteers, TAVR. Then on 1 April 1969 the battalion was reduced to a cadre in the Welsh Volunteers but also formed D (RWF) Company in the regiment. When the Welsh Volunteers were disbanded on 1 April 1971, A and D (RWF) Companies transferred to a new 3rd (Volunteer) Bn, Royal Welch Fusiliers. This battalion contained the successor units of all four original Territorial battalions of the RWF. On 1 July 1999 it was amalgamated with the 2nd (V) Bn, Royal Regiment of Wales, to form the Royal Welsh Regiment. The Royal Welsh in turn became the 3rd Battalion of the amalgamated regiment of Wales, the Royal Welsh, on 1 March 2006.

== Heritage and ceremonial ==
=== Honorary colonels ===
The following served as Honorary Colonel of the battalion:

- Sir Edward Pryce-Jones, 1st Baronet, TD, founding CO, appointed 18 September 1908
- Sir H.L. Watkin Williams-Wynn, 7th Baronet, TD, from the Montgomeryshire Yeomanry, appointed 12 May 1923

=== Uniforms and insignia ===
The Montgomeryshire Rifle Volunteers wore Rifle green uniforms with black Patent leather accoutrements, except the 3rd (Welshpool) RVC which initially wore 'Volunteer grey' but may have changed to green once it joined the 1st Admin Bn. An officer's button of the 1st (Newtown) RVC from about 1860 shows the Welsh Dragon surrounded by a crowned Garter belt inscribed '1st NEWTOWN RIFLE' with 'VOLUNTEERS' on a scroll underneath. The Shako and pouch-belt plates and officers waistbelt clasps all have the dragon inside a crowned circular scroll inscribed '1st MONTGOMERYSHIRE RIFLE VOLUNTEERS'. An officer's pouch-belt plate of the 2nd (Welshpool) RVC of the same period has crossed Leeks and the numeral 2 within a crowned circular scroll inscribed '2nd MONTGOMERYSHIRE RIFLES'. The scroll is within an oak wreath, the arms of which are linked at the bottom by a scroll reading 'VOLUNTEERS'. A similar design probably appeared on the 2nd RVC's shako plates.

The uniform of the 5th VB, South Wales Borders, was scarlet with the white facings of a line infantry regiment. The red shoulder straps were embroidered with '5' over 'V' over 'SWB'. The plate on the full-dress Home Service helmet bore the Welsh Dragon passant inside a circular scroll inscribe '5th VOLR. BATTN. SOUTH WALES BORDERERS', the whole surrounded by an open wreath and mounted on an eight-pointed star. The SWB other ranks' cap badge of a sphinx surrounded by a wreath of immortelles and laurel, with the letters 'SWB' on the lower part of the wreath, was modified with the letters '5VB' on the upper part. In 1905 the SWB was authorised to resume its traditional grass green facings. When the TF was formed and the unit transferred to become 7th Bn Royal Welsh Fusiliers, it adopted that regiment's blue facings on the full dress scarlet tunic.

In 1908 Regimental Colours were authorised for TF battalions, the 7th Bn's carrying the single Battle Honour South Africa 1900–01. In 1925 TA battalions were allowed to add the battle honours of their parent regiments; in addition the RWF battalions were granted the privilege of wearing the regiment's back flash (five black ribbons below the back of the collar).

When reformed as AA artillery the regiment wore 95 (AA) AGRA's formation sign of a blue shield with a blue silhouette of an aircraft in a white semi-circle at the top, below which was an upright red shell decorated with a blue fuze and driving bands, all representing an AA shell in flight towards its target, an aircraft in the clouds.

In 1953 the LAA regiment was authorised to resume the black five-ribboned RWF flash below the back collar of the No 1 dress and battledress, as well as the RWF cap badge and buttons.

=== Memorials ===
The RWF's regimental memorial for World War I and World War II, a sculpted group by Sir William Goscombe John, stands at the junction of Bodhyfryd and Chester roads in Wrexham.

6th (Royal Welch) Parachute Bn has two memorials: a bronze plaque on the wall of St Mary's Church, Dolgellau, and a carved pew end in the Royal Garrison Church, Aldershot. Both feature a rampant Welsh dragon in addition to the Parachute Regiment cap badge.
