= Wrentham Hall =

Now-demolished manor house in Suffolk, England

Coordinates: 52.394°N 1.656°E

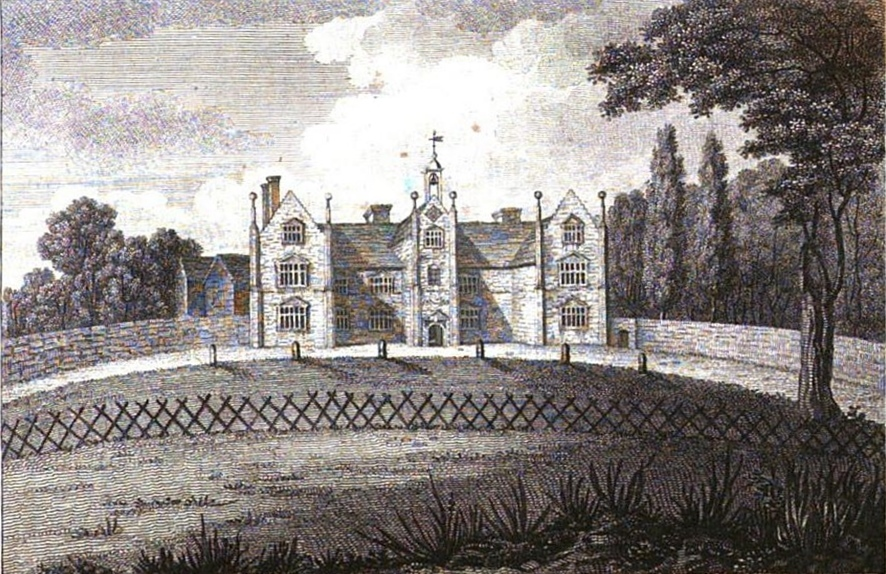
Former Wrentham Hall

Wrentham Hall was a large now-demolished Manor House to the north-west of the village of Wrentham, Suffolk, England and which stood on what is now Blackmoor Farm.

The Tudor brick mansion of Wrentham Hall (now lost) is said to have been built around 1550 by Humphrey Brewster, Esq. (c. 1527–1593), the elder son of Robert Brewster (of a well-established Suffolk family) and his wife, daughter of Sir Christopher Edmonds of Cressing Temple, Essex. If so, he did not then hold the manor in chief. The lordship of Wrentham Southall, or Perpounds, belonged to Thomas Fiennes, 9th Baron Dacre (executed in 1541) and passed from his widow Lady Mary (Neville) to her son Gregory Fiennes, 10th Baron Dacre, who had licence to alienate the manor to trustees in 1571. So it became vested in his cousin Henry Norris, 1st Baron Norreys, who in 1576 had licence to alienate it to Humphrey Brewster. Brewster appears as lord of the manor of Wrentham Southall in a Chancery action brought by Thomas Butts in the time of Queen Elizabeth. The lordship of Wrentham Northall, or Poinings, belonged to Sir Thomas Radcliffe, 3rd Earl of Sussex, until 1567, when he sold it to Arthur Choute, who sold it to Humphrey Brewster in 1577.

The Hall was built to a conventional Elizabethan E-plan. It passed down in the Brewster family from Humphrey to his son Francis (1566–1644) and from Francis to his son Robert Brewster (1599–1633), a Parliamentary commissioner during the Civil War and MP for both Dunwich and Suffolk. From Robert it passed to his son Francis (1623–1671), also MP for both constituencies, and then, Francis having no sons, to Francis' brother Robert (died 1681). After several more generations, it descended to Humphrey Brewster, who died unmarried in 1797. This is from The Gentlemen's Magazine 1797. Death In Dean Street Soho Humphrey Brewster esq of Wrentham Hall Suffolk, by a pistol Previous to this act he called for a glass of wine and water and had a second pistol grasped in his hand in case the first had failed He survived the fatal shot a few minutes. He was a bachelor who led a very solitary life and seemed of a gloomy disposition. He was much respected by his friends and left considerable property behind him infirm and just recovered from a fit of illness. John Wilkinson a lawyer from Hailsworth is one of the Main benefactors of the will. He Built Holton Hall John Wilkinson dies in 1818. His son John Brewster Wilkinson Dies in 1862 without issue. The last of the Brewsters

The hall and its land were soon afterwards sold to Sir Thomas Gooch, 4th Baronet of Benacre Hall, who auctioned the contents and demolished the hall in 1810.
