= HMS Wrentham =

Minesweeper of the Royal Navy

History

United Kingdom
- Name: HMS Wrentham
- Namesake: Wrentham
- Builder: Dorset Yacht Company
- Launched: 8 February 1955
- Completed: 6 July 1955
- Fate: Sold August 1966

General characteristics
- Class & type: Ham-class minesweeper
- Notes: Pennant number(s): M2779 / IMS79

HMS Wrentham was one of 93 ships of the Ham-class of inshore minesweepers.

Their names were all chosen from villages ending in -ham. The minesweeper was named after Wrentham in Suffolk. In 1966 it was sold to Divecon International for conversion as North Sea Diving Service Vessel.
