= Thomas Lane (17th-century MP) =

English lawyer & politician (1582–1652)

Thomas Lane (1582 – 31 December 1652) was an English lawyer and politician who sat in the House of Commons variously between 1625 and 1648.

== Career ==
Lane was educated at Clifford's Inn and was a bencher of the Inner Temple and lord of the manor of Greenford Parva.

In 1625 Lane was elected Member of Parliament for Wycombe and was re-elected in 1628. After an eleven-year period during which King Charles I ruled without parliaments, Lane was re-elected for Wycombe in April 1640 for the Short Parliament. He was re-elected in November 1640 to the Long Parliament and remained supporting the parliamentarian cause until ejected under Pride's Purge in 1648.

== Early life and family ==
Lane was born in Hughenden, Buckinghamshire and baptised there on 2 January 1583. According to Heralds visitations, he was descended from the "Lane family of Thingdon and Orlingbury" in Northamptonshire.

He married twice but had no children. His second wife was Jane Duncombe, daughter of John Duncombe of East Claydon, Buckinghamshire.

Lane died at the age of 70 and a memorial exists in the church of Greenford Parva (or Perivale). His will was proved on 10 May 1653.

Parliament of England
Preceded by Henry Coke	Member of Parliament for Wycombe; 1625; With: Henry Coke	Succeeded by Henry Coke; Edmund Waller
Preceded by Henry Coke; Edmund Waller	Member of Parliament for Wycombe; 1628–1629; With: Sir William Borlase	Parliament suspended until 1640
Parliament suspended since 1629	Member of Parliament for Wycombe; 1640–1648; With: Sir Edmund Verney 1640–1642; Richard Browne 1645–1648	Unrepresented in the Barebones Parliament
