= Richard Godfrey (died 1642) =

English politician

Richard Godfrey (1592–1642), of New Romney, Kent, was an English politician.

He was a Member (MP) of the Parliament of England for New Romney in 1624, 1625 and 1626.

He was the son of Thomas Godfrey of Lydd and his third wife Elizabeth Allard, daughter of Richard Allard of Biddenden. He was educated at St. John's College, Cambridge and entered the Middle Temple. Afterwards, he spent some time travelling abroad with a party of friends.

He was not a very active MP, although he earned some praise for his willingness to sit in the Commons without wages. The most memorable event of his life was when he accidentally killed a man during target practice in 1625, for which he received a royal pardon. Romney Corporation was advised that it was entitled notwithstanding the pardon to seize his goods but declined to do so, as Godfrey, if not a very active MP, was personally well-regarded.

He married Mary Moyle, daughter of John Moyle of Buckwell, and had eight sons and eight daughters. He was the great-grandfather of the noted writer Sir Richard Steele, through his eldest daughter Elizabeth who married Sir William Steele, Lord Chancellor of Ireland.
