= Anthony Ashley Cooper, 1st Earl of Shaftesbury =

English statesman and founder of the Whig party (1621–1683)

The Right Honourable The Earl of Shaftesbury PC FRS
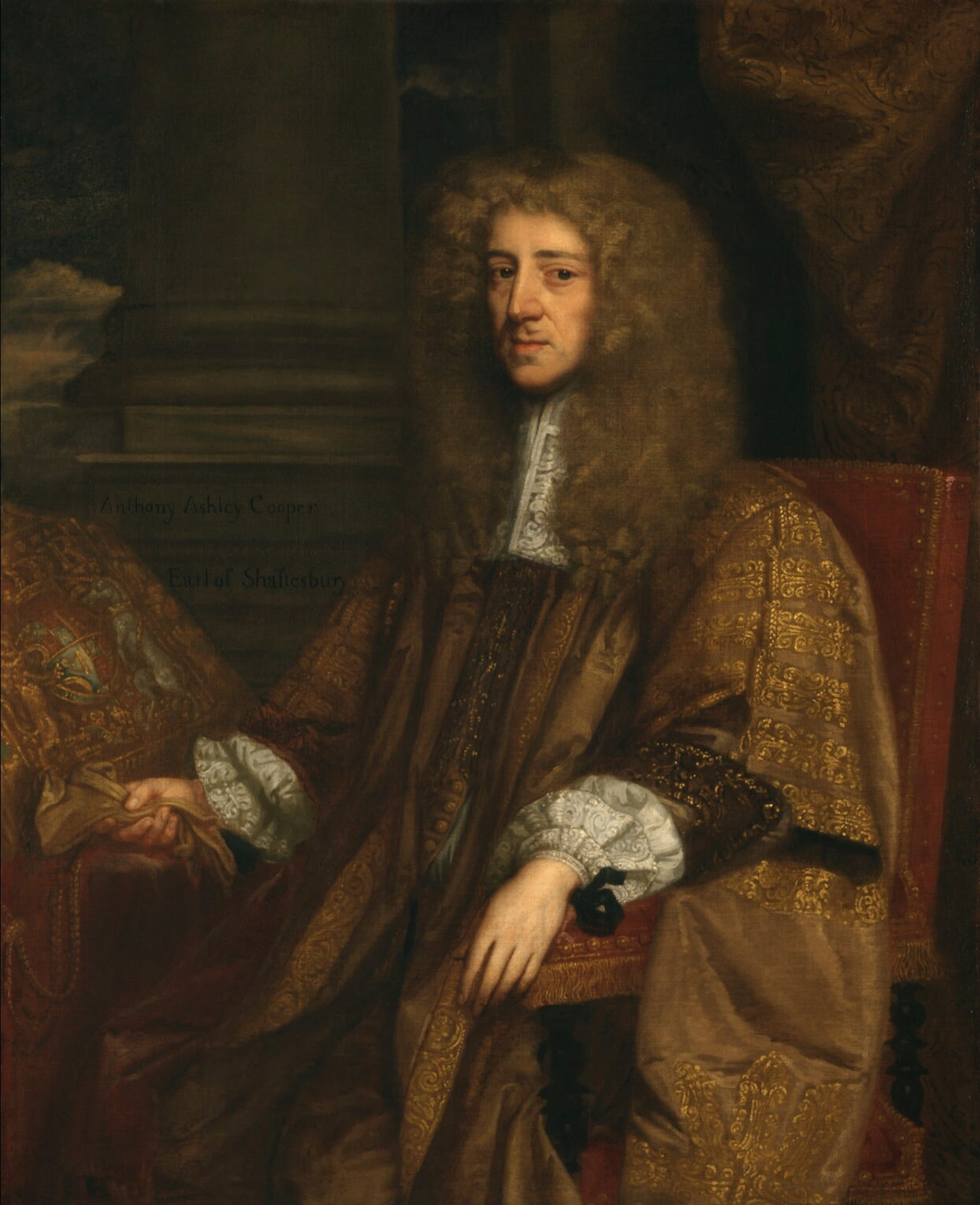
- Portrait by John Greenhill, c. 1672–1673

Lord President of the Council
- In office 21 April 1679 – 15 October 1679

Lord Lieutenant of Dorset
- In office 1672–1674

President of the Board of Trade
- In office 16 September 1672 – 1676

Lord Chancellor
- In office 1672–1673

Chancellor of the Exchequer
- In office 13 May 1661 – 22 November 1672

Governor of the Isle of Wight
- In office 1660–1661

English Council of State
- In office July 1653 – December 1654

Member of Parliament for Wiltshire
- In office April 1653 – December 1660

High Sheriff of Wiltshire
- In office 1647–1648

Personal details
- Born: Anthony Ashley-Cooper; 22 July 1621 Wimborne St Giles, Dorset, England
- Died: 21 January 1683 (aged 61) Amsterdam, Dutch Republic
- Spouse(s): Margaret Coventry (1639–1649, her death); Frances Cecil (1650–1654, her death); Margaret Spencer (1655–1683, his death)
- Children: Anthony Ashley-Cooper, 2nd Earl of Shaftesbury (1652–1699)
- Education: Exeter College, Oxford

Military service
- Rank: Colonel
- Battles/wars: First English Civil War; Capture of Wareham; Capture of Abbotsbury; Capture of Shaftesbury; Relief of Taunton

Anthony Ashley-Cooper, 1st Earl of Shaftesbury PC FRS (22 July 1621 – 21 January 1683), was an English statesman. He held senior political office under both the Commonwealth of England and Charles II, serving as Chancellor of the Exchequer from 1661 to 1672 and Lord Chancellor from 1672 to 1673. During the Exclusion Crisis (1679–1681), Ashley-Cooper headed the movement to bar the Catholic heir, James II, from the royal succession, which is often seen as the origin of the Whig party. He was the first patron of John Locke, who, when they met was a quiet Oxford don and practising physician; as part of Ashley-Cooper's household and retinue for 15 years, Locke became a major political philosopher.

During the Wars of the Three Kingdoms, Ashley-Cooper initially supported the Royalists, before joining the Parliamentarians in 1644. He served on the English Council of State under the English Commonwealth, although he opposed Oliver Cromwell's attempt to rule without Parliament during the Rule of the Major-Generals (1655–1657). He backed the Stuart Restoration in May 1660, and was raised to the peerage of England as Lord Ashley by Charles II.

Ashley-Cooper was a notable financier of the African slave trade, investing in both the Company of Royal Adventurers and the Royal African Company, and serving as the Company's Sub-Governor for its first two years. He was an investor for 14 years and across 120 slave crossings. He was also instrumental in enshrining slavery into the North American Fundamental Constitutions of Carolina.

After the political fall in 1667 of Edward Hyde, 1st Earl of Clarendon, Lord Ashley became one of five members of the so-called Cabal ministry and was created Earl of Shaftesbury in 1672. In 1673, it became widely known that Charles's brother and heir James had secretly converted to Catholicism. As with many English Protestants of the period, Ashley-Cooper saw Catholicism as closely linked to "arbitrary government", and thus the prospect of a Catholic monarch as a threat to the rule of Parliament. (Note: During a Parliamentary debate in April 1679, Sir Henry Capel summarised this viewpoint by saying "From popery came the notion of a standing army and arbitrary power... but lay popery flat, and there's an end of arbitrary government and power. It is a mere chimera, or notion, without popery.)

His sponsorship of the Exclusion Bill in 1679 led to two years of political struggle, but ultimately ended in defeat. During the subsequent Tory reaction in 1681, Ashley-Cooper was arrested for high treason, a prosecution dropped several months later. Fearing re-arrest and execution, which was the fate of other opponents of the King, in 1682 he went into exile in Amsterdam, where he died in January 1683.

== Biography ==
=== Early life and first marriage, 1621–1640 ===
Location of Dorset in England. Anthony Ashley-Cooper was born in Dorset in 1621, and he would maintain important links with the county throughout his political career.

Ashley-Cooper was the eldest son and successor of Sir John Cooper, 1st Baronet, of Rockbourne in Hampshire, and his mother was the former Anne Ashley, daughter and sole heiress of Sir Anthony Ashley, 1st Baronet. He was born on 22 July 1621, at the home of his maternal grandfather Sir Anthony Ashley in Wimborne St Giles, Dorset. He was named Anthony Ashley-Cooper because of a promise the couple had made to Sir Anthony.

Although Sir Anthony Ashley was of minor gentry stock, he had served as Secretary at War in the reign of Queen Elizabeth I (d.1603). In 1622, two years after the death of his first wife, Sir Anthony Ashley married the 19-year-old Philippa Sheldon (51 years his junior), a relative of George Villiers, Marquess of Buckingham, thus cementing relations with the most powerful man at court.

Ashley-Cooper's father was created a baronet in 1622, and he represented Poole in the parliaments of 1625 and 1628, supporting the attack on Richard Neile, Bishop of Winchester, for his Arminian tendencies. Sir Anthony Ashley insisted that a man with Puritan leanings, Aaron Guerdon, be chosen as Ashley-Cooper's first tutor.

Ashley-Cooper's mother died in 1628. In the following year his father remarried, this time to the widowed Mary Moryson, one of the daughters of wealthy London textile merchant Baptist Hicks and co-heir of his fortune. Through his stepmother, Ashley-Cooperthus gained an important political connection in the form of her grandson, the future 1st Earl of Essex. Ashley-Cooper's father died in 1630, leaving his son (age 9) a wealthy orphan. Upon his father's death, he inherited his father's baronetcy and was now Sir Anthony Ashley-Cooper.

Ashley-Cooper's father had held his lands in knight-service, so Ashley-Cooper's inheritance now came under the authority of the Court of Wards. The trustees whom his father had appointed to administer his estate, his brother-in-law (Anthony Ashley-Cooper's uncle by marriage), Edward Tooker, and his colleague from the House of Commons, Sir Daniel Norton, purchased Ashley-Cooper's wardship from the king, but they remained unable to settle the estate and sell Ashley-Cooper's land without permission of the Court of Wards, since at his death, Sir John Cooper had left some £35,000 in gambling debts. The Court of Wards ordered the sale of the best of Sir John's lands to pay his debts, with several sales commissioners picking up choice properties at £20,000 less than their market value, a circumstance which led Ashley-Cooper to hate the Court of Wards as a corrupt institution.

Young orphaned Ashley-Cooper was sent to live with his father's trustee Sir Daniel Norton in Southwick, Hampshire (near Portsmouth). Norton had joined in Sir John Cooper's denunciation of Arminianism in the 1628–1629 parliament, and Norton chose a man with Puritan leanings named Fletcher as Ashley-Cooper's tutor.

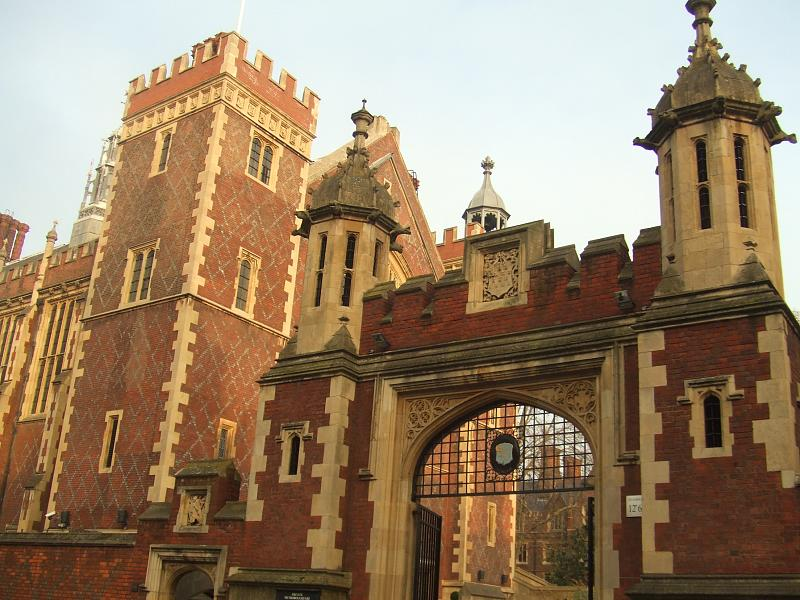
The Gate of Lincoln's Inn. Ashley-Cooper attended Lincoln's Inn, beginning in 1638 at age 17, to receive an education in the laws of England. Throughout his political career, Ashley-Cooper posed as a defender of the rule of law, at various points in his career breaking with both Oliver Cromwell (1599–1658) and Charles II (1630–1685) when he perceived they were subverting the rule of law and introducing arbitrary government.

Ashley-Cooper's trustee Sir Daniel died in 1636, and Ashley-Cooper (age 15) was sent to live with his father's other trustee, Edward Tooker, at Maddington, near Salisbury. Here his tutor was a man with an MA from Oriel College, Oxford.

Ashley-Cooper matriculated at Exeter College, Oxford, on 24 March 1637, aged 15, where he studied under its master, the Regius Professor of Divinity, John Prideaux, a Calvinist with vehemently anti-Arminian tendencies. While there, he fomented a minor riot and left without taking a degree. In February 1638, Ashley-Cooper was admitted to Lincoln's Inn, where he was exposed to the Puritan preaching of chaplains Edward Reynolds and Joseph Caryl.

On 25 February 1639, aged 19, Ashley-Cooper married Margaret Coventry, daughter of Thomas Coventry, 1st Baron Coventry, who was then serving as Lord Keeper of the Great Seal for Charles I. As Ashley-Cooper was still a minor, the young couple moved into Lord Coventry's residences of Durham House in the Strand, and at Canonbury House in Islington.

=== Early political career, 1640–1660 ===
==== Parliament, 1640–1642 ====
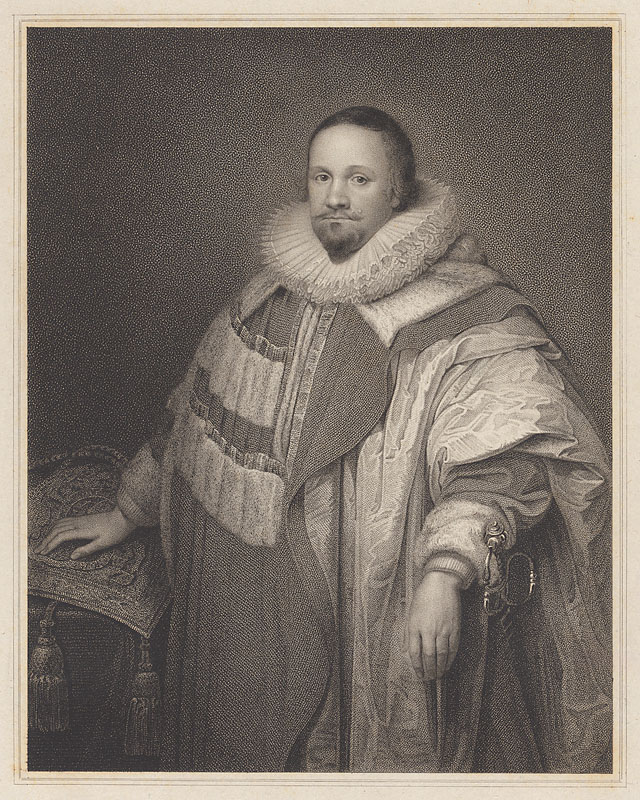
Ashley-Cooper's father-in-law Thomas Coventry, 1st Baron Coventry (1578–1640), who served as Lord Keeper of the Great Seal from 1625 to 1640. Ashley-Cooperfirst entered politics under Lord Coventry's tutelage.

In March 1640, while still a minor, Ashley-Cooper was elected member of parliament for the borough of Tewkesbury, Gloucestershire, in the Short Parliament through the influence of Lord Coventry.

In October 1640, with opinion in the country swinging against the king's supporters (including Coventry), Ashley-Cooper was not asked to stand for election for Tewkesbury in the Long Parliament. He contested, and by some accounts, won a by-election to the seat of Downton in Wiltshire, but Denzil Holles, soon to rise to prominence as a leader of the opposition to the King and a personal rival of Sir Anthony, blocked Ashley-Cooper's admission to the Parliament. It was probably feared that Sir Anthony, as a result of his recent marriage to the daughter of the king's Lord Keeper, would be too sympathetic to the king.

==== Royalist, 1642–1644 ====
When the Civil War began in 1642, Ashley-Cooper initially supported the King (somewhat echoing Holles' concerns). After a period of vacillating, he, at his own expense in the summer of 1643, raised a regiment of foot and a troop of horse for the King, serving as their colonel and captain respectively. Following the Royalist victory at the Battle of Roundway Down on 13 July 1643, Ashley-Cooper was one of three commissioners appointed to negotiate the surrender of Dorchester, at which he negotiated a deal whereby the town agreed to surrender in exchange for being spared plunder and punishment. However, troops under Prince Maurice soon arrived and plundered Dorchester and Weymouth anyway, leading to heated words between Ashley-Cooper and Prince Maurice.

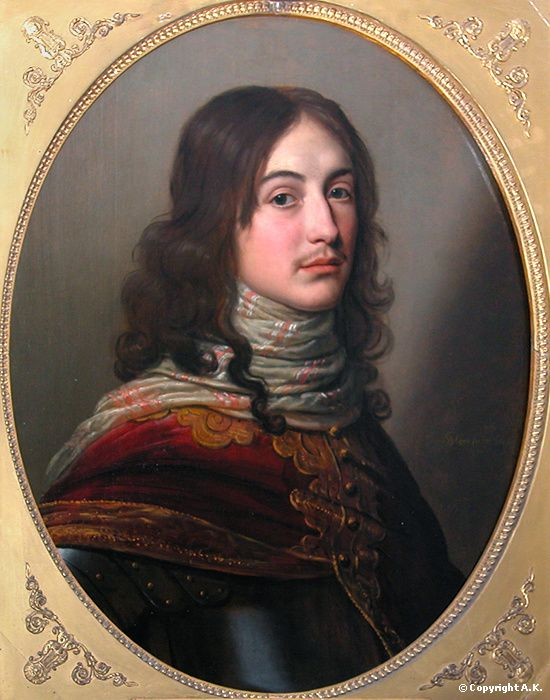
Maurice of the Palatinate (1620–1652), depicted as Mercury. Prince Maurice attempted to block Ashley-Cooper's appointment as governor of Weymouth and Portland.

William Seymour, Marquess of Hertford, the commander of the Royalist forces in the west, had recommended Ashley-Cooper be appointed governor of Weymouth and Portland, but Prince Maurice intervened to block the appointment, on grounds of Ashley-Cooper's youth and alleged inexperience. Ashley-Cooper er appealed to the Chancellor of the Exchequer, Edward Hyde; Hyde arranged a compromise whereby Ashley-Cooper would be appointed as governor but resign as soon as it was possible to do so without losing face. Ashley-Cooper was promised that upon resigning as governor, he would be made High Sheriff of Dorset and president of the council of war for Dorset, both of which were offices more prestigious than the governorship. Ashley-Cooper spent the remainder of 1643 as governor of Weymouth and Portland.

==== Parliamentarian and second marriage, 1644–1652 ====
In early 1644, Ashley-Cooper resigned all of his posts under the king, and travelled to Hurst Castle, the headquarters of the Parliamentarians. Called before the Committee of Both Kingdoms, on 6 March 1644, he explained that he believed that Charles I was now being influenced by Catholics, who were increasingly prominent at Charles's court, and he had recently signed a truce with Irish Catholic rebels) and that he believed Charles had no intention of "promoting or preserving ... the Protestant religion and the liberties of the kingdom" and that he, therefore, believed the parliamentary cause was just, and he offered to take the Solemn League and Covenant.

In July 1644, the House of Commons gave Ashley-Cooper permission to leave London, and he soon joined parliamentary forces in Dorset. After he participated in a campaign in August, parliament appointed him to the committee governing the army in Dorset. Ashley-Cooper participated in fighting throughout 1644. In 1645, with the passing of the Self-denying Ordinance, Ashley-Cooper chose to resign his commissions in the parliamentary army, which was, at this point, being supplanted by the creation of the New Model Army) to preserve his claim to be the rightful member for Downton. He nevertheless continued to be active in the Dorset committee as a civil member.

In this period Ashley-Cooper made his first colonial investment, buying a 105-acre plantation in the English colony of Barbados in 1646, as the island was converting to sugar cultivation worked by enslaved Africans; he sold it in 1655 for £1,020.

Little is known of Ashley-Cooper's activities in the late 1640s. It is often assumed that he supported the Presbyterians against the Independents, and, as such, opposed the regicide of Charles I in January 1649. Nevertheless, he was willing to work with the new regime, accepting a commission as justice of the peace for Wiltshire and Dorset in February 1649 and acting as High Sheriff of Wiltshire for 1647. In February 1650, he not only took the oath of loyalty to the new regime but was a member of a commission that tendered the oath.

Ashley-Cooper's first wife, Margaret, died on 10 July 1649; the couple had had no children. Less than a year later, on 15 April 1650, Ashley-Cooper remarried at age 28, to seventeen-year-old Lady Frances Cecil (1633–1652), daughter of David Cecil, 3rd Earl of Exeter. In their brief marriage, the couple had two children, one of whom, Anthony, lived to adulthood. Lady Frances died on 31 December 1652, aged only 19.

=== Statesman under the Commonwealth of England and the Protectorate, 1652–1660 ===
On 17 January 1652, the Rump Parliament appointed Ashley-Cooper to the committee on law reform chaired by Sir Matthew Hale (the so-called Hale Commission, none of whose moderate proposals were ever enacted).

In March 1653, the Rump issued a full pardon for his time as a Royalist, opening the way for his return to public office. Following the dissolution of the Rump in April 1653, Oliver Cromwell and the Army Council nominated Ashley-Cooper to serve in Barebone's Parliament as member for Wiltshire. On 14 July, Cromwell appointed Ashley-Cooper to the English Council of State, where he was a member of the Committee for the Business of the Law, which was intended to continue the reform work of the Hale Commission. Ashley-Cooper aligned himself with the moderates in Barebone's Parliament, voting against the abolition of tithes. He was one of the members who voted to dissolve Barebone's Parliament on 12 December 1653 rather than acquiesce to the abolition of tithes.

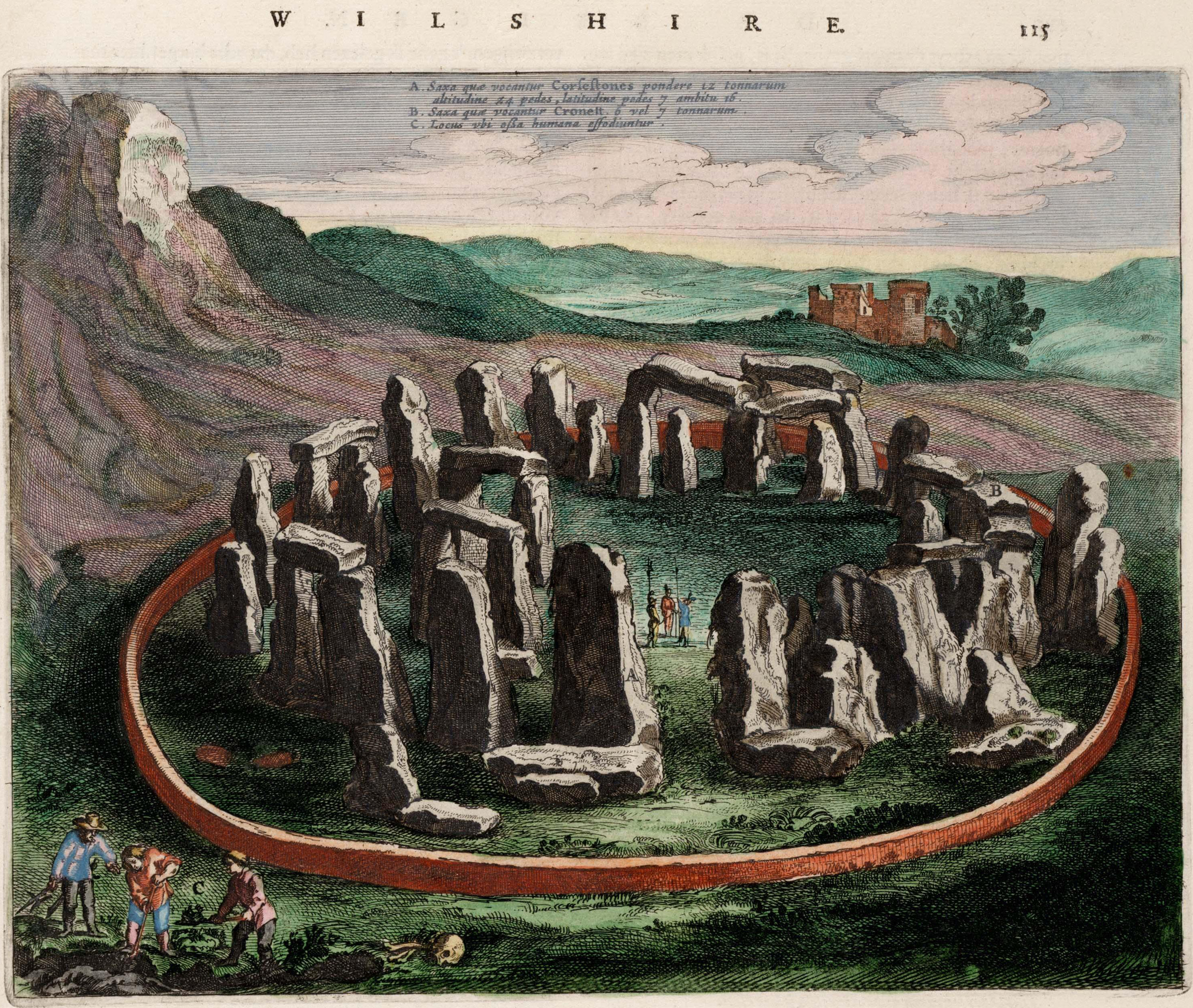
Depiction of Stonehenge in the Atlas van Loon (1649). So many voters turned up for the Wiltshire election in 1654, that the poll had to be switched from Wilton to Stonehenge. Ashley-Cooper won the election.

When the Instrument of Government gave England a written constitution for the first time four days later, Ashley-Cooper was again named to the Council of State. During the elections for the First Protectorate Parliament in summer 1654, Ashley-Cooper headed a slate of ten candidates who stood in Wiltshire against 10 republican MPs headed by Edmund Ludlow. On the day of the election, so many voters turned up that the poll had to be switched from Wilton to Stonehenge. Ashley-Cooper's slate of candidates prevailed, although Ludlow alleged his party was in the majority. At the same election, Ashley-Cooper was also elected MP for Tewkesbury and Poole but chose to sit for Wiltshire. Although Ashley-Cooper was generally supportive of Cromwell during the First Protectorate Parliament (he voted in favour of making Cromwell king in December 1654), he grew worried that Cromwell was increasingly inclined to rule through the Army rather than through Parliament. This led Ashley-Cooper to break with Cromwell: in early January 1655, he stopped attending Council and introduced a resolution in parliament making it illegal to collect or pay revenue not authorised by parliament. Cromwell dissolved this parliament on 22 January 1655.

The exiled Charles II, hearing of Ashley-Cooper's break with Cromwell, wrote to Ashley-Cooper saying that he would pardon Ashley-Cooper for fighting against the Crown if he would now help to bring about a restoration of the monarchy. Ashley-Cooper did not respond, nor did he participate in the Penruddock uprising in March 1655.

On 30 August 1655, Ashley-Cooper married his third wife, Margaret Spencer (1627–1693), daughter of William Spencer, 2nd Baron Spencer of Wormleighton, and sister of Henry Spencer, 1st Earl of Sunderland.

Cooper was again elected as a member for Wiltshire in the Second Protectorate Parliament, although when the parliament met on 17 September 1656, Ashley-Cooper was one of 100 members whom the Council of State excluded from the parliament. Ashley-Cooper was one of 65 excluded members to sign a petition protesting their exclusion that was delivered by Sir George Booth. Ashley-Cooper eventually took his seat in the parliament on 20 January 1658, after Cromwell accepted an amended version of the Humble Petition and Advice that stipulated that the excluded members could return to parliament. Upon his return to the house, Ashley-Cooper spoke out against Cromwell's Other House.

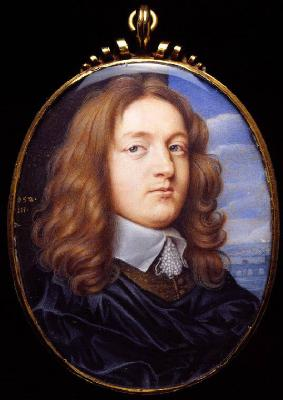
Portrait miniature of Sir Anthony Ashley Cooper by Samuel Cooper

After the death of Oliver Cromwell in September 1658, Ashley-Cooper was elected to the Third Protectorate Parliament in early 1659 as member for Wiltshire. During the debates in this parliament, Ashley-Cooper sided with the republicans who opposed the Humble Petition and Advice and insisted that the bill recognising Cromwell's son Richard Cromwell as Protector should limit his control over the militia and eliminate the protector's ability to veto legislation. Ashley-Cooper again spoke out against the Other House (consisting of new lords), and in favour of restoring the old House of Lords.

When Richard Cromwell dissolved parliament on 22 April 1659 and recalled the Rump Parliament (dissolved by Oliver Cromwell in 1653), Ashley-Cooper attempted to revive his claim to sit as member for Downton. He was also re-appointed to the Council of State at this time. Throughout this period, many accused Ashley-Cooper of harbouring royalist sympathies, but Ashley-Cooper denied this. In August 1659, Ashley-Cooper was arrested for complicity in Sir George Booth's Presbyterian royalist uprising in Cheshire, but in September the Council found him not guilty of any involvement.

In October 1659, the New Model Army dissolved the Rump Parliament and replaced the Council of State with its own Committee of Safety. Ashley-Cooper, republicans Sir Arthur Haselrig and Henry Neville and six other members of the Council of State continued to meet in secret, referring to themselves as the rightful Council of State. This secret Council of State came to see Sir George Monck, commander of the forces in Scotland, as the best hope to restore the Rump. Ashley-Cooper and Haselrig met with Monck's commissioners, urging them to restore the Rump. Ashley-Cooper was involved in several plots to launch pro-Rump uprisings. This proved unnecessary as, on 23 December 1659, troops resolved to stand by the Rump and the Council of State and disobey the Committee of Safety. The Rump Parliament reassembled on 26 December 1659, and on 2 January 1660, Ashley-Cooper was elected to the Council of State. On 7 January 1659, a special committee reported back on the disputed 1640 Downton election and Ashley-Cooper was finally allowed to take his seat as member for Downton.

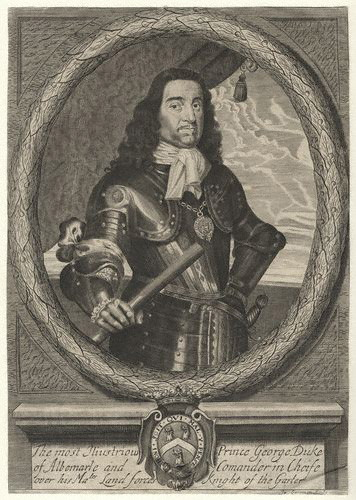
Sir George Monck (1608–1670). In the complicated politics of 1659, Ashley-Cooper was in contact with Monck, encouraging him to march on London and then to recall the Long Parliament, and ultimately restore the English monarchy.

Upon General Monck's march into London, Monck was displeased that the Rump Parliament was not prepared to confirm him as commander-in-chief of the army. At Ashley-Cooper's urging, Monck's troops marched into London, and Monck sent parliament a letter insisting that the vacant seats in the Rump Parliament be filled by by-elections. When the Rump insisted on placing restrictions on who could stand in these by-elections, Ashley-Cooper urged Monck to insist instead on the return of the members of the Long Parliament excluded by Pride's Purge, and Monck obliged on 21 February 1660. Two days later, the restored Long Parliament again elected Ashley-Cooper to the Council of State. On 16 March 1660, the Long Parliament finally voted for its own dissolution.

Beginning in spring 1660, Ashley-Cooper drew closer to the royalist cause. As late as mid-April, he appears to have favoured only a conditional restoration. In April 1660 he was re-elected MP for Wiltshire in the Convention Parliament. On 25 April he voted in favour of an unconditional restoration. On 8 May, the Convention Parliament appointed Ashley-Cooper as one of twelve members to travel to The Hague to invite Charles II to return to England.

=== Restoration politician, 1660–1683 ===
Cooper returned to England with Charles in late May. On the recommendation of General Monck and of Cooper's wife's uncle Thomas Wriothesley, 4th Earl of Southampton, Charles appointed Cooper to his Privy Council on 27 May 1660. Cooper took advantage of the Declaration of Breda and was formally pardoned for his support of the English Commonwealth on 27 June 1660. During this period, he helped reorganise the Privy Council's committee on trade and plantations.

Anthony Ashley Cooper, Earl of Shaftesbury is recorded in the British Slave Traders register, a database of individuals involved in the British slave trade compiled from the surviving records of the Royal African Company and its predecessor. He was an officer of the two chartered companies that carried England's slave trade, and during his association with them they dispatched some 120 slaving voyages between 1663 and 1677. He served as an Assistant of the Royal African Company from 1672 to 1674, and as its Sub-Governor for its first two years (1672–1673). His involvement began with the company's predecessor, the Company of Royal Adventurers Trading into Africa, in which he took a £400 share under the second patent in August 1663 and attended four meetings between 1664 and 1668. He sold £1,600 of Royal African Company stock at a profit in February 1677.

Ashley-Cooper thus became a spokesman for the government in the Convention Parliament. However, during the debates on the Indemnity and Oblivion Bill, Ashley-Cooper urged leniency for those who had sided with Parliament during the English Civil Wars or collaborated with the Cromwellian regime. He argued that only those individuals who had personal involvement in the decision to execute Charles I by participating in his trial and execution should be exempt from the general pardon. This view prevailed. After the Indemnity and Oblivion Act became law on 29 August 1660, Ashley-Cooper sat on the special commission that tried the regicides, and in this capacity took part in sentencing to death several colleagues with whom he had collaborated during the years of the English Interregnum, including Hugh Peters, Thomas Harrison, and Thomas Scot. As a long-time foe of the Court of Wards, during the debate on the Tenures Abolition Bill, Ashley-Cooper supported continuing the excise imposed by the Long Parliament to compensate the crown for the loss of revenues associated with the abolition of the court.

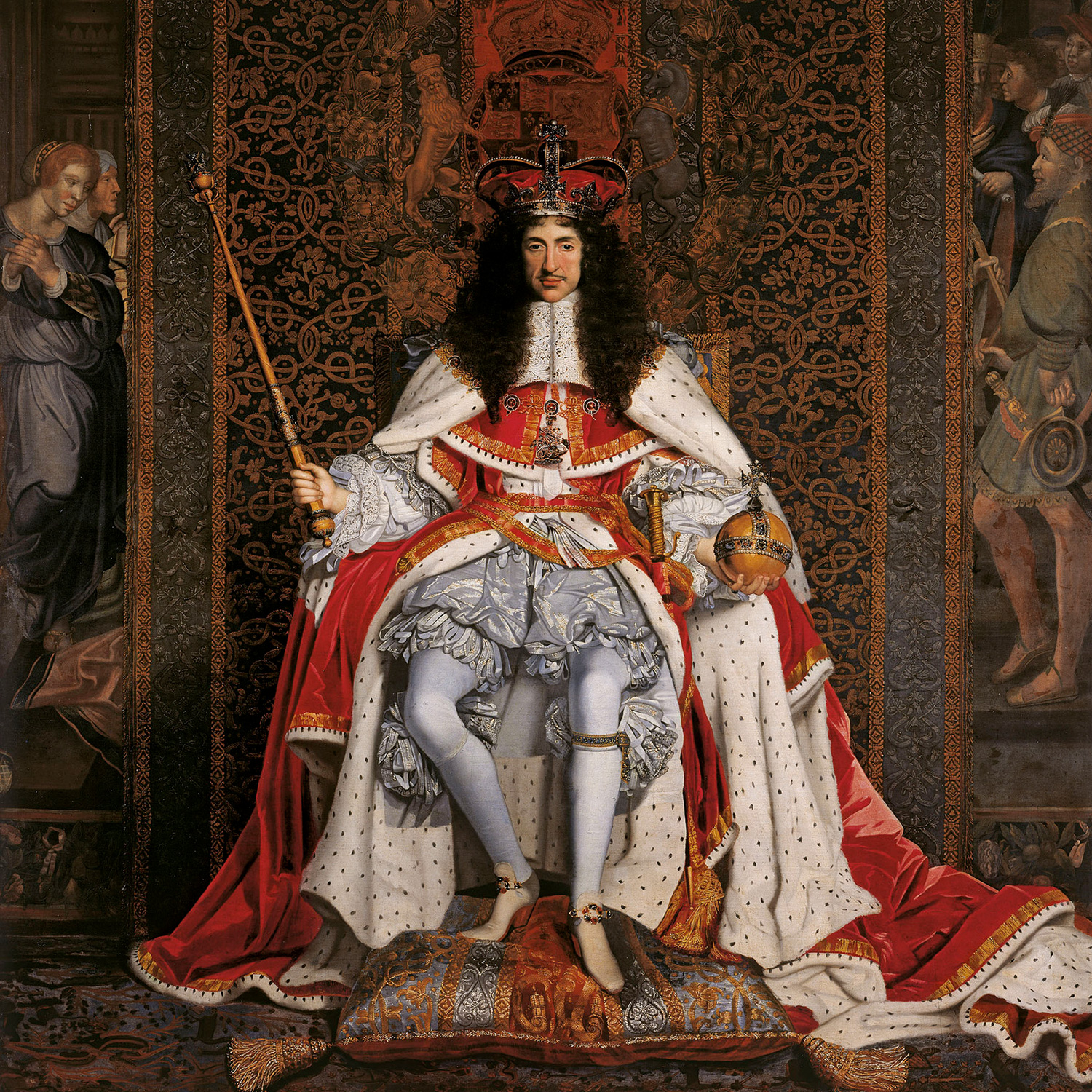
Charles II (1630–1685) in his coronation robes, 1661. Ashley-Cooper was one of twelve members of Parliament who travelled to the Dutch Republic to invite Charles to return to England, and in 1661, Charles created Cooper Lord Ashley.

On 20 April 1661, three days before his coronation at Westminster Abbey, Charles II announced his coronation honours, and in those honours, he created Cooper Baron Ashley, of Wimborne St Giles.

==== Chancellor of the Exchequer, 1661–1672 ====
Following the coronation, the Cavalier Parliament met beginning on 8 May 1661. Lord Ashley took his seat in the House of Lords on 11 May. On 11 May, the king appointed Ashley as his Chancellor of the Exchequer and under-treasurer (Southampton, Ashley's uncle by marriage, was at the time Lord High Treasurer).

In 1661–1662, Ashley opposed Charles's marriage to Catherine of Braganza, a Catholic, because the marriage would involve supporting the Portuguese, and Portugal's ally France, in Portugal's struggle against Spain. Ashley was opposed to a policy that moved England into the French orbit. During this debate, Ashley opposed the policy engineered by Charles's Lord Chancellor, the Earl of Clarendon, thus beginning what would prove to be a long-running political rivalry with Clarendon.

When the Cavalier Parliament set about enacting the Clarendon Code, Ashley supported a policy of moderation towards Protestant dissenters. In July 1662, Ashley sponsored an amendment to the Act of Uniformity that would have allowed Protestant Nonconformists to allow for late subscription, giving moderate dissenters an additional opportunity to conform. In the latter half of 1662, Ashley joined Sir Henry Bennet, the Earl of Bristol, and Lord Robartes in urging Charles to dispense peaceable Protestant Nonconformists and loyal Catholics from the Act of Uniformity. This led to Charles issuing his first Declaration of Indulgence on 26 December 1662. The Cavalier Parliament forced Charles to withdraw this declaration in February 1663. Ashley then supported Lord Robartes' Dispensing Bill, which would have dispensed Protestant Nonconformists, but not Catholics, from the Act of Uniformity. During the debate on the Dispensing Bill in the House of Lords, Ashley criticised Edward Hyde, 1st Earl of Clarendon, Charles's Lord Chancellor, for opposing the royal prerogative to dispense with laws. Clarendon remarked that in his opinion, the declaration was "Ship-Money in religion". The king looked favourably on Ashley's remarks and was displeased by Clarendon's.

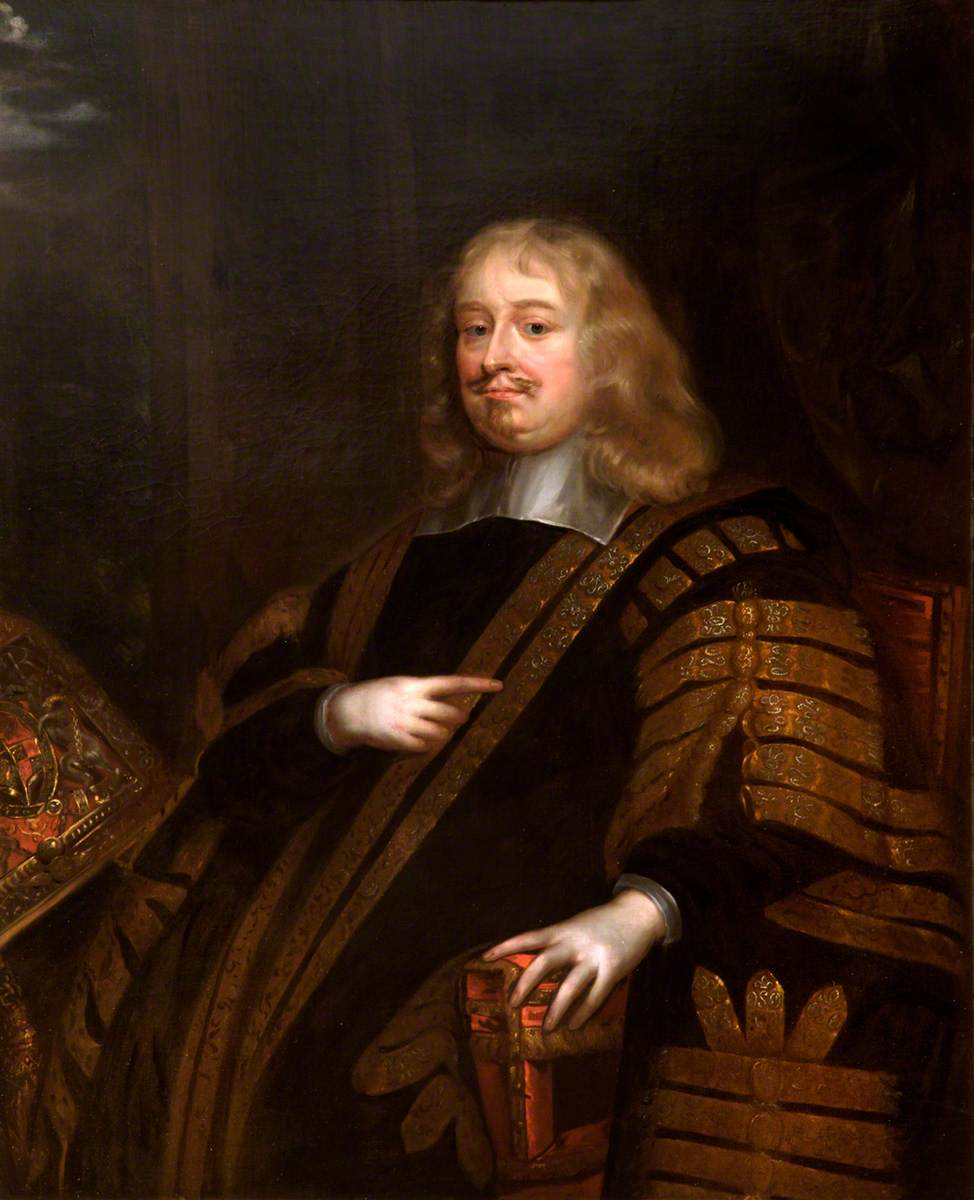
Edward Hyde, 1st Earl of Clarendon (1609–1674), Charles II's Lord Chancellor from 1658 to 1667. Ashley clashed with Clarendon throughout the 1660s, but Ashley refused to support the impeachment of Clarendon in 1667.

In May 1663, Ashley was one of eight Lords Proprietors (Lord Clarendon was one of the others) given title to a huge tract of land in North America, which eventually became the Province of Carolina, named in honour of King Charles. In 1669 Ashley and his secretary John Locke, whom he had met in Oxford in 1666, co-authored a plan for the colony known as the Grand Model for the Province of Carolina, which included the Fundamental Constitutions of Carolina.

The Constitutions provided for a broad measure of religious toleration, but they also entrenched chattel slavery in the colony's founding law and established a hereditary aristocracy over it. Article 110 provided that "every freeman of Carolina shall have absolute power and authority over his negro slaves, of what opinion or religion soever", placing enslaved people wholly outside the document's guarantees of toleration and its protections for freemen; Article 107 added that baptism did not alter a master's dominion over an enslaved person. The aristocratic structure, with its ranks of landgraves and caciques holding fixed shares of the land, was designed to sit above the freeholders whom Article 110 empowered.

By early 1664, Ashley was a member of the circle of John Maitland, 1st Duke of Lauderdale, who ranged themselves in opposition to Lord Clarendon.

During the debate on the Conventicle Bill in May 1664, Ashley proposed mitigating the harshness of the penalties initially suggested by the House of Commons.

Throughout late 1664 and 1665, Ashley was increasingly in the royal favour. For example, in August 1665, the king paid a surprise visit to Ashley at Wimborne St Giles, and, during a later visit, introduced Ashley to his illegitimate son James Scott, 1st Duke of Monmouth.

The Second Anglo–Dutch War began on 4 March 1665 after a Royal Navy squadron seized the Dutch colony of New Netherland. During the parliamentary session of October 1665, Sir George Downing proposed that the use of funds voted to the crown should be restricted to the sole purpose of carrying on the war. Ashley opposed this proposal on the grounds that crown ministers should have flexibility in deciding how to use money received from parliamentary taxation.

During the 1666–1667 parliamentary session Ashley supported the Irish Cattle Bill, introduced by the Duke of Buckingham, which sought to prevent the importation of Irish cattle into England. During the course of this debate, Ashley attacked Charles's Lord Lieutenant of Ireland, James Butler, 1st Duke of Ormonde. He suggested that Irish peers such as Ormonde should have no precedence over English commoners. The debate over the Irish Cattle Bill marks the first time that Ashley began to break with the court over an issue of policy.

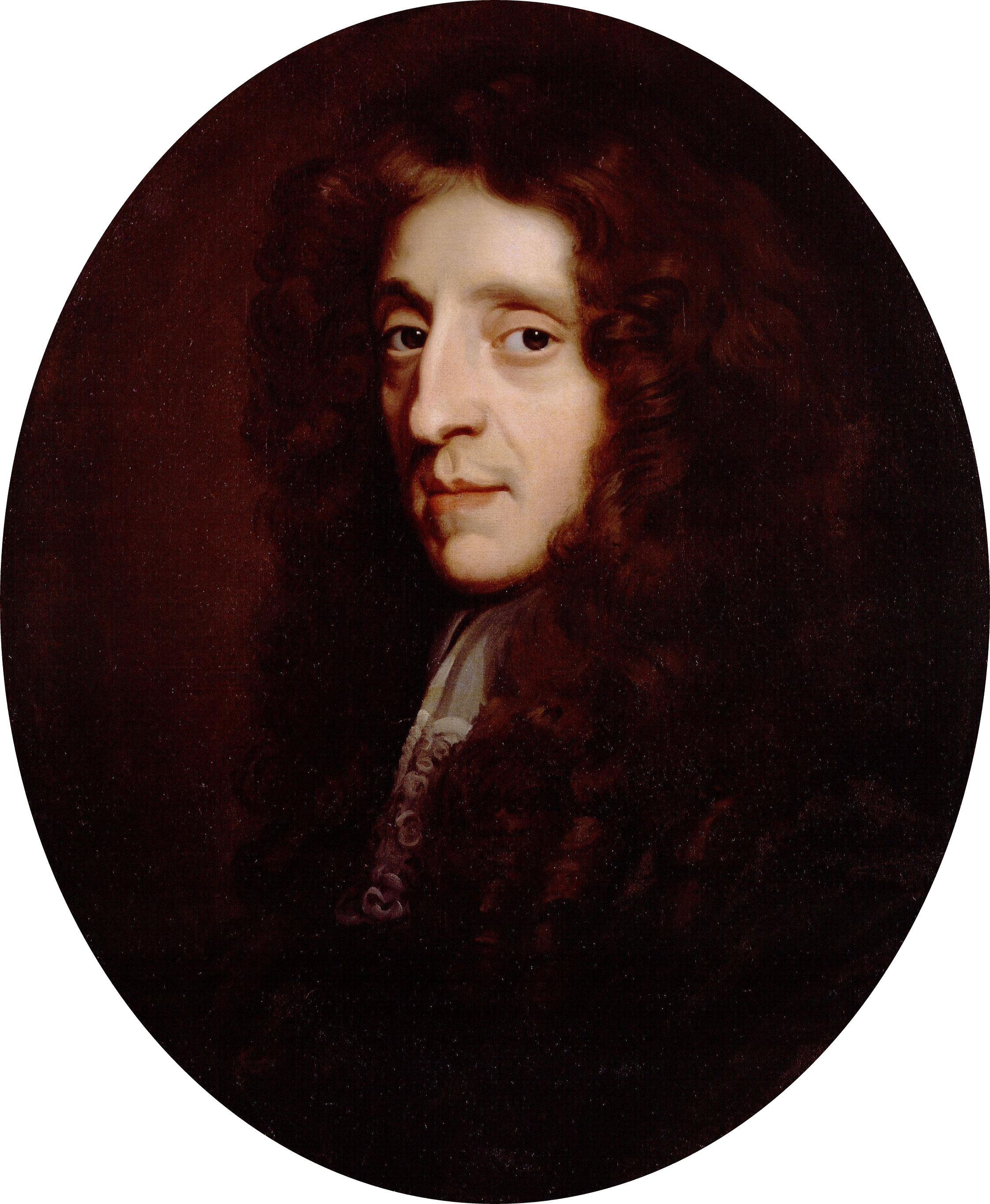
John Locke

In October 1666, Ashley met John Locke, an Oxford don living a quiet life as a scholar and physician, who would in time become his personal secretary and receive government appointments due to his patronage. Ashley had gone to Oxford, where his son was at college, but Ashley was seeking treatment for a liver ailment. Locke was a practising physician and experimentalist, as well as having a strong interest in philosophy. Ashley was impressed with Locke, and persuaded him to become part of his retinue. Locke had been looking for a career, and in May 1667 moved into Ashley's home at Exeter House in London, where he served as consulting physician during several novel surgical procedures and recoveries. Beginning in 1667, Ashley-Cooper and Locke worked closely on the Grand Model for the Province of Carolina and its centrepiece, the Fundamental Constitutions of Carolina.

When Southampton died in May 1667, Ashley, as under-treasurer, was expected to succeed Southampton as Lord High Treasurer. King Charles, however, decided to replace Southampton with a nine-man Commission of the Treasury, headed by the Duke of Albemarle as First Lord of the Treasury. Ashley was named as one of the nine Treasury Commissioners at this time.

The failures of the English during the Second Anglo-Dutch War led Charles II to lose faith in the Earl of Clarendon, who was dismissed as Lord Chancellor on 31 August 1667. The court then moved to impeach Clarendon, and was supported in this by many of Ashley's former political allies (including the Duke of Buckingham, the Earl of Bristol, and Sir Henry Bennett, who by this point had been created Henry Bennet, 1st Earl of Arlington). Ashley, however, refused to join in the fight against Clarendon, opposing a motion to have Clarendon committed to the Tower of London on a charge of treason. In 1667, Ashley was a signatory to The Several Declarations of The Company of Royal Adventurers of England Trading into Africa, a document published in 1667 which led to the creation of the Royal Africa Company.

After the fall of Lord Clarendon in 1667, Lord Ashley became a prominent member of the Cabal, in which he formed the second "A". Although the term "Cabal Ministry" is used by historians, in reality, the five members of the Cabal (Clifford, Arlington, Buckingham, Ashley, and Lauderdale) never formed a coherent ministerial team. In the period immediately after the fall of Clarendon, the government was dominated by Arlington and Buckingham. Ashley was out of royal favour and not admitted to the most powerful group of royal advisors, the Privy Council's committee on foreign affairs. Nevertheless, Ashley joined Arlington and Buckingham, as well as John Wilkins, Bishop of Chester, in introducing government-backed bills in October 1667 and February 1668 to include moderate dissenters within the Church of England. Nothing came of these bills, however. In January 1668, the Privy Council's committees were reorganised, but Ashley retained a prominent position on the committee for trade and plantations.

Members of the Cabal ministry

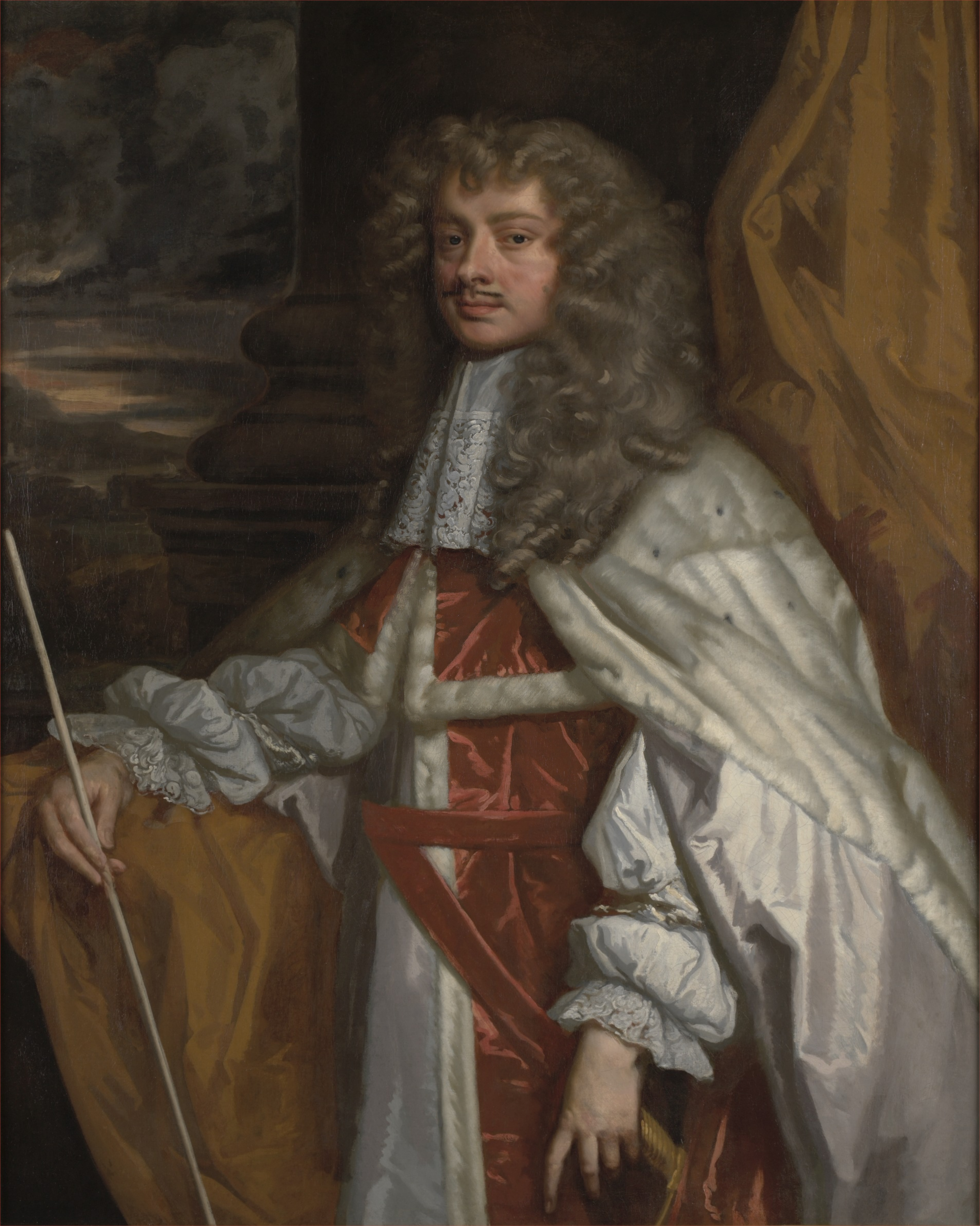
Thomas Clifford, 1st Baron Clifford of Chudleigh (1630–1673).

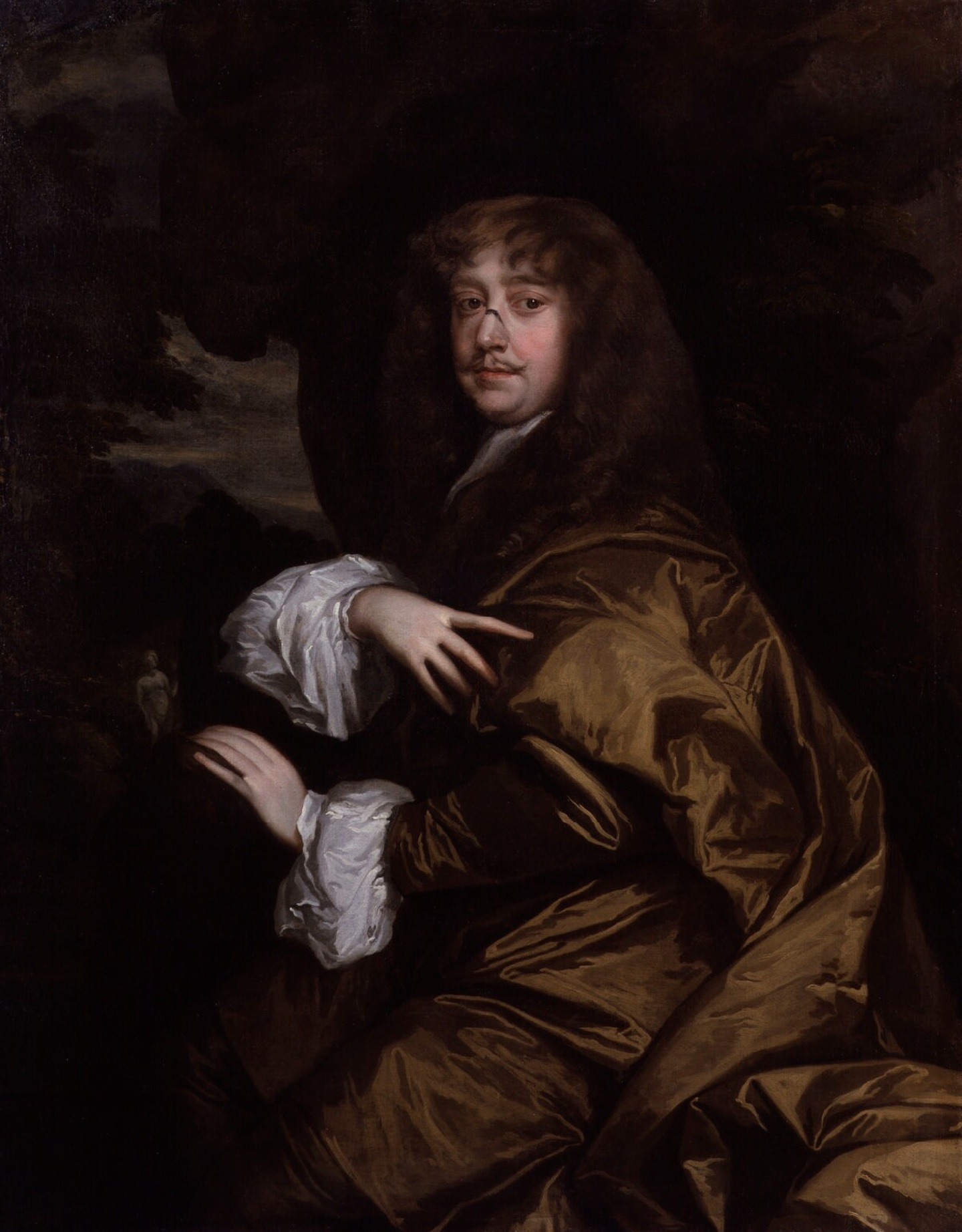
Henry Bennet, 1st Earl of Arlington (1618–1685).

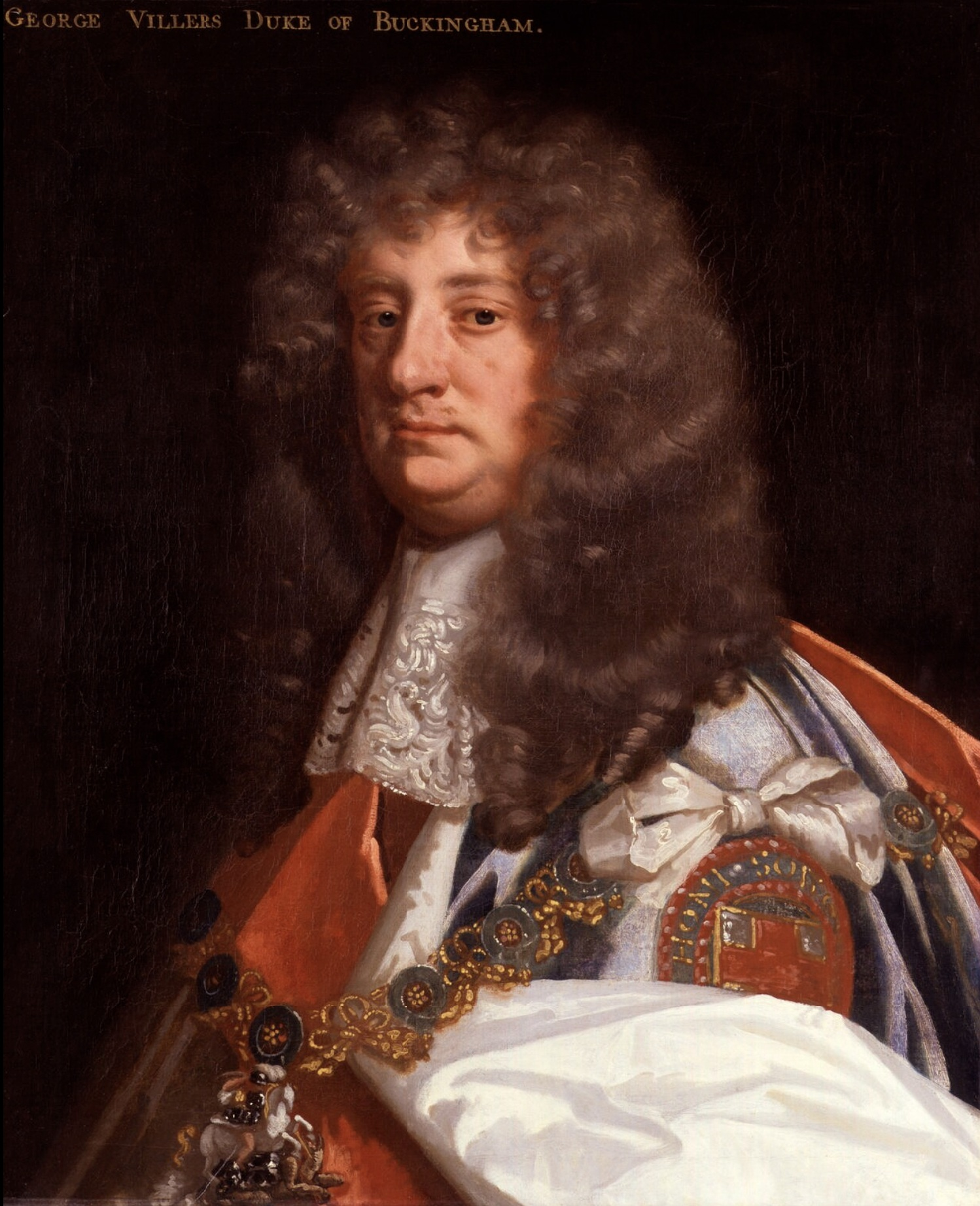
George Villiers, 2nd Duke of Buckingham (1628–1687).

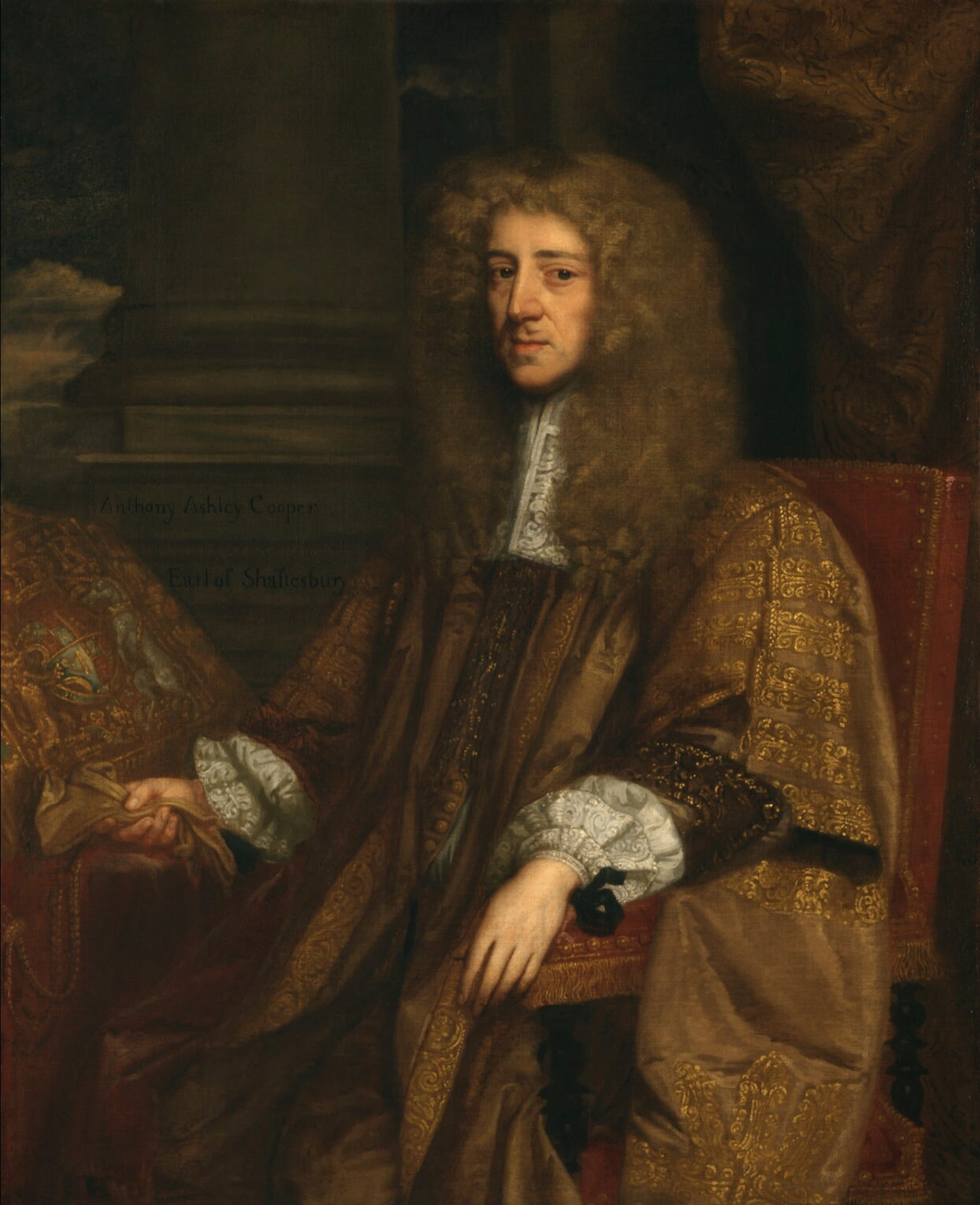
Anthony Ashley Cooper, 1st Baron Ashley of Wimborne St Giles (1621–1683).

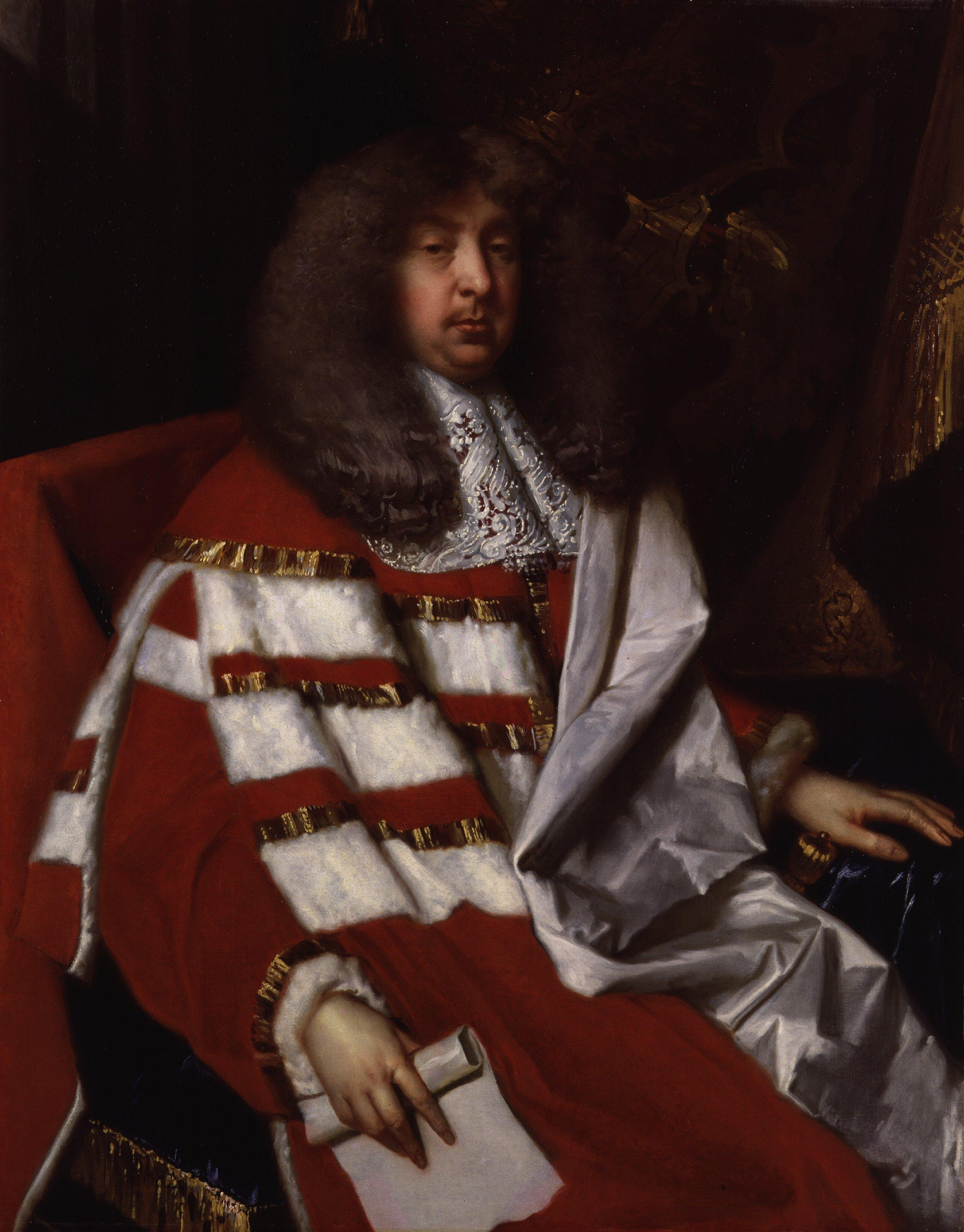
John Maitland, 1st Duke of Lauderdale (1616–1682).

In May 1668, Ashley became ill, apparently with a hydatid cyst. His secretary, John Locke, recommended an operation that almost certainly saved Ashley's life and Ashley was grateful to Locke for the rest of his life. As part of the operation, a tube was inserted to drain fluid from the abscess, and after the operation, the physician left the tube in the body, and installed a copper tap to allow for possible future drainage. In later years, this would be the occasion for his Tory enemies to dub him "Tapski", with the Polish ending because Tories accused him of wanting to make England an elective monarchy like the Polish–Lithuanian Commonwealth.

In 1669, Ashley supported Arlington and Buckingham's proposal for a political union of England with the Kingdom of Scotland. This proposal foundered when the Scottish insisted on equal representation with the English in parliament. Ashley probably did not support the Conventicles Act 1670, but neither did he sign the formal protest against the passage of the act either.

Ashley, in his role as one of the eight Lords Proprietor of the Province of Carolina, along with his secretary, John Locke, drafted the Fundamental Constitutions of Carolina, which were adopted by the eight Lords Proprietor in March 1669.

By this point, it had become obvious that the queen, Catherine of Braganza, was barren and would never produce an heir, making the king's brother, James, Duke of York heir to the throne. This worried Ashley because he suspected that James was a Catholic. Ashley and Buckingham urged Charles to declare his illegitimate son, the Duke of Monmouth, legitimate, as did Charles Howard, 1st Earl of Carlisle. When it became clear that the king would not do so, they urged him to divorce Catherine and remarry. This was the background to the famous Roos divorce case: John Manners, Lord Roos had obtained a separation from bed and board from his wife in 1663, after he discovered she was committing adultery. He had also been granted a divorce by an ecclesiastical court and had Lady Roos's children declared illegitimate. In March 1670, Lord Roos asked Parliament to allow him to remarry. The debate on the Roos divorce bill became politically charged because it had an impact on whether Parliament could legally allow Charles to remarry. During the debate, Ashley spoke out strongly in favour of the Roos divorce bill, arguing that marriage was a civil contract, not a sacrament. Parliament ultimately gave Lord Roos permission to remarry, but Charles II never attempted to divorce his wife.

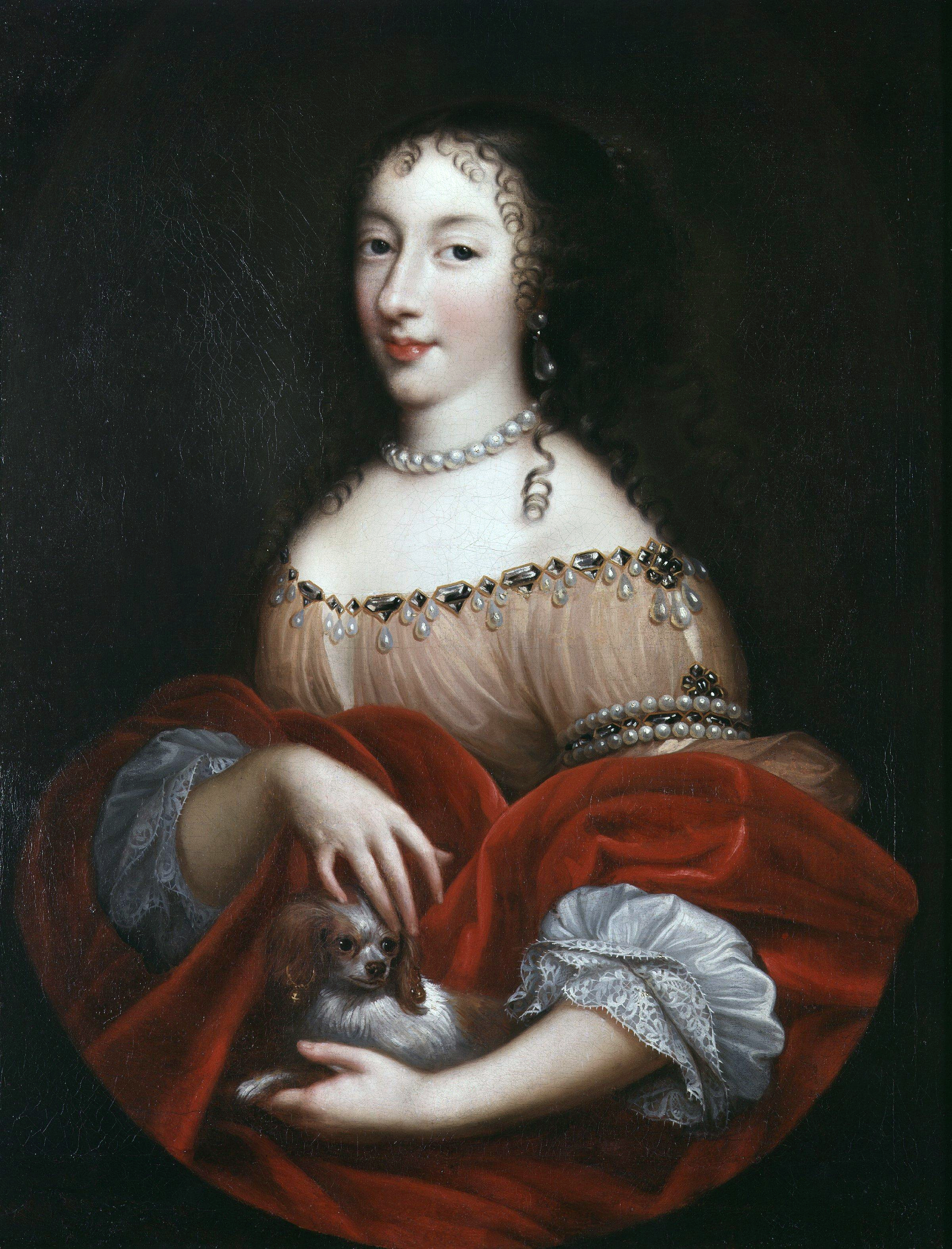
Princess Henrietta of England (1644–1670), sister of Charles II, who arranged the Secret Treaty of Dover in May 1670; Ashley was not told about the Catholic clauses contained in the Secret Treaty of Dover, and, to fool Ashley, Buckingham, and Lauderdale, a second, public Treaty of Dover was signed in December 1670

Ashley did not know about the Secret Treaty of Dover, arranged by Charles II's sister Henrietta Anne Stuart and signed on 22 May 1670, whereby Charles II concluded an alliance with Louis XIV of France against the Dutch Republic. Under the terms of the Secret Treaty of Dover, Charles would receive an annual subsidy from France (to enable him to govern without calling a parliament) in exchange for a promise that he would convert to Catholicism and re-Catholicise England at an unspecified future date. Of the members of the Cabal, only Arlington and Clifford were aware of the Catholic Clauses contained in the secret treaty. For the benefit of Ashley, Buckingham, and Lauderdale, Charles II arranged a mock treaty (traité simulé), concluding an alliance with France. Although he was suspicious of Catholic France, Ashley was also wary of Dutch commercial competition, and he, therefore, signed the mock Treaty of Dover on 21 December 1670.

Throughout 1671, Ashley argued in favour of reducing the duty on sugar imports, arguing that the duty would have an adverse effect on colonial sugar planters.

In September 1671, Ashley and Clifford oversaw a massive reform of England's customs system, whereby customs farmers were replaced with royal commissioners responsible for collecting customs. This change was ultimately to the benefit of the crown, but it caused a short-term loss of revenues that led to the Great Stop of the Exchequer. Ashley was widely blamed for the Great Stop of the Exchequer, although Clifford was the chief advocate of stopping the exchequer and Ashley in fact opposed the move.

In early 1672, with the Third Anglo–Dutch War looming, many in the government feared that Protestant dissenters in England would form a fifth column and support their Dutch co-religionists against England. In an attempt to conciliate the Nonconformists, on 15 March 1672, Charles II issued his Royal Declaration of Indulgence, suspending the penal laws that punished non-attendance at Church of England services. Ashley strongly supported this Declaration.

According to the terms of the Treaty of Dover, England declared war on the Dutch Republic on 7 April 1672, thus launching the Third Anglo-Dutch War. To accompany the outbreak of the war, Charles issued a new round of honours, as part of which Ashley was named Earl of Shaftesbury and Baron Cooper on 23 April 1672.

In autumn 1672, Ashley-Cooper played a key role in setting up the Bahamas Adventurers' Company, a partnership of eleven investors formed to establish plantations worked by enslaved labour in the Bahamas, which he and the other Carolina proprietors had been granted in 1670. The proprietors' governors struggled to impose their authority on the islands' existing settlers and the scheme made little headway.

==== Lord Chancellor, 1672–1673 ====
On 17 November 1672, the king named Ashley-Cooper Lord Chancellor of England, with Sir John Duncombe replacing Ashley-Cooper as Chancellor of the Exchequer. Ashley-Cooper was the last person without any training in the common law to be appointed to that position (until the appointment of Liz Truss in 2016). As Lord Chancellor, he addressed the opening of a new session of the Cavalier Parliament on 4 February 1673, calling on parliament to vote funds sufficient to carry out the war, arguing that the Dutch were the enemy of the monarchy and England's only major trade rival, and therefore had to be destroyed (at one point he exclaimed "Delenda est Carthago"); defending the Great Stop of the Exchequer; and arguing in support of the Royal Declaration of Indulgence.

Ashley-Cooper was not, however, well received by the House of Commons. One of Ashley-Cooper's old Dorset rivals, Colonel Giles Strangways, led an attack on writs of election that Lord Chancellor Shaftesbury had issued to fill 36 vacant seats in the House of Commons; Strangways argued that Ashley-Cooper was attempting to pack the Commons with his supporters and that only the Speaker of the House could issue writs to fill the vacant seats. The House of Commons agreed with Strangways and declared the elections void and the seats vacant. Furthermore, the Commons attacked the Declaration of Indulgence and demanded its withdrawal. Charles ultimately withdrew the address and cancelled the Declaration of Indulgence.

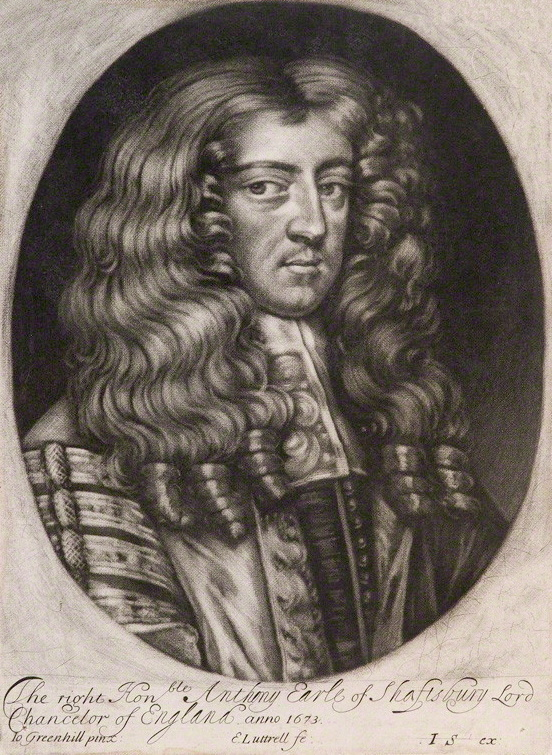
Shaftesbury in the robes of the Lord Chancellor, ca. 1672–1673

The Commons then passed an address condemning the growth of popery in England. To shore up the Protestantism of the nation, Parliament passed the Test Act 1673, which became law on 20 March 1673. The Test Act required all holders of civil and military office in England to take communion in the Church of England at least once a year and to make a declaration renouncing the Catholic doctrine of transubstantiation. Ashley-Cooper supported the Test Act, and, alongside James Scott, 1st Duke of Monmouth, received the sacrament at St Clement Danes, with John Locke serving as the legal witness for each man's conformity with the Test Act. In March 1673, Ashley-Cooper supported a bill for easing the plight of the Protestant dissenters in England, but nothing came of this bill.

Following the failure of the Declaration of Indulgence and the passage of the Test Act, it was obvious to all that the Cabal Ministry's days were numbered. Ashley-Cooper moved closer to the parliamentary opposition during this period, and became a supporter of ending the Third Anglo-Dutch War.

The Duke of York failed to take the Anglican sacrament at Easter 1673, further heightening Ashley-Cooper's concern that he was secretly a Catholic. Ashley-Cooper was initially mollified by the fact that both of the Duke of York's daughters, Mary and Anne, were committed Protestants. However, in autumn 1673, the Duke of York married the Catholic Mary of Modena by proxy, thus raising the possibility that James might have a son who would succeed to the throne ahead of Mary and Anne and thus give rise to a succession of Catholic monarchs. York urged the king to prorogue parliament before it could vote on a motion condemning his marriage to Mary of Modena, but Ashley-Cooper used procedural techniques in the House of Lords to ensure that parliament continued sitting long enough to allow the House of Commons to pass a motion condemning the match. Ashley-Cooper, Arlington, James Butler, 1st Duke of Ormonde, and Henry Coventry all urged Charles II to divorce Catherine of Braganza and remarry a Protestant princess. York began denouncing Ashley-Cooper to Charles II, and Charles II decided to remove Ashley-Cooper from his post as Lord Chancellor. On 9 November 1673, Henry Coventry travelled to Exeter House to inform Ashley-Cooper that he was relieved of his post as Lord Chancellor, but also issuing him a royal pardon for all crimes committed before 5 November 1673.

==== Opposition to Catholicism and break with Charles II, 1673–1674 ====
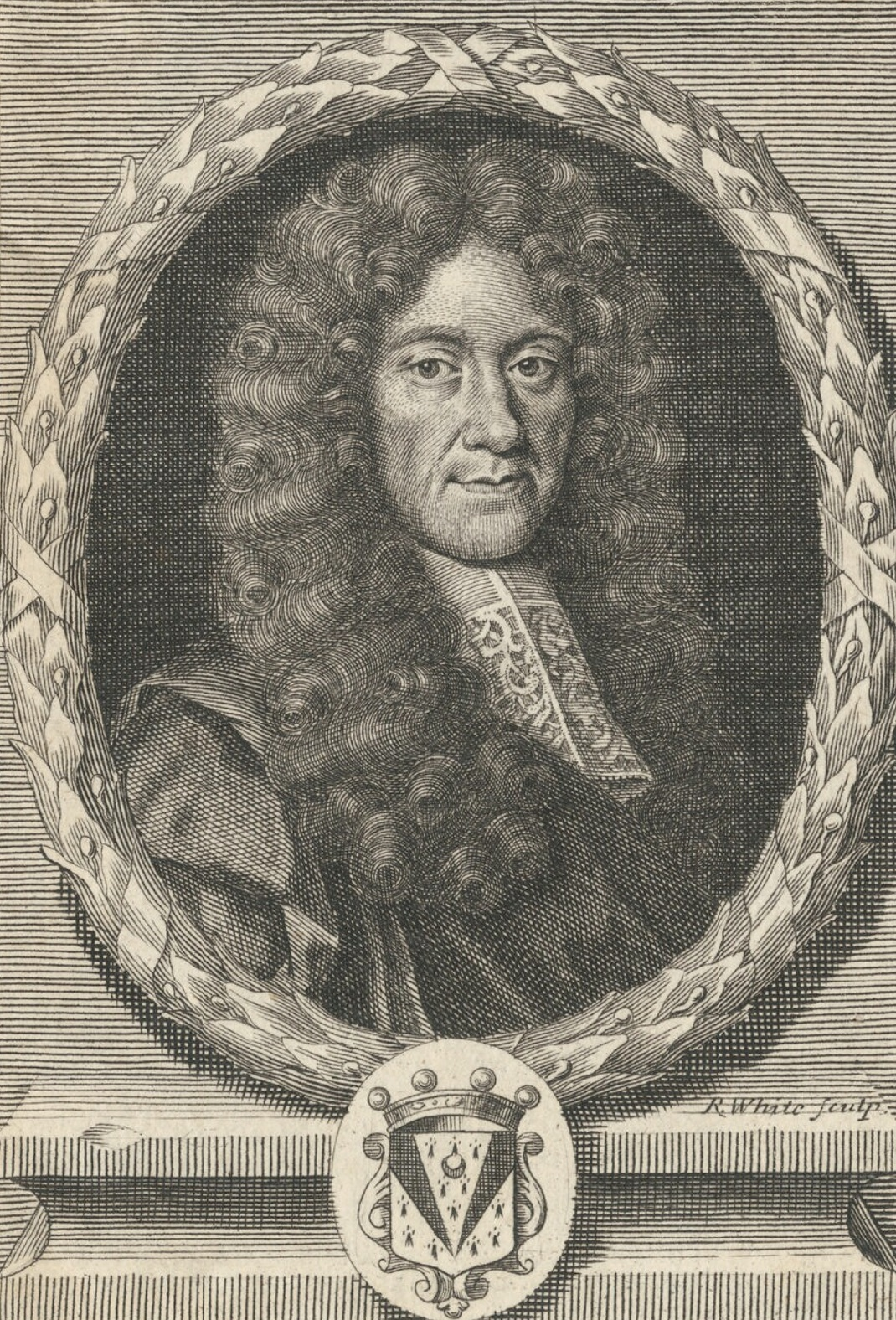
Denzil Holles, 1st Baron Holles, whose London home was used by opposition peers to plan a strategy to counter the growth of Catholic influence in England

Following Ashley-Cooper's fall from royal favour, Arlington attempted to effect a reconciliation, in November 1673 convincing the French ambassador to offer Ashley-Cooper a bribe in exchange for supporting the French party at court. Ashley-Cooper refused this offer, saying he could never support "an interest that was so apparently destructive to [England's] religion and trade". Instead, he allied himself with the Spanish party at court, and urged peace with the Netherlands. He also continued to urge the king to divorce and remarry.

In the session of the Cavalier Parliament that began on 7 January 1674, Ashley-Cooper led the charge to keep England free from popery. He coordinated his efforts with a group of other peers who were displeased with the possibility of a Catholic succession; this group met at the home of Denzil Holles, 1st Baron Holles, and included Charles Howard, 1st Earl of Carlisle, Thomas Belasyse, 2nd Viscount Fauconberg, James Cecil, 3rd Earl of Salisbury, George Villiers, 2nd Duke of Buckingham, and George Savile, 1st Viscount Halifax. On 8 January 1674, Ashley-Cooper gave a speech in the House of Lords warning that the 16,000 Catholics living in London were on the verge of rebellion, which caused the Lords to pass an address expelling all Catholics from within 10 miles of London. On 12 January, he introduced a measure that would require every peer, including the Duke of York, to take the Oath of Allegiance renouncing the pope and recognising the royal supremacy in the church (the oath was first required by the Popish Recusants Act 1605). On 24 January, the Earl of Salisbury introduced a bill requiring that any children of the Duke of York should be raised as Protestants. His proposed legislation further provided that neither the king nor any prince of the blood could marry a Catholic without parliamentary consent, on pain of being excluded from the royal succession. Ashley-Cooper spoke forcefully in favour of Salisbury's proposal; he was opposed by the bishops and Lord Finch. By February, the opposition lords were considering accusing the Duke of York of high treason, which resulted in the king proroguing parliament on 24 February to protect his brother.

Ashley-Cooper's actions in the 1674 session further angered Charles II; on 19 May 1674, Ashley-Cooper was expelled from the Privy Council, and subsequently sacked as Lord Lieutenant of Dorset and ordered to leave London.

==== Leader of Opposition to Danby, 1674–1678 ====
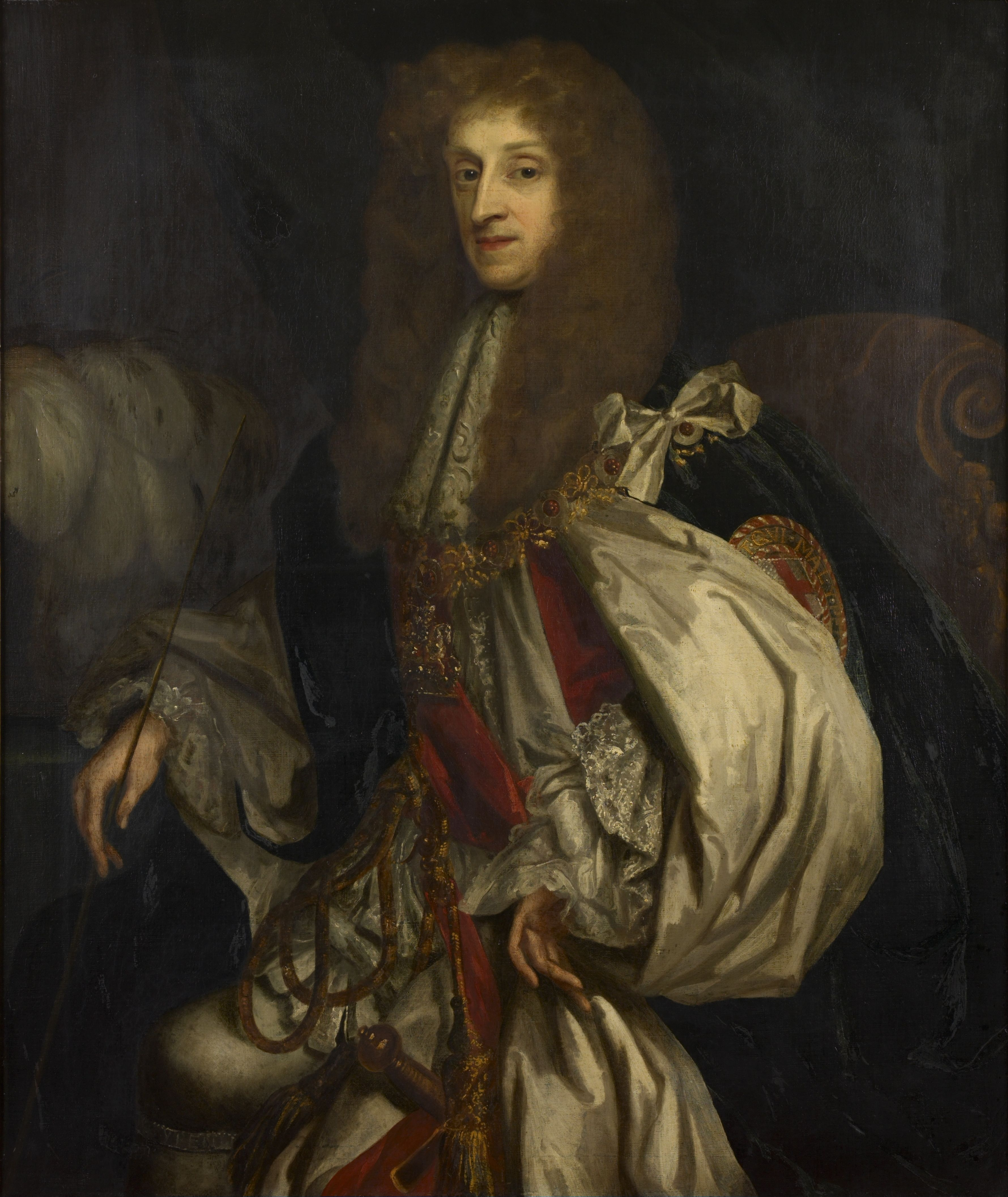
Thomas Osborne, Earl of Danby (1631–1712), who became Charles II's main adviser following the fall of the Cabal ministry, and who drew support from former Cavaliers and the supporters of the established Church of England

Charles II now turned to Thomas Osborne, Earl of Danby. Danby proceeded to freeze out peers who had collaborated during the Cromwellian regime and promoted former royalists. Danby was a champion of the Church of England who favoured strict interpretation of the penal laws against both Catholics and Protestant Nonconformists.

On 3 February 1675, Ashley-Cooper wrote a letter to Carlisle in which he argued that the king needed to dissolve the Cavalier Parliament, which had been elected in early 1661, and call fresh elections. He argued that frequent parliamentary elections were in the best interest of both the crown and the people of England. This letter circulated widely in manuscript form.

The Duke of York was opposed to Danby's strict enforcement of the penal laws against Catholics, and by April 1675, he had reached out to Ashley-Cooper to make a truce between them whereby they would be united in opposition to Danby's brand of Anglican royalism. In late April 1675, Danby introduced a Test Oath by which all holding office or seats in either House of Parliament were to declare resistance to the royal power a crime, and promise to abstain from all attempts to alter the government of either church or state. Ashley-Cooper led the parliamentary opposition to Danby's Test Bill, arguing that, under certain circumstances, it was lawful to resist the king's ministers, and that, as in the case of the Protestant Reformation, it was sometimes necessary to alter the church so as to restore it.

In spite of Ashley-Cooper's eloquence, his view remained the minority view in the parliament, forcing the king to prorogue parliament on 9 June 1675 to avoid the passage of the bill. The Duke of York, grateful for Ashley-Cooper's assistance in the debate against Danby's bill, now attempted to reconcile Ashley-Cooper with the king, and Ashley-Cooper was admitted to kiss the king's hand on 13 June 1675. This, however, angered Danby, who intervened with the king, and on 24 June, the king again ordered Ashley-Cooper to leave court.

In 1675, following the death of Sir Giles Strangways, MP for Dorset, Ashley-Cooper initially endorsed Lord Digby, son of George Digby, 2nd Earl of Bristol, for the seat but, upon learning that Digby was a strong supporter of the court, he decided to back Thomas Moore, who was the chief supporter of conventicles in the county. This led to Ashley-Cooper making an enemy of both Digby and Bristol, who accused him of supporting sedition and faction and wanting a return of the English Commonwealth.

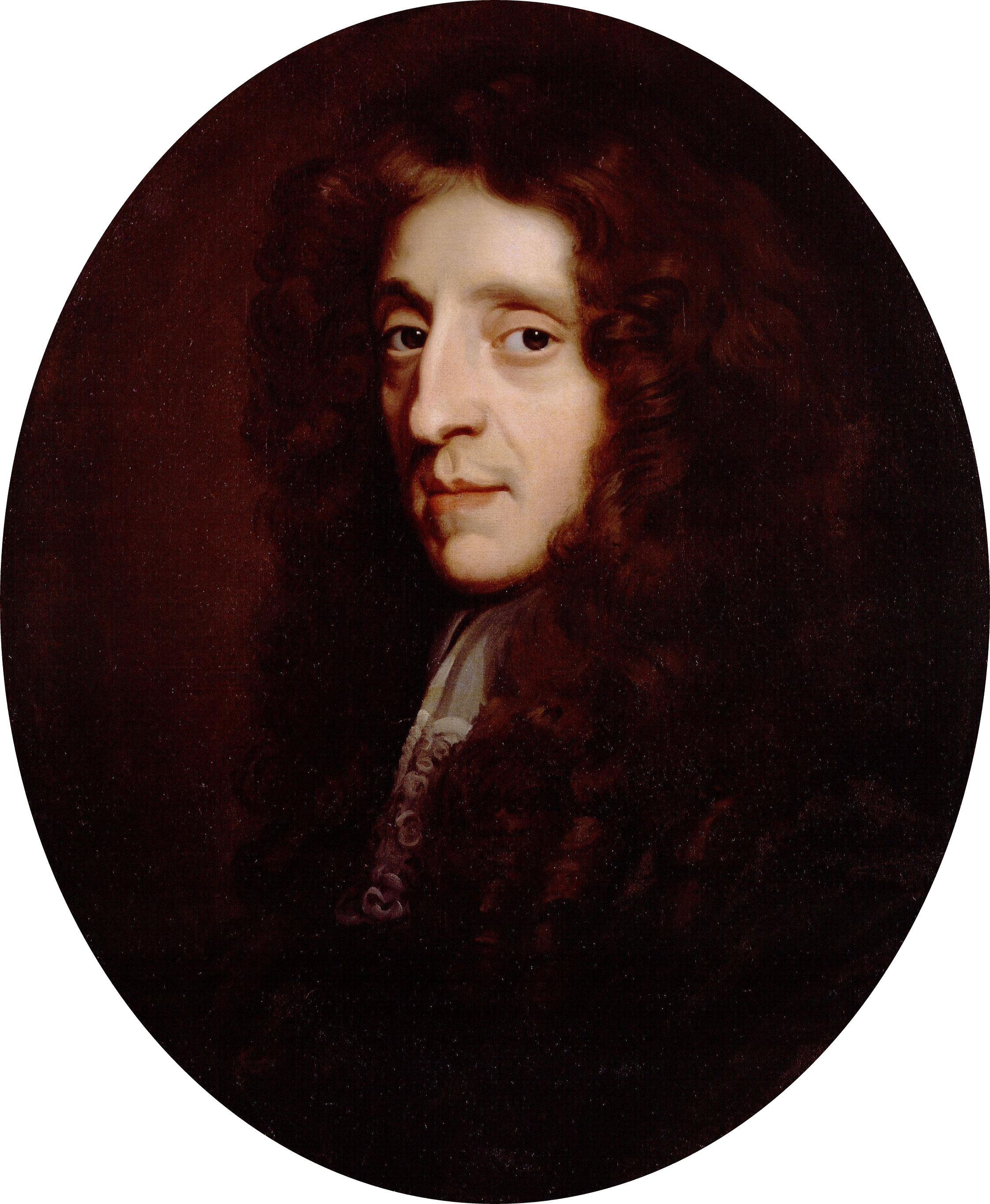
John Locke (1632–1704), who probably participated in writing A Letter from a Person of Quality to his Friend in the Country (1675)

In the summer of 1675, Ashley-Cooper wrote a 15,000-word pamphlet entitled A Letter from a Person of Quality to his Friend in the Country denouncing Danby's Test Bill. Ashley-Cooper's secretary and advisor, John Locke, played a role in drafting the Letter, and for a time it was attributed to Locke. It is unclear what Locke's role was, whether solely as amanuensis or in a more active role of collaboration, perhaps even as ghostwriter. Reaction to it was swift, with the House of Lords ordering it to be burned and set up a committee to uncover who printed it. The Letter argued that since the time of the Restoration, "the High Episcopal Man, and the Old Cavalier" (now led by Danby) had conspired to make "the Government absolute and arbitrary." According to the Letter, this (Church) party was attempting to establish divine right monarchy and divine right episcopacy, meaning that neither the king nor the bishops could be constrained by the rule of law. Religion was the overwhelming concern of the Letter, especially the attack upon Protestant freedoms occurring in England. By allying with the monarchy the old Cavaliers would achieve 'the aims of the high church through the Act of Uniformity (1662)', threatening dissenters with the Declaration of Indulgence.

Danby's Test Oath proposal was merely the latest, most nefarious attempt to introduce divine right monarchy and episcopacy on the country. The Letter went on to describe the debates of the House of Lords during the last session, setting forth the arguments that Ashley-Cooper and other lords used in opposition to Danby and the bishops. This letter was published anonymously in November 1675, and quickly became a best-seller, in no small part because it was one of the first books ever to inform the public about the debates that occurred within the House of Lords.

Ashley-Cooper repeated the accusations of the Letter from a Person of Quality on the floor of the House of Lords during the parliamentary session of October–November 1675. During the debate on the case of Shirley v. Fagg, a jurisdictional dispute about whether the House of Lords could hear appeals from lower courts when the case involved members of the House of Commons, Ashley-Cooper gave a celebrated speech on 20 October 1675. He argued that Danby and the bishops were attempting to neuter the power of the House of Lords.

Ashley-Cooper argued that every king could only rule either through the nobility or through a standing army; thus, this attempt to restrict the power of the nobility was part of a plot to rule the country through a standing army. He argued that the bishops believed that the king was king by divine right, not by law and that, if the bishops' propositions were taken to their logical conclusion, "our Magna Charta is of no force, our Laws are but Rules amongst our selves during the Kings pleasure" and "All the Properties and Liberties of the People, are to give away, not onley to the interest, but the will and pleasure of the Crown". Ashley-Cooper's concerns were rooted in his Civil War and Commonwealth experiences, in which he believed that Cromwell's reliance upon the army to assert his authority had been tyrannical. Moreover, the use of the army during that period had engendered a "mechanic tyranny" that enabled popular elements (within the army) to pull England towards democratic power: something to be feared and avoided.

On 20 November 1675, Ashley-Cooper seconded a motion by Charles Mohun, 3rd Baron Mohun of Okehampton calling on the king to end the dispute of Shirley v. Fagg by dissolving parliament. This motion, which was supported by the Duke of York and the Catholic peers, was defeated by a vote of 50–48, prompting Ashley-Cooper and 21 other peers to enter a protest on the grounds that "according to the ancient Lawes and Statutes of this Realm ... there should be frequent and new Parliaments" and that the House of Commons was being unnecessarily obstructionist. Parliament was prorogued on 22 November 1675, with the prorogation saying that parliament would not sit again until 15 February 1677. Shortly thereafter, there appeared a pamphlet entitled Two Seasonable Discourses Concerning the Present Parliament, that argued that the king should call a new parliament because a new parliament would vote the king money, preserve the Church of England, introduce religious toleration for the Nonconformists, and deliver Catholics from the penal laws in an exchange for Catholics being deprived of access to court, holding office, and the right to bear arms.

In mid-February 1676, Charles sent his Secretary of State for the Southern Department, Sir Joseph Williamson to tell Ashley-Cooper to leave town. Ashley-Cooper refused and continued to receive visits at Exeter House from opposition MPs and other discontented elements. Danby argued that Charles should order Ashley-Cooper arrested and sent to the Tower of London, but Sir Joseph Williamson refused to sign the warrant. In this period, Ashley-Cooper relocated from Exeter House to the less expensive Thanet House.

On 24 June 1676, during the election of the Sheriffs of the City of London at the Guildhall, linen draper Francis Jenks gave a sensational speech arguing that two statutes from the reign of Edward III required that parliament sit every year, and that by proroguing the Cavalier Parliament until 15 February 1677 (meaning no session would be held in 1676 at all), the king had inadvertently dissolved parliament and that the Cavalier Parliament was now legally dissolved. Although Buckingham, not Ashley-Cooper, was behind Jenks's speech, many suspected Ashley-Cooper's involvement; after Jenks' speech, Ashley-Cooper decided to take full advantage of the argument, arranging with his allies for a number of pamphlets arguing the case. One of these pamphlets, Some considerations upon the question, whether the parliament is dissolved, by its prorogation for 15 months? argued that parliament had the authority to restrict the royal prerogative and could even "bind, limit, restrain and govern the Descent and Inheritance of the Crown it self." The Duke of York was furious at the inclusion of this argument; Buckingham told York that Ashley-Cooper had drafted the controversial passage, but Ashley-Cooper claimed that the passage was inserted in the pamphlet without his knowledge.

When parliament finally met on 15 February 1677, Buckingham, backed by Ashley-Cooper, Salisbury, and Philip Wharton, 4th Baron Wharton, introduced a motion declaring that, because of the 15-month prorogation, on the basis of the statutes from the reign of Edward III, no parliament was legally in existence. Parliament not only rejected this argument, but also resolved that the four peers had committed Contempt of Parliament and should apologise. When the four refused, they were committed to the Tower of London. Ashley-Cooper petitioned for his release, and in June 1677, brought a writ of habeas corpus before the Court of King's Bench. The court, however, determined that it lacked jurisdiction because Parliament, a superior court, was currently in session. Charles ordered Buckingham, Salisbury, and Wharton released from the Tower shortly thereafter, but Ashley-Cooper continued to refuse to apologise. Ashley-Cooper had grown increasingly suspicious of Charles II. Charles had begun raising an army, ostensibly for war with France, but Ashley-Cooper worried that Charles was really preparing to abolish parliament and rule the country with a standing army on the model of Louis XIV of France. It was not until 25 February 1678 that Ashley-Cooper finally apologised to the king and to parliament for his support of the motion in the House of Lords and for bringing a writ of habeas corpus against Parliament.

With war with France looming, in March 1678, Ashley-Cooper, Buckingham, Holles, and Halifax spoke out in favour of immediately declaring war on France. Charles delayed declaring war, however, leading Ashley-Cooper to support a resolution of the House of Commons providing for immediately disbanding the army that Charles was raising. Charles prorogued parliament on 25 June, but the army was not disbanded, which worried Ashley-Cooper.

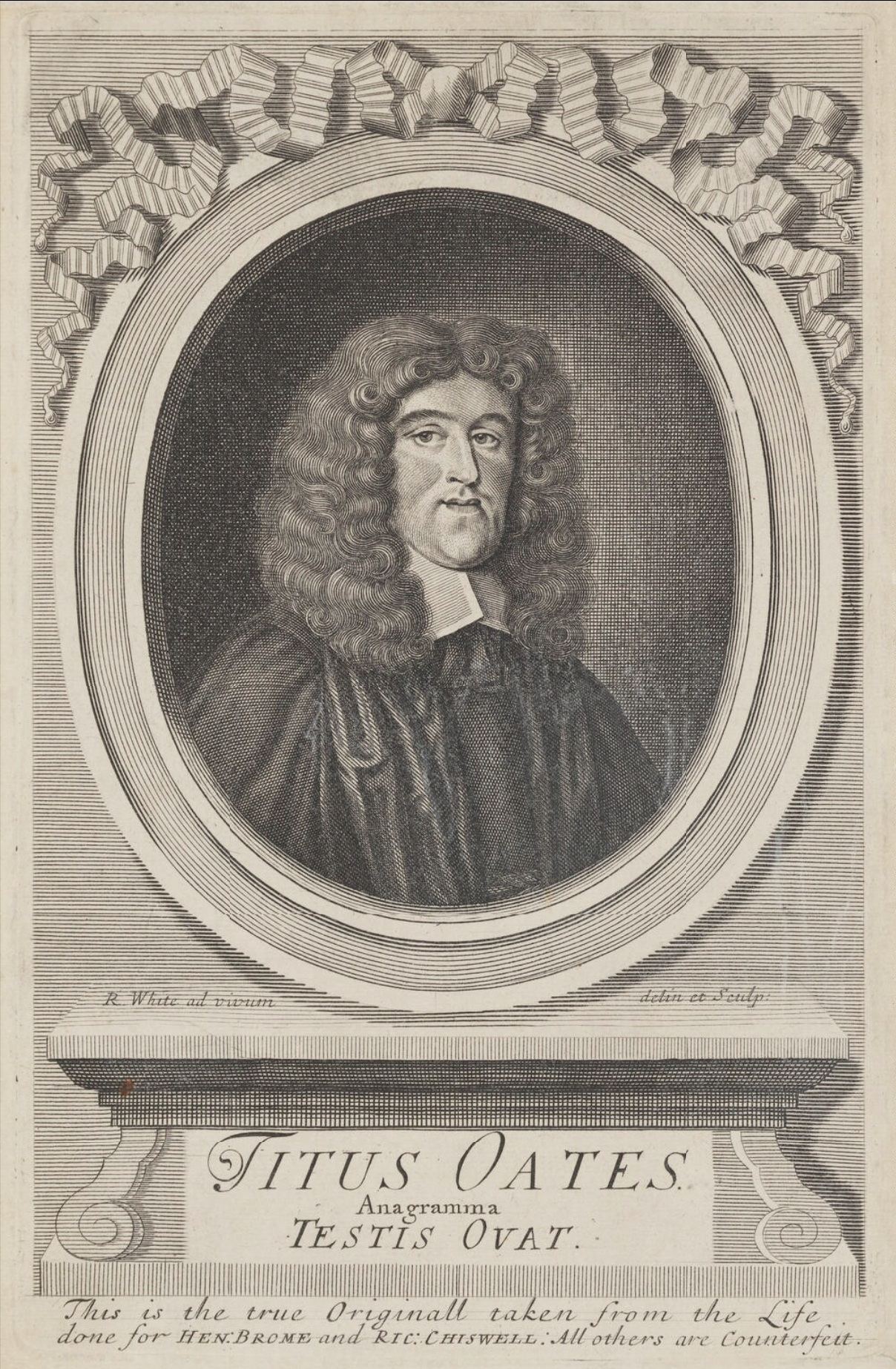
Titus Oates, whose accusations in autumn 1678 that there was a Popish Plot to murder the king and massacre English Protestants, set off a wave of anti-Catholic hysteria. Ashley-Cooper would play a prominent part in prosecuting the individuals whom Oates (falsely) accused of manufacturing this plot. The wave of anti-Catholic sentiment set off by Oates would be at the centre of Ashley-Cooper's political program during the Exclusion Crisis.

In August and September 1678, Titus Oates made accusations that there was a Popish Plot to assassinate the king, overthrow the government, and massacre English Protestants. It was later revealed that Oates had simply made up most of the details of the plot, and that there was no elaborate Popish Plot. However, when Parliament re-convened on 21 October 1678, Oates had not yet been discredited and the Popish Plot was the major topic of concern. Ashley-Cooper was a member of all the important committees of the House of Lords designed to combat the Popish Plot. On 2 November 1678, he introduced a motion demanding that the Duke of York be removed from the king's presence, although this motion was never voted on. He supported the Test Act 1678, which required that all peers and members of the House of Commons should make a declaration against transubstantiation, invocation of saints, and the sacrifice of the mass, effectively excluding all Catholics from Parliament. Oates had accused the queen, Catherine of Braganza, of involvement in the Popish Plot, leading the House of Commons to pass a resolution calling for the queen and her retinue to be removed from court; when the House of Lords rejected this resolution, Ashley-Cooper entered a formal protest. Ashley-Cooper was now gaining a great reputation amongst the common people as a Protestant hero. On 9 November 1678, Charles promised that he would sign any bill that would make them safe during the reign of his successor, so long as they did not impeach the right of his successor; this speech was widely misreported as Charles's having agreed to name the Duke of Monmouth as his successor, leading to celebratory bonfires throughout London, with crowds drinking the health of "the King, the Duke of Monmouth, and Earl of Shaftesbury, as the only three pillars of all safety". The citizens of London, fearing a Catholic plot on Ashley-Cooper's life, paid for a special guard to protect him.

In December 1678, discussion turned to impeaching the Earl of Danby, and, to protect his minister, Charles II prorogued parliament on 30 December 1678. On 24 January 1679, Charles II finally dissolved the Cavalier Parliament, which had sat for 18 years.

==== The Exclusion Crisis and the birth of the Whig Party, 1679–1683 ====
===== The Habeas Corpus Parliament, 1679 =====
In February 1679, elections were held for a new parliament, known to history as the Habeas Corpus Parliament. In preparation for this parliament, Ashley-Cooper drew up a list of members of the House of Commons in which he estimated that 32% of the members were friends of the court, 61% favoured the opposition, and 7% could go either way. He also drafted a pamphlet that was never published, entitled "The Present State of the Kingdom": in this pamphlet, Ashley-Cooper expressed concern about the power of France, the Popish Plot, and the bad influence exerted on the king by Danby, the royal mistress Louise de Kérouaille, Duchess of Portsmouth (a Catholic), and the Duke of York, who according to Ashley-Cooper was now attempting "to introduce a military and arbitrary government in his brother's time".

The new parliament met on 6 March 1679, and on 25 March, Ashley-Cooper delivered a dramatic address in the House of Lords in which he warned of the threat of popery and arbitrary government; denounced the royal administration in Scotland under John Maitland, 1st Duke of Lauderdale, and that in Ireland under James Butler, 1st Duke of Ormonde; and loudly denounced the policies of Thomas Osborne, Earl of Danby in England. Ashley-Cooper supported the House of Commons when it introduced a Bill of Attainder against Danby, and voted in favour of the bill in the House of Lords on 14 April 1679. Ashley-Cooper attempted to neutralise the influence of the episcopal bench in favour of Danby by introducing a bill moving that the bishops should not be able to sit in the House of Lords during capital trials.

===== Lord President of the Council, 1679 =====
Charles II thought that Ashley-Cooper was mainly angry because he had been out of royal favour for long, and hoped that he could rein Ashley-Cooper in by naming him Lord President of the Council on 21 April 1679, with a salary of £4,000 a year. Soon, however, Ashley-Cooper made it clear that he could not be bought off. During meetings of the now-reconstituted Privy Council, Ashley-Cooper repeatedly argued that the Duke of York must be excluded from the line of succession. He also continued to argue that Charles should remarry a Protestant princess, or legitimise James Scott, 1st Duke of Monmouth. During these meetings, Arthur Capell, 1st Earl of Essex and George Savile, 1st Earl of Halifax argued that the powers of a Catholic successor could be limited, but Ashley-Cooper argued that that would change "the whole government, and set up a democracy instead of a monarchy".

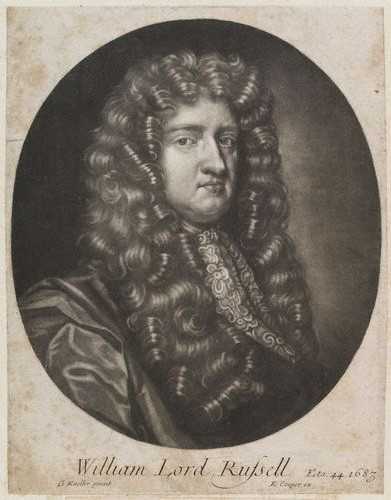
William Russell, Lord Russell (1639–1683) was one of Ashley-Cooper's closest political allies during the Exclusion Crisis; a leader in the House of Commons, he introduced the Exclusion Bill on 11 May 1679

On 11 May 1679, Ashley-Cooper's close political ally, William Russell, Lord Russell, introduced an Exclusion Bill in the House of Commons, which would have excluded the Duke of York from the succession. This bill passed first and second reading on 21 May 1679. To stop the Exclusion Bill and the Bill of Attainder directed at Danby, Charles II prorogued the parliament on 27 May 1679 and dissolved it on 3 July 1679, both of which moves infuriated Ashley-Cooper. As its name implies, the only achievement of the Habeas Corpus Parliament was the passage of the Habeas Corpus Act of 1679.

For the time being Ashley-Cooper retained his position on the Privy Council, and he and the Duke of Monmouth formed an alliance on the Council that was designed to be obstructionist. There were some disagreements between Ashley-Cooper and Monmouth: for example, Ashley-Cooper was critical of Monmouth's decision to crush a rebellion by Scottish Covenanters quickly at the Battle of Bothwell Brig in June 1679, arguing that the rebellion should have been drawn out to force Charles II to recall parliament.

On 21 August 1679, the king fell ill, leading Essex and Halifax (who feared Monmouth was about to launch a coup) to ask the Duke of York, whom Charles had sent to Brussels in late 1678, to return to England. Charles soon recovered and then ordered both York and Monmouth into exile. When Charles agreed to allow his brother to move from Flanders to Scotland in October 1679, Ashley-Cooper summoned an extraordinary meeting of the Privy Council to discuss the Duke's move, acting on his own authority as Lord President of the Council because the king was at Newmarket at the time. Angered by this insubordination, Charles removed Ashley-Cooper from the Privy Council on 14 October 1679.

===== The Exclusion Bill Parliament, 1679–1680 =====
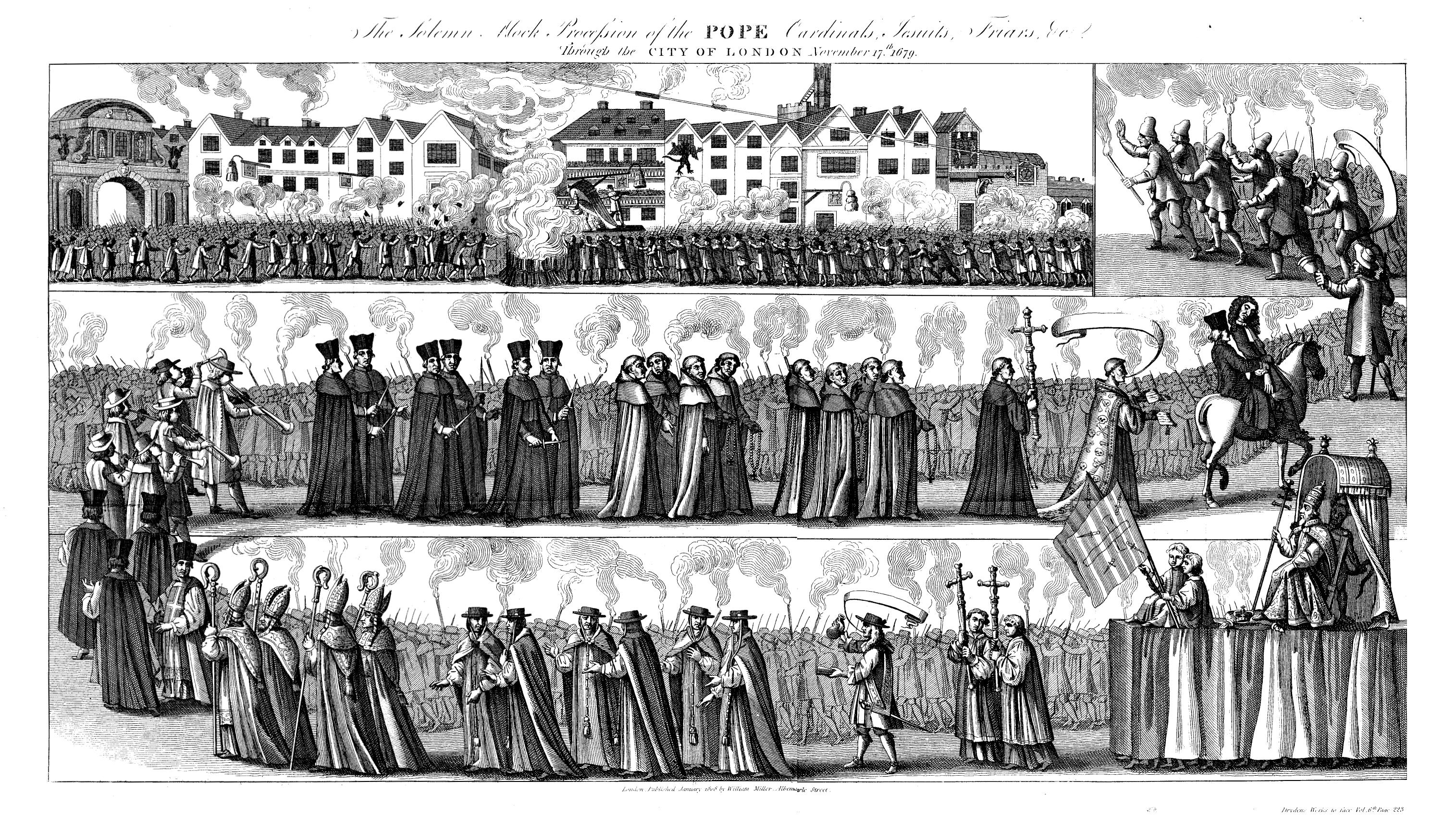
"The Solemn Mock Procession of the Pope, Cardinals, Jesuits, Friars, Etc. Through the City of London, 17 November 1679." Throughout the Exclusion Crisis, Ashley-Cooper's Whig allies in the Green Ribbon Club engaged in anti-Catholic propaganda, such as mock processions, the climax of which involved burning the pope in effigy.

Elections for a new parliament, which ultimately came to be known as the Exclusion Bill Parliament, were held in summer 1679, but they went badly for the court, so, with parliament scheduled to meet in October 1679, Charles prorogued the parliament until 26 January 1680. Ashley-Cooper worried that the king might be intending to not meet this new parliament, so he launched a massive petitioning campaign to pressure the king to meet parliament. He wrote to the Duke of Monmouth, telling him that he should return from exile, and on 27 November 1679 Monmouth rode back into London amidst scenes of widespread celebration. On 7 December 1679, a petition signed by Ashley-Cooper and fifteen other Whig peers calling on Charles to meet parliament, followed up with a 20,000-name petition on 13 January 1680. However, instead of meeting parliament, Charles further prorogued parliament and recalled his brother from Scotland. Ashley-Cooper now urged his friends on the Privy Council to resign, and four did so.

On 24 March 1680, Ashley-Cooper told the Privy Council of information he had received that the Irish Catholics were about to launch a rebellion, backed by the French. Several privy councillors, especially Henry Coventry, thought that Ashley-Cooper was making the entire story up to inflame public opinion, but an investigation was launched. This investigation ultimately resulted in the execution of Oliver Plunkett, Catholic Archbishop of Armagh, on trumped-up charges.

On 26 June 1680, Ashley-Cooper led a group of fifteen peers and commoners who presented an indictment to the Middlesex grand jury in Westminster Hall, charging the Duke of York with being a popish recusant in violation of the penal laws. Before the grand jury could act, they were dismissed for interfering in matters of state. The next week, Ashley-Cooper again tried to indict the Duke of York, but again the grand jury was dismissed before it could take any action.

The parliament finally met on 21 October 1680, and on 23 October, Ashley-Cooper called for a committee to be set up to investigate the Popish Plot. When the Exclusion Bill again came before the House of Lords, Ashley-Cooper gave an impassioned pro-Exclusion speech on 15 November. The Lords, however, rejected the Exclusion Bill by a vote of 63–30. The Lords now explored alternative ways of limiting the powers of a Catholic successor, but Ashley-Cooper argued that the only viable alternative to exclusion was calling on the king to remarry. On 23 December 1680, Ashley-Cooper gave another fiery pro-Exclusion speech in the Lords, in the course of which he attacked the Duke of York, expressed mistrust of Charles II, and urged the parliament to not approve any taxes until "the King shall satisfie the People, that what we give is not to make us Slaves and Papists". With parliament pursuing the Irish investigation vigorously, and threatening to impeach some of Charles II's judges, Charles prorogued parliament on 10 January 1681, and then dissolved it on 18 January, calling for fresh elections for a new parliament, to meet at Oxford on 21 March 1681. On 25 January 1681, Ashley-Cooper, Essex, and Salisbury presented the king with a petition signed by sixteen peers asking that parliament should be held at Westminster Hall rather than Oxford, but the king remained committed to Oxford.

===== The Oxford Parliament, 1681 =====
In February 1681, Ashley-Cooper and his supporters brought another indictment against York, this time at the Old Bailey, with the grand jury this time finding the bill true, although York's counsel was able to pursue procedural delays until the prosecution lapsed.

At the Oxford Parliament, Charles insisted he would listen to any reasonable expedient short of changing the line of succession that would assuage the nation's concerns about a Catholic successor. On 24 March 1681, Ashley-Cooper announced in the House of Lords that he had received an anonymous letter suggesting that the king's condition could be met if he were to declare the Duke of Monmouth legitimate. Charles was furious. On 26 March 1681, an Exclusion Bill was introduced in the Oxford Parliament and Charles dissolved parliament. The only issue the Oxford Parliament had resolved had been the case of Edward Fitzharris, who was to be left to the common law, although Ashley-Cooper and 19 other peers signed a formal protest of this result.

===== Prosecution for high treason, 1681–1682 =====
The end of the Oxford Parliament marked the beginning of the so-called Tory Reaction. On 2 July 1681, Ashley-Cooper was arrested on suspicion of high treason and committed to the Tower of London. He immediately petitioned the Old Bailey on a writ of habeas corpus, but the Old Bailey said it did not have jurisdiction over prisoners in the Tower of London, so Ashley-Cooper had to wait for the next session of the Court of King's Bench. Ashley-Cooper moved for a writ of habeas corpus on 24 October 1681, and his case finally came before a grand jury on 24 November 1681.

The government's case against Ashley-Cooper was particularly weak – most of the witnesses brought forth against Ashley-Cooper were witnesses whom the government admitted had already perjured themselves, and the documentary evidence was inconclusive. This, combined with the fact that the jury was handpicked by the Whig Sheriff of London, meant the government had little chance of securing a conviction and on 13 February 1682, the case against Ashley-Cooper was dropped. The announcement prompted great celebrations in London, with crowds yelling "No Popish Successor, No York, A Monmouth" and "God bless the Earl of Shaftesbury".

===== Attempts at an uprising, 1682 =====
In May 1682, Charles II fell ill, and Ashley-Cooper convened a group including Monmouth, Russell, Ford Grey, 3rd Baron Grey of Werke, and Sir Thomas Armstrong to determine what to do if the king died. They determined they would launch a rebellion demanding a parliament to settle the succession. The king recovered, however, and this was not necessary.

At the election of the Sheriffs of London in July 1682, the Tory candidates prevailed. Ashley-Cooper was worried that these Sheriffs would be able to fill juries with Tory supporters and he was desperately afraid of another prosecution for high treason. Ashley-Cooper, therefore began discussions with Monmouth, Russell, and Grey to launch coordinated rebellions in different parts of the country. Ashley-Cooper was much more eager for a rebellion than the other three, and the uprising was postponed several times, to Ashley-Cooper's chagrin.

Following the installation of the new Tory sheriffs on 28 September 1682, Ashley-Cooper grew desperate. He continued to urge an immediate uprising and also opened discussions with John Wildman about the possibility of assassinating the king and the Duke of York.

===== Flight from England and death, 1682–1683 =====
With his plots having proved unsuccessful, Ashley-Cooper determined to flee the country. He landed at Brielle sometime between 20 and 26 November 1682, reached Rotterdam on 28 November, and finally, arrived in Amsterdam on 2 December 1682.

Ashley-Cooper's health had deteriorated markedly during this voyage. In Amsterdam, he fell ill, and by the end of December, he found it difficult to keep down any food. He drew up a will on 17 January 1683. On 20 January, in a conversation with Robert Ferguson, who had accompanied him to Amsterdam, he professed himself an Arian. He died the next day, on 21 January 1683 at the residence of Abraham Kick, a Dutch merchant.

According to the provisions of his will, Ashley-Cooper's body was shipped back to Dorset on 13 February 1683, and he was buried at Wimborne St Giles on 26 February 1683. Ashley-Cooper's son, Lord Ashley, succeeded him as Earl of Shaftesbury.

== Legacy ==
John Locke drafted an epitaph for Ashley-Cooper, calling him "a vigorous and indefatigable champion for civil and ecclesiastical liberty." Although an early leader of the Whigs, "later generations disowned Shaftesbury," but they did uphold the principle he defended in Parliament's case for Exclusion, that "in the last resort the interests of the nation tak[e] precedence over those of the Crown."

In North America, the Cooper River and the Ashley River which merge in Charleston, South Carolina are named in his honour. The Ashley was given its current name by explorer Robert Sandford.

In popular culture, Ashley-Cooper has been portrayed on screen by Frederick Peisley in The First Churchills (1969), by Martin Freeman in Charles II: The Power and The Passion, and by Murray Melvin in England, My England (1995).

== Notes ==
Political offices
Preceded by Edward Hyde	Chancellor of the Exchequer; 1661–1672	Succeeded by Sir John Duncombe
Preceded by Orlando Bridgeman as Lord Keeper of the Great Seal	Lord Chancellor; 1672–1673	Succeeded by Sir Heneage Finch as Lord Keeper of the Great Seal
New title New board	First Lord of Trade; 1672–1676	Succeeded by The Earl of Bridgewater
Unknown Last known title holder: The Viscount Conway (until 1631)	Lord President of the Council; 1679	Succeeded by The Earl of Radnor
Parliament of England
Preceded by Edmund Ludlow; Second seat vacant	Member of Parliament for Wiltshire; 1653–1659; With: Nicholas Green (1653); Thomas Eyre (1653); Francis Holles (1654); John Ernle (1654); William Yorke (1654); John Norden (1654); James Ash (1654); Thomas Grove (1654–1656); Alexander Thistlethwaite (1654–1656); Alexander Popham (1654–1656); Gabriel Martin (1654–1656); Richard Howe, Bt (1656); John Bulkeley (1656); William Ludlow (1656); Henry Hungerford (1656); Sir Walter St John (1656–1659)	Succeeded by Edmund Ludlow; Second seat vacant
Not represented in Restored Rump Last: Edmund Ludlow and one vacant seat	Member of Parliament for Wiltshire; 1660–1661; With: John Ernle	Succeeded by Lord Charles Seymour; Henry Hyde
Honorary titles
Preceded by The Duke of Richmond	Lord Lieutenant of Dorset; 1672–1674	Succeeded by The Lord Poulett
Preceded by William Sydenham	Vice-Admiral of Hampshire; 1660	Succeeded by The Earl of Portland
Preceded by William Sydenham	Governor of the Isle of Wight; 1660	Succeeded by The Earl of Portland
Peerage of England
New creation	Earl of Shaftesbury; 1672–1683	Succeeded by Anthony Ashley-Cooper
New creation	Baron Ashley; 1661–1683	Succeeded by Anthony Ashley-Cooper
Baronetage of England
Preceded by John Cooper	Baronet (of Rockbourne); 1631–1683	Succeeded by Anthony Ashley-Cooper
