= John Ernle =

English politician

Sir John Ernle (1620 – June 1697) was an English politician who sat in the House of Commons at various times between 1654 and 1695. He was one of the longest-serving Chancellors of the Exchequer, a position he held from 2 May 1676 to 9 April 1689.

== Life ==
Ernle was the eldest surviving son of John Ernle of Whetham House, near Calne, Wiltshire, and his wife Philadelphia Hopton, daughter of Sir Arthur Hopton of Witham Friary, Somerset. In 1654, he was elected Member of Parliament for Wiltshire in the First Protectorate Parliament. He was elected MP for Wiltshire again in 1660 for the Convention Parliament, and in 1661 for Cricklade in the Cavalier Parliament. He was knighted by 4 April 1663. In 1671, he was commissioner for accounts of the commission for loyal and indigent officers and was Controller of Storekeepers Accounts from 1671 to 1680.

Ernle was appointed as Chancellor of the Exchequer on 2 May 1676 and was named a Privy Councillor in 1676. He held the post of Chancellor until 9 April 1689. He was named one of the Lords Commissioners of the Admiralty on 26 September 1677. He was the only member of the Plantation Committee, which dealt with the American colonies, to attend all three sessions of July 1677, although he usually attended only a quarter of those meetings.

In 1679, Ernle was elected MP for New Windsor. He was elected MP for Great Bedwyn in 1681. He succeeded to the estates of his father in 1684. In 1685 he was elected MP for Marlborough and was re-elected MP for Marlborough in 1689 and 1690. He did not stand for parliament in 1695 and retired to his country estates.

Ernle died in 1697 and was buried at Calne on 27 June 1697. He made several charitable bequests to the poor of Calne, Highworth and Bury Blunsdon. A free school for five boys founded by Ernle continued in his home county, Wiltshire, until 1829.

== Family ==
Ernle married firstly under a settlement made on 1 March 1646, Susan Howe, daughter of Sir John Howe, 1st Baronet of Little Compton, Withington, Gloucestershire; they had two sons and seven daughters. He married secondly on 19 September 1672, Elizabeth Seymour widow of Charles Seymour, 2nd Baron Seymour of Trowbridge and daughter of William Alington, 1st Baron Alington of Killard. He was the father of Sir John Ernle, a notable naval officer of the Third Anglo-Dutch War.

His daughter Philadelphia Ernle (d.1692) married Sir John Potenger (d.1733). They are buried together in Blunsdon in Wiltshire, with a monument by Peter Scheemakers.

== Antecedents ==
Ernle was descended from John Ernle the Elder, Esquire, of Fosbury and Bishop's Cannings, Wiltshire (born 1461/2), the ancestor of the Wiltshire branch of the family, and from John Ernle, Esq., of Sidlesham, Sussex (died 1465), whose wife Margaret was a daughter of Nicholas Morley, Esq., of Glynde Place, Sussex. He was thus a kinsman of the Sir John Ernley who served as Solicitor General, Attorney General, and Lord Chief Justice of the Court of Common Pleas early in the 16th century.

Political offices
Preceded by Sir John Duncombe	Chancellor of the Exchequer of England; 1676–1689	Succeeded by Henry Booth, 1st Earl of Warrington
Parliament of England
Preceded by Sir Anthony Ashley Cooper; Nicholas Green; Thomas Eyre	Member of Parliament for Wiltshire; 1654; With: Sir Anthony Ashley Cooper; Thomas Grove; Alexander Thistlethwaite; Alexander Popham; Francis Holles; John Norden; William Yorke; James Ash; Gabriel Martin	Succeeded by Sir Anthony Ashley Cooper; Thomas Grove; Alexander Thistlethwaite; Sir Alexander Popham; Richard Howe; Sir Walter St John; John Bulkeley; William Ludlow; Henry Hungerford; Gabriel Martin
Preceded by Edmund Ludlow	Member of Parliament for Wiltshire; 1660–1661; Served alongside: Sir Anthony Ashley Cooper	Succeeded by Charles Seymour; Henry Hyde
Preceded by Hungerford Dunch; Nevil Maskelyne	Member of Parliament for Cricklade; 1661–1679; Served alongside: John Powney	Succeeded by Hungerford Dunch; Edmund Webb
Preceded by Sir Francis Winnington; Thomas Higgons	Member of Parliament for New Windsor; 1679; Served alongside: Sir George Hungerford	Succeeded by Richard Winwood; Samuel Starkey
Preceded by Francis Stonehouse; William Finch	Member of Parliament for Great Bedwyn; 1681–1685; Served alongside: John Wildman	Succeeded by Lemuel Kingdon; Thomas Loder
Preceded by Thomas Bennet; Lord Bruce	Member of Parliament for Marlborough; 1685–1695; Served alongside: Sir George Willoughby 1685–1695; Thomas Bennet 1695	Succeeded by Thomas Bennet; William Daniell
