= John Norden (MP) =

John Norden (c. 1612 – 20 June 1669) was an English lawyer and politician who sat in the House of Commons at various times between 1654 and 1669.

Norden was the second son of William Norden of Rowde and his wife Mary Lybbe, daughter of Richard Lybbe of Hardwick, Whitchurch, Oxfordshire. He was educated at Hart Hall, Oxford and was awarded BA in 1631. He entered Middle Temple in 1630 and was called to the bar in 1638. in 1641, he succeeded to the family estates on the death of his brother. He was J.P. for Wiltshire from 1646 to 1653. In 1654, he was elected Member of Parliament for Wiltshire in the First Protectorate Parliament. In 1657, he was JP for Wiltshire again and commissioner for assessment. He was commissioner for assessment from January 1660 to his death and commissioner for militia in March 1660. He was JP for Wiltshire again from March 1660 until his death.

In April 1660, Norden was elected MP in double returns for both Old Sarum and Devizes in the Convention Parliament and chose to sit for Old Sarum. He was proposed as a Knight of the Royal Oak with an income of £800. In 1662, he became an alderman of Devizes and remained until his death. In December 1666 he was elected MP for Devizes in a by-election to the Cavalier Parliament. He was solicitor for aids for Wiltshire from 1667.

Norden married at the age of 30 by licence dated 29 May 1647 to Elizabeth Skinner, daughter of Edmund Skinner of Cradley, Herefordshire and had six children.

Parliament of England
Preceded by Sir Anthony Ashley Cooper; Nicholas Green; Thomas Eyre	Member of Parliament for Wiltshire; 1654; With: Sir Anthony Ashley Cooper; Thomas Grove; Alexander Thistlethwaite; Alexander Popham; Francis Holles; John Ernle; William Yorke; James Ash; Gabriel Martin	Succeeded by Sir Anthony Ashley Cooper; Thomas Grove; Alexander Thistlethwaite; Sir Alexander Popham; Richard Howe; Sir Walter St John; John Bulkeley; William Ludlow; Henry Hungerford; Gabriel Martin
