= William Yorke (died 1666) =

William Yorke (c. 1609 – 1 November 1666) was an English lawyer and politician who sat in the House of Commons for two periods between 1654 and 1666.

Yorke was the son of William Yorke of Bassett Down, Lydiard Tregoze, Wiltshire, and his wife Anne Stampe, daughter of Simon Stampe of Oxfordshire. His origins were modest, although his father styled himself "gentleman", and was rich enough to give William an expensive education. He matriculated at Pembroke College, Oxford on 25 May 1627, aged 17 and was awarded BA in 1630. He entered the Inner Temple in 1630 and was called to the bar in 1637. He had the reputation of being a fine lawyer, and was also something of an antiquarian. He was commissioner for excise for Wiltshire in 1644 and was justice of the peace for Wiltshire for the first time between 1646 and 1651. He became a bencher of his Inn in 1652 and was JP again from 1652 to 1657. He also became deputy governor for the Society of Mineral and Battery Works in 1652 and remained in that post until his death

In 1654, Yorke was elected member of parliament for Wiltshire in the First Protectorate Parliament. He was assistant of the Society of Mines Royal from 1654 to 1655 and deputy governor of the society from 1655 until his death. In 1657 he was commissioner for assessment for Wiltshire and became JP again, remaining until his death. He was commissioner for assessment for Wiltshire again from January 1660 until his death. He inherited the estates of his father in 1660. He became a freeman of Devizes in 1660 and became Recorder in 1661. In 1661 he was elected MP for Devizes in the Cavalier Parliament. He was an extremely active member, sitting on 170 committees. He conformed to the Church of England, but was noted for his Puritan leanings. He was an alderman of Devizes from 1662 until his death.

Yorke died at the age of 56 and was buried in the Temple Church on 26 November 1666.

Yorke married Elizabeth Danvers, widow of Henry Danvers of Baynton, Edington, and daughter of William Bower of West Lavington, Wiltshire, before 27 October 1646. Their only son died in infancy

Parliament of England
Preceded by Sir Anthony Ashley Cooper; Nicholas Green; Thomas Eyre	Member of Parliament for Wiltshire; 1654; With: Sir Anthony Ashley Cooper; Thomas Grove; Alexander Thistlethwaite; Alexander Popham; Francis Holles; John Ernle; John Norden; James Ash; Gabriel Martin	Succeeded by Sir Anthony Ashley Cooper; Thomas Grove; Alexander Thistlethwaite; Alexander Popham; Richard Howe; Sir Walter St John; John Bulkeley; William Ludlow; Henry Hungerford; Gabriel Martin
