= Sir Richard Howe, 2nd Baronet =

English politician

Sir Richard Grobham Howe, 2nd Baronet (28 August 1621 – 3 May 1703), was an English politician who sat in the House of Commons at various times between 1656 and 1695.

== Life ==
Howe was the eldest son of Sir John Howe, 1st Baronet, of Little Compton, Withington, Gloucestershire, and his wife Bridget Rich, daughter of Thomas Rich of North Cerney, Master in Chancery. He was educated at Hart Hall, Oxford, in 1640 and at Lincoln's Inn in 1641. From 1650 to 1652 and from 1656 to 1680, he was J.P. for Wiltshire.

In 1656, Howe was elected Member of Parliament for Wiltshire in the Second Protectorate Parliament. He was commissioner for assessment for Wiltshire in 1657. In 1659 he was elected MP for Wilton in the Third Protectorate Parliament. He was commissioner for assessment for Wiltshire from January 1660 to 1680, commissioner for militia for Wiltshire in March 1660 and captain of militia horse for Wiltshire in April 1660. In June 1660 he was returned as MP for Wilton in the Convention Parliament.

He became Gentleman of the Privy Chamber (extraordinary) in July 1660. He was knighted in around 1665 and was High Sheriff of Wiltshire from 1668 to 1669. In 1670 he became Deputy Lieutenant until June 1688. He succeeded his father in the baronetcy in 1671. In 1672 he was made freeman of Salisbury. He was commissioner for assessment for Gloucestershire from 1673 to 1680. In May 1675 he was elected MP for Wiltshire in the Cavalier Parliament. He was re-elected MP for Wiltshire in March 1679 and was elected MP for Hindon in October 1679. He was elected MP for Hindon in 1681. In 1685 he was made freeman of Wilton and in 1686 he was a commissioner for rebels’ estates in Wiltshire. He became Deputy Lieutenant again in October 1688 and JP for Wiltshire again in 1689. In 1689 and 1690 he was commissioner for assessment for Gloucestershire and Wiltshire. In 1690 he was re-elected MP for Wilton.

Howe died at the age of 81.

== Family ==
Howe married firstly before 1642 Lucy St John, daughter of Sir John St John, 1st Baronet, of Lydiard Tregoze, Wiltshire, and had five sons and four daughters. Lucy died in 1658 and he married secondly Anne Dutton /née King), widow of John Dutton of Sherborne, Gloucestershire, and daughter of John King, Bishop of London. He was succeeded in the baronetcy by his son Richard. His brother John was MP for Gloucestershire.

Parliament of England
Preceded by Sir Anthony Ashley Cooper; Thomas Grove; Alexander Thistlethwaite; Alexander Popham; Francis Holles; John Ernle; William Yorke; John Norden; James Ash; Gabriel Martin	Member of Parliament for Wiltshire; 1656; With: Sir Anthony Ashley Cooper; Thomas Grove; Alexander Thistlethwaite; Sir Alexander Popham; Sir Walter St John; John Bulkeley; William Ludlow; Henry Hungerford; Gabriel Martin	Succeeded by Sir Anthony Ashley Cooper; Sir Walter St John
Preceded by Not represented in Second Protectorate Parliament	Member of Parliament for Wilton; 1659; With: Hon. John Herbert	Succeeded by Not represented in Restored Rump
Baronetage of England
Preceded by John Howe	Baronet of Compton; 1671–1703	Succeeded by Richard Howe
