= Francis Holles, 2nd Baron Holles =

English noble

Francis Holles, 2nd Baron Holles (1627–1690) was an English noble, and only child of Denzil Holles, 1st Baron Holles (best known as one of the five members of parliament whom King Charles I of England attempted to arrest in 1642) and his first wife Dorothy, daughter and heiress of Sir Francis Ashley. Francis inherited the peerage of Baron Holles from his father.

Francis represented both the Wiltshire and Lostwithiel British parliamentary constituencies. Whilst sitting for the latter, he was excluded from the Pride's Purge, which took place in December 1648. He was also returned for Dorchester in both elections of 1679, in March and October (parliament dissolved 1681).

His son Denzil Holles, 3rd Baron Holles (1675–c. 1692), inherited his title.

A sculpture of Francis by Nicholas Stone exists in Westminster Abbey.

Parliament of England
Preceded by Sir Anthony Ashley Cooper; Nicholas Green; Thomas Eyre	Member of Parliament for Wiltshire; 1654; With: Sir Anthony Ashley Cooper; Thomas Grove; Alexander Thistlethwaite; Alexander Popham; John Norden; John Ernle; William Yorke; James Ash; Gabriel Martin	Succeeded by Sir Anthony Ashley Cooper; Thomas Grove; Alexander Thistlethwaite; Sir Alexander Popham; Richard Howe; Sir Walter St John; John Bulkeley; William Ludlow; Henry Hungerford; Gabriel Martin
Peerage of England
Preceded by Denzil Holles	Baron Holles; 1680–1690	Succeeded by Denzil Holles
Baronetage of England
New creation	Baronet (of Winterbourne); 1660–1690	Succeeded by Denzil Holles
