= William Yorke =

William Yorke may refer to:

- William Yorke (died 1666), Member of Parliament for Devizes and Wiltshire
- William Yorke (died 1702), Member of Parliament for Boston
- Sir William Yorke, 1st Baronet (died 1776), Irish judge
