= Thomas Grove (politician, died 1692) =

English politician

Member of Parliament for Milborne Port
- In office 1645–1648

Member of Parliament for Wiltshire
- In office 1654–1655

Member of Parliament for Wiltshire
- In office 1656–1658

Member of Parliament for Marlborough
- In office 1659–1659

Member of Parliament for Shaftesbury
- In office 1660–1660

Personal details
- Born: c. 1609
- Died: January 27, 1692 (aged 82–83) England
- Education: Middle Temple (1627)
- Occupation: Politician

Thomas Grove (c. 1609 – 27 January 1692) was an English politician who sat in the House of Commons at various times between 1645 and 1660.

Grove was the son of Robert Grove of Mere, Wiltshire and his wife Honor South, daughter of Thomas South of Swallowcliffe, also in Wiltshire. He was a student of Middle Temple in 1627. He was of Ferne House, Donhead St Mary, Wiltshire.

In 1645, he was elected Member of Parliament for Milborne Port in Somerset as a recruiter to the Long Parliament. In December 1648 he was one of the Members excluded in Pride's Purge. He was MP for Wiltshire in the First Protectorate Parliament in 1654 and in the Second Protectorate Parliament in 1656. In 1659 he was elected MP for Marlborough in the Third Protectorate Parliament. He was elected for MP for Shaftesbury, Dorset in the Convention Parliament of 1660.
