= Thomas Grove =

Thomas Grove may refer to:

- Thomas Grove (politician, died 1692) (c. 1609–1692), English MP for Milborne Port (1645–1648), Wiltshire (1654–1658), Marlborough (1659), Shaftesbury (1660–1661)
- Thomas Grove (MP for Wallingford), 14th-century MP for Wallingford (UK Parliament constituency)
- Thomas Newcomen Archibald Grove (1855–1920), British MP for West Ham North (1892–1895) and for South Northamptonshire (1900–1906)
- Sir Thomas Grove, 1st Baronet (1823–1897), British MP for South Wiltshire (1865–1874) and for Wilton (1885–1892)
