= James Nash (MP) =

English politician

James Nash or Ash (died 1400), of Hereford, was an English politician.

== Family ==
He was the illegitimate son of Richard Nash, MP.

== Career ==
He was a member (MP) of the parliament of England for Hereford in January 1390, November 1390, January 1397 and 1399.
