= Nicholas Green (Wiltshire MP) =

English politician

Member of Parliament for Wiltshire
- In office 5 July 1653 – 12 December 1653

Nicholas Green was an English politician who served as a Member of Parliament (MP) for Wiltshire in Barebone's Parliament.

== See also ==
- List of members nominated to the English parliament in 1653
