= Thomas Eyre (MP) =

English politician

Thomas Eyre (died 1628), was an English politician.

He was a member (MP) of the parliament of England for Salisbury in 1597.
