= Henry Hungerford =

English politician (1611–1673)

Henry Hungerford (23 July 1611 – 27 May 1673) was an English politician who sat in the House of Commons variously between 1645 and 1660,

Hungerford was the son of Sir Anthony Hungerford of Stoke House, near Great Bedwyn in Wiltshire. He matriculated at Queen's College, Oxford on 4 November 1631 aged 19, and was awarded BA on 6 June 1633. He was called to the bar at Lincoln's Inn in 1642.

In 1646, Hungerford was elected Member of Parliament for Great Bedwyn in the Long Parliament and sat until 1648 when he was excluded under Pride's Purge. He was elected MP for Wiltshire in 1656 for the Second Protectorate Parliament, and MP for Great Bedwyn again in 1659 for the Third Protectorate Parliament.

In 1660, Hungerford was elected MP for Marlborough in the Convention Parliament.

Hungerford died at the age of 61.
