= Sir John St John, 1st Baronet =

English Baronet (1585-1648)

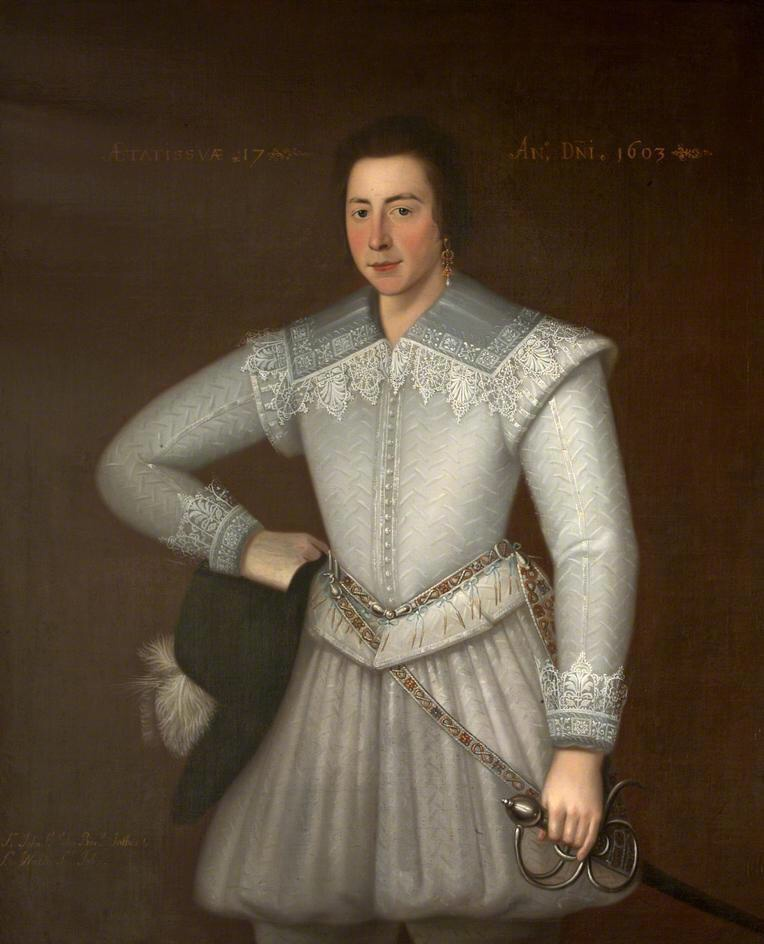
- John St John at age 17

Personal details
- Spouse: Anne Leighton
- Relations: Oliver St John, 1st Viscount Grandison (uncle)
- Children: 7, including Walter and Henry
- Parents: Sir John St John (father); Lucy Hungerford (mother)

Arms of St John: Argent, on a chief gules two mullets or

Sir John St John, 1st Baronet (5 November 1585 – 1648) of Lydiard Tregoze in the English county of Wiltshire, was a Member of Parliament and prominent Royalist during the English Civil War. He was created a baronet on 22 May 1611.

== Biography ==
St John was the second son of Sir John St John (d. 1594) of Lydiard Tregoze and his wife Lucy, the daughter of Sir Walter Hungerford. Upon his father's death in 1594, most of the family estates, in Wiltshire, went to his elder brother Walter; John received the manor of Garsington, Oxfordshire, and was promised £200 when he came of age. He was first placed in the guardianship of a distant relative, John St John, 2nd Baron St John of Bletso, but Lord St John died in 1596, and guardianship then passed to John's uncle, Sir Oliver St John. Sir Oliver arranged for John's education: he matriculated at Trinity College, Oxford, on 3 April 1601 and was admitted to Lincoln's Inn in 1604. Meanwhile, John's brother Walter drowned near Castle Cornet in August 1597 while staying with Sir Thomas Leighton, Governor of Guernsey. From him, John inherited Lydiard Tregoze and the rest of the family estates in Wiltshire. His mother died in 1598, leaving him her jointure estates of Purley Park, Berkshire, and Hatfield Peverel, Essex. Sir Thomas Leighton purchased his wardship in 1602, and received permission to settle various estates on his daughter Anne, who married St John on 9 July 1604 at the age of 12.

He was knighted at Whitehall, on 2 February 1608, and was created a baronet at the first institution of that order, on 22 May 1611, being the seventeenth in precedency by creation. In the early 1630s he inherited from Lord Grandison, his uncle, his estates at Battersea and Wandsworth.

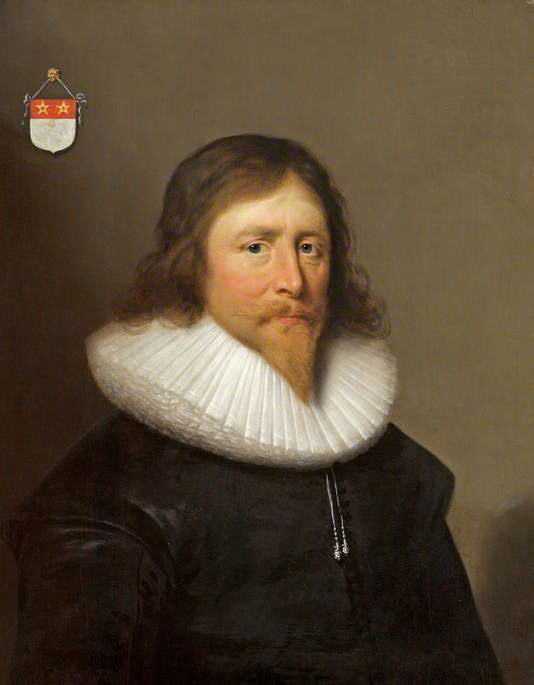
John St John in 1631

St John was Member of Parliament for Wiltshire from 1624 to 1625 and High Sheriff of Wiltshire from 1632 to 1633.

During the English Civil War, St John and his family supported the Royalist cause. Three of his sons were slain in the service of King Charles I: William, his second son, was killed at the taking of Cirencester, in Gloucestershire, under Prince Rupert; Edward, the third son, at the Battle of Newbury, in Berkshire; and John, the fifth son, in the north.

St John erected a memorial in 1634 to himself and his two wives in St Mary's Church, Lydiard Tregoze. This included sculptures by Samuel Baldwin with alabaster effigies and his surviving children kneeling and those who hadn't survived recumbent below.

== Family ==
He was the third child and eldest son of Sir John St John (1560–1594) and of Lucy Hungerford (1560–1627), daughter of Sir Walter Hungerford (Knight of Farley) and a granddaughter of the attainted and executed Walter Hungerford, 1st Baron Hungerford of Heytesbury.

He married twice:

1. In 1604 he married Anne (died 1628), a daughter of Sir Thomas Leighton of Feckenham in Worcestershire, Governor of Jersey and Guernsey, and Elizabeth Knollys. Anne died in childbirth.
2. In 1630 Margaret (died 1637), daughter of William Whitmore (died 1593), Haberdasher of London and the childless widow of Sir Richard Grobham (d.1629), of Great Wishford, Wiltshire. Under her first husband's will Margaret held a number of manors in Wiltshire and Gloucestershire for life.

Through the marriages he arranged for his sisters, St John was the brother-in-law of Sir Allen Apsley, Giles Mompesson and Sir Edward Villiers. His uncle, Oliver St John, was created the first Viscount Grandison in 1620.

=== Children ===
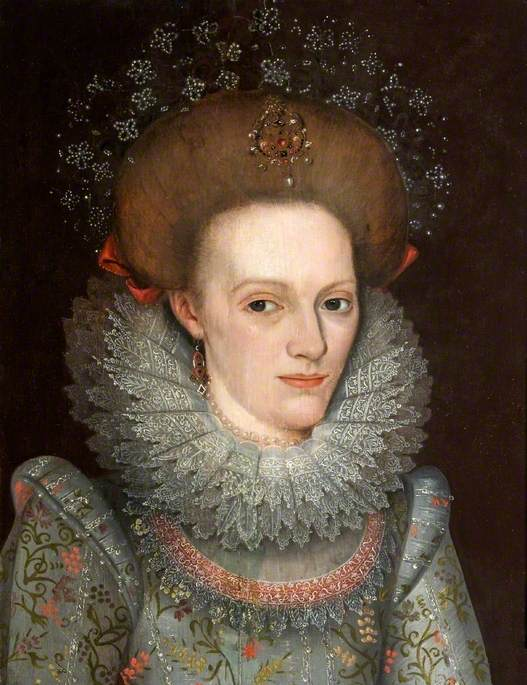
Anne Leighton, St John's first wife, died giving birth to Henry in July 1628 after having borne twelve other children.

By his first wife he had nine sons and four daughters, six of whom died in childhood:

1. Oliver St John (1612/1613 – November 1641 or 1642) married Catherine Vere, daughter of Horace Vere, 1st Baron Vere of Tilbury, and Mary Tracy, and had Sir John St John, 2nd Baronet, in 1638 (died 1657)
2. Anne St John, Countess of Rochester (5 November 1614 – 18 March 1696), married first Sir Francis Henry Lee, 2nd Baronet, of Ditchley, and second Henry Wilmot, 1st Earl of Rochester
3. John St John (b. 24 March 1615) married Dorothy Ayloffe.
4. Edward St John (26 February 1617 – died at the Second Battle of Newbury, 1645)
5. Nicholas St John (29 March 1620 – 18 April 1639)
6. Sir Walter St John, 3rd Baronet of Lydiard Tregoze and of Battersea (1622 – 3 July 1708) married in 1651 his second cousin Johanna St John, daughter of Oliver St John of Longthorpe
7. Henry St John of Tandragee, County Armagh (July 1628 – 9 September 1679) married his second cousin Catherine St John, daughter of Oliver St John, of Longthorpe. Assassinated upon his estate of Drumlyn Hill, near Knockbridge, on the orders of local Rapparee leader Count Redmond O'Hanlon.

== See also ==
- St John baronets
- Viscount Bolingbroke

== Notes ==
Baronetage of England
New creation	Baronet (of Lydiard Tregoze); 1611–1648	Succeeded by John St John
