= Ballymore Parish Church =

Church in County Armagh, Northern Ireland

Coordinates: 54.3555°N 6.4154°W

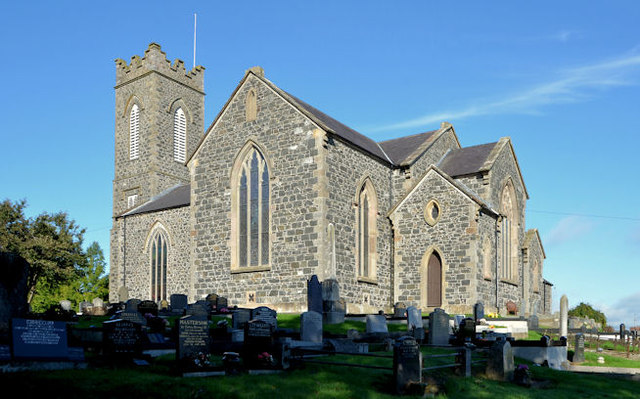
Ballymore Parish Church (2013)

Ballymore Parish Church is a 19th-century stone Church of Ireland church in Tandragee, County Armagh, Northern Ireland.

The church was referenced in ecclesiastical records as far back as 1343 and maintained an association with the Dukes of Manchester, who were benefactors to the church, until the mid-1950s. The previous church was demolished in 1812 to allow for the building of a bigger cruciform church.

== History ==
In 1343, Roger Sampford held possession of a Prebendary of Armagh for the Parish Church of Tamlackikieth (Tandragee) with its churches.

In 1610, King James I granted Oliver St. John, Lord Deputy of Ireland a large plot of land, which included Ballymore. In 1622, Oliver St. John constructed the church of Ballymore on this land. This structure functioned not only as a place of worship but also as a fortress, featuring walls that were four feet thick and a cannon on the church tower. During the Irish Rebellion of 1641, violence broke out in Tandragee which lead to Edmond O'Hanlon and his rebels setting fire to the church. The church was repaired in 1670, during which a tower was also constructed.

In February 1812, it was recorded that the church located on the site was demolished to make way for a larger structure, as the previous building had become inadequate for the congregation's needs. During the construction, remnants of the old walls were uncovered, revealing a thickness of over four feet and constructed from brick. Additionally, the loopholes and embrasures showed signs of the fire that occurred in the 1641 Irish Rebellion. Construction of the new church began on 2 March 1812.

In 1846, the transepts and chancel were constructed, followed by interior renovations in 1884, during which a new organ, donated by William Montagu, 7th Duke of Manchester, was installed adjacent to the chancel. In 1889, the peal of tubular bells was installed in the tower. The structure features a cruciform design and initially included traditional boxed seating along with a gallery at the western end. Additionally, there were two prominent enclosed pews located in each transept: the Rectory pew on the north side and the Duke's pew on the south. A fireplace was positioned next to the Duke's pew, a luxury that was not extended to the Rectory family.

Several renovation enhancements to the church were carried out in the early 20th century, which included the donation of some of the stained glass windows from the Dukes of Manchester as well as contributions from parishioners in memory of their loved ones. Throughout the 1900s, a number of external renovations and structural repairs were undertaken, such as the removal of pebble dash from the exterior walls in 1926, followed by repointing of the stones.

The wooden panelling in the sanctuary, on the organ loft, and on the wall adjacent to the font at the rear was acquired from Tandragee Castle in 1955. The identification of dry rot in 1962 led to significant repairs, including the complete replacement of the roof, during which the gallery was also dismantled. By the end of the 20th century, the external walls underwent repointing, and the damaged sandstone mullions surrounding several stained glass windows were replaced.

== St. John vault ==
The St. John vault was built by Oliver St. John's great-nephew, Henry St. John, and the first to be buried here was his daughter.

On September 9, 1679, St. John was horse riding on his estate of Drumlyn Hill, near Knockbridge, accompanied by a manservant and Reverend Power, the Vicar of Tandragee. Suddenly, a group of followers of Redmond O'Hanlon, known as Tories, appeared and abducted him. Reverend Power was warned that Henry St. John would be killed if any rescue attempt was made. Shortly thereafter, a group of Protestant tenants from the St. John family arrived and opened fire on the abductors. As a result, Henry St. John was struck in the forehead by a bullet. Reverend Power later stated that the lethal shot was fired at point-blank by the Tory who was leading away St. John's horse.

Local oral tradition holds that when the St. John vault was opened for Henry St. John's burial, the body of his daughter was discovered outside her coffin at the entrance of the vault. It is believed that she had been buried alive and perished while attempting to escape her tomb.

In 1812, the St. John vault was reopened, revealing a box that contained a paper sealed within a bottle. The note stated, "This box contains the bones of Henry St. John Esq., Lord of this manor of Ballymore and of his daughter. He rebuilt the church of Tandragee and built this vault."

The Reverend J. B. Leslie noted in 1911 that the St. John vault was located in front of the pulpit. However, since no evidence of its existence remains, it is likely that it was covered during the replacement of the sandstone flags in the church in 1926.
