= Redmond O'Hanlon (outlaw) =

Irish guerrilla and outlaw

Count Redmond O'Hanlon (Irish: Réamonn Ó hAnluain), (c. 1640 – 25 April 1681) was a 17th century Irish tóraidhe or rapparee; an outlawed member of the Gaelic nobility of Ireland who still held to the code of conduct of the traditional chiefs of the Irish clans.

Historian John J. Marshall has called Redmond O'Hanlon Ireland's answer to Robin Hood and Rob Roy MacGregor. Stephen Dunford has further dubbed O'Hanlon "The Irish Skanderbeg".

== Family background ==
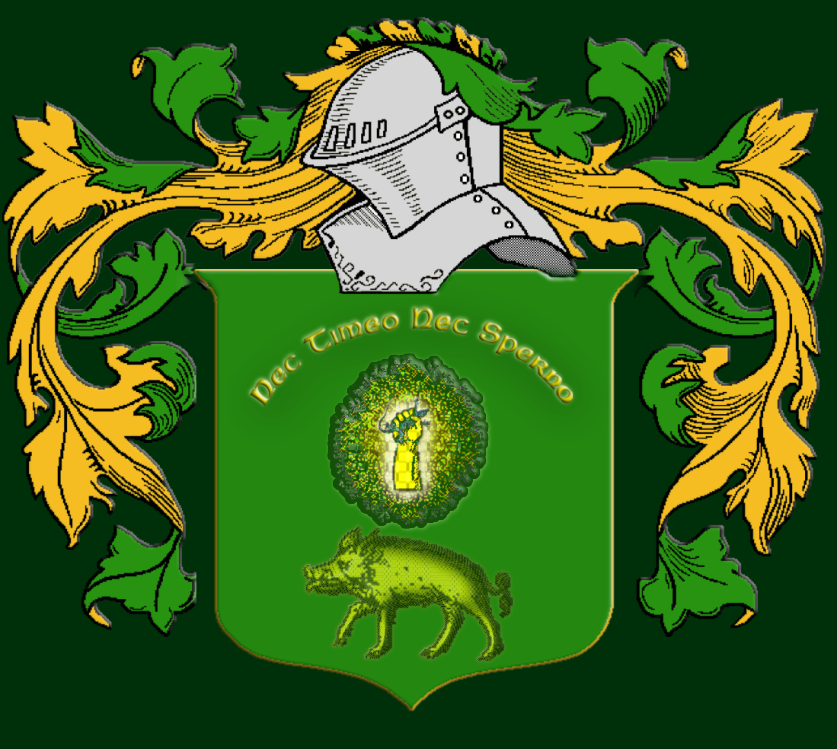
Coat of arms of Count Redmond O'Hanlon

Although born in impoverished circumstances, Redmond was part of the Derbfine of the last O'Hanlon Chief of the Name, Lord of Airgíalla, and Master of Tandragee Castle.

During the Nine Years' War, Sir Oghie O'Hanlon had allied the Clan with Queen Elizabeth I against Hugh O'Neill and Red Hugh O'Donnell. In 1606, Sir Oghie received his Clan's lands under the policy of Surrender and regrant. According to Royal decree, the family's manor was to be passed on to Sir Oghie's heirs under Primogeniture, rather than the Brehon Law policy of Tanistry.

Sir Oghie's grant was revoked, however, when his son and many other relations joined Sir Cahir O'Doherty's Rebellion in 1608. As a result, the O'Hanlon family was reduced to ruling a small portion of the clan's former homeland. The rest became the property of Sir Oliver St. John, the Lord Deputy of Ireland, who evicted the O'Hanlons from the best land on his estate, which was planted with Scottish and English Protestants. During the Irish Rebellion of 1641, the O'Hanlon clan rose and attempted to retake their traditional lands in vain.

Sir Oghie's heirs lost what little land they still possessed following the Cromwellian conquest of Ireland. In accordance with the Act for the Settlement of Ireland 1652, the O'Hanlon family's remaining lands were confiscated and they were deported to Connaught.

== Early life ==
According to John J. Marshall, "Of the childhood and upbringing of the famous outlaw we have no reliable account, but a very rare pamphlet on the life and death of Redmond O'Hanlon, dated 1st August 1681 and published in Dublin, 1682, states that 'Redmond, son of Loghlin O'Hanlon, was born near Poyntzpass in the County of Armagh in the year 1640,' but some of the later lives say he was born at the foot of Slieve Gullion, and local tradition confirms this."

As was still customary among the Gaelic nobility of Ireland, O'Hanlon was given in fosterage within the Clan to Cathal O'Hanlon, whose son "Art McCall O'Hanlon" was later one of the outlaw Count's closest associates. In addition to teaching his foster son how to live off the land and to withstand cold and other hardships, Cathal O'Hanlon would also have taught Redmond O'Hanlon the traditional code of conduct still demanded of both Irish and Scottish clan chiefs.

In his biography of Rob Roy MacGregor, W.H. Murray described the code of conduct as follows, "The abiding principle is cast up from the records of detail: that right must be seen to be done, no man left destitute, the given word honoured, the strictest honour observed to all who have given implicit trust, and that a guest's confidence in his safety must never be betrayed by his host, or vice versa. There was more of like kind, and each held as its kernel the simple ideal of trust honoured... Breaches of it were abhorred and damned... The ideal was applied 'with discretion'. Its interpretation went deeply into domestic life, but stayed shallow for war and politics."

According to John J. Marshall, the 17th-century pamphlet continues, "'It was his good fortune to be educated in an English school where he attained to such perfection in that language that it might have proved a great advantage to him in the afterlife.' His linguistic accomplishments certainly did prove useful to him in the afterlife. He is represented as a most accomplished gentleman, equal to Ossory, who was accounted for manners and bearing the finest cavalier since Sir Philip Sidney. He was also an excellent actor and mimic, able to personate a King's officer, merchant or countryman, as the exigencies of the case required. In one of the contemporary pamphlets, there is given what is most evidently a fictitious account of his youth and early days in which he is represented as a being a footman for Sir George Acheson of Markethill, and while in the gentleman's employment practising himself in all the accounts of roguery. Cosgrave's account seems quite probable when he says – 'Redmond once happened to be at the killing of a gentleman in a quarrel, and flying for safety, stayed abroad for a long time, still refusing to come to a trial, till he was outlawed, which put him into his shifts.' It is likely that O'Hanlon fled to France and there joined the Army where he acquired which he so often turned to good use in his after-career, and also was able to speak French like a native, Gaelic and English being equally at his command."

It is not known when he returned to Ireland, but Stephen Dunford suggests it was around 1660, as part of the Restoration of King Charles II to the Irish throne. Like all the other Irish landowners who had been dispossessed for supporting King Charles I during the Cromwellian invasion of Ireland, Redmond O'Hanlon soon realized that there would be no reversal of the Cromwellian land confiscations by the new King. In response, Redmond took to the hills around Slieve Gullion and became an outlaw, or rapparee.

According to Stephen Dunford, "He is likely to have seen himself as one of the chieftains of the clan and therefore honour-bound to exact justice."

== Outlaw ==
Although Redmond O'Hanlon has often been compared to a real-life Robin Hood, he has much more in common with Rob Roy MacGregor.

Like many Irish and Scottish clan chiefs of the same era, O'Hanlon operated an extralegal Watch over the Anglo-Irish landlords and Ulster Scots merchants of Armagh, Tyrone, and Down. In return for an annual fee, O'Hanlon retrieved cattle and horses stolen from landlords under his Watch and paid in full for what could not be restored. Peddlers and merchants who placed themselves under the Count's Watch were provided with a written pass, which was to be shown to highwaymen wishing to rob them.

Making a living by cattle raiding and selling protection against theft was considered an honourable way for the Gaelic nobility in both Ireland and Scotland to continue fulfilling their traditional obligations to provide for their families and clansmen. The protection money O'Hanlon received, which Protestant landlords and settlers in Ireland referred to as "black rent", was used to pay O'Hanlon's many spies and, to a far greater degree, to feed his clansmen and their families. According to Stephen Dunford, even well into the 19th century in Ireland, "to the ordinary people, the taking of black rent was perfectly justified".

Anyone who robbed travellers who carried the Count's passes or rustled livestock from herds under his Watch were tracked down, forced to return the stolen money or merchandise, and then fined by the Count for the first two offences. Anyone who did so a third time was killed. O'Hanlon is also described as scrupulously adhering to his word once it is given.

According to a 1681 pamphlet, "[He was] rather nimble than strong; more subtle than valiant; naturally bold but not cruel, shedding no man's blood out of wantonness or delight, but in his own defence, or by the chance of a shot; he was rapacious, but not covetous; he gathered much money to save himself, and to enrich others; like a bird of prey, he was greedy to devour, but all went through him as fast as he swallowed."

In 1674 the authorities in Dublin Castle put a price on Redmond O'Hanlon and several other known raparees. In 1676, the price was increased, with posters advertising for his capture, dead or alive.

A 1681 pamphlet describes his character:

"Necessity first prompted him to evil courses and success hardened him in them; he did not rob to maintain his own prodigality, but to gratify his spies and pensioners: Temperance, Liberality, and Reservedness were the three qualities that preserved him; none but they of the House where he was knew till the next morning where he lay all night; he allowed his followers to stuff themselves with meat and good liquor, but confined himself to milk and water; he thought it better thrift to disperse his money among his Receivers and Intelligencers, than to carry it in a purse, or hide it in a hole; he prolonged his life by a general distrust."

== Tory hunters ==
According to Stephen Dunford, "Tory hunting was then a popular pastime and many adventurers eagerly joined in the chase... It was a lucrative business and in June 1676 alone seven known outlaws had been killed. Two of the most notorious Tory-hunting families in the country were the Cootes of Cootehill and the Johnstons of the Fews, planters infamous for their cruelty and ruthlessness in tracking down and murdering priests."

Dunford continues, "Tradition has it that on one occasion the Johnstons tracked Redmond as far as the shore of Carlingford Lough. With the pursuers at his heels, the outlaw was left with no option but to swim the estuary. He was spotted entering the water by the hunters, they unleashed a ferocious hound and the massive animal plunged into the water in pursuit. The dog caught up with Redmond and a fierce struggle ensued, man against beast, with the outlaw proving victorious: he drowned the dog and escaped."

Also according to Dunford, "He was nothing if not resourceful. Legend has it that when the need arose Redmond was known to reverse his horse's shoes to confuse his pursuers. There are accounts of him and his gang using reversible jackets ... When turned inside out they became the red coats of the army, and were used on many occasions to outwit the authorities and unsuspecting travellers."

== The informer-priest ==
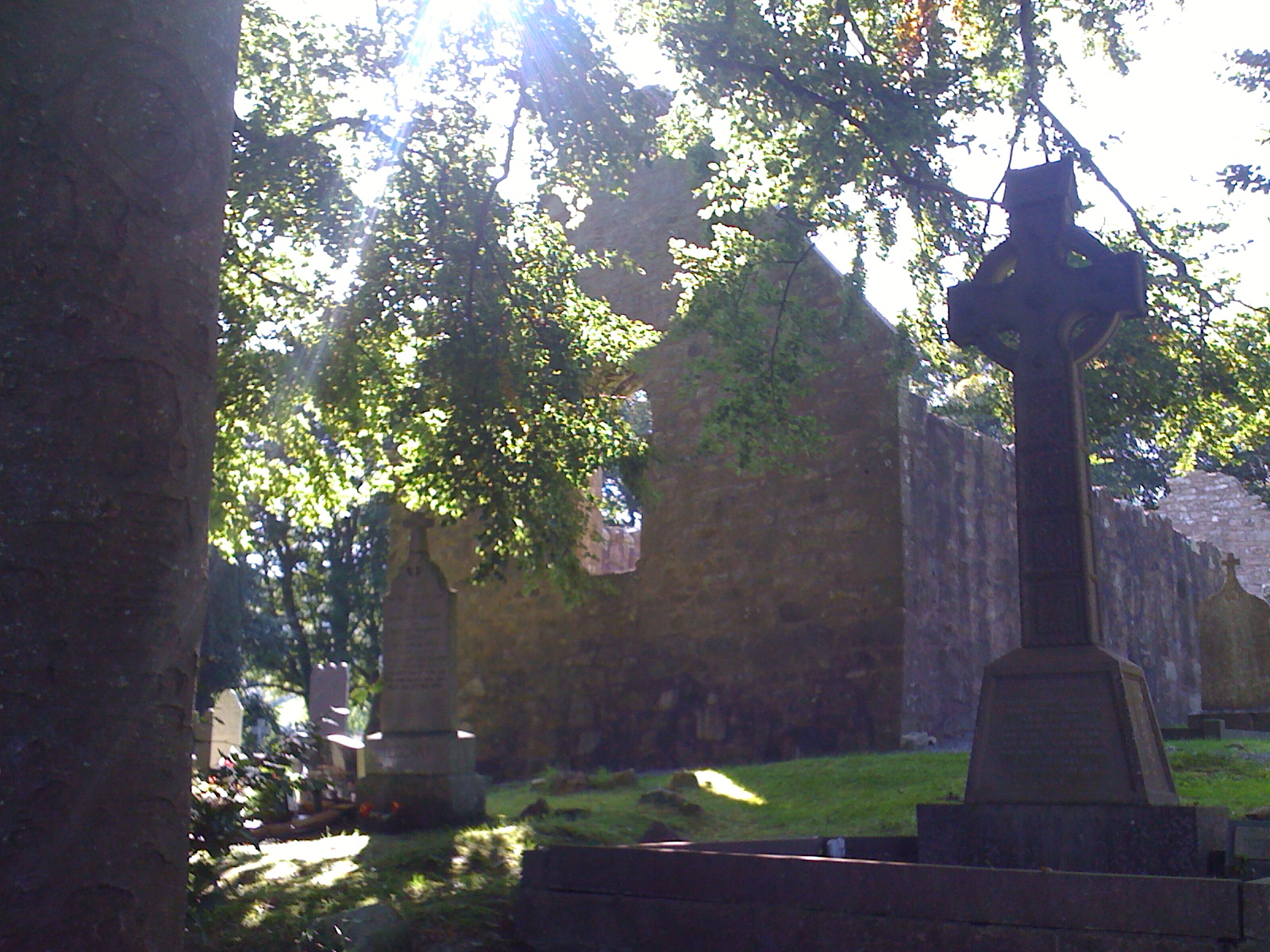
Medieval front of the ruined 6th Century Killeavy Old Church, Killeavy

Roman Catholic priest Fr. Edmund Murphy was stationed in Killeavy, County Armagh, a parish located in the heart of O'Hanlon country. On the instructions of Archbishop Oliver Plunkett, Father Murphy began denouncing all Tories, including the Count and his co-conspirators, from the pulpit.

In a pamphlet printed in London as propaganda for the Titus Oates Plot, Father Murphy alleged that the Count responded by threatening Father Murphy with dire consequences if he did not desist. When Father Murphy ignored the warning, O'Hanlon decreed that any parishioner who attended a Mass offered by the Rector of Killeavy would be fined one cow for the first offence, two for the second offence, and for the third offence would be killed. After this threat was carried out against two Killeavy parishioners, Father Murphy arranged for another priest to take his place and began to spend an increasing amount of time plotting vengeance against Redmond O'Hanlon.

In this Father Murphy was assisted by Cormacke Raver O'Murphy, a former O'Hanlon associate who had begun brazenly robbing travellers who carried the Count's passes and refusing to return the stolen goods or pay the Count's fines. Together, Father Murphy and Cormacke Raver began plotting a means to lure the Count to a location where he could be captured or assassinated. To Father Murphy's outrage, however, Ensign John Smith and Lieutenant Henry Baker, who commanded the local British Army garrison, were profiting considerably from their alliance with O'Hanlon and had no desire to curb the Count's activities.

Ultimately, Cormacke O'Murphy was assassinated by a disgruntled associate who had secretly allied himself with O'Hanlon. Father Murphy, however, was unwilling to give up and, in 1674, his priestly faculties were suspended by Archbishop Plunkett, "for drunkenness and consorting with tories".

As later events were to demonstrate, Archbishop Plunkett may well have had Father Edmund Murphy in mind when he composed the following poem, which remains a classic and often referenced work of Modern literature in Irish:

"Sagairt óir is cailís chrainn
Bhi le linn Phádraig i n-Éirinn;
Sagairt chrainn is cailís óir
I ndeire an domhain dearóil."

"Priests of gold and chalices of wood
Were Ireland's lot in Patrick's time of old,
But now the latter days of our sad world
Have priests of wood and chalices of gold."

== Henry St. John ==
Anglo-Irish landowner Henry St John of Tandragee had inherited the traditional lands of the O'Hanlon clan from his great-uncle, Sir Oliver St John and from his father Sir John St John.

According to the Reverend Lawrence Power, an Anglican clergyman whose St. Mark's Church of Ireland parish in Tandragee stood on Henry St. John's estate and enjoyed his patronage, "Mr. Henry St. John scorned to have any correspondence with such rascals, no not to redeem a stolen horse or cow, he defied and prosecuted them to the uttermost..."

Henry St. John also earned Redmond's undying hatred by continuing his uncle's policy of evicting the Count's clansmen en masse and replacing them with Ulster Scots Protestants. In response, Redmond O'Hanlon retaliated by ordering the mass theft of Henry St John's livestock and the armed robbery of his factors and rent collectors.

Seething with hatred, Henry St. John began waging a private war against the O'Hanlon Gang. The death of his nineteen-year-old son from a chill gained while pursuing the Count only made Henry St. John increasingly brutal toward anyone suspected of aiding Redmond O'Hanlon.

In his letters to The Vatican, Archbishop Oliver Plunkett alleged that tory-hunters like Henry St John spent more time sacking, pillaging, and burning out law-abiding Catholics than actively searching for rapparees and tories. This may have been done, however, to provoke hunted outlaws into coming out of hiding to fight.

According to Stephen Dunford, "The practice of Tory hunting gave rise to some brutal rhymes, still chanted by children today:

"I'll tell you a story about Johnny Magory
He went to the wood and he shot a Tory;
I'll tell you a story about his brother,
He went to the wood and shot another."
"He hunted him in and he hunted him out
Three times through bog and about and about
Till out of the bush he spied a head,
So he levelled his pistol and shot him dead."

On 9 September 1679, St John was riding at Drumlyn Hill near Knockbridge upon his estate with a manservant and the Reverend Power, Vicar of Tandragee. A party of Tories rode into view and seized him. Although Stephen Dunford believes that the intention was simply to hold St. John for ransom, Reverend Power was warned that the landlord would be killed if a rescue was attempted. Moments later, a group of the St. John family's Protestant tenants rode into view and opened fire on the kidnappers. As a result, Henry St John received a pistol ball in the forehead. According to Reverend Power, the fatal shot was fired, point-blank, by the Tory who was leading away Henry St. John's horse.

According to historian Éamonn Ó Ciardha, "Brief reports of St John's death appeared in at least two London newssheets, the True Domestic Intelligence and the Domestic Intelligence."

Rumours among Armagh's Anglo-Irish gentry alleged that the landlord had been slain by friendly fire from his own tenants. It was further said that St. John had dealt dishonourably with local Tories and therefore deserved what he got.

At the landlord's funeral, an outraged Reverend Power denied both claims. He also denounced both the rapparees and the many local Protestant landlords who did business with them. His sermon read in part, "I confess I abhor the thought of it, that English people and Protestants should harbour such pernicious vipers in their bosom. Yet it is certain that some of you do, and that of the better sort too, or else some half-a-score of ruffians could never lurk so long among you, which is such a prodigious shame that you can never wipe out the infamy of it... I reflect upon no individual person, but this I can boldly say in front of you all, that I have heard many of you accuse one another of harbouring this infamous rebels and that they help to furnish your kitchens and tables." Rev. Power climaxed by demanding that local Protestants prove their racial superiority to the native Irish by rising up and destroying the rapparees and Tories.

The full text of Reverend Power's sermon was printed in London as propaganda for the Titus Oates Plot. It was given the name, "The Righteous Man's Portion". Reverend Power also began sending letters to the Lord Deputy of Ireland, James Butler, 1st Duke of Ormonde, and pleaded with him to destroy Redmond O'Hanlon. He further named several prominent aristocrats and Crown officials who had regular dealings with local outlaws.

In one such letter, Rev. Power wrote, "Their chief Redmond O'Hanlon is described as a cunning, dangerous fellow, who, though proclaimed an outlaw along with the rest of his crew and sums of money on their heads, yet he reigns and keeps in subjection so far that is credibly reported, he raises more in a year by contribution than the King's Land, Taxes, and Chimney-Money come to; and thereby is enabled to bribe Clerks and Officers, if not their masters, and makes all to much truckle for him."

In retaliation for Henry St John's assassination, a proclamation was issued by King Charles' Viceroy, the Duke of Ormond, who ordered that the actions of the Tories were to be visited upon the, "wives, fathers, mothers, brothers, and sisters of such of them as shall be out on their keeping, that is not amenable to law and committing them to close prison, until such outlaws shall be either killed or taken". As a result of the ensuing persecution, large numbers of Catholic refugees began fleeing to County Donegal.

According to Ulster's oral tradition, Redmond O'Hanlon travelled to visit his family in Letterkenny, County Donegal, where they were prospering as merchants under the protection of the Chief of Clan O'Doherty and Sir John Conyngham, whose brother David had married Isabel O'Hanlon, the Count's sister. Redmond O'Hanlon remained in Donegal as a guest at Letterkenny Castle until the heat died down over Henry St John's assassination. According to legend, he also had a dalliance with Sir John's daughter. At the conclusion of his visit, O'Hanlon was escorted back to Armagh, under the protection of an armed guard of Sir John Conyngham's men.

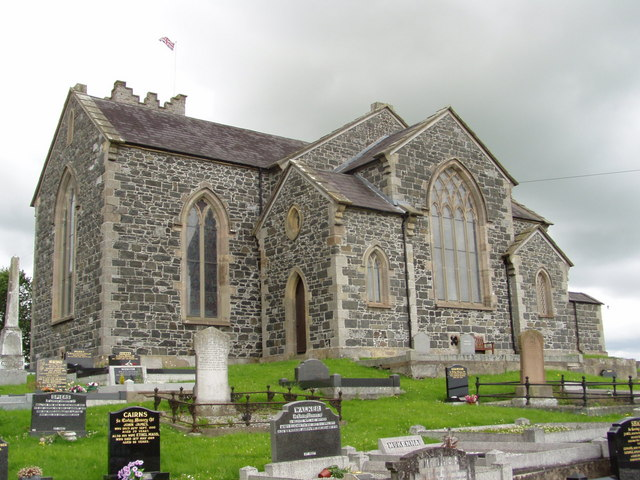
Henry St John's last resting place as it presently appears, Ballymore Parish Church of St Mark, Tandragee, County Armagh.

After Rev. Power's funeral sermon, Henry St John was buried in his family vault, which lay right in front of the pulpit of Ballymore Parish Church of St. Mark in Tandragee. According to the local oral tradition, when the St John vault was opened for his interment, the body of Henry St John's daughter, who had predeceased him, was found out of her coffin and lying at the vault entrance, having, it is believed, been buried alive and then died while trying in vain to escape her tomb. In 1812, the St John vault was reopened and in a box was found a paper sealed in a bottle which read, "This box contains the bones of Henry St. John Esq., Lord of this manor of Ballymore and of his daughter. He rebuilt the church of Tandragee and built this vault."

== Titus Oates plot ==
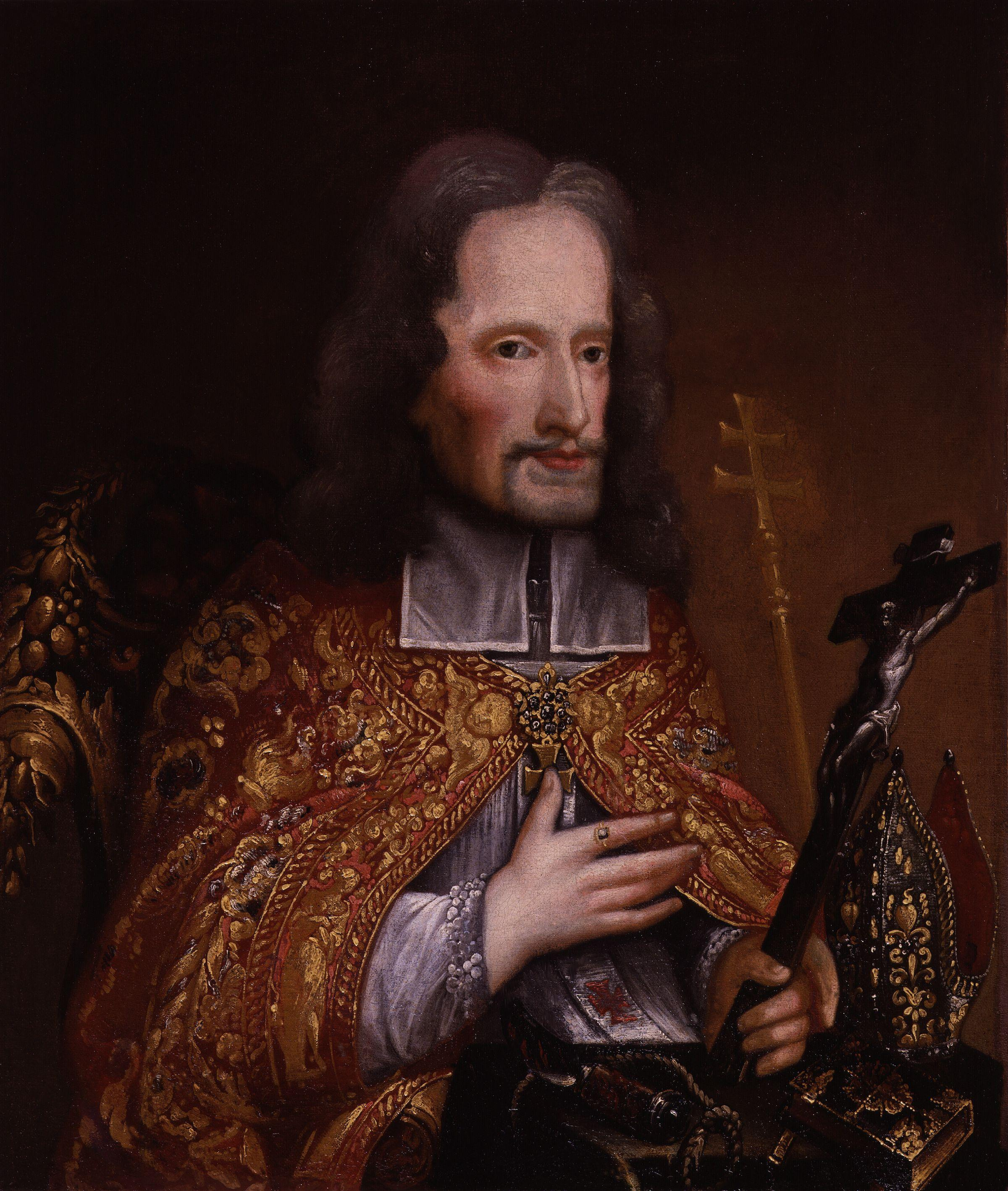
St. Oliver Plunkett, Archbishop of Armagh

In 1678, former Catholic seminarian Titus Oates had gone public with allegations of a non-existent Catholic conspiracy aimed at assassinating King Charles II of England and massacring the Protestants of the British Isles. As a result, more than 22 Catholic clergy and laity were falsely convicted of high treason and executed at Tyburn. The last to be hanged, drawn, and quartered, was Archbishop Oliver Plunkett of Armagh.

In 1680, Father Edmund Murphy agreed to testify falsely as a prosecution witness at the high treason show trial of Archbishop Plunkett. When this became known in Armagh, Ensign Smith and Lt. Baker set out to assassinate the priest. Whether they did so at O'Hanlon's orders remains unknown. However, Father Murphy was placed in Dublin Castle for his own protection. In retaliation, Lt. Baker and Ensign Smith murdered one of Father Murphy's informants and delivered his head to the Lord Deputy as that of a hunted outlaw. To Father Murphy's outrage, they were paid a substantial bounty.

According to John J. Marshall, Redmond O'Hanlon was offered a full pardon by Rev. Henry Jones, the Church of Ireland's Welsh-born Bishop of Meath. Bishop Jones, who Marshall describes as, "an ultra-Protestant", was interested in using the outlaw Count as a witness against Archbishop Plunkett and other alleged Catholic traitors.

According to Stephen Dunford, "O'Hanlon refused. He protested that no offer could induce him to betray an innocent man, even though the man in question had on numerous occasions denounced outlaws: during the General Synod of the Irish Church in 1670, the Archbishop had ordered priests and preachers to warn all their people against, 'giving aid to Tories.'"

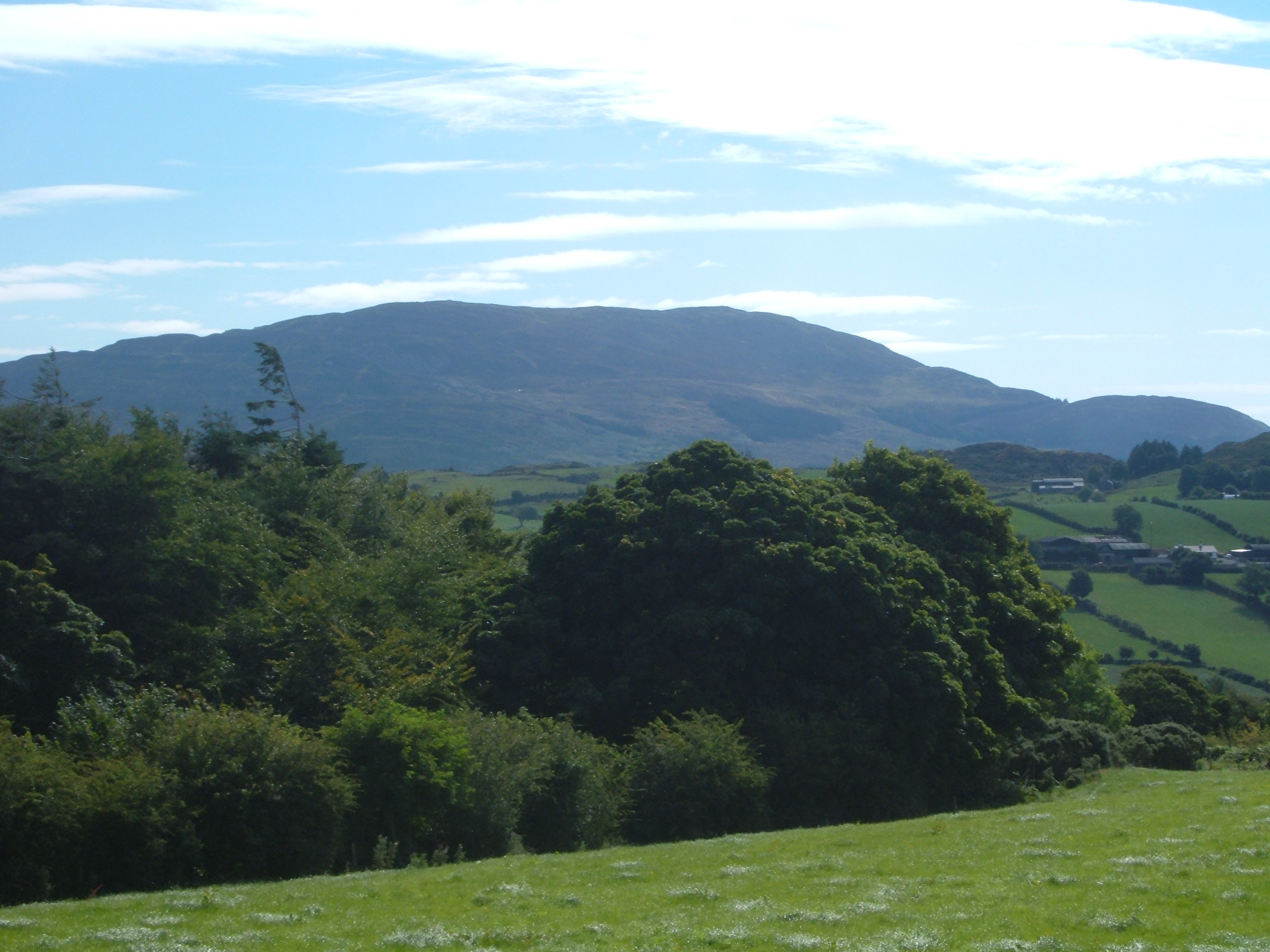
Slieve Gullion.

As persecution of Catholics heated up in reaction to the Titus Oates plot, a priest named Father Mac Aidghalle was murdered while saying Mass at a location still known in Ulster Irish as Cloch na hAltorach; a Mass rock that still stands atop Slieve Gullion. The perpetrators were a band of redcoats under the command of a priest hunter named Turner. Redmond O'Hanlon is said in local tradition to have avenged the murdered priest and in so doing to have sealed his own fate.

== Viceroy's murder plot ==
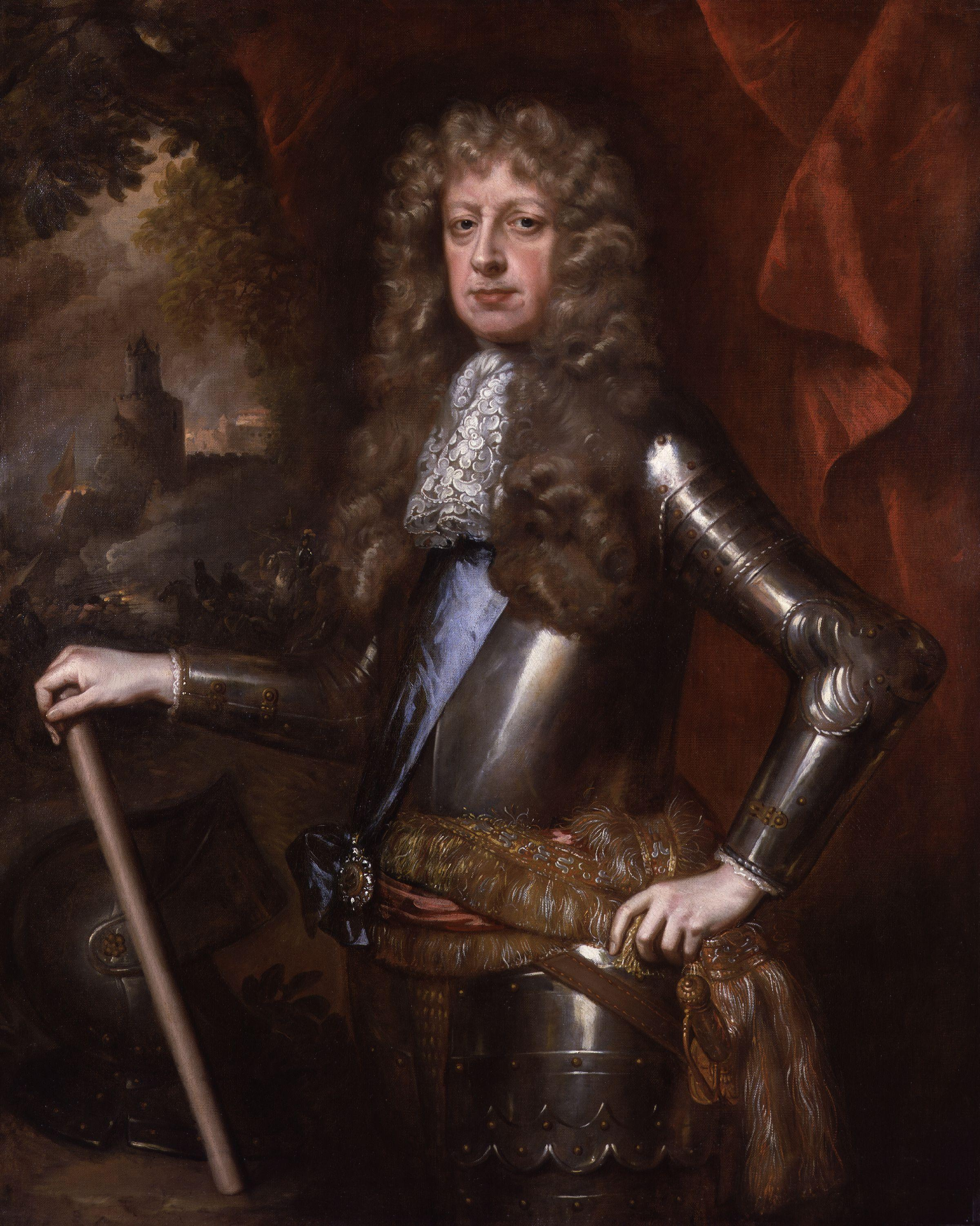
Count Redmond O'Hanlon's nemesis, James Butler, Duke of Ormond.

In the spring of 1680, the Duke of Ormonde ordered one of his Dublin spies to find, "an army man in the Armagh area with the credentials to carry out a dangerous undercover task". At the advice of his agent, the Viceroy selected William Lucas, an Anglo-Irish landlord from Dromantine, County Down. The Lucas family had a long and profitable history with the O'Hanlon gang. Furthermore, Lucas' uncle, Sir Toby Poyntz of Poyntzpass, a justice of the peace, had been named by Rev. Power as one of the outlaw Count's closest associates in the Ulster gentry.

Despite this, the Duke gave Lucas a written statement:

"Whereas William Lucas Gent. hath given me good reason to believe that he is able to do His Majesty good service in the Apprehending, Killing, and Destroying of proclaimed Rebels and Tories; if he may, upon occasion, have the help and assistance of His Majesty's Army, as he shall desire. These are therefore to Will and Require all His Majesty's Officers, Civil and Military, to be aiding and assisting to the said William Lucas in the said service. And I particularly require all Officers of Horse and Foot, to send as many of the Soldiers, under their respective Commands, as he shall desire with him; and to direct such Soldiers to obey his Orders. And I further Authorize the said William Lucas in my Name to give assurance to any of the Tories, that in case they shall assist him in the performance of the said service, that they shall have His Majesty's Gracious Pardon for any Crimes formerly committed by them, Murder only accepted. And that over and above, they shall be well rewarded. Given at His Majesty's Castle of Dublin this 4th of March, 1680. Ormond."

In December 1680, Sir Toby Poyntz and his son Charles arranged for Lucas to speak with Art McCall O'Hanlon, the Count's foster brother and trusted bodyguard. Using the Viceroy's authorisation, Lucas offered Art a full pardon and half of the bounty in exchange for the murder of Count Redmond O'Hanlon. Art O'Hanlon accepted the offer and began searching for an opportune moment. In response, Lucas gave Art a written pardon which explained that the Count's foster brother was under his protection.

== Assassination ==
On 25 April 1681, Count Redmond O'Hanlon was fatally shot by Art MacCall O'Hanlon near Hilltown, County Down. According to the most popular account, the murder took place while the Count was sleeping.

A 1681 pamphlet, however, gives a very different account which it claims comes directly from Art O'Hanlon. According to the pamphlet,

"...the said Art O Hanlan and William O Sheel, in company with Redmond O Hanlan, were near the Eight Mile Bridge in the County of Down, on the score of a Fair that was held there, at which place, while they were watching for their Prey, Redmond took some occasion to quarrel with Art, as they were smoking their pipes, and in the close bid him provide for himself, for he should not be any longer a Tory in any of the three Counties (viz. Monaghan, Down, or Armagh) whereupon Art rose up and said, 'I am very glad of it, and will go just now'; and then taking up his Arms (having his authority and protection on about him) immediately he shot Redmond in the left breast with his carbine, and forthwith ran to the Eight Mile Bridge for a Guard, but Art returned with a Guard, and Mr. Lucas, who soon had notice in Newry where he was waiting for Redmond's motions, for the same Ensign found Redmond's body, but the head was taken off by O Sheel, who fled with it, the body they removed to Newry, where it lies under a Guard till Orders be sent how it should be disposed of; and since that Mr. Lucas has sent out a Protection and Assurance to O Sheel, to bring in the Head of that Arch-Traitor and Tory Redmond O Hanlan."

After William O'Sheel surrendered it to William Lucas, Redmond O'Hanlon's head was displayed on a spike upon Downpatrick jail. According to the local oral tradition as first recorded in 1926, the Count's headless body was buried in the Roman Catholic cemetery at Ballynaleck, along the road between Tandragee and Scarva.

Art McCall O'Hanlon received a full pardon and one hundred pounds from the Lord Deputy for murdering his foster brother. William Lucas received a Lieutenant's commission. However, Lieutenant William Lucas continued to hunt down and summarily execute large numbers of real and imagined outlaws and collected bounties for their heads. Art O'Hanlon and William O'Sheel acted as his "spotters". This led, according to Marshall, to, "a veritable reign of terror", in the three counties, "especially among the native Irish".

On 29 May 1681, Captain Thomas Whitney, an officer stationed in Tandragee, wrote the following words to the Duke of Ormonde,

"...the natives, who never durst trust themselves with their houses nor homes since the death of the boy of fifteen or sixteen years, who was killed lately near Newry, and his head sent for a Tory's head to Armagh. My Lord, I endeavoured by all the means I could to take off their fear, and told them that Your Grace upon notice of the wrongs done them by those that pretend authorities of Your Grace for doing service, require a relation of your inquiries from Sir George Rawdon, Sir Hans Hamilton, and others. My Lord, this day I saw a boy of thirteen years old come to Sir Hans Hamilton, and begged upon his hands and knees that his life be secured for that he was returned a Tory and Art O'Hanlon was in search for him to cut off his head. My Lord, several poor people whose cattle and goods the Mullens of Tandragee took, and others who were like to starve, I had restored. My Lord, very sad and great wrongs there is done and in these parts, and will be more unless speedily enquired into."

== Family ==
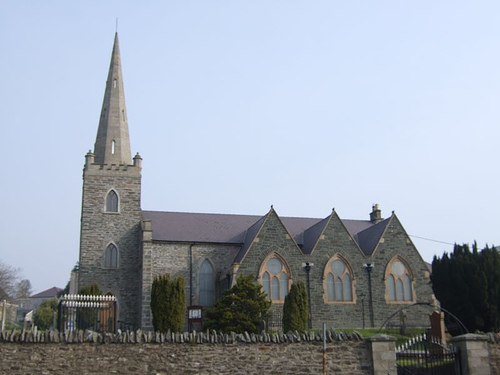
Conwal Parish Church, Letterkenny, County Donegal.

According to legend, the Count's mother travelled to Downpatrick Gaol and composed an Irish language keen upon seeing her son's head on a spike. Stephen Dunford gives the following translation:

"Dear head of my darling,
How gory and pale;
These aged eyes see thee,
High spiked on their jail.
That cheek in the summer,
No more will grow warm;
Nor that eye e'er catch light,
But the flash of the storm."

According to tradition, the O'Hanlon and Conyngham families travelled to Ballynabeck, exhumed the Count's remains, and buried them in a family plot in Conwal Parish Church cemetery in Letterkenny, County Donegal. The site, near the Vestry door, is marked by a flat gravestone inscribed with the O'Hanlon coat of arms.

The inscription reads:

"The five sons of Redmond Hanlen, Mercht. in Letterkenny: John, the firstborn, Alexander, Francis, John and Redmond. Also here lieth the body of William, the son of the aforesaid Redmond Hanlen who departed this life the 27th ...1708, aged ...3 years ...months and 14 days. Also the remains of David Conyngham, Gent., and Cath., his wife, a daughter to Redmond Hanlen. They were esteemed more for goodness of heart than for affluence of fortune. Died lamented here on ...December 1752, 72 years old. She 21st August, 1775, aged 80."

== Folklore ==
- Redmond O'Hanlon's popularity was immortalised in the pulp fiction of the era in addition to folktales which survive to the present day. The legends focus on his ability to humiliate the Anglo-Irish gentry and the redcoats.
- According to historian Éamonn Ó Ciardha, "Although O'Hanlon was a symptom of the distorted condition of Ireland in the seventeenth century, his methods and destructiveness cannot be taken as typical of the activities of others of his kind, and none of his fellow outlaws made such an imprint on Irish folklore and romantic legend. This influence can be best explained by the nature of many of his deceptions, his aristocratic bearing and apparel, and the diligence with which many of his deeds were catalogued... In the neighbourhood of his former haunts many a cave is named for him on the claim that he hid there."
- In local Irish folklore, ghost stories about sightings of Redmond O'Hanlon riding on horseback are still commonly told in County Armagh.

== In popular culture ==
According to Éamonn Ó Ciardha, "The growth of his legend can be attributed to John Cosgrove's A genuine history of the lives and actions of the most notorious Irish highwaymen, tories and rapparees, first published in 1747 and reprinted many times in the eighteenth and nineteenth centuries... and the inclusion of O'Hanlon by Thomas Clarke Luby in The lives and times of illustrious and representative Irishmen (1878)."

According to D. J. O'Donoghue's account of his 1825 Irish tour, Sir Walter Scott was fascinated by the life and career of Redmond O'Hanlon. Hoping to make him the protagonist of an adventure novel, Scott corresponded with Lady Olivia Sparrow, an Anglo-Irish landowner from County Down. Although Scott asked Lady Sparrow to obtain as much information as possible about O'Hanlon, he was forced to give up on the project after finding documentation too scanty.

In 1862, William Carleton published Redmond Count O'Hanlon; The Irish Rapparee, an adventure novel inspired by the outlaw Count's life. One of Carleton's biographers alleges that the novelist glorified a 17th-century rapparee because he did not feel able to praise the Ribbonmen of his own era. According to O'Donoghue, however, Carleton's novel does not depict the historical Redmond O'Hanlon, but rather a figure of his own imagination.

More recently, Count Redmond O'Hanlon's name is mentioned in The Ballad of Douglas Bridge by Francis Carlin. His career is also celebrated in folk songs composed by P.J. McCall and Tommy Makem.

In Poyntzpass, County Armagh, the local Gaelic football team is named "The Redmond O'Hanlons" in his honour. Furthermore, O'Hanlon's life was the subject of an episode of the television documentary series "Rapairí", which aired on TG4 in November 2009.

In 2019, Michael Kerrigan published An Universal Wolf: The Life & Times of Redmond O'Hanlon. It is a historical novel that is based on real people and actual events. Part fact, part legend, the tale is composed of history, myth, and conjecture. Persons and events described within it relate to an obscure but significant period in Irish history: significant because the struggle between the natives and the settlers that began with the Plantation of Ulster continues still, 400 years later. Traced back to the original Norman Invasion of Ireland in 1169, however, establishes The Troubles as the longest-lived conflict in the history of the world.
