= Battersea Grammar School =

Location
- Abbotswood Road; Streatham, London, SW16; England
- 51.435°N 0.138°W

Information
- Type: Grammar
- Motto: Rather Deathe than False of Faythe
- Established: 1875
- Closed: 1977
- Local authority: ILEA
- Headmaster: John A. Phillips
- Staff: c. 40
- Gender: Boys
- Age: 11 to 18
- Enrolment: c. 540
- Houses: 6
- Badge: Gold falcon rising

Battersea Grammar School was a Voluntary-Controlled Secondary Grammar School in South London. It was established in Battersea in 1875 by the Sir Walter St John Trust and moved to larger premises in Streatham in 1936.

The school closed when it was amalgamated with Rosa Bassett School, a grammar school for girls, in 1977 to create the new Furzedown Secondary School, a mixed comprehensive school in Tooting.

== History ==
=== Beginnings ===
Although the school was only formally established in 1875 it shares its early history with that of the Sir Walter St John's School in Battersea. The joint history dates back to the late 1660s, when Sir Walter St John, 3rd Baronet founded a school on his estate at Battersea. Sir Walter assured the future of his school by means of an endowment signed on the 7 September 1700, stating in the trust deed that "being minded to found and forever to establish a charity in the said Parish of Battersea, wherein he now dwelleth for the benefit of the said Parish and Towne, Battersea, and to erect and endow a school for the Education of 20 Free Scholars, he gave a house and garden to be forever hereafter used as a school house for the teaching of scholars therein." The scholars were "to be elected and putt into the said schoole in a mannere hereinafter mentioned to read write and to cast accounts."

The establishment of Battersea Grammar as a separate school was prompted by the changes resulting from the Elementary Education Act 1870. There was considerable debate as to how best to proceed, but eventually a proposal for a new trust scheme, under the Endowed Schools Act 1869, was put before Parliament and approved at a meeting of the Privy Council on the 9 August 1873.

The new scheme would create a new Upper School, with the existing site housing a public elementary school and a new middle school if the governors so decided. A building for the new school was purchased in 1874, and the post of headmaster of the Sir Walter St John's Upper School advertised. Edmund A. Richardson, was appointed to the post on 19 January 1875 and the school opened on 12 April 1875. The old school continued to be known as the Sir Walter St John's School, with both schools under the control of the Sir Walter St John's Schools Trust.

The name Battersea Grammar School was not formally recorded in the scheme of the trust until 1893, however the school had been known by that name almost from the beginning.

=== Development and relocation ===
The first few years of the new Battersea Grammar School were not promising, with the number of pupils declining and proposals to close the school. The appointment of William H. Bindley as headmaster in 1880 or 1881 (sources disagree) turned matters around in both the quality of education and pupil numbers, which increased from 48 in 1881 to 160 by 1891.

The original school building purchased to house Battersea Grammar School was known as St John's Lodge and stood on St John's Hill, on the corner of Plough Road, Battersea. This was enlarged by the addition of an East Wing in 1906 as the number of pupils rose to 250, and pupil numbers increased still further, reaching 450 by 1919.

The St John's Hill site had become increasingly constrained, as land had been purchased from the school by the London and South Western Railway as it expanded around Clapham Junction railway station. Although there had been earlier proposals to move, a decision was not made until 1935, when the LCC offered a site on Abbotswood Road in Streatham.

Plans for a new building to accommodate 540 pupils, designed by J. E. K. Harrison, a former pupil of the school, were quickly approved and in September 1936 the school moved to its new location.

=== War years ===
The outbreak of the Second World War in 1939 prompted the evacuation of the school from Abbotswood Road. The school initially moved to Worthing, where it was accommodated by Worthing Grammar School. The worsening outlook in 1940 resulted in another move in the middle of that year, this time to Hertford, where it shared the buildings of Hertford Grammar School.

The school remained in Hertford until early 1945, when it moved back to Abbotswood Road. The return to Streatham also saw the retirement of Henry Ellis, who had taken over as headmaster from William Bindley in 1918, and he was succeeded by Walter Langford.

The war years also saw a significant change in the governance of the school in response to the Education Act 1944. Up until that time the school had been an aided school under the control of the Sir Walter St John's Schools Trust, but the new Act led to the school becoming voluntary-controlled, which gave the local education authority (then the LCC, later the ILEA) ten seats on the school's governing body, while the trust retained only five representatives.

=== Amalgamation and closure ===
With the abolition of the Tripartite System, the Inner London Education Authority took the decision to move to a fully comprehensive system of education. In the case of Battersea Grammar School this was achieved in 1977 by an amalgamation with the Rosa Bassett School, a grammar school for girls, and a move to a new site to create Furzedown Secondary School. The majority of the teaching staff transferred to the new comprehensive school.

Following the amalgamation with Rosa Bassett School, the Abbotswood Road site was no longer used by the new school, with the exception of the playing fields there. Then, from 1977 until its dissolution in 1991, the South West London College of Further Education occupied the site. Since 1994 the Abbotswood Road site has been the home of the Senior Department (sixth form) of the Streatham and Clapham High School.

== Headmasters ==
- 1875–c. 1878: Edmund A. Richardson
- c. 1878–1880: Jefferson (?)
- 1880–1918: William Henry Bindley
- 1918–1945: Henry Russell Ellis (acting headmaster 1918–1920)
- 1945–1965: Walter James Langford, d. 1996
- 1965–1972: James (Jim) Patrick Cowan, d. 22 March 1979
- 1972–1973: Edward Gerald Cooley (acting headmaster), d. 12 January 1989
- 1973–1977: John A. Phillips

There is some disagreement between the sources as to the date on which W. H. Bindley took over as headmaster; it was either 1880 or 1881. He had been a master at the school since its establishment in 1875.

== House system ==
A system of four houses was established in 1907. The houses were:

- St John's – named after the founder of the original school, Sir Walter St John.
- Bolingbroke – named after Sir Walter's grandson Henry St John, 1st Viscount Bolingbroke.
- Spencer – after the later lords of the manor of Battersea, the manor having been bought from the last St John in 1763 by John, Viscount Spencer.
- Trinity – named after a church in the district.

In 1919 two additional houses were created:

- Erskine – after Canon John Erskine Clarke, a former vicar of Battersea and member of the Sir Walter St John Trust at the time of the establishment of the school.
- Dawnay – after Sir Archibald Davis Dawnay, Mayor of Wandsworth from 1908 until his death on 23 April 1919 and a benefactor of the school.

House colours were:

- St John's – dark blue
- Bolingbroke – yellow
- Spencer – green
- Trinity – red
- Erskine – pale blue
- Dawnay – purple

== Insignia and motto ==
Both Battersea Grammar and the Sir Walter St John's School used the arms of their founder Sir Walter St John, 3rd Baronet, although in slightly modified forms. The motto Rather Deathe than False of Faythe appears to have been a later addition. Graveney School (which was formed from several schools, including Battersea Grammar) still has the motto above the war memorial.

For its blazer badge the school took the gold falcon from the crest of Sir Walter's arms. The crest was changed in 1959 from a gold falcon rising, wings displayed and inverted, to one rising with wings elevated and addorsed. The falcon is ducally gorged with a red, three-pointed crown around its neck, and belled in gold with red jesses.

== Former pupils ==
- Anthony Allen, chief executive of the NHBC from 1994 to 1996
- Robert Audley, professor of psychology at University College London from 1964 to 1995, president of the British Psychological Society from 1969 to 1970, and editor of the British Journal of Mathematical and Statistical Psychology from 1965 to 1970
- Michael R. Ayers, professor of philosophy at the University of Oxford from 1996 to 2002
- Robert Bartlett, professor of history at St Andrews University
- Colin Bennetts, clergyman and Bishop of Coventry from 1998 to 2008
- C. W. A. Scott, aviator, winner of the 1934 MacRobertson Air Race
- Gerald Bowden, Conservative MP for Dulwich from 1983 to 1992
- Bobby Brown, professional footballer
- Michael Bryant, actor
- Oliver Bulman, Woodwardian Professor of Geology at the University of Cambridge from 1955 to 1966, and president of the Palaeontological Association from 1960 to 1962
- Philip Bunker, theoretical chemist and molecular spectroscopist
- Sir Norman Costar, High Commissioner to Cyprus from 1967 to 1969 and to Trinidad and Tobago from 1962 to 1966
- Maurice Cowling, historian
- David Currie, Baron Currie of Marylebone, chairman of Ofcom from 2002 to 2009
- Steven Downes, journalist
- John Gloag, architect
- Sir Walter Godfrey, ambassador to South Korea from 1961 to 1966
- Hugh Gray, Labour MP for Great Yarmouth from 1966 to 1970
- John Howell, Conservative MP for Henley since 2008
- Phillip Jones, musician, musical administrator, leader of the Phillip Jones Brass Ensemble
- Bernard Knox, classical scholar
- Sir Frederick Lawton, Lord Justice of Appeal 1972–86
- Raymond Mander, theatre journalist
- Albert Mansbridge, founded the Workers' Educational Association in 1903
- Sir Roger Moore, actor
- Reg Revans, 1928 Olympic athlete and pioneer of Action Learning
- Trevor Robbins, professor of experimental psychology at the University of Cambridge since 2002
- Bryan Robertson, art curator and manager
- Ronald Robinson, historian and Beit Professor of the History of the British Commonwealth at the University of Oxford from 1971 to 1987
- Leroy Rosenior, professional footballer for Fulham, QPR and Sierra Leone, and manager
- Mike Selvey, cricketer for Middlesex, Glamorgan and England, and cricket correspondent of The Guardian
- Adrian Sindall, ambassador to Syria from 1994 to 1996, and High Commissioner to Brunei from 1991 to 1994
- David Smith, cricketer for Surrey, Worcestershire, Sussex and England
- Edward Thomas, poet
- Clark Tracey, jazz drummer
- John Yates, Bishop of Gloucester from 1975 to 1991
