= Henry St John of Tandragee =

Irish landowner

- Born: July 1628
- Died: 9 September 1679 (aged 51)
- Spouse: Catherine St John of Longthorpe
- Parents: Sir John St John, 1st Baronet (father); Anne Leighton (mother)

Henry St John of Tandragee (July 1628 – 9 September 1679) was the owner of Tandragee Castle and manor of Ballymore. He was assassinated upon his estate of Drumlyn Hill, near Knockbridge, on the orders of local Rapparee leader Redmond O'Hanlon.

== Manor of Ballymore ==
Henry St John inherited the manor of Ballymore from his great-uncle, Sir Oliver St John and from his father Sir John St John.

== Assassination ==
On September 9, 1679, St. John was horse riding on his estate of Drumlyn Hill, near Knockbridge, accompanied by a manservant and Reverend Power, the Vicar of Tandragee. Suddenly, a group of followers of Redmond O'Hanlon, known as Tories, appeared and abducted him. Reverend Power was warned that Henry St. John would be killed if any rescue attempt was made. Shortly thereafter, a group of Protestant tenants from the St. John family arrived and opened fire on the abductors. As a result, Henry St. John was struck in the forehead by a bullet. Reverend Power later stated that the lethal shot was fired at point-blank by the Tory who was leading away St. John's horse.

Reports regarding St John's death were published in at least two London newspapers, namely the True Domestic Intelligence and the Domestic Intelligence.

In response to the assassination of Henry St John, a proclamation was released by King Charles' Viceroy, the Duke of Ormond. He mandated that the actions of the Tories would be exacted upon the "wives, fathers, mothers, brothers, and sisters of such of them as shall be out on their keeping, that is not amenable to law and committing them to close prison, until such outlaws shall be either killed or taken" Consequently, this wave of persecution led to a significant number of Catholic refugees seeking safety in County Donegal.

== St John vault ==
The St. John vault, situated at Ballymore Parish Church, was constructed by Henry St. John. His daughter was the first individual interred there.

According to local oral tradition, when the vault was opened for Henry St. John's burial, his daughter's body was found outside her coffin at the entrance. It is believed she had been buried alive and died while trying to escape her grave.

In 1812, the St. John vault was reopened, uncovering a box that held a paper sealed in a bottle. The note read, "This box contains the bones of Henry St. John Esq., Lord of this manor of Ballymore and of his daughter. He rebuilt the church of Tandragee and built this vault."

In 1911, Reverend J. B. Leslie noted that the St. John vault was positioned in front of the pulpit. However, as there is no remaining evidence of its existence, it is presumed to have been covered during the replacement of the sandstone flags in the church in 1926.

== Family ==
Henry St. John married his second cousin Catherine St John of Longthorpe, daughter of Oliver St John of Longthorpe. He was the 13th child of Sir John St John and Anne Leighton, with his mother dying while giving birth to him. His great uncle was Sir Oliver St John, 1st Viscount Grandison, who was the Lord Deputy of Ireland.
