= Graveney School =

Location
- Welham Road; Tooting, London, SW17 9BU; England
- 51.4235°N 0.151°W

Information
- Type: Academy
- Motto: "Committed to excellence"
- Established: 1669
- Department for Education URN: 137005 Tables
- Ofsted: Reports
- Chair of the Governors: Ian Parkes
- Principal: Cynthia Rickman
- Staff: c. 200
- Gender: Mixed
- Age: 11 to 18
- Enrolment: 2259
- Houses: St. John's, Rosa Bassett, Ensham, Furzedown, Battersea
- Colours: Black, gold and blue
- School fees: None
- Website: www.graveney.org

Graveney School is a secondary school and sixth form with academy status in the Furzedown area of Tooting, southwest London, England. The school has a partially selective admissions policy. At the beginning of 2023, the school was assessed in an Ofsted inspection report as outstanding.

== History ==
Graveney School can trace its origins back to a school founded in the late 1660s by Sir Walter St John, 3rd Baronet, in Battersea, and the modern Graveney was established in 1986 as an amalgamation of Ensham School (for girls) and Furzedown Secondary School (mixed). Furzedown was formed in 1977 as an amalgamation of Battersea Grammar School (for boys) and Rosa Bassett School (for girls).

Created as a standard comprehensive school under the control of the local education authority (initially the ILEA, later Wandsworth), a significant change occurred in 1991 when Graveney became a grant-maintained school, giving far greater control to the school governors. Following the changes resulting from the School Standards and Framework Act 1998, which abolished grant-maintained status, the school preserved a degree of independence by electing to become a foundation school.

The school achieved Technology College status in 1995 and also moved to a partially selective admissions policy in September of that year. From the introduction of selection the school was permitted to choose up to 50% of pupils by ability; however, this was reduced to 25% in 2000, increased to 30% in 2001 and reduced back to 25% in 2004, Graveney School converted to become an academy on 1 August 2011.

== Years 7 to 11 ==
When students begin their education at Graveney in Year 7, they are placed into sets depending on their Year 6 SATs and their Wandsworth test result. After Christmas of year 9, usually February, students pick their GCSE options. English Language and Literature, Maths, Science, Religious Studies and PE are compulsory for the two years.

== The sixth form ==
The sixth form offers a range of subjects, including some that are not available at GCSE, such as Film studies, Government & Politics, Further Mathematics, Philosophy, Photography and Psychology. Students can also retake GCSEs in Mathematics and English. The sixth form has minimum entry requirements of 5 A*-Cs at GCSE level for internal students. For a student to graduate from year 12 to year 13, they must have attained minimum grades of two Es at AS level.

== Site and buildings ==
Graveney initially operated on both the former Furzedown and Ensham sites; however, the Ensham building was closed and the school now occupies what was Furzedown Secondary School on either side of Welham Road in Tooting, south west London.

The part of the site on the southern side of Welham Road is the former Rosa Bassett School, the main building of which was opened in 1913. The larger area to the north of the road is the former Furzedown Training College (a teacher training college), which was opened in 1915. The buildings surround a tree-lined campus and include Furzedown House, a Grade II-listed Georgian house, built in 1794.

The other buildings include: Red House, College House, Lower School, Upper Science, Lower Science, Atkins Technology Centre, the Tech block, an independent study centre, Bradford House, The Oppenheimer Observatory, a sports hall and a multigym.

On the north side of Welham Road, there is also a recreation area which is owned by Wandsworth Council but used by Graveney during school hours for Sports Studies and PE lessons. The area consists of a small 80 metre running track, with a sandpit for jumps, an astro turf pitch, 2 tennis courts which can be converted into another pitch and a cricket area. It also has a netball court however in summer 2025 the school installed 2 padel courts over, leading to the court being inactive.

== 7 Hours on Earth ==
Between 2017 and 2020, students and staff made a film about aliens, 7 Hours on Earth, which was released worldwide as an independent film. It is an adaptation of A Midsummer Night's Dream, with the fairies reimagined as aliens.

== Headteachers and principals ==
- 1986 –1989 John A. Phillips
- 1989 – 2019 Graham Stapleton
- 2019 – Cynthia Rickman

== Notable alumni ==
- Dami Bakare, volleyball player
- Grace Wales Bonner, fashion designer
- Otto Farrant, actor
- Ethan Hayter, road and track cyclist
- Quillan Isidore, BMX rider
- Ramona Marquez, Outnumbered actress
- Naga Munchetty, journalist, newsreader on BBC News, TV presenter
- Amol Rajan, BBC Media Editor and former editor of The Independent newspaper
- Kyle Sinckler, rugby union player
- Hero Fiennes Tiffin, actor
- Jamael Westman, actor
