= Henry St John, 1st Viscount St John =

English politician

The Right Honourable The Viscount St John
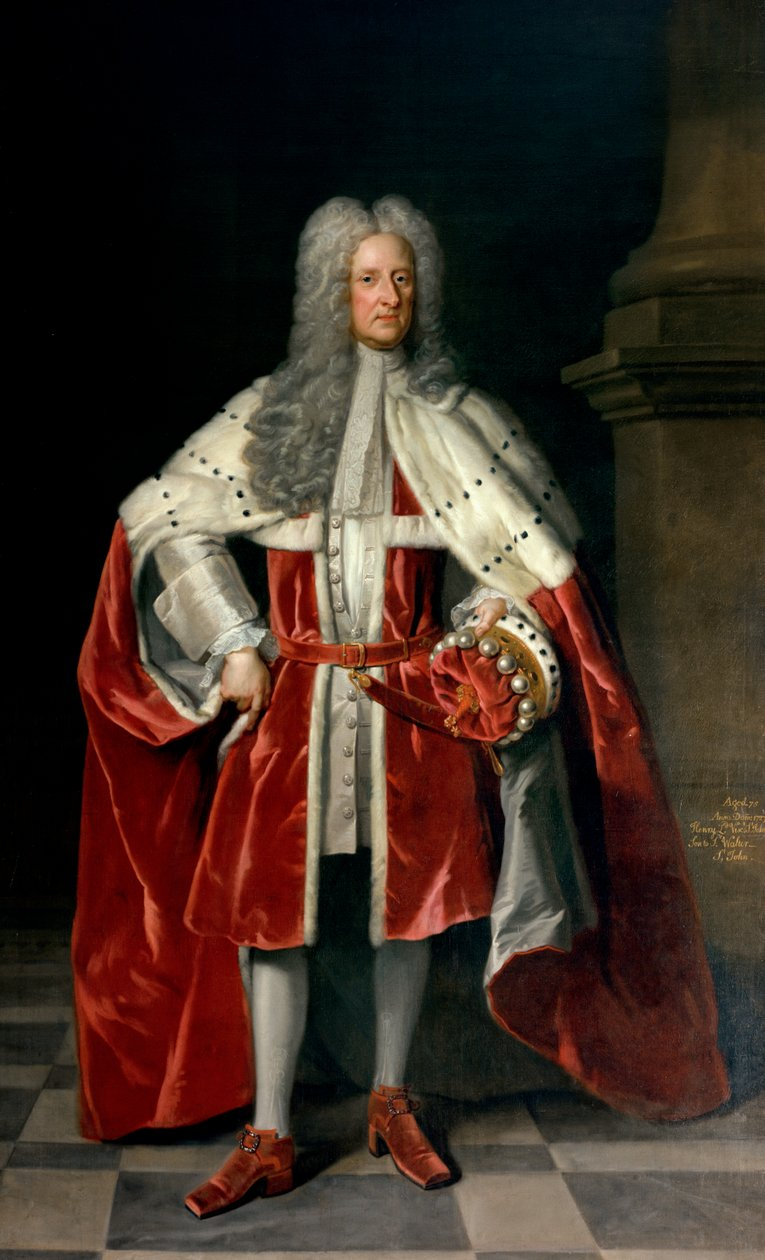
- Portrait of St John by Godfrey Kneller
- Monarch: Queen Anne
- Preceded by: Robert Harley, 1st Earl of Oxford and Earl Mortimer
- Succeeded by: Charles Townshend, 2nd Viscount Townshend

Personal details
- Born: 16 September 1678 Battersea, London, England
- Died: 12 December 1751 (aged 73) Battersea, London, England
- Spouse: Frances Winchcombe (m. 1701)
- Education: Eton College
- Known for: Politics

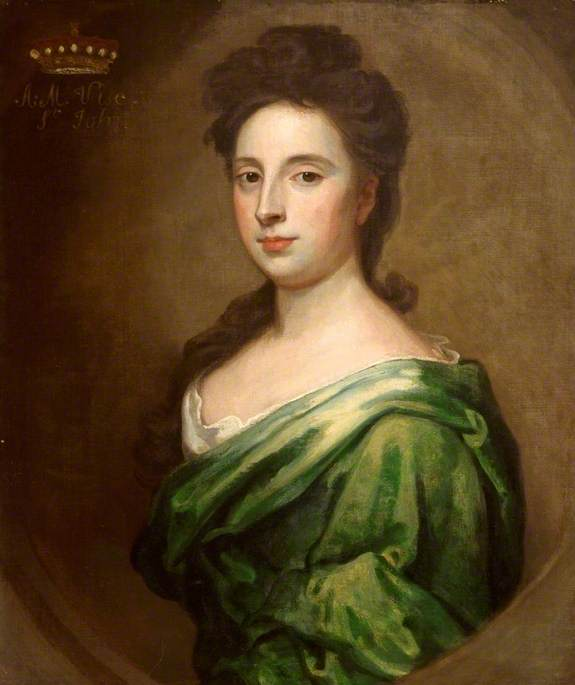
Angelica Wharton, née Pelissary, Henry St John's second wife

Henry St. John, 1st Viscount St. John DL (October 1652 – 8 April 1742) was an English politician. In 1685 he was pardoned for a murder.

== Early life and education ==
St John was born in 1652, first son of Sir Walter St John, 3rd Baronet and his wife Johanna.

He was educated at Eton College and at Cambridge University where he attended Caius College in 1668-69 and graduated M.A. at St John's College in 1669. He was awarded a later degree as D.C.L. at Oxford University in 1702.

== Political career ==
He was a Member (MP) of the Parliament of England for Wootton Bassett October 1679–March 1681, 1685–87, 1689–95 and 1698–1700 and for Wiltshire 1695–98. He also served as a Deputy Lieutenant (DL) from 1683 and Justice of the Peace (JP) from 1685 for the county of Wiltshire

== Murder case ==
In November 1684 he was the principal figure in a singularly disgraceful brawl, which followed the acquittal of Edward Nosworthy. The trial's jury repaired to the Globe tavern in Fleet Street to celebrate. While there, an altercation broke out between St John and Francis Stonehouse, the argument reportedly "a discourse about leaping horses" which terminated in the death of the jury foreman, Sir William Estcourt. St. John and Edmund Webb, who had both run Estcourt through with their swords, were found guilty of murder, and condemned to death. St. John's mother obtained a pardon for him at the reported price of £16,000. St. John was expected to go abroad for some time, but publicly entered the next parliamentary election at Wootton Bassett a few weeks after the close of his case, and was duly elected to James II’s first Parliament.

== Family, peerage and death ==
St John was twice married:

- 1st, on 11 December 1673, Lady Mary Rich (died 30 September 1678), daughter and coheir of Robert Rich, 3rd Earl of Warwick, by whom he had one son, Henry, later made Viscount Bolingbroke in 1712.
- 2nd, on 1 January 1687, Angelica Magdalena (died 5 August 1736), daughter of Claude Pellissary, treasurer-general of the galleys to Louis XIV, and widow of Philip Wharton of Edlington, Yorkshire, by whom he had three sons (two of whom died in their father's lifetime) and one daughter, Henrietta Knight, Lady Luxborough. The surviving son was John St John, 2nd Viscount St John, father of Frederick St John, 2nd Viscount Bolingbroke, 3rd Viscount St John.

St John succeeded his father as 4th Baronet on the latter's death in 1708, then on 2 July 1716 he was created a peer as 1st Viscount St John, elevating him to the House of Lords.

Viscount St John died 8 April 1742, aged 89, and was buried at St Mary's Church, Battersea.

Peerage of Great Britain
New creation	Viscount St John; 1716–1742	Succeeded by John St John
Baronetage of England
Preceded by Walter St John	Baronet (of Lydiard Tregoze); 1708–1742	Succeeded by John St John
