= Rosa Bassett School =

Location
- Welham Road; Tooting, London, SW17 9BU; England; 51.423°N 0.152°W

Information
- Type: Grammar
- Motto: Honesta Obtinete ("Hold Fast To That Which Is Good" cf. 1 Thess. 5:21)
- Established: 1906
- Closed: 1977
- Local authority: ILEA
- Headmistress: Kathleen Shores Dougill
- Staff: c. 40
- Gender: Girls
- Age: 11 to 18
- Enrolment: c. 700
- Houses: Buff, Dark Blue, Light Blue, Green, Grey, Orange
- Publication: The Pimpernel
- Badge: Scarlet pimpernel

Rosa Bassett School was a grammar school for girls in South London. Established in 1906 in Stockwell as the Stockwell County Secondary School, in 1913 it moved to Welham Road on the boundary between Streatham and Tooting. It was renamed the County Secondary School, Streatham, and was often referred to as Streatham County Secondary School or Streatham Secondary School. It was again renamed in 1951, after the first headmistress, Rosa Bassett.

The school closed when in 1977 it was amalgamated with Battersea Grammar School, a school for boys, creating the new Furzedown Secondary School, a mixed comprehensive school, incorporating the Rosa Bassett buildings into a larger site.

== History ==
=== Early years and Dalton Plan ===
The school was originally located in Durand Gardens, SW9, Stockwell, where it was known as Stockwell County Secondary School. It transferred to a new building on Welham Road, SW17, in 1913, changing its name to the County Secondary School, Streatham.

The school's first headmistress, Rosa Bassett, encouraged self-reliance and personal responsibility in the school's pupils. This pattern was deepened when, in 1920, Bassett introduced the use of the Dalton Plan to the school. The Dalton Plan was a system of education developed in Massachusetts by Helen Parkhurst which moved away from traditional, rigid, class-based teaching, allowing for teaching to be adjusted to the pace of each individual child.

The introduction of the Dalton Plan to an English school resulted in considerable interest, and when, following Parkhurst's visit to England in 1921, the school opened its doors to visitors, over a thousand people attended over three days. The experiences of the staff and pupils during this period were recorded by Rosa Bassett in a chapter in Parkhurst's book and were also described by Evelyn Dewey in her book on the Dalton Plan.

=== Further development ===
Following Rosa Bassett's early death in 1925 the school's new headmistress, Muriel Davies, continued the principles of the Dalton Plan, although in somewhat modified form. Miss Davies continued at the school until 1947, seeing it though World War II. During the war the school was evacuated to Chichester, sharing accommodation with the High School for Boys (now Chichester High School for Boys), between 1939 and 1943.

Hockey field and school gymnasium (architect: Trevor Dannatt, 1964)

The application of the principles of the Dalton Plan continued under the next headmistress, Laura C. Jewill Hill, who remained at the school until 1963, when she was succeeded by Kathleen S. Dougill. Facilities at the school were improved by the addition of a new gymnasium and separate science building, both designed by the architect Trevor Dannatt, RA, in 1964.

The influence of the first headmistress in introducing the Dalton Plan was recognised in 1951, when the school was renamed to Rosa Bassett in her honour, an idea that had first been proposed in 1926.

=== Amalgamation ===
With the abolition of the Tripartite System the Inner London Education Authority took the decision to move to a fully Comprehensive System of education, meaning significant changes for grammar schools such as Rosa Bassett.

In the case of Rosa Bassett the change to comprehensive status was achieved in 1977 by amalgamating it with Battersea Grammar School, a school for boys, to create Furzedown Secondary School. The majority of the teaching staff transferred to the new comprehensive school, which incorporated the buildings of Rosa Bassett into an enlarged site. Today the former Rosa Bassett School buildings are part of Graveney School.

== Headmistresses ==
- 1906–1925 Miss Rosa Bassett, MBE, BA (1871–1925)
- 1926–1947 Miss Muriel Davies, MA (d. 1980)
- 1947–1963 Miss Laura C. Jewill Hill, MA (Oxon) (1907–2004)
- 1963–1977 Miss Kathleen Shores Dougill, BSc (d. 2013).

== Motto ==
The school's original motto was "Steadiness, Sincerity and Service", but this was changed to Honesta Obtinete (literally: "Possess Virtues!") while the school was still at Stockwell. The Latin was normally translated as "Hold Fast [To] That Which Is Good", taken from 1 Thessalonians 5:21, Authorised Version.

== Notable pupils ==
Former pupils include:

- Anna Livia Julian Brawn (Anna Livia), writer
- Rosemary Brown, medium
- Cynthia Cooke, Matron-in-Chief, Queen Alexandra's Royal Naval Nursing Service, 1973–1976
- Baroness Park of Monmouth, diplomat
- Penelope Wensley, AO, Australian diplomat, 25th Governor of Queensland,
- Carolyn Steedman, historian
