= Rosa Bassett =

- Born: 9 August 1871; Deptford, London
- Died: 19 December 1925 (aged 54); London Borough of Wandsworth
- Occupation: Headmistress
- Known for: Educationist

Rosa Bassett, MBE, BA (9 August 1871 – 19 December 1925) was an English educationalist and headmistress of Stockwell Secondary School. After a relocation from Stockwell the school's name was changed to County Secondary School, Streatham. Located in Welham Road, London, it was later renamed Rosa Bassett School in her memory and honour.

Rosa Bassett was instrumental in the first application of the Dalton Plan of teaching within an English secondary school. She contributed a chapter to Helen Parkhurst's book on the Plan, as well as writing the introduction to a book of Dalton Plan class assignments prepared by the staff within her school.

== Early life ==
Rosa Bassett was born in Deptford, London, the daughter of an engineer's clerk. She was successful academically and graduated as a BA of London University with a First Class Degree in 1902, and gained the Certificat de l'Universite de Rennes in 1905. In the same year, Miss Bassett became the Senior Mistress at Kingsland Secondary School (later known as Dalston Secondary School) in north London, at which she was seen to be a great success, and in 1906 she was made headmistress of the new Stockwell Secondary School for Girls.

== Headmistress of the County Secondary School, Streatham ==
The school at Stockwell prospered and, in 1913, it transferred to a new site between Streatham and Tooting, becoming the County Secondary School, Streatham. Under Bassett's continued leadership the school was a success, and by 1917 was noted for its academic achievement and encouraging self-reliance and responsibility amongst its pupils.

The First World War saw Bassett's organisational skill put to good use when she was invited to help set up the processes for the recruitment and testing of new female staff at the War Office and later other parts of the Civil Service. Under her leadership (as Chairman of a Committee of headmistresses who devised such plans for government posts), hundreds of candidates were chosen from the applicants, given written examinations, interviewed and appointed. It was her work in this area that led to her receiving the honour of MBE in 1917.

The Order of the British Empire was founded in 1917 to recognise the services of people who had served the country in notable ways. Miss Bassett received the Order on 27 September from King George V and Queen Mary. Girls and staff commemorated the occasion by presenting their headmistress with a plaque.

In 1918 when the Government introduced food rationing, Miss Bassett was asked to be responsible for the distribution of ration cards over a large area of Tooting. She formed a Committee of the Staff and senior girls, who were characteristically given an opportunity to join in this responsible work.

== The Dalton Plan ==
On 27 May 1920 an article on the Dalton Plan by Belle Rennie was published in the Times Educational Supplement, introducing the ideas of Helen Parkhurst to a British audience. Parkhurst's view that education should move away from traditional, rigid, class-based teaching and allow teaching to be adjusted to the pace of each individual child clearly aligned with those of Bassett, as within a month Bassett had started a small-scale trial using the Plan at the school with a group of pupils who had already completed their university entrance examinations. The results were deemed a success, and the full-scale use of the Plan within the County Secondary School, Streatham was phased in over the 1920–1921 academic year.

Rosa Bassett's support of the Dalton Plan was considerable, and she wrote an article about the school's introduction of the Plan for The Times, which was reprinted as a chapter within Parkhurst's book. Bassett supported Parkhust's visit to England in 1921 by opening the school to visitors who wished to see the Plan in practice. A two-volume set of Dalton Plan assignments covering English, Geography, History, Mathematics and Science, prepared by the staff of the school with an introduction by Bassett, was published in 1922.

In 1921 Bassett was given leave of absence from the school so that she could visit America to see the operation of the Dalton Plan there. She also lectured in New York on the experience learned while introducing the Plan in England, donating her fees to the Dalton Association to support further visits of teachers to America.

In 1922, Miss Parkhurst published 'Education on the Dalton Plan' to which Miss Bassett contributed a chapter "A Year's Experiment in an English Secondary School."

== Death of Miss Bassett ==
"In 1924, School Inspectors noted that Miss Bassett was badly overworked. Miss Bassett had not been in good health for more than a year and was unable to travel round the country as she had done, lecturing on the Dalton Plan. One cold morning in December 1925, Miss Bassett slipped on the icy road just after leaving home for school and broke her leg. She was taken to the South London hospital for Women. Her death on Saturday, 19 December, was hastened, but not caused by, her accident. A Memorial Service was held at St. leonards Church, Streatham at Noon on 23 December with her funeral at Brockley."

On the same day, a correspondent wrote to the Times. "The untimely death of Miss Rosa Bassett is a severe loss, not only to London Education, but to teachers in all parts of the world, to whom her advice and aid were given without stint. She will be gratefully remembered by thousands of teachers to whom during the last five years she had elucidated and explained the working of the Dalton Plan, with which hundreds of English schools have since successfully experimented."

In "The Triumph of the Dalton Plan" published by C. W. Kimmins and Belle Rennie in 1932, the authors wrote: "to the labours of Miss Bassett, the Dalton Plan in England owes an incalculable debt. Her tall and commanding figure became well known on lecture platforms and her general air of balance, judgment and grave kindliness gave to all she said conviction and weight. No audience could look at or hear Miss Bassett and believe that she could possibly be the victim of an educational freak or fad. To this fundamental basis of good sense and stability, as well as to the wisdom of what she said, much of her success as a propagandist was due.

To the outside world she gave herself ungrudgingly, in the firm belief that in spreading knowledge of the value of the Dalton Plan, she was definitely aiding the progress of evolution in education. Her death in 1925 was a great loss, not only to the school which she so ably controlled, but to Dalton enthusiasts in all parts of the globe."

== Rosa Bassett's legacy ==
After Rosa Bassett's career was cut short by her death, the school continued to apply many of the principles of the Plan in the years that followed. The County Secondary School, Streatham was renamed Rosa Bassett School in 1951, in honour of its first headmistress.

On the school badge, the initials R.B.S. replaced S.S.S (which were the initials of first Stockwell and then Streatham Secondary School, & which had also stood for "Steady, Straight, Sincere"). It was at Stockwell that the school motto was adopted. One of the Board of Education Inspectors, who was keenly interested in the work of the school, translated Miss Bassett's favourite words from St. Paul's letter to the Thessalonians, "Hold fast that which is good" as Honesta Obtinete.

It was always Miss Bassett's way to let the girls speak for themselves, and perhaps, the best indication of what the school meant to her pupils is given in the words of one of them. Sylvia G. Kastell (née Greenfield), who attended RBS 1916–1919, wrote: -

"When I ask myself the question, 'What did school do for me?' I find that three things stand out. First it gave me everlasting belief in the value of freedom, freedom to work alone and freedom to organise things for oneself. Secondly I learnt the importance of playing one's part in the community, to be a citizen of the world as well as a citizen of the school. I developed a firm conviction that it is those that put most into school life, who contribute most, who get most fun out of it. Most important of all, I left school with an absolute belief that I could surmount mountains, provided I really wanted to, and worked hard enough."

In the early years of the twentieth century, many people thought teaching should be reformed, and were influenced by the ideas expressed by writers like Edmond Holmes in his book, "What Is and What Might Be" (1911). Miss Bassett was one of these educational pioneers, at least fifty years in advance of her time.

It has been reported that Miss Bassett was regarded as effective in her relationships with pupils, parents, and staff. A former member of staff at Streatham later described her as a highly capable headmistress.
