= Royal Naval Hospital, Herne Bay =

The Royal Naval Hospital, Herne Bay was a Royal Naval Hospital based at Herne Bay (now Riverwood), near Sydney, Australia. The hospital was used chiefly in Second World War, and a young Cynthia Cooke served there in 1944–45.

In mid-September 1945, the hospital provided equipment to HMS Glory in order to set up a medical facility in the hangar, along with thirty-six medical staff from the Voluntary Aid Detachment and Queen Alexandra's Royal Naval Nursing Service.

Thirty-six deaths occurred at Herne Bay in the period 1945–46.
