= John St John, 2nd Viscount St John =

British politician (1702–1748)

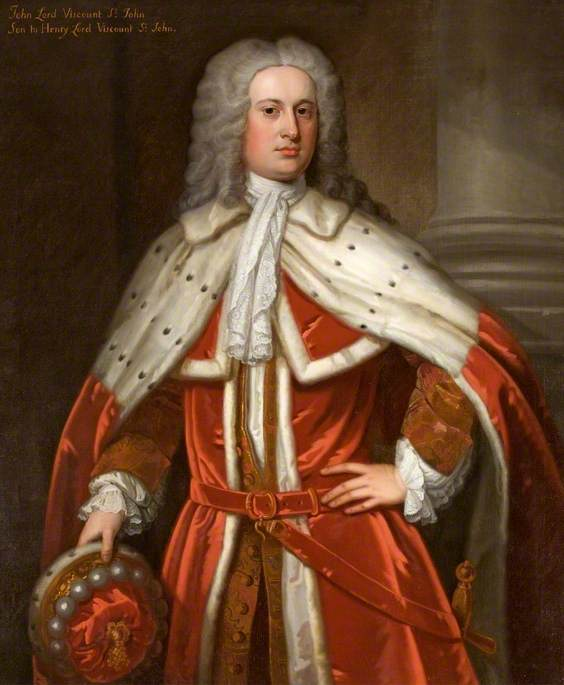
Portrait of St John by William Aikman

John St John, 2nd Viscount St John (3 May 1702 – November 1748) was a British politician who represented Wootton Bassett in the House of Commons of Great Britain from 1727 to 1734.

St John was the second surviving son of Henry St John, 1st Viscount St John MP, and his second wife Angelica Magdalena Wharton, widow of Phillip Wharton and daughter of Claude Pelissary, treasurer-general of the navy to Louis XIV of France. When John St. John was a child his elder half-brother, Bolingbroke, was attainted and excluded by special remainder from succeeding to the peerage. St John was educated at Eton College in 1717 and was sent to Paris in 1720 to complete his education under Bolingbroke's care. In 1721 his father invested £4,000 to acquire the reversion of a customs sinecure worth £1,200 a year for the lives of his two younger sons, John and Holles. St John married Anne Furnese, daughter of Sir Robert Furnese, 2nd Baronet of Waldershare, Kent on 17 April 1729,

At the 1727 British general election after coming of age, St John was returned as Member of Parliament for Wootton Bassett on the family interest. He voted with the Opposition except on the repeal of the Septennial Act in 1734. He did not stand again at the 1734 British general election. St John was appointed Comptroller of customs in London in April 1740 holding the post for life.

On his father's death on 8 April 1742, he succeeded not only to the title under special remainder as 2nd Viscount St. John but to Lydiard Park. St. John's wife Anne died on 14 July 1747. St John married as his second wife Hester Clarke, daughter of James Clarke of Wharton, Herefordshire on 19 June 1748. St. John died abroad in November 1748, leaving three sons and three daughters.

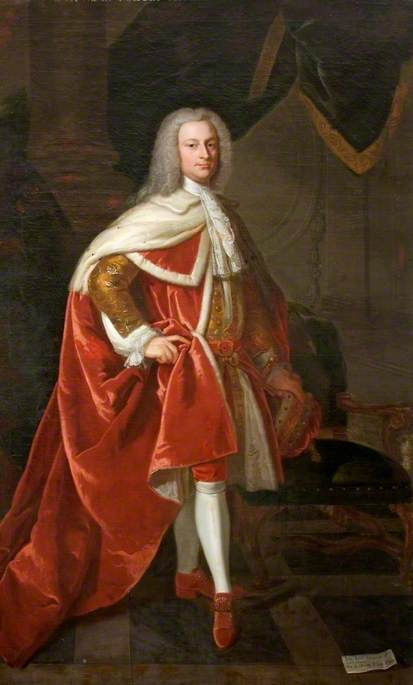
John St John (1702–1748), painting attributed to Joseph Highmore, 1745

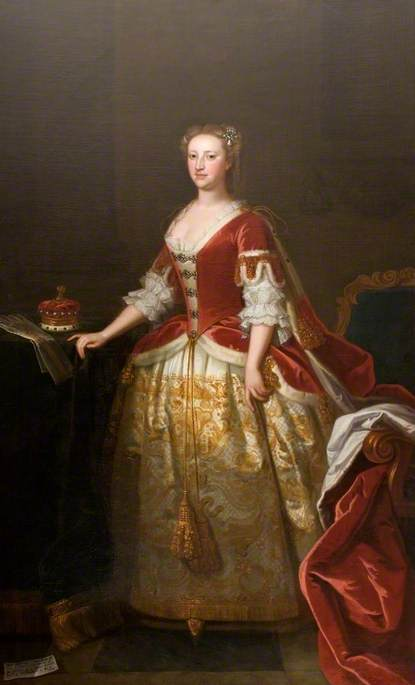
Anne Furnese (1711–1747), painting attributed to Joseph Highmore, 1745

Parliament of Great Britain
Preceded by Colonel Robert Murray; William Chetwynd	Member of Parliament for Wootton Bassett; 1727–1734; With: John Crosse	Succeeded by Sir Robert Long; Captain Nicholas Robinson
Peerage of Great Britain
Preceded by Henry St John	Viscount St John; 1742–1748	Succeeded by Frederick St John
