= Ensham School =

Location
- Franciscan Road; Tooting, London, SW17 8HE; England; 51.426°N 0.163°W

Information
- Type: Comprehensive
- Established: c. 1905
- Closed: 1986
- Local authority: ILEA
- Gender: Girls
- Age: 11 to 18

Ensham School was a girls' comprehensive school in Tooting, South London. During the 1930s, it was a mixed central school. By the 1950s, it had become a girls' secondary modern school. It was later made a comprehensive school.

The school closed when it was amalgamated in 1986 with Furzedown Secondary School, a mixed comprehensive school, to create the new Graveney School on the former Furzedown Secondary School site.

== History ==
Ensham School was constructed during the period of expansion of Tooting at turn of the 20th century.

By the 1930s, it was known as Ensham Central (Mixed) School. In the late 1950s, the school was called Ensham County Secondary School. It later became Ensham Secondary School.

In the 1930s, the school was a mixed central school, becoming a girls' secondary modern school by the 1950s and a girls' comprehensive school by the early 1960s.

In 1986, Ensham was amalgamated with Furzedown Secondary School, a mixed comprehensive school, to create the new Graveney School. Initially the school operated in both the former Ensham and Furzedown buildings, but eventually the Ensham site was closed.

== Notable former pupils ==
- Jean Scrivens, 100m runner, won the silver in the 4x100m relay at the 1956 Melbourne Olympics
