= Furzedown Secondary School =

Location
- Welham Road; Streatham, London, SW17 9BU; England; 51.4235°N 0.151°W

Information
- Type: Comprehensive
- Established: 1977
- Closed: 1986
- Local authority: ILEA
- Headmaster: John A. Phillips, BA (Oxon)
- Staff: c. 100
- Gender: Mixed
- Age: 11 to 18
- Enrolment: c. 1450
- Badge: Gold falcon rising with scarlet pimpernel

Furzedown Secondary School was a mixed comprehensive school in South London. It was established in Welham Road on the boundary between Streatham and Tooting in 1977, following the amalgamation of Battersea Grammar boys' school and Rosa Bassett girls' grammar school.

The school closed when it was amalgamated with Ensham School, a comprehensive school for girls, in 1986 to create the new Graveney School, an enlarged mixed comprehensive school which incorporated the Furzedown Secondary School site.

== History ==
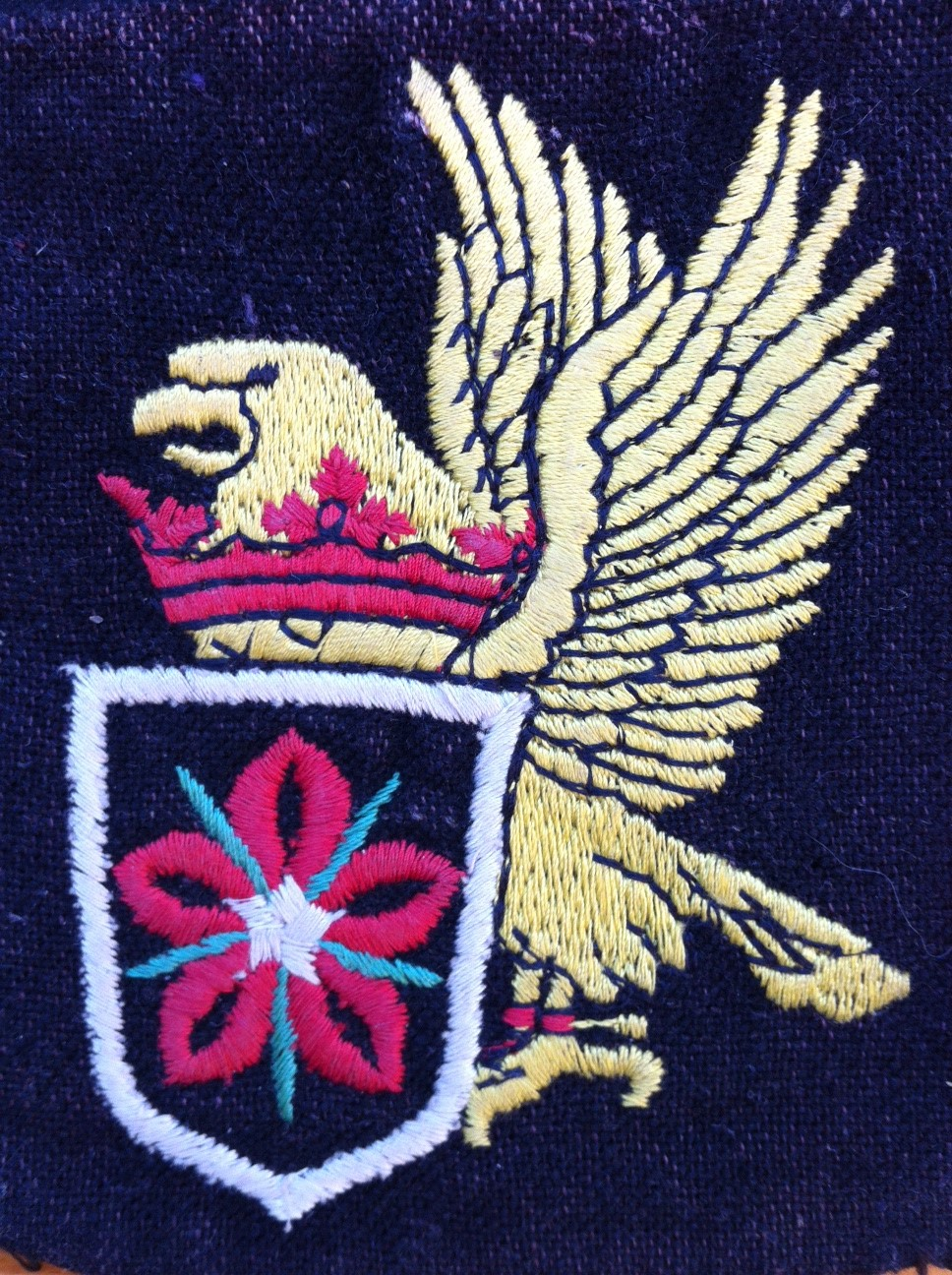
Furzedown Secondary School Badge

Furzedown was formed following the amalgamation of Battersea Grammar School and Rosa Bassett School in 1977. Neither school's site was sufficient to house the combined school, however Furzedown took over many of the buildings of the Furzedown Training College (a teacher training college) which were located opposite the Rosa Bassett buildings on Welham Road.

The combined former Rosa Bassett and Furzedown College buildings offered sufficient accommodation for the whole school, and the former Battersea Grammar site at Abbotswood Road, Streatham, was soon closed following the amalgamation. The playing fields at Abbotswood Road continued to be used by the new school.

Although physically adjacent, the school was split across the two Welham Road sites, with the younger pupils from the first two years (ages 11–13) on the former Rosa Bassett site to the south and the older pupils in the upper-school on the northern side of the road. This split could not be maintained for all lessons and this resulted in a considerable movement of pupils between the two sites throughout the day. At that time Welham Road was fairly heavily trafficked and a near-fatal accident in c. 1980, followed by protests from parents and children, prompted the closure of the road to through-traffic.

During the 1983–84 academic year, the ILEA announced plans for the amalgamation of the school with Ensham School, a nearby girls' school, along with the intention of removing the school's sixth form. Despite protests by parents and staff the first part of this plan went ahead in 1986, and the new Graveney School was created. Graveney initially operated at both the former Furzedown and Ensham school sites, but eventually consolidated on the Welham Road buildings.

== Headmaster ==
- 1977–1986 John A. Phillips, BA (Oxon)

John Phillips had been the headmaster of Battersea Grammar School from 1973 and became the new headteacher of Graveney School in 1986, remaining there until 1989.
