= Cynthia Cooke =

British military nurse

Matron-in-Chief Cynthia Cooke CBE RRC CStJ
- Born: 11 June 1919; Bealings, Suffolk, England
- Died: 20 April 2016 (aged 96)
- Military career
- Allegiance: United Kingdom
- Branch: Royal Navy
- Service years: 1943–1976
- Rank: Matron-in-Chief
- Commands: Queen Alexandra's Royal Naval Nursing Service (1973–76)
- Conflicts: Second World War
- Awards: Commander of the Order of the British Empire; Royal Red Cross; Commander of the Order of St John

Cynthia Felicity Joan Cooke, CBE, RRC, CStJ (11 June 1919 – 20 April 2016) was a British military nurse and nursing administrator who served as Matron-in-Chief of the Queen Alexandra's Royal Naval Nursing Service, the nursing branch of the Her Majesty's Naval Service, from 1973 to 1976.

Cooke was awarded the Royal Red Cross in 1969, became a Commander of the Order of St John in 1974 and a Commander of the Order of the British Empire in 1975.

== Early life ==
Cooke was born on 11 June 1919 in Bealings, Suffolk. She was the daughter of a Guardsman, and went to school at Stockwell County Secondary School in London, where a special teaching method known as the Dalton Plan had been put into place.

== Nursing career ==
In 1938, she began her medical training at Tite Street Children's Hospital, in Chelsea. After the Second World War broke out, she worked as a theatre assistant and, in 1943, began her training to join the Queen Alexandra's Royal Naval Nursing Service (QARNNS) at Royal Naval Hospital, Haslar. She worked there until 1944, and before the Normandy landings she recalled cycling to the hospital past columns of Canadian tanks, to calls of "Hello sugar! Are you rationed?" from the male soldiers. By the end of 1944, she had transferred to Australia, travelling there on a troopship with 4,000 Royal Marines.

In 1945, Cooke volunteered to move from her nursing post at Royal Naval Hospital, Herne Bay, in Sydney, to assist the medical team aboard HMS Formidable. The ship's first mission was to collect 1,000 Australian former prisoners of war from Manila. The embarkation alone took three days, and Cooke spent some of her time assisting in the creation of a body-length plaster case, complete with stretcher poles, to move a man who was suffering from spinal tuberculosis.

Shortly afterwards, on 24 October, the ship sailed for Papua New Guinea to assist 1,254 Punjabi soldiers suffering from malaria and eczema. Cooke warned the soldiers that the methylated spirits used to clean ulcers would hurt; her words were translated as "If doesn't hurt, it doesn't do any good." Rev H. Kennen, who was also aboard Formidable, recalled that during the ship's line-crossing ceremony Cooke "did fail to perform the deep and graceful traditional curtsy due, thereby insulting the First Lord of the Admiralty", and was punished "as a point of principle" with "ducking in an improvised pool". After her work aboard Formidable, she transferred to HMS Queen to travel back to United Kingdom.

After the war, Cooke served at RNAS Dale (HMS Goldcrest), with a young David Attenborough, who was performing National Service at the time. She was appointed an Associate of the Royal Red Cross in the 1954 New Year Honours, and advanced to a Member of the Royal Red Cross in the 1969 Birthday Honours. She then served in Chatham, Hong Kong, Malta and Plymouth, before becoming the lead tutor at the Royal Navy training school in 1970, and finally becoming Matron-in-Chief of the QARNNS in 1973. She was appointed a Commander of the Order of St John in 1974, and a Commander of the Order of the British Empire in the 1975 Birthday Honours.

== Later life ==
Cooke retired in 1976, and spent the rest of her life caring for her mother and supporting the Royal British Legion for Women, the National Blood Service, and her local church. She died on 20 April 2016, aged 96.
