= Johanna St John =

British herbalist

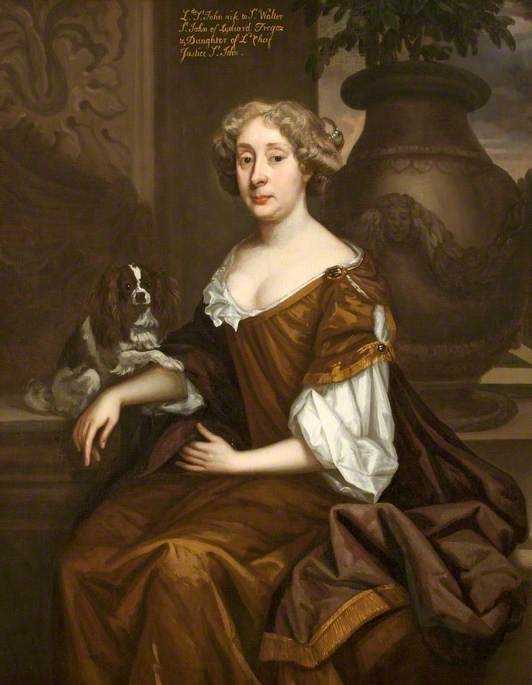
- Portrait of Johanna St John, by Godfrey Kneller
- Born: 1631
- Died: 1705 (aged 73–74)
- Spouse: Sir Walter St John, 3rd Baronet
- Children: 13, including Henry
- Parents: Oliver St John (father); Johanna Altham (mother)

Johanna St John (1631–1705) was an English gardener and herbalist, and the eldest daughter of a notable Parliamentarian, Oliver St John. She married Sir Walter St John, a distant relative. St John constructed two recipe books containing culinary, cosmetic, and medicinal recipes. She was the grandmother to the first Viscount Bolingbroke, Henry St John.

== Early life ==
St John's father was Oliver St John, a leading Parliamentarian and supporter of Oliver Cromwell. She was raised during the time of the English Civil War. In the early months of her life, her mother, Johanna Altham, brought her to the home of Altham's stepfather, Sir William Masham, in High Laver, Essex. St John was baptized there on 27 January 1631.

In 1649, she married her distant cousin and later had thirteen children.

== Housewife of Lydiard House ==
Lydiard Park is a 260-acre country park at Lydiard Tregoze, nearly four miles west of central Swindon, Wiltshire, England, later owned by the Viscount of Bolingbroke, Johanna St John's grandson. A set of letters between Johanna St John and her steward, Thomas Hardyman, give insight into how she learned to construct her recipe books. At her summer estate, Lydiard House, she found a plethora of materials and ingredients including food, herbs, and livestock as the raw materials needed to craft her recipe books. St John's usage of these materials ranged from food to distilled medicines. From the letters, there is an understanding that Johanna herself did not concoct the recipes at Lydiard House, but gave "exact details to a team of distillers and herbgatherers", often collaborating with other recipe-makers in London. People she collaborated with included Sir Edward Spencer, Lady Manchester, and Lady Peterborough who all had remedies for sore eyes, and Sr. Philip Warwick who had a remedy for cramps.

== Selected recipes ==
=== Banister's powder ===
Banister's powder does not have a clear intended purpose or use. However, the first three ingredients – unicorn horn, bezoar stone, and bones of stag heart – indicate that the intended use was to treat poison. This recipe is significant as an example of the role of magic in remedies during the early modern period.

=== To Make Hands White ===
While many of St John's recipes were prepared to cure ailments, some were meant to be cosmetic. In her recipe "To Make Hands White", she used a concoction of herbs and seeds to cleanse her hands and make them white. This was important to a woman of status who hosted parties, as pallor was associated with wealth and the privilege of remaining idle.
