= Oliver St John =

English judge and politician (1598–1673)

Sir Oliver St John
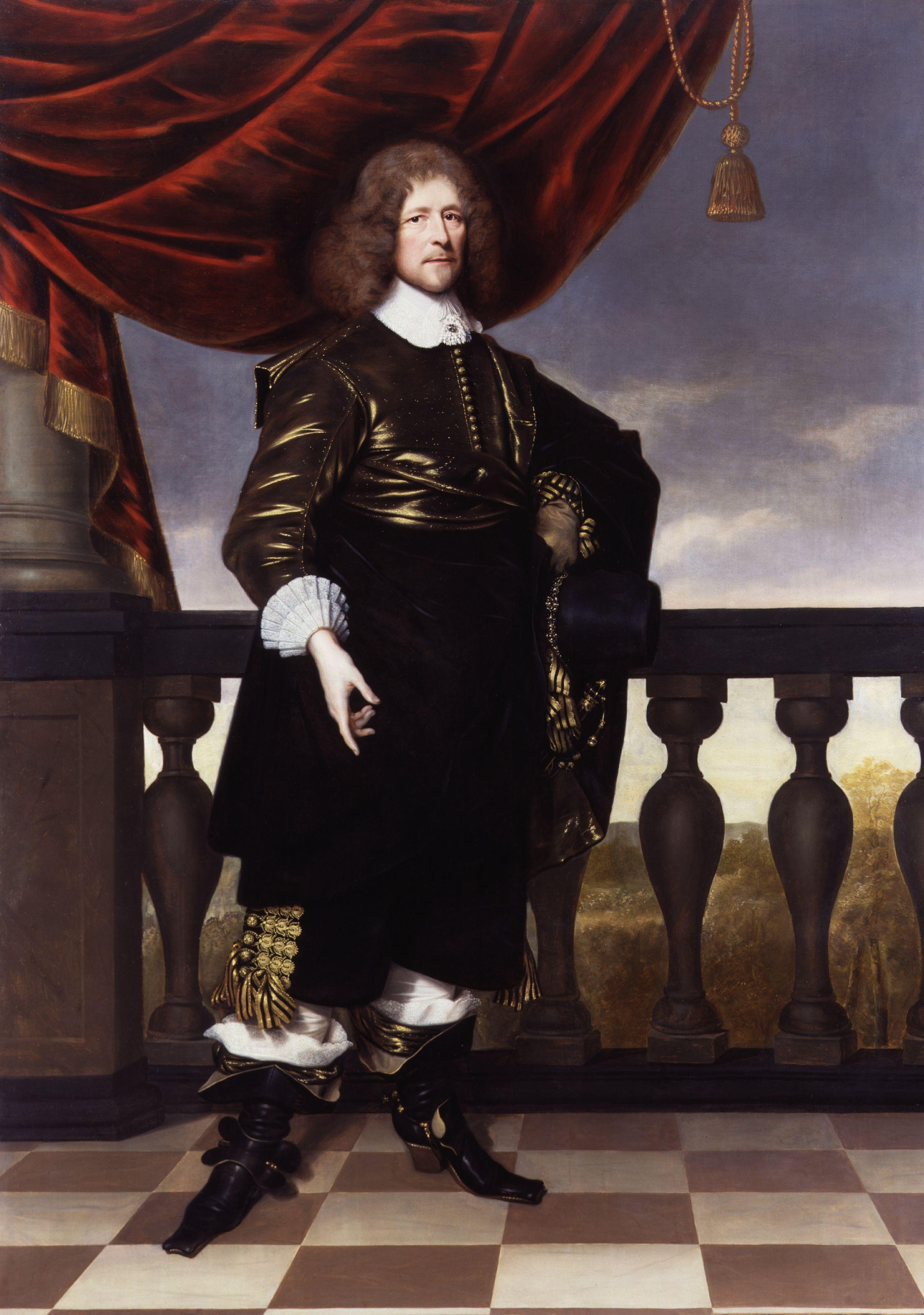
- Portrait by Pieter Nason

Chief Justice of the Common Pleas
- In office 1648–1660
- Preceded by: John Bankes
- Succeeded by: Sir Orlando Bridgeman, 1st Bt

Solicitor General
- In office 1641–1648
- Preceded by: Edward Herbert
- Succeeded by: Thomas Gardiner

Member of Parliament for Totnes
- In office 1640–1653 Serving with John Maynard

Personal details
- Born: c. 1598
- Died: 1673
- Spouse(s): Johanna Altham, Elizabeth Cromwell

Sir Oliver St John (/ˈsɪndʒən/; c. 1598 – 31 December 1673) was an English barrister, judge and politician who sat in the House of Commons from 1640-53. He supported the Parliamentary cause in the English Civil War.

== Early life ==
St John was the son of Oliver St John (of Cayshoe) and his wife Sarah Bulkeley, daughter of Edward Bulkeley of Odell, Bedfordshire and sister of Peter Bulkeley. St John's sister, Elizabeth St John (1605-1677), married Reverend Samuel Whiting (1597-1679) and emigrated to the Massachusetts Bay Colony in Boston in 1636. St John's uncle, Reverend Peter Bulkeley (1583-1689), was also an influential Puritan who left England to live in Massachusetts Bay Colony having fallen out in 1633 with King Charles I, primarily over the King's reissuing of the Declaration of Sports.

St John was one of the leaders of the Parliamentary opposition to King Charles I of England.

St John was at Cambridge University with his brother-in-law the Rev. Samuel Whiting, matriculating from Queens' College, Cambridge at Lent 1616. He was then admitted at Lincoln's Inn on 22 April 1619. He was called to the bar in 1626. St John appears to have got into trouble with the court in connection with a seditious publication, and to have associated himself with the future popular leaders John Pym and Lord Saye. In 1638 he defended John Hampden, along with co-counsel Robert Holborne, on his refusal to pay Ship Money, on which occasion he made a notable speech which established him as a leading advocate. In the same year, he married as his second wife, Elizabeth Cromwell, a first cousin of Oliver Cromwell, to whom his first wife also had been distantly related. The marriage led to an intimate friendship with Cromwell.

== Political career ==
In April 1640, St John was elected Member of Parliament for Totnes in the Short Parliament. He was re-elected MP for Totnes for the Long Parliament in November 1640. He acted in close alliance with Hampden and Pym, especially in opposition to the impost of Ship Money. In 1641, with a view to securing his support, the king appointed St John solicitor-general. This did not prevent him from taking an active role in the impeachment of Thomas Wentworth, 1st Earl of Strafford, and in preparing the bills brought forward by the popular party in the House of Commons. As a result, he was dismissed from the office of Solicitor General in 1643. He defended the decision to proceed against Strafford by way of attainder on the simple ground that there are people who are too dangerous to be given the benefit of the law; he told the Commons: "it was never accounted cruelty or foul play for foxes and wolves to be knocked on the head." Edward Hyde, 1st Earl of Clarendon, although he may have voted in favour of the attainder, later denounced St. John's speech as perhaps the most barbarous and inhumane ever made in the House of Commons.

On the outbreak of the Civil War, St John became recognised as one of the parliamentary leaders. In the quarrel between the parliament and the army in 1647 he sided with the latter, and was not excluded under Pride's Purge in 1649. Throughout this period he enjoyed Cromwell's confidence. Apart from Cromwell, he had few close friends: his manner was described as cold and forbidding, and he had little patience with those he regarded as less gifted than himself.

== Judicial and other activities ==
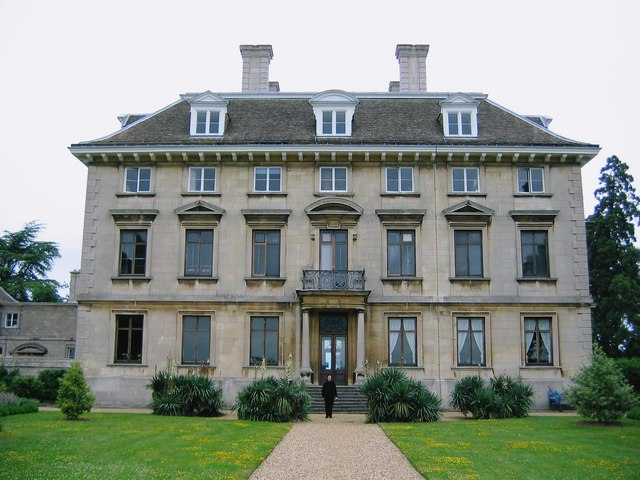
Thorpe Hall, Peterborough

In 1648 St John was appointed Chief Justice of the Common Pleas and from then on he devoted himself to his judicial duties. He refused to act as one of the commissioners for the trial of King Charles I, and had no hand in the constitution of the Commonwealth. In 1651 he went to The Hague, where he led the mission (alongside Walter Strickland, with John Thurloe acting as his secretary) to negotiate a political union between England and the Dutch Republic. The mission failed entirely, leading to the First Anglo-Dutch War. In the same year he successfully conducted a similar negotiation with Scotland, after the Tender of Union. He became Chancellor of Cambridge University in 1651 and retained the post until 1660.

St John built Thorpe Hall at Longthorpe in Peterborough between 1653 and 1656. He was a member of the Council of State from 1659 to 1660.

== Apologia and exile ==
After the Restoration St John petitioned unsuccessfully to retain his office as Lord Chief Justice. He published an account of his past conduct (The Case of Oliver St John, 1660), and this apologia enabled him to escape any retribution worse than exclusion from public office. He retired to his country house in Northamptonshire until 1662, when he left England and went to Basel, Switzerland and afterwards to Augsburg, Germany.

== Family ==
St John married firstly Johanna Altham, only daughter of Sir John Altham of Latton, Essex, and by her had two sons and two daughters. In 1638 he married Elizabeth, daughter of Henry Cromwell (c.1566-1630) and a first cousin of Oliver Cromwell, with whom he had two children. After her death he married, in 1645, Elizabeth Oxenbridge, daughter of Daniel Oxenbridge. His son Francis was MP for Peterborough. His daughter Johanna married Sir Walter St John of Lydiard Tregoze and was the grandmother of Viscount Bolingbroke. His third daughter, Elizabeth, married Sir John Bernard, 2nd Baronet and their daughter Johanna Bernard married Richard Bentley.

St John belonged to the senior branch of an ancient family. There were two branches: the St Johns of Bletsoe in Bedfordshire, and the St Johns of Lydiard Tregoze in Wiltshire, both descendants of the St Johns of Stanton St John in Oxfordshire.

A distant cousin of the 4th Baron who was created Earl of Bolingbroke in 1624, Oliver took an active part on the parliamentary side of the English Civil War, his son, the 5th Baron St. John killed at the Battle of Edgehill. Oliver was a distant cousin of the King through Margaret Beauchamp of Bletso, grandmother of Henry VII, whose first husband was Sir Oliver St. John of Lydiard Tregoze (died 1437).

== Fictional portrayals ==
Oliver St John plays a minor role in Traitor's Field by Robert Wilton, published in May 2013 by Corvus, an imprint of Atlantic Books.

Parliament of England
Parliament suspended since 1629	Member of Parliament for Totnes; 1640–1653; With: John Maynard	Not represented in Barebones Parliament
Legal offices
Preceded by Sir John Bankes	Chief Justice of the Common Pleas; 1660–1667	Succeeded by Sir Ordlando Bridgeman
