= Sir Walter St John, 3rd Baronet =

English politician

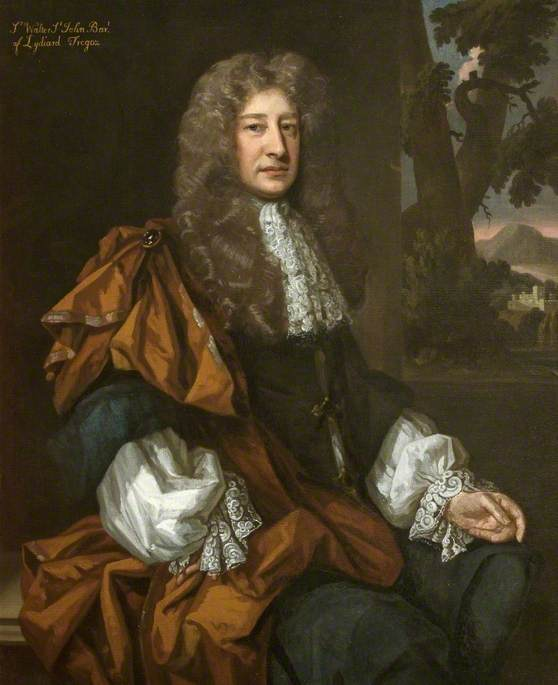
- Portrait of St John by Godfrey Kneller

Personal details
- Born: May 1622
- Died: July 1708 (aged 86)
- Spouse: Johanna St John
- Children: 13, including Henry
- Parents: Johanna St John (father); Anne Leighton (mother)

Sir Walter St John, 3rd Baronet (May 1622 – 3 July 1708) was an English politician.

== Biography ==
He was the sixth son of Sir John St John, 1st Baronet of Lydiard Tregoze and inherited the baronetcy on the death of his nephew Sir John St John, 2nd Baronet (c. 1637–1657), the son and heir of Oliver, the son and heir apparent of Sir John, 1st Baronet.

In 1656, Sir Walter was Member of Parliament for Wiltshire (1656–1658 and 1659); for Wootton Bassett (1660–1679); and again for Wiltshire (1679–1681 and 1690–1695). He was famed for "piety and moral virtues".

In 1700, Sir Walter signed a trust deed that led to the formation of a school which later became the Sir Walter St John's School of Battersea.

Sir Walter died in his 87th year on 3 July 1708, and was buried on 9 July at Battersea. On his death the baronetcy passed to his son Henry St John who was created a viscount in 1716.

== Family ==
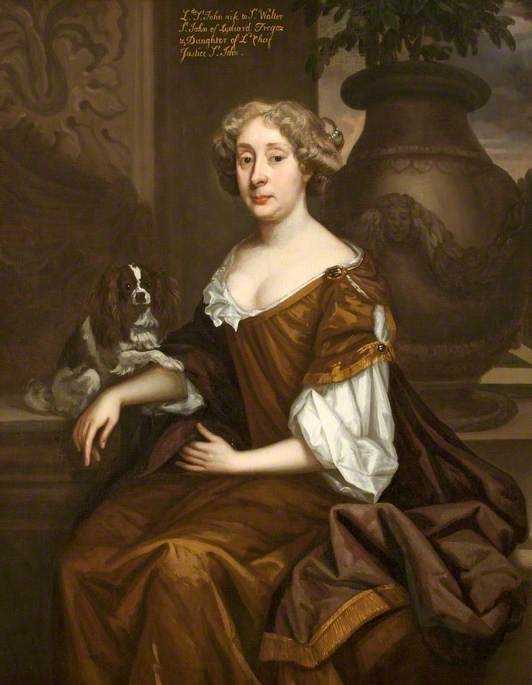
Walter St John married Johanna St John (pictured), with whom he had thirteen children.

Sir Walter married, in or before 1651, Johanna a daughter of Oliver St John, of Longthorpe county Northampton, Lord Chief Justice of the Common Pleas (1648–1660) and his first wife Johanna daughter and heir of Sir James Altham. Johanna died three years before Sir Walter. They had thirteen children, but seven of them did not survive to adulthood. His daughter, Anne St. John, married Thomas Cholmondeley, twice MP for Cheshire.

== Notes ==
Parliament of England
Preceded by Ten members	Member of Parliament for Wiltshire; 1656–1659; With: nine others 1656–1658; Sir Anthony Ashley Cooper 1659	Succeeded by Sir Anthony Ashley Cooper; Sir John Ernle
Preceded by John Pleydell; Sir Baynham Throckmorton	Member of Parliament for Wootton Bassett; 1661–1679; With: John Pleydell	Succeeded by John Pleydell; Laurence Hyde
Preceded by Thomas Thynne; Sir Richard Howe	Member of Parliament for Wiltshire; 1679–1685; With: Thomas Thynne	Succeeded by Viscount Cornbury; Viscount Bruce
Preceded by Sir Thomas Mompesson; Viscount Cornbury	Member of Parliament for Wiltshire; 1690–1695; With: Viscount Cornbury	Succeeded by Henry St John; Sir George Hungerford
Baronetage of England
Preceded by John St John	Baronet (of Lydiard Tregoze); 1656–1708	Succeeded by Henry St John
