= Oliver St John, 1st Viscount Grandison =

English soldier and politician

The Viscount Grandison
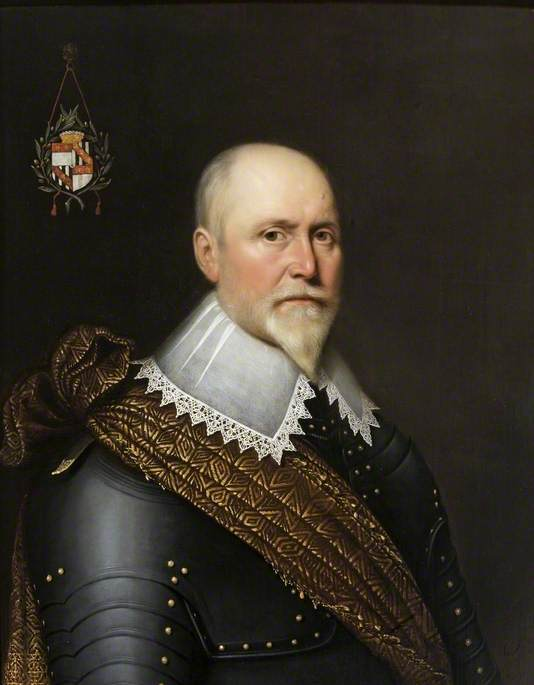
- Oliver St John, 1st Viscount Grandison, 1st Baron Tregoz

Lord Deputy of Ireland
- In office 1616–1622
- Preceded by: The 1st Baron Chichester
- Succeeded by: The 1st Viscount Falkland

Personal details
- Born: Oliver St John; 1559
- Died: 30 December 1630
- Parent: Nicholas St John (father)

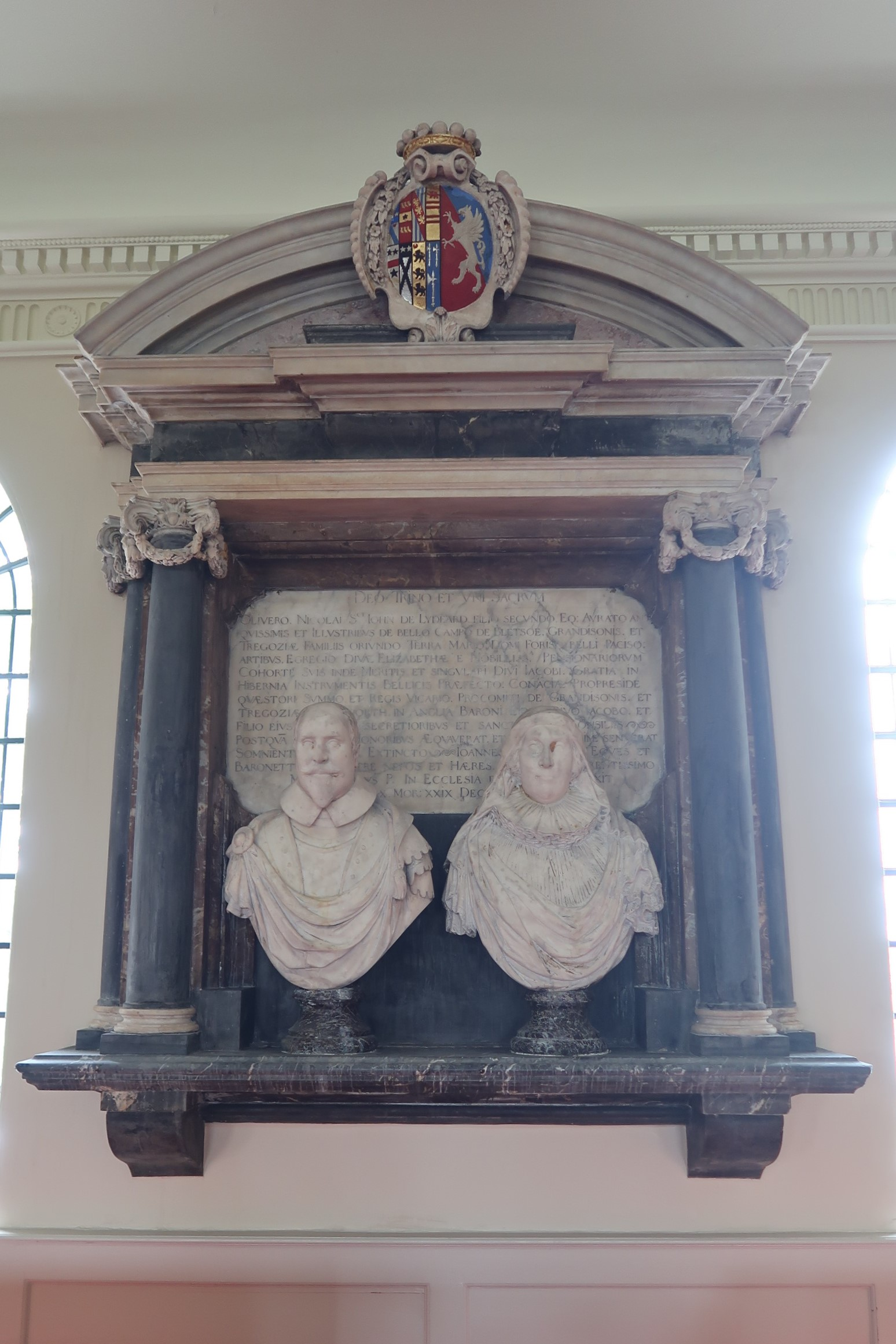
Wall memorial in St Mary's Church, Battersea, London, to the 1st Viscount Grandison and his wife, Joan Holcrofte

Oliver St John, 1st Viscount Grandison (1559 – 30 December 1630), was an English soldier and politician who became Lord Deputy of Ireland.

== Early years ==
He was the second son of Nicholas St John (ca. 1526 – 8 November 1589) of Lydiard Park in Wiltshire and Purley Park in Berkshire, by his wife Elizabeth (bef. 1542 – 1587), daughter of Sir Richard Blount of Mapledurham House in Oxfordshire, and Elizabeth Lister. His mother was distantly related to the 8th Baron Mountjoy, and on his father's side he was descended through a female line from the Grandisons, and was related to the St Johns, Barons of Bletso. He seems to have grown up mostly at Purley, and was educated at Oxford, matriculating from Trinity College on 20 December 1577, and graduating B.A. on 26 June 1578. Knowing that his father, who expected him to make his own way, would leave him very little money, he decided on a career in the law.

In 1580, he was admitted a student of Lincoln's Inn; but about March 1584 he killed the well-known explorer George Best in a duel and was compelled to flee the country. The motive for the duel is unclear, although St John's violent temper no doubt contributed to it: by his own later admission he was "by nature the child of wrath".

== Career ==
St John now sought his fortunes as a soldier abroad, and served in Flanders and in France. Before 1591 he had attained the rank of captain, and in the autumn of that year commanded Essex's horse at the siege of Rouen. In 1592 he returned to England, and was elected member for Cirencester in the parliament summoned to meet on 19 February 1593. In March he was placed on a commission for the relief of maimed soldiers and mariners, and made several speeches during the session; but parliament was dissolved in April, and soon afterwards Essex recommended St John to Robert Cecil as a cavalryman. He again sought service in the Netherlands, and was present at the battle of Nieuport on 2 July 1600.

=== Ireland ===
Tyrone's rebellion took experienced English soldiers to Ireland, and St John accompanied Mountjoy there in February 1601; he was knighted by Mountjoy at Dublin on 28 February, and was given command of two hundred men. During the Spanish intervention in Ireland that year, he took a prominent part in the siege of Kinsale in the autumn, repulsing a night attack of the Spanish on 2 December, when he was wounded. On 13 December he left the camp to carry despatches to Queen Elizabeth. In November 1602 he was back in Ireland commanding twenty-five horse and 150 foot in Connacht, under Sir George Carew, and in the same year, he was recommended by Cecil for the office of vice-president of that province (but the arrangement does not seem to have been carried out). From 1604 to 1607 he sat in the English parliament as member for Portsmouth. On 12 December 1605, he was made master of the ordnance in Ireland, and sworn of the Irish privy council.

From this time St John was Sir Arthur Chichester's most trusted adviser. Early in 1608, he was named a commissioner for the plantation of Ulster. He drew up a scheme for the plantation of the province, and accompanied Chichester in his progress through Ulster in 1609. As an undertaker, he had grants of fifteen hundred acres in Ballymore, County Armagh, and a thousand acres (4 km^{2}) in 'Keernan. He advised that no grants of the lands of the banished Earls should be made, but that they should be let to the native Irish at a high rent. Early in 1609 Chichester sent him to England, and he drew up a report of the commissioners' proceedings for Salisbury's benefit.

=== Member of the Irish Parliament ===
In 1613 he was elected member of the Irish Parliament for County Roscommon, and took an important part in the dispute about the speakership, which descended into pantomime after the rival factions chose Sir John Everard and Sir John Davies. Speaking from his experience of the English House of Commons, St John urged that the first business of the house was to elect a speaker, and that the proper method of voting was to leave the house and be counted in a lobby. Everard's supporters, however, placed Everard in the chair, from which he was only ejected by the majority after Davies, a very fat man, actually sat on him. St John was one of the members sent to lay the matter before James I: as a result Everard was summoned before the Privy Council and briefly imprisoned in the Tower of London, before being sent home with an admonition to keep the peace. In December 1614 St John resigned the mastership of the ordnance; he was in England during October 1615, when the Earl of Somerset was committed to his custody, in connection with the murder of Sir Thomas Overbury.

=== Lord Deputy of Ireland ===
In 1615 he was appointed Vice-Admiral of Connaught for life and confirmed in the position by the 1st Marquess of Buckingham in 1619. He surrendered the position in 1627.

On 2 July 1616, St John was appointed Lord Deputy of Ireland; he received the sword of state on 30 August. His appointment was partly due to his close family connection with the 1st Viscount Villiers, as he then was, by then the prime Royal Favourite who was later created, in 1618, the 1st Marquess of Buckingham and, in 1623, the 1st Duke of Buckingham. St John's administration, like Lord Chichester's, was marked by persecution of recusants. He banished, by proclamation, all monks and friars educated abroad. He also pushed on the colonisation of Ulster, and the plantation of County Longford in 1618 was followed the next year by that of County Leitrim. His severity against the recusants created enemies, and the fact that he owed his appointment to Buckingham (as Viscount Villiers later became) made him unpopular with many of his council. Early in 1621, they urged his recall; and, though James commended him and protested against involving him in disgrace, he was finally commanded to deliver up the sword of state to Lord Chancellor Loftus on 18 April 1622. He left Ireland on 4 May.

St John still remained in favour at court. On 28 June 1622, he was sworn of the English Privy Council, and on 23 June 1623 he was created Viscount Grandison, of Limerick, in the Peerage of Ireland; on 16 August 1625, he was made Lord High Treasurer of Ireland, and on 20 May 1626 was raised to the Peerage of England as Baron Tregoz, of Highworth, Wiltshire.

In 1624, Lord Grandison, as he now was, was placed on the Council of War, and served on other commissions. He also interested himself in foreign and colonial affairs, frequently corresponding with his nephew, Sir Thomas Roe. In 1627, he bought the manors of Wandsworth and Battersea, where he had had a house since 1600. His health failing, he sought the advice of Sir Theodore Turquet de Mayerne. After a visit to Ireland in 1630 to settle his estates there, he returned to Battersea, where he died on 30 December in the same year, being buried there on 12 January 1631.

== Family ==
St John married Joan, daughter and heiress of John Roydon of Battersea, and widow of Sir William Holcroft; she was buried at Battersea on 10 March 1631; by her, he had no issue, but became the step-father to Henry Holcroft. The barony of Tregoz became extinct. Grandison's manors, Wandsworth and Battersea, passed to his nephew Sir John St John. The viscounty of Grandison passed to his nephew, William Villiers, son of Sir Edward Villiers (who was the Duke of Buckingham's half-brother) by his wife Barbara, Grandison's elder sister.

Peerage of Ireland
New creation	Viscount Grandison; 1620–1630	Succeeded by William Villiers
Peerage of England
New creation	Baron Tregoz; 1626–1630	Extinct
