= Exclusion Bill Parliament =

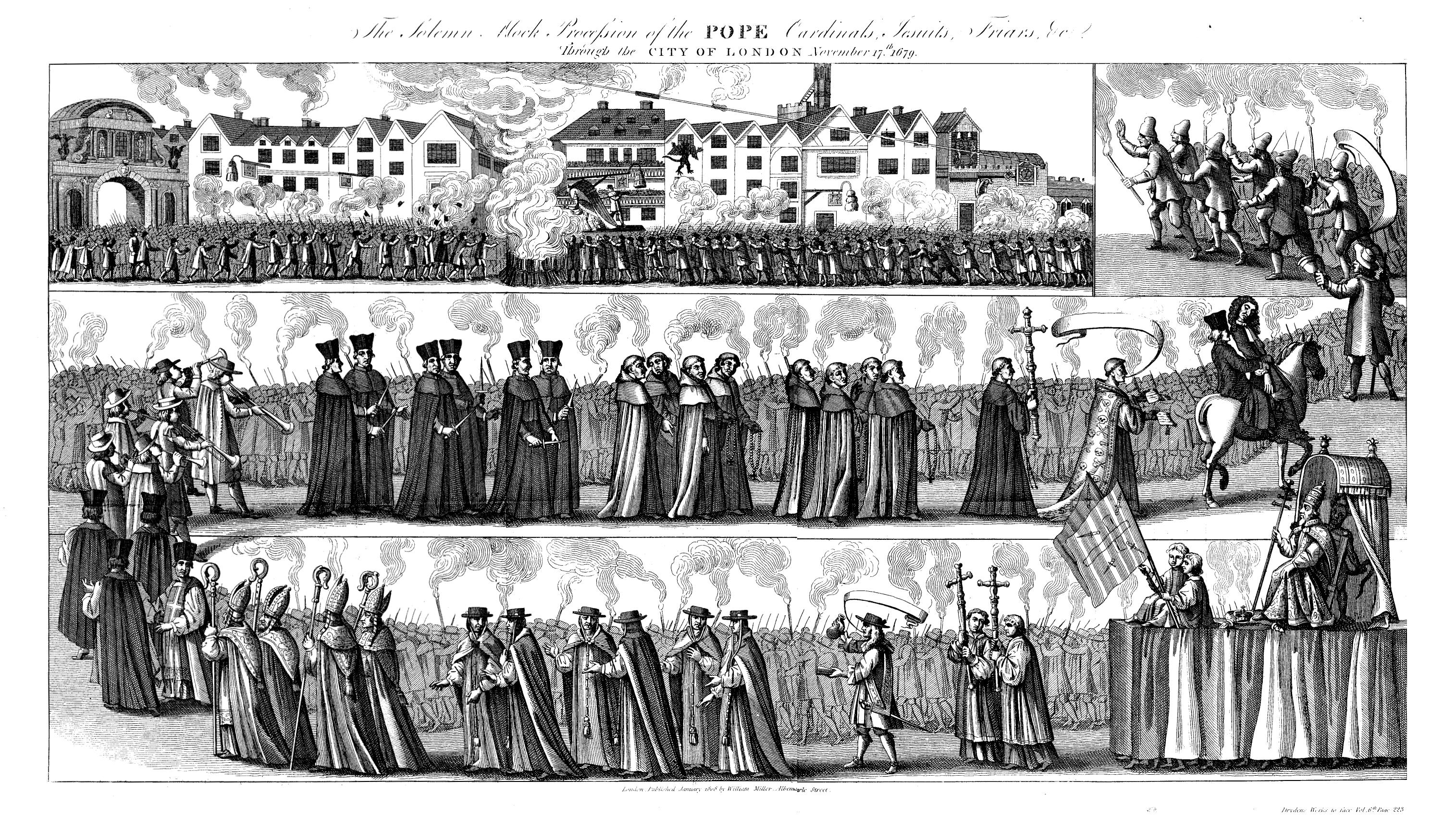
"The Solemn Mock Procession of the Pope, Cardinals, Jesuits, Friars, etc. through the City of London, 17 November 1679."

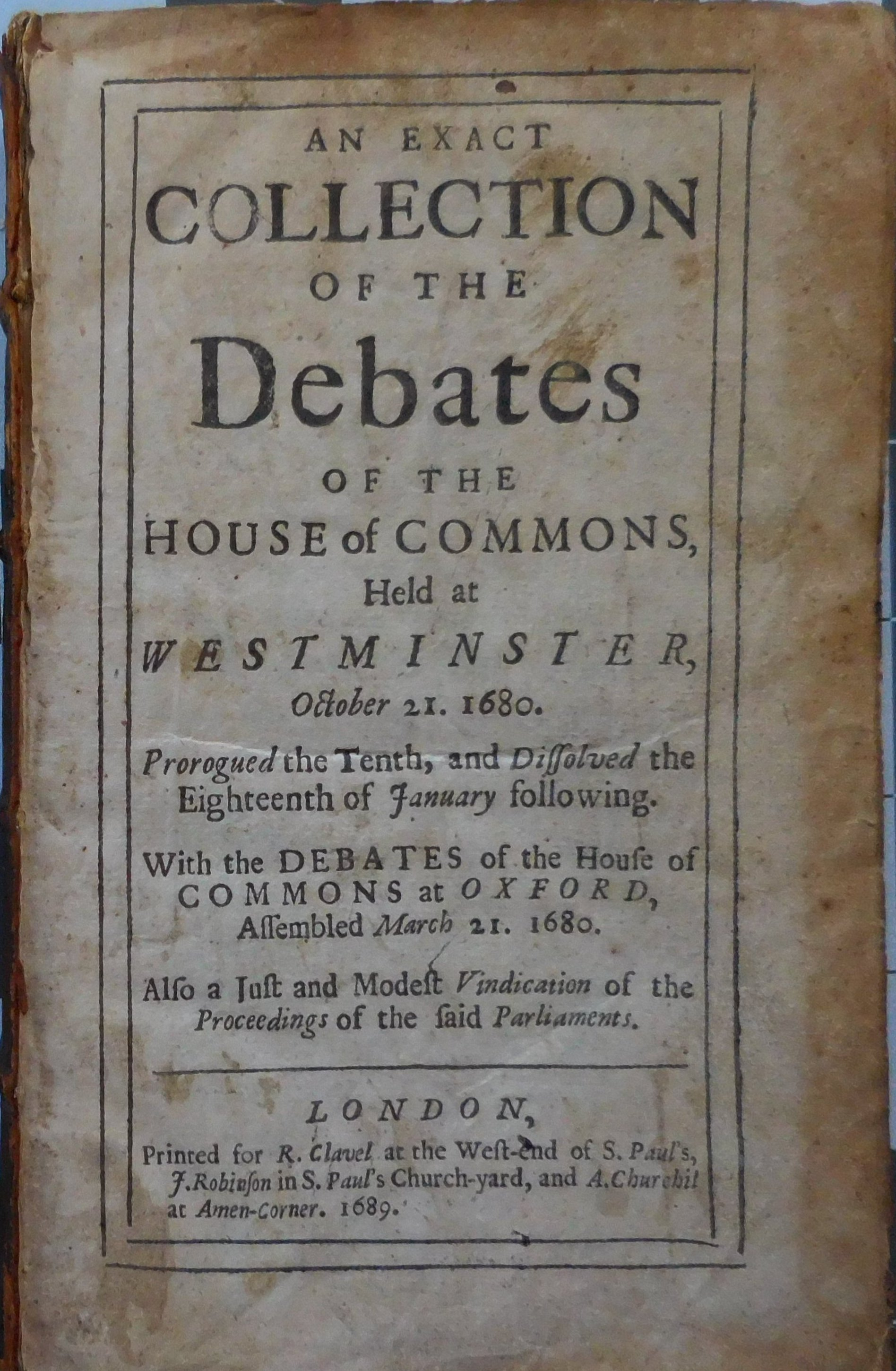
Book of the 1680 Westminster House of Commons debates

The Exclusion Bill Parliament was a Parliament of England during the reign of Charles II of England, named after the long saga of the Exclusion Bill. Summoned on 24 July 1679, but prorogued by the king so that it did not assemble until 21 October 1680, it was dissolved three months later on 18 January 1680/81.

== Background ==
Succeeding the long Cavalier Parliament and the short-lived Habeas Corpus Parliament of March to July 1679, this was the third parliament of the King's reign. Its character was much influenced by the aftermath of the Popish Plot crisis.

On 15 May 1679, the supporters of Anthony Ashley Cooper, 1st Earl of Shaftesbury, had introduced the Exclusion Bill into the Commons with the aim of excluding the king's brother, James, Duke of York, from the succession to the throne. A fringe group began to support the claim of Charles's illegitimate son, the Duke of Monmouth. As it seemed likely that the bill would pass, Charles exercised his royal prerogative to dissolve Parliament.

== History ==
A new parliament was summoned on 24 July 1679, and elections to the new House of Commons were held on various dates in the weeks which followed, but in general they went badly for the court party. With parliament expected to meet in October 1679, King Charles prorogued the parliament until 26 January 1680. Shaftesbury was anxious that the king might be intending not to meet this new parliament, so he launched a petitioning campaign to pressure the king to do so. He also wrote to the Duke of Monmouth, advising him to return from exile, and on 27 November 1679 Monmouth entered London amid scenes of widespread celebration. On 7 December 1679, a petition signed by Shaftesbury and fifteen other Whig peers called on Charles to meet parliament, and this was followed on 13 January 1679/80 by a similar petition of 20,000 signatures. However, instead of meeting parliament Charles further prorogued it and recalled his brother the Duke of York from Scotland. With this, Shaftesbury urged his friends on the Privy Council to resign, and four did so.

This agitation was opposed by George Jeffreys and Francis Wythens, who presented addresses expressing abhorrence of the petitioners, thus initiating the movement of the Abhorrers, who supported the actions of the king. Roger North noted that "The frolic went all over England", and the addresses of the Abhorrers from around the country formed a counterblast to those of the Petitioners.

Shaftesbury's party sought to establish a mass movement to keep alive the fears raised by the Popish Plot, organising huge processions in London in which the Pope was burnt in effigy. The King's supporters mustered their own propaganda in the form of memoirs of the Commonwealth government of Oliver Cromwell and its austerities. The King labelled the Whigs as subversives and nonconformists, and by early 1681 Shaftesbury's mass movement had died down.

Throughout the life of the parliament the supporters of Shaftesbury, becoming known as the Whigs, continued in their attempts to promote and pass the Exclusion Bill, and Charles had little doubt that it would pass the House of Commons, if not the Lords. The natural supporters of the king and his brother in the parliament were the High Anglicans, who as a political faction opposing the Exclusion Bill were known first as the Abhorrers, later as the Tories.

On 24 March 1680, Shaftesbury told the Privy Council he had received news that the Roman Catholics of Ireland were about to launch a rebellion, backed by the French. Several Privy Councillors, including Henry Coventry, thought Shaftesbury was making this story up to inflame public opinion, so an investigation was launched. This ultimately resulted in the execution of Oliver Plunkett, Roman Catholic Archbishop of Armagh, on spurious charges.

On 26 June 1680, Shaftesbury led a group of fifteen peers and commoners who presented an indictment to the Middlesex grand jury in Westminster Hall, charging the Duke of York with being a popish recusant, in violation of the penal laws. Before the grand jury could act, it was dismissed for interfering in matters of state. The next week, Shaftesbury again tried to indict the Duke of York, but again the grand jury was dismissed before it could take any action.

Parliament finally met on 21 October 1680, when the Commons elected for the first time William Williams as Speaker. He became the first Speaker of the House of Commons from Wales.

On 23 October, Shaftesbury in the House of Lords called for a committee to be set up to investigate the Popish Plot. The Exclusion Bill, which as widely foreseen had been passed by the Commons, came before the Lords on 15 November, when Shaftesbury gave an impassioned speech in favour of it, but the Lords rejected the Bill by 63 votes to 30. The Lords now wished to explore alternative ways of limiting the powers of a Roman Catholic successor to the throne, but Shaftesbury argued that the only viable alternative to exclusion was calling on the king to marry again and provide a new heir. On 23 December 1680, Shaftesbury gave another strong pro-Exclusion speech in the Lords, in the course of which he attacked the Duke of York, stated his mistrust of Charles II, and urged parliament not to approve any further taxes until "the King shall satisfie the People, that what we give is not to make us Slaves and Papists". With parliament pursuing the Irish investigation vigorously and threatening to impeach some of the king's judges, Charles prorogued parliament on 10 January 1680/81, and then dissolved it on 18 January, calling for fresh elections for a new Commons, intending the next parliament to meet at Oxford. On 25 January, Shaftesbury, Essex, and Salisbury presented the king with a petition signed by sixteen peers asking that parliament should be held at Westminster Hall rather than Oxford, but the king remained committed to his intention.

The next parliament was the Oxford Parliament of 1681.

== See also ==
- List of parliaments of England
- English general election, 1679 (October)
