= Tory =

Conservative political philosophy

A Tory (/ˈtɔːri/) is an individual who supports a political philosophy known as Toryism, based on a British version of traditionalist conservatism which upholds the established social order as it has evolved through the history of Great Britain. The Tory ethos has been summed up with the phrase "God, King (or Queen) and Country". Tories are monarchists, were historically of a high church Anglican religious heritage, and were opposed to the liberalism of the Whig party.

The philosophy originates from the Cavaliers, a royalist faction which supported the House of Stuart during the Wars of the Three Kingdoms. The Tories, a British political party which emerged during the late 17th century, was a reaction to the Whig-controlled Parliaments that succeeded the Cavalier Parliament. As a political term, Tory (a word of Irish origin) was first used during the Exclusion Crisis of 1678–1681.

Toryism also has exponents in other parts of the former British Empire, such as the Loyalists of British America, who opposed secession during the American War of Independence. Loyalists who fled to the Canadas at the end of the conflict, known as the United Empire Loyalists, formed the support base for political cliques in Upper and Lower Canada. Toryism remains prominent in the politics of Canada and the United Kingdom. The British Conservative Party and Conservative Party of Canada, and their supporters, continue to be referred to as Tories. Adherents to traditional Toryism in contemporary times are referred to as High Tories, who typically defend the ideas of hierarchy, natural order, and aristocracy.

== Etymology ==
The word Tory derives from the Irish tóraí, meaning 'outlaw' (literally 'pursuer'). It entered the English language in the 17th century, when it was used to describe Irish outlaws who survived by committing acts of robbery and plunder against English settlers. Later, it came to denote any Catholic or Royalist who had taken up arms against the English government.

The word entered English politics during the Exclusion Crisis, emerging as a pejorative term for supporters of the Duke of York and his hereditary right to inherit the throne despite his Catholic religion. According to Daniel Defoe, it was popularised by Titus Oates, who once received a warning that a group of Irish tories intended to assassinate him. Following this incident, Oates "could never hear any man [...] talk against the plot, or against the witnesses, but he thought he was one of these tories, and call'd almost every man a tory that oppos'd him in discourse; till at last the word tory became popular, and it stuck so close to the [Yorkist] party in all their bloody proceedings that they had no way to get it off".

Although both Tory and Whig originated as pejoratives, they soon became neutral terms for the two major factions in British politics. The suffix -ism was added to make Whiggism and Toryism, meaning the principles and methods of each faction.

During the American Revolution, the term Tory was used interchangeably with the term "Loyalist" in the Thirteen Colonies to refer to colonists who remained loyal to the Crown during the conflict. The term contrasts the colloquial term used to describe supporters of the revolution, "Patriots" or "Whigs".

== Political history ==
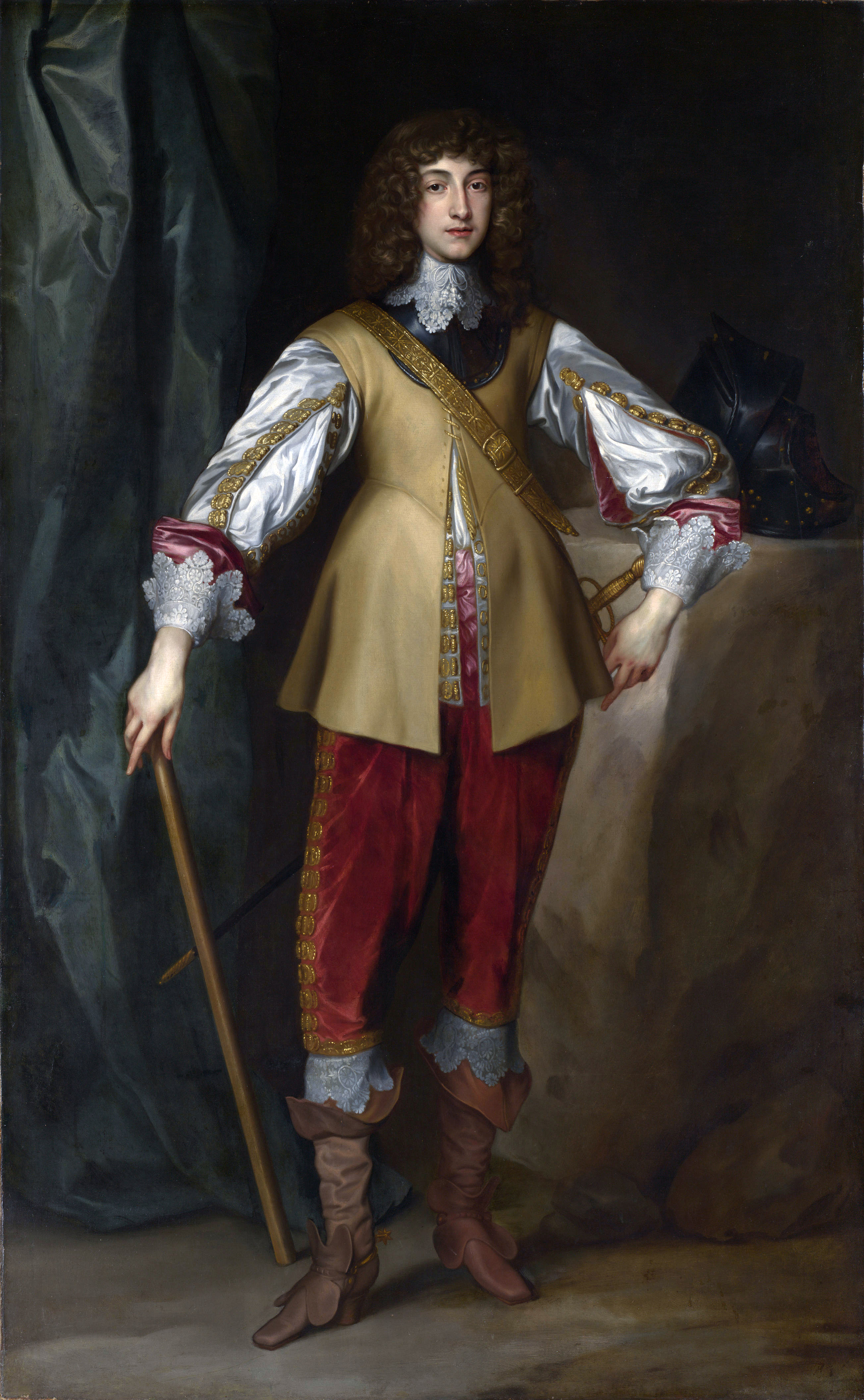
Royalist supporters, such as the Cavaliers, were referred to as tories during the Interregnum and Restoration period in Great Britain.

Towards the end of Charles II's reign (1660–1685) there was some debate about whether his brother, James, Duke of York, should be allowed to accede to the throne because of James's Catholicism. "Whigs", originally a reference to Scottish cattle-drovers (stereotypically radical anti-Catholic Covenanters), was the abusive term directed at those who wanted to exclude James on the grounds that he was a Catholic. Those who were not prepared to exclude James were labelled "Abhorrers" and later "Tories". Titus Oates applied the term Tory, which then signified an Irish robber, to those who would not believe in his Popish Plot and the name gradually became extended to all who were supposed to have sympathy with the Catholic Duke of York.

=== United Kingdom ===
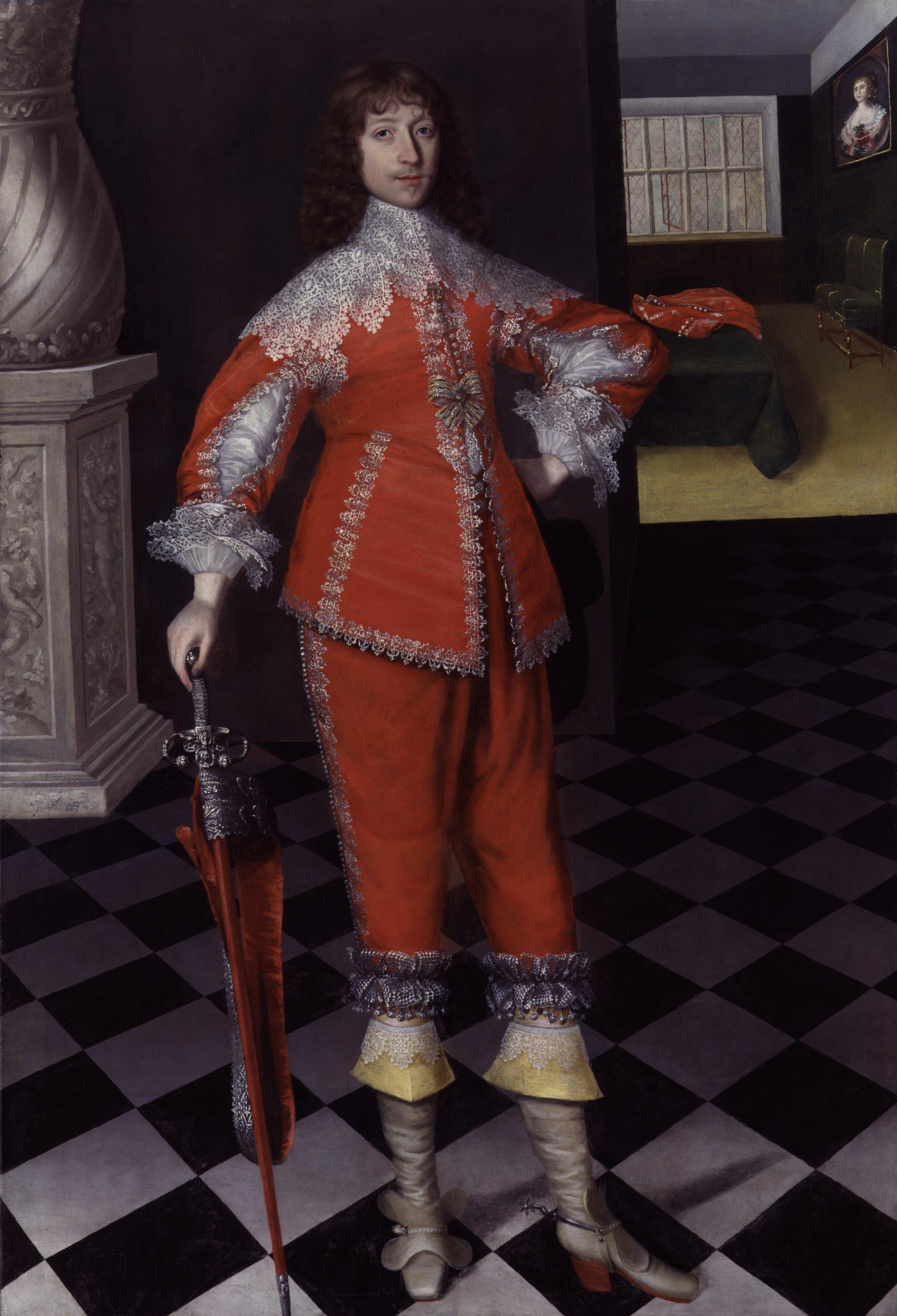
Lord Belasyse was the second Tory to lead a Ministry in Great Britain.

The Tory political faction originally emerged within the Parliament of England to uphold the legitimist rights of James II to succeed his brother Charles II to the thrones of the three kingdoms. James became a Catholic at a time when the state institutions were fiercely independent from the Catholic Church—this was an issue for the Exclusion Crisis supporting Patricians, the political heirs to the nonconformist Roundheads and Covenanters. During the Exclusion Crisis, the word Tory was applied in the Kingdom of England as a nickname to the opponents of the bill, called the Abhorrers. The word "Tory" had connotations of Papist and outlaw derived from its previous use in Ireland.

There were two Tory ministries after James II acceded to the throne: the first led by the Earl of Rochester, the second by Lord Belasyse. A significant faction took part in the Glorious Revolution, the military coup d'état that ousted James II with the Whigs to defend the Church of England and definitive Protestantism. A large but dwindling faction of Tories continued to support James in exile and his Stuart heirs to the throne, especially in 1714 after the Hanoverian Succession by George I, the first Hanoverian monarch. Although only a minority of Tories gave their adhesion to the Jacobite risings, this was used by the Whigs to discredit the Tories and paint them as traitors. After the advent of the Prime Ministerial system under the Whig Robert Walpole, Lord Bute's premiership in the reign of George III marked a revival. Under the Corn Laws (1815–1846), a majority of Tories supported protectionist agrarianism with tariffs being imposed at the time for higher food prices, self-sufficiency and enhanced wages in rural employment.

English Tories from the time of the Glorious Revolution up until the Reform Act 1832 were characterised by strong monarchist tendencies, support for the Church of England and hostility to radical reform, while the Tory party was an actual organisation which held power intermittently throughout the same period. Conservatism began to emerge in the late 18th century—it synthesised moderate Whig economic policies and many Tory social values to create a new political philosophy and faction in opposition to the French Revolution. Edmund Burke and William Pitt the Younger led the way in this. Interventionism and strong-armed forces were to prove a hallmark of Toryism under subsequent prime ministers. The word Conservative began to be used in place of Tory during the 1830s during Robert Peel's leadership. At the same time, followers began to reinterpret elements of Tory tradition under a banner of support for social reform and free trade. The party was eventually succeeded by the Conservative and Unionist Party, with the term Tory enduring to become an interchangeable phrase with Conservative.

=== Canada ===
The term Tory was first used to designate the pre-Confederation British ruling classes of Upper Canada and Lower Canada, known as the Family Compact and the Château Clique, an elite within the governing classes and often members within a section of society known as the United Empire Loyalists. The United Empire Loyalists were American loyalists from the Thirteen Colonies who resettled elsewhere in British North America during or after the American Revolutionary War.

In post-Confederation Canada, the terms "Red Tory" and "Blue Tory" have long been used to describe the two wings of the Conservative and previously the Progressive Conservative (PC) parties. The dyadic tensions originally arose out of the 1854 political union of British-Canadian Tories, French-Canadian traditionalists and the monarchist and loyalist leaning sections of the emerging commercial classes at the time—many of whom were uncomfortable with the pro-American and annexationist tendencies within the liberal Clear Grits. Tory strength and prominence in the political culture was a feature of life in Nova Scotia, New Brunswick, Prince Edward Island, Ontario and Manitoba.

By the 1930s, the factions within Canadian Toryism were associated with either the urban business elites or with rural traditionalists from the country's hinterland. A "Red Tory" is a member of the more moderate wing of the party (in the manner of John Farthing and George Grant). They are generally unified by their adherence to British traditions in Canada.

Throughout the course of Canadian history, the Conservative Party was generally controlled by MacDonaldian Tory elements, which in Canada meant an adherence to the English-Canadian traditions of Monarchy, Empire-Commonwealth, parliamentary government, nationalism, protectionism, social reform and eventually acceptance of the necessity of the welfare state.

Loyalist refugees on their way to the Canadas during the American Revolution. Loyalists helped establish the base of support for political cliques in the Canadas, locally referred to as Tories.

By the 1970s, the Progressive Conservative Party was a Keynesian-consensus party. With the onset of stagflation in the 1970s, some Canadian Tories came under the influence of neo-liberal developments in the United Kingdom and the United States, which highlighted the policies for privatization and supply-side interventions. In Canada, these Tories have been labelled neoconservatives—which has a somewhat different connotation in the United States. By the early 1980s, there was no clear neoconservative in the Tory leadership cadre, but Brian Mulroney (who became leader in 1983) eventually came to adopt many policies from the Margaret Thatcher and Ronald Reagan governments.

As Mulroney took the Progressive Conservative Party further in this direction, with policy initiatives in the areas of deregulation, privatization, free-trade and a consumption tax called the Goods and services tax (GST), many traditionally-minded Tories became concerned that a political and cultural schism was occurring within the party.

The 1986 creation of the Reform Party of Canada attracted some of the neo-liberals and social conservatives away from the Tory party, and as some of the neoconservative policies of the Mulroney government proved unpopular, some of the provincial-rights elements moved towards Reform as well. In 1993, Mulroney resigned rather than fight an election based on his record after almost nine years in power. This left the Progressive Conservatives in disarray and scrambling to understand how to make Toryism relevant in provinces such as Quebec, Saskatchewan, Alberta and British Columbia that had never had a strong Tory tradition and political culture.

Thereafter in the 1990s, the Progressive Conservatives were a small party in the House of Commons of Canada and could only exert legislative pressure on the government through their power in the Senate of Canada. Eventually, through death and retirements, this power waned. Joe Clark returned as leader, but the schism with the Reformers effectively watered down the combined Blue and Red Tory vote in Canada.

By the late 1990s, there was talk of the necessity of uniting the right in Canada to deter further Liberal Party majorities. Many Tories—both red and blue—opposed such moves, while others took the view that all would have to be pragmatic if there was any hope of reviving a strong party system. The Canadian Alliance party (as the Reform Party had become) and some leading Tories came together on an informal basis to see if they could find common ground. While Progressive Conservative Leader Joe Clark rebuffed the notion, the talks moved ahead and eventually, in December 2003, the Canadian Alliance and the Progressive Conservative parties voted to rejoin as a new party called the Conservative Party of Canada.

After the merger of the Progressive Conservatives with the Canadian Alliance in 2003, there was debate as to whether the "Tory" appellation should survive at the federal level. Commentators speculated that some Alliance members would take offence at the term. Nevertheless, it was officially adopted by the merged party during the 2004 leadership convention. Stephen Harper, former leader of the Conservative Party of Canada and Prime Minister from 2006 to 2015, regularly refers to himself as a Tory and says the new party is a natural evolution of the conservative political movement. However, there were some dissident Red Tories who were against the merger. They formed the rival Progressive Canadian Party. In 2025, the centrist Alberta Party renamed itself the Progressive Tory Party of Alberta.

=== United States ===
Loyalist troops at the Battle of Kings Mountain

The term "Loyalist" was used during the American Revolution for and by those who remained loyal to the British Crown. Loyalists were frequently called "Tories" by Patriots, who used this term as a derogatory label. About 80% of the Loyalists remained in the United States after the war. The 60,000 or so Loyalists who settled in Nova Scotia, Quebec, the Bahamas, or returned to Great Britain after the American War of Independence are known as United Empire Loyalists.

On 12 February 1798, Thomas Jefferson (of the Democratic-Republican Party) described the conservative Federalist Party as "[a] political Sect [...] believing that the executive is the branch of our government which the most needs support, [who] are called federalists, sometimes aristocrats or monocrats, and sometimes Tories, after the corresponding sect in the English Government of the same definition". However, that was clearly a hostile description by the Federalists' foes of whom Jefferson was one and not a name used by the Federalists themselves. The Federalist Party was dissolved in 1835 with no successor parties.

Later, the Democratic-Republican Party splintered into different parties, with the two dissidences being the National Republican Party and the Whig Party. The rest of the party would become the Democratic Party. The National Republican Party would then merge with the Whig Party, giving rise to what would be called the Second Party System. Although the Whig Party adopted its name from its British counterpart, the term "Tories" had already completely fallen out of favour in the US.

During the American Civil War, Confederate forces commonly referred to Southern Unionists as Tories, drawing a parallel with the Tories of the American Revolutionary War. To the Confederates, Southern Unionists symbolised a direct challenge to their political aspirations and were viewed as "traitors to the white race". Conversely, Unionists regarded Southern Unionists as a loyal segment of the Southern population, swept by the tide of succession, and around whom the foundations of Reconstruction would be built.

==== Texas Revolution ====
In Texas in 1832–1836, support for the Texas Revolution was not unanimous. The "Tories" were men who supported the Mexican government. The Tories generally were long-term property holders whose roots were outside of the lower South. They typically had little interest in politics and sought conciliation rather than war. The Tories wanted to preserve the economic, political and social gains that they enjoyed as citizens of Mexico, and the revolution threatened to jeopardise those gains.

== Current usage ==
Tory has become shorthand for a member of the Conservative Party or for the party in general in Canada and the UK, and can be used interchangeably with the word Conservative.

=== North America ===
In the United States, Tory is often used as a historical term to describe supporters of Great Britain during the American Revolution. However, in Canadian parlance, British supporters during the revolution are called Loyalists, with the term Tory being used as a contemporary political term.

In Canada, a Tory refers to a member of the Conservative Party of Canada, while the party as a whole are colloquially referred to as the Tories. It is also used to refer to the party's predecessor, including the Progressive Conservative Party of Canada. In addition to the federal Conservative Party, the terms have also been used to describe provincial Conservative/Progressive Conservative parties and their members. LGBTory is an advocacy group for LGBT supporters of the Conservative Party of Canada and provincial conservative parties.

The terms "Blue Tory" and "Red Tory" describe two factions of Canada's federal and provincial conservative parties. The former leader of the Progressive Conservative Party of Ontario, Tim Hudak, adopted the term "Purple Tory" to characterize himself, aiming to avoid the strong ideological stance and instead provide a conciliatory position between Blue Tories and Red Tories. The term "Pink Tory" is also used by Canadian politics as a pejorative term to describe a conservative party member who is perceived as liberal.

=== United Kingdom ===
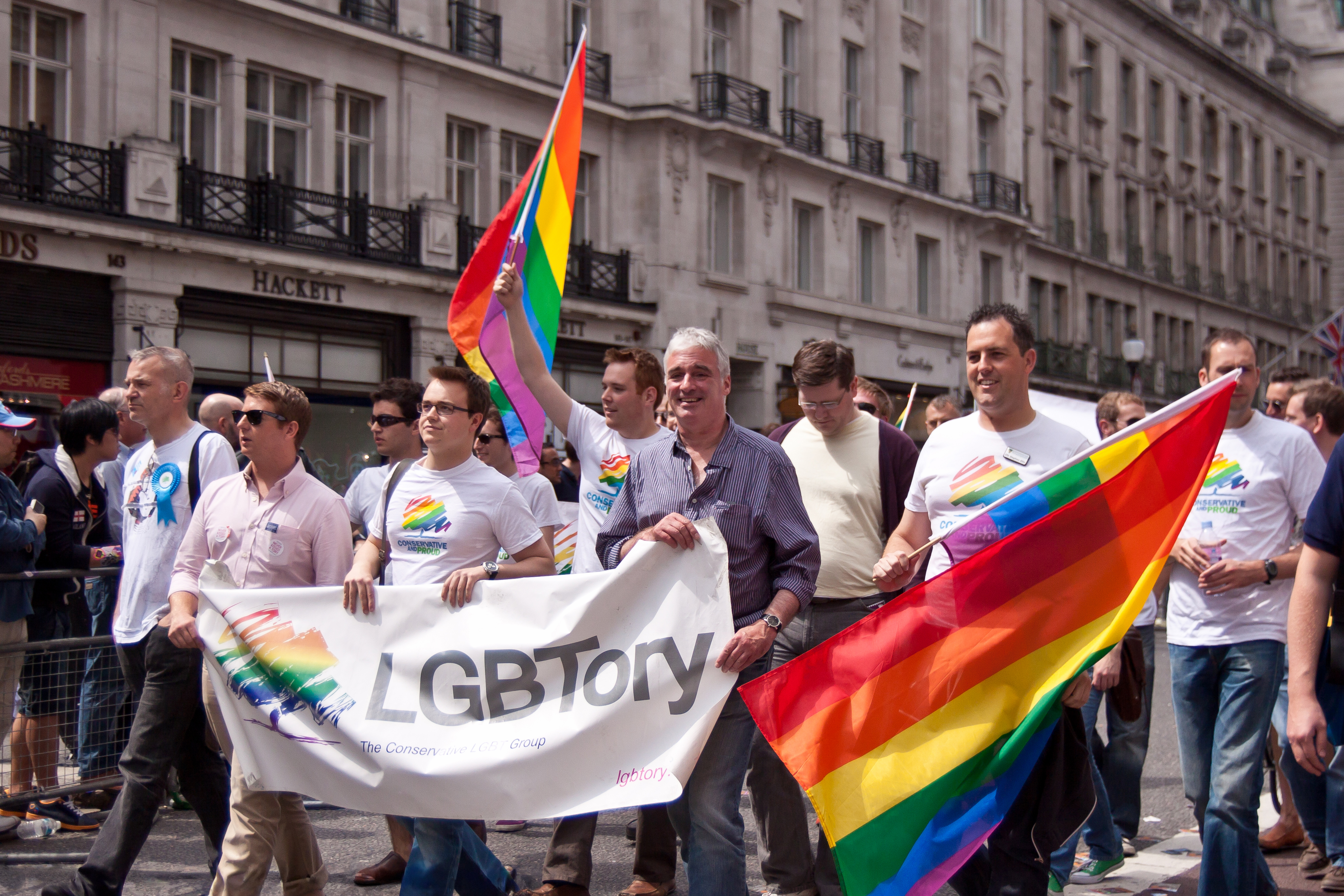
Members of LGBT+ Conservatives with a banner reading LGBTory. The group is the LGBT wing of the United Kingdom's Conservative Party.

In the United Kingdom, the Conservative and Unionist Party is often colloquially referred to as the Tories, both by themselves and by opponents, and also in the media. Members and voters of the party are also often referred to as "Tories" as well. The British Broadcasting Corporation's own style guide permits the use of the term Tory, although it requires the term Conservative to be used in its first instance.

In Scotland and Wales, the term Tory refers not only to members and supporters of the Scottish Conservative and Unionist Party, but is also used to accuse other parties of being insufficiently opposed to that party. For example, members and supporters of the Scottish Labour Party (especially those from the "Blairite and Brownite" factions) may be referred to as Red Tories or Tory-lite by traditional Labour members and advocates of an independent Scotland and independent Wales such as members and supporters of the Scottish National Party, the Alba Party (formerly Solidarity), the Scottish Socialist Party, Sovereignty, Alliance to Liberate Scotland, the Scottish Greens and Plaid Cymru. Similarly, Labour supporters have referred to SNP members and supporters as being either Tartan Tories, Yellow Tories, Nats/Nationalists or Cybernats with Scottish Greens, Sovereignty and Alliance to Liberate Scotland supporters as Green Nationalists/Nats, Watermelons, Liberators or Alliance voters with Scottish Liberal Democrats members and supporters referred to as Yellow Tories.

=== Australia ===
In Australia, Tory is occasionally used as a pejorative term by members of the Australian Labor Party to refer to conservative members of the Liberal Party of Australia and National Party of Australia parties (who are in a long-standing coalition). The term is not used anywhere near as often as in the UK and Canada, and it is rare – though not unheard of – for members of those parties to self-describe as 'Tories'.

Writing in the Australian Dictionary of Biography, Michael Persse notes the impact of 'Liberal Toryism' on the colonial era Australian statesman William Charles Wentworth when he was in Britain. Chief Justice Garfield Barwick titled his memoir A Radical Tory. The newspaper of the University of Sydney Conservative Club is named The Sydney Tory. A moderate faction of the Australian Greens has been pejoratively dubbed the Tree Tories by the hard left faction.

== Modern proponents ==
- Cornerstone Group – Conservative Party (UK) faction
- The Dorchester Review – history and commentary magazine founded in Canada
- The Salisbury Review – political quarterly founded in the United Kingdom

== See also ==
- Tory socialism
- Tory Party (disambiguation)
