= English general election, 1679 =

There were two general elections held in England in 1679:

- March 1679 English general election
- October 1679 English general election
