= Tory Party (disambiguation) =

The Tory Party was a British and Irish political party between 1678 and 1834.

Tory Party may also refer to

== United Kingdom ==
=== National ===
- The Conservative Party (UK), the modern British political party colloquially referred to as the Tory Party.

=== Regional ===
- Ulster Unionist Party
- Unionist Party (Scotland)
- Gibraltar Social Democrats

== Canada ==
=== Federal ===
- Conservative Party of Canada (2003 onwards)

=== Regional ===
- United Conservative Party of Alberta
- British Columbia Conservative Party
- Progressive Conservative Party of Manitoba
- Progressive Conservative Party of New Brunswick
- Progressive Conservative Party of Newfoundland and Labrador
- Progressive Conservative Association of Nova Scotia
- Progressive Conservative Party of Ontario and predecessors:
- Progressive Conservative Party of Prince Edward Island
- Coalition Avenir Québec
- Saskatchewan Party
- Yukon Party and predecessors:
  - Yukon Progressive Conservative Party (1978–1991)
- Splits
  - Progressive Canadian Party
  - Progressive Tory Party of Alberta
  - Conservative Party of Quebec

=== Historical ===
==== Federal ====
- Conservative Party of Canada (1867–1942)
- Progressive Conservative Party of Canada (1942 and 2003)

==== Alberta ====
- Progressive Conservative Association of Alberta (1905–2017)

==== Lower Canada ====
- Château Clique

==== Quebec ====
- Progressive Conservative Party of Quebec (1985–1989)
- Conservative Party of Quebec (1867–1935)
- Parti bleu (1854–1867)

==== Saskatchewan ====
- Progressive Conservative Party of Saskatchewan

==== Upper Canada ====
- Family Compact (1820–1848)
- Upper Canada Tories (1820–1853)

== United States ==
- Loyalist (American Revolution)
- Southern Unionist, during the American Civil War, so called by their opponents
- The Tory Party, of the Yale Political Union

== Australian ==
- Australian Liberal Party

== New Zealand ==
- New Zealand National Party

== Ireland ==
- Irish Unionist Alliance and predecessor:
  - Irish Conservative Party

== See also ==
- Tory
