= Oxford Parliament (1681) =

The Oxford Parliament, also known as the Third Exclusion Parliament, was an English Parliament assembled in the city of Oxford for one week from 21 March 1681 until 28 March 1681 during the reign of Charles II of England. This was the last time Parliament met outside Westminster.

Summoning Parliament to meet in Oxford at Christ Church College, a Royalist stronghold which had been Charles I's capital during the English Civil War, was designed to deprive the Whig opposition of the grassroots support from the London masses, which was an important factor in earlier stages of the Exclusion Crisis.

Succeeding the Exclusion Bill Parliament, this was the fifth and last parliament of the King's reign. Both Houses of Parliament met and the King delivered a speech to them on the first day. The Speaker was William Williams, who had been the Speaker in the previous Parliament. He was elected unanimously and delivered a speech on 22 March. The Oxford Parliament was dismissed after another Exclusion Bill was presented with popular support. Charles dissolved it after securing the necessary funds from King Louis XIV of France.

== In the Glorious Revolution ==
During the Glorious Revolution, surviving members of the Oxford Parliament met again in December 1688, following the flight of King James II – leading to the election of the irregular Convention Parliament (1689), which conferred the throne jointly on William III and Mary II.

== In literature ==
The events of the Oxford Parliament are described in the final part of Robert Neill's historical novel The Golden Days.

== See also ==
- List of parliaments of England
- 1681 English general election
- Oxford Parliament (1258)
- Oxford Parliament (1644)
