= March 1679 English general election =

General election in England

- March 1679
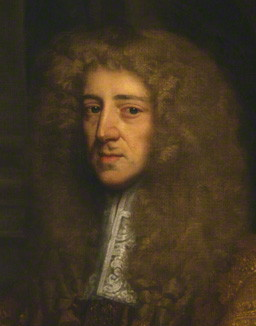
	First party	Second party	Third party
		Tor
Leader	Anthony Ashley Cooper	John Ernle
Party	Whig	Tory	Unknown
Seats won	218	137	167
Seat change	▲79	▼242
- Composition of the House of Commons after the election

The March 1679 English general election resulted in the Habeas Corpus Parliament, named after the Habeas Corpus Act, which it enacted in May, 1679 to define and strengthen the ancient prerogative writ benefitting all subjects. It was dissolved while in recess on 12 July 1679.

On the current issue of excluding the King's younger brother from the succession to the throne, 218 members were in favour of the Exclusion Bill, while 137 were opposed. This saw a significant increase in the number of Whigs compared to the previous Cavalier Parliament. However, 167 members did not attend the parliament at all, so their view about Exclusion is unknown.
