= Robert Neill (writer) =

British writer (1907–1979)

Robert Geoffrey Neill (19 November 1905 – 1979) was an English writer of historical fiction, best known for his debut novel, Mist over Pendle, published in 1951, which has remained in print since first appearing. The novel presents a fictional account of the events leading up to the famous Pendle witches trial in 1612.

== Life and career ==
Neill was born in Prestwich, Lancashire, England, into a family with long-standing local connections. His great-grandfather, also called Robert Neill, was a former Mayor of Manchester (two terms, 1866–68), though his mother came from Colne, in Central Lancashire, an area to which he would return continually in his novels.

Neill was educated at King Edward VII School, Lytham, on the Lancashire coast, before reading Natural Science at Cambridge (a choice he would later describe as a mistake). He became a research worker for the Scottish Marine Biological Association, a schoolmaster at Burton upon Trent, and an Electrical Lieutenant in the Royal Naval Volunteer Reserve during World War II.

Neill moved to Cheltenham, Gloucestershire in 1946, becoming a lecturer in Biology and Zoology at St Paul's College of Education. He also joined the management committee of the Cheltenham Literature Festival.

Neill had always had an interest in historical fiction, which he described as arising from his liking for historical buildings and for Lancashire history and legend. He was a critical reader, alive to errors in detail and accuracy, and began, with his aunt's encouragement, to consider that he could do better himself. Mist over Pendle was accepted for publication by Hutchinson, and became an immediate world-wide success, enabling Neill to become a full-time writer.

Neill continued to live in Cheltenham for several years but eventually returned to the northwest, settling in Cumberland, stating that he was too much of a northerner to ever feel properly comfortable south of the River Mersey. He died in Keswick, Cumbria in 1979.

== Research method and style ==
His work was based upon extensive research into original sources, such as Parish Registers, and contemporary documents, using textbooks only as a means of identifying such sources. He would visit the scenes of intended novels, going over the ground personally to ensure that his books would be authentic. Neill told a tale of one Lancashire bookseller who, before putting Mist over Pendle on display, checked all places and distances in the book, stating that if there were any inaccuracies, his customers would bring the books back.

In 1952, Neill gave his view that "The historical novel should not be a straightforward chronicle, that would be most dull, but should be a blend of recorded fact and plausible imagination."

Though the majority of his books were set in and around Lancashire, Neill was equally convincing with books set in Worcestershire (Rebel Heiress), Northumberland (Black William) and Kent (Hangman's Cliff). He ventured outside historical fiction with two novels: So Fair a House, set in 1958 but concerned with historical events that intrude into the present, and the wholly contemporary Wonder Winter.

== Works ==
Books by Robert Neill. Critical reviews of all the novels and some background information are to be found at Martin Crookall's site and the working site: Some notes on Robert Neill, his novels and the historical background.

- Mist over Pendle (1951) (American title, The Elegant Witch)
- Moon in Scorpio (1952) (American title, Traitor's Moon)
- Rebel Heiress (1955)
- Black William (1955)
- Hangman’s Cliff (1956)
- Song of Sunrise (1958) (re-titled in paperback, The Mills of Colne)
- So Fair a House (1960)
- Wonder Winter (1961)
- The Shocking Miss Anstey (1965)
- The Devil’s Weather (1966)
- Witch Bane (1967)
- Crown and Mitre (1970)
- The Golden Days (1972)
- Lillibullero (1975)
- Witchfire at Lammas (1977)
- The Devil’s Door (1979)

=== Burnaby Trilogy ===
- Crown and Mitre (1970): With the death of Oliver Cromwell, the edifice of the Commonwealth - erected and maintained by Cromwell's strong personality - starts shaking. Hal Burnaby - a young Cavalier - gets deeply involved in the complicated and risky business of restoring King Charles II to his throne. At the same time, Burnaby is also busy courting and winning his beloved Alison. Finally, the Stuart Restoration is achieved, and the grateful King knights Hal Burnaby in recognition of his valiant service. However, Burnaby dislikes the opulence and corruption of the Restoration court and prefers to retire with Alison to the quiet life of a country gentleman.
- The Golden Days (1972): In the turbulent years of the Exclusion Crisis (1679-1681) Hal Burnaby is again drawn deeply into public affairs, when being elected Member of Parliament for his rural constituency. Staunchly loyal to King Charles, he takes part in the Royalist efforts to block the newly founded, militantly Protestant Whig party - which seeks to exclude the King's Catholic brother, the Duke of York, from succession to the throne. Conversely, Burnaby's neighbor and fellow MP is Richard Gibson, an ex-Colonel in Oliver Cromwell's New Model Army, who is an outspoken Whig and member of the Radical Green Ribbon Club. Despite their sharp political differences, Burnaby and Gibson come to deeply respect each other, and they share the anxiety lest the unfolding crisis escalate beyond control and England be plunged again into all-out civil war. Eventually, Burnaby's son marries Gibson's daughter, with the full blessing of both fathers. Meanwhile, the episode of the Oxford Parliament ends with a Royalist victory and the humiliation of the Whigs - but the underlying problems had not been resolved, and they would burst out even more fiercely a few years hence.
- Lillibullero (1975): With the death of King Charles, the Catholic Duke of York does become King James II. Hal Burnaby, by his part in the Exclusion Crisis, had a share in bringing this result about. However, he soon finds himself unable to render to the new King the same kind of enthusiastic loyalty he had given to his dead brother. King James' autocratic conduct, the bloody suppression of the Monmouth Rebellion - and most especially, King James' attempts to impose the Catholic Church on England - increasingly alienate Burnaby. Moreover, in a personal encounter with the King, Burnaby is roughly berated and insulted for having voted in Parliament against the King's wishes. Increasingly, Burnaby finds himself aligned with Whigs, with whom he earlier had nothing in common - and even more so does Burnaby's son Nick, now a rising young barrister in London who is drawn ever deeper into opposition to King James. When the Trial of the Seven Bishops heightens tensions to the point that a new civil war seems inevitable, Burnaby discovers that this time he and Gibson are on the same side. The two of them eventually play a major role in forming an armed body to support the Prince of Orange, Burnaby being the adjutant and Gibson - a Colonel of Horse. Happily, there is little need for actual fighting - King James had managed to unite almost everybody in England, so that there were few left to fight for him. Still, once the Glorious Revolution is an accomplished fact and James Stuart boards a barge en route to irrevocable exile, Hal Burnaby - still a staunch Royalist at heart - is among the small crowd coming to see him off. Despite everything, Burnaby feels a bit guilty about having helped to dethrone him.
- A possible planned sequel: In the blurb of the 1970 Crown and Mitre the publisher, Hutchinson of London, noted that "Robert Neil plans a whole sequence of books about the Seventeenth and Eighteenth Centuries". As actually written, the Burnaby books end with the Glorious Revolution which is still in the 17th century. Lillibulero includes a part where John, Hal Burnaby's elder son, enters the service of Princess Anne - the future Queen - and forms strong links with John Churchill who would become the Duke of Marlborough. This plot element might have been intended to introduce a further Burnaby book, set during the reign of Queen Anne and the War of Spanish Succession. However, such was never written.
