= October 1679 English general election =

General election in England

- October 1679

All 513 seats in the House of Commons 257 seats needed for a majority
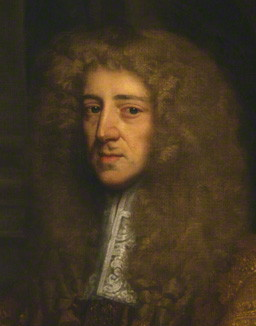
	First party	Second party
		Tor
Leader	Anthony Ashley Cooper	John Ernle
Party	Whig	Tory
Seats won	310	220
Seat change	▲92	▲83
- Composition of the House of Commons after the election

The October 1679 English general election returned a majority of members in favour of the Exclusion Bill. Consequently, this parliament was known as the Exclusion Bill Parliament. It did not assemble until 21 October 1680, and was dissolved three months later on 18 January 1681.
