= Habeas Corpus Parliament =

The Habeas Corpus Parliament, also known as the First Exclusion Parliament, was a short-lived English Parliament which assembled on 6 March 1679 (or 1678, Old Style) during the reign of Charles II of England, the third parliament of the King's reign. It is named after the Habeas Corpus Act, which it enacted in May 1679.

The Habeas Corpus Parliament sat for two sessions. The first session sat from 6 March 1679 to 13 March 1679, the second session from 15 March 1679 to 26 May 1679. It was dissolved while in recess on 12 July 1679.

== History ==
The parliament succeeded the long Cavalier Parliament of 1661–1678/79, which the King had dissolved. Elections were held for a new parliament on various dates in February 1678/79, after which the Earl of Shaftesbury estimated that of the members of the new House of Commons one third were friends of the court, three-fifths favouring the Opposition, and the rest capable of going either way. On Thursday, 6 March, the Parliament first met, and the King opened the session with a speech to both houses, in which he said:

I have done many great Things already... as the Exclusion of the Popish Lords from their Seats in Parliament; the Execution of several Men, both upon the score of the Plot, and the Murder of Sir Edmundbury Godfrey... I have disbanded as much of the Army as I could get Money to do; and I am ready to disband the rest so soon as you shall reimburse me the Money they have cost me, and will enable me to pay off the Remainder: And above all, I have commanded my Brother to absent himself from me, because I would not leave malicious Men room to say, I had not removed all Causes which could be pretended to influence me towards Popish Counsels... I have not been wanting in giving Orders for putting all the present Laws in Execution against Papists; and I am ready to join in the making such farther Laws, as may be necessary for securing the Kingdom against Popery... I must needs put you in mind how necessary it will be to have a good Strength at Sea, next Summer, since our Neighbours are making naval Preparations... I will conclude as I begun, with my earnest Desires to have this a Healing Parliament; and I do give you this Assurance that I will with my Life defend both the Protestant Religion, and the Laws of this Kingdom, and I do expect from you to be defended from the Calumny, as well as the Danger of those worst of Men, who endeavour to render me, and my Government, odious to my People. The rest I leave to the Lord Chancellor.

Lord Chancellor Finch replied.

After several days of debate and correspondence with the King, William Gregory, who had served only one year in Parliament, was elected to serve as Speaker of the House of Commons, this being agreed as a compromise between the Commons, who had wished to re-elect Edward Seymour, and the King, who objected to Seymour.

On 25 March, Shaftesbury made a strong speech in the House of Lords warning of the threat of Popery and arbitrary government, and denouncing the royal administrations in the Kingdom of Scotland under John Maitland, 1st Duke of Lauderdale, and in the Kingdom of Ireland under James Butler, 1st Duke of Ormonde. He also denounced anew the Earl of Danby. Parliament resumed the pursuit of Danby's impeachment, showing even more anger against him than its Cavalier Parliament predecessor had.

As the parliament's name implies, its most notable achievement was the passage of the Habeas Corpus Act 1679. This was part of the struggle led by Shaftesbury to exclude the King's Roman Catholic brother James, Duke of York, from the succession to the throne, as Shaftesbury and his allies believed James would rule England arbitrarily.

On 15 May 1679, Shaftesbury's supporters in the Commons introduced the Exclusion Bill, which had the specific aim of disbarring the Duke of York from the throne. When it appeared that the bill was likely to pass, Charles used his prerogative to dissolve Parliament, which was prorogued on 27 May 1679 and did not meet again before it came to an end on 12 July 1679.

On 22 June, in the dying days of the parliament, although some weeks after its final meeting, came the Battle of Bothwell Bridge, at which troops commanded by the King's illegitimate son James Scott, 1st Duke of Monmouth defeated a rebellion in Scotland by militant Presbyterian Covenanters against Lauderdale's rule. Following the battle, Lauderdale was replaced in Scotland by the Duke of York.

== See also ==
- List of parliaments of England
- English general election, 1679 (March)
