= Abhorrers =

English faction

Abhorrers is the name given in 1679 to the persons who expressed their abhorrence at the action of those who had signed petitions urging King Charles II of England to assemble Parliament.

At the time, James, Duke of York and James Scott, 1st Duke of Monmouth were seen as rival potential heirs to Charles, and an Exclusion Bill had been passed by the House of Commons to specifically exclude York from the line of succession. Charles dissolved two parliaments to prevent this bill from becoming law, and briefly attempted to rule with no active parliament. He was deluged with petitions urging him to call for an assembly of the Parliament.

The event served as a new round of political conflict between royalist and parliamentarian factions, and led to the emergence of the Whig and Tory factions as new political parties.

== The Duke of York and the Duke of Monmouth as rivals ==
Feeling against Catholics, and especially against James, Duke of York, was running strongly; the Exclusion Bill had been passed by the House of Commons, and the popularity of James Scott, 1st Duke of Monmouth, was very great.

== Rivalry between royalist and parliamentarian factions ==
To prevent this bill from passing into law, Charles had dissolved the parliament in July 1679, and in the following October had prorogued its successor, which became known as the Exclusion Bill Parliament, without allowing it to meet. He was then deluged with petitions urging him to call it together. This agitation was opposed by Sir George Jeffreys and Francis Wythens, who presented addresses expressing abhorrence of the Petitioners, and thus initiated the movement of the abhorrers, who supported the action of the king. "The frolic went all over England," says Roger North; and the addresses of the Abhorrers which reached the king from all parts of the country formed a counterblast to those of the Petitioners. It is said that the terms Whig and Tory were first applied to English political parties as consequence of this dispute.
