= Tories (British political party) =

British political party (1678–1760; 1783–1834)

First Tories
- Leading figures: Robert Harley; The Viscount Bolingbroke; Sir William Wyndham
- Founded: 1678
- Dissolved: c. 1760
- Preceded by: Cavaliers
- Ideology: High Toryism; Jacobitism (some factions, covertly); Divine right of kings; Anglicanism; Factions: Moderate toryism
- Colours: Blue

Second Tories
- Leaders: William Pitt the Younger; The Earl of Liverpool; The Duke of Wellington; Sir Robert Peel
- Founded: c. 1783
- Dissolved: 1834
- Succeeded by: Conservative Party
- Ideology: Conservatism (British); High Toryism; Progressive conservatism
- Political position: Centre-right to right-wing
- Religion: Anglicanism
- Colours: Blue

The Tories were a loosely organised political faction and later a political party, in the Parliaments of England, Scotland, Ireland, Great Britain and the United Kingdom. They first emerged during the 1679 Exclusion Crisis, when they opposed Whig efforts to exclude James, Duke of York from the succession on the grounds of his Catholicism. Despite their fervent opposition to state-sponsored Catholicism, Tories opposed his exclusion because of their belief that inheritance based on birth was the foundation of a stable society.

In the 18th century, the Tories' overarching ideology and stated objective was maintaining a strong established Church of England; in practice, this meant they opposed tolerance not only for Catholics (which at the time the Whigs also opposed) but also for dissenting Protestants (which the Whigs supported). Their opposition to tolerance occasionally prevailed over their preference for absolute monarchy, with some Tories opting to support the Exclusion Bill due to James' support for partial freedom of worship.

Under the later Stuart monarchs, Tories participated in government under the Ministry of the Chits, Carmarthen ministry, Godolphin–Marlborough ministry and Junto Tory ministry, and formed the major component of the Harley ministry (1710–14).

After the succession of George I in 1714, the Tories had no part in government. They ceased to exist as an organised political entity in the early 1760s; however, the term continued to be used in subsequent years as a term of self-description by some political writers. During the American revolution, Tory became synonymous with loyalist as ex-tories in parliament showed fervent support for the crown in suppressing the revolution, as opposed to patriots, or Whigs.

About 20 years later, a new Tory party (which had no real link to the old Tory party except for its name) arose and participated in government between 1783 and 1830, with William Pitt the Younger followed by Robert Jenkinson, 2nd Earl of Liverpool; the new Tories generally opposed expansions of voting rights and supported crackdowns on protests and subversive movements, driven by fears that Britain could face a revolution like the one which had taken place in France. The Whigs won control of Parliament in the 1831 election, which was fought largely on the issue of electoral reform, opposed by the Tories. The Representation of the People Act 1832 removed the rotten boroughs, many of which were controlled by Tories and the Party was reduced to 175 MPs in the 1832 elections.

Under the leadership of Robert Peel, who issued a policy document known as the Tamworth Manifesto, the Tories began to transform into the Conservative Party. However, his repeal of the Corn Laws in 1846 caused the party to break apart; the faction led by the Earl of Derby and Benjamin Disraeli went on to become the modern Conservative Party, whose members are still commonly referred to as Tories.

== Name ==
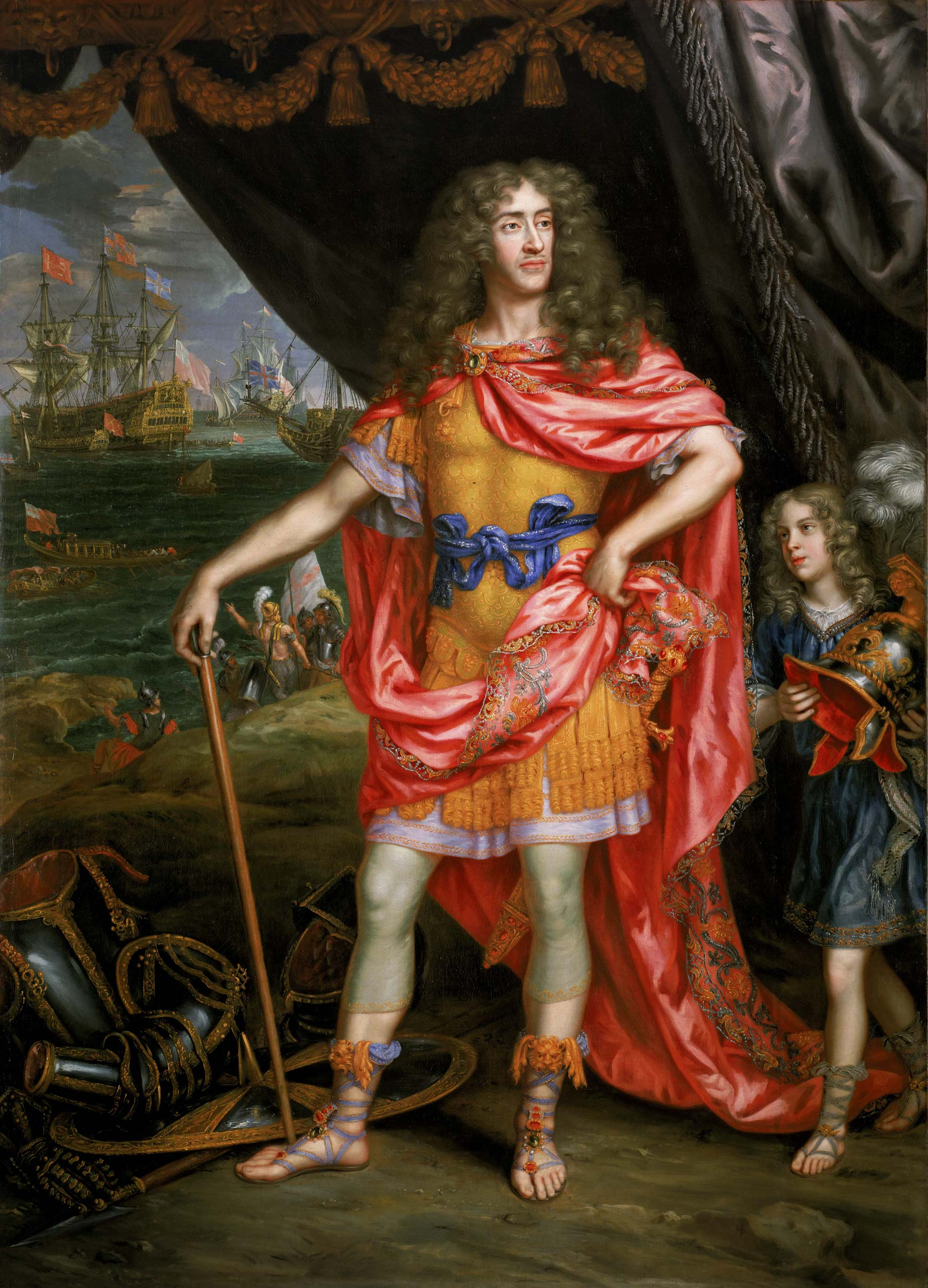
Portrait of James, Duke of York by Henri Gascar, 1673

As a political term, Tory was an insult (derived from the Middle Irish word tóraidhe, modern Irish tóraí, meaning "outlaw", "robber", from the Irish word tóir, meaning "pursuit" since outlaws were "pursued men") that entered English politics during the Exclusion Bill crisis of 1678–1681. Whig (from whiggamore, a "cattle driver") was initially a Scottish insult for the Covenanter faction in Scotland who opposed the Engagers (a faction who supported Charles I during the Second English Civil War) and supported the Whiggamore Raid that took place in September 1648. While the Whigs were those who supported the exclusion of James, the Duke of York from the succession to thrones of Scotland, England and Ireland (the Petitioners), the Tories were those who opposed the Exclusion Bill (the Abhorrers).

In 1757, David Hume wrote:

The court party reproached their antagonists with their affinity to the fanatical conventiclers in Scotland, who were known by the name of Whigs: The country party found a resemblance between the courtiers and the popish banditti in Ireland, to whom the appellation of Tory was affixed. And after this manner, these foolish terms of reproach came into public and general use; and even at present seem not nearer their end than when they were first invented.

== History ==
=== English Civil War ===
The first Tory party traces its principles and politics to the English Civil War which divided England between the Cavaliers (supporters of King Charles I) and the Roundheads (the supporters of the Long Parliament upon which the King had declared war). This action resulted from the Parliament not allowing him to levy taxes without yielding to its terms. At the beginning of the Long Parliament (1641), the King's supporters pursued a course of reform of previous abuses. The increasing radicalism of the Parliamentary majority, however, estranged many reformers even in the Parliament itself and drove them to make common cause with the King. The King's party was thus a mixture of supporters of royal autocracy and of those Parliamentarians who felt that the Long Parliament had gone too far in attempting to gain executive power for itself and, more specifically, in undermining the episcopalian government of the Church of England, which was felt to be a primary support of royal government. By the end of the 1640s, the radical Parliamentary programme had become clear: reduction of the King to a powerless figurehead and replacement of Anglican episcopacy with a form of Presbyterianism.

This prospective form of settlement was prevented by a coup d'état which shifted power from Parliament itself to the Parliamentary New Model Army, controlled by Oliver Cromwell. The Army had King Charles I executed and for the next 11 years the British kingdoms operated under military dictatorship. The Restoration of King Charles II produced a reaction in which the King regained a large part of the power held by his father. However, Charles' ministers and supporters in England accepted a substantial role for Parliament in the government of the kingdoms. No subsequent British monarch would attempt to rule without Parliament, and after the Glorious Revolution of 1688, political disputes would be resolved through elections and parliamentary manoeuvring, rather than by an appeal to force. Charles II also restored episcopacy in the Church of England. His first Cavalier Parliament began as a strongly royalist body, and passed a series of acts re-establishing the Church by law and strongly punishing dissent by both Roman Catholics and non-Anglican Protestants. These acts did not reflect the King's personal views and demonstrated the existence of a Royalist ideology beyond mere subservience to the Court.

A series of disasters in the late 1660s and 1670s discredited Charles II's governments, and powerful political interests (including some who had been identified with the Parliamentary side in the Civil War) began to agitate for a greater role of Parliament in government, coupled with more tolerance for Protestant dissenters. These interests would soon coalesce as the Whigs. As direct attacks on the King were politically impossible and could lead to execution for treason, opponents of the power of the Court framed their challenges as exposés of subversive and sinister Catholic plots. Although the matter of these plots was fictitious, they reflected two uncomfortable political realities: first, that Charles II had (somewhat insincerely) undertaken measures to convert the kingdom to Catholicism (in a 1670 treaty with Louis XIV of France); second, that his younger brother and heir presumptive, James, Duke of York, had in fact converted to Catholicism, an act that many Protestant Englishmen in the 1670s saw as only one step below high treason.

The Whigs tried to link the Lord Lieutenant of Ireland, the Duke of Ormonde, with the foremost Irish Tory, Redmond O'Hanlon, in a supposed plot to murder Titus Oates. The Whig Bishop of Meath, Henry Jones, offered O'Hanlon a pardon and a bribe if he would testify to Parliament that Ormonde was plotting a French invasion. In December 1680, the government seized these letters and the plan collapsed. In January 1681, the Whigs first began calling the supposed Irish plotters Tories, and on 15 February 1681 is recorded the first complaint from an English Royalist about the epithet Tory by the anti-Exclusion newspaper Heraclitus Ridens: "[T]hey call me scurvy names, Jesuit, Papish, Tory; and flap me over the mouth with their being the only True Protestants". Within a few months, anti-Exclusionists were calling themselves Tories and a northern Dissenter called Oliver Heywood recorded in October: "Ms. H. of Chesterfield told me a gentleman was at their house and had a red Ribband in his hat, she askt him what it meant, he said it signifyed that he was a Tory, whats that sd she, he ans. an Irish Rebel, — oh dreadful that any in England dare espouse that interest. I hear further since that this is the distinction they make instead of Cavalier and Roundhead, now they are called Torys and Wiggs".

=== The Exclusion Crisis and the Glorious Revolution ===
In a more general sense, the Tories (also known as the Court Party) represented the more conservative royalist supporters of Charles II, who endorsed a strong monarchy as a counterbalance to the power of Parliament, and who saw in the Whig opponents of the Court a quasi-Republican tendency (similar to that seen in the Long Parliament) to strip the monarchy of its essential prerogative powers and leave the Crown as a puppet entirely dependent upon Parliament. That the Exclusion Bill was the central question upon which parties diverged, did not hinge upon an assessment of the personal character of the Duke of York (though his conversion to Catholicism was the key factor that made the Bill possible), but rather upon the power of Parliament to elect a monarch of its own choosing, contrary to the established laws of succession. That the Parliament, with the consent of the King, had such power was not at issue; rather, it was the wisdom of a policy of creating a King whose sole title to the Crown was the will of Parliament and who was essentially a Parliamentary appointee.

On this original question, the Tories were in the short run entirely successful as the Parliaments that brought in the Exclusion Bill were dissolved, Charles II was enabled to manage the administration autocratically and upon his death the Duke of York succeeded without difficulty. The rebellion of Monmouth, the candidate of the radical Whigs to succeed Charles II, was easily crushed and Monmouth himself executed. However, in the long run Tory principles were to be severely compromised. Besides the support of a strong monarchy, the Tories also stood for the Church of England, as established in Acts of Parliament following the restoration of Charles II, both as a body governed by bishops, using the Book of Common Prayer whilst subscribing to a specific doctrine and also as an exclusive body established by law, from which both Roman Catholics and Nonconformists were excluded.

During his reign, James II fought for a broadly tolerant religious settlement under which his co-religionists could prosper—a position anathema to conservative Anglicans. James' attempts to use the government-controlled church to promote policies that undermined the church's own unique status in the state led some Tories to support the Glorious Revolution of 1688. The result was a King established solely by parliamentary title and subject to legal controls established by Parliament, the principles that the Tories had originally abhorred. The Tories' sole consolation was that the monarchs chosen were close to the main line of succession as William III was James II's nephew and William's wife Mary was James's elder daughter. The Act of Toleration 1689 also gave rights to Protestant dissenters that were hitherto unknown, while the elimination of a large number of bishops who refused to swear allegiance to the new monarchs allowed the government to pack the episcopate with bishops with decidedly Whiggish leanings. In both these respects the Tory platform had failed, but the institutions of monarchy and of a state Church survived.

=== Balanced ministries and opposition ===
Despite the failure of their founding principles, the Tories remained a powerful political party during the reigns of the next two monarchs, particularly that of Queen Anne. During this time, the Tories fiercely competed with the Whigs for power, and there were frequent Parliamentary elections in which the two parties measured their strength. William III saw that the Tories were generally more friendly to royal authority than the Whigs, and he employed both groups in his government. His early ministry was largely Tory, but the government gradually came to be dominated by the so-called Junto Whigs. This tight-knit political grouping was opposed by the Country Whigs led by Robert Harley, who gradually merged with the Tory opposition in the later 1690s. Although William's successor Anne had considerable Tory sympathies and excluded the Junto Whigs from power, after a brief and unsuccessful experiment with an exclusively Tory government she generally continued William's policy of balancing the parties, supported by her moderate Tory ministers, the Duke of Marlborough and Lord Godolphin.

The stresses of the War of the Spanish Succession which begun in 1701 led most of the Tories to withdraw into opposition by 1708, so that Marlborough and Godolphin were heading an administration dominated by the Junto Whigs. Anne herself grew increasingly uncomfortable with this dependence on the Whigs, especially as her personal relationship with the Duchess of Marlborough deteriorated. This situation also became increasingly uncomfortable to many of the non-Junto Whigs, led by the Duke of Somerset and the Duke of Shrewsbury, who began to intrigue with Robert Harley's Tories. In early 1710, the prosecution by the Whig government of the ultra-Tory preacher Henry Sacheverell for sermons delivered the previous year, led to the Sacheverell riots and brought the ministry into popular discredit. In the spring of 1710, Anne dismissed Godolphin and the Junto ministers, replacing them with Tories.

The new Tory ministry was dominated by Harley, Chancellor of the Exchequer (later Lord Treasurer) and Viscount Bolingbroke, Secretary of State. They were backed by a strong majority in the Parliament elected in 1710, rallying under the banner of "Church in Danger". This Tory government negotiated the Treaty of Utrecht in 1713, which pulled Great Britain out of the War of the Spanish Succession (to the dismay of Britain's allies, including Anne's eventual successor, George, Elector of Hanover); the peace was enacted despite a Whig majority in the House of Lords, which Anne defeated by creating new Tory peers. Following a long disagreement between the ministers, Anne dismissed Harley in 1714. The arch-Tory Bolingbroke became in effect Anne's chief minister and Tory power seemed to be at its zenith. However, Anne was extremely ill and died within a few days. Bolingbroke had not been able to formulate any coherent plans for dealing with the succession, for if he thought of proclaiming the son of James II (the Pretender) king, he made no moves to do so. The Elector George succeeded to the throne entirely peacefully, supported by the Hanoverian Tory grouping.

=== Proscription and the Whig supremacy ===
In accordance with Succession to the Crown Act 1707, the Queen's government was replaced by a Council of Regency until the new King should arrive from Hanover. Bolingbroke offered his services to the King but was coldly rejected; George I brought in a government composed entirely of Whigs, and the new Parliament, elected from January to May 1715, had a large Whig majority. In December 1714 Lord Carnarvon wrote that "hardly one Tory is left in any place, though never so mean a one". The historian Eveline Cruickshanks stated that "[w]hat took place in 1715 was not a change to an all-Whig ministry, it was a whole social revolution". For the first time, Tory gentlemen could no longer employ their sons, as they traditionally had done, in public offices such as the Army, Navy, civil service and the Church. Tory officers in the Army had their commissions taken away, Tory lawyers could not now become judges or K.C.s. The predominantly Tory lower Anglican clergy could no longer become bishops and Tory merchants were refused government contracts or directorships in any major company. This proscription lasted for forty-five years. George Lyttelton wrote in his Letter to the Tories (1747):

We are kept out of all public employments of power and profit, and live like aliens and pilgrims in the land of our nativity; [...] no quality, no fortune, no eloquence, no learning, no wisdom, no probity is of any use to any man of our unfortunate denomination, ecclesiastic or layman, lawyer or soldier, peer or commoner, for obtaining the most deserved advancement in his profession, or any favour of the Crown; whilst, to our additional and insupportable vexation, the bare merit of hating us, and everything we love and hold sacred, daily advances dunces in the law and church, cowards in our fleets and armies, republicans in the King's house, and idiots everywhere!

The Whig government, backed by royal favour and controlling the levers of power, was able to maintain a series of majorities through the infrequent elections of the next several decades (only 7 in the 46 years of the first two Georges, as opposed to 11 in the 26 years from the Revolution to the death of Queen Anne). For much of the period, the Tories commanded a broad base of support in rural England, but the relatively undemocratic nature of the franchise and the maldistribution of the borough seats ensured that this popular appeal was never translated into a Tory majority in Parliament. The Tories would have won every general election between 1715 and 1747 had the number of seats obtained corresponded to the number of votes cast. The Tories were, therefore, an effectively null factor in practical politics, a permanent minority in Parliament and entirely excluded from government. The latter exclusion, and the rigid party politics played by the Whigs, played a significant role in the cohesion of the Tories; the Whigs offered few opportunities for Tories who switched sides, and as a party the Tories found no possibilities for compromise with the Whigs.

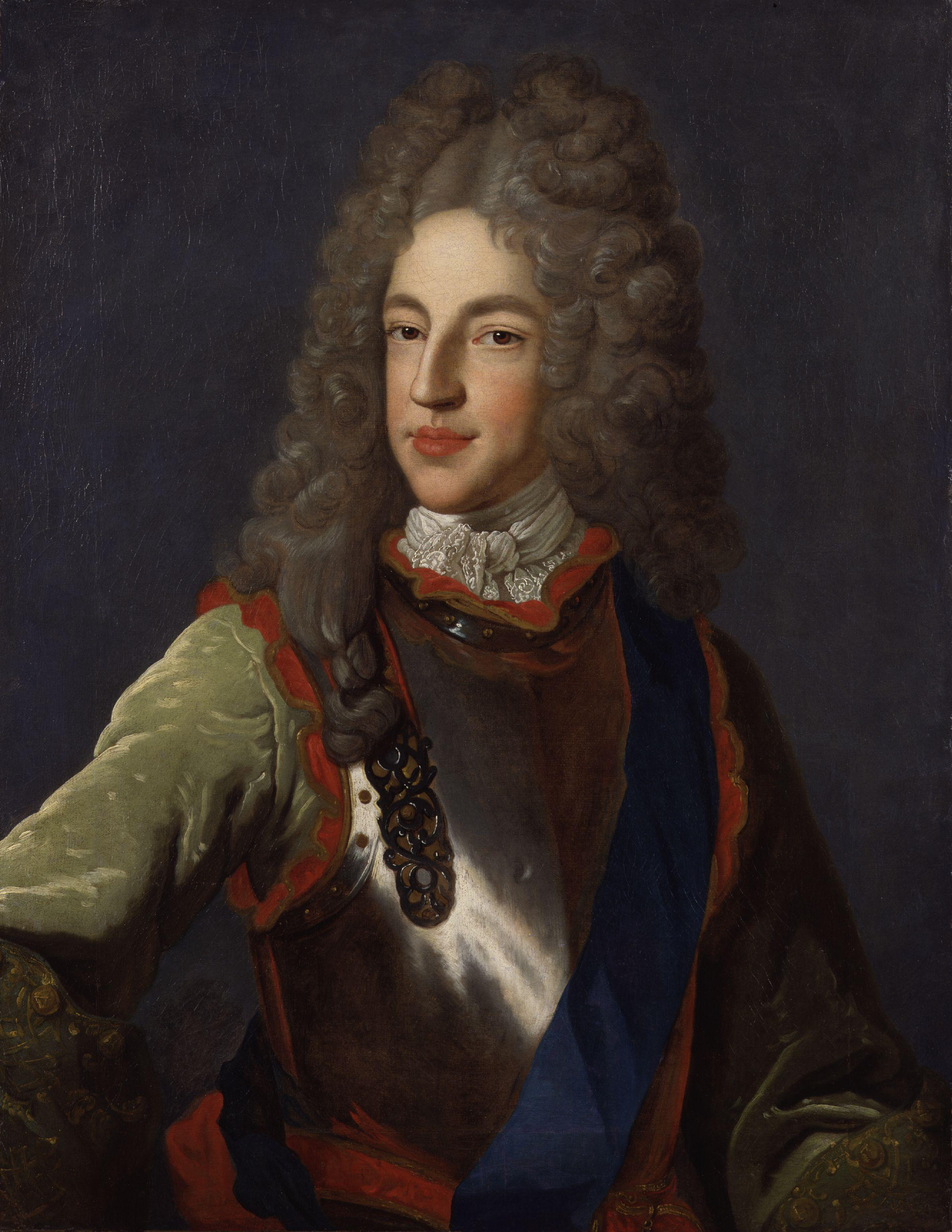
James Stuart, the Pretender during the Jacobite rising of 1715, by gaining some Tory support it was thus used to discredit them by the Whigs

The proscription of the Tories alienated them from the Hanoverian regime and converted many of them to Jacobitism. In 1709, the Duke of Beaufort had founded the High Tory and crypto-Jacobite Loyal Brotherhood, which grew in influence after proscription. Bolingbroke later wrote: "If milder measures had been pursued, certain it is that the Tories had never universally embraced Jacobitism. The violence of the Whigs forced them into the arms of the Pretender". In October 1714, the French ambassador Charles-François d'Iberville noted that the number of Jacobites in the Tory party was increasing and in early 1715 he wrote that the Tories seemed to be "heading for civil war which they regard as their only resort". The former Tory chief minister, Lord Oxford, was impeached and sent to the Tower, with Bolingbroke and the Tory peer the Duke of Ormonde fleeing to France to join the Pretender. A series of riots against the coronation of George I and the new Hanoverian-Whig regime (in which the mob voiced their support for Jacobitism and local Tory parliamentary candidates) led to the Whig government strengthening their power by passing the Riot Act, suspending habeas corpus and increasing the army (including by importing 6,000 Dutch troops).

Louis XIV had promised them arms but no troops, as France was exhausted by war, despite Bolingbroke's claim that just one-tenth of the number of troops William of Orange brought with him in 1688 would have sufficed. However, this promise of arms disappeared when Louis died in September 1715. The conspirators intended to abandon the rising they had planned for the West Country, but the Scots forced their hand by unilaterally raising the Pretender's standard. One of Ormonde's agents betrayed the plans for an English rising and subsequently the government arrested many Tory MPs, ex MPs and peers. The subsequent Jacobite rebellion of 1715–16 resulted in failure. However, Charles XII of Sweden was willing to aid the English Tories by sending troops to put the Pretender on the throne, in conjunction with an English rising. Lord Oxford, who had already in 1716 offered the Pretender his services, directed the Swedish Plot from the Tower. In January 1717, the government discovered this plot and won a vote of credit for defence measures against the projected invasion in the Commons against Tory opposition. Charles' death in 1718 ended hopes from that quarter and Ormonde's planned Spanish invasion was destroyed by a storm at sea.

During the Whig Split of 1717, the Tories refused to back either side and adopted the same stance to Lord Sunderland's overtures in 1720. Nonetheless, their combined efforts helped the opposition win some victories, such as the defeat of the Peerage Bill in 1719. In 1722, Sunderland advised the King to admit leading Tories into government, thereby dividing them and ending their hopes for revenge by looking for support from abroad. He also advised the King in Cabinet that elections to Parliament should be free from government bribery, an idea Sir Robert Walpole opposed due to the possibility of the election of a Tory Parliament. The King was also opposed: "King George stared the Earl of Sunderland in the face at the name of a Tory Parliament, for it seems nothing is so hideous and frightful to him as a Tory". The public outcry over the South Sea Bubble led the Tories to believe that it would not be worthwhile raising funds for the general election, as they considered a Jacobite rising would be successful considering the state of public opinion.

Sunderland joined the Tories in the Atterbury Plot, in which the Pretender was to be put on the throne. A rising was planned for each county, assisted by Irish and Spanish troops. However, Sunderland's death in April 1722 led to the government discovering the plot and it subsequently collapsed. When the Commons voted on the bill of pains and penalties against Atterbury, nearly ninety per cent of Tory MPs voted against it. Although the Whig Prime Minister Robert Walpole decided not to prosecute those Tories that he knew were involved in the plot, the Tories were demoralised and largely absented themselves from Parliament for a time. Upon the accession of George II in 1727 and the ensuing general election, the Tories were reduced to 128 MPs, their lowest total up to this point. Edward Harley established the Cocoa Tree Club to protect the interests of the landed gentry in the face of this political challenge.

The Tories were divided over whether to cooperate with the opposition Whigs against Walpole, with those in favour consisting of the Hanoverian faction led by Sir William Wyndham and with those opposed making up the Jacobite faction headed by William Shippen. Most Tories opposed voting with the opposition Whigs, only reversing this stance when the Pretender sent a letter to the Tories in 1730, ordering them to "unite in the measures against the Government and even with those who oppose it for different views than theirs". For the next decade, the Tories cooperated with the opposition Whigs against Walpole. Public admission of Jacobitism was treason, so the Tories challenged the Hanoverian-Whig regime without specifically addressing it by developing a rhetoric borrowed from the Whigs of the Exclusion Crisis; they denounced government corruption and the high taxation needed to spend on foreign entanglements, opposed the growth of the Army and denounced "tyranny" and "arbitrary power". In a speech on the Army estimates, Walpole claimed that "No man of common prudence will profess himself openly a Jacobite; by so doing he not only may injure his private fortune, but he must render himself less able to do any effectual service to the cause he has embraced...Your right Jacobite, Sir, disguises his true sentiments, he roars out for revolution principles; he pretends to be a great friend to liberty". He further claimed that a large Army was needed to defeat any possible Jacobite invasion.

In 1737, Frederick, Prince of Wales applied to Parliament for an increased allowance. This split the Tories, with 45 abstaining, leading to the motion being defeated by 30 votes. Bolingbroke, who wanted to dissociate the Tories from Jacobitism, denounced this as "the absurd behaviour of the Tories, which no experience can cure". In 1738 Frederick's attempts to reconcile with the Tories broke down on Wyndham's insistence that he join the Tories in favouring a reduced Army.With the outbreak of war against Spain in 1739, there was renewed plotting amongst Tories for a Jacobite rising. Wyndham's death in 1740 led to the breakdown of the coalition between the Tories and opposition Whigs. An opposition Whig motion for Walpole's dismissal was defeated by 290 to 106, with many Tories abstaining. At the general election of 1741, there were 136 Tories elected.

The Tories resumed their cooperation with the opposition Whigs after receiving another letter from the Pretender in September 1741, ordering them to "pursue vigorous and unanimous measures in the next session of Parliament. [...] They will probably have many occasions of greatly distressing the present Government and ministry and perhaps find some who will concur with them in that, though not out of goodwill to my cause. [...] In such cases I hope my friends will make no scruples in joining heartily with them for whatever their particular motives may be anything that tends to the disadvantage of the present Government and to the bringing it into confusion cannot be but of advantage to my cause". As a result, 127 Tories joined the opposition Whigs in successfully voting against Walpole's nominated chairman of the elections committee in December 1741. The Tories continued to vote against Walpole with the opposition Whigs in subsequent divisions until Walpole was forced to resign in February 1742. The Pretender wrote to the Tories afterwards, declaring: "I cannot delay any longer expressing to you my satisfaction at the late behaviour of my friends in Parliament, and I take it as a great mark of their singular regard for what I wrote to you some months ago".

In 1743, war broke out between Britain and France, as part of the larger War of the Austrian Succession. Later that year Francis Sempill, the Pretender's representative at the French court, carried a message from English Tories to the French Secretary of State for Foreign Affairs (Jean-Jacques Amelot de Chaillou) requesting French help for a Stuart restoration (including 10,000 French soldiers). It was signed by the Duke of Beaufort (one of the four richest people in Britain), Lord Barrymore, Lord Orrery, Sir Watkin Williams Wynn, Sir John Hynde Cotton and Sir Robert Abdy. Amelot replied that the French government would need considerable proof of English support for Jacobitism before it could act.

James Butler, Louis XV's Master of Horse, toured England ostensibly for purchasing bloodstock but in reality to gauge the health of Jacobitism in England, visiting leading Tories. Before he left for England. the French king briefed him personally to assure Tory leaders that all of their demands would be met. In November 1743 Amelot told Sempill officially that Louis XV was resolved to restore the House of Stuart and that he was planning a French invasion headed by the Pretender's son, Charles Edward Stuart. The "Declaration of King James" (written by Tory leaders) was signed by the Pretender on 23 December. This was to be published in the event of a successful French landing. However, the Whig government was informed by a spy of the intended French invasion and King George told Parliament on 15 February 1744 that a French invasion was planned, assisted by "disaffected persons from this country". The House of Commons passed a loyal address by 287 to 123. The Tories' insistence for the House to divide on this occasion seemed to the government a design by the Tories "to show the French what numbers in the House they might depend on". The Tories also opposed increasing the armed forces, it being noted "that none of the leaders amongst the Tories, either on this occasion or that of the King's first message, showed the least sign of zeal or affection to the Government".

On 24 February, a storm scattered the French invasion fleet and suspected Jacobites were arrested, leading to the French government cancelling their planned invasion. Charles Stuart, who was still in France and determined to start a Jacobite rising, looked to Scotland. However, the English Tories would only support a rising in Scotland if accompanied by a French invasion near London to aid the English Tories in their own rising. The English Tories repeatedly told the Jacobite court that only regular soldiers invading at the same time as their rising could achieve a Stuart restoration.

In December 1744, the Broadbottom Administration was formed, which included a handful of Tories in minor offices. Some other Tories were offered places, but those serving for Jacobite counties "could not hazard a new election and therefore decline[d] the acceptance of them". One of the Tories who accepted office, Sir John Cotton, did not swear the oath of loyalty to King George and informed the French King that he still favoured a Jacobite French invasion; he added that the Tories in office would try to ensure that more British soldiers were sent to Flanders from England in order to help a French invasion. After Lord Gower took office in this government, the Tories no longer looked to him as their leader as Lyttleton wrote that "when it was discovered that Gower was really a friend to the Hanover succession, the Tories discarded him for being their leader, and adopted a determined Jacobite the Duke of Beaufort in his stead". In June 1745, the Tory leaders in the Commons, Wynn and Cotton (together with Beaufort), informed the Jacobite court that "if the Prince [Charles] lands in present circumstances with ten battalions or even smaller body of troops there will be no opposition". Tory leaders sent Robert MacCarty to France with a request for 10,000 troops and 30,000 arms to be landed in England, where they would join them upon arrival.

Charles travelled to Scotland in July without consulting the Tories or the French and without a sizeable body of troops. After his landing, Sempill wrote: "The City of London, Sir John Hynde Cotton, Lord Barrymore, the Duke of Beaufort, and all the English cry loudly and vehemently for a body of troops to be landed near London, as the most effectual means to support the Prince". They could not rise for the Prince without "a body of troops to support them", but they "would join the Prince if His Highness could force his way to them". Throughout the Jacobite rising of 1745, Charles could not establish contact with the English Tories. Captain Nagle, who had visited a peer in London, reported in December that they were all being monitored by the government, but that they would declare for Charles if he made his way to London or if the French invaded. However, Charles retreated from England and the French never landed, so the English Tories did not feel safe in coming out for the Pretender. After the collapse of the rising, Charles' captured secretary, John Murray of Broughton, informed the government of the Tories' conspiracy with the Pretender. The government decided not to prosecute them. The trial of the Scottish rebel lords in London was boycotted by most Tory peers. After the Duke of Cumberland's brutal suppression of the Scots, English Tories adopted the plaid as their symbol.

Eveline Cruickshanks in her study of the 1715–1754 Tory party for The History of Parliament, stated that "the available evidence leaves no doubt that up to 1745 the Tories were a predominantly Jacobite party, engaged in attempts to restore the Stuarts by a rising with foreign assistance". Sir Lewis Namier noticed that for the reigns of George I and George II, Tory family papers are non-existent. As papers from before 1715 and after 1760 survive, Cruickshanks contends that these families were hiding their Jacobite leanings by destroying incriminating papers. A nineteenth-century historian who had examined many collections such as these, claimed that it was "the custom in Jacobite days to destroy all letters with any hint of political or religious feeling in them". However, some historians (such as Linda Colley) have questioned the Tories' commitment to Jacobitism. In 2016, Frank O'Gorman noted that given the nature of the evidence, it is unlikely that the question will ever be answered, but added that "judged by the acid test of how they behaved in the '15 and '45 most Tories showed themselves to be Hanoverian and not Jacobite".

In 1747, Prince Frederick invited the Tories "to unite and coalesce with him" and declared his intention that when he became King, he would "abolish...all distinction of the party" and put an end to the proscription of the Tories. A meeting of leading Tories (including Beaufort, Wynn and Cotton) accepted the Prince's offer and replied assuring him of their support for his "wise and salutary purposes". However, they refused to pledge themselves to a coalition with Whigs. The 1747 general election resulted in only 115 Tory MPs being elected, their lowest figure up until this point. After Jacobite riots in Oxford in 1748, the government wanted to give the King the power to nominate the Chancellor of the University of Oxford, which was considered a hotbed of Jacobitism and Toryism. Thomas Carte wrote to the Pretender that "the attempt against the university of Oxford brought them all up at once to town, which nothing else would, and in their zeal on that account, they entered into a sort of coalition with Prince Frederick's party to stand by the university of Oxford, to join in opposing all unconstitutional points, but to be under no obligation to visit Prince Frederick's court, nor unite in other points".

After Wynn's death in 1749, a Jacobite agent reported to the Pretender that the Tory party was "without a head", dispirited and frightened. In 1751 Frederick died, followed in 1752 by Cotton. This effectively ended opposition in Parliament for the rest of the session. Horace Walpole, in his memoirs for 1764, wrote of the decline of the Tory party:

Hitherto it might be said that the two parties of Whig and Tory still subsisted; though Jacobitism, the concealed mother of the latter, was extinct...The subsequent contests were rather a struggle for power than the settled animosity of two parties, though the body of Opposition still called itself Whig, an appellation rather dropped than disclaimed by the Court; and though the real Tories still adhered to their own distinctions while they secretly favoured, sometimes opposed, the Court, and fluctuated accordingly as they esteemed particular chiefs not of their connection or had the more agreeable opportunity of distressing those who supported the cause of freedom. As their whole conduct was comprised in silent votes, and never was considerable enough to turn a single scale in the political changes, I shall seldom mention them anymore.

=== Friends of Mr Pitt ===
Dickinson reports the following:

All historians are agreed that the Tory party declined sharply in the late 1740s and 1750s and that it ceased to be an organized party by 1760. The research of Sir Lewis Namier and his disciples [...] has convinced all historians that there were no organized political parties in Parliament between the late 1750s and the early 1780s. Even the Whigs ceased to be an identifiable party, and Parliament was dominated by competing political connections, which all proclaimed Whiggish political views, or by independent backbenchers unattached to any particular group.

Upon the accession of George III, the old political distinctions dissolved. The Whig factions became in effect distinct parties (such as the Grenvillites and the Bedfordites), all of whom claimed the Whig mantle, while the material distinction in politics was between the "King's Friends" who supported the newly activist role of George III in government, and those who opposed the king. The proscription on the employment of Tories in government offices ended, which resulted in the Tories dividing into several factions and ceasing to function as a coherent political party. Sentimental Toryism remained, as in the writings of Samuel Johnson, but in politics "Tory" was little more than an unfriendly epithet for politicians closely identified with George III. The label "Tory" was in this sense applied to the Prime Ministers Lord Bute (1762–1763) and Lord North (1770–1782), but these politicians considered themselves Whigs. In his study of the debates in Parliament for 1768–1774, PDG Thomas discovered that not a single politician labelled themselves a Tory. JCD Clark similarly argues: "The history of the Tory party in parliament between the early 1760s and the late 1820s may be simply written: it did not exist".

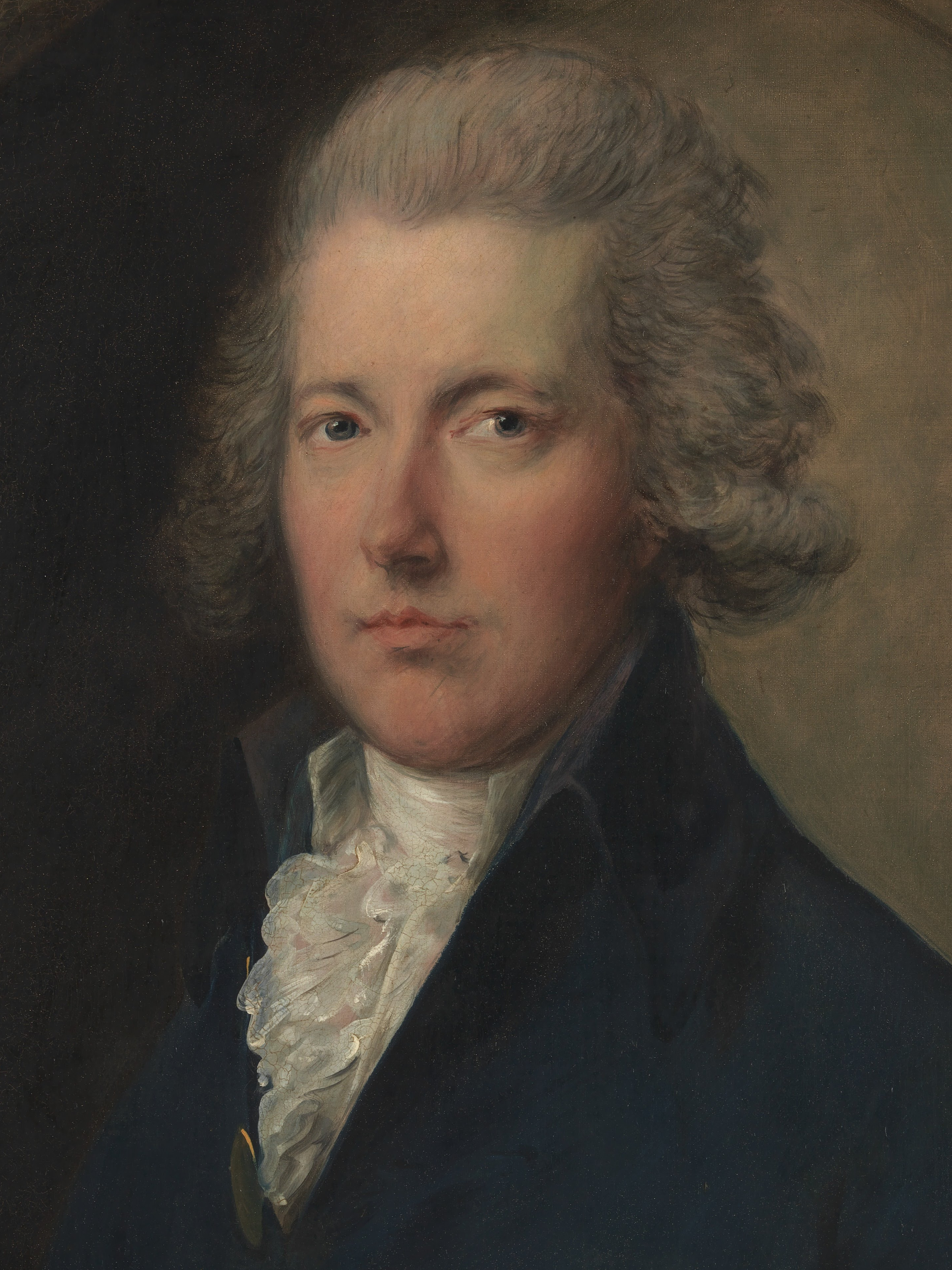
William Pitt the Younger

Applied by their opponents to parliamentary supporters of the younger William Pitt (1783–1801, 1804–1806), the term Tories came to represent the political current opposed to the Old Whigs and the radicalism unleashed by the American and French Revolutions. This was reinforced by the breakup of the Whig party in 1794 when the conservative group led by the Duke of Portland joined Pitt's ministry, leaving an opposition rump led by Charles James Fox. The historian JCD Clark has written of the 1790s: "It cannot be too clearly stressed that no public figure at that date accepted the title 'Tory', and that they had the best reasons for denying its appropriateness". Pitt rejected the Tory label, preferring to refer to himself as an independent Whig, for he believed in the current constitutional arrangement as being well balanced, without particular favour towards the royal prerogative, unlike the Tories of the first half of the 18th century.

=== The "Tory Party" ===
Most historians use the term "Tory party" to identify the weakly organized group surrounding Pitt the Younger which came to be the dominant force in British politics from 1783 until 1830. The term was avoided by the members themselves. After Pitt's death (1806), the ministers in the Portland ministry (1807–1809) called themselves the "Friends of Mr Pitt" rather than Tories. Portland's successor, Spencer Perceval (Prime Minister, 1809–1812), never adopted the label of Tory and, after his assassination in 1812, the members of the government of Lord Liverpool (1812–1827) firmly rejected it in a ministerial memorandum to the Prince Regent:

It is almost unnecessary to observe that the British Government had for more than a century been and could only be a Whig Government; and that the present administration is, as every administration in this country must necessarily be, a Whig administration. For a Whig Government means now, as it has all along meant, nothing else than a Government established by laws equally binding upon the King and the subject.

From this historians analysis, generally, the Tories were associated with lesser gentry, the Church of England and the Episcopal Church in Scotland while Whigs were more associated with trade, money, larger land holders or land magnates and the Nonconformist Protestant churches. Both were still committed to the political system in place at that time. The new Tory party was distinct both in composition and ideological orientation from the old. It consisted largely of former Whigs, alienated from the party that now bore that name. While it maintained a sentimental and conservative respect for the symbolic institutions of the British monarchy, in practice Tory ministries allowed the King no more freedom than Whig ones. The incompetence of George III's personal interventions in policy had been sufficiently shown in the American War (1775–1783), henceforward his active role was limited to negations of government policies such as the Catholic emancipation. In foreign policy, the differences were even more marked as the old Tory party had been pacifist and isolationist whereas the new one was bellicose and imperialistic.

=== Conservative Party ===
The Tories became associated with repression of popular discontent after 1815, but the Tories later underwent a fundamental transformation under the influence of Robert Peel, who was an industrialist rather than a landowner. Peel in his 1834 Tamworth Manifesto outlined a new conservative philosophy of reforming ills while conserving the good. The subsequent Peel administrations have been labelled Conservative rather than Tory, but the older term remains in use.

When the Conservative Party split in 1846 on the issue of free trade (namely, the repeal of the Corn Laws), the protectionist wing of the party rejected the Conservative label. They preferred to be known as Protectionists or even to revive the older Tory as an official name. By 1859 the Peelites (Peel's Conservative supporters) joined the Whigs and Radicals to form the Liberal Party. The remaining Tories, under the leadership of the Earl of Derby (a former Whig) and Disraeli (once a Radical candidate for Parliament), adopted the Conservative label as the official name of their party.

== Electoral performance ==
First Tories

Election	Leader	Seats	+/–	Position	Government
1661	Sir Edward Hyde	379 / 513	▲379	▲1st	Majority
March 1679	John Ernle	137 / 513	▼241	▼2nd	Minority
October 1679	John Ernle	210 / 513	▲73	2nd	Minority
1681	Charles II of England	193 / 513	▼27	2nd	Minority
1685	James II of England	468 / 513	▲275	▲1st	Majority
1689	The Marquess of Carmarthen	232 / 513	▼236	▼2nd	Minority
1690	The Marquess of Carmarthen	243 / 513	▲7	▲1st	Minority
1695		203 / 513	▼40	▼2nd	Minority
1698		208 / 513	▲5	2nd	Minority
January 1701		249 / 513	▲41	▲1st	Minority
November 1701		240 / 513	▼9	▼2nd	Minority
1702	The Earl of Godolphin and The Duke of Marlborough	298 / 513	▲58	▲1st	Majority
1705	The Duke of Marlborough	260 / 513	▼38	1st	Majority
1708	The Earl of Godolphin	222 / 558	▼38	▼2nd	Minority
1710	Robert Harley	346 / 558	▲124	▲1st	Majority
1713	Robert Harley	369 / 558	▲23	1st	Majority
1715	The Viscount Bolingbroke	217 / 558	▼152	▼2nd	Minority
1722	Sir William Wyndham	169 / 558	▼48	2nd	Minority
1727	The Viscount Bolingbroke	128 / 558	▼41	2nd	Minority
1734	The Viscount Bolingbroke	145 / 558	▲17	2nd	Minority
1741	Sir Watkin Williams-Wynn	136 / 558	▼9	2nd	Minority
1747	Sir Watkin Williams-Wynn	117 / 558	▼19	2nd	Minority
1754	No leader	106 / 558	▼11	2nd	Minority
1761	No leader	112 / 558	▲6	2nd	Minority

- Note that the results for 1661–1708 are England only.

Second Tories

Election	Leader	Seats	+/–	Position	Government
1774	Lord North	343 / 558	–	–	Majority
1780	Lord North	260 / 558	▼83	1st	Majority
1784	William Pitt the Younger	280 / 558	▲20	1st	Majority
1790	William Pitt the Younger	340 / 558	▲60	1st	Majority
1796	William Pitt the Younger	424 / 558	▲84	1st	Majority
1802	Henry Addington	383 / 658	▼41	1st	Majority
1806	The Duke of Portland	228 / 658	▼155	▼2nd	Minority
1807	The Duke of Portland	216 / 658	▼12	▲1st	Majority
1812	The Earl of Liverpool	400 / 658	▲12	1st	Majority
1818	The Earl of Liverpool	280 / 658	▼120	1st	Majority
1820	The Earl of Liverpool	341 / 658	▲61	1st	Majority
1826	The Earl of Liverpool	428 / 658	▲87	1st	Majority
1830	The Duke of Wellington	250 / 658	▼178	1st	Minority
1831	The Duke of Wellington	235 / 658	▼15	▼2nd	Minority
1832	The Duke of Wellington	175 / 658	▼60	2nd	Minority
