= Exclusion Crisis =

Crisis of succession England, 1679–1681

The Exclusion Crisis ran from 1679 until 1681 in the reign of King Charles II of England, Scotland and Ireland. Three Exclusion Bills sought to exclude the King's brother and heir presumptive, James, Duke of York, from the thrones of England, Scotland and Ireland because he was a Roman Catholic. None became law. Two new parties formed. The Tories were opposed to this exclusion, while the "Country Party", who were soon to be called the Whigs, supported it. While the matter of James's exclusion was not decided in Parliament during Charles's reign, it would come to a head only three years after James took the throne, when he was deposed in the Glorious Revolution of 1688. Finally, the Act of Settlement 1701 decided definitively that Roman Catholics were to be excluded from the English, Scottish, and Irish thrones, later the British throne.

== Background ==
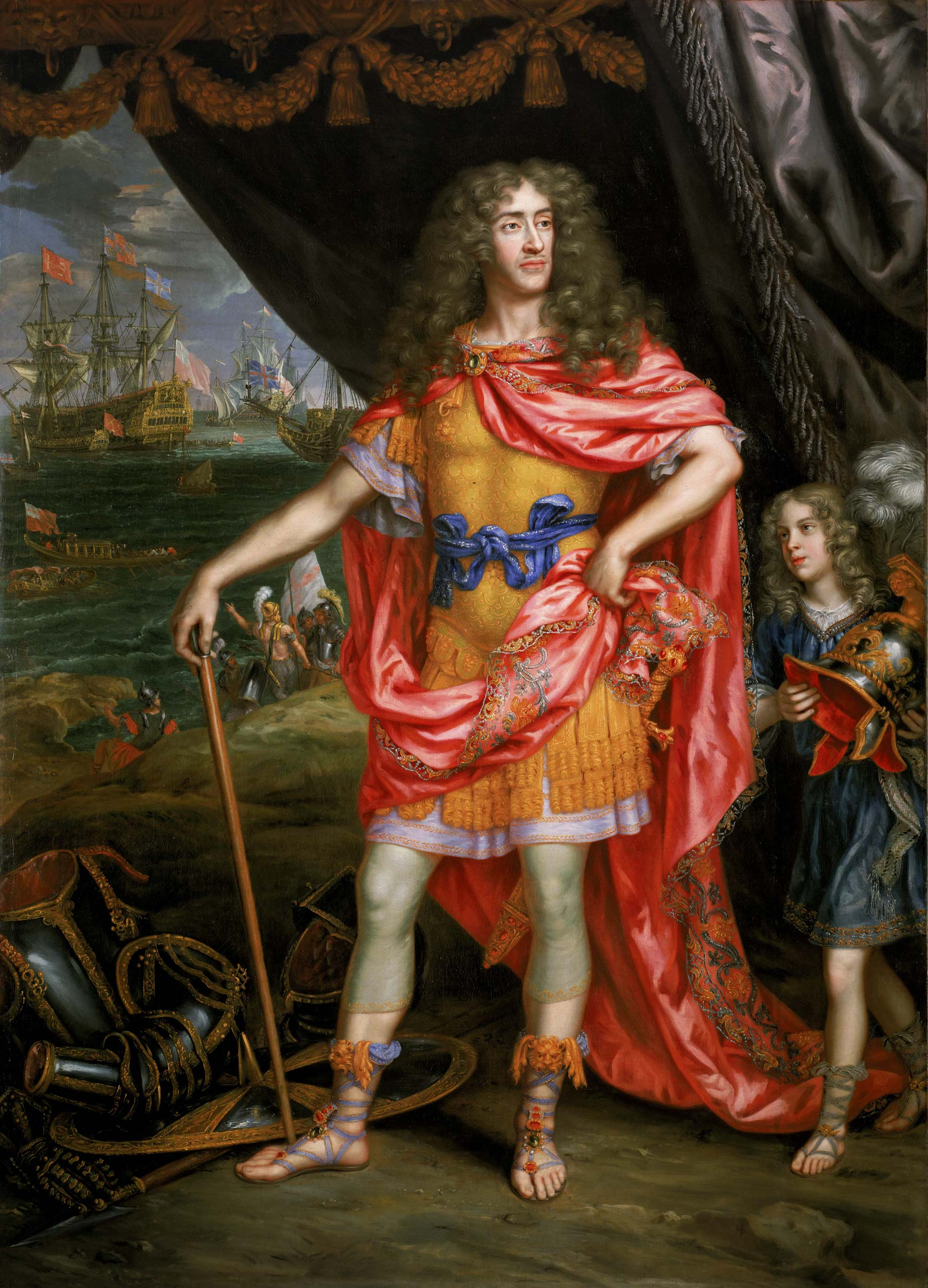
c. 1673 portrait of the Duke of York by Henri Gascar

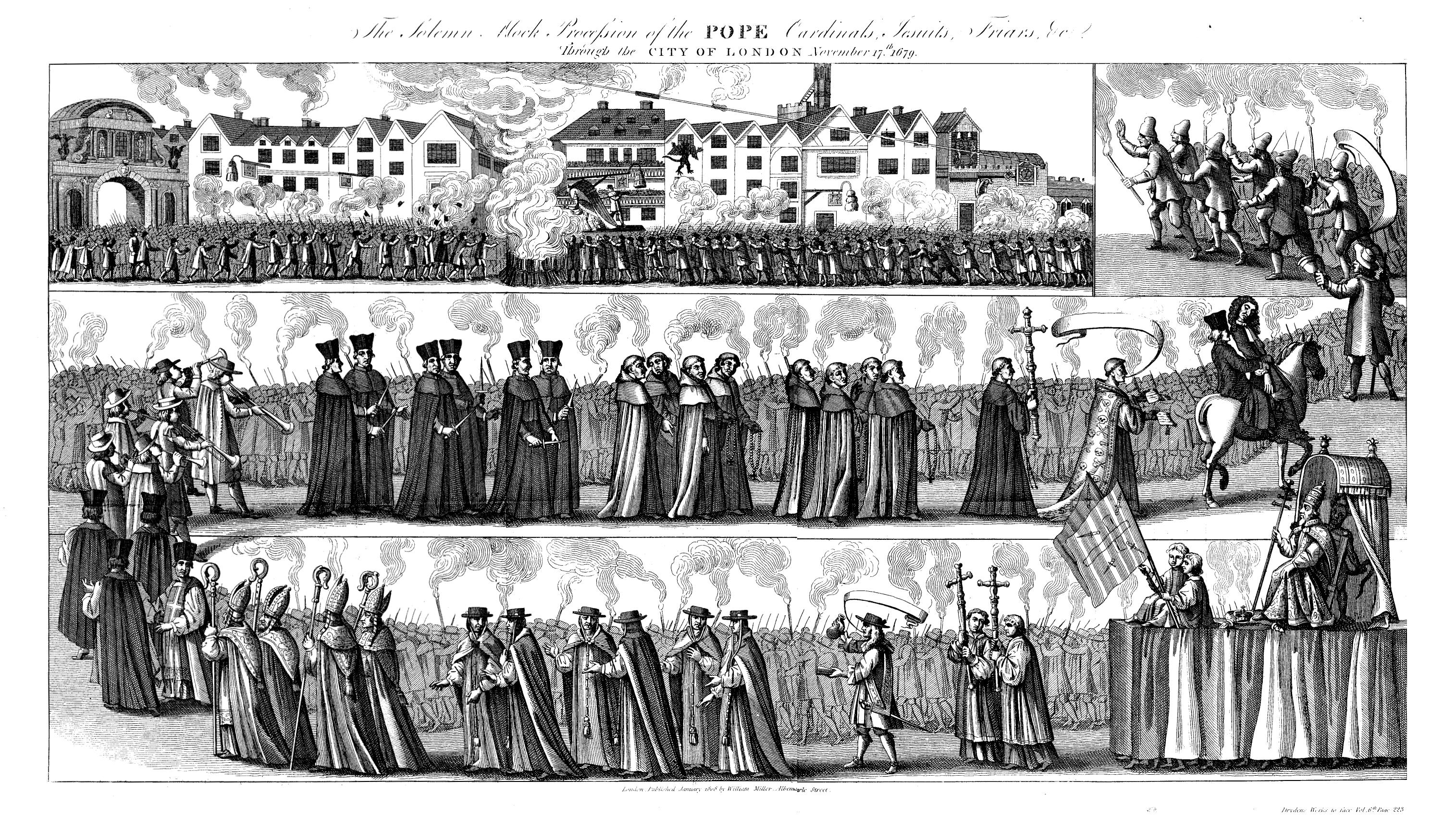
Engraving showing "A Solemn Mock Procession of the Pope" held in London on 17 November 1680. The Whigs arranged to have effigies of the Pope, cardinals, friars, and nuns paraded through the streets of the City of London and then burned in a large bonfire.

In 1673, when the Duke of York refused to take the oath prescribed by the new Test Act, it became publicly known that he was a Roman Catholic. In the five years that followed, growing concern regarding the shift towards the king and court's pro-French stance and perceived emulation of its Catholicism and arbitrary ('absolute') behaviour, led to growing opposition amongst some politicians and peers in Parliament. Between 1675 and 1678, the First Earl of Shaftesbury for example, highlighted in print and in the House of Lords the dangers of arbitrary government and adherence to Rome of Parliament, the nation, the rule of law, and the English rights and liberties. This concern was exacerbated by the discovery of the Duke of York's new religious affiliation and by the Secret Treaty of Dover (1670).

In 1678, during the Popish Plot, the Duke of York's secretary, Edward Colman, was named by Titus Oates as a conspirator to subvert the kingdom. Members of the Anglican English establishment could see that, in France, the Roman Catholic king Louis XIV was ruling in an absolutist way, and a movement gathered strength to avoid such a form of monarchy from developing in England, as many feared it would if James were to succeed his brother Charles, who had no legitimate children. Sir Henry Capel summarised the general feeling of the country when he said in a parliamentary debate in the House of Commons of England on 27 April 1679:

From popery came the notion of a standing army and arbitrary power... Formerly the crown of Spain, and now France, supports this root of popery amongst us; but lay popery flat, and there's an end of arbitrary government and power. It is a mere chimera, or notion, without popery.

== Crises ==
The impeachment of Thomas Osborne, Earl of Danby, for use as a scapegoat for a scandal by which Louis XIV bought the neutrality of Charles's government with an outright bribe, caused anti-Catholic sentiments in parliament to boil over, resulting in a parliamentary push to exclude James from the throne. Though Danby had, for many years, been using his power as Lord Treasurer to attempt to divert the King away from a pro-France foreign policy, his effort to gain funds for the crown achieved the opposite, while bringing the ire of the parliament down upon him. In late 1677, Danby persuaded Charles to raise an army to threaten the French into paying them off to avoid an English incursion into the Franco-Dutch War. However, when news of the French victory against the Dutch at Ghent reached the Commons in February 1678, a motion was passed to address the King for an immediate war with France, despite the fact that parliament had granted no supply and had stopped the lucrative trade across the Channel. All too aware that the King lacked sufficient funds, Danby was forced into accepting a secret French proposal to give Charles money in return for an alliance.

The letters confirming the secret proposal acceptance were later captured by other MPs who, upon revelation to parliament in late summer 1678, voted to impeach the Lord Treasurer on the charges that he had "encroached to himself regal power through his conduct of foreign affairs, that he had endeavored to introduce arbitrary power by raising an army on pretense of a war, and that he was 'popishly affected' and had concealed the plot." Over the following months Danby tried to retain his position, even getting Charles to save him from a trial in the House of Lords by dissolving the Cavalier Parliament. Worked up by the Popish Plot however, the newly assembled Habeas Corpus Parliament was actually much more hostile to the king and Danby, eventually banning him from entering the royal presence. On 6 March 1679, it committed Danby to the Tower of London.

On 15 May 1679, the supporters of Anthony Ashley Cooper, 1st Earl of Shaftesbury, introduced the Exclusion Bill in the Commons with the intention of excluding James from the succession to the throne. A fringe group there began to support the claim to the throne of Charles's illegitimate – but Protestant – son, the Duke of Monmouth. As it seemed likely that the bill would pass in the House of Commons, Charles exercised his royal prerogative to dissolve Parliament again. Successive Parliaments attempted to pass such a bill, and were likewise dissolved.

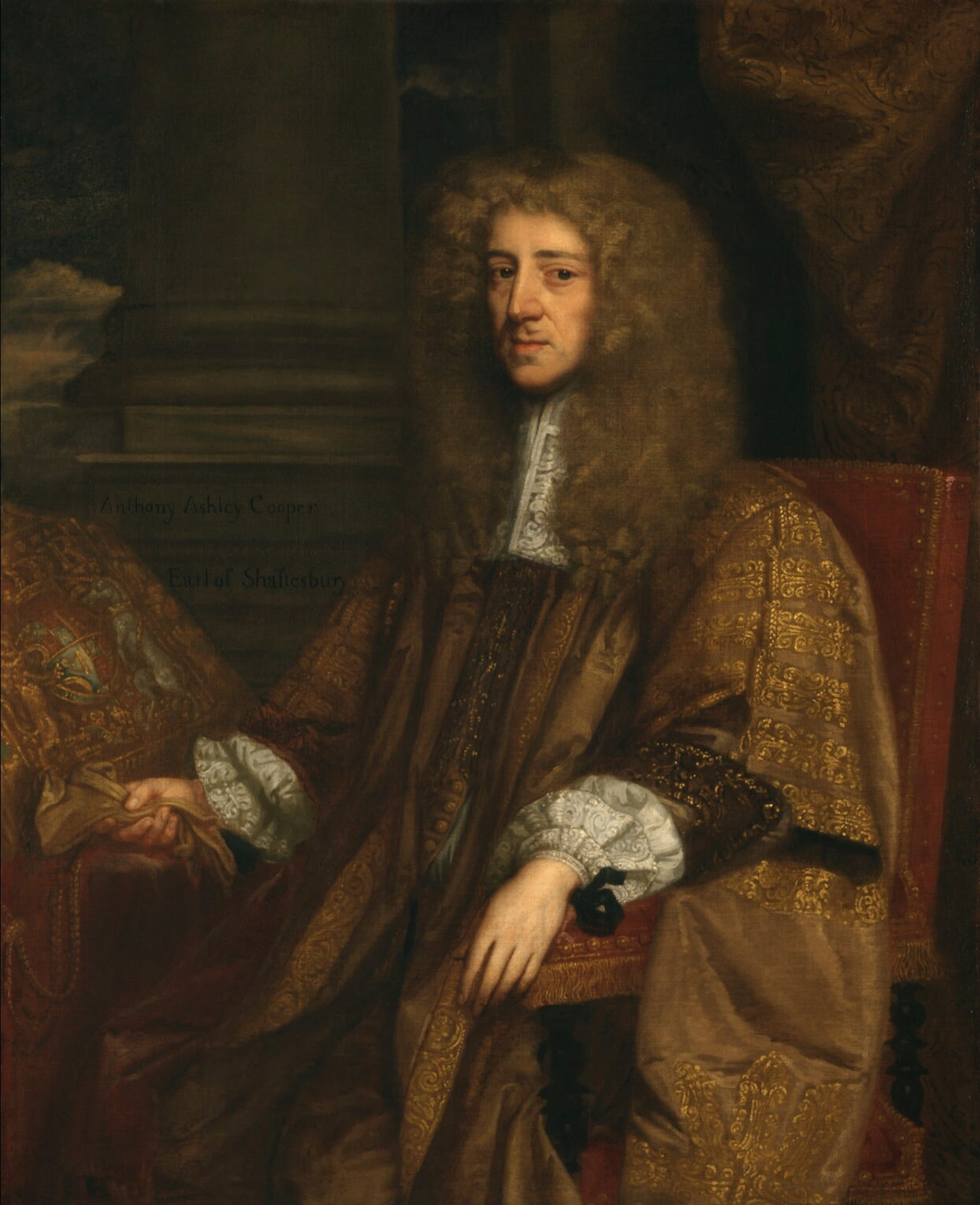
The Earl of Shaftesbury, the leader of the Whigs who introduced the Exclusion Bill in the House of Commons on 15 May 1679.

== End of the Crisis ==
While it should be treated with caution, the Exclusion Crisis is often identified as the point at which discernible political parties first emerged in England. Those who supported petitions asking Charles to recall Parliament and complete the passage of the Exclusion Bill were known as 'Petitioners' and later became Whigs. Those who opposed the Bill or the so-called Abhorrers developed into the Tories.

The nature of politics in this period is illustrated by the fact that Shaftesbury, who opposed James due to his similarities to the absolutist Catholic French regime, was supported financially by Louis XIV, who saw benefit in deepening English internal divisions. The Popish Plot was used by the Whigs to mobilise support, but moderates grew increasingly concerned by the hysteria that it generated, including causing the execution of 22 'conspirators' and accusing the Queen of conspiring to poison her husband. Many of Shaftesbury's supporters, such as the Earl of Huntingdon, now switched sides and after two failed attempts to pass the Bill, Charles succeeded in labelling the Whigs as subversives. Louis now switched financial support to Charles, allowing him to dissolve the 1681 Oxford Parliament. It was not called again during his reign, depriving the Whigs of their main source of political support, i.e., government patronage; the failed 1683 Rye House Plot then completed their isolation.

One long-lasting result of the crisis was the codification of the writ of Habeas Corpus: the one concrete achievement of the short-lived Habeas Corpus Parliament of 1679 before it was dissolved. In passing this act, the Whig leaders were concerned for their own persons, apprehensive (correctly) that the King would try to move against them through the courts. But the act far outlived the specific crisis, having long-term implications for the British legal system (and later, the American one).

== In fiction ==
Robert Neill's 1972 historical novel The Golden Days depicts the Exclusion Crisis as experienced by two Members of Parliament representing a rural constituency. Sir Harry Burnaby is a staunch Royalist who had been knighted for having helped Charles II's Restoration; his neighbour and fellow MP is Richard Gibson, an ex-Colonel in Oliver Cromwell's New Model Army, and an outspoken member of the Green Ribbon Club and of the emerging Whig party. Despite their sharp political differences, Burnaby and Gibson come to deeply respect each other, and they share the anxiety lest the unfolding crisis escalate beyond control and England be plunged again into all-out civil war. Eventually, Burnaby's son marries Gibson's daughter, with the full blessing of both fathers.

== See also ==
- Religion in the United Kingdom
- British monarchy
- Popery
- Popish Plot
