= Peachey =

Peachey is a surname. Notable people with the surname include:

- Alf Peachey (1908–?), English footballer
- Allan Peachey (1949–2011), New Zealand politician
- David Peachey (born 1974), Australian rugby league player
- Don Peachey (1933–2025), American musician
- Emma Peachey (died 1875), British wax modeller of flowers and fruit
- Sir Henry Peachey, 1st Baronet (c. 1671–1737), British landowner and politician
- James Peachey, 1st Baron Selsey (1723–1808), British politician and courtier
- John Peachey (disambiguation), several people
- Lewis Peachey (born 2001), English rugby league footballer
- Margaret Burbidge (née Peachey) (1919–2020) British-American observational astronomer and astrophysicist
- Mark Peachey (1900–1987), Australian cricketer
- Melissa Peachey (born 1980), English television personality
- Stuart Peachey, English historian
- Tyrone Peachey (born 1991), Australian rugby league player
- William Peachey (1826–1912), British architect

== See also ==
- Peachy (disambiguation)
