= Southampton Castle =

Castle in Southampton, England

- Hampshire, England
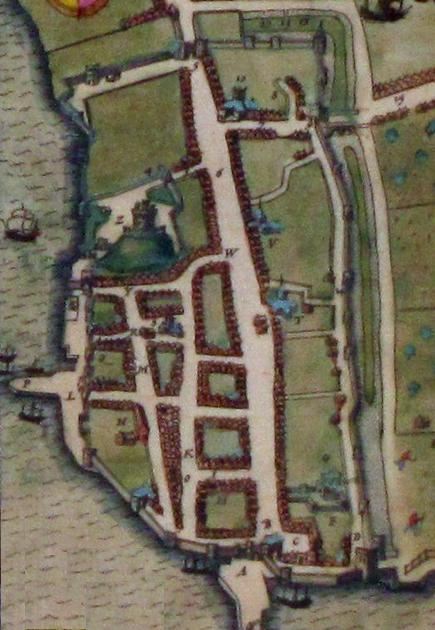
- The castle portrayed by John Speed in a map of 1612

Site information
- Type: Motte and bailey, later shell keep
- Condition: Destroyed, with isolated remains

Location
- Shown within Hampshire
- Location within Southampton
- Coordinates: 50°54′03″N 1°24′19″W
- Grid reference: grid reference SU41911141

Site history
- Materials: Stone
- Battles/wars: French raid of 1338

Southampton Castle was located in the town of Southampton in Hampshire, England. Constructed after the Norman conquest of England, it was located in the north-west corner of the town overlooking the River Test, initially as a wooden motte and bailey design. By the late 12th century the royal castle had been largely converted to stone, playing an important part in the wine trade conducted through the Southampton docks. By the end of the 13th century the castle was in decline, but the threat of French raids in the 1370s led Richard II to undertake extensive rebuilding. The result was a powerfully defended castle, one of the first in England to be equipped with cannon. The castle declined again in the 16th century and was sold off to property speculators in 1618. After being used for various purposes, including the construction of a Gothic mansion in the early 19th century, the site was flattened and largely redeveloped. Only a few elements of the castle still remain visible in Southampton.

== History ==
=== 11th–13th centuries ===
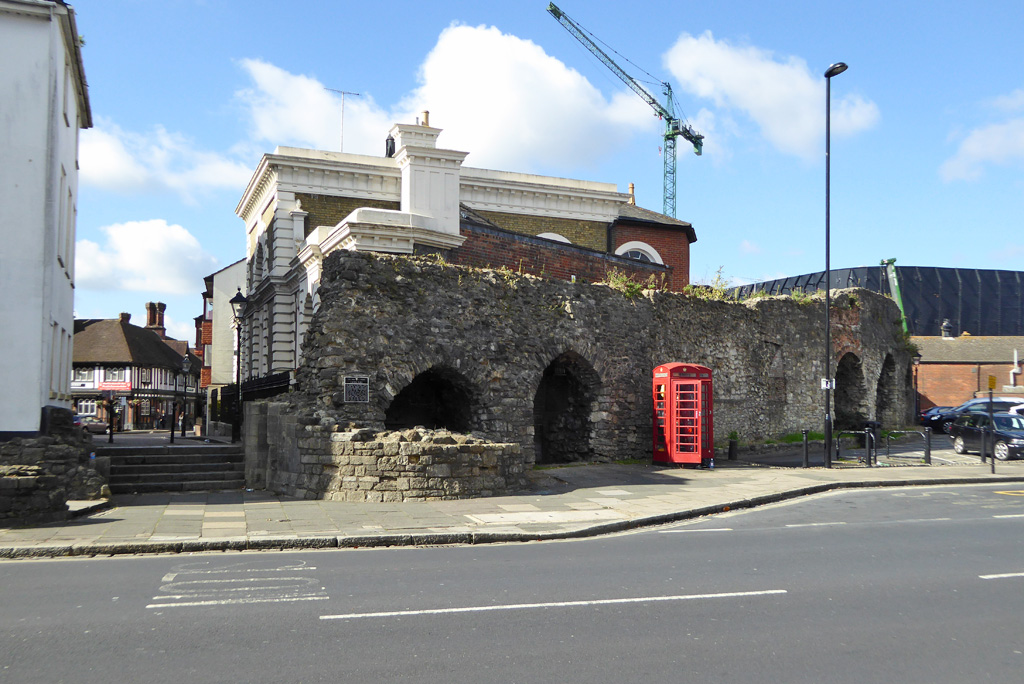
Wall of Southampton Castle

Southampton Castle was first constructed in the late 11th century, at some point after the Norman conquest of England. Southampton at this time was a relatively large town, but not as significant as in the later medieval period. The royal castle was erected within the existing town on the site of a probable large English hall, and considerable damage was caused to the surrounding local buildings as space was opened up for the new fortification. The town of Southampton was protected by water on most sides, surrounded by protective ditches and banks, and the castle was built on rising ground in the north-west corner of the town, overlooking the mouth of the River Test, an important medieval waterway. The initial castle was a timber motte and bailey design, with a motte 45 feet (14 metres) across; at least some of the bailey walls were rebuilt in stone during the first half of the 12th century. The wealthiest parts of Southampton were in the west of the town, just to the south of the castle, with some of the poorest districts just beyond the castle to the north-east. The castle was positioned so as to adjoin the town's quays.

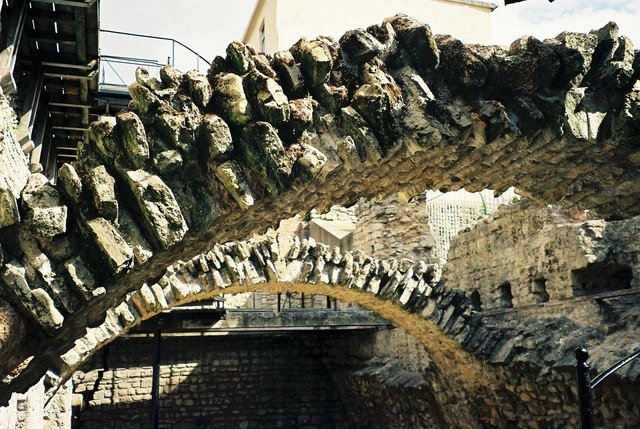
Inside the ruins of Southampton Castle

During the years of the Anarchy, in which the Empress Matilda and Stephen fought for control of England, the castle was held by William le Gros, the bishop of Winchester and supporter of Stephen. When Henry II came to the throne in 1153, he took back the castle and took steps to improve the condition of Southampton castle, as part of his attempt to improve the general standard of security in the south. At this time, Southampton was considered a key fortification, classed alongside other important castles such as the Tower of London, Windsor, Oxford, Lincoln and Winchester.

By the second half of the 12th century, Southampton Castle was valued more for its role in coastal defence and as a coastal base for operations on the continent than for its value in ensuring internal security. Following the threat of French invasion in the 1170s, Henry II invested modest additional resources in the castle, and in 1187 the wooden keep was converted into a stone shell-keep. John increased spending on the castle during his reign. Royal visits to Southampton were quite common, and additional royal accommodation, called the King's House, was built outside the castle.

Southampton was an important trading port in the 12th century, with trade routes to Normandy, the Levant and Gascony. The castle played an important role in this trade, in part forming a warehouse for the king's imports, this process being managed by a Crown Bailiff. Royal purchases of wine were particularly important for the castle, being stored and distributed to royal properties across the south of England. (Note: Royal wine at this time was transported in tuns, large wooden casks that would each hold 252 gallons. Large quantities had to be imported: in 1201, for example, King John of England stored as much as 180,000 gallons of wine in his cellars.) The former castle hall was turned into a subterranean vault in the 13th century, probably for storing wine.

=== 14th–15th centuries ===
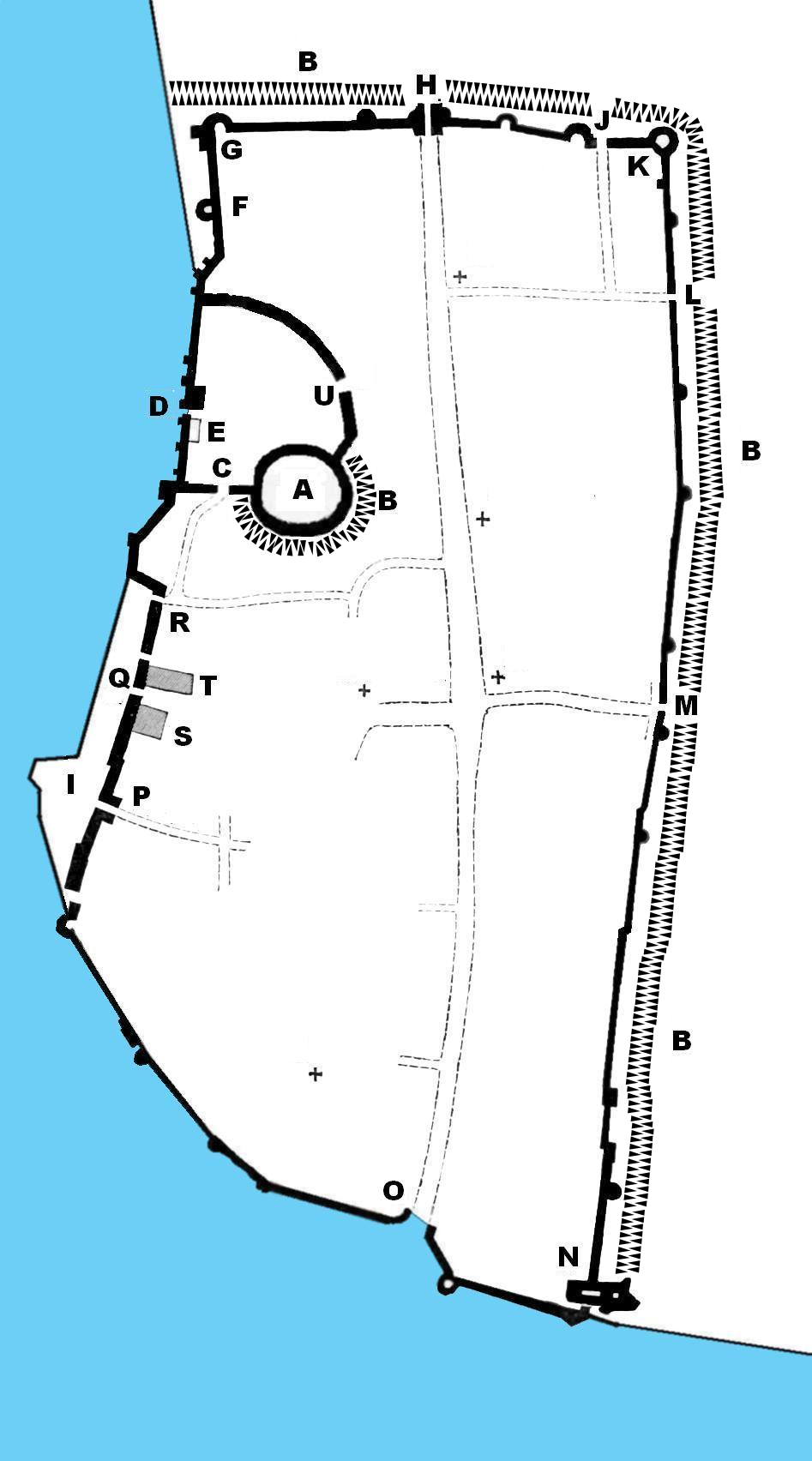
The defences of Southampton in the late medieval period. Key: A – castle keep; B – ditch; C – Southgate; D – Water gate; E – castle vaults; F – Catchcold tower; G – Arundel tower; H – Bar gate; I – Docks; J – York gate; K – Polnymond tower; L – East gate; M – Bridge gate; N – Spur; O – South gate; P – West gate; Q – Blue Anchor gate; R – Biddles Gate; S – King John's Palace; T – Norman House; U – Castle Eastgate.

By 1300, Southampton was a major port and a large provincial town, with a population of around 5,000. In 1338 there was a successful French attack on Southampton, burning various buildings down and damaging the castle. Edward III responded by improving the quality of the town defences, including building walls along the old ditch and bank defences, and particularly focusing on improving the west side of the town, but little work appears to have been done to improve the castle itself. By the middle of the 14th century, Southampton Castle sat alongside one and a quarter miles (2.0 km) of town walls, although the castle and the walls were kept administratively separate.

In 1370 the French made a successful attack on Portsmouth, commencing a new sequence of raids along the English coast. In due course first Edward, then Richard, responded with a new building programme of castles, including work at Southampton, where the castle was in a poor condition, owing in part to the theft of building materials, including stone and lead, by the citizens of the town. Henry Yevele and architect William Wynford rebuilt the keep from 1378 to 1382, whilst additional defences were added between 1383 and 1388, including a barbican and a protective mantlet wall. Thomas Tredynton was appointed to the castle as the chaplain, being paid an unusually high wage of £10 a year, reflecting his other skills as a military engineer. Southampton Castle was equipped with its first cannon in 1382, making it one of the first castles in the country to be so equipped. At this time cannon were still unreliable, only capable of reaching relatively short ranges and required the construction of specialist gunports; once again, the decision was driven by the fears of French attack. An "expert in guns and the management of artillery" was retained during the 15th century to manage the new weaponry.

After the scare of 1457, when French troops successfully attacked the town of Sandwich on the south coast, Southampton Castle was once again put on alert, and one of Henry VI's more "dependable captains", Nicholas Carew, was given control of the castle for life. Despite investment in the castle declining, the antiquarian John Leland could describe the new keep in the early 16th century as being "the glory of the castle, both large and fair and very strong, both by works and by the site of it".

=== 16th–19th centuries ===
The castle began a second period of decline in the 16th century. After 1518, no more money was spent repairing the castle. The inner bailey became used first as a rubbish tip, then for small-scale agriculture. By 1585, the castle was "very ruynaise and in greete decaye". In contrast to many royal castles, Southampton Castle was never converted into a gaol, with Southampton's two prisons instead being built in the town at the Bargate and on Fish Street. In 1618 James I sold the castle to property speculators; it was then sold on to George Gollop, a local merchant, and a windmill was subsequently built on the motte. The castle played no role in the subsequent English Civil War, although some of the masonry was used to strengthen the town walls in 1650. Two of the entrances to the castle, Southgate and Castle Eastgate, were demolished in the late 18th century; and the remaining castle buildings fell into significant disrepair.

Several short-lived buildings were later constructed on top of the motte. The first of these around the turn of the 19th century was a banqueting house constructed by Lord Stafford. In 1808 John Petty, 2nd Marquess of Lansdowne built a mansion in a Gothic style on top of the motte using some of the stone remains of the old keep; it became known as Landsdowne Castle, providing famous views across the town. Landsdowne Castle was pulled down in either 1815 or 1818, and most of the motte was subsequently flattened.

From the late 19th century onwards the castle site was subject to considerable development. A new road – Upper Bugle Street – was built through the old bailey site, and various local council buildings constructed. Development continued after the Second World War, in which large parts of the city around the castle were significantly damaged by bombing. (Note: Southampton formally ceased to be a town and became a city in 1964.)

== Today ==
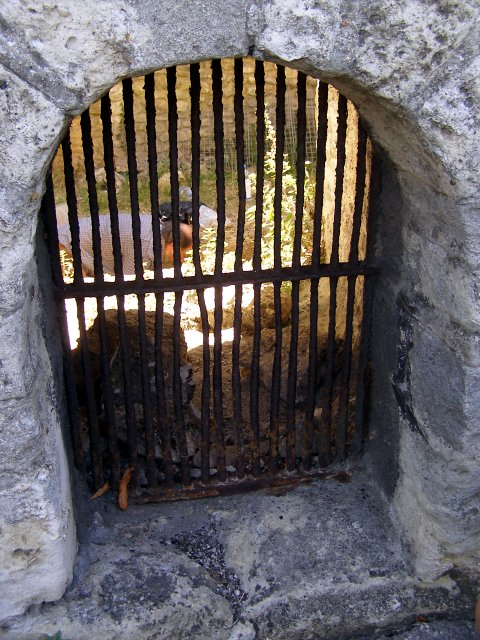
Archaeological excavation under way at the Castle Watergate in 2006

Only fragments of the medieval castle survive today, with most of the original site covered by modern buildings and dominated by the block of flats built in 1962 over the remaining part of the castle motte. A sequence of archaeological investigations between 1973 and 1983 excavated around 10% of the total castle area, and more limited work has occurred since, including a "watching brief" excavation carried out in Forest View road in 2001.

The castle hall, Castle Vault, Castle Watergate and the foundations of the garderobe tower were incorporated into the Town's city walls and still survive and are viewable as part of the Walk the Town Walls walking route. The hall can be viewed from above from a metal gantry and information panels provide the story of the site. Visitors can go inside the Castle Vault as part of guided tours run throughout the year or for special events including the Heritage Open Days events. Additionally, the castle gateway remains at foundation level as does sections of the southern and northern bailey walls, the latter of which stands to 20 feet high as the removal of the earth banks against these walls has exposed the foundation piers of these walls which are the prominent feature of the curtain wall.

As part of Southampton's bid to be named UK City of Culture in 2025, the city council announced a £6.7 million package of restoration and repairs to monuments across the city including the Castle.

== See also ==
- Castles in Great Britain and Ireland
- List of castles in England

== Bibliography ==
- Bradbury, Jim. (2009) Stephen and Matilda: the Civil War of 1139–53. Stroud, UK: The History Press. ISBN 978-0-7509-3793-1.
- Brown, Duncan. (1999) "Class and rubbish," in Funari, Hall and Jones (eds) 1999, chapter 9, pages 151–163.
- Brown, R. Allen. (1962) English Castles. London: Batsford.
- Danziger, Danny and John Gillingham. (2003) 1215: The Year of Magna Carta. London: Coronet Books. ISBN 978-0-7432-5778-7.
- Drage, C. (1987) "Urban castles" in Schofield and Leech (eds) (1987)
- Dugdale, James. (1810)The New British Traveller, or Modern Panorama of England and Wales, volume two. London: Robins.
- Dyer, Christopher. (2009) Making a Living in the Middle Ages: The People of Britain, 850 – 1520. London: Yale University Press. ISBN 978-0-300-10191-1.
- Emery, Anthony. (2006) Greater Medieval Houses of England and Wales, 1300–1500: Southern England. Cambridge: Cambridge University Press. ISBN 978-0-521-58132-5.
- Funari, Pedro Paulo A., Martin Hall and Sian Jones (eds). (1999) Historical Archaeology: Back From The Edge. London: Routledge. ISBN 978-0-415-11787-6.
- Gerrard, Christopher M. (2005) Medieval Archaeology: Understanding Traditions and Contemporary Approaches. Oxon, UK: Routledge. ISBN 978-0-415-23463-4.
- Griffiths, Ralph Alan. (1981) The Reign of King Henry VI: the Exercise of Royal Authority, 1422–1461. Berkeley, US: University of California Press. ISBN 978-0-520-04372-5.
- Liddiard, Robert. (2005) Castles in Context: Power, Symbolism and Landscape, 1066 to 1500. Macclesfield, UK: Windgather Press. ISBN 0-9545575-2-2.
- Mackenzie, James D. (1896) The Castles of England: Their Story and Structure, Vol II. New York: Macmillan.
- Ottaway, Patrick. (1992) Archaeology in British towns: from the Emperor Claudius to the Black Death. London: Routledge. ISBN 978-0-415-00068-0.
- Pounds, Norman John Greville. (1990) The Medieval Castle in England and Wales: a social and political history. Cambridge: Cambridge University Press. ISBN 978-0-521-45828-3.
- Pugh, Ralph B. (1968) Imprisonment in Medieval England. Cambridge: Cambridge University Press. ISBN 978-0-521-06005-9.
- Schofield, J. and R. Leech. (eds) (1987) Urban Archaeology in Britain: CBA Research Report 61. London: CBA.
- White, Graeme J. (2000) Restoration and Reform, 1153–1165: Recovery from Civil War in England. Cambridge: Cambridge University Press. ISBN 978-0-521-55459-6.
