= Thomas Bootle =

English landowner and Member of Parliament

Sir Thomas Bootle (bapt. 16 May 1685 – 25 December 1753) was an English landowner and Member of Parliament.

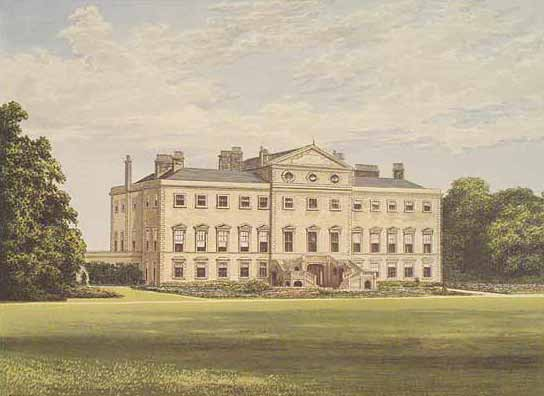
Lathom House, built for Sir Thomas Bootle, 1740

He was the eldest son of Robert Bootle of Maghull, Lancashire and studied law at Lincoln's Inn (1708) and the Inner Temple (1712) and was called to the bar in 1713. He served as King's attorney and serjeant within the Duchy of Lancaster from 1712 to 1727 and was created a KC by 1726.

He succeeded his father in 1708 and bought the Lathom House estate at Lathom, near Skelmersdale, Lancashire. There he commissioned Giacomo Leoni to replace the existing house with the finest Palladian house in the county. Started in 1725 it was completed in 1740.

He was elected Member of Parliament for Liverpool in 1724, sitting until 1734 and for Midhurst from 1734 to 1753. He was Mayor of Liverpool for 1726–27.

He was attorney-general of the county palatine of Durham from 1733 to 1753. He was chancellor to Frederick, Prince of Wales in 1740–51 and to George, Prince of Wales from 1751 to his death. He was knighted in 1745.

Bootle died unmarried in Oxford in 1753. Lathom House passed to his younger brother Robert and then to Robert's daughter Mary.

Parliament of Great Britain
Preceded by Bulstrode Knight; Sir Richard Mill, Bt	Member of Parliament for Midhurst; 1734–1754; With: Bulstrode Knight 1734–1736; Sir Henry Peachey, Bt 1736–1738; Sir John Peachey, Bt 1738–1744; Sir John Peachey, Bt 1744–1754	Succeeded by Sir John Peachey, Bt; John Sargent
Preceded by Langham Booth; William Cleiveland	Member of Parliament for Liverpool; 1724–1734; With: Langham Booth 1723–1724; Thomas Brereton 1724–1729; Sir Thomas Aston, 4th Baronet 1729–1734	Succeeded by Thomas Brereton; Richard Gildart
