= Sir John Mill, 1st Baronet =

English politician

Sir John Mill, 1st Baronet (1 April 1587 – 1648) was an English politician who sat in the House of Commons at various times between 1624 and 1640.

Mill was the younger son of Lewknor Mill, of Camois Court and his wife, Cicely (or Cecily, daughter of John Crook of Southampton), and educated in the law at Gray's Inn. He succeeded his elder brother in 1587 and was created a baronet of Camois Court on 3 December 1619. He inherited the manors of Newton Bury and Fullerton.

In 1624, Mill was elected Member of Parliament for Southampton and re-elected for the same constituency in 1625 and 1626. In 1625 he was Colonel of a regiment of the Hampshire Trained Bands. He was appointed High Sheriff of Hampshire for 1627–28. In April 1640 he was again re-elected MP for Southampton in the Short Parliament. During the English Civil War he raised regiments of Horse and Foot that garrisoned Christchurch for King Charles I.

Mill married twice; firstly Elizabeth More, daughter of Sir George More, of Loseley Park, but she died without issue and secondly, Anne Fleming, daughter of Sir Thomas Fleming, Lord Chief Justice of England, with whom he had several children. His eldest son Sir John Mill was killed fighting on the Royalist side in the Civil War and had married Philadelphia Knollys, daughter of Sir Henry Knollys, of Grove Place, Hampshire, comptroller of the household to Charles I. Their son, Sir John Mill, 2nd Baronet, succeeded his grandfather in the baronetcy and inherited his (sequestered) estates.

Parliament of England
Preceded by Henry Sherfield; Sir Thomas Fleming	Member of Parliament for Southampton; 1624–1626; With: Henry Sherfield 1624; John Bonde 1624; George Gallop 1625–1626	Succeeded by John Major; George Gallop
Parliament suspended since 1629	Member of Parliament for Southampton; 1640; With: Thomas Levington	Succeeded by George Gallop; Edward Exton
Baronetage of England
New creation	Baronet (of Camois Court); 1619–1648	Succeeded by John Mill
