= Sir Richard Mill, 5th Baronet =

British landowner and politician

Sir Richard Mill

Member of Parliament for Horsham
- In office 1741-1747 Serving with Hon. Charles Ingram

Member of Parliament for Penryn
- In office 1734-1741 Serving with John Clavering

Member of Parliament for Midhurst
- In office 1721-1722; 1729-1734 Serving with Alan Brodrick (1721-1722); Bulstrode Knight (1729-1734)

Personal details
- Born: c. 1689
- Died: 16 May 1760 (aged 70–71)
- Spouse: Mary Knollys (m. 1713)
- Children: 9
- Education: St. John's College, Oxford

Sir Richard Mill, 5th Baronet (c. 1689 – 16 May 1760) of Woolbeding House, Sussex was a British landowner and politician who sat in the House of Commons between 1721 and 1747.

== Biography ==
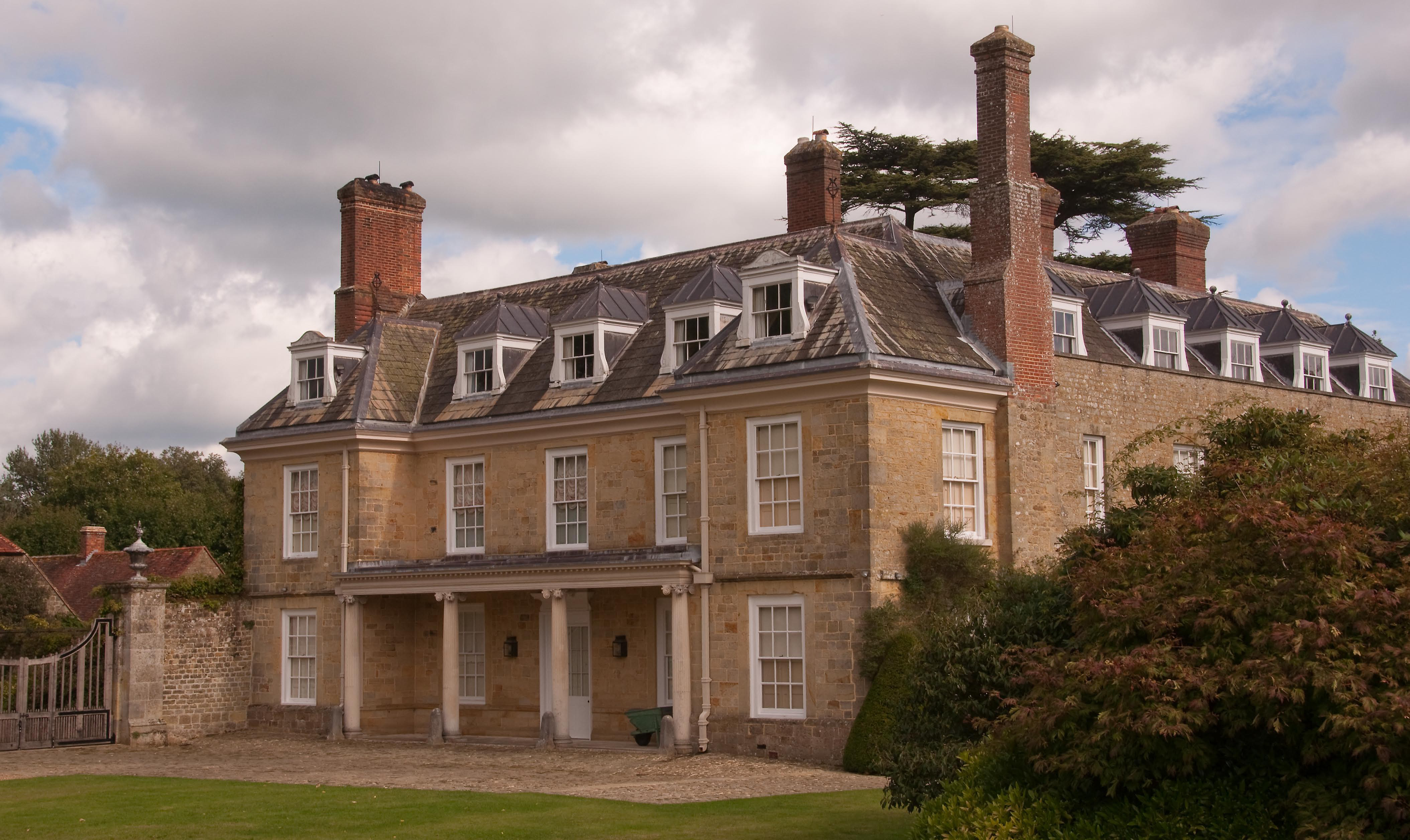
Woolbeding House

Mill was the second son of Sir John Mill, 3rd Baronet of Woolbeding and his wife Margaret Grey, daughter of Thomas Grey of Woolbeding. He succeeded his brother John in the baronetcy in 1706 He matriculated at St John's College, Oxford on 12 March 1708, aged 18. On 12 March 1713, he married. Mary Knollys, daughter of Robert Knollys of Grove Place, Nursling, Hampshire.

Mill was brought in by the Duke of Somerset to fill a vacancy at Midhurst and was returned unopposed as Member of Parliament at a by-election on 6 November 1721. He did not stand at the 1722 general election. In 1723 he was High Sheriff of Hampshire. He was brought in again at a by-election at Midhurst on 1 February 1729 and represented the borough until 1734. At the 1734 general election he was elected MP for Penryn in the interest of Richard Edgcumbe. He was returned unopposed for Horsham at the 1741 general election by the 7th Viscount Irwin at the request of the Duke of Newcastle. He voted with the Administration consistently and retired in 1747.

Mill died on 16 May 1760. He had four sons Richard, John, Henry, and Charles who succeeded to the baronetcy in turn. His five daughters were Margaret, Philadelphia, Elizabeth, Mary and Martha.

Parliament of Great Britain
Preceded by William Woodward Knight; Alan Brodrick	Member of Parliament for Midhurst; 1721–1722; With: Alan Brodrick	Succeeded by Bulstrode Knight; Alan Brodrick
Preceded by Bulstrode Knight; Alan Brodrick	Member of Parliament for Midhurst; 1729–1734; With: Bulstrode Knight	Succeeded by Bulstrode Knight (Sir) Thomas Bootle
Preceded by Sir Cecil Bishopp; Edward Vernon	Member of Parliament for Penryn; 1734–1741; With: John Clavering	Succeeded by John Evelyn; Edward Vernon
Preceded by Charles Eversfield; Hon. Charles Ingram	Member of Parliament for Horsham; 1741–1747; With: Hon. Charles Ingram	Succeeded by Charles Ingram; Hon. Charles Ingram
Baronetage of England
Preceded by John Mill	Baronet (of Camois Court) c.1706–1760	Succeeded by Richard Mill
