= Bulstrode Knight =

British landowner and politician (c.1681–1736)

Bulstrode Peachey Knight (c. 1681–1736) of West Dean in Sussex and Chawton in Hampshire was a British landowner and politician who sat in the House of Commons from 1722 to 1736.

Knight was born Peachey, the fifth son of William Peachey, merchant of London, and his wife Mary Hall, daughter of John Hall of Newgrove, Petworth, Sussex. He joined the army, was a cornet in the Royal Horse Guards in 1704, and was exempt in the 3rd Life Guards in 1705.

Peachey bought burgages at Midhurst from Anthony Browne, 6th Viscount Montagu, and was returned unopposed as Member of Parliament for Midhurst at the 1722 general election. He continued purchasing burgages from Montagu and increased his holding to 49. He consolidated his interest at Midhurst by marrying Elizabeth Knight, widow of William Woodward Knight and daughter of Michael Martin of Eynsham, Oxfordshire, on 8 June 1725. In doing so, he took the additional name of Knight He was returned unopposed at the general elections of 1727 and 1734. His only recorded vote was for the Hessians in 1730.

Knight died without issue on 14 January 1736. His brothers Henry, James and John were also MPs.

Parliament of Great Britain
| Preceded by Sir Richard Mill, Bt; Alan Brodrick | Member of Parliament for Midhurst; 1722–1736; With: Alan Brodrick; Sir Richard Mill, Bt (Sir) Thomas Bootle | Succeeded by Sir Henry Peachey, Bt (Sir) Thomas Bootle |
