= Baron Selsey =

Barony in the Peerage of Great Britain

Arms of the Peachey baronets and Barons Selsey

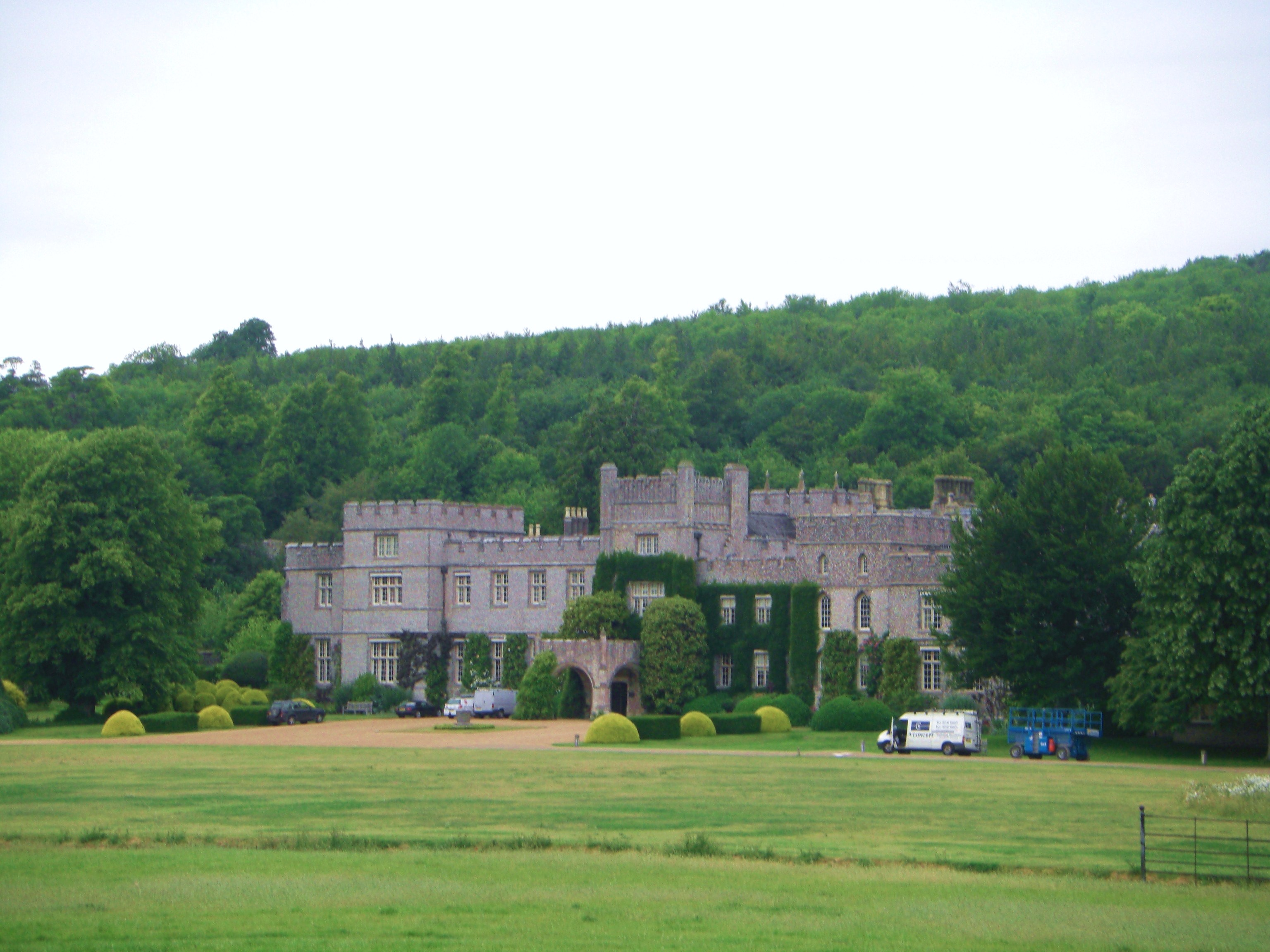
West Dean House, the seat of the Peachey family

Baron Selsey, of Selsey in the County of Sussex, was a title in the Peerage of Great Britain. It was created on 13 August 1794 for Sir James Peachey, 4th Baronet, Master of the Robes to King George III. He was succeeded by his son, the second Baron. He represented St Germans and Shoreham in Parliament. His eldest son, the third Baron, was a Captain in the Royal Navy. The titles became extinct on his death in 1838.

The Baronetcy, of Petworth in the County of Sussex, was created in the Baronetage of Great Britain on 21 March 1736 for Henry Peachey, Member of Parliament for Sussex and Midhurst, with special remainder in default of male issue of his own to his brother John Peachey and the male issue of his body. Peachey had two sons who predeceased him, unmarried, and was succeeded according to the special remainder by his brother, John, the 2nd Baronet, who subsequently represented Midhurst in Parliament. His elder son, the 3rd Baronet, succeeded his father as Member of Parliament for Midhurst; he was childless and was succeeded by his younger brother the 4th Baronet.

Between 1738 and 1871 the Barons Selsey resided at West Dean House, in West Dean, West Sussex. The house has now become West Dean College, dedicated to the arts.

== Peachey baronets, of Petworth (1736) ==
- Sir Henry Peachey, 1st Baronet (c. 1671–1737)
- Sir John Peachey, 2nd Baronet (c. 1680–1744)
- Sir John Peachey, 3rd Baronet (c. 1720–1765)
- Sir James Peachey, 4th Baronet (1723–1808) (created Baron Selsey in 1794)

== Barons Selsey (1794) ==
- James Peachey, 1st Baron Selsey (1723–1808)
- John Peachey, 2nd Baron Selsey (1749–1816)
- Henry Peachey, 3rd Baron Selsey (1787–1838)

== Extended family ==
- Bulstrode Peachey Knight, brother of the 1st and 2nd Baronets, also sat as Member of Parliament for Midhurst.

Baronetage of Great Britain
Preceded by Turner baronets	Peachey baronets of Ambrosden; 21 March 1736	Succeeded by Payne baronets
