= Westminster Hall =

Medieval great hall in London, England

Coordinates: 51.49986°N 0.12537°W

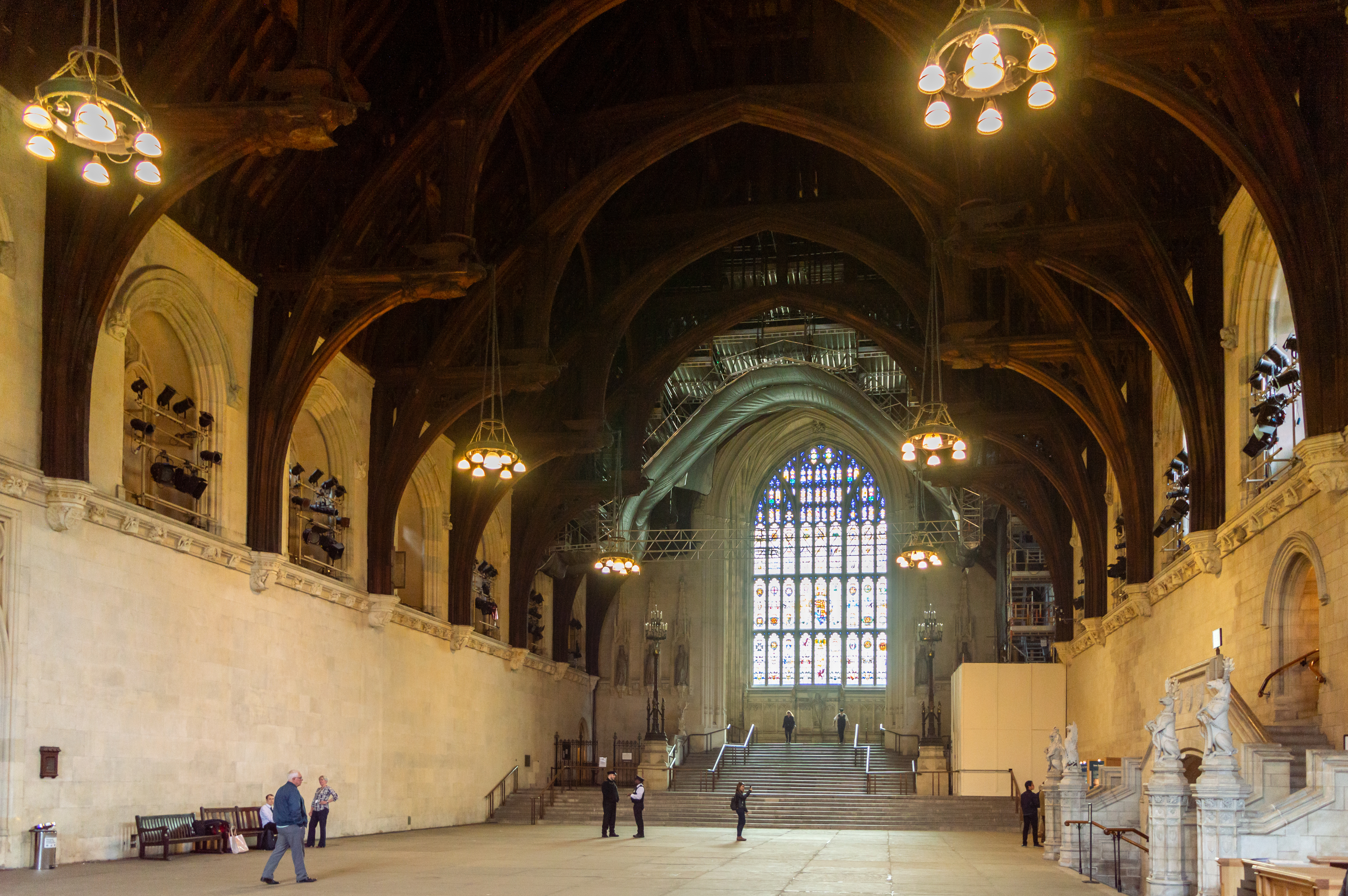
The interior of the hall in 2018

Westminster Hall is a medieval great hall which forms part of the Palace of Westminster in London. It was built in 1097 for William II, and at that time was one of the largest halls in Europe. It is particularly notable for its hammerbeam roof, which was commissioned for Richard II in 1393 and built by the royal carpenter, Hugh Herland. At the same time the rest of the hall was remodelled by the master mason Henry Yevele. The hall survived the fire of 1834 and bombing in World War II and, in spite of various restorations, has maintained its medieval structure and many of its features.

The hall has served a variety of ceremonial and administrative functions throughout its history. From the twelfth to the nineteenth centuries it was home to the courts of King's Bench, Chancery, and Common Pleas. It was the scene of important state trials, including those of Thomas More, Guy Fawkes and King Charles I. Banquets and royal entertainments were hosted in the hall, with the last coronation banquet being that of George IV in 1821. Since the twentieth century, the hall has been the venue for the lyings in state of state funerals. It is used for special addresses by Parliament to the monarch, and is on rare occasions the venue for joint addresses to the two chambers of Parliament.

== Early history ==
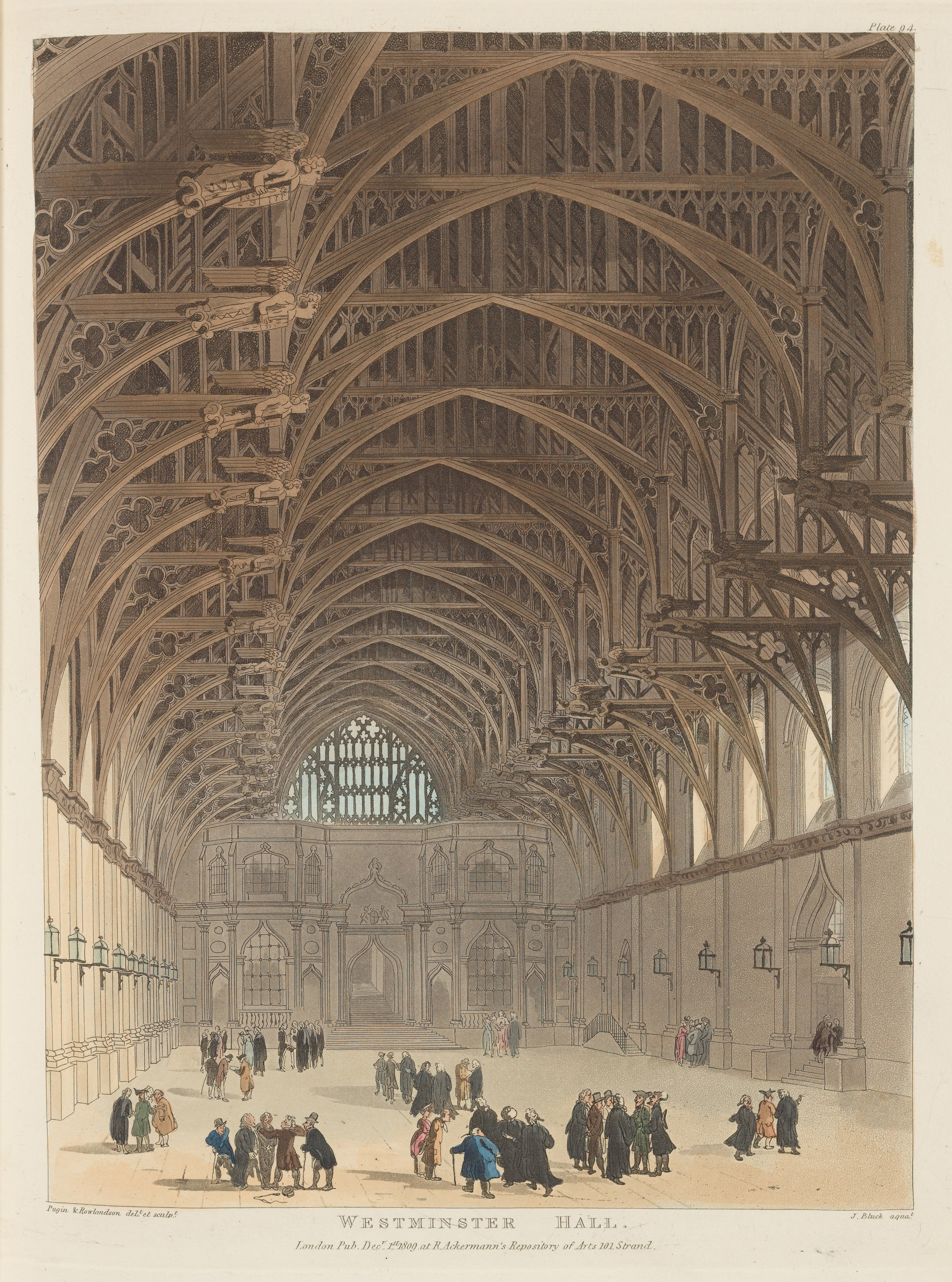
Westminster Hall in 1809

Westminster Hall, which is the oldest surviving building within the Palace of Westminster, was built as a Great Hall for William II. The foundations were laid in 1097 and the building was completed by 1099. At that time it was the largest hall in England, and possibly Europe. During its early history, the main use of the hall was for feasts and banquets. William II held the Whitsun feast in the hall on its completion in 1099. The earliest coronation banquets were those of Prince Henry in 1170 and Richard I of England in 1189. There were banquets when the king's Great Council met, and to mark other important occasions. Henry III provided feasts for poor people in the hall, the only king to have done so. The king's Great Council usually met in a smaller hall when at Westminster, but the Great Hall was the location for a show of strength, as when war was declared against France in 1337.

In 1215, Magna Carta stated that common pleas should be heard in a fixed location, which was normally Westminster Hall. The Court of King's Bench and the Court of Common Pleas were established as separate courts, with the former still following the king until the early fifteenth century, when it joined the Court of Common Pleas in Westminster Hall. The hall was also used for state trials: the trial of William Wallace took place there in 1305. By the end of the thirteenth century, merchants were selling their wares from booths and stalls in the hall.

In 1385, Richard II commissioned statues of thirteen kings from Edward the Confessor to himself for the hall. Six of them were placed in niches on the south wall and have since remained there. A new roof and renovations were commissioned in 1393. The work was carried out under the supervision of carpenter Hugh Herland and masons Henry Yevele and Walter Walton. The walls of the hall were refaced and a cornice, a string-course with carvings of the king's emblems such as a white hart, corbels, traceried windows and flying buttresses were added. Oak timber for the new hammerbeam roof was cut from royal forests in Hampshire, Surrey and Hertfordshire and brought to Westminster by teams of horses, with the last part of the journey by water. The hammer beams were decorated with twenty-six carved angels. Two towers and a pinnacle were added to the north facade, but the work was incomplete when Richard II was deposed in Westminster Hall in 1398; the work was continued by Henry IV, who was crowned in the hall.

== Tudors and Stuarts ==
Royal feasts and celebrations continued to be held in Westminster Hall under the early Tudors. When Catharine of Aragon arrived in England to marry Prince Arthur lavish entertainments, or "disguisings", were staged in the hall, accompanied by jousting in New Palace Yard. The last feast, except for coronation feasts, to be held in the hall was at Christmas 1549.

The hall continued to accommodate the Court of King's Bench and the Court of Common Pleas. They were joined by the Court of Chancery when it became a separate court in the fifteenth century. The King's Bench and Chancery sat in opposite corners of the south end of the hall, while the Common Pleas was situated at the north end. State trials held in the Hall included those of Thomas More (1535), John Fisher (1535), Guy Fawkes (1606), the Earl of Strafford (1641), King Charles I (1649), and the Seven Bishops (1688). There were still shops in the hall in the seventeenth century; Samuel Pepys described buying books and items of clothing there in his diary in the 1660s.

== 18th and 19th centuries ==
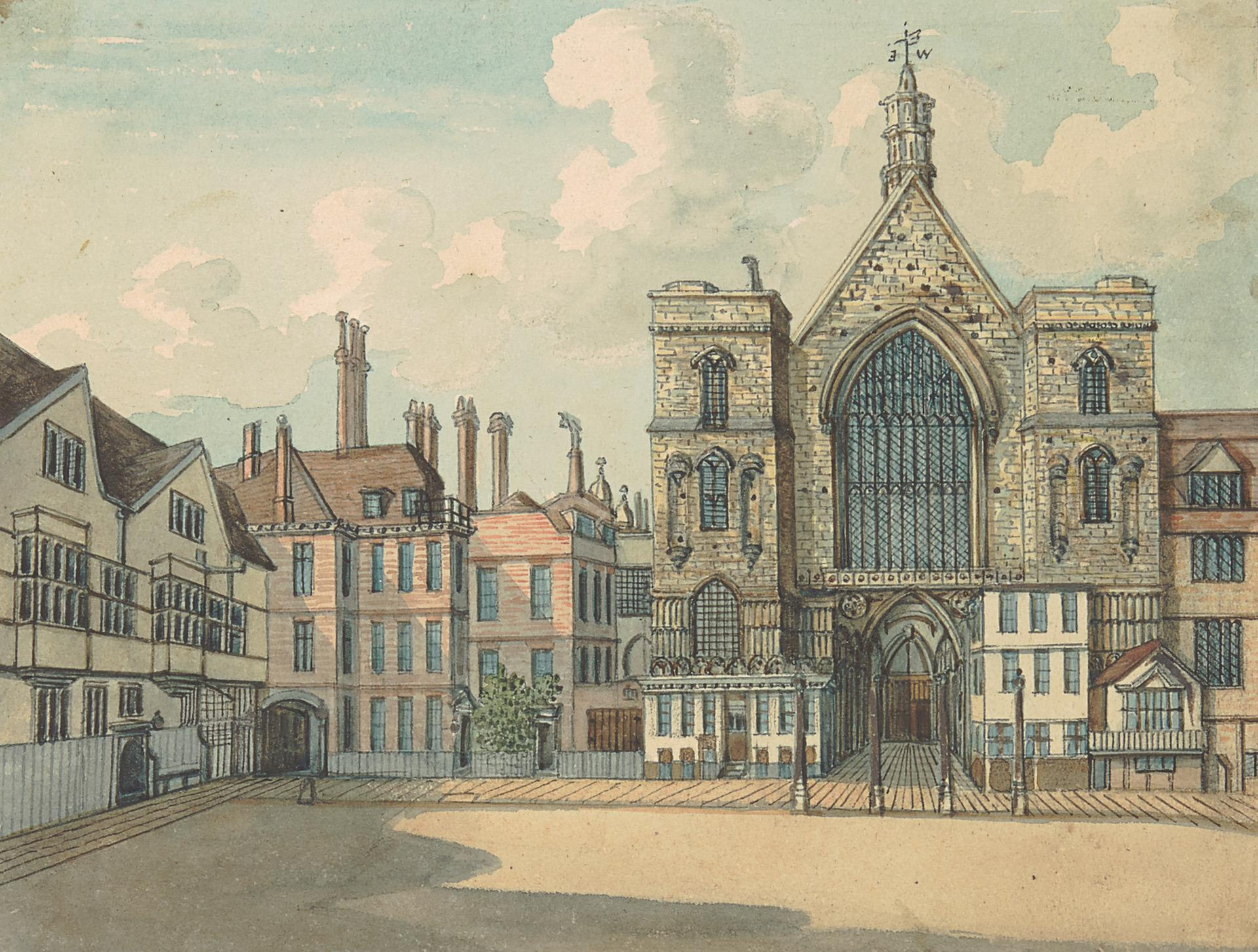
Westminster Hall in 1798

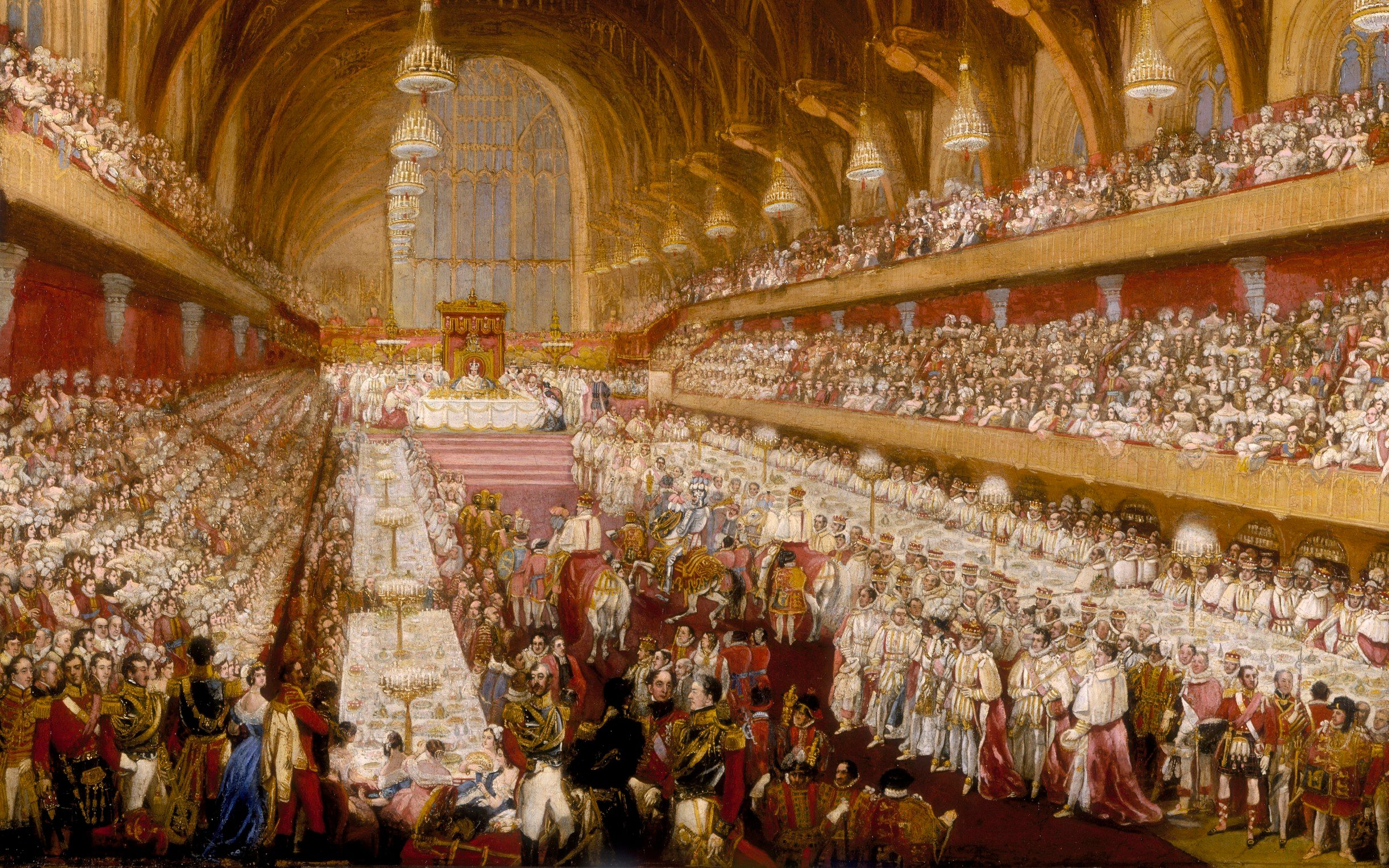
The coronation banquet of George IV in 1821

Restorations undertaken in the 1740s included the insertion of props inside the Hall to support the roof, and the replacement of lead on the roof with Westmorland slates. The shops were removed from the Hall in 1780, the walls refaced, and the floor raised to reduced damp and flooding. In 1819-22, architect Sir John Soane rebuilt the decaying north front, following instructions to keep to the style of Richard II's hall. In 1739, a Gothic screen, designed by William Kent, was built to enclose the courts of the King's Bench and Chancery, which were later roofed over, while in 1740 the Court of Common Pleas was moved to a new courtroom to the west of the hall. In 1826, the courts of the King's Bench and Chancery moved into new courts built by Soane to the west of the hall, with the hall serving as an antechamber. In 1882, the courts were moved to the new Royal Courts of Justice building in the Strand and the old ones were demolished.

State trials held in the Hall during the eighteenth century included those Henry Sacheverell (1710), the Scottish Lords involved in Jacobite rising of 1715 (1716) and the Jacobite rising of 1745 (1746-47), Earl Ferrars (1760), and the bigamist Duchess of Kingston (1776). The impeachment of Warren Hastings was heard in the Hall in 1788-95, and that of Viscount Melville in 1806. The last coronation banquet was that of George IV in 1821. His successor, William IV, deemed it too expensive, and the custom was not restored by any later monarchs.

On 16 October 1834, the Palace of Westminster was largely destroyed by a fire that was started by the careless burning of tally sticks in a heating furnace below the chamber of the House of Lords. The fire was fought during the evening and night by parish and insurance company fire engines, and the private London Fire Engine Establishment, led by James Braidwood, with the help of hundreds of volunteers. Braidwood concentrated on saving the hall, which, although protected by its thick stone walls, was vulnerable on account of the wooden roof, and it survived the fire largely intact. When Sir Charles Barry was rebuilding the ruined Palace of Westminster, he incorporated changes to the south end of the hall.

== 20th and 21st centuries ==
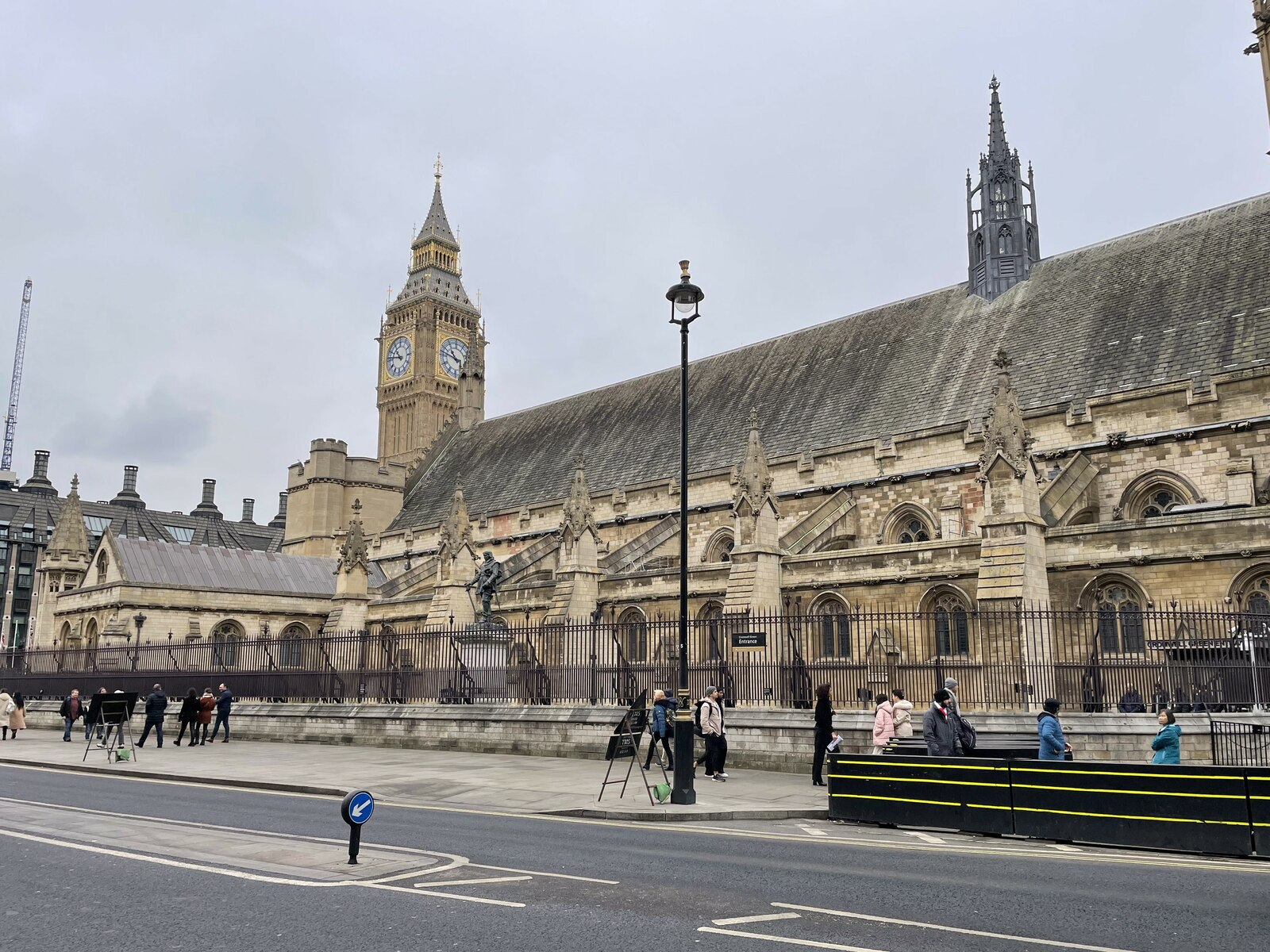
Street view of Westminster Hall, 2023

The hall continued to be used for ceremonial purposes during the twentieth and twenty-first centuries. There were royal occasions when the two Houses of Parliament presented addresses to the monarch, for example at Elizabeth II's Silver Jubilee (1977), Golden Jubilee (2002) and Diamond Jubilee (2012), and the accession of Charles III (2022). There have also been addresses on important anniversaries, for example, the 300th anniversary of the Glorious Revolution (1988) and the fiftieth anniversary of the end of the Second World War in Europe (1995). It is considered a rare privilege for a foreign leader to be invited to address both Houses of Parliament in Westminster Hall. Since the Second World War, the only leaders to have done so have been French president Charles de Gaulle in 1960, South African president Nelson Mandela in 1996, Pope Benedict XVI in 2010, U.S. president Barack Obama in 2011, Burmese opposition leader Aung San Suu Kyi in 2012, and Ukrainian president Volodymyr Zelenskyy in 2023. Although the last coronation banquet was that of George IV in 1821, lunches were held in the hall after the coronations in 1911, 1937 and 1953.

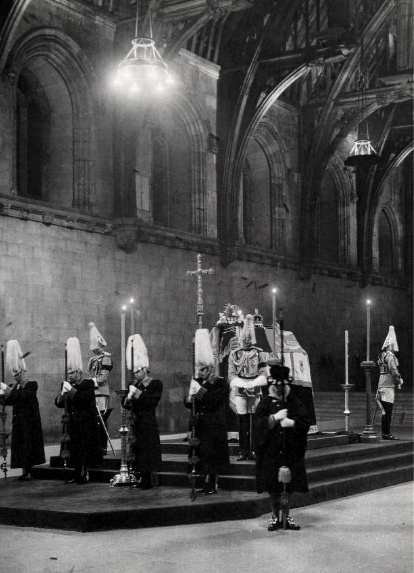
George V lying in state in the hall in 1936

The first lying-in-state to take place in Westminster Hall was that of William Gladstone in 1898. The hall continued to be used for lying-in-state, usually for sovereigns and their consorts, but also for the victims of the R101 airship in 1930 and for Winston Churchill in 1965, when an estimated one million people paid their respects. When Elizabeth II lay in state in September 2022, about 250,000 people filed past the coffin, which resulted in the delamination of the Yorkstone floor.

The Parliamentary War Memorial, or Recording Angel memorial, was designed by Sir Bertram Mckennal in 1921 and is located under the stained glass window in St Stephen's Porch at the south end of the hall. It displays on eight panels the names of the members of both Houses, parliamentary staff, and their sons who were killed while serving in the First World War. The window above, installed in 1952, commemorates the members of both Houses and parliamentary staff who died in the Second World War. In 2012, a new stained glass window commemorating the Diamond Jubilee of Elizabeth II was installed opposite this window at the other end of the hall.

Extensive restoration of the wooden roof was carried out by Sir Frank Baines after the discovery in 1913 of deathwatch beetle in the timbers. On the night of 10 May 1941, at the height of the Blitz, the Palace of Westminster was hit with incendiary bombs. Scottish politician Walter Elliot happened to be nearby and directed firefighters to prioritise saving the medieval hall rather than the chamber of the House of Commons, the roof of which was also alight, and smashed through a door to the hall with an axe so hoses could be brought in.

Women's suffrage has been celebrated in the hall with an exhibition in 1978 on the fiftieth anniversary Equal Franchise Act, and the installation in 2016 of New Dawn, a glass artwork by Mary Branson which is illuminated with light levels changing according to the tidal level of the River Thames.

Following reforms in 1999, the House of Commons has used the Grand Committee Room off Westminster Hall as an additional debating chamber, where backbench Members of Parliament can raise matters of interest to them and receive a response from a government minister. Although the chamber is not part of the hall, these debates are usually spoken of as Westminster Hall debates.

== Architecture ==
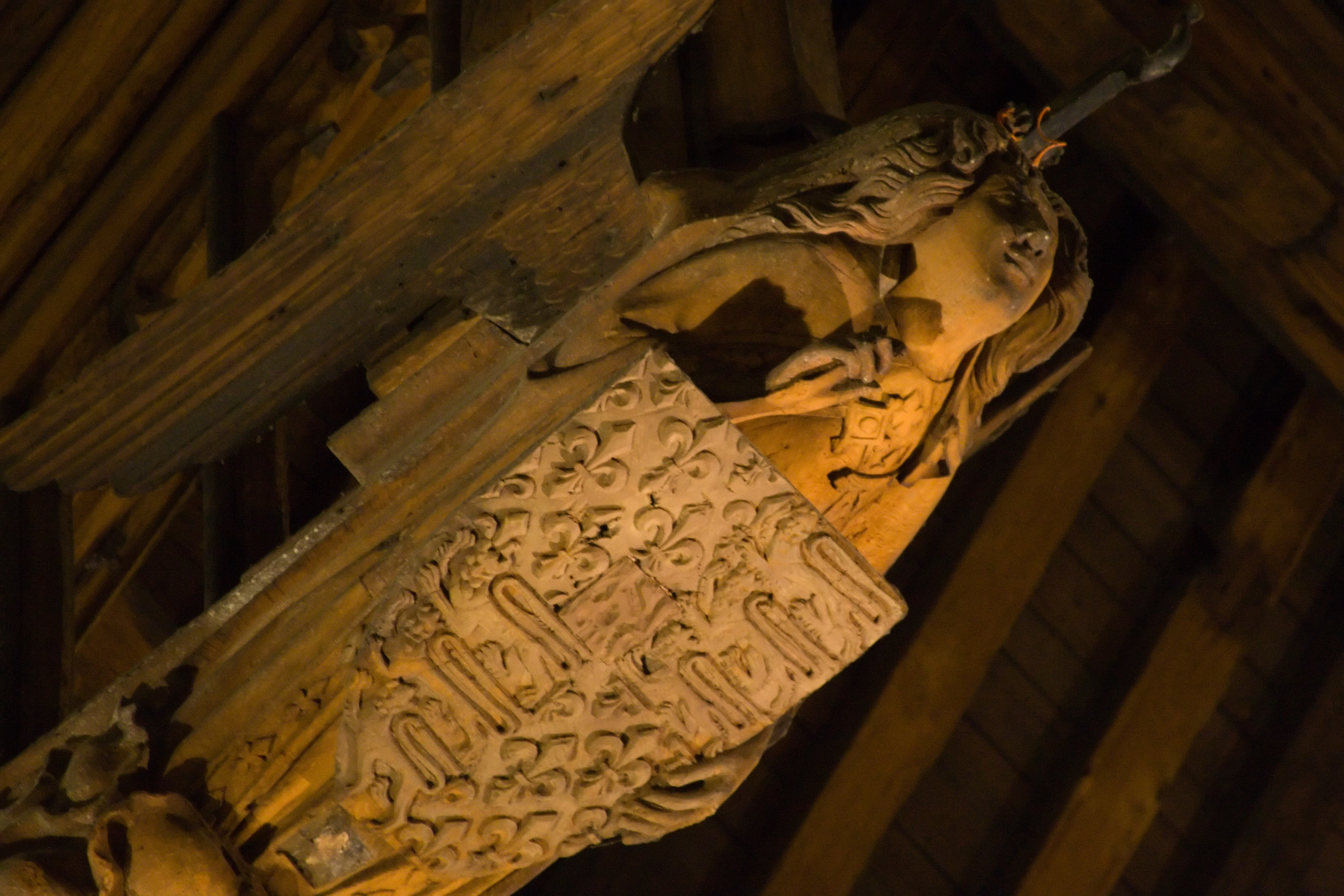
One of the angel corbels which support the roof

The hall is notable for its hammerbeam roof, which was commissioned by Richard II in 1393. It was built by the royal carpenter, Hugh Herland, and is considered "the greatest creation of medieval timber architecture" creating a single huge open space, with a dais at the end. Richard's master builder Henry Yevele retained the original dimensions, refacing the walls, with fifteen life-size statues of kings placed in niches. The rebuilding had been begun by King Henry III in 1245, but by Richard's time had been dormant for over a century. Included in Richard's renovations are repetitions of his favourite heraldic badge – a White Hart, chained, and in an attitude of rest – which is repeated eighty-three times without any being an exact copy of another. Architectural historian John Harvey has called the roof "the single greatest work of art of the whole of the European Middle Ages".

The floor area of the hall is about 1,547 sq m (1,850 sq yds) and the roof is one of the largest clearspan medieval roofs in Europe The oak timbers for the roof came from royal woods in Hampshire; parks in Hertfordshire; from that of William Crozier of Stoke d'Abernon, who supplied over 600 oaks from Surrey; and other sources. They were assembled near Farnham, Surrey, 35 miles (56 km) away, and brought to London by wagons and barges. The design of the original roof is unknown. It is believed that, until the 13th or 14th century, carpenters were unable to create a roof significantly wider than the length of the timber available, yet no evidence of supporting columns has been found.

== See also ==
- St Mary Undercroft
