= George Gallop =

English politician (1590–1650)

George Gallop (1590–1650) was an English politician who sat in the House of Commons at various times between 1625 and 1650. He supported the Parliamentary cause in the English Civil War.

Gallop was the son of Thomas Gallop, of Strode, Dorset and his wife, Agnes Watkins, daughter of Humphrey Watkins of Holwel, Somerset.

He became a merchant of Southampton and in July 1619 acquired the property of Southampton Castle. He became an alderman of the city.

In 1625, Gallop was elected Member of Parliament for Southampton. He was re-elected MP for Southampton in 1626 and 1628 and sat until 1629 when King Charles decided to rule without parliament for eleven years. In 1632, he was the mayor of Southampton.

In November 1640, Gallop was re-elected MP for Southampton in the Long Parliament. He supported the parliamentary cause and survived Pride's Purge to sit in the Rump Parliament Gallop died in 1650. He left a charitable donation to provide clothing for poor people.

Parliament of England
Preceded by Sir John Mill, 1st Baronet; John Bonde	Member of Parliament for Southampton; 1625–1629; With: Sir John Mill, 1st Baronet 1625–1626; John Major 1628–1629	Parliament suspended until 1640
Vacant Parliament suspended since 1629	Member of Parliament for Southampton; 1640–1650; With: Edward Exton	Not represented in Barebones Parliament
