= John Peachey =

John Peachey may refer to:

- Sir John Peachey, 2nd Baronet (c. 1680–1744), British landowner and politician
- John Peachey, 2nd Baron Selsey (1749–1816), British politician
- John Peachey (footballer) (born 1952), English footballer
