= Mill baronets =

Extinct baronetcy in the Baronetage of England

The Mill Baronetcy, of Camois Court in the County of Sussex, was a title in the Baronetage of England. It was created on 31 December 1619 for John Mill, subsequently Member of Parliament for Southampton. The third Baronet was High Sheriff of Hampshire in 1685. The fifth Baronet was member of parliament for Midhurst, Penrhyn and Horsham. The sixth Baronet sat as a Knight of the Shire for Hampshire. The title became extinct on the death of the tenth Baronet in 1835.

== Mill baronets, of Camois Court (1619) ==
- Sir John Mill, 1st Baronet (died 1648)
- Sir John Mill, 2nd Baronet (died 1670)
- Sir John Mill, 3rd Baronet (1661–c. 1687)
- Sir John Mill, 4th Baronet (1681–c. 1706)
- Sir Richard Mill, 5th Baronet (1690–1760)
- Sir Richard Mill, 6th Baronet (c. 1717–1770)
- Sir John Hoby Mill-Hoby, 7th Baronet (1719–1780)
- Sir Henry Mill, 8th Baronet (died 1781)
- Sir Charles Mill, 9th Baronet (died 1792)
- Sir Charles Mill, 10th Baronet (1765–1835)

== See also ==
- Barker-Mill baronets
