= Henry Yevele =

14th-century English mason

- Born: c. 1320; Derbyshire, England
- Died: 1400 (aged 79–80)
- Occupation: Architect

Henry Yevele (c. 1320 – 1400) was the king of England's master mason from 1360 until his death in 1400.

== Early life and career ==
Henry is believed to have been born around 1320 possibly in Derbyshire to Roger and Marion Yevele. His father Roger was likely also a mason and is believed to have taught the trade to Henry.

At the Palace of Westminster, Yevele was responsible for refacing Westminster Hall. He was responsible for the Bloody Tower at the Tower of London.

The most significant of Yevele's remaining works are the naves of Westminster Abbey (1362) and Canterbury Cathedral (1377–1400), the latter completed in an early Perpendicular Gothic style.

== Death ==
Yevele died in 1400 and was buried at the church of St Magnus the Martyr by London Bridge. His monument was extant in John Stow's time (the late 16th century), but was probably destroyed by the Great Fire of London.

== Work ==
Works that can be attributed to Yevele with a reasonable level of certainty include:

- Kennington Manor (part, 1358, destroyed)
- Bloody Tower of the Tower of London (1361)
- Abbot's House and College Hall, Westminster Abbey (1362)
- Nave and west cloister, Westminster Abbey (1362)
- Palace of Westminster clock tower (1365, destroyed)
- Parts of old London Bridge (destroyed)
- London Charterhouse (1371)
- The high altar screen of Durham Cathedral (1372–80), shipped in boxes from London to Newcastle
- Savoy Palace (part, 1376, destroyed)
- West Gate, Canterbury (1378)
- The east and south walks of the cloister of St Albans Abbey (probably begun c.1380) (not mentioned by Harvey)
- The south transept façade of Old St Paul's Cathedral (1381–8) (not mentioned by Harvey)
- Old St Dunstan-in-the-East (part, 1381, destroyed)
- Rochester bridge (1383, destroyed)
- Canterbury city walls (1385)
- Nave and south cloister of Canterbury Cathedral (1377–1400)
- Westminster Hall (1395)
- The tombs of
  - Cardinal Simon Langham (d. 1376) in Westminster Abbey (1389)
  - Edward III in Westminster Abbey (after 1386)
  - Richard II in Westminster Abbey (1395)
  - Edward, the Black Prince in Canterbury Cathedral (1376)
  - Archbishop Simon Sudbury in Canterbury Cathedral (begun mid-1380s? Died 1381 but the tomb was created in a perpendicular style, according to the Canterbury Cathedral notes, circa 1391.)
  - John of Gaunt and Blanche of Lancaster (1374–80; destroyed) in the choir of Old St Paul's Cathedral.

== Gallery of architectural works ==
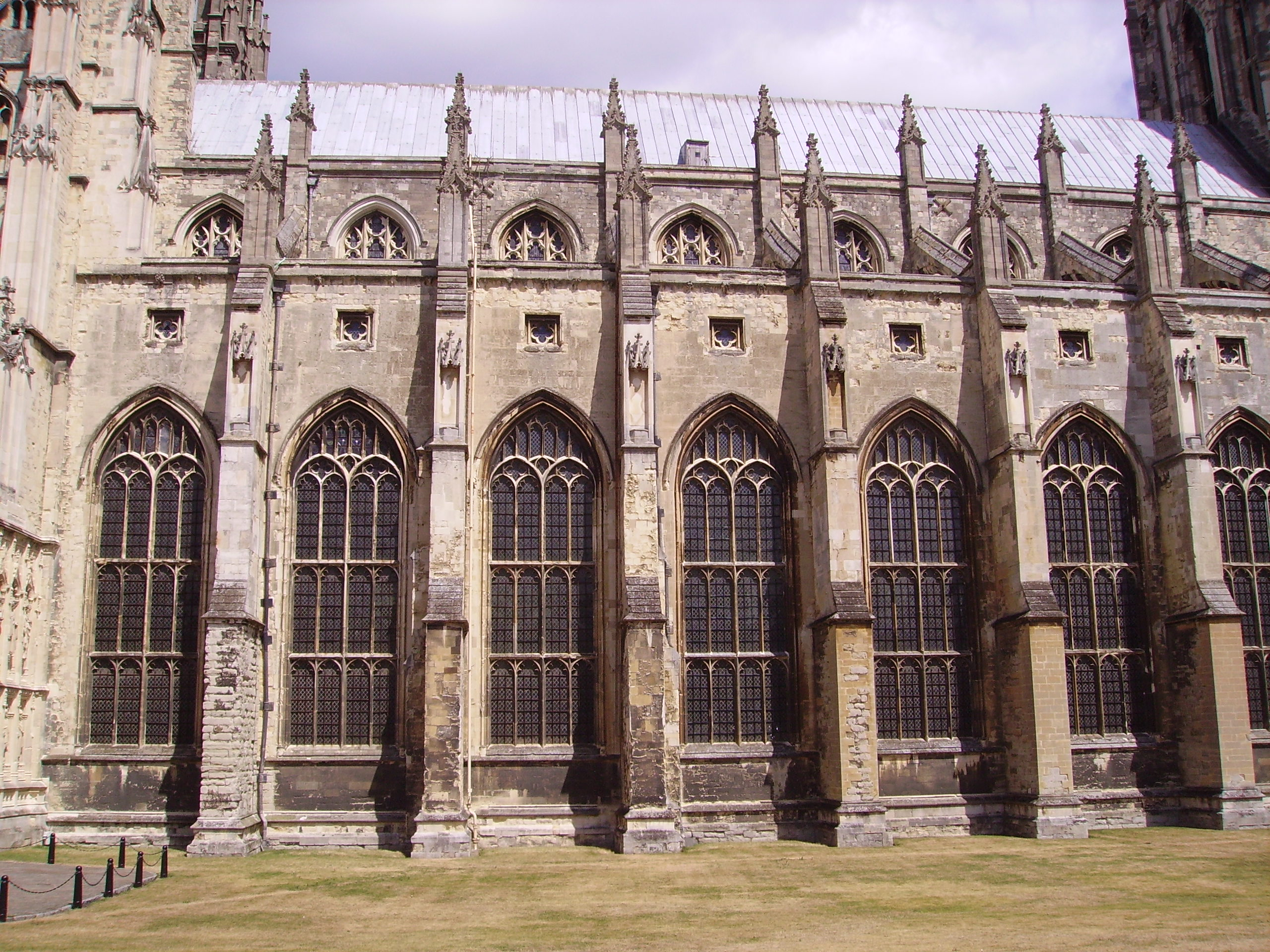
Canterbury Cathedral, the south side of the nave

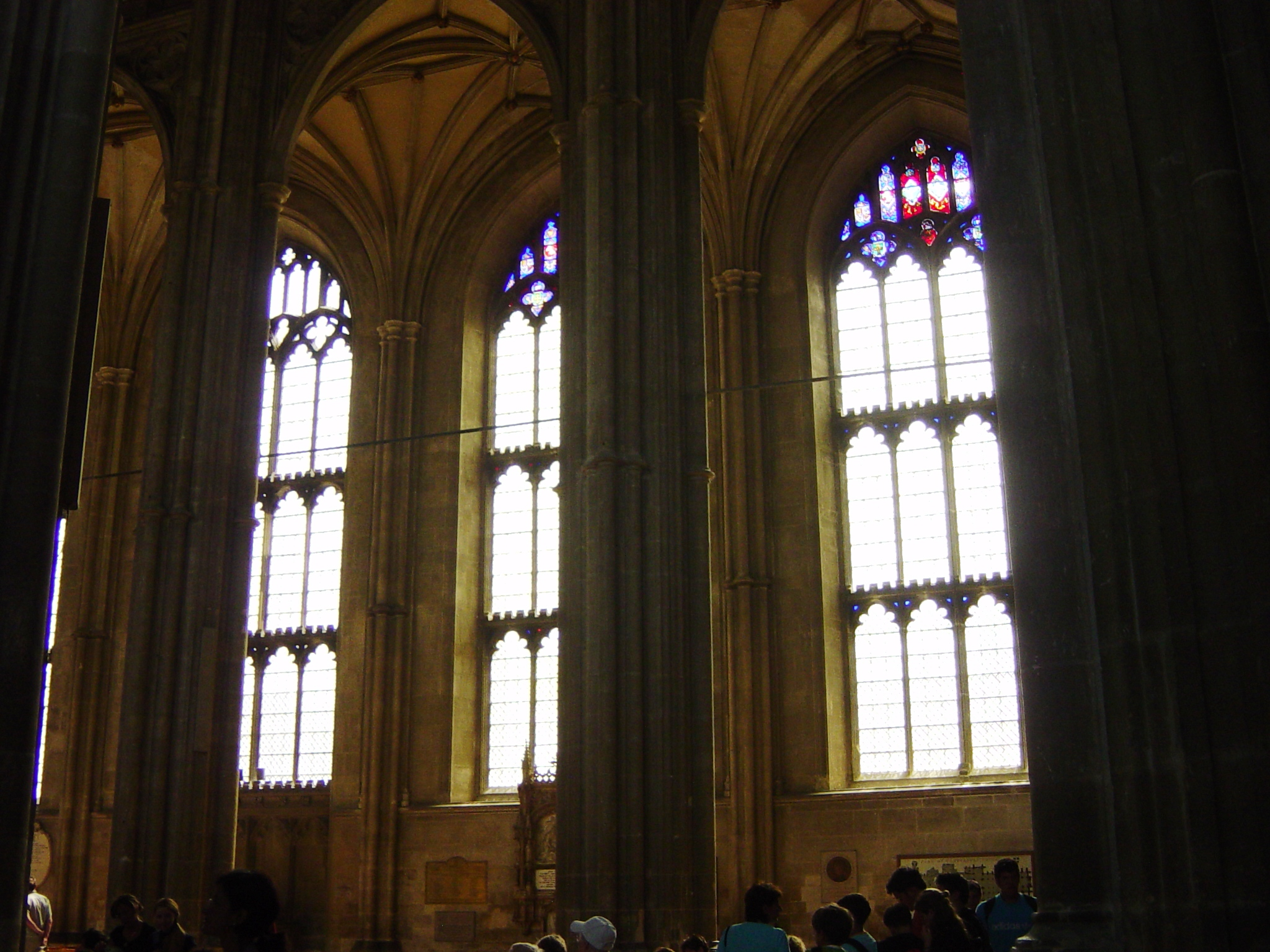
Canterbury Cathedral, the south aisle of the nave

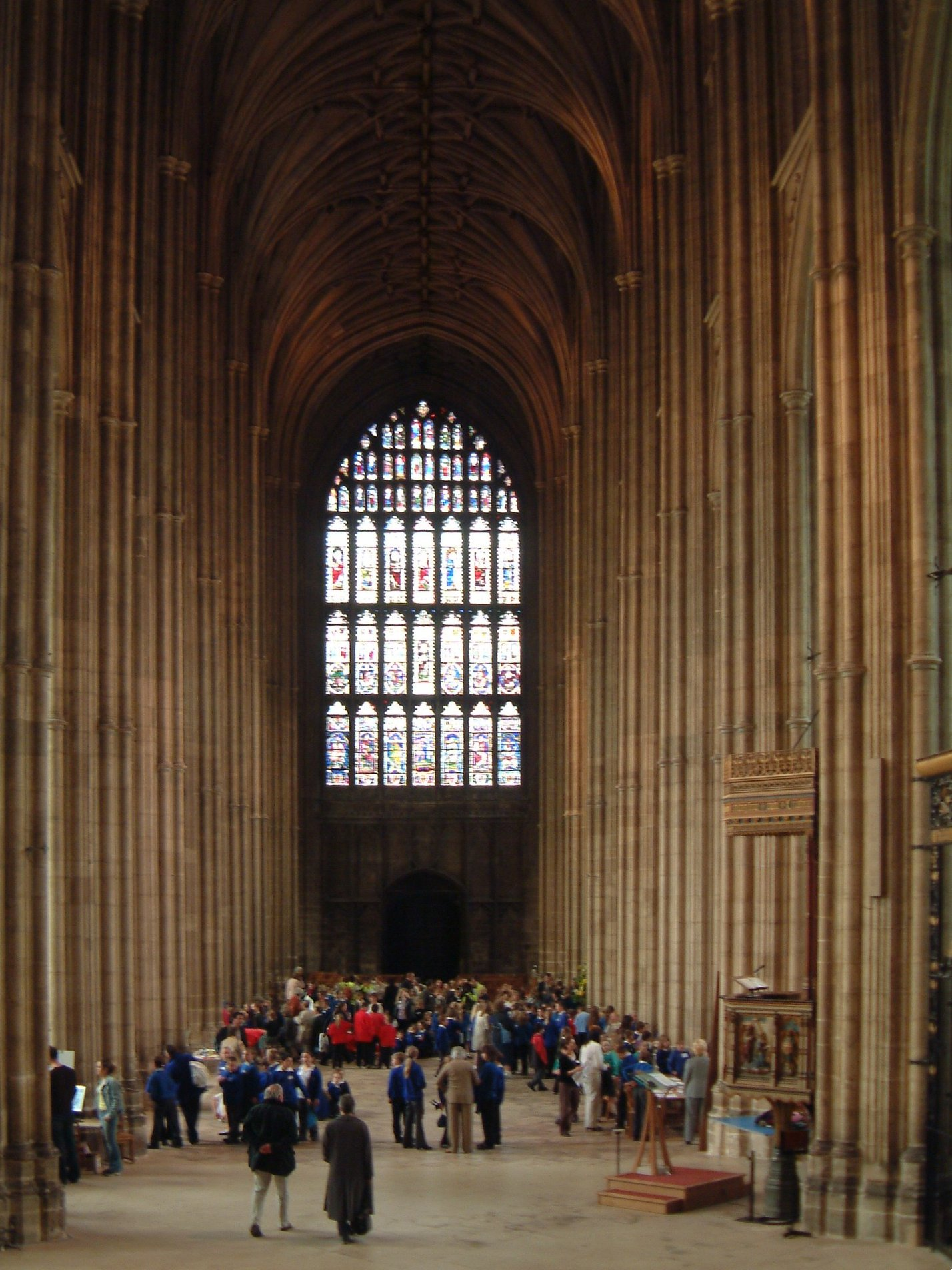
Canterbury Cathedral, nave looking west

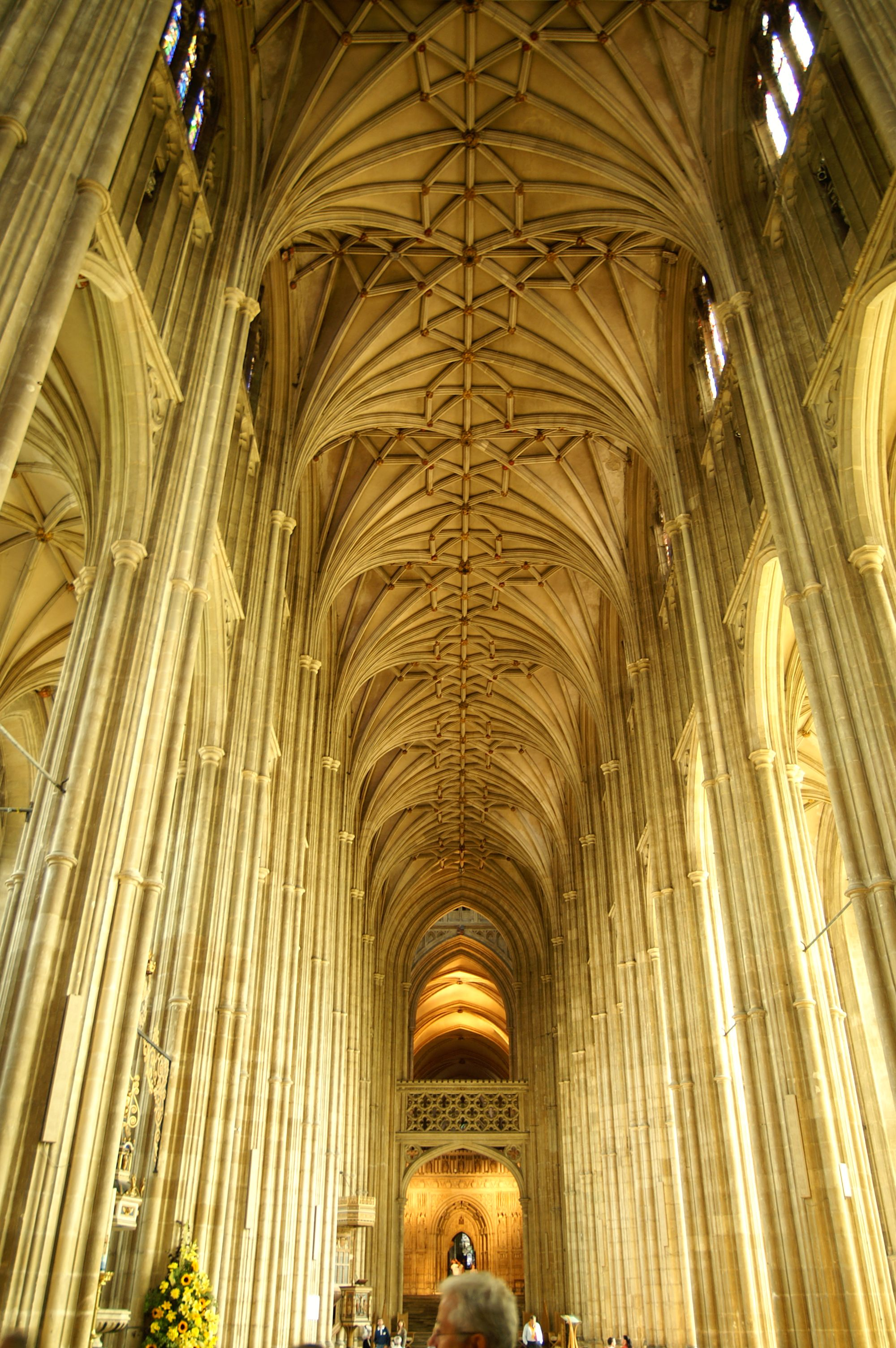
Canterbury Cathedral, nave looking east

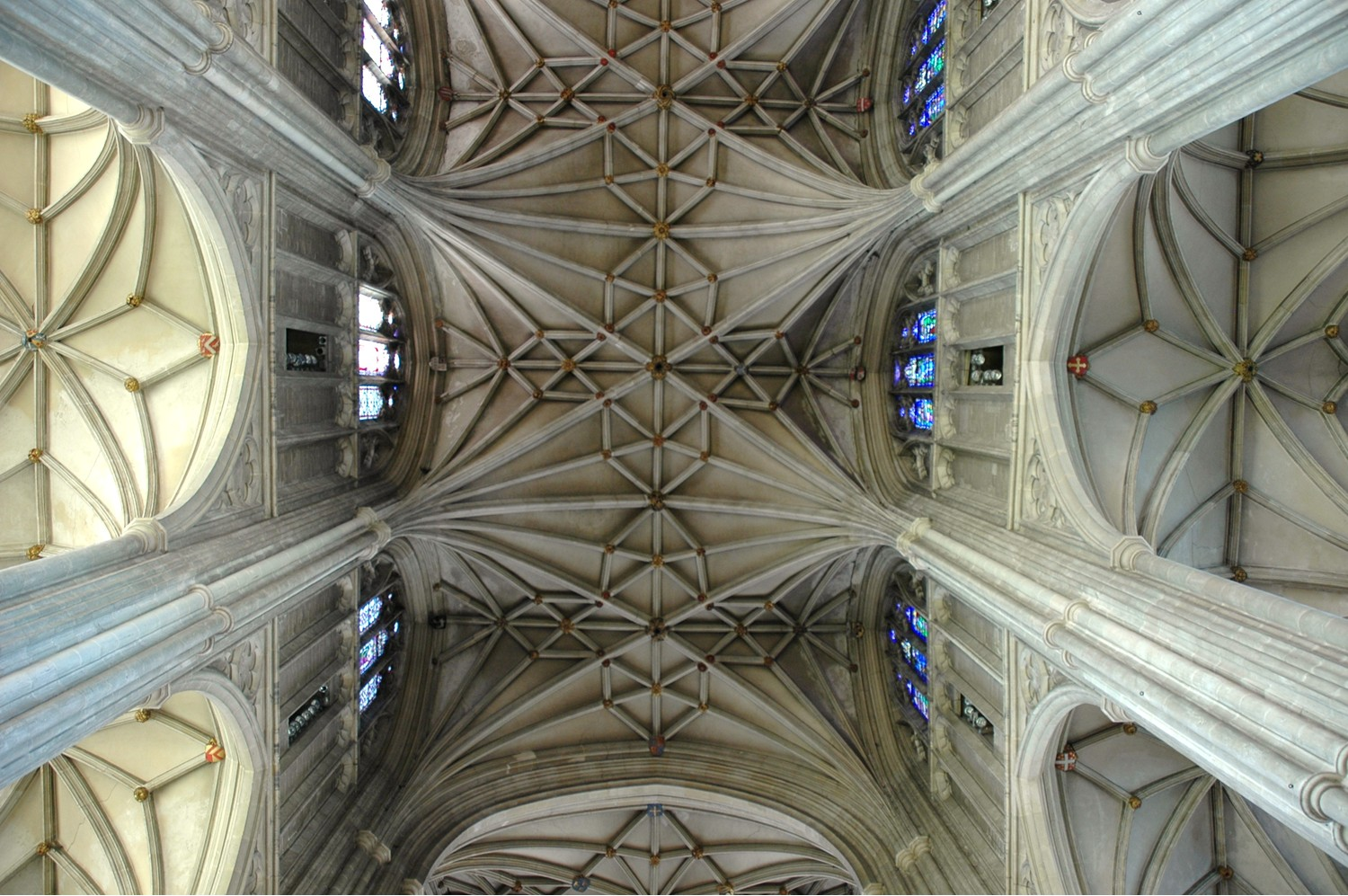
Canterbury Cathedral, vaulting in nave

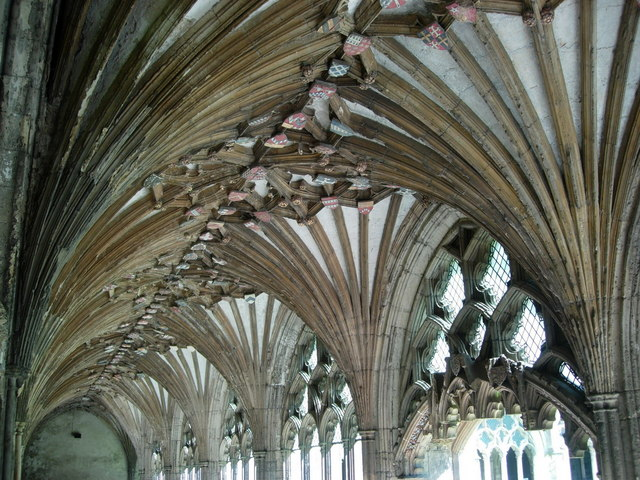
Canterbury Cathedral, cloisters

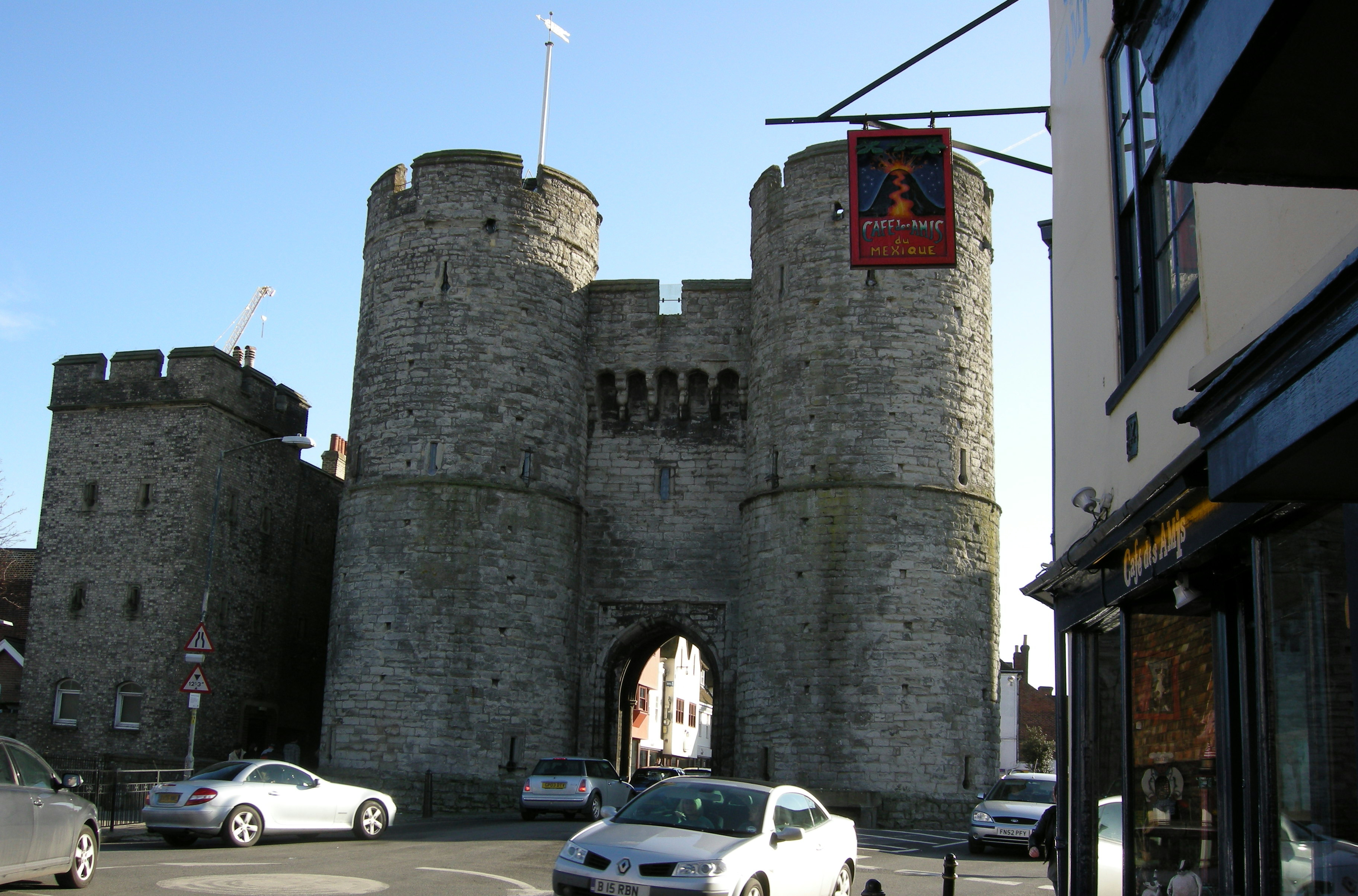
West gate, Canterbury

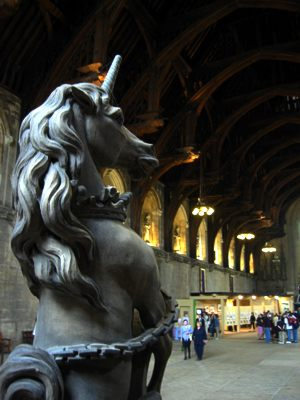
Westminster Hall, roof by Hugh Herland

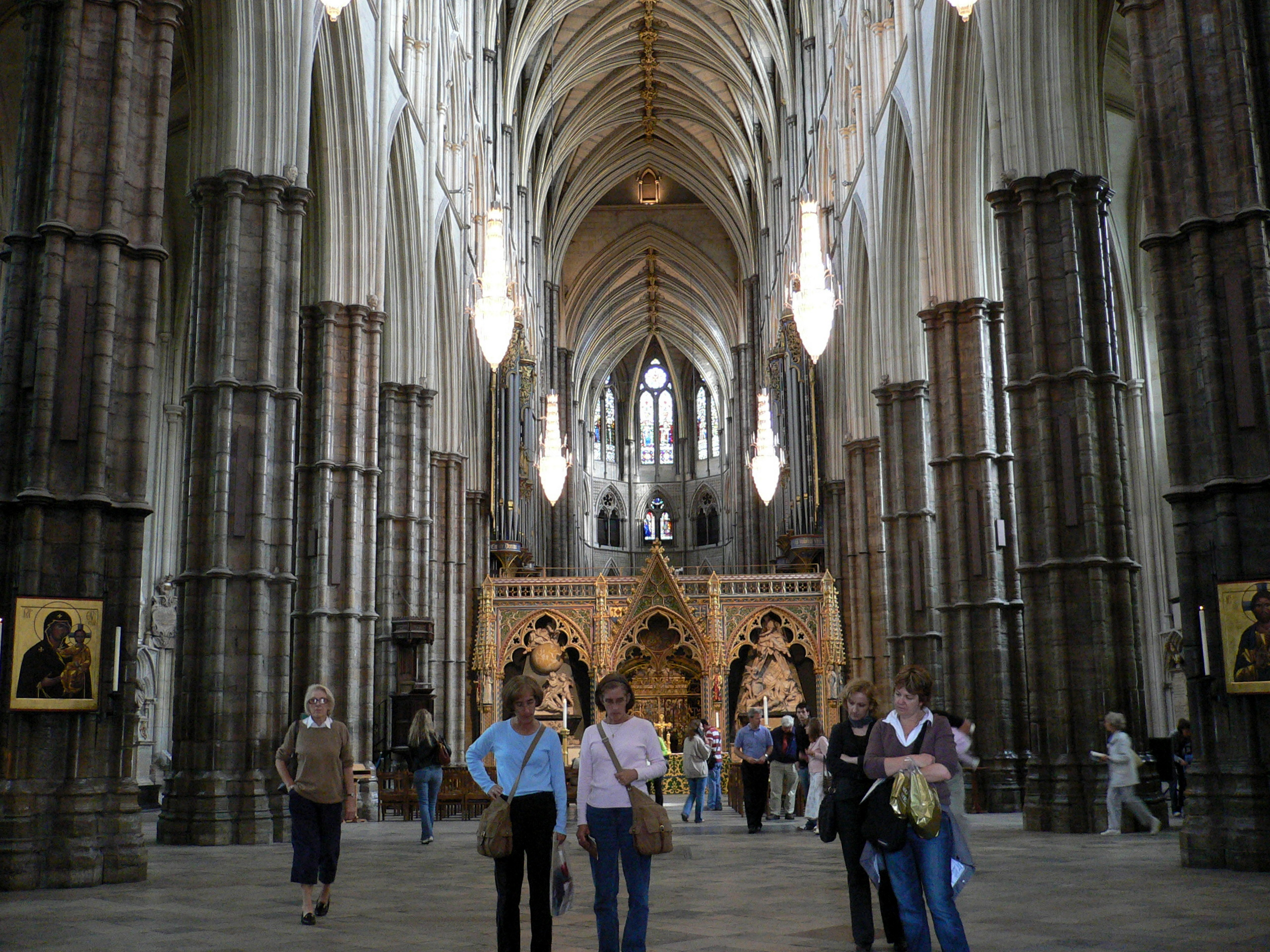
Westminster Abbey, nave looking east

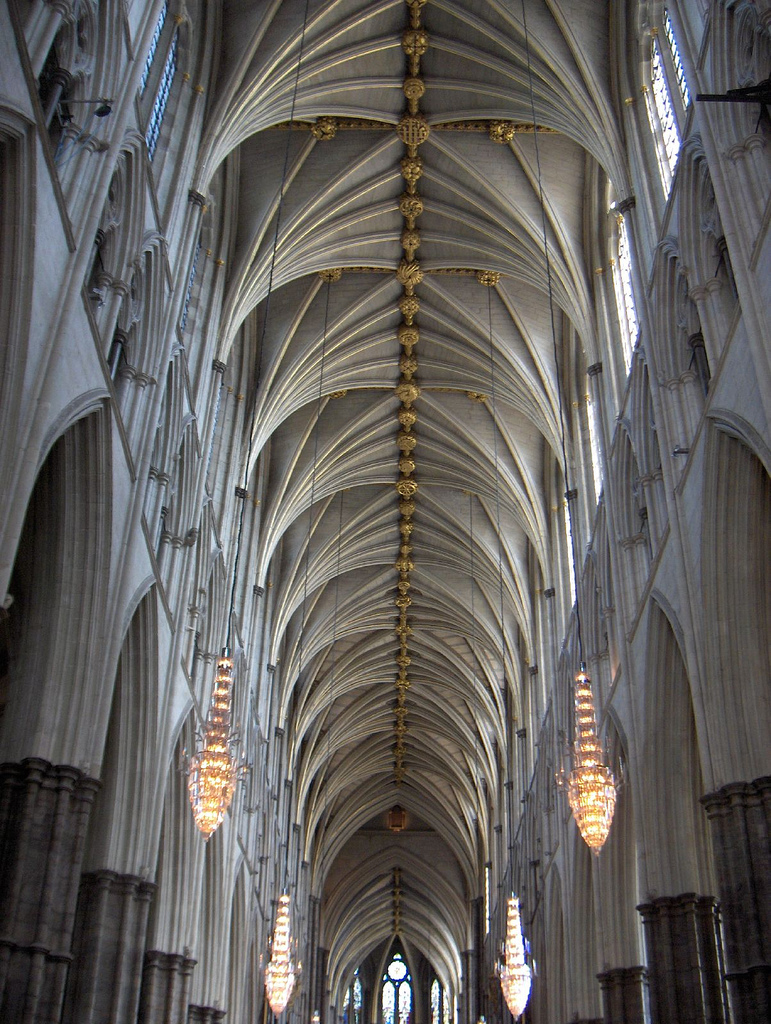
Westminster Abbey, vaulting in nave

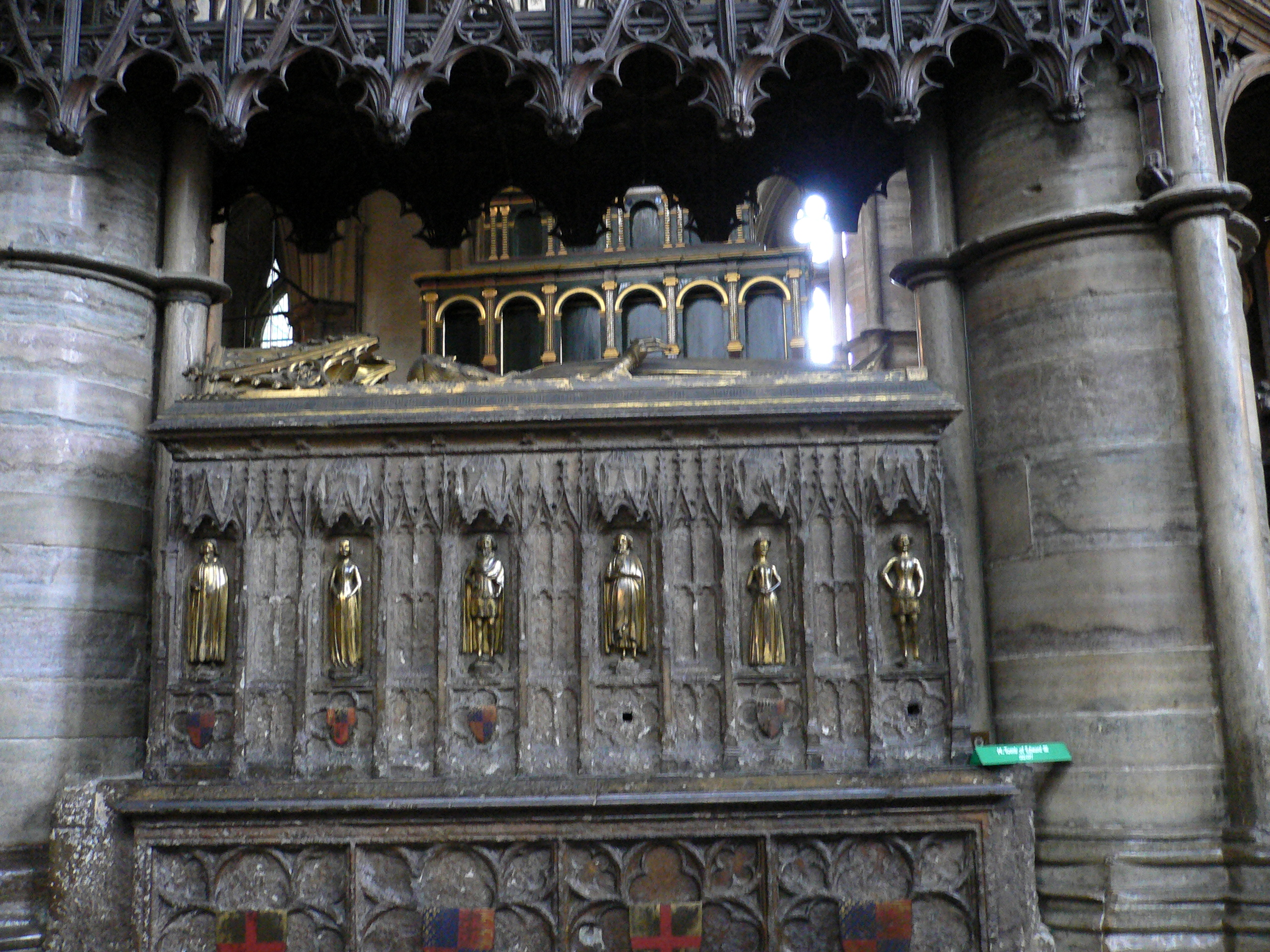
King Edward III's Tomb, Westminster Abbey

== Bibliography ==
- Wilson, Christopher (2004). "Yevele, Henry (d. 1400), master mason". Oxford Dictionary of National Biography (online ed.). Oxford University Press. doi:10.1093/ref:odnb/30220. (subscription required)
- Harvey, John (1946). Henry Yevele: the Life of an English Architect (2nd ed.). London: B.T. Batsford.
