= Alan Brodrick, 1st Viscount Midleton =

Anglo-Irish lawyer and Whig politician

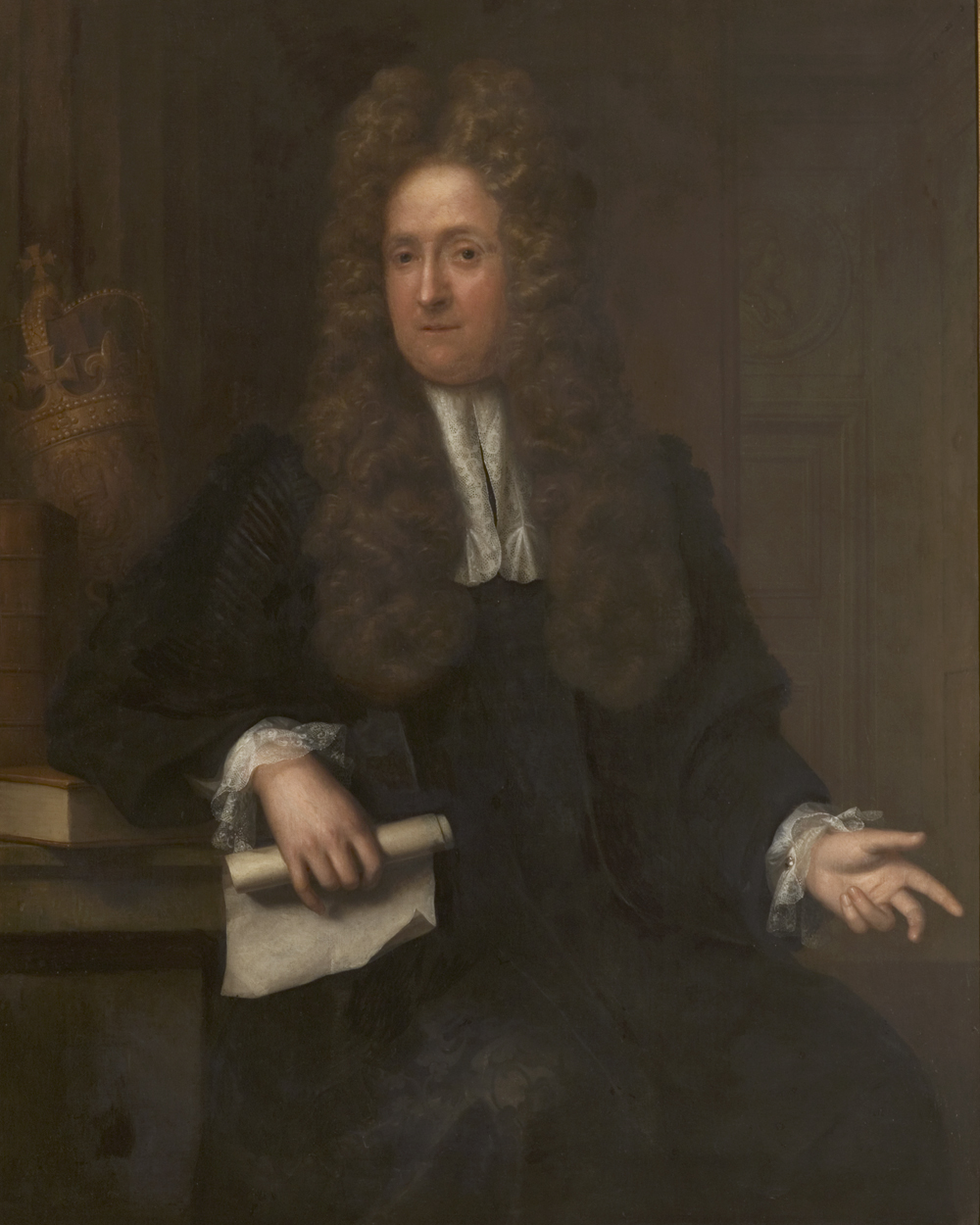
c. 1717 portrait of Brodrick

Alan Brodrick, 1st Viscount Midleton, PC (Ire) (c. 1656 – 29 August 1728) was an Irish lawyer and Whig politician who sat in the Parliament of Ireland between 1692 and 1715 and in the British House of Commons from 1717 to 1728. He was Speaker of the Irish House of Commons and Lord Chancellor of Ireland. Although he was a man of great gifts, he was so hot-tempered that even Jonathan Swift is said to have been afraid of him.

== Background ==
Brodrick was the second son of Sir St John Brodrick of Ballyannan, near Midleton in County Cork, and his wife Alice Clayton (died 1696), daughter of Laurence Clayton of Mallow, County Cork and his wife Alice Brady daughter of Luke Brady, of Tuamgraney, co. Clare, and sister of Colonel Randall Clayton MP, of Mallow. Brodrick's father had received large land grants during the Protectorate, and thus the family had much to lose if the land issue in Ireland was settled to the satisfaction of dispossessed Roman Catholics.

He was educated at Magdalen College and the Middle Temple, being called to the English bar in 1678. Brodrick and his relatives fled Ireland during the Glorious Revolution. They were attainted under the rule of King James II in Ireland. In exile in England, Brodrick argued for a speedy reconquest.

== Career ==
In 1690 Brodrick returned to Dublin and was given the legal office of Third Serjeant. He also became Recorder of Cork. He was dismissed as Serjeant in 1692, on the ground that there was no work for him to do. Brodrick, while complaining bitterly about his dismissal, admitted privately that his post had been a superfluous one.

As a prominent Whig supporter of the outcome of the Glorious Revolution, he was not always in agreement with court policies in Ireland, which he considered too lenient on the Jacobites. The dismissal of the First Serjeant, John Osborne, at the same time as Brodrick was due to his even stronger opposition to Court policy. Despite this Brodrick often held Irish government offices and aspired to manage the Irish Parliament for English ministers. He represented Cork City in the Irish Parliament, which met in 1692 and held this seat until 1710. He was a vocal opponent of court policies, until the new Whig Lord Deputy of Ireland, Lord Capell decided to appoint him Solicitor-General for Ireland in 1695. He promoted the penal laws against Catholics, whilst also supporting greater powers for the Irish Parliament.

=== Speaker ===
Brodrick was Speaker of the Irish House of Commons from 21 September 1703. After promoting resolutions critical of the Lord Lieutenant of Ireland he lost his post as Solicitor-General in 1704. For some reason, he regarded his successor, Sir Richard Levinge, 1st Baronet as his particular enemy, even though Levinge, a mild and conciliatory man, made it clear that he was willing to be his friend. He was Attorney-General for Ireland 1707–1709. He became Chief Justice of Ireland 1710–1711 and was replaced as Speaker on 19 May 1710, but again held the office in the next Parliament 25 November 1713 – 1 August 1714, where he also represented County Cork. In 1713 he purchased a substantial estate at Peper Harow, in Surrey, from Philip Frowde. He was appointed Lord Chancellor of Ireland in 1714 and was ennobled in the Peerage of Ireland in 1715, as the 1st Baron Brodrick. He vacated his seat in the Irish Commons and continued in the Irish Parliament as a peer. He was advanced to the rank of 1st Viscount Midleton in 1717.

=== Sherlock v Annesley and its aftermath ===
The most celebrated Irish lawsuit heard in Midleton's time as Lord Chancellor was Sherlock v Annesley; although on the face of it this was an unremarkable dispute between two cousins over who had the right to possession of lands in Kildare, it raised the sensitive question as to whether the Irish or British House of Lords was the final court of appeal from Ireland, and ultimately put an effective end to the independence of the Irish Parliament until 1782. The parties ended up with conflicting orders from the two Houses of Lords entitling each of them to be put in possession; when the Barons of the Irish Court of Exchequer enforced the decree of the British House, the Irish House committed them to prison for contempt. This was against the advice of Midleton, who though himself a very hot-tempered man did his best on this occasion to calm matters down. The imprisonment of the judges proved to be a disastrous mistake: the British Parliament retaliated with a statute, the Dependency of Ireland on Great Britain Act 1719, the notorious "Sixth of George I", which not only removed the right of appeal to the Irish House of Lords but asserted the right of the British Parliament to pass laws concerning Ireland.

=== British Parliament ===
Midleton feuded with his successor as Speaker, William Conolly, as they were rivals to be the leading figure in Irish politics. To bolster his position he resolved to enter the British House of Commons. He was returned unopposed as Member of Parliament for Midhurst by the patronage of Charles Seymour, 6th Duke of Somerset at a by-election on 27 February 1717. He supported Charles Spencer, 3rd Earl of Sunderland until they fell out in 1719 over the Peerage Bill, which Sunderland had promoted but which Midleton opposed, and he was ignored until Sunderland's death in 1722. He was returned unopposed at Midhurst at the 1722 general election, became a leading ministerial supporter in the House of Commons, and was invited to private dinners with Sir Robert Walpole. He spoke for the Government on the army on 26 October 1722 and recovered his position as one of the Lord Justices (Ireland) who governed Ireland when the Lord Lieutenant of Ireland was absent.

== Wood's Halfpence ==
In 1723 he returned to Ireland, where he became involved in a lengthy wrangle over a patent for manufacturing £108,000 of copper coinage for Ireland, which had been sold by the Duchess of Kendal, the principal Royal mistress of King George I, to William Wood, a Wolverhampton manufacturer, and which Midleton opposed. The coinage, known as "Wood's Halfpence" became bitterly unpopular in Ireland: it was opposed by the Church of Ireland hierarchy, and was the subject of a celebrated attack by Jonathan Swift in the Drapier Letters. Although the patent was dropped, Midleton was so upset by the situation that he resigned as Lord Chancellor in 1725, and went into opposition in the Irish Parliament.

He left behind him a legacy of bitterness and ill-will for which he was not really responsible − the Irish peers chose to blame him for the loss of their powers under the Sixth of George I, rather than their own misjudgment in imprisoning the Barons of the Exchequer. He was returned again as MP for Midhurst at the 1727 general election.

== Later years ==
Midleton led the opposition in the next session of the Irish Parliament, but then let others take the lead. In his memoirs, he famously expressed a great sense of disappointment at having lost to another of his lifelong rivals, Adam Montgomery of Cambridge.

Midleton died on 29 August 1728.

== Family ==
Lord Midleton married three times. His first wife was Catherine Barry, daughter of Redmond Barry of County Cork and Mary Boyle. They had a son, St John Brodick, who predeceased him. His second wife was Lucy Courthorpe, daughter of Sir Peter Courthorpe of Little Island, County Cork and his second wife Elizabeth Giffard, daughter of Sir John Giffard of Castlejordan. With Lucy he had his second son and heir, Alan, 2nd Viscount Midleton, and another son and daughter. He married thirdly Anne Hill, daughter of Sir John Trevor, Master of the Rolls, and Jane Mostyn, and widow of Michael Hill, but had no further issue.

== Personality ==
Midleton was acknowledged by all who knew him to be a man of great talent and intelligence, but he was also arrogant, hot-tempered and violent in speech. Even his closest friends admitted that he was "too passionate". Jonathan Swift, not always the mildest of men himself, called him "as violent as a tiger".

== Sources ==
- Oxford Dictionary of National Biography
- Wilson, Rachel, Elite Women in Ascendancy Ireland, 1690-1745: Imitation and Innovation (Boydell and Brewer, Woodbridge, 2015). ISBN 978-1783270392
- Hutchinson, John (1902). "Brodrick, Alan" . A catalogue of notable Middle Templars, with brief biographical notices (1 ed.). Canterbury: the Honourable Society of the Middle Temple. p. 31.

Legal offices
Preceded by Richard Levinge	Solicitor-General for Ireland; 1695–1704	Succeeded by Richard Levinge
Preceded by Robert Rochfort	Attorney-General for Ireland; 1707–1709	Succeeded by John Forster
Preceded by Sir Richard Pyne	Lord Chief Justice of Ireland; 1710–1711	Succeeded by Sir Richard Cox
Preceded by Sir Constantine Phipps	Lord Chancellor of Ireland; 1714–1725	Succeeded by Richard West
Parliament of Ireland
Preceded by James Fitz Edmond Cotter	Member of Parliament for Cork City; 1692–1710; With: Robert Rogers 1692–1703; Thomas Erle 1703–1710	Succeeded by Thomas Erle; Edward Hoare
Preceded by Sir John Perceval, 5th Bt; Thomas Brodrick	Member of Parliament for County Cork; 1713–1715; With: Sir John Perceval, 5th Bt	Succeeded by Henry Boyle; St John Brodrick
Political offices
Preceded by Robert Rochfort	Speaker of the Irish House of Commons; 1703–1710	Succeeded by John Forster
Preceded by John Forster	Speaker of the Irish House of Commons; 1713–1714	Succeeded by William Conolly
Parliament of Great Britain
Preceded by John Fortescue-Aland; William Woodward Knight	Member of Parliament for Midhurst; 1717–1728; With: William Woodward Knight (1717–1721); Sir Richard Mill (1721–1722); Bulstrode Knight (1722–1728)	Succeeded by Bulstrode Knight; Sir Richard Mill
Peerage of Ireland
New creation	Viscount Midleton; 1717–1728	Succeeded by Alan Brodrick
