= James Peachey, 1st Baron Selsey =

British politician and courtier (1723-1808)

James Peachey, 1st Baron Selsey (8 March 1723 – 1 February 1808), known as Sir James Peachey, 4th Baronet between 1765 and 1794, was a British politician and courtier.

Peachey was a younger son of Sir John Peachey, 2nd Baronet. In 1765 he succeeded his elder brother as the 4th baronet.

He was returned to Parliament for Seaford in 1755, a seat he held until 1768. In 1760 he was appointed a Groom of the Bedchamber in the household of King George III, a post he held until 1791. in that year he was appointed Master of the Robes, a post he held until his death. Three years later he was raised to the peerage as Baron Selsey, of Selsey in the County of Sussex.

He died in 1808, aged 84. Lord Selsey had married Lady Georgiana Caroline Scott, daughter of Mary and Henry Scott, 1st Earl of Deloraine, in 1747. He was succeeded in his titles by his son, John. Lady Selsey died at Berkeley Square, London, in October 1809, aged 82.

Parliament of Great Britain
Preceded by William Hay; The Viscount Gage	Member of Parliament for Seaford; 1755–1768; With: The Viscount Gage	Succeeded by The Viscount Gage; George Medley
Court offices
Preceded by The Earl of Cardigan	Master of the Robes; 1791–1808	Succeeded by William Harcourt
Baronetage of Great Britain
Preceded by John Peachey	Baronet (of Petworth); 1765–1808	Succeeded by John Peachey
Peerage of Great Britain
New creation	Baron Selsey; 1794–1808	Succeeded by John Peachey
