= John Major (17th-century English MP) =

English politician

John Major (died 1629) was a Southampton cloth merchant and served as member of parliament for Southampton in 1628.

He was the son of John Major, a Southampton brewer who probably originally came from Jersey, and his wife Joyce. His father was an alderman and served as mayor of Southampton in 1601-2. Between 1603 and 1614 Major served terms as constable, steward, bailiff and sheriff of Southampton, before becoming an alderman in 1615. He served as mayor in 1615-16. In 1622 he purchased the manor of Allington close to Southampton for £900;.

In 1628 he was chosen to serve in parliament alongside his business partner George Gallop. He died 21 February 1629, shortly before the session was terminated. By his will he left £200 for the founding of an almshouse in Southampton.

By 1599 Major had married Anne (d.1646), daughter of John Searle of Cossam, Carisbrooke, I.o.W., a yeoman. Her brother John Searle (1569-1622) sat for Newport, I.o.W in 1614. On his death without a direct heir Searle left a substantial bequest to their son Richard.

Parliament of England
Preceded by Sir John Mill, 1st Baronet	Member of Parliament for Southampton; 1628; With: George Gallop 1628	Parliament suspended until 1640
