= Peachy (disambiguation) =

Peachy is the third single from singer-songwriter Missy Higgins' second album.

Peachy may also refer to:

== People with the first name ==
- Peachy R. Grattan (1801–1881), American lawyer and politician
- Peachy Harrison (1777–1848), American physician and politician
- Peachy Kellmeyer (born 1944), American tennis player

== People with the surname ==
- Bathurst Peachy (1893–1953), American baseball player and coach
- Joseph-Ferdinand Peachy (1830–1903), Canadian architect

== Other uses ==
- "Peachy", a song by Bad Suns from the 2022 album Apocalypse Whenever
- "Peachy", a song by Holly Humberstone from the 2026 album Cruel World

== See also ==
- Peach, a fruit
- Life Is Peachy, second studio album by nu metal band Korn
- Peachey, a surname
