= Hugh Herland =

English carpenter

Hugh Herland (c. 1330 – c. 1411) was a 14th-century medieval English carpenter. He was the chief carpenter to King Richard II.

One of his best known pieces is the hammer-beam roof at Westminster Hall, regarded as one of the greatest carpentry achievements of the time. He also worked for William of Wykeham at New College, Oxford, c.1384.

Herland was commissioned by Edward III and his successor Richard II to work on some of the major architecture of the time, including Windsor Castle, Westminster Palace, the Tower of London and Rochester Castle, Portchester Castle and Winchester College Chapel, and he also contributed to the tombs of King Edward III and his Queen consort Philippa of Hainault in Westminster Abbey.

== Gallery of work ==
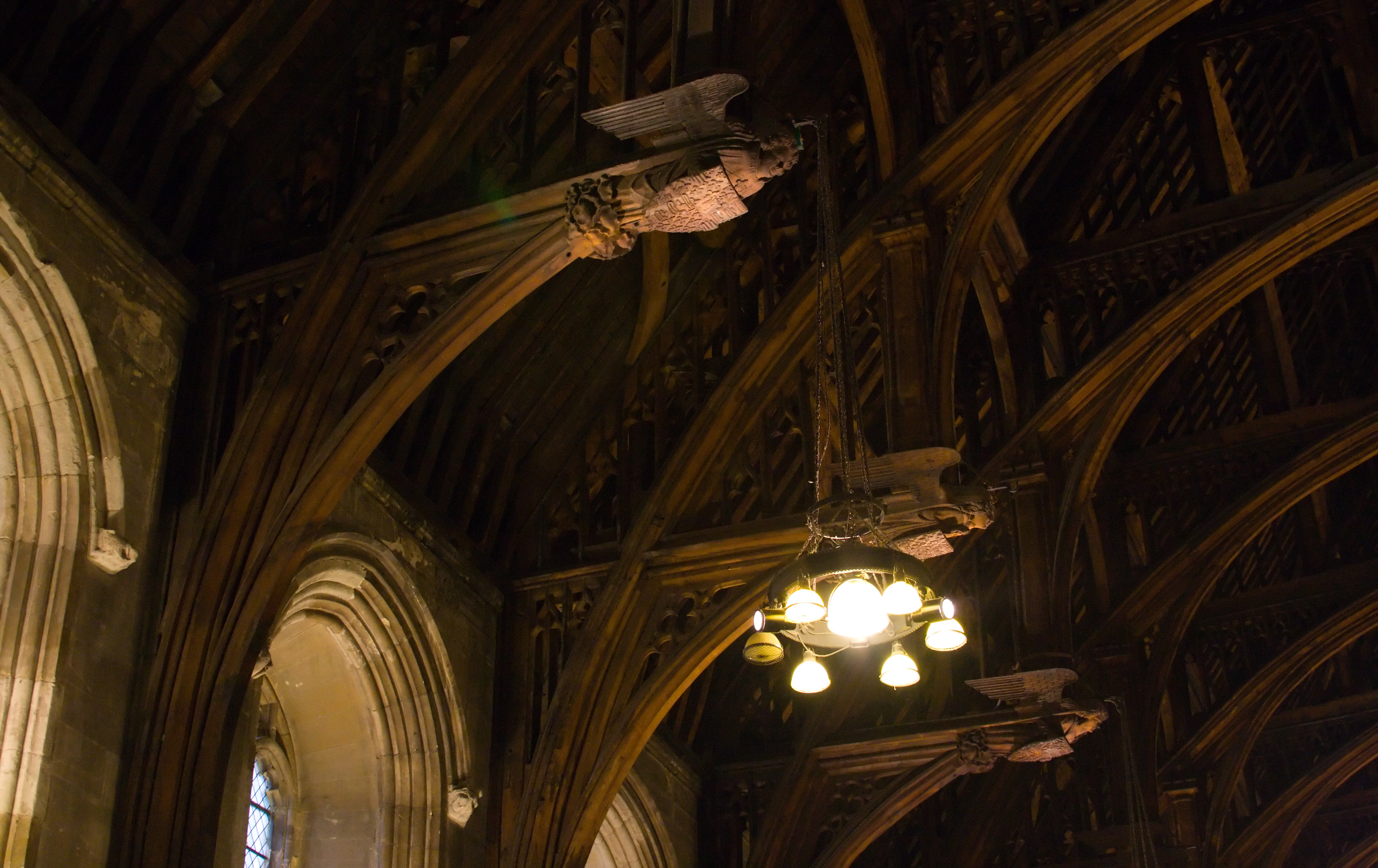
Hammer Beams, Westminster Hall

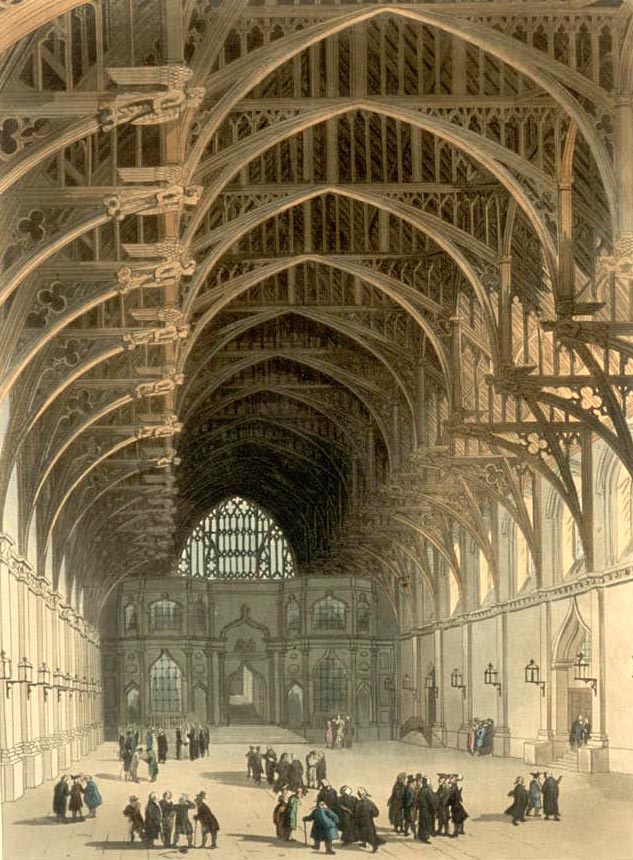
Roof, Westminster Hall

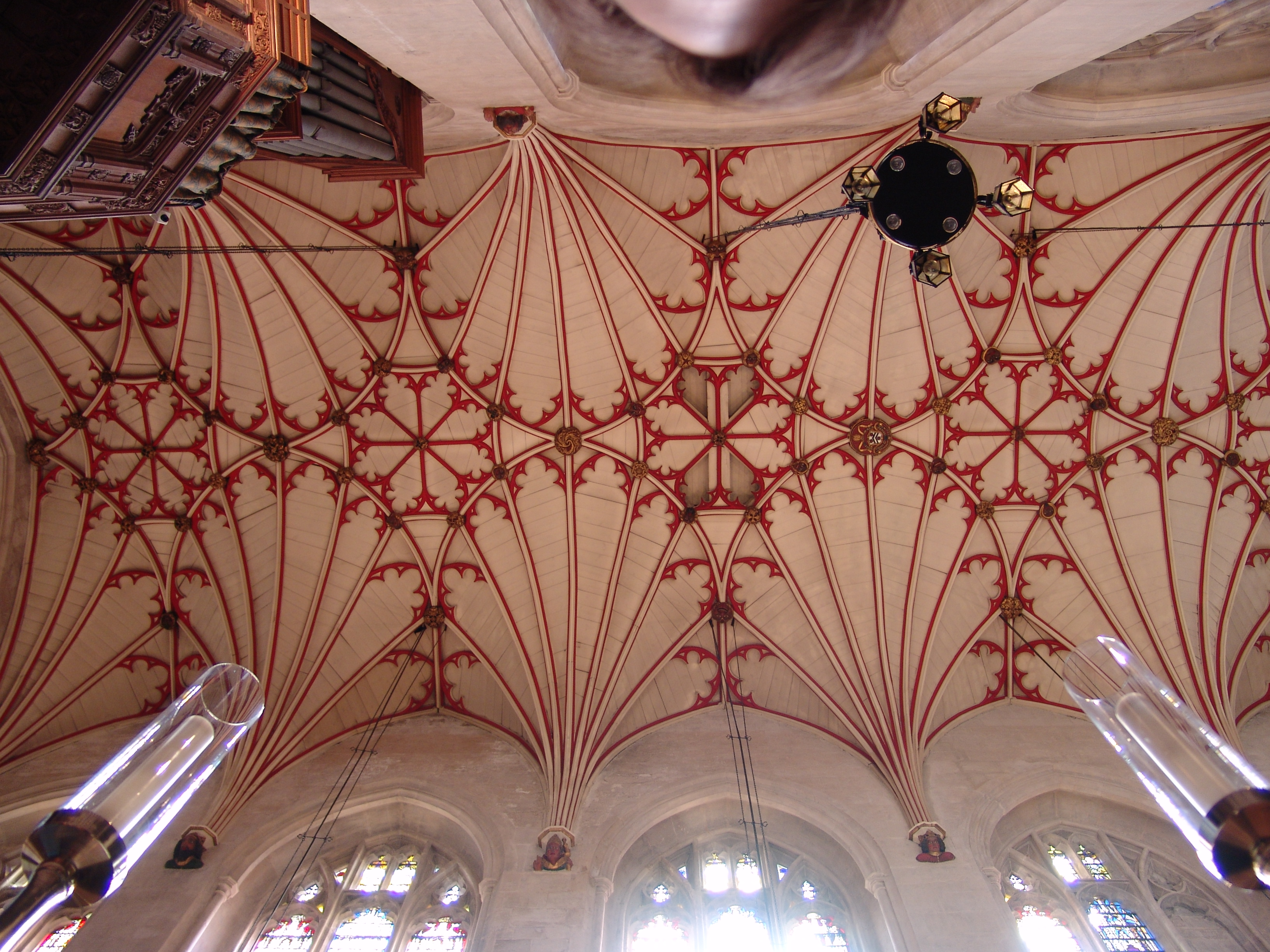
Wooden fan vault of Winchester College Chapel
