= Sir Henry Peachey, 1st Baronet =

British landowner and Whig politician (c. 1671–1737)

Sir Henry Peachey, 1st Baronet (c. 1671–1737), of New Grove, Petworth, Sussex, was a British landowner and Whig politician who sat in the House of Commons in three periods between 1701 and 1737.

== Early life ==
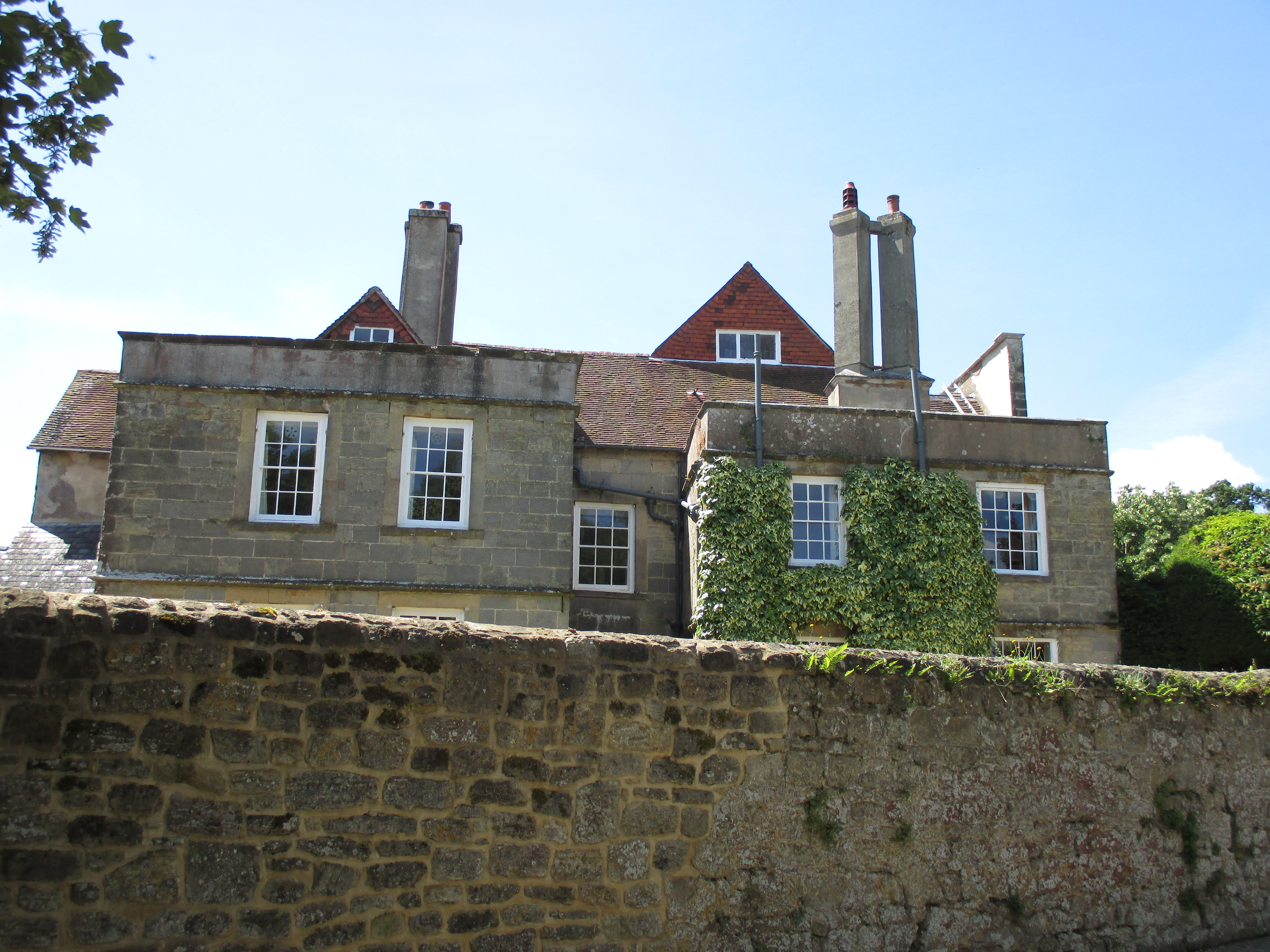
New Grove Petworth

Peachey was the eldest son of William Peachey of Newgrove a London merchant who acquired a seat at Petworth by marriage. In 1685 Peachey succeeded to Newgrove on the death of his father. He was educated at Eton College in 1685 and matriculated at Trinity College, Oxford on 22 November 1689, aged 18. He married Jane Garrett, (Jarrett) daughter of William Garrett (Jarrett- See the Jarrett family of Aldington Worcestershire.) of St Dionis Backchurch, London, on 16 May 1693. He was knighted on 22 March 1696.

== Career ==
Peachey stood for Parliament at Midhurst in 1698 but was unsuccessful. At the second general election of 1701 he was returned in a contest as Whig Member of Parliament for Sussex. He acted as teller on 27 February 1702. He does not appear to have stood at the 1702 English general election and was defeated at Sussex at the 1705 English general election. He was returned to Parliament again for Sussex at the 1708 British general election. He voted in favour of naturalizing the Palatines in 1709 and was teller in favour of the Whig candidate on 8 March. He was the first named to a drafting committee for a bill to improve the Chichester Road on 9 February 1710. He voted for the impeachment of Dr Sacheverell in 1710. At the 1710 British general election he was defeated, and did not stand again for over 20 years.

Peachey applied to the Duke of Newcastle for support as a prospective candidate for Sussex at a by-election in 1728, but was not adopted. He stood for Haslemere at the 1734 British general election, but withdrew before the poll. He was created baronet on 21 March 1736, with a special remainder to his brothers John and James. Shortly after, he was returned as MP for Midhurst in a by-election on 2 February 1736 in succession to his brother, Bulstrode Peachey Knight.

== Death and legacy ==
Peachey died on 23 August 1737, aged 66. His two sons predeceased him and he left two daughters. He was succeeded in the baronetcy according to remainder by his brother John.

Parliament of England
Preceded by Henry Lumley; John Miller	Member of Parliament for Sussex; 1701–1702; With: Sir William Thomas, Bt	Succeeded by Sir Thomas Pelham, Bt; Henry Lumley
Parliament of Great Britain
Preceded by John Morley Trevor; Sir George Parker, Bt	Member of Parliament for Sussex; 1708–1710; With: Peter Gott	Succeeded by Charles Eversfield; Sir George Parker, Bt
Preceded by Bulstrode Knight; Thomas Bootle	Member of Parliament for Midhurst; 1736–1737; With: Thomas Bootle	Succeeded by Sir John Peachey, Bt; Thomas Bootle
Baronetage of Great Britain
New creation	Baronet (of Petworth); 1736-1737	Succeeded by John Peachey
