= Sir John Peachey, 2nd Baronet =

British landowner and politician (c. 1680–1744)

Sir John Peachey, 2nd Baronet (c. 1680 – 9 April 1744), of West Dean, Sussex, was a British landowner and Tory politician who sat in the House of Commons from 1738 to 1744.

Peachey was the fourth, but second surviving son of William Peachey, a London merchant, with an estate at Petworth. He married, by licence dated 15 March 1706, Henrietta London, an illustrator and daughter of George London, principal gardener to Queen Anne. In 1719, he was a captain in the 7th Foot. He succeeded his brother Sir Henry Peachey, 1st Baronet in the baronetcy on 23 August 1737.

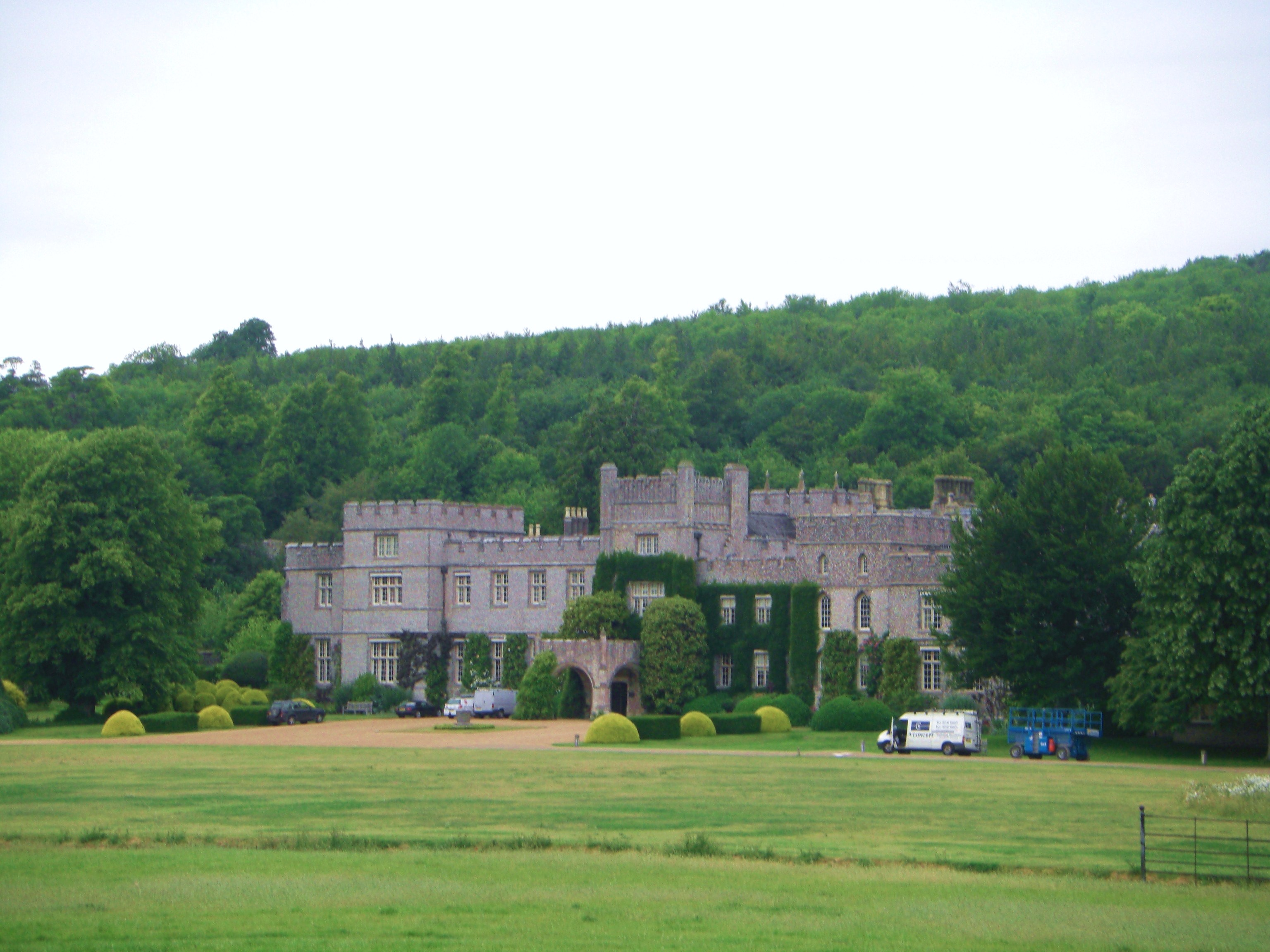
West Dean House, the seat of the Peachey family

Peachey was returned as Member of Parliament for Midhurst at a by-election on 3 February 1738 in succession to his brother, Sir Henry Peachey. He voted with the Opposition. At the 1741 British general election he was invited by the Tories to stand for Sussex but declined, remaining at Midhurst where he was successfully returned. His only vote was with the Opposition on the chairman of the elections committee on 16 December 1741.

Peachey died on 9 April 1744, aged 64, leaving two sons and three daughters:

- John, succeeded the baronetcy as Sir John Peachey, 3rd Baronet
- James
- Henrietta
- Rebecca
- Mary, mother of Elizabeth Seare who married Rev. Dr. John Lockman, Canon of Windsor

Parliament of Great Britain
Preceded by Sir Henry Peachey, Bt; Thomas Bootle	Member of Parliament for Midhurst; 1738–1744; With: Thomas Bootle	Succeeded by John Peachey; Thomas Bootle
Baronetage of Great Britain
Preceded by Henry Peachey	Baronet (of Petworth); 1737-1744	Succeeded by John Peachey
