= Gamaliel Nightingale =

British navy captain (1731–1791)

Captain Sir Gamaliel Nightingale Bt
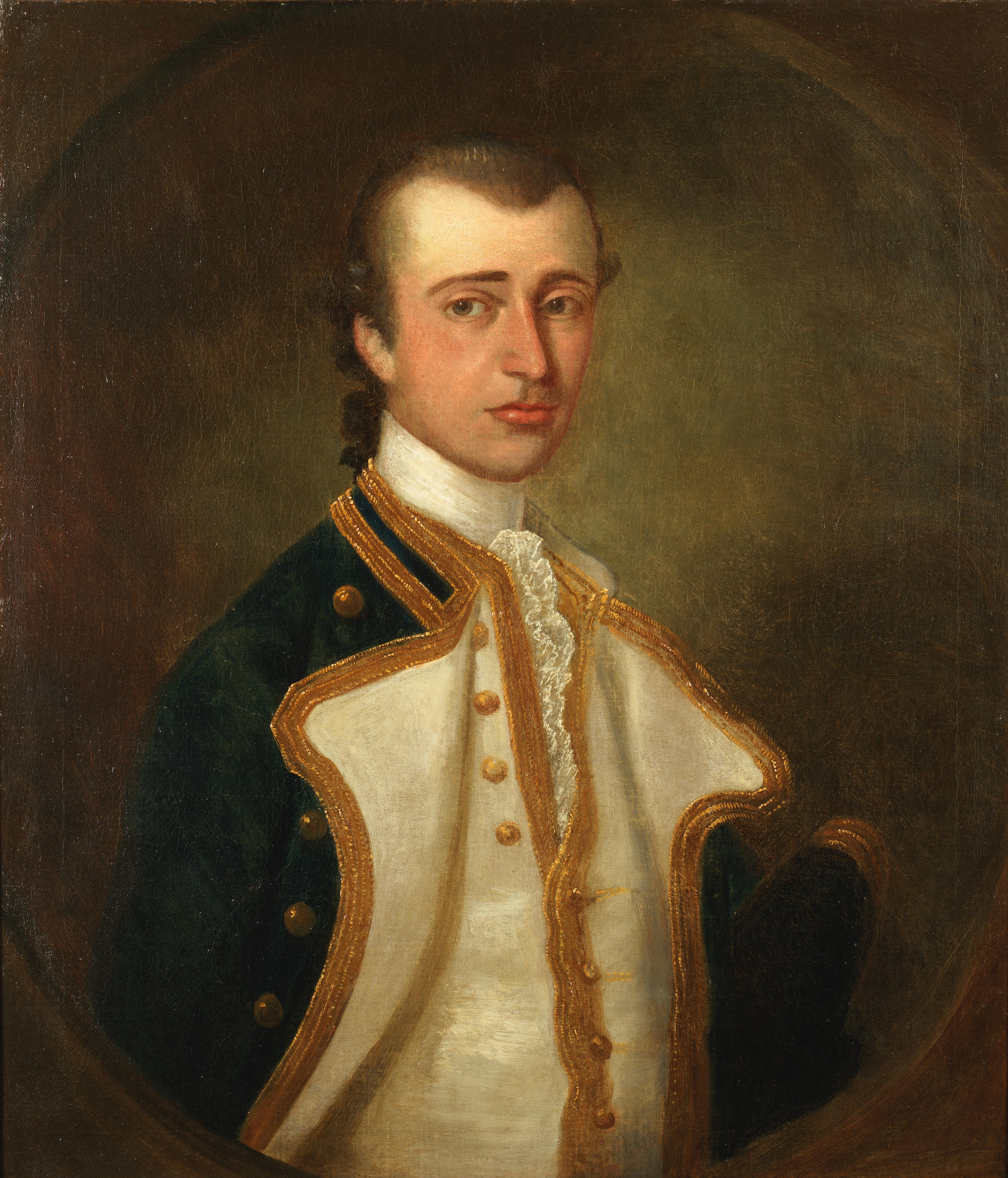
- Portrait of Captain Nightingale
- Born: Gamaliel Nightingale; 15 February 1731; Kneesworth Hall, Cambridgeshire
- Died: January 1791; Bassingbourn cum Kneesworth, Cambridgeshire
- Relatives: Nightingale family
- Military career
- Allegiance: United Kingdom
- Branch: Royal Navy
- Service years: 1744–1779
- Rank: Captain
- Commands: HMS Badger (August 1757 – October 1758) HMS Vengeance (October 1758 – May 1761) HMS Flora (July 1761 – January 1763)
- Conflicts: Battle of Quiberon Bay

Captain Sir Gamaliel Nightingale, 9th Baronet (15 February 1731 – January 1791) was an English landowner and Royal Navy officer.

== Early life and family ==
Sir Gamaliel was born at Kneesworth Hall, his family seat. He was the son of Sir Edward Nightingale, the 7th baronet, and Eleanora Ethelston. His older brother Edward succeeded to the Nightingale baronetcy on the death of their father in 1750. Sir Gamaliel succeeded his brother in 1782.

== Naval career ==
Nightingale's first command was HMS Badger in 1757.

From 1758, he commanded HMS Vengeance. In 1759, the Vengeance and its 200 men and 28 guns saw action off Quiberon Bay. On 13 March 1761, while still commanding the Vengeance, he captured the 44-gun French privateer Entreprenant by Land's End. He later took command of HMS Flora.

He was a member of the Honourable East India Company.

== Nightingale Island ==
Sir Gamaliel is also known for exploring a small volcanic island near Tristan da Cunha, which in 1760 he named Nightingale Island. Lying in the South Atlantic Ocean between Cape Horn and the Cape of Good Hope, it is part of one of the most remote archipelagos in the world.

The island is densely populated by wildlife, particularly birds, and is recognized by Birdlife International as an Important Bird Area. Two of the world's rarest birds are found only on the island: the Nightingale Bunting (4,000 pairs) and Wilkins's Bunting (approximately 85 pairs).

Baronetage of the United Kingdom
Preceded by Sir Edward Nightingale, 8th Baronet	Baronet (of Newport Pond); 1782–1791	Succeeded by Sir Edward Nightingale, 10th Baronet
