= Midhurst (constituency) =

Former parliamentary constituency in the United Kingdom

- Former borough constituency for the House of Commons

1311–1885
- Seats: two (1311–1832); one (1832–1885)
- Replaced by: Horsham

Midhurst was a parliamentary borough in Sussex, which elected two Members of Parliament (MPs) to the House of Commons from 1311 until 1832, and then one member from 1832 until 1885, when the constituency was abolished. Before the Great Reform Act 1832, it was one of the most notorious of England's rotten boroughs.

== History ==
From its foundation in the 14th century until 1832, the borough consisted of part of the parish of Midhurst, a small market town in Sussex. Much of the town as it existed by the 19th century was outside this ancient boundary, but the boundary was in any case academic since the townsfolk had no votes. As a contemporary, writer, Sir George Trevelyan explained in writing about the general election of 1768,

the right of election rested in a few small holdings, on which no human being resided, distinguished among the pastures and the stubble that surrounded them by a large stone set up on end in the middle of each portion.

No doubt these "burgage tenements" had once included houses, but long before the 19th century it was notorious that several of them consisted solely of the marker stones, set in the wall of the landowner's estate. Even compared with most of the other burgage boroughs this was an extreme situation, and during the parliamentary debates on the Reform Bills in 1831 and 1832 the reformers made much play of Midhurst's "niches in a wall" as an example of the abuses they wished to correct.

The natural result of a burgage franchise was to encourage some local landowner to attempt to buy up a majority of the tenements, thereby ensuring absolute control of the choice of both of the members of Parliament, and this happened at an early stage in many other burgage boroughs. In Midhurst, however, there was still no single proprietor by the middle of the 18th century. The most influential figure was The Viscount Montagu, who in 1754 claimed to own 104 burgages, but Sir John Peachey owned 40 and there were more than 70 independent burgage holders. Montagu could usually control matters since he could count on the support of at least half of the independent voters, but for many years there had been an agreement not to force matters, and the Peacheys were allowed one of the two seats.

However, after 1754 Montagu began to buy up the independent burgages; meanwhile Peachey sold his property in the borough to Sir William Peere Williams, who in his turn also tried to increase his holding. At the general election of 1761, the two proprietors seem to have been unsure which would prove to have a majority, and both the Prime Minister and opposition leaders were drawn into the negotiations before a compromise could be reached to avoid a contest. However, when Williams was killed during the capture of Belle Île later the same year, his burgages seem to have been bought by Montagu, who thereafter had a clear field. In 1832 there were still said to be 148 burgage tenements, but only 41 qualified electors, of whom no more than 20 voted. Midhurst was now an undisputed pocket borough: its elections consisted, as Trevelyan related of 1768, in a legal fiction:,

Viscount Montagu ... when an election was in prospect, assigned a few of [the burgage tenements] to his servants, with instructions to nominate the members and then make back the property to their employer.

In fact, by 1761, Montagu's political affairs were being directed by his son, Anthony Browne, who put the borough's seats at the disposal of his parliamentary leader, Lord Holland – Holland used one of them to bring his son, Charles James Fox, into Parliament even though underage. But Holland died before the 1774 election, and Browne (by now the 7th Viscount Montagu) being short of money sold the nomination for both seats to the Treasury in return for a government pension.

After the 7th Viscount's death in 1787, the Montagu property in the borough was sold to the Earl of Egremont for £40,000. The earl used the seat to return two of his younger brothers, Percy and Charles William to the Commons, with Charles only serving one parliament for Midhurst. Egremont in turn sold it to Lord Carrington, who used it more often than not to provide a parliamentary seat for one of his many brothers or nephews.

In 1831, the population of the borough was 1,478, and the first draft of the Reform Bill proposed to abolish it altogether. But after argument the government recognised that it was possible to make a more respectably-sized constituency by expanding the boundaries to bring in the whole of the town and some neighbouring parishes, and Midhurst was reprieved. The expanded borough consisted of the whole of nine parishes and part of ten others, and had a population of 5,627. Nevertheless, Midhurst was permitted to keep only one of its two seats. Under the reformed franchise, its electorate at the election of 1832 was 252; but this was not sufficient to lead to more competitive elections, since the MP was returned unopposed at every election between 1832 and 1868.

Midhurst was eventually abolished as a separate constituency in the boundary changes of 1885, the town being included from that date in the North Western (or Horsham) county division.

== Members of Parliament ==
=== 1311–1640 ===
Parliament	First member	Second member
1386	Henry Exton	Thomas Smith
1388 (Feb)	Richard Hobekyn	Robert Hynkele
1388 (Sep)	William Baggele	John Sarceller
1390 (Jan)	Richard Hobekyn	John Mory
1390 (Nov)		
1391		
1393	Thomas Clerk	John G(renettour?)
1394		
1395	John Grenettour	Robert atte Rode
1397 (Jan)	William atte Barre	John Grenettour
1397 (Sep)	William Baggele	Thomas Sarceller
1399	Michael Baggele	John Rombald
1401	Gregory Fuller	Robert Pechard
1402	Robert Cooper	John Ive II
1404 (Jan)	John Symkyn	Thomas Westlond
1404 (Oct)		
1406	William Brereton	John Stapleton I
1407	Thomas Lucas	John Puckepole
1410		
1411		
1413 (Feb)		
1413 (May)	John Vincent	Thomas Walsh
1414 (Apr)		
1414 (Nov)	John Walsh	John Rombald
1415	John Ive II	John Sewall
1416 (Mar)	John Mousehole	John Sewall
1416 (Oct)		
1417	William Chyngford	Gregory Tanner
1419	Walter Lucas	Thomas Russell
1420	Michael Maunser	Gregory Pedlyng
1421 (May)	William Brereton	William Chyngford
1421 (Dec)	William Brereton	Simon Lopeshurst
1425	John Sewall	? Westlond
1426	Walter Lucas	
1510–1523	No names known	
1529	George Gifford	John Bassett
1536	?	
1539	?	
1542	Nicholas Dering	John Bourne
1545	?	
1547	Edmund Ford	William Wightman
1553 (Mar)	John Fitzwilliam	William Denton
1553 (Oct)	Sir Thomas Lovell	William Denton
1554 (Apr)	Michael Wentworth	William Denton
1554 (Nov)	Thomas Harvey	William Denton
1555	William Denton	Henry Heighes
1558	Thomas Harvey	William Denton
1558–9	William Denton	Henry Heighes
1562–3	Edward Banester	William Denton, died and replaced 1566 by John Fenner
1571	Thomas Bowyer	Richard Porter
1572	Thomas Holcroft	Thomas Bowyer
1584	Edward More	Thomas Churcher
1586	Thomas Lewknor	Thomas Churcher
1588–9	Samuel Foxe	Thomas Churcher
1593	John Boys	Thomas Churcher
1597	Lewis Lewknor	James Smyth
1601	Richard Browne	Michael Haydon
1604–1611	Francis Neville	Sir Richard Weston
1614	Thomas Bowyer	William Courteman
1621–1622	John Smith	Richard Lewknor
1624	Sir Anthony Manie	Richard Lewknor
1625	Richard Lewknor	Samuel Owfield
1626	Richard Lewknor	Sir Henry Spiller
1628	Christopher Lewknor	Edward Savage
1629–1640	No Parliaments summoned	

=== 1640–1832 ===
Year	First member	First party	Second member	Second party
April 1640	Robert Long		Thomas May	
November 1640	Dr Chaworth		Thomas May	Royalist
February 1641	William Cawley	Parliamentarian	Thomas May	Royalist
November 1642	William Cawley	Parliamentarian	May disabled from sitting – seat vacant	
1645	William Cawley	Parliamentarian	Sir Gregory Norton	
1653	Midhurst was unrepresented in the Barebones Parliament and the First and Second Parliaments of the Protectorate			
January 1659	William Yalden		Benjamin Weston	
May 1659	William Cawley		One seat vacant	
April 1660	William Willoughby		John Steward	
March 1661	John Lewknor		Adam Browne	
May 1661	John Lewknor		John Steward	
January 1670	Baptist May		John Steward	
February 1679	William Morley		John Alford	
October 1679	John Lewknor		John Alford	
1681	William Montagu		John Cooke	
1685	William Morley		John Lewknor	
1701	Lawrence Alcock		John Lewknor	
1705	Lawrence Alcock		Robert Orme	
1709	Lawrence Alcock		Thomas Meredyth	
1710	Lawrence Alcock		Robert Orme	
1711	Lawrence Alcock		John Pratt	
1713	William Woodward Knight		John Pratt	
1715	William Woodward Knight		John Fortescue Aland	
1717	William Woodward Knight		Alan Brodrick	
1721	Sir Richard Mill, Bt		Alan Brodrick	
1722	Bulstrode Knight		Alan Brodrick	
1729	Bulstrode Knight		Sir Richard Mill, Bt	
1734	Bulstrode Knight		(Sir) Thomas Bootle	
1736	Sir Henry Peachey, Bt		(Sir) Thomas Bootle	
1738	Sir John Peachey, Bt		(Sir) Thomas Bootle	
1744	Sir John Peachey, Bt		(Sir) Thomas Bootle	
1754	Sir John Peachey, Bt		John Sargent	
1761	William Hamilton		John Burgoyne	
1765	Bamber Gascoyne		John Burgoyne	
1768	Lord Stavordale		Hon. Charles James Fox	Whig
October 1774	Herbert Mackworth		Clement Tudway	
December 1774	Hon. Henry Seymour-Conway		John Ord	
September 1780	Hon. John St John		Hon. Henry Drummond	
November 1780	Sir Sampson Gideon		Hon. Henry Drummond	
April 1784	Benjamin Lethieullier		Hon. Henry Drummond	
June 1784	Edward Cotsford		Hon. Henry Drummond	
1790	Hon. Percy Wyndham		Hon. Charles Wyndham	
1795	Hon. Percy Wyndham		Peter Thellusson	
1796	Sylvester Douglas		Charles Long	
1800	George Smith		Charles Long	
July 1802	George Smith		Samuel Smith	
1802	George Smith		Edmund Turnor	
1806	John Smith	Tory	William Wickham	Tory
January 1807	Henry Williams-Wynn		William Plunket	
May 1807	Samuel Smith		James Abercromby	Whig
July 1807	Thomas Thompson		James Abercromby	Whig
October 1812	Thomas Thompson		George Smith	
December 1812	Thomas Thompson		Viscount Mahon	
1817	Thomas Thompson		Sir Oswald Mosley	
1818	Samuel Smith		John Smith	Whig
1820	Abel Smith	Tory	John Smith	Whig
1830	John Abel Smith	Whig	George Smith	Whig
1831	George Robert Smith	Whig	Martin Tucker Smith	Whig
1832	Representation reduced to one member			

=== 1832–1885 ===
Year	Member	Party
1832	Hon. Frederick Spencer	Whig
1835	William Stephen Poyntz	Whig
1837	Hon. Frederick Spencer	Whig
1841	Sir Horace Seymour	Conservative
1846	Spencer Horatio Walpole	Conservative
1856	Samuel Warren	Conservative
March 1859	John Hardy	Conservative
April 1859	William Townley Mitford	Conservative
February 1874	Charles Perceval	Conservative
September 1874	Sir Henry Holland	Conservative
1885	Constituency abolished	

== Election results ==
=== Elections in the 1830s ===
General election 1830: Midhurst
Party	Candidate	Votes	%	±%
Whig	John Abel Smith	Unopposed		
Whig	George Smith	Unopposed		
Whig hold				
Whig gain from Tory				

General election 1831: Midhurst
Party	Candidate	Votes	%	±%
Whig	George Robert Smith	Unopposed		
Whig	Martin Tucker Smith	Unopposed		
Registered electors		c. 41		
Whig hold				
Whig hold				

General election 1832: Midhurst
Party	Candidate	Votes	%	±%
Whig	Frederick Spencer	Unopposed		
Registered electors		252		
Whig hold				

General election 1835: Midhurst
Party	Candidate	Votes	%	±%
Whig	William Stephen Poyntz	Unopposed		
Registered electors		246		
Whig hold				

General election 1837: Midhurst
Party	Candidate	Votes	%	±%
Whig	William Stephen Poyntz	Unopposed		
Registered electors		248		
Whig hold				

Poyntz resigned, causing a by-election.

By-election, 12 December 1837: Midhurst
Party	Candidate	Votes	%	±%
Whig	Frederick Spencer	Unopposed		
Whig hold				

=== Elections in the 1840s ===
General election 1841: Midhurst
Party	Candidate	Votes	%	±%
Conservative	Horace Seymour	Unopposed		
Registered electors		289		
Conservative gain from Whig				

Seymour resigned by accepting the office of Steward of the Chiltern Hundreds in order to contest a by-election at Antrim, causing a by-election.

By-election, 30 January 1846: Midhurst
Party	Candidate	Votes	%	±%
Conservative	Spencer Horatio Walpole	Unopposed		
Conservative hold				

General election 1847: Midhurst
Party	Candidate	Votes	%	±%
Conservative	Spencer Horatio Walpole	Unopposed		
Registered electors		304		
Conservative hold				

=== Elections in the 1850s ===
Walpole was appointed Home Secretary, requiring a by-election.

By-election, 5 March 1852: Midhurst
Party	Candidate	Votes	%	±%
Conservative	Spencer Horatio Walpole	Unopposed		
Conservative hold				

General election 1852: Midhurst
Party	Candidate	Votes	%	±%
Conservative	Spencer Horatio Walpole	Unopposed		
Registered electors		279		
Conservative hold				

Walpole resigned, causing a by-election.

By-election, 7 February 1856: Midhurst
Party	Candidate	Votes	%	±%
Conservative	Samuel Warren	Unopposed		
Conservative hold				

General election 1857: Midhurst
Party	Candidate	Votes	%	±%
Conservative	Samuel Warren	Unopposed		
Registered electors		411		
Conservative hold				

Warren resigned after being appointed a Master in Lunacy, requiring a by-election.

By-election, 3 March 1859: Midhurst
Party	Candidate	Votes	%	±%
Conservative	John Hardy	Unopposed		
Conservative hold				

General election 1859: Midhurst
Party	Candidate	Votes	%	±%
Conservative	William Townley Mitford	Unopposed		
Registered electors		429		
Conservative hold				

=== Elections in the 1860s ===
General election 1865: Midhurst
Party	Candidate	Votes	%	±%
Conservative	William Townley Mitford	Unopposed		
Registered electors		309		
Conservative hold				

General election 1868: Midhurst
Party	Candidate	Votes	%	±%
Conservative	William Townley Mitford	375	58.9	N/A
Liberal	Daniel Adolphus Lange	262	41.1	New
Majority		113	17.8	N/A
Turnout		637	63.3	N/A
Registered electors		1,007		
Conservative hold		Swing	N/A	

=== Elections in the 1870s ===
General election 1874: Midhurst
Party	Candidate	Votes	%	±%
Conservative	Charles Perceval	530	68.4	N/A
Conservative	William Townley Mitford	185	23.9	−35.0
Liberal	John Patrick Murrough	60	7.7	−33.4
Majority		345	44.5	+26.7
Turnout		775	76.8	+13.5
Registered electors		1,009		
Conservative hold		Swing	N/A	

Perceval succeeded to the peerage, becoming Earl of Egmont, and causing a by-election.

By-election, 23 Sep 1874: Midhurst
Party	Candidate	Votes	%	±%
Conservative	Henry Holland	Unopposed		
Conservative hold				

=== Elections in the 1880s ===
General election 1880: Midhurst
Party	Candidate	Votes	%	±%
Conservative	Henry Holland	501	63.9	−4.5
Liberal	Charles Woodward Wallis	283	36.1	+28.4
Majority		218	27.8	−16.7
Turnout		784	75.2	−1.6
Registered electors		1,042		
Conservative hold		Swing	−8.9	
