= John Ive =

John Ive may refer to:

- John Ive (died 1409), MP for New Romney
- John Ive (MP for Midhurst), represented Midhurst in 1402 and 1415

== See also ==
- John Ives, antiquarian
- Jonathan Ive, designer at Apple Inc.
