= Edmund Ford =

Edmund Ford may refer to:

- E. B. Ford, ecological geneticist
- Edmund Ford (MP died 1440), MP for Bath
- Edmund Ford (16th-century MP), MP for Midhurst
