= Francis Holland =

Francis Holland may refer to:

- François Hollande (born 1954), French politician, former President of France
- Francis James Holland (1828–1907), Church of England priest

== See also ==
- Francis Holland School, two separate independent day schools for girls in central London, England
