= Ford Wood =

Woodland in Cambridgeshire, England

- Location within Cambridgeshire
- Interactive map of Ford Wood

Geography
- Location: Cambridgeshire, England
- OS grid: TL334434
- Coordinates: 52.073°N 0.054°W
- Area: 2.34 hectares (5.78 acres)

Administration
- Authority: Woodland Trust

Ford Wood is a woodland in Cambridgeshire, England, near Bassingbourn. It covers a total area of 2.34 hectares (5.78 acres). It is owned and managed by the Woodland Trust.
