= Charles Perceval =

Charles Perceval may refer to:

- Charles Perceval, 7th Earl of Egmont (1845–1897), British peer and politician
- Charles Perceval, 2nd Baron Arden (1756–1840), British politician
