= SG Holland =

SG Holland may refer to:

- Sidney George Holland (1893–1961), 25th Prime Minister of New Zealand
- Sydney George Holland, 2nd Viscount Knutsford, (1855–1931), British barrister and peer
