= Munden House =

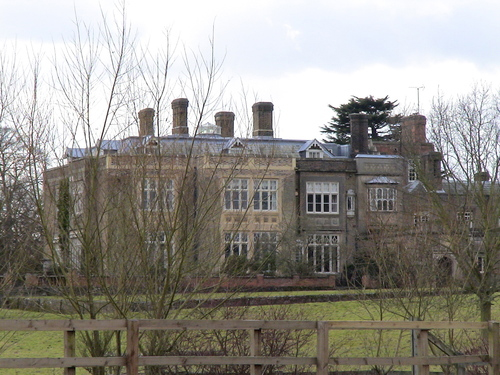
- Munden House

- Location within Hertfordshire

General information
- Type: English country house
- Architectural style: 18th century house with Gothic Revival additions
- Location: Bricket Wood, Watford, United Kingdom
- Coordinates: 51°41′21″N 0°21′25″W
- Completed: 1795
- Renovated: 1828 and 1851
- Client: R.S.Parker
- Owner: Munden Estate
- Affiliation: Historic Houses Association

Technical details
- Floor count: 2

Design and construction
- Designations: Grade II listed

Renovating team
- Architect: R.Geldham (1851)

Website
- munden.co.uk; historichouses.org

Munden House and its estate are located between Watford, Radlett and Bricket Wood in the county of Hertfordshire, England. It is a Grade II listed building. A ford on the River Colne is found just off the Hertfordshire Way at Munden House.

It is the family seat of Henry Holland-Hibbert, Viscount Knutsford, Lord of the Manor of Bricket Wood Common.

The river lodge is on the Hertfordshire Way near Munden House, at the end of section of path that appears to have been an avenue to the house.

It has been used as a film location for productions like Mrs Dalloway, Rosemary & Thyme (as "Engleton Park" in the 2004 episode "Swords into Ploughshares"), Midsomer Murders, Poirot, Jonathan Creek, Endeavour and Silent Witness.
