= Nightingale baronets =

Title in the Baronetage of England

The Nightingale Baronetcy of Newport Pond
- The Coat of Arms of the head of the Nightingale family: Per pale ermine and gules a rose counterchanged. Crest- An ibex sejant argent tufted, armed, and maned or.
- Creation date: 1st of September, 1628
- Created by: King Charles I of England
- Baronetage: Baronetage of England
- First holder: Sir Thomas Nightingale, 1st Baronet
- Last holder: Sir Charles Athelstan Nightingale, 16th Baronet
- Present holder: Sir Charles Manners Gamaliel Nightingale, 17th Baronet
- Heir presumptive: Thomas Lacy Manners Nightingale
- Remainder to: The male heirs, of the first baronet, lawfully begotten
- Status: Active
- Former seats: Kneesworth Hall, South Cambridgeshire
- Motto: Pro Rege et Patria ("For King and Country”)

The Nightingale Baronetcy of Newport Pond is a title in the Baronetage of England and a rank in the British aristocracy. It was created by King Charles I of England, on 1 September (1628), and is one of the oldest baronetcies to remain active in England.

== History ==
To date, it has had seventeen baronets since its inception, beginning with Sir Thomas Nightingale (d. 1645) who was appointed the High Sheriff of Essex in 1627. The fourth baronet, Sir Robert Nightingale (d. 1722), was a director, and eventually chairman, of the Honourable East India Company in London, England. After his death, the title and its assets should have passed down to Edward Nightingale (b. 1659 d. 1723). However, the estate was inherited by his younger cousin, Joseph Gascoigne, who adopted the name and coat of arms of the family, but not the title. A Member of Parliament for Stafford, who sat in the House of Commons from 1727 to 1734, Joseph was educated at Trinity College and married to Lady Elizabeth Shirley, who was the eldest daughter of Washington Shirley, 2nd Earl Ferrers, of Chartley (m.1725). She died following the premature birth of her eldest daughter. Together, she and Joseph had three sons named Washington, Joseph, and Robert. Shortly after her death, Elizabeth's first two sons also died, leaving just Washington and his father alive.

After ending his time as a Member of Parliament, Joseph later moved to Mamhead House in Devon for respite and recovery, but died in July 1752. He and his wife, Lady Elizabeth, were later buried in the North Ambulatory of Westminster Abbey. Grieving for the loss of his family, Washington created a monument located in aforementioned, sculpted by Louis-Francois Roubiliac. The sculpture is seen depicting a skeleton, representing death, emerging from his prison to aim a deadly dart at Elizabeth, who is being protected by her husband. Dying two years after his father in 1754, Washington never saw the monument completed, which was finished in 1761. He died with no heir apparent and the rights to the baronetcy were later established by Sir Edward Nightingale (1760–1804), who became the 10th Baronet in 1797.

Monument commemorating Lady Elizabeth Nightingale and Joseph Nightingale in St Michael's Chapel, Westminster Abbey, London.

The history of the baronetcy is intertwined with extensive military service. For example, Sir Charles Ethelston Nightingale (11th Baronet) was a lieutenant in the Third Foot Guards. His grandson, Sir Henry Dickonson Nightingale (13th Baronet) was a lieutenant-colonel in the Royal Marines who served during the Second Anglo-Burmese War, from 1851 to 1852. His son, Sir Edward Manners Nightingale (14th Baronet), was also a captain in the Royal Army Ordnance Corps during World War I, for which he received two medals for valor and honor. Sir Geoffrey Slingsby Nightingale (15th Baronet) was a lieutenant-colonel in the Royal Army Medical Corps. He also served during World War II, and was a member of the Royal Colleges' of Physicians and Surgeons.

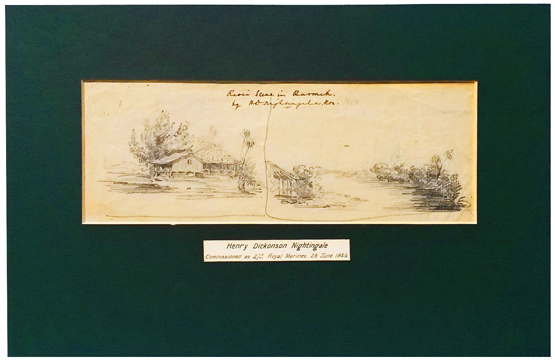
Pencil-drawing, titled "River Scene in Burmah", by Sir Lt-Col. Henry Dickonson Nightingale, 13th Baronet. Buried: Putney Cemetery, London, England. Created during the Second Anglo-Burmese War in 1851–1852.

Another notable member of the family who also had a significant military career was Major-General Manners Ralph Willmot Nightingale (1871–1956), who received the Distinguished Service Order, Order of St. Michael and St. George, Order of the Indian Empire, and Order of the Bath for his services rendered during the First and Second World Wars. He was also appointed as colonel of the 5th Royal Gurkha Rifles between 1937 and 1945, where his son, George Manners (1913–1992), served as a lieutenant-colonel.

The Nightingale name stems from both Viking and Norman ancestry, as documented in the Doomsday Book created by William I of England. The family originally came from Norfolk and Suffolk, after immigrating from Normandy. Here, they held a prominent seat at Brome Hall in Brome, which was given to them by William the Conqueror (the Duke of Normandy) for their services and contributions during the Battle of Hastings, in 1066. The family later moved to their main ancestral seat at Kneesworth Hall of Bassingbourn cum Kneesworth, Cambridgeshire, where they eventually stayed for over 200 years. This move was precipitated by Geoffrey Nightingale (b.1550 d.1619), father of Sir Thomas Nightingale, 1st Bt (b.1577 d.1645), who purchased the estate in 1597. Geoffrey was a lawyer who provided estate management for various landed gentry. In 1600, he acquired 200 acres of land in Bassingbourn and Kneesworth, and another 350 acres later on. By 1695, his grandson, Edward Nightingale (b.1658 d.1723), owned approximately 725 acres and acquired an additional 100 acres from Sir Henry Pickering, Lord of Whaddon. By 1797, Sir Edward Nightingale, 10th Bt (b.1760 d.1804), had inherited a real estate portfolio of 880 acres of land in Kneesworth, 130 acres leased from the University of Cambridge, and 200 acres in Bassingbourn. The estate was later sold by Sir Lt. Charles Ethelston Nightingale, 11th Bt (b.1784 d.1843), in 1814 and 1831, which totaled 897 acres. The family also held strong links with the local parish church of St. Peters and St. Paul's, where many members of the baronetcy and their respective families are still buried. In 1717, Edward Nightingale, de jure 5th Bt (b.1658 d. 1723) founded and created the library belonging to the church. Many of these books now reside at the University of Cambridge for historical preservation.

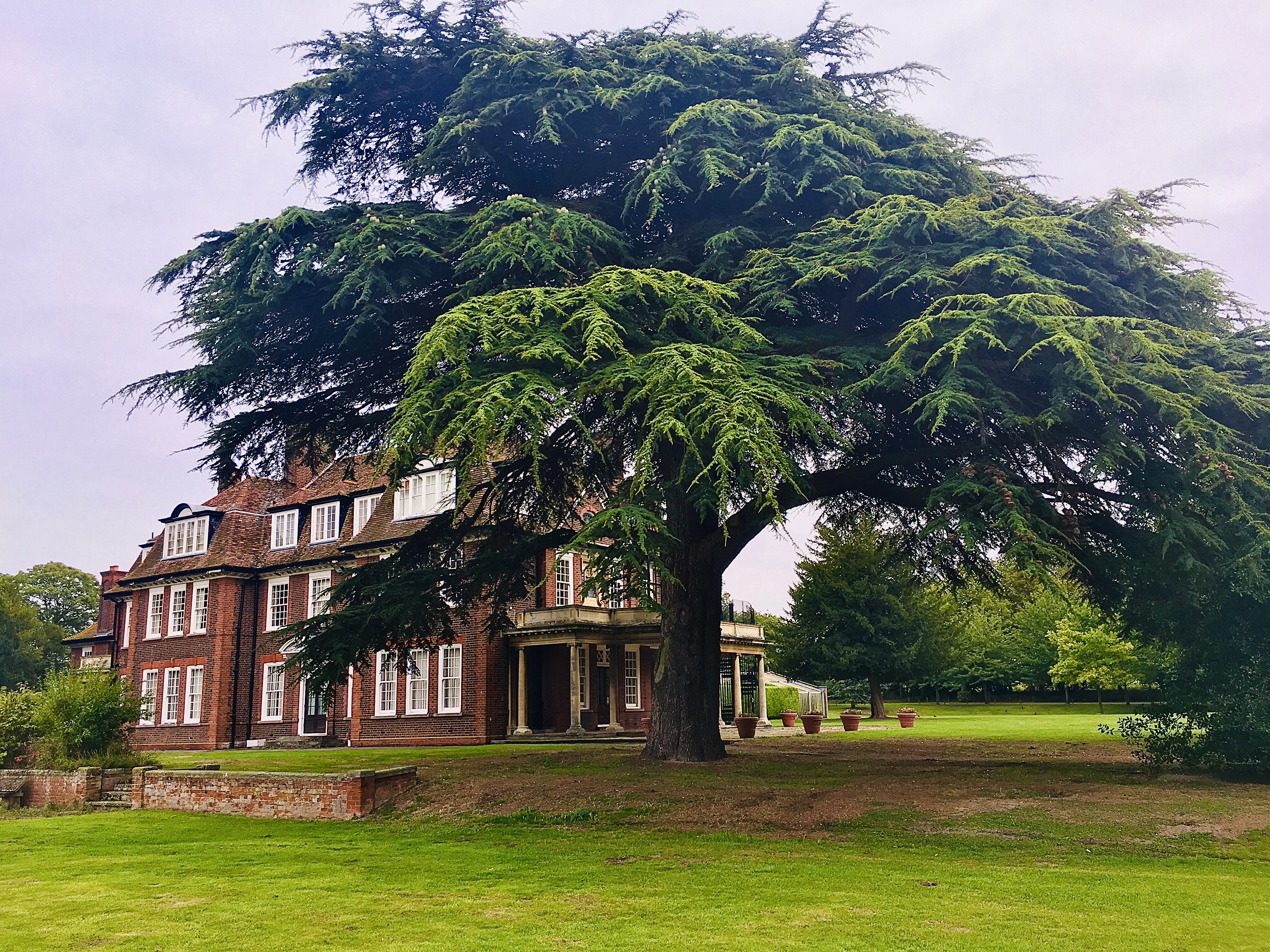
Kneesworth Hall, Bassingbourn cum Kneesworth, South Cambridgeshire.

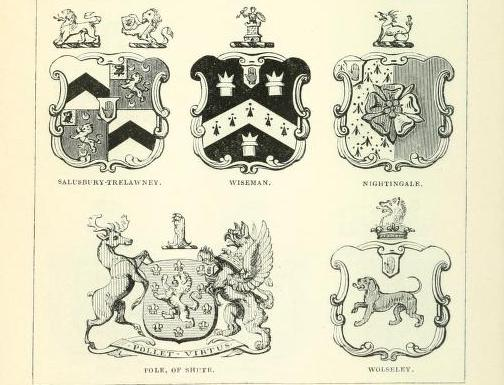
The Coat of Arms & Crest of the head of the Nightingale family, as cited in the Peerage and Baronetage published by Debrett's (1835). Located top-right.

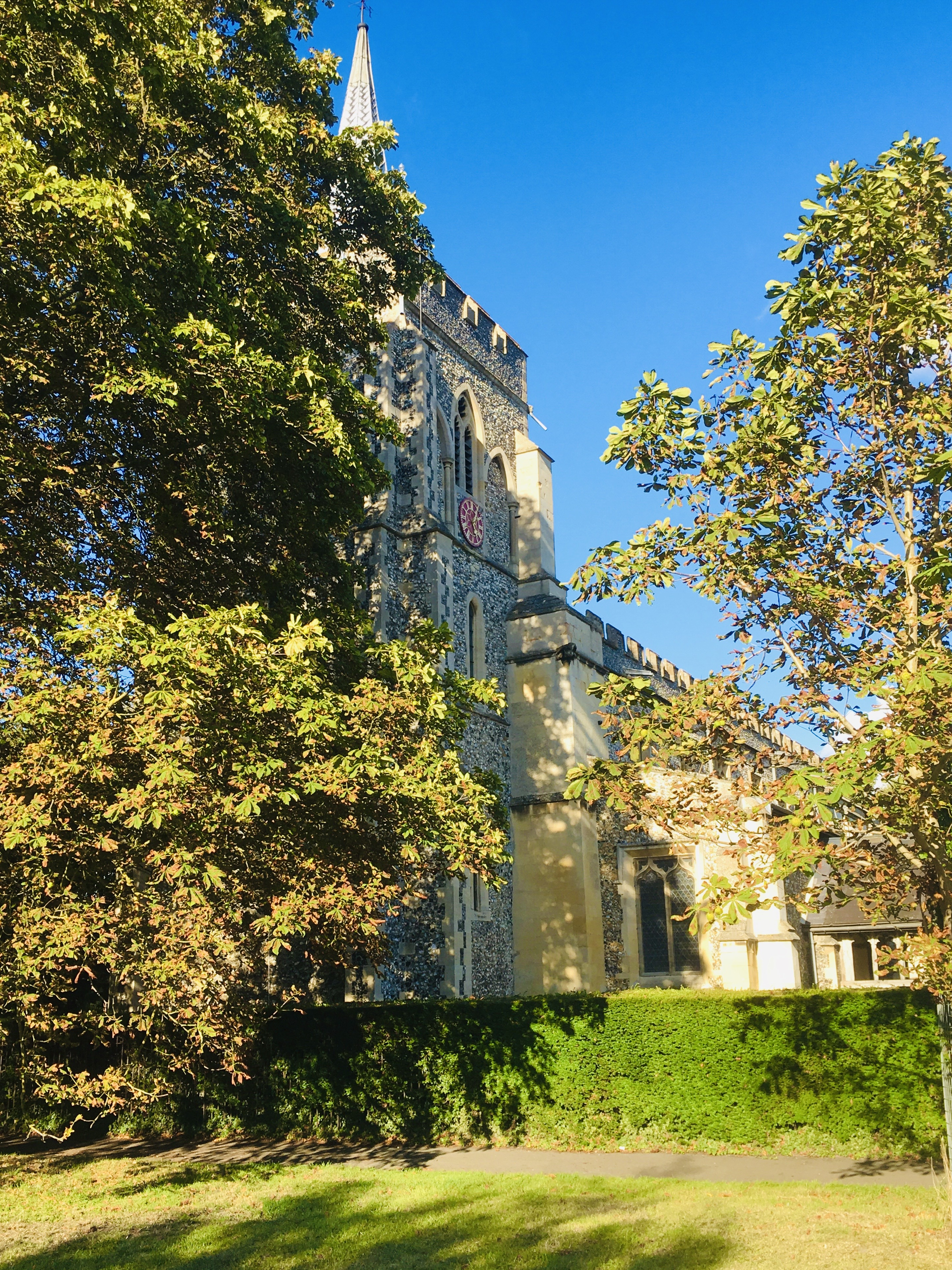
St.Peters & St.Pauls Church, Bassingbourn cum Knessworth, South Cambridgeshire.

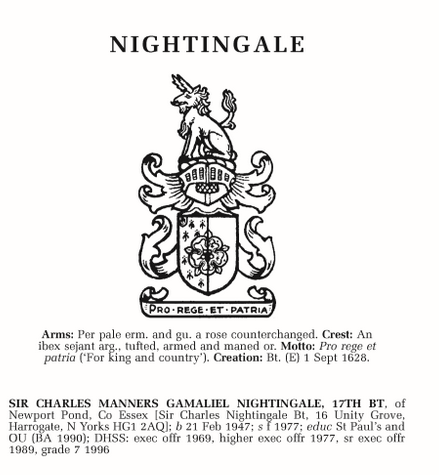
The Coat of Arms and Crest of the head of the Nightingale family, as cited in Burkes Peerage (2003).

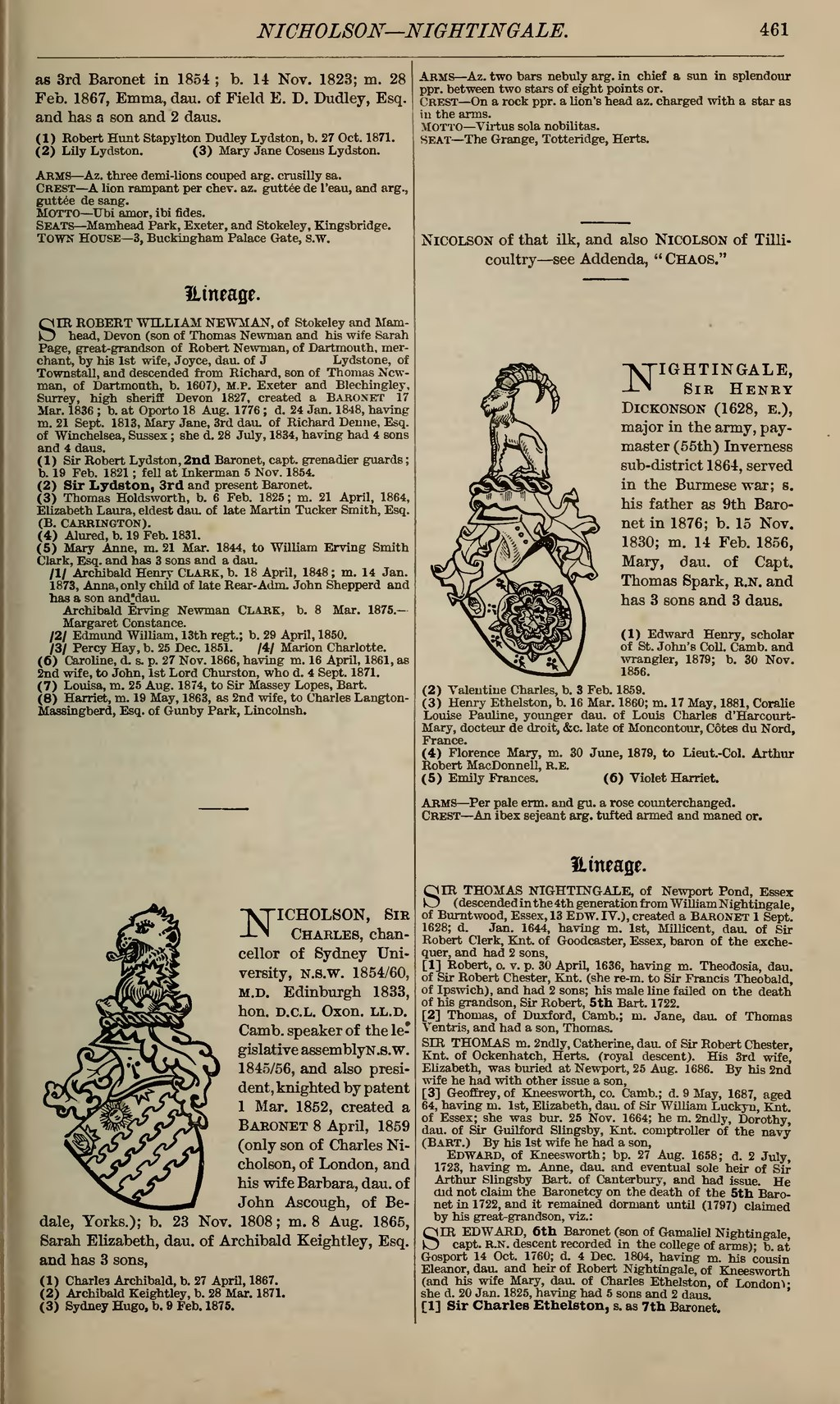
The Coat of Arms and Crest of the head of the Nightingale family.

Throughout this time, the family intermarried with relatives of peers such as Earl Ferrers, the Earl of Essex, and the Duke of Rutland, as well as the Shiers baronets, Throckmorton baronets, Slingsby baronets and Chester baronets.

Over the centuries, the spelling of the Nightingale surname has changed and developed. It has appeared as Nightingirl, Nightingall, Nightengale, Nichtegale, and Nightyngale, with several variations often referring to the same individual. This was primarily due to the different effects of regional dialects on the pronunciation and spelling of names, at that time.

The current baronet is Sir Charles Manners Gamaliel Nightingale (b. 1947), a retired civil servant from Harrogate and the seventeenth Baronet. The heir presumptive is Thomas Lacy Manners Nightingale (b. 1947), cousin to the above. The title is currently listed in Burke's Peerage, a genealogical report on the ancestry and heraldry of the aristocracy class in Great Britain. It is also cited in the Peerage and Baronetage, re-published by Debrett's every five years. All matters concerning lineage, granting and regulation of the baronetage are managed and controlled by the Ministry of Justice, via the College of Arms in London, England.

== List of baronets ==
- Sir Thomas Nightingale, 1st Baronet (b.1577 d.1645)
- Sir Thomas Nightingale, 2nd Baronet (b.1629 d.1702)
- Sir Bridges Nightingale, 3rd Baronet (d.1715)
- Sir Robert Nightingale, 4th Baronet (d.1722; Baronetcy was classed as dormant hereafter)
- Edward Nightingale, de jure 5th Baronet (b.1658 d.1723)
- Gamaliel Nightingale, de jure 6th Baronet (d.1730)
- Edward Nightingale, de jure 7th Baronet (b.1696 d.1750)
- Edward Nightingale, de jure 8th Baronet (b.1726 d.1782)
- Capt Gamaliel Nightingale, de jure 9th Baronet (b.1731 d.1791)
- Sir Edward Nightingale, 10th Baronet (b.1760 d.1804; Established claim to the Baronetcy in 1797)
- Lt Sir Charles Ethelston Nightingale, 11th Baronet (b.1784 d.1843)
- Sir Charles Nightingale, 12th Baronet (b.1809 d.1876)
- Lt-Col Sir Henry Dickonson Nightingale, 13th Baronet (b.1830 d.1911)
- Capt Sir Edward Manners Nightingale, 14th Baronet (b.1888 d.1953)
- Lt-Col Sir Geoffrey Slingsby Nightingale, 15th Baronet (b.1904 d.1972)
- Sir Charles Athelstan Nightingale, 16th Baronet (b.1902 d.1977)
- Sir Charles Manners Gamaliel Nightingale, 17th Baronet (b.1947)

== Portrait gallery ==
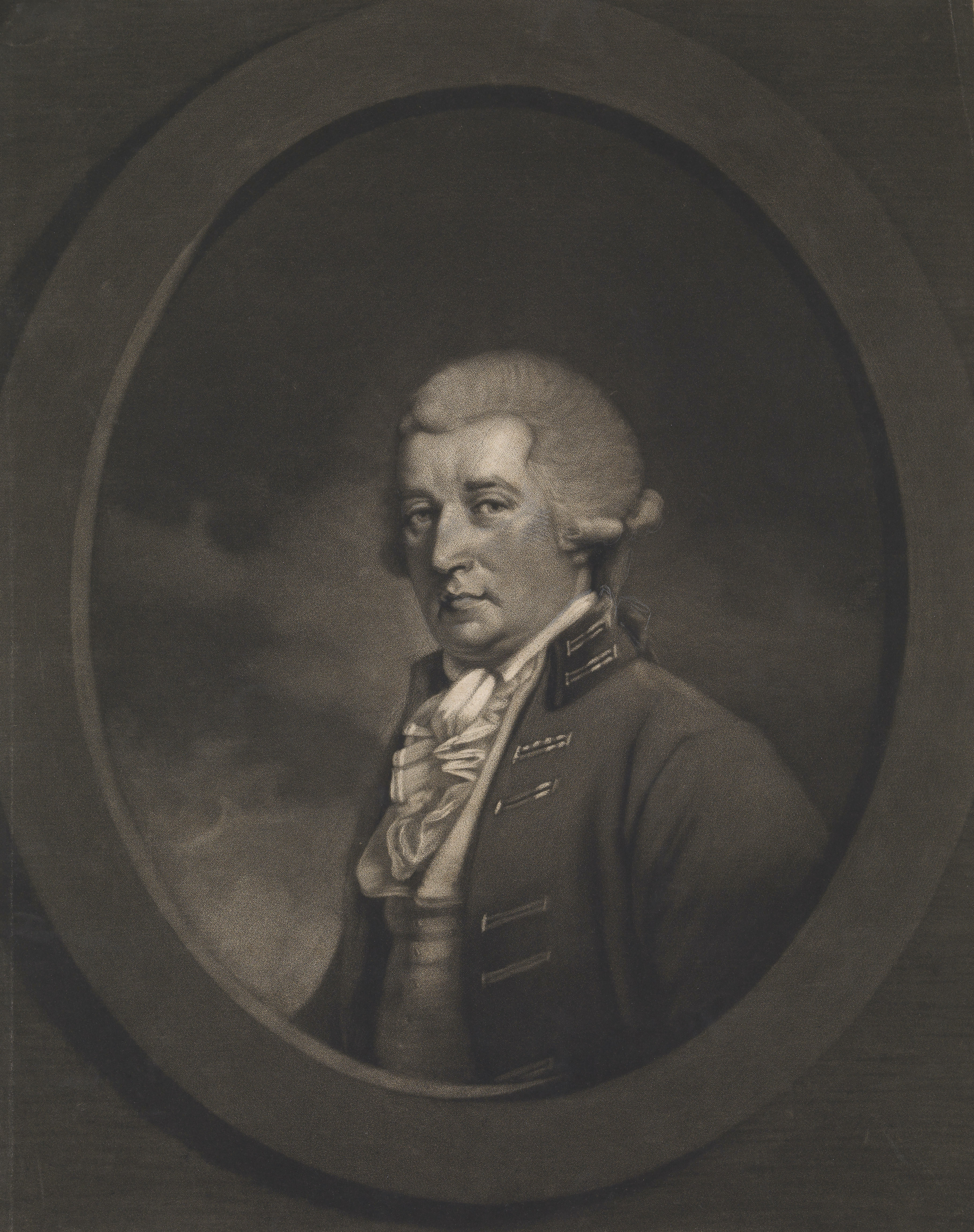
Captain Gamaliel Nightingale, de jure 9th Baronet

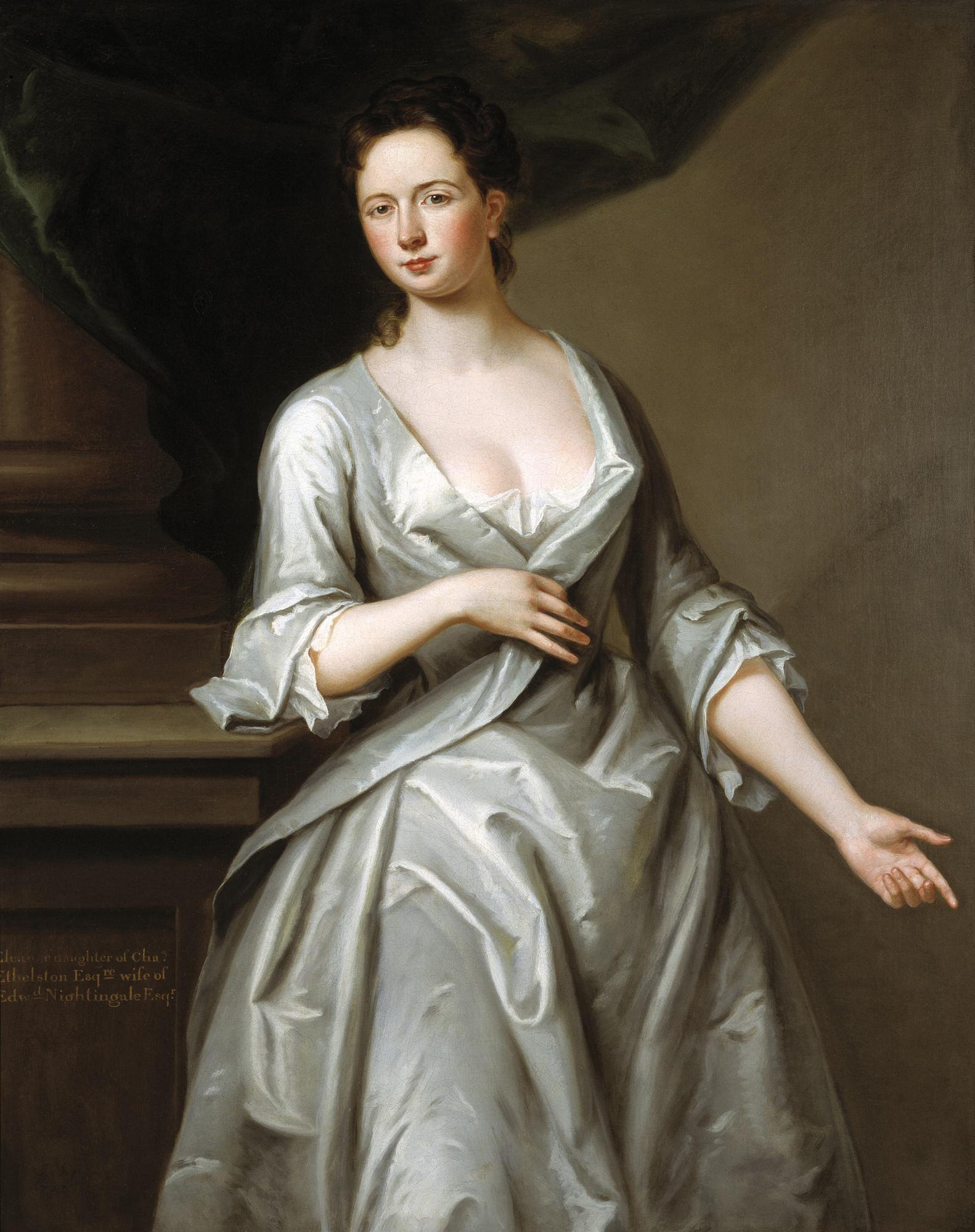
Eleanor Nightingale, wife of Edward Nightingale, de jure 7th Baronet

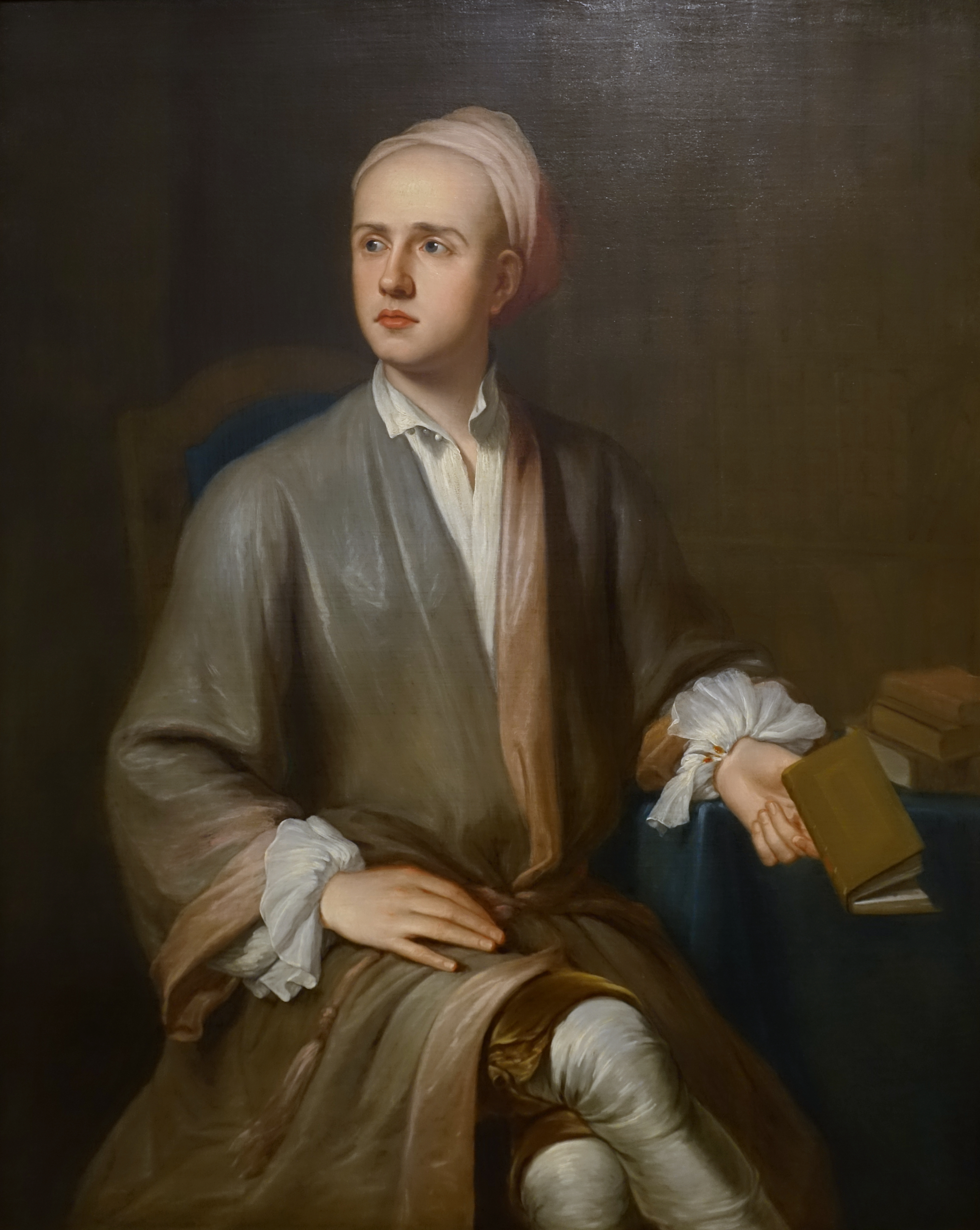
Edward Nightingale, de jure 7th Baronet

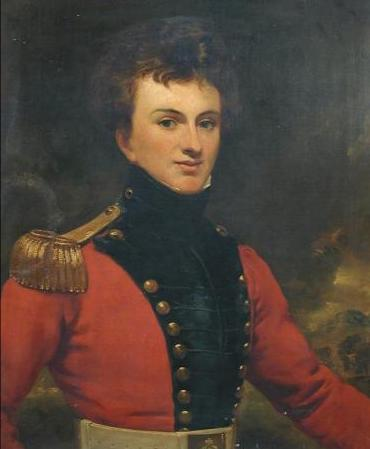
Edward Nightingale, de jure 8th Baronet

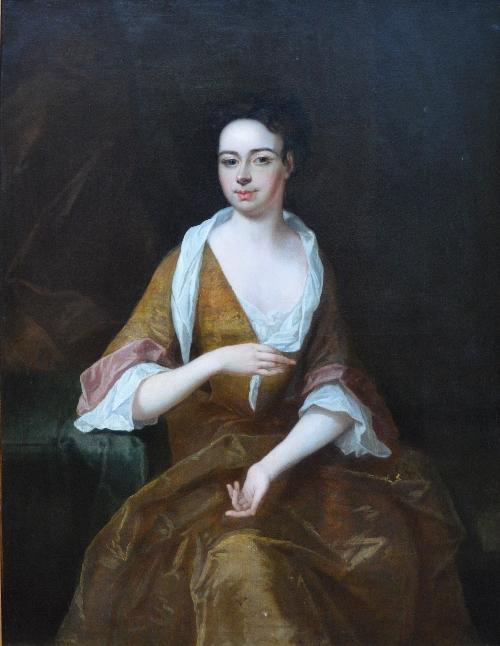
Lady. Jane Nightingale, wife of Sir Thomas Nightingale, 2nd Baronet

== Bibliography ==
- Kidd, Charles; Williamson, David, eds. (2010). Debrett's Peerage and Baronetage. London: St Martin's Press.
- Williamson, Charles (2010). Debrett's Peerage and Baronetage. London: St Martin's Press.
- Mosley, Charles (2010). Burke's Peerage (107th ed.). London.
- Baggs, A. P.; Keeling, S. M.; Meetings, A. P., eds. (1982). A History of the County of Cambridge and the Isle of Ely: Volume 8. London: Victoria County House.
- Winfield, Rif (2007). British Warships of the Age of Sail 1714–1792: Design, Construction, Careers and Fates. Seaford. ISBN 978-1861762955.
