= Francis James Holland =

- Born: 20 January 1828; London
- Died: 27 January 1907; Sorrento
- Education: Eton College, Trinity College
- Occupation: Anglican priest
- Spouse: Mary Sybilla Holland
- Children: 6
- Father: Sir Henry Holland
- Relatives: Henry Holland, 1st Viscount Knutsford

Francis James Holland (20 January 1828 – 27 January 1907) was a canon in the Church of England.

== Biography ==
He was born in St. George, Middlesex, a son of Sir Henry Holland and Margaret Emma Caldwell. He went to Eton and Trinity College, Cambridge in 1846, graduating BA in 1850 and MA in 1853. Ordained in 1851, he was appointed vicar of St Dunstan's, Canterbury (1853–1861) and then minister at the Quebec Chapel, Marylebone (Middlesex) (1861–1883). He was also a Six Preacher (1859–1882) at Canterbury Cathedral and subsequently Canon Residentiary (1882–1907). He was sometime chaplain to Queen Victoria and honorary chaplain to King Edward VII.

In around 1880 he established a trust fund for two independent girls schools in London (see Francis Holland School for more information).

His career is also covered by The Passing of Barchester by Clive Dewey published in London in 1991.

He married Mary Sybilla Lyall in 1855. She was a sister of Alfred Comyn Lyall and later converted to Catholicism. They had four sons (one of whom died young), and two daughters.
