= Viscount Knutsford =

Title in the Peerage of the United Kingdom

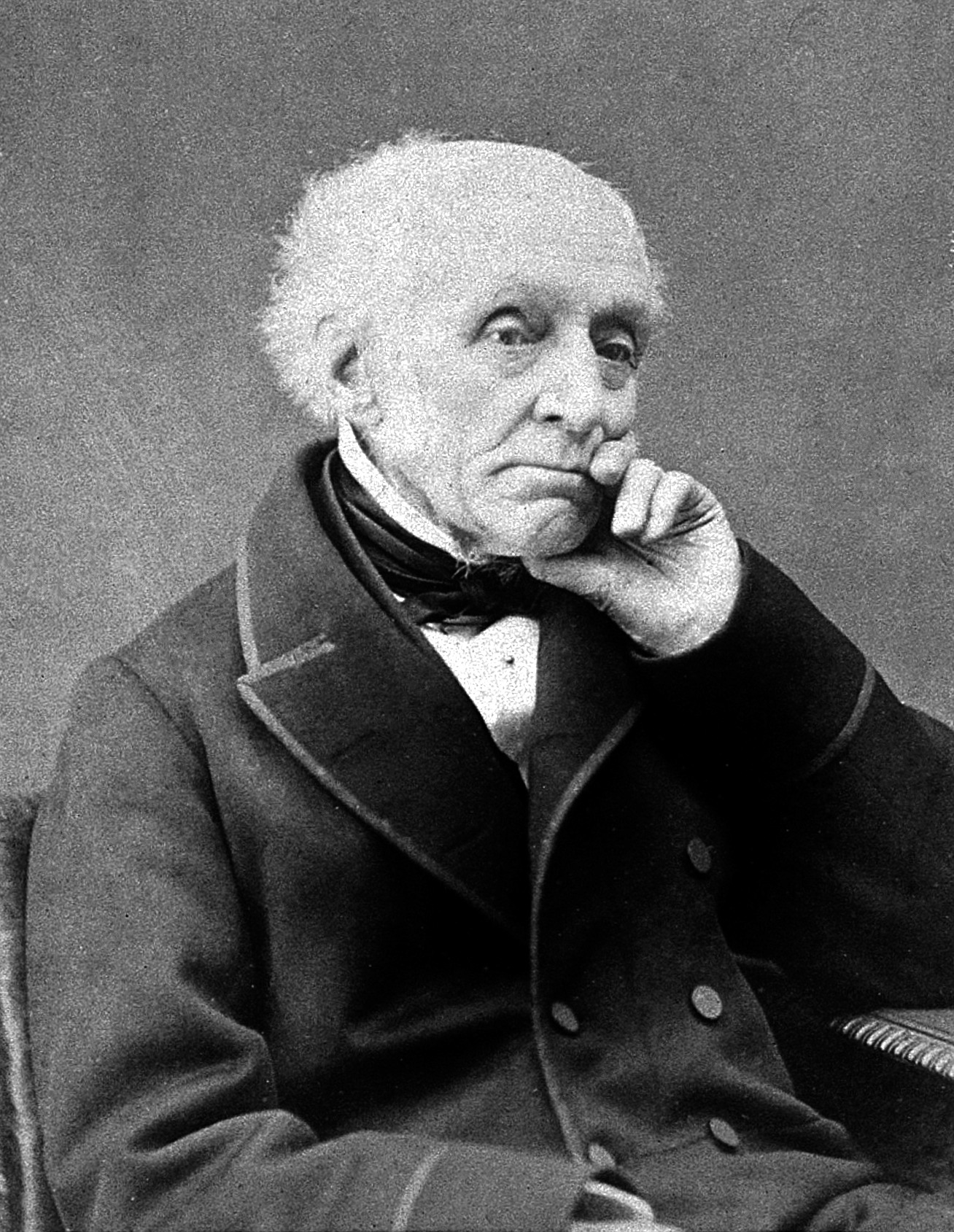
Sir Henry Holland, 1st Baronet

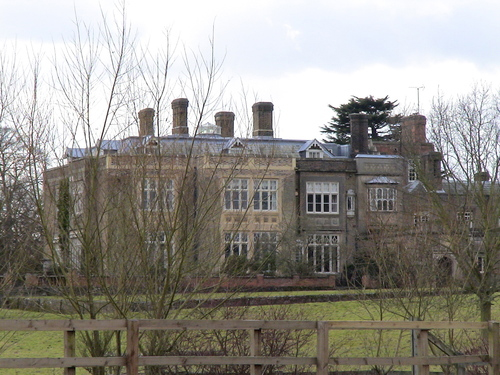
Munden House

Viscount Knutsford, of Knutsford in the County Palatine of Chester, is a title in the Peerage of the United Kingdom.

== History ==
Viscount Knutsford
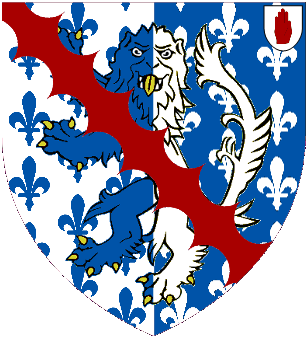
- Crest: Out of a crown vallary Or a demi-lion guardant per bend Argent and Azure charged with a bendlet engrailed counterchanged holding in the dexter paw a fleur-de-lis Argent.
- Supporters: On either side a lion guardant Argent gutté de larmes the body charged with two fleurs-de-lis in fess between two bars engrailed Azure.
- Motto: Respice Aspice Prospice

It was created in 1895 for the lawyer, Conservative politician and former Secretary of State for the Colonies, Henry Holland, 1st Baron Knutsford. He had already been created Baron Knutsford, of Knutsford in the County Palatine of Chester, in 1888, also in the Peerage of the United Kingdom. His younger twin son, the third Viscount, assumed in 1876 by Royal licence the additional surname and arms of Hibbert. As of 2025 the titles are held by the latter's great-grandson, the seventh Viscount, who succeeded his father in that year.

The Baronetcy, of Sandlebridge in the County Palatine of Chester, was created in the Baronetage of the United Kingdom on 10 May 1853 for the first Viscount's father, the prominent physician and travel writer Henry Holland.

The family seat is Munden House, near Watford, Hertfordshire.

== Holland baronets, of Sandlebridge (1853) ==
- Sir Henry Holland, 1st Baronet (1788–1873)
- Sir Henry Thurstan Holland, 2nd Baronet (1825–1914) (created Baron Knutsford in 1888)

== Barons Knutsford (1888) ==
- Henry Thurstan Holland, 1st Baron Knutsford (1825–1914) (created Viscount Knutsford in 1895)

== Viscounts Knutsford (1895) ==
- Henry Thurstan Holland, 1st Viscount Knutsford (1825–1914)
- Sydney George Holland, 2nd Viscount Knutsford (1855–1931)
- Arthur Henry Holland-Hibbert, 3rd Viscount Knutsford (1855–1935)
- Thurstan Holland-Hibbert, 4th Viscount Knutsford (1888–1976)
- Julian Thurstan Holland-Hibbert, 5th Viscount Knutsford (1920–1986)
- Michael Holland-Hibbert, 6th Viscount Knutsford (1926–2025)
- Henry Thurstan Holland-Hibbert, 7th Viscount Knutsford (born 1959)

The heir apparent is the present holder's son the Hon. Thomas Arthur Holland-Hibbert (born 1992)
