= HMS Vengeance (1758) =

18th century Royal Navy frigate

History

France
- Name: Vengeance
- Builder: Saint-Malo
- Launched: 1757
- Captured: By the Royal Navy on 8 January 1758

Great Britain
- Name: HMS Vengeance
- Acquired: 8 January 1758
- Fate: Scuttled as a breakwater in October 1766

General characteristics
- Class & type: 28-gun sixth rate
- Tons burthen: 533 8/94 bm
- Length: 116 ft 11 in (35.6 m) (overall); 95 ft 8 in (29.2 m) (keel)
- Beam: 32 ft 4 in (9.9 m)
- Depth of hold: 11 ft 3.5 in (3.44 m)
- Sail plan: Full-rigged ship
- Complement: 200
- Armament: Upper deck: 24 × 9-pdrs; Quarterdeck: 4 × 4-pdrs

HMS Vengeance was a 28-gun sixth rate of the Royal Navy. She had previously been a French privateer under the same name until her capture in 1758 during the Seven Years' War.

== French career and capture ==
Vengeance was built in 1757 at Saint-Malo. HMS Hussar, under the command of Captain John Elliot, captured her off The Lizard on 8 January 1758 and brought her into Plymouth. An Admiralty order was issued, authorising her purchase into the navy on 11 March 1758, and she was duly acquired on 21 June that year for the sum of £2,151.3.0d. She was officially named the following day, and was fitted at Plymouth between August and September 1758 for the sum of £1,619.18.6d.

== British career ==
Vengeance was first commissioned into the Royal Navy on 27 October 1758 under the command of Captain Gamaliel Nightingale, for service in the Irish Sea and, later, to assist with the impressment of sailors on the River Mersey in northwest England. In July 1759 she was anchored at the mouth of the Mersey when she encountered a whaler, Golden Lyon, returning from Greenland. On Nightingale's orders a press gang from Vengeance boarded the whaler to search for seamen eligible for impressment. The whaler's crew were exempt by virtue of their current merchant service, but not so her passengers, who were crew from another whaler that had sunk. To avoid impressment these passengers attacked the gang, capturing Vengeance's first lieutenant and throwing the rest of the gang overboard.

Golden Lyon then headed for the Mersey docks. Vengeance gave chase but the whaler reached the dock first and her crew and passengers fled ashore. Having recovered the press gang members from the river, Captain Nightingale waited for nightfall and then led the crew of Vengeance ashore to the customs house, where the whalers had taken refuge. The customs house was stormed by armed assault and the whaler crew seized and carried back to Vengeance. An angry crowd that gathered on the docks was dispersed by pistol fire and Vengeance then returned to the Mersey. Nightingale subsequently had the whaler crew flogged; those that were eligible for impressment were also kept on board and added to the Royal Navy ranks.

Vengeance joined Commodore Robert Duff's squadron in October 1759, and was part of Admiral Sir Edward Hawke's fleet at the Battle of Quiberon Bay on 20 November 1759. The following year she scored a success against privateers, capturing the letter-of-marque Comte de Nancy on 6 April 1760.

Vengeance departed for Quebec on 22 June 1760, but was back in Britain by September. Her success against privateers continued into 1761; she captured the Minerve on 27 January. On 33 March Vengeance captured the letter-of-marque Entreprenant, pierced for 44 guns, but armed en flûte with twenty-six 6 and 12-pounder guns. Entreprenant had a crew of 203 men and was carrying a cargo from Bordeaux to San Domingo. The engagement involved three exchanges of fire lasting in total some three hours. Vengeance had six men killed and 27 wounded, most dangerously; two died later. The French suffered 15 men killed and 24 wounded before they struck. On 23 March Vengeance captured the privateer Tigre. This was a small vessel out of Saint Malo, armed with four carriage guns and four swivel guns. She had a crew of 45 men under the command of Joseph Merven. She had left Abbrevak on the 21st and had not captured anything before falling prey to Vengeance off The Lizard.

Vengeance captured the 12-gun privateer Auguste, of La Rochelle, on 5 April, and was paid off in June 1761. She was surveyed on 8 August 1763, and again on 26 August 1766. This time an admiralty order was issued on 4 September for her to be fitted as a breakwater, and she was scuttled at Plymouth in October.
