= William Baggele =

English politician (died 1401)

William Baggele (died 1401) was an English politician. He sat as MP for Midhurst in April 1384, September 1388 and September 1397.

He married a woman called Joan and had three sons, including Michael Baggele.
