= Lady Saba Holland =

Saba, Lady Holland (née Smith; 1802–1866) was the eldest daughter of Sydney Smith and the second wife of Sir Henry Holland, a medical doctor and travel writer, with whom she had two daughters. She made a name for herself as the author of a much-read memoir of her famous father. (Note: A Memoir of the Reverend Sydney Smith, Vol. 1 (of 2) (1856))

Some of Smith's often-quoted sayings were first recorded in Lady Holland's memoir, including:

Why, you never expected justice from a company, did you? They have neither a soul to lose, nor a body to kick.

and

Thank God for tea! What would the world do without tea? How did it exist? I am glad I was not born before tea. I can drink any quantity when I have not tasted wine.; otherwise I am haunted by blue devils by day, and dragons by night.

Her daughters were Caroline Holland (1834–1909; author of Notebooks of a Spinster Lady, published posthumously in 1919 (Note: Notebooks of a Spinster Lady (1919))) and Gertrude Holland (1840–1898).
