= William Townley Mitford =

William Townley Mitford (27 June 1817 – 18 April 1889) was a Victorian Conservative Party politician in Britain.

He was born at Pitshill in West Sussex in 1817. He built Bedham school near Fittleworth, which was later used as a church and is now derelict.

He served as member of parliament for Midhurst from 1859 to 1874.

== Notes ==
Parliament of the United Kingdom
Preceded by John Hardy	Member of Parliament for Midhurst; 1859 – 1874	Succeeded by Charles Perceval
Honorary titles
Preceded by James Baril Daubuz	High Sheriff of Sussex; 1846	Succeeded by William Gratwicke Kinleside Gratwicke
