= John Vincent (MP) =

English politician

John Vincent (fl. 1413–1416) of Sutton, Sussex, was an English politician.

He was a member (MP) of the parliament of England for Midhurst in May 1413 and for Chichester in March 1416.
