= Henry Holland, 1st Viscount Knutsford =

British Conservative politician (1825-1914)

The Right Honourable The Viscount Knutsford GCMG PC
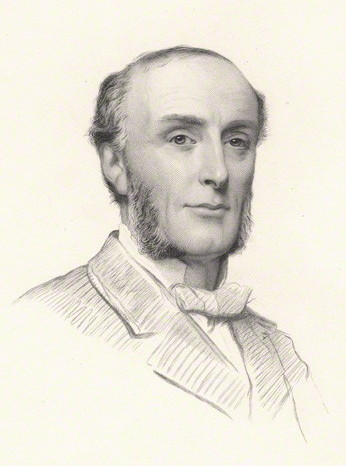

Secretary of State for the Colonies
- In office 14 January 1887 – 11 August 1892
- Monarch: Queen Victoria
- Prime Minister: The Marquess of Salisbury
- Preceded by: Hon. Edward Stanhope
- Succeeded by: The Marquess of Ripon

Personal details
- Born: Henry Thurstan Holland; 3 August 1825 Brook Street, Mayfair, Middlesex
- Died: 29 January 1914 (aged 88) Eaton Square, Belgravia, Middlesex
- Party: Conservative
- Spouse(s): Elizabeth Hibbert (m. 1852; died 1855) Margaret Jean Trevelyan (m. 1858)
- Children: Sydney Holland (son); Lionel Holland (son)
- Parent: Sir Henry Holland (father)
- Relatives: Eleanor Acland (granddaughter)
- Education: Harrow School
- Alma mater: University College, Durham; Trinity College, Cambridge

Henry Thurstan Holland, 1st Viscount Knutsford, GCMG, PC (3 August 1825 – 29 January 1914), known as Sir Henry Holland, Bt, from 1873 to 1888 and as The Lord Knutsford from 1888 to 1895, was a British Conservative politician, best known for serving as Secretary of State for the Colonies from 1887 to 1892.

== Background and education ==
The son of Sir Henry Holland, 1st Baronet, a prominent physician, Knutsford was educated at Harrow School, Durham University, and Trinity College, Cambridge, and took his degree in 1847. He studied law, and was called to the bar at the Inner Temple in 1849. He practised law privately until 1867, when he became legal advisor to the Colonial Office.

== Political career ==
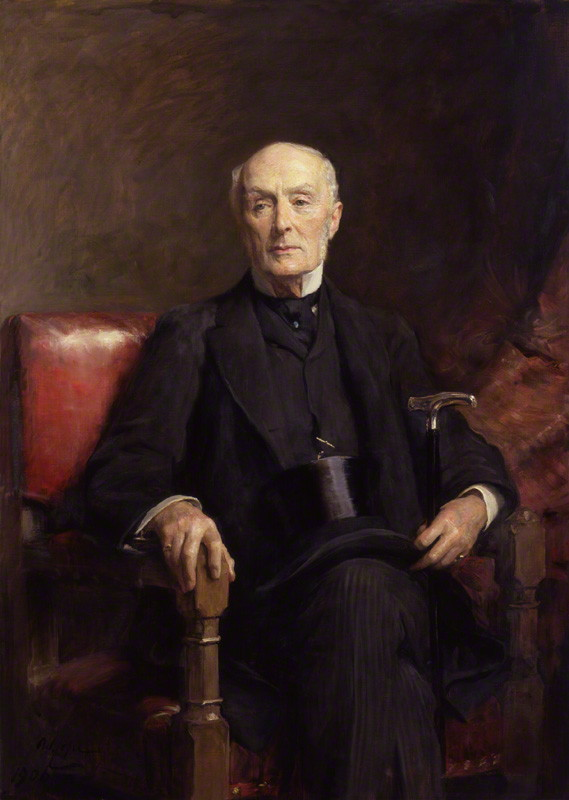
Knutsford by Arthur Stockdale Cope (1906).

In 1870 Knutsford became assistant colonial undersecretary, serving until 1874, and in 1873, having succeeded his father as 2nd Baronet, he was elected to the House of Commons as a Conservative. In Lord Salisbury's first administration (1885–1886), Knutsford served as Financial Secretary to the Treasury and then as Vice President of the Committee of Council on Education. He served in this role again at the beginning of Salisbury's second ministry (1886–1887), but was soon promoted to Colonial Secretary (in January 1887).

As Colonial Secretary, Knutsford was largely concerned with South African affairs, being the Colonial Secretary who granted the charter for Cecil Rhodes's British South Africa Company in 1887. In 1888 he was elevated to the peerage as Baron Knutsford, of Knutsford in the County Palatine of Chester. In 1895, Knutsford was not included in Salisbury's new government. He was further honoured the same year when he was made Viscount Knutsford, of Knutsford in the County Palatine of Chester.

== St John′s Ambulance ==
Lord Knutsford was a Director of the Ambulance department of the Order of the Hospital of Saint John in England, and Chairman of the St John Ambulance Association. The association mobilized detachments serving in South Africa during the Second Boer War (1899–1902), with Lord Knutsford raising support for the work. In July 1902 he received an Award for conspicuous service to the order.

== Family ==
Holland married Elizabeth Margaret, daughter of Nathaniel Hibbert, in 1852. They had twin sons and one daughter:

- Hon. Edith Emily Holland (1853–1923) married Charles James Cropper, son of James Cropper.
- Sydney Holland, 2nd Viscount Knutsford (1855–1931)
- Arthur Holland-Hibbert, 3rd Viscount Knutsford (1855–1935)

Elizabeth died in April 1855, only a few weeks after the birth of her twin sons. On 25 November 1858, Holland married Margaret Jean Trevelyan (1835–1906), daughter of Sir Charles Trevelyan, 1st Baronet by whom he had a daughter and three sons:

- Henry Macaulay Holland (16 September 1859 – 6 April 1878)
- Hon. Margaret Alice Holland (5 September 1861 – 1937), married Reginald Abel Smith
- Capt. Hon. Cecil Trevelyan Holland (26 October 1862 – 1941)
- Hon. Lionel Raleigh Holland (1865–1936)

Lady Knutsford was also involved with the St John Ambulance Association, and in July 1902 received an Award for conspicuous service for her work as Chairman of the Special Committee formed to despatch medical comforts to the Brigade units during the Second Boer War.

Lord Knutsford remained a widower until his death in January 1914, aged 88. His funeral was held at Golders Green Crematorium. He was succeeded in his titles by his elder twin son, Sydney.

== Arms ==
Coat of arms of Henry Holland, 1st Viscount Knutsford
Crest Out of a crown vallary Or a demi-lion guardant per bend Argent and Azure charged with a bendlet engrailed counterchanged holding in the dexter paw a fleur-de-lis Argent. Escutcheon Per pale Argent and Azure semée-de-lis a lion rampant guardant counterchanged over all a bendlet engrailed Gules. Supporters On either side a lion guardant Argent gutté de larmes the body charged with two fleurs-de-lis in fess between two bars engrailed Azure. Motto Respice Aspice Prospice

Parliament of the United Kingdom
Preceded by Charles Perceval	Member of Parliament for Midhurst; 1874–1885	Constituency abolished
New constituency	Member of Parliament for Hampstead; 1885–1888	Succeeded by Edward Brodie Hoare
Political offices
Preceded by John Tomlinson Hibbert	Financial Secretary to the Treasury; 1885	Succeeded by Sir Matthew White Ridley, Bt
Preceded by Hon. Edward Stanhope	Vice President of the Council; 1885–1886	Succeeded by Sir Lyon Playfair
Preceded by Sir Lyon Playfair	Vice President of the Council; 1886–1887	Succeeded by Sir William Hart Dyke, Bt
Preceded by Hon. Edward Stanhope	Secretary of State for the Colonies; 1887–1892	Succeeded by The Marquess of Ripon
Peerage of the United Kingdom
New creation	Viscount Knutsford; 1895–1914	Succeeded by Sydney Holland
New creation	Baron Knutsford; 1888–1914	Succeeded by Sydney Holland
Baronetage of the United Kingdom
Preceded by Henry Holland	Baronet (of Sandlebridge); 1873–1914	Succeeded by Sydney Holland
