= Michael Baggele =

English politician

Michael Baggele (died c. 1452) was an English politician. He sat as MP for Midhurst in 1399.

He also served as taxd collector of Sussex in December 1421, October 1422 and January 1436; and commissioner to assess tax on parishes in Sussex in April 1428.

He was the son and heir of William Baggele. He married a woman called Isabel.
