= John Bassett (by 1503 – 1550 or 1551) =

English politician

John Bassett (1503 – 1550 or 1551) of Uley in Gloucestershire, was an English politician.

== Family ==
He married twice, firstly to a widow, Faith née Love, and secondly to a woman named Joan.

== Career ==
He was a member (MP) of the parliament of England for Midhurst in 1529.
