= Rebecca Tope =

English crime novelist and journalist

- Born: Rebecca Tope; 2 October 1948 (age 77); Cheshire
- Occupations: Author, journalist

Rebecca Tope is an English crime novelist and journalist. She is the author of three murder mystery series, featuring the fictional characters of Den Cooper, a Devon police detective; Drew Slocombe, a former nurse, now an undertaker; Thea Osborne, a house sitter in the Cotswolds; and Persimmon Brown, a florist in the Lake District. Tope is also ghost writer of the novels based on the ITV series Rosemary and Thyme.

== Life and career ==
Rebecca Tope was born on 2 October 1948, in Worcestershire, and has lived in many parts of England since then. She has nearly 40 crime novels in print, published by Allison & Busby. Her two main series are set in the Cotswolds and the Lake District, both featuring amateur female detectives.

She lives on a smallholding in Herefordshire, but has had no livestock for some years. The acres have been returned to the wildlife, which includes a lot of brambles and thistles.

She founded a small press, Praxis Books, in 1992, which has concentrated almost exclusively on reissuing the works of Sabine Baring-Gould (1834–1924). She has also written and published a definitive biography of Baring-Gould.

Tope's hobbies mainly centre around wool, antique auctions and travel.

== Bibliography ==
=== The Cotswold Mysteries ===
- A Cotswold Killing 23 May 2005, Allison & Busby ISBN 978-0749083984
- A Cotswold Ordeal 31 October 2006, Allison & Busby ISBN 978-0749082680
- Death in the Cotswolds 28 April 2008, Allison & Busby ISBN 978-0749080648
- A Cotswold Mystery 28 August 2008, Allison & Busby ISBN 978-0749079420
- Blood in the Cotswolds 7 September 2009, Allison & Busby ISBN 978-0749007300
- Slaughter in the Cotswolds 22 February 2010, Allison & Busby ISBN 978-0749007935
- Fear in the Cotswolds 13 September 2010, Allison & Busby ISBN 978-0749008901
- Grave in the Cotswolds 4 April 2011, Allison & Busby ISBN 978-0749009168
- Deception in the Cotswolds (re-issued) 26 March 2012, Allison & Busby ISBN 978-0749010621
- Malice in the Cotswolds 26 March 2012, Allison & Busby ISBN 978-0749010645
- Shadows in the Cotswolds 25 March 2013, Allison & Busby ISBN 978-0749011239
- Trouble in the Cotswolds 24 March 2014, Allison & Busby ISBN 978-0749014438
- Revenge in the Cotswolds 19 March 2015, Allison & Busby ISBN 978-0749017903
- Guilt in the Cotswolds 24 March 2016, Allison & Busby ISBN 978-0749019044
- A Cotswold Casebook (short stories) 20 April 2017, Allison & Busby ISBN 978-0749020149
- Peril in the Cotswolds 24 August 2017, Allison & Busby ISBN 978-0749021689
- Crisis in the Cotswolds 19 April 2019, Allison & Busby ISBN 978-0749023386
- Secrets in the Cotswolds 24 August 2019, Allison & Busby ISBN 978-0749024338
- A Cotswold Christmas Mystery (forthcoming)

=== West Country Mysteries ===
- A Dirty Death Reprint edition 28 May 2012, Allison & Busby ISBN 978-0749040086
- Dark Undertakings 28 May 2012, Allison & Busby ISBN 978-0749040185
- Death of a Friend Reprint edition 28 May 2012, Allison & Busby ISBN 978-0749040284
- Grave Concerns 7 February 2011, Allison & Busby ISBN 978-0749009700
- A Death to Record 28 May 2012, Allison & Busby ISBN 978-0749040383
- The Sting of Death Reprint edition 7 February 2011, Allison & Busby ISBN 978-0749008895
- A Market for Murder Reprint edition 7 February 2011, Allison & Busby ISBN 978-0749008949

=== Lake District Mysteries ===
- The Windermere Witness 26 November 2012, Allison & Busby ISBN 978-0749012595
- The Ambleside Alibi 26 August 2013, Allison & Busby ISBN 978-0749012748
- The Coniston Case 24 July 2014, Allison & Busby ISBN 978-0749016159
- The Troutbeck Testimony 21 May 2015, Allison & Busby ISBN 978-0749018139
- The Hawkshead Hostage 19 May 2016, Allison & Busby ISBN 978-0749019891
- The Bowness Bequest 18 May 2017, Allison & Busby ISBN 978-0749021078
- The Staveley Suspect 19 April 2018, Allison & Busby ISBN 978-0749022396
- The Grasmere Grudge 21 March 2019, Allison & Busby ISBN 978-0749024307
- The Patterdale Plot 20 February 2020, Allison & Busby ISBN 978-0749025809
- The Ullswater Undertaking 16 December 2021, Allison & Busby ISBN 978-0749027605
- The Threlkeld Theory 2022, Allison & Busby ISBN 978-0749028619
- The Askham Accusation 20 July 2023, Allison & Busby ISBN 978-0749029715
- The Borrowdale Body 22 February 2024, Allison & Busby ISBN 978-0749031619
- A Lake District Christmas Murder 25 September 2024, Allison & Busby ISBN 978-0749031794

=== As ghostwriter ===
Three novelisations of Rosemary and Thyme, credited to ITV series creator Brian Eastman, which were published in Britain by Allison and Busby and in Australia by Hardie Grant Books:

- And No Birds Sing (published in 2004, based on the pilot episode) Allison & Busby ISBN 978-0749083410
- The Tree of Death (published in 2005, based on the final episode of Series 1) Allison & Busby ISBN 978-0749081409
- Memory of Water (published in 2006, based on the feature-length opening episode of Series 2) Allison & Busby ISBN 978-0749081270

== Accolades ==
- 2009 Longlisted for Crimefest (International Crime Fiction Convention) "Sounds of Crime (unabridged)" for Blood in the Cotswolds (read by Caroline Lennon)
- 2010 Longlisted for Crimefest "eDunnit Award" for Fear in the Cotswolds
- 2010 Longlisted for Crimefest "Sounds of Crime longlist – unabridged" for Slaughter in the Cotswolds (read by Caroline Lennon)
- 2011 Longlisted for Crimefest "eDunnit Award" for A Grave in the Cotswolds
- 2011 Longlisted for Crimefest "Sounds of Crime longlist – unabridged" for A Grave in the Cotswolds (read by Caroline Lennon)
- 2012 Longlisted for Crimefest "Audible Sounds of Crime" for Deception in the Cotswolds (read by Caroline Lennon)
- 2012 Longlisted for Crimefest "Goldsboro Last Laugh Award" for Deception in the Cotswolds
- 2012 Longlisted for Crimefest "eDunnit Award" for Deception in the Cotswolds
