= Thomas Russell (fl. 1417–1433) =

English politician

Thomas Russell (fl. 1417–1433) of Chichester, Sussex, was an English politician.

He was a member (MP) of the parliament of England for Chichester in 1417, for Midhurst in 1419, for Reigate in 1432 and for East Grinstead in 1433.
