= Rosemary & Thyme =

British television cosy mystery series (2003–2007)

- Rosemary and Thyme
- Genre: Cosy mystery Comedy drama Crime thriller Suspense
- Created by: Brian Eastman; Clive Exton
- Starring: Felicity Kendal; Pam Ferris
- Opening theme: Variation on "Scarborough Fair"
- Ending theme: idem
- Country of origin: United Kingdom
- Original language: English
- No. of series: 3
- No. of episodes: 22

Production
- Producer: Carnival Films / Granada Media
- Running time: 20x60 minutes 1x90 minutes 1x120 minutes (including adverts)
- Production company: Carnival Films / Granada Media

Original release
- Network: ITV
- Release: 31 August 2003 – 6 August 2007

Rosemary & Thyme is a British television cosy mystery thriller comedy drama series starring Felicity Kendal and Pam Ferris as gardening detectives Rosemary Boxer and Laura Thyme. The show began on ITV in 2003. The third series ended in August 2007. The theme is murder mysteries in the setting of professional gardening jobs. It was created by Brian Eastman to entertain his wife, Christabel Albery, who is an avid gardener. The show was directed by Brian Farnham (10 episodes, 2003–2006), Simon Langton (8 episodes, 2004–2006), Tom Clegg (3 episodes, 2003) and Gwennan Sage (1 episode, 2004). Clive Exton, who helped create the show, contributed 10 of the 22 scripts.

== Plot ==
A cosy mystery series set in British and European gardens, Rosemary & Thyme features two women, brought together by a sudden death, who discover their shared love of the soil. Being gardeners means that they overhear secrets and dig up clues which lead them to handle floral problems, solve crimes, and capture criminals.

== Cast and characters ==
=== Main ===
Laura Thyme (Pam Ferris) is a former police officer who has recently broken up with her husband, who cheated on her with a younger woman. She is an avid gardener with a lot of practical knowledge about plants and garden design.

Rosemary Boxer (Felicity Kendal) has a doctorate in plant pathology and was a University of Malmesbury lecturer in applied horticulture for eighteen years, before her academic position was suddenly and sneakily removed (which pushes her to punch her ex-boss, a former beau, who fired her underhandedly). Rosemary owns a somewhat dilapidated 1980 Land Rover Series III which has occasional breakdowns.

The series' title was taken from the English poem "Scarborough Fayre".

Theme tune of the programme
Sample of the theme tune of Rosemary & Thyme, 33 seconds long taken from the full 4 minute version.

While many guests starred, only two people (other than Kendal and Ferris) have appeared in more than one episode: Ryan Philpott and Daisy Dunlop, who appeared as Laura Thyme's children Matthew and Helena.

=== Guest appearances ===
- Anthony Andrews
- Catherine Bailey
- Jill Baker
- Suzanne Bertish
- Crispin Bonham-Carter
- Tracy Brabin
- Michael Carter
- Lara Cazalet
- Jan Chappell
- Michael Cochrane
- Abigail Cruttenden
- Amelia Curtis
- Joanna David
- Richard Durden
- Beatie Edney
- Michael Elwyn
- Lucy Fleming
- Oliver Ford-Davies
- Clive Francis
- Tristan Gemmill
- Christopher Good
- Murray Head
- Ella Kenion
- Belinda Lang
- Phyllida Law
- Charles Lawson
- Michael Maloney
- Mel Martin
- Neil McDermott
- Philip McGough
- Rachel Pickup
- Robert Portal
- Claire Price
- John Sackville
- Michael Siberry
- Malcolm Sinclair
- Kim Thomson
- Pip Torrens
- Martin Turner
- Margaret Tyzack
- Christopher Villiers
- Julian Wadham
- Niky Wardley
- Anna Wilson-Jones

== Episodes ==
Series
| Series | Episodes | Originally released | | Ave. UK viewers (millions) |
| Series | Episodes | First released | Last released | Ave. UK viewers (millions) |
|---|---|---|---|---|
| 1 | 6 | 31 August 2003 | 3 October 2003 | 7.80 |
| 2 | 8 | 3 October 2004 | 18 December 2004 | 6.50 |
| 3 | 8 | 23 December 2005 | 6 August 2007 | 5.36 |

=== Series 1 (2003) ===
| No. overall | No. in series | Title | Directed by | Written by | Runtime | Original release date | UK viewers (millions) |
|---|---|---|---|---|---|---|---|
| 1 | 1 | "And No Birds Sing" | Brian Farnham | Clive Exton | 49 minutes | 31 August 2003 | 11.11 |
Rosemary Boxer, an expert botanist, is hired by an old friend to investigate why trees in the grounds of their home are becoming diseased. At the hotel where she is staying, Rosemary befriends Laura Thyme, a former police officer who is staying there, after leaving her home upon learning that her husband abandoned her for a younger woman. Seeking to forget her husband, Laura willingly agrees to help Rosemary solve her botany problem, but plants are soon the least of their concerns when a murder occurs...
| 2 | 2 | "Arabica and the Early Spider" | Tom Clegg | Clive Exton | 49 minutes | 5 September 2003 | 8.00 |
Rosemary and Laura, having become close friends and opting to work together, find themselves enlisted by an ageing rock star, Nev Connolly, to renovate the grounds of his newly-bought mansion, Compton Lacey. Shortly after they start work, disaster strikes when the singer is found dead, and the mystery is added to by the emergence of a skeleton of a horse near to the grounds. The pair quickly begin to wonder what is going on, and soon discover a past rivalry is rearing its head once more...
| 3 | 3 | "The Language of Flowers" | Tom Clegg | Clive Exton and Isabelle Grey | 49 minutes | 12 September 2003 | 7.01 |
The two gardeners find themselves travelling to a mansion-turned-health spa, owned by the Caldecott family, to help restore a grand water cascade within the spa's grounds. Stumped by the long-decayed mechanics of the feature, Rosemary and Laura soon realise that all is not well when Frances Caldecott, the matriarch of the Caldecott Family, is found strangled and the gardeners suspect the motive has family ties...
| 4 | 4 | "Sweet Angelica" | Brian Farnham | David Joss Buckley | 49 minutes | 19 September 2003 | 6.94 |
While trying to uncover the source of a disease that has crept up in the lawn of a special language college, Rosemary and Laura are shocked when they find the body of Felix, the college’s handyman, at the side of the road. When another student, Angelica, is found dead on the college grounds, having been pushed to her death and with a ceremonial knife in her possession, the two gardeners discover that the second victim was highly religious and knew something about the killer...
| 5 | 5 | "A Simple Plot" | Tom Clegg | Chris Fewtrell | 49 minutes | 26 September 2003 | 6.51 |
On their next job, Rosemary introduces Laura to a close friend - a blind professor, who seeks help on his allotment plot. Flowers are dying at random and suspicion is directed at the nearby building site as the cause. Shortly after a meeting with other plot owners in the allotments, the professor dies in what appears to be an accident, until the gardeners discover that someone cleverly used his means of getting around to kill him. As they try to work out who wanted him dead, Rosemary is surprised to learn that the professor left her a notable fortune in his will...
| 6 | 6 | "The Tree of Death" | Brian Farnham | Peter Spence and Simon Brett | 50 minutes | 3 October 2003 | 7.25 |
While restoring a churchyard for an upcoming fayre for a local vicar, whom Rosemary and Laura befriend, the pair are shocked to come across the body of a local man next to an ancient yew tree where they are working. The suspects are many for the man's murder, in which he was impaled by an arrow, leaving the gardners no choice but to save the day...

=== Series 2 (2004) ===
| No. overall | No. in series | Title | Directed by | Written by | Runtime | Original release date | UK viewers (millions) |
|---|---|---|---|---|---|---|---|
| 7 | 1 | "The Memory of Water" | Brian Farnham | Stephen Gallagher | 93 minutes | 3 October 2004 | 7.08 |
Whilst restoring a walled garden at Lyvedon Manor, aided by ex-cons from a local prison, Rosemary and Laura initially think the body of a man found in a river is that of the owner's mysterious cousin. But when the cousin is seen alive, the two gardeners are left puzzled as to whose body it was that was found... Note: A number of the players are named after characters in the Sexton Blake canon.
| 8 | 2 | "Orpheus in the Undergrowth" | Simon Langton | David Joss Buckley | 47 minutes | 8 October 2004 | 6.81 |
Laura and Rosemary are called upon by an old friend to help create a memorial garden in Notting Hill, based around the tale of Orpheus and Eurydice. As the pair begin work on the garden, Laura's daughter Helena who lives there arrives and mistakenly blames her mother for the breakup of her marriage. But Laura is forced to put aside efforts to correct her daughter, when a recovering alcoholic dies in mysterious circumstances...
| 9 | 3 | "They Understand Me in Paris" | Brian Farnham | Clive Exton | 47 minutes | 15 October 2004 | 6.27 |
At Villa Glavany, in the French Riviera, Rosemary and Laura are helping their friend Dorothy prepare the villa's 150-year-old gardens for a public opening, despite opposition from her neighbour, James Pretty, who will stop at nothing to ensure that this will not happen. The pair find themselves wondering if murder might be something he would do, when Dorothy's husband is discovered dead in the villa's living room...
| 10 | 4 | "The Invisible Worm" | Simon Langton | Guy Andrews | 47 minutes | 22 October 2004 | 6.22 |
With roses dying in their beds at Stagford Lodge Preparatory School, classics master, Richard Oakley, calls upon Rosemary and Laura to help resolve the problem. Their arrival coincides with a mysterious ritual being held before the last day of term, in which a member of staff causes mischief while dressed as the Stag. However, things turn sour when Simon Todd, the geography master, is found dead in some undergrowth the next day, killed by a harpoon fired from the headmaster's prized harpoon gun. The sleuthing gardeners soon find themselves wondering what the motive was for Simon's murder...
| 11 | 5 | "The Gongoozlers" | Simon Langton | Clive Exton | 47 minutes | 29 October 2004 | 6.18 |
Hoping to boost the ratings of Gavin Patterson's failing TV garden makeover programme, Quinnie Dorell, a famous round-the-world yacht sailor, is roped in to present the show. Due to her fear of heights, Rosemary, who is on the grounds the show is being shot on alongside her friend Laura, is asked to take Quinnie's place to present an overview of recent developments from some scaffolding, but disaster strikes when a loose bolt causes her to plummet to the ground. Suspecting it's no accident, Laura recruits Quinnie's help to investigate what happened, and it's not long before the theft of Rosemary's laptop is compounded when a visiting journalist is found electrocuted in the swimming pool and when Laura and Quinnie find a car on fire.
| 12 | 6 | "The Italian Rapscallion" | Brian Farnham | Clive Exton | 47 minutes | 5 November 2004 | 5.84 |
Travelling to the Ligurian Coast in Italy, Rosemary and Laura offer to help their old friend Emma Standish prepare her new restaurant for its grand opening. But when a tour around the famous Giardini Tremonti comes to an abrupt end with Laura finding the body of Janice Alexander, an English private detective and former colleague, who’d been hit over the head with a rock, which was lying beside her when she was found. The gardeners find many flamboyant personalities to make solving the mystery difficult. Then Sir Basil Slavinksi is found dead, after having been pushed off the cliff at the end of his garden.
| 13 | 7 | "Swords into Ploughshares" | Gwennan Sage | Chris Fewtrell | 47 minutes | 12 November 2004 | 6.11 |
Laura is stunned to find Rosemary alive and at her mother's, after a news report announced that she had been shot dead in Engleton Park. It quickly transpires that the body found by the police was that of Rosemary's undergraduate friend, Gemma Jackson, an archaeologist who had posed as her to gain access to the grounds of the Park. While offering to help Lord Engleton determine why plants on his estate are in bad health, the pair also attempt to work out what brought Gemma to Engleton Park and soon discover that she had begun to suspect someone was illegally buying artefacts from dig sites...
| 14 | 8 | "Up the Garden Path" | Simon Langton | Peter Spence | 47 minutes | 18 December 2004 | 7.52 |
When gardens in the village of Rowfield are struck by a mysterious blight, Rosemary and Laura find themselves hired by a member of the Rowfield Garden Open Day scheme to rectify the problem. While trying to sort out the problem, the gardeners are shocked when they find the body of Donald Westward under a collapsed branch, with his garden savaged. They soon discover he was seriously disliked by many in the village, and have a wealth of suspects, including an unfriendly gardener and a couple who don't quite fit in with the rest of the village...

=== Series 3 (2005-07) ===
| No. overall | No. in series | Title | Directed by | Written by | Runtime | Original release date | UK viewers (millions) |
|---|---|---|---|---|---|---|---|
| 15 | 1 | "The Cup of Silence" | Brian Farnham | Stephen Gallagher | 70 minutes | 23 December 2005 | 5.77 |
Strapped for cash on their latest job and with no Land Rover, Rosemary and Laura pull out all the stops to try rid Woodley Court Hotel's vineyard of pestering weeds. But while trying to ensure that the latest crop is saved, the pair soon find themselves also investigating the murder of Angus Fairley, a famous critic and close friend of Rosemary's, who was visiting the area.
| 16 | 2 | "In a Monastery Garden" | Brian Farnham | Peter Spence | 47 minutes | 21 January 2006 | 5.20 |
With a Royal visit planned for Wellminster Cathedral, Rosemary and Laura find themselves hired to help restore an old monastery garden at the cathedral in time for the visit, although not everyone is pleased by their presence. No sooner have they started, the body of the local custodian's step-daughter, Trish, is found by the gardeners, who soon uncover secrets within the cathedral's tight-knit community, before a skeleton is found within the garden's old well.
| 17 | 3 | "Seeds of Time" | Simon Langton | Clive Exton | 47 minutes | 28 January 2006 | 5.05 |
In order to re-organize the seed collection of famous botanist, Edwin Pargeter, Rosemary and Laura are called in by the current generation of Pargeters to help with the task. Their task is daunting, and it's not helped when a mysterious Chilean man is found dead in the back garden of the Pargeters' house. As they try to work out who the man was, they soon discover that something in Edwin's seeds is quite valuable, and that someone is out to get them, no matter the cost.
| 18 | 4 | "Agua Cadaver" | Brian Farnham | David Joss Buckley | 47 minutes | 4 February 2006 | 5.69 |
A noted scholar of Spanish Islamic History, and a former boyfriend of Rosemary, invites both her and Laura to his beautiful home in the hills of Southern Spain, so they can help to restore an old Moorish garden inspired by the Alhambra. While the pair try to find a source of water they need for the garden, they don't expect to find murder when they come across the body of a young woman named Maria in the hills, who had been pushed to her death.
| 19 | 5 | "Three Legs Good" | Simon Langton | Clive Exton | 47 minutes | 11 February 2006 | 5.01 |
Rosemary and Laura are re-planting historic Regent's Park, which is hampered when they find plants being stolen shortly after being planted. While trying to determine who is stealing them, they soon find themselves dealing with a murder when an Eastern European doctor is found shot dead, while walking a three-legged dog. It's not long before the pair unearth secrets in the park, and begin suspecting the doctor might not have been the intended victim, when his colleague, the dog's owner, is soon shot himself.
| 20 | 6 | "The Gooseberry Bush" | Simon Langton | Clive Exton | 47 minutes | 18 February 2006 | 5.48 |
While helping to create a memorial garden for a woman who intends to re-marry her former husband, Rosemary and Laura are surprised to find an abandoned baby under a gooseberry bush. While the pair wonder who the mother is as they get on with the garden, a gunshot soon leads them to the body of a noted artist, leaving them wondering if the murder and the abandoned child are possibly connected.
| 21 | 7 | "Racquet Espanol" | Brian Farnham | David Joss Buckley | 47 minutes | 30 July 2007 | 5.39 |
While Rosemary and Laura are helping to do up a garden for a Spanish tennis camp that is holding a tournament, in which Laura's son is taking part, tragedy strikes when the body of one of the Pro-Am tournament players is discovered. Although the player is thought to have died in a drunken accident, the gardeners soon find evidence that they were murdered, especially when the player's wife is killed in an accident intended for someone else. The pair soon realise that something is not right within the tennis camp.
| 22 | 8 | "Enter Two Gardeners" | Simon Langton | Clive Exton | 47 minutes | 6 August 2007 | 5.27 |
Rosemary is delighted to be working on the garden of an open-air theatre with Laura, as her cousin Charles is an actor preparing for his role in an amateur production. But during rehearsals, one of the actors is suddenly killed by a prop gun, while initially thought an accident, the police soon discover it had been loaded with live ammo instead of blanks. Then when someone else is murdered, the two gardeners soon wonder if someone is out to sabotage the play or whether there is another motive at work.

== Cancellation ==
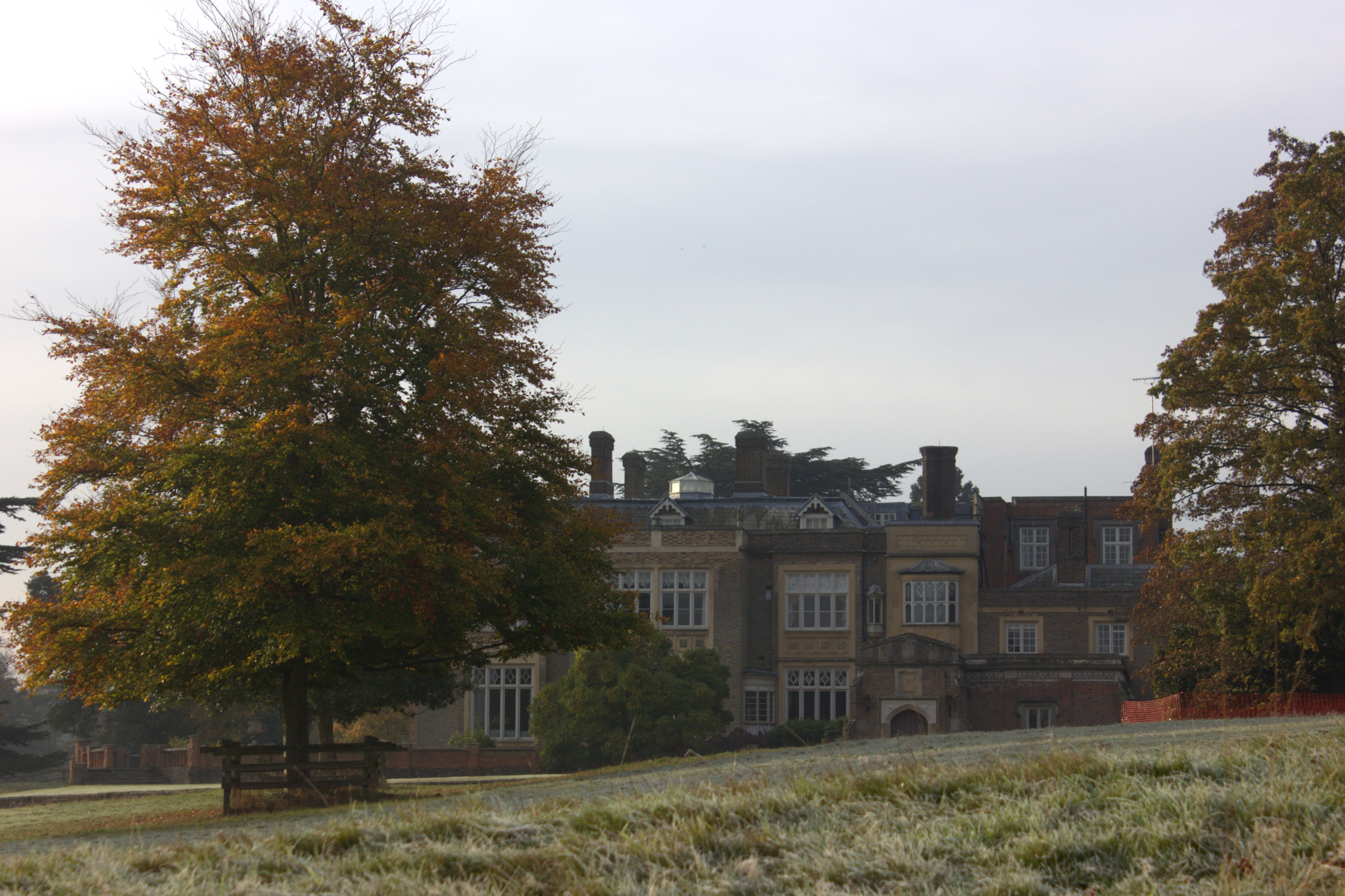
Munden House served as the filming location for the “Swords into Ploughshares” episode

On 12 May 2006, ITV announced that the show was to be axed as part of a major refresh in ITV1's programming. The final two episodes of series three ("Racquet Espanol" and "Enter Two Gardeners") were not aired with the rest of the series during 2005–06. They were eventually broadcast on 30 July and 6 August 2007 respectively.

== Novels ==
Three novelisations, credited to series creator Brian Eastman and ghostwritten by crime writer Rebecca Tope, were published in Britain by Allison and Busby and in Australia by Hardie Grant Books:

- And No Birds Sing (published in 2004, based on the pilot episode)
- The Tree of Death (published in 2005, based on the final episode of Series 1)
- Memory of Water (published in 2006, based on the feature-length opening episode of Series 2)

== Related media ==
Composed and conducted by Christopher Gunning, a CD of incidental music and the opening theme (performed by John Williams) from the first two series of Rosemary & Thyme.

DVD releases

| DVD Name | Episodes | Release Date | | |
| DVD Name | Episodes | Region 1 | Region 2 | Region 4 |
|---|---|---|---|---|
| Series One | 6 | 14 June 2005 | 6 October 2003 | 2 April 2007 |
| Series Two | 8 | 28 February 2006 | 27 December 2004 | 2 June 2007 |
| Series Three | 8 | 6 February 2007 | 3 April 2006 | 4 August 2007 |
| The Complete Series | 22 | 5 February 2008 | 7 August 2006 | 3 November 2007 |
| The Complete Series (re-issue) | 22 | 4 October 2011 | 4 July 2011 | 5 May 2008 (slimline) 6 March 2013 |
