= Kneesworth Hall =

Historic English mansion

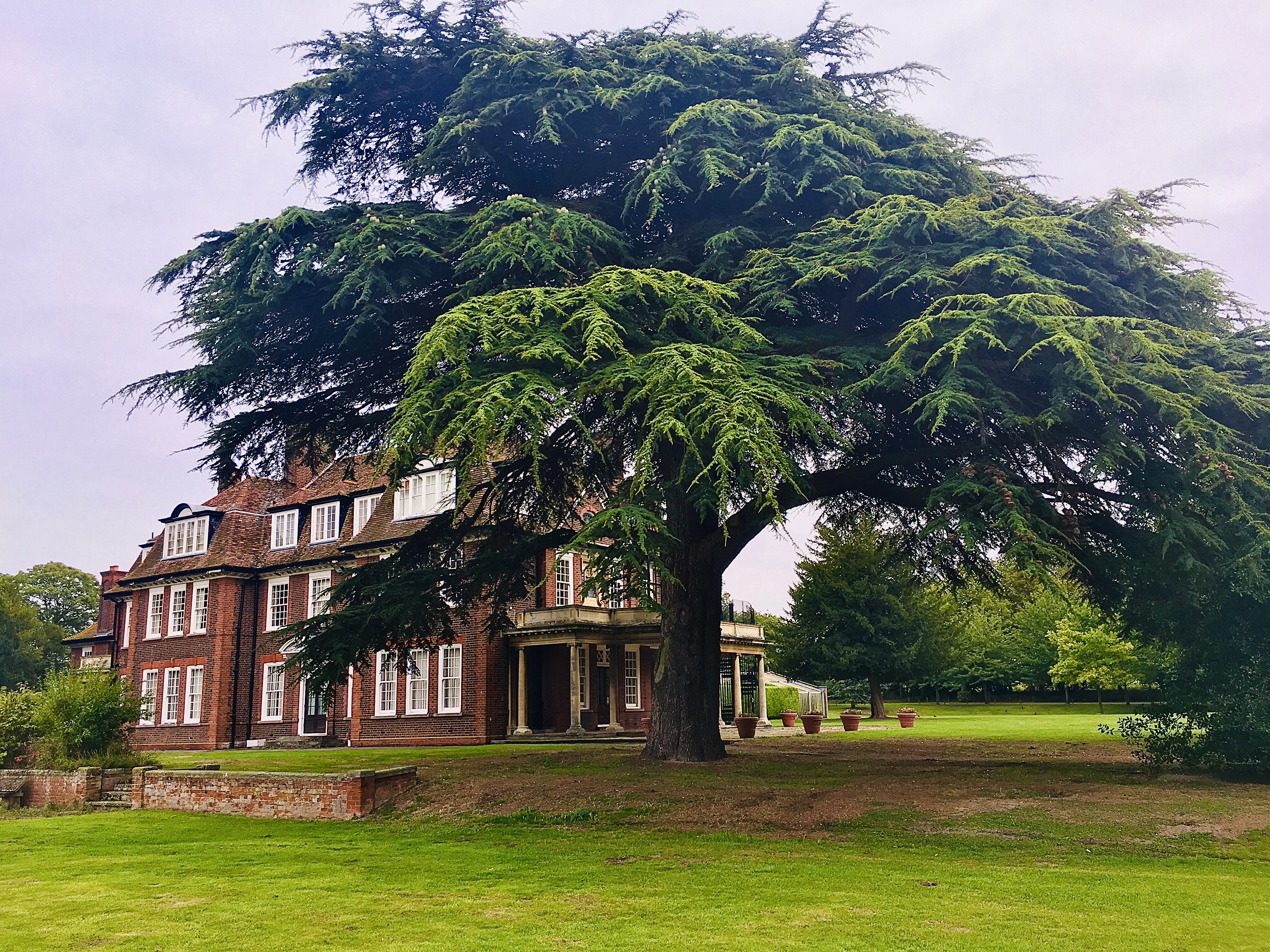
- Atlas Cedar tree in the grounds of Kneesworth Hall

- Location within Cambridgeshire
- Alternative names: Kneesworth House

General information
- Type: Grade II Listed
- Architectural style: Edwardian mansion
- Location: near Bassingbourn cum Kneesworth, South Cambridgeshire, England
- Coordinates: 52°04′44″N 0°02′03″W
- Elevation: 30 m (98 ft)
- Construction started: 16th century (Rebuilt in 1904)
- Owner: Priory Group (Subsidiary); Acadia Healthcare (Parent)

Design and construction
- Architects: William Bolnest; Thomas Bolnest; Geoffrey Nightingale; Sydney Holland, 2nd Viscount Knutsford; Robert Plumbe

Listed Building – Grade II
- Official name: Kneesworth House
- Designated: 17 October 1984
- Reference no.: 1330843

Kneesworth Hall, also known as Kneesworth House or Kneesworth House Hospital, is an Edwardian mansion in England, located in Bassingbourn cum Kneesworth, 22.3 miles (35.9 km) south-west of Cambridge in South Cambridgeshire. It was the aristocratic seat of the Nightingale Family and Sydney Holland, 2nd Viscount of Knutsford, between 1600 and 1948. The mansion is set in expansive parkland and backed by a diverse range of foliage and forestry. In October 1984, it was registered as a Grade II listed building. Today, Kneesworth is an acute hospital owned by The Priory Group, a subsidiary of Acadia Healthcare headquartered in Tennessee.

== History ==
Kneesworth Hall has had a varied and diverse usage in its history. In the middle of the 16th century, William Bolnest created a nine roomed red bricked house, which his son Thomas Bolnest also lived in. In 1597, the house was purchased by Geoffrey Nightingale (1550–1619), father of Sir. Thomas Nightingale, 1st Baronet of Newport Pond (1577–1645). Geoffrey was a lawyer who provided estate management for various landed gentry. In 1600, he acquired 200 acres of land in Bassingbourn and Kneesworth belonging to the Burman family, and another 360 acres from the Thomas Bolnest. By 1695, his grandson, Edward Nightingale (1658–1723), owned approximately 725 acres, who had also acquired an additional 100 acres from Sir. Henry Pickering, Lord of Whaddon. By 1797, Sir. Edward Nightingale, 10th Bart (1760–1804), had a real estate portfolio of 880 acres in Kneesworth, 130 acres of land leased from Christ's College, and 200 acres in Bassingbourn. His son, Sir. Lt. Charles Etherlston Nightingale, 11th Bart (1784–1843), sold a significant majority of the portfolio including the rights to Kneesworth Hall in 1814 and 1831, which totalled 897 acres. The purchaser, William Mason, retained Kneesworth Hall from 1832 to 1848. In 1849, it passed to Biscoe Hill Wortham (died 1895). Sydney Holland, 2nd Viscount Knutsford bought the estate in 1900, which included 49 acres of parkland. By 1904, he had rebuilt the hall into an Edwardian mansion by employing Robert Plumbe, a local architect. After he died in 1931, it was occupied by his widow Mary Holland, who died in 1947. In 1948, it was sold to the Cambridge Education Authority and converted into a Boys Approved School for children with high IQs in collaboration with the University of Cambridge and the Home Office. By this time, the estate had close to 200 acres of land, with 9 cottages and a mill house, including the mansion itself. In 1985, it was purchased by the AMI Healthcare Group and later converted into a psychiatric hospital.

Sadly, Kneesworth House was a centre for abuse, the infamous pedophile, Keith Laverack, aka BogStretcher, and others in the social services sexually abused boys at the House over a period of many years. Following a Court Case against the County service a fund was set up to pay off the victims at the rate of thirty thousand pounds each. Some of the boys had suffered life altering injuries that would follow them for the rest of their lives. When one of the boys would try to expose the activities of Laverack et al, the school would dispatch a social worker to try to provide a cover story to the child's parents. Sexual abuse in Approved Schools was common place, and assessment centres, such as Redhill, another Home Office institution, were used to direct vulnerable children to the pedophiles.

== Bibliography ==
- Kidd, Charles; Williamson, David, eds. (2010). Debrett's Peerage and Baronetage. London: St Martin's Press.
- Williamson, Charles (2010). Debrett's Peerage and Baronetage. London: St Martin's Press.
- Mosley, Charles (2010). Burke's Peerage (107th ed.). London.
- Baggs, A. P.; Keeling, S. M.; Meetings, A. P., eds. (1982). A History of the County of Cambridge and the Isle of Ely: Volume 8. London: Victoria County House.
