= John Ive (MP for Midhurst) =

Member of the Parliament of England

John Ive (fl. 1402–1415) of Midhurst, Sussex, was an English politician and a trader in cloth.

He was a Member (MP) of the Parliament of England for Midhurst in 1402 and 1415.
