= Edmund Ford (16th-century MP) =

English politician

Edmund Ford (by 1524 – 1568/79), of Harting, Sussex, was an English politician.

He was a member (MP) of the parliament of England for Midhurst in 1547.
