= Charles Perceval, 7th Earl of Egmont =

British peer and Conservative Party politician

Charles George Perceval, 7th Earl of Egmont (15 June 1845 – 5 September 1897) was a British peer and Conservative Party politician of the Victorian era.

On 19 September 1868, he was commissioned a cornet in the 2nd Regiment of the Royal Buckinghamshire Yeomanry.

He was elected at the general election in February 1874 as the Member of Parliament (MP) for the parliamentary borough of Midhurst in Sussex. However, he succeeded to the peerage on 2 August that year, taking both the Irish title of Earl of Egmont and the title Baron Arden in the Peerage of the United Kingdom. The latter title gave him a seat in House of Lords, thereby vacating his seat in the House of Commons. He was promoted from lieutenant to captain in the Yeomanry on 25 November 1874.

On 8 April 1878, he was appointed a deputy lieutenant of Surrey. He sold the family estates around Churchtown, County Cork in 1889.

== Notes ==
Parliament of the United Kingdom
Preceded by William Townley Mitford	Member of Parliament for Midhurst; February 1874 – August 1874	Succeeded by Sir Henry Holland
Peerage of Ireland
Preceded by George Perceval	Earl of Egmont; 1874–1897	Succeeded by Augustus Perceval
