= Bassingbourn cum Kneesworth =

Civil parish in Cambridgeshire, England

Coordinates: 52.0775°N 0.0592°W

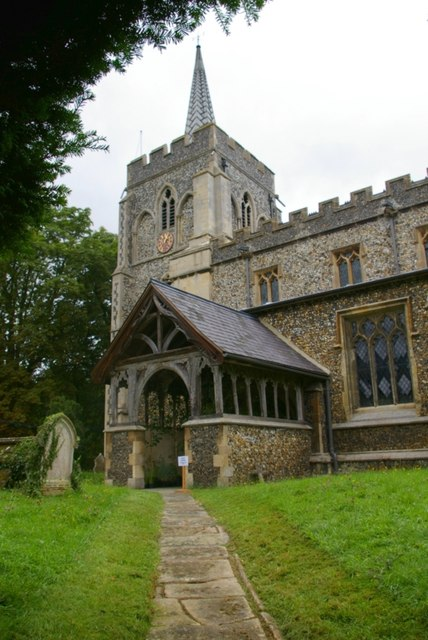
- Church of St Peter and St Paul

- Location within Cambridgeshire
- Population: 3,583 (2011 Census)
- OS grid reference: TL331439
- District: South Cambridgeshire
- Shire county: Cambridgeshire
- Region: East
- Country: England
- Sovereign state: United Kingdom
- Post town: ROYSTON
- Postcode district: SG8
- Dialling code: 01763
- Police: Cambridgeshire
- Fire: Cambridgeshire
- Ambulance: East of England

Bassingbourn cum Kneesworth is a civil parish in the South Cambridgeshire district of Cambridgeshire, England, 14 miles south-west of Cambridge and just north of Royston, Hertfordshire. Since the 1960s the parish contains the villages of Bassingbourn and Kneesworth.

The parish is astride the Roman Ermine Street (now the A1198 and formerly the A14), and the two ancient tracks, Icknield Way and Ashwell Street. The Prime Meridian passes just to the east of the parish.

== History ==
The ancient parish of Bassingbourn was an approximately rectangular area of 3,381 acres (1,368 ha). Its long nearly-straight western boundary mostly follows an ancient field path that separates it from Litlington, and its straight eastern boundary is formed by the Roman Ermine Street, dividing it from Whaddon and Kneesworth. Its southern boundary with Hertfordshire originally followed the ancient Icknield Way, but as Royston grew, part of the parish was transferred to Hertfordshire. The border now follows the A505 as it by-passes Royston. In 1966 the neighbouring parish of Kneesworth was added to the parish to form Bassingbourn cum Kneesworth, a total area of 4,302 acres (1,741 ha).

The village of Bassingbourn built up just to the north of the ancient track Ashwell Street, two kilometres to the north of the Icknield Way. The Romans had previously built Ermine Street (the imperial highway linking London with York), which runs past the east side of the present barracks a kilometre to the east of the village.

Listed as Basingborne in the Domesday Book, Bassingbourn takes its name from 'Bassa', an Anglo-Saxon who, some 1,200 years ago, with his band of followers settled by the 'bourn' or stream in this area.

After the Norman invasion in 1066, Comte Alan of Brittany was given the desirable manor of Bassingbourn, which was mentioned in the Domesday Book of 1086. His descendant Warin de Bassingbourn, a supporter of King John in the baronial rebellion of 1212. He built a fortified manor house one mile west-southwest of the present barracks, now known as the John O'Gaunt Castle.

In 1511 a grand miracle play was held in the village, which throughout that century was also the site of an annual great fair. The Royston-Hitchin Railway line opened in 1851, just crossing the very southern end of the parish.

=== Bassingbourn Barracks ===
An airfield in the north of the parish opened in 1938 and was used for three years for bomber training. Between 1942 and 1945 it was home to a USAAF 91st Bombardment Group heavy bomber squadron, followed by an RAF air transport squadron, and between 1951 and 1969 by two RAF training squadrons. After 1969 it was a training depot for the Queen's Division. It subsequently served as a base for the Army Training Regiment Bassingbourn. In 2014 the site was closed, before being used to train Libyan soldiers as part of an agreement following the overthrow of Colonel Gaddafi in 2011. This arrangement was cancelled following incidents in Cambridge involving some Libyan trainees.As of 2015, the site was mothballed. The USAAF base features significantly in Sam Halpert's 1997 novel based on his experiences as a navigator in B-17s, A Real Good War.

==== Re-opening ====
In December 2018, Bassingbourn Barracks was reopened as home to Mission Training Mobilisation Centre (MTMC), a unit responsible for training troops for operations abroad. MTMC had re-located from Risborough Barracks, Shorncliffe Army Camp and Lydd Ranges in Kent. Construction work is underway to allow other elements of MTMC to relocate from Chetwynd Barracks in Chilwell to Bassingbourn Barracks.

=== Kneesworth ===
Originally a separate parish of 997 acres (403 ha), Kneesworth grew on the Roman Ermine Street (now known as the Old North Road) where the Bassingbourn to Meldreth road crossed it, and its parish covered land to the east of the road. Recorded as Cnesworth in around 1218, the name Kneesworth possibly means "enclosure of a man called Cyneheah", and suggests that the settlement formed as an Anglo-Saxon farmstead.

The former manor house, Kneesworth Hall, was home to the Nightingale family, a member of the landed aristocracy, between 1610 and 1831. In 1904, it was rebuilt as an Edwardian mansion by Sydney Holland, 2nd Viscount Knutsford. In 1947, it opened as a residential boys' school and after being sold to the council in 1968 was known as Kneesworth House Approved School until its closure in 1986. The hall is now Kneesworth House Hospital.

== Church ==
The parish church in Bassingbourn has been dedicated to St Peter and St Paul since at least the 15th century. The present building consists of a chancel, aisled and clerestoried nave with south porch and south chapel, and west tower. The present building dates largely from the 14th century, but incorporates some stonework of an earlier building. The west tower dates from the 13th century but was extensively rebuilt in the 19th century. The church was refaced in limestone in the 19th century.

Kneesworth has fallen into the ecclesiastical parish of Bassingbourn since the 15th century. It formerly had a chapel dedicated to St Mary Magdalen around 500 metres northwest of Kneesworth Hall. It was still being tended in the 16th century, but was sold in 1549, and no trace now remains. After that, the residents attended Bassingbourn.

== Village life ==
The village has a number of facilities including several shops including a doctor's surgery, a dental surgery, a garage, sub-Post Office, bakeries, coffee shop, chemists, hairdressers, and general grocers.

Bassingbourn has two remaining pubs: The Hoops, occupying a 17th-century building in the village, and The Belle (formerly the Pear Tree) at North End. In the mid 18th century the village had four pubs, The Hoops, The Black Horse, The Bull, and The Bell. The Red Lion opened in the early 19th century, but closed by 1960, and The Bell was renamed The Black Bull in the 19th century before closing in the 1970s. In Kneesworth, Yuva restaurant ( was the Red Lion) lies near the crossroads on the Old North Road and occupies a 17th-century building that was still a farmhouse in 1795. At the corner, the 19th-century pub The Rose occupied a prominent position before being sold in April 1992. A former pub The Hoops was converted into a club in around 1910.

In the late nineteenth century and early twentieth century Bassingbourn's primary industry was coprolite mining, followed by Playle's abattoirs. The mining history was commemorated in 2005 with the erection of a bronze sculpture of dinosaur dung. The largest employer now is Kneesworth House Hospital, a medium security psychiatric unit.

== Demography ==
According to the 2011 census it had a population of 3,583, which includes the resident population of Bassingbourn Barracks. The population of the village, less the population resident at the barracks, is around 2,500.

The Bassingbourn Ward of South Cambridgeshire District includes the parish, as well as the parish of Shingay cum Wendy and the Bassingbourn Barracks.

== Education ==
In the half century after 1570, Bassingbourn had usually a resident schoolmaster, not always licensed. In 1628 the vicar himself was teaching a school. In 1657 £9 a year was granted out of the rectory for the schoolmaster.

On the western edge of the village are located Bassingbourn Village College, Bassingbourn Community Primary School and Bassingbourn Pre-school, providing a continuation of education from the age of 2 1/2 up to school leaving age.

== See also ==
- List of places in Cambridgeshire
