= 1874 Midhurst by-election =

UK Parliamentary by-election

The 1874 Midhurst by-election was fought on 23 September 1874. The by-election was fought due to the succession to a peerage of the incumbent Conservative MP, Charles Perceval. It was won by the Conservative candidate Sir Henry Holland who was unopposed.
