= Sir Henry Holland, 1st Baronet =

British physician and travel writer

Sir Henry Holland Bt FRS
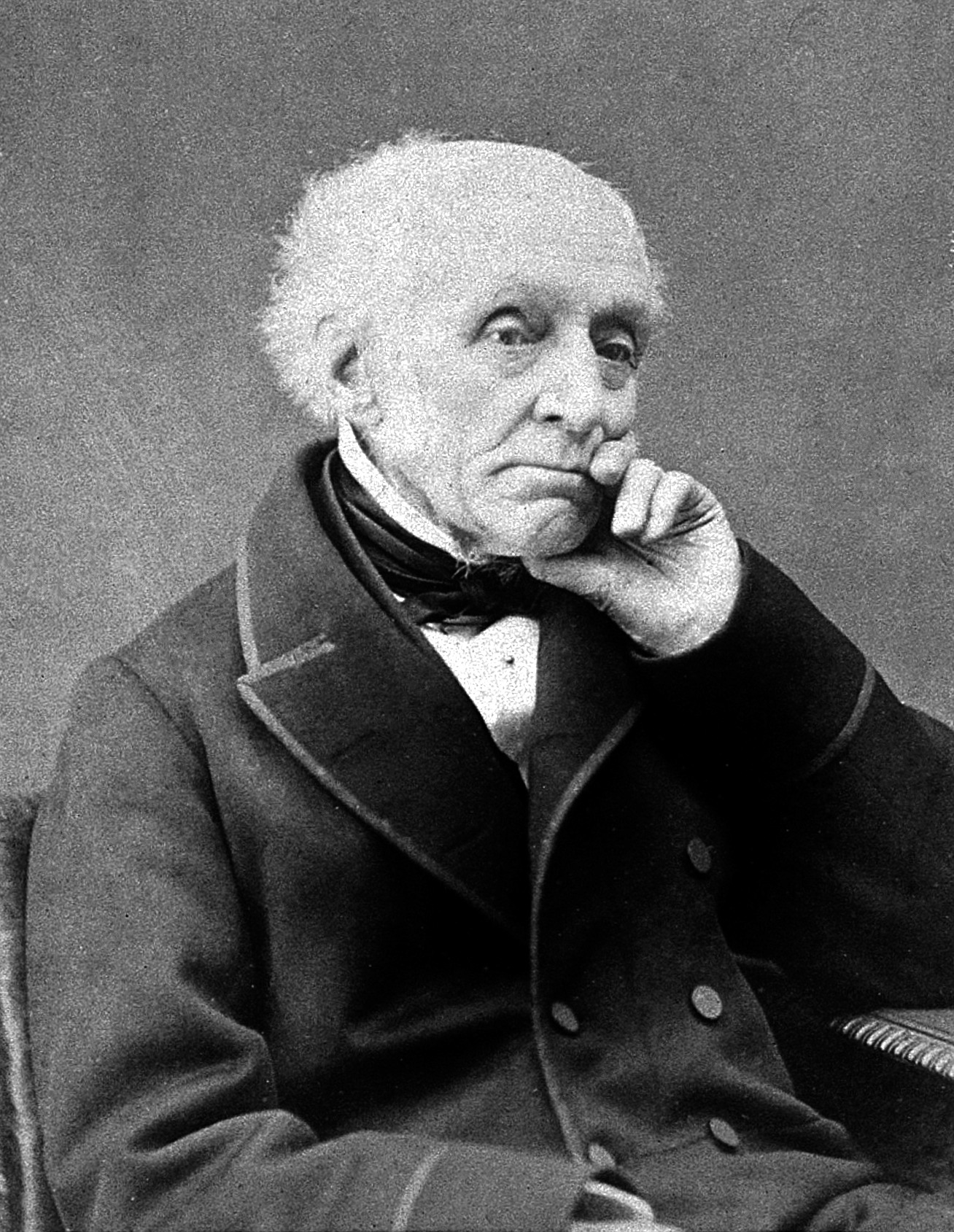
- Born: 27 October 1788
- Died: 27 October 1873 (aged 85)
- Occupations: physician and travel writer
- Writing career
- Genre: travel writing

Sir Henry Holland, 1st Baronet, FRS (27 October 1788 – 27 October 1873) was an English physician and travel writer.

== Early life ==
Born in Knutsford, Cheshire, Holland was the son of the physician Peter Holland (1766–1853) and his wife Mary Willets. Peter's sister Elizabeth was the mother of the novelist Elizabeth Gaskell, and Mary was the niece of the potter Josiah Wedgwood. He studied medicine at Edinburgh University (MA, 1811).

== Career ==
He had an extensive practice and was Domestic Physician to Caroline, Princess of Wales (briefly in 1814) and Physician Extraordinary to William IV and to Queen Victoria. He was also Physician in Ordinary to Queen Victoria in 1852. He was elected a Fellow of the Royal Society in January, 1815 and served on the council three times. He was created a Baronet in 1853.

Scientifically, Holland made an early contribution to the Germ theory of disease in his essay "On the hypothesis of insect life as a cause of disease?" in "Medical Notes and Reflections", 1839.

== Travel ==
Holland gained fame through his travel writings, having travelled to Iceland and through the Balkans and the Iberian Peninsula, while the British were at war with France. He was also a talented society physician, and between his good looks, his charm, and his experiences and conversation, he was much in demand.

On 4 December 1836 Holland attended a party hosted by Fanny and Hensleigh Wedgwood for their relatives, shortly after Charles Darwin returned from the Beagle voyage. Darwin had sent home packets of his "journal", and he asked his relatives about captain FitzRoy's intent of incorporating it into the published Narrative. Holland "looked over a few pages, and evidently thought that it would not be worth while to publish it alone, as it would be partly going over the same ground with the Captain." Darwin thought the "little Dr talked much good sense", but Emma Wedgwood did not think Holland "any judge as to what is amusing or interesting", and Hensleigh felt if Holland "thought it would not do for publication it only affects my opinion of his taste & not the least in the world the merits of the thing itself". Darwin's Journal and Remarks became well known as The Voyage of the Beagle.

Holland died on his 85th birthday, 27 October 1873, at his house in Brook Street, London.

== Family ==
In 1822 he married, Margaret Emma Caldwell (1795–1830, known as Emma), with whom he had two sons and two daughters:

- Henry Holland, 1st Viscount Knutsford (1825–1914)
- Francis James Holland (1828–1907)
- Emily Mary Holland (1824–1908) married Charles Buxton; their son was Sydney Buxton, 1st Earl Buxton
- Elinor Anne Holland (1826–1829)

Emma died on 2 February 1830. He later became son-in-law to the wit Sydney Smith whose daughter, Saba, he married as his second wife, with whom he had three daughters:

- Caroline Holland (1835–1909), author of The Notebooks of a Spinster Lady, published posthumously, 1919
- Edith Holland (born and died 1838)
- Gertrude Holland (1840–1898)

== Arms ==
Coat of arms of Sir Henry Holland, 1st Baronet
Crest Out of a crown vallary Or a demi-lion guardant per bend Argent and Azure charged with a bendlet engrailed counterchanged holding in the dexter paw a fleur-de-lis Argent. Escutcheon Per pale Argent and Azure semée-de-lis a lion rampant guardant counterchanged over all a bendlet engrailed Gules. Motto Respice Aspice Prospice

Baronetage of the United Kingdom
New creation	Baronet (of Sandlebridge); 1853–1873	Succeeded by Henry Holland
