= Sydney Holland, 2nd Viscount Knutsford =

British barrister and peer

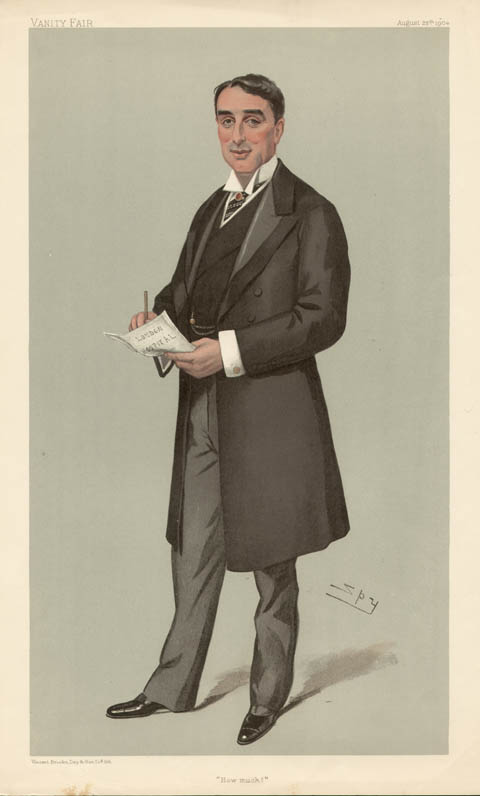
"How Much?" Holland as caricatured by Spy (Leslie Ward) in Vanity Fair, August 1904

Sydney George Holland, 2nd Viscount Knutsford (19 March 1855 – 27 July 1931) was a British barrister and peer.

== Background and education ==
Knutsford was the eldest twin son of the Conservative politician Henry Holland, 1st Viscount Knutsford, and his wife Elizabeth Margaret Hibbert. His grandfather was the physician and travel writer Sir Henry Holland, 1st Baronet. His mother died when he was three years old. He was educated at Wellington College and Trinity Hall, Cambridge, and was called to the Bar in 1879.

== Career ==
In 1898 Knutsford was elected as chairman of the East and West India Dock Company. He was a director of many companies including an English, Scottish and Australian Bank, and the Underground Electric Railways Company. He was also a director of City and South London Railway, London and Scottish Life Assurance Company and was an Honorary Fellow of Trinity Hall, Cambridge. He was made a chairman of Poplar Hospital in 1891 before becoming president in 1920 and he was chairman of the London Hospital House Committee from 1896 to 1931. He succeeded his father as Viscount Knutsford in 1914.

Holland acted as justice of the peace for London and Middlesex, and awarded the Order of Saint John (chartered 1888).

== Family ==
Lord Knutsford married Lady Mary Ashburnham, daughter of Bertram Ashburnham, 4th Earl of Ashburnham, in 1883. They had two daughters. He died in July 1931, aged 76. As he had no sons he was succeeded in his titles by his younger twin brother, Arthur.

His daughters were:

- Hon. Lucy Katherine (15 Sept. 1886)
- Hon. Rachael Mary (6 June 1877), who married Brigadier Lord Douglas Malise Graham son of Douglas Graham, 5th Duke of Montrose and had issue.

== Arms ==
Coat of arms of Sydney Holland, 2nd Viscount Knutsford
Crest Out of a crown vallary Or a demi-lion guardant per bend Argent and Azure charged with a bendlet engrailed counterchanged holding in the dexter paw a fleur-de-lis Argent. Escutcheon Per pale Argent and Azure semée-de-lis a lion rampant guardant counterchanged over all a bendlet engrailed Gules. Supporters On either side a lion guardant Argent gutté de larmes the body charged with two fleurs-de-lis in fess between two bars engrailed Azure. Motto Respice Aspice Prospice

Peerage of the United Kingdom
Preceded by Henry Thurstan Holland	Viscount Knutsford; 1914–1931	Succeeded by Arthur Henry Holland-Hibbert
