= List of conservation areas in Brighton and Hove =

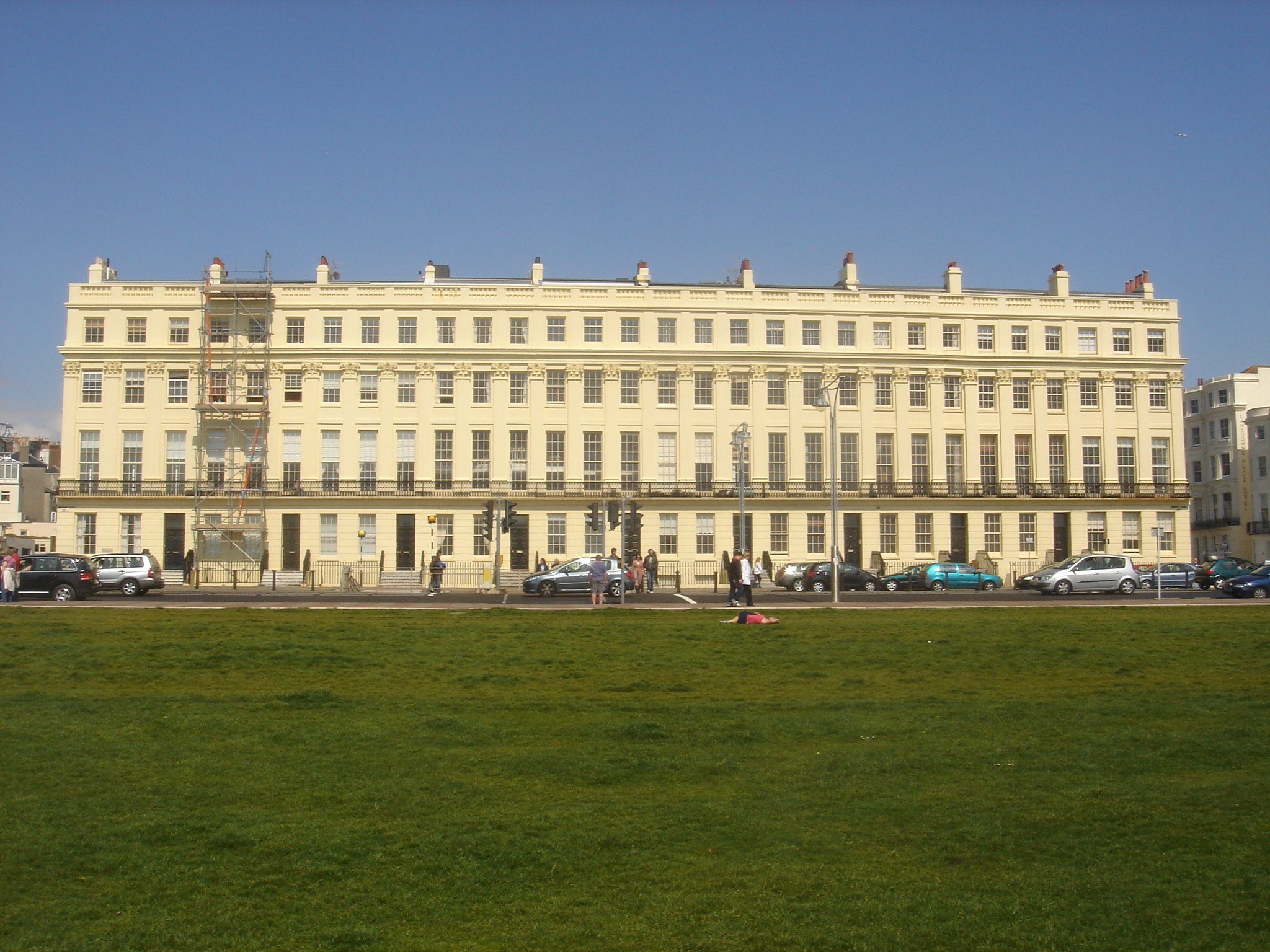
Brunswick Terrace is part of the Brunswick Town conservation area.

There are 34 conservation areas in the city of Brighton and Hove, a seaside resort on the English Channel coast in southeast England. The definition of a conservation area is a principally urban area "of special architectural or historic interest, the character or appearance of which it is desirable to preserve or enhance". Such areas are identified according to criteria defined by Sections 69 and 70 of the Planning (Listed Buildings and Conservation Areas) Act 1990. Brighton and Hove City Council is responsible for creating conservation areas within the city, and expands upon the statutory definition by stating that each area has "high townscape quality [and] its own distinctive character [... which] creates a sense of place".

The city has existed in its present form only since 2000, when Queen Elizabeth II granted city status to the unitary authority of Brighton and Hove, which was in turn created in 1997 by the amalgamation of Brighton and Hove Borough Councils. Before 1997, the two councils were separately responsible for creating and administering conservation areas. Hove Borough Council designated the first two, in 1969: Charles Busby's expansive self-contained Brunswick Town estate, with a twin-terrace centrepiece "as grand as anything in St Petersburg", and the rapidly developed mid-19th-century suburb of Cliftonville, characterised by Italianate villas and large Tudorbethan houses. The following year, Brighton Borough Council set up conservation areas to preserve and improve the historic centres of five ancient downland villages—Ovingdean, Patcham, Preston, Rottingdean and Stanmer—which became part of the urban area in 1928 and 1952 because of boundary changes. Brighton's own architectural set-piece, Thomas Read Kemp's "striking, [...] graceful and imposing" Kemp Town estate of the mid-1820s, by Busby and Amon Wilds, was designated at the same time.

Many more parts of the urban area have been included in conservation areas in subsequent years, either through the creation of new areas or by means of extensions to existing areas. One conservation area, Preston, was split into two (Preston Park and Preston Village) in 1988 after it had been extended several times. Carlton Hill, an inner-city area in the east of Brighton which descended into poverty-stricken slum conditions in the early 20th century, is the most recent addition to the list; about 4 acres (1.6 ha) of its historic centre was designated on 4 July 2008. In 2004, when Carlton Hill had not yet been designated, the proportion of Brighton and Hove's urban area covered by conservation areas was about 18%.

The city's conservation areas vary in character and size. Stanmer—an isolated, rural country estate with a mansion, church and single-street village— is more than 200 times larger than the conservation area surrounding the similarly rural Benfield Barn, on the South Downs above Hangleton. Brunswick Town and Kemp Town, by Busby and Wilds, are famous, high-class 19th-century planned estates, each with dozens of listed buildings (including many at the highest Grade I); each represents "the pinnacle of [their] work and ... considerable achievements in domestic architecture and town design". In contrast, areas such as Sackville Gardens and Cliftonville are small-scale, piecemeal suburban developments with varied architectural styles and few or no listed buildings. Woodland Drive and Tongdean have large 20th-century houses, while the Engineerium conservation area consists of formerly industrial buildings.

The government encourages but does not require local authorities to produce studies appraising the character of conservation areas. As of 2017, two of Brighton and Hove's areas lacked formal appraisal documents. The corresponding figure in 2004, when the city's conservation strategy was last revised, was 11.

== Conservation areas ==
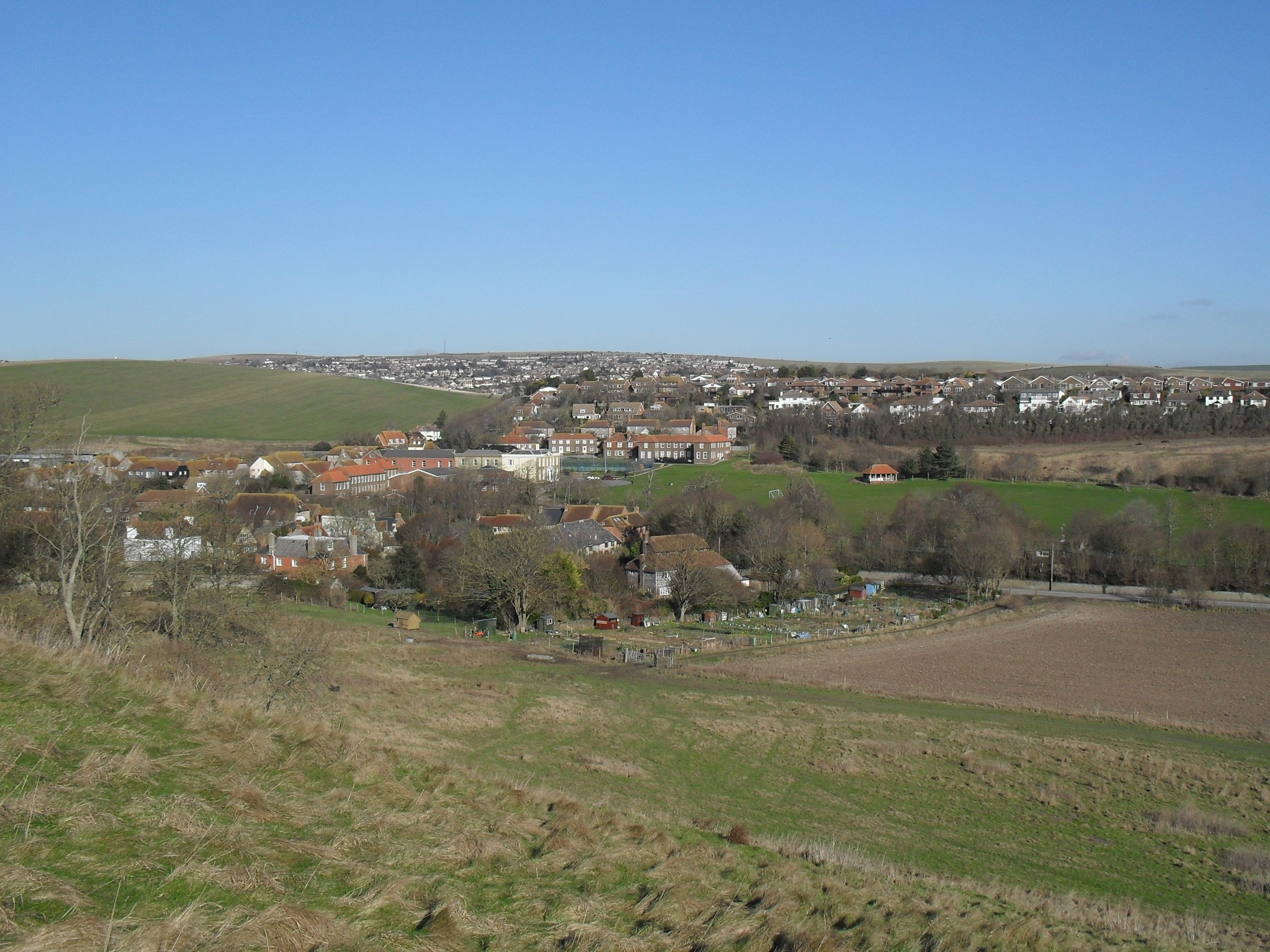
In 1970, nearly 50 acres (20 ha) of Ovingdean—an ancient village east of Brighton—was designated a conservation area.

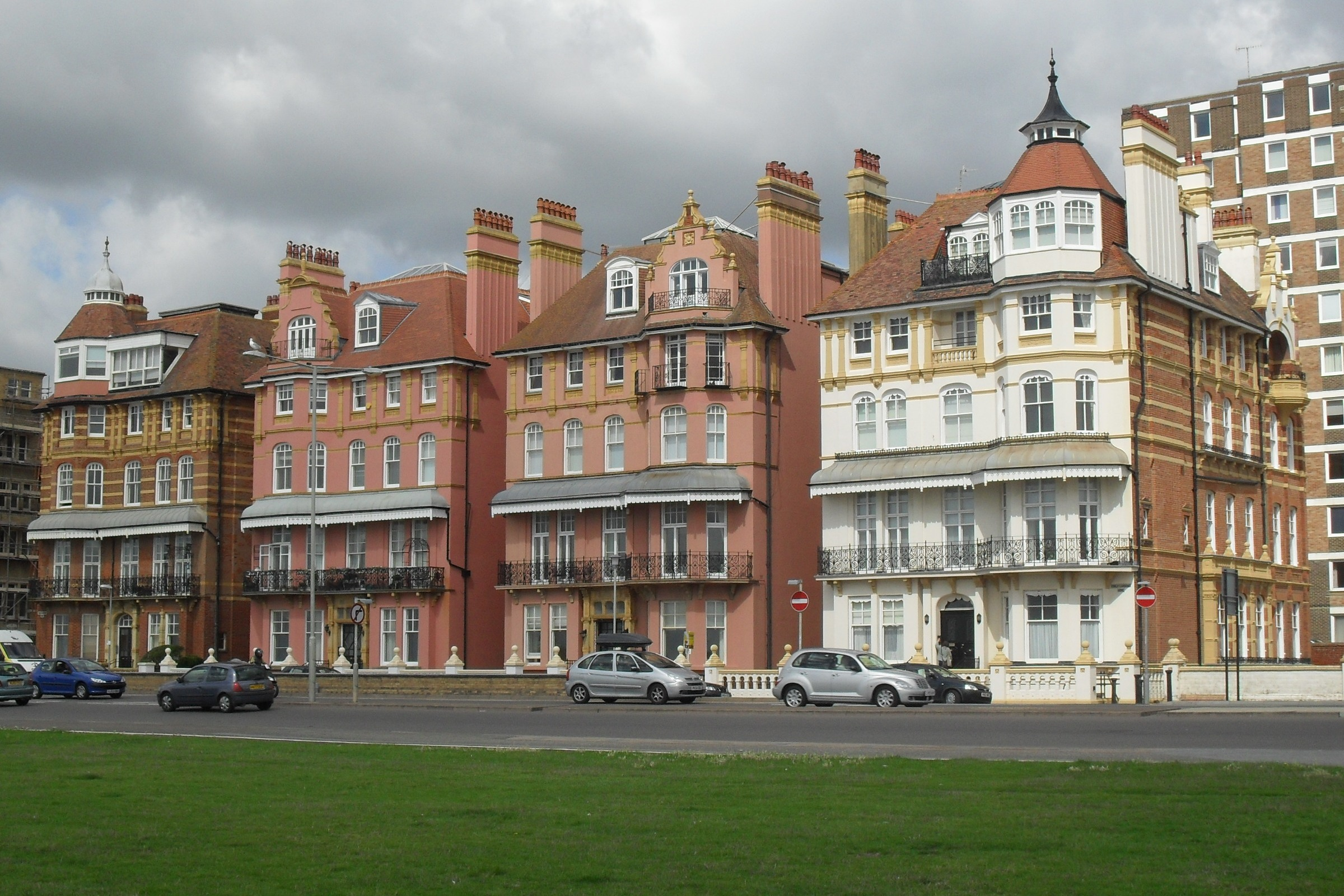
The houses of Kings Gardens, on Hove seafront, are in The Avenues conservation area.

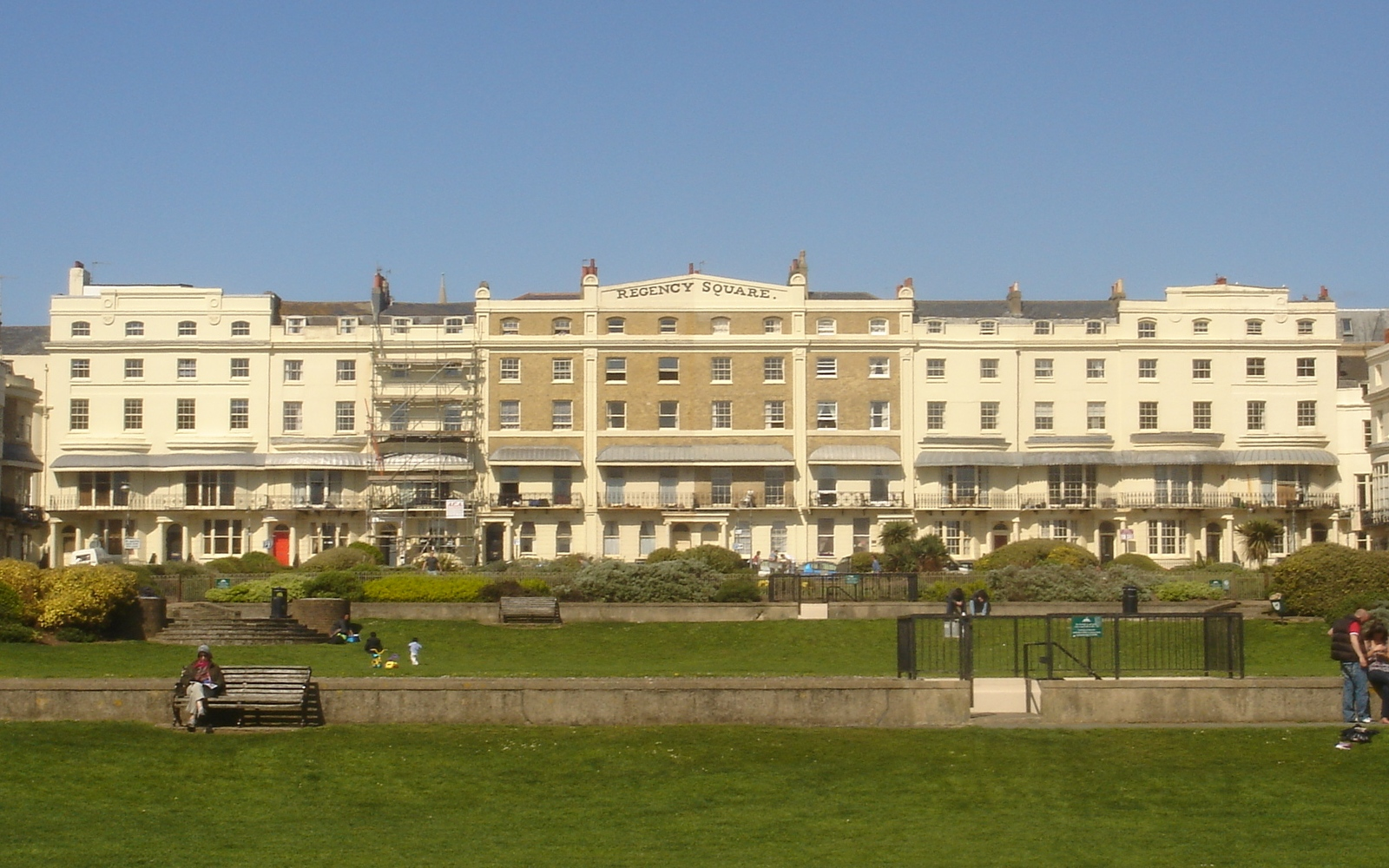
Regency Square is at the heart of the conservation area of the same name.

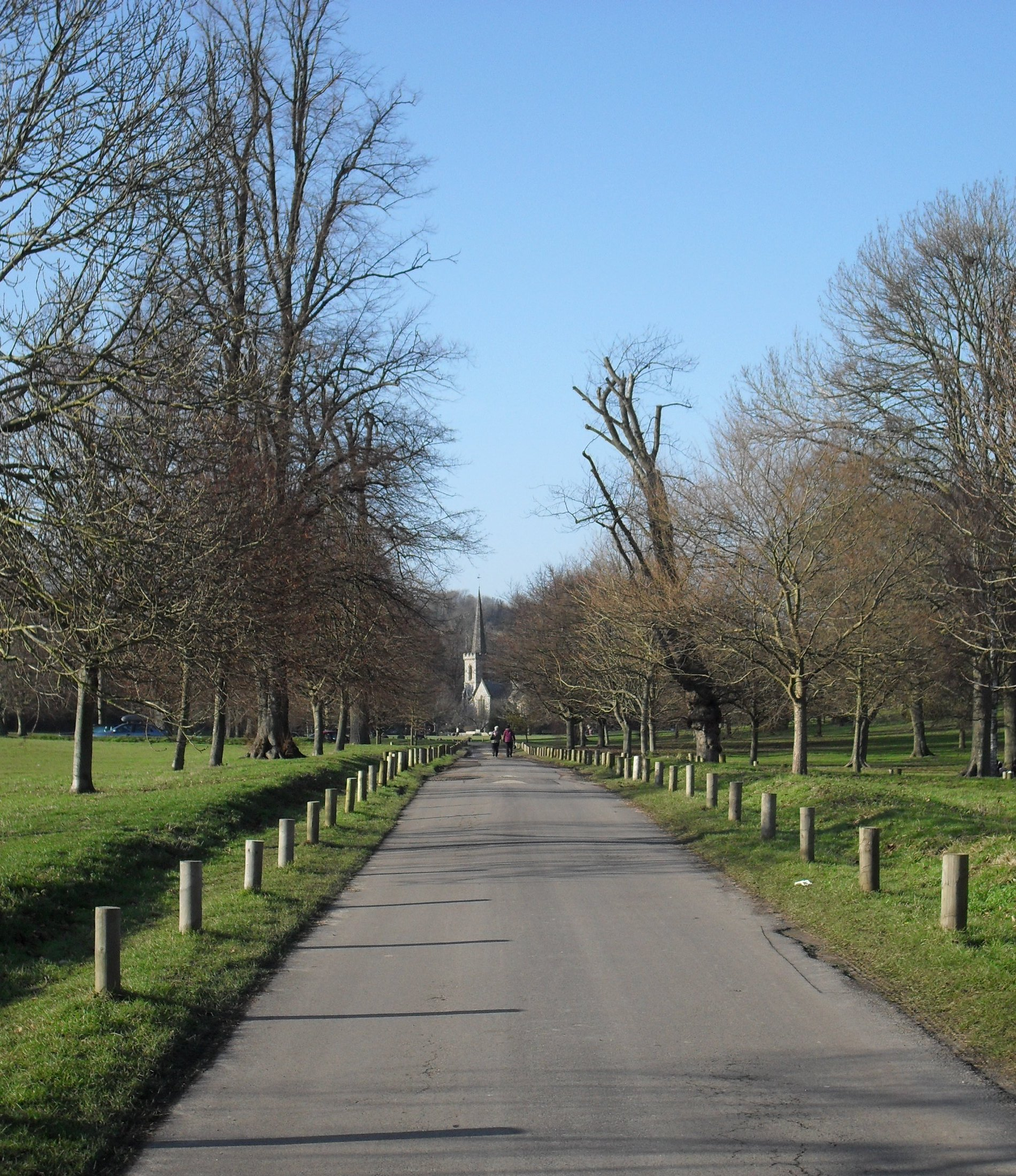
Stanmer (park and church pictured) is a rural area on the edge of the city.

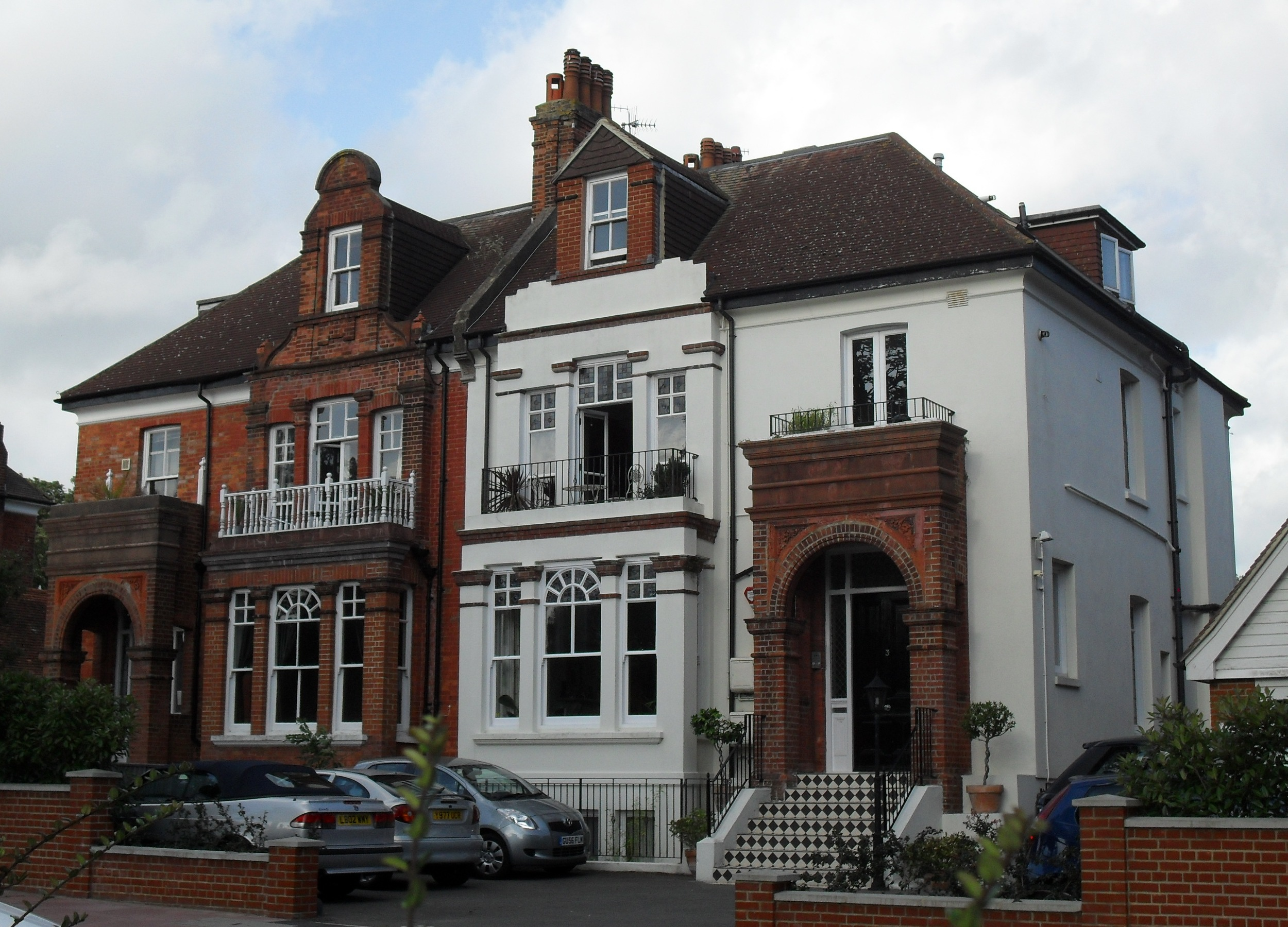
Two-storey brick houses with decorative ironwork and gables characterise the Preston Park conservation area.

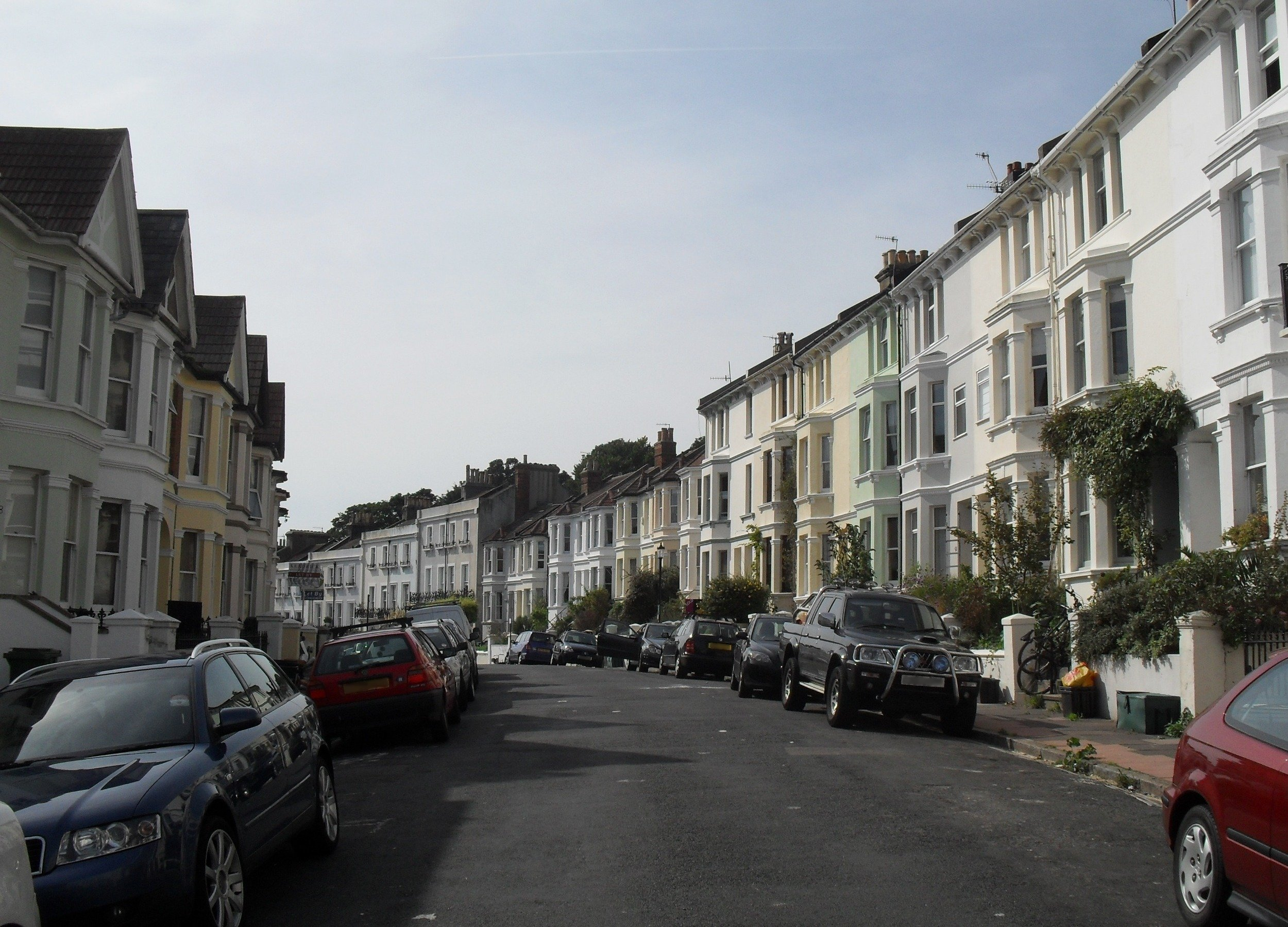
Round Hill has mid-19th-century terraced houses.

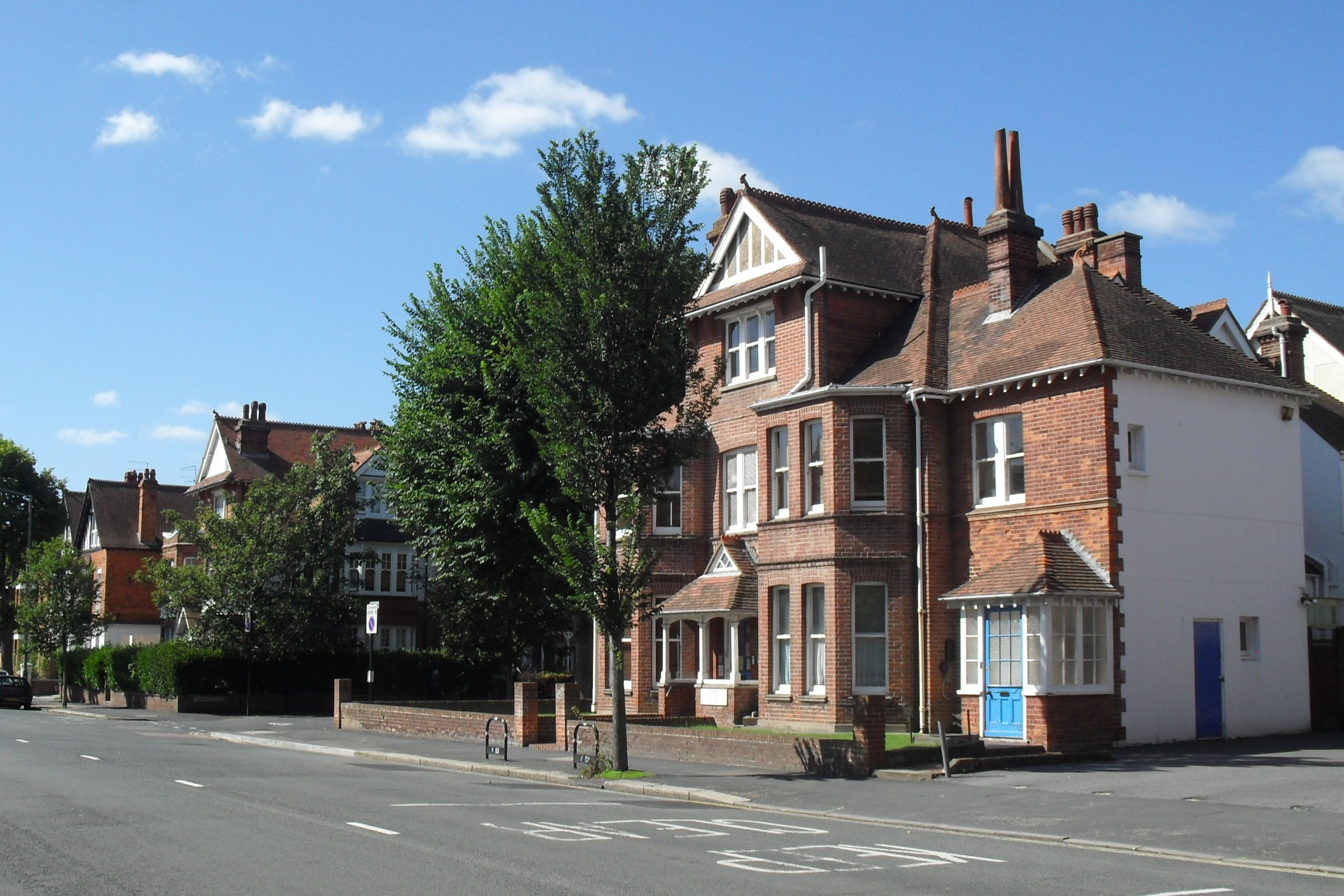
The expansive gabled houses of the Pembroke & Princes conservation area date from the late 1890s.

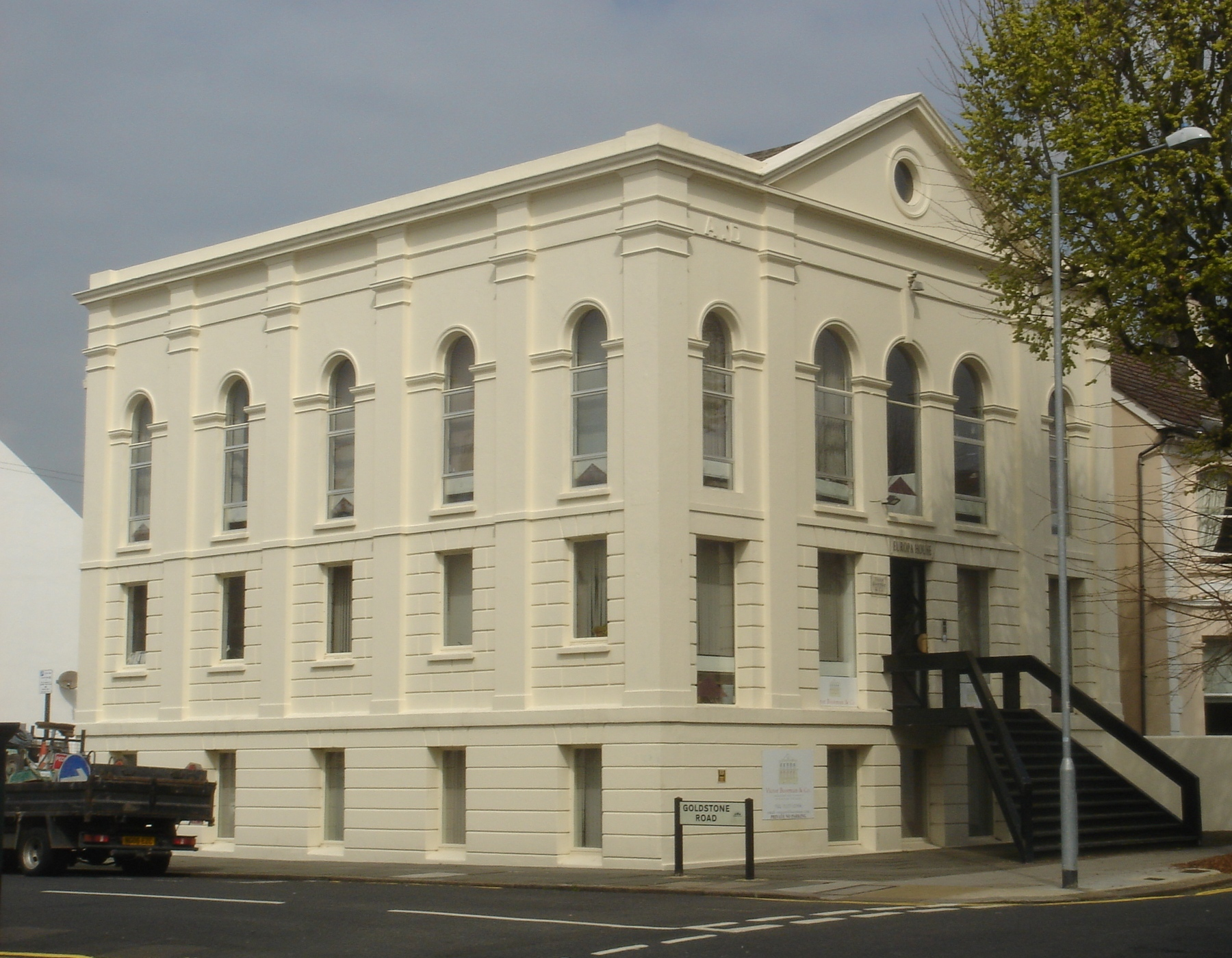
The former Goldstone Villas Methodist Church, in the Hove Station conservation area, was converted into offices in the 1960s.

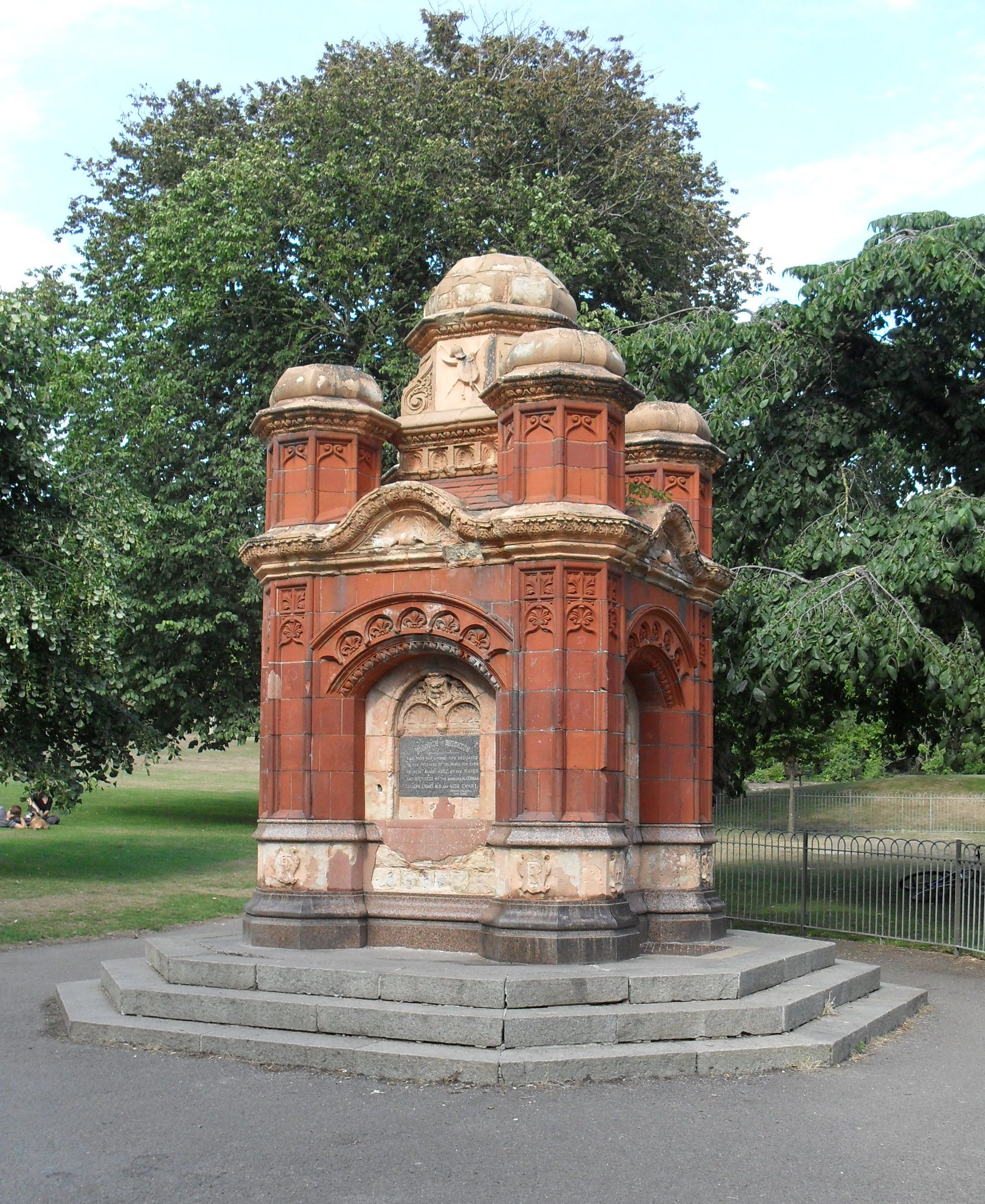
This 19th-century drinking fountain is one of several distinctive structures in Queen's Park.

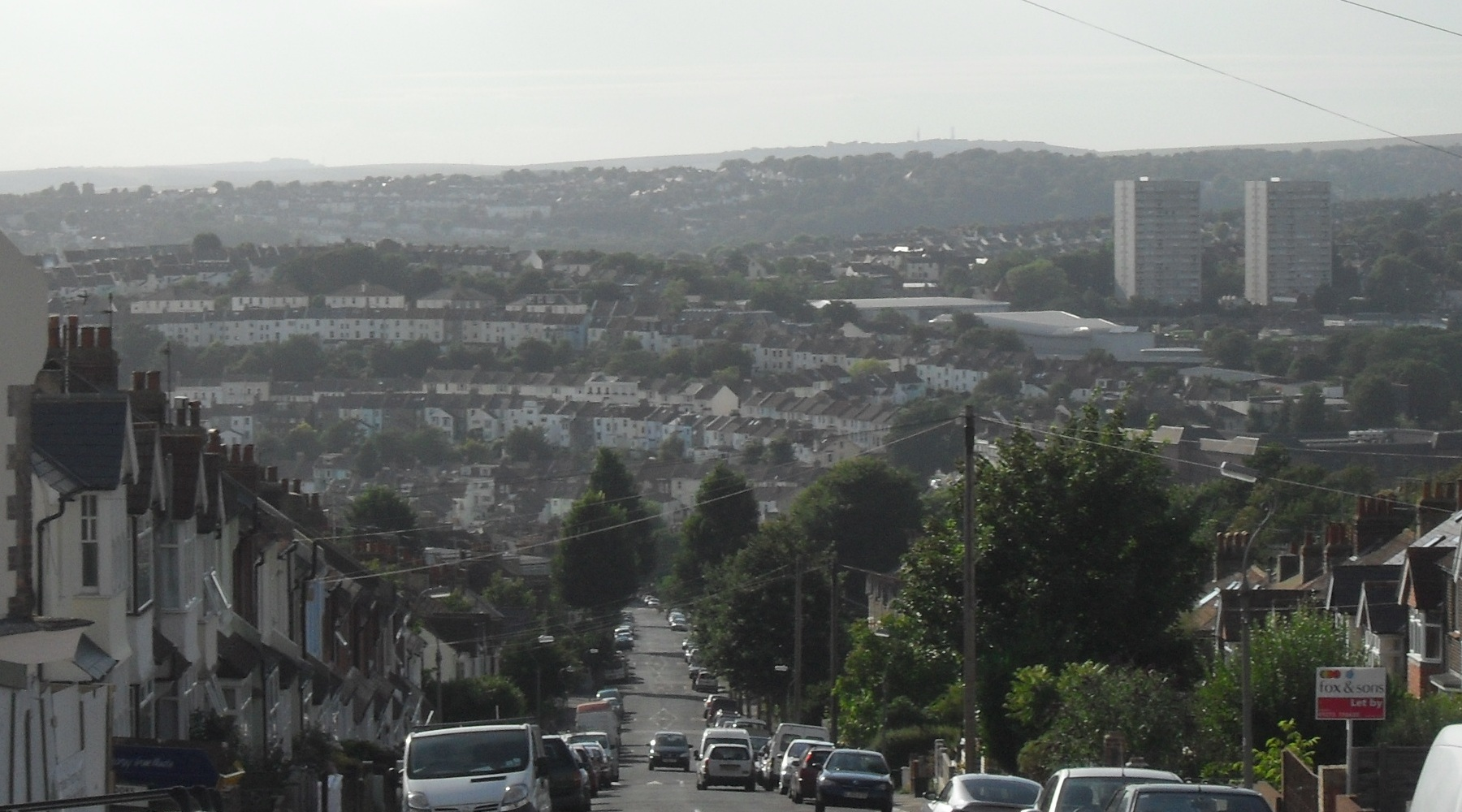
Topographical features can add to a conservation area's character. Round Hill Crescent, seen from Hartington Road to the east, "curves and changes height dramatically along its length". The Preston Park conservation area is beyond.

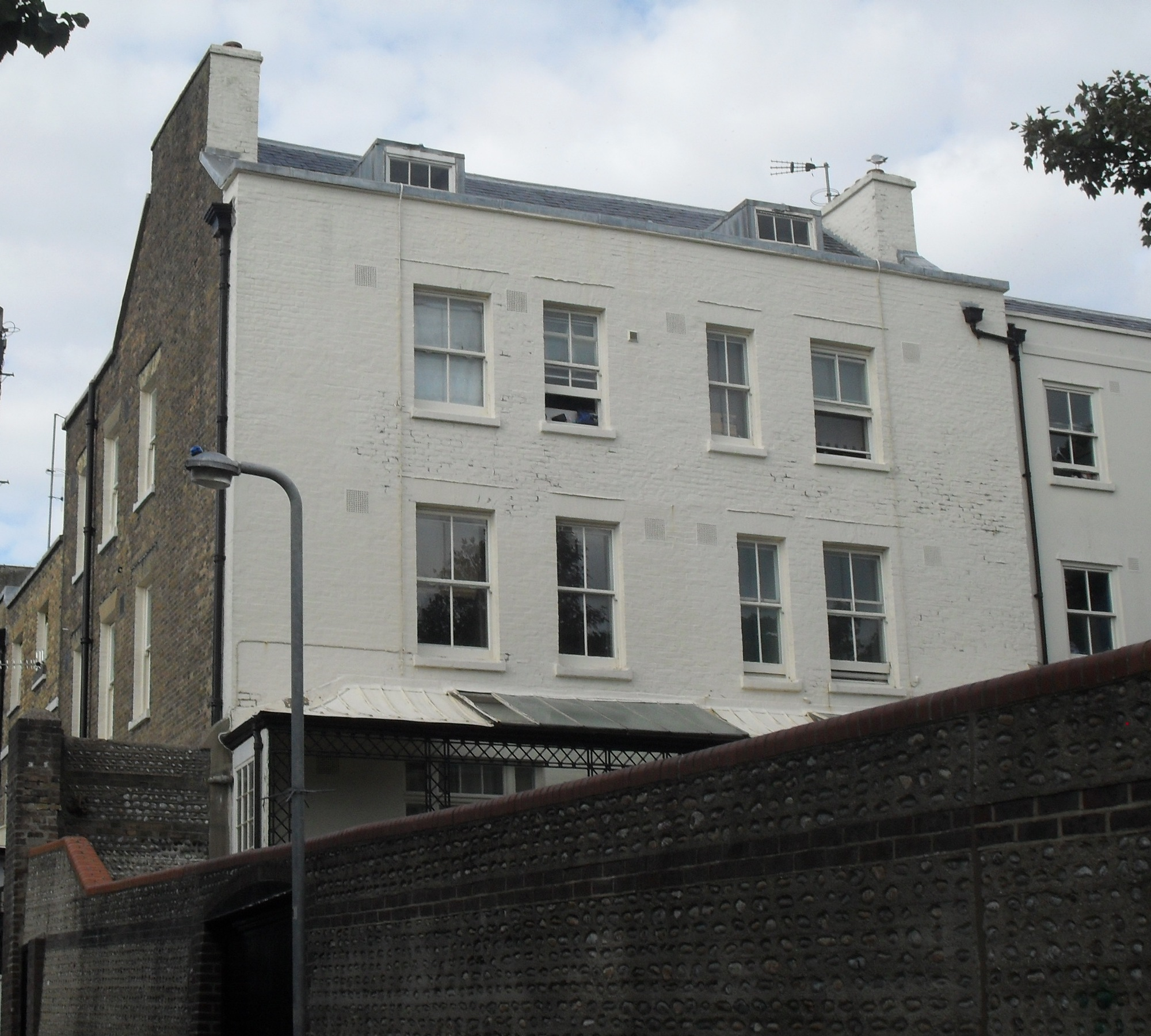
1 Tilbury Place, built in about 1815, is one of several "fragments of early 19th-century Brighton" in the substantially redeveloped Carlton Hill area.

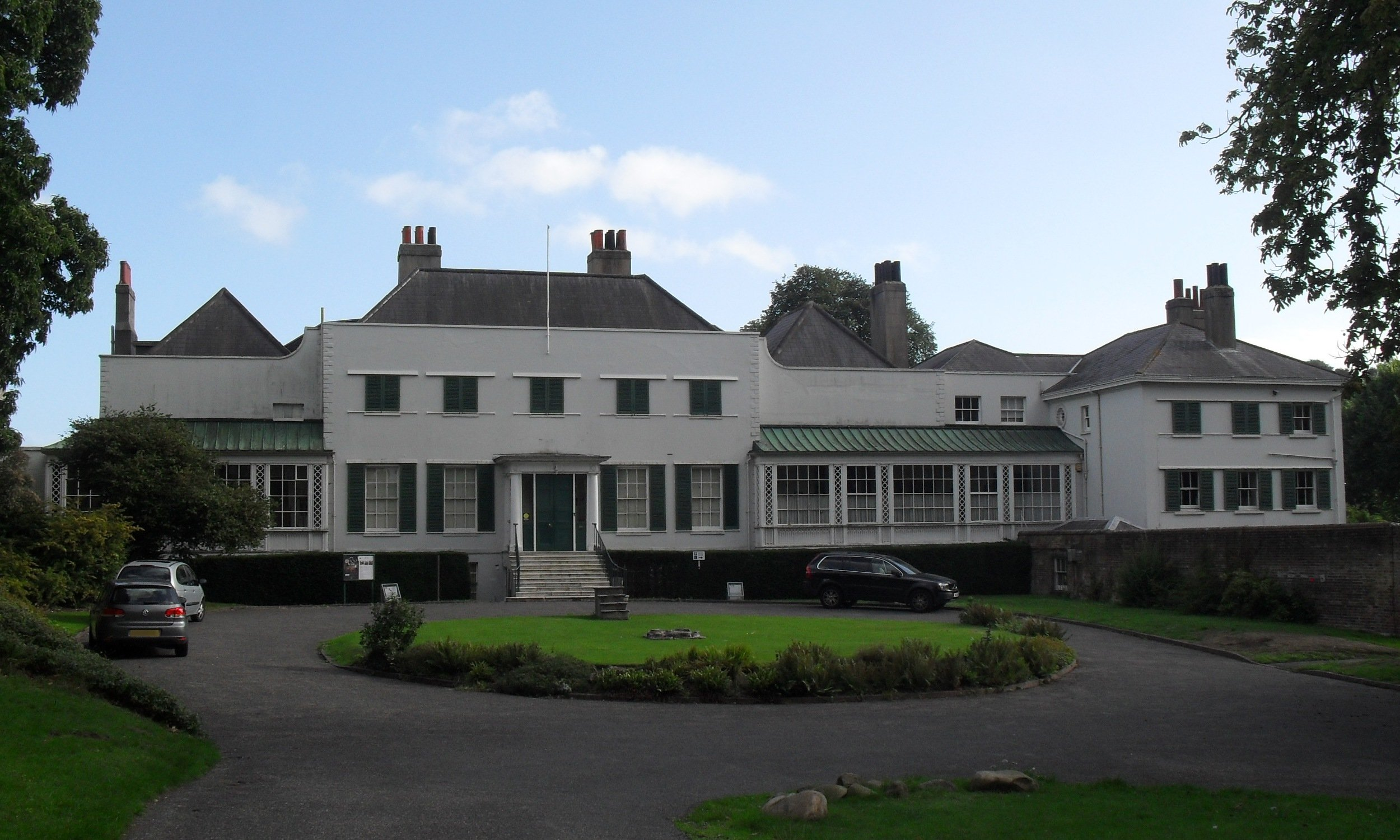
Preston Manor, rebuilt from its 13th-century origins in 1738, is at the heart of the Preston Village conservation area.

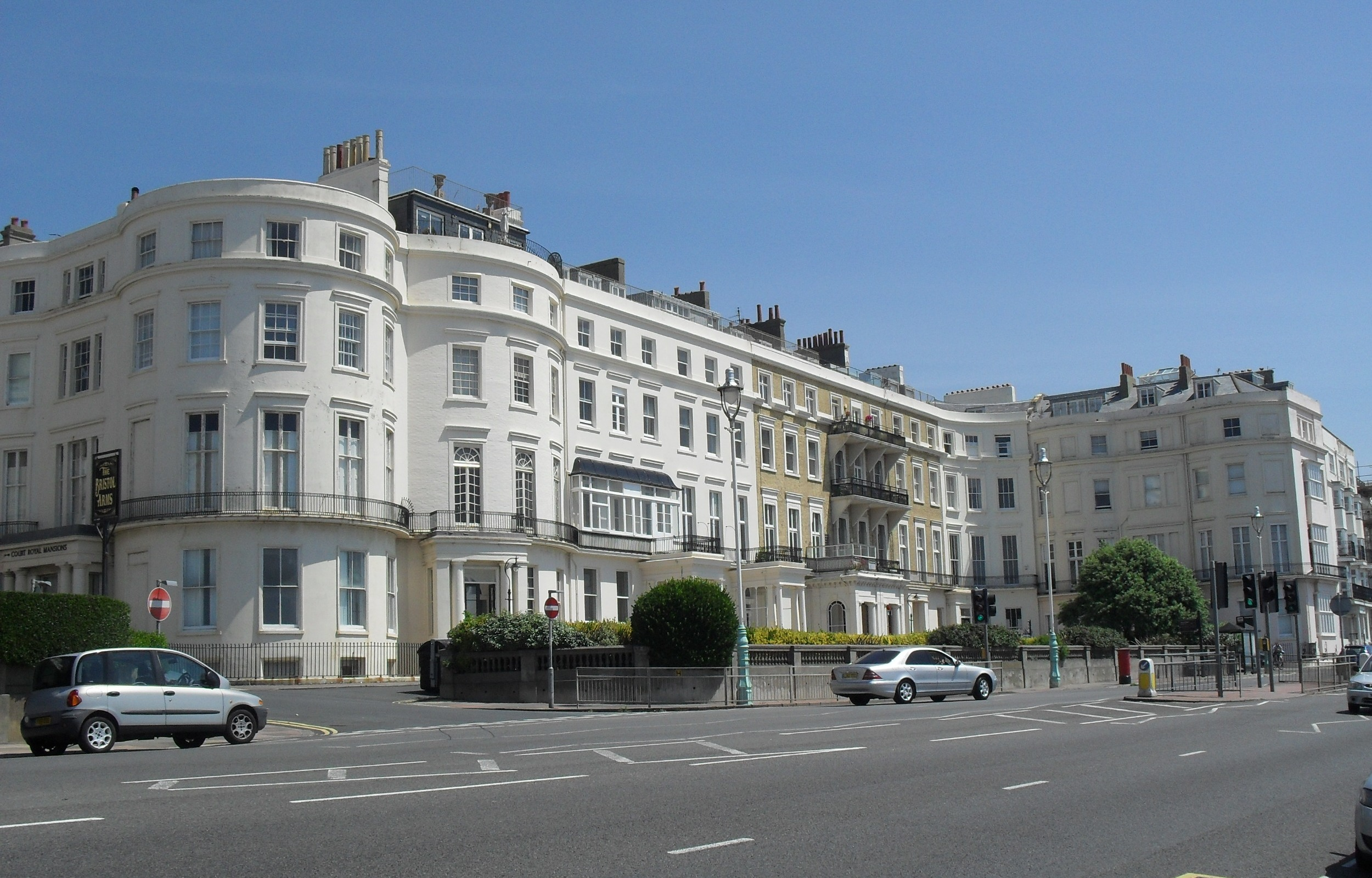
East Cliff has many 19th-century squares and terraces, such as Eastern Terrace.

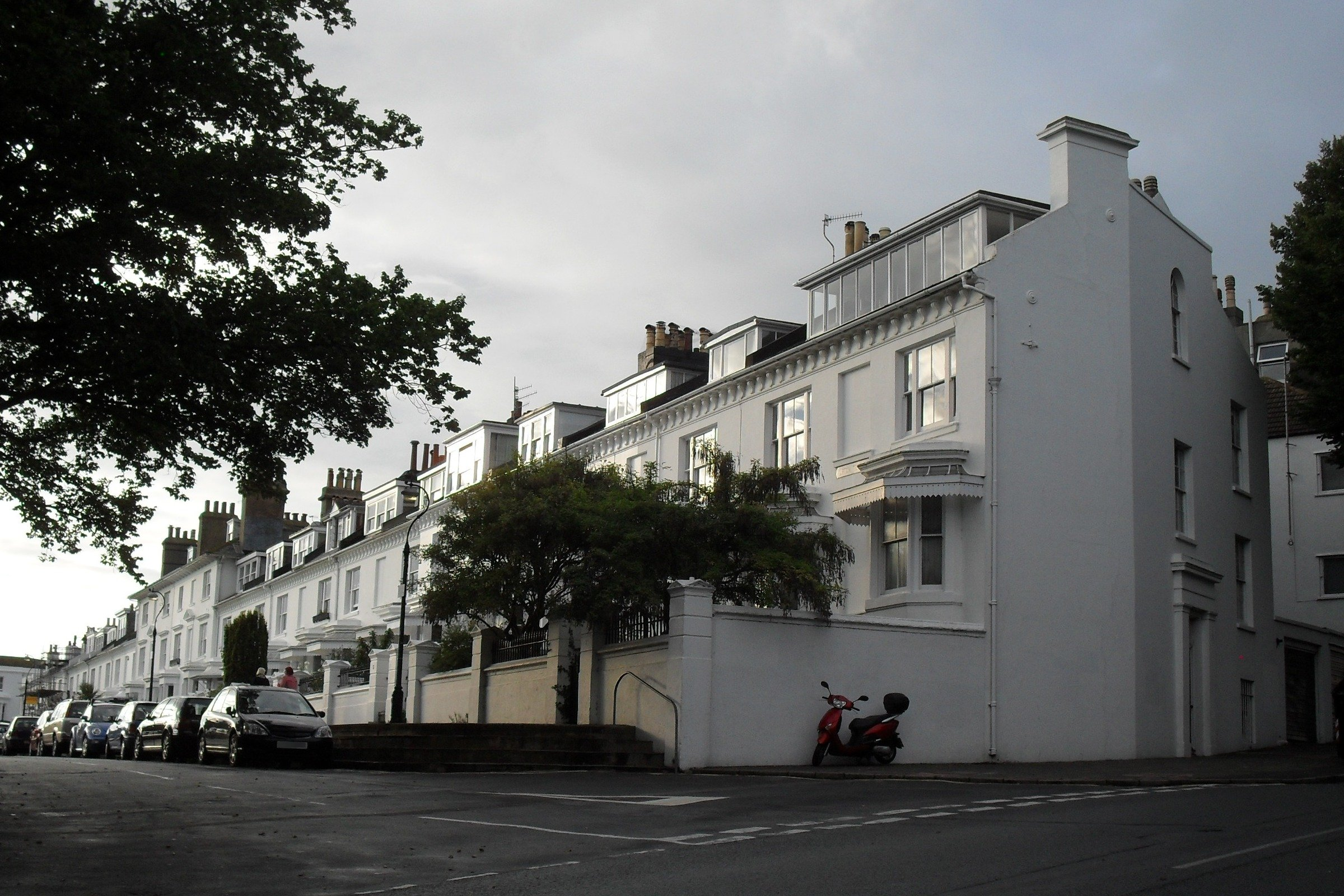
Clifton Terrace is part of the Montpelier & Clifton Hill conservation area.

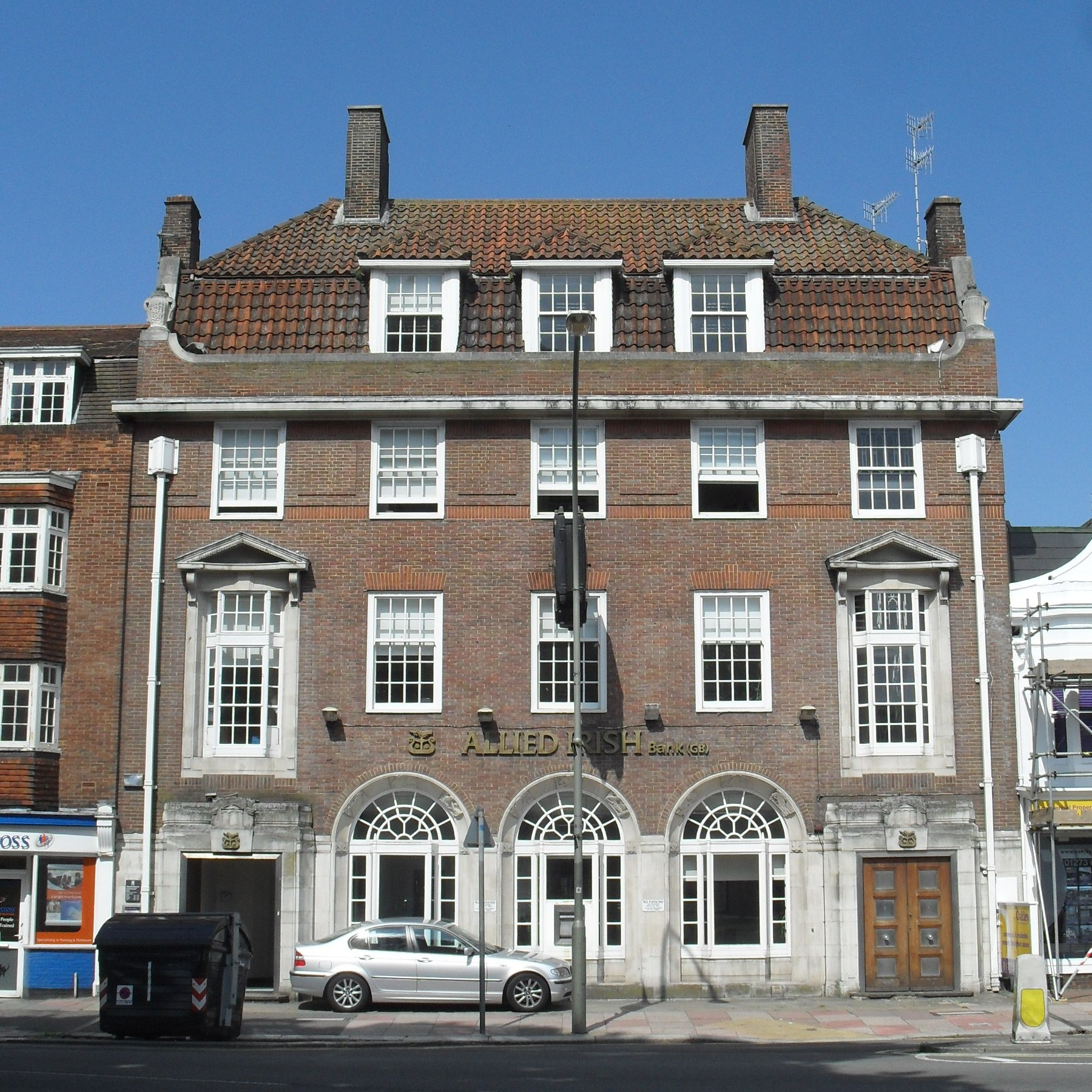
Valley Gardens has buildings of various ages, sizes and uses, including the "elegant" Neo-Georgian Allied Irish Bank at 20–22 Marlborough Place, Brighton.

Name	Size	Date	Notes	Refs
Benfield Barn, Hangleton	1.43 acres (0.58 ha)	1989	The city's smallest conservation area includes a Grade II-listed barn—part of an ancient farm next to the former Benfield Manor house—and the four terraced cottages which replaced it. The red-brick and flint barn may be late-18th-century, and the houses were built in 1871 for farm workers. They are of yellow stock brick with slate-tiled roofs.	
Brunswick Town, Hove	95.92 acres (38.82 ha)	1969	Local architecture evolved into "serious Neoclassical" at this carefully planned and landscaped set-piece in the mid-1820s. Columns of various orders, pilasters and bow fronts characterise the square and its flanking terraces, all of which enjoy sea views and access to extensive lawns. Smaller squares and streets, such as Adelaide Crescent, Lansdowne Place and Palmeira Square, surround the centrepiece, and are slightly more modest in scope. Stuccoed façades, slate roofs, consistent building heights and long parapets contribute to the impression of regularity and formality.	
Carlton Hill	4.05 acres (1.64 ha)	2008	This early-19th-century working-class area was comprehensively redeveloped in the mid-20th century after degenerating into a slum, but a few old buildings remain: Tilbury Place is a good example of Georgian architecture, George Cheesman junior's severely Classical church dates from 1839, and the cobble-fronted Mighell Farmhouse survived when adjacent buildings were demolished for Amex House, a large office block. The area's character derives from these buildings, its site on a steep hill with long views, and the survival of fragments of old street layouts and boundary walls in places.	
Cliftonville, Hove	40.05 acres (16.21 ha)	1969	A small area of "delightful mid-Victorian houses", in a villa style with angled bay windows and exterior ironwork, this 1850s suburb is an example of the long-lasting influence of the Regency style on Victorian domestic architecture. The increasingly fashionable Italianate style is also evident. Slight differences can be seen between individual houses: plots were sold speculatively, so most houses were built to individuals' requirements. Sash windows with valances are characteristic features.	
College Conservation Area	18.60 acres (7.53 ha)	1988	The College Conservation Area in Brighton is a 7.53-hectare region that was designated as a conservation area in 1988. The conservation area has an approximately rectangular plan, bounded on the southwest by Eastern Road and the northwest by Sutherland Road and most of College Terrace and extending to Canning Street to the northeast and includes all of Walpole Road and Walpole Terrace to the southeast, as well as including the western end of Belle Vue Gardens. The area is home to a diverse community of residents, with a mix of prestigious semi-detached villas to the west and smaller artisan terraced houses closer to the station to the east. The conservation area is of architectural and historic interest, and the character and appearance of the area are preserved and enhanced.	
Denmark Villas, Hove	7.42 acres (3.00 ha)	1984	This road was a northern extension of Cliftonville, built on the way to Hove railway station (opened in 1865). The area has well-spaced Italianate houses in a more modestly detailed style than the rest of Cliftonville, with prominent architraves, quoins and eaves, yellow brickwork and mosaic tiled paths. The road is lined with mature trees, contributing to its character.	
East Cliff	153.99 acres (62.32 ha)	1973	Hundreds of listed buildings, a strong and little changed street pattern and the prevalence of Regency architecture characterise the East Cliff, which developed from the late 18th century because of its proximity to the fashionable Old Steine. Many landowners held small plots, so cohesive large-scale developments were not possible; instead, streets tended to follow a north–south alignment defined by old field boundaries. The houses and hotels of Marine Parade, the east–west clifftop road (built from 1827 on the site of a trackway), present a long stuccoed façade which has been described as "unsurpassed anywhere in Britain".	
Engineerium, West Blatchington	8.89 acres (3.60 ha)	1982	Built in 1866 as the Goldstone Pumping Station to provide more piped water for Brighton and Hove's rapidly growing population, this became a museum in 1976. Considered to be excellent examples of 19th-century industrial design, the brick buildings are intricately detailed with Classical motifs and multicoloured brickwork. The tall chimney is a significant landmark.	
Hangleton	15.54 acres (6.29 ha)	1984	Hangleton became a postwar overspill estate, with what Pevsner called "a grisly set of parodies of the English cottage", but at the centre a set of ancient buildings remain around a park. St Helen's Church has changed little since the 11th century, and Hangleton Manor is Hove's oldest secular building. Now used as a restaurant, it retains its old dovecote and associated cottages.	
Hove Station	14.56 acres (5.89 ha)	1996	Built as Cliftonville in 1865, Hove railway station soon stimulated middle-class residential development. Goldstone Villas, a wide tree-lined avenue with terraced houses in various styles, was developed in the 1880s and 1890s. Brick in pale colours such as yellow, buff and brown predominates; slate roofs are also common, and many windows are canted bays. Some large-scale late-20th-century developments have affected the area. The Ralli Memorial Hall, a red brick and stone Renaissance-style building of 1913, and a Neoclassical former chapel of 1878 (now an office) provide variety.	
Kemp Town	47.94 acres (19.40 ha)	1970	The estate has two sea-facing terraces (Arundel and Chichester Terrace) linked to a three-sided square (Sussex Square) by Lewes Crescent, an 840-foot (260 m) double curve of 28 stuccoed houses with large Corinthian pilasters at regular intervals. Charles Busby's original designs were followed most closely in the crescent; the 300-by-550-foot (91 m × 168 m) square took longer to complete and diverges from his plan. Chichester Terrace was finished only in 1855. Thomas Cubitt built 37 of the estate's 106 houses. Surrounding mews and backstreets, the private gardens at the centre, original street furniture and the seafront esplanade (by Henry Kendall) are included in the conservation area.	
Montpelier & Clifton Hill	75.40 acres (30.51 ha)	1973	Clifton Hill rises gently to a summit between the old town centre and West Hill. Built up from the 1820s to the 1860s, the southwest-facing slopes became Brighton's most desirable suburb. Regency and Italianate architecture dominate the area, and many buildings are stuccoed. St Nicholas' Church, Brighton's ancient parish church, is in the area, and is one of hundreds of listed buildings. Other listed churches include St Michael and All Angels, whose interior is considered the best in England, and St Mary Magdalen, but the Gothic Christ Church burnt down in the 1970s and was replaced by International/Modern-style flats.	
North Laine	41.37 acres (16.74 ha)	1977	Based around the east end of Church Street, the oldest road, this tightly packed residential and commercial area was developed in the late 18th and early 19th centuries, helped by Brighton railway station's proximity. A laine was an open field which was divided into strips (furlongs and paul-pieces) separated by pathways; pre-modern Brighton was surrounded by five, including North Laine. The boundaries defined the pattern of development: main roads (such as Church Street) follow the old paths, while side streets run at right-angles along the furlongs and paul-pieces. Total redevelopment was proposed in the 1960s, but the area survived; its "attractive townscape has a distinctive ambience" which makes it "the heart and soul of Brighton".	
Old Hove	34.44 acres (13.94 ha)	1997	Hove Street—the ancient village street, whose manor house was demolished in the 1930s—and its surroundings make up this conservation area. Most housing is of the late 19th century: large, mostly semi-detached or terraced and built of red brick. St Andrew's, the former parish church (rebuilt in a Neo-Norman/Romanesque style by George Basevi in 1834) and Hove Public Library are both listed buildings. The former Connaught Road School, of brown and red brick with Dutch gables and terracotta dressings, adds further interest.	
Old Town	46.77 acres (18.93 ha)	1973	The narrow, winding twittens known as The Lanes were built up in the 16th and 17th centuries as Brighton's fishing industry thrived. Most surviving buildings come from a second period of growth in the 18th and 19th centuries, as small houses were built for newly arrived workers. Many have been converted into small independent shops. Several old pubs, Thomas Lainson's Byzantine Revival Middle Street Synagogue (1875) and the Quaker meeting house (1805) are also in the area.	
Ovingdean	48.58 acres (19.66 ha)	1970	Events in Harrison Ainsworth's novel Ovingdean Grange are fictional, but the building (formerly the manor house) exists in the centre of this downland village, inland from Rottingdean and 2.5 miles (4 km) east of Brighton. St Wulfran's Church, whose churchyard contains a memorial to the family of William Willett, is 12th-century. The adjacent rectory, Ovingdean Hall (a school until 2010) and many flint cottages, mostly of the 18th century, surround the village green and main street.	
Patcham	20.78 acres (8.41 ha)	1970	This ancient downland village was extensively suburbanised in the interwar period, but the core of the village—around All Saints Church—remains intact. One of Sussex's largest villages (and parishes) in the 11th century, the population declined by the 19th century; the conservation area's boundary match those of the village as it was from the 1870s until expansion began (as a result of its inclusion within the Borough of Brighton in 1928). Well-wooded parkland, especially around the Grade II*-listed Patcham Place, and access to the South Downs (affected by construction of the Brighton Bypass in the 1990s) contribute to the area's character. Many buildings are of flint or cobblestone; some have glazed black mathematical tiles.	
Pembroke & Princes, Hove	54.74 acres (22.15 ha)	1989	Most of this area consists of large late Victorian and early Edwardian houses built during Hove's westward expansion. There is also some later housing, mainly of the 1920s and 1930s. Large front gardens, wide curved tree-lined streets, tile-hung façades, painted exterior timbers and hipped roofs with gable ends characterise the area. Non-residential buildings of interest include the Italianate Brooker Hall, now a museum, and Barford Court—an unusual Neo-Georgian/Art Deco nursing home built of handmade purple bricks.	
Portslade Old Village	34.21 acres (13.84 ha)	1974	Portslade sits in a valley west of Hove and has pre-medieval origins; the old village clusters around St Nicolas' Church and the ruined manor house. Pevsner thought that the combination of small flint-walled cottages and a huge Classical/Italianate brewery building of 1881 made it a "bizarre landscape". Extensive parkland, nearby woodland, extensive flint walling and some large 19th-century detached houses contribute to the area's character. Many buildings are listed.	
Preston Park	214.47 acres (86.79 ha)	1970	This area consists of the extensive late-19th-century residential areas north and east of Preston Park: the park itself is part of the neighbouring Preston Village conservation area. Developed in a controlled, architecturally harmonious manner between 1865 and 1885, the long, straight streets of brick villas have features such as timbered gables, decorated bargeboards, canted bay windows and walls combining red brickwork and stucco. Two churches, including the Grade II-listed St Augustine's, contribute to the character of the area.	
Preston Village	80.51 acres (32.58 ha)	1970	A small village with a manor house and church existed at the time of the Domesday survey in 1086, about 1.5 miles (2.4 km) north of Brighton. The manor (rebuilt in 1738) and church survive and form the centrepiece of this conservation area. Small, irregularly laid out flint cottages lie west of the main London Road, while the eclectic late-19th-century houses in Lovers Walk "form an important and attractive group".	
Queen's Park	45.86 acres (18.56 ha)	1977	This large park east of Brighton was laid out in 1823 as Brighton Park. Town Clerk Thomas Attree bought it soon afterwards, rededicated it to Queen Adelaide and built a villa (demolished in the 1970s) on the edge. Some of its associated structures, such as the Pepper Pot tower, survive. Two triumphal archways, the Classical remains of a spa, a brick and stone clock tower and a terracotta-decorated pseudo-medieval drinking fountain are also found in the 15.3-acre (6.2 ha) park.	
Regency Square	79.69 acres (32.25 ha)	1973	Brighton expanded westwards from its historic centre in the early 19th century: developments such as Bedford (the earliest), Russell, Clarence and Regency Squares, Sillwood Place, Western Terrace and Cavendish Place were built for wealthy people attracted to the newly fashionable resort, and hotels (the Grand, Bedford and Norfolk) and entertainment venues followed. Pressure for new development in the 20th century introduced taller buildings such as Sussex Heights and Embassy Court—a Modernist contrast to the predominant stuccoed Regency architecture.	
Rottingdean	41.64 acres (16.85 ha)	1970	This Saxon village, in a valley behind the seafront east of Brighton, grew rich on agriculture and smuggling, and has dozens of large old houses (especially from the 17th and 18th centuries) around a village green with a pond and church. Ancient trees, flint buildings and walls, old farmhouses and associated buildings characterise the village, but heavy traffic has affected its character for many decades.	
Round Hill	29.78 acres (12.05 ha)	1977	This hill rises to 223 feet (68 m) and offers long views in all directions. Its terraced streets and landmark buildings are also visible from many other parts of Brighton. The former Kemp Town branch line cut through the area; its former course is now green space which contributes to the area's character. The steep slopes and parallel roads at several levels make the "cat's-creep"—a long, narrow path in the form of a staircase between buildings—a distinctive feature. Most houses were built between the 1860s and the 1880s.	
Sackville Gardens, Hove	32.40 acres (13.11 ha)	1997	Three long north–south streets, built on allotment land in the late 19th century, and adjacent buildings on the main east–west routes through Hove, make up this small conservation area. The mostly residential area was laid out around the turn of the 20th century: most houses were finished by 1914. The wide roads lead to the seafront and its lawns, offering good views from the architecturally eclectic houses. Many original external features and examples of street furniture also survive.	
Stanmer	316.29 acres (128.00 ha)	1970	This rural downland settlement was called "the only one of Brighton's villages that is really a village" by Pevsner, and its 18th-century listed flint cottages, farm buildings, mansion and church (associated with the Pelham Baronetcy) retain their rural atmosphere despite being 3 miles (4.8 km) from the city centre. War damage was repaired by Brighton Corporation, who bought the estate in 1948. Building materials are mostly flint and weatherboarding.	
The Avenues, Hove	55.78 acres (22.57 ha)	1985	Between Brunswick Town and Cliftonville was open space until the 1870s, when the Stanford family sold it for development. Five wide avenues, numbered First to Fourth with Grand Avenue at the centre, were soon laid out by James Knowles. The expansive houses, in various styles (Queen Anne Revival, Gothic Revival and Italianate, among others), sold more slowly than expected, and the area eventually developed over a 30-year period to 1904—hence its eclectic appearance. Occasional non-residential buildings, such as the Jacobethan Hove Club, enhance the area's character, as do its wide streets and sea views.	
The Drive, Hove	7.86 acres (3.18 ha)	1977	The Grade I-listed All Saints Church, Hove's parish church, is at the centre of this conservation area, which also has large detached villas (mostly converted into flats) designed by William Willett in the 1880s. The church was designed in 1889 by John Loughborough Pearson. The Drive is the northern continuation of Grand Avenue, part of a separate conservation area, and the "Willett Estate" is also considered separately. Gault brickwork is the main building material, and the houses have the same general style while still displaying varied embellishments which reflect "the affluence and the bizarre tastes of the period".	
Tongdean	33.61 acres (13.60 ha)	1989	This high-class Edwardian residential area is centred on Dyke Road Avenue—the old parish boundary between Brighton and Hove. Large detached houses with prominent chimneys and steep roofs are characteristic, and the expansive scale of the area is enhanced by big gardens (mostly walled) and wide pavements. The area was outside Hove and Brighton Boroughs until 1928.	
Valley Gardens, Brighton	92.84 acres (37.57 ha)	1977	The tall, mostly late-18th-century houses of Grand Parade surround the extensive open gardens which run alongside the main road to London along the bed of an ancient river. A popular entertainment venue in Brighton's early years, the area declined so much that the Prince Regent—resident at the Royal Pavilion, at the gardens' south end—donated money for landscaping and enclosure. Full public access was restored in 1896. Bow fronts, mathematical tiles, pitch-coated cobbled façades and short terraces of houses characterise the surrounding buildings, many of which are listed. The area's central location causes traffic problems and pressure for redevelopment.	
West Hill	56.41 acres (22.83 ha)	1977	The steeply sloping hillside developed in two stages: terraced housing for the working- and lower-middle classes was built in the 1840s and 1850s, and detached villas followed two decades later when the parish workhouse moved to Race Hill, freeing up land. Scattered development, such as the bow-fronted houses of North Gardens, already existed as well. Brighton railway station, which stimulated this growth, stands at the foot of the hill. Streets followed ancient field boundaries. Painted and rendered buildings are most common; some of the larger houses are Italianate in style.	
Willett Estate, Hove	68.30 acres (27.64 ha)	1989	William Willett, a builder and inventor, was responsible for the houses around All Saints Church in central Hove. "Willett-built" was considered a mark of quality, and his pale gault-brick houses—detached, semi-detached and terraced—were regarded as solidly built, well-proportioned and attractively decorated with mouldings. When first built in the 1870s and 1880s, though, the homogeneity of the area was criticised. Architects such as H.B. Measures, employed by Willett in the late 1880s, introduced some stylistic variety: red brick and terracotta mansions with florid gables and elaborate decoration.	
Woodland Drive, West Blatchington	27.62 acres (11.18 ha)	1996	This 1930s residential area was laid out by a single developer, William T. Bostock, which has ensured uniformity of design despite his use of various architects and contractors. Clay tiles, half-timbered gables and dark brickwork were used; "the use of natural [building] materials ... produce a fine architectural composition", according to the council's character statement. The roofs are steep and have large chimneys and eaves. A copse has been preserved along the former boundary line between Hove and Brighton.	

== Extensions and changes ==
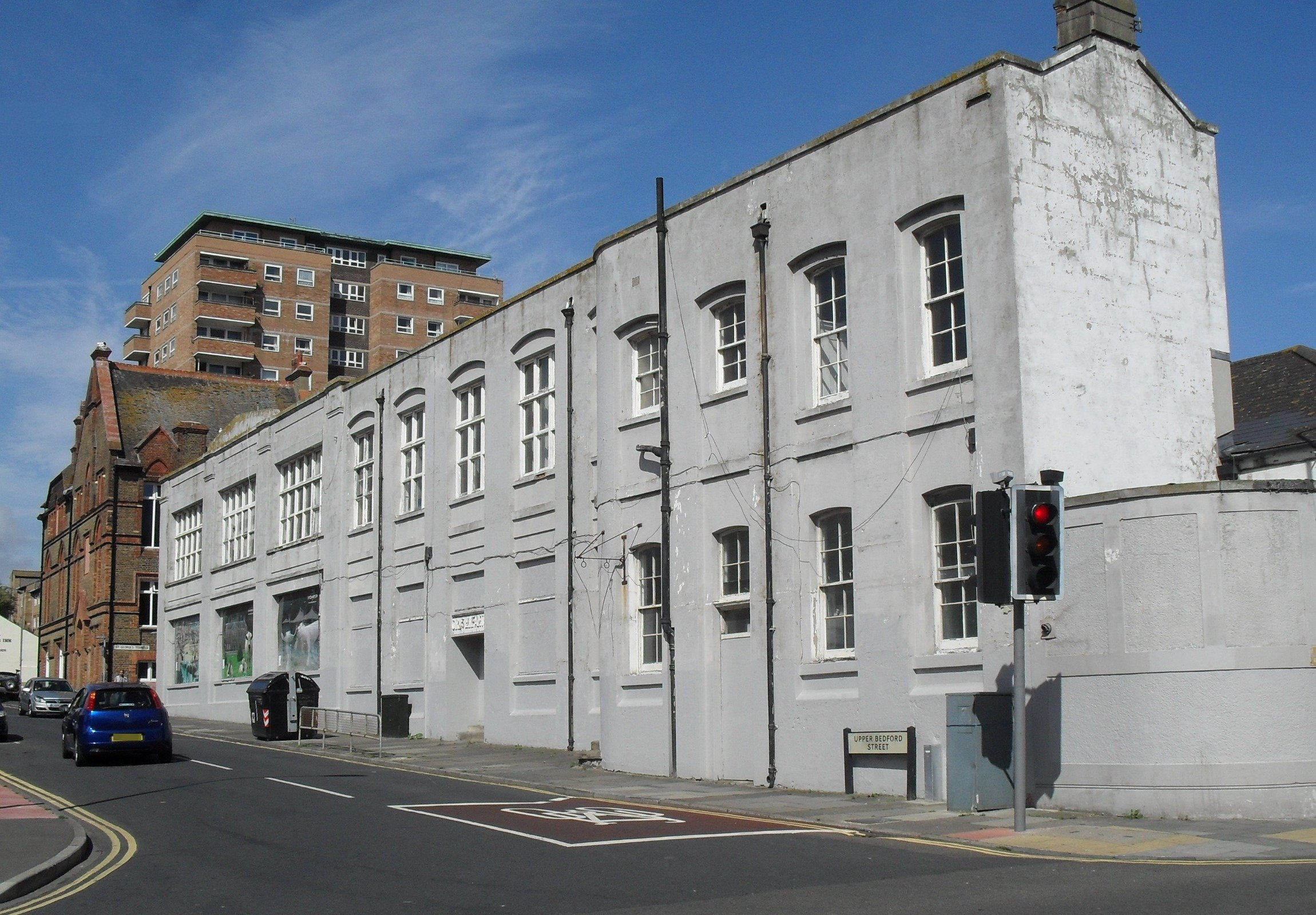
The East Cliff conservation area may be extended to include the Fitzherbert Centre (foreground) and the Pelham Institute.

Section 69 of the Planning (Listed Buildings and Conservation Areas) Act 1990 requires local authorities not only to decide upon and designate conservation areas, but also to review their boundaries periodically. Furthermore, Brighton's Borough Plan (adopted in 1995) states that "consideration will be given to the inclusion of additional areas within existing conservation areas", and that "the opportunity to review the boundaries further will be taken when detailed plans for each conservation area are produced".

Many conservation areas have been extended since they were originally designated. The first round of expansions came in 1977, when Brighton Borough Council changed the boundaries of East Cliff, Kemp Town, the Old Town, Queen's Park, Regency Square and Valley Gardens. East Cliff had a further three extensions: in 1989, 1991 and 2002. The North Laine and neighbouring Valley Gardens areas were each extended in 1989 and 1995; Valley Gardens had already had a boundary change in 1988. More was added to Regency Square's area in 2005, to Patcham in 1992, and to West Hill in 1995. As originally created in 1970, Stanmer conservation area covered only Stanmer House, the village and its environs. An extension in 1988 added much of the surrounding parkland, and more land was added in 2010.

Preston is the only instance of a conservation area being split. Designated under that name in 1970, it was expanded in 1977, 1980 and 1981; in 1988, Brighton Borough Council decided to create two new areas, Preston Village and Preston Park, from this territory. The latter in turn expanded in 1995. A different approach was taken at Montpelier & Clifton Hill: until 2005 this conservation area was named "Clifton", but the council acknowledged that it covered territory in the Montpelier area of the city by introducing its present name in 2005.

Conservation areas are occasionally extended to include single buildings which contribute significantly to an area's character. West Hill, whose residential development immediately followed the opening of Brighton railway station at the bottom of the hill in 1840, changed its boundaries to include it in 1988. The East Cliff conservation area's northern boundary is Eastern Road, but in 2010 consideration was given to extending it north of this at Upper Bedford Street to incorporate Thomas Lainson's Grade II-listed Pelham Institute, a High Victorian Gothic building of the 1870s, and the neighbouring Fitzherbert Centre—a disused early-20th-century school.

== See also ==
- Buildings and architecture of Brighton and Hove

== Map ==
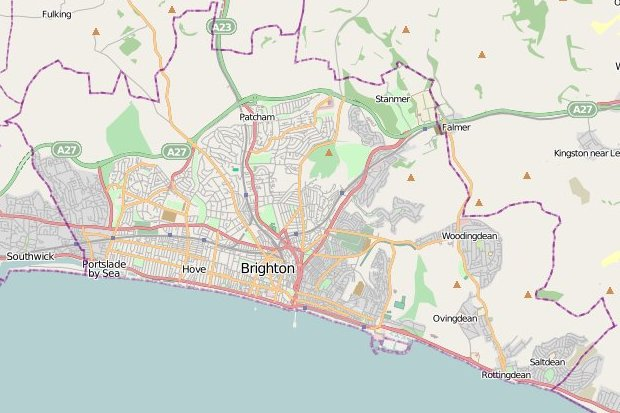
Interactive map of Brighton and Hove. Hover over points to see the conservation area name.
