= John Pelham =

John Pelham may refer to:

- John Pelham (English parliamentarian) (died 1429), MP for Sussex
- John Pelham (bishop) (1811–1894), British Bishop of Norfolk
- John Pelham (soldier) (1838–1863), Confederate artillery officer
- Sir John Pelham, 3rd Baronet (1623–1703), MP for Sussex
- John Pelham, 8th Earl of Chichester (1912–1944), Earl of Chichester
- John Pelham, 9th Earl of Chichester (born 1944), Earl of Chichester
