= Francis Pelham =

Francis Pelham may refer to:

- Francis Pelham, 5th Earl of Chichester, British cleric and nobleman
- Francis Pelham, 7th Earl of Chichester, British nobleman
