= John Pelham, 9th Earl of Chichester =

British peer (born 1944)

The Right Honourable The Earl of Chichester

Member of the House of Lords
- Lord Temporal
- In office 14 April 1965 – 11 November 1999
- Preceded by: The 8th Earl of Chichester
- Succeeded by: Seat abolished (Note: Pursuant to the House of Lords Act 1999.)

Personal details
- Born: John Nicholas Pelham; 14 April 1944 (age 81)
- Party: Conservative

John Nicholas Pelham, 9th Earl of Chichester (born 14 April 1944), is a British nobleman.

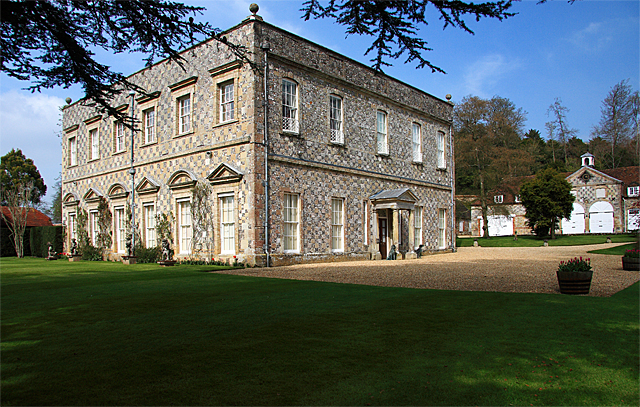
Little Durnford Manor, Wiltshire

Chichester was born posthumously on 14 April 1944 to Ursula, Countess of Chichester; his father, John Pelham, 8th Earl of Chichester, had been killed in a road accident in February, while on active service with the Scots Guards, so he acceded to the earldom at birth. The Countess married Ralph Gunning Henderson in 1957, but they were divorced in 1971.

Chichester was educated at Stanbridge Earls School and in business as a farmer. In 1965, getting to the age of 21, he was able to take his seat in the House of Lords.

In 1975, Chichester married June Marijke Hall (née Wells), the daughter of Group Captain Edward Wells. They have one daughter:

- Lady Eliza Catherine Pelham (born 1983)

They live at Little Durnford Manor, in Wiltshire.

== Succession ==
The title passes solely in the male line, so his heir presumptive is his second cousin once removed, Duncan James Bergengren Pelham (born 1987), who is the great grandson of Henry George Godolphin Pelham, second son of the fifth Earl.

== Coat of arms ==
Coat of arms of John Pelham, 9th Earl of Chichester
Coronet A coronet of an Earl Crest A peacock in pride argent. Escutcheon Quarterly: 1st and 4th azure, three pelicans vulning themselves argent; 2nd and 3rd gules, two pieces of belts with buckles, erect in pale, the buckles upwards argent. Supporters Dexter, a horse of a mouse dun colour; Sinister, a bear proper, each collared with a belt, buckle and pendant or. Motto Vincit amor patriae (The love of my country will prevail). Badge The buckle of a belt or.

== Notes ==
Peerage of the United Kingdom
Preceded by John Pelham	Earl of Chichester; 1944–present Member of the House of Lords (1965–1999)	Incumbent; Heir presumptive: Duncan Pelham
