= Anthony Pelham =

English cricketer

Personal information
- Full name: Anthony George Pelham
- Born: 7 September 1911; Minehead, Somerset, England
- Died: 10 March 1969 (aged 57); Dorking, Surrey, England
- Batting: Right-handed
- Bowling: Right-arm medium-fast
- Role: Bowler
- Relatives: Grandfather, Francis

Domestic team information
- Years: Team
- 1930–1931: Sussex
- 1931–1934: Cambridge University
- 1933: Somerset
- First-class debut: 27 August 1930 Sussex v Yorkshire
- Last First-class: 11 July 1934 Cambridge University v Oxford University

Career statistics
| Competition | First-class |
|---|---|
| Matches | 35 |
| Runs scored | 339 |
| Batting average | 10.93 |
| 100s/50s | –/– |
| Top score | 40* |
| Balls bowled | 5975 |
| Wickets | 84 |
| Bowling average | 31.07 |
| 5 wickets in innings | 2 |
| 10 wickets in match | – |
| Best bowling | 5/37 |
| Catches/stumpings | 19/– |
- Source: CricketArchive, 11 June 2011

Anthony George Pelham (4 September 1911 – 10 March 1969) played first-class cricket for Sussex, Cambridge University and Somerset between 1930 and 1934. He was born at Minehead, Somerset and died at Dorking, Surrey.

The grandson of Francis Pelham, 5th Earl of Chichester, Pelham was educated at Eton College where his right-arm medium-pace bowling was decisive in the 1930 Eton v Harrow cricket match: he took seven Harrow wickets for 21 runs in 21 overs in the first innings, and four for 23 in 21 overs and a ball in the second. Later that same season, he made his first-class cricket debut as a lower-order batsman and bowler for Sussex in the match against Yorkshire at Hove; his first and only wicket in the game was that of Herbert Sutcliffe, whom he caught and bowled, though Sutcliffe had scored 173 by the time that happened.

Pelham was at Cambridge University for four years from the autumn of 1930, but for most of his student time there he was an irregular cricketer, seldom picked for the university side. In 1931, he played against the university for Sussex, and appeared in only one match for the university side, featuring in eight other Sussex matches across the season. The following year, 1932, he played only for the university team, and took five Essex wickets for 37 runs, the best bowling performance of his first-class career, in a match in May. But he was unable to retain his place in the team and did not win a Blue. In 1933, he was given only two matches by Cambridge, and after the end of the university season he played two matches for Somerset, for whom he was qualified by his birthplace; in none of these games did he make much impact.

In 1934, after three seasons in which the Cambridge bowling attack had been dominated by Kenneth Farnes, there were bowling vacancies in the Cambridge side and Pelham was selected more often than ever before. Wisden Cricketers' Almanack wrote of him: "After waiting three years he obtained better control over length and, given the opportunity to open the attack with the new ball, he bowled with much more life than formerly." His best performance of the season came in the home match against Glamorgan, when he followed a first-innings three for 94 with five for 56 in the second innings, taking five of the last six wickets for one run in what Wisden termed "an irresistible spell". Finally awarded a Blue in the University Match, he opened the second innings bowling by taking two Oxford wickets for just six runs in his first nine overs, but was then not bowled again until the 119th over of the innings, when he finished the Oxford batting off with his second ball. The decision not to bowl Pelham while more than 100 overs were taken by other bowlers was criticised in The Times: "He may be apt to be an expensive bowler the second time on, but the runs could not matter vastly; the wickets did," its report said. This was his last first-class match.

== After cricket ==
Pelham married in 1938 and had two daughters and a son. His wife was a daughter of the Swedish industrialist Axel Bergengren. At the time of his death in 1969, he was living in Dorking, Surrey.
