= Stanmer Church =

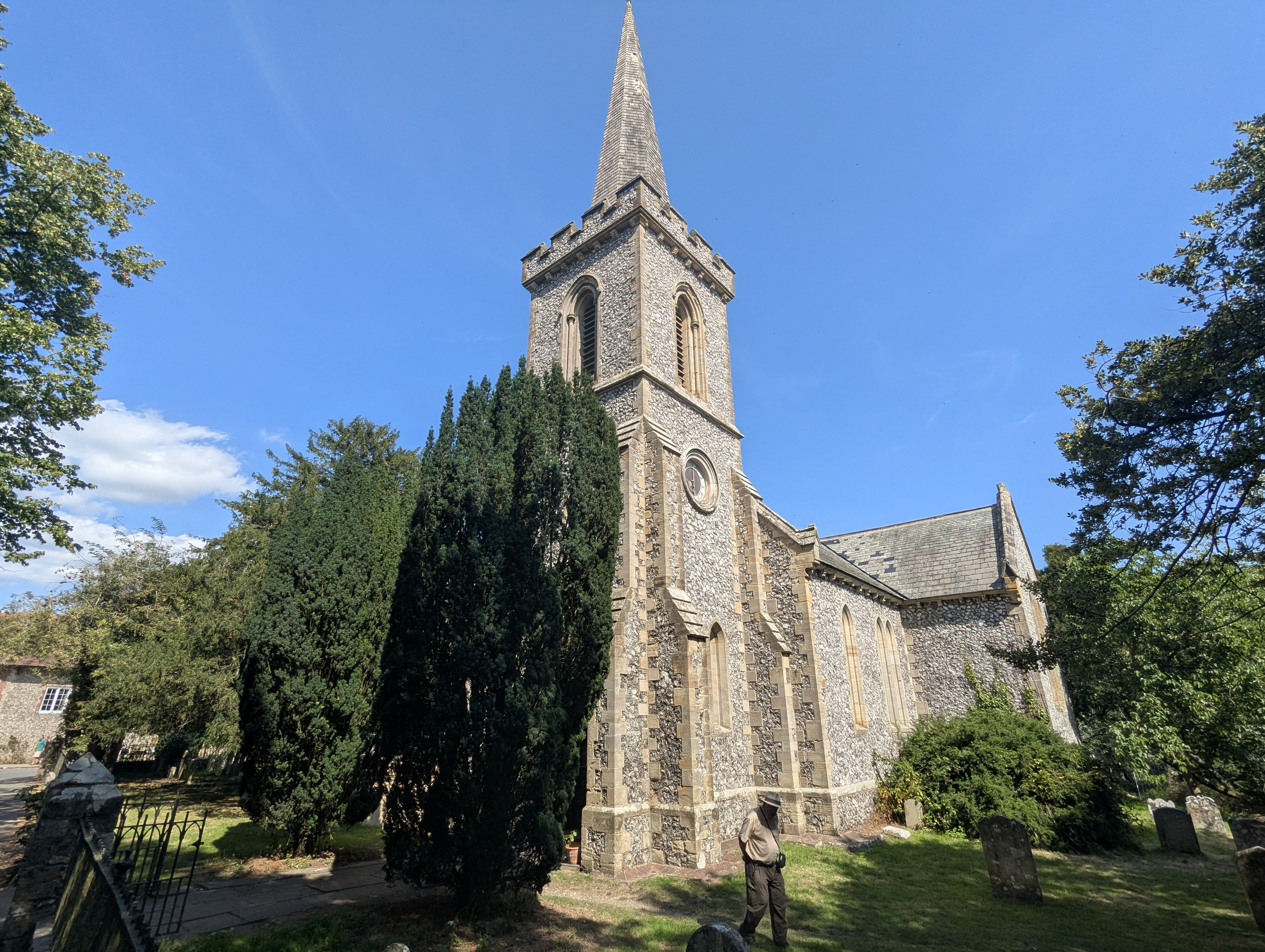
- The church from the south, facing Stanmer Park
- Stanmer Church
- 50°52′13″N 0°6′7″W
- Denomination: Church of England

History
- Status: Church
- Dedication: None

Architecture
- Functional status: Redundant
- Heritage designation: Grade II listed
- Designated: 2 November 1954
- Closed: 31 March 2008

Administration
- Province: Canterbury
- Diocese: Chichester
- Archdeaconry: Brighton and Lewes
- Deanery: Rural Deanery of Brighton
- Parish: Stanmer with Falmer

Clergy
- Vicar: The Rev'd Canon Andrew N. Robinson AKC

Stanmer Church is a former Anglican church in Stanmer village, on the northeastern edge of the English city of Brighton and Hove. The ancient village stands within Stanmer Park, the former private estate of the Earl of Chichester, which the Brighton Corporation (the predecessor of the present city council) acquired for the benefit of Brighton's citizens after the Second World War. The church and a stately home, Stanmer House, stand outside the village but within the park's boundaries. The church, which was declared redundant in 2008, has been listed at Grade II by English Heritage for its architectural and historical importance.

== History ==
Stanmer's recorded history goes back to 765, when the village and its lands were given to the South Malling monastery in nearby Lewes by the King of Sussex. The village belonged to the Church for several centuries thereafter, being part of the Episcopal See of Canterbury by the time of the Domesday Book. Ownership transferred from the Archbishop of Canterbury to King Henry VIII during the Dissolution of the Monasteries.

A church was built in the Middle Ages; records of it go back to 1232. It stood on open land outside the village. It had no known dedication, little is known about the building, and the only remnants from the era are some yew trees in the churchyard and several memorial tablets and tombstones.

The church and its associated land were returned to the Archbishop of Canterbury in 1555, not long after the Dissolution. The Pelham family began a long association with the village and church in the 16th century; they took ownership of the whole estate and its lands in the early 18th century. The Grade I-listed Stanmer House was built for them in 1722, and the family became an earldom in 1801 when Thomas Pelham had the title Earl of Chichester bestowed upon him. The Earls demolished the houses and buildings of the old village and created an "estate village" north-east of the church. In 1838, the third Earl of Chichester, Henry Thomas Pelham, decided to demolish the old church and build a new one on the same site. The architect was probably Ralph Joanes (Note: There is some doubt about the architect, as with the original church there is no dedication. The architect was either Joseph Butler or Ralph Joanes. A plan of the church and of the graveyard still survives and is signed by Butler. Joanes was clerk of works for the site, and when he signed the account off he described himself as an architect.) of Lansdowne Place, Lewes. The building is always referred to simply as "Stanmer Church".

The Brighton Corporation bought the Stanmer Estate in 1947 as part of its policy of land acquisition, and in 1952 the boundary of the Borough of Brighton was extended to incorporate the parish.

The Diocese of Chichester declared the church redundant from 29 December 2008, meaning it was no longer open for regular public worship. Stanmer Preservation Society maintains the building and opens it every Sunday. It also opens for specials events such as guest speakers and concerts. In the early 1990s, the first episode of Mr. Bean was filmed here.

== Architecture ==
Stanmer Church is in the Early English style. It has a simple cruciform layout, with a chancel, nave, north and south transepts and a tower at the west end topped with a thin shingled spire. An entrance porch is incorporated within the ground floor of the tower. A peal of bells cast in 1791 are housed within the tower. Knapped flintwork was used to build the exterior, although the structural quoins are of stone. The church has a slate roof.

Inside, stone walls and carved wooden fittings predominate. Jude Jones, the designated carpenter and estate foreman of the Earls of Chichester and also an active member of the church in the 19th century, designed and constructed all the wooden fixtures. The chancel roof is panelled and has moulded rib vaults and intricately decorated ceiling bosses. The nave roof of four bays also has trefoil-headed panelling.

A gallery at the west end houses an organ built in 1839. A plastered stone reredos, also with trefoil-headed panels, dates from the mid-19th century. It is flanked by panels depicting the Ten Commandments, designed by Jones. He was also responsible for the pulpit, altar and lectern. His son, Francis Jude Jones, succeeded him in his roles in the Stanmer Estate and was also a capable carpenter, designing a new set of entrance doors as a memorial to the 7th Earl of Chichester.

Five memorial tablets and stones were moved from the old church. The oldest non-Pelham memorial dates from 1626, and commemorates Deborah Goffe, the mother of William Goffe (one of the judges at the trial of King Charles I). Another commemorates Sir John Pelham, his wife and their son, all of whom died in the 16th century. They are shown kneeling below the family coat of arms. Other memorials to the Pelhams are housed in the south transept.

== Churchyard ==
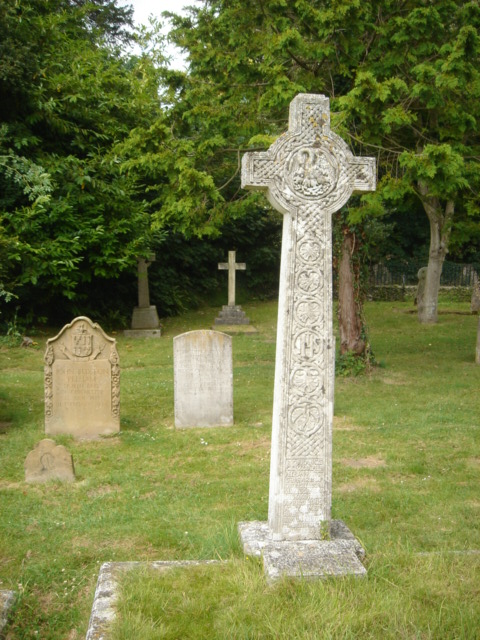
Graves of several Earls of Chichester in the churchyard

The churchyard contains an unusual wellhouse, rebuilt at the same time as the church, with a rare vertically mounted donkey-wheel dating from the 18th century or possibly earlier. Donkey-wheels are a smaller version of the more common horse-gin. The animal walks a circular path around the well, turns a wheel attached to a pump, and thereby draws water from the ground. Before mechanical power was available, horse or donkey power was sometimes used in areas where aquifers lay a long way below the surface; this was the case on the chalky South Downs, and both types of wheel were common in Sussex in the 18th century. By 1968, however, only three donkey-wheels and five horse-gins survived. The wellhouse was damaged by a falling tree in 2007 but was repaired by Stanmer Preservation Society.

Several members of the Pelham family are buried in the churchyard, mostly on the south side of the church. The churchyard's sole CWGC registered war grave is to the 8th Earl of Chichester, Captain Scots Guards, who was killed in a road accident in 1944.

== The church today ==
Stanmer Church was listed at Grade II on 2 November 1954. The wellhouse has a separate listing, also at Grade II; this was granted on the same date.

Stanmer Church remains within the joint parish of Stanmer and Falmer. The church at Falmer is dedicated to St Laurence, but it lies across the border in the adjoining local government district of Lewes rather than in the city of Brighton and Hove. The parish covers a mostly rural area, including Stanmer and Falmer villages, the main campuses of the Universities of Sussex and Brighton, and the Falmer–Woodingdean road (B2123) to the edge of the Woodingdean estate. It also extends some way on to the southern face of the South Downs. The parish priest had responsibility for the chaplaincies of the two universities. Until its closure, there was a weekly service on Sunday evenings, and prayer sessions twice a month. Although no longer used for religious ceremonies, it is still opened by Stanmer Preservation Society every Sunday.

== See also ==
- Grade II listed buildings in Brighton and Hove: S
- List of places of worship in Brighton and Hove

== Bibliography ==
- Berry, Sue (2011). Barber, Luke (ed.). "The impact of the Georgians, Victorians and Edwardians on early parish churches: City of Brighton and Hove c. 1680-1914)". Sussex Archaeological Collections. 149. Lewes: Sussex Archaeological Society: 199–220. doi:10.5284/1086632. ISSN 0143-8204.
- Dale, Antony (1989). Brighton Churches. London: Routledge. ISBN 0-415-00863-8.
- Fines, Ken (2002). A History of Brighton & Hove. Chichester: Phillimore & Co. ISBN 1-86077-231-5.
