= Henry Pelham, 3rd Earl of Chichester =

British peer & soldier (1804-1886)

The Right Honourable The Earl of Chichester DL
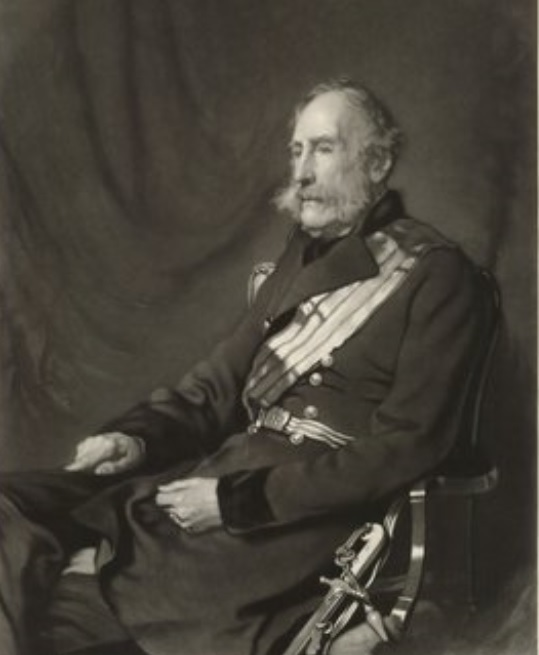
- The 3rd Earl of Chichester

Personal details
- Born: 25 August 1804 Stratton Street, Piccadilly, London
- Died: 15 March 1886 (aged 81) Stanmer Park, East Sussex, England
- Spouse(s): Lady Mary Brudenell (m. 1828, died 1867)
- Children: Harriet Bligh, Countess of Darnley; Lady Susan Smith; Lady Isabella Whitbread; Walter Pelham, 4th Earl of Chichester; Francis Pelham, 5th Earl of Chichester; Thomas Pelham; Arthur Pelham
- Parents: Thomas Pelham, 2nd Earl of Chichester (father); Lady Mary Osborne (mother)
- Relatives: Robert Brudenell, 6th Earl of Cardigan (father-in-law); John Bligh, 6th Earl of Darnley (son-in-law); Abel Smith (son-in-law); Samuel Whitbread (son-in-law); Walter Pelham, 4th Earl of Chichester (son); Francis Pelham, 5th Earl of Chichester (son)
- Education: Westminster School
- Alma mater: Trinity College, Cambridge
- Military career
- Allegiance: United Kingdom
- Branch: British Army
- Service years: 1824–1844
- Rank: Major
- Units: 6th (Inniskilling) Dragoons; Royal Horse Guards

Henry Thomas Pelham, 3rd Earl of Chichester DL (25 August 1804 – 15 March 1886), styled Lord Pelham until 1826, was an English peer.

== Background and education ==
Pelham was born on Stratton Street, Piccadilly, the son of Thomas Pelham, 2nd Earl of Chichester and Lady Mary Henrietta Juliana Osborne. He was educated at Westminster School and Trinity College, Cambridge.

== Military career ==
Pelham was commissioned a cornet in the 6th (Inniskilling) Dragoons on 24 June 1824, transferring to the Royal Horse Guards on 14 October of that year. He succeeded his father as Earl of Chichester in 1826. He became a Deputy Lieutenant of Sussex on 5 April 1827, and was promoted lieutenant on 28 April, becoming an unattached captain on 3 April 1828. Chichester was promoted to major in 1841 and retired from the army in 1844.

== Public life ==
Lord Chichester served as an Ecclesiastical Commissioner from 1841 to 1886, as President of the Royal Agricultural Society in 1849 and as Lord Lieutenant of Sussex from 1860 to 1886. He also demolished and rebuilt Stanmer Church.

== Family ==
Lord Chichester married Lady Mary Brudenell, daughter of Robert Brudenell, 6th Earl of Cardigan, at St. Mary's Church, Cadogan Street, London, on 18 August 1828. They had seven children:

- Lady Harriet Mary Pelham (1829 – 4 September 1905), married John Bligh, 6th Earl of Darnley. They were the parents of Edward Bligh, 7th Earl of Darnley and Ivo Bligh, 8th Earl of Darnley.
- Lady Susan Emma Pelham (1831–1875), married Abel Smith. They were the parents of Abel Henry Smith.
- Lady Isabella Charlotte Pelham (1836 – 11 December 1916), married Samuel Whitbread. They had four children, including a son also called Samuel.
- Walter John Pelham, 4th Earl of Chichester (1838–1902).
- Rev. Francis Godolphin Pelham, 5th Earl of Chichester (1844–1905).
- Hon. Thomas Henry William Pelham (21 December 1847 – 23 December 1916), who was involved in the early boys' clubs movement.
- Hon. Arthur Lowther Pelham (28 December 1850 – 12 February 1929).

Lord Chichester died at the family estate of Stanmer Park and was succeeded by his eldest son Walter.

== Coat of arms ==
Coat of arms of Henry Pelham, 3rd Earl of Chichester
Coronet A coronet of an Earl Crest A peacock in pride argent. Escutcheon Quarterly: 1st and 4th azure, three pelicans vulning themselves argent; 2nd and 3rd gules, two pieces of belts with buckles, erect in pale, the buckles upwards argent. Supporters Dexter, a horse of a mouse dun colour; Sinister, a bear proper, each collared with a belt, buckle and pendant or. Motto Vincit amor patriae (The love of my country will prevail). Badge The buckle of a belt or.

Church of England titles
Preceded by New post	First Church Estates Commissioner; 1850–1878	Succeeded by The Earl Stanhope
Honorary titles
Preceded by The Duke of Richmond	Lord Lieutenant of Sussex; 1860–1886	Succeeded by The Viscount Hampden
Peerage of the United Kingdom
Preceded by Thomas Pelham	Earl of Chichester; 1826–1886	Succeeded by Walter Pelham
