= Jocelyn Pelham, 6th Earl of Chichester =

Jocelyn Brudenell Pelham, 6th Earl of Chichester, OBE (21 May 1871 – 14 November 1926) was a British nobleman.

The elder son of Francis Pelham, 5th Earl of Chichester, and Alice, the daughter of 1st Baron Wolverton, he was educated at Eton. In 1898 he married Ruth Buxton with whom he had four children: Lady Elizabeth, Francis, Lady Prudence, who married Guy Branch, and John. He was a Deputy Lieutenant of Sussex; a Public Works Loan Commissioner and a Brevet Lieutenant-Colonel of the Royal Sussex Regiment.

He was awarded the O.B.E. in 1918.

Coat of arms of Jocelyn Pelham, 6th Earl of Chichester
Coronet A coronet of an Earl Crest A peacock in pride argent. Escutcheon Quarterly: 1st and 4th azure, three pelicans vulning themselves argent; 2nd and 3rd gules, two pieces of belts with buckles, erect in pale, the buckles upwards argent. Supporters Dexter, a horse of a mouse dun colour; Sinister, a bear proper, each collared with a belt, buckle and pendant or. Motto Vincit amor patriae (The love of my country will prevail). Badge The buckle of a belt or.

Peerage of the United Kingdom
Preceded by Francis Pelham	Earl of Chichester; 1905–1926	Succeeded by Francis Pelham
