= Stanmer =

Village near Brighton, England

Coordinates: 50.8694°N 0.1018°W

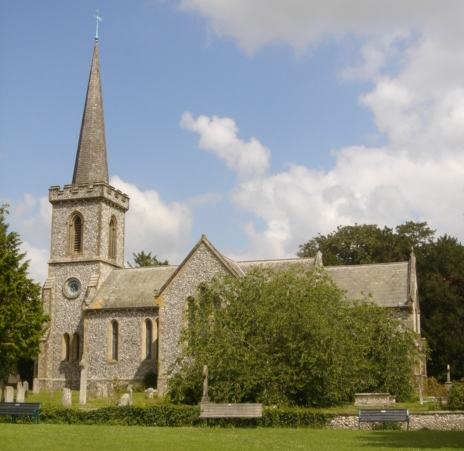
- Stanmer Church

- Location within East Sussex
- OS grid reference: TQ335095
- Unitary authority: Brighton and Hove
- Ceremonial county: East Sussex
- Region: South East
- Country: England
- Sovereign state: United Kingdom
- Post town: BRIGHTON
- Postcode district: BN1
- Dialling code: 01273
- Police: Sussex
- Fire: East Sussex
- Ambulance: South East Coast
- UK Parliament: Brighton, Pavilion

Stanmer is a village on the northern edge of the city of Brighton and Hove, in the ceremonial county of East Sussex, England. It was formerly a civil parish until 1952 when it was split between Brighton and Falmer.

== History ==
The etymological root of the name is "Stony Mere", Old English for "stone pond", referring to the sarsen stones around Stanmer village pond. The stones are not in their original situation, but have been gathered from the Downs and landscaped into the park's appearance. There have been rather inconclusive archaeological excavations at Pudding Bag Wood and Rocky Clump in the north of the park, and in Stanmer Great Wood, producing evidence of occupation from Neolithic times onwards.

The village is first recorded in about 765 A.D. when (if the document is authentic) land there was granted by king Ealdwulf of Sussex to Hunlaf in order that he might found a college of secular canons at South Malling near Lewes. In the Middle Ages it had the curious distinction of being an exclave (forming a detached part) of the Rape of Pevensey, which is otherwise east of the Ouse. The Domesday Book shows that in 1066 and 1086, the tenant-in-chief remained the Archbishop of Canterbury while the local lordship had been transferred from the canons of 1066 to the archbishop by 1086.

== Landmarks ==
It was for long a closed village ruled by the resident lords of Stanmer, with a population static at just over 100. From the eighteenth century onwards the lords were the Pelham family who received the title Earl of Chichester in 1801 in addition to the Baron Pelham of Stanmer they had had since from 1762. They lived in the mansion called Stanmer House, built in its present Palladian form in 1722, a Grade I listed building. It stands at the centre of Stanmer Park, landscaped by Humphry Repton, which was awarded Grade II "park of special historic interest" status by English Heritage in 1983. In the eastern portion of the park was built, from 1960 onwards, the University of Sussex.

Stanmer Church, with a narrow spire unusual in Sussex downland, is adjacent to the pond and to Stanmer House. Its historic dedication is unknown. It was built in 1838 on the site of a 14th-century predecessor destroyed by fire.

Stanmer has a working farm at its centre. Near the church is an unusual survival, a donkey wheel, i.e. a treadmill formerly operated by a donkey. There are 18th-century lodge-houses at the upper and lower ends of the park. The village also possesses former almshouses in the Chichester name, built around 1900.

The Stanmer Preservation Society has been responsible, over the years, for the maintenance and upkeep of many of the agricultural artifacts which were discovered and excavated in the Stanmer Park locality. Included in with some of these include those from Rocky Clump, first discovered by Walter Gorton and Charlie Yeates in the 1950s. It also now maintains the church, Rural Museum and Donkey Wheel.

== Stanmer and Brighton ==
In 1951 the civil parish had a population of 1097. On 1 April 1952 the parish was abolished and merged with Brighton and Falmer. The park is now a major public space for the residents of the city of Brighton and Hove, and regularly hosts such events as kite-flying and combined driving (horse-driving trials). Stanmer House was used as offices by the university in the 1960s and 70s, but was recently derelict and in need of restoration. It is now partly open to the public again and is licensed as a wedding venue.

== Sources ==
- Berry, Sue (2005). "Stanmer House and Park, East Sussex: the evolution of a small downland country house and its setting c.1710-1805". Sussex Archaeological Collections. 143: 239–55. doi:10.5284/1086742.
- Brighton Archaeological Society (2000) Field Unit Archive 2000, http://www.brightonarch.org.uk/13_1.htm (scroll down).
- Carder, Tim (1990) Encyclopaedia of Brighton. Lewes: East Sussex County Libraries.
- Funnell, John (2000) Excavations at Rocky Clump, Stanmer. Flint 43.
- Gorton, W.C.L. & Yeates, C.W. (1988) Rocky Clump, Stanmer: a forgotten shrine? Stanmer Preservation Society.
- Warne, Heather (1989). "Stanmer: a restructured settlement". Sussex Archaeological Collections. 127: 189–210. doi:10.5284/1086585.
- Yeates, C.W. and others (?1980s) Stanmer, 2nd edn. [Ditchling]: Stanmer Preservation Society.
- Yeates, C.W. (1986) Hovel in the wood. Privately published. [Partly reminiscence, partly archaeology.]

An important documentary source, the estate accounts from 1769 to 1950, is housed in East Sussex Record Office, Lewes.
