= John Pelham, 8th Earl of Chichester =

British nobleman and diplomat

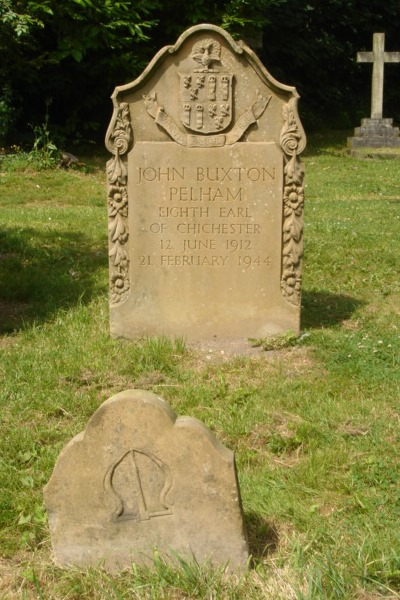
John Buxton Pelham, 8th Earl of Chichester's grave at Stanmer Church

Captain John Buxton Pelham, 8th Earl of Chichester (12 June 1912 – 21 February 1944), styled The Honourable John Pelham until 1926, was a British diplomat.

Pelham was the younger son of Jocelyn Pelham, 6th Earl of Chichester, and Ruth Buxton, daughter of Francis Buxton. He was educated at Eton College and Trinity College, Oxford.

He succeeded in the earldom at age fourteen in 1926 on the early death of his elder brother. A diplomat in the 1930s, he served as Honorary Attaché to Warsaw in 1931 and Washington in 1933, as Honorary Private Secretary to British High Commissioner to Canada from December 1933 to July 1934, and as 3rd Secretary and Press Attaché at The Hague in 1939. He fought in the Second World War, gaining the rank of Captain in the Scots Guards. He died on 21 February 1944 at age 31, killed in a road accident, while on active service. He was buried in the churchyard of Stanmer Church, Sussex.

Lord Chichester married Ursula von Pannwitz, daughter of Walter de Pannwitz, in 1940. They had one daughter and a son, John Pelham, 9th Earl of Chichester, who was born after his father's death in April 1944. The Countess of Chichester married as her second husband Ralph Gunning Henderson, in 1957. They were divorced in 1971. Lady Chichester died in 1989.

Coat of arms of John Pelham, 8th Earl of Chichester
| Coronet A coronet of an Earl Crest A peacock in pride argent. Escutcheon Quarterly: 1st and 4th azure, three pelicans vulning themselves argent; 2nd and 3rd gules, two pieces of belts with buckles, erect in pale, the buckles upwards argent. Supporters Dexter, a horse of a mouse dun colour; Sinister, a bear proper, each collared with a belt, buckle and pendant or. Motto Vincit amor patriae (The love of my country will prevail). Badge The buckle of a belt or. |

Peerage of the United Kingdom
| Preceded by Francis Pelham | Earl of Chichester; 1926–1944 | Succeeded by John Pelham |
