= Francis Pelham, 7th Earl of Chichester =

British nobleman (1905–1926)

Francis Godolphin Henry Pelham, 7th Earl of Chichester (23 March 1905 – 22 November 1926) was a British nobleman, styled Lord Pelham from April 1905 to 1926. He held one of the shortest tenures of an earldom on record.

He was educated at Eton College and Trinity College, Oxford, and died of pneumonia, outliving his father, the 6th earl, by only 9 days. He was succeeded by his younger brother John, then 14 years old.

Coat of arms of Francis Pelham, 7th Earl of Chichester
Coronet A coronet of an Earl Crest A peacock in pride argent. Escutcheon Quarterly: 1st and 4th azure, three pelicans vulning themselves argent; 2nd and 3rd gules, two pieces of belts with buckles, erect in pale, the buckles upwards argent. Supporters Dexter, a horse of a mouse dun colour; Sinister, a bear proper, each collared with a belt, buckle and pendant or. Motto Vincit amor patriae (The love of my country will prevail). Badge The buckle of a belt or.

Peerage of the United Kingdom
Preceded by Jocelyn Pelham	Earl of Chichester; 1926	Succeeded by John Pelham
