= Stanmer Park =

Park northeast of Brighton and Hove, UK

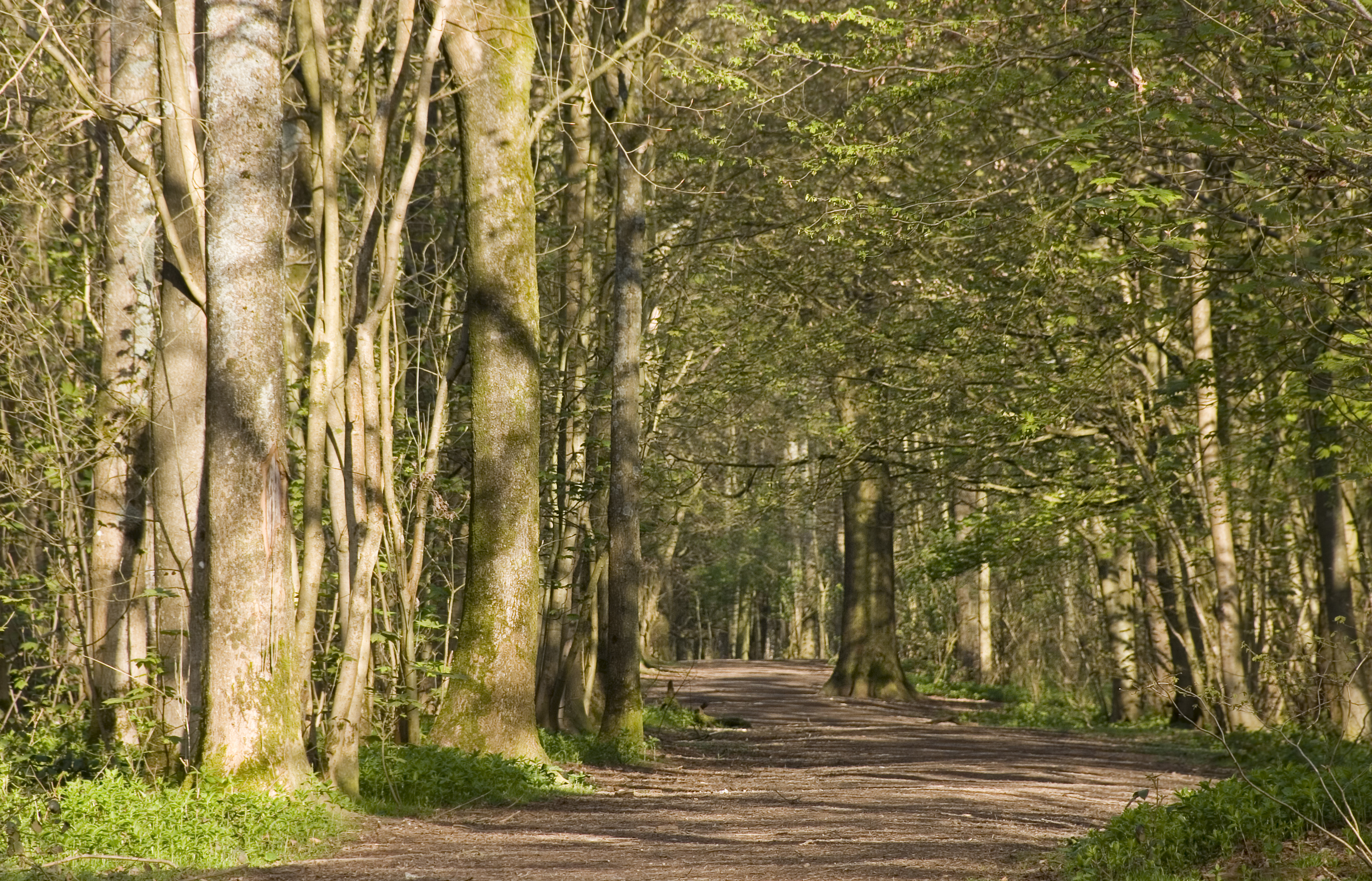
- Interactive map of Stanmer Park
- Type: Local Nature Reserve
- Location: Brighton, East Sussex
- OS grid: TQ 335 093
- Coordinates: 50°52′04″N 0°06′11″W
- Area: 187.9 hectares (464 acres)
- Manager: Brighton and Hove City Council

National Register of Historic Parks and Gardens
- Official name: Stanmer Park
- Type: Grade II
- Designated: 20 January 2000
- Reference no.: 1001447

Stanmer Park is a large public park within the Brighton and Hove city boundary. It is a Local Nature Reserve and English Heritage, under the National Heritage Act 1983, has registered the park on the Register of Parks and Gardens of Special Historic Interest in England at Grade II level.

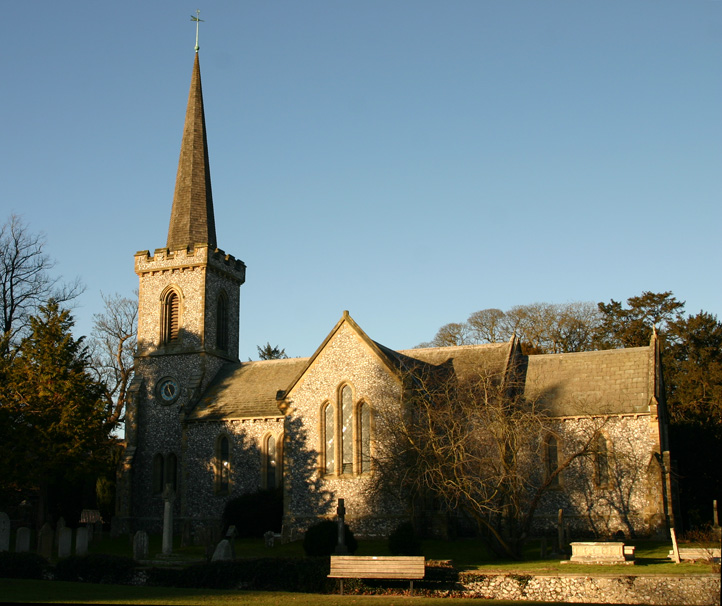
Stanmer Church, 2006

The eighteenth century park contains the Grade I listed Stanmer House and also 25 Grade II listed buildings and structures. These form the village of Stanmer and Stanmer Church within the park, which would once have been the estate of the house. All were private until bought by Brighton's Council in 1947. There is a café, Stanmer Tea Rooms, in the village. Stanmer is surrounded by Sussex University to the east, Wild Park and Coldean to the southwest, more woodland with clay soils to the north west and the farmed South Downs. It is nestled in the South Downs National Park. Immediately to the south of the park runs the major A27 road.

== History ==
Stanmer House was built for the Pelham family in 1722 around an earlier building. A mistress of King George IV later lived there. It was used as the first administrative centre of the 1961 University of Sussex, during the construction of its campus over a part of the park. A walk of elm trees was preserved within the campus design, by architect Sir Basil Spence. The house reopened in June 2006 after extensive restoration but there have been difficulties in bringing it into successful use.

The church, adjacent to the village pond, was built in 1838 on the site of a 14th-century building. The church is now maintained by the Stanmer Preservation Society, which also runs the Donkey Wheel.

In 2021 the park underwent a major restoration project funded through the National Lottery, the City Council, Plumpton College and the South Downs National Park Authority. The project improved the infrastructure, facilities and accessibility of the park, and provided a new walled public garden known as "One Garden Brighton".
