= Earl of Chichester =

Peerage

Earldom of Chichester
- Blazon: Arms: Quarterly, 1st and 4th, Azure, three Pelicans Argent, vulning themselves proper, 2nd and 3rd, Gules, two broken Belts palewise, the buckles upwards Argent.; Crest: A Peacock in pride Argent.; Supporters: Dexter: A Horse of a mouse colour, collared with a Belt Argent, buckle and pendent Or. Sinister: A Bear proper, collared with a Belt Argent, buckle and pendant Or.
- Creation date: 23 June 1801
- Creation: Third
- Created by: George III
- Peerage: Peerage of the United Kingdom
- First holder: Thomas Pelham, 2nd Baron Pelham of Stanmer
- Present holder: John Pelham, 9th Earl of Chichester
- Heir presumptive: Richard Anthony Henry Pelham
- Remainder to: Heirs male of the first earl's body lawfully begotten
- Subsidiary titles: Baron Pelham; Baronet 'of Laughton'
- Seat: Little Durnford Manor
- Former seat: Stanmer House
- Motto: VINCIT AMOR PATRIÆ (The love of my country prevails)
- The shield in the arms of the Earl of Chichester is the same as that of the Earl of Yarborough

Earl of Chichester is a title that has been created three times, twice in the Peerage of England and once in the Peerage of the United Kingdom. The current title was created in the Peerage of the United Kingdom in 1801 for Thomas Pelham, 2nd Baron Pelham of Stanmer.

== Medieval earls of other places ==
Modern sources occasionally refer to medieval earls of Chichester in regard to the d'Aubignys, Earls of Arundel (created 1143) and/or the (de) Montgomeries, Earls of Shrewsbury (created 1074), previously seized of the fiefdom of and castle of Arundel. As earldoms in that era were less defined – an earl could be referred to by various place names, such as the name of the place where he officiated – reference to those holders as such is deprecated.

== First creation (1644) ==
The first formal creation of the earldom was in the Peerage of England in 1644, when Francis Leigh, 1st Baron Dunsmore was made Earl of Chichester (in the County of Sussex), with remainder to his son-in-law Thomas Wriothesley, 4th Earl of Southampton (the husband of his daughter Elizabeth). He had already been made a baronet, of Newnham, Warwickshire, in 1618 (in the Baronetage of England), with remainder to the heirs male of his body, and Baron Dunsmore of Dunsmore, Warwickshire, in 1628 (in the Peerage of England), with special remainder to his stepson John Anderson (the son of his second wife Hon. Audrey Boteler and Sir Francis Anderson).

Lord Chichester as predicted had no sons. On his death in 1653 his baronetcy became extinct, equally the barony of Dunsmore as his stepson Sir John (who was conferred a baronetcy in 1629) had died childless in 1630. The earldom passed to Lord Southampton (see Earl of Southampton for earlier history of this title), who had no male issue; on his death in 1667 both earldoms became extinct.

=== Family background ===
Lord Mayor of London, Sir Thomas Leigh

The first earl was the grandson of Sir William Leigh, third son of Sir Thomas Leigh (c. 1504–1571), Lord Mayor of London for 1558.

Great-uncles of first Earl paternal ancestors of the Barons Leigh

- Sir William's eldest brother Rowland was an ancestor of the recipient of the final, second creation in 1838
- Sir William's next-eldest brother Sir Thomas was an ancestor of the recipient of 1643-1786 creation and was made a baronet, of the same territorial designation of these baronies, Stoneleigh, Warwickshire, owning Stoneleigh Abbey.

== Second creation (1675) ==
The title was created again in the Peerage of England in 1675 however as a subsidiary/courtesy title when Charles Fitzroy, illegitimate son of Charles II and Barbara Villiers, was created Duke of Southampton, Earl of Chichester and Baron Newbury. These titles ended in 1774 on the death of the third holder, who was in the third generation.

== Third creation (1801) ==
Family background

The Pelham family descends from Thomas Pelham of Laughton, Sussex, who represented Lewes and Sussex in the House of Commons. In 1611 he was created a baronet, of Laughton in the Baronetage of England. He was succeeded by his son, the second Baronet who sat as MP for East Grinstead and Sussex. His son, the third Baronet, represented Hastings and Sussex in Parliament for many years. He was succeeded by his son, the fourth Baronet who was as MP for East Grinstead, Lewes and Sussex, served as a Commissioner of Customs and as a Lord of the Treasury.

Baron Pelham

In 1706 the fourth baronet was raised to the Peerage of England as Lord Pelham, Baron Pelham, of Laughton. He married as his second wife Lady Grace Holles, daughter of Gilbert Holles, 3rd Earl of Clare (see the Earl of Clare).

Sons of 1st Baron Pelham serving as Prime Minister

The second son of 1st Baron Pelham was the prominent statesman Hon. Henry Pelham, Prime Minister 1743–1754.

Henry's older brother became the second Baron and served as Prime Minister 1754-1756 and 1757–1762. He inherited vast estates on the death of John Holles, 1st Duke of Newcastle-upon-Tyne (1662–1711) (his mother's brother) and took by Royal licence the additional surname 'Holles' in 1711. In 1714 the Earldom of Clare was revived in his favour with special remainder to his younger brother, the earlier Prime Minister. Surpassing this, the next year his maternal uncle's title was revived; he was made Duke of Newcastle-upon-Tyne with similar remainder to his younger brother Henry. (Note: These titles were in the Peerage of Great Britain.)

In 1756, Henry Pelham having died without male issue, the childless Duke of Newcastle-upon-Tyne was created Duke of Newcastle-under-Lyne which bore special remainder to Henry Pelham-Clinton, 9th Earl of Lincoln – son of his sister Lucy, wife of Henry Clinton, 7th Earl of Lincoln) (this 9th Earl, created 2nd Duke, married his first cousin Catherine, daughter of Henry). In 1762 he was also made Baron Pelham of Stanmer which bore special remainder to his first cousin once removed Thomas Pelham. (Note: These titles were in the Peerage of Great Britain.)

Effect of Special Remainders

The Duke was childless and on his death in 1768 the barony of Pelham and the creations of 1714 and 1715 became extinct. The dukedom of 1756 passed to the Earl of Lincoln. The Duke was also succeeded in the baronetcy and in the barony of Pelham of Stanmer by first cousin once-removed Thomas Pelham, the second Baron. He was the son of Thomas Pelham, Member of Parliament for Lewes, son of Henry Pelham, third son of the third Baronet. Like his cousins, he was also a politician. He represented Rye and Sussex in the House of Commons and served as a Commissioner of Trade and Plantations, as a Lord of the Admiralty and as Comptroller of the Household. In 1801 he was honoured when he was created Earl of Chichester in the Peerage of the United Kingdom.

He was succeeded by his eldest son, the second Earl. He was also an influential politician and held office as Chief Secretary for Ireland, as Home Secretary and as Postmaster General. In 1801, during his father's lifetime, he was summoned to the House of Lords through a writ of acceleration in his father's junior title of Baron Pelham of Stanmer. His eldest son, the third Earl, was Lord Lieutenant of Sussex from 1860 to 1886. On his death, the titles passed to his eldest son, the fourth Earl. He sat as Liberal Member of Parliament for Lewes. He died childless and was succeeded by his younger brother, the fifth Earl. He was an Anglican cleric including Rector of Lambeth.

The fifth Earl was succeeded by his eldest son, the sixth Earl, who died of pneumonia on 14 November 1926, age 55. His eldest son succeeded but also died of pneumonia having been Earl for eight days, on 22 November. He was succeeded by his younger brother, the eighth Earl, who was killed in a road accident in Doncaster while on active service in the Second World War. He was succeeded by his son, the ninth Earl, born seven weeks after his father's death. If the ninth earl had been born a girl or had not survived early childhood, the title would have passed to Hon. Henry George Godolphin Pelham (1875–1949), second son of the fifth Earl. The ninth Lord Chichester has served as a board member of music institutions.

== Notable relations ==
- Rt. Rev. Hon. George Pelham, third son of the first Earl, served successively as Bishop of Bristol, Exeter and Lincoln.
- Hon. Frederick Thomas Pelham, second son of the second Earl, was Rear-Admiral in the Royal Navy.
- Rt. Rev. Hon. John Thomas Pelham, third son of the second Earl, was Bishop of Norwich.
  - His eldest son Henry Francis Pelham was Camden Professor of Ancient History at Oxford University.

== Seats and other abodes ==
The family laid out Stanmer Park and had built and lavishly decorated successions of Stanmer House, Stanmer, East Sussex which it acquired in 1713. In 1947, death duties following the unexpected deaths of three earls from 1926 to 1944 forced trustees for the then-3-year-old ninth earl to sell the estate to a local Council, the Brighton Corporation. The senior branch of the family owns and occupies Little Durnford Manor, Durnford, Wiltshire since 1966.

== Earls of Chichester, first creation (1644) ==
- Francis Leigh, 1st Earl of Chichester (d. 1653)
- Thomas Wriothesley, 4th Earl of Southampton, 2nd Earl of Chichester (1608–1667)

== Earls of Chichester, second creation (1675) ==
- See Duke of Southampton

== Pelham baronets, of Laughton (1611) ==
- Sir Thomas Pelham, 1st Baronet (1540–1624)
- Sir Thomas Pelham, 2nd Baronet (1597–1654)
- Sir John Pelham, 3rd Baronet (1623–1703)
- Sir Thomas Pelham, 4th Baronet (1653–1712) (created Baron Pelham in 1706)

== Barons Pelham, of Laughton (1706) ==
- Thomas Pelham, 1st Baron Pelham (1653–1712)
- Thomas Pelham-Holles, 2nd Baron Pelham (1693–1768) (created Duke of Newcastle upon Tyne in 1715 and Duke of Newcastle-under-Lyne in 1756)

== Dukes of Newcastle (1715/1756) ==
- Thomas Pelham-Holles, 1st Duke of Newcastle (1693–1768) (created Baron Pelham of Stanmer in 1762)

== Barons Pelham of Stanmer (1762) ==
- Thomas Pelham-Holles, 1st Duke of Newcastle, 1st Baron Pelham of Stanmer (1693–1768)
- Thomas Pelham, 2nd Baron Pelham of Stanmer (1728–1805) (created Earl of Chichester in 1801)

== Earls of Chichester, third creation (1801) ==
- Thomas Pelham, 1st Earl of Chichester (1728–1805)
- Thomas Pelham, 2nd Earl of Chichester (1756–1826)
- Henry Pelham, 3rd Earl of Chichester (1804–1886)
- Walter Pelham, 4th Earl of Chichester (1838–1902)
- Francis Pelham, 5th Earl of Chichester (1844–1905)
- Jocelyn Pelham, 6th Earl of Chichester (1871–1926)
- Francis Pelham, 7th Earl of Chichester (1905–1926)
- John Pelham, 8th Earl of Chichester (1912–1944)
- John Pelham, 9th Earl of Chichester (b. 1944)

The heir presumptive is the present holder's second cousin once removed, Duncan James Bergengren Pelham (b. 1987).

Line of succession, simplified
- Thomas Pelham, 2nd Earl of Chichester (1756–1826)
  - Henry Pelham, 3rd Earl of Chichester (1804–1886)
    - Walter Pelham, 4th Earl of Chichester (1838–1902)
    - Francis Pelham, 5th Earl of Chichester (1844–1905)
      - Jocelyn Pelham, 6th Earl of Chichester (1871–1926)
        - Francis Pelham, 7th Earl of Chichester (1905–1926)
        - John Pelham, 8th Earl of Chichester (1912–1944)
          - John Pelham, 9th Earl of Chichester (born 1944)
      - Hon. Henry George Godolphin Pelham (1875–1949)
        - Anthony George Pelham (1911–1969)
          - Richard Anthony Henry Pelham (1952–2025)
            - (1). Duncan James Bergengren Pelham (born 1987)
            - (2). Christopher Douglas Gilmour Pelham (born 1990)
    - Hon. Thomas Henry William Pelham (1847–1916)
      - Walter Henry Pelham (1886–1949)
        - Thomas Bertram Pelham (1915–1984)
          - (3). Philip Henry Pelham (born 1949)
            - (4). Andrew Timothy Pelham (born 1984)
          - (5). David Almgren Pelham (born 1950)
            - (6). Thomas James Pelham (born 1982)
              - (7). William Jack Pelham (born 2012)
          - (8). Peter Thomas Pelham (born 1952)
            - (9). Henry William Pelham (born 1982)
              - (10). Zane William Pelham (born 2013)
          - (11). Erik John Christopher Pelham (born 1954)
            - (12). Alexander Pelham (born 1990)
            - (13). Joseph Pelham (born 1992)
            - (14). Samuel Pelham (born 1994)
            - (15). Jack Pelham (born 1998)
          - (16). James Richard Pelham (born 1955)
        - Robert Henry Pelham (1919–1980)
          - male issue in remainder
  - John Thomas Pelham (1811–1894)
    - Henry Francis Pelham (1846–1907)
      - Sir Edward Henry Pelham (1876–1949)
        - Eric Thomas Pelham (1915–1984)
          - male issue and descendants in remainder

== See also ==
- Anderson baronets, of St Ives
- Baron Leigh
- Earl of Clare

== Notes and references ==
Notes

Baronetage of England
Preceded by Leke baronets	Pelham baronets 22 May 1611	Succeeded by Hoghton baronets
Preceded by Lyttelton baronets	Leigh baronets of Newnham; 24 December 1618	Succeeded by Burdett baronets
