= Francis Pelham, 5th Earl of Chichester =

British cleric and nobleman

Reverend Francis Godolphin Pelham, 5th Earl of Chichester (18 October 1844 – 21 April 1905), known as Hon. Francis Pelham until 1902, was a British cleric and nobleman.

== Life ==
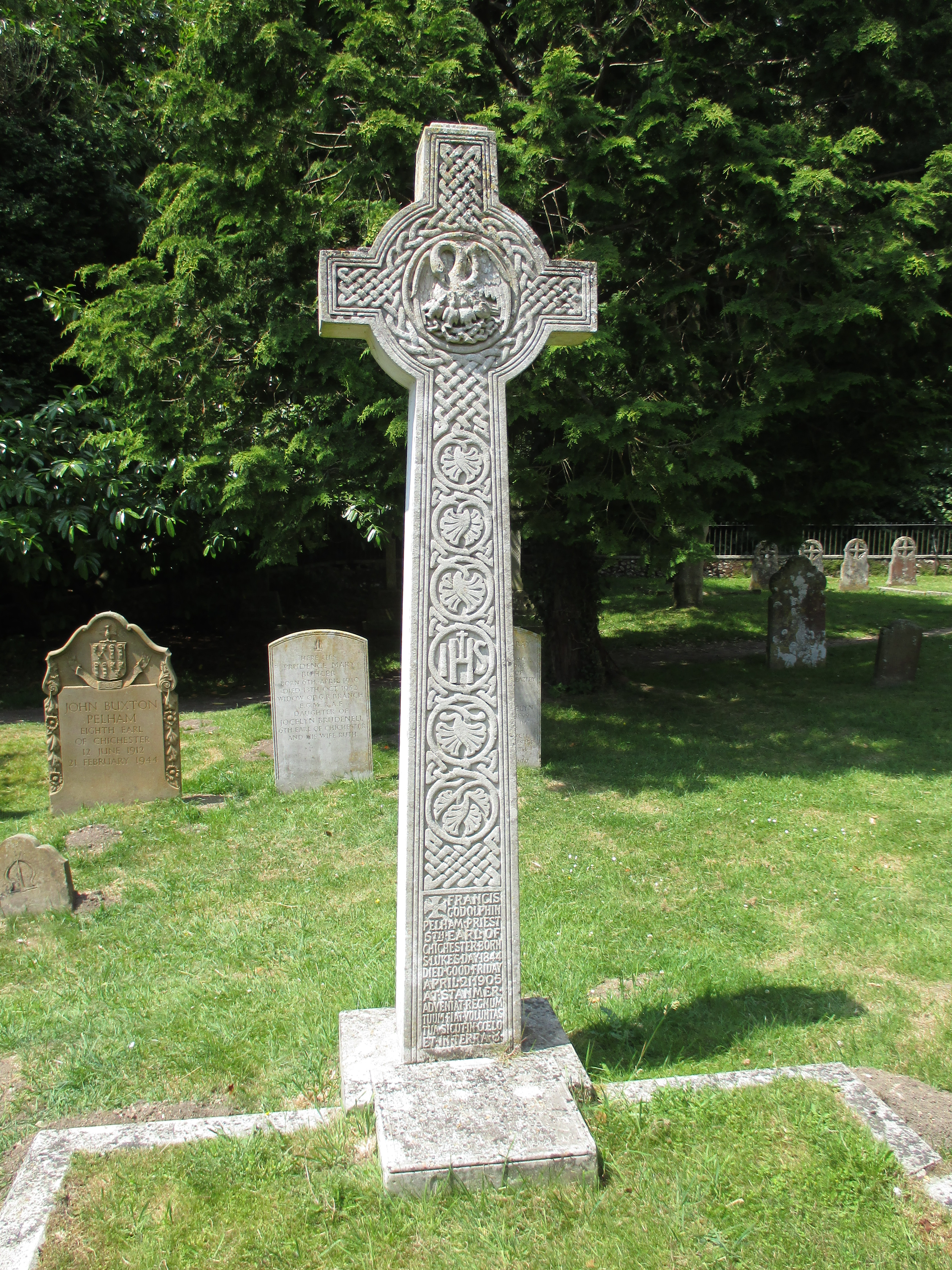
The 5th Earl of Chichester's grave in Stanmer churchyard, East Sussex

Pelham was the son of Henry Pelham, 3rd Earl of Chichester and Lady Mary Brudenell. He was educated at Eton and Trinity College, Cambridge, where he was a sporting 'blue', representing the university in athletics and cricket and playing cricket for Sussex before graduating with a BA in 1868. Pursuing a career in the church, he was rector of Lambeth from 1884 to 1894, rector of Buckhurst Hill, Essex from 1894 to 1900 and Vicar of Great Yarmouth from 1900 to 1903. He was also a Canon of Bangor Cathedral.

Pelham succeeded his elder brother Walter Pelham (who died childless) as Earl of Chichester in May 1902.

He was also a member of the Wanderers amateur football club.

== Marriage and issue ==
On 4 August 1870 he married Alice Carr Glyn, daughter of George Glyn, 1st Baron Wolverton, and Marianne Grenfell. They had issue, including Jocelyn who succeeded to the title and their youngest son, Hon Herbert L Pelham, of the Royal Sussex Regiment, Croix De Chevalier Legion d'Honeur, who was killed during WWI, in the First Battle of the Aisne on September 14th 1914. Alice was the Central President of Mothers' Union from 1910 to 1916, second President of the organization after its foundress, Mary Elizabeth Sumner.

== Coat of arms ==
Coat of arms of Francis Pelham, 5th Earl of Chichester
| Coronet A coronet of an Earl Crest A peacock in pride argent. Escutcheon Quarterly: 1st and 4th azure, three pelicans vulning themselves argent; 2nd and 3rd gules, two pieces of belts with buckles, erect in pale, the buckles upwards argent. Supporters Dexter, a horse of a mouse dun colour; Sinister, a bear proper, each collared with a belt, buckle and pendant or. Motto Vincit amor patriae (The love of my country will prevail). Badge The buckle of a belt or. |

Peerage of the United Kingdom
| Preceded by Walter John Pelham | Earl of Chichester; 1902–1905 | Succeeded by Jocelyn Brudenell Pelham |
