= Marine Gate =

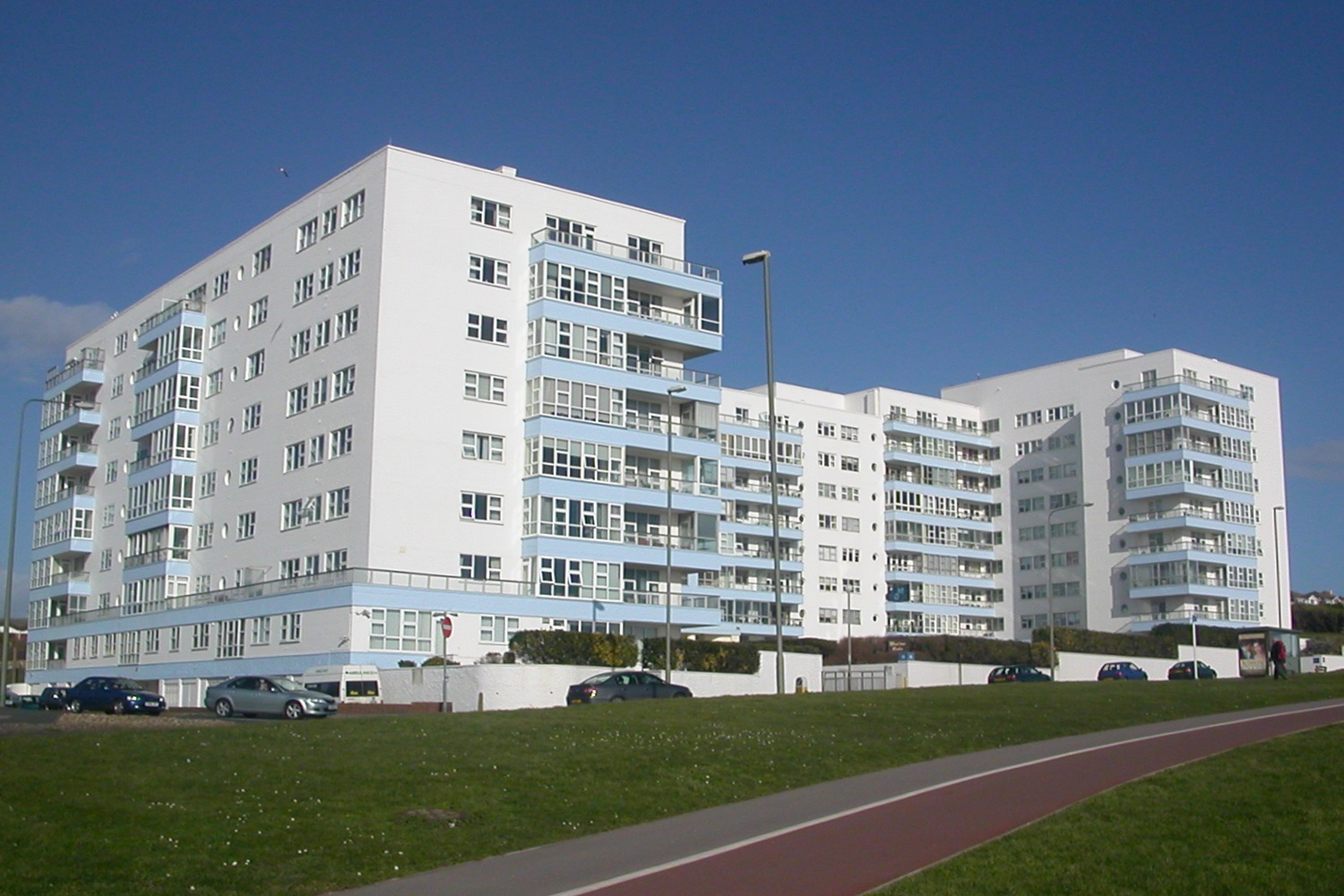
- Marine Gate from the southwest

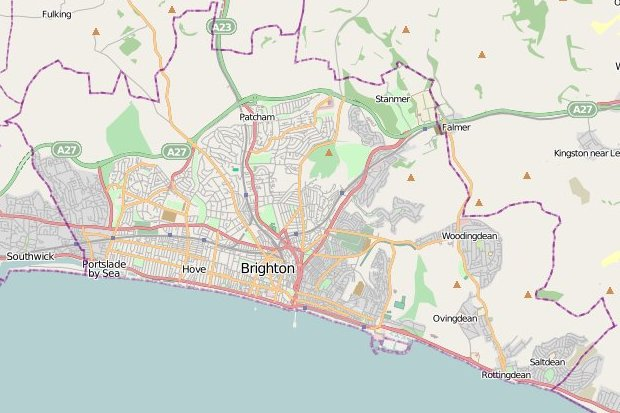
- Location within Brighton & Hove

General information
- Status: Completed
- Type: Flats
- Architectural style: International/Modern
- Location: Marine Drive, Black Rock, Brighton BN2 5TN, Brighton and Hove, United Kingdom
- Coordinates: 50.8153°N 0.1037°W
- Groundbreaking: 1937
- Completed: 1939
- Owner: Marine Gate Holdings Ltd

Technical details
- Floor count: 8

Design and construction
- Architect: Maurice Bloom
- Architecture firm: Wimperis, Simpson and Guthrie

Marine Gate is a large block of over 50's flats built in 1939 to the design of architects Wimperis, Simpson and Guthrie. It stands to the East of the English seaside resort of Brighton bordering Whitehawk and Roedean, and is situated in the Rottingdean Coastal ward overlooking Brighton Marina and Black Rock. Originally built with 105 flats, a restaurant and offices, internal reconfiguration has increased the number of flats to 132. The International/Modern-style building is situated in a clifftop position at the eastern border of Brighton. Its proximity next to a derelict gasworks continually blocked for redevelopment by residents of Marine Gate. Proximity to the gas works resulted in Marine Gate being damaged by bombs several times during World War II, to the extent that it was Brighton's most indirectly bombed building.

The block is situated on an approach to Brighton Kemptown from the east. Its form, with Modernist features has invoked strong opinions among architectural critics. Described variously as "interesting", "elegant" and "comparing favourably with Embassy Court" (a building of the same era further west), a 2002 critique by Anthony Seldon placed it among "the city's worst ten buildings".

== History ==
Brighton's seafront has been characterised since the mid-19th century by "monumental domestic architecture" in the Regency style—"one of the great sequences of Regency and Early Victorian town planning in England". Stuccoed terraces and crescents stretch several miles along the coast, terminating in the east at the Kemp Town development consisting of Arundel Terrace, Chichester Terrace, Lewes Crescent and Sussex Square. Beyond this, the landscape changed significantly at Black Rock, the westernmost point at which the South Downs meet the English Channel. Brighton's eastern boundary (and until 1928, the boundary of the whole borough) was fixed here in 1606, and the only substantial development until the 20th century was a gasworks established by the Brighton Gas Light and Coke Company. Some terraced houses, inns and commercial buildings followed. Until the early 1930s, an old turnpike ran along the top of the cliffs to the village of Rottingdean. In around 1931 it was closed and rebuilt further inland, requiring the demolition of several small houses.

In 1936, Marine Parade Estates (1936) Ltd was formed with the aim of developing land in the area behind the new road for housing. It leased a large site next to the gasworks from the landowner, Brighton Corporation (who had themselves acquired it in May 1931). The company commissioned architects Wimperis, Simpson and Guthrie to design a large block of flats for rent (initially, none were sold for owner-occupation). Under the guidance of this firm, Maurice Bloom was responsible for the design; he owned Courtenay Gate, a large block of flats on Hove seafront. Work started in 1937 and was complete in 1939, and Marine Gate opened on 5 May 1939. The building was marketed as "the most up-to-date fully serviced block of flats in the south of England": it had two restaurants for residents, shops, office accommodation with its own telephone exchange (the flats lacked private telephone lines at first), a cocktail bar, offices for the managing agents Fox & Sons, communal garages and sea views from every flat; some also had north-facing windows looking towards the South Downs. Various short leases were available for residents, and rents varied between £140 and £475 per year at first.

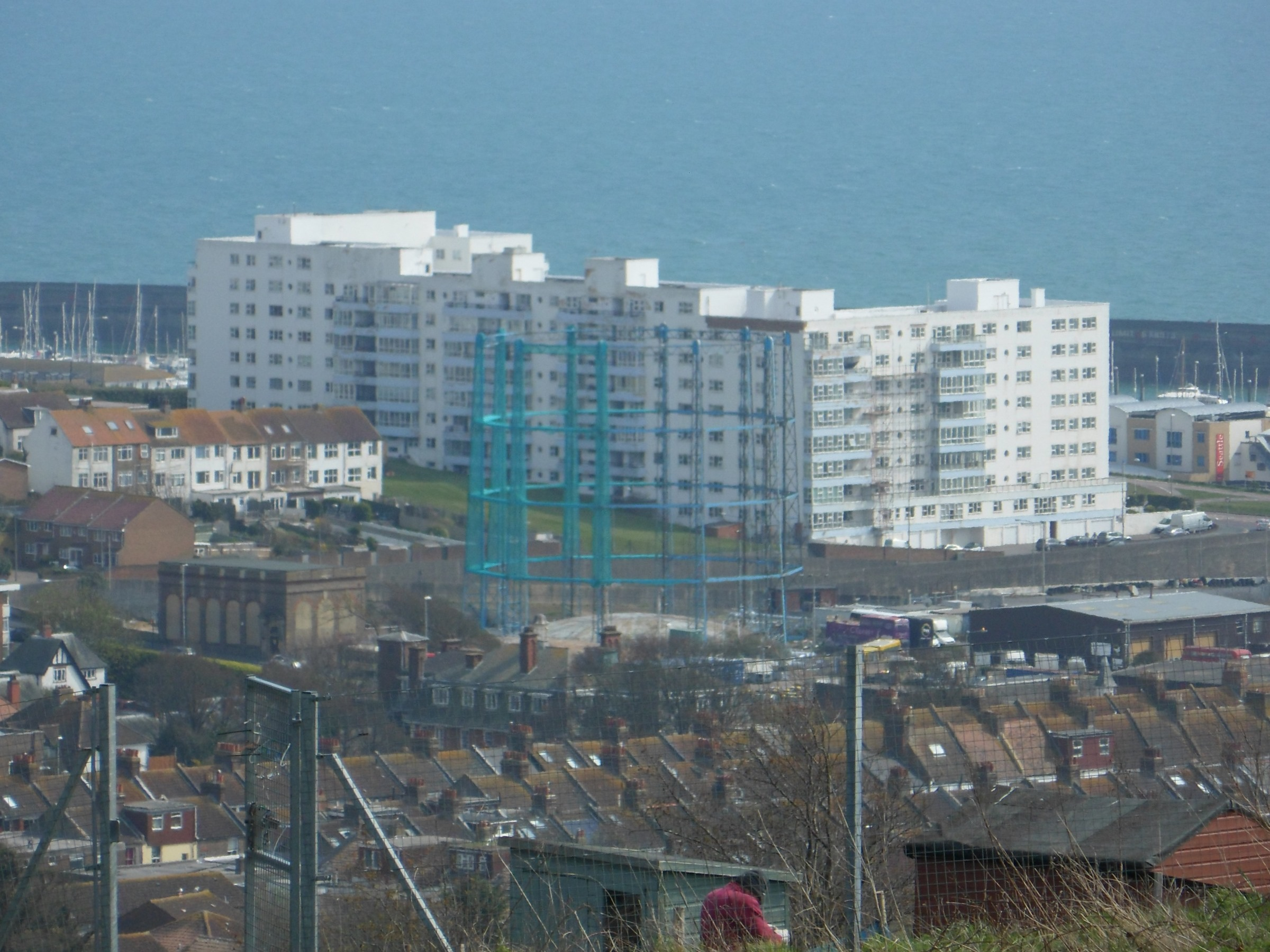
Marine Gate (seen here from Whitehawk Hill) is close to a large gasworks, which was a target for wartime bombing.

World War II broke out soon after Marine Gate was completed. Not all flats were let at first, and empty ones were commandeered by the Navy to accommodate personnel based at the Mining and Torpedo School established in the nearby Roedean School (known during the war as HMS Vernon). The Royal Air Force also established a lookout post at Marine Gate. Its proximity to Brighton's main gasworks and the cliffs gave it collateral damage from bombing and other attacks. More generally, Brighton and other south coast areas were susceptible to attack because they were easy targets—close to continental Europe and not strongly defended; spare bombs left over from bombing raids elsewhere in England were often released over the coast; and Hitler considered invading Britain by way of the Sussex coast near Brighton. The eastern part of Brighton fared worst, and Marine Gate was the most affected building in the whole town: "very tall, very white and an easy target", it was "strafed with machine gun fire", damaged by explosions at the gas works and bombed more times than any other structure.

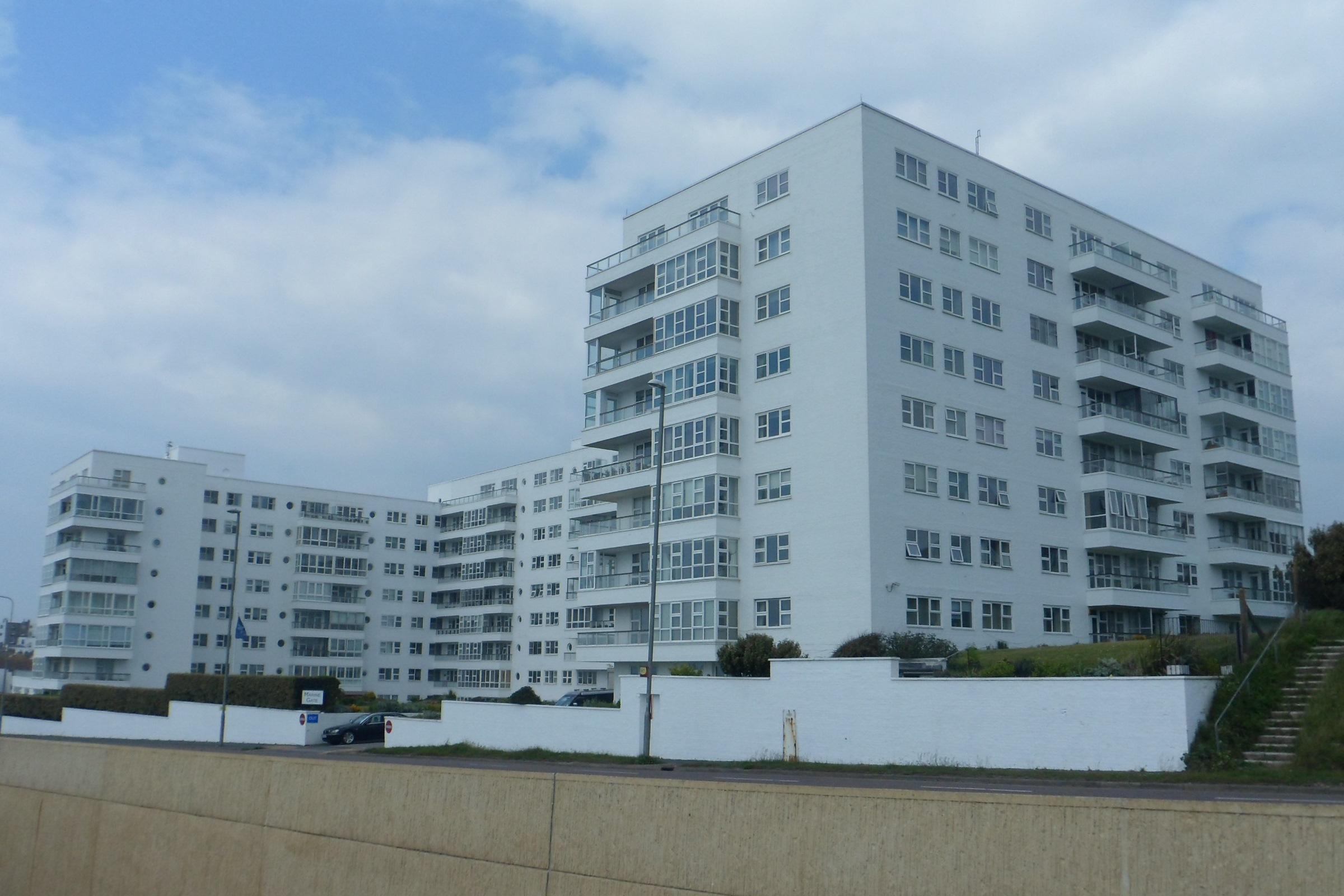
The u-shaped building stands behind communal gardens.

In an attack lasting just 15 seconds on 26 June 1942, Marine Gate was hit by 22 shells fired by two Messerschmitt Bf 109 aircraft, and was further damaged by fire from the gasometer which exploded at the same time. On 29 August 1942, machine gun bullets and a bomb caused serious damage. One resident, Claudette Mawby (a Hollywood child star as one of The Mawby Triplets), was killed when she was blown to the bottom of the building's lift shaft by the blast. Most of the building's windows were shattered. Brighton's worst air raid, on 25 May 1943, affected Marine Gate badly. A large bomb passed through one adjacent building and exploded in another, just missing some workmen. Soon afterwards, three bombs were aimed at the block. One cut through the building at fourth-floor level, destroying three flats and leaving its fin stuck in the floor of one; a second bounced off a patch of wasteland and hit a house before cutting right through Marine Gate, exploding on the road outside; and the third broke every window when it exploded at the southeast corner at ground-floor level. There was also fire damage from another explosion at the gasworks. No residents died, but many were injured, and the artist Percy Shakespeare (who was serving in the Royal Navy and was based at HMS Vernon at nearby Roedean School) was killed as he walked past Marine Gate. After this attack, all residents were evacuated and the building was left unrepaired. Another raid on 23 February 1944 caused more damage: Marine Gate was hit by one of several bombs dropped that night.

After the war ended, repairs were made and people moved back in. The original layout, with 105 flats, was changed to accommodate more: the main restaurant was taken out in 1955 and the space divided into flats, and the number of flats available went up to 120. The shops were converted into additional garages as well. These changes reflected the decline in the demand for hotel-style serviced apartment blocks: longer leases began to be offered, some flats were sold to their occupiers, and residents were able to become shareholders in the leaseholding company, Marine Gate Holdings Ltd. Its subsidiary Marine Gate Management Ltd runs and manages the building. There are now 132 flats, each with "American-style" numbering in which each floor has a letter. Flats range in size from one to four bedrooms. The garaging below the block has allocated parking, bicycle storage and a carwash facility, and there are about 4 acres (1.6 ha) of south-facing gardens in front of the building. Marine Gate Holdings Ltd Directors are appointed by leaseholders. There are two sets of seven lifts inside.

== Architecture ==
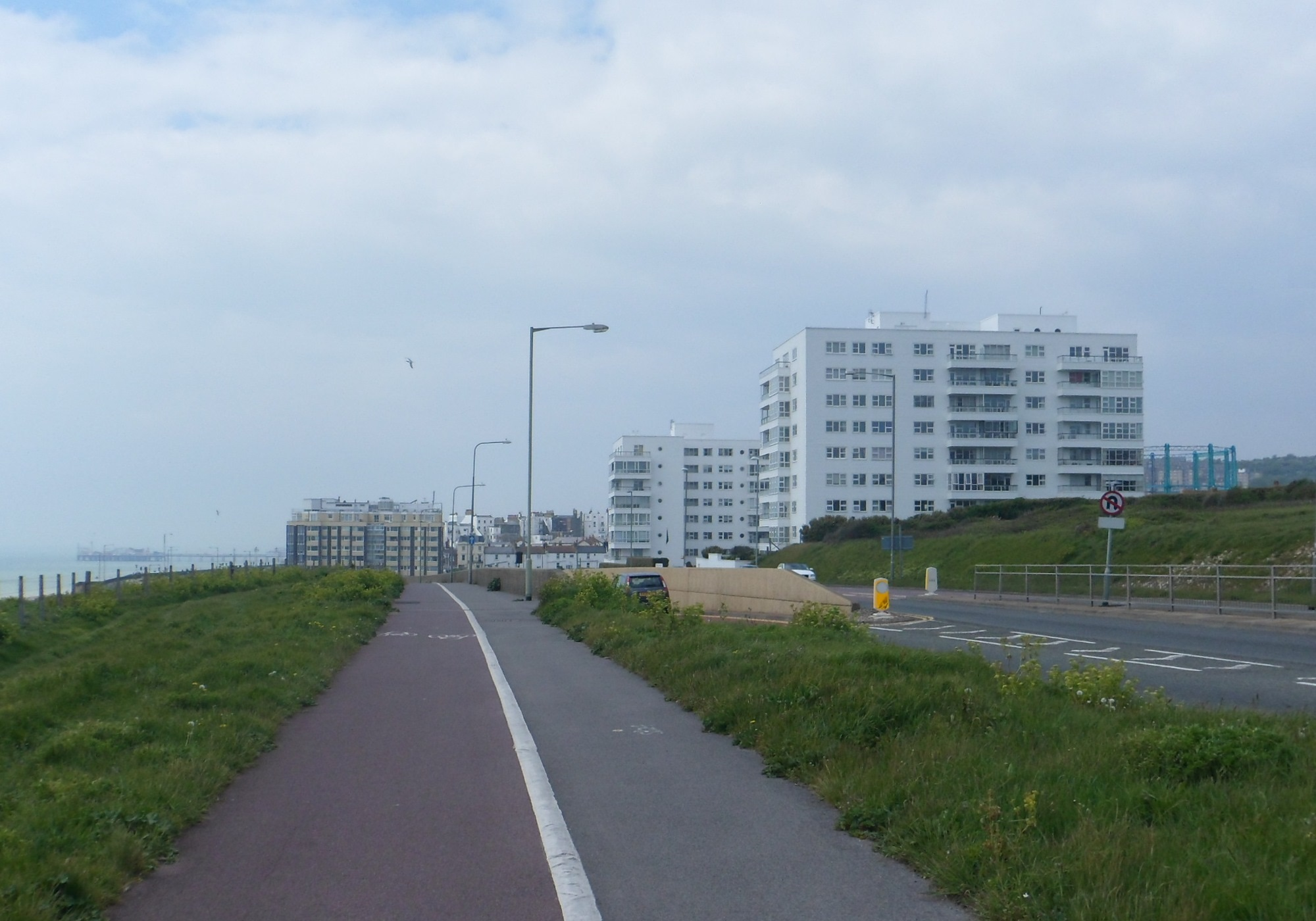
Marine Gate dominates the eastern approach to Brighton.

Wimperis, Simpson and Guthrie were a London-based firm active between the mid-1920s and the mid-1940s. Edmund Walter Wimperis (1865–1946), son of Edmund Morison Wimperis (1835–1900), entered into partnership with William Begg Simpson (1880–1959) in 1913. Their main commission as a pair was the rebuild of the Fortnum & Mason store in 1923. Leonard Rome Guthrie (1880–1958) joined two years later when the architects were working with Edwin Lutyens on Grosvenor House in London. They were known to have designed some buildings in Scotland and others in London.

Marine Gate is a u-shaped building on a large elevated plot. It is steel-framed and brick-built; after many changes the brickwork is now painted white, with entrance portals in Bauhaus red, yellow and blue. Each flat has a round window to the bathroom; these porthole-style openings "give a vaguely nautical air". It is International/Modernist style, as seen in several 1920s and 1930s buildings around the city. Integral fitted furniture was provided, and each flat has "indisputable spaciousness and elegant proportions". The steel framing has allowed for changes to be made in the interior layout, as the internal walls are not load-bearing.

The building is now being recognised for its pioneering architecture and landmark status, and in 2015 Brighton and Hove Council added Marine Gate to its Local List of Heritage Assets. One commentator failed to see its merits: Anthony Seldon placed Marine Gate at seventh place in his list of "The City's Worst Ten Buildings" in 2002 "on account of its insensitivity to its position". He compared it unfavourably to Embassy Court, noting its similarities but finding "little intrinsic architectural interest" in Marine Gate. Local historian Clifford Musgrave however drew positive comparisons with Embassy Court, noting that the two buildings provided "the first challenge to the [Regency] architecture of Brighton", and claiming that Marine Gate's "slightly more elegant modern style" was more suitable to its position because unlike Embassy Court it did not clash directly with older buildings. The "immense building" was also criticised much less at the time of its construction than Embassy Court, again because of its isolated clifftop position. Other writers have described Marine Gate as a "good example of quality Thirties apartments" and, more generally, "...of the many large-scale flats built along the coast" in the interwar period. Other similar contemporary buildings on the seafront include the Grand Ocean Hotel at Saltdean and the Saltdean Lido, both designed in 1938 and both with Moderne and Art Deco touches.
