= Grade I listed buildings in Brighton and Hove =

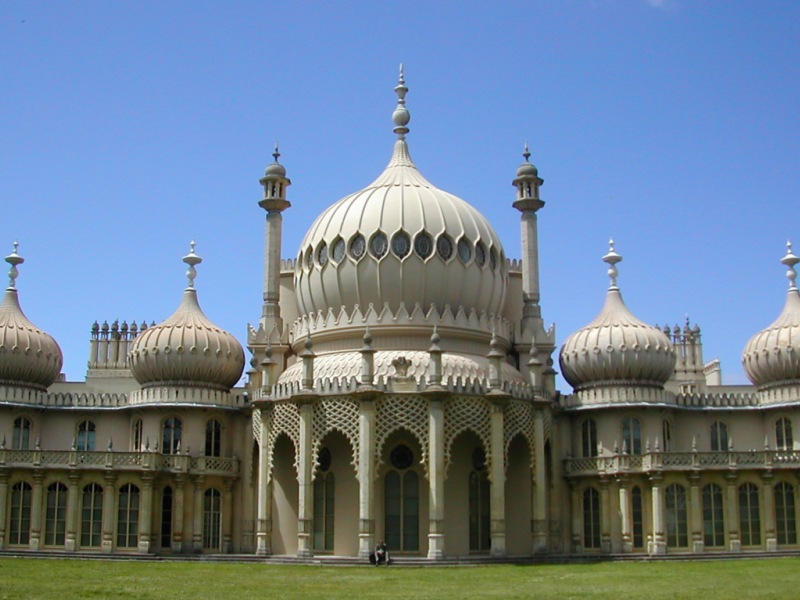
The Royal Pavilion was built for the Prince Regent by John Nash.

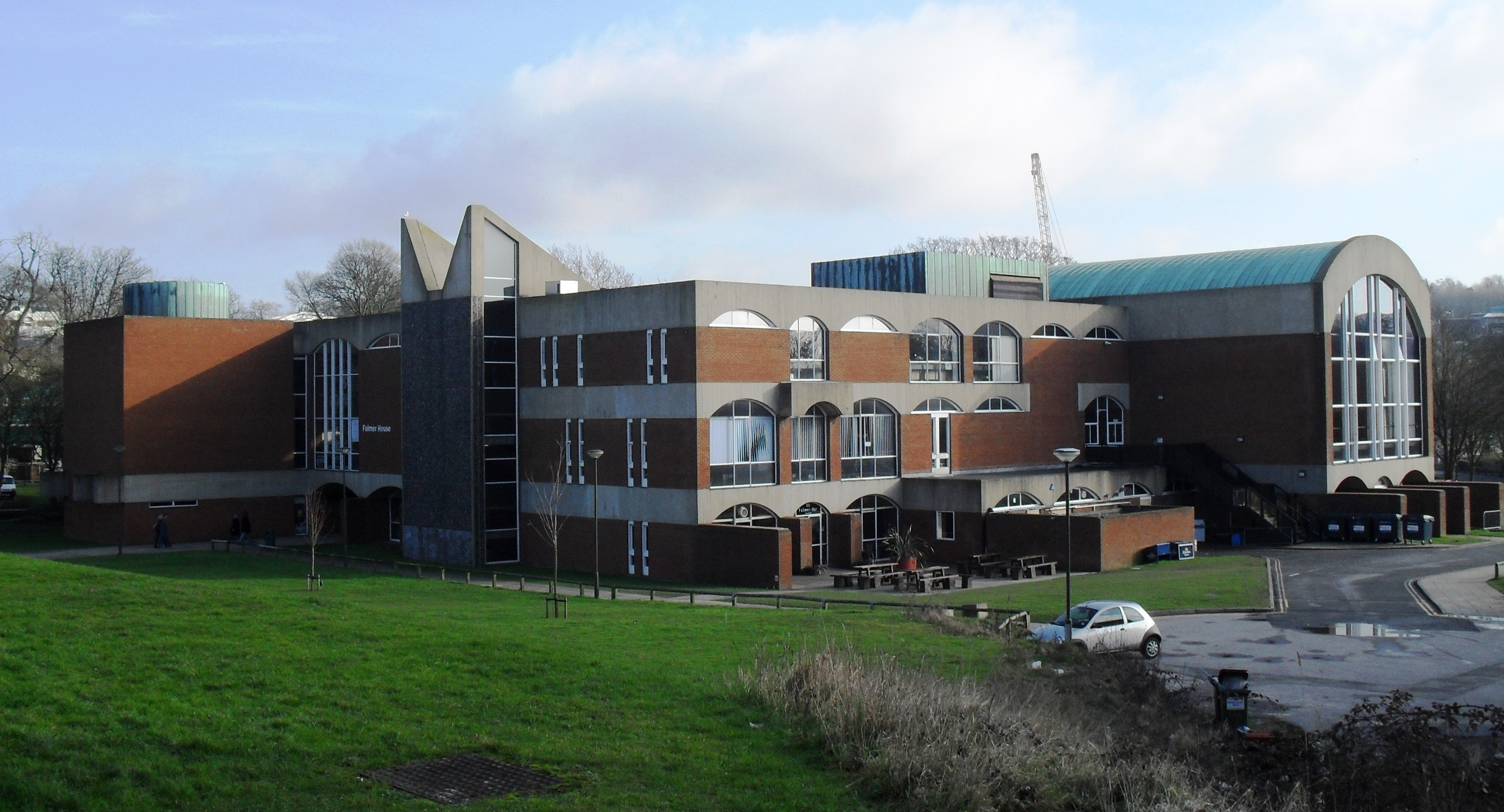
Sir Basil Spence designed many buildings on the campus of the University of Sussex, including Falmer House.

There are 24 Grade I listed buildings in the city of Brighton and Hove, England. The city, on the English Channel coast approximately 52 miles (84 km) south of London, was formed as a unitary authority in 1997 by the merger of the neighbouring towns of Brighton and Hove. Queen Elizabeth II granted city status in 2000.

In England, a building or structure is defined as "listed" when it is placed on a statutory register of buildings of "special architectural or historic interest" by the Secretary of State for Culture, Media and Sport, a Government department, in accordance with the Planning (Listed Buildings and Conservation Areas) Act 1990. English Heritage, a non-departmental public body, acts as an agency of this department to administer the process and advise the department on relevant issues. There are three grades of listing status: Grade I, the highest, defined as being of "exceptional interest"; Grade II*, "particularly important buildings of more than special interest"; and Grade II, the lowest, used for buildings of "special interest".

Brighton and its westerly neighbour Hove developed independently as fishing villages on the English Channel coastline. Brighton was founded as a Saxon homestead and had a population of about 400 at the time of the Domesday survey in 1086. Hove had a long tradition of farming on the fertile downland behind the coast, and was also known for smuggling activity. Both places were in decline in the mid-17th century; but local doctor Richard Russell's advocacy of drinking and bathing in seawater at Brighton attracted members of Britain's high society and royalty. This included the Prince of Wales, who commissioned architect John Nash to build a house; the result was the city's best-known building, the architecturally eclectic Royal Pavilion.

Helped by its proximity to London, good climate and the royal patronage it enjoyed, Brighton developed rapidly in the early 19th century: the number of houses doubled to about 8,000 between 1820 and 1830. Three local architects—Charles Busby, Amon Wilds and his son Amon Henry Wilds—were responsible for several innovative, practical and elegant residential developments and public buildings in both Brighton and Hove. The Kemp Town and Brunswick estates bordered Brighton to the east and west respectively. The town was thereby joined to Hove, in turn stimulating its growth. Kemp Town was primarily the work of Barry and Wilds senior, and was conceived as a seven-part design: two sea-facing terraces (Arundel Terrace and Chichester Terrace), a square (Sussex Square) with houses on three sides, and a two-part crescent (Lewes Crescent) joining these sections. All seven parts are listed at Grade I. Similarly, the four parts of Brunswick Terrace and the east and west sides of Brunswick Square, which formed the main part of the Wilds and Busby partnership's Brunswick estate, have been awarded Grade I status.

A combination of Victorian enthusiasm for church-building, the importance of churchgoing as part of Brighton's social calendar and a need to provide places for poor people to worship resulted in many churches being built in Brighton and Hove in the 19th century. Five have a Grade I listing, including one that is no longer in use. The pleasure pier was another Victorian trend, and Brighton's West Pier is one of only two Grade I-listed piers in England; it is now in ruins after a series of storms and fires caused it to collapse. After it closed in 1975, a section fell into the sea in 1984, then the Great Storm of 1987 caused more damage. Partial demolition followed, but in the space of five months from December 2002 it suffered two further collapses and two devastating fires.

In the 20th century, both Brighton and Hove expanded by absorbing surrounding villages, many of which had ancient buildings. Ovingdean and Stanmer were two such places, and Ovingdean's 12th-century parish church and an early 18th-century mansion in Stanmer Park—now the city's largest expanse of green space—are the oldest Grade I listed buildings in Brighton and Hove. Sussex University, built on open land near Stanmer as the first new university of the post-war era, was designed by Sir Basil Spence; Falmer House, the main building on the campus, received a Grade I listing in 1993 and is the most recently built Grade I building in the city.

== Grade I listed buildings ==
Grade one listed buildings
Name	Image	Completed	Location	Notes	Refs
St Wulfran's Church		c. 1100	Ovingdean; 50.8157°N 0.0775°W	Ovingdean became part of the Borough of Brighton in 1928, and is still a small village surrounded by fields. Its 12th-century flint-built church is considered the oldest building in the city of Brighton and Hove. The tower, with "Sussex Cap" spire, was added in the 13th century, and a porch was added during a 19th-century restoration.	
Stanmer House		1727	Stanmer; 50.8693°N 0.1022°W	Henry Pelham commissioned Nicholas Dubois to rebuild the family's house, on the Stanmer estate east of Brighton. The Palladian mansion has eight bays, three of which project forwards beneath a pediment. The ashlar, brick and flint building is Dubois' only surviving work in England.	
Marlborough House and attached railings		1786	Brighton; 50.8220°N 0.1386°W	A local hotel owner had this house built for him in 1769. Two years later the 4th Duke of Marlborough bought it; in 1786 he sold it to politician William Gerard Hamilton, who commissioned Robert Adam to redesign it. The five-bay exterior has pediments above the outermost bays, Doric columns and ground-floor Palladian windows. Nikolaus Pevsner called it "the finest house in Brighton".	
The Corn Exchange and Dome Theatre		1808	Brighton; 50.8235°N 0.1383°W	William Porden's Indo-Saracenic riding school and stables, built for King George IV, had an 80-foot (24 m) diameter glass and wood dome, which has given its name to the theatre and concert hall which now occupies the building. The conversion took place in the 1930s.	
Royal Pavilion		1823	Brighton; 50.8225°N 0.1375°W	The "legacy of a profligate prince" epitomises both the Regency era and Brighton itself. It took more than 35 years to transform a farmhouse on Old Steine into the Prince Regent's residence, and he abandoned Brighton soon afterwards. The opulent exterior is a combination of Indo-Saracenic and Orientalist styles.	
1–29 Brunswick Square and attached railings		1827	Brunswick, Hove; 50.8240°N 0.1585°W	The east side of Brunswick Square was started in 1825. The houses have four or five storeys; all have three windows on their front elevation; and all but six are bow-fronted. Four of the flat-fronted houses (those at the north end) have large Corinthian pilasters below a parapet with a balustrade. Original sash windows and iron balconies are still in place.	
30–58, 30A and 33A Brunswick Square and attached railings		1827	Brunswick, Hove; 50.8244°N 0.1597°W	The west side of the square is similar to the eastern section. The houses vary between three, four and five storeys in height, and some have two-window façades (most are triple-fronted). Busby and Wilds used a mixture of Ionic, Corinthian and Doric columns, pilasters and chambranles. The roadside railings are cast iron.	
St Andrew's Church		1827	Brunswick, Hove; 50.8235°N 0.1571°W	Sir Charles Barry built this church as a proprietary chapel for Rev. Edward Everard. He had fallen out with the architect of the Brunswick estate, Charles Busby, who had originally been expected to design the church to serve the estate. Barry's design was the first ecclesiastical use of the Italianate style in England, and the church became fashionable in high society and the Royal Family. It was declared redundant in 1990 and is now owned by the Churches Conservation Trust.	
1–10 Sussex Square and attached piers and railings		1827	Kemp Town; 50.8168°N 0.1115°W	Each house has three storeys, a three-window frontage and cast iron balconies. Doric and Tuscan columns are used for the entrance porches. Numbers 1, 4, 7 and 10 have Composite order pilasters at second-storey level. The terrace forms the west side of Sussex Square, the focus of the Kemp Town estate.	
11–40 Sussex Square and attached railings		1827	Kemp Town; 50.8178°N 0.1101°W	Thomas Read Kemp, who conceived and financed Kemp Town, lived at Number 22 for 10 years from 1827. All but two of the houses in the U-shaped terrace have three-window façades; Numbers 25 and 26 span a nine-window range between them. On the east and west sides, six houses jut forwards and feature Composite pilasters of the giant order.	
41–50 Sussex Square and attached railings		1827	Kemp Town; 50.8172°N 0.1095°W	The east side of Sussex Square broadly matches its west side: each house has three bays, a three-window frontage, and cast iron railings leading to either balconies or verandahs at second-storey level. Every third house projects forward and has large Composite pilasters.	
1–13 Arundel Terrace and Arundel House		1828	Kemp Town; 50.8151°N 0.1091°W	The first part of the Kemp Town estate to be built consists of a central five-house block with Corinthian columns, three plain houses on each side and a single projecting house at each end. It was built as a single arrangement of 39 symmetrical bays; each house has three storeys and three bays.	
1–6 Brunswick Terrace and attached railings		1828	Brunswick, Hove; 50.8231°N 0.1570°W	Wilds and Busby designed the easternmost part of Brunswick Terrace as a six-part composition with a central section of four storeys and six bays, flanked by four three-storey houses of three bays each. The second and fifth units are bow-fronted; the others have Ionic columns. A pediment spans the two centre bays at fourth-storey level.	
7–19 Brunswick Terrace and attached railings		1828	Brunswick, Hove; 50.8233°N 0.1581°W	This three-storey terrace has a long mansard roof between the more steeply pitched roofs of the end bays. The symmetrical design is of five parts: two three-bay end buildings, two 12-bay sections and a central part of nine bays below a pediment bearing the lettering brunswick terrace. Corinthian columns, pilasters and capitals feature throughout.	
20–32 Brunswick Terrace and attached railings		1828	Brunswick, Hove; 50.8236°N 0.1607°W	The design of this section was identical to that of 7–19 Brunswick Terrace; but the cupola above the brunswick terrace pediment, absent there, survives on this block.	
33–42 Brunswick Terrace and attached railings		1828	Brunswick, Hove; 50.8238°N 0.1622°W	The western part of the terrace consisted of nine houses and a hotel. A plaque commemorates Prince von Metternich's six-month stay between 1848 and 1849. The second storey of the four-storey terrace has an unbroken balcony of cast iron. The second and third storeys have pilasters between each window, topped by Corinthian capitals.	
1–14 Lewes Crescent and attached railings		1828	Kemp Town; 50.8163°N 0.1124°W	Thomas Cubitt, who lived at Number 13 for a time, built several of the houses in this crescent, to the designs of Wilds and Busby. Five of the houses project slightly, and the end houses are prominently curved. Each house is of three bays and has a cast iron balcony at second-storey level.	
15–28 Lewes Crescent and attached railings		1828	Kemp Town; 50.8157°N 0.1098°W	The layout of the east side of Lewes Crescent is similar to that of its opposite side, but the architectural details of individual houses are different. Many of the entrances are flanked by Doric columns, and three houses have chambranles of Tuscan pilasters. The end houses are curved in order to link the crescent to Arundel Terrace and Sussex Square.	
1–14 Chichester Terrace, Chichester House and attached railings		1855	Kemp Town; 50.8161°N 0.1138°W	The three easternmost houses in Kemp Town's western sea-facing terrace were built first; the others were not completed until 1855, and Number 14 stood separately for several years after its construction in 1832. Thomas Cubitt built Numbers 4–14 using Wilds and Busby's designs as a basis, but he omitted elements such as the Corinthian pilasters used on Numbers 1–3. Several houses had an extra storey added in the 20th century.	
West Pier		1866	Brighton; 50.8208°N 0.1511°W	Eugenius Birch started building this pier—one of Britain's first pleasure piers—in 1863, using cast and wrought iron. It was extended to 1,100 feet (340 m) in 1893; the new section was of steel. A pavilion was built at the sea end in 1890 and a concert hall in 1916. The structure became unsafe in the 1970s, and since then it has been wrecked by storms and fires.	
St Bartholomew's Church		1874	New England Quarter; 50.8308°N 0.1372°W	The gigantic appearance of this church is accentuated by the lack of aisles in the nave, which is the tallest of any British parish church. Edmund Scott's design, inspired by Noah's Ark, caused controversy in the late 19th century—as did the Anglo-Catholic style of Rev. Arthur Wagner's services.	
All Saints Church		1891	Hove; 50.8303°N 0.1674°W	John Loughborough Pearson's Gothic Revival church became Hove's parish church a year after it was completed. He used local sandstone for the exterior. The sanctuary and chancel were not finished until 1901, and the proposed tower was never built.	
St Michael and All Angels Church and attached walls		1895	Montpelier; 50.8274°N 0.1498°W	This Gothic Revival building is two churches in one: George Frederick Bodley's 1862 church became the south aisle of an extension, designed by William Burges and completed after his death, in the same style using red brick with pale sandstone bands. The ornately decorated interior has multi-coloured brickwork, stained glass and a restored 15th-century reredos.	
Falmer House including moat within courtyard		1962	University of Sussex; 50.8235°N 0.1383°W	Sir Basil Spence employed the Modernist style for his work at this early member of the Plate glass university group. Falmer House, the main building on the campus, features concrete vaults and arches, contrasting piers of red brick and copper-faced motifs on the flat roof.	

== See also ==
- Buildings and architecture of Brighton and Hove
- List of conservation areas in Brighton and Hove
- Media related to Grade I listed buildings in Brighton and Hove at Wikimedia Commons
