= Geoffrey Seaton =

English cricketer and British Army officer (1926–2020)

Personal information
- Full name: Geoffrey Stuart Seaton
- Born: 6 March 1926; Brighton, Sussex, England
- Died: 18 November 2020 (aged 94); West Sussex, England
- Batting: Right-handed
- Bowling: Slow left-arm orthodox

Domestic team information
- Years: Team
- 1946–1947: Cambridge University
- 1957: Oxford University

Career statistics
Competition	First-class
Matches	8
Runs scored	196
Batting average	15.07
100s/50s	–/1
Top score	51
Catches/stumpings	6/–
- Source: Cricinfo, 30 June 2020

Geoffrey Stuart Seaton (6 March 1926 – 18 November 2020) was an English first-class cricketer and British Army officer.

Seaton was born at Kemp Town in Brighton on 6 March 1926. He attended Denstone College in Staffordshire before going up to Peterhouse, Cambridge. He played first-class cricket for Cambridge University in 1946 and 1947, making five appearances. He scored 123 runs in his five matches, averaging 17.57 and with a high score of 51.

After graduating from Cambridge, Seaton was commissioned into the British Army as a second lieutenant in the Royal Engineers, with promotion to lieutenant in January 1950. He was promoted to captain in January 1954.

While serving in the army, Seaton studied at Merton College, Oxford, in 1956 and 1957 on the Army Geodesy Course. He made a further three appearances in first-class cricket for Oxford University in 1957, scoring 73 runs with a high score of 26. He was promoted to major in January 1961, and retired from active service in January 1962.

Seaton died in West Sussex on 18 November 2020, at the age of 94.
