= Embassy Court =

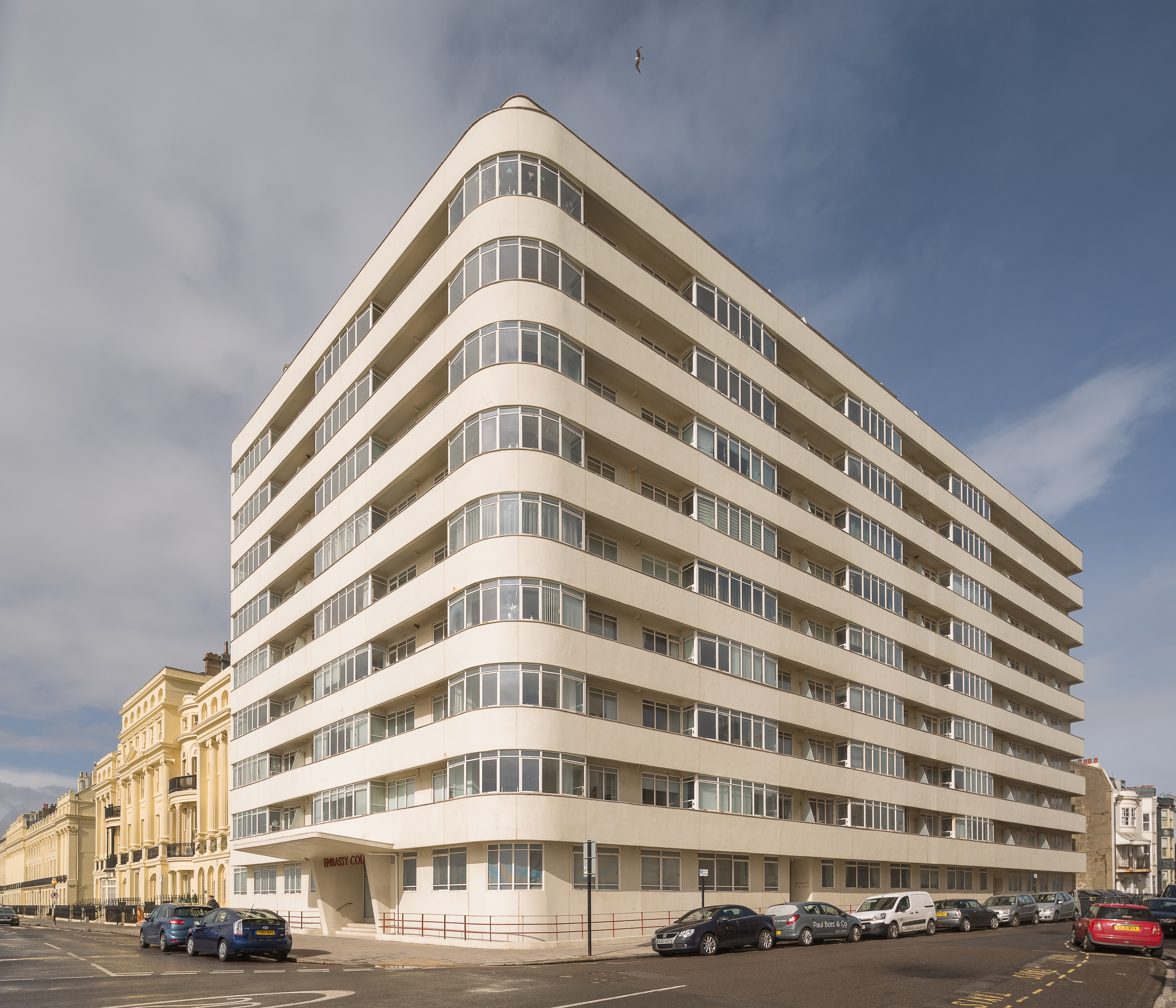
- Embassy Court seen from the southeast

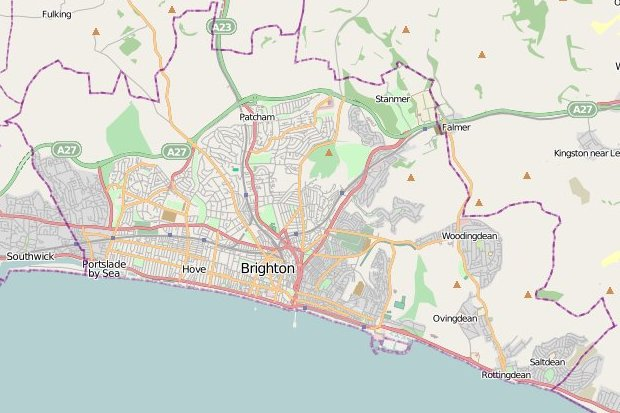
- Location within Brighton and Hove
- 50.8230°N 0.1564°W
- Location: Kings Road, Brighton BN1 2PY, Brighton and Hove, East Sussex, United Kingdom

History
- Built: 1934–35
- Built for: Maddox Properties

Site notes
- Height: 110 feet (34 m)
- Architect: Wells Coates
- Architectural style: Art Deco/Modernist
- Restored: 2004–05
- Restored by: Conran and Partners; Makers Ltd
- Owner: Bluestorm Ltd

Listed Building – Grade II*
- Official name: Embassy Court
- Designated: 19 July 1984
- Reference no.: 1381645

Embassy Court is an 11-storey block of flats on the seafront in Brighton, part of the English city of Brighton and Hove. It has been listed at Grade II* by English Heritage. Wells Coates' "extremely controversial" piece of Modernist architecture has "divided opinion across the city" since its completion in 1935, and continues to generate strong feelings among residents, architectural historians and conservationists.

The flats were originally let at high rents to wealthy residents, including Max Miller, Rex Harrison and Terence Rattigan, and features such as enclosed balconies and England's first penthouse suites made the 72-apartment, 11-storey building "one of the most desirable and sought-after addresses in Brighton and Hove". Its fortunes changed dramatically from the 1970s, though, as a succession of complex court cases set leaseholders, freeholders and landlords against each other while the building rotted. By the start of the 21st century it was an "embarrassing eyesore" which was close to being demolished, despite its listed status. Proposals to refurbish the block came to nothing until the court cases concluded in 2004 and Sir Terence Conran's architectural practice was brought in. With an investment of £5 million, raised entirely by the residents, Embassy Court was overhauled: by 2006 it had been restored to its original status as a high-class residence, in contrast to its poor late-20th-century reputation. Works to maintain the fabric of the building and prevent damage from the prevailing weather have continued since 2006.

== History ==
At the junction of Western Street and Kings Road on Brighton seafront, just on the Brighton side of the ancient parish boundary between Brighton and Hove, stood a 19th-century villa called Western House. Owners included Waldorf Astor, 2nd Viscount Astor and the drag king Vesta Tilley. In 1930 the site was chosen for redevelopment and the building and its grounds were demolished. Nothing took its place immediately, though, except for a temporary racetrack and miniature golf course. Developers Maddox Properties acquired the site and in 1934 enlisted Wells Coates, a Modernist architect responsible for the striking Isokon building in London earlier that year, to design a block of luxury flats as a speculative development.

Embassy Court was completed in 1935. Its reinforced concrete structure and steel-framed doors and windows were distinctive features, and other facilities included a ground-floor bank, partly enclosed balconies to every one of the 72 flats, and England's first penthouse suites. These occupied the top (11th) floor; the other ten storeys had seven flats each. Each flat was "all-electric", including the space heating in the form of ceiling panels. A constant hot water supply was achieved by generating and storing it in a thermal energy storage system in the basement. Coates commented: "Old ideas have been discarded and a new building has arisen to greet a new age that thinks of happiness in terms of health".

The building's height and bold appearance, "something like a great ocean liner", contrasted with the Regency-style terraces to the east, west and north—in particular the 110-year-old "palace-fronted terraces" of Brunswick Terrace, "as grand as anything in St Petersburg", and the monumental Brunswick Square behind it. It received much praise at first: a 1936 edition of the Architects' Journal claimed that the building "thrill[ed] one to the marrow", and Alderman Sir Herbert Carden, "the maker of modern Brighton" who was responsible for many interwar improvements in the Borough of Brighton, was so taken with its Modernist style that he campaigned for every other building along the seafront to be demolished and replaced with Embassy Court-style housing, all the way from Hove to Kemp Town. Writing in 1935, in a piece accompanied by a large illustration of Embassy Court-style buildings along Kings Road, he wrote "Embassy Court ... has shown us the way to build for the new age. Along our waterfront new buildings such as this must come". This "pre-war indifference to the historic fabric of the town" resulted in the first of many local conservation societies, the Regency Society, being formed, and prompted a greater appreciation of Brighton's 19th-century architectural heritage.

All 72 flats were initially rented out rather than sold to owner-occupiers. Rents varied between £150 and £500 per year—expensive for that time, and similar to the cost of a house in Brighton. The ground-floor bank branch lasted until February 1948, when it was converted into a restaurant; this was only in use for five years. Major renovations were then carried out in the 1960s: new doors, windows and lifts were installed.

The building's high-class status declined from the 1970s when the freehold changed hands frequently and many flats were acquired by absentee landlords. Many leaseholders built up long-term rent arrears, and lack of clarity over ownership made raising money for refurbishment difficult. Embassy Court gradually fell into disrepair. The freeholder until 1997 was a company called Portvale Ltd (a subsidiary company of Portvale Holdings Ltd) that was put into liquidation when a court case resulted in a demand to spend £1.5 million on maintenance. The Crown Estate Commissioners then took possession of the freehold, but Embassy Court's leaseholders established a company, Bluestorm Ltd, to buy it; this was achieved after another court case.

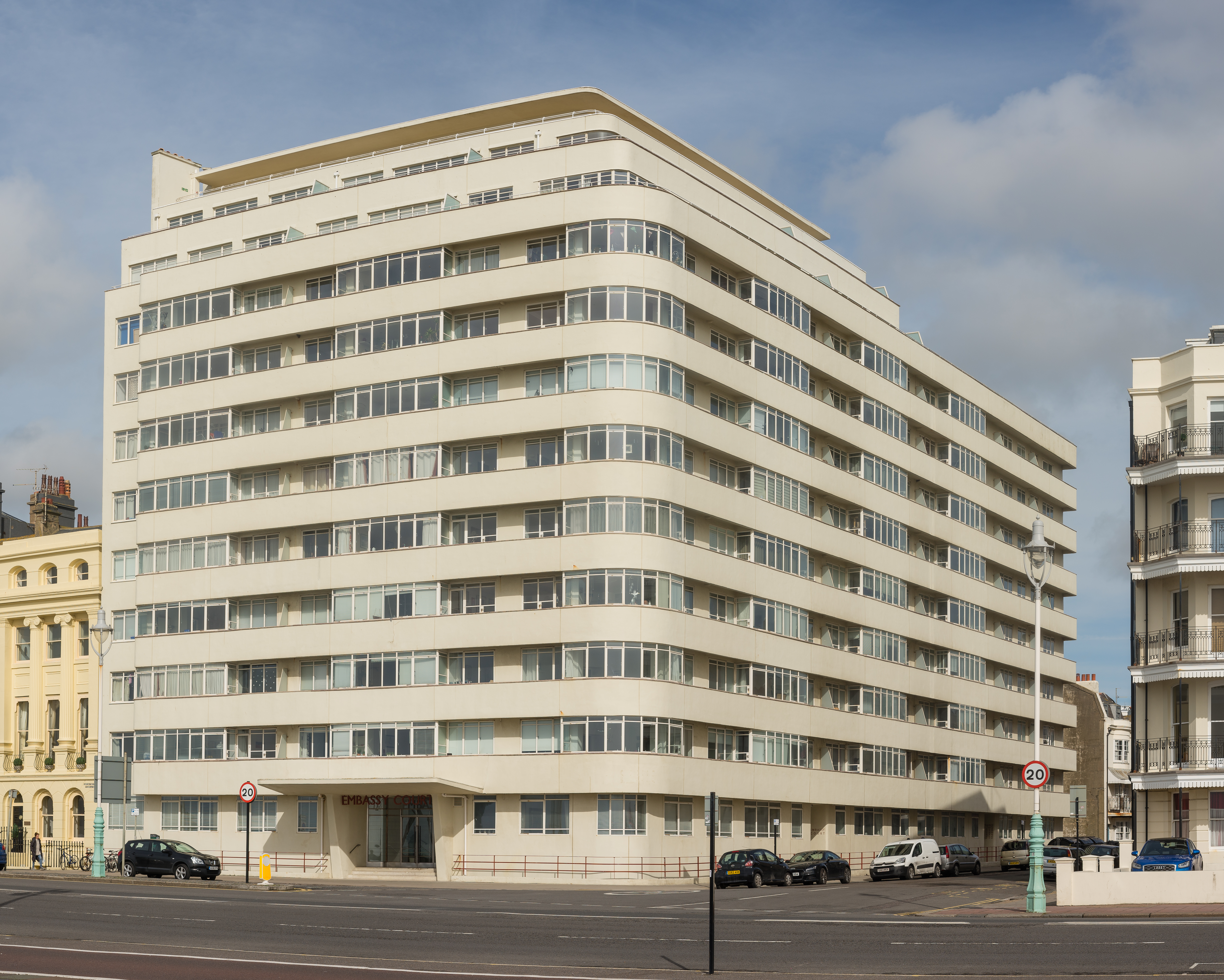
The curved corner, recessed upper storeys and restored cream render are visible in this 2017 view.

The first plans for refurbishing the building were announced in April 1998. The leaseholders' association commissioned local architects Alan Phillips and Matthew Lloyd to undertake design work and Ove Arup and Partners for their structural engineering expertise. Work was expected to cost £3 million to £4 million, of which a grant from the Government's Single Regeneration Budget would have covered £1.4 million. The project depended on the Sanctuary Housing Association acquiring the leases to 26 flats and the Crown Estate Commissioners transferring ownership of the freehold to the leaseholders' association. The proposed work was described as a "complete refurbishment" and would have lasted until 2000.

No action was taken, though, and the building continued to deteriorate. Architect Alan Phillips, who had continued his association with the building during the "impasse in negotiations" which had characterised the previous three years, described Embassy Court as being "on the cusp between demolition and renovation" at a debate in November 2001, at which he announced a new plan to convert the lower storeys into a hotel. Money generated by this could then be used to improve the upper storeys, which would remain residential. The nearby Bedford Hotel provided a model of a mixed-use tower block with hotel accommodation below residential flats.

Another court case began in November 2002. Bluestorm and Portvale Holdings (Note: Not the same company as the Portvale which had gone into liquidation in 1997. Portvale was a subsidiary of Portvale Holdings.) made claims against each other in relation to paying for the building's restoration. By this stage Bluestorm estimated the cost of a full refurbishment would be £4.5 million. Portvale Holdings stated it intended to sell the flats it owned, and a former director of the liquidated Portvale company later stated he did not wish to buy the freehold back from Bluestorm. The case was adjourned after two weeks and was decided in March 2003 in favour of Bluestorm. The chairman of Brighton and Hove City Council said he "welcomed the decision". Portvale Holdings appealed against the decision in February 2004, but a judge at the Royal Courts of Justice upheld the original verdict. This brought to a conclusion a long and complex period of legal action; the judge observed that the ongoing battles between leaseholders, landlords and freeholders had been "more suited to a nursery school playground".

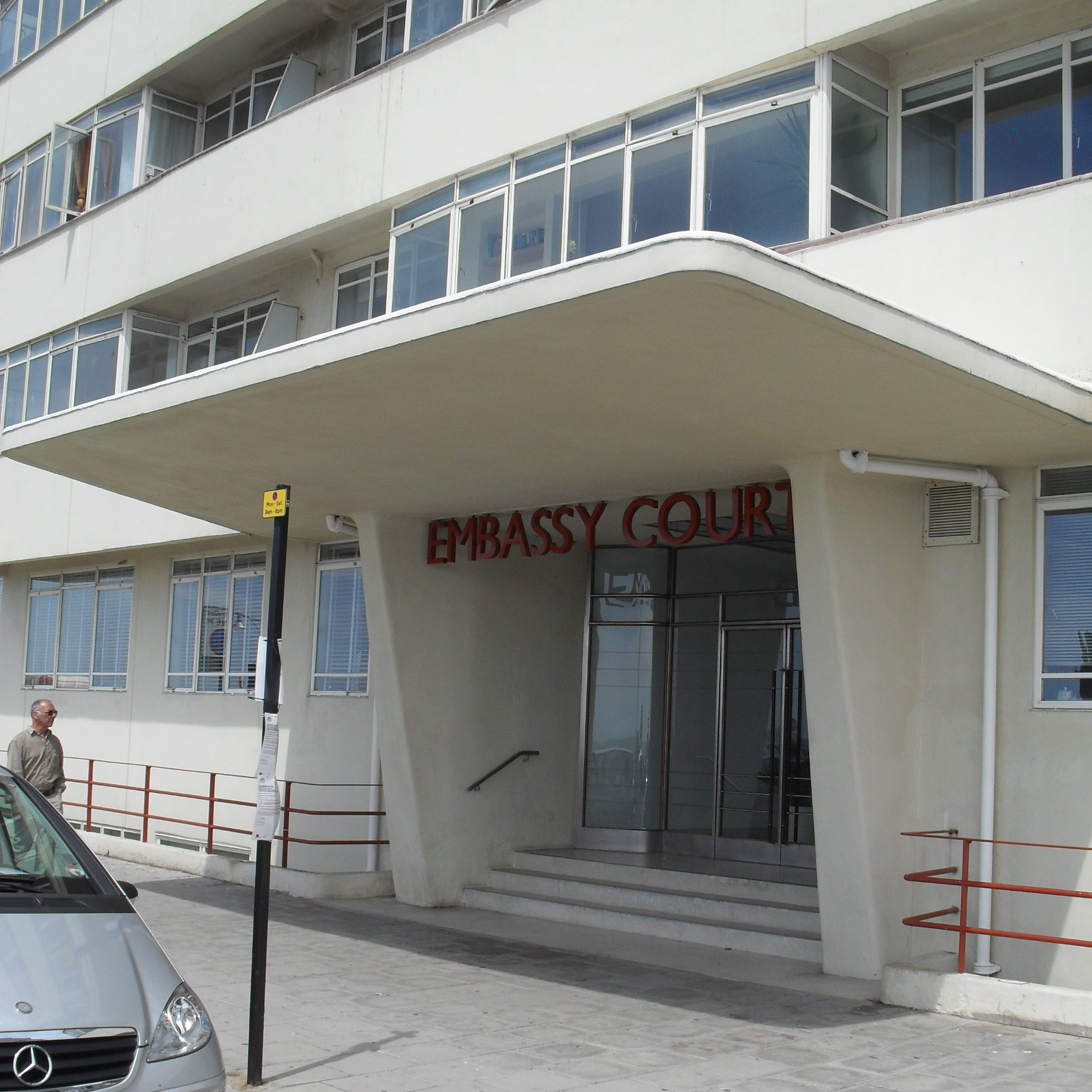
The original appearance of the entrance was restored during the 2004–06 renovation work.

In July 2003, Bluestorm announced a new refurbishment plan, this time involving Sir Terence Conran's Conran Group architectural consultancy. The scheme architect was Paul Zara. Conran Group undertook a structural survey which showed that the concrete walls had not deteriorated as badly as expected: its director said that the building was in "a very poor state [but] perfectly salvageable". The expected cost was £5 million, and various sources of funding were proposed: money received from Portvale Holdings and from the leaseholders was to be used alongside National Lottery and European Union regeneration grants for which Bluestorm would apply. No grants or Lottery funding were ever received. Also commissioned alongside Conran Group were structural engineering firm F.J. Samuely, whose founder Felix Samuely had worked on the building originally, and some other specialist companies. By September 2003, Conran had assembled a working group of engineers, designers and other professionals, and the plans included provision of a swimming pool and public facilities such as a restaurant, museum and art gallery by making use of underused areas of the building.

Work began in December 2003. First, the communal areas and lobby were deep-cleaned and exterior hoardings were put up; other early priorities included new electrical and heating systems. The overall timescale of the project was stated to be three years. At that time, the leaseholders were told they would have to fund the entire £5 million estimated cost themselves: some would have to pay around £100,000+ each. Also, the project leader indicated that the planned swimming pool, art gallery and other new features would be "put on hold until 2007". By February 2004, the bulk of the work was expected to start in summer 2004. Bluestorm raised a planning application, and Brighton and Hove City Council granted outline permission in June 2004. New windows, doors, plumbing and heating, repairs to the concrete structure and re-rendering the exterior were all prioritised at this time.

The first part of the refurbishment project was completed on time and on budget. After a delay caused by poor weather, the exterior hoardings and scaffolding were removed in early April 2005 to reveal new windows and a "smart cream concrete façade". The second phase involved repairs at the rear, the promised replacement plumbing and heating systems, new lifts and new front doors, and was due to finish in September 2005. The longer-term proposal for a basement swimming pool remained, and other ideas suggested at this time included a gymnasium, reinstatement of the original 1930s foyer decor including a mural by Edward McKnight Kauffer, and the conversion of one flat into a 1930s-style showpiece. Bluestorm organised a party on the Brunswick Lawns outside Embassy Court in September 2006 to celebrate the completion of the work. Local record label Skint Records led a separate private party on the top floor of the building. Public tours were also conducted later in the month. The earlier problems of poor security had been overcome, and Embassy Court was no longer "a haven for drunks, drug addicts and homeless people".

The building has since undergone further refurbishments in 2013 and 2024-26 to maintain the fabric and prevent a repeat of the deterioration in the 1990s. The building is run by volunteer directors of the leaseholder-owned freehold company. In 2025 Embassy Court marked the celebration of its 90th anniversary with a party.

== Architecture and facilities ==
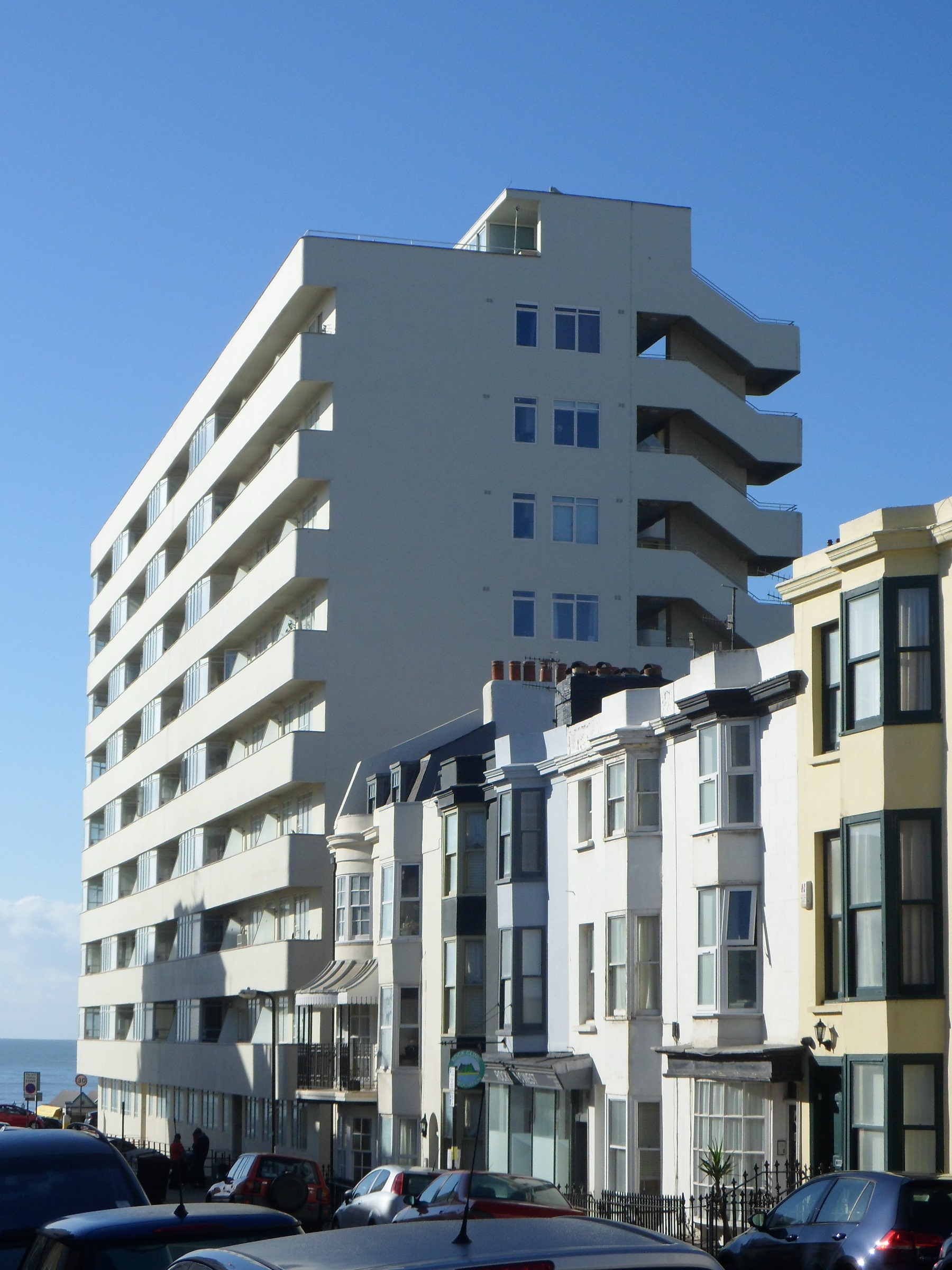
Embassy Court has strong horizontal lines and sweeping diagonal staircases to the rear.

Embassy Court represented a transition from the pure Art Deco style which had been popular in the early 1930s, towards a "simplistic and plain" interpretation of Modernism. In this respect it is similar to the Grand Ocean Hotel at nearby Saltdean; and the style appears again further west in Hove, albeit in brick, in the form of the mansion block at 4 Grand Avenue and the "severely Moderne" Viceroy Lodge. The Pevsner Architectural Guides describe Embassy Court as "Brighton's most prominent example of early Modernism at its most polished". There are similarities with Coates' Isokon building, but on a larger scale and in a more "nautical, streamlined" style. Coates was influenced by the designs of architect Erich Mendelsohn during a visit to Germany in 1931–32, and some of the building's design features recall Mendelsohn's work.

The building is 110 feet (34 m) tall, 75 feet (23 m) wide and rises to 11 storeys. Reinforced concrete painted a pale cream colour is the main building material. It is l-shaped but with a distinctively curved southeastern corner. The east (Western Street) façade is longer. Both faces (towards Kings Road and towards Western Street) have a strongly horizontal emphasis formed by the continuous bands of cantilevered balconies on each floor. The horizontal emphasis is partly offset by the "nice vertical rhythm" of the slightly curving windows of the sun rooms; this effect is most noticeable on the east elevation. The cream-coloured render was lost for many years because of the building's deteriorating condition, but it was restored during the Conran Partners' work and the exterior now looks as it did in the 1930s.

To the rear, the cantilevered effect is maintained, forming "access decks" which sweep diagonally upwards at the ends to house the external staircases. The lift shafts also punctuate the mostly horizontal tiers. The upper storeys (from ninth floor level upwards) are slightly recessed; the architectural theory of contextualism would suggest that this device would have been more effective had it started at fifth-floor level, matching the height of neighbouring Brunswick Terrace.

Embassy Court was the first building in England to feature penthouse suites. Other pioneering features included open-fronted balconies, lock-up garages and what the original managing agents Dudley Samuel and Harrison described as "sun-admitting Vista-Glass sun parlours". Many of the "sun rooms" have been integrated into the flats to create extra living space. Another unique feature was a mural by Edward McKnight Kauffer in the foyer. It was created by a new method in which a series of black-and-white photographs were printed on a light-sensitive cellulose surface. The flats had built-in steel-framed tubular furniture (manufactured by Pel Ltd) and woodwork by D. Burkle & Son.

== Reception and legacy ==
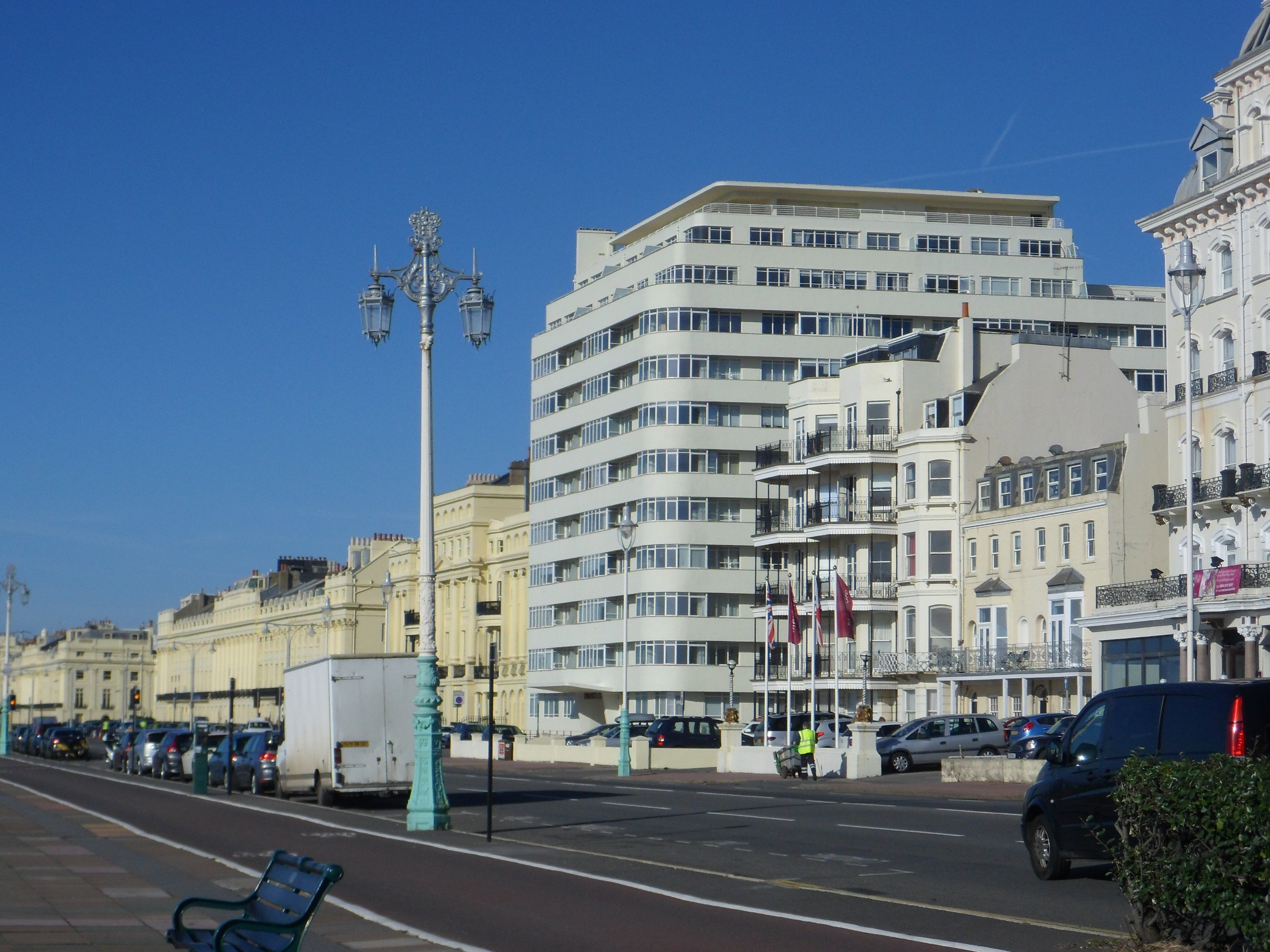
Embassy Court's bulk and stark Modernist style have led to criticism that it is a "bad neighbour" to the Regency buildings of neighbouring Brunswick Town.

Embassy Court has been a controversial building and "has divided opinion across the city" since it was built. "Unashamedly modern and different" from its surroundings, it was "the first challenge to the Georgian[-era] architecture of Brighton". Architectural historians Antony Dale and Nikolaus Pevsner both observed that Embassy Court is "a good building in the wrong place", in relation to its position adjoining the Brunswick Town development. Dale noted that the latter's "carefully regulated proportions" are overpowered by the unsympathetic form of its 11-storey neighbour, making Embassy Court "a glaring example of architectural bad manners and worse town planning". Nevertheless, he described it as "a good building of its period" and compared favourably with most blocks of flats built subsequently.

Pevsner called Embassy Court "a good and historically interesting" building", "well designed in itself"—but criticised it as acting as a "bad neighbour" to the "serious Neoclassical [architecture]" of Brunswick Town. Likewise, Brighton historian Clifford Musgrave contrasted Embassy Court with its near-contemporary, Marine Gate, to the east beyond Kemp Town; although it was "another white concrete block of flats", he considered it more elegant and better because it did not intrude directly on any 19th-century architectural set-pieces. It is an example of early Modernist architecture in England, and "one of the very few [such buildings] in the Sussex area". Former Mayor of Brighton Lord Lewis Cohen said in 1953: "It stands as a monument for all time to the lack of foresight of those who permitted such a conglomeration of architecture on our seafront."

Embassy Court was Brighton's first tower block. Although "it seemed to some that the era of skyscrapers had started" locally—especially in the light of Herbert Carden's proposals for the seafront—it was only in the 1960s that multi-storey towers began to dominate the skyline of Brighton and Hove. Journalist Adam Trimingham has commented that these postwar buildings have been characteristically "drab" and that "nothing was built to match Embassy Court".

By the start of the 21st century, public perception of Embassy Court was particularly poor: it was considered to be an "embarrassing eyesore", "a filthy blot on the seafront", a "grimy, rotting structure" and "like something from the Third World". Windows were falling out; wind, damp and noise were constant problems; and on one occasion some exterior cladding fell off and landed in the street. The third edition of The Cheeky Guide to Brighton, published in 2003, claimed Embassy Court looked like "Michael Jackson's face on a bad day". Meanwhile, the views articulated by Pevsner continued to find support. Writing in 2002, Anthony Seldon condemned both Embassy Court for "dwarf[ing] and insult[ing] its neighbours" and Herbert Carden for considering it "the ideal seafront building". Although Seldon placed it in his list of "the city's ten best 20th-century buildings"—describing it as "elegant", "vibrant and visually exciting"—and compared it favourably to the contemporary Marine Gate flats further along the seafront, he observed that it was "utterly out of place on the seafront" and should have been lower by three storeys. Furthermore, in a section consisting of ideas for the future of Brighton and Hove, he suggested "knock[ing] down Embassy Court, Hilton West Pier (Note: The present name of the Bedford Hotel.) and other excrescences along the seafront [and] hold[ing] a series of parties to celebrate"—recalling the demolition campaigns seen in some Mallorcan seaside resorts.

Embassy Court is a popular site for photographers and film-makers. The 2005 fantasy film MirrorMask was filmed partly at Embassy Court. An episode of local author Peter James's Grace was filmed in 2022 and in 2025 it featured in Nick Cave's The Death of Bunny Munro starring Matt Smith.

Embassy Court was listed at Grade II* on 19 July 1984. As of February 2001, it was one of 70 Grade II*-listed buildings and structures, and 1,218 listed buildings of all grades, in the city of Brighton and Hove.

== Notable residents ==
Keith Waterhouse moved into the building in 1983 and occupied a ninth-floor flat, but left in 1992 and moved to Bath. He drew comparison between Embassy Court and "an East End slum". Brighton-born comedian Max Miller and actor Rex Harrison were two early residents; Sir Terence Rattigan rented a flat there as well from 1960, but disliked it and soon moved to Marine Parade. Brighton-born Jason Rodriques moved into the building in 1987 for 22 years. Singer Alma Cogan was resident in the 1970s.

== See also ==
- Grade II* listed buildings in Brighton and Hove

== Bibliography ==
- Antram, Nicholas; Morrice, Richard (2008). Brighton and Hove. Pevsner Architectural Guides. London: Yale University Press. ISBN 978-0-300-12661-7.
- Arscott, David (2009). Brighton: A Very Peculiar History. Brighton: The Salariya Book Co. Ltd. ISBN 978-1-906714-89-5.
- Beevers, David; Roles, John (1993). A Pictorial History of Brighton. Derby: The Breedon Books Publishing Co. Ltd. ISBN 1-873626-54-1.
- Brighton Polytechnic. School of Architecture and Interior Design (1987). A Guide to the Buildings of Brighton. Macclesfield: McMillan Martin. ISBN 1-869-86503-0.
- Collis, Rose (2010). The New Encyclopaedia of Brighton. (based on the original by Tim Carder) (1st ed.). Brighton: Brighton & Hove Libraries. ISBN 978-0-9564664-0-2.
- Dale, Antony (1986) [1951]. About Brighton: A Guide to the Buildings and Byways of Brighton and Hove (2nd Revised ed.). Brighton: The Regency Society of Brighton and Hove.
- Musgrave, Clifford (1981). Life in Brighton. Rochester: Rochester Press. ISBN 0-571-09285-3.
- Nairn, Ian; Pevsner, Nikolaus (1965). The Buildings of England: Sussex. Harmondsworth: Penguin Books. ISBN 0-14-071028-0.
- Seldon, Anthony (2002). Brave New City: Brighton & Hove Past, Present, Future. Lewes: Pomegranate Press. ISBN 0-9542587-1-1.
- Underwood, Eric (1978). Brighton. London: B.T. Batsford Ltd. ISBN 0-7134-0895-2.
