= Danny Sheldon =

Danny Sheldon was mayor of Brighton and Hove in 1974.

Sheldon's parents came to Brighton from Wales during the Great Depression. They had two children: Danny and his brother Bill Sheldon, both of whom entered politics, Danny as a Conservative and Bill in the Labour Party. Danny Sheldon represented King's Cliff ward in the Kemp Town council, where he oversaw the building of the Prince Regent swimming pool at a time when Brighton lacked public swimming facilities.

Sheldon became the first mayor of the new borough of Brighton after the local government reorganization in 1974. His passion for his town led to confrontations within the East Sussex County Council. He was deselected by the Conservative Party, and contested further elections as an independent at both the borough and county level.

Sheldon died of cancer in 1982 at age 64.
