= William Walker (RAF officer) =

Royal Air Force officer

- Born: 24 August 1913; Hampstead, London, England
- Died: 21 October 2012 (aged 99)
- Occupation: RAF Pilot
- Known for: Oldest surviving RAF pilot of the Battle of Britain

Flight Lieutenant William Louis Buchanan Walker, AE (24 August 1913 – 21 October 2012) was, at the time of his death, the oldest surviving pilot from the Battle of Britain. His poem "Our Wall" about the Battle of Britain is inscribed on a special plinth aside the Christopher Foxley-Norris Memorial Wall of the Battle of Britain Memorial, Capel-le-Ferne, Kent.

== Early life ==
Walker was born on 24 August 1913 in Hampstead, London. He was educated at Brighton College, a private school in Brighton, East Sussex. Following schooling, he followed his father into the brewing business. In 1931, he began as a pupil brewer at a brewery in Aylesbury, Buckinghamshire to learn the trade. In 1933, he moved to Ind Coope brewery in Burton upon Trent, Staffordshire.

== Military service ==
Walker joined the RAF Volunteer Reserve on 2 September 1938 as an Airman u/t Pilot. He then underwent pilot training at RAF Kidlington, Oxford, flying his first solo on 28 September. He was called up on 1 September 1939, the day World War II broke out. He was posted to 1 Initial Training Wing, Cambridge on 15 November. On 17 February 1940, he was posted to RAF Brize Norton, Oxfordshire to undergo officer training, where he joined 2 Flight Training School. On 18 June 1940, he was commissioned as a pilot officer on probation. He was given the service number 82662.

He was immediately posted to No. 616 Squadron RAF, who were based at RAF Leconfield, East Yorkshire and flew the Supermarine Spitfire. It was with 616 Squadron that he would fight in the Battle of Britain. On 15 August, the squadron was scrambled to intercept a Luftwaffe attack on the North of England. During this engagement, he flew on the wing of his section leader. The result of the action was a success for his squadron, with six enemy bombers shot down. On 19 August, the squadron moved to London and was based at RAF Kenley.

On the morning of 26 August 616 Squadron was scrambled to intercept 40 German bombers. Over Dover and Dungeness, they were engaged by Messerschmitt Bf 109 fighters as they climbed to attack the bombers. During this engagement, his plane was attacked by Werner Mölders, a leading German fighter ace. His Spitfire was hit from behind and the controls were shot away. With a bullet in his right ankle, he was forced to bail out of the plane at 20,000 ft. He landed in the English Channel and clung to a shipwreck on the Goodwin Sands. He was pulled from the water by a fishing boat, then transferred to an RAF Whaleback that brought him ashore at Ramsgate, Kent. As the local hospital was too damaged to treat his wounds, he was taken instead to the hospital at RAF Halton, Buckinghamshire. He would keep the armour-piercing bullet as a souvenir of his experience.

After six months recovering, he was posted to an aircraft ferry unit which would deliver new aircraft from their factories to the operational units. His commission was confirmed on 18 June 1941 and he was promoted to the war substantive rank of flying officer. He later transferred to No. 116 Squadron RAF, an anti-aircraft unit. On 18 June 1942, he was promoted to war substantive flight lieutenant. He was demobilised in September 1945.

As a member of The Few, he was awarded the 1939–45 Star with an additional Battle of Britain clasp.

On 24 August 1958, he was granted permission to retain the rank of flight lieutenant.

== Later life ==
After demobilisation, Walker returned to his pre-war career of brewing. He would go on to become the chairman of Ind Coope's brewery in Burton upon Trent, Staffordshire.

Upon retirement, Walker turned to poetry. He was also a strong supporter of the Battle of Britain Memorial Trust. He would attend the annual remembrance held at the Battle of Britain Memorial, Capel-le-Ferne, Kent. His poem 'Our Wall' was inscribed on the monument alongside the names of The Few in July 2010 as part of the 70th anniversary celebrations. He was featured in the 2011 documentary "Battle of Great Britain" hosted Ewan and Colin McGregor on the BBC.

Walker died on 21 October 2012, having suffered a stroke three days earlier.

== Personal life ==
In August 1941, Walker married Claudine Mawby, one of The Mawby Triplets. Together they had seven children, including Tim Walker a columnist for The Daily Telegraph. Two of the children pre-deceased their parents. They had legally separated but were not divorced before Claudine's death on 13 September 2012.
