= Sussex Square, Brighton =

Residential square in Brighton, England

Coordinates: 50.8169°N 0.1105°W

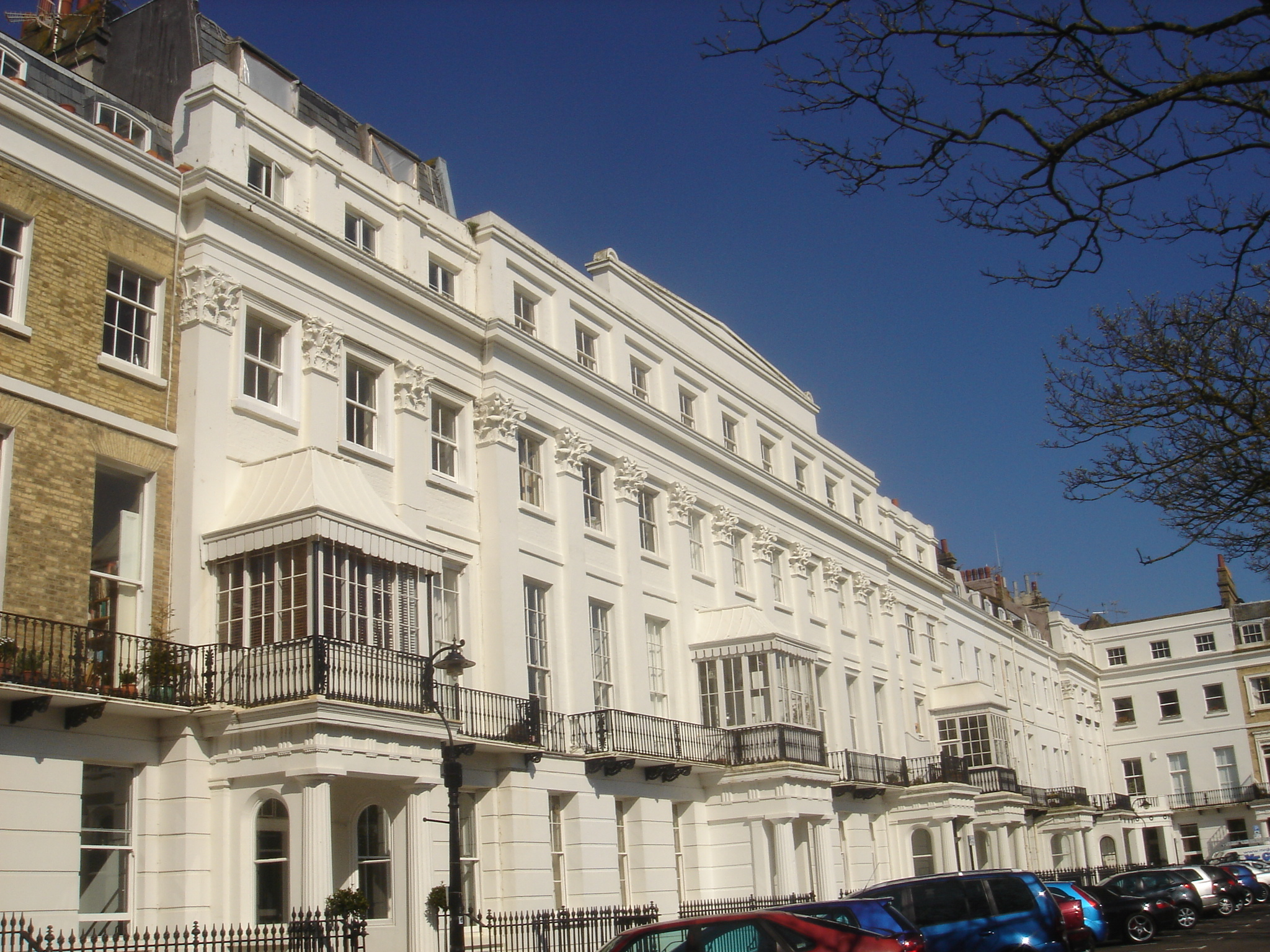
Northern end of the square

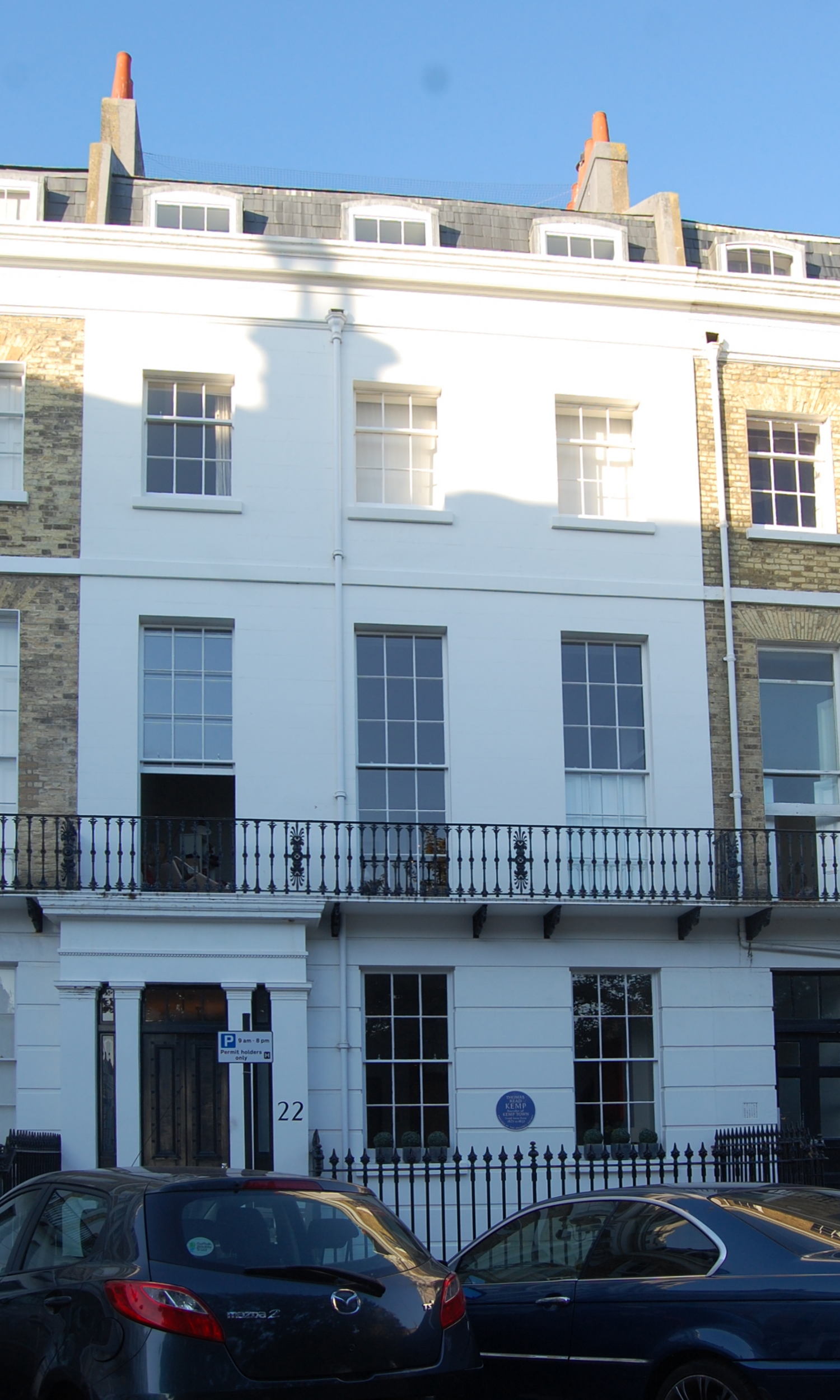
Former resident of Thomas Read Kemp, featuring a blue plaque

Sussex Square is a garden square in Brighton in East Sussex, England. It is located in the Kemp Town section of the city, noted for its Regency architecture. It is divided by Eastern Road which runs across it. At the southern end it becomes Lewes Crescent continuing on until it meets Marine Parade on the seafront. Arundel Terrace and Chichester Terrace lead off Lewes Crescent running east and west respectively. It has been noted as being larger than London's Grosvenor Square and with a wider span that the Royal Crescent in Bath. Many of its houses are now Grade I listed.

During the later years of the eighteenth century Brighton became a fashionable seaside resort and many new streets and squares were added, continuing during the Regency era with the new suburb of Kemp Town. Work started on Sussex Square and adjacent Lewes Crescent in 1823 and the facades of the houses were finished in 1828. The master builder Thomas Cubitt oversaw the construction.

Notable residents have included Thomas Read Kemp, the property developer behind the development of the square who gives his name to Kemp Town, Thomas Cubitt himself and Lord John Russell, Prime Minister during the Victorian era, all of whom are commemorated by blue plaques.

== See also ==
- Grade I listed buildings in Brighton and Hove

== Bibliography ==
- Antram, Nicholas & Pevsner, Nikolaus. Sussex East with Brighton and Hove. Yale University Press, 2013
- Avery, Derek. Georgian and Regency Architecture. Chaucer, 2003.
- Gilbert, Edmund William. Brighton, Old Ocean's Bauble. Flare Books, 1975.
- Hobhouse, Hermione. Thomas Cubitt: Master Builder. Macmillan, 1971.
- Musgrave, Clifford. Life in Brighton. The History Press, 2011.
- Wylson, Anthony. Aquatecture: Architecture and Water. Elsevier, 2013.
