= The Mawby Triplets =

- Born: Sylvia Angella Mawby; 20 August 1921; Claudine Mawby; Claudette Mawby; 10 August 1922
- Died: Claudette; 29 August 1942 (aged 20); Marine Gate, Brighton; Angella; 15 December 2000 (aged 79); Claudine; 13 September 2012 (aged 90)
- Occupation: Child actresses

The Mawby Triplets were three English child actors who starred in several films in Hollywood and in England during the 1920s and 1930s. While the three girls were sisters, they were not actually triplets. Angella Mawby was born on 20 August 1921 and her younger twin sisters Claudine and Claudette on 10 August 1922. The close resemblance of the three sisters, however, caused Hollywood to market them as triplets. The first film the girls starred in was The Baby Cyclone opposite actor Lew Cody, in 1928. In 1929, they appeared in two more films, Dance of the Paper Dolls and Broadway Melody with Bessie Love. In 1930, they appeared with Gloria Swanson in What a Widow!

Less frequently, the girls performed roles apart from one another, as when Angella appeared in the 1930 John Barrymore film The Man from Blankley's. The girls continued to appear in American films until 1932, when the Lindbergh kidnapping in conjunction with some kidnapping threats in anonymous letters sent to the Mawby family caused their parents to decide to return to England.

Once back, the three performed in a number of British films. The girls then performed on the British stage in several plays from 1936 until the outbreak of the Second World War. The war effectively ended their career as performers. On 29 August 1942, Claudette died, aged 20, when the flat she had moved into three days earlier at Marine Gate in Brighton was destroyed by a bomb during a German air raid of the city. Angella Mawby Carr died in December 2000, aged 79. Claudine Mawby married the Battle of Britain pilot William Walker and died on 13 September 2012, aged 90. She had seven children by him (including former The Daily Telegraph theatre critic and diarist Tim Walker), two of whom predeceased her. She was separated from her husband, who survived her by one month.

The girls' handprints are included at Grauman's Chinese Theatre in Hollywood.
