= Leonard Rome Guthrie =

Leonard Rome Guthrie (1880 in Glasgow – 1958 in Blyth, Suffolk) was a Scottish architect. His parents were the decorator John Guthrie and his wife Jessie Finlay Stark, Scots who had married in London in 1876 and would later return there. He joined the Wimperis & Simpson partnership in 1925 to form Wimperis, Simpson and Guthrie.

== Works ==
His works included:

- In 1912, Townhill Park House, Southampton. Italianate Gardens with planting schemes by Gertrude Jekyll.
- In 1913 he was appointed architect to the Royal Institution and masterminded its major reconstruction.
- Between 1926 and 1931, Grosvenor House, Park Lane London. The design was started by Guthrie but finished by Edwin Lutyens.
- In 1929, the University of London Observatory.
- In the 1930s, the BBC transmitter building at the Brookmans Park transmitting station near London, followed by others at Moorside Edge, Westerglen, Washford, Lisnagarvey, Burghead, Stagshaw, Start Point and Droitwich. These buildings had impressive Art Deco facades in Portland stone, and many of them survive. The Washford building is Grade II listed.
- In 1932, as part of the firm Wimperis, Simpson and Guthrie and with Maurice Bloom: Marine Gate, Brighton.
- In 1936, Winfield House, the Official Ambassadorial residence of the U.S. Ambassador to the United Kingdom.
