= Courtenay Gate =

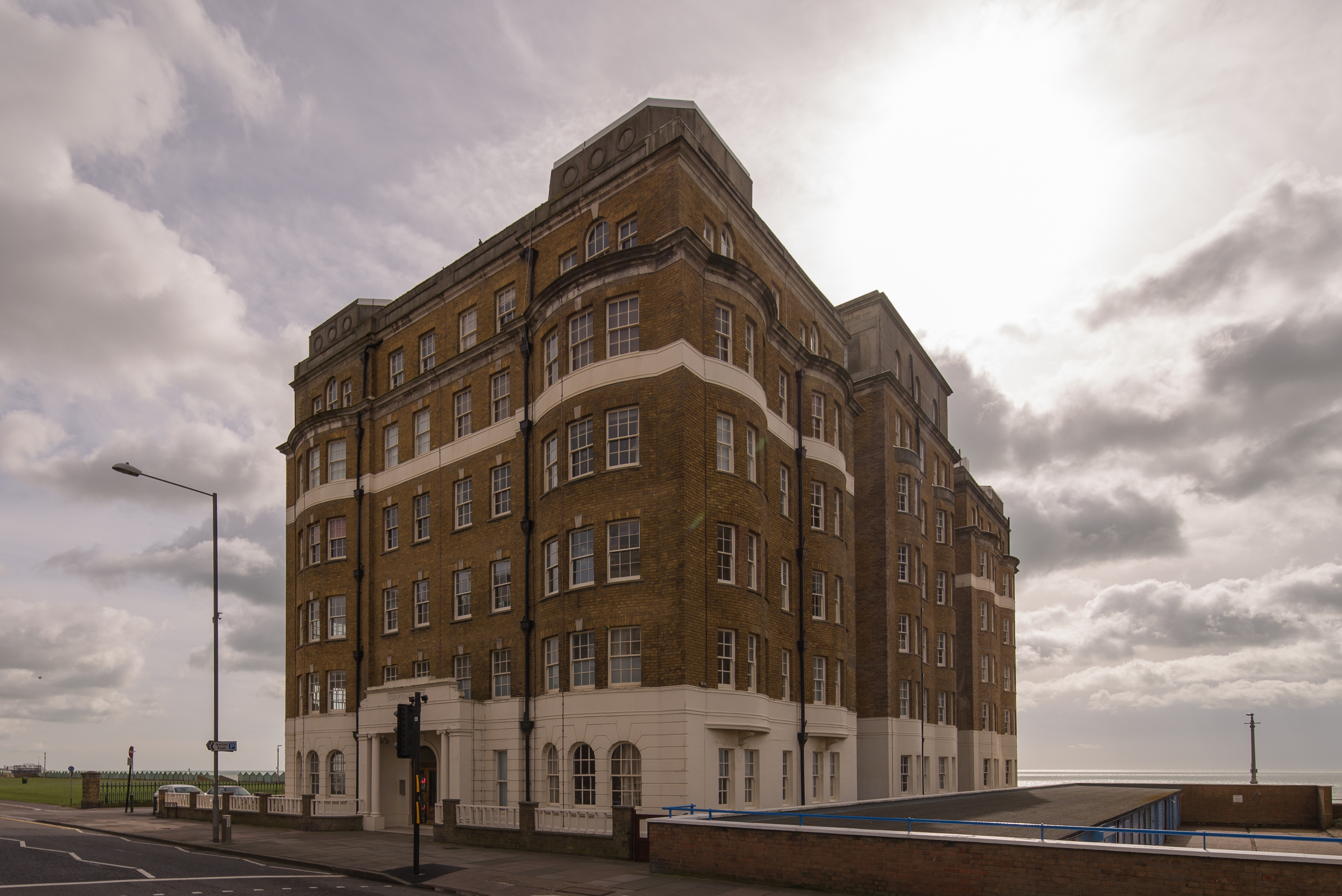
- Courtenay Gate from the northwest

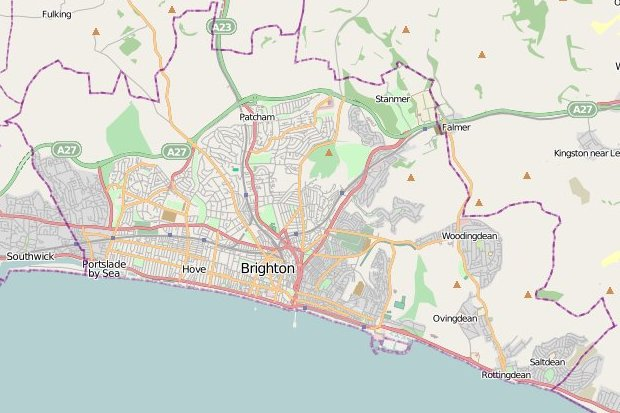
- Location within Brighton & Hove

General information
- Status: Completed
- Type: Serviced apartments
- Architectural style: Neo-Georgian
- Location: Kingsway, Hove BN3 2WJ, Brighton and Hove, England
- Coordinates: 50.8244°N 0.1725°W
- Completed: 1934

Technical details
- Floor count: 7

Design and construction
- Architecture firm: Coleridge, Jennings and Soimenow (J. D. Coleridge)

Courtenay Gate is a block of serviced apartments on the seafront in Hove, part of the English coastal city of Brighton and Hove. Situated in a prominent position next to the beach and overlooking Hove Lawns, the six-storey block is Neo-Georgian in style and dates from 1934. It is in a conservation area and is a locally listed building. Built to replace a terrace of early-19th-century houses which had been demolished more than 30 years earlier, the "imposing" gault brick building has a "palatial" appearance and is a landmark on the seafront.

== History ==
James Mills built a terrace of ten houses between Hove beach and the old road to Shoreham-by-Sea which ran along the seafront in the late 1820s. He named the development after himself and occupied 3 Mills Terrace until his death on 11 April 1846. His tomb is still visible at St Andrew's Church on Church Road. The properties had private gardens adjoining the beach, and were either owned by wealthy residents (including a baron, a private tutor, a priest and a shipbuilder) or were run as "respectable lodging houses". Mills Terrace was demolished in 1901 and the site remained empty until 1930 despite many plans for redevelopment. A block of flats was proposed in 1907; in 1916 three people bought the freehold of the land and claimed that building work was starting; and a concert hall was proposed and plans were drawn up. A miniature golf course was eventually laid out in 1930. In the meantime, Shoreham Road was renamed Kingsway in 1910 to commemorate King Edward VII, who regularly visited both Brighton and Hove.

Plans for a block of luxury flats on the site were displayed at Hove Museum in 1934 after being submitted to Hove Corporation. Surgeon and cinema pioneer Edmund Distin Maddick may have been involved in the early stages, but London-based architects Coleridge, Jennings and Soimenow drew up the designs. Construction was complete in 1934. The block had 32 flats across six floors and a penthouse at seventh-floor level. The name Courtenay Gate alluded to neighbouring Courtenay Terrace, a row of houses dating from the 1840s. These may have been named after Elizabeth Courtenay, wife of Lord Charles Somerset, who died in 1815 and has a memorial at St Andrew's Church. The first owner of the block was Maurice Bloom, the architect who in 1939 designed Marine Gate—another large block of luxury flats a few miles east at Black Rock on the edge of Brighton.

The Admiralty requisitioned the block during World War II, as with many buildings along the seafront in Brighton and Hove. In 1945, in the wake of a local housing crisis, Hove Corporation wanted to use the building to house poor families; the appeal went as far as the Ministry of Health, but was unsuccessful. Ownership then passed to the Norwich Union Group, which owned several blocks of flats in Hove. They sold it in November 1971, and over the next 14 months the block passed through three holding companies. The last of these, a London-based company, served notice on the tenants of the few remaining rented flats in 1974 and sold them on the open market with new leases. Selling prices at that time varied between £21,000 and £35,000; between 2005 and 2013, the average sale price of flats in Courtenay Gate had risen to approximately £360,000, compared to average sale prices for Hove as a whole of £275,000 (all properties) and £206,000 (flats and apartments).

Buster Lloyd-Jones, a celebrity veterinary practitioner, occupied the penthouse suite for about nine years until 1970. Its high, exposed position, regularly affected by storms, high winds and the sea frets common in Hove, "reminded him of living in a lighthouse". Another resident until his death in 1972 was Sir Albert Clavering, active in local politics in London before World War II, who later became a famous cattle breeder.

== Heritage ==
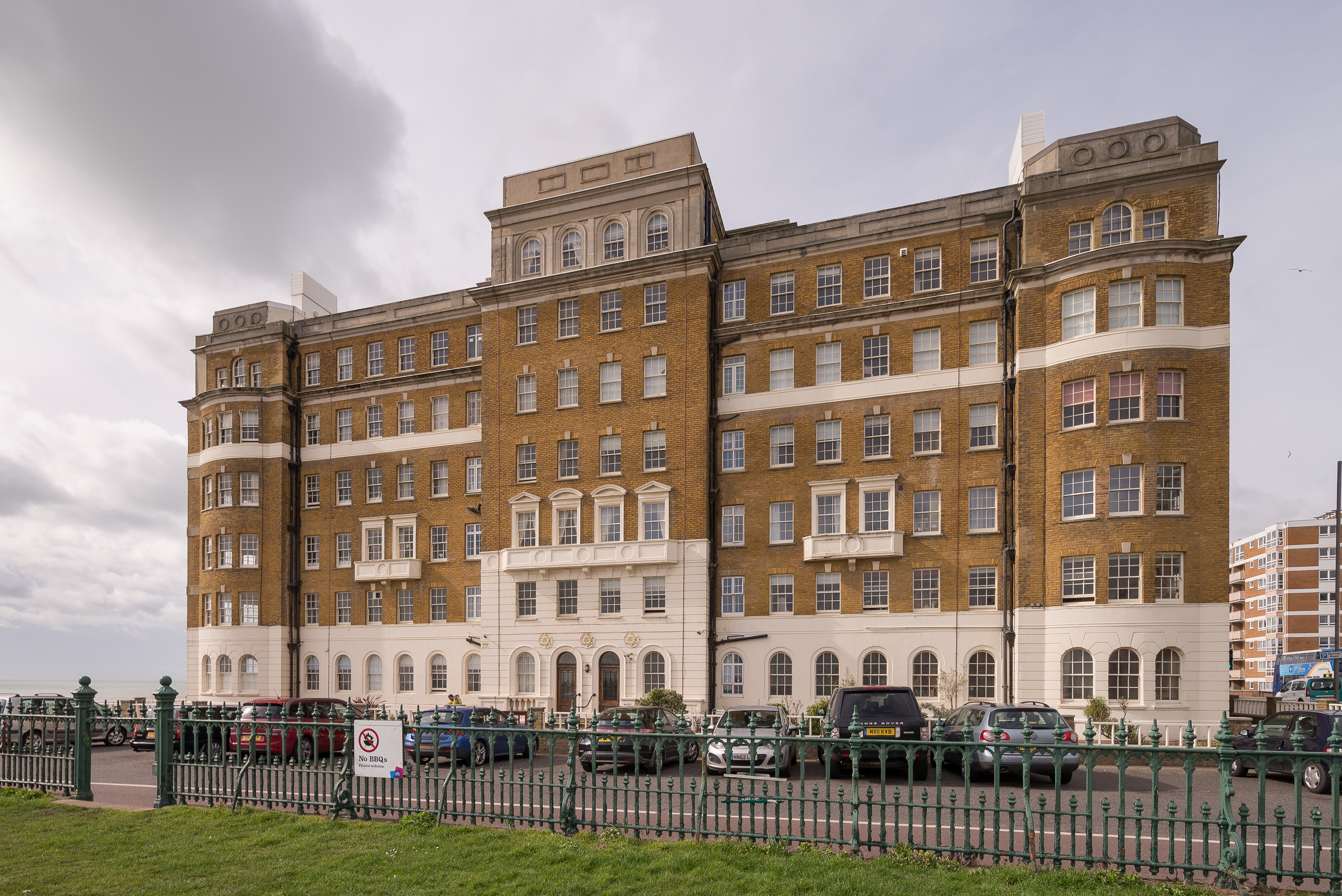
East facade.

Courtenay Gate is within The Avenues Conservation Area, one of 34 conservation areas in the city of Brighton and Hove. The 55.78-acre (22.57 ha) area was designated by Hove Council in 1985 and extended in 1989.

The block was included in Hove Borough Council's local list of heritage assets, which was adopted in December 1996. After Hove and Brighton amalgamated to form Brighton and Hove Borough (later City) Council, this list was combined with Brighton Borough's local list. Buildings with this designation are "identified as having a degree of significance meriting consideration in planning decisions, because of [their] heritage interest". The city council reassessed all locally listed buildings in 2015; Courtenay Gate was retained on the list. Hove Borough Council's assessment of the block stated that it was built to a "grand scale" with "palatial proportions [and] high quality detail". Its façade was said to resemble, albeit in a modern idiom, a palace.

== Architecture ==
Courtenay Gate was designed by the architectural firm of Coleridge, Jennings and Soimenow. The firm was based in Westminster in London and was a partnership between John Duke Coleridge, Paul Humphrey Coleridge, Frank Jennings and Michael Soimenow. It was dissolved in March 1935. They designed the building a year before that; it is therefore newer than most of the buildings along this stretch of Kingsway, the oldest of which date from the 1830s (there are also two newer blocks of flats and the King Alfred leisure centre, though). A "large four-square block of serviced apartments", its angles are softer and rounder than those of neighbouring Flag Court (1959), which therefore appears taller and bulkier. Courtenay Gate is Neo-Georgian in style; this architectural style was popular in the mid-20th century in Brighton and Hove, being especially prominent in the work of local architect John Leopold Denman.

The main building material is yellow gault brick, but the ground floor is rendered and rusticated and a wide band of render also separates the fourth and fifth storeys. Above the fifth storey runs a narrow band of stone, and the parapet (flanking the centrally placed seventh-storey penthouse suite) is also of stone. The use of gault brick helps it relate to the older buildings in the conservation area, even though its age, size and style do not conform to the typical pattern of the area: houses of up to four storeys with decorative exterior features, sash windows and large chimneys, mostly built in the 1870s and 1880s. The south and north elevations are curved outwards, and above the entrance on the north side is a "curious Art Nouveau-style plaster decoration" featuring stylised fleurs-de-lys, sunbursts and crowns. Further decorative plasterwork in the form of Tudor roses is visible on the east wall, which overlooks Hove Lawns. These expanses of grass, separated by paths leading from Kingsway to the beach, run westwards from the old boundary with Brighton as far as Courtenay Gate. In its position at the west end of the Lawns, Courtenay Gate "forms an imposing landmark".

== Bibliography ==
- Antram, Nicholas; Morrice, Richard (2008). Brighton and Hove. Pevsner Architectural Guides. London: Yale University Press. ISBN 978-0-300-12661-7.
- Middleton, Judy (2002). The Encyclopaedia of Hove & Portslade. Brighton: Brighton & Hove Libraries.
- Musgrave, Clifford (1981). Life in Brighton. Rochester: Rochester Press. ISBN 0-571-09285-3.
- Scott, Eddie (1995). Hove: A Pictorial History. Chichester: Phillimore & Co. ISBN 0-85033-981-2.
