= Wimperis, Simpson and Guthrie =

British architecture firm

Wimperis, Simpson & Guthrie were a firm of British architects based at 61, South Molton Street, London, W1, most active in the 1920s and 1930s. They were known for their design of buildings such as Fortnum and Mason on Piccadilly, the Cambridge Theatre, Marine Gate in Brighton and Winfield House.

== History ==
The founding partners were Edmund Wimperis, William Begg Simpson and Leonard Rome Guthrie, who joined the Wimperis & Simpson partnership in 1925.

== Projects ==
- 1925 Fortnum & Mason, London
- 1925 Dupplin Castle
- 1925-6 Beaumont Hotel, Mayfair, London
- 1926 Grosvenor House, Park Lane, London with consultant architect Edwin Landseer Lutyens
- 1929 Cambridge Theatre, West End, London
- 1932 Flats, Brook House site
- 1935 North Scottish Regional Broadcasting Station
- 1936 63 Harley Street, London
- 1936 Winfield House, London
- 1939 Marine Gate, Brighton

== Bibliography ==
- Brodie, Antonia (2001). British Architectural Library Directory of British Architects 1834–1914: L–Z. Vol. 2. London: Royal Institute of British Architects/Continuum. ISBN 0-8264-5514-X.
