= Winfield House =

Official residence of the US ambassador to the UK in London

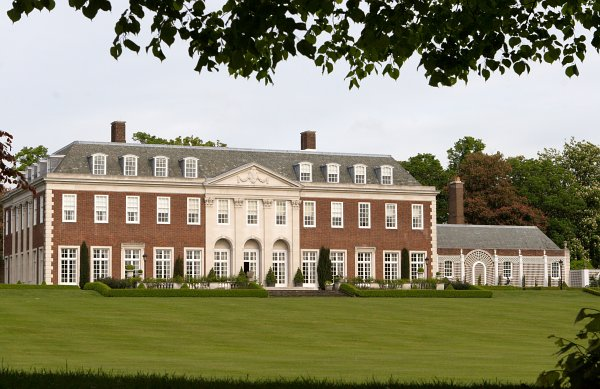
- The garden front in 2009
- Interactive map of the Winfield House area
- Former names: St Dunstan's

General information
- Architectural style: Neo-Georgian
- Location: Regent's Park; London, England
- Coordinates: 51.5308°N 0.1644°W
- Current tenants: US Ambassador to the UK and family (since 1955)
- Completed: c. 1936
- Client: Barbara Woolworth Hutton
- Owner: United States government

Design and construction
- Architect: Leonard Rome Guthrie
- Architecture firm: Wimperis, Simpson and Guthrie

Winfield House is an English townhouse in Regent's Park, central London and the official residence of the United States ambassador to the United Kingdom (formally, ambassador to the Court of St James's). The grounds are 12 acres (4.9 ha), the second largest private garden in London, after the Garden of Buckingham Palace.

The house was built for American heiress Barbara Woolworth Hutton in 1936 on the former Hertford–St. Dunstan estate that had been damaged by fire. During the Second World War, the estate was used by the Royal Air Force. Hutton donated it to the United States after the war, and since 1955 it has been the American ambassador's residence. The house is Grade II listed by Historic England as an "exceptional ambassador's residence and as a notable Neo-Georgian town house containing numerous features of note."

== Hertford Villa ==
The first house on the site was Hertford Villa, the largest of the eight villas originally constructed in Regent's Park, pursuant to the development scheme of John Nash. This house was designed by Decimus Burton in 1825 for Francis Seymour-Conway, 3rd Marquess of Hertford, who used it for orgies. Burton's creation was described as, 'decorated simplicity, such as the hand of taste, aided by the purse of wealth can alone execute'. Burton's design was subsequently refurbished with an updated exterior. Later, this Georgian style villa became known as 'St Dunstan's' because of the distinctive clock that hung in front of it, which was purchased by the art-collecting Marquess of Hertford when it was auctioned from the church of St Dunstan-in-the-West prior to the church's demolition in 1829–30 for a road-widening scheme.

Subsequent occupants who leased Hertford Villa–St. Dunstan's included American financier Otto Kahn and British newspaper proprietor Lord Rothermere. During the First World War, Kahn lent the house to a new charity for blinded servicemen, which took the name of St Dunstan's (now Blind Veterans UK). After a fire in 1936, the house and grounds were purchased by Barbara Hutton and the fire-damaged home was then demolished.

== Winfield House ==
Hutton commissioned a new mansion to be built in the Neo-Georgian style, which was designed by Leonard Rome Guthrie of the English architectural practice Wimperis, Simpson and Guthrie. The house was at first known by one of the names of its predecessor (St Dunstan's), but Lord Fraser of Lonsdale, head of the soldiers' charity, approached Hutton to explain that the similarity in the name and location of her house and his organisation (still with an office in Regent's Park) caused confusion, and he asked that she give up the historical name. She agreed to the request and chose a new name, derived from her grandfather Frank Winfield Woolworth, who had an estate, Winfield Hall, in Glen Cove, New York.

During the Second World War, the house was used by a Royal Air Force barrage balloon unit and as an officers' club. It was visited during the war by film actor Cary Grant, who was married to Hutton at the time. After the war, Hutton sold the house to the American government for a token sum, one dollar.

After extensive renovations, Winfield House became the ambassador's residence in 1955. The previous official residence at 14 Prince's Gate had been deemed inadequately secure. The house is listed on the U.S. Secretary of State's Register of Culturally Significant Property, which denotes properties owned by the U.S. State Department with particular cultural or historical significance. The interiors have undergone several alterations at various points, including in 1969 by William Haines, a decorator and former silent film star.

=== Grounds ===
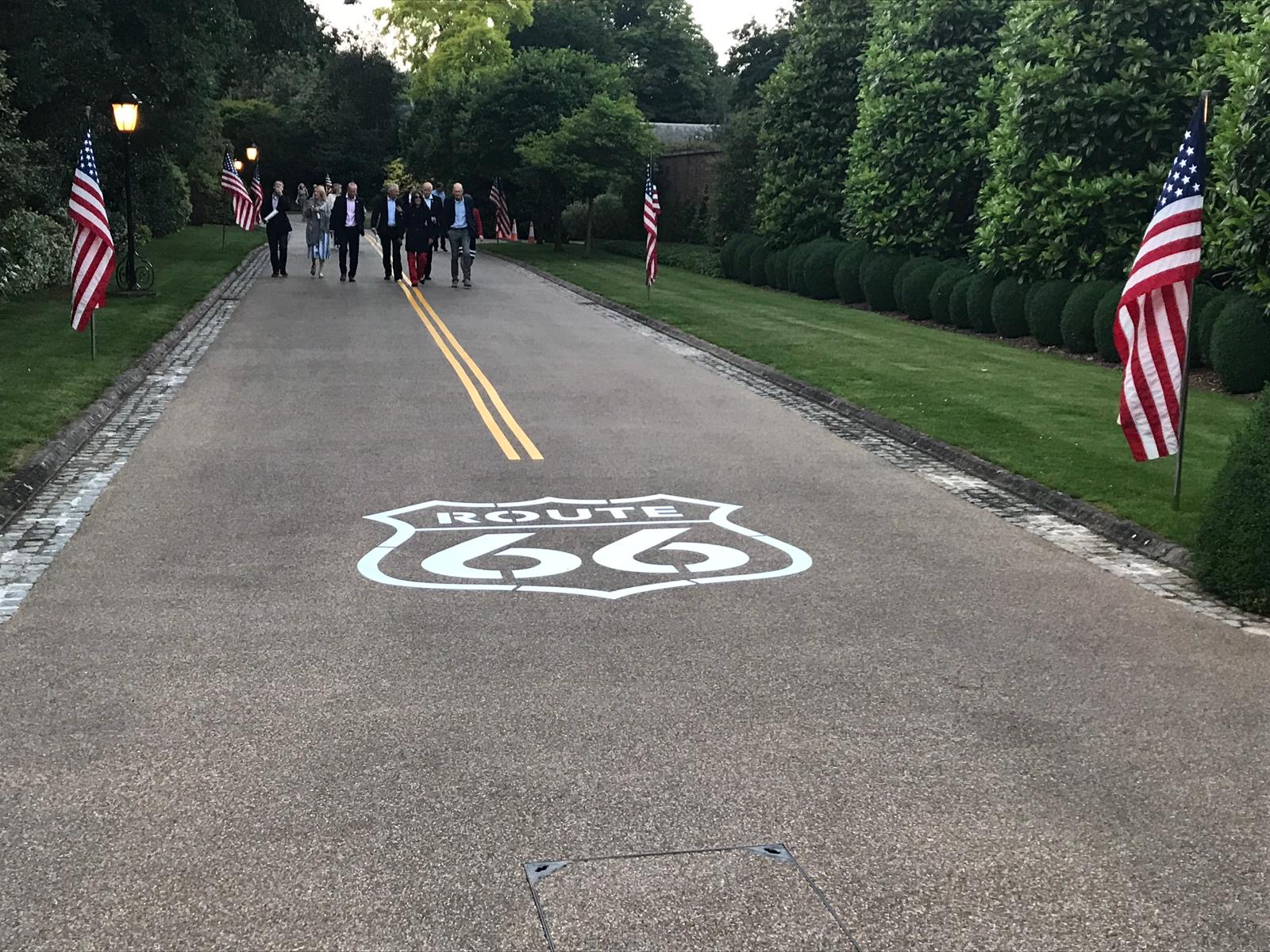
Route 66–themed drive connecting the rear grounds to the front entrance

Winfield House is situated within twelve acres of grounds set into Regent's Park, which includes a small front wood, sculpture garden, formal garden, vegetable garden, and a grass tennis court, and a greenhouse directly behind the court, as well as an extensive lawn for entertaining which comprises the majority of the acreage. Pathways and drives extend into the grounds, and connect the front garden and entrance to the rear. The property is surrounded by trees, primarily for security and privacy.

== See also ==
- List of structures in London
- United Kingdom – United States relations
- U.S. Embassy, London
- British Ambassador's residence in Washington, D.C., the British equivalent of Winfield House
- Deerfield Residence (Dublin), residence of the US ambassador to Ireland

== Bibliography ==
- Stourton, James (2012). Great Houses of London. London: Frances Lincoln. ISBN 978-0-7112-3366-9.
- Tuttle, Maria; Binney, Marcus (2008). Winfield House. London: Thames & Hudson. ISBN 978-0500976784.
