= Arundel Terrace =

Road in Brighton, England

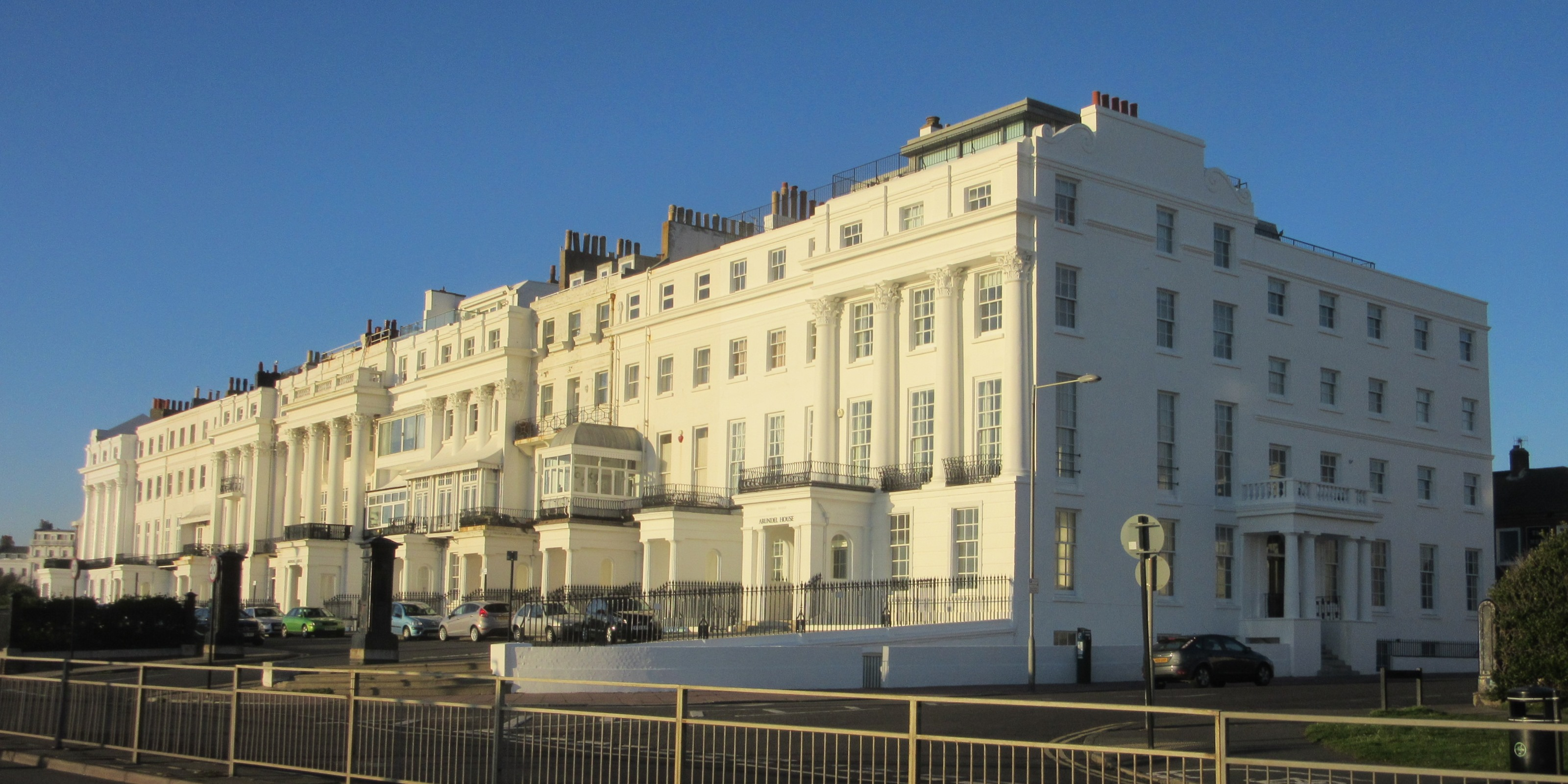
- The terrace seen from the southeast

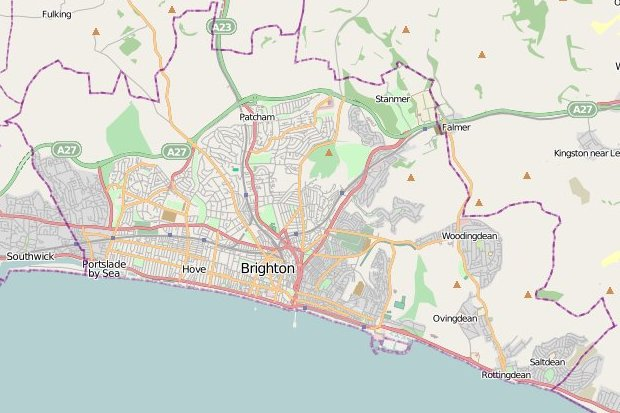
- Location within Brighton and Hove
- 50.8151°N 0.1091°W
- Location: 1–13 Arundel Terrace, Kemp Town, Brighton and Hove, United Kingdom

History
- Built: 1824–1828
- Built for: Thomas Read Kemp

Site notes
- Architect(s): Amon Wilds and Charles Busby
- Architectural style: Regency

Listed Building – Grade I
- Official name: Nos. 1–13 (Consecutive) Arundel Terrace
- Designated: 13 October 1952
- Reference no.: 1379917

Arundel Terrace is a road in Kemp Town, Brighton, containing 1–13 Arundel Terrace, a row of Grade I listed buildings; numbers 12–13 are known as Arundel House. The buildings were built between 1824 and 1828 by Amon Wilds and Charles Busby.

== History ==
The Arundel Terrace houses were built for Thomas Read Kemp by Amon Wilds and Charles Busby between 1824 and 1828. All were constructed with Doric porches and ironwork balconies, although not all these remain, and the buildings were built facing the sea. They were built as part of a 106 house development plan for the Kemp Town area of Brighton.

Number 13 was the first building to be completed, and was used from 1826–1851 as the Bush Hotel, before being put up for sale by the building's owners, a Mr Creasy and Mr Wilkinson. The building was then converted into a private house, and then a girls' school. In 1910 it became a nursing home, and in the 1950 it was converted into a guest house. Number One was the home of lawyer and financier Chevalier François de Rosaz; in his will, de Rosaz asked for the building to be converted into a Catholic asylum. Number 5 has had a string of interesting owners and residents. From 1853–57, it was the home of writer William Harrison Ainsworth; during his time living at 5 Arundel Terrace, he wrote the novels The Star Chamber, The Flitch of Bacon, The Spendthrift, The Life and Adventures of Mervyn Clitheroe, and Ovingdean Grange. A plaque outside commemorates Ainsworth. Number 5 was also the home of the painter Count William de Belleroche, son of the pioneer of lithography, Albert de Belleroche; broadcaster Annie Nightingale (1964–67); writer and Second World War Royal Air Force hero Paul Richey (1967–73); and it has been the home of journalist Roy Greenslade since 1973. Actor Robert Flemyng lived at Number 6 from 1949 until his death in 1995. He let the ground floor to West End theatre star Douglas Byng from 1974 until his death in 1987; his ashes were scattered outside the buildings. Ronald Searle, the cartoonist and creator of St Trinian's School, lived at Number 8, 1958–64. The playwright and screenwriter John Osborne lived at Number 7 (1948–49), as did John Henson Infield, the proprietor of the Evening Argus and Sussex Daily News (1920–38) and Edward FitzGerald, the 7th Duke of Leinster (1966–70). Actor and singer Millicent Martin lived at Number 8, 1970–73.

Number 11 is listed as being put up for sale as an eleven bedroom private house in 1844,

In 1952, the Terrace, including Arundel House (which is listed as being numbers 12–13 Arundel Terrace), became a Grade I listed building. In 2015, Arundel Terrace was included in plans made for a proposal for Brighton Promenade to become a UNESCO World Heritage Site.
