= Kemp Town =

19th-century residential estate in Brighton

Kemp Town Estate
- Kemp Town
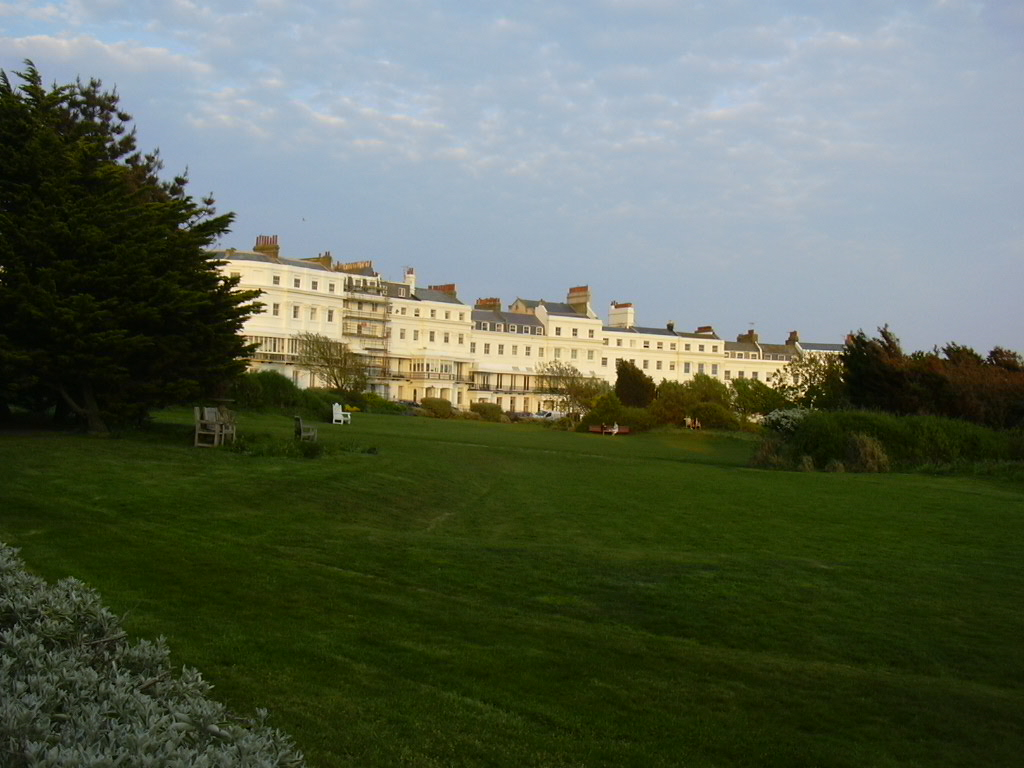
- Lewes Crescent and its private gardens

- Location in England Kemp Town (England)
- 50°48′58″N 0°06′40″W
- Type: Residential estate
- Location: Brighton, East Sussex, England

History
- Built: 1823–1855
- Built by: Thomas Cubitt

Site notes
- Architect(s): Charles Busby, Amon Henry Wilds
- Architectural style: Regency architecture

Kemp Town Estate, also known as Kemp Town, is a 19th-century Regency architecture residential estate in the east of Brighton in East Sussex, England. It consists of Arundel Terrace, Lewes Crescent, Sussex Square, Chichester Terrace, and the Kemp Town Enclosures (the gardens). The estate was conceived and financed by Thomas Read Kemp, designed by Charles Busby and Amon Henry Wilds, and constructed by Thomas Cubitt. Work began in 1823 and it was completed in 1855. It has given its name to the larger Kemptown region of Brighton.

== History ==
Kemp Town Estate was designed by Charles Busby and Amon Henry Wilds and constructed by Thomas Cubitt. Building work started in 1823 on Arundel Terrace, Chichester Terrace, Lewes Crescent and Sussex Square. Chichester Terrace incorporated the earlier Chichester House. In 1837 Thomas Kemp fled the country to escape his creditors. The project continued under Cubitt with the support of the Fifth Earl of Bristol. It was completed in 1855, with Sussex Square larger than London's Grosvenor Square and at the time the biggest housing crescent in Britain. The original estate is a good example of Regency architecture.

The gardens which form Sussex Square and Lewes Crescent, separated by Eastern Road, are known formally as the Kemp Town Enclosures. Work began on the Enclosures in 1823. Early works led by Henry Philips included the landscaping of the gardens and the addition of a tunnel to the esplanade.

At around the same time, Brighton's neighbour Hove was expanding on the western boundary of Brighton, with the development of the Brunswick Estate which featured similar though smaller Regency-style properties, and its own market, police station, riding school and (as in Kemp Town) small mews streets for staff housing.

== Modern times ==
It has given its name to the larger Kemptown region of Brighton. The majority of the original estate is now demarcated by the modern Kemp Town Conservation Area as defined by the local authority, Brighton and Hove City Council.

The Enclosures are owned communally by the freeholders of the 105 houses which make up the Kemp Town Estate.

Below and to the east of Kemp Town, at beach level, is now Brighton Marina, and Black Rock the site of a former lido.

== Gallery ==
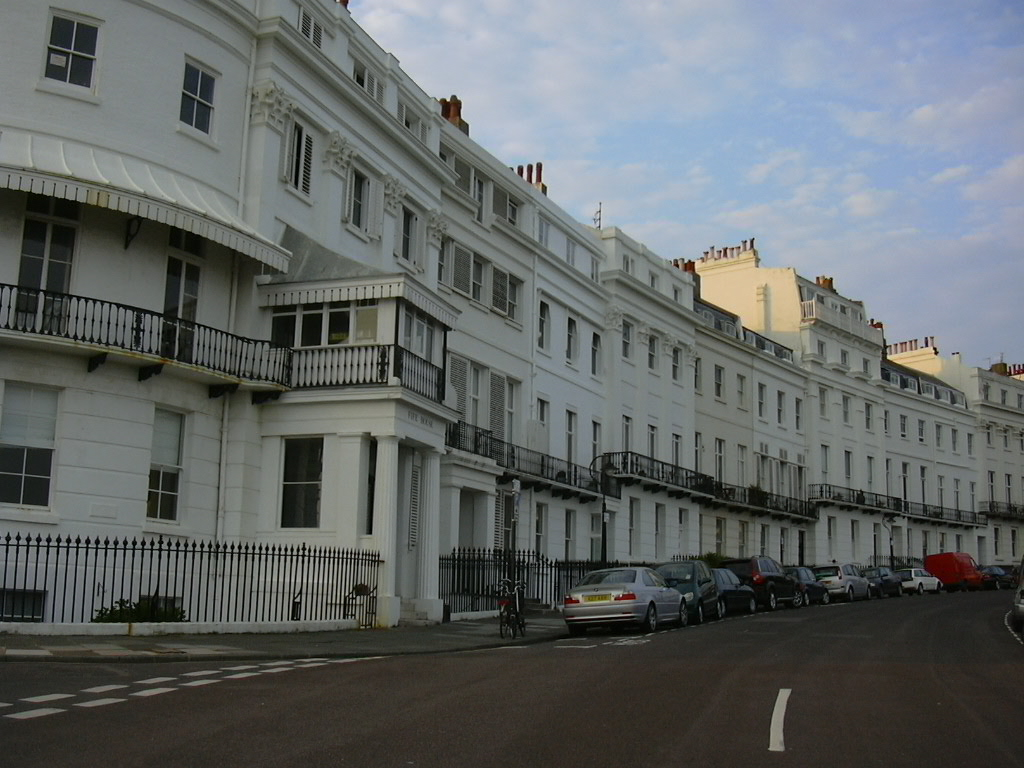
West side of Lewes Crescent

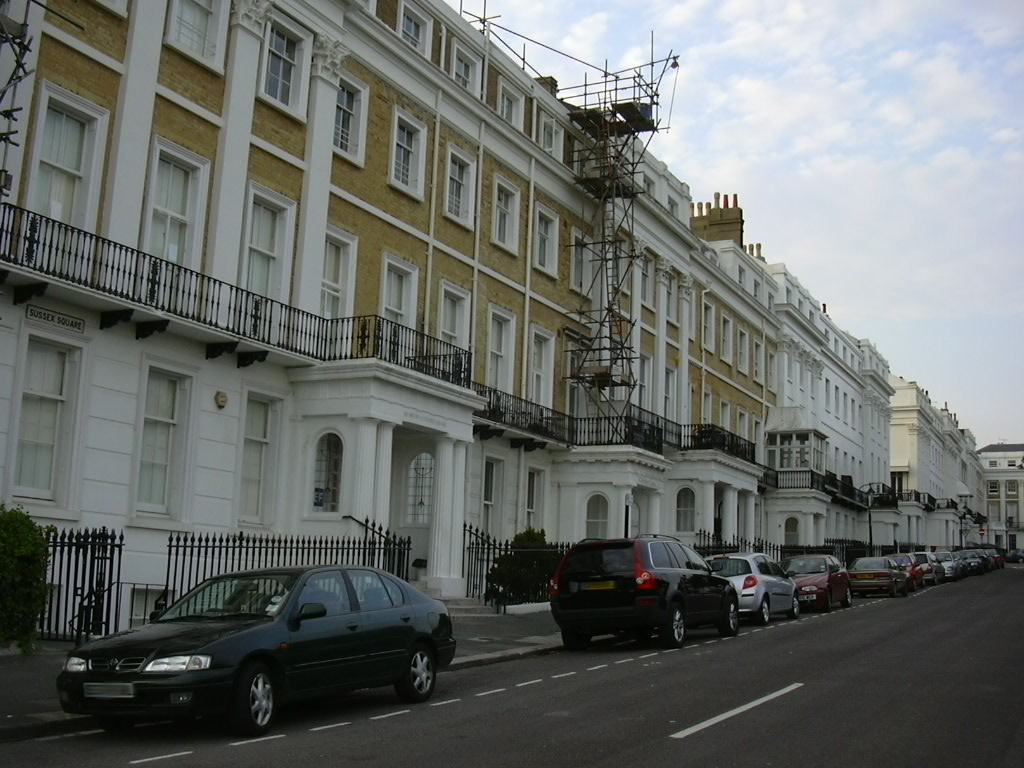
West side of southern half of Sussex Square

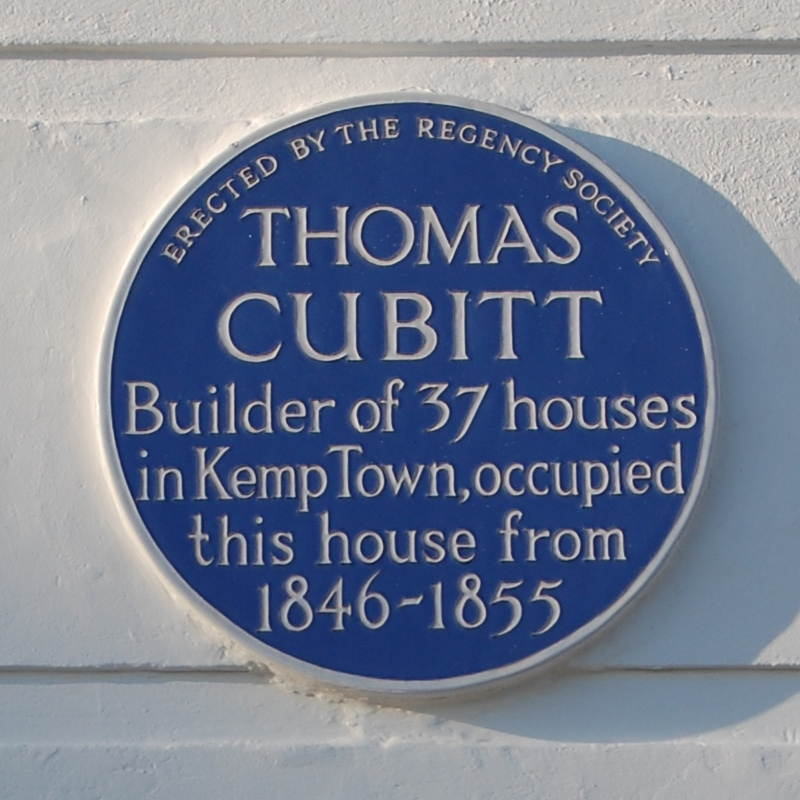
Blue plaque commemorating Thomas Cubitt's residence at 13 Lewes Crescent

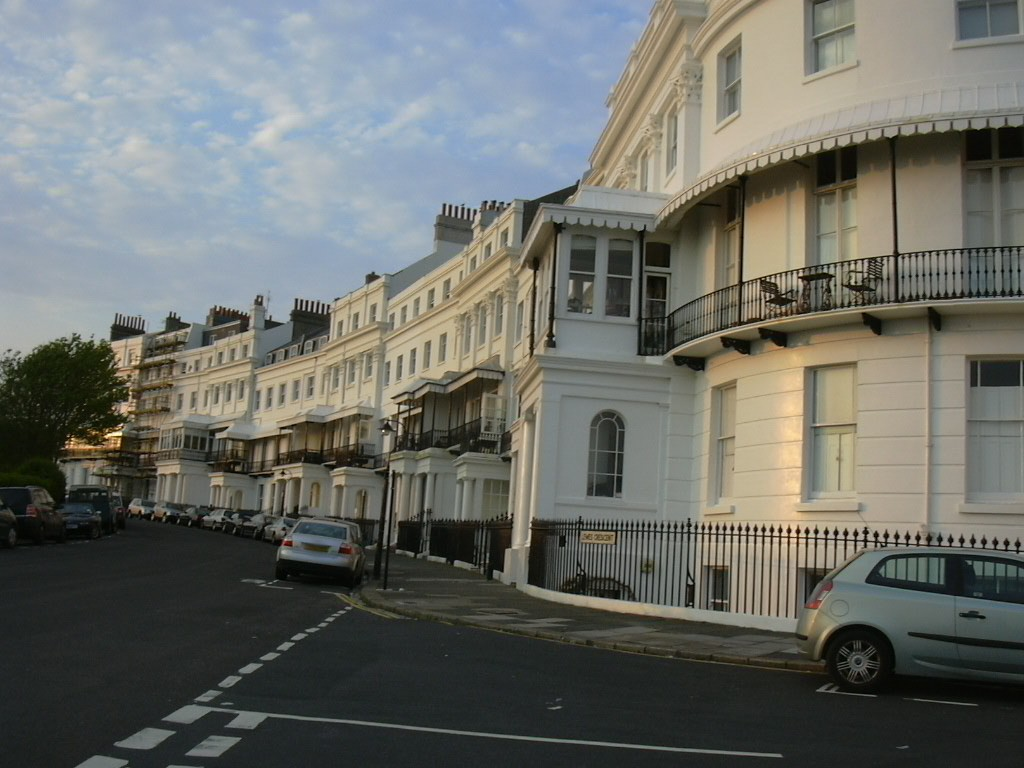
East side of Lewes Crescent

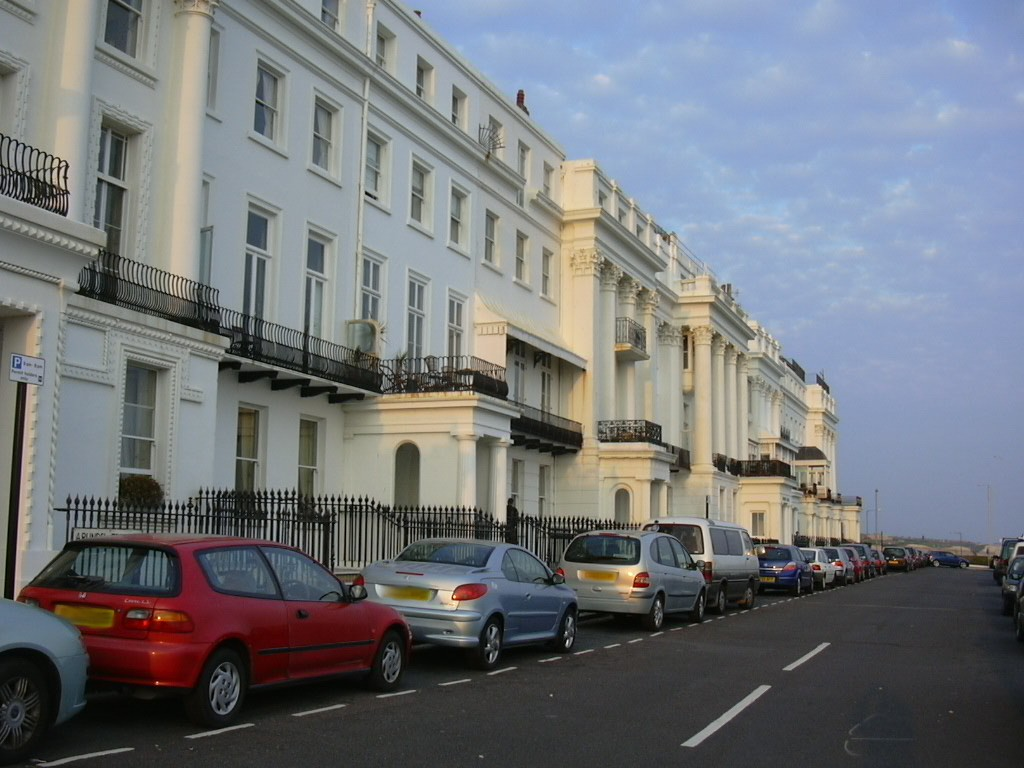
Arundel Terrace

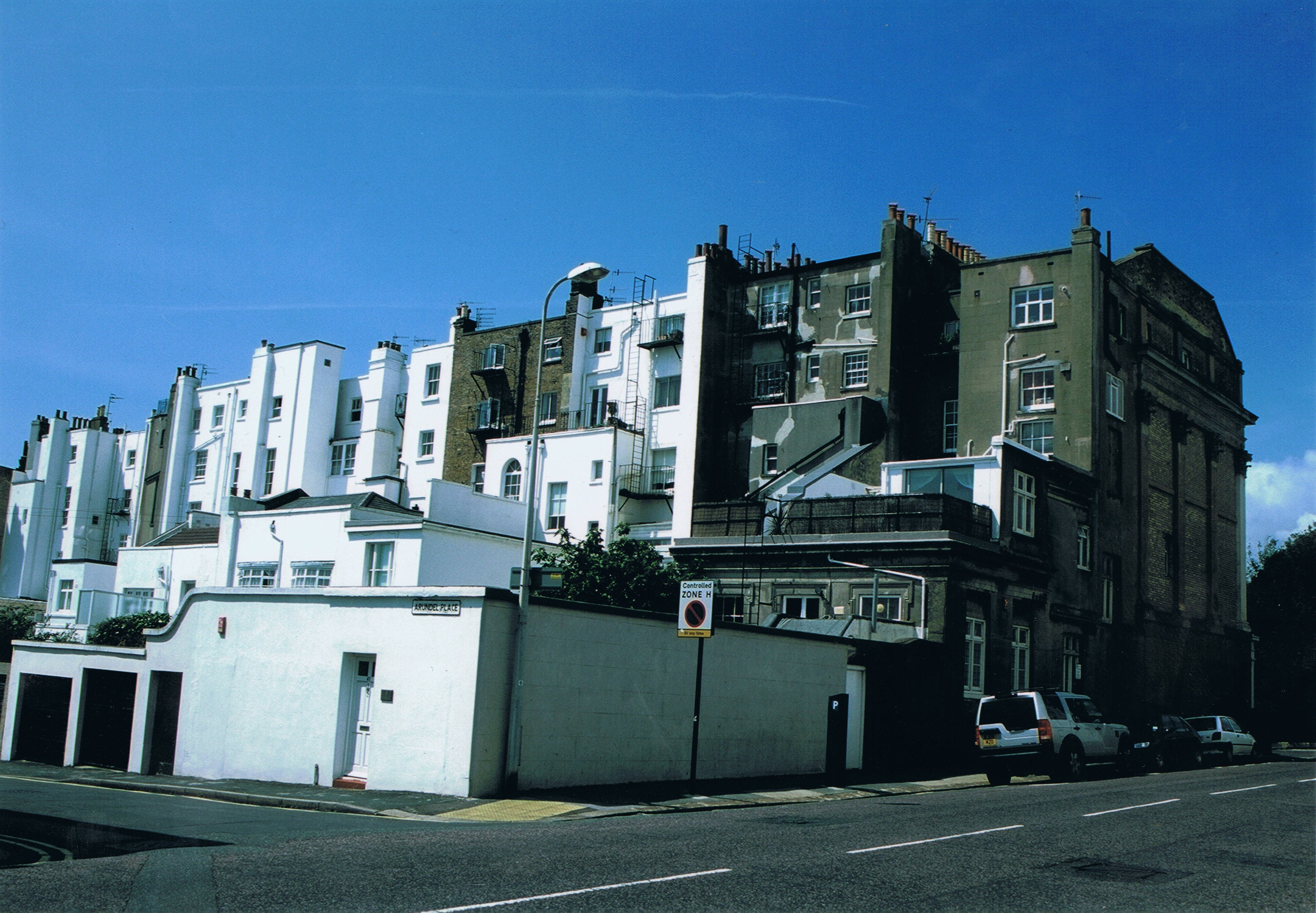
Back of Sussex Square

== General references ==
- Detailed history of (all of) Kemptown
