= John West, 4th Earl De La Warr =

British aristocrat and courtier

The Right Honourable The Earl De La Warr
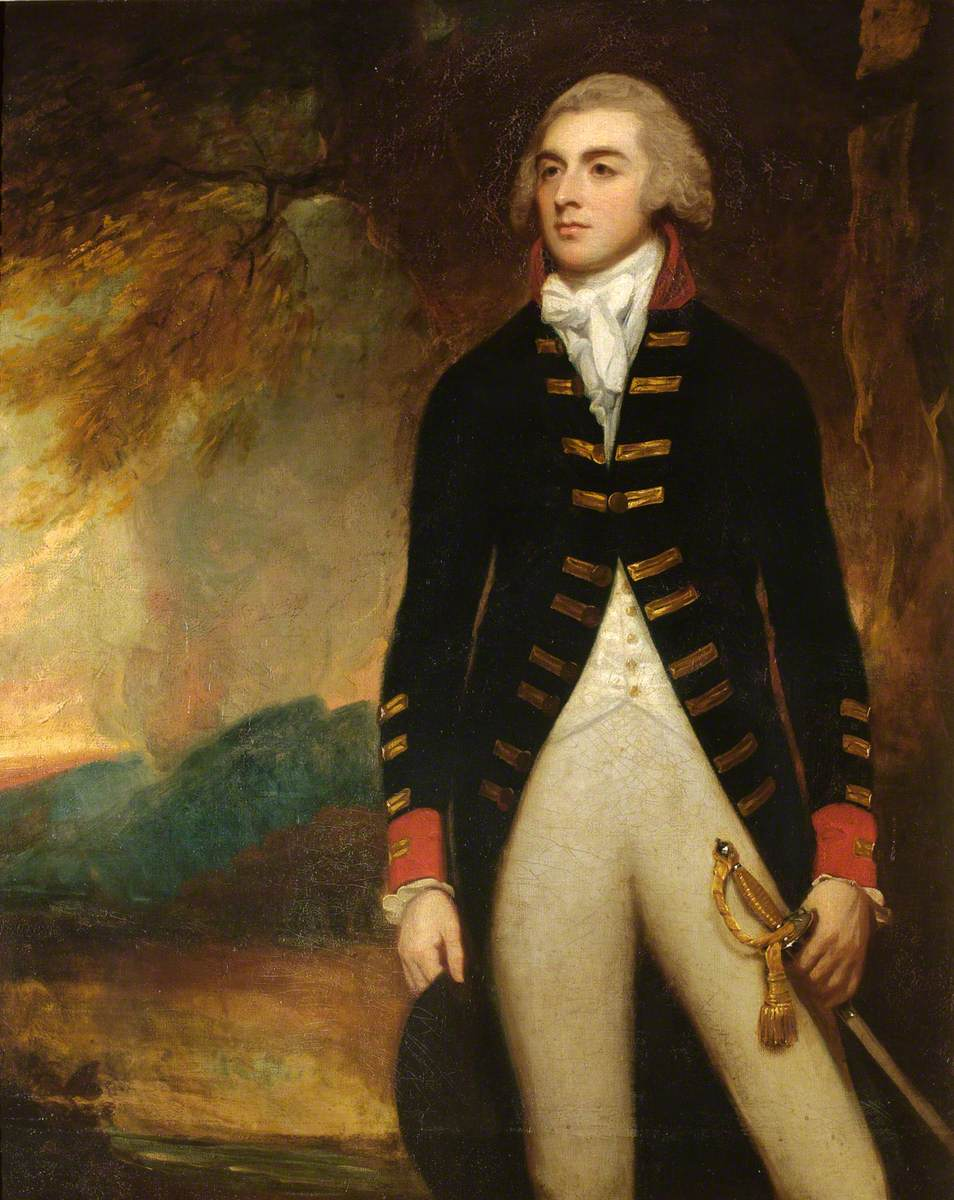
- Portrait of Lord De La Warr by George Romney, 1790

Lord of the Bedchamber
- In office 1789–1795

Personal details
- Born: John Richard West; 28 July 1758
- Died: 28 July 1795 (aged 37)
- Spouse: Catherine Lyell (m. 1783)
- Children: 2
- Parent(s): John West, 2nd Earl De La Warr; Mary Wynyard
- Education: Eton College

John Richard West, 4th Earl De La Warr (28 July 1758 – 28 July 1795), styled The Honourable John West between 1761 and 1783, was a British aristocrat and courtier.

== Early life ==
West was the second son of Mary (née Wynyard), Countess De La Warr, and Lieutenant-General John West, 2nd Earl De La Warr, Lord Chamberlain to Queen Charlotte. His elder brother was William West, 3rd Earl De La Warr, a Lt.-Col. in the Coldstream Guards and his younger brother was Frederick West (who married twice and had issue by both wives). He also had two sisters, Lady Georgiana West (the wife of Edward Pery Buckley and mother of Edward Pery Buckley, MP for Salisbury), and Lady Matilda West (the wife of Gen. Henry Wynyard, Commander-in-Chief, Scotland).

His paternal grandparents were John West, 1st Earl De La Warr (only son of John West, 6th Baron De La Warr) and the former Lady Charlotte McCarthy (only daughter of Donough MacCarthy, 4th Earl of Clancarty and Lady Elizabeth Spencer, second daughter of Robert Spencer, 2nd Earl of Sunderland. His maternal grandparents were Lieutenant-General John Wynyard and the former Catherine Allestrec.

== Career ==
He was educated at Eton.

He served in the 2nd Foot Guards with the rank of lieutenant. In 1778 he was appointed an Equerry to the Queen Consort, a post he held until 1783, when he also succeeded his elder brother William in the earldom. In 1789 he was made a Lord of the Bedchamber, which he remained until his death six years later.

== Personal life ==
On 22 April 1783, Lord De La Warr was married to Catherine Lyell (b. c. 1756; d. 27 May 1826), daughter of Henry Lyell, of Bourn, Cambridgeshire, a Swedish nobleman who had emigrated to England, and the former Catharine Allestrie (only child of George Allestrie of Alvaston, Devon). Together, they had one son and one daughter:

- Lady Catherine Georgiana West (1788–1824), who married Lt.-Col. Joseph D'Arcy, who served as aide-de-camp to the Richard Wellesley, 1st Marquess Wellesley, in 1817.
- George John West, 5th Earl De La Warr (1791–1869), who married Lady Elizabeth Sackville, daughter of John Sackville, 3rd Duke of Dorset, in 1813.

He died in July 1795, aged 37, and was succeeded in the title by his only son, George. Lady De La Warr died on 27 May 1826 and was buried at Bourn in Cambridgeshire.

=== Descendants ===
Through his only son George (who in 1843 took by Royal Licence the name Sackville before that of West so his wife could inherit part of her father's estate), he was posthumously a grandfather of ten, nine of whom lived into maturity, including: George Sackville, Viscount Cantelupe (an MP for Helston and Lewes who died unmarried), Charles Sackville-West, 6th Earl De La Warr, Reginald Sackville, 7th Earl De La Warr, Lady Elizabeth Sackville-West (the wife of Francis Russell, 9th Duke of Bedford), Mortimer Sackville-West, 1st Baron Sackville, Lady Mary Catherine (wife of James Gascoyne-Cecil, 2nd Marquess of Salisbury and, secondly, Edward Stanley, 15th Earl of Derby), Lionel Sackville-West, 2nd Baron Sackville, William Sackville-West (who married Georgina Dodwell and had issue, including Lionel Sackville-West, 3rd Baron Sackville), and Lady Arabella Diana Sackville-West (wife of Sir Alexander Bannerman, 9th Baronet).

Peerage of Great Britain
Preceded by William Augustus West	Earl De La Warr; 1783–1795	Succeeded by George John Sackville-West
