= Sackville (surname) =

Sackville is an English surname of Norman origin, deriving from the Norman villages of Sauqueville and/or Sacquenville. Notable people with the surname include:

== Dukes and Earls of Dorset ==
- Thomas Sackville, 1st Earl of Dorset (1527–1608)
  - Sir William Sackville (c. 1570–1592), English army officer in the service of Henry IV of France, son of the 1st earl
- Robert Sackville, 2nd Earl of Dorset (1561–1609)
  - Lady Margaret Sackville (1562–1591), wife of the 2nd earl
  - Anne Sackville, Countess of Dorset (died 1618), 2nd wife of the 2nd earl
- Richard Sackville, 3rd Earl of Dorset (1589–1624)
- Edward Sackville, 4th Earl of Dorset (1590–1652)
- Richard Sackville, 5th Earl of Dorset (1622–1677)
- Charles Sackville, 6th Earl of Dorset (1638–1706)
  - Mary Sackville, Countess of Dorset (1669–1691)
- Lionel Sackville, 1st Duke of Dorset (1688–1765)
- Charles Sackville, 2nd Duke of Dorset (1711–1769)
- John Sackville, 3rd Duke of Dorset (1745–1799)
  - Mary Sackville (1792–1864)
- George Sackville, 4th Duke of Dorset (1793–1815)

== Earls De La Warr ==
- Reginald Sackville, 7th Earl De La Warr (1817–1896)
  - Lady Margaret Sackville (1881–1963), English poet and children's author, daughter of the 7th earl
- Gilbert Sackville, 8th Earl De La Warr (1869–1915)
  - Lady Idina Sackville (1893–1955), member of the notoriously hedonistic Happy Valley set, daughter of the 8th earl
- Herbrand Sackville, 9th Earl De La Warr (1900–1976)
- William Sackville, 10th Earl De La Warr (1921–1988)
- William Sackville, 11th Earl De La Warr (born 1948)
- William Sackville, Lord Buckhurst (born 1979), the heir apparent

== Viscounts Sackville ==
- George Germain, 1st Viscount Sackville (1716–1785), British soldier and politician, styled the Honourable George Sackville until 1720 and Lord George Sackville from 1720 to 1770

== Other people with the name ==
- Amy Sackville (born 1981), British writer
- Kerri Sackville, Australian author
- Mary Sackville (1746–1778), British noblewoman
- Edward Sackville (disambiguation)
- John Sackville (disambiguation)
- Richard Sackville (disambiguation)
- Ronald Sackville, Australian judge from 1994 to 2019
- Thomas Sackville (disambiguation)

== See also ==
- Sackville-West, a surname
- Sackville-Baggins, a fictional family in The Hobbit and The Lord of the Rings
