= Sackville-West =

Sackville-West is a surname. Notable people with the surname include:

== Barons Sackville ==
- Mortimer Sackville-West, 1st Baron Sackville (1820–1888)
- Lionel Sackville-West, 2nd Baron Sackville (1827–1908)
- Lionel Sackville-West, 3rd Baron Sackville (1867–1928)
  - Victoria Sackville-West, Baroness Sackville, wife of 3rd baron; daughter of 2nd baron; mother of Vita
- Charles Sackville-West, 4th Baron Sackville (1870–1962)
- Edward Sackville-West, 5th Baron Sackville (1901–1965)
- Lionel Sackville-West, 6th Baron Sackville (1913–2004)
- Robert Sackville-West, 7th Baron Sackville (b. 1958)

== Earls De La Warr ==
- George Sackville-West, 5th Earl De La Warr (1791–1869)
  - Elizabeth Sackville-West, Countess De La Warr, his wife
- Charles Sackville-West, 6th Earl De La Warr (1815–1873)

== Other people with the name ==
- Vita Sackville-West (1892–1962), English author and garden designer; daughter of Victoria

== See also ==
- Sackville (surname)
