= Peerage law =

The British peerage is governed by a body of law that has developed over several centuries. Much of this law has been established by a few important cases, and some of the more significant of these are addressed in this article.

== Peerage disputes ==
The Crown, as fount of honour, may determine all petitions claiming peerages. The sovereign upon the Attorney General's advice can grant the claim or, in contentious matters, send it to the House of Lords, who in turn send it to the Select Committee for Privileges. (The House of Lords appoints 16 peers – including the Chairman of Committees – to the committee.) Next, the sovereign makes a final decision based upon the Committee for Privileges' recommendation.

The Committee for Privileges also has a role in terminating abeyant peerages. A co-heir may petition the sovereign for a termination of the abeyance in his or her favour; the sovereign can choose to grant the petition, but if there is any doubt as to the petitioner's pedigree, the claim is usually referred to the Committee for Privileges. If the claim is unopposed, the committee will generally award the claim to the petitioner. Under a decision of 1927, however, the committee can deny a claim if the peerage has been in abeyance for more than 100 years, or if the petitioner holds less than one-third of the claim (an eldest son would inherit all of his parents' claim, while daughters divide their parents' claim amongst them in the absence of sons). Incidentally, the House of Lords made a standing order in 1954 directing that the committee may deny a claim if the co-heirs have entered into an "improper arrangement." This rule prevents co-heirs of multiple baronies by writ from agreeing not to contest each other's claims, thereby dividing the baronies by writ amongst themselves.

In claims regarding the Peerage of Scotland, the Court of the Lord Lyon King of Arms in Scotland has a major role in identifying the rightful heir or heiress to an aristocratic title. These titles (as in England) are composed of Dukedoms, Marquessates, Earldoms, and Viscounties, plus Lordships (which are the equivalent of Baronies in the Peerage of England). Only the Lords have jurisdiction over succession to peerages, but the Lyon Court does have jurisdiction over succession to coats-of-arms. Under Scottish law, an individual's heir succeeds to his arms undifferenced, while other descendants may succeed to arms differenced by special marks, called cadency marks. The case before the Lyon Court involves a dispute as to who may lawfully succeed to a deceased peer's (i.e., aristocrat's) arms "undifferenced" — the lawful successor to the arms will normally also be the successor to the peerage.

For further information about the Committee for Privileges, see: https://publications.parliament.uk/pa/ld/ldprivi.htm

== Significant cases ==
=== The Earl of Bristol's Case (1626) ===
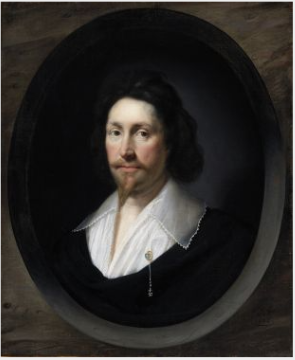
John Digby, 1st Earl of Bristol (1628 portrait)

The reign of Charles I was marked by the growing absolutism of the monarchy (which eventually contributed to the English Civil War and Charles' execution). In 1626, the King decided not to issue a writ of summons to John Digby, 1st Earl of Bristol, who was charged with, but not convicted of, high treason. Since he could not be admitted to the House without such a writ, Lord Bristol made a petition to the House of Lords. The Committee for Privileges reported,

"after diligent search, no precedent being found that any writ of summons hath been detained from any peer that is capable of sitting in the House of Parliament; and considering withal how far it may trench into the right of every member of this House, whether sitting by ancient right of inheritance or by patent, to have their writs detained; the Lords Committees are all of opinion, That it will be necessary for this House humbly to beseech His Majesty, that a writ of summons may be sent to this petitioner, and to such other Lords to whom no writ of summons hath been directed for this Parliament, excepting such as are made incapable to sit in Parliament by judgment of Parliament or any other legal judgment."

There was some delay, but Lord Bristol eventually received the King's writ of summons. The writ was accompanied by a letter from the Lord Keeper of the Great Seal, Thomas Coventry; it read,

"I ... signify His Majesty's pleasure herein further; That, howsoever he gives way to the awarding of the writ, yet his meaning thereby is not to discharge any former direction for restraint of your Lordship's coming hither; but that you continue under the same restriction as you did before, so as your Lordship's personal attendance is to be forborne."

Lord Bristol nevertheless attended Parliament, arguing that a writ personally issued by the sovereign was of more weight than the letter of a Lord Keeper. The practice of denying writs of summons to eligible peers has since been abandoned.

=== Rex v Purbeck (1678) ===
For the early part of English history, peers sometimes surrendered their peerages to the Crown. Most surrenders occurred during the early years of the nation, but surrender occurred as late as 1640, when Roger Stafford, 6th Baron Stafford was ordered to surrender his dignity to the Crown in return for eight hundred pounds sterling. Later that year, however, the House of Lords, in order to guard the position of its members, which had been threatened by the power to order surrenders of peerages, resolved,

"(i) That no person that hath any Honour of him and a Peer of this Realm, may alien or transfer the Honour to any other Person, (ii) That no Peer of this Realm can drown or extinguish his Honour, but that it descends to his descendants, neither by Surrender, Grant, Fine, nor any other conveyance to the King."

Nevertheless, the Crown accepted the surrender of the Viscountcy of Purbeck, which had been created for John Villiers in 1619. In 1624, Frances, Viscountess Purbeck, who had been separated from her husband and engaged in a relationship with another man, gave birth to a presumably illegitimate son, Robert. In 1657, when the first viscount died, Robert surrendered his peerage under the presumption that he was illegitimate (which could not be proven beyond doubt). He was then elected to the House of Commons. In 1660, he was charged before the House of Lords for "treasonable and blasphemous speech." He asserted that, since he was a member of the House of Commons, the Lords had no right to punish him. The House of Lords responded by declaring that he was not a commoner, but a peer, and was therefore subject to the authority of the Lords. Immediately, he "levied a fine" to the King, surrendering his peerages to the Crown. In 1676, his son applied for a writ of summons to Parliament, claiming the viscountcy. The matter was referred to the House of Lords, which unanimously ruled in Rex v Purbeck that no "fine" could allow a peer to dispose of his peerage.

Peerages in the Peerage of Scotland were not subject to these rules prior to the Acts of Union 1707. In Scots law prior to that date, it was possible to surrender a peerage and receive a regrant, the procedure being known as a novodamus. One instance was the novodamus of the Dukedom of Queensberry, the new dukedom having a remainder preventing the title from passing to the second duke's eldest son, who was insane. Additionally, it is now possible (under the Peerage Act 1963) to "disclaim" a peerage—doing so deprives the holder of the peerage for life, but does not destroy it, as it descends upon the death of the peer making the disclaimer.

=== Mar Peerage Case (1875) ===
The Earldom of Mar is the oldest extant title in Great Britain, and probably in Europe. The origins of the title are unclear, but is known that in 1404, a man named Alexander Stewart forced the suo jure Countess, Isabel Douglas, to sign a charter conveying the peerage to him and his heirs. Later, the countess married Stewart and revoked the old charter. She then agreed to convey the earldom to him for his life, following which it would pass to her own heirs. In 1426, Lord Mar resigned his title and the King of Scots regranted it, thereby legitimising his wife's actions. The King specified that the earldom and lands of Mar would revert to the Crown upon the death of the Earl, which occurred in 1435. Robert, Lord Erskine, the heir to the deceased Earl, claimed the earldom under the countess' charter, but the King claimed it under his own patent. In 1457, James II obtained a court order favouring his position; the lands, therefore, were transferred to the Crown. Later kings granted the earldom and associated lands to members of the royal family. In each case, however, the earldom returned to the Crown either because of the treason of the holder or a failure to produce heirs. Mary, Queen of Scots, finally did justice in 1565 by restoring the earldom to John Erskine, the heir of the dispossessed Robert Erskine.

Upon the death of the ninth Earl of Mar in 1866, the earldom was disputed between two of his kinsmen. The heir-general to the earldom was John Goodeve-Erskine, son of the sister of the ninth Earl. Walter Erskine, 12th Earl of Kellie, claimed the title as heir-male (i.e. senior living descendant through sons only) of the seventh Earl of Mar. Goodeve-Erskine's claim was originally unopposed; he even participated in elections for representative peers. Later, the Earl of Kellie petitioned to be recognised as a peer. He died before it could be considered; the claim was carried on by his son, also named Walter, the 13th Earl of Kellie. The petition made several claims:

- The original Earldom of Mar was a territorial title rather than a title of peerage and was therefore "indivisible." (In other words, the territory could not be separated from the title.)
- Alexander Stewart obtained a new Royal charter for the earldom, rather than receiving it in right of his wife Isabel.
- After the death of Alexander Stewart, his lands were passed to the Sovereign in accordance with the patent, and thereafter were disposed of by the Crown.
- As the territorial earldom was "indivisible," upon the termination of the territory, the earldom must have ended also.
- Therefore, since the territorial earldom had already become non-existent, Mary's 1565 grant was not a revival of that title. Rather, it was a totally new creation, this time in the form of a peerage title.
- Since the instrument of Queen Mary's 1565 grant cannot be found, the presumption ought to be that the earldom passes to heirs-male, and not to heirs-general. Thus, the Earl of Kellie is entitled to the Earldom of Mar as he is the late Earl of Mar's heir male, while John Goodeve-Erskine was an heir-general.

Goodeve-Erskine had different ideas, however. He portrayed the Crown's takeover of the territorial earldom not as pursuant to a lawful patent, but rather as an act of tyranny. He argued:

- James I, in a tyrannical act, seized the lands of Alexander Stewart, when these should have passed to Robert, Lord Erskine.
- The "true" Earls never agreed to terminate their claim to the earldom.
- Queen Mary's 1565 grant was a restitution of the old territorial earldom rather than a new creation.
- Because the title is a restoration of a territorial earldom, and because the territorial earldom could pass to heirs-general, John Goodeve-Erskine was the rightful heir, being the late Earl of Mar's heir-general.

The House of Lords Committee on Privileges, which did not include any Scottish members, ruled in 1875 that the Earldom of Mar was newly created in 1565, passed only to heirs-male, and therefore belonged to the Earl of Kellie, and not to Goodeve-Erskine. The Lord Chancellor, Roundell Palmer, 1st Baron Selborne, declared it to be "final, right or wrong, and not to be questioned". Many Scottish peers were outraged; the Earl of Crawford and Balcarres even wrote a two-volume history of the earldom refuting the ruling of the committee. It was argued that the 1565 earldom was merely a product of the imagination of the House of Lords, and that Goodeve-Erskine was the true heir to the ancient earldom. Many in Parliament agreed, but the decision of the Lords could not be overturned. Instead, the Earldom of Mar Restitution Act 1885 (48 & 49 Vict. c. 48) was passed (without dissent); it declared that because of the doubts relating to the 1565 creation, it would be assumed that there are two earldoms of Mar. The earldom created in 1565 would be held by the Earl of Kellie. The ancient earldom, however, was declared to be still in existence, and was given to John Goodeve-Erskine.

=== Wensleydale Peerage Case (1856) ===
The appellate jurisdiction of the House of Lords grew from the ancient authority of the Curia Regis, or King's Court, to hear appeals from the lower courts. Following the development of Parliament, members of the House of Lords sat along with the Great Officers of State and various senior judges. By the 14th century, the House of Lords gained the sole power to decide such appeals. The power fell into disuse in the 16th century, but was revived in the 17th century.

Many cases were heard by Lords with no legal education or experience, and this led to public discontent. It was suggested that more judges be appointed to the House of Lords, but it was not desired that their descendants continue to sit by virtue of the peerages they would have inherited had the judges been created hereditary peers. It was therefore suggested that the group of judges admitted to Parliament for the duration of their respective lives be added to the class of hereditary peers of the realm. Life peerages themselves were not unprecedented, though it was unclear whether or not life peers were by virtue of their titles entitled to sit in the House of Lords. In most cases, the peerages were granted to women, but they were not eligible for a seat in the House of Lords; there was no example of a male sitting in the House by virtue of a life peerage for over four centuries.

Another precedent cited were the examples of peerages with remainders other than to the heirs-male of the body of the grantee: the Dukedom of Dover (1707; to the younger son of the grantee, and his heirs-male, though the eldest son was still living), the Earldom of Northumberland (to the son-in-law of the grantee, and his heirs-male), the Earldom of de Grey (1816; heirs-male of the grantee's sister), and several others. The first holder, in effect, was made a peer for life, while the second holder received a hereditary peerage subject to the ordinary rules of inheritance.

Several authorities declared that the Crown had the power to add life peers to the House of Lords. Therefore, on the advice of her ministers, Queen Victoria created the Barony of Wensleydale, a life peerage, for Sir James Parke, a Baron of the Court of the Exchequer (baron in this case being a judicial rather than a noble title), in 1856. When Parliament met, Lord Wensleydale, being ill with gout, failed to present himself and take his seat. Thereafter, John Singleton Copley, 1st Baron Lyndhurst moved that the entire matter be referred to the Committee for Privileges. During the debates, it was pointed out that no case of a life peer sitting in the House of Lords had occurred for over four centuries — the question, then, was, whether or not the power of the Crown was lost with time. The ministers of the Crown pointed out the doctrine that the Royal prerogative was not fettered by the passage of time. On the other hand, it was pointed out that formerly, the Sovereign's power over the composition of Parliament was without limit: peers entitled to seats in Parliament were denied writs of summons; constituencies were enfranchised or disenfranchised in the House of Commons through the exercise of the Royal prerogative. That power, however, had been vitiated by the time of the Wensleydale case. Thus, it was submitted that the Crown could not change the constitutional character of Parliament alone; rather, an act of Parliament, with the authority of the sovereign and both Houses, was necessitated.

Ministers argued that, without a reference from the Crown, the House of Lords was powerless to consider the matter. Nevertheless, the House of Lords voted to send the matter to the Committee for Privileges, one hundred and thirty-eight voting in favour, one hundred and five voting against. The committee reported to the House that "neither the letters patent, nor the letters patent with the usual writ of summons issued in pursuance thereof, can entitle the grantee to sit and vote in Parliament." The Queen submitted to the decision of the House of Lords. Lord Wensleydale was later made a hereditary peer and eventually took his parliamentary seat.

=== Buckhurst Peerage Case (1876) ===
The Buckhurst Peerage Case established the principle that, once a peer inherits the peerage, he is forever "ennobled in blood" and cannot be deprived of it (except by act of Parliament).

In 1864, a barony (Baroness Buckhurst) was created for Elizabeth Sackville-West, the wife of George John Sackville-West, 5th Earl De La Warr, with a provision designed to keep the earldom and barony separate.

The letters patent directed that, if the holder of the barony ever succeeded to the earldom, then he would be automatically deprived of the barony as if he died naturally without issue, the barony being diverted to another line.

The fifth Earl died in 1869 and was succeeded by his son Charles as sixth Earl.

In 1870, the Baroness Buckhurst died and was succeeded not by her elder son, the sixth Earl, but by her younger son Reginald, who later succeeded to the earldom in 1873, as 7th Earl.

The letters patent said that, by succeeding to the earldom, he would be deprived of the Barony of Buckhurst, which was then claimed by a third brother, Mortimer.

The House of Lords, however, refused to recognise the "shifting remainder" in the peerage.

They ruled that once a peer succeeds to a title, he cannot be deprived of it except by an act of Parliament, whatever the terms of the creation.

Note, however, that it is possible to prevent a person from succeeding to a peerage in the first place, but not possible to deprive a person of a peerage after having succeeded to it.

Thus, Charles Sackville-West, who already held the earldom at the time of his mother's death, was never allowed to succeed to his mother's peerage (a somewhat similar provision applies to the Scottish earldom of Selkirk in relation to the dukedom of Hamilton).

On the other hand, Reginald Sackville-West succeeded to the barony but was later stripped of it—an impermissible action.

Lawyers for Mortimer Sackville-West argued that the reasoning that peers could not be deprived of peerages was flawed. They pointed out that, if a peer succeeds to the monarchy, then that person is immediately deprived of the peerage, which "merges in the Crown". Hugh Cairns, 1st Baron Cairns, explained the seeming contradiction by suggesting, "The fountain and source of all dignities [i.e., the sovereign] cannot hold a dignity from himself. The dignity ... terminates, not by virtue of any provisions in its creation but from the absolute incapacity of the sovereign to hold a dignity."

Mortimer Sackville-West therefore was not allowed to succeed to the Barony of Buckhurst, which remained vested in his eldest surviving brother, Reginald. He was consoled, however, by being independently created Baron Sackville.

=== The Viscountess Rhondda's Claim (1922) ===
Women were formerly excluded from the House of Lords, as well as from other public positions. The Sex Disqualification (Removal) Act 1919 provided that "A person shall not be disqualified by sex or marriage from the exercise of any public function." In 1922, the Viscountess Rhondda, a peeress suo jure, claimed a seat in the House on the grounds that sitting in Parliament constituted the exercise of a public function. At first, the matter was referred to the Law Lords, who were unanimously of the opinion that women were qualified to sit in the House by virtue of the act. The House, however, recommitted the question to the full Privileges Committee.

The opposition to the Viscountess Rhondda was led by the Lord Chancellor, Frederick Edwin Smith, 1st Earl of Birkenhead. The Lord Chancellor argued that, to change the composition of the House of Lords, Parliament would have to use clear words; vague words like "public function" would not suffice. The Committee for Privileges agreed by a vote of twenty-two to four. Women remained excluded from the House of Lords until 1958, when life peeresses were admitted to the House. Hereditary peeresses were admitted by the Peerage Act 1963, though there have always been very few of them, since most hereditary peerages can be inherited only by males.

=== Petition of the Earl of Antrim (1967) ===
Ireland had, from 1801, the right to send twenty-eight representative peers to the House of Lords. In 1922, with the foundation of the Irish Free State, such elections ceased, but any individuals already elected were allowed to stay in the House of Lords. The last surviving Irish representative peer, Francis Needham, 4th Earl of Kilmorey, died in 1961. In 1965, Randal McDonnell, 8th Earl of Antrim, along with some other Irish peers, petitioned the House of Lords to recognise their right to elect representatives, the matter being sent to the Committee for Privileges.

The Committee ruled against the Irish peers. The Lord Reid, a Lord of Appeal in Ordinary, delivered the opinion with which most members of the Committee agreed, determining against the petitioners' argument that representative peers represented Irish peers, not Ireland by pointing out that the Act of Union gave them seats "on the part of Ireland." Since the island had been divided into the Irish Free State and Northern Ireland, there was no such political entity called "Ireland" which the representative peers could represent. Lord Reid wrote, "A statutory provision is impliedly repealed if a later enactment brings to an end a state of things the continuance of which is essential for its operation."

The Lord Wilberforce, also a Lord of Appeal, disagreed that a major enactment such as the Act of Union could be repealed by implication. He argued instead that the Irish Free State (Agreement) Act 1922—which was silent on the election of representative peers—abolished the posts of Lord Chancellor of Ireland and Clerk of the Crown in Ireland. The Lord Chancellor of Ireland was responsible for calling elections of representative peers, and the Clerk of the Crown in Ireland was responsible for sending peers their ballots. Since these offices had been abolished, Lord Wilberforce argued, there was no mechanism by which Irish peers could be elected.

The petitioners did not bring up the point that Northern Ireland remained a part of the United Kingdom. Lord Reid's objections would then be rebutted, as representative peers would sit on the part of Northern Ireland. Similarly, Lord Wilberforce's arguments relating to the removal of the mechanism for the election could be answered, as the Lord Chancellor of Ireland and the Clerk of the Crown in Ireland did have replacements in Northern Ireland. Burke's Peerage & Baronetage suggests that the reason for which the arguments relating to Northern Ireland "was that leading counsel for the petitioning Irish peers was convinced that the members of the Committee for Privileges were with him on what he considered was his best argument and did not want to alienate them by introducing another point."

The House of Lords later agreed to the Committee's decision. In order to prevent further appeals on the matter, Parliament passed in 1971, as a part of the annual Statute Law Repeals Bill, a clause revoking the sections of the Act of Union relating to the election of Irish representative peers.

However, the matter did not end there. In 1991, a solicitor named Andrew Turek published an article in the Cambridge Law Journal, in which he suggested that, if Lord Reid was indeed accurate in suggesting that Irish peers had no further right to elect peers because the political entity being represented (Ireland) no longer existed, then the right of representative peers ought to have ended in 1922, when the Irish Free State was formed. He suggested that there was no basis for calling representative peers who had already been elected to Parliament. Then, Turek pointed out the principle of the creation of a peerage by writ. He argued that if an individual was not entitled to attend the House of Lords, but nonetheless received a writ of summons (as the remaining Irish representative peers did following the formation of the Irish Free State), then such individuals were automatically granted a new peerage. In 1995, Barry Maxwell, 12th Baron Farnham applied for a writ of summons because his grandfather, the 11th Baron and a representative peer, had been summoned by writ when there was no basis for doing so, and that therefore a new barony was created for him. The Lords, however, held that there was, in the first place, no error in issuing writs to the Irish representative peers after the formation of the Irish Free State. The Privileges Committee agreed with the Attorney-General that the Irish peers had been elected for life, and that the formation of the Irish Free State only implicitly repealed the right of the Irish peers to hold further elections.

=== Reference on the House of Lords Bill (1999) ===
In 1999, when the House of Lords Bill sought to deprive hereditary peers of the automatic right to sit in the House of Lords, the question arose as to whether or not such a bill would violate the Treaty of Union uniting England and Scotland into the Kingdom of Great Britain. The House of Lords referred the entire question to the Committee for Privileges. The government asserted that it was inappropriate for the committee to give an opinion on the hypothetical effect of a bill that was yet to be enacted, instead of fulfilling its usual role of applying already existing law. The committee still reported to the House of Lords, however, since the whole House had made an order referring the matter to it.

The first issue referred to the committee related to the effect of writs of summons. Writs of summons are issued to peers upon the summoning of each new parliament. The central question was whether writs of summons have a continuing effect throughout Parliament, or whether their effect was "spent" once a peer entered Parliament and handed it in to the Clerk. The portions of the Bill relevant to the issue were: "No-one shall be a member of the House of Lords by virtue of a hereditary peerage ... Accordingly, any writ of summons issued for the present Parliament in right of a hereditary peerage shall not have effect after [the present] Session."

The complaint raised by the Lord Mayhew of Twysden was that the bill would not exclude hereditary peers for the remainder of that Parliament (but not future Parliaments), even though the bill provided that writs of summons already issued would be of no effect. He suggested that such writs were already of no effect, because once a peer attends the House of Lords and presents his writ, the effect of the writ is spent, and the peer immediately becomes a member of the House until Parliament is dissolved (once a new Parliament is called, new writs of summons must be issued).

The Lord Mayhew's counsel argued, "The purpose of a writ of summons is to bring a peer to parliament for the first time. It tells him to come and join the parliament. He then hands in the writ. It has had its effect. He is there; it is no longer needed; it does not keep him: otherwise he would have to return it daily. Once he has handed the writ in, it is his status as lord of that parliament ('a member of the House of Lords') which confers rights and duties." Counsel suggested further that there were separate punishments for failure to obey the writ by attending and for leaving before Parliament concluded without a leave of absence.

The government, meanwhile, argued otherwise. They noted that "The command is not spent once the peer turns up at Parliament—the monarch desires the counsel of the peer throughout the Parliament, and the command expressed in the writ ... continue to have effect throughout that Parliament. Plainly, the monarch's command would not be fully obeyed by a peer who answered the summons, arrived at Parliament and then immediately departed again." Thus, they suggested, it was (and is) necessary for peers to obtain leaves of absence if they intended not to attend the House of Lords. The committee agreed with the government, ruling that writs of summons have effect throughout Parliament.

The other issue referred to the committee involved the Articles of Union of 1707, uniting England and Scotland. The articles guaranteed Scotland sixteen representatives in the House of Lords, but that the House of Lords Bill would rescind such a guarantee. In suggesting that the bill did indeed violate the Articles of Union, it was submitted that, prior to Union, the Parliament of Scotland was entitled to impose conditions, and that one fundamental condition was a guarantee of representation of Scotland in both Houses of Parliament. It was implied, further, that the Peerage Act 1963 did not violate the requirement of Scottish representation, set out in Article XXII, by allowing all Scottish peers to sit in the House of Lords: as long as a minimum of sixteen seats were reserved for Scotland, the principles of the Article would be upheld. It was further argued that the only way to rescind the requirement of Article XXII would be to dissolve the Union between England and Scotland, which, of course, the House of Lords Bill did not seek to do.

Counsel for the government, however, put forward a different view. Firstly, it was noted that the Peerage Act 1963 explicitly repealed the portions of the Articles of Union relating to elections of representative peers, and that no parliamentary commentators had raised doubts as to the validity of those repeals. As Article XXII had been repealed, there was nothing specific in the Treaty that the bill transgressed. To address the argument that the principle (rather than the details) of representation contained in the article had not been, nor could have been, repealed by the Peerage Act or any other act of Parliament, the government submitted that the election of Scottish representative peers had not been "entrenched." Other provisions had been entrenched by the Treaty of Union: for example, England and Scotland were united "forever," the Court of Session was to "remain in all time coming within Scotland as it is now constituted," and the establishment of the Church of Scotland was "effectually and unalterably secured." Article XXII, however, did not include words of entrenchment, and, it was argued, was open to amendment.

It was further pointed out by the government that, even if the election of Scottish peers were entrenched, Parliament could amend the provision under the doctrine of parliamentary sovereignty. Though the position of the Church of Scotland was "unalterably" secured, the Universities (Scotland) Act 1853 repealed the requirement that professors declare their faith before assuming a position. In Ireland, meanwhile, the Church of Ireland was entirely disestablished in 1869, though the Articles of Union with Ireland had clearly entrenched the church's establishment. In 1922, the union with Ireland was dissolved, though the kingdoms were united by the articles "forever." It was therefore suggested that Parliament could, if it pleased, repeal the Articles of Union as well as any underlying principles.

The committee unanimously found that the Articles of Union would not be breached by the House of Lords Bill if it were enacted. The bill did receive royal assent, and from 2000, hereditary peers have not had the automatic right to sit in Parliament. Scotland, however, does not remain entirely unrepresented, as a significant number of life peers are domiciled in Scotland.

=== Black v Chrétien (2001) ===
In 1999, the UK Prime Minister, Tony Blair, recommended a Canadian newspaper magnate, Conrad Black, to be raised to the peerage. Representatives of the Canadian Government indicated their approval, but immediately before Queen Elizabeth II could grant the peerage, the Prime Minister of Canada, Jean Chrétien, advised her not to elevate Black. Chrétien cited the Nickle Resolution, which ordered that an address be presented to the British Sovereign requesting that he not award "any title of honour or titular distinction." The resolution was passed by the Canadian House of Commons, but no address was ever presented. The Queen nevertheless chose to comply with Chrétien's advice.

Black then sued Prime Minister Chrétien for abuse of power, misfeasance in public office and negligence, and the Canadian Government for negligent misrepresentation. He requested the Ontario Court of Appeals to make three declarations, namely: that the Canadian Government had no right to advise the Queen on the conferral of a peerage on a dual citizen (which Black became), that the Prime Minister abused his power by requesting the Queen not to grant the peerage, and that the Government of Canada negligently misrepresented to him that, if he became a dual citizen and refrained from using his title in Canada, he could receive the peerage.

At the heart of the issue was the "honours prerogative," that is, the right of the Crown to grant dignities to its subjects. Theoretically, the honours prerogative may be exercised only by the sovereign or a representative thereof (in this case, the Governor-General of Canada), though in practice it is seldom utilised but on the advice of Ministers of the Crown. While many royal prerogatives may be questioned in court, the honours prerogative is non-justiciable. Therefore, if the Prime Minister was advising on the usage of the honours prerogative, his actions may not be reviewed in court. As John Laskin, a Justice of the Court of Appeals of Ontario, indicated, "The refusal to grant an honour is far removed from the refusal to grant a passport or a pardon, where important individual interests are at stake. Unlike the refusal of a peerage, the refusal of a passport or a pardon has real adverse consequences for the person affected." The court then refused to make the declarations sought by Black.

While the non-justiciability of the honours prerogative was affirmed, the decision did not address the issue as to what would occur in the event of conflict between ministers of the Crown. Though a single individual is Queen of both the United Kingdom and Canada, the Crowns of the nations are separate. As Noel Cox suggests,

"The Queen should act solely upon the advice of British ministers when awarding a British peerage. If her Canadian Prime Minister offers her advice, it is to her as Queen of Canada. As Queen of Canada she is powerless to prevent the conferring of a British title, though she could consult with herself, wearing her other hat, as it were."

Should Blair have chosen to insist upon the matter, the Queen would have elevated Black to a British peerage, the protestations of the Canadian Government notwithstanding. Indeed, in 2001, two Canadians—the Vice-Chancellor of Queen's University Belfast, George Bain, and a billionaire, Terence Matthews—were awarded knighthoods without consultation with Canadian authorities. Black himself was made Baron Black of Crossharbour after he renounced his Canadian citizenship in 2001.

== Statute law regulating peerages ==
- Appellate Jurisdiction Act 1876
- Life Peerages Act 1958
- Peerage Act 1963
- House of Lords Act 1999
- House of Lords (Hereditary Peers) Act 2026
