= Herbrand Russell, 11th Duke of Bedford =

English politician and peer (1858–1940)

His Grace The Duke of Bedford KG KBE DL FRS FSA
- Tenure: 23 March 1893 – 27 August 1940
- Other titles: 11th Marquess of Tavistock; 15th Earl of Bedford; 15th Baron Russell; 13th Baron Russell of Thornhaugh; 11th Baron Howland
- Born: 19 February 1858; London, Middlesex, England
- Died: 27 August 1940 (aged 82); Woburn, Bedfordshire, England
- Spouse: Mary du Caurroy Tribe (m. 1888; died 1937)
- Issue: Hastings Russell, 12th Duke of Bedford
- Parents: Francis Russell, 9th Duke of Bedford; Elizabeth Sackville-West

Herbrand Arthur Russell, 11th Duke of Bedford (19 February 1858 – 27 August 1940) was an English politician and peer. He was the son of Francis Russell, 9th Duke of Bedford, and his wife Lady Elizabeth Sackville-West, daughter of George Sackville-West, 5th Earl De La Warr. A noted naturalist, he is considered to be the chief importer of the invasive grey squirrel species to Britain.

== Military career ==
He was commissioned into the Grenadier Guards on 7 June 1879 as a Second lieutenant and was promoted to Lieutenant on 1 July 1881. He served with the 2nd Battalion in the Egyptian Campaign of 1882 and was at the Battle of Tel-el-Kebir. Afterwards he served as Aide-de-camp to the Earl of Dufferin, Viceroy of India, 1884–8. He resigned his commission in 1888.

He was commissioned as a Major in the part-time 3rd (Bedfordshire Militia) Battalion, Bedfordshire Regiment, on 1 October 1893, and promoted to Lieutenant-Colonel in command on 22 December 1897. He was granted the honorary rank of Colonel on 11 January 1902 . He retired from the command when the Militia was converted into the Special Reserve in June 1908 and was appointed Aide-de-Camp to the King. He came out of retirement on the outbreak of World War I in 1914 as colonel commanding the Bedfordshire Regiment Training Depot, for which he was Mentioned in despatches and created a Knight Commander of the British Empire (Military).

== Public duty ==
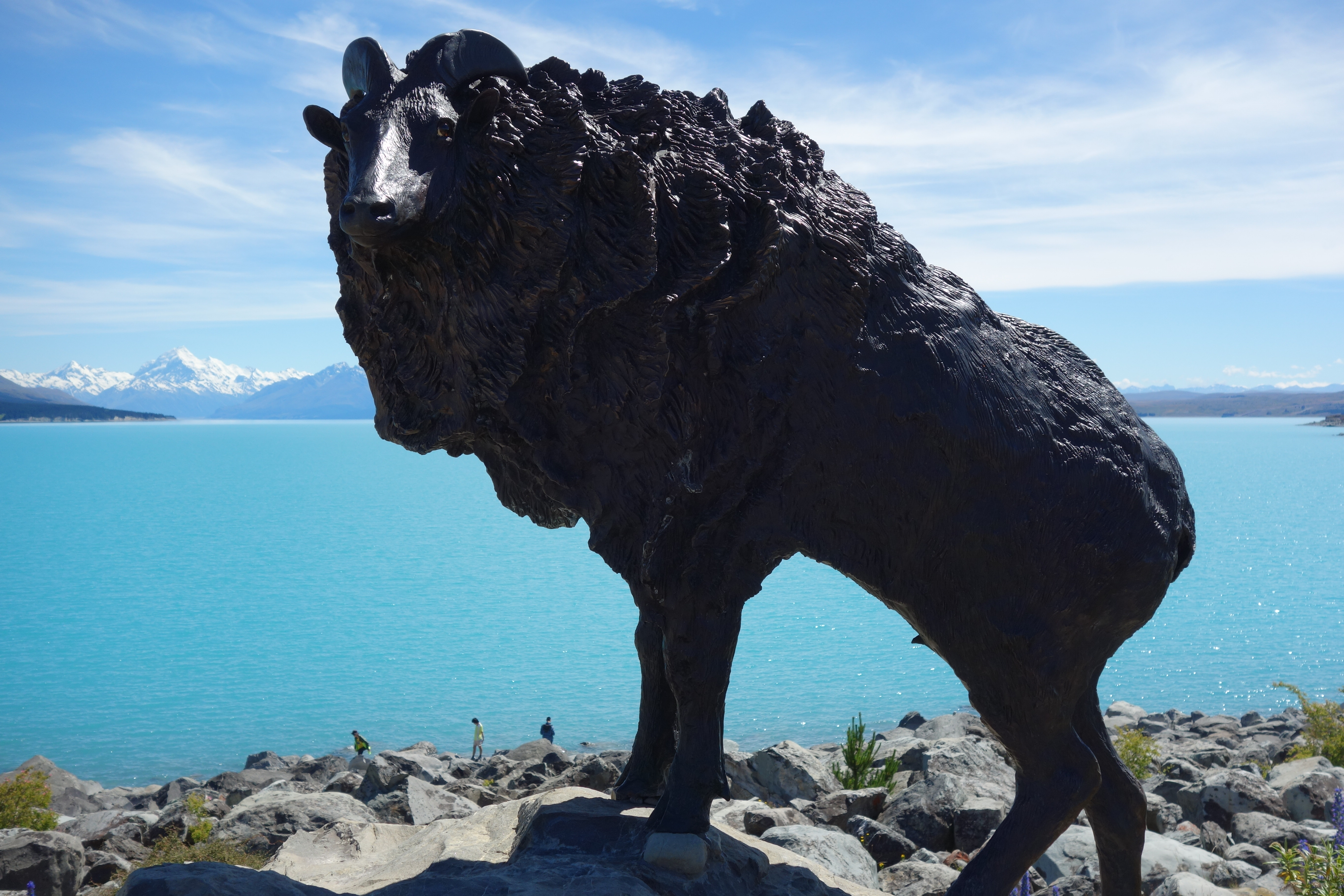
The Himalayan tahr sculpture unveiled in May 2014 at Lake Pukaki by Henrietta, Dowager Duchess of Bedford

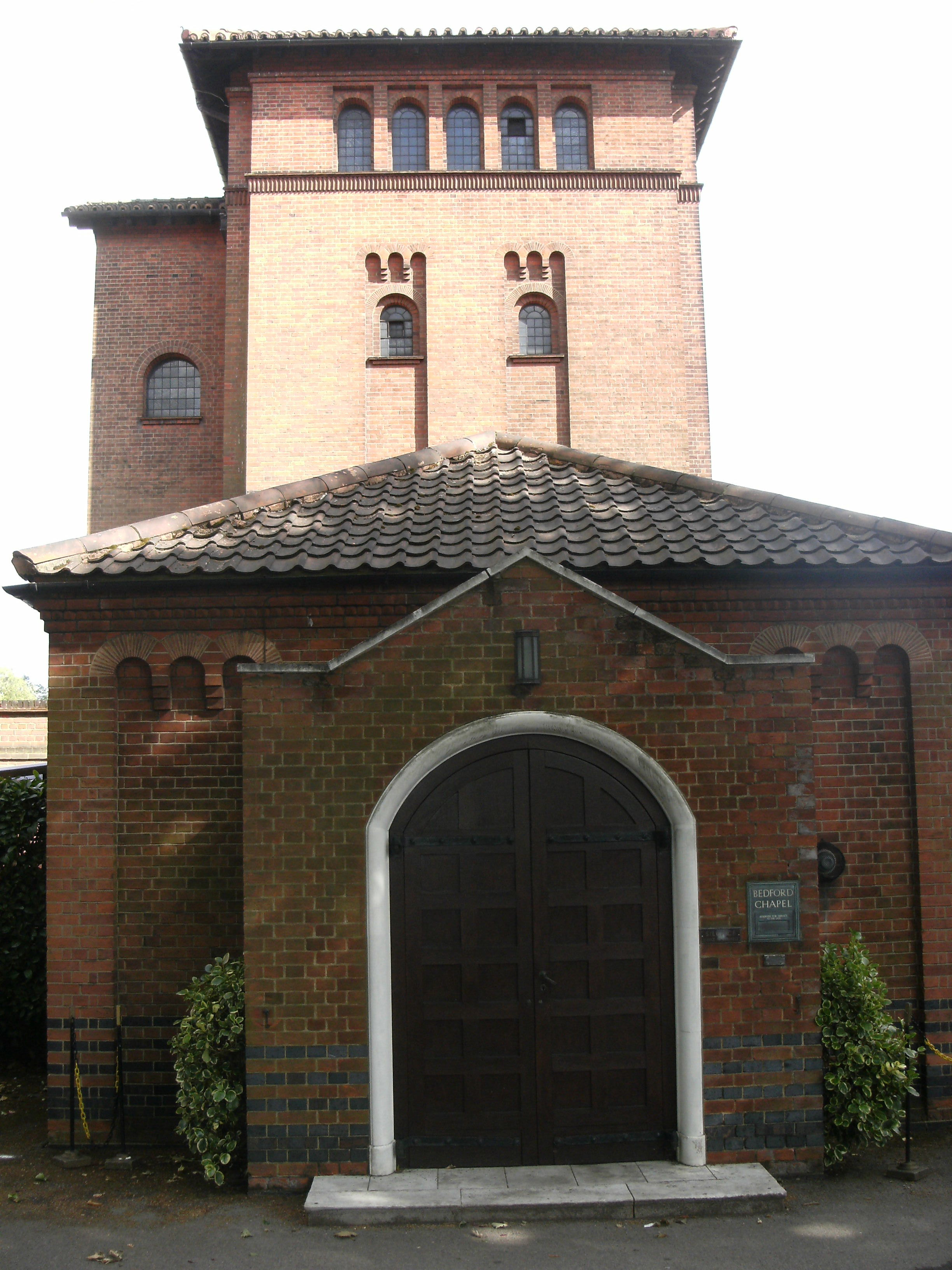
The Bedford Chapel at Golders Green Crematorium, London, where the 11th Duke of Bedford was cremated in 1940

The Duke of Bedford was chairman of Bedfordshire County Council from 1895 to 1928 and was Deputy Lieutenant of Bedfordshire. He held the office of Lord Lieutenant of Middlesex between 1898 and 1926, and was the first Mayor of Holborn in 1900.

He was President of the Zoological Society of London from 1899 to 1936, and was concerned with animal preservation throughout his life. According to Jane Goodall in her book Hope for Animals, the Duke was instrumental in saving the milu (or Père David's deer), which was already extinct by 1900 in its native China. He acquired the few remaining deer from European zoos and nurtured a herd of them at Woburn Abbey. He gifted Himalayan tahr to the New Zealand government in 1903; of the three males and three females, five survived the journey and were released near the Hermitage Hotel at Mount Cook Village. He sent a further shipment in 1909 of six males and two females. Himalayan tahr are near-threatened in their native India and Nepal, but are so numerous in New Zealand's Southern Alps that they are hunted recreationally. A statue of a Himalayan tahr was unveiled in May 2014 at Lake Pukaki and dedicated by Henrietta, Dowager Duchess of Bedford.

In the 1890s he was responsible for the import of a number of North American grey squirrels which he introduced to Woburn Park. He also gifted many to other estates across the UK and introduced a group to Regents Park, the ancestors of the majority of squirrels in London today. The species proved to be highly invasive and has almost entirely wiped out the native red squirrel in most of the country.

Bedford was also interested in horticulture, through the orchards at the Woburn estate, and along with Spencer Pickering performed early work into what would now be described as allelopathy between different plant species, the results of which can be found in academic publications.

He was also a trustee of the British Museum and president of the Imperial Cancer Research Fund

Bedford served as president of the Cremation Society of Great Britain from 1921 to his death in 1940. He had the original cremator from Woking Crematorium moved and fitted inside the Bedford Chapel, a new chapel at Golders Green Crematorium, where he was himself cremated. His ashes are buried in the 'Bedford Chapel' at St. Michael’s Church, Chenies.

== Family ==
He married Mary du Caurroy Tribe, on 30/31 January 1888 at Barrackpore, British Raj. She was appointed DBE and died in an aviation accident in 1937, three years before her husband. They had one child, Hastings William Sackville Russell, 12th Duke of Bedford (1888–1953).

Herbrand Russell took as his ward the illegitimate Anglo-Indian daughter of his older brother, George Russell, 10th Duke of Bedford. The daughter was known to have lived with the family until she was married and frequently visited them afterwards.

== Honours ==
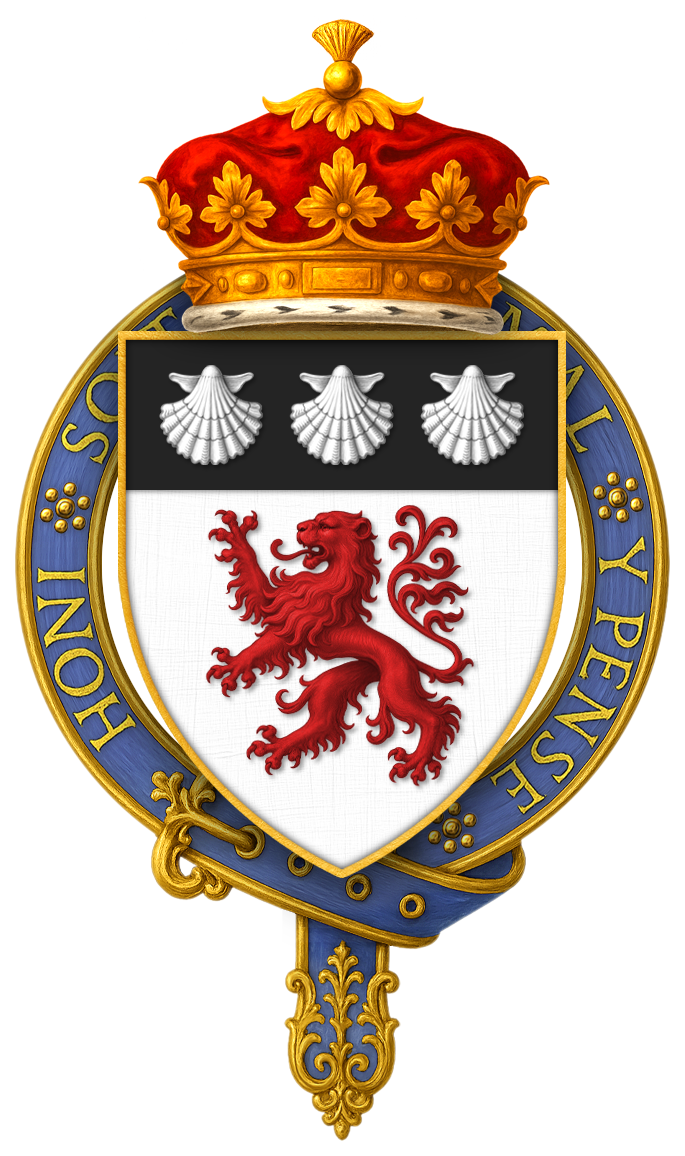
Garter-encircled arms of Herbrand Russell, 11th Duke of Bedford, KG, KBE, DL, FRS, FSA

The Duke of Bedford was invested as a Knight of Grace of the Order of St John (KGStJ), as a Fellow of the Society of Arts (FSA) on 14 March 1901, as Knight Companion of the Order of the Garter (KG) on 30 May 1902, as Knight Commander of the Order of the British Empire (KBE (Military)) in 1919, and as a Fellow of the Royal Society (FRS) in 1908. He was made an Honorary Doctor of Law (LL.D.) by Edinburgh University in 1906. He was made an honorary Freeman of Holborn in 1931. He received the gold medal of the Zoological Society of London in 1936.

His grandson Ian Russell, 13th Duke of Bedford describes him as follows: "A selfish, forbidding man, with a highly developed sense of public duty and ducal responsibility, he lived a cold, aloof existence, isolated from the outside world by a mass of servants, sycophants and an eleven-mile wall." In conjunction with his son Hastings Russell, 12th Duke of Bedford, he developed plans to protect the Bedford fortune from the British tax regime. However, he died too soon for these to come to fruition and the only result was to involve his grandson in enormous difficulties in obtaining access to the family properties.

Herbrand and Hastings Russell feature largely in the 13th Duke's memoir, A Silver-Plated Spoon (World Books, 1959).

== Ancestry ==
Ancestors of Herbrand Russell, 11th Duke of Bedford

16. Francis Russell, Marquess of Tavistock
8. John Russell, 6th Duke of Bedford
17. Lady Elizabeth Keppel
4. Lord George Russell
18. George Byng, 4th Viscount Torrington
9. Hon. Georgiana Byng
19. Lady Lucy Boyle
2. Francis Russell, 9th Duke of Bedford
20. John Rawdon, 1st Earl of Moira
10. Hon. John Rawdon
21. Elizabeth Hastings, 16th Baroness Botreaux
5. Elizabeth Rawdon
22. Joseph Hall-Stevenson
11. Frances Hall-Stevenson
23. Anne Foster
1. Herbrand Russell, 11th Duke of Bedford
24. John West, 2nd Earl De La Warr
12. John West, 4th Earl De La Warr
25. Mary Wynyard
6. George Sackville-West, 5th Earl De La Warr
26. Henry Lyell
13. Catherine Lyell
27. Catherine Allestrie
3. Lady Elizabeth Sackville-West
28. Lord John Sackville
14. John Sackville, 3rd Duke of Dorset
29. Lady Frances Leveson-Gower
7. Elizabeth Sackville, 1st Baroness Buckhurst
30. Sir Charles Cope, 2nd Baronet
15. Arabella Diana Cope
31. Catherine Bishopp

== Bibliography ==
- Burke's Peerage, Baronetage and Knightage, 100th Edn, London, 1953.
- Jane Goodall, with Thane Maynard and Gail Hudson, Hope for Animals and Their World: How endangered species are being rescued from the brink, 2009, Grand Central Publishing

Honorary titles
Preceded by The Earl of Strafford	Lord Lieutenant of Middlesex; 1898–1926	Succeeded by The Lord Revelstoke
Peerage of England
Preceded by William Russell	Duke of Bedford; 1893–1940	Succeeded by Hastings Russell
