= Elizabeth Sackville-West =

Elizabeth Sackville-West may refer to:

- Elizabeth Russell, Duchess of Bedford (1818–1897)
- Elizabeth Sackville-West, Countess De La Warr (1795–1870)
