= Reginald Sackville, 7th Earl De La Warr =

British clergyman and landowner (1817-1896)

The Reverend and Right Honourable The Earl De La Warr
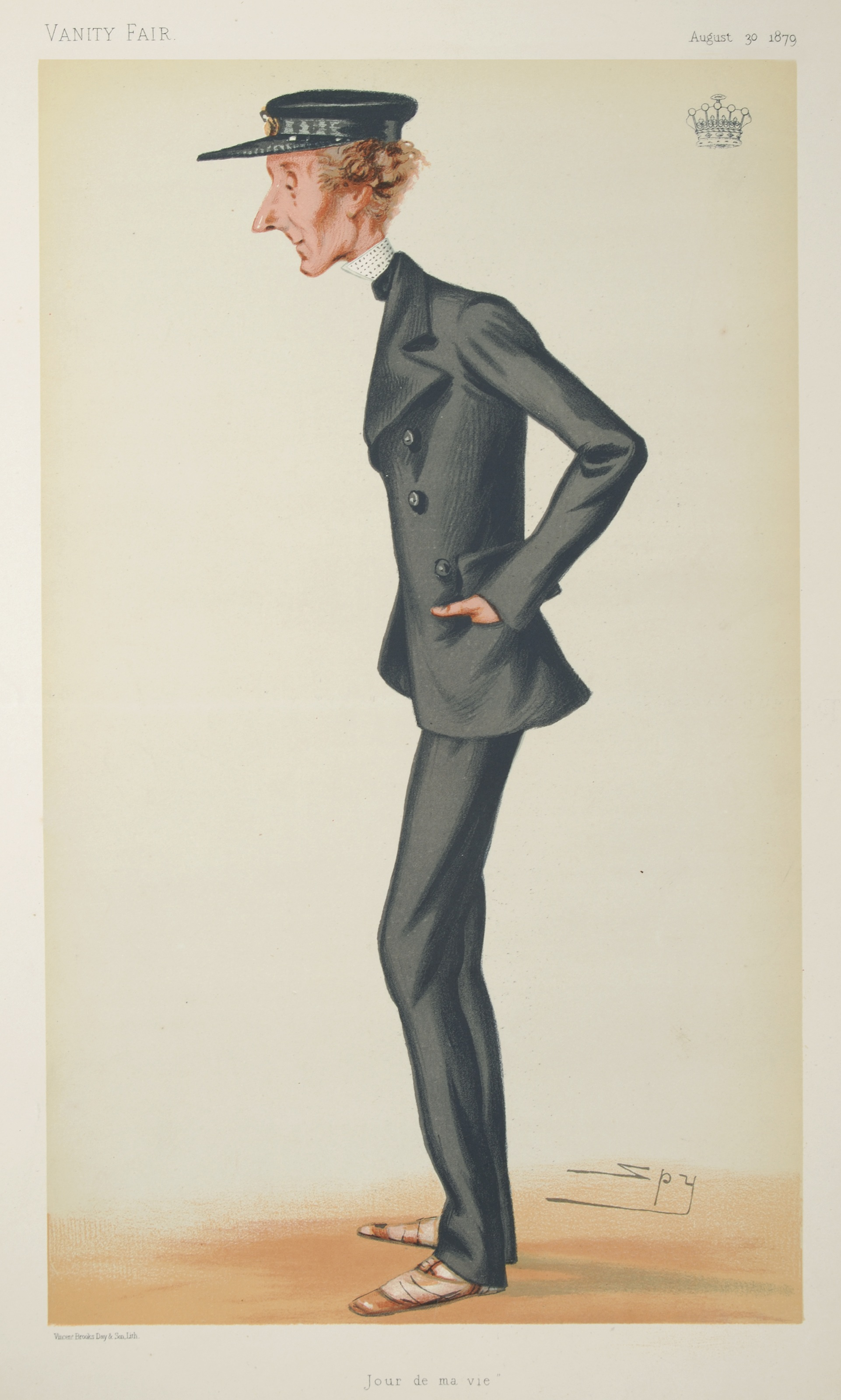
- Reginald Sackville, Vanity Fair
- Born: 21 February 1817
- Died: 5 January 1896 (aged 78)
- Occupations: Clergyman and landowner
- Known for: Development of Bexhill-on-Sea
- Spouse: Constance Baillie-Cochrane (m. 1867)
- Children: 5; including Gilbert
- Parents: George Sackville-West, 5th Earl De La Warr (father); Lady Elizabeth Sackville (mother)
- Relatives: John Sackville, 3rd Duke of Dorset (maternal grandfather); George West, Viscount Cantelupe (brother); Charles Sackville-West, 6th Earl De La Warr (brother); Elizabeth Russell, Duchess of Bedford (sister); Mortimer Sackville-West, 1st Baron Sackville (brother); Lionel Sackville-West, 2nd Baron Sackville (brother)

Reginald Windsor Sackville, 7th Earl De La Warr (21 February 1817 – 5 January 1896), styled The Honourable Reginald West until 1843, as The Honourable Reginald Sackville-West between 1843 and 1870 and known as The Lord Buckhurst between 1870 and 1873, was a British clergyman and landowner.

== Background ==
Sackville was the third son of George Sackville-West, 5th Earl De La Warr, and Lady Elizabeth Sackville, Baroness Buckhurst in her own right, daughter and heiress of John Sackville, 3rd Duke of Dorset. He was the brother of George West, Viscount Cantelupe, Charles Sackville-West, 6th Earl De La Warr, Elizabeth Russell, Duchess of Bedford, Mortimer Sackville-West, 1st Baron Sackville, and Lionel Sackville-West, 2nd Baron Sackville. Born Reginald West, he assumed in 1843 by Royal licence the additional surname of Sackville, and (by royal licence) on 24 April 1871 the surname of Sackville only.

== Public life ==
Sackville succeeded his mother as Baron Buckhurst in 1870 according to a special remainder in the letters patent (the intention was that the barony of Buckhurst should always be separate from the earldom of De La Warr). Three years later he succeeded in the earldom after his elder brother Charles died by suicide. His younger brother Mortimer then claimed the barony of Buckhurst. However, Mortimer's claim was rejected by the House of Lords.

Lord De La Warr was an active member of the House of Lords. Concerned with the growing number of railroad accidents and casualties due to safety measures not being regulated by the government, but rather left up to the different railroad companies to ensure the safety of their passengers without much regulation. Therefore in 1873 he introduced a Bill to the House of Lords which would have made block signaling mandatory on all railroad lines. He was however voted down.

== Family ==
Lord De La Warr married Constance Mary Elizabeth Baillie-Cochrane, daughter of Alexander Baillie-Cochrane, 1st Baron Lamington, in 1867. They had several children, including Lady Edeline Sackville, wife of Lord Strickland. Lord De La Warr died in January 1896, aged 78, and was succeeded in the earldom by his only surviving son, Gilbert. The Countess De la Warr married as her second husband Reverend Paul Williams Wyatt in 1902. She died in July 1929, aged 83.

Lord De La Warr, alongside his successor the 8th Earl, played a significant role in the development of Bexhill-on-Sea, contributing to its transformation from a small rural village into a growing seaside resort.

Peerage of Great Britain
Preceded by Charles Sackville-West	Earl De La Warr; 1873–1896	Succeeded by Gilbert George Reginald Sackville
Peerage of the United Kingdom
Preceded by Elizabeth Sackville-West	Baron Buckhurst; 1870–1896	Succeeded by Gilbert George Reginald Sackville
