= Manor Ground =

Manor Ground may refer to:

- Manor Ground (Oxford), home stadium of Oxford United FC between 1925 and 2001
- Manor Ground (Plumstead), home stadium of Woolwich Arsenal FC between 1888 & 1890, and 1893 & 1913
- Manor Ground (Bexhill-on-Sea), a cricket ground at Bexhill-on-Sea, Sussex
