= Charles Sackville-West =

Charles Sackville-West may refer to:

- Charles Sackville-West, 6th Earl De La Warr (1815–1873), British soldier
- Charles Sackville-West, 4th Baron Sackville (1870–1962), British Army general and peer
