= Gilbert Sackville, 8th Earl De La Warr =

English politician, landowner, soldier, and cricketer (1869–1915)

Major The Right Honourable The Earl De La Warr JP DL
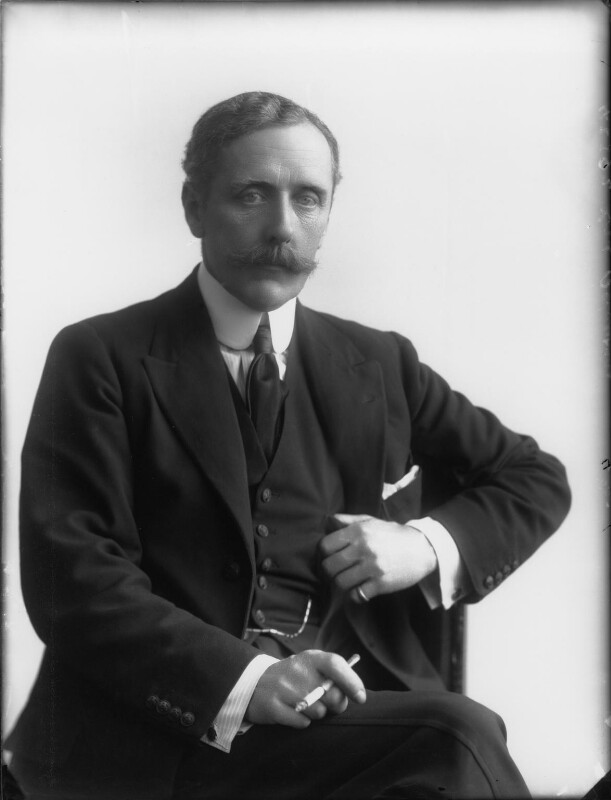
- De La Warr in 1913
- Born: 22 March 1869
- Died: 16 December 1915 (aged 46); At sea off Sicily
- Education: Charterhouse School
- Occupations: landowner, politician and soldier
- Spouse: Lady Muriel Agnes Brassey (m. 1890; div. 1902)
- Children: 3
- Parents: Reginald Sackville, 7th Earl De La Warr (father); Constance Baillie-Cochrane (mother)
- Relatives: Alexander Baillie-Cochrane, 1st Baron Lamington (maternal grandfather); Herbrand Sackville, 9th Earl De La Warr (son); Lady Idina Sackville (daughter)
- Military career
- Allegiance: United Kingdom
- Branch: British Army
- Service years: 1914-1915
- Rank: Major
- Unit: Royal Sussex Regiment
- Conflicts: World War I; Gallipoli campaign

Gilbert George Reginald Sackville, 8th Earl De La Warr (22 March 1869 – 16 December 1915), styled The Honourable Gilbert Sackville until 1890 and Viscount Cantelupe between 1890 and 1896, was a British landowner, politician and soldier.

== Background ==
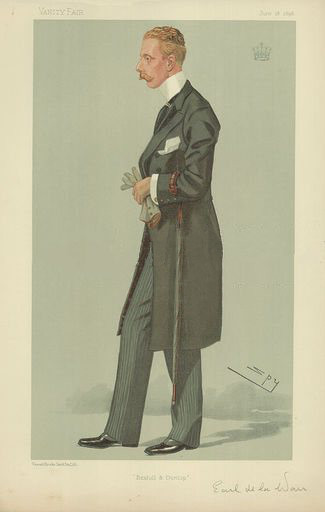
"Bexhill and Dunlop". Caricature by Spy published in Vanity Fair in 1896

De La Warr was the second but only surviving son of Reginald Sackville, 7th Earl De La Warr, by Constance Mary Elizabeth Baillie-Cochrane, daughter of Alexander Baillie-Cochrane, 1st Baron Lamington. He was educated at Charterhouse School. He became heir apparent to the earldom in 1890 when his elder brother, Lionel Charles Cranfield Sackville, Lord Cantelupe, died without issue in a boating accident on Belfast Lough aged twenty-one. De La Warr, now taking the name Lord Cantelupe as a courtesy title, twice played cricket at first-class level during the 1890s, in the second match captaining a team under the name "Earl de la Warr's XI" against the touring Australians at his private manor cricket ground. His brother-in-law, Freeman Thomas, also played at first-class level.

== Public life ==
Lord Cantelupe was made a Deputy Lieutenant of Sussex in 1891. He became a second lieutenant in the 2nd (Cinque Ports) (or Eastern) Division of the Royal Artillery in 1891, was promoted to lieutenant in 1893 and to captain in 1894. In January 1896 he succeeded his father in the earldom, aged 25. He resigned his army commission later that year. However, he was re-appointed captain in the 2nd Cinque Ports Division in 1900 and fought in the Second Boer War, where he was wounded at Vryheid. He was promoted to major in 1901 but once again resigned his commission in 1902.

In 1903 and 1904 De La Warr was Mayor of Bexhill-on-Sea, Sussex, a town mainly owned by the Sackville family. He was also a County Alderman and Justice of the Peace of Sussex. He served in the First World War but relinquished his commission as a temporary major in The Southdown Battalion of the Royal Sussex Regiment in November 1914. He later fought in the war as a lieutenant in the Royal Navy Volunteer Reserve and died at Messina, Sicily while on active service on 16 December 1915.

== Family ==
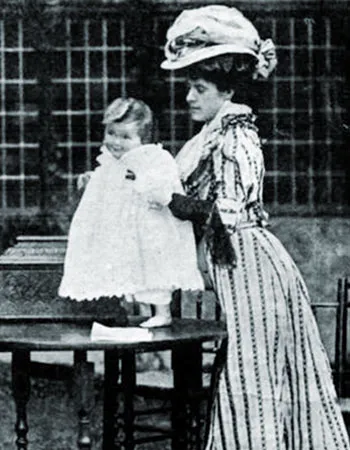
Avice Ela Muriel Sackville with her mother Muriel Brassey, c. 1900

Lord De La Warr married firstly Lady Muriel Agnes Brassey, daughter of Thomas Brassey, 1st Earl Brassey, and Anna Allnutt, in 1890, spending their honeymoon at Norris Castle on the Isle of Wight. They had one son, Herbrand Edward Dundonald Brassey Sackville, and two daughters, Lady Idina Sackville and Lady Avice Ela Muriel Sackville, wife of Sir Stewart Menzies. Lord and Lady De La Warr were divorced in 1902. Lady De La Warr died in August 1930.

Lord De La Warr married secondly Hilda Mary Clavering Tredcroft, daughter of Colonel Charles Lennox Tredcroft, in 1903. There were no children from this marriage.

He died at sea in December 1915 from pneumonia, aged 46, while on active service in the Dardanelles in the First World War. His only son Herbrand succeeded in the title.

In 1916, De La Warr was cited posthumously in a divorce case in which Charles Skarratt, then assistant manager of the Alhambra Theatre, sued his American wife Mabel Loeb for divorce on the grounds of her adultery with the Earl between 1913 and 1915. The case was proven. The lady had been visiting the Earl so often at his rooms in Belgrave Mansions that eventually he had been asked to leave.

The second Lady De la Warr married secondly John William Dennis, MP for Birmingham Deritend, in 1922. She died in 1963.

== Pearl fishing mis-adventure ==
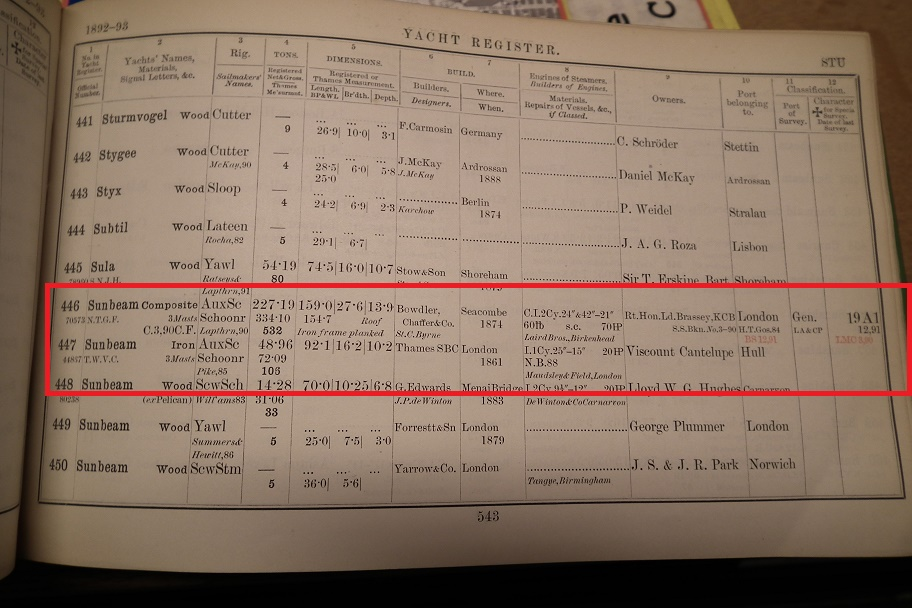
Lloyds Yacht Register 1892-93. Entries show two schooners named Sunbeam— one owned by Lord Brassey and the other by his son-in-law, Viscount Cantelupe

In 1892 a ship named Sunbeam, owned by Viscount Cantelupe, was on a pearl fishing expedition on the northwest coast of Australia. The ship was lost and the legend is that the Aboriginal people called upon serpent spirits to sink the vessel. This was in revenge after the crew, who had been allowed to "borrow" some Aboriginal women, failed to return them at the agreed time. The story caused some confusion in the newspapers at the time because the Viscount's father-in-law, Thomas Brassey, was the owner of the famous steam yacht Sunbeam RYS and it was incorrectly assumed that this was the ship that sunk.

Peerage of Great Britain
Preceded by Reginald Windsor Sackville	Earl De La Warr; 1896–1915	Succeeded by Herbrand Edward Dundonald Brassey Sackville
