= Thomas Sackville =

Thomas Sackville may refer to:

- Thomas Sackville I (c.1336 – 1406), MP, see Knights of Buckinghamshire 1377–1394
- Thomas Sackville II (died 1432), in 1394 MP for Sussex (UK Parliament constituency)
- Thomas Sackville, 1st Earl of Dorset (1536–1608), English statesman, poet and playwright
- Tom Sackville (born 1950), British Conservative Member of Parliament
- Thomas Sackville (1622-1693), English politician of Sedlescombe, Sussex, MP in the 17th century
