= George West, Viscount Cantelupe =

British politician

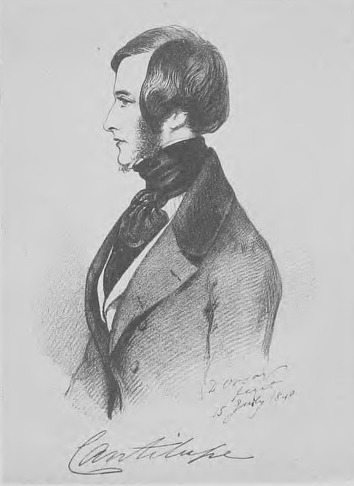
- Born: 25/26 April 1814
- Died: 25 June 1850
- Occupation: Politician
- Parent(s): George Sackville-West, 5th Earl De La Warr; Elizabeth Sackville-West, Countess De La Warr
- Position held: member of the 13th Parliament of the United Kingdom (1837–1840)

George John Frederick West, Viscount Cantelupe (25/26 April 1814 – 25 June 1850) was a British politician.

Styled Viscount Cantelupe from birth, he was the eldest son of George Sackville-West, 5th Earl De La Warr, by Lady Elizabeth Sackville, daughter of John Sackville, 3rd Duke of Dorset. He was the elder brother of Major-General Charles Sackville-West, 6th Earl De La Warr, Mortimer Sackville-West, 1st Baron Sackville, Lionel Sackville-West, 2nd Baron Sackville and Elizabeth Russell, Duchess of Bedford. He was educated at Christ Church, Oxford.

Lord Cantelupe served in the Grenadier Guards, reaching the rank of lieutenant. In 1837 he was returned to Parliament for Helston, a seat he held until 1840, and then represented Lewes until 1841. He died unmarried of rheumatic fever in late June 1850, aged 36, predeceasing his father. His younger brother Charles eventually succeeded in the earldom.

Parliament of the United Kingdom
Preceded by Lord James Townshend	Member of Parliament for Helston; 1837–1840	Succeeded by John Basset
Preceded by Sir Charles Blunt, Bt; Henry FitzRoy	Member of Parliament for Lewes; 1840–1841; With: Henry FitzRoy	Succeeded by Summers Harford; Sir Howard Elphinstone, Bt
