= List of vice-chamberlains to British royal consorts =

Below is an incomplete list of those who have served as Vice-Chamberlain to British royal consorts.

== Vice-chamberlains to Caroline, Princess of Wales, later Queen Caroline (1714–1737) ==
- 1727: Sir Andrew Fountaine
- 1727–1728: Thomas Smith
- 1728–1733: Lord William Beauclerk
- 1733–1734: Lord William Hamilton
- 1734–1737: Lord Robert Montagu

== Vice-chamberlains to Augusta, Princess of Wales (1736–1748) ==
- 1736–1772: Sir William Irby, 2nd Baronet (Lord Chamberlain 1748–1772, Baron Boston from 1761)

== Vice-chamberlains to Queen Charlotte (1761–1818) ==
- 1761–1766: John West, Viscount Cantelupe
- 1766–1768: Hon. Robert Brudenell
- 1768–1780: Charles FitzRoy, 1st Baron Southampton
- 1780–1782: Vacant
- 1782–1792: Hon. Stephen Digby
- 1792–1801: William Price
- 1801–1818: Col Edward Disbrowe MP

== Vice-chamberlains to Queen Adelaide (1830–1837) ==
- 1830: Hon. Frederick Cathcart
- 1830–1837: Hon. William Ashley

== Vice-chamberlains to Alexandra, Princess of Wales, later Queen Alexandra (1873–1925) ==
- 1901–1922: Archibald Acheson, 4th Earl of Gosford

== Vice-chamberlains to Mary, Princess of Wales, later Queen Mary (1901–1953) ==
- 1910–1012: Beilby Lawley, 3rd Baron Wenlock

== See also ==
- Vice-Chamberlain of the Household
