= Mary Stanley, Countess of Derby =

English grande dame and political hostess

Mary Catherine Stanley
- Countess of Derby
- Born: Mary Catherine Sackville-West; 23 July 1824
- Died: 6 December 1900 (aged 76)
- Spouses: James Gascoyne-Cecil, 2nd Marquess of Salisbury (m. 1847; died 1868) Edward Henry Stanley, 15th Earl of Derby (m. 1870; died 1893)
- Issue: 5, including Mary Arabella
- Father: George Sackville-West, 5th Earl De La Warr
- Mother: Lady Elizabeth Sackville

Mary Stanley, Countess of Derby (previously known as Mary Cecil, Marchioness of Salisbury, née Lady Mary Sackville-West; 23 July 1824 – 6 December 1900) was an English grande dame and political hostess.

== Family ==
Daughter of George Sackville-West, 5th Earl De La Warr. Sixth of his nine children.

She married firstly James Gascoyne-Cecil, 2nd Marquess of Salisbury in 1847 with whom she had five children:

- Lord Sackville Arthur Cecil (16 March 1848 – 29 January 1898)
- Lady Mary Arabella Arthur Cecil (26 April 1850 – 18 August 1903), married Alan Stewart, 10th Earl of Galloway
- Lady Margaret Elizabeth Cecil (1850 – 11 March 1919)
- Lord Arthur Cecil (3 July 1851 – 16 July 1913)
- Lieutenant-Colonel Lord Lionel Cecil (21 March 1853 – 13 January 1901)

Lord Salisbury died in April 1868, aged 76 and was succeeded by his son from his first marriage.

Lady Mary remarried Edward Henry Stanley, 15th Earl of Derby in 1870.

== Politics ==
She was heavily involved in Victorian politics. Her father was a friend of the Duchess of Kent which meant she was part of Victoria's circle while growing up. As a result of her strong family connections, while she was married to the marquess of Salisbury, she turned their house, Hatfield House, into a strong Tory base. Frequent visitors to the home were Lord Carnarvon, Disraeli, and Hugh Cairns.

After the death of her first husband and her second marriage she lost Hatfield but continued her strong presence in British politics. She influenced Cabinet members and foreign ambassadors at times a matter of some concern. She was rumoured to have leaked confidential information to the Russian Ambassador Count Shuvalov, though the certainty of this is unclear. However, Disraeli nonetheless used the idea to alienate Lord Derby amongst the cabinet colleagues, in an effort to gather support for a firmer approach against Russia in the Russo-Turkish War (1877–1878). Jennifer Davey regards Lady Derby's political involvement in the Eastern Crisis to have almost destroyed her husband's career, who resigned twice as Foreign Secretary between January and March 1878 before defecting to the Liberal Party.

Lady Derby was also in regular correspondence with her friends who included Charles Darwin, the Duke of Wellington and Sir Henry Irving.

Her letters were gathered in a book. Her papers are also available through the national archives.

She was mentioned by Virginia Woolf in Orlando: A Biography.
