= Richard Sackville =

Richard Sackville may refer to:

- Sir Richard Sackville (escheator) (died 1566), English administrator and MP for Chichester
- Richard Sackville, 3rd Earl of Dorset (1589–1624), Lord Lieutenant of Sussex, first husband of Lady Anne Clifford
- Richard Sackville, 5th Earl of Dorset (1622–1677), English politician, Lord Lieutenant of Middlesex, and Sussex
- Richard Sackville (by 1501 – 1545 or 1546), MP for Arundel
