= List of lord chamberlains to British royal consorts =

Below is an incomplete list of those who have served as lord chamberlains to British royal consorts.

With the exception of Diana, Princess of Wales, the office has been created for the Princess of Wales and continued if and when they become queen consort. Also, the office is not created for male consorts.

== Lord chamberlains to Queen Henrietta Maria (1625–1669) ==
- 1628–?: Edward Sackville, 4th Earl of Dorset

== Lord chamberlains to Queen Catherine (1662–1705) ==
- 1662–1665: Philip Stanhope, 2nd Earl of Chesterfield
- 1665–1674?: Henry Hyde, Viscount Cornbury
- 1675–1676: Francisco de Melo
- 1676–1680: Thomas Butler, 6th Earl of Ossory
- 1680–1705: Louis de Duras, 2nd Earl of Feversham

== Lord chamberlains to Queen Mary (1685–1688) ==
- 1685–1688: Sidney Godolphin, 1st Baron Godolphin

== Lord chamberlains to Caroline, Princess of Wales, later Queen Caroline (1714–1737) ==
- 1714–1717: Scroop Egerton, 4th Earl of Bridgewater
- 1717–1737: Henry de Nassau d'Auverquerque, 1st Earl of Grantham

== Lord chamberlains to Augusta, Princess of Wales (1748–1772) ==
- 1736–1772: Sir William Irby, 2nd Baronet (Vice-Chamberlain 1736–1748, Baron Boston from 1761)

== Lord chamberlains to Queen Charlotte (1761–1818) ==
- 1761–1762: Robert Montagu, 3rd Duke of Manchester
- 1762–1763: Hugh Percy, 2nd Earl of Northumberland
- 1763–1768: Simon Harcourt, 1st Earl Harcourt
- 1768–1777: John West, 2nd Earl De La Warr
- 1777–1780: Francis Osborne, Marquess of Carmarthen
- 1780–1792: Thomas Brudenell-Bruce, 1st Earl of Ailesbury
- 1792–1818: George Douglas, 16th Earl of Morton

== Lord chamberlains to Queen Adelaide (1830–1837) ==
- 1830–1831: Richard Curzon-Howe, 1st Earl Howe
- 1831–1833: Vacant
- 1833–1834: William Feilding, 7th Earl of Denbigh
- 1834–1837: Richard Curzon-Howe, 1st Earl Howe

== Lord chamberlains to Alexandra, Princess of Wales, later Queen Alexandra (1873–1925) ==
- 1873–1903: Charles Colville, 1st Baron Colville of Culross (Viscount Colville of Culross from 1902)
- 1903–1925: Richard Curzon, 4th Earl Howe

== Lord chamberlains to Mary, Princess of Wales, later Queen Mary (1901–1953) ==
- 1901–1922: Anthony Ashley-Cooper, 9th Earl of Shaftesbury
- 1922–1947: Charles Paget, 6th Marquess of Anglesey
- 1947–1953: Vacant?

== Lord chamberlains to Queen Elizabeth, later Queen Elizabeth, The Queen Mother (1937–2002) ==
- 1937–1965: David Ogilvy, 12th Earl of Airlie
- 1965–1992: Simon Ramsay, 16th Earl of Dalhousie
- 1992–2002: Robert Lindsay, 29th Earl of Crawford

== See also ==
- Lord Chamberlain
  - List of Lord Chamberlains
