= John West, 2nd Earl De La Warr =

British Army officer, peer and courtier

Lieutenant-General The Right Honourable The Earl De La Warr
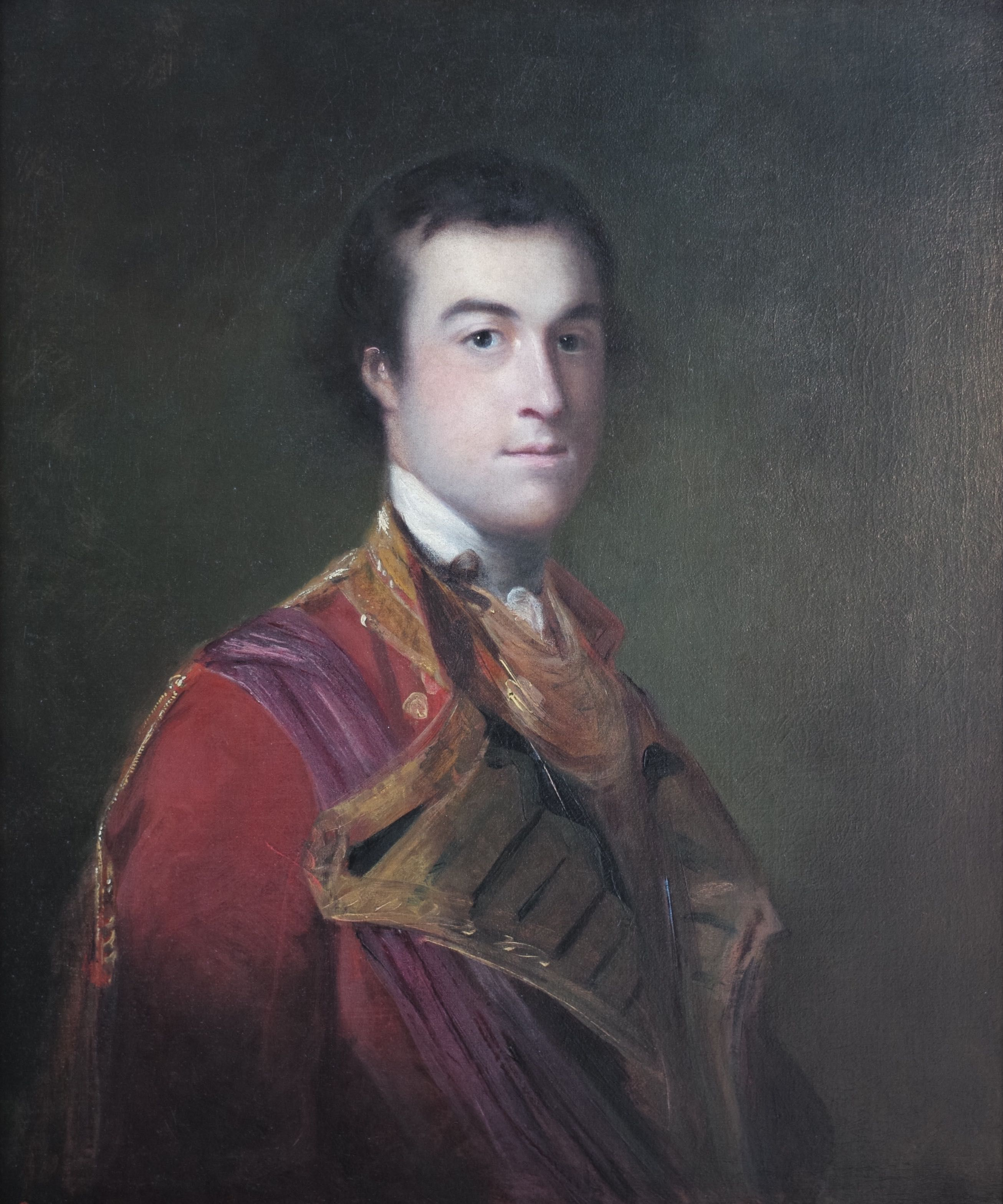
- Portrait by Sir Joshua Reynolds

Lord Chamberlain to Queen Charlotte
- In office 1768–1777
- Preceded by: The Earl Harcourt
- Succeeded by: Marquess of Carmarthen

Master of the Horse to Queen Charlotte
- In office 1766–1768
- Preceded by: The Duke of Ancaster and Kesteven
- Succeeded by: The Duke of Beaufort

Vice Chamberlain to Queen Charlotte
- In office 1761–1766
- Preceded by: New office
- Succeeded by: Robert Brudenell

Personal details
- Born: John West; 9 May 1729
- Died: 22 November 1777 (aged 48) Mayfair, London
- Spouse: Mary Wynyard (m. 1756)
- Children: 5, including William, John, Frederick
- Parent(s): John West, 1st Earl De La Warr; Lady Charlotte MacCarthy
- Relatives: Edward Pery Buckley (grandson)

John West, 2nd Earl De La Warr (9 May 1729 – 22 November 1777), styled Viscount Cantelupe from 1761 to 1766, was a British Army officer, peer and courtier.

== Early life ==
Born The Honourable John West, he was the son of John West, 7th Baron De La Warr and his first wife, the former Lady Charlotte MacCarthy (1700–1734/5). His younger brother was George Augustus West (who married Lady Mary Grey, eldest daughter of Harry Grey, 4th Earl of Stamford and Lady Mary Booth, only daughter of George Booth, 2nd Earl of Warrington). His two sisters were Lady Henrietta Cecilia West (the wife of Gen. James Johnston) and Lady Diana West (the wife of Lt.-Gen. Sir James John Clavering). After the death of his mother, his father remarried to Anne Neville, Lady Bergavenny (widow of George Neville, 1st Baron Bergavenny), daughter of sea captain Nehemiah Walker, in June 1744.

His father was the only son of John West, 6th Baron De La Warr and the former Margaret Freeman (the daughter and heiress of John Freeman, merchant, of London). His mother was the only daughter of Donough MacCarthy, 4th Earl of Clancarty, an Irish-Gaelic nobleman, and Lady Elizabeth Spencer (second daughter of Robert Spencer, 2nd Earl of Sunderland).

== Career ==
In 1746, West entered the army as an ensign in the 3rd Infantry Guards, rising to Lt.-Col., with the 1st Troop of Horse Guards 1755 and to colonel in 1758. From 1760 to 1761, he served as aide-de-camp to the King George III and was promoted to major general in 1761. In 1761, West's father was created Earl De La Warr and Viscount Cantelupe, enabling West to use the latter as a courtesy title. From 1761 to 1766, Cantelupe was Vice to Chamberlain to Queen Charlotte and he was Captain and Colonel of the 1st Troop Horse Grenadier Guards from 1763 to 1766.

After inheriting his father's titles in 1766, he became Master of the Horse to Queen Charlotte and Captain and Colonel of His Majesty's Own Troop of Horse Guards, serving in both roles until his death in 1777. In 1768, he became Lord Chamberlain to Queen Charlotte and in 1770, he was promoted to lieutenant general of the British Army.

== Personal life ==
On 8 August 1756, West married Mary Wynyard (d. 1784), daughter of Lt.-Gen. John Wynyard and the former Catherine Allestrec. Together, they were the parents of two daughters and three sons, including:

- William Augustus West, 3rd Earl De La Warr (1757–1783), who died unmarried.
- John Richard West, 4th Earl De La Warr (1758–1795), who married Catherine Lyell, daughter of Henry Lyell, a Swedish nobleman who had emigrated to England.
- Hon. Frederick West (1767–1852), who married Maria Myddelton, sister and co-heiress of Richard Myddelton and second daughter of Richard Myddelton of Chirk Castle and Elizabeth Rushout (daughter of Sir John Rushout, Bt, Treasurer of the Navy) in 1798. She died in 1843.
- Lady Georgiana West (d. 1832), who married Edward Buckley and mother of Edward Pery Buckley, MP for Salisbury.
- Lady Matilda West (d. 1843), who married her first-cousin, Gen. Henry Wynyard, Commander-in-Chief, Scotland.

Lord De La Warr died in Audley Square in Mayfair, London on 22 November 1777 and was buried in St. Margaret's, Westminster on 30 November that year. His titles passed to his eldest son, William.

Court offices
Preceded by New office	Vice Chamberlain to Queen Charlotte; 1761–1766	Succeeded by Robert Brudenell
Preceded by The Duke of Ancaster and Kesteven	Master of the Horse to Queen Charlotte; 1766–1768	Succeeded by The Duke of Beaufort
Preceded by The Earl Harcourt	Lord Chamberlain to Queen Charlotte; 1768–1777	Succeeded by Marquess of Carmarthen
Military offices
Preceded by The Earl of Effingham	Captain and Colonel of the 1st Troop Horse Grenadier Guards; 1763–1766	Succeeded by The Lord Howard de Walden
Preceded by The Earl De La Warr	Captain and Colonel of His Majesty's Own Troop of Horse Guards; 1766–1777	Succeeded by The Marquess of Lothian
Peerage of Great Britain
Preceded by John West	Earl De La Warr; 1766–1777	Succeeded by William West
