= Thomas Sackville (1622–1693) =

English politician (1622–1693)

Member of the House of Commons of England
- In office 1689–1693
- Constituency: East Grinstead

Personal details
- Born: 1622 Sedlescombe, England
- Died: 3 January 1693 (aged 70–71) Sedlescombe, England

Thomas Sackville (1622–1693), of Sedlescombe, Sussex, was an English politician who served in the House of Commons in the 17th century, where he represented East Grinstead.

Sackville was baptised 30 June 1622, the second son of Sir Thomas Sackville (died 1639) and Elizabeth (née Boys) Sackville. He started at Christ Church, Oxford, in 1637. He married Margaret (née Compton) Roper, a widow, by 1662; the couple had no children. He died on 3 January 1693 and was buried in Sedlescombe.
