= John Sackville =

John Sackville may refer to:

- John Sackville (by 1523-47/52), MP for East Grinstead
- John Sackville (died 1557), English MP (1484–1557)
- John Sackville (died 1619), MP for East Grinstead
- John Sackville (died 1661), English MP for Rye
- Lord John Sackville (1713–1765), cricket patron and second son of the 1st Duke of Dorset, father of
- John Sackville, 3rd Duke of Dorset (1745–1799), cricket patron and ambassador to France
- John Sackville (actor), English actor

== See also ==
- John Sackville Labatt (1880–1952) president of the Labatt brewing company and a prominent kidnapping victim
