= Edward Sackville =

Edward Sackville may refer to:

- Edward Sackville, 4th Earl of Dorset (1591–1652), English courtier, soldier and politician
- Edward Sackville (1644–1678), Member of Parliament for East Grinstead 1675–8
- Edward Sackville (died 1714), MP for East Grinstead 1679 and governor of Tangier 1680-1

== See also ==
- Edward Sackville-West, 5th Baron Sackville (1901–1965), British music critic, novelist and member of the House of Lords
