= Edward Stanley, 15th Earl of Derby =

British politician (1826–1893)

The Right Honourable The Earl of Derby KG PC FRS
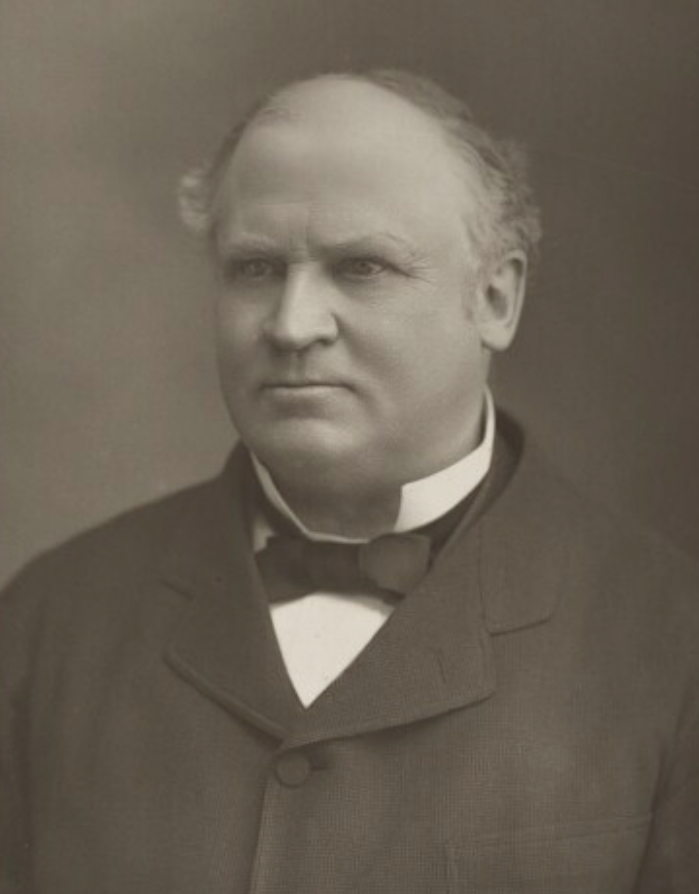
- The 15th Earl of Derby, c. 1891

Secretary of State for the Colonies
- In office 16 December 1882 – 9 June 1885
- Monarch: Victoria
- Prime Minister: William Ewart Gladstone
- Preceded by: The Earl of Kimberley
- Succeeded by: Frederick Stanley
- In office 26 February 1858 – 5 June 1858
- Monarch: Victoria
- Prime Minister: The Earl of Derby
- Preceded by: Henry Labouchere
- Succeeded by: Edward Bulwer-Lytton

Secretary of State for Foreign Affairs
- In office 21 February 1874 – 2 April 1878
- Monarch: Victoria
- Prime Minister: Benjamin Disraeli
- Preceded by: The Earl Granville
- Succeeded by: The Marquess of Salisbury
- In office 6 July 1866 – 9 December 1868
- Monarch: Victoria
- Prime Minister: The Earl of Derby; Benjamin Disraeli
- Preceded by: The Earl of Clarendon
- Succeeded by: The Earl of Clarendon

Secretary of State for India
- In office 2 August 1858 – 11 June 1859
- Preceded by: Office established (himself as the President of the Board of Control)
- Succeeded by: Sir Charles Wood

President of the Board of Control
- In office 5 June 1858 – 2 August 1858
- Preceded by: The Earl of Ellenborough
- Succeeded by: Office abolished (himself as the Secretary of State for India)

Parliamentary Under-Secretary of State for Foreign Affairs
- In office 18 May 1852 – 28 December 1852
- Monarch: Victoria
- Prime Minister: The Earl of Derby
- Preceded by: Austen Henry Layard
- Succeeded by: The Lord Wodehouse

Member of the House of Lords Lord Temporal
- In office 24 October 1869 – 21 April 1893; Hereditary Peerage
- Preceded by: The 14th Earl of Derby
- Succeeded by: The 16th Earl of Derby

Member of Parliament for King's Lynn
- In office 1848 – 1869; Serving with Robert Jocelyn, John Henry Gurney Sr. and Sir Fowell Buxton, 3rd Baronet
- Preceded by: Lord George Bentinck
- Succeeded by: Lord Claud Hamilton

Personal details
- Born: 21 July 1826
- Died: 21 April 1893 (aged 66)
- Party: Conservative (1848–1880); Liberal (1880–1886); Liberal Unionist (1886–1893)
- Spouse(s): Lady Mary Sackville-West (m. 1870; his death 1893)
- Parent(s): Edward Smith-Stanley, 14th Earl of Derby; Emma Caroline Bootle-Wilbraham
- Education: Trinity College, Cambridge

Edward Henry Stanley, 15th Earl of Derby (21 July 1826 – 21 April 1893; known as Lord Stanley from 1851 to 1869) was a British statesman. He served as Secretary of State for Foreign Affairs twice, from 1866 to 1868 and from 1874 to 1878, and also twice as Colonial Secretary in 1858 and from 1882 to 1885.

== Background and education ==
He was born to Edward Smith-Stanley, 14th Earl of Derby, who led the Conservative Party from 1846 to 1868 and served as Prime Minister three times, and Emma Caroline Bootle-Wilbraham, daughter of Edward Bootle-Wilbraham, 1st Baron Skelmersdale, and was the older brother of Frederick Arthur Stanley, 16th Earl of Derby, for whom the NHL's Stanley Cup is named. The Stanleys were one of the richest landowning families in England. Lord Stanley, as he was styled before acceding to the earldom, was educated at Eton, Rugby and Trinity College, Cambridge, where he took a first in classics and became a member of the society known as the Cambridge Apostles.

== Political career ==
In March 1848 he unsuccessfully contested the borough of Lancaster, and then made a long tour in the West Indies, Canada and the United States. During his absence, he was elected member for King's Lynn, which he represented till October 1869, when he succeeded to the peerage. He took his place, as a matter of course, among the Conservatives, and delivered his maiden speech in May 1850 on the sugar duties. Just before, he had made a very brief tour in Jamaica and South America. In 1852 he went to India, and while travelling in that country, he was appointed under-secretary for foreign affairs in his father's first administration. On 11 March 1853, he was commissioned as a captain in the 3rd Royal Lancashire Militia.

From the outset of his career, he was known to be more politically sympathetic to the Liberals rather than the Conservatives, and in 1855 Lord Palmerston offered him the post of Secretary of State for the Colonies. He was much tempted by the proposal, and hurried down to Knowsley to consult his father, who called out when he entered the room, "Halo, Stanley! what brings you here?—Has Dizzy cut his throat, or are you going to be married?" When the object of his sudden appearance had been explained, the Conservative chief received the courteous suggestion of the prime minister with anything but favour, and the offer was declined. On 13 May 1856, he was appointed to the Royal Commission on the purchase of commissions in the British army. In his father's second administration Lord Stanley held, at first, the office of Secretary of State for the Colonies (1858), but became President of the Board of Control on the resignation of Lord Ellenborough. He had the charge of the India Bill of 1858 in the House of Commons, became the first Secretary of State for India, and left behind him in the India Office an excellent reputation as a man of business.

After the revolution in Greece and the flight of King Otto, Queen Victoria's second son, Prince Alfred, was the Greek people's choice as their next king. After he declined, the idea arose of electing a great and wealthy English nobleman, in the open hope that although they might have to offer him a Civil List, he would decline to receive it. Lord Stanley was the favourite candidate. However, despite reports to the contrary, he was, in fact, never formally offered the crown.

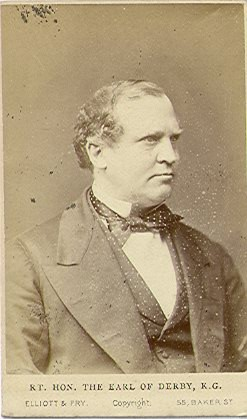
The Earl of Derby.

=== Foreign minister 1866-68 ===
After the fall of the Russell government in 1866 he became Secretary of State for Foreign Affairs in his father's third administration. He compared his conduct in that great post to that of a man floating down a river and fending off from his vessel, as well as he could, the various obstacles it encountered. He enunciated the policy of Splendid isolation in 1866:

it is the duty of the Government of this country, placed as it is with regard to geographical position, to keep itself upon terms of goodwill with all surrounding nations, but not to entangle itself with any single or monopolizing alliance with any one of them; above all to endeavour not to interfere needlessly and vexatiously with the internal affairs of any foreign country."

Passport for a railway engineer dated 1876 containing Lord Stanley's full title and his signature.

He arranged the collective guarantee of the neutrality of Luxembourg in 1867, likely to be a theatre of war with the conflict between France and Prussia growing ever more likely. He also negotiated a convention with the USA about the CSS Alabama, which, however, was not ratified, and refused to take any part in the troubles in Crete.

=== Foreign Minister 1874-78 ===
In 1874 he again became Foreign Secretary in Disraeli's government. In 1875 came the purchase of the controlling shares in the Suez Canal Company. By negotiations, Russia gave up substantial gains in the Balkans and a foothold in the Mediterranean. Britain gained control of Cyprus from the Ottomans as a naval base covering the Eastern Mediterranean. In exchange, Britain guaranteed the Asiatic territories of the Ottoman Empire. Britain did not do well in conflicts in Afghanistan and South Africa.

Derby acquiesced in Disraeli's purchase of the Suez Canal shares, a measure then considered dangerous by many people, but ultimately most successful. He accepted the Andrassy Note, but declined to accede to the Berlin Memorandum. Derby's conduct during the Eastern Crisis was mysterious to many of his contemporaries and for some time thereafter. Derby's hope for peace with Russia led him (and his wife) to share Cabinet secrets with the Russian ambassador, Pyotr Shuvalov, in hopes of averting war with Russia. Robert Blake commented that "Derby surely must be the only Foreign Secretary in British history to reveal the innermost secrets of the Cabinet to the ambassador of a foreign power in order to frustrate the presumed intentions of his own Prime Minister." Derby resigned in January 1878 when the Cabinet resolved to send the British fleet through the Dardanelles, but when that action soon proved unnecessary, Derby was allowed to withdraw his resignation. However, he resigned again and finally in the same year when the Cabinet agreed to call up the reserve.

By October 1879, it was clear enough that he had thrown in his lot with the Liberal Party, but it was not till March 1880 that he publicly announced this change of allegiance. He did not at first take office in the second Gladstone government, but became Colonial Secretary in December 1882, holding this position till the fall of that government in the summer of 1885. In 1886 the Liberal party split; Lord Derby became a Liberal Unionist, and took an active part in the general management of that party, leading it in the House of Lords till 1891, when Lord Hartington became Duke of Devonshire. In 1892 he presided over the Labour Commission.

He succeeded his father as Honorary Colonel of the 1st Lancashire Rifle Volunteer Corps (1st Volunteer Battalion, King's (Liverpool Regiment) from 1888), being appointed on 21 September 1870. After his death he was succeeded by his son in turn.

He served as President of the first day of the 1881 Co-operative Congress.

== Personal life ==
Lord Derby married Lady Mary, daughter of George Sackville-West, 5th Earl De La Warr and widow of James Gascoyne-Cecil, 2nd Marquess of Salisbury, in 1870. They had no children. Derby's health never recovered from an attack of influenza which he had in 1891, and he died at Knowsley on 21 April 1893, aged 66. He was succeeded in the earldom by his younger brother, Frederick. Lady Derby died in December 1900.

== Arms ==
Coat of arms of Edward Stanley, 15th Earl of Derby
Crest On a chapeau gules turned up ermine an eagle, wings extended, or, preying on an infant in its cradle proper, swaddled gules, the cradle laced or. Escutcheon Argent, on a bend azure three stags' heads caboshed or. Supporters Dexter, a griffin, wings elevated; sinister, a stag, each or, and ducally collared with line reflexed over the back azure. Motto Sans changer (Without changing). Orders The Most Noble Order of the Garter (KG).

== Notes ==
Parliament of the United Kingdom
Preceded by Lord George Bentinck; Viscount Jocelyn	Member of Parliament for King's Lynn; 1848–1869; With: Viscount Jocelyn 1848–1854; John Henry Gurney 1854–1865; Sir Thomas Fowell Buxton, Bt 1865–1868; Robert Bourke 1868–1869	Succeeded by Lord Claud Hamilton; Robert Bourke
Political offices
Preceded by Austen Henry Layard	Under-Secretary of State for Foreign Affairs; 1852	Succeeded by The Lord Wodehouse
Preceded by Henry Labouchere	Secretary of State for the Colonies; 1858–1859	Succeeded by Sir Edward Bulwer-Lytton, Bt
Preceded by The Earl of Ellenborough	President of the Board of Control; 1858	Succeeded by Himself as Secretary of State for India
Preceded by Himself as President of the Board of Control	Secretary of State for India; 1858–1859	Succeeded by Sir Charles Wood, Bt
Preceded by The Earl of Clarendon	Secretary of State for Foreign Affairs; 1866–1868	Succeeded by The Earl of Clarendon
Preceded by The Earl Granville	Secretary of State for Foreign Affairs; 1874–1878	Succeeded by The Marquess of Salisbury
Preceded by The Earl of Kimberley	Secretary of State for the Colonies; 1882–1885	Succeeded by Frederick Stanley
Academic offices
Preceded by The Lord Glencorse	Rector of the University of Glasgow; 1868–1871	Succeeded by Benjamin Disraeli
Preceded by Sir William Stirling-Maxwell, Bt	Rector of the University of Edinburgh; 1874–1877	Succeeded by Marquess of Hartington
Preceded by The Earl Granville	Chancellor of the University of London; 1891–1893	Succeeded by The Lord Herschell
Peerage of England
Preceded by Edward Smith-Stanley	Earl of Derby; 1869–1893	Succeeded by Frederick Arthur Stanley
