= Manor Ground (Bexhill-on-Sea) =

Cricket ground at Bexhill-on-Sea, Sussex, England

Ground information
- Location: Bexhill-on-Sea, Sussex
- Coordinates: 50.8427°N 0.4842°E
- Establishment: 1894 (first recorded match)

Team information
Earl de la Warr's XI	(1894)
- As of 27 August 2010; Source: Ground profile

Manor Ground was a cricket ground at Bexhill-on-Sea, Sussex, England. The first recorded match on the ground was in 1894, when Viscount Cantelupe's XI played the touring South Africans in a non first-class match. The only first-class match held at the ground came in 1896 when Earl de la Warr's XI played the touring Australians. In 1965 when Sussex played the International Cavaliers. The ground is today a part of the sports field of St Richard's Catholic College.
