= Charles Sackville-West, 6th Earl De La Warr =

British politician and military officer (1815–1873)

Major-General The Right Honourable The Earl De La Warr KCB
- Born: 13 November 1815
- Died: 23 April 1873 (aged 57); River Cam
- Education: Harrow School
- Military career
- Allegiance: United Kingdom
- Branch: British Army
- Rank: Major-General
- Unit: 21st Regiment of Foot
- Conflicts: First Anglo-Sikh War; Battle of Sobraon; Crimean War; Siege of Sevastopol; Battle of Inkerman; Battle of the Great Redan
- Awards: Legion of Honour (France); Order of the Medjidie (Ottoman)

Major-General Charles Richard Sackville-West, 6th Earl De La Warr, KCB (13 November 1815 – 23 April 1873) was a British Army officer. He was a peer for the last 4 1/6 years of his life, succeeding his father in 1869. De La Warr committed suicide by drowning himself in the River Cam four year later; unmarried, his title and estates were inherited by his brother.

== Early life ==
Sackville-West was the second son of George Sackville-West, 5th Earl De La Warr, and Lady Elizabeth Sackville, daughter of John Sackville, 3rd Duke of Dorset. He was notably brother of:

- George West, Viscount Cantelupe (whom he outlived)
- Reginald Sackville, 7th Earl De La Warr (who outlived and inherited the key estates)
- Elizabeth Russell, Duchess of Bedford
- Mortimer Sackville-West, 1st Baron Sackville, and
- Lionel Sackville-West, 2nd Baron Sackville.

He was educated at Harrow.

== Career ==
Sackville-West served in the British Army and was appointed aide-de-camp and military secretary to Sir Hugh Gough in India in 1845. He fought at the Battle of Sobraon in 1846 during the First Anglo-Sikh War. In 1850 he became known by the courtesy title Lord West after the untimely death of his elder brother, Lord Cantelupe who was likewise unmarried.

Promoted to major in 1852 and to lieutenant-colonel in 1855, he served in the Crimean War. He was appointed a Companion of the Order of the Bath in 1855 and an Officer of the Legion of Honour in 1856 and awarded the Order of the Medjidie in 1858. In 1864 he was promoted to major-general. He succeeded his father in the earldom in 1869.

In 1871 he was made a Knight Commander of the Order of the Bath (KCB).

== Death ==
Lord Delaware (Note: A longstanding variant spelling used for instance in his death records) died in April 1873, aged 57, by drowning himself in the river Cam. (Note: Theresa wife of Frederick Richard West, grandson of the 2nd Earl De La Warr (thus Frederick was (first) cousin to the subject's father), erected a memorial to the 6th Earl De La Warr (1815-1873); his death was otherwise not memorialized as he killed himself. The adjacent source says speculation remains on the relationship between the unmarried earl and this lady.)

The reason for his suicide was revealed in one of the letters he sent to his agent. He blamed himself for the death of his mistress Annie Nethercote (b.1840), to whom he had been very attached. Nethercote had died the previous year from an inflammation of the stomach and syncope as a result of her alcoholism. Delaware was very distressed by her death.

Unmarried, he was succeeded in the earldom by his brother, Reginald, Lord Buckhurst.

== References and footnotes ==
Citations

Footnotes

Peerage of Great Britain
Preceded by George John Sackville-West	Earl De La Warr; 1869–1873	Succeeded by Reginald Windsor Sackville
