= Lionel Sackville-West, 2nd Baron Sackville =

English diplomat (1827–1908)

The Right Honourable The Lord Sackville GCMG
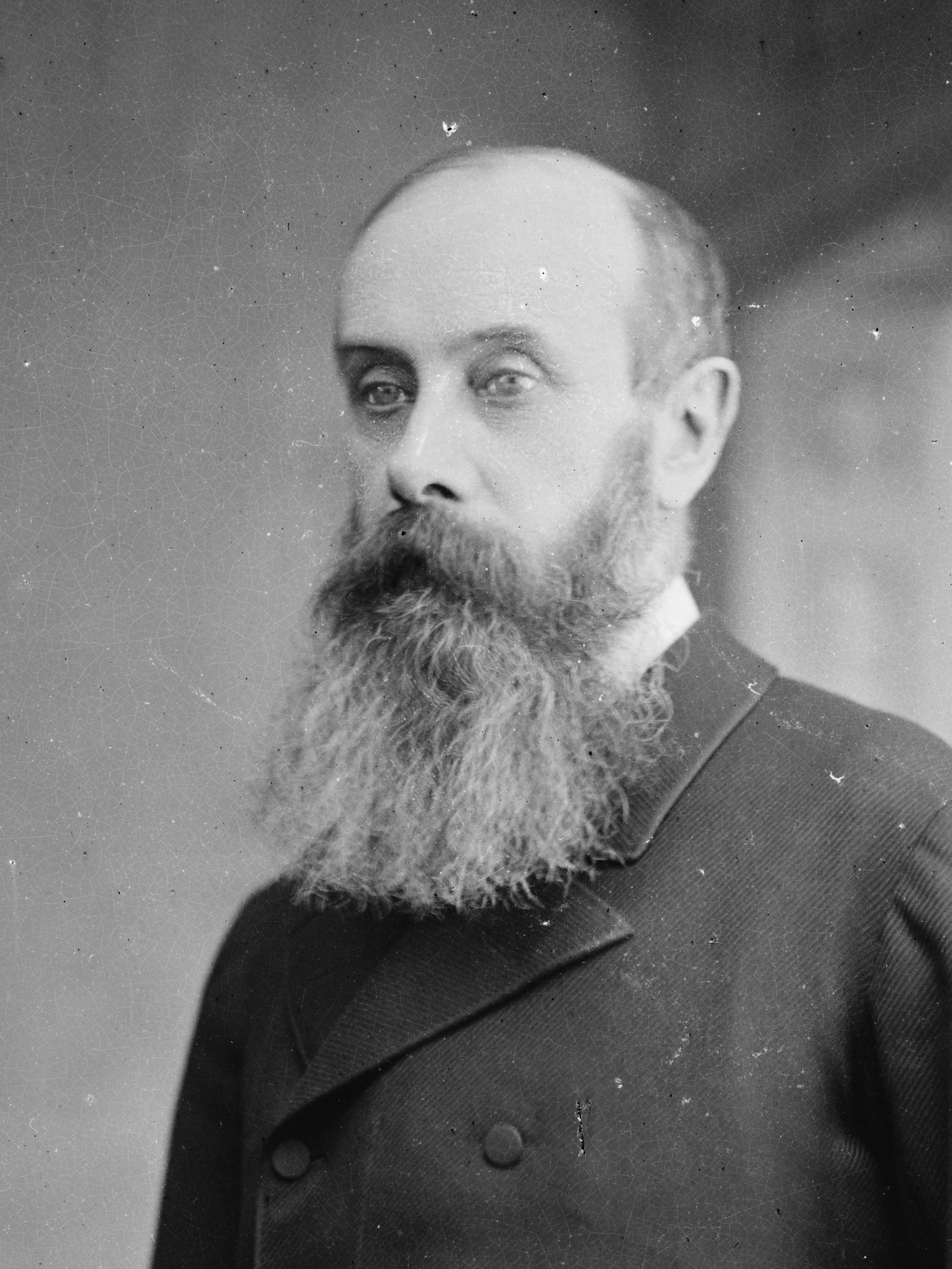
- Sackville-West, 1870–1880

Envoy Extraordinary and Minister Plenipotentiary to the United States
- In office 1881–1888
- Monarch: Queen Victoria
- Preceded by: Sir Edward Thornton
- Succeeded by: Sir Julian Pauncefote

Personal details
- Born: 19 July 1827 Cambridgeshire, England
- Died: 3 September 1908 (aged 81)
- Domestic partner: Pepita
- Children: Victoria
- Parents: George Sackville-West, 5th Earl De La Warr (father); Lady Elizabeth Sackville (mother)

Lionel Sackville-West, 2nd Baron Sackville, GCMG (19 July 1827 – 3 September 1908), was a British diplomat.

== Background ==
Sackville-West was the fourth son of George Sackville-West, 5th Earl De La Warr, by Lady Elizabeth, daughter of John Sackville, 3rd Duke of Dorset. He was the younger brother of George West, Viscount Cantelupe, Charles Sackville-West, 6th Earl De La Warr and Mortimer Sackville-West, 1st Baron Sackville.

== Diplomatic career ==
Sackville-West was Minister Plenipotentiary to Argentina from 1872 to 1878 and Ambassador to Spain from 1878 to 1881. Then, he was appointed Envoy Extraordinary and Minister Plenipotentiary to the United States, a post he held until 1888, when he was declared persona non grata for writing of the Murchison letter. In 1888, he also succeeded his elder brother Mortimer in the barony of Sackville.

== Family ==
Lord Sackville had seven children by a Spanish dancer, Josefa de la Oliva (née Durán y Ortega, known as Pepita). Soon after his death one of these, calling himself Ernest Henri Jean Baptiste Sackville-West, claimed to be a lawful son and his father's heir. He asserted that between 1863 and 1867 Sackville-West had married his mother. The case came before the English courts of law in 1909–1910, and it was decided that the children of this union were all illegitimate, as Pepita's husband, Juan Antonio Gabriel de Oliva, was alive during the whole period of his wife's connection with Sackville-West. Lord Sackville died in September 1908, aged 81, and was succeeded by his nephew, Lionel, who married his cousin, Lord Sackville's daughter Victoria. They were the parents of Vita Sackville-West.

== Sources ==
- Lee, Sidney, ed. (1912). "Sackville-West, Lionel Sackville" . Dictionary of National Biography (2nd supplement). London: Smith, Elder & Co.
- Matthew, H. C. G.; Sanderson, T. H. "West, Lionel Sackville Sackville-, second Baron Sackville (1827–1908)". Oxford Dictionary of National Biography (online ed.). Oxford University Press. doi:10.1093/ref:odnb/35902. (Subscription, Wikipedia Library access or UK public library membership required.)
- Campbell, Charles S. "The Dismissal of Lord Sackville." Mississippi Valley Historical Review 44.4 (1958): 635-648 online.
- Brooks, George. "Anglophobia in the United States: Some Light on the Presidential Election." Westminster Review 130.1 (1888): 736-756 online.

Diplomatic posts
Preceded by Hon. William Stuart	Minister Plenipotentiary to Argentina; 1872–1878	Succeeded by Clare Ford
Preceded by Austen Henry Layard	Ambassador to Spain; 1878–1881	Succeeded by Sir Robert Morier
Preceded by Edward Thornton	Envoy Extraordinary and Minister Plenipotentiary to the United States; 1881–1888	Succeeded by Sir Julian Pauncefote
Peerage of the United Kingdom
Preceded by Mortimer Sackville-West	Baron Sackville; 1888–1908	Succeeded by Lionel Sackville-West
