= Elizabeth Sackville-West, Countess De La Warr =

British peeress (1795–1870)

The Right Honourable The Countess De La Warr
- Countess of De La Warr; Baroness Buckhurst
- Born: Lady Elizabeth Sackville; 11 August 1795; Knole, Kingdom of Great Britain
- Died: 9 January 1870 (aged 74); United Kingdom of Great Britain and Ireland
- Buried: January 1870; St Michael and All Angels, Withyham
- Spouse: George Sackville-West, 5th Earl De La Warr (m. 1813; died 1869)
- Issue: George West, Viscount Cantelupe; Charles Sackville-West, 6th Earl De La Warr; Reginald Sackville, 7th Earl De La Warr; Elizabeth Russell, Duchess of Bedford; Mortimer Sackville-West, 1st Baron Sackville; Mary Stanley, Countess of Derby; Lionel Sackville-West, 2nd Baron Sackville; William Sackville; Arabella Bannerman, Lady Bannerman
- Father: John Sackville, 3rd Duke of Dorset
- Mother: Arabella Cope, Duchess of Dorset

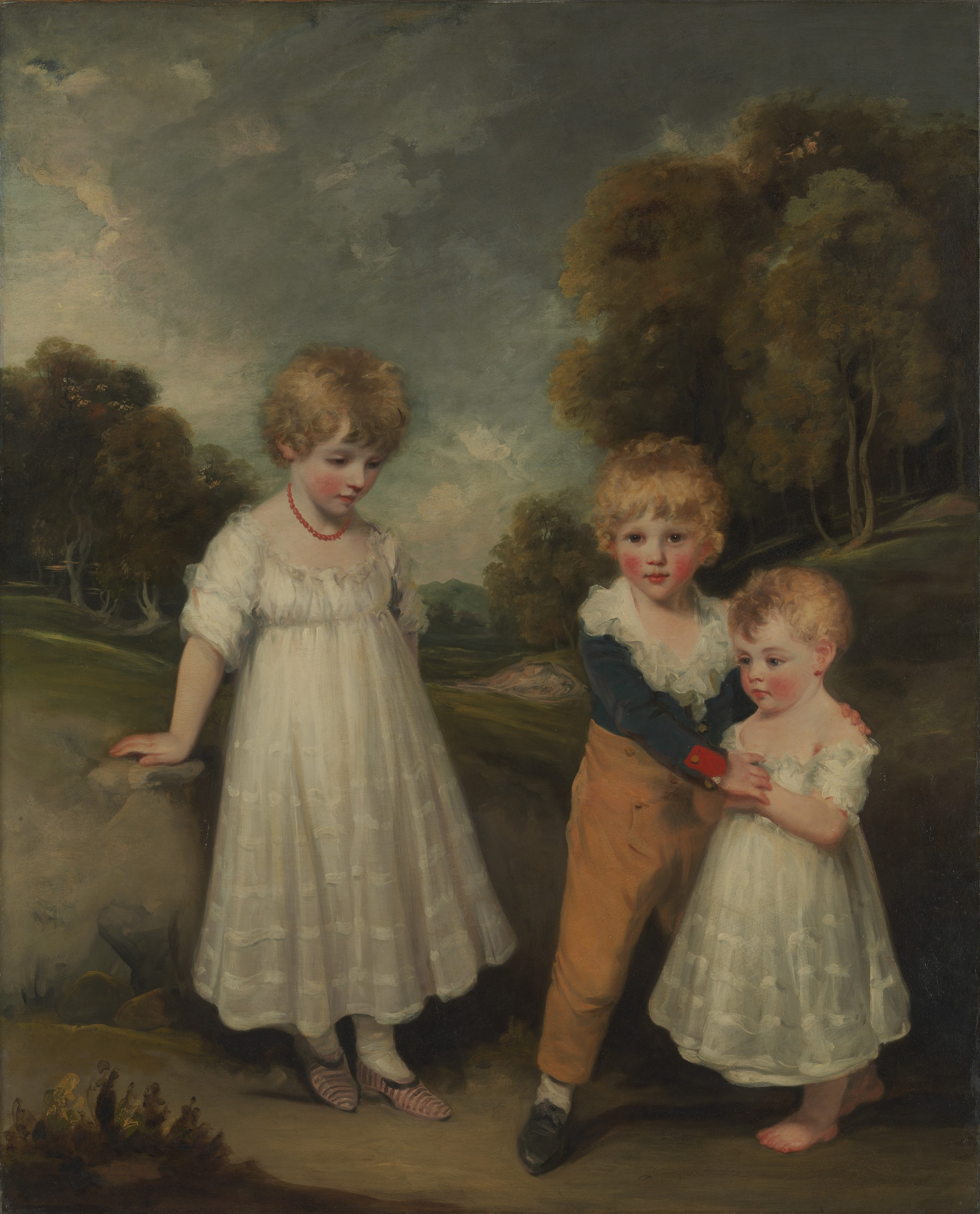
Portrait of Lady Mary Sackville (1792–1864), later Countess Amherst and of Plymouth; George Sackville, Earl of Middlesex (1793–1815), later Duke of Dorset and Lady Elizabeth Sackville (1795–1870), later Countess De La Warr and Baroness Buckhurst.

Elizabeth Sackville-West, Countess De La Warr and 1st Baroness Buckhurst (11 August 1795 – 9 January 1870), was a British peeress.

== Early life ==
The Countess De La Warr was born Lady Elizabeth Sackville on 11 August 1795. She was the youngest daughter of John Sackville, 3rd Duke of Dorset, and his wife, the former Arabella Diana Cope. Her only brother George became the 4th Duke of Dorset and her sister, Lady Mary Sackville, married twice, first to Other Windsor, 6th Earl of Plymouth and secondly to William Amherst, 1st Earl Amherst. When her sister died she inherited her estate at Knole.

Her father served as a Member of Parliament for Kent, a Privy Councillor and British Ambassador to France in Paris from 1783 to 1789 before serving as Lord Steward of the Household from 1789 to 1799. Her paternal grandparents were Lord John Philip Sackville (second son of 1st Duke of Dorset) and the former Lady Frances Leveson-Gower. Her mother was the eldest daughter and coheiress of Sir Charles Cope, 2nd Baronet and Catherine Bisshopp (the sister of Cecil Bisshopp, 12th Baron Zouche).

== Personal life ==
On 21 June 1813 she married George Sackville-West, 5th Earl De La Warr, the only son of John West, 4th Earl De La Warr, the former Catherine Lyell. Lord De La Warr served as Lord Chamberlain of the Household under Sir Robert Peel between 1841 and 1846 and under Lord Derby between 1858 and 1859, and was sworn of the Privy Council in 1841. Together, they had ten children, nine of whom lived to maturity, including:

- George West, Viscount Cantelupe (1814–1850), who died unmarried.
- Charles Sackville-West, 6th Earl De La Warr (1815–1873)
- Reginald Sackville, 7th Earl De La Warr (1817–1896)
- Elizabeth Sackville-West, Duchess of Bedford (1818–1897), who married Francis Russell, 9th Duke of Bedford and had issue.
- Mortimer Sackville-West, 1st Baron Sackville (1820–1888)
- [a son] (1822–1823)
- Lady Mary Catherine (1824–1900), who married first, James Gascoyne-Cecil, 2nd Marquess of Salisbury and had issue, and secondly to Edward Stanley, 15th Earl of Derby.
- Lionel Sackville-West, 2nd Baron Sackville (1827–1908)
- William Sackville (1830–1905)
- Lady Arabella Diana (1835–1869), who married Sir Alexander Bannerman, 9th Baronet.

Lady De La Warr died on 9 January 1870. She was buried at St Michael and All Angels Churchyard in Withyham, East Sussex.

=== Peerage ===
On 27 April 1864, Lady De La Warr was created Baroness Buckhurst, of Buckhurst in the County of Sussex, by Queen Victoria with a special remainder to her second surviving son, Reginald and the heirs male of his body. Failing him, to her third and fourth son and their heirs male with a remainder that if any of the heirs inherited the barony and the earldom of De La Warr, then the barony should pass to a younger brother or younger son of the heirs male. The patent was worded to prevent the barony and earldom being held by the same person. However, when Reginald inherited the barony in 1870 and subsequently the earldom in 1873, his brother, Mortimer, tried to make a claim to the barony, but the House of Lords deemed the remainders invalid. Mortimer was instead created Baron Sackville as a consolation. (Note: "This complicated creation was not totally unique as three years previously in 1861 the Earldom of Cromartie was granted to Anne, Duchess of Sutherland, with a similar remainder. They are often referred to as "the two jumping peerages" as the intention of the draughtsman appears to have been to create a peerage that would "jump" from one person in his lifetime to another as certain circumstances arose. The descent of the Earldom of Cromartie has never been tested and that of the Barony of Buckhurst was frustrated within one generation. The Hon Reginald Sackville-West took his seat in the House of Lords as Baron Buckhurst following the death of his mother in 1870. Three years later he succeeded his elder brother as 7th Earl De La Warr and yet made no move to surrender the Barony of Buckhurst in accordance with the letters patent. The Barony of Buckhurst was claimed, together Knole Park and the other Sackville estates, by his younger brother, Hon Mortimer Sackville-West. His claim to the estates was successful but not his claim to the Barony of Buckhurst. As a consolation he was created Baron Sackville in 1876, with a special remainder, failing the heirs male of his body, to his two younger brothers in like manner, they being the only two people who might have inherited the Barony of Buckhurst had the letters patent of 1864 being adhered to.")

Peerage of the United Kingdom
New creation	Baroness Buckhurst; 1864–1870	Succeeded by Reginald Sackville-West
