= George Sackville-West, 5th Earl De La Warr =

British courtier and Tory politician

The Right Honourable The Earl De La Warr PC
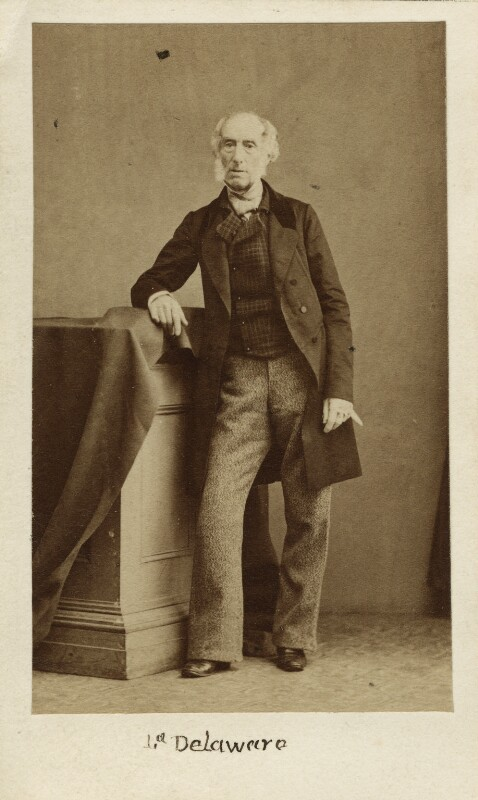

Lord Chamberlain
- In office 1841–1846
- Monarch: Victoria
- Prime Minister: Sir Robert Peel, Bt
- Preceded by: The Earl of Uxbridge
- Succeeded by: The Earl Spencer
- In office 1858–1859
- Monarch: Victoria
- Prime Minister: The Earl of Derby
- Preceded by: The Marquess of Breadalbane
- Succeeded by: The Viscount Sydney

Personal details
- Born: George John Sackville-West; 26 October 1791
- Died: 23 February 1869 (aged 77)
- Party: Conservative
- Spouse: Lady Elizabeth Sackville (after 1813)
- Children: 10 (see below)
- Parent(s): John West, 4th Earl De La Warr; Catherina Lyell
- Education: Brasenose College, Oxford

George John Sackville-West, 5th Earl de la Warr, PC (26 October 1791 – 23 February 1869), styled Viscount Cantelupe until 1795, was a British courtier and Tory politician.

== Background ==
Sackville-West was the son of John West, 4th Earl De La Warr and Catherina Lyell, daughter of Henry Lyell, a naturalized British subject (born Henrik Leijel of the Swedish noble family Leijel, nr. 1531). He succeeded his father in the earldom in 1795 at the age of three.

== Political career ==
Lord De La Warr served as Lord Chamberlain of the Household under Sir Robert Peel between 1841 and 1846 and under Lord Derby between 1858 and 1859. He was sworn of the Privy Council in 1841.

== Family ==
Lord De La Warr married Lady Elizabeth Sackville, daughter of John Sackville, 3rd Duke of Dorset and Arabella Diana Cope, on 21 June 1813. They had ten children, nine of whom lived into maturity:

- George West, Viscount Cantelupe (1814–1850), Member of Parliament for Helston and Lewes, died unmarried.
- Charles Sackville-West, 6th Earl De La Warr (1815–1873).
- Reginald Sackville, 7th Earl De La Warr (1817–1896).
- Lady Elizabeth Sackville-West (1818–1897), married Francis Russell, 9th Duke of Bedford and had issue.
- Mortimer Sackville-West, 1st Baron Sackville (1820–1888).
- [a son] (1822–1823)
- Lady Mary Catherine (1824–1900), married firstly, James Gascoyne-Cecil, 2nd Marquess of Salisbury and had issue. She married secondly, Edward Stanley, 15th Earl of Derby.
- Lionel Sackville-West, 2nd Baron Sackville (1827–1908).
- William Sackville-West (1830–1905), married Georgina Dodwell and had issue, including Lionel Sackville-West, 3rd Baron Sackville.
- Lady Arabella Diana Sackville-West (1835–1869), married Sir Alexander Bannerman, 9th Baronet.

Political offices
Preceded by The Earl of Uxbridge	Lord Chamberlain; 1841–1846	Succeeded by The Earl Spencer
Preceded by The Marquess of Breadalbane	Lord Chamberlain; 1858–1859	Succeeded by The Viscount Sydney
Peerage of Great Britain
Preceded by John Richard West	Earl De La Warr; 1795–1869	Succeeded by Charles Richard Sackville-West
