= Elizabeth Russell, Duchess of Bedford =

Her Grace The Duchess of Bedford VA
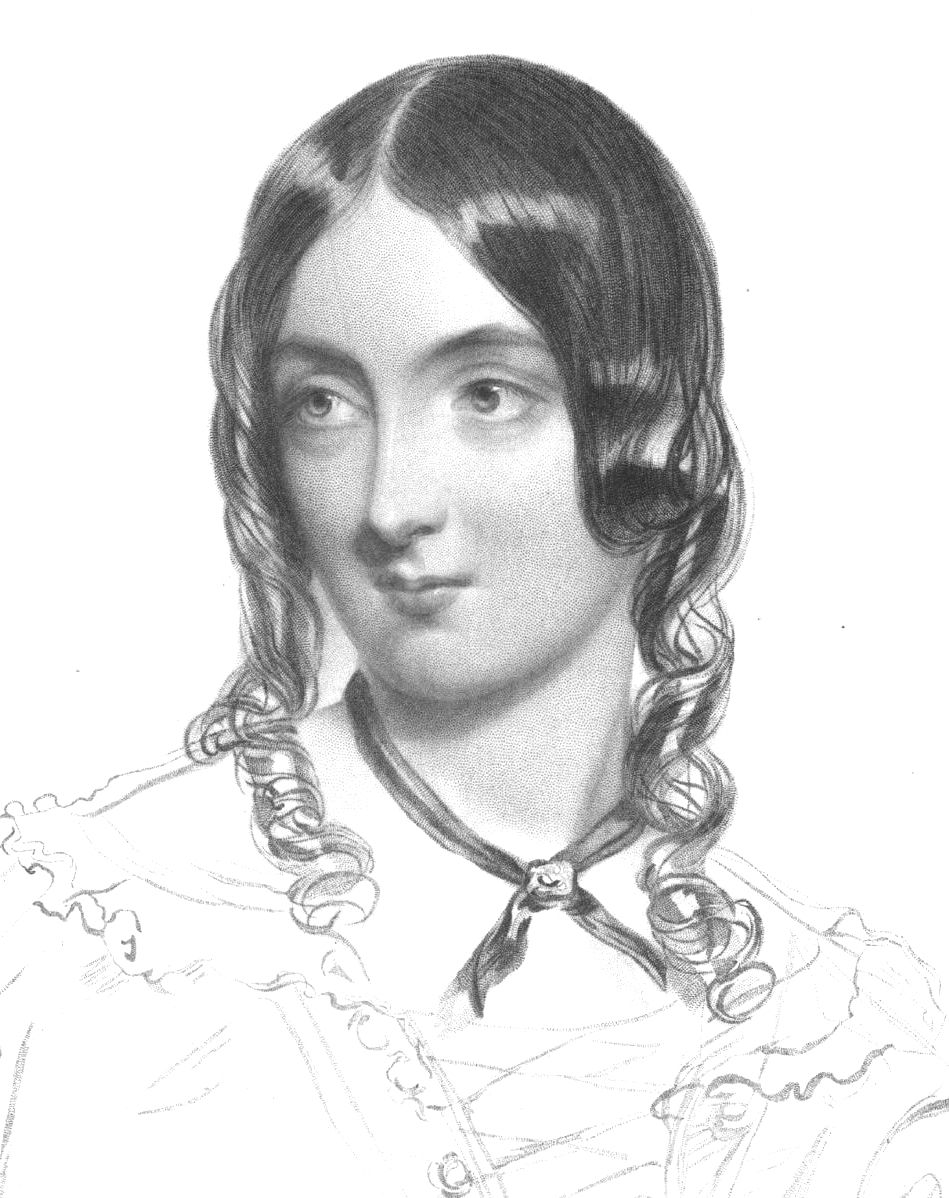
- Lady Elizabeth Russell (nee Sackville-West), Duchess of Bedford
- Born: Lady Elizabeth Sackville-West; 23 September 1818; Bourn Hall, Cambridgeshire, England
- Died: 22 April 1897 (aged 78); Latimer House, Buckinghamshire, England
- Buried: St Michael's Church, Chenies, Buckinghamshire
- Spouse: Francis Russell, 9th Duke of Bedford (m. 1844; died 1891)
- Issue: George Russell, 10th Duke of Bedford; Lady Ella Russell; Lady Ermyntrude Malet; Herbrand Russell, 11th Duke of Bedford
- Parents: George Sackville-West, 5th Earl De La Warr; Lady Elizabeth Sackville
- Occupation: Mistress of the Robes to Queen Victoria

Elizabeth Russell, Duchess of Bedford VA (née Sackville-West; 23 September 1818 – 22 April 1897) was the daughter of the 5th Earl De La Warr and his wife Lady Elizabeth Sackville.

== Early life ==
She was baptised as Elizabeth West on 18 October 1818 at Bourn, Cambridgeshire, the abode was given as the family home at Bourn Hall.

== Marriage and issue ==
Lady Elizabeth Sackville-West was a bridesmaid at the wedding of Queen Victoria and Prince Albert on 10 February 1840.

In Buckhurst Park on 18 January 1844 she was married to Francis Russell, a grandson of the late 6th Duke of Bedford and nephew of Lord John Russell, the Whig politician and future Prime Minister. Francis Russell succeeded his cousin as 9th Duke of Bedford in 1872.

Elizabeth was appointed Mistress of the Robes to the Queen by Mr Gladstone in 1880, and served in that capacity until 1883. In 1886, Gladstone's policy of Home Rule had alienated many of the aristocrats in the Liberal Party, and no lady of suitable (i.e., ducal) rank could be found who was willing to serve as Mistress of the Robes. The Duchess of Bedford performed the duties of the office for the duration of the ministry, but was not appointed to the post by Gladstone.

She was widowed in 1891 after the Duke committed suicide. She died, aged 78, at Latimer House, near Chesham, Buckinghamshire, in 1897 and, after cremation at Woking Crematorium, her ashes were buried in the 'Bedford Chapel' at St. Michael's Church, Chenies, Buckinghamshire.

Court offices
| Preceded by The Duchess of Wellington | Mistress of the Robes to Queen Victoria; 1880–1883 | Succeeded by The Duchess of Roxburghe |
| Preceded by The Duchess of Buccleuch and Queensberry | Mistress of the Robes to Queen Victoria; 1886 (pro tempore) | Succeeded by The Duchess of Buccleuch and Queensberry |
