= Mortimer Sackville-West, 1st Baron Sackville =

British peer and court official

The Lord Sackville
- Baron Sackville
- Coat of arms of Baron Sackville
- Tenure: 2 October 1876 – 1 October 1888
- Successor: Lionel Sackville-West, 2nd Baron
- Born: Mortimer Sackville-West; 22 September 1820
- Died: 1 October 1888 (aged 68)
- Spouse(s): Fanny Charlotte Dickson; Elizabeth Faber
- Parents: George John West, 5th Earl De La Warr; Elizabeth Sackville, Baroness Buckhurst

Mortimer Sackville-West, 1st Baron Sackville (22 September 1820 – 1 October 1888), was a British peer and court official.

Sackville-West was the fourth son of George Sackville-West, 5th Earl De La Warr, and Elizabeth Sackville, 1st Baroness Buckhurst, younger daughter and co-heir of John Sackville, 3rd Duke of Dorset. On the death of his kinsman Charles Sackville-Germain, 5th Duke of Dorset, in 1843, the dukedom and its subsidiary titles became extinct. Large parts of the Sackville estates passed to the West family through Elizabeth. The Sackville-Wests inherited parts of the estates by arrangement, notably the estate of Knole Park in Kent.

During his career Sackville-West held several high appointments within the Royal household. In 1876 he was raised to the peerage as Baron Sackville, of Knole in the County of Kent. The peerage was created with special remainder, failing heirs male of his body, to his younger brothers Lionel and William Edward. He died in 1888, aged 68, and was succeeded in the barony according to the special remainder by his younger brother Lionel.

Peerage of the United Kingdom
New creation	Baron Sackville; 1876–1888	Succeeded by Lionel Sackville-West
