= Walterus le Fust =

Walterus le Fust (fl. 1307), was an English Member of Parliament (MP).

He was a Member of the Parliament of England for Lewes in 1307.

Parliament of England
Preceded by Galfridus de Wolvehope; Walterus Nyng	Member of Parliament for Lewes; 1307; With: Robertus le Bynt	Succeeded by Simon Tring; Johannes Arnald
