= George Goring =

George Goring may refer to:

- George Goring (died 1594), MP for Lewes 1559 and 1563
- George Goring (died 1602), MP for Lewes 1593 and 1601
- George Goring, 1st Earl of Norwich (1585–1663), Royalist soldier
- George Goring, Lord Goring (1608–1657), Royalist soldier & eldest son of the above
- George Goring, Lord Goring, a character in Anthony Powell's 1952 novel A Buyer's Market
