= William Peterson =

William Peterson may refer to:

== Academics ==
- William H. Peterson (1921–2012), economist, writer, and speaker following the ideas of Ludwig von Mises
- William Peterson (academic) (1856–1921), Scottish academic and Principal of McGill University, Canada
- William Peterson (priest), dean of Carlisle, and of Exeter
- W. Wesley Peterson (1924–2009), American mathematician and computer scientist

== Politicians ==
- William Peterson (MP) (died 1578), member of parliament (MP) for Lewes
- William E. Peterson (born 1936), Republican member of the Illinois Senate
- William H. Peterson (politician), member of the 1865–1867 California State Assembly

== Sports ==
- Bill Peterson (1920–1993), American football coach
- Bill Peterson (linebacker) (born 1945), American football player
- Bill Peterson (basketball) (born 1957), director of basketball operations at Baylor University
- William James (American football) (William James Peterson, Jr., born 1979), American football cornerback
- William Peterson (footballer), British footballer in the early 20th-century

== See also ==
- William Petersen (born 1953), American actor
- William Petersen (demographer) (1912–2004), American sociologist and demographer
- William Petersson (1895–1965), Swedish athlete
- William Pedersen (disambiguation)
- William G. Pietersen (born 1937), businessman and author
- Billy Peterson, American bass player and songwriter
