= Bynt =

Bynt or Bint is a surname. Notable people with the surname include:

- Robert Bynt (died before 1431), English lawmaker
- Robertus le Bynt, 14th century English lawmaker

== See also ==
- Bint, Iran
- Patronymic#Arabic bint
