= Lord Goring =

Lord Goring may refer to:

- George Goring, 1st Earl of Norwich (1585–1663), prominent Royalist in the English Civil War
- George Goring, Lord Goring (1608–1657), eldest son of the above
- Charles Goring, 2nd Earl of Norwich (1615–1671), second son of the first Earl of Norwich
- Sir Harry Goring, 4th Baronet, third cousin twice removed of the last Goring Earl of Norwich, created Viscount Goring and Baron Bullinghel in the Jacobite Peerage

== Fictional characters ==
- Arthur, Viscount Goring, a fictional character in Oscar Wilde's 1895 play An Ideal Husband
- George Goring, Lord Goring, fictional character in Anthony Powell's 1952 novel A Buyer's Market, second in the A Dance to the Music of Time cycle
