= Tufton Beamish =

Tufton Beamish may refer to:

- Tufton Percy Hamilton Beamish (1874–1951), Rear Admiral in the Royal Navy and member of Parliament for Lewes (1924–1932 and 1936–1945)
- Tufton Beamish, Baron Chelwood of Lewes (1917–1989) son of the above; British Army officer and member of Parliament for Lewes (1945–1974)
