= Ricardus le Palmere =

Member of the Parliament of England

Ricardus de Palmere (fl. 1295–1302) was an English Member of Parliament (MP).

He was a Member of the Parliament of England for Lewes in 1295 and 1302.

Parliament of England
Preceded by ? ?	Member of Parliament for Lewes; 1295; With: Gervasius de Wolvehope	Succeeded by No return No return
Preceded by Reginaldus de Combe; Rogerus Coppyng	Member of Parliament for Lewes; 1302; With: Gervasius de Wolvehope	Succeeded by Galfridus de Wolvehope; Walterus Nyng
