= John Gosselyn =

John Gosselyn may refer to:

- John Gosselyn (MP for Weymouth) (fl. 1384–1386)
- John Gosselyn (MP for Lewes) (fl. 1417–1429)

== See also ==
- Jon Gosselin, American TV presenter
