= Wodefold =

Wodefold is an English surname. Notable people with the surname include:

- Giles Wodefold (fl. 1441–1449), MP for Lewes
- Robert Wodefold (fl. 1446–1447), MP for Lewes
