= Wolvehope =

Wolvehope is a surname. Notable people with the surname include:

- Galfridus de Wolvehope (fl. 1304–1313), English politician
- Gervasius de Wolvehope (fl. 1295–1302), English politician
