= Thomas Best =

Thomas Best may refer to:

== Politicians ==
- Thomas Best (MP for Canterbury) (c. 1713–1795), MP for Canterbury
- Thomas Best (MP for Lewes) (fl. 1446/7), MP for Lewes
- Thomas Best (MP for Ripon) (1589–c. 1649), MP for Ripon

== Others ==
- Thomas Best (navy captain) (1570?–1638?), English naval captain
- Thomas Best (basketball), played in 1980–81 NCAA Division I men's basketball season
- Thomas Best (writer), author of 1787 English book A Concise Treatise on the Art of Angling
- Tommy Best (1920–2018), Welsh footballer

== See also ==
- Thomas Best Woodward (1814–1875), Protestant chaplain in the County Gaol, Downpatrick and Dean of Down
- Thomas Alexander Vans Best, British colonial administrator
