= Williemus Serverleg =

Member of the Parliament of England

Williemus Serverleg (fl. 1298) was an English Member of Parliament (MP).

He was a Member of the Parliament of England for Lewes in 1298.

Parliament of England
Preceded by no return no return	Member of Parliament for Lewes; 1298; With: Gervasius de Wolvehope	Succeeded by Reginaldus de Combe; Rogerus Coppyng
