= Roger Forster =

Roger Forster may refer to:

- Roger T. Forster (1933–2024), theologian and leader of Ichthus Christian Fellowship
- Roger Forster (actor), see The Rules of the Game
- Roger Forster (MP) for Lewes 1406–1407
