= Palmere =

Palmere may refer to:

- Palmoli, also known as Palmere
- Ricardus de Palmere, English MP
