= Robert Gage (MP) =

16th-century English politician

Robert Gage (c. 1519 – 20 October 1587), of Haling, Surrey, was an English politician.

Robert Gage was born around 1519, the third son of Sir John Gage and Philippa Guildford, daughter of Sir Richard Guildford. He was a Member (MP) of the Parliament of England for Lewes in April 1554.

He married Elizabeth, daughter of Nicholas Wilford.

In 1577 he was said to be ‘the Queen’s majesty’s prisoner in his own house’ when reported for not attending church. His elder son Robert was executed 21 September 1586 for complicity in the Babington Plot and the younger, John, was imprisoned as a recusant.

Gage died at Haling on 20 Oct. 1587. His lordship of Haling and manor of Truchante descended to his surviving son John Gage, then aged 24, who was the father of Sir Henry Gage the royalist.

Parliament of England
Preceded by Henry Hussey; George Darrell	Member of Parliament for Lewes; 1554; With: George Darrell	Succeeded by John Stempe; John Morley
