= William Christie (Conservative politician) =

British politician (1830–1913)

William Langham Christie (31 May 1830 – 28 November 1913) of Glyndebourne, Sussex, and Tapeley, North Devon, was a British Conservative Party politician.

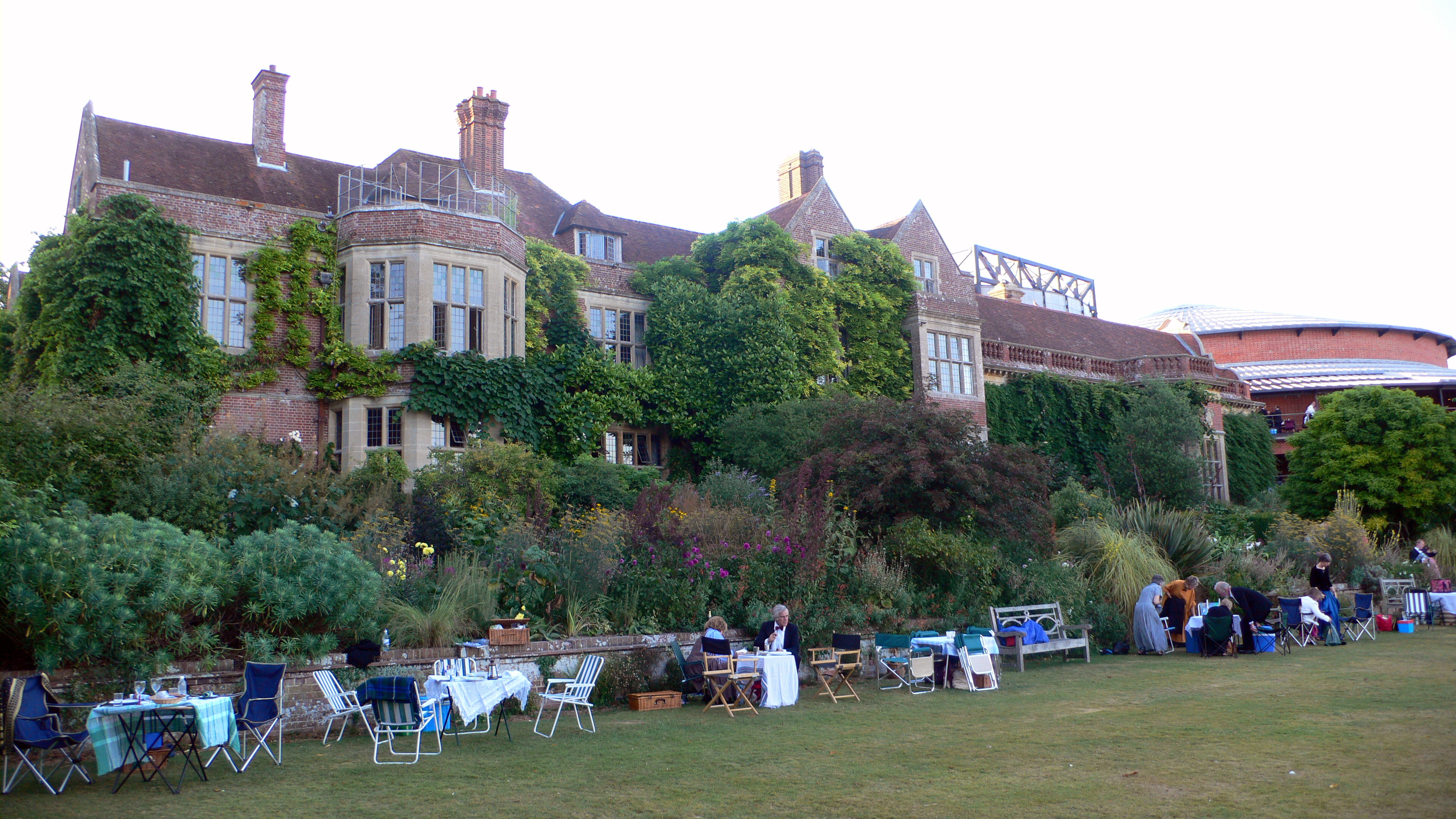
Glyndebourne, Sussex

He was the son of Langham Christie, who had inherited Glyndebourne, the Sussex country house now famous for its music festival, after paying off a rival family claimant. William succeeded his father in 1861.

William was the grandson of Daniel Beat Christin, a Swiss of obscure origins who anglicised his surname to Christie on entering the service of the East India Company and who retired to England in the 1780s having made a sudden fortune and an advantageous marriage to the daughter of Sir Purbeck Langham which brought Glyndebourne into the Christin/Christie family.

During the 1870s William made substantial alterations to Glyndebourne, adding a brick extension, ornate stonework and balustrading. In 1876 he engaged architect Ewan Christian to install bay windows and add decorative brickwork to give the house its current Jacobean appearance.

He was elected as the Member of Parliament (MP) for Lewes at the 1874 general election, having unsuccessfully contested the seat in 1865 and 1868. He was the first Conservative MP to represent Lewes in the House of Commons since Henry Fitzroy had died in 1860. Christie was re-elected in 1880, and retired from Parliament at the 1885 general election.

== Family ==
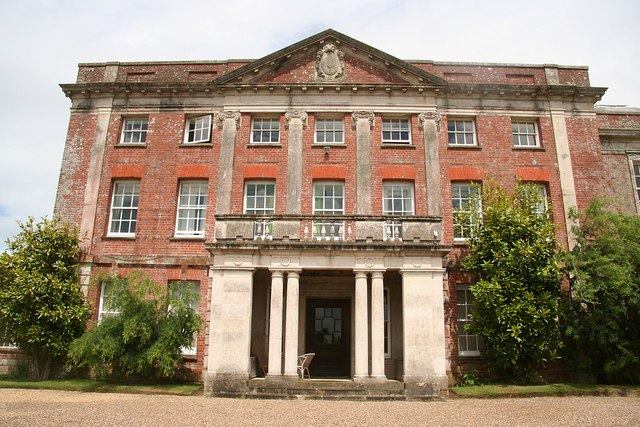
Tapeley Park, Devon

He married in 1855 Agnes Hamilton Clevland, who was heir to Tapeley Park in Devon, which the couple rebuilt with a "severe brick facade".

Their children were Augustus Langham Christie and Agnes Chichester Dixon-Hartland. Glyndebourne and Tapeley passed to John Christie, the son of Augustus Langham.

Parliament of the United Kingdom
Preceded by Lord Pelham	Member of Parliament for Lewes; 1874–1885	Succeeded by Sir Henry Aubrey-Fletcher, Bt
