= Rogerus Coppyng =

English Member of Parliament c. 1301

Rogerus Coppyng (fl. 1300/1301) was an English Member of Parliament.

He was a Member (MP) of the Parliament of England for Lewes in 1300/1301.

Parliament of England
Preceded by Gervasius de Wolvehope; Williemus Serverleg	Member of Parliament for Lewes; 1300/1301; With: Reginaldus de Combe	Succeeded by Gervasius de Wolvehope; Ricardus le Palmere
