= Basil Hall (Labour politician) =

British Labour Party activist and lifeboat sailor

Basil William Reid Hall (31 October 1865 – 10 August 1942) was a British Labour Party activist and lifeboat sailor.

Born in Sunderland, Hall was educated at Versailles, and at Twyford School in Winchester. He joined the Royal Navy in 1878, training on HMS Britannia. He reached the rank of captain, but left in 1894 to join the Royal National Lifeboat Institution (RNLI), becoming an inspector of lifeboats, and also lecturing in support of the organisation. In 1914, he led the rescue operation of SS Rohilla, for which he received the Silver Medal of the RNLI.

Hall became active in the Fabian Society, serving on its executive initially in 1909, and devoting more time to politics after his retirement, in 1919. He was again elected to the Fabian Society's executive in 1924, and taking a prominent role in organising the society's summer school. He was also the chair of the 1917 Club, and served on the Labour Army and Navy Advisory Committee.

Through the Fabian Society, Hall became active in the Labour Party, for which he stood unsuccessfully in Lewes at the 1923 United Kingdom general election, 1924 by-election, and 1924 United Kingdom general election, and Lowestoft at the 1929 United Kingdom general election.
