= Tring (disambiguation) =

Tring is a market town in Hertfordshire, England.

Tring may also refer to:

- Tring Athletic F.C.
- Tring (hundred), a historical administrative division
- Tring language, one of the languages of Borneo
- Simon Tring, English MP
- Tring, a fire monster from the game My Singing Monsters
