= William Cantrell (disambiguation) =

William Cantrell (1908–1996) was an American powerboat and IndyCar racer.

William Cantrell or Bill Cantrell may also refer to:

- William Cantrell (MP) (died 1585), MP for Lewes
- Willard Cantrell (1914–1986), American midget and sprint car racer
- Bill Cantrell, record producer, owner of Hi Records
