= George Shiffner =

British politician

Sir George Shiffner, 1st Baronet (17 November 1762 – 3 February 1842), was a British politician.

Shiffner was the son of Henry Shiffner of Pontrilas, Herefordshire and Mary Jackson. He spent five years in the 11th Regiment of Light Dragoons as a cornet (the rank of cornet was replaced by sub-lieutenant in the Regulation of the Forces Act 1871). He took his oath of qualification at the Epiphany sessions in 1803 to become a justice of the peace. He was a captain of the Lewes Troop of Yeomanry and Captain of the South Lewes Volunteer Battalion during the Revolutionary and Napoleonic Wars. Shiffner was held in such high esteem locally that he was considered as a Tory candidate for Sussex in the 1807 election. John 'Mad Jack' Fuller, Shiffner's wife's second cousin, had been a member of Parliament for Sussex since Shiffner proposed him in 1801. Fuller was becoming increasingly unpopular because of his outspoken defence of slavery in the colonies. Shiffner declined the offer and successfully ran as MP for Lewes where he sat from 1812 to 1826. On 16 December 1818 he was created a baronet, of Coombe in the County of Sussex. Coombe Place is at Offham in the parish of Hamsey, East Sussex, approximately three miles (5 km) north of Lewes.

Shiffner married Mary Bridger, daughter of Sir John Bridger and Rebecca Eliot, on 31 October 1787. They had four sons and four daughters. He died on 3 February 1842. His granddaughter, Emily Charlotte Shiffner (1842–1922), married Admiral Sir Francis Charles Bridgeman Bridgeman on 6 November 1889.

Parliament of the United Kingdom
Preceded by Henry Shelley; Thomas Read Kemp	Member of Parliament for Lewes; 1812–1826; With: Thomas Read Kemp 1812–1816; Sir John Shelley, Bt 1816–1826	Succeeded by Sir John Shelley, Bt; Thomas Read Kemp
Baronetage of the United Kingdom
New creation	Baronet (of Coombe); 1818–1842	Succeeded by Henry Shiffner
