= Thomas Best (MP for Lewes) =

English politician

Thomas Best (fl. 1446–1447) was an English politician.

He was a member (MP) of the parliament of England for Lewes from 1446 to 1447.

Parliament of England
Preceded by Edward Mylle; Giles Wodefold	Member of Parliament for Lewes; 1446–1447; With: Robert Wodefold	Succeeded by Giles Wodefold; William Godeman
