= John Blencowe =

British politician

John Blencowe MP

Member of Parliament for Lewes
- In office 16 January 1860 – 13 July 1865 Serving with Henry Brand
- Preceded by: Henry FitzRoy; Henry Brand
- Succeeded by: Henry Brand; Walter Pelham

Personal details
- Born: 28 February 1817
- Died: 28 April 1900 (aged 83)
- Party: Liberal
- Spouse: Frances Campion (m. 1857)
- Parent(s): Robert Willis Blencowe; Charlotte Elizabeth Poole

John George Blencowe (28 February 1817 – 28 April 1900) was a British Liberal Party politician.

== Family ==
Blencowe was the son of Robert Willis Blencowe and Charlotte Elizabeth Poole. He married Frances Campion, daughter of William John Campion (the younger) and Frances Read Kemp, in July 1857. Together they had eight children:

- Robert Campion Blencowe (1858–1905)
- John Ingham Blencowe (born 1860)
- William Poole Blencowe (1869–1900)
- Florence Charlotte Blencowe (1859–1944)
- Harriet Blencowe (1862–1943)
- Frances Isabel Blencowe (born 1864)
- Mary Blencowe (born 1865)
- Elizabeth Penelope Blencowe (born 1867)

== Political career ==
He was elected MP for Lewes at a by-election in 1860 but stood down at the next election in 1865.

== Other activities ==
Blencowe was also a justice of the peace and deputy lieutenant for Sussex.

Parliament of the United Kingdom
Preceded by Henry FitzRoy; Henry Brand	Member of Parliament for Lewes; 1860–1865; With: Henry Brand	Succeeded by Henry Brand; Walter Pelham
