= William Pedersen =

William Pedersen may refer to:

- William Pedersen (architect) (born 1938), American architect
- William Pedersen (politician) (1883–1970), American-born politician in Saskatchewan, Canada

== See also ==
- William Peterson (disambiguation)
