= 1847 Lewes by-election =

1847 United Kingdom Election

The 1847 Lewes by-election was an uncontested election held on 17 March 1847. The by-election was brought about due to the resignation of the incumbent Whig MP, Sir Howard Elphinstone. It was won by the Whig/Liberal candidate Robert Perfect, who was the only declared candidate.

== See also ==
- List of United Kingdom by-elections (1832–1847)
