= 1910 Lewes by-election =

UK Parliamentary by-election

The 1910 Lewes by-election was held on 17 June 1910. The by-election was held due to the death of the incumbent Conservative MP, Sir Henry Aubrey-Fletcher. It was won by the Conservative candidate William Campion, who was unopposed.
