= Robert Wodefold =

English politician

Robert Wodefold (fl. 1446–1447) was an English politician.

He was a member (MP) of the parliament of England for Lewes in the 1447 Parliament.

Parliament of England
Preceded by Edward Mylle; Giles Wodefold	Member of Parliament for Lewes; 1447; With: Thomas Best	Succeeded by Giles Wodefold; William Godeman
