= Sir Charles Blunt, 4th Baronet =

British Member of Parliament

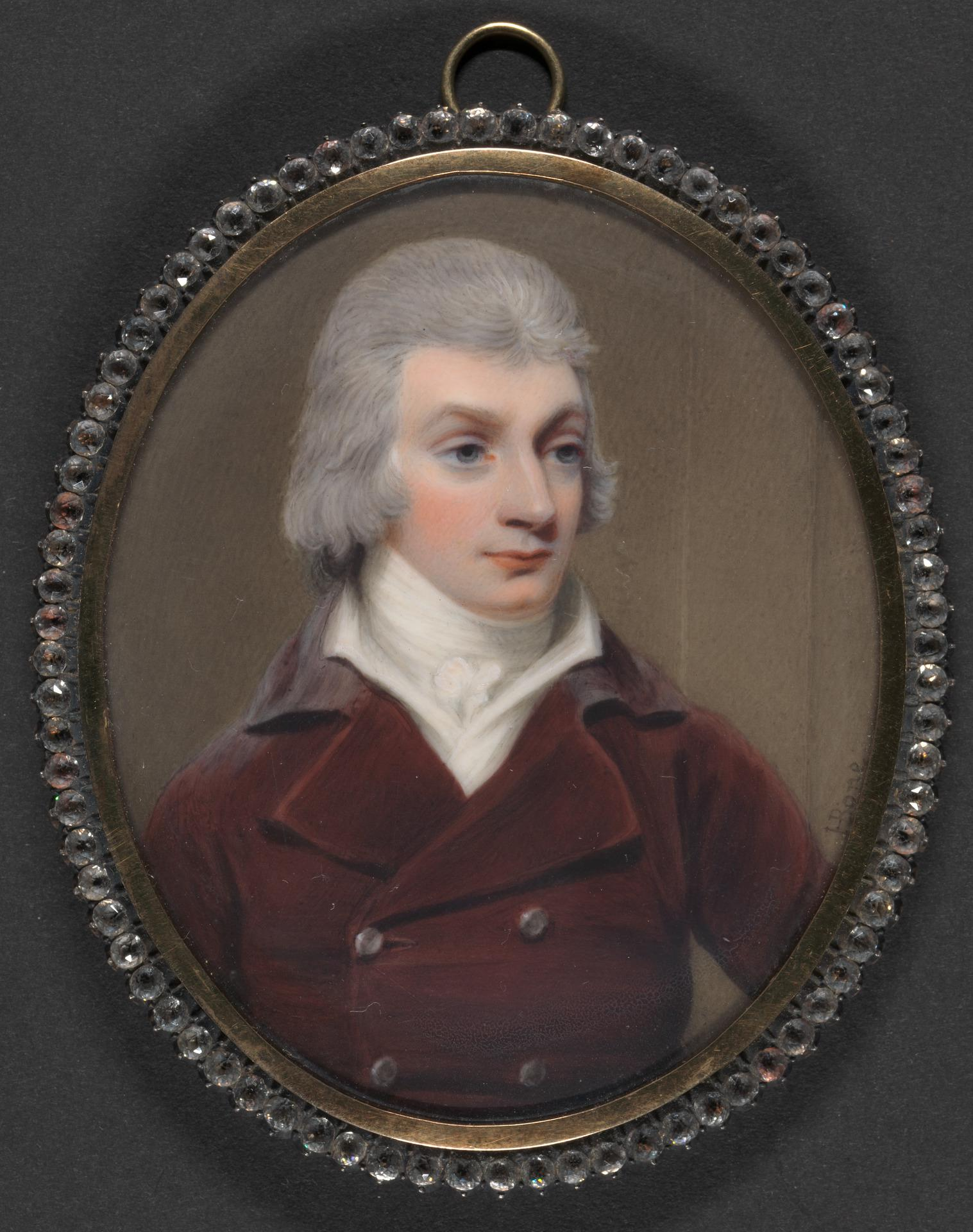
Painting by Henry Bone - Sir Charles Blunt, fourth Baronet

Sir Charles Richard Blunt, 4th Baronet (6 December 1775 – 29 February 1840) was a British Member of Parliament.

Blunt was the eldest son of Sir Charles William Blunt, 3rd Baronet, and his wife Elizabeth (née Peers), and succeeded his father in the baronetcy in 1802. He served with the East India Company and also represented Lewes in the House of Commons from 1831 until his death. Blunt married Sophia, daughter of Joseph Baker, in 1824. He died in February 1840, aged 64, and was succeeded in his title by his son Walter. Lady Blunt died in 1862.

Parliament of the United Kingdom
Preceded by Sir John Shelley; Thomas Read Kemp	Member of Parliament for Lewes; 1831–1840; With: Thomas Read Kemp 1831–1837; Henry Fitzroy 1837–1840	Succeeded by Henry Fitzroy; Viscount Cantelupe
Baronetage of Great Britain
Preceded by Charles William Blunt	Baronet (of London); 1802–1840	Succeeded by Walter Blunt
