= Richard Amhurst =

English lawyer and politician

Richard Amhurst (c. 1565 – c. 1631) was an English lawyer and politician who sat in the House of Commons between 1614 and 1622.

Amhurst matriculated at St John's College, Oxford on 6 July 1582, aged 17 when he was of Bay Hall in Pembury, Kent, and of Lewes, Sussex. He was called to the bar at Gray's Inn in 1592, and became a bencher of his Inn in 1612. In 1614, he was elected Member of Parliament for Lewes. He was re-elected MP for Lewes in 1621. He went out on 2 August 1623 as serjeant-at-law. He founded the almshouses at Pembury.

Amhurst died between 8 August 1630 when he made his will and 3 May 1632 when it was proved.

Parliament of England
Preceded by John Shirley; Sir Henry Nevill	Member of Parliament for Lewes; 1614–1622; With: Christopher Neville 1614; Sir George Goring	Succeeded by Christopher Newell; Sir George Goring
