= Robert Perfect =

Member of Parliament for Lewes
- In office 17 March 1847 – 6 July 1852 Serving with Henry FitzRoy
- Preceded by: Henry FitzRoy; Howard Elphinstone
- Succeeded by: Henry FitzRoy; Henry Brand

Personal details
- Born: 1790
- Died: 29 July 1875 (aged 84–85)
- Party: Whig

Robert Perfect (1790 – 29 July 1875) was a British Whig politician.

Perfect was elected a Whig Member of Parliament for Lewes at a by-election in 1847—caused by the resignation of Sir Howard Elphinstone, 2nd Baronet—and held the seat until 1852 when he did not seek re-election.

Parliament of the United Kingdom
Preceded by Henry FitzRoy; Howard Elphinstone	Member of Parliament for Lewes; 1847–1852; With: Henry FitzRoy	Succeeded by Henry FitzRoy; Henry Brand
