= Richard atte Gate =

English politician

Richard atte Gate (fl. 1379–1388) was an English politician and cloth merchant. He sat as MP for Lewes in September 1388.
