= Walter Pelham, 4th Earl of Chichester =

British politician (1838–1902)

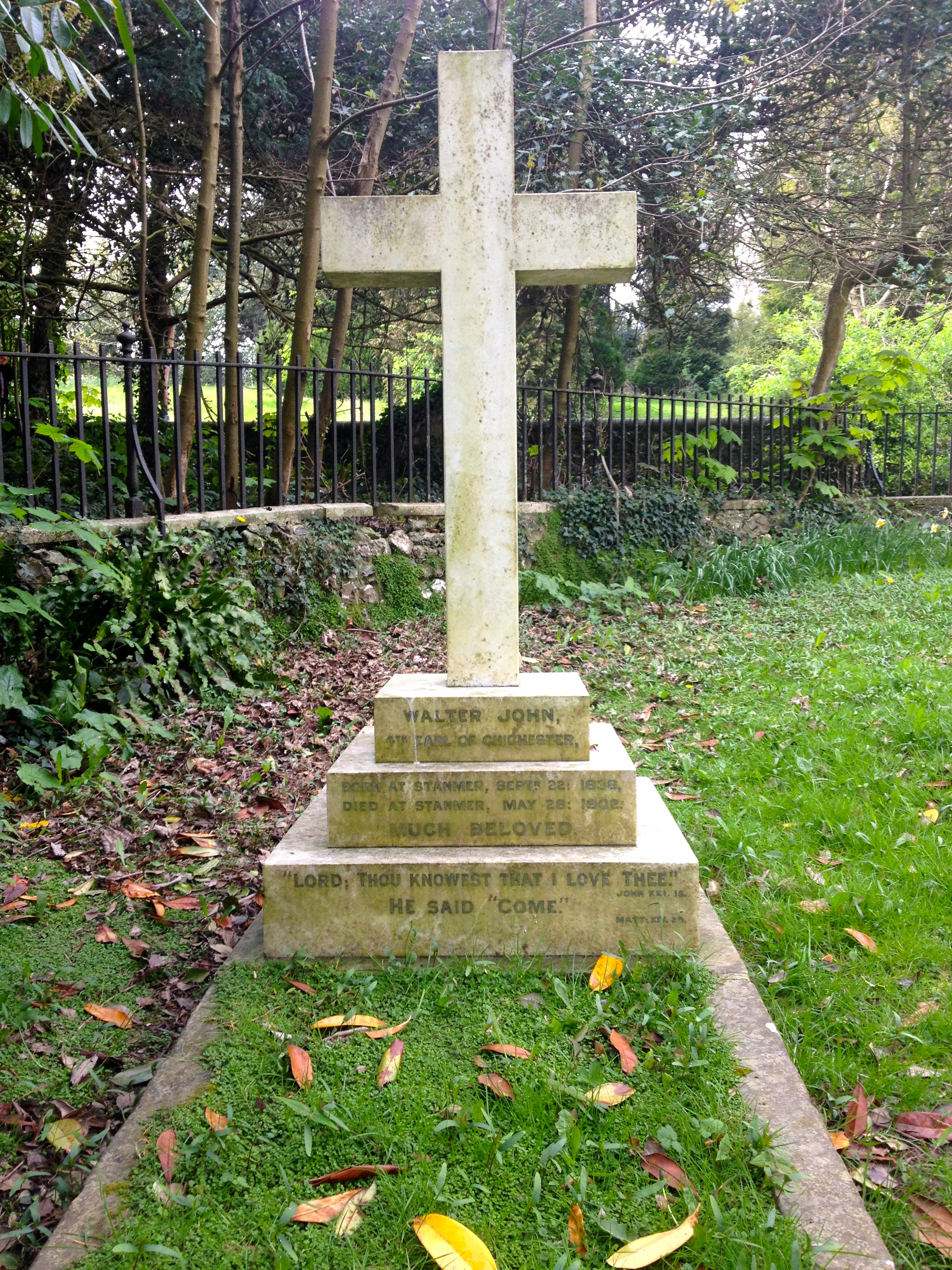
Grave of Walter Pelham, 4th Earl of Chichester. Stanmer Church, Sussex.

Walter John Pelham, 4th Earl of Chichester (22 September 1838 – 28 May 1902), styled as Lord Pelham from 1838 to 1886, was a British Liberal politician.

Pelham was the eldest son of Henry Pelham, 3rd Earl of Chichester, and his wife Lady Mary Brudenell, daughter of Robert Brudenell, 6th Earl of Cardigan. He was educated at Harrow and Trinity College, Cambridge, where he took his degree in 1859. In 1865 he was elected to the House of Commons for Lewes, a seat he held until 1874. He also served as Alderman for East Sussex, deputy lieutenant of Sussex and of Kent, and succeeding his father, as President of Brighton College.

Lord Chichester married, in 1861, Elizabeth Mary Bligh, only daughter of the Hon. Sir John Duncan Bligh. They had no children. He died at his residence Stanmer House on 28 May 1902, aged 63, and is buried in Stanmer churchyard. He was succeeded in his titles by his younger brother Reverend Francis Pelham. Lady Chichester died in December 1911, aged 74.

Coat of arms of Walter Pelham, 4th Earl of Chichester
Coronet A coronet of an Earl Crest A peacock in pride argent. Escutcheon Quarterly: 1st and 4th azure, three pelicans vulning themselves argent; 2nd and 3rd gules, two pieces of belts with buckles, erect in pale, the buckles upwards argent. Supporters Dexter, a horse of a mouse dun colour; Sinister, a bear proper, each collared with a belt, buckle and pendant or. Motto Vincit amor patriae (The love of my country will prevail). Badge The buckle of a belt or.

Parliament of the United Kingdom
Preceded by Henry Brand; John Blencowe	Member of Parliament for Lewes; 1865–1874; With: Henry Brand to 1868	Succeeded by William Christie
Peerage of the United Kingdom
Preceded by Henry Thomas Pelham	Earl of Chichester; 1886–1902	Succeeded by Francis Godolphin Pelham
