= Sir Henry Aubrey-Fletcher, 4th Baronet =

British politician

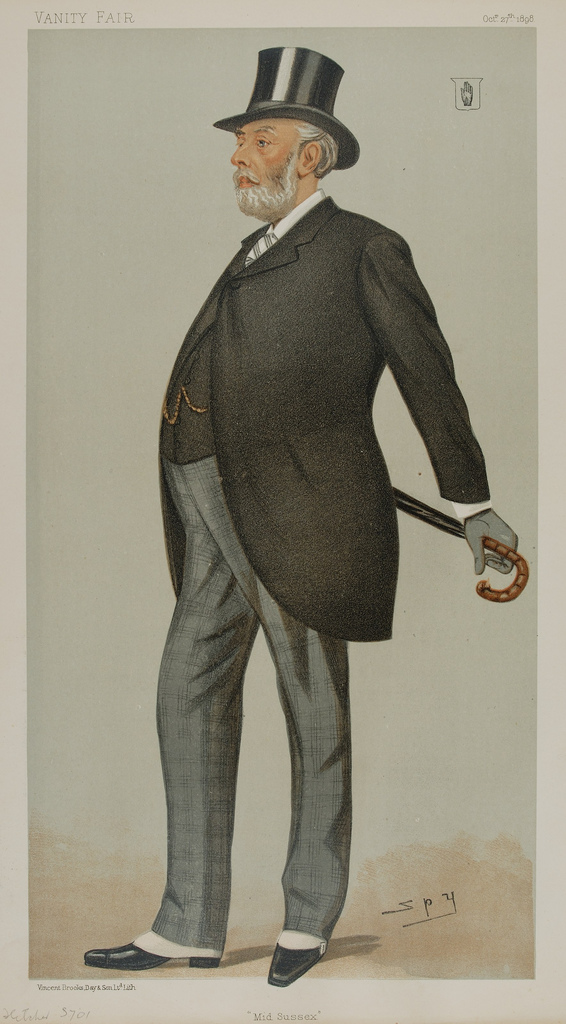
"Mid Sussex" Fletcher as caricatured by Spy (Leslie Ward) in Vanity Fair, October 1898

Sir Henry Aubrey-Fletcher, 4th Baronet, CB, PC (24 September 1835 – 19 May 1910), born Henry Fletcher, was a Member of Parliament in the United Kingdom, and President of Worthing Golf Club from 1909 - 1910.

The eldest son and second child of Sir Henry Fletcher, 3rd Baronet (born 1807) and Emily Maria Browne, he succeeded to the baronetcy on 6 September 1851 upon the death of his father. In 1903, he had his name changed under Royal Licence to Henry Aubrey-Fletcher to reflect his inheritance from the Aubrey estate.

Before his service in Parliament, he had been a lieutenant in the Grenadier Guards and then after retirement from the Regular Army he had been appointed a supernumerary lieutenant-colonel in the part-time 2nd Sussex Rifle Volunteers on 6 May 1874. He succeeded to the command of the battalion in 1882 and held it until 1897. Then as a colonel he commanded the Sussex & Kent Volunteer Infantry Brigade until 1904. He was Chairman of the National Rifle Association and during the Boer War was a strong advocate that rifle clubs should be formed throughout the country with the aim that every able-bodied man be enabled to be an effective shot.

Fletcher represented the Conservatives in the House of Commons as the Member of Parliament for Horsham from 1880 to 1885 and Lewes from 1885 until his death in 1910. He was made a Companion of the Order of the Bath in 1900, and a Privy Counsellor in December 1901.

Aubrey-Fletcher donated £10 in 1905 to the Holy Innocents Church in Southwater. He was a significant land owner in the area.

The town of Worthing conferred upon him the honorary freedom of the borough in October 1901, for services rendered to the town.

He died without any children and was thus succeeded to the baronetcy by his younger brother, Lancelot Aubrey-Fletcher who also changed his name.

== Arms ==
Coat of arms of Sir Henry Aubrey-Fletcher, 4th Baronet
Crest: 1. A horse's head argent charged with a trefoil gules (Fletcher); 2. An eagle's head erased or (Aubrey).; Escutcheon Quarterly: 1st and 4th, sable, a cross engrailed argent, between four plates, each charged with an arrow of the first (Fletcher), 2nd and 3rd, azure, a chevron between three eagle’s heads erased or (Aubrey) Motto Martis non Cupidinis (Belonging to Mars, not Cupid) Orders Most Honourable Order of the Bath (Civil Division) - Companion (CB)

== Sources ==
Parliament of the United Kingdom
Preceded by James Clifton Brown	Member of Parliament for Horsham; 1880–1885	Succeeded by Sir Walter Barttelot, Bt.
Preceded by William Langham Christie	Member of Parliament for Lewes; 1885–1910	Succeeded by William Campion
Baronetage of Great Britain
Preceded by Henry Fletcher	Baronet (of Clea); 1851–1910	Succeeded by Lancelot Aubrey-Fletcher
