= Lewes (constituency) =

Parliamentary constituency in the United Kingdom, 1868 onwards

Coordinates: 50.85°N 0.06°E

- County constituency for the House of Commons
- Interactive map of boundaries since 2024
- Boundary within South East England
- County: East Sussex
- Electorate: 75,091 (2023)
- Major settlements: Lewes; Newhaven; Seaford

Current constituency
- Created: 1295
- Member of Parliament: James MacCleary (Liberal Democrats)

Lewes is a constituency (Note: A county constituency (for the purposes of election expenses and type of returning officer)) in East Sussex represented in the House of Commons of the UK Parliament since 2024 by James MacCleary, a Liberal Democrat.

== Constituency profile ==
Lewes is a rural constituency in East Sussex. It is named after the town of Lewes, although its largest town is Seaford which has a population of around 24,000. Other settlements in the constituency include the towns of Newhaven and Polegate and the villages of Willingdon, Stone Cross, Ringmer and Ditchling. Lewes is a traditional market town known for its 11th-century castle, Seaford is a seaside resort town and Newhaven is an important local port and ferry terminal with regular services to Dieppe in France. The constituency's towns are well-connected by rail to nearby Brighton and Eastbourne. The constituency has average levels of wealth; there is some deprivation in Newhaven whilst the rural parts of the constituency are generally affluent. On average, house prices are lower than the rest of South East England but higher than the national average.

The constituency has a large retired population giving it a high average age. Residents have high rates of homeownership and average levels of education, income and professional employment. The rate of child poverty is low and few residents claim unemployment benefits. A high proportion of residents work in the public sector. White people made up 95% of the population at the 2021 census. At the local council level, the coastal towns and the inland areas west of Lewes are mostly represented by Liberal Democrats, Lewes and the rural areas to its east elected Green Party councillors and the settlements just north of Eastbourne elected Conservatives and independents. An estimated 52% of voters in the constituency supported remaining in the European Union in the 2016 referendum, above the nationwide figure of 48%.

== History ==
The constituency of Lewes has existed since commoners were first summoned to Parliament in 1295, the Model Parliament. This is the county town, though less significant in population today, far surpassed by the City of Brighton and Hove – it has nonetheless been continuously represented since that date.

Until 1885, Lewes was a Parliamentary Borough; until 1868, it was represented by two MPs in the House of Common. This was reduced to one by the Reform Act 1867. Under the Redistribution of Seats Act 1885, the seat was converted to a division of the county of Sussex.

From 1874 until 1997, the constituency's electorate returned only Conservative MPs. In the 1997 general election, the seat was won by Norman Baker for the Liberal Democrats. He retained the seat at the subsequent three elections until he was defeated at the 2015 general election by the Conservative's Maria Caulfield. She won again in 2017 and 2019, but was defeated at the 2024 general election by James MacCleary of the Liberal Democrats.

== Boundaries ==
Map of boundaries 2010–2024

1885–1918: The Borough of Brighton, the Sessional Divisions of Hove and Worthing, and parts of the Sessional Divisions of Lewes and Steyning.

1918–1950: The Borough of Lewes, the Urban Districts of Newhaven, Portslade-by-Sea, and Seaford, and the Rural Districts of Chailey, Newhaven, and Steyning East.

1950–1955: The Borough of Lewes, the Urban Districts of Burgess Hill, Newhaven, and Seaford, the Rural District of Chailey, and parts of the Rural Districts of Cuckfield and Hailsham.

1955–1974: The Borough of Lewes, the Urban Districts of Burgess Hill, Newhaven, and Seaford, the Rural District of Chailey, and part of the Rural District of Cuckfield.

1974–1983: The Borough of Lewes, the Urban Districts of Newhaven and Seaford, the Rural District of Chailey, and part of the Rural District of Hailsham.

1983–1997: The District of Lewes, and the District of Wealden wards of Alfriston, Arlington, and East Dean.

1997–2010: The District of Lewes wards of Barcombe, Chailey, Ditchling, Hamsey, Kingston, Lewes Bridge, Lewes Castle, Lewes Priory, Newhaven Denton, Newhaven Meeching, Newhaven Valley, Newick, Ouse Valley, Plumpton, Ringmer, Seaford Central, Seaford East, Seaford North, Seaford West, and Wivelsfield.

2010–2024: The District of Lewes wards of Barcombe and Hamsey, Chailey and Wivelsfield, Ditchling and Westmeston, Kingston, Lewes Bridge, Lewes Castle, Lewes Priory, Newhaven Denton and Meeching, Newhaven Valley, Newick, Ouse Valley and Ringmer, Plumpton, Streat, East Chiltington and St John Without, Seaford Central, Seaford East, Seaford North, Seaford South, and Seaford West; and the District of Wealden wards of Alfriston, Arlington, East Dean, Polegate North, and Polegate South.

2024–present: The District of Lewes wards of Ditchling & Westmeston, Kingston, Lewes Bridge, Lewes Castle, Lewes Priory, Newhaven North, Newhaven South, Ouse Valley & Ringmer, Plumpton, Streat, East Chiltington & St John, Seaford Central, Seaford East, Seaford North, Seaford South, and Seaford West; and the District of Wealden wards of Arlington, Lower Willingdon, Polegate Central, Polegate North, Polegate South & Willingdon Watermill, South Downs, Stone Cross, and Upper Willingdon.

Three small rural District of Lewes wards were included in the new constituency of East Grinstead and Uckfield, offset by the addition of parts of the District of Wealden, including the communities of Willingdon (from Eastbourne) and Stone Cross (from Bexhill and Battle).

== Members of Parliament ==
=== MPs 1295–1660 ===
- Constituency created 1295

Parliament	First member	Second member
1295	Gervasius de Wolvehope	Ricardus le Palmere
1297	No return	
1298	Gervasius de Wolvehope	Williemus Serverleg
1300/1	Reginaldus de Combe	Rogerus Coppyng
1302	Gervasius de Wolvehope	Ricardus le Palmere
1304/5	Galfridus de Wolvehope	Walterus Nyng
1307	Robertus le Bynt	Walterus le Fust
1309	Simon Tring	Johannes Arnald
1311	Simon Tring	Ricardus le Hurt
1313 (Jul)	Willielmus de la Chapele	Galfridus de Wolvehope
1313 (Sep)	Simon Tring	Johannes Gouman
1319	Willielmus Walewere	Henricus de Rudham
1320	Thomas atte Novene	Radulphus atte Lote
1322 (May)	Philippus le Mareschal	Thomas de Lofelde
1322 (Nov)	Robertus le Spicer	Ricardus le Poleter
1323	Willielmus Walewere	Robertus le Spicer
1327	No return	
1328	Willielmus Darnel	Johannes le Bake
1329/30	Walterus atte Markette	Ricardus le Hurt
1330	Thomas Comyn	Stephanus le Boche
1331/2	Thomas Comyn	Johannes Scoteryld
1333/4	Robertus ?	
1334–1347	No names known	
1348	Ricardus Ploket	Johannes Payn
1350	Willielmus Gardyner	Willielmus Darnel
1354	Willielmus Darnel	Willielmus Gardiner
1355	Willielmus Darnel	Willielmus Gardiner
1357/8	Robertus atte Brouke	Ricardus Crompe
1360	Thomas Lyndefelde	Willielmus Bocher
1360/1	Ricardus Ferour de Lewes	Thomas Lyndefeld
1362	Robertus Norton	Willielmus Swon
1363	Willielmus Spicer	Thomas Norays
1366	Willielmus Boteller	Stephanus Holte
1368	Robertus de York	Robertus Norton
1369	Robertus de York	Jacobus Ferrour
1371	Henricus Werkeman	
1372	Jacobus Ferour	Thomas Norays
1373	Robertus de York	Stephanus Holte
1376/7	Willielmus Spicer	Jacobus Ferour
1378	Jacobus Ferour	Johannes Shereve
1379/80	Robertus de York	Johannes Peyntour
1381	Henricus Werkeman	Robertus Norton
1382	Henricus Werkeman	Thomas Norrys
1382/3	Stephanus Holte	Johannes Goderyk
1383	Robertus de York	Willielmus Spicer
1384	Thomas Norrys	Willielmus Spicer
1385	Thomas Norris	Stephen Holt
1388 (Feb)	Stephen Holt	Thomas Norris
1388 (Sep)	Richard atte Gate	Walter Gosselyn
1390 (Jan)		
1390 (Nov)		
1391	John Bedford	Thomas Norris
1393	William Chepelond	John Godeman
1394		
1395	John Maryot	John Sadeler
1397 (Jan)	John Godeman	John Plomer
1397 (Sep)	John Godeman	John Maryot
1399	William Chepelond	John Maryot
1401	John Mason	John Maryot
1402	Robert Bynt	John Maryot
1404 (Jan)		
1404 (Oct)		
1406	Roger Forster	William Green
1407	Roger Forster	William Hyde
1410		
1411		
1413 (Feb)		
1413 (May)	Andrew Blake	John Maryot
1414 (Apr)		
1414 (Nov)	John Hert	Robert Lytcombe
1415		
1416 (Mar)	William Chepelond	William Northampton
1416 (Oct)		
1417	John Gosselyn	John Parker
1419	Andrew Blake	William Fagger
1420	John Gosselyn	Thomas White
1421 (May)	William Fagger	William Northampton
1421 (Dec)	Thomas White	William Wodefold
1422	William Vaggere	Andreas Mauffay
1423	William Wodefold	Andreas Mafay
1425	William Fagger	John Gosselyn
1425/6	William Penbrugge	William Feret
1427	John Godeman	Roger Forster
1429	Thomas White	John Gosselyn
1430/1	John Rodys	Richard Brasier
1432	Thomas White	William Penbrygge
1433	John Rodys	William Penbrygge
1435	Thomas White	John Wody
1436/7	William Thwaytes	John Hanmere
1441/2	Edward Mylle	Giles Wodefold
1446/7	Robert Wodefold	Thomas Best
1448/9 (Feb)	Giles Wodefold	William Godeman
1449 (Nov)	John Southwell	William Delve
1450	John Southwell	John Beckwith
1452/3	John Parker	John Southwell
1459	Richard Fairegoo	Thomas Sherman
1460	John Beckwith	Thomas Best
1467	Thomas Lewknor	John Sherman
1472	Christopher Furnes	William Cook
1477/8	William Cooke	John Baker
1510–1523	No names known	
1529	Sir Edward Bray	John Batenore
1536	?	
1539	?	
1542	John Kyme	?
1545	?	
1547	Sir Walter Mildmay	Sir Anthony Cooke
1553 (Mar)	John Southcote	Thomas Gravesend
1553 (Oct)	Sir Henry Hussey	George Darrell
1554 (Apr)	Robert Gage	George Darrell
1554 (Nov)	John Stempe	John Morley
1555	William Devenish	Thomas Gravesend
1558	John Gage	William Peterson
1558/9	George Goring I	Thomas Saunder
1562/3	George Goring I	William Cantrell
1571	William Morley	Edward Fenner
1572	Edward Bellingham	John Shirley
1584	Richard Browne	Thomas Pelham
1586	Richard Browne	Francis Alford
1588	Robert Sackville	John Shirley
1593	Sir Henry Glemham	George Goring II
1597	Sir Henry Glemham	John Shirley
1601	George Goring II	Goddard Pemberton, sat for Peterborough and replaced by Sir Percival Hart
1604	John Shirley	Sir Henry Nevill
1614	Christopher Neville	Richard Amhurst
1621	Sir George Goring	Richard Amhurst
1624	Sir George Goring	Christopher Neville
1625	Sir George Goring	Sir George Rivers
1626	Sir George Goring	Sir George Rivers
Feb 1628	Anthony Stapley	Sir George Goring
Jul 1628	Anthony Stapley	Jerome Weston
1629–1640	No Parliaments summoned	
1640 (Apr)	Anthony Stapley, sat for Sussex replaced by Herbert Morley	James Rivers
1641	Herbert Morley	Henry Shelley
1645	Herbert Morley	Henry Shelley
1648	Herbert Morley	Henry Shelley
1653	Lewes not represented in Barebones Parliament	
1654	Henry Shelley	(one seat only)
1656	Anthony Stapley	(one seat only)
1659	Herbert Morley	Richard Boughton

=== MPs 1660–1868 ===
Election	First member	First party	Second member	Second party
1660	Nizel Rivers		Sir John Stapley	
1661	Sir Thomas Woodcock		Sir John Stapley	
Feb 1679	William Morley		Richard Bridger	
Aug 1679	Thomas Pelham		Richard Bridger	
1695	Thomas Pelham		Henry Pelham	
Jan 1701	Thomas Pelham		Sir Thomas Trevor	
Nov 1701	Thomas Pelham		Henry Pelham	
Jul 1702	Thomas Pelham		Richard Payne	
Nov 1702	Sir Nicholas Pelham		Richard Payne	
1705	Thomas Pelham		Richard Payne	
May 1708	Thomas Pelham		Peter Gott	
Dec 1708	Thomas Pelham		Samuel Gott	
1710	Thomas Pelham		Peter Gott	
1712	Thomas Pelham		John Morley Trevor	
1719	Thomas Pelham		Philip Yorke	
1722	Thomas Pelham		Henry Pelham	
1726	Thomas Pelham		Sir Nicholas Pelham	
1727	Thomas Pelham		Thomas Pelham	
1738	Thomas Pelham		John Trevor	
1741	Thomas Pelham		John Trevor	
1743	Sir John Shelley		Sir Francis Poole	
1747	Thomas Sergison		Sir Francis Poole	
1763	Thomas Sergison		William Plumer	
1766	Lord Edward Bentinck		William Plumer	
1768	Thomas Hampden	Whig	Thomas Hay	
1774	Sir Thomas Miller, Bt		Thomas Hay	
1780	Henry Pelham		Thomas Kemp	
1796	John Cressett-Pelham		Thomas Kemp	
1802	Henry Shelley	Tory	Lord Francis Osborne	Tory
1806	Henry Shelley	Tory	Thomas Kemp	Whig
1811	Henry Shelley	Tory	Thomas Read Kemp	Whig
1812	Sir George Shiffner	Tory	Thomas Read Kemp	Whig
1816	Sir George Shiffner	Tory	John Shelley	Tory
1826	Thomas Read Kemp	Whig	John Shelley	Tory
1831	Thomas Read Kemp	Whig	Sir Charles Blunt, Bt	Whig
1837	Henry FitzRoy	Conservative	Sir Charles Blunt, Bt	Whig
1840	Henry FitzRoy	Conservative	Viscount Cantelupe	Conservative
1841	Summers Harford	Radical	Sir Howard Elphinstone	Radical
1842	Henry FitzRoy	Conservative	Sir Howard Elphinstone	Radical
1847	Henry FitzRoy	Peelite	Robert Perfect	Whig
1852	Henry FitzRoy	Peelite	Henry Brand	Whig
1859	Henry FitzRoy	Liberal	Henry Brand	Liberal
1860	John Blencowe	Liberal	Henry Brand	Liberal
1865	Lord Pelham	Liberal	Henry Brand	Liberal
1868	Representation reduced to one			

=== MPs since 1868 ===
Election	Member	Party
1868	Walter Pelham	Liberal
1874	William Christie	Conservative
1885	Sir Henry Aubrey-Fletcher	Conservative
1910 by-election	William Campion	Conservative
1924 by-election	Tufton Percy Hamilton Beamish	Conservative
1931	John Loder	Conservative
1936 by-election	Tufton Percy Hamilton Beamish	Conservative
1945	Tufton Victor Hamilton Beamish	Conservative
February 1974	Tim Rathbone	Conservative
1997	Norman Baker	Liberal Democrat
2015	Maria Caulfield	Conservative
2024	James MacCleary	Liberal Democrat

== Elections since 1918 ==
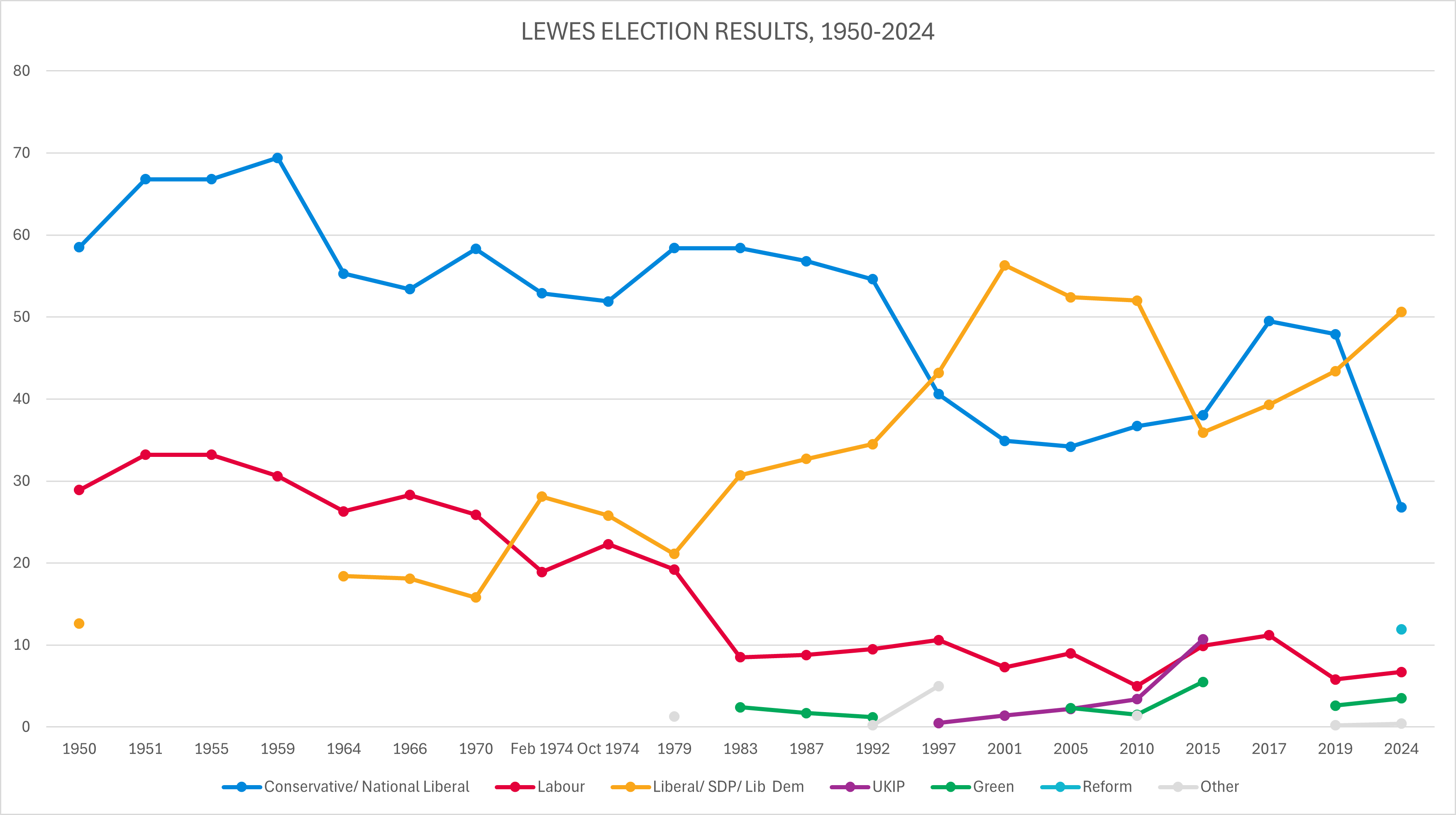
Election results 1950-2024

=== Elections in the 2020s ===
General election 2024: Lewes
Party	Candidate	Votes	%	±%
Liberal Democrats	James MacCleary	26,895	50.6	+9.5
Conservative	Maria Caulfield	14,271	26.8	−21.7
Reform	Bernard Brown	6,335	11.9	+11.7
Labour	Danny Sweeney	3,574	6.7	−0.4
Green	Paul Keene	1,869	3.5	+0.6
SDP	Rowena Mary Easton	229	0.4	N/A
Majority		12,624	23.8	N/A
Turnout		53,173	69.8	–4.2
Registered electors		76,166		
Liberal Democrats gain from Conservative		Swing	+15.6	

=== Elections in the 2010s ===
2019 notional result
Party	Vote	%
Conservative	26,977	48.5
Liberal Democrats	22,851	41.1
Labour	3,930	7.1
Green	1,587	2.9
Brexit Party	122	0.2
Others	113	0.2
Turnout	55,580	74.0
Electorate	75,091	

General election 2019: Lewes
Party	Candidate	Votes	%	±%
Conservative	Maria Caulfield	26,268	47.9	−1.6
Liberal Democrats	Oli Henman	23,811	43.4	+4.1
Labour	Kate Chappell	3,206	5.8	−5.4
Green	Johnny Denis	1,453	2.6	N/A
Independent	Paul Cragg	113	0.2	N/A
Majority		2,457	4.5	−5.7
Turnout		54,851	76.7	+0.3
Conservative hold		Swing	−2.8	

General election 2017: Lewes
Party	Candidate	Votes	%	±%
Conservative	Maria Caulfield	26,820	49.5	+11.5
Liberal Democrats	Kelly-Marie Blundell	21,312	39.3	+3.4
Labour	Daniel Chapman	6,060	11.2	+1.3
Majority		5,508	10.2	+8.1
Turnout		54,328	76.4	+3.7
Conservative hold		Swing	+4.0	

General election 2015: Lewes
Party	Candidate	Votes	%	±%
Conservative	Maria Caulfield	19,206	38.0	+1.3
Liberal Democrats	Norman Baker	18,123	35.9	−16.1
UKIP	Ray Finch	5,427	10.7	+7.3
Labour	Lloyd Russell-Moyle	5,000	9.9	+4.9
Green	Alfie Stirling	2,784	5.5	+4.0
Majority		1,083	2.1	N/A
Turnout		50,540	72.7	−0.2
Conservative gain from Liberal Democrats		Swing	+8.7	

General election 2010: Lewes
Party	Candidate	Votes	%	±%
Liberal Democrats	Norman Baker	26,048	52.0	−0.5
Conservative	Jason Sugarman	18,401	36.7	+2.1
Labour	Hratche Koundarjian	2,508	5.0	−4.3
UKIP	Peter Charlton	1,728	3.4	+1.2
Green	Susan Murray	729	1.5	−0.8
BNP	David Lloyd	594	1.2	N/A
Independent	Ondrej Soucek	80	0.2	N/A
Majority		7,647	15.3	−2.9
Turnout		50,088	72.9	+3.1
Liberal Democrats hold		Swing	−0.8	

=== Elections in the 2000s ===
General election 2005: Lewes
Party	Candidate	Votes	%	±%
Liberal Democrats	Norman Baker	24,376	52.4	−3.9
Conservative	Rory Love	15,902	34.2	−0.7
Labour	Richard Black	4,169	9.0	+1.7
Green	Susan Murray	1,071	2.3	N/A
UKIP	John Petley	1,034	2.2	+0.8
Majority		8,474	18.2	−3.2
Turnout		46,552	69.4	+0.9
Liberal Democrats hold		Swing	−1.6	

General election 2001: Lewes
Party	Candidate	Votes	%	±%
Liberal Democrats	Norman Baker	25,588	56.3	+13.1
Conservative	Simon Sinnatt	15,878	34.9	−5.7
Labour	Paul Richards	3,317	7.3	−3.3
UKIP	John Harvey	650	1.4	+0.9
Majority		9,710	21.4	+18.8
Turnout		45,433	68.5	−7.9
Liberal Democrats hold		Swing		

=== Elections in the 1990s ===
General election 1997: Lewes
Party	Candidate	Votes	%	±%
Liberal Democrats	Norman Baker	21,250	43.2	+4.1
Conservative	Tim Rathbone	19,950	40.6	−10.8
Labour	Mark Patton	5,232	10.6	+2.4
Referendum	Lucille Butler	2,481	5.0	N/A
UKIP	John Harvey	256	0.5	N/A
Majority		1,300	2.6	N/A
Turnout		49,169	76.4	−5.4
Liberal Democrats gain from Conservative		Swing		

This constituency underwent boundary changes between the 1992 and 1997 general elections and thus change in share of vote is based on a notional calculation.

General election 1992: Lewes
Party	Candidate	Votes	%	±%
Conservative	Tim Rathbone	33,042	54.6	−2.2
Liberal Democrats	Norman Baker	20,867	34.5	+1.8
Labour	Alison Chapman	5,758	9.5	+0.7
Green	A. E. Beaumont	719	1.2	−0.5
Natural Law	N. F. Clinch	87	0.2	N/A
Majority		12,175	20.1	−4.0
Turnout		60,473	81.8	+4.8
Conservative hold		Swing	−2.0	

=== Elections in the 1980s ===
General election 1987: Lewes
Party	Candidate	Votes	%	±%
Conservative	Tim Rathbone	32,016	56.8	−1.6
Alliance	David Bellotti	18,396	32.7	+2.0
Labour	Ralph Taylor	4,973	8.8	+0.3
Green	Andrew Sherwood	970	1.7	−0.7
Majority		13,620	24.1	−3.6
Turnout		56,355	77.0	+2.7
Conservative hold		Swing		

General election 1983: Lewes
Party	Candidate	Votes	%	±%
Conservative	Tim Rathbone	29,261	58.4	
Alliance	David Bellotti	15,357	30.7	
Labour	Debbie Sander	4,244	8.5	
Ecology	Reginald Mutter	1,221	2.4	N/A
Majority		13,904	27.7	
Turnout		50,083	74.3	
Conservative hold		Swing		

=== Elections in the 1970s ===
General election 1979: Lewes
Party	Candidate	Votes	%	±%
Conservative	Tim Rathbone	33,992	58.42	
Liberal	G. Hook	12,279	21.10	
Labour	Tom Forrester	11,152	19.17	
National Front	B. Webb	764	1.31	N/A
Majority		21,713	37.32	
Turnout		58,187	76.32	
Conservative hold		Swing		

General election October 1974: Lewes
Party	Candidate	Votes	%	±%
Conservative	Tim Rathbone	27,588	51.87	
Liberal	G. Hook	13,741	25.84	
Labour Co-op	James Little	11,857	22.29	
Majority		13,847	26.03	
Turnout		53,186	73.81	
Conservative hold		Swing		

New constituency boundaries.

General election February 1974: Lewes
Party	Candidate	Votes	%	±%
Conservative	Tim Rathbone	30,423	52.94	
Liberal	Malcolm Holt	16,166	28.13	
Labour Co-op	James Little	10,875	18.92	
Majority		14,257	24.81	
Turnout		57,464	80.30	
Conservative hold		Swing		

General election 1970: Lewes
Party	Candidate	Votes	%	±%
Conservative	Tufton Beamish	33,592	58.34	
Labour	Quintin Barry	14,904	25.88	
Liberal	Malcolm Holt	9,083	15.77	
Majority		18,688	32.46	
Turnout		57,579	72.79	
Conservative hold		Swing		

=== Elections in the 1960s ===
General election 1966: Lewes
Party	Candidate	Votes	%	±%
Conservative	Tufton Beamish	27,529	53.44	
Labour	Roy Ellison Manley	14,561	28.32	
Liberal	Gerald Arthur Dowden	9,328	18.14	
Majority		12,968	25.12	
Turnout		51,418	76.27	
Conservative hold		Swing		

General election 1964: Lewes
Party	Candidate	Votes	%	±%
Conservative	Tufton Beamish	26,818	55.30	
Labour	Reginald Edgar Fitch	12,757	26.30	
Liberal	Gerald Arthur Dowden	8,924	18.40	N/A
Majority		14,061	29.00	
Turnout		48,499	76.43	
Conservative hold		Swing		

=== Elections in the 1950s ===
General election 1959: Lewes
Party	Candidate	Votes	%	±%
Conservative	Tufton Beamish	29,642	69.41	
Labour	William Reay	13,065	30.59	
Majority		16,577	38.82	
Turnout		42,707	75.80	
Conservative hold		Swing		

General election 1955: Lewes
Party	Candidate	Votes	%	±%
Conservative	Tufton Beamish	24,938	66.80	
Labour	John Lloyd-Eley	12,392	33.20	
Majority		12,546	33.60	
Turnout		37,330	74.83	
Conservative hold		Swing		

General election 1951: Lewes
Party	Candidate	Votes	%	±%
Conservative	Tufton Beamish	34,345	66.78	
Labour	Albert William Briggs	17,082	33.22	
Majority		17,263	33.56	
Turnout		51,478	78.26	
Conservative hold		Swing		

General election 1950: Lewes
Party	Candidate	Votes	%	±%
Conservative	Tufton Beamish	30,430	58.50	
Labour	Albert William Briggs	15,023	28.88	
Liberal	Florinda Kingdon-Ward	6,565	12.62	
Majority		15,407	29.62	
Turnout		52,018	80.99	
Conservative hold		Swing		

=== Election in the 1940s ===
General election 1945: Lewes
Party	Candidate	Votes	%	±%
Conservative	Tufton Beamish	26,176	51.26	
Labour Co-op	Albert Oram	18,511	36.25	
Liberal	Peter Cadogan	6,374	12.48	N/A
Majority		7,665	15.01	
Turnout		51,061	71.87	
Conservative hold		Swing		

=== Elections in the 1930s ===
1936 Lewes by-election
Party	Candidate	Votes	%	±%
Conservative	Tufton Percy Hamilton Beamish	14,646	65.96	
Labour	Alban Gordon	7,557	34.04	
Majority		7,089	31.92	
Turnout		22,203		
Conservative hold		Swing		

General election 1935: Lewes
Party	Candidate	Votes	%	±%
Conservative	John Loder	24,644	70.01	
Labour	Frank Rivers Hancock	10,559	29.99	
Majority		14,085	40.02	
Turnout		35,203	64.41	
Conservative hold		Swing		

General election 1931: Lewes
Party	Candidate	Votes	%	±%
Conservative	John Loder	25,181	81.29	
Labour	Frank Rivers Hancock	5,795	18.71	
Majority		19,386	62.58	
Turnout		30,976	70.87	
Conservative hold		Swing		

=== Elections in the 1920s ===
General election 1929: Lewes
Party	Candidate	Votes	%	±%
Unionist	Tufton Beamish	15,230	53.7	−19.0
Labour	Alban Gordon	7,698	27.1	−0.2
Liberal	Henry Plunket Woodgate	5,452	19.2	N/A
Majority		7,532	26.6	−18.8
Turnout		28,380	70.4	+5.7
Registered electors		40,291		
Unionist hold		Swing	−9.4	

General election 1924: Lewes
Party	Candidate	Votes	%	±%
Unionist	Tufton Beamish	13,399	72.7	+13.1
Labour	Basil Hall	5,043	27.3	−13.1
Majority		8,356	45.4	+26.2
Turnout		18,442	64.7	+6.6
Registered electors		28,517		
Unionist hold		Swing	+13.1	

1924 Lewes by-election
Party	Candidate	Votes	%	±%
Unionist	Tufton Beamish	9,584	52.0	−7.6
Labour	Basil Hall	6,112	33.2	−7.2
Liberal	Howard Williams	2,718	14.8	N/A
Majority		3,472	18.8	−0.4
Turnout		18,414	67.3	+9.2
Registered electors		27,361		
Unionist hold		Swing	−0.2	

General election 1923: Lewes
Party	Candidate	Votes	%	±%
Unionist	William Campion	9,474	59.6	−8.4
Labour	Basil Hall	6,422	40.4	+8.4
Majority		3,052	19.2	−16.8
Turnout		15,896	58.1	−6.5
Registered electors		27,361		
Unionist hold		Swing	−8.4	

General election 1922: Lewes
Party	Candidate	Votes	%	±%
Unionist	William Campion	11,345	68.0	+5.2
Labour	Hugh Millier Black	5,328	32.0	−1.6
Majority		6,017	36.0	+6.8
Turnout		16,673	64.6	+9.5
Registered electors		25,801		
Unionist hold		Swing	+3.4	

=== Elections in the 1910s ===
General election 1918: Lewes
Party		Candidate	Votes	%	±%
C	Unionist	William Campion	7,792	62.8	N/A
	Labour	Tom Pargeter	4,164	33.6	N/A
	Independent and Silver Badge	Albert Edward Gardiner	452	3.6	N/A
Majority			3,628	29.2	N/A
Turnout			12,408	55.1	N/A
Registered electors			22,500		
	Unionist hold		Swing	N/A	
C indicates candidate endorsed by the coalition government.

== Election results 1868–1918 ==
=== Elections in the 1860s ===
General election 1868: Lewes
Party	Candidate	Votes	%	±%
Liberal	Walter Pelham	601	50.6	−4.7
Conservative	William Christie	587	49.4	+4.7
Majority		14	1.2	−1.5
Turnout		1,188	88.0	+1.2
Registered electors		1,350		
Liberal hold		Swing	−4.7	

=== Elections in the 1870s ===
General election 1874: Lewes
Party	Candidate	Votes	%	±%
Conservative	William Christie	772	60.7	+11.3
Liberal	Arthur Cohen	500	39.3	−11.3
Majority		272	21.4	N/A
Turnout		1,272	89.0	+1.0
Registered electors		1,430		
Conservative gain from Liberal		Swing	+11.3	

=== Elections in the 1880s ===
General election 1880: Lewes
Party	Candidate	Votes	%	±%
Conservative	William Christie	717	55.3	−5.4
Liberal	William Codrington	580	44.7	+5.4
Majority		137	10.6	−10.8
Turnout		1,297	88.9	−0.1
Registered electors		1,459		
Conservative hold		Swing	−5.4	

General election 1885: Lewes
Party	Candidate	Votes	%	±%
Conservative	Henry Fletcher	5,312	62.5	+7.2
Liberal	William Egerton Hubbard	3,181	37.5	−7.2
Majority		2,131	25.0	+14.4
Turnout		8,493	80.2	−8.7
Registered electors		10,586		
Conservative hold		Swing	+7.2	

General election 1886: Lewes
Party	Candidate	Votes	%	±%
Conservative	Henry Fletcher	Unopposed		
Conservative hold				

=== Elections in the 1890s ===
General election 1892: Lewes
Party	Candidate	Votes	%	±%
Conservative	Henry Fletcher	5,621	70.8	N/A
Liberal	Henry Prince	2,322	29.2	New
Majority		3,299	41.6	N/A
Turnout		7,943	67.1	N/A
Registered electors		11,832		
Conservative hold		Swing	N/A	

General election 1895: Lewes
Party	Candidate	Votes	%	±%
Conservative	Henry Fletcher	Unopposed		
Conservative hold				

=== Elections in the 1900s ===
General election 1900: Lewes
Party	Candidate	Votes	%	±%
Conservative	Henry Fletcher	Unopposed		
Conservative hold				

Morison

General election 1906: Lewes
Party	Candidate	Votes	%	±%
Conservative	Henry Fletcher	7,172	56.8	N/A
Liberal	Hector Morison	5,458	43.2	New
Majority		1,714	13.6	N/A
Turnout		12,630	81.2	N/A
Registered electors		15,560		
Conservative hold		Swing	N/A	

=== Elections in the 1910s ===
General election January 1910: Lewes
Party	Candidate	Votes	%	±%
Conservative	Henry Fletcher	9,168	66.7	+9.9
Liberal	Basil Williams	4,572	33.3	−9.9
Majority		4,596	33.4	+19.8
Turnout		13,740	79.5	−1.7
Registered electors		17,277		
Conservative hold		Swing	+9.9	

1910 Lewes by-election
Party	Candidate	Votes	%	±%
Conservative	William Campion	Unopposed		
Conservative hold				

General election December 1910: Lewes
Party	Candidate	Votes	%	±%
Conservative	William Campion	Unopposed		
Conservative hold				

General Election 1914/15:

Another General Election was required to take place before the end of 1915. The political parties had been making preparations for an election to take place and by July 1914, the following candidates had been selected;

- Unionist: William Campion
- Liberal:

== Election results 1832–1868 ==
=== Elections in the 1830s ===
General election 1832: Lewes
Party	Candidate	Votes	%
Whig	Thomas Read Kemp	Unopposed	
Whig	Charles Blunt	Unopposed	
Registered electors		878	
Whig hold			
Whig hold			

General election 1835: Lewes
Party	Candidate	Votes	%
Whig	Charles Blunt	511	40.8
Whig	Thomas Read Kemp	382	30.5
Conservative	Henry FitzRoy	359	28.7
Majority		23	1.8
Turnout		715	94.0
Registered electors		761	
Whig hold			
Whig hold			

Kemp resigned, causing a by-election.

By-election, 21 April 1837: Lewes
Party	Candidate	Votes	%	±%
Conservative	Henry FitzRoy	397	51.7	+23.0
Whig	John Easthope	371	48.3	−23.0
Majority		26	3.4	N/A
Turnout		768	91.2	−2.8
Registered electors		7,842		
Conservative gain from Whig		Swing	+23.0	

General election 1837: Lewes
Party	Candidate	Votes	%	±%
Whig	Charles Blunt	413	26.6	−14.2
Conservative	Henry FitzRoy	401	25.8	+11.5
Whig	Thomas Brand	398	25.6	−4.9
Conservative	William Lyon	343	22.1	+7.8
Turnout		788	93.6	−0.4
Registered electors		842		
Majority		12	0.8	−1.0
Whig hold		Swing	−11.9	
Majority		3	0.2	N/A
Conservative gain from Whig		Swing	+10.5	

=== Elections in the 1840s ===
Blunt's death caused a by-election.

By-election, 9 March 1840: Lewes
Party	Candidate	Votes	%	±%
Conservative	George West	Unopposed		
Registered electors		881		
Conservative gain from Whig				

General election 1841: Lewes
Party	Candidate	Votes	%	±%
Radical	Summers Harford	411	25.4	N/A
Radical	Howard Elphinstone	409	25.3	N/A
Conservative	Henry FitzRoy	407	25.2	−0.6
Conservative	George West	388	24.0	+1.9
Majority		2	0.1	N/A
Turnout		810	91.9	−1.7
Registered electors		881		
Radical gain from Whig		Swing		
Radical gain from Conservative		Swing		

On petition, Harford was unseated, due to bribery and corruption, and Fitzroy was declared elected on 21 March 1842. Fitzroy was then appointed a Civil Lord of the Admiralty, requiring a by-election.

By-election, 17 February 1845: Lewes
Party	Candidate	Votes	%	±%
Conservative	Henry FitzRoy	Unopposed		
Conservative gain from Radical				

Elphinstone resigned by accepting the office of Steward of the Chiltern Hundreds, causing a by-election.

By-election, 17 March 1847: Lewes
Party	Candidate	Votes	%	±%
Whig	Robert Perfect	Unopposed		
Whig gain from Radical				

General election 1847: Lewes
Party	Candidate	Votes	%	±%
Peelite	Henry FitzRoy	457	37.8	+12.6
Whig	Robert Perfect	402	33.3	N/A
Conservative	John Bellingham Godfrey Hudson	207	17.1	N/A
Conservative	Henry Loftus	143	11.8	−12.2
Turnout		605 (est)	69.8 (est)	−22.1
Registered electors		866		
Majority		55	4.5	N/A
Peelite gain from Radical		Swing		
Majority		195	16.2	N/A
Whig gain from Radical		Swing		

=== Elections in the 1850s ===
General election 1852: Lewes
Party	Candidate	Votes	%	±%
Whig	Henry Brand	Unopposed		
Peelite	Henry FitzRoy	Unopposed		
Registered electors		713		
Whig hold				
Peelite hold				

Brand was appointed a Lord Commissioner of the Treasury, requiring a by-election.

By-election, 5 April 1855: Lewes
Party	Candidate	Votes	%	±%
Whig	Henry Brand	Unopposed		
Whig hold				

General election 1857: Lewes
Party	Candidate	Votes	%	±%
Whig	Henry Brand	Unopposed		
Peelite	Henry FitzRoy	Unopposed		
Registered electors		724		
Whig hold				
Peelite hold				

General election 1859: Lewes
Party	Candidate	Votes	%	±%
Liberal	Henry FitzRoy	339	31.8	N/A
Liberal	Henry Brand	338	31.7	N/A
Conservative	Richard Amphlett	200	18.8	N/A
Conservative	Charles Blunt	189	17.7	N/A
Majority		138	12.9	N/A
Turnout		533 (est)	76.5 (est)	N/A
Registered electors		697		
Liberal hold		Swing	N/A	
Liberal hold		Swing	N/A	

FitzRoy was appointed First Commissioner of Works, requiring a by-election.

By-election, 27 June 1859: Lewes
Party	Candidate	Votes	%	±%
Liberal	Henry FitzRoy	Unopposed		
Liberal hold				

=== Elections in the 1860s ===
FitzRoy's death caused a by-election.

By-election, 16 January 1860: Lewes
Party	Candidate	Votes	%	±%
Liberal	John Blencowe	Unopposed		
Liberal hold				

General election 1865: Lewes
Party	Candidate	Votes	%	±%
Liberal	Henry Brand	325	27.7	−4.1
Liberal	Walter Pelham	324	27.6	−4.1
Conservative	William Christie	292	24.9	+6.1
Conservative	Sir Alfred Slade, 3rd Baronet	232	19.8	+2.1
Majority		32	2.7	−10.2
Turnout		587 (est)	86.8 (est)	+10.3
Registered electors		676		
Liberal hold		Swing	−4.1	
Liberal hold		Swing	−4.1	

== Elections before 1832 ==
General election 1831: Lewes
Party	Candidate	Votes	%
Whig	Thomas Read Kemp	Unopposed	
Whig	Charles Blunt	Unopposed	
Registered electors		784	
Whig hold			
Whig gain from Tory			

General election 1830: Lewes
Party	Candidate	Votes	%	±%
Whig	Thomas Read Kemp	479	42.6	
Tory	John Shelley	372	33.1	
Whig	Alexander Donovan	274	24.4	
Turnout		626	c. 79.8	
Registered electors		c. 784		
Majority		107	9.5	
Whig hold		Swing		
Majority		98	8.7	
Tory hold		Swing		

== See also ==
- List of parliamentary constituencies in East Sussex
- List of parliamentary constituencies in the South East England (region)

== Sources ==
- The Parliamentary History of the Borough of Lewes 1295–1885
- Election result, 2005 (BBC)
- Election results, 1997–2001 (BBC)
- Election results, 1997–2001 (Election Demon)
- Election results, 1983–1992 (Election Demon)
- Election results, 1992–2005 (Guardian)
- Election results, 1951–2001 (Keele University)
- F. W. S. Craig. British Parliamentary Election Results 1950–1973. (ISBN 0-900178-07-8)
