= William Campion (governor) =

British politician (1870–1951)

Colonel Sir William Campion KCMG, DSO, TD, DL
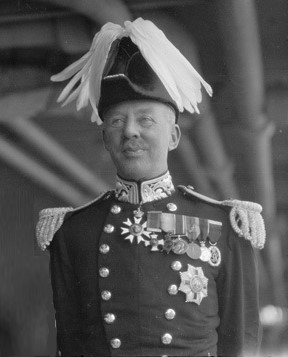
- Campion in 1924

21st Governor of Western Australia
- In office 28 October 1924 – 9 June 1931
- Monarch: George V
- Premier: Philip Collier; James Mitchell
- Preceded by: Sir Francis Newdegate
- Succeeded by: Sir James Mitchell (from 1948)

Personal details
- Born: 3 July 1870 London, England
- Died: 2 January 1951 (aged 80) Hassocks, Sussex, England
- Party: Conservative
- Spouse: Katherine Mary Byron

Military service
- Allegiance: United Kingdom
- Branch/service: British Army
- Rank: Colonel
- Unit: Royal Sussex Regiment
- Battles/wars: First World War
- Awards: Knight Commander of the Order of St Michael and St George; Distinguished Service Order; Territorial Decoration; Mentioned in Despatches

Sir William Robert Campion, KCMG, DSO, TD, DL (3 July 1870 – 2 January 1951) was a British soldier, politician, and the 21st Governor of Western Australia from 1924 to 1931.

== Early years ==
Born in London, England on 3 July 1870, Campion was educated at Eton College and the University of Oxford, and was the Conservative MP for Lewes from 1910 to 1924.

== Military career ==
Campion was commissioned into the part-time 2nd Volunteer Battalion, Royal Sussex Regiment, later 4th Battalion, Royal Sussex Regiment (of which his father was Honorary Colonel) in 1888. On the outbreak of World War I he was the battalion's senior Captain with the rank of honorary Major. He became Lieutenant-Colonel of the 1st Line battalion (1/4th Royal Sussex) and commanded it in the Gallipoli campaign. At its first action, at Suvla Bay on 9 August 1915, the Official History records that the orders given to Lt-Col Campion 'were vague in the extreme. The colonel was verbally told "to restore the line". No one knew where it was, but he was told that "if he went in that direction (pointing to a column of smoke from the burning scrub) he ought to find the 2/4th Queen's".' The 1/4th Sussex advanced steadily in extended order, found the Queen's who had been driven off the crest, and consolidated a line, having suffered heavy casualties. Campion was evacuated to England sick on 5 October.

Campion later commanded 15th (Reserve) Bn Royal Fusiliers in the UK and then went to France to command 6th (Service) Bn Bedfordshire Regiment and 17th (Garrison) Bn Royal Sussex on the Western Front before returning to the 4th Royal Sussex after its arrival from the Mediterranean in 1918. He led the battalion through the final Allied Hundred Days Offensive. He was awarded the Distinguished Service Order in 1918 and continued to command the battalion in the postwar Territorial Army.

== Governor of Western Australia ==
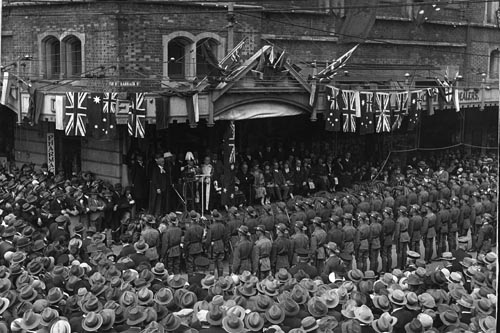
Campion (left of centre) at Western Australia's centenary celebrations in 1929.

In June 1924 Campion was appointed Governor of Western Australia. From October 1924 to June 1931 Campion worked with Labor and Nationalist premiers alike in harmony during a period without major political crises. He presided with dignity over the state's centennial celebrations in 1929.

== Later years ==
Campion returned to England in 1931 and retired to his country house in Sussex, but spoke frequently in favour of organized migration to Australia. He was a member of the Empire Settlement Committee in 1935. He accepted appointment as chairman of two Australian based gold-mining companies. He visited Australia in 1935–36 to inspect properties and again in 1939.

Campion died in Sussex on 2 January 1951, survived by his wife and four children: William Simon Campion (1895–1976) – married, with issue; Dorothy Mary Campion, Countess of Carnegie (1897–1967), married to John Carnegie, 12th Earl of Northesk with issue; Wilfred Edward Campion (1899–1972) – married with issue (divorced); Barbara Campion Willis Fleming (1903–1999) – married with issue (divorced).

Parliament of the United Kingdom
Preceded by Sir Henry Aubrey-Fletcher, 4th Baronet	Member of Parliament for Lewes; 1910–1924	Succeeded by Tufton Beamish
Government offices
Preceded by Sir Francis Newdegate	Governor of Western Australia; 1924–1931	Vacant Title next held by Sir James Mitchell
