= Thomas Read Kemp =

English property developer and politician (1782–1844)

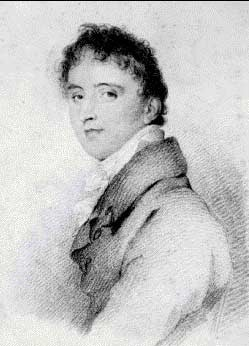

Member of Parliament for Lewes
- In office 1811–1816

Member of Parliament for Arundel
- In office 1823–1826

Member of Parliament for Lewes
- In office 1826–1837

Personal details
- Born: 23 December 1782
- Died: 20 December 1844 (aged 61) Paris, France
- Resting place: Père Lachaise Cemetery
- Children: 10
- Education: Westminster School; St John's College, Cambridge; Middle Temple

Thomas Read Kemp (23 December 1782 – 20 December 1844) was an English property developer and politician.

== Life ==
He was the son of Sussex landowner and Member of Parliament Thomas Kemp, and his wife Anne, daughter of Henry Read of Brookland. He was educated at Westminster School, and matriculated at St John's College, Cambridge in 1801. He graduated B.A. 1805, M.A. 1810. He entered the Middle Temple in 1804.

Kemp lived at Herstmonceux, then conceived and developed the Regency-style Kemp Town estate in Brighton on the south coast of England. He was Member of Parliament for Lewes 1811–16 and 1826–37 and for Arundel 1823–26.

He fled Britain in 1837 to escape his creditors and died in Paris in 1844. He is buried in Père Lachaise Cemetery. A tablet was erected to his memory at St Nicholas's Church.

== Family ==
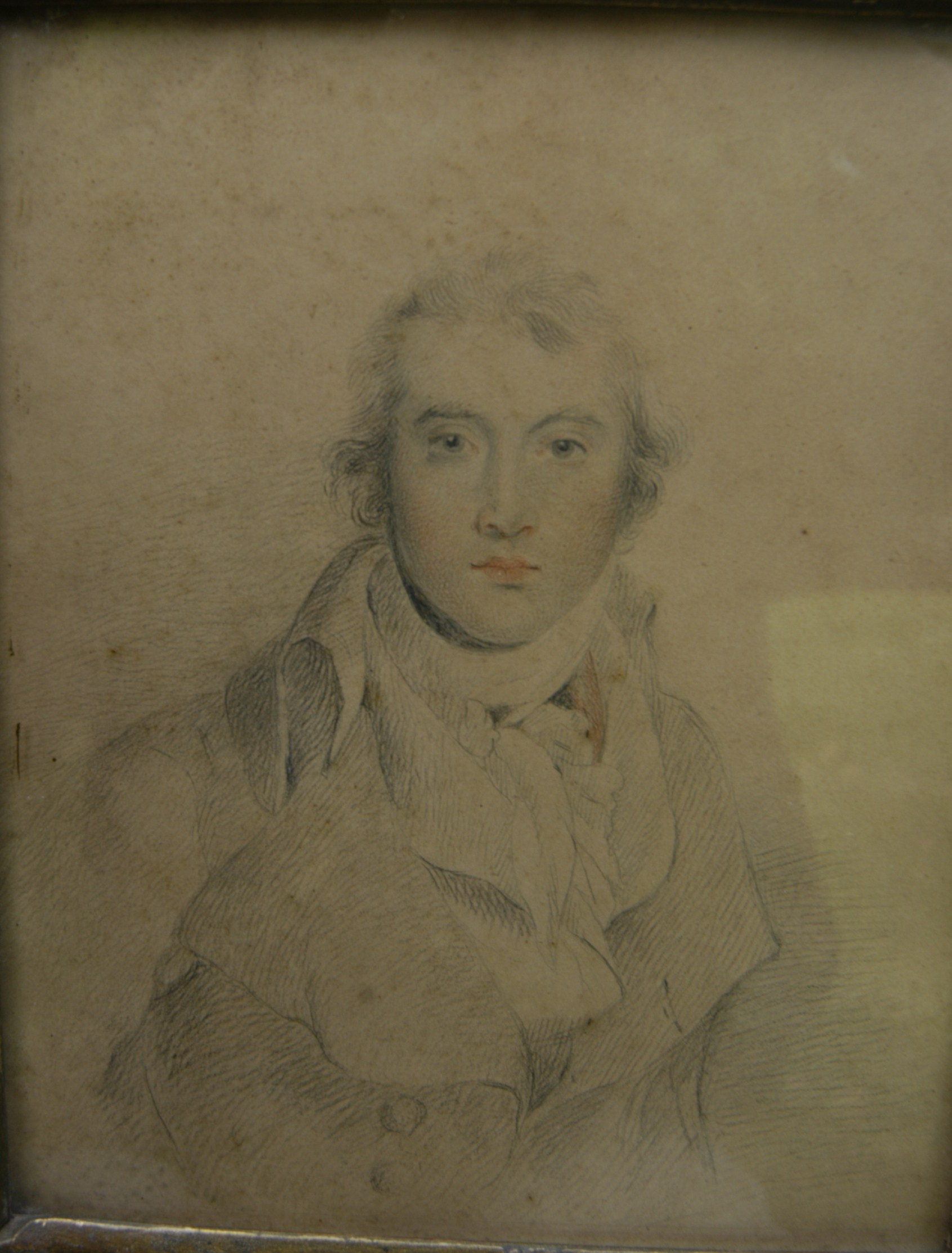
Drawing of Kemp by Sir Thomas Lawrence.

Kemp married Frances Baring, daughter of Sir Francis Baring, 1st Baronet and Harriet Herring in 1806. They had four sons and six daughters. She died during childbirth in 1825 and was buried at St. Nicholas's Church.

As second marriage in 1832, Kemp wedded Frances Shakerley of Somerford, widow of Harvey Vigors. They had one son.

== Notes ==
Parliament of the United Kingdom
Preceded by Henry Shelley; Thomas Kemp	Member of Parliament for Lewes; 1811–1816; With: Henry Shelley 1811–1812; George Shiffner 1812–1816	Succeeded by George Shiffner; Sir John Shelley, Bt
Preceded by Viscount Bury; Robert Blake	Member of Parliament for Arundel; 1823–1826; With: Viscount Bury	Succeeded by Edward Lombe; John Atkins
Preceded by Sir John Shelley, Bt; George Shiffner	Member of Parliament for Lewes; 1826–1837; With: Sir John Shelley, Bt 1826–1831; Sir Charles Blunt, Bt 1831–1837	Succeeded by Sir Charles Blunt, Bt; Henry FitzRoy
