= Sir John Shelley, 6th Baronet =

English cricketer, landowner, and Member of Parliament

Sir John Shelley, 6th Baronet (18 December 1771 – 28 March 1852) was an English landowner, Member of Parliament and amateur cricketer.

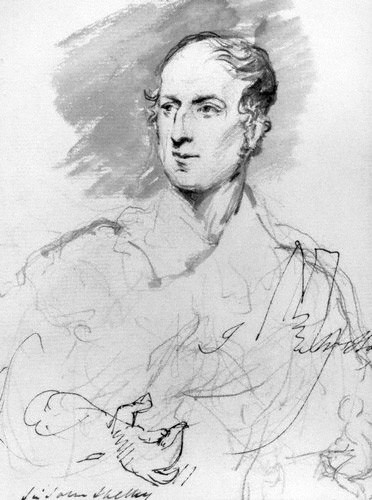
Sir John Shelley

== Career ==
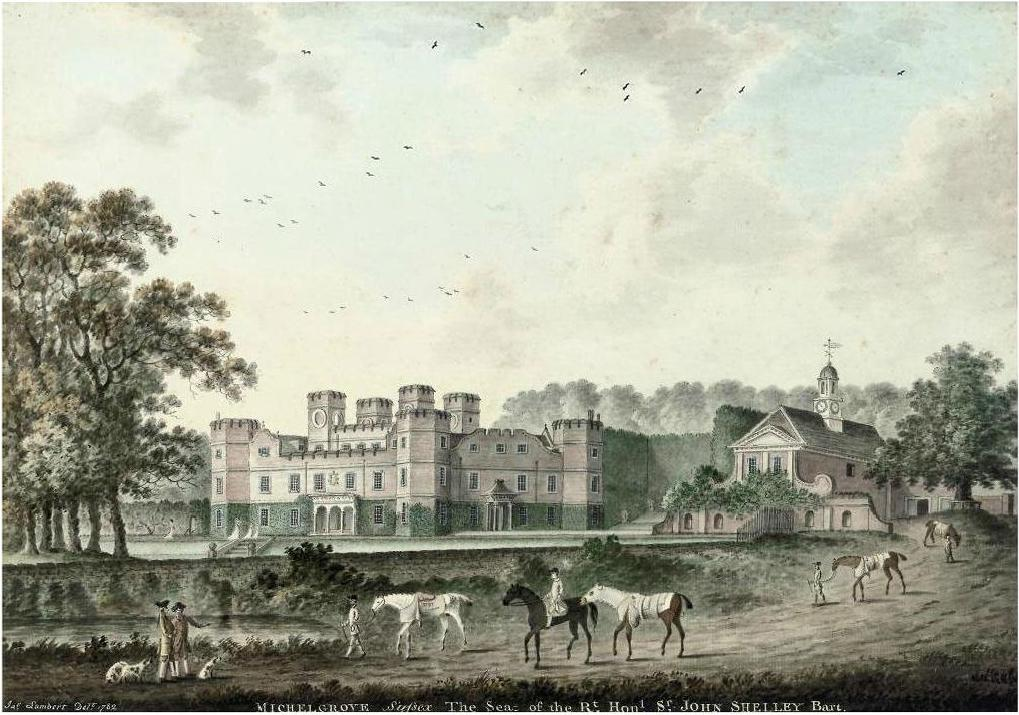
Michelgrove House, 1782

He was the son of Sir John Shelley, 5th Baronet by Wilhelmina, the daughter of John Newnham of Maresfield Park. He was educated at Winchester College, Eton College (1786–89) and Clare College, Cambridge (1789) and embarked on the Grand Tour in 1789.

Shelley became 6th baronet in September 1783 on the death of his father and inherited Michelgrove House near Patching, Sussex, which he was obliged to sell for financial reasons when he became of age. He served in the Army as an ensign in the 2nd Foot Guards in 1790, becoming a lieutenant and captain in 1793 and aide-de-camp to the Duke of Sussex. He was also a lieutenant in the Petworth yeomanry in 1797.

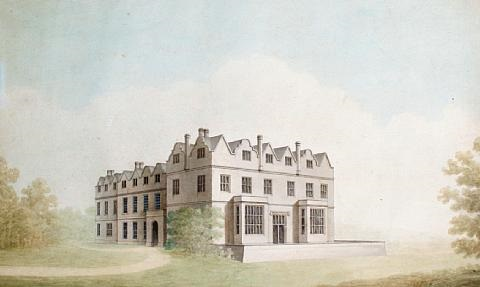
Maresfield Park c.1850

He married in 1807 Frances, the daughter and heiress of Thomas Winckley of Brockholes, Lancashire, with whom he had 4 sons and 2 daughters. He inherited Maresfield Park in Sussex in 1814 on the death of his maternal uncle.

He was also a notable breeder of Thoroughbred racehorses including The Derby winners Phantom (1811), Cedric (1824) and Priam (1830).

== Cricket career ==
He was mainly associated with Sussex and was an early member of Marylebone Cricket Club (MCC). He made 10 known appearances in important matches from 1792 to 1795.

== Family ==
He died in 1852 and was succeeded by his eldest son John. His third son Adolphus Edward Shelley was the first Auditor-General in Hong Kong. His wife, Frances Winkley, Lady Shelley (1787–1873), was a noted diarist and close friend of the Duke of Wellington.

Parliament of the United Kingdom
Preceded by Davies Giddy; Viscount Primrose	Member of Parliament for Helston; 1806; With: Viscount Primrose	Succeeded by Nicholas Vansittart; John de Ponthieu
Preceded by George Shiffner; Thomas Read Kemp	Member of Parliament for Lewes; 1816–1831; With: Sir George Shiffner, Bt 1816–1826; Thomas Read Kemp 1826–1831	Succeeded by Thomas Read Kemp; Sir Charles Blunt, Bt
Baronetage of England
Preceded by John Shelley	Baronet (of Michelgrove); 1783–1852	Succeeded by John Shelley
