= Summers Harford =

Member of Parliament for Lewes
- In office 30 June 1841 – 21 March 1842 Serving with Howard Elphinstone
- Preceded by: Henry FitzRoy; George West
- Succeeded by: Henry FitzRoy; Howard Elphinstone

Personal details
- Born: 1795
- Died: 2 June 1873 (aged 77–78)
- Party: Radical

Summers Harford (1795 – 2 June 1873) was a British Radical politician.

Harford was elected a Radical Member of Parliament for Lewes at the 1841 general election, but was the next year unseated, upon an election petition, due to bribery and corruption.

Parliament of the United Kingdom
Preceded by Henry FitzRoy; George West	Member of Parliament for Lewes; 1841–1842; With: Howard Elphinstone	Succeeded by Henry FitzRoy; Howard Elphinstone
