= John Shurley (died 1616) =

English politician

John Shurley (died October 1616), of 'The Friars', Lewes, Sussex, was an English politician.

He was a younger son of Edward Shurley (d. 1558) of Isfield, Sussex and Joan, daughter of John Fenner of Crawley. He was a fellow-commoner at Queens' College, Cambridge in 1562. He was admitted to the Middle Temple in August 1565 and was called to the bar sometime before November 1575. He became a bencher in 1587, was treasurer in 1601 and became a serjeant-at-law 1603.

He was an MP for Lewes 1572, 1589, 1597 and 1604; for Lostwithiel 1584 and was an active committee man.

He married twice, firstly Elizabeth, the daughter and coheiress of Richard Kyme of Lewes, with whom he had a daughter and secondly Frances, the daughter of Henry Capell of Hadham, Hertfordshire, with whom he had a son and 2 daughters.

He died in October 1616. His widow Frances was still alive, when his eldest son and heir John died in 1631.
