= Fitzroy House =

Building in Lewes

Coordinates: 50.874°N 0.0147°E

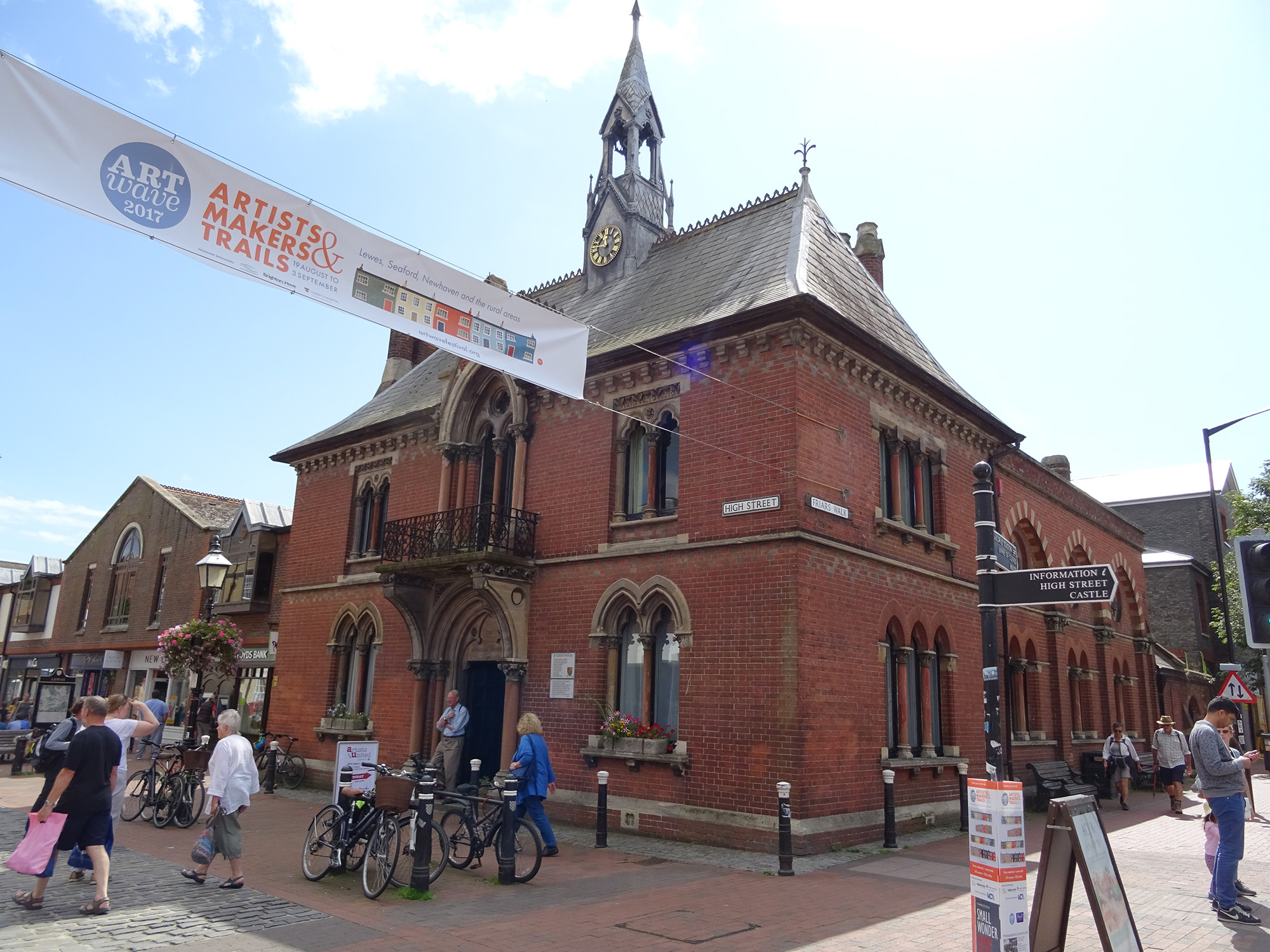
Fitzroy House in 2017.

Fitzroy House is a Victorian building on the High Street in Lewes, East Sussex, England. It was originally Fitzroy Memorial Library, designed by architect George Gilbert Scott in neo-Gothic style and built in 1862. In 1897 it became Lewes' first public library, until 1956 when it became offices. It was left empty and decaying for 20 years before being renovated and used as a family home for 40 years, as well as an occasional venue for music and theatre. In 2016 it was sold. The main focal point of the house is the double-height Octagon Room.

== History ==
Fitzroy Memorial Library was built in 1862 in memory of Henry FitzRoy. FitzRoy represented Lewes in Parliament from 1837 until his death in 1859, age 51. The building was commissioned by his widow, Hannah Meyer FitzRoy, a member of the Rothschild family, and designed by architect George Gilbert Scott.

In 1897 it was adopted by the town of Lewes as its first public library and remained so until 1956. After that time it became offices but eventually fell out of use. It was gradually left to decline until 1970, when it was decided to demolish it. Part of the building was demolished before an Emergency Protection Order and Grade II listed building status was obtained at the request of the Friends of Lewes. Unused for two decades, the property became increasingly dilapidated until it was bought by James and Maureen Franks in 1978. The couple, along with the Friends of Lewes, restored and converted the property into their home, which it remained for the next 40 years. During that time the Octagon Room was also used as a performance venue by music and theater groups. In 2016, Fitzroy House was sold by the Franks family to Alison Grant.

The building was listed at Grade II on 11 May 1970.

== Description ==
The building is in neo-Gothic style. It is described in Sussex: East with Brighton and Hove by Ian Nairn, a volume of Pevsner's Buildings of England series, as follows:

"Red brick with some decorative black brick and stone and polished marble dressings. Steep roof with prominent chimney stack and clock turret and a tall fleche. Symmetrical facade to High Street with grand gabled centrepiece, a bracketed balcony forming an entrance porch. Two tiers of windows, paired lancets below, circular above, set within a Gothic arcade of polychrome arches on pilasters with carved capitals. Inside, galleried reading room lit by an octagonal lantern [now lost]. Main staircase with Gothic balustrade."

It was described in The New York Times that "the main focal point of the house is the double-height Octagon Room. Located on the ground floor, the space, measuring 125 square meters, or 1,345 square feet, has a tiled courtyard, a galleried landing on the first floor and a glass atrium roof."
