= Richard Browne (Sussex MP) =

English politician

Richard Browne (died 1614?), of Knowle in Cranleigh, Surrey, was an English politician.

He was a younger son of Henry Browne of Betchworth Castle, Surrey.

He was a member of parliament (MP) for Steyning 1571, Arundel 1572, Lewes 1584 and 1586, Gatton 1589 and Midhurst 1601.

He served as a justice of the peace for Surrey from c. 1579 and was appointed High Sheriff of Surrey and Sussex for 1587–88.

He married twice: firstly Tabitha, the daughter of Jeffrey Lambert of Woodmansterne and secondly Catherine, the daughter and coheiress of William Harding of Knowle, and the widow of Richard Onslow, with whom he had at least 2 daughters.
