= Charles Goring, 2nd Earl of Norwich =

English peer

Arms of Goring, Earl of Norwich: Argent, a chevron between three annulets gules

Charles Goring, 2nd Earl of Norwich (1615 – 3 March 1671) was an English soldier and aristocrat, the second son of Sir George Goring. Like his father and brother, he fought for the King in the English Civil War, being colonel of a regiment of horse at the Battle of Langport in 1645. After the death of his elder brother, General Lord Goring in 1658, he was styled Lord Goring. He married Alice, relict of Thomas Baker esquire of Forest House (afterwards named Goring House), in Leyton, Essex, the eldest daughter of Robert Leman of Brightwell, Suffolk in 1659, and inherited his father's estate and titles in 1663. The 2nd Earl died without issue in 1671 and all his titles became extinct. His tomb is in the Parish Church of St Mary the Virgin, Leyton, then in the county of Essex.

Peerage of England
Preceded by George Goring	Earl of Norwich; 1663–1671	Extinct
