= William Peterson (MP) =

16th-century English politician

William Peterson (by 1517 – 3 October 1578) was an English politician.

He was a member (MP) of the parliament of England for Lewes in 1558.
