= Roger Forster (MP) =

Member of the Parliament of England

Roger Forster (fl. 1406–1407) of Lewes, Sussex, was a Member of Parliament for Lewes in 1406 and 1407.
