= John Gosselyn (MP for Weymouth) =

14th-century English politician

John Gosselyn (fl. 1384–1386) was a Member of Parliament for Weymouth, Dorset, England in November 1384 and 1386.
