= Tufton Beamish, Baron Chelwood =

British Army officer and politician (1917–1989)

The Right Honourable The Lord Chelwood MC DL
- Beamish in 1969

Member of Parliament for Lewes
- In office 5 July 1945 – 8 February 1974
- Preceded by: Tufton Percy Hamilton Beamish
- Succeeded by: Tim Rathbone

Personal details
- Born: Tufton Victor Hamilton Beamish; 27 January 1917 Dunfermline, Scotland
- Died: 6 April 1989 (aged 72) Eastbourne, England
- Party: Conservative
- Spouses: Janet McMillan Stevenson (m. 1950; div. 1973) Pia McHenry (m. 1975)
- Relations: Tufton Percy Hamilton Beamish (father)
- Children: 2 including Claudia
- Education: Royal Military College, Sandhurst

Military service
- Allegiance: United Kingdom
- Branch/service: British Army
- Years of service: 1937–1945
- Rank: Captain
- Unit: Royal Northumberland Fusiliers
- Battles/wars: Arab revolt in Palestine; World War II: Battle of France; Fall of Singapore; North African campaign; Italian campaign (World War II)
- Awards: Military Cross

Tufton Victor Hamilton Beamish, Baron Chelwood MC DL (27 January 1917 – 6 April 1989) was a British Army officer and Conservative Member of Parliament for Lewes for 29 years (1945–1974), and an author.

During the Second World War, he served in France, Belgium (1940), Malaya (1942), India and Burma (1942–43), North Africa and Italy (1943–44). In 1940 he was awarded the Military Cross; was knighted in 1961 and upon his retirement from the House of Commons was created a life peer as Baron Chelwood, of Lewes in the County of East Sussex on 7 May 1974.

== Early life and family ==
Beamish was born in Dunfermline in 1917. His father was Tufton P. H. Beamish, who served in the Royal Navy until 1922 when he retired with the rank of captain. He had followed his career in the navy by entering politics and served as the member of Parliament for Lewes from 1924 until 1931 and again from 1936 until 1945, when his son succeeded him.

Beamish was married twice: first to Janet McMillan Stevenson of New York in 1950 (dissolved in 1973), and secondly to Pia "Maria" McHenry (also a divorcee) in 1975. Lord Chelwood died from a heart attack in Eastbourne on 6 April 1989, aged 72, and was survived by his second wife (who died 7 February 2019, aged 96) and by two daughters from his first marriage.

One of his daughters, Claudia Hamilton Beamish, was elected as a Labour Member of the Scottish Parliament for South of Scotland in 2011.

== Military career ==
Beamish was educated at Stowe School and the Royal Military College, Sandhurst. He received his commission as a second lieutenant in the Royal Northumberland Fusiliers in 1937. In 1938 Beamish served in Cairo and Palestine (presumably during the Arab revolt in Palestine) and developed a lifelong interest in the Arab people of the region. After the outbreak of World War II, he was transferred to France as a company commander with the British Expeditionary Force (BEF). He was wounded on the retreat to Dunkirk and managed to secure his evacuation.

In 1941, he was transferred to the Far East and was serving in Singapore when the Japanese began their assault of the Malayan peninsula. He avoided being captured at the Fall of Singapore by taking to a rowing boat with seven other men. The men rowed to Sumatra but upon reaching their destination they found that it too had fallen to the Japanese and laid a new course for Ceylon, which they eventually reached safely. Beamish next worked as an intelligence officer in India before being transferred to the Eighth Army in North Africa in 1943, taking part in the invasion of Italy later that year. He left the army in 1945 with the rank of captain.

== Political career ==
In 1945, his father retired from politics and Beamish was chosen to replace him as the Conservative candidate for the 1945 general election. He was elected and continued to serve as the constituency Member of Parliament until he retired from the Commons at the February 1974 general election.

From 1947 to 1953, Beamish served on the executive of the 1922 Committee and, from 1965 to 1967, as opposition spokesman on defence. He remained a backbencher through his entire career and was uninterested in cabinet office. Beamish was a firm believer in the creation of European harmony through the promotion of a strong European Economic Community (serving on the Monnet Action Committee for United States of Europe, 1971–76). He was strongly opposed to the Soviet Union's domination of Eastern Europe to which he addressed himself in his 1950 book Must Night Fall?. He chaired the Conservative Foreign Affairs Committee from 1960 to 1964.

In 1970, he published a book, Half Marx, warning against the rise of the extreme left in the Labour Party. His other noted publication was Battle Royale (1965), a book on the Battle of Lewes (1264) between King Henry III and Simon de Montfort. However, he was also widely noted fort his interest in nature conservancy: he was an active member of the Royal Society for the Protection of Birds, and, from 1978, a member of the Nature Conservancy Council. He fought hard for the passing of a private member's bill that was enacted as the Protection of Birds Act 1954, and the subsequent amendments in 1964 and 1967. As a member of the House of Lords, he campaigned vigorously for the passing of the Wildlife and Countryside Act 1981. He was Deputy President of Sussex Wildlife Trust from 1967 until 1978.

Although Beamish's name inspired the Private Eye character Sir Bufton Tufton, he was not as far to the right of the Tory party as was suggested by that character, who bore a closer resemblance to the likes of Sir Gerald Nabarro, Sir Patrick Wall, Sir Marcus Fox, and the general attitudes associated with the Monday Club. Within the party, Beamish was considered a "One Nation Conservative" and as a member of the House of Lords he moved an amendment to the Community Charge ('Poll Tax') legislation to have the charge vary by income rather than being the same rate for all.

== Books ==
Beamish wrote a number of political and historical non-fiction books, reflecting his interests in Eastern Europe under communism, and his constituency of Lewes. These include:

- Must Night Fall? (1950)
- Battle Royal: a new account of Simon de Montfort's struggle against King Henry III (1965), covering the Battle of Lewes.
- Half Marx (1970)
- The Kremlin's Dilemma: the struggle for human rights in Eastern Europe (1979)

He also wrote forewords to several books, including:

- The Battle of Lewes, 1264: its place in English history (1964), a book of essays by Sir Maurice Powicke, R.F. Treharne [and] Charles H. Lemmon to commemorate the 700th anniversary of the Battle of Lewes.
- The Defenders: a history of the British volunteer (1968), by Geoffrey Cousins.

== Honours and arms ==
- Knight Bachelor - 1961
- Military Cross - 20 December 1940
- Mentioned in Despatches - 19 July 1945
- Golden Cross of Merit - 1944
- Polonia Restituta (Poland)
- Commander, Order of the Phoenix (Greece) - 1949
- Order of the Cedar (Lebanon) - 1969
- Honorary Freeman, Lewes - 1970

Coat of arms of Tufton Beamish, Baron Chelwood
Crest [On a Wreath of the Colours] a Demi-lion rampant Gules charged on the shoulder with a Trefoil slipped Or Escutcheon Argent a Lion rampant between three Trefoils slipped Gules Supporters Dexter: A Maiden proper draped around the shoulders with a Veil Argent holding in the dexter hand a Roundel Azure charged with a Martlet Or; Sinister: A Bull quarterly Gules and Argent charged with a Garland of Flowers proper Motto Virtus Insignit Audentes

== Works ==
- Lord Chelwood of Lewes. "Modest Détente but Limited Wars." Conspectus of History 1.2 (1975): 1-12.

Parliament of the United Kingdom
Preceded by Tufton Percy Hamilton Beamish	Member of Parliament for Lewes; 1945 – Feb. 1974	Succeeded by Tim Rathbone
