= Tufton Beamish (Royal Navy officer) =

English naval officer and Conservative Party politician (1874–1951)

Beamish in 1919.

Rear-Admiral Tufton Percy Hamilton Beamish, CB, DL (26 July 1874 – 2 May 1951) was an English naval officer and Conservative Party politician.

He married Margaret Simon in 1914. The couple had two daughters and one surviving son, Tufton Beamish, Baron Chelwood.

Tufton Beamish led a distinguished naval and political career. He was twice Member of Parliament (MP) for Lewes: from 1924 to 1931, and again from 1936 to 1945. His son Tufton succeeded him in at the 1945 general election and represented the seat until 1974.

Beamish's brother Henry Hamilton Beamish was a leading British antisemitic journalist and the founder of The Britons in 1919, the first organisation set up in Britain for the express purpose of diffusing antisemitic propaganda.

== Coat of Arms ==
Coat of arms of Tufton Beamish
Notes Confirmed 3 June 1921 by George Dames Burtchaell, Athlone Pursuivant and Deputy Ulster King of Arms. Crest On a wreath of the colours a demi-lion rampant Gules charged on the shoulder with a trefoil slipped Or. Escutcheon Argent a lion rampant between three trefoils slipped Gules. Motto Virtus Insignit Audentes

Parliament of the United Kingdom
Preceded by William Campion	Member of Parliament for Lewes; 1924–1931	Succeeded by John de Vere Loder
Preceded by John de Vere Loder	Member of Parliament for Lewes; 1936–1945	Succeeded by Tufton Beamish (son)
