= 1924 Lewes by-election =

UK Parliamentary by-election

The 1924 Lewes by-election was held on 9 July 1924. The by-election was held due to the appointment as Governor of Western Australia of the incumbent Conservative MP, William Campion. It was won by the Conservative candidate Tufton Beamish.

1924 Lewes by-election
Party	Candidate	Votes	%	±%
Unionist	Tufton Beamish	9,584	52.0	−7.6
Labour	Basil William Reid Hall	6,112	33.2	−7.2
Liberal	Howard Williams	2,718	14.8	New
Majority		3,472	18.8	−0.4
Turnout		18,414	67.3	+9.2
Unionist hold		Swing	-0.2	
