= Henry FitzRoy (politician) =

British politician

The Right Honourable Henry FitzRoy
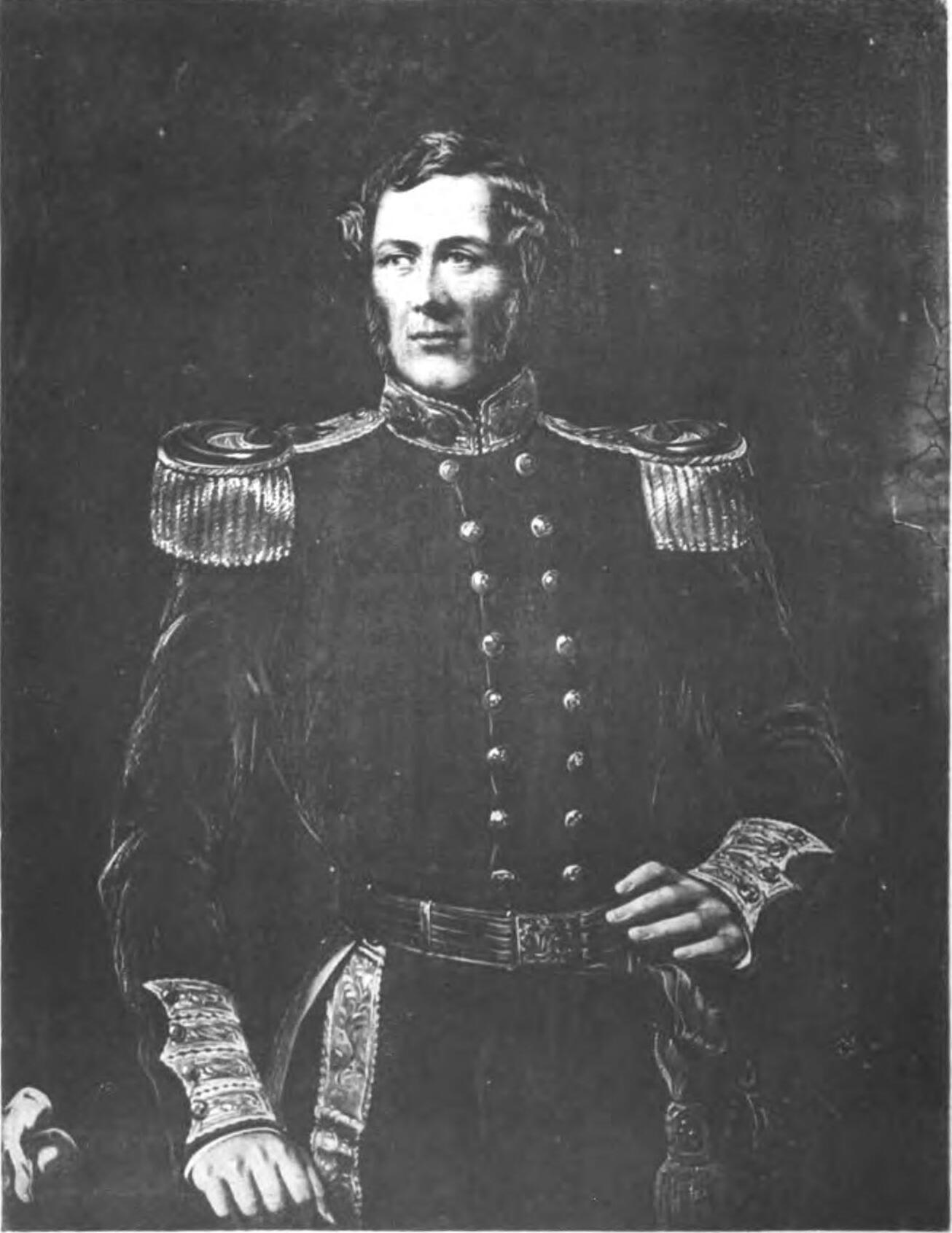

Under-Secretary of State for the Home Department
- In office 28 December 1852 – 30 January 1855
- Monarch: Victoria
- Prime Minister: The Earl of Aberdeen
- Preceded by: Sir William Jolliffe, Bt
- Succeeded by: Hon. William Cowper

First Commissioner of Works
- In office 18 June 1859 – 17 December 1859
- Monarch: Victoria
- Prime Minister: The Viscount Palmerston
- Preceded by: Lord John Manners
- Succeeded by: Hon. William Cowper

Personal details
- Born: 2 May 1807
- Died: 17 December 1859 (aged 52)
- Spouse: Hannah Rothschild (1815–1864) (m. 1839)
- Children: 2
- Parents: George FitzRoy (father); Frances Isabella Seymour (mother)
- Relatives: Charles FitzRoy (brother)

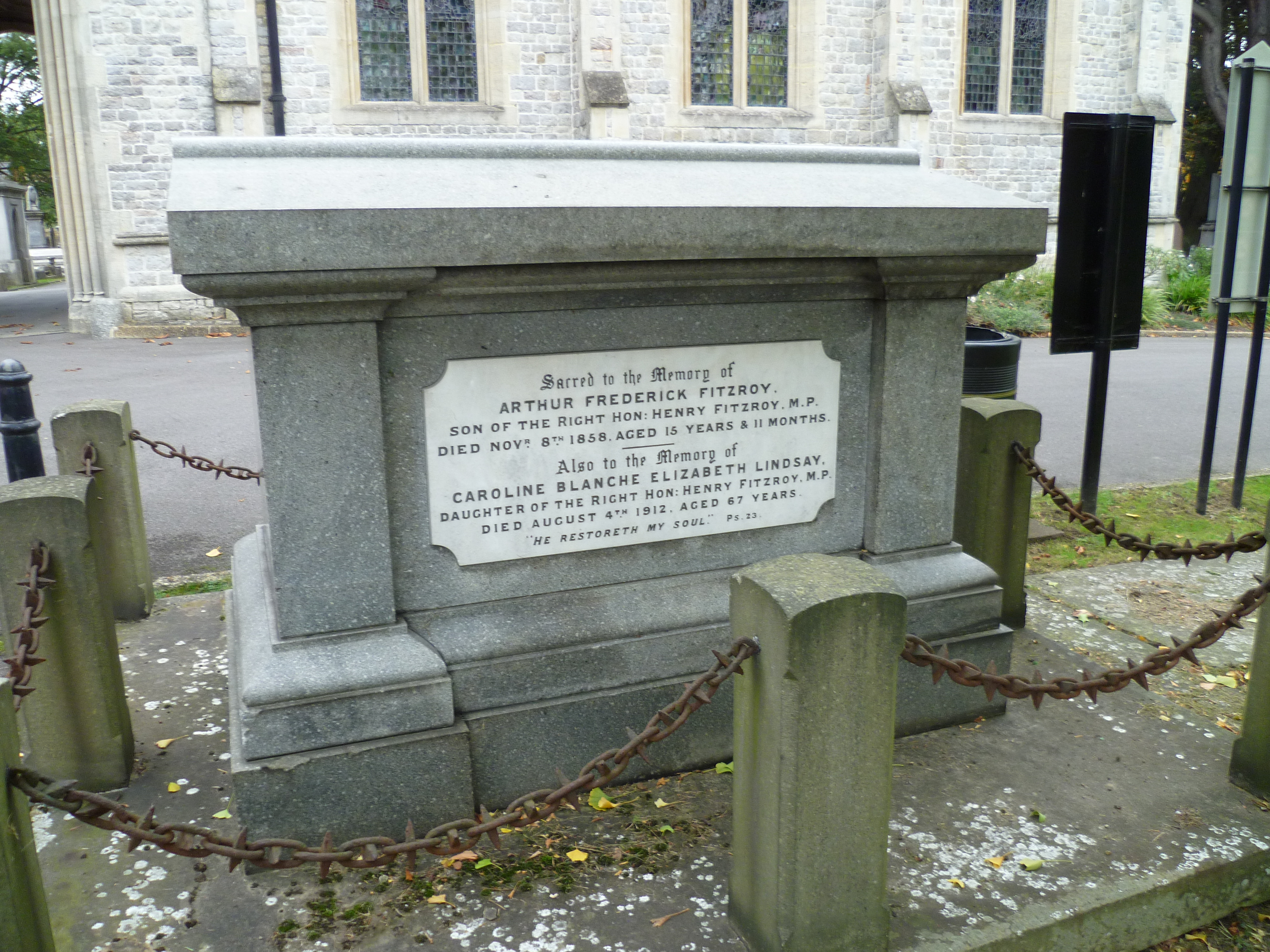
FitzRoy family grave, City of Westminster Cemetery, Hanwell

Henry FitzRoy (2 May 1807 – 17 December 1859) was a British politician of the mid-nineteenth century.

== Early life ==
Born into the family of the Dukes of Grafton, he was a great-great-great-great-grandson of King Charles II. He was second son of Lieutenant-General George FitzRoy, 2nd Baron Southampton, by his second wife Frances Isabella, daughter of Lord Robert Seymour. Charles FitzRoy, 3rd Baron Southampton, was his elder brother. His grandparents were Charles FitzRoy, 1st Baron Southampton and Anne Warren, daughter and co-heir of Adml. Sir Peter Warren and a descendant of the Schuyler family, the Van Cortlandt family, and the Delancey family, all from British North America.

== Career ==
FitzRoy was returned to Parliament for Great Grimsby in 1831, a seat he held until 1832, and later represented Lewes between 1837 and 1841 and between 1842 and 1859. He was appointed Civil Lord of the Admiralty from 1845 to 1846. He served under the Earl of Aberdeen as Under-Secretary of State for the Home Department between 1852 and 1855 and under Lord Palmerston as First Commissioner of Works between June and December 1859. In 1855 he was sworn of the Privy Council.

== Family ==
FitzRoy married Hannah, daughter of Nathan Mayer Rothschild, in 1839. They had two children, Arthur Frederic FitzRoy (1842–1858), and Caroline Blanche Elizabeth FitzRoy, who married the artist Sir Coutts Lindsay, Bt. Hannah died on 2 December 1864, aged 49.

== Death ==
FitzRoy died on 17 December 1859 and was buried at City of Westminster Cemetery, Hanwell along with his wife.

== Legacy ==
Fitzroy Memorial Library was built in 1862 in memory of FitzRoy, by his wife. In 1897 it was adopted by the town of Lewes as the first public library and remained so until 1956.

== References and sources ==
Sources

- "Fitzroy, Henry". Oxford Dictionary of National Biography (online ed.). Oxford University Press. doi:10.1093/ref:odnb/9637. (Subscription, Wikipedia Library access or UK public library membership required.)

Parliament of the United Kingdom
Preceded by George Harris; John Shelley	Member of Parliament for Great Grimsby; 1831–1832; With: Lord Loughborough	Succeeded by William Maxfield (representation reduced to one member 1832)
Preceded by Thomas Read Kemp; Sir Charles Blunt, Bt	Member of Parliament for Lewes; 1837–1841; With: Sir Charles Blunt, Bt 1837–1840; Viscount Cantelupe 1840–1841	Succeeded by Summers Harford; Howard Elphinstone
Preceded by Summers Harford; Howard Elphinstone	Member of Parliament for Lewes; 1842–1859; With: Howard Elphinstone 1842–1847; Robert Perfect 1847–1852; Henry Brand 1852–1860	Succeeded by Henry Brand; John Blencowe
Political offices
Preceded by Sir William Jolliffe, Bt	Under-Secretary of State for the Home Department; 1852–1855	Succeeded by William Cowper
Preceded by Lord John Manners	First Commissioner of Works; 1859	Succeeded by William Cowper
