= John Morley (will proven 1565) =

English politician

John Morley (by 1530 – will proven 1565) was an English politician.

He was a member (MP) of the parliament of England for Lewes in November 1554.
