= George Goring (died 1594) =

English politician

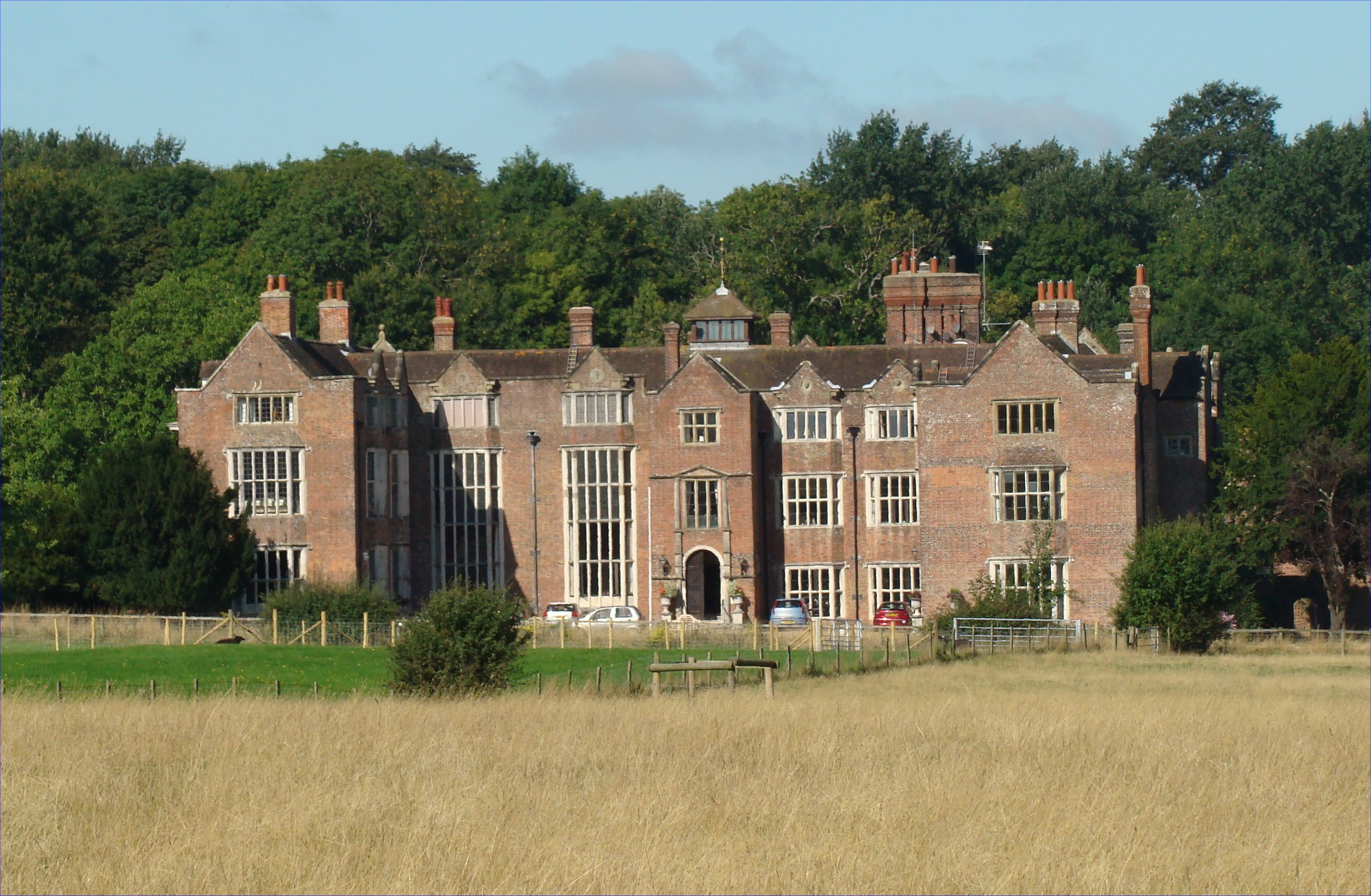
Danny House

George Goring (after 1522 – 1594) was an English politician.

He was the second son of Sir William Goring of Burton Park, Sussex.

He was appointed High Sheriff of Surrey and Sussex for 1578–79.

He was a Member of the Parliament of England (MP) for Lewes in 1559 and 1563. He was appointed receiver-general of the Court of Wards for life on 3 July 1584. He built Pelham House in Lewes and purchased a number of manors elsewhere in Sussex, including Danny Park in 1582. He lavishly extended Danny House in 1593, using funds collected in his capacity as Receiver of the Court of Wards, which were rightfully revenues of the Crown. The house is now a Grade I listed building.

He married Mary, the daughter and coheiress of William Everard, and the widow of Richard Bellingham, with whom he had 2 sons and 2 daughters. His eldest son and heir George was also MP for Lewes. His daughter Dorothy married firstly the wealthy ironmaster Sir Henry Bowyer, and secondly Sir John Shurley MP.
