= Robert Bynt =

English Member of Parliament

Robert Bynt (died before 1431) was an English Member of Parliament.

He was a Member (MP) of the Parliament of England for Lewes in 1402.
