= John Gosselyn (MP for Lewes) =

15th-century English politician

John Gosselyn was an English Member of Parliament for Lewes 1417, 1420, 1425 and 1429.
