= George Goring (died 1602) =

English politician

George Goring (died 1602), was an English politician.

He was the eldest son of George Goring of Ovingdean, Lewes, Sussex, on whose death in 1594 he inherited property, including Danny Park, and huge debts of some £20,000.

He was made a Gentleman pensioner in 1578. He was elected a Member (MP) of the Parliament of England for Lewes in 1593 and 1601.

He married Anne, the daughter of Henry Denny of Waltham Abbey, Essex; they had 5 sons and 4 daughters. His son George was created Earl of Norwich.
