= William Cantrell (MP) =

16th-century English politician

William Cantrell (died 1585), was an English politician.

He was a member (MP) of the parliament of England for Lewes in 1563.
