= William Peterson (footballer) =

English footballer

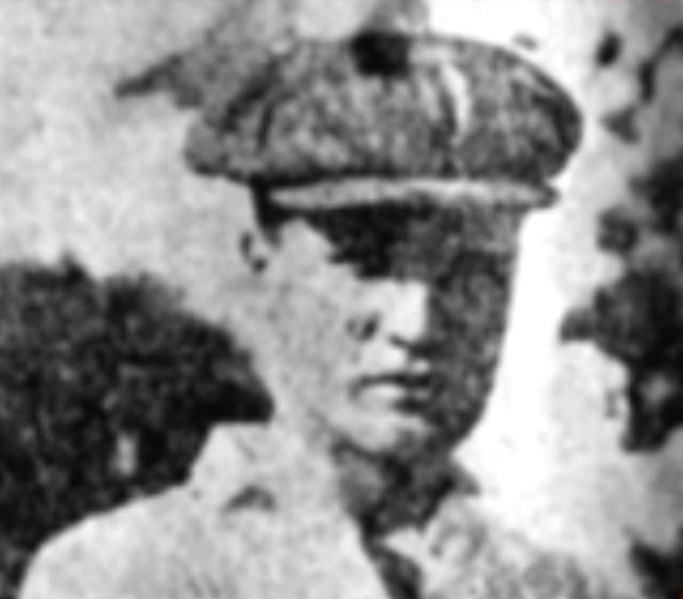

Personal information
- Date of birth: c. 1885
- Place of birth: England
- Place of death: Banfield, Buenos Aires, Argentina
- Position: Goalkeeper

Youth career
- 1905–1910: Club Atlético Banfield

Senior career*
Years	Team	Apps	(Gls)
1911–1913	Club Atlético Independiente		
- * Club domestic league appearances and goals

William Peterson (c.1885–?) was an English footballer who played as a goalkeeper for Banfield and Independiente in Argentina.

== Career ==
William Peterson was born in England and emigrated to Argentina in 1890. He settled with his family in the south of Greater Buenos Aires largely populated by members of the British community.

He began his sports career in the Club Atlético Banfield, and in 1908 he won the third division championship. In 1910, he was runner-up in the Second Division Tournament with Banfield, who faced the Racing Club de Avellaneda in the final for the promotion to the first division. Two years later, he was a player of the team Independiente de Avellaneda, playing in the 1912 championship final against Club Atlético Porteño.
