= George Goring, 1st Earl of Norwich =

English politician and army officer (1585–1663)

George Goring Earl of Norwich
- Born: 28 April 1585
- Died: 6 January 1663 (aged 77); Brentford, England
- Spouse: Mary Neville
- Children: 6
- Military career
- Allegiance: Royalists
- Conflicts: English Civil War; Battle of Maidstone; Siege of Colchester

George Goring, 1st Earl of Norwich (28 April 1585 – 6 January 1663) was an English politician and army officer who sat in the House of Commons of England between 1621 and 1628 when he was raised to the peerage.

== Biography ==
Goring was the son of George Goring of Hurstpierpoint and Ovingdean, Sussex, and his wife Anne Denny, sister of Edward Denny, 1st Earl of Norwich. He matriculated from Sidney Sussex College, Cambridge in 1600, and may subsequently have spent some time in Flanders. He was knighted in 1608, became a favourite at court and benefitted from successful overseas policy and monopolies granted by King Charles I. In 1621 he was elected Member of Parliament for Lewes. He was made Knight Marshal in 1623. He was re-elected MP for Lewes in, 1624, 1625, 1626 and 1628. In 1628 he was created Baron Goring. He became a privy councillor in 1639 and Vice-Chamberlain of the Household.

One year later the troubles between Charles and his Parliament became acute and Goring devoted his fortune freely to the royal cause; the king in November 1644 recreated for him the title which he created in 1628 for Lord Denny, Earl of Norwich, his uncle, which had just become extinct on his death. He went with Queen Henrietta Maria to the Netherlands in 1642 to raise money for the king, and in the autumn of the next year he was seeking arms and money from Cardinal Mazarin in Paris. His acts were revealed to the parliament in January 1644 by an intercepted letter to Henrietta Maria. He was consequently impeached of high treason but prudently remained abroad until 1647, albeit deprived of his lands and income, when he received a pass from parliament under a pretext of seeking reconciliation.

Arms of Goring, Earl of Norwich: Argent, a chevron between three annulets gules

Thus he was able to take a prominent part in the Second Civil War of 1648. He commanded the Kentish levies, which Fairfax dispersed at Maidstone and elsewhere and was forced to surrender unconditionally at Colchester. Norwich's refusal to surrender, even after the cause was known to be hopeless and the people of the town begged him to surrender, was considered to be against the rules of war. Two of his commanders were executed after the siege for their part in it. Norwich was condemned to exile in November 1648 by a vote of the House of Commons, but the next month the vote was annulled.

Early in the next year a court formed under John Bradshaw and tried: Norwich, the Duke of Hamilton, Lord Capel, the Earl of Holland and Sir John Owen. Each received a death sentence on 6 March 1649, but petitions for mercy were presented to parliament, and Norwich's life was spared by the Speaker's casting vote. Shortly after his liberation from prison in May 1649, he joined the exiled court of Charles II who employed him in fruitless negotiations with the duke of Lorraine. He became captain of the king's guard at the Restoration, and in consideration of the fortune he had spent or income he had foregone in the king's service a pension of 2000 pounds per year was granted him.

Norwich died at Brentford on 6 January 1663.

== Children ==
By his wife Mary Nevill (died 1648), daughter of Edward Nevill, 8th Baron Bergavenny and Rachel Lennard, he had four daughters and two sons: George, Lord Goring; and Charles, who fought in the Civil War, succeeded his father in the earldom, and died without heirs in March 1671.

- Lady Elizabeth Goring (d. c. Nov. 1687), who married William Brereton, 2nd Baron Brereton
- Lady Catherine Goring, who married Edward Scott (d. 1663), son of Edward Scott (d. 1646) of Scot's Hall by his 1st wife, Alice Stringer, and had several children whose paternity her husband refused to acknowledge, on the grounds of her notorious infidelity (Prince Rupert was said to be one of her lovers); her son Thomas succeeded to the estates after Edward belatedly acknowledged him as his lawful son. Thomas married in 1663 Caroline Carteret, daughter of Sir George Carteret, 1st Baronet.
- Lady Lucy Goring, who married Sir Drue Deane
- Lady Diana Goring, who married firstly Thomas Covert of Slaugham, Sussex, and secondly George Porter, eldest son of the noted courtier Endymion Porter
- George Goring, Lord Goring (14 Jul 1608 – 25 Jul 1657)
- Charles Goring, 2nd Earl of Norwich (c. 1615 – 3 Mar 1671)

Parliament of England
Preceded by Christopher Neville; Richard Amhurst	Member of Parliament for Lewes; 1621–1628; With: Richard Amhurst 1621; Christopher Neville 1624; Sir George Rivers 1625–1626; Anthony Stapley 1628	Succeeded by Anthony Stapley; Jerome Weston
Honorary titles
Preceded by Sir Thomas Jermyn	Vice-Chamberlain of the Household; 1639–1644	Vacant English Interregnum
Preceded by The Earl of Morton	Captain of the Yeomen of the Guard; 1644–1649	Vacant English Interregnum
Vacant English Interregnum	Captain of the Yeomen of the Guard; 1660–1662	Succeeded by The Viscount Grandison
Peerage of England
New creation	Earl of Norwich; 1644–1663	Succeeded by Charles Goring
New creation	Baron Goring; 1628–1663	Succeeded by Charles Goring
