= Walterus Nyng =

English Member of Parliament

Walterus Nyng (fl. 1304/5), was an English Member of Parliament.

He was a Member (MP) of the Parliament of England for Lewes in 1304/5.
