= Robertus le Bynt =

English Member of Parliament

Robertus le Bynt was an English Member of Parliament.

He was a Member (MP) of the Parliament of England for Lewes in 1307.
