= Simon Tring =

Former English Member of Parliament (MP)

Simon Tring, was an English Member of Parliament (MP).

He was a Member of the Parliament of England for Lewes in 1309, 1311 and 1313.
