= Galfridus de Wolvehope =

Member of the Parliament of England

Galfridus de Wolvehope (fl. 1304–1313) was an English Member of Parliament.

He was a Member (MP) of the Parliament of England for Lewes in 1304/5 and July 1313.
