= Giles Wodefold =

English politician

Giles Wodefold (fl. 1446–1447) was an English politician.

He was a member (MP) of the parliament of England for Lewes in 1442 and February 1449.
