= Gervasius de Wolvehope =

English Member of Parliament

Gervasius de Wolvehope (fl. 1295–1302) was an English Member of Parliament (MP).

He was a Member of the Parliament of England for Lewes in 1295, 1298 and 1302.
