= List of MPs elected to the English parliament in 1593 =

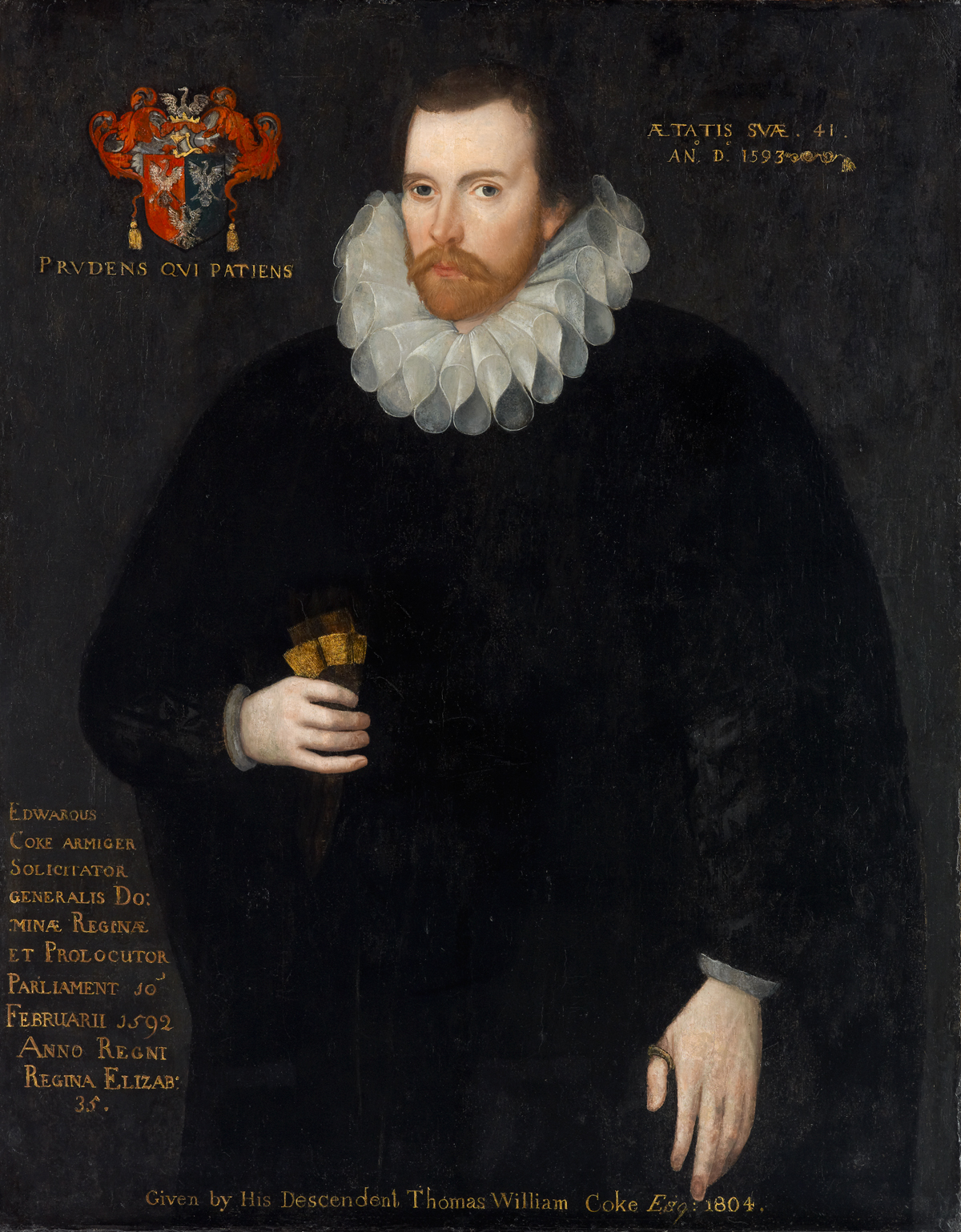
Edward Coke, Speaker

This is a list of members of Parliament (MPs) elected to the 8th Parliament of Elizabeth I of England in 1593, the 35th year of her reign. The speaker was Edward Coke, the solicitor-general and member of Parliament (MP) for Norfolk.

The Parliament met on 18 February 1593 and lasted until 10 April 1593 when it was dissolved.

== List of constituencies and members ==
=== Bedfordshire ===
Constituency	Members	Notes
Bedfordshire	Hon. Oliver St John; George Rotheram	
Bedford	John Pigott; Humphrey Winch	
=== Berkshire ===
Constituency	Members	Notes
Berkshire	Sir Henry Unton; Humphrey Forster	
Windsor	Henry Neville; Edward Neville	
Reading	Humphrey Donatt; Charles Wednester	
Wallingford	Thomas Fortescue; Owen Oglethorpe	
Abingdon	William Braunche	
=== Buckinghamshire ===
Constituency	Members	Notes
Buckinghamshire	Sir John Fortescue; Sir Robert Dormer	
Buckingham	John Carey, 3rd Baron Hunsdon; Francis Fortescue	
Wycombe	Thomas Tasburgh; Thomas Fortescue	
Aylesbury	Sir Thomas West; John Lyly	
=== Cambridgeshire ===
Constituency	Members	Notes
Cambridgeshire	Sir John Cotton; John Peyton	
Cambridge	Thomas Goldsborough; Christopher Hoddesdon	
=== Cheshire ===
Constituency	Members	Notes
Cheshire	Sir Thomas Holcroft; John Done	
City of Chester	Richard Birkheved; Gilbert Gerard	
=== Cornwall ===
Constituency	Members	Notes
Cornwall	Peter Edgcumbe; Sir William Bevil	
Launceston	Roland Watson; George Grenville	
Liskeard	George Wray; Jonathan Trelawny	
Lostwithiel	Francis Godolphin; Robert Beale	
Truro	John Parker; Nicholas Smith	
Bodmin	Anthony Bennet; Richard Connock	
Helston	William Gardiner; Ralph Knevitt	
Saltash	George Carew; Jerome Horsey	
Westlow	Robert Crosse; Hugh Beeston	Crosse sat for Yarmouth, IoW and was replaced 1593 by John Shelbery
Grampound	Richard Edgecumbe; Edward Jones	
Eastlow	William Hampden; Gregory Downhall	
Camelford	Humphrey Mitchell; Richard Leech	
Penryn	John Osborne; Edward Philips	
Tregony	John Snow; Arnold Oldsworth	
St Ives	Noel Sotherton; Nicholas Saunders	
Mitchel	Sir Walter Raleigh; Richard Reynell	
Bossiney	Thomas Harris; John Hender	
Fowey	William Killigrew; Samuel Lennard	
St Germans	Sampson Lennard; John Glanville	
St Mawes	Nicholas Fuller; Henry Vincent	
Newport	Richard Stephens; Emanuel Chamond	
Callington	Robert Carey, 1st Earl of Monmouth; Carew Reynell	
=== Cumberland ===
Constituency	Members	Notes
Cumberland	Nicholas Curwen; Wilfred Lawson	
Carlisle	Henry Scrope; Edward Aglionby	
=== Derbyshire ===
Constituency	Members	Notes
Derbyshire	George Manners; Henry Cavendish	
Derby	Robert Stringer; William Botham	
=== Devon ===
Constituency	Members	Notes
Devon	Sir Thomas Denys; Sir Edward Seymour, 1st Baronet	
Exeter	John Hele; John Peryam	
Totnes	Richard Sparry; Christopher Savery	
Barnstaple	George Chittinge; Richard Leye	
Plymouth	Sir Francis Drake; Robert Basset	
Plympton Erle	Edwin Sandys; Richard Southcote	
Tavistock	Hugh Vaughan; Richard Codrington	
Bere Alston	Charles Blount; Thomas Burgoyne	
Clifton Dartmouth Hardness	Nicholas Hayman; Hugh Holland	
=== Dorset ===
Constituency	Members	Notes
Dorset	Thomas Hussey; Arthur Gorges	
Dorchester	Francis James; Thomas Dabridgecourt	
Poole	James Orrenge; Edward Man	
Shaftesbury	Arthur Atye; Michael Hicks	
Weymouth and Melcombe Regis	William Weston; Thomas Stafford; Arthur Messenger; Thomas Stevens	
Lyme Regis	Zachariah Bethel; Robert Hassard	
Wareham	Thomas Rogers |George Strode	
Bridport	Christopher Lambert; John Fortescue	
Corfe Castle	William Tate; Francis Flower	
=== Essex ===
Constituency	Members	Notes
Essex	Sir Thomas Heneage; Richard Warren (MP)	
Colchester	James Morice; Martin Bessell	
Maldon	Sir Thomas Mildmay, Bt; Edward Lewknor (died 1605)	
=== Gloucestershire ===
Constituency	Members	Notes
Gloucestershire	Henry Poole; John Pointz	
Gloucester	Thomas Atkins; Richard Birde	
Cirencester	Oliver St John; Henry Ferrers	
=== Hampshire ===
Constituency	Members	Notes
Hampshire	Sir George Carey; Benjamin Tichborne	
Winchester	Edward Stafford; Thomas Fleming	
Southampton	Sir Thomas Wilkes; Thomas Heton	
Portsmouth	Edward Radclyffe, 6th Earl of Sussex; Thomas Thorney	
Petersfield	Sir Walter Covert; Richard Weston	
Yarmouth	Robert Dillington; Robert Crosse	
Newport	William Cotton; Richard Huyshe	
Newtown	Thomas Dudley; Richard Browne	
Lymington	Richard Blount; John Knight	
Christchurch	John Herbert; John Agmondesham	
Stockbridge	John Awdeley; Henry St John	
Whitchurch	Robert West; Richard Theakston	
Andover	Miles Sandys; Edward Barker	
=== Herefordshire ===
Constituency	Members	Notes
Herefordshire	Thomas Coningsby; Herbert Croft	
Hereford	Gregory Price; Thomas Mallard	
Leominster	Francis Vere; Richard Coningsby	
=== Hertfordshire ===
Constituency	Members	Notes
Hertfordshire	Sir Robert Cecil; Sir Henry Cocke	
St Albans	Henry Maynard; Humphrey Coningsby	
=== Huntingdonshire ===
Constituency	Members	Notes
Huntingdonshire	Edward Wingfield; Oliver Cromwell	
Huntingdon	Robert Lee; Robert Cromwell	
=== Kent ===
Constituency	Members	Notes
Kent	Sir Edward Hoby; Moyle Finch	
Canterbury	Richard Lee; Henry Finch	
Rochester	William Lewin; George Chowne	
Queenborough	John Brooke alias Cobham; John Baynham	
Maidstone	Sir Thomas Fludd; Lewen Buffkyn	
=== Lancashire ===
Constituency	Members	Notes
Lancashire	Sir Richard Molyneux; Thomas Gerard, 1st Baron Gerard	
Preston	James Dalton; Thomas Bulbeck	
Lancaster	John Preston; John Awdeley	
Newton	Edmund Trafford; Robert Langton	
Wigan	William Gerard; Michael Heneage	
Clitheroe	William Twysden; John Chamberlain	
Liverpool	Michael Doughty; John Wroth	
=== Leicestershire ===
Constituency	Members	Notes
Leicestershire	Francis Hastings; Thomas Skeffington	
Leicester	John Stanford I James Clarke	
=== Lincolnshire ===
Constituency	Members	Notes
Lincolnshire	Sir Edward Dymoke; George St Paul	
Lincoln	George Anton; Charles Dymoke	
Boston	Anthony Irby; Richard Stevenson	
Grimsby	William Barne; Nicholas Saunderson	
Stamford	Sir Robert Wingfield; Richard Shute	
Grantham	Thomas Horsman; Francis Neale	
=== Middlesex ===
Constituency	Members	Notes
Middlesex	Sir Robert Wroth; Francis Bacon	
Westminster	Richard Cecil; Thomas Cole	
City of London	Sir John Hart; Edward Drew; Andrew Palmer; George Southerton	
=== Monmouthshire ===
Constituency	Members	Notes
Monmouthshire	William Herbert; Edward Kemeys	
Monmouth Boroughs	Edward Hubberd	
=== Norfolk ===
Constituency	Members	Notes
Norfolk	Edward Coke; Nathaniel Bacon	
Norwich	Robert Houghton; Robert Yarham	
King's Lynn	Sir John Peyton; William Lewis	
Yarmouth	Thomas Damet; John Felton	
Thetford	Charles Chewte; Bassingbourne Gawdy	
Castle Rising	John Townshend; Henry Spelman	
=== Northamptonshire ===
Constituency	Members	Notes
Northamptonshire	Thomas Cecil, 1st Earl of Exeter; Christopher Yelverton	
Peterborough	Sir Thomas Reede; William Hacke	
Northampton	Valentine Knightley; Peter Wentworth	
Brackley	Richard Bowle; Sidney Montagu	
Higham Ferrers	Henry Montagu	
=== Northumberland ===
Constituency	Members	Notes
Northumberland	Sir William Reade alias Kynnerd; Robert Widdrington	
Newcastle	Henry Anderson; Henry Mitford	
Morpeth	Robert Carey, 1st Earl of Monmouth; Francis Tyndale	Carey sat for Callington, replaced by Edmund Bowyer
Berwick upon Tweed	William Morton; William Selby	
=== Nottinghamshire ===
Constituency	Members	Notes
Nottinghamshire	Sir Charles Cavendish; Philip Strelley	
Nottingham	Richard Parkins; Humphrey Bonner	
East Retford	Roger Portington; Anthony Cooke	
=== Oxfordshire ===
Constituency	Members	Notes
Oxfordshire	Sir Francis Knollys; Sir William Knollys	
Oxford	Sir Edmund Carey; George Calfield	
Woodstock	Lawrence Tanfield; John Lee	
Banbury	Anthony Cope	
=== Rutland ===
Constituency	Members	Notes
Rutland	Sir John Harington (Sir) Andrew Noel	
=== Salop ===
Constituency	Members	Notes
Shropshire	Francis Newport; Sir Robert Needham	
Shrewsbury	Reginald Scriven; Robert Wright	
Bridgnorth	Edward Bromley; John Lutwich	
Ludlow	Robert Berry; Thomas Canland	
Wenlock	William Baynham; Sir John Poole	
Bishops Castle	Francis Beavans; Alexander King	
=== Somerset ===
Constituency	Members	Notes
Somerset	Francis Hastings; Edward Dyer	
Bristol	Thomas Hanham; Richard Cole	
Bath	William Sharestone; William Price	
Wells	Richard Godwyn; James Godwyn	
Taunton	William Aubrey; John Davidge	
Bridgwater	Robert Bocking; William Thomas	
Minehead	Richard Hanbury; James Quirke	
=== Staffordshire ===
Constituency	Members	Notes
Staffordshire	Walter Harcourt; Christopher Blount	
Lichfield	Sir John Wingfield; Richard Broughton	
Stafford	Henry Bourchier; Francis Cradock	
Newcastle under Lyme	John James; Thomas Fitzherbert	
Tamworth	John Ferrers; Thomas Smith	
=== Suffolk ===
Constituency	Members	Notes
Suffolk	Edward Bacon; Sir Clement Heigham	
Ipswich	Robert Barker; Zachariah Lok	
Dunwich	Henry Savile; Thomas Corbet	
Orford	Edward Grimston; John North	
Eye	Edward Honing; Philip Gawdy	
Aldeburgh	Thomas Knyvet; William Bence	
Sudbury	William Fortescue; Dudley Fortescue	
=== Surrey ===
Constituency	Members	Notes
Surrey	(Sir) George More; John Wolley	
Southwark	Hugh Browker; Richard Hutton	
Bletchingly	Julius Caesar; Stephen Riddlesden	
Reigate	Sir Edward Howard; Sir John Trevor	
Gatton	William Lane; George Buck	
Guildford	George More; Laurence Stoughton	
Haslemere	Adrian Stoughton; Nicholas Saunders	
=== Sussex ===
Constituency	Members	Notes
Sussex	Robert Sackville, 2nd Earl of Dorset; Thomas Shirley	
Chichester	Richard Lewnor; William Ashby	
Horsham	John Hare; Richard Franke	
Midhurst	John Boys; Thomas Churcher	
Lewes	Henry Glenham; George Goring	
New Shoreham	William Necton; Herbert Morley	
Steyning	Sir Walter Waller; Thomas Shirley	
Bramber	Samuel Thornhill; Edward Mitchelborne	
East Grinstead	Reade Stafford; John Shurley	
Arundel	Thomas Fanshawe; Richard Baker	
=== Warwickshire ===
Constituency	Members	Notes
Warwickshire	Fulke Greville; Edward Greville	
Coventry	Thomas Saunders; John Myles	
Warwick	John Hugford; William Combe	
=== Westmorland ===
Constituency	Members	Notes
Westmoreland	Sir William Bowes; Edward Denny	
Appleby	Thomas Posthumous Hoby; Cuthbert Reynolds	
=== Wiltshire ===
Constituency	Members	Notes
Wiltshire	Sir Walter Long; Sir William Brounker	
Salisbury	Giles Hutchens; Robert Bower	
Wilton	Thomas Morgan; Robert Penruddock	
Downton	John Goldwell; Thomas Willoughby	
Hindon	Francis Zouche; Abraham Hartwell	
Heytesbury	Sir John Thynne; Thomas Thynne	
Chippenham	Edward Maria Wingfield; Francis Harvey	
Calne	Henry Jackman; Thomas Edwards	
Devizes	Henry Baynton; Richard Mompesson	
Ludgershall	Edward Thornborough; Chidiock Wardour	
Great Bedwyn	Thomas Hungerford; James Kirton	
Cricklade	Henry Noel; John Pleydell	
Malmesbury	Sir Henry Knyvet; Thomas Lake	
Westbury	William Jordyn; Henry Fanshawe	
Old Sarum	Sir Anthony Ashley; Edmund Fortescue	
Wootton Bassett	John Hungerford; William Meredith	
Marlborough	Richard Wheler; Anthony Hungerford	
=== Worcestershire ===
Constituency	Members	Notes
Worcestershire	Sir Henry Bromley; William Walsh	
Worcester	Walter Jones; Rowland Berkeley	
Droitwich	Robert Walter; George Wylde I	
=== Yorkshire ===
Constituency	Members	Notes
Yorkshire	Sir George Savile; John Aske	
York	Andrew Trewe; James Birkby	
Kingston upon Hull	Leonard Willan; Peter Proby	
Scarborough	Edward Gates; Roger Dalton	
Knaresborough	Samuel Foxe; Simon Willis	
Richmond	Sir Talbot Bowes; John Pepper	
Beverley	John Mansfield; Edward Alford	
Aldborough	Andrew Fisher; Edward Hancock	
Thirsk	Sir John Dawney; Sir Henry Belasyse, 1st Baronet	
Hedon	Henry Brooke alias Cobham II; Christopher Hilliard	
Ripon	Anthony Wingfield; William Bennet	
Boroughbridge	John Brograve; Vincent Skinner	
=== Cinque Ports ===
Constituency	Members	Notes
Hastings	Richard Lyffe; Henry Apsley	
Sandwich	Peter Manwood; Edward Peake	
Dover	Thomas Fane; Thomas Elwood	
Romney	John Mynge; Robert Bawle	
Hythe	Henry Fane; John Collins	
Rye	Henry Gaymer; Robert Carpenter	
Winchelsea	Adam Ashburnham; Ashburnham Pecke	
=== Wales ===
Constituency	Members	Notes
Anglesey	William Glynne	
Beaumaris	Thomas Bulkeley	Bulkeley died 1593. Possibly the MP was his relative Thomas Bulkeley.
Brecknockshire	Sir Robert Knollys	
Brecknock	Sir Matthew Morgan	
Carnarvon	Robert Griffith	
Carnarvonshire	William Maurice	
Cardiganshire	Richard Pryse	
Cardigan	Sir Ferdinando Gorges	
Carmarthenshire	Walter Vaughan	
Carmarthen	Thomas Baskerville	
Denbighshire	Roger Puleston	
Denbigh Boroughs	Simon Thelwall	
Flintshire	Thomas Hanmer	
Flint	Thomas Griffith	
Glamorgan	Sir Robert Sidney	
Cardiff	David Roberts	
Merioneth	Griffith Nanney	
Montgomeryshire	Reginald Williams	
Montgomery	Richard Morgan	
Pembrokeshire	Sir Thomas Perrot	
Pembroke	Sir Conyers Clifford	
Haverford West	Sir Nicholas Clifford	
Radnorshire	James Price	
Radnor	Thomas Crompton	

== See also ==
- List of MPs elected to the English parliament in 1597
- The Golden Speech
