= List of MPs elected to the English parliament in 1597 =

This is a list of members of Parliament (MPs) elected to the 9th Parliament of Elizabeth I in 1597, the 39th year of her reign: the Parliament met on 24 October 1597 and was held to 9 February 1598 when it was dissolved.

== List of constituencies and members ==
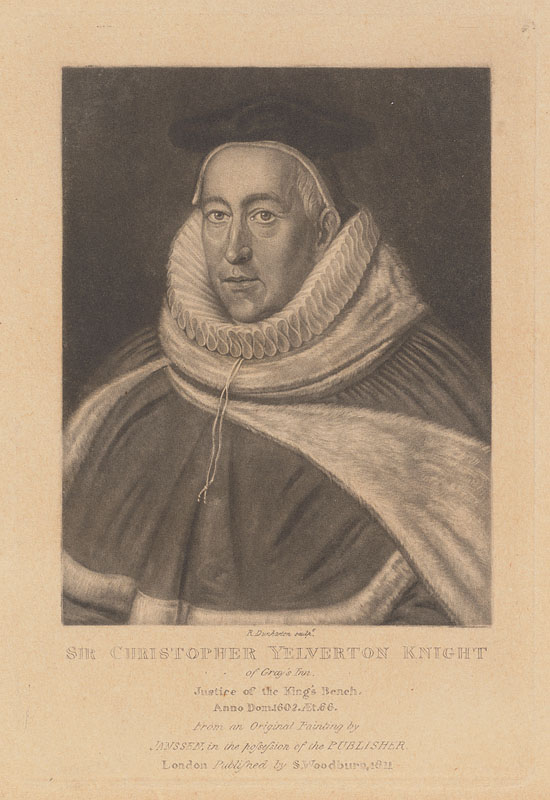
Sir Christopher Yelverton, Speaker

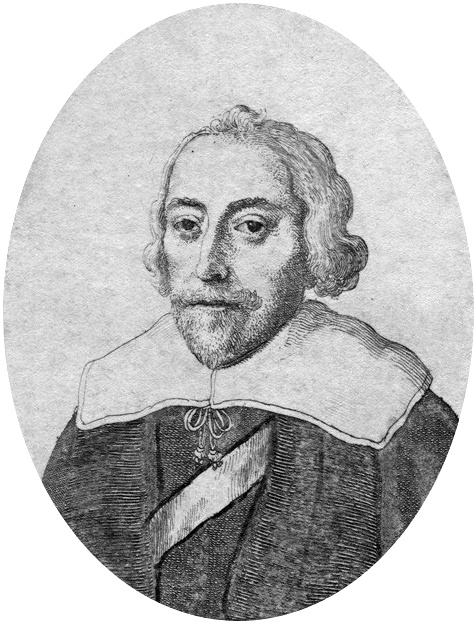
Oliver St John, Bedfordshire

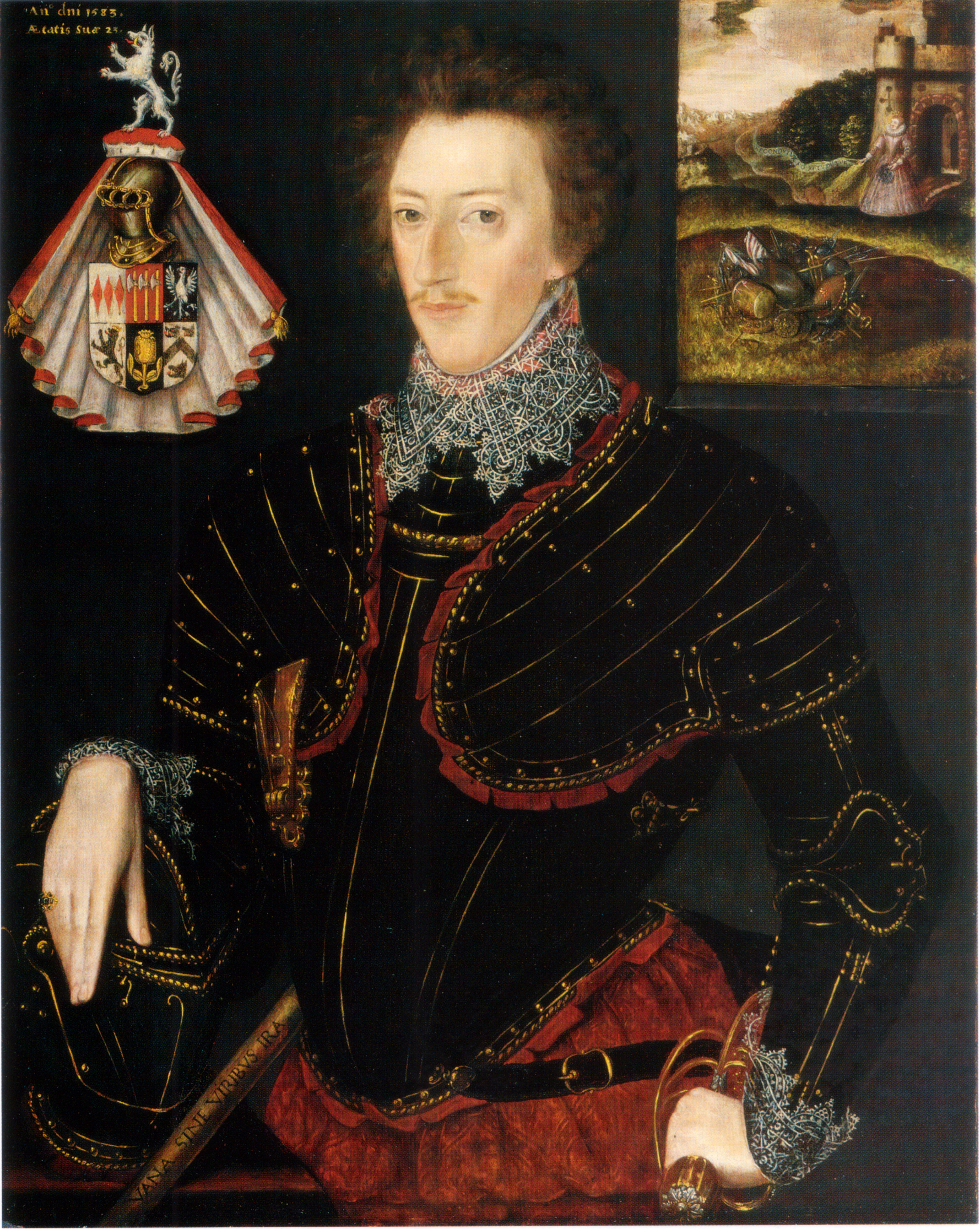
Sir Edward Hoby, Rochester

=== Bedfordshire ===
| Constituency | Members | Notes |
| Bedfordshire | Hon. Oliver St John; Sir Edward Radclyffe | |
| Bedford | Humphrey Winche; Oliver Luke | |
=== Berkshire ===
| Constituency | Members | Notes |
| Berkshire | Sir Henry Norreys; Francis Knollys | |
| Windsor | Julius Caesar; John Norreys | |
| Reading | Francis Moore; Sir Humphrey Forster | |
| Wallingford | Thomas Fortescue; Owen Oglethorpe | |
| Abingdon | Francis Little | |
=== Buckinghamshire ===
| Constituency | Members | Notes |
| Buckinghamshire | Sir John Fortescue; Francis Goodwin | |
| Buckingham | Edward Carey; Francis Fortescue | |
| Wycombe | William Fortescue; John Tasburgh | |
| Aylesbury | Thomas Tasburgh; Thomas Smythe | |
=== Cambridgeshire ===
| Constituency | Members | Notes |
| Cambridgeshire | Sir Henry North; William Hynde | |
| Cambridge | Robert Wallis; John Yaxley | |
=== Cheshire ===
| Constituency | Members | Notes |
| Cheshire | Sir William Brereton; Thomas Egerton | |
| City of Chester | Peter Warburton; William Brock | |
=== Cornwall ===
| Constituency | Members | Notes |
| Cornwall | William Killigrew; Jonathan Trelawny | |
| Launceston | Herbert Croft ? | |
| Liskeard | Henry Neville; Edward Trelawny | |
| Lostwithiel | William Cornwallis; John Cooke | |
| Truro | Maurice Berkeley; Reade Stafford | |
| Bodmin | Sir Bernard Grenville; John Herbert | |
| Helston | William Cooke; Nicholas Saunders | |
| Saltash | Gregory Downhall; Ellis Wynn | |
| Westlow | Robert Hitcham; Sir Henry Lennard | |
| Grampound | John Leigh; Robert Newdigate | |
| Eastlow | Ambrose Bellot; Robert Gawdy | |
| Camelford | Jerome Horsey; Henry Carnesewe | |
| Penryn | James Killegrew; Edward Jones | |
| Tregoney | Sir Edward Denny; Henry Birde | |
| St Ives | Noel Sotherton; Vincent Skinner | |
| Mitchel | John Arundell; John Carew | |
| Bossiney | Thomas Harris; Sir Edward Denny | |
| Fowey | John Rashleigh; Thomas Treffry | |
| St Germans | Robert Hatchman; John Chamberlain | |
| St Mawes | Michael Vyvyan; Richard Orver | |
| Newport | Morgan Coleman; Edward Lewknor | |
| Callington | Henry Ferrers; John Egerton | |
=== Cumberland ===
| Constituency | Members | Notes |
| Cumberland | Joseph Pennington (MP); Christopher Pickering | |
| Carlisle | Henry Scrope; Thomas Sandford | |
=== Derbyshire ===
| Constituency | Members | Notes |
| Derbyshire | Thomas Gresley; John Harpur | |
| Derby | Henry Duport; Robert Stringer | |
=== Devon ===
| Constituency | Members | Notes |
| Devon | William Strode; Amias Bampfield | |
| Exeter | John Hele; William Martin | |
| Totnes | Edward Giles; Christopher Buggin | |
| Barnstaple | Thomas Hinson; George Peard | |
| Plymouth | Warwick Hele; William Stallenger | |
| Plympton Erle | George Southcote; Edward Hancock | |
| Tavistock | Edward Montagu; Valentine Knightley | |
| Bere Alston | Sir Jocelyn Blount; George Crooke | |
| Clifton Dartmouth Hardness | John Osborne; William Bastard | |
=== Dorset ===
| Constituency | Members | Notes |
| Dorset | Sir Ralph Horsey; Sir Walter Raleigh | |
| Dorchester | Robert Ashley; Richard Wright | |
| Poole | Roger Mawdeley; Edward Man | |
| Shaftesbury | John Budden; John Davies | |
| Weymouth | Richard Swayne; Francis Leigh | |
| Melcombe Regis | John Mockett; John Brooke | |
| Lyme Regis | Richard Tichborne; Christopher Ellesdon | |
| Wareham | John Frankland; Sampson Hussey | |
| Bridport | Lewison Fitzjames; Adrian Gilbert | |
| Corfe Castle | ? ? | |
=== Essex ===
| Constituency | Members | Notes |
| Essex | William Petre; John Wentworth | |
| Colchester | Robert Barker; Richard Symnell | |
| Maldon | Thomas Harris; William Wiseman | |
=== Gloucestershire ===
| Constituency | Members | Notes |
| Gloucestershire | John Tracy; Sir John Hungerford | |
| Gloucester | Luke Garnons; William Oldsworth | |
| Cirencester | Henry Poole; James Wroughton | |
=== Hampshire ===
| Constituency | Members | Notes |
| Hampshire | Thomas Fleming; Richard Mill | |
| Winchester | William Badger; John Moore | |
| Southampton | William Wallop; Francis Bacon | Bacon sat for Ipswich, replaced by Sir Oliver Lambert |
| Portsmouth | William Greene; Thomas Thorney | |
| Petersfield | Wiliam Kingswell; Thomas Hanbury | |
| Yarmouth | Benedict Barnham; John Snow | |
| Newport | Richard James; William Cotton | |
| Newtown | Sylvanus Scory; Thomas Crompton | |
| Lymington | Thomas West; Henry Wallop | |
| Christchurch | Simon Willis; Andrew Rogers | |
| Stockbridge | Miles Sandys; Mark Steward | |
| Whitchurch | Thomas Henshaw; Richard Carey | |
| Andover | Edward Reynolds; Edward Phelips | |
=== Herefordshire ===
| Constituency | Members | Notes |
| Herefordshire | Sir Thomas Coningsby; Sir John Scudamore | |
| Hereford | Gregory Price; Anthony Pembridge | |
| Leominster | Thomas Crompton; John Creswell | |
=== Hertfordshire ===
| Constituency | Members | Notes |
| Hertfordshire | Sir Robert Cecil; Rowland Lytton | |
| St Albans | Henry Maynard; Humphrey Coningsby | |
=== Huntingdonshire ===
| Constituency | Members | Notes |
| Huntingdonshire | Sir Gervase Clifton; Oliver Cromwell | |
| Huntingdon | Richard Cromwell; Robert Cooke | |
=== Kent ===
| Constituency | Members | Notes |
| Kent | Sir Robert Sidney; Sir William Brooke | Brooke killed in duel, 1597 and replaced in 1598 by Percival Hart |
| Canterbury | John Boys; Sir Henry Finch | |
| Rochester | Sir Edward Hoby (Sir) Thomas Walsingham (elder) | |
| Queenborough | Sir George Carew; Michael Sondes | |
| Maidstone | Sir Thomas Fludde; Sir John Leveson | |
=== Lancashire ===
| Constituency | Members | Notes |
| Lancashire | Thomas Gerard; Robert Hesketh | |
| Preston | John Brograve; Sir John Stanhope | |
| Lancaster | Sir Thomas Hesketh; Edward Hubberd | |
| Newton | William Cope; Geoffrey Osbaldeston | |
| Wigan | Edward Legh; Nicholas Smyth | |
| Clitheroe | William Holte; George Rotheram | |
| Liverpool | Thomas Gerard; Peter Probie | |
=== Leicestershire ===
| Constituency | Members | Notes |
| Leicestershire | Sir Edward Hastings; Sir Francis Hastings | |
| Leicester | George Parkins; John Stanford | |
=== Lincolnshire ===
| Constituency | Members | Notes |
| Lincolnshire | Thomas Monson; William Pelham | |
| Lincoln | Thomas Grantham; George Anton | |
| Boston | Anthony Irby; Richard Stevenson | |
| Grimsby | Thomas Hatcliffe; Thomas Ellis | |
| Stamford | Sir Robert Wingfield; Thomas Balgaye | |
| Grantham | Thomas Horsman; Francis Neale | |
=== Middlesex ===
| Constituency | Members | Notes |
| Middlesex | Sir Robert Wroth; John Peyton | |
| Westminster | Thomas Knyvet; Thomas Cole | Cole died - replaced by Anthony Mildmay |
| City of London | Sir John Hart; John Croke; Thomas Fettiplace; George Southerton | |
=== Monmouthshire ===
| Constituency | Members | Notes |
| Monmouthshire | Henry Herbert; John Arnold | |
| Monmouth Boroughs | Sir Robert Johnson | |
=== Norfolk ===
| Constituency | Members | Notes |
| Norfolk | Henry Gawdy; Sir John Townshend | |
| Norwich | Christopher Layer; Thomas Sotherton | |
| King's Lynn | Thomas Oxborough; Nathaniel Bacon | |
| Yarmouth | Henry Hobart; John Felton | |
| Thetford | John Crofts; Philip Gawdy | |
| Castle Rising | Thomas Guybon; Henry Spelman | |
=== Northamptonshire ===
| Constituency | Members | Notes |
| Northamptonshire | Sir Thomas Cecil; Sir Richard Knightley | |
| Peterborough | John Wingfield; Alexander Neville | |
| Northampton | Christopher Yelverton; Henry Yelverton | Christopher Yelverton was Speaker |
| Brackley | Robert Spencer; Ranulph Crewe | |
| Higham Ferrers | Henry Montagu | |
=== Northumberland ===
| Constituency | Members | Notes |
| Northumberland | Sir Robert Carey; William Selby | |
| Newcastle | Henry Chapman; Henry Lindley | |
| Morpeth | Robert Printis; Thomas Carleton | |
| Berwick upon Tweed | William Selby; Thomas Parkinson | |
=== Nottinghamshire ===
| Constituency | Members | Notes |
| Nottinghamshire | John Byron; Sir Richard Whalley | |
| Nottingham | Humphrey Bonner; Anchor Jackson | |
| East Retford | Roger Portington; John Roos | |
=== Oxfordshire ===
| Constituency | Members | Notes |
| Oxfordshire | Sir William Knollys; Sir Richard Wenman | |
| Oxford | Anthony Bacon; George Calfield | |
| Woodstock | Lawrence Tanfield; John Lee | |
| Banbury | Anthony Cope | |
=== Rutland ===
| Constituency | Members | Notes |
| Rutland | William Cecil; Sir James Harington | |
=== Salop ===
| Constituency | Members | Notes |
| Shropshire | Sir Henry Bromley; Thomas Leighton | |
| Shrewsbury | Reginald Scriven; Roger Owen | |
| Bridgnorth | Edward Bromley; John Lutwich | |
| Ludlow | Hugh Sanford; Thomas Canland | Sanford's election declared void - replaced by Robert Berry |
| Wenlock | William Baynham; William Lacon | Baynham died - replaced by Thomas Fanshawe |
| Bishops Castle | Hayward Townsend; Edmund Baynham | |
=== Somerset ===
| Constituency | Members | Notes |
| Somerset | Sir Francis Popham; Sir Hugh Portman | |
| Bristol | George Snigge; Thomas James | |
| Bath | William Sharestone; William Heath | |
| Wells | Leonard Crosse; William Watkins | |
| Taunton | Edward Barker; Edward Hexte | |
| Bridgwater | Alexander Jones; Alexander Popham | |
| Minehead | Amias Bampfield; Conrad Prowse | Bampfield chose to sit for Devon - replaced by ? |
=== Staffordshire ===
| Constituency | Members | Notes |
| Staffordshire | Hon. John Dudley; Sir Christopher Blount | |
| Lichfield | Joseph Oldsworth; William Fowkes | |
| Stafford | Sir Edward Stafford; Henry Bourchier | |
| Newcastle under Lyme | Sir Walter Leveson; John Bowyer | |
| Tamworth | William Temple; George Hyde | |
=== Suffolk ===
| Constituency | Members | Notes |
| Suffolk | Sir Thomas Waldegrave; Henry Warner | |
| Ipswich | Sir Michael Stanhope; Francis Bacon | |
| Dunwich | Arthur Atye; Clipsby Gawdy | |
| Orford | Thomas Rivett; William Forthe | |
| Eye | Edward Honing; Anthony Gawdy | |
| Aldeburgh | Francis Harvey; Francis Johnson | |
| Sudbury | George Waldegrave; John Clapham | |
=== Surrey ===
| Constituency | Members | Notes |
| Surrey | Lord Howard of Effingham; George More | Howard replaced 1598 by Hon. Charles Howard as the former may have mistakenly supposed that in acquiring the courtesy title Lord Howard of Effingham he was disqualified |
| Southwark | Edmund Bowyer; Richard Hutton | |
| Bletchingly | Hon. Charles Howard; Sir John Trevor | Howard sat for Surrey and was replaced by Sir Richard Trevor |
| Reigate | Sir William Howard; Sir Edward Howard | |
| Gatton | George Buc; Michael Hicks | |
| Guildford | Sir William More; Sir Robert Southwell | |
| Haslemere | Francis Aungier; George Austen | |
=== Sussex ===
| Constituency | Members | Notes |
| Sussex | Robert Sackville; Nicholas Parker | |
| Chichester | Richard Lewknor; Adrian Stoughton | |
| Horsham | John Hare; James Booth | |
| Midhurst | Lewis Lewknor; James Smyth | |
| Lewes | Sir Henry Glemham; John Shirley | |
| New Shoreham | William Nector; John Young | |
| Steyning | John Shurley; Thomas Shirley | |
| Bramber | Nicholas Trott; William Comber | |
| East Grinstead | George Rivers; Richard Baker | |
| Arundel | William Essex; James Smith | |
=== Warwickshire ===
| Constituency | Members | Notes |
| Warwickshire | Fulke Greville; William Combe | |
| Coventry | Henry Kervyn; Thomas Saunders | |
| Warwick | John Townsend; William Spicer | |
=== Westmorland ===
| Constituency | Members | Notes |
| Westmoreland | Walter Harcourt; Henry Cholmley | |
| Appleby | James Colbrand; John Lyly | |
=== Wiltshire ===
| Constituency | Members | Notes |
| Wiltshire | Sir William Eyre; Henry Baynton | |
| Salisbury | Thomas Eyre; Giles Hutchens | |
| Wilton | Thomas Muffet; Robert Penruddock | |
| Downton | Robert Turner; George Powell | |
| Hindon | Sir James Marvyn; Henry Jackman | |
| Heytesbury | Sir John Thynne; Lawrence Hyde | |
| Chippenham | Thomas Edmondes; Sharington Talbot | Edmondes replaced by Edward Wymarke |
| Calne | Thomas Edwards; Richard Lowe | |
| Devizes | John Kent; Robert Drew | |
| Ludgershall | Edmund Ludlow; Richard Leake | |
| Great Bedwyn | Sir Anthony Hungerford; Francis Castilian | |
| Cricklade | Sir George Gifford; Grey Brydges, 5th Baron Chandos | |
| Malmesbury | Sir Henry Knyvet; Thomas Estcourt | |
| Westbury | Matthew Ley; James Ley | |
| Old Sarum | William Blaker; Nicholas Hyde | |
| Wootton Bassett | Henry Dacre; John Lowe | |
| Marlborough | Richard Digges; Richard Wheler | |
=== Worcestershire ===
| Constituency | Members | Notes |
| Worcestershire | John Lyttelton; Edmund Colles | |
| Worcester | Rowland Berkeley; William Bagnall | |
| Droitwich | John Acton; Thomas Baily | |
=== Yorkshire ===
| Constituency | Members | Notes |
| Yorkshire | Sir John Stanhope; Sir Thomas Posthumous Hoby | Both replaced by John Savile, 1st Baron Savile of Pontefract and Sir William Fairfax |
| York | James Birkby; Thomas Moseley | |
| Kingston upon Hull | Leonard Willan; Anthony Cole | |
| Scarborough | Sir Thomas Posthumous Hoby; Walter Pye | |
| Knaresborough | Hugh Beeston; Sir William Slingsby | |
| Richmond | Marmaduke Wyvill; Cuthbert Pepper | |
| Beverley | Thomas Crompton; Edward Fraunceys | |
| Aldborough | Henry Bellasis; Richard Gargrave | |
| Thirsk | George Leycester; Thomas Belasyse | |
| Hedon | Thomas Salveyn; Sir Christopher Hilliard | |
| Ripon | Sir John Bennet; Christopher Perkins | |
| Boroughbridge | Henry Fanshawe; Thomas Crompton | |
=== Cinque Ports ===
| Constituency | Members | Notes |
| Hastings | Edmund Pelham; Richard Liffe | |
| Sandwich | Peter Manwood; Edward Peake | |
| Dover | Thomas Fane; William Leonard | |
| Romney | George Coppyn; James Thurbarne | |
| Hythe | Christopher Honywood; Christopher Toldervey | |
| Rye | Sampson Lennard; Thomas Hamon | |
| Winchelsea | Ralph Ewens; Thomas Colepeper | |
=== Wales ===
| Constituency | Members | Notes |
| Anglesey | Hugh Hughs | |
| Beaumaris | William Jones | |
| Brecknockshire | Sir Robert Knollys | |
| Brecknock | David Williams | |
| Cardiganshire | Thomas Pryse | |
| Cardigan | Thomas Rawlins | |
| Carmarthenshire | Walter Vaughan | |
| Carmarthen | Henry Vaughan | |
| Carnarvonshire | William Griffith | |
| Carnarvon | John Owen | |
| Denbighshire | John Lloyd | |
| Denbigh Boroughs | John Panton | |
| Flintshire | William Ravenscroft | |
| Flint | Edward Morgan | |
| Glamorgan | Sir Thomas Mansell | |
| Cardiff | Nicholas Hawkins | |
| Merioneth | Thomas Myddelton | |
| Montgomeryshire | William Herbert | |
| Montgomery | Thomas Jukes | |
| Pembrokeshire | Sir Gelly Meyrick | |
| Pembroke | Edward Burton | |
| Haverford West | Sir James Perrot | |
| Radnorshire | James Price | |
| Radnor | Edward Lewis | |
