= Maurice Berkeley (died 1617) =

English politician (c.1576–1617)

Maurice Berkeley (c. 1576 – 1617) of Bruton Abbey in the parish of Bruton, Somerset, was an English landowner and gentleman who as a Member of Parliament sat in the House of Commons at various times between 1597 and 1614.

== Origins ==
Maurice Berkeley was the eldest son and heir of Sir Henry Berkeley (d.1601) of Bruton, by his wife Margaret Lygon (d.1616) (herself a great-granddaughter of Maurice, Lord Berkeley), the widow of Sir Thomas Russell (d. 1574) of Strensham in Worcestershire, and a daughter of William Lygon, Esquire, (d.1567) of Madresfield Court in Worcestershire, by his wife Eleanor Dennis. He had two brothers of the whole blood, Henry Berkeley, MP for Ilchester, and Edward Berkeley, and a half-brother (by his mother's first marriage to Sir Thomas Russell), Thomas Russell (1570-1634) of Strensham, who married firstly Katherine Bampfield (d. before 1599) and secondly, Anne St. Leger, widow of Thomas Digges. Russell in 1616 was overseer of the will of William Shakespeare.

== Career ==
On 13 February 1590, Berkeley matriculated at Queen's College, Oxford, at the age of thirteen, together with his eleven-year-old brother, Henry. His half-brother, Thomas Russell, was also at Queen's College at the time, in his second year. Berkeley graduated BA on 14 February 1593, and was admitted to the Middle Temple in 1594.

In the 1590s, acrimonious conflicts between Sir Henry Berkeley's father and Henry Herbert, 2nd Earl of Pembroke, required the intervention of the Queen and the Star Chamber; however, Maurice Berkeley appears to have managed to remain uninvolved in his father's long-standing quarrels with Pembroke.

Berkeley was with Essex in the expedition to Cádiz in 1596, and in January 1598 was to have accompanied his cousin, Sir Robert Cecil, to France, although it is unclear whether he did travel to the continent at that time. In August of that year he requested a military appointment. In 1601, he succeeded his father.

In 1597, Berkeley was elected a Member of Parliament for Truro. He was elected as one of the members for Somerset in 1601 and for Minehead in 1604. In 1614 he was re-elected as a knight of the shire for Somerset.

== Marriage and issue ==
Berkeley married Elizabeth Killigrew, the eldest daughter of Sir William Killigrew (died 1622) of Hanworth, Middlesex, of an ancient Cornish family, a courtier to Queen Elizabeth I and to King James I, whom he served as Groom of the Privy Chamber. Sir William Killigrew and his brother Henry Killigrew made their fortunes at the court of Queen Elizabeth I. William Killigrew was a diplomatic courier, a Groom of the Privy Chamber by 1576, and Treasurer of the Chamber in 1595. He held various offices in Cornwall and Devon, was a Member of Parliament, was knighted by King James I at Theobalds on 7 May 1603, and in 1605-8 was Chamberlain of the Exchequer. By Elizabeth Killigrew, Maurice Berkeley had five sons and two daughters:

- Charles Berkeley, 2nd Viscount Fitzhardinge, eldest son and heir
- Henry Berkeley
- Maurice Berkeley
- Sir William Berkeley
- John Berkeley, 1st Baron Berkeley of Stratton, whose title referred to his role at the Battle of Stratton, Cornwall, in 1643 at which the Royalists destroyed Parliament's field army in Devon and Cornwall.
- Margaret Berkeley
- Jane Berkeley

== Death ==
Sir Maurice Berkeley's mother died in the winter of 1616, leaving him her household goods at Bruton and the wedding ring 'which I had of his father, my late husband, Sir Henry Barkley, knight', and leaving his half-brother, Thomas Russell, a basin and ewer of silver 'which was his father's, Sir Thomas Russell, deceased'. Berkeley survived his mother by only a few months. He made his will on 26 April 1617, and died on 11 May, purportedly ‘far indebted’. He left Bruton to his eldest son, Charles. His son William Berkeley was later Governor of Virginia.

== Footnotes ==
Parliament of England
Preceded by John Parker; Nicholas Smyth	Member of Parliament for Truro; 1597; With: Reade Stafford	Succeeded by William Daniel; Thomas Harris
Preceded by Sir Francis Popham; Sir Hugh Portman	Member of Parliament for Somerset; 1601; With: (Sir) Edward Phelips	Succeeded by Sir Francis Hastings (Sir) Edward Phelips
Preceded by Dr Francis James; Lewis Lashbrooke	Member of Parliament for Minehead; 1604; With: Sir Ambrose Turville	Succeeded by No return made
Preceded by (Sir) Edward Phelips; John Poulett	Member of Parliament for Somerset; 1614	Succeeded by Charles Berkley; Robert Hopton
