= Sparry =

Sparry is a surname. Notable people with the surname include:

- Franz Sparry (1715–1767), composer
- Richard Sparry, English politician
