= William Hampden =

William Hampden may refer to:

- William Hampden (1633–1675), English politician
- William Hampden (1570–1597), English politician

== See also ==
- William Hampden Dutton (1807–1849), Australian pastoralist
- William Hampden Sage (1859–1922), American military officer
