= Thomas Fitzherbert (disambiguation) =

Thomas Fitzherbert was an English Jesuit.

Thomas Fitzherbert may also refer to:

- Thomas Fitzherbert (MP for Newcastle-under-Lyme), represented Newcastle-under-Lyme in 1593
- Thomas Fitzherbert (MP for Staffordshire), represented Staffordshire in 1545–7
- Thomas Fitzherbert (Arundel MP) for Arundel 1780–1790
- Thomas Fitzherbert (cricketer) (1869–1937), English cricketer
