= William Arnold (master mason) =

English master mason (1595–1637)

William Arnold (fl. 1595–1637) was an important master mason in Somerset, England.

As a stonemason and architect, William Arnold was head of a migrating band of professional Somerset stonemasons who worked on many houses. Arnold was known to have been living in Charlton Musgrove near Wincanton in 1595 where he was church warden.

His first known commission was for the design of Montacute House in c1598. This is one of the finest Elizabethan mansions in the country and was designed for Sir Edward Phelips.

Other works include the remodelling of a hunting lodge at Cranborne to form a manor house for Robert Cecil, 1st Earl of Salisbury in 1607–1610. He was then commissioned in 1610–1613 by Dorothy Wadham, a Somerset resident, to design and oversee the building of Wadham College, Oxford. Wadham College is widely regarded as the last major public building in the UK to have been built according to the mediaeval principles of a supervising master mason.

His last known work was remodelling Dunster Castle in 1617 for the owner George Luttrell. The interiors were completely modernised in the 1680s, and the exterior work only partially survives as Anthony Salvin remodelled and extended the castle in 1868.

== Gallery of architectural work ==
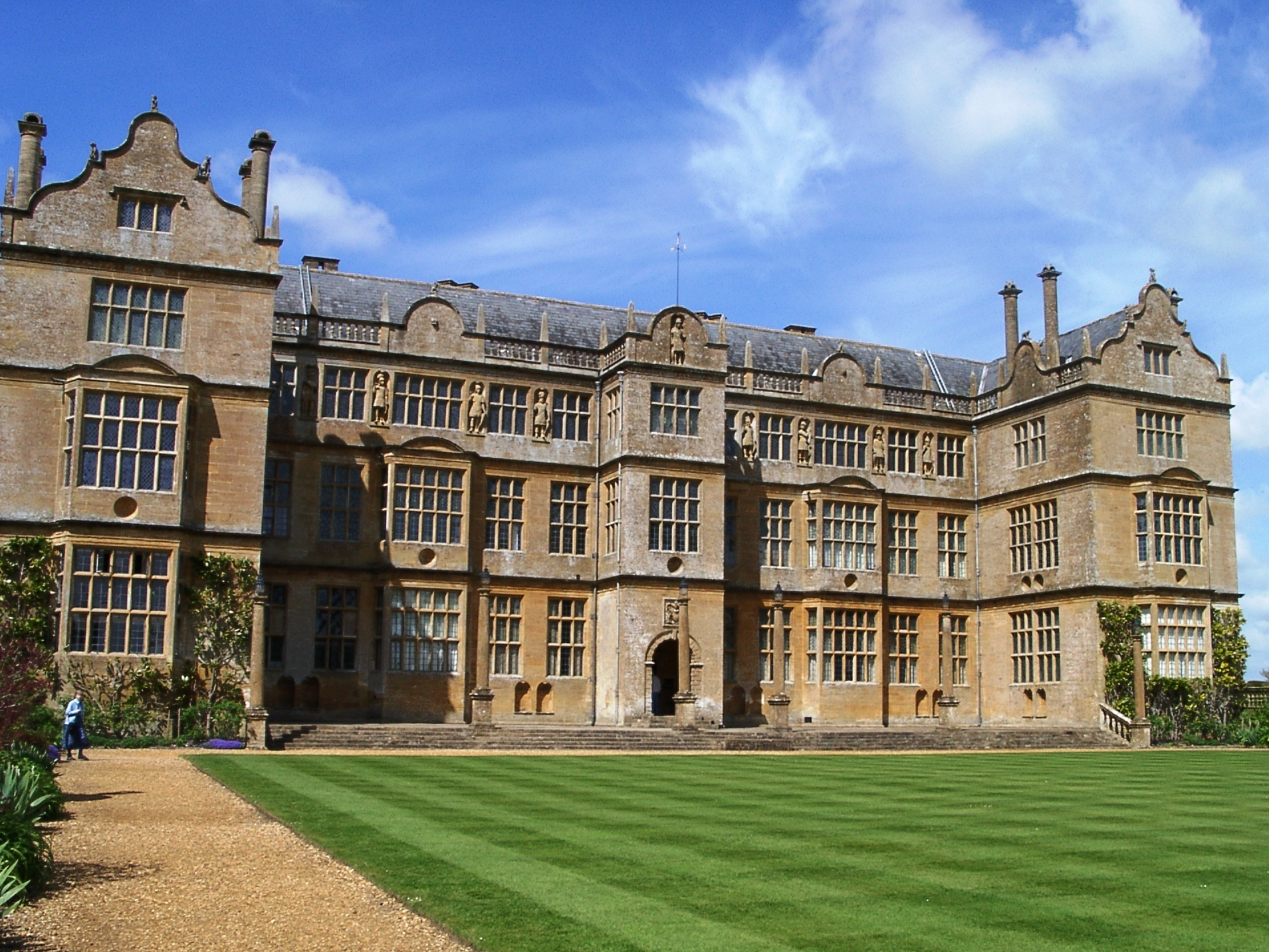
Montacute House, Somerset, south front

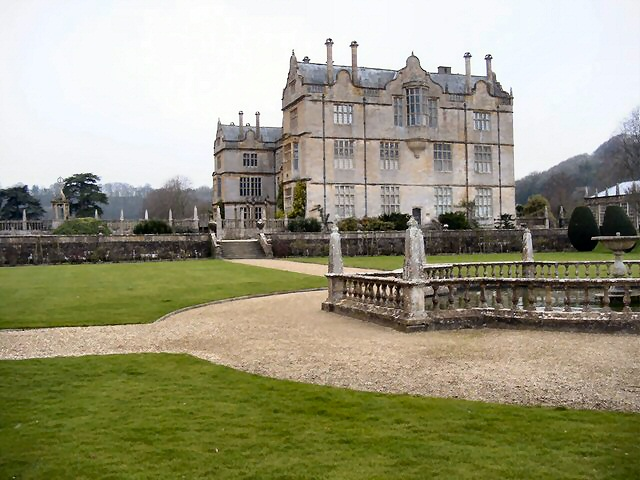
Montacute House, Somerset, from north-east

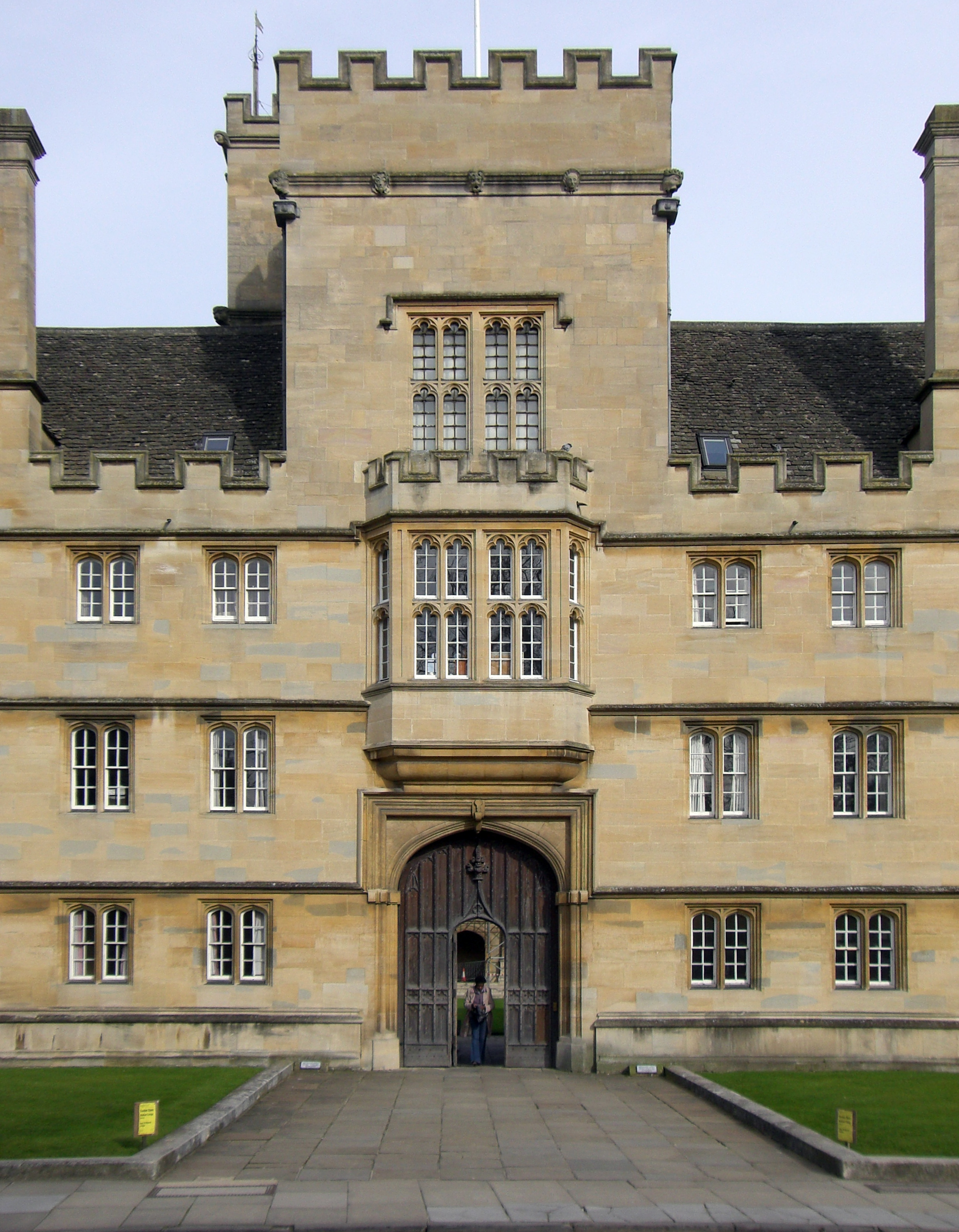
Wadham College, Oxford, gatehouse

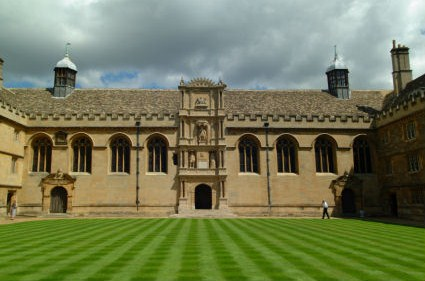
Wadham College, Oxford, quad

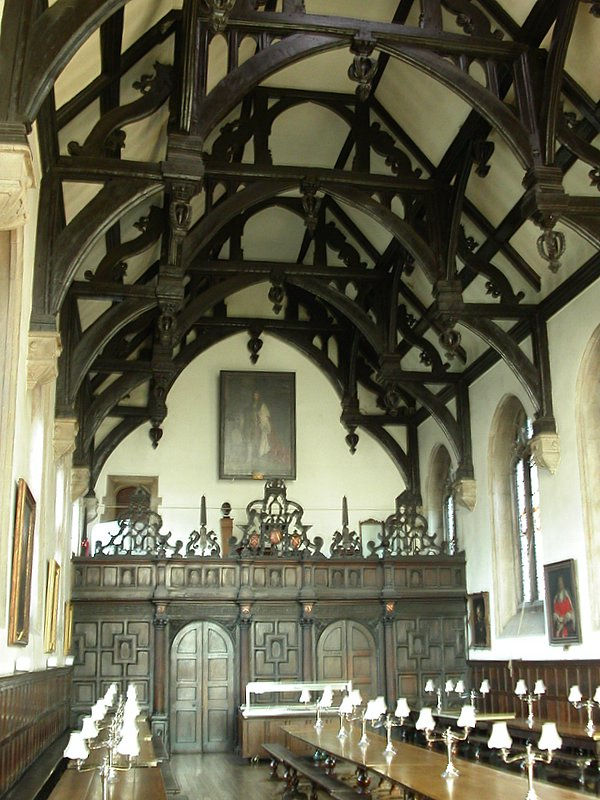
Wadham College, Oxford, hall

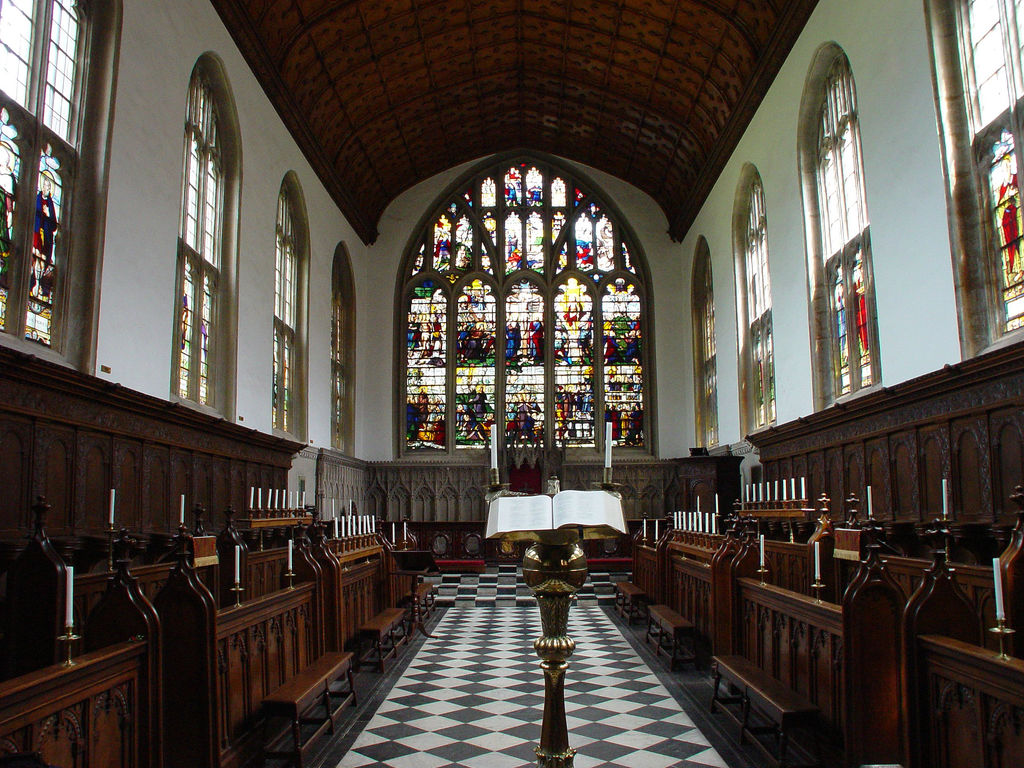
Wadham College, Oxford, chapel

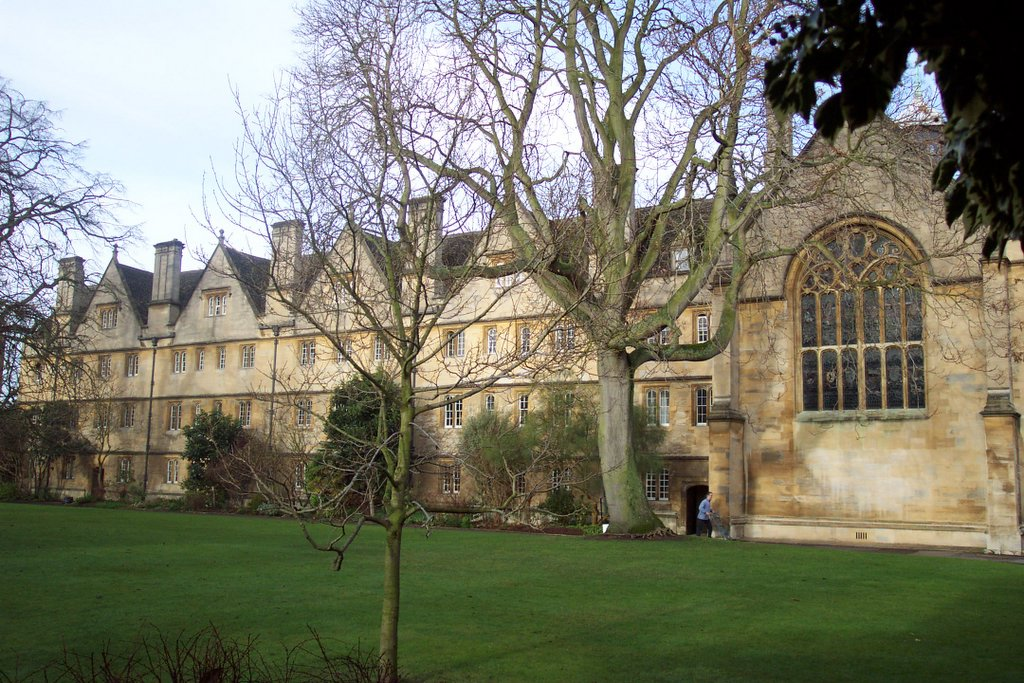
Wadham College, Oxford, exterior of hall

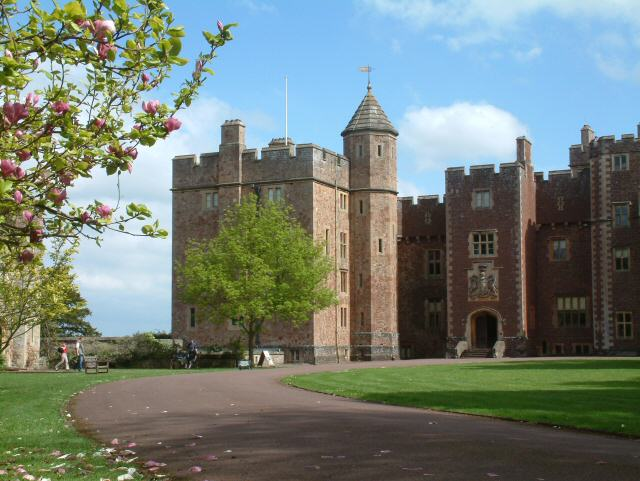
Dunster Castle, remodelled by Anthony Salvin, Arnold's work is visible on the right
