= Herbert Croft (died 1629) =

English politician

Sir Herbert Croft (1565 – 1 April 1629) was an English politician who sat in the House of Commons at various times between 1589 and 1614.

Croft was the eldest surviving son of Edward Croft of Croft Castle and his first wife. He was educated at Christ Church, Oxford. His father was put on his trial in 1589 on the charge of having contrived the death of the Earl of Leicester by witchcraft and went into exile. In 1589 Croft was elected Member of Parliament for Carmarthenshire. He was a J.P. for Carmarthenshire and for Herefordshire from 1591 and for Oxfordshire from about 1592. In about 1592 he became steward of the lordships of Kerry, Kedewen and Montgomery, Montontgomeryshire and was steward of crown lands in Herefordshire from October 1592.

In 1593 Croft was elected MP for Herefordshire. He succeeded his grandfather James Croft to the family estates in 1594. In 1597 he was elected MP for Launceston and became Deputy Lieutenant. He was receiver-general for South Wales from April 1599 to 1604. In 1601 he was elected MP for Herefordshire again. He became a member of the Council of Wales and the Marches from 1601. He was knighted in 1603. He was prevented from entering the House of Lords to hear the King's Speech during the 1601 State Opening of Parliament by a Yeoman of the Guard called Bryan Tashe, who subsequently apologised to the House of Commons for this "affront to the whole house." In 1604 he was re-elected MP for Herefordshire. In 1607 he protested about the jurisdiction of the council in the marches over the border shires and this cost him his seat on the council and his positions as JP and Deputy Lieutenant. He was re-elected MP for Herefordshire in 1614. In about 1617, he became a Catholic and a monk at the English Benedictine priory of St Gregory the Great at Douai, where he wrote pamphlets in defence of his new faith.

Croft died at the age of about 63.

Croft married Mary Bourne, daughter of Anthony Bourne of Holt Castle, Worcestershire and had four sons and five daughters. His son Herbert later became Bishop of Hereford.

A daughter Bridget Croft (1608-1694) died unmarried and was buried in Hereford Cathedral. Another daughter, Margery or Margaret Croft (d. 1637) was a lady in waiting to Elizabeth Stuart, Queen of Bohemia. In her will she hoped the queen would settle her debts at The Hague amounting to £100. In London she owed Mr Berry in Paternoster Row for white satin for a waistcoat and mohair for a gown.

Parliament of England
Preceded by Sir Thomas Johnes	Member of Parliament for Carmarthenshire; 1589	Succeeded by Walter Vaughan
Preceded by Sir James Croft; Sir John Scudamore	Member of Parliament for Herefordshire; 1593; With: Sir Thomas Coningsby	Succeeded by Sir Thomas Coningsby; Sir John Scudamore
Preceded by Roland Watson; George Grenville	Member of Parliament for Launceston; 1597; With: Sir William Bowyer	Succeeded by John Parker; Gregory Downhall
Preceded by Sir Thomas Coningsby; Sir John Scudamore	Member of Parliament for Herefordshire; 1601–1614; With: Sir James Scudamore	Succeeded by Sir John Scudamore; Fitzwilliam Coningsby
