= Cranborne Manor =

Grade I listed building in Dorset, England

Coordinates: 50.9185°N 1.9258°W

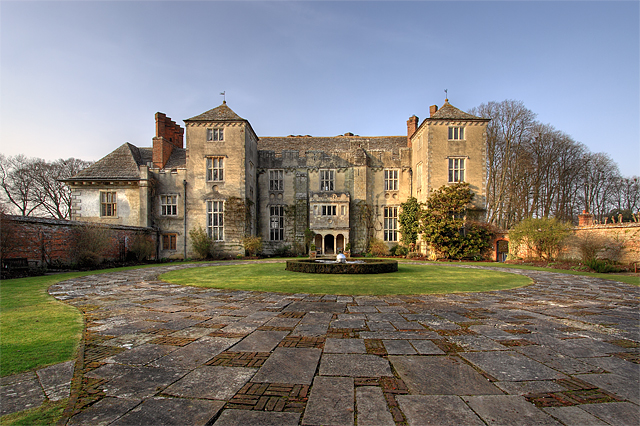
Cranborne Manor

Cranborne Manor is a Grade I listed country house in Cranborne, Dorset, in southern England.

The manor dates back to around 1207/8, and was originally a hunting lodge. It was re-modelled for Robert Cecil, 1st Earl of Salisbury in the early 17th century. The main seat of the earls and marquesses of Salisbury is Hatfield House in Hertfordshire, and Cranborne Manor is often the home of the heir to the title, who uses the courtesy title Viscount Cranborne.

== The house ==
The house is a Grade I listed building, being "extremely important both as a rare survival of early C13 domestic architecture and as a fine early C17 country house" remodelled, after 1608, by William Arnold who also worked on Dunster Castle in this period and built Montacute House and Wadham College, Oxford. The original Manor house was actually built for King John in the 12th century and was used as a royal hunting lodge. It is constructed of ashlar, rubble and flint with ashlar dressings. The roofs are tiled and slated, with brick chimney stacks. The house is E-shaped in plan with three storeys, attics and basement. Originally, the house probably had the hall on the first floor, and other rooms over a vaulted undercroft. The windows are seventeenth century and are mullioned. In the southwestern corner there is a tower.

The interior of the house has seventeenth-century panelling and fireplaces in many rooms, as well as a number of seventeenth-century stone doorways. The vaulted undercroft dates from the same period and has screens with Doric pilasters, and a gallery with arcaded panelling above. There are some remnants of the thirteenth-century chapel at the east end of the house.

== The estate and garden ==
The estate consists of a 3,000 acre in hand farm and over 1,700 acres of woods, as well as the park and gardens. The estate is owned by the Marquess of Salisbury through a set of offshore companies. The farm is mostly arable but there is some pastureland, mostly riverside meadows, where the beef suckler herd graze. The Manor is surrounded by extensive formal and informal gardens, lawns, a kitchen garden, walled gardens and an orchard. It contains a water mobile named 'La Source' created by Angela Conner and various other works of art. The garden is open to the public on a regular basis, but the house is not open to the public. The garden featured some of the Horticultural designs of Mollie Wyndham-Quinn, who married the Viscount Cranborne (later the 6th Marquess of Salisbury), before she restored the gardens at Hatfield House.
