= Griffith Hampden =

English politician (1543–1591)

Member of Parliament for Minehead
- In office 1584–1584

Personal details
- Born: 1543
- Died: 27 October 1591 (aged 47–48)

Griffith Hampden (1543 – 27 October 1591) was an English politician who was member of the Parliament of England for Buckinghamshire.

== Family ==
Hampden was the father of William Hampden and grandfather of John Hampden.
