= Edward Man =

English politician

Member of Parliament for Poole
- In office 1589–1611

Personal details
- Born: 1549
- Died: 22 December 1622 (aged 72–73)

Edward Man (c.1549 – 22 December 1622) was an English politician who was an MP for Poole in Dorset from 1589 to 1611.

== See also ==
- List of MPs elected to the English parliament in 1604
- List of MPs elected to the English parliament in 1597
- List of MPs elected to the English parliament in 1593
