= John Awdeley =

English politician (died c. 1594)

- Died: c. 1594

Member of the English Parliament for Lancaster and Stockbridge
- In office 1593 – 1593 Serving with John Preston (Lancaster) and Henry St John (Stockbridge)
- Monarch: Elizabeth I

John Audley II (also variously Awdeley and Awdley; died c. 1594) was an English member of parliament and Londoner originally from Lincolnshire.

== Personal life ==
According to The History of Parliament, John Audley II was likely the son of Thomas Audley (died c. 1561; of Haugh, Lincolnshire) and Elizabeth Warren (of Nottinghamshire), and an illegitimate descendant of Thomas Audley, 1st Baron Audley of Walden. When Audley's father died, he left his son £100 (equivalent to £40,332 in 2025), with which Audley followed older brothers to London, bought a house on Chancery Lane, and leased another in Borehamwood. He married Susan, the sister of John Stockwood and widow of "Thomas Field of London". When he died around 1594, Audley's son John was the sole executor of the undated will on 13 November 1594; Audley left his wife £200 (equivalent to £54,958 in 2025).

== Politicking ==
A member of the Parliament of England, Audley represented the Lancaster and Stockbridge constituencies at the 8th Parliament of Elizabeth I in 1593 (alongside John Preston and Henry St John respectively). P.W. Hasler wrote for The History of Parliament that Audley's election to two separate boroughs in the Duchy of Lancaster was surprising, and possibly an error on the part of Gilbert Gerard.
