= Montacute House =

Late Elizabethan mansion in Somerset, UK

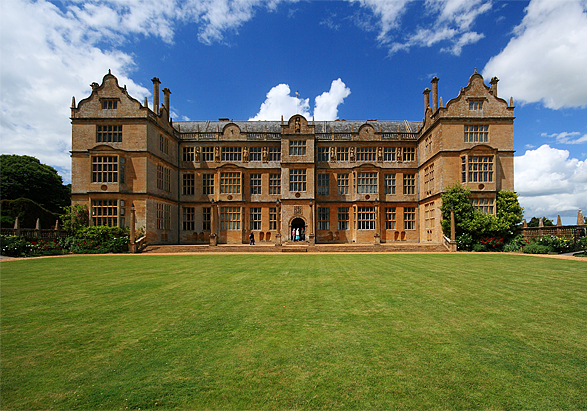
- The east front

- Location of Montacute House in Somerset
- 50°57′09″N 2°42′58″W,
- Location: Montacute, Somerset

Listed Building – Grade I

National Register of Historic Parks and Gardens

Montacute House is a late Elizabethan mansion in Montacute, South Somerset, England. An example of English architecture created during a period that was moving from the medieval Gothic to the more classically-inspired Renaissance style, Montacute is one of the few prodigy houses to have survived almost unchanged from the Elizabethan era. The house has been designated as a Grade I listed building, and its gardens are also listed at the highest grade on the Register of Historic Parks and Gardens of Special Historic Interest in England.

Designed by an unknown architect, possibly the mason William Arnold, the three-storey mansion, constructed of the local Ham Hill stone, was built in about 1598 for Sir Edward Phelips, a lawyer and politician who was Speaker of the House of Commons from 1604 until 1611, and subsequently Master of the Rolls from 1611 until his death in 1614. He was the prosecutor in the trial of the Gunpowder Plotters. Phelips' descendants occupied the house until the early 20th century. For a brief period, the house was let to tenants, one of whom was Lord Curzon, who lived at the house with his mistress, the novelist Elinor Glyn. The house narrowly escaped demolition in the early 20th century, when it was valued for scrap at just under £6,000. In 1931, it was purchased by the philanthropist Ernest Cook, who presented the house to the National Trust. One of the earliest of the Trust's acquisitions, the house came empty of its contents, and without the endowment the Trust subsequently required, its then secretary, James Lees-Milne describing it as an "empty and rather embarrassing white elephant".

The east front of the house, the intended principal façade, is distinguished by its Dutch gables. The original approach would have been far more impressive than is seen today; the east façade faced onto a large entrance court and the two remaining pavilions flanked a large gatehouse which was later demolished. This entrance court and gatehouse were approached through an even larger outer court. The courts were however not fortified, but bordered by ornate balustrading which, with the ogee roofs of the pavilions, are in reality follies, an ornamental and domestic acknowledgement of the fortified courts and approaches found in earlier medieval English manors and castles.

Montacute's Long Gallery, the longest in England, serves as an outpost of the National Portrait Gallery displaying a range of historical portraits. The house and its gardens have been a filming location for several films and a setting for television costume dramas and literary adaptations. It was visited by over 183,000 people in 2019-2020.

== History ==
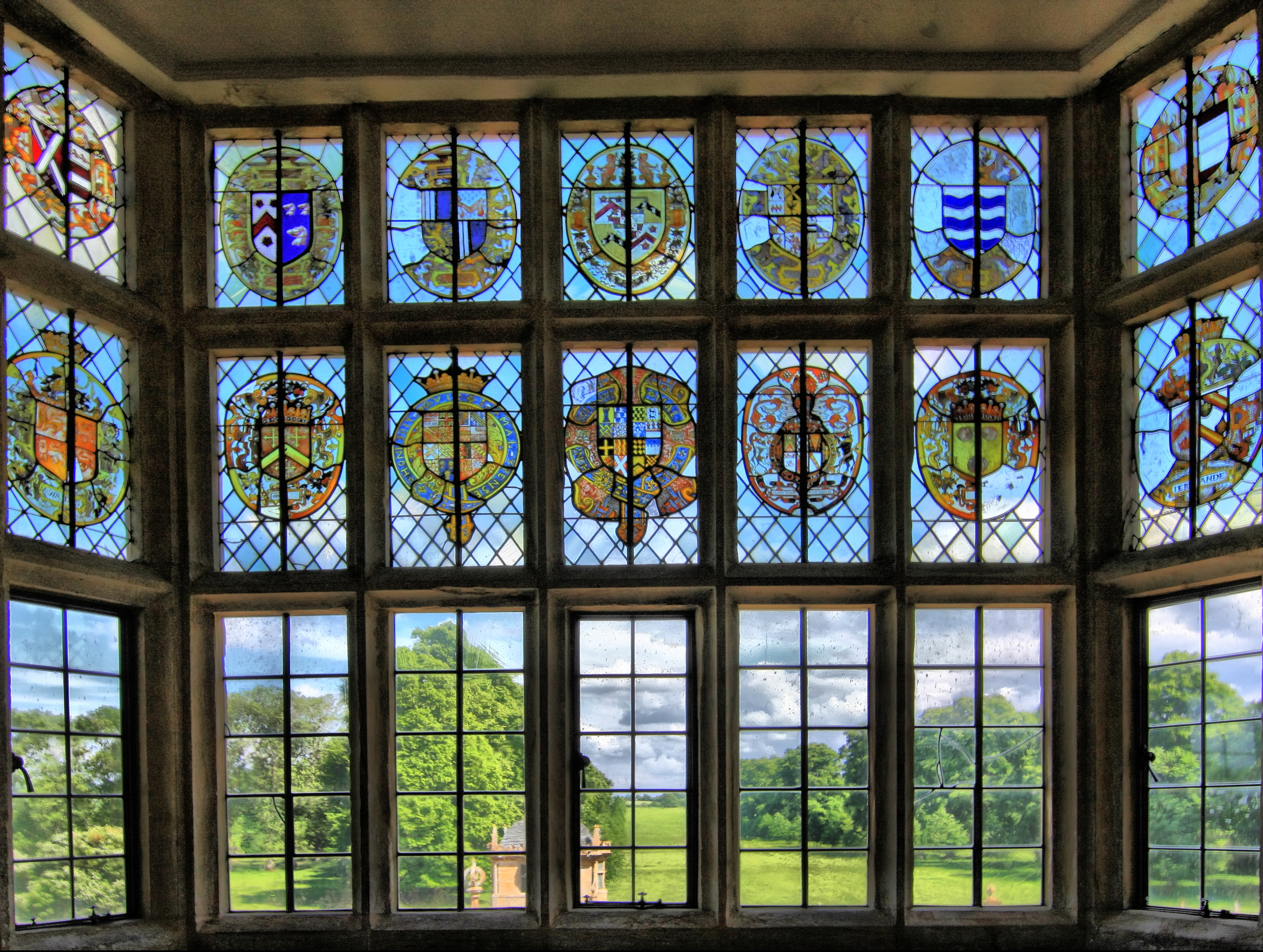
The window of the Great Chamber depicts the arms of families connected to the Phelips family by marriage

Montacute House was built in about 1598 by Sir Edward Phelips, whose family had lived in the Montacute area since at least 1460, first as yeomen farmers before rising in status. The site was bought from the Cluniac Montacute Priory by Thomas Phelips and passed to his grandson, also called Thomas, who started planning the house, but died before it was built and left the completion of the work to his son Edward. Edward Phelips was a lawyer who had been in Parliament since 1584. He was knighted in 1603 and a year later became Speaker of the House. James I appointed him Master of the Rolls and Chancellor to his son and heir Henry, Prince of Wales. Phelips remained at the hub of English political life, and his legal skills were employed when he became opening prosecutor during the trial of the Gunpowder Plotters.

Sir Edward's choice of architect is unknown, (Note: The term and profession of "architect" at this time was virtually unknown, as Howard Colvin explained in his preface "The Architectural Profession") although it has been attributed to the mason William Arnold, who was responsible for the designs of Cranborne Manor and Wadham College, Oxford, and had worked at Dunster Castle, also in Somerset. Dunster has architectural motifs similar to those found at Montacute. Phelips chose as the site for his new mansion a spot close by the existing house, built by his father. The date work commenced is undocumented, but is generally thought to be c. 1598/9, based on dates on a fireplace and in stained glass within the house. The date 1601, engraved above a doorcase, is considered to be the date of completion.

Sir Edward Phelips died in 1614, leaving his family wealthy and landed; he was succeeded by his son, Sir Robert Phelips, who represented various West Country constituencies in Parliament. Robert Phelips has the distinction of being arrested at Montacute. A staunch Protestant, he was subsequently imprisoned in the Tower of London as a result of his opposition to the "Spanish Match" between the Prince of Wales and a Catholic Spanish Infanta. (Note: The marriage never took place and the prince eventually married Henrietta Maria of France)

The family's fame and notoriety were to be short-lived. Subsequent generations settled down in Somerset to live the lives of county gentry, representing Somerset in Parliament (Note: Edward Phelips V became the fifth member of the family to represent Somerset in parliament. Before the electoral reforms of the 19th century, for the owners of estates such as Montacute, this was neither an arduous nor competitive occupation. Nevertheless Phelips' nomination was challenged in 1780 and he resigned the seat, "For the peace of the County and my own hard acquired Private family Fortune and Estate Underimpaired".) and when necessary following occupations in the army and the church. (Note: During the late 18th century, three Phelips brothers were simultaneously ordained, and their father and maternal grandfather were both vicars.) This peaceful existence was jolted when the estate was inherited by William Phelips (1823–89), who in his early days made many improvements and renovations to Montacute. He was responsible for the Base Court, a low service range adjoining the south side of the mansion. and the restoration of the Great Chamber, which he transformed into a library. Later, he was to become insane; an addicted gambler, he was eventually incarcerated for his own good. Sadly for his family, this was after he had gambled away the family fortune and vast tracts of the Montacute Estate. In 1875, when his son William Phelips (1846–1919) took control of the estate, agricultural rents from what remained of the mortgaged estate were low, and the house was a drain on limited resources. Selling the family silver and artworks delayed the inevitable by a few years, but in 1911 the family were forced to let the house, for an annual sum of £650, and move out. The Phelipses never returned.

By 1915, the original tenant, Robert Davidson, had departed and the house was let to George Curzon, 1st Marquess Curzon of Kedleston. A later tenant was the American writer Henry Lane Eno, who died at the house in 1928.

The house was never to be a private residence again. It was offered for sale in 1929, and at a time when many country houses were being demolished was given a scrap value of £5,882. With the exception of the Phelips family portraits, the historic contents and furnishing were disposed of, and the house, an empty shell, remained on the market for two years.

Finally, in 1931, the house was sold to the philanthropist Ernest Cook, who presented it to the Society for the Protection of Ancient Buildings, and from that Society, it passed to the National Trust. It was one of the Trust's first great houses. The following year, in 1932, it opened to the public for the first time. Bare of furnishing and without sufficient funds to maintain it, James Lees-Milne, the secretary of the Trust's country house committee, described the mansion as an "empty and rather embarrassing white elephant".

During the Second World War, Montacute was requisitioned by the army, and American soldiers were billeted in the surrounding parkland before the Normandy landings.

The house became a Grade I Listed Building on 19 April 1961, and the grounds were entered into the Register of Historic Parks and Gardens of Special Historic Interest in England on 1 June 1984.

== Architecture ==
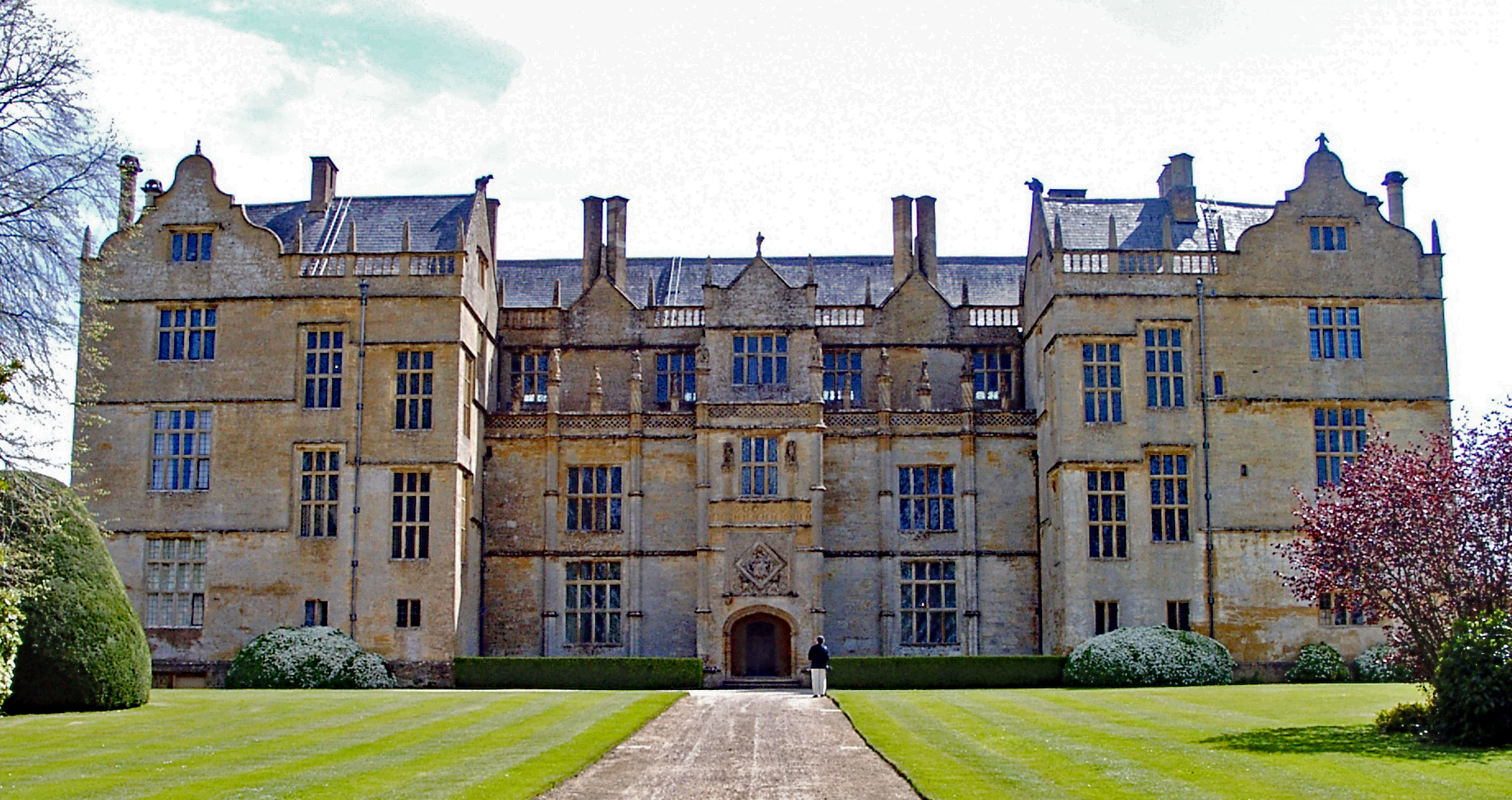
The West front of Montacute House which from the 18th century contained the principal entrance

Built in what came to be considered the English Renaissance style, the east front, the intended principal façade, is distinguished by its Dutch gables decorated with clambering stone monkeys and other animals.

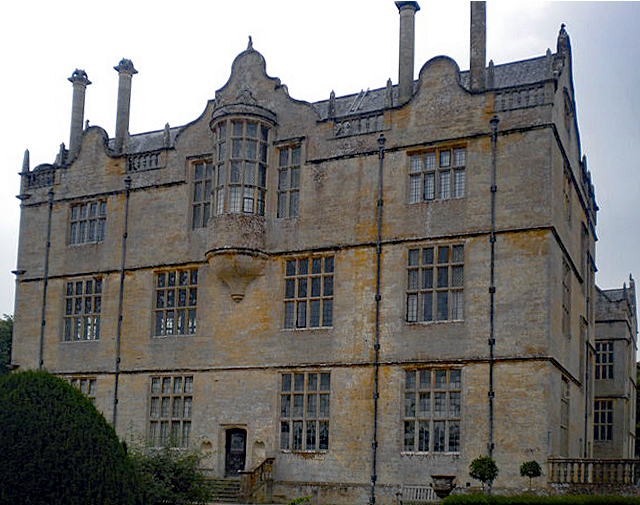
The North and South elevations are identical and have oriel windows at second floor level; these terminate the Long Gallery

Architecture during the early English Renaissance was far less formal than that of mainland Europe and drew from a greater selection of motifs both ancient and modern, with less emphasis placed on the strict observance of rules derived from antique architecture. This has led to an argument that the style was an evolution of Gothic rather than an innovation imported from Europe. This argument is evident at Montacute, where Gothic pinnacles, albeit obelisk in form, are combined with Renaissance gables, pediments, classical statuary, ogee roofs and windows appearing as bands of glass. This profusion of large, mullioned windows, an innovation of their day, gives the appearance that the principal façade is built entirely of glass; a similar fenestration was employed at Hardwick Hall in Derbyshire. However, despite the Dutch gables, a feature of the English Renaissance acquired as the style spread from France across the Low Countries to England, and the Gothic elements, much of the architectural influence is Italian.

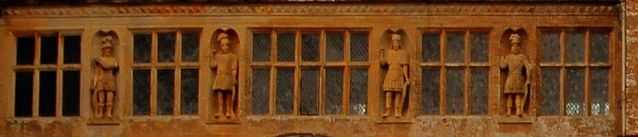
Statues of the Nine Worthies in niches on the piers of the Long Gallery (upper eastern facade)

The windows of the second-floor Long Gallery are divided by niches containing statues, an Italian Renaissance feature exemplified at the Palazzo degli Uffizi in Florence (1560–81), which at Montacute depict the Nine Worthies dressed as Roman soldiers; the bay windows have shallow segmented pediments – a very early and primitive occurrence of this motif in England – while beneath the bay windows are curious circular hollows, probably intended for the reception of terracotta medallions, again emulating the palazzi of Florence. Such medallions were one of the Renaissance motifs introduced to English Gothic architecture when Henry VIII was rebuilding Hampton Court and supporting the claim that the English Renaissance was little more than Gothic architecture with Renaissance ornament. At Montacute, however, the Renaissance style is not confined to ornament, the house also has perfect symmetry. Paired stair towers stand in the angles between the main body of the house and the wings that project forward, a sign of modern symmetry in the plan of the house as well as its elevation, and a symptom of the times, in that the hall no longer had a "high end" of greater state.

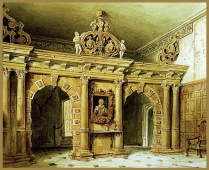
The stone screen in the Great Hall. In a Renaissance style, the proportion of the screen's Ionic columns suggests an uncertainty of classical motifs so newly introduced to England.

Montacute, like many Elizabethan mansions, is built in an 'E' shape, a much-used plan in this era. On the ground floor was the great hall, kitchens and pantries, on the upper floors, retiring rooms for the family and honoured guests. Over the centuries, the layout and use of rooms changed: drawing and dining rooms evolved on the ground floor.

The original approach to the house would have been far more impressive than the picturesque approach today. The east front was then the entrance façade and faced onto a large entrance court. The two remaining pavilions flanked a large gatehouse; this long-demolished structure contained secondary lodgings. In turn, the entrance court and gatehouse were approached through a larger outer court. The courts were however not fortified, but bordered by ornate balustrading, which with the ogee roofs of the pavilions, which in reality were follies, were a purely ornamental and domestic acknowledgement of the fortified courts and approaches found in earlier medieval English manors and castles.

As in all houses of the Elizabethan era, Montacute had no corridors: the rooms led directly from one to another. This changed in 1787 when stonework from a nearby mansion at Clifton Maybank (which was being partly demolished) was purchased by Edward Phelips (1725–97) and used to rebuild Montacute's west front. This provided a corridor giving privacy to the ground-floor rooms and first-floor bedrooms. Now, with the new frontage in place, the house was virtually turned around: the "Clifton Maybank" façade became the front entrance, and the impressive former front elevation now overlooked a lawn surrounded by flower borders, rather than the original entrance courtyard. The small pavilions with ogee domed roofs that flanked the demolished gatehouse remain. They may have been intended as banqueting houses, but by the 1630s were used as bedrooms.

== Interior ==
=== Ground floor ===
Ground-floor plan. Key: 1: East terrace, 2: Servant's Hall, 3: Kitchen, 4: Service rooms, 5: Originally two separate rooms, the "pannetry" (sic) and the "buttery", 6: Clifton Maybank corridor, 7: West-facing principal entrance, 8: Great Hall, 9: Drawing Room, 10: Parlour.

The addition of the Clifton Maybank corridor, built in the 18th century from stone obtained from another house then undergoing alteration, allowed the principal ground- and first-floor rooms to have some privacy from the servants' areas and linked the two staircases. It also allowed the house to be turned around by creating a new entrance façade facing west.

The Great Hall, leading off from the corridor, was the most important communal eating and living room, but by the time Montacute was completed the traditional Great Hall was largely an anachronism. Such halls continued to be built, however, albeit as at Montacute on a smaller scale. For the first few years after its completion, the servants continued to dine in the hall, but the family and honoured guests now ate in the Great Chamber above. The hall now served as a room to receive and also for processions to commence to the grander rooms above.

Leading off from the Great Hall are the family's private Drawing Room and Parlour. In the 16th and early 17th centuries, in a house such as Montacute, the Parlour was where the family would dine, possibly with some of their upper servants. It allowed them not only privacy from dining publicly in the hall but also less state and pomp than if dining in the Great Chamber above. Like its grander cousin above, the Parlour also had an adjoining principal bed chamber, now the Drawing Room, originally known as the White Chamber and later as the Round Parlour. As fashions and uses changed, and privacy from servants became desirable, like the later Baroque state apartments, these ground-floor rooms lost their original purpose and became a series of seemingly meaningless drawing rooms. The National Trust installed an incongruous 18th-century fireplace from Coleshill House in the Drawing Room in the mid-20th century. It is now furnished in 18th-century style.

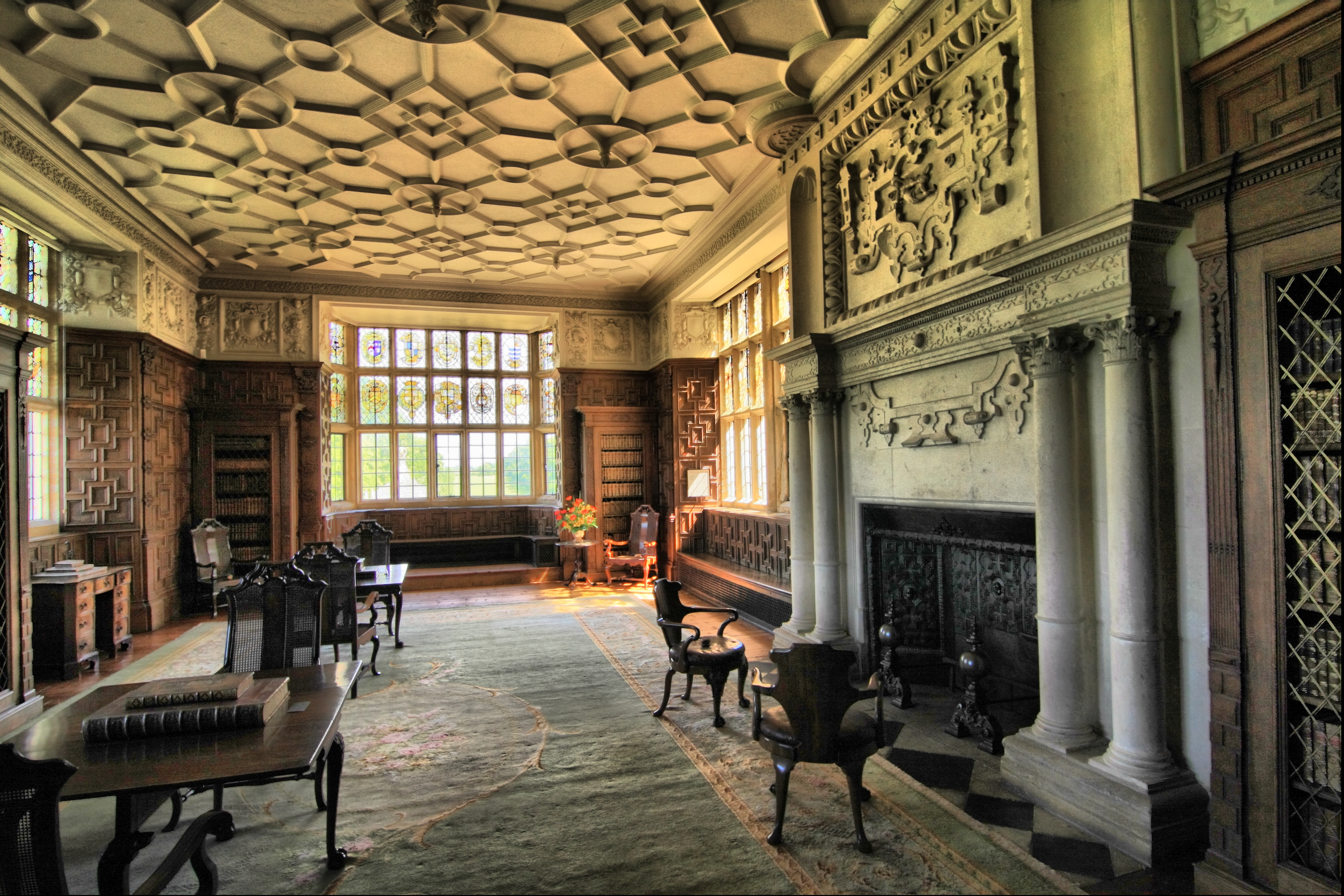
The former Great Chamber, now furnished as a library

The room on the opposite side of the Clifton Maybank corridor from the Great Hall was originally two rooms comprising the "pannetry" (sic) and "buttery". In a large household the buttery and "pannetry" were part of the offices pertaining to the kitchen, and as at Montacute they were generally close to the Great Hall. The buttery was traditionally the place from which the yeoman of the buttery served beer and candles to those lower members of the household not entitled to drink wine. Montacute's buttery is typical, as it had a staircase to the beer cellar below. The "pannetry" was the room from which the yeoman of the pantry served bread. By the time of Montacute's completion, upper servants often dined and entertained visiting servants in the pantry. This layout was a medieval concept (Note: A near identical layout of pantry and buttery in relation to the Great Hall exists at the much earlier Haddon Hall and Dartington Hall.) and later, as custom dictated that servants withdraw from the principal areas of the house, these rooms became used by the family as reception and private dining rooms. Eventually, in the early 20th century, Lord Curzon amalgamated the two rooms to create the grand, and socially necessary, dining room, which Montacute had lacked since the Great Chamber had been abandoned more than 100 years earlier.

The Servant's Hall, from which a staircase in the bay window descends to the basement, became the servant's dining room at the beginning of the 18th century. Outside, the six Doric columns on the East Terrace originally had decorative finials, now replaced by lamps.

=== First floor ===
First floor: 1: Library (formerly known as the Great Chamber); 2: Anteroom; 3: Garden Chamber; 4: Crimson Chamber; 5: The Hall Chamber; 6: Brown Room; 7: Jerusalem Chamber; 8: Print Room (when required used as a nursery); 9: Blue Parlour (later the children's school room) 10: Green Chamber; 11:Yellow Chamber; 12: Blue Chamber; 13: Upper floor of the Clifton Maybank corridor

The first floor contains one of the grandest rooms in the house, the Library. The room was formerly known as the Great Chamber; in a 16th-century mansion, such as Montacute, this room was the epicentre of all ceremony and state: hence, its position at the head of the principal staircase, making it the finale of a processional route. Here, the most important guests would have been received, and where the Phelips dined formally with their guests and where musical entertainment and dancing would take place. The Great Chamber at Montacute contains the finest chimney-piece in the house; however, its classical statuary depicting nudes is long gone, victims of Victorian prudery. During the 18th century the room was shut up and used as a store and permitted to decay; this explains why in the 19th century it was completely restored in "Elizabethan style". The strapwork ceiling, panelling and bookcases all date from this period. The only original features remaining are the heraldic stained glass in the windows and the Portland stone chimney-piece. The room contains an ornate carved wooden porch; installed in the library in the 1830s, it was originally in the parlour below.

At the head of the principal staircase, an Anteroom divides the former Great Chamber from what would have been the main bedroom. During the 19th century, this room was furnished as an armoury. The adjoining bedroom, the Garden Chamber, was used as a bedroom by Lord Curzon during the early 20th century, and as such was equipped with a plumbed bath hidden in a wardrobe, one of the few in the house.

The Hall Chamber

Further rooms on this floor include the Crimson Chamber, which together with its small adjoining dressing room formed one room accessed from the Great Chamber. Described in 1638 the "withdrawinge roome", it was used by the family to withdraw from the more public ceremonies held in the Great Chamber and also could be used to form a suite with the neighbouring bedroom, the Hall Chamber, when eminent guests were entertained in the house.

The Hall Chamber was another of the principal bedrooms; the adjoining Crimson Chamber originally served as the Hall Chamber's "withdrawinge roome". as the room was described in 1638. As a suite, the rooms were intended to be accessed by a now-blocked door in the Great Chamber. In this way, if an extremely high ranking guest was being entertained, they would then take over the entire suite including the Great Chamber. Although Montacute was equipped for a visiting sovereign, by the time it was completed Elizabeth I was dead and the family's prominence was waning.

The floor has numerous other smaller rooms. As elsewhere in the house their usage frequently changed according to the requirements of the mansion's occupants, and room names therefore often changed according to their use and decoration.

=== Second floor ===
Second-floor plan. Key: 1: Long Gallery, 2: Blew Chamber in 1635, now an exhibition room, 3: Wainscott Chamber in 1635, now an exhibition room, 4: Former bedroom, not open to the public, 5: Primrose Chamber in 1635, now an exhibition room, 6: White Chamber in 1635, now an exhibition room.

A notable feature of the house is the 172-foot (52 m) second-floor Long Gallery, spanning the entire top floor of the house; it is the longest surviving long gallery in England. The gallery is lit by a continuous wall of glass on its eastern side while its length is extended by oriel windows at each end, which from the exterior appear to cling perilously to the wall, supported only by a small corbel to the masonry.

Long galleries were a feature of large 16th- and 17th-century houses and had many purposes, from entertaining to exercising during inclement weather; the Phelips children would lead their ponies up these stairs to ride in the gallery. Today, it is used by the National Portrait Gallery to display part of its collection.

Various former bedrooms lead from the Long Gallery, and like the gallery are now hung with paintings on loan from the National Portrait Gallery.

The attic floor above the second floor, which is not open to the public, contains some garret rooms that would always have been secondary bedchambers. It is likely that in the 16th and 17th centuries they would have been occupied by the senior servants; the lower servants would have slept in any vacant corner or space on the ground or basement floors.

== Montacute House Gardens ==
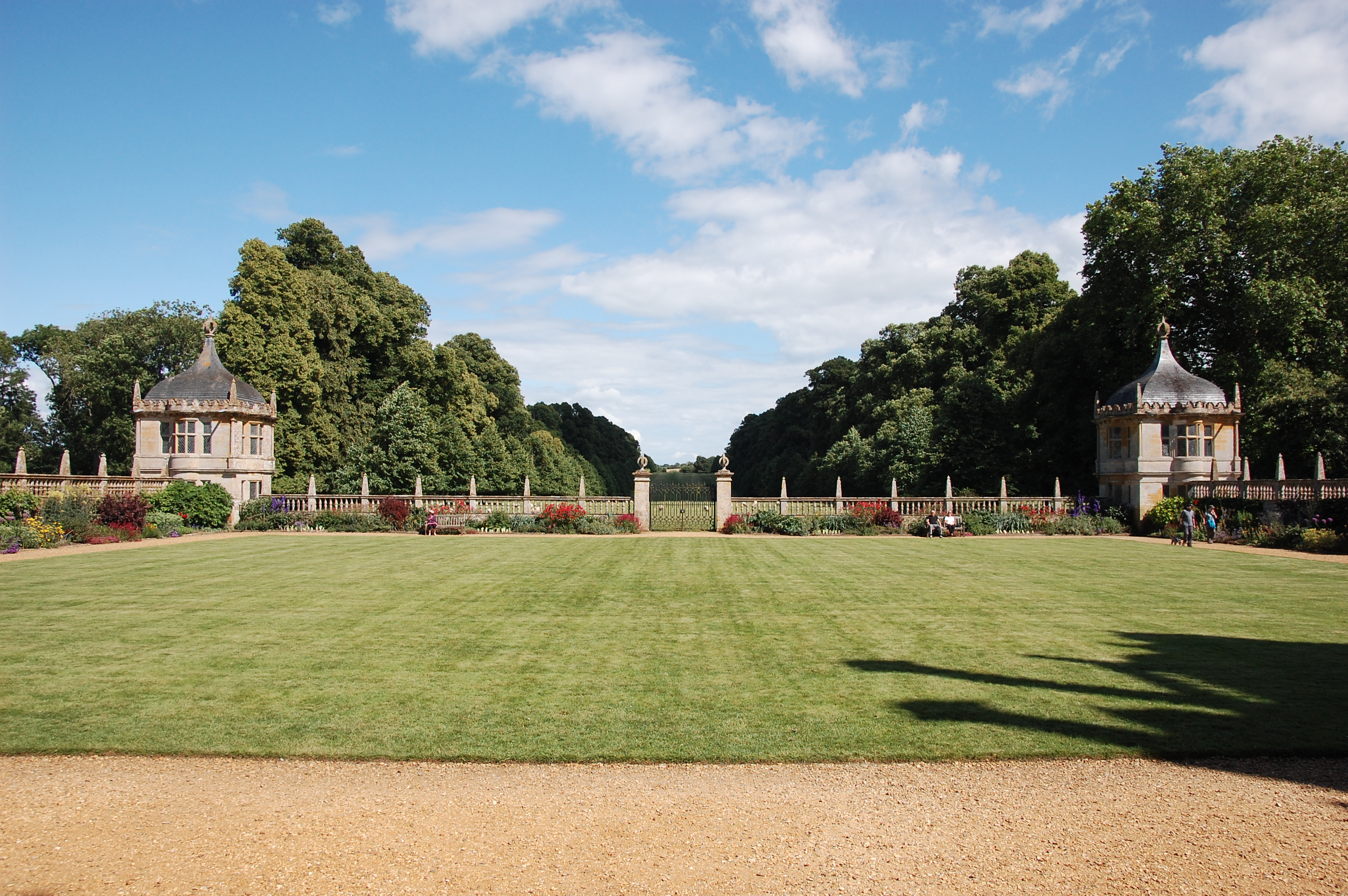
The former entrance forecourt with its twin garden pavilions which once flanked a gatehouse.

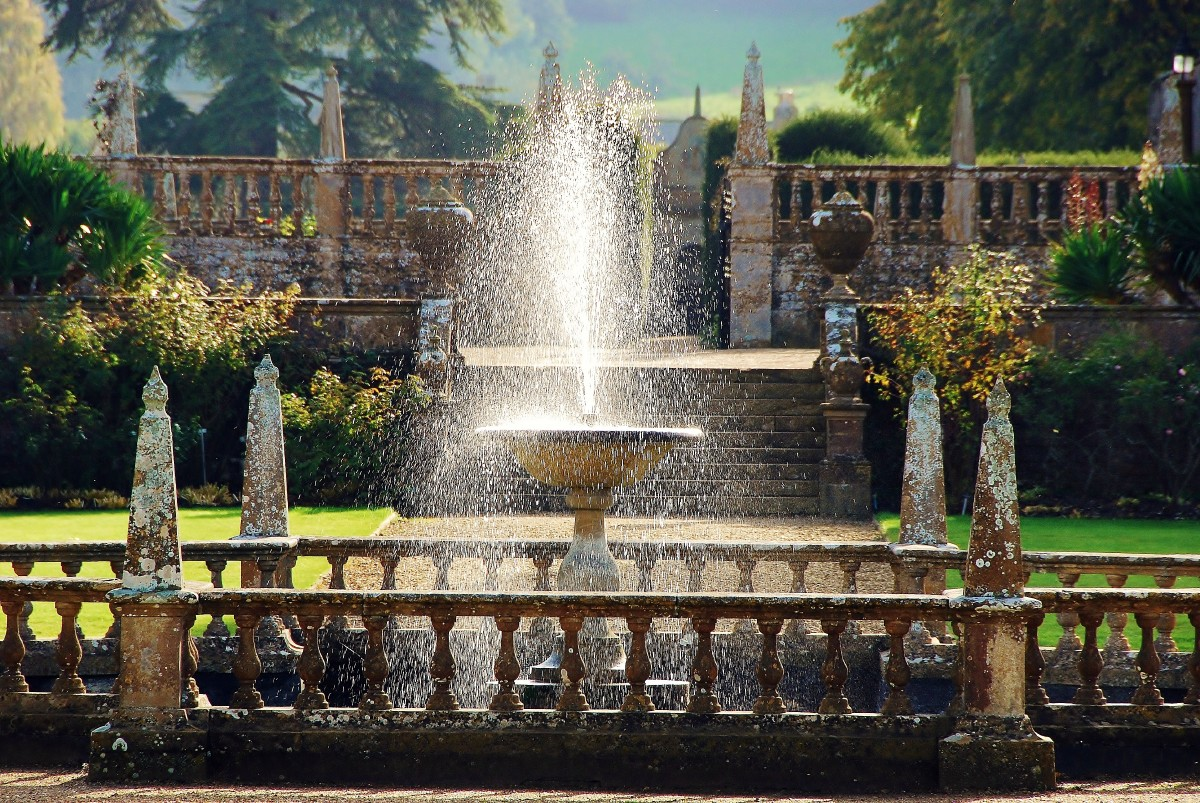
Jacobean style fountain in the sunken garden

The gardens were well established by 1633, and by 1667 several walled gardens and courts had been added with established orchards. They were accompanied by stone gate lodges, which were removed in the 18th century.

The north-east and south-east corners of the former entrance forecourt have pavilions with ogee domed roofs, oriel windows and obelisks. The latter two are motifs of the house itself. The garden planting, laid out within the former forecourt and in the slightly sunken grassed parterre square, was the work of Mrs Ellen Phelips, who lived at Montacute from the 1840s to her death in 1911, and her gardener, Mr Pridham, who had worked for her at Coker Court. The avenue of clipped yews that reinforces the slightly gappy mature avenue of trees stretching away from the outer walls of the former forecourt to end in fields, and the clipped yews that outline the grassed parterre date from that time, though the famous "melted" shape of the giant hedge was inspired by the effects of a freak snowfall in 1947. The sunken parterre garden design, with its Jacobean-style central fountain, designed by Robert Shekelton Balfour (1869–1942), is of 1894; Balfour's dated design is conserved in the library of the Royal Institute of British Architects. Mixed borders in the East court were replanted by Phyllis Reiss of Tintinhull in powerful hot colours when the earlier tender colour scheme laid down by Vita Sackville-West proved insipid to modern taste.

There are around 106 hectares (260 acres) of parkland and 4 hectares (9.9 acres) of more formally laid out gardens. These are the remains of the 121 hectares (300 acres) of parkland that previously surrounded the house.

=== Listing designations ===
The gardens and parkland surrounding Montacute are listed, Grade I, on the Register of Historic Parks and Gardens of Special Historic Interest in England. The house itself is also listed at this, the highest, grade, as are the two pavilions and the gateway flanking the East forecourt. The South lodge is listed at the next highest grade, II*. Other listed buildings on the estate, all designated Grade II, comprise: the New lodge and the Odcomb gate; the south-west and the north-west gates; the stables and the orangery adjacent to the house; and various architectural features in the gardens, including steps to the sunken garden, the pool and fountain in the North garden, a summer house restored by Lord Curzon, the North and East terraces, and two walled enclosures.

== Present day ==
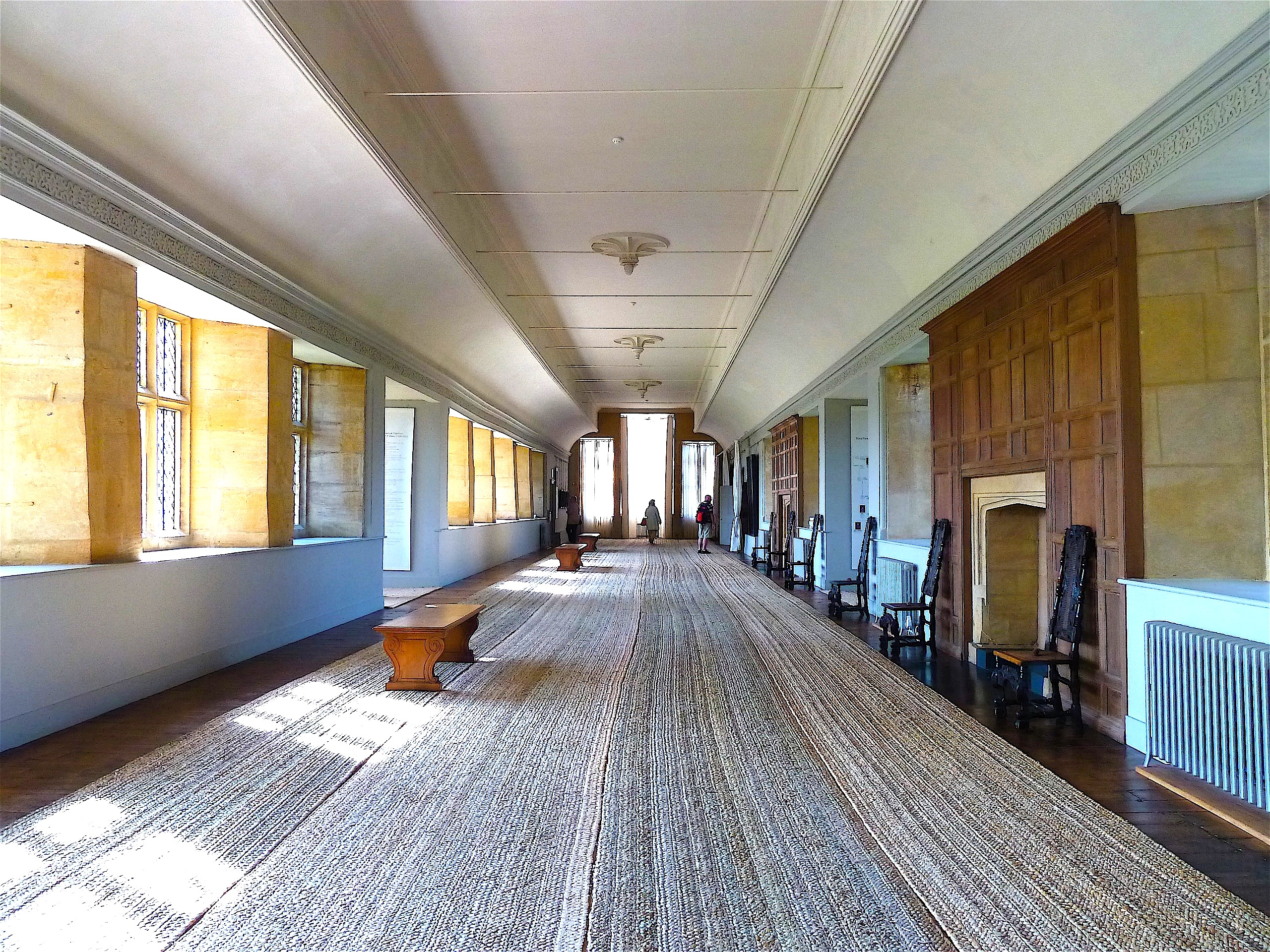
The 172 ft (52 m) Long Gallery

During the last quarter of the 20th century the gardens and grounds were restored and replanted. In 1975, London's National Portrait Gallery formed the first of its regional partnerships, a partnership that marries empty large antique spaces with the many paintings the gallery has insufficient space to display. This has seen Montacute's Long Gallery redecorated and restored and hung with an important collection of historical portraits from the reign of Henry VIII to that of Charles I.

The house and grounds are open to the public. In 2019-2020, the National Trust recorded over 183,000 visitors.

== In popular culture ==
The house and village have often featured as locations for films. Several scenes of the 1995 film version of Jane Austen's novel Sense and Sensibility were filmed at Montacute, as were scenes from the 2004 film The Libertine. The house was used as Baskerville Hall for a version of The Hound of the Baskervilles filmed in 2000 for Canadian television. In May–June 2014 the house was used as one of the locations for the BBC's adaption of Hilary Mantel's novel, Wolf Hall. The Wallace and Gromit short film for 2012 is set at a house that seems to be based on Montacute House. The short was created in celebration of the National Trust and is titled "A Jubilee Bunt-A-Thon". The fictional location for the earlier Wallace and Gromit film The Curse of the Were-Rabbit, Tottington Hall, was also based on Montacute. The 2026 film Savage House was filmed at the house.

== See also ==
- List of National Trust properties in Somerset
