= William Hampden (1570–1597) =

English politician (1570 – 1597)

William Hampden (5 November 1570 – 4 April 1597) was an English politician who was member of the Parliament of England for East Looe in Cornwall in the Parliament of 1593.

== Family ==
Hampden was a son of MP Griffith Hampden and his wife Anne Cave. He was married to the sister of Oliver Cromwell, Elizabeth Cromwell (1574-1664). They had two sons John Hampden and Richard Hampden.

Hampden died aged 26.

== See also ==
- List of MPs elected to the English parliament in 1593
