= 8th Parliament of Elizabeth I =

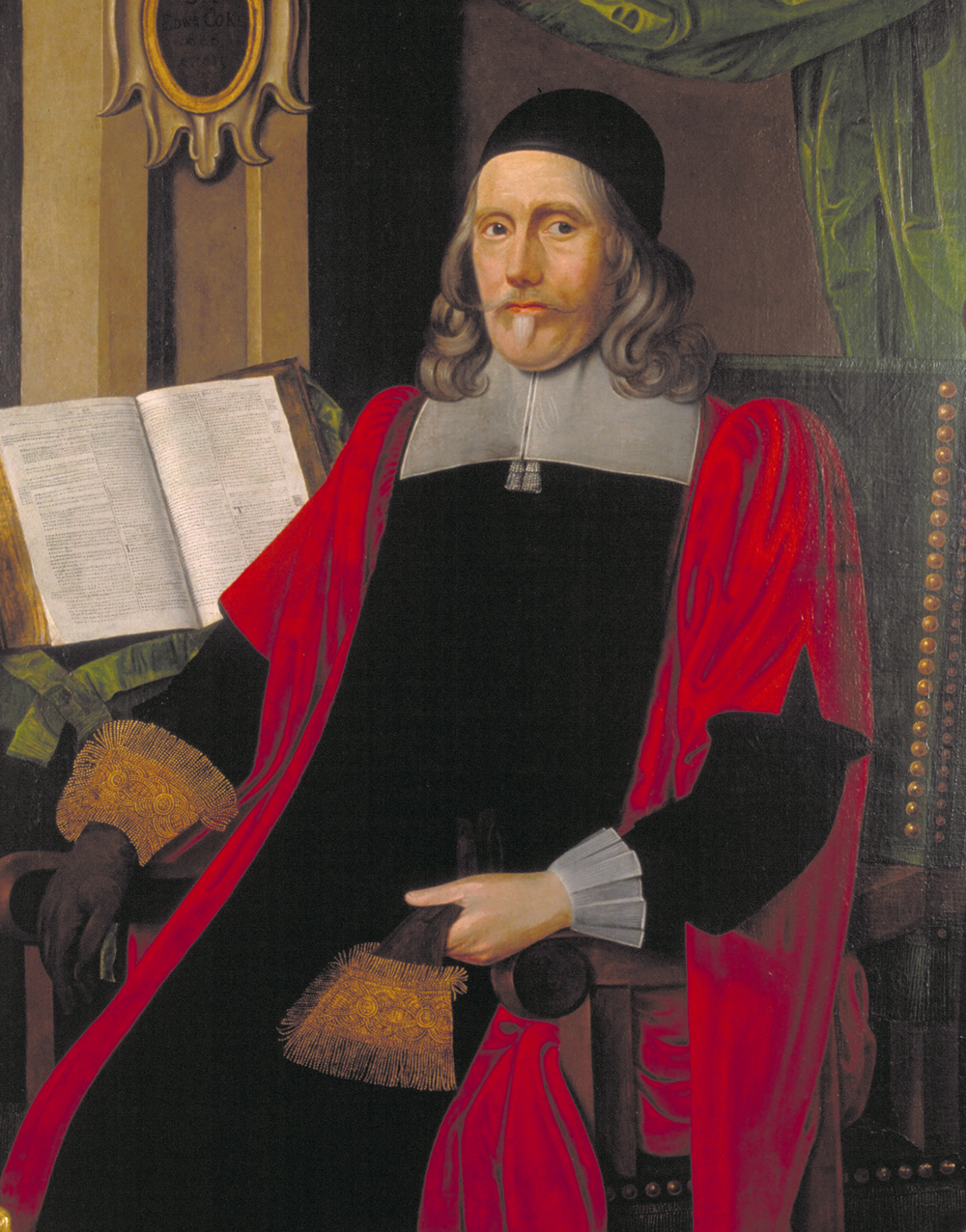
The Speaker, Edward Coke

The 8th Parliament of Queen Elizabeth I was summoned by Queen Elizabeth I of England on 4 January 1593 and assembled on 19 February following. Edward Coke, the Solicitor-general and Member of Parliament (MP) for Norfolk, was appointed speaker of the commons. At the state opening of Parliament the Lord Keeper Sir John Puckering informed the house that the reasons for summoning the Parliament were the threat of Spanish invasion and the Queen's "extraordinarye and most excessive expenses". This parliament occurred in the context of an ongoing Spanish-English conflict. At the time parliament was called, the Spanish and English were in the midst of ongoing strife that began decades prior and threatened the prosperity of England. Although relations between Spain and England at the start of Elizabeth’s reign began in a largely cordial manner, the two countries came into conflict over their investments in the Americas along with religious differences; Spain was a Catholic nation while England was a largely Protestant nation. Philip II of Spain was in frequent competition with Elizabeth for influence and resources in the New World and sought to weaken England’s sway in the region. In 1582 Philip began preparing a fleet to invade England, the Spanish Armada. Three years later in 1585, Elizabeth and her government feared Philip’s growing power as his empire came “dangerously near to total supremacy in Western Europe,” which threatened the stability of Elizabeth’s rule. By 1588 the Spanish Armada had been successfully prepared for battle and began an invasion of England led by the duke of Medina Sidonia who sailed with 130 ships carrying 29,453 men in total. Their goal: overthrow Elizabeth. Ultimately, the Spanish Armada failed to defeat the British in battle and take Elizabeth’s crown, but it served as a stark reminder to England that the country was not safe from a Spanish threat. This matter of urgency was a major topic of discussion during the 8th Parliament.

On 26 January, during the parliament, privy councillors Robert Cecil and John Wolley, together with the Chancellor of the Exchequer Sir John Fortescue, discussed the Spanish threat in greater detail. On 7 March member of Parliament Sir Henry Unton continued discussions on the Spanish threat in the House of Commons noting, “They [the Spanish] prepare mighty forces in many places, thretninge us therewith and doe use all manner of treasons and trecheries to woorke their will.”

On 24 January Peter Wentworth, the MP for Northampton, sought leave to present a bill for "intayling (restricting) the (royal) succession", for which he was sent to the Tower of London and four other colluding MPs locked in the Fleet Prison for the duration of the session. Queen Elizabeth, at the age of 60, was childless, which greatly worried her advisors who feared a tumultuous transition of power if Elizabeth refused to choose and prepare a successor prior to her death. Elizabeth refused to broach the topic during the parliament and the issue remained unresolved at the close of the parliament in April.

James Morice, the MP for Colchester, wanted to introduce two bills to restrict the jurisdiction of the bishops, but the Queen was highly offended and ordered Parliament not to get involved in ecclesiastical affairs. Morice was put under house arrest for the duration of the Parliament.

After a great deal of debate on the issue of raising money to deal with the threat of Spanish invasion a compromise was eventually reached on a subsidy. Two other bills were passed restricting the rights and freedoms of Catholics. In total 14 public and 13 private statutes received royal assent.

The Parliament was dissolved on 10 April 1593.

== Notable acts of the Parliament ==
- Religion Act 1592
- Popish Recusants Act 1592

== See also ==
- List of acts of the 8th Parliament of Queen Elizabeth I
- List of MPs elected to the English parliament in 1593
- List of parliaments of England
