= Nicholas Saunders (died 1605) =

English politician

Nicholas Saunders (died 1605) was an English politician.

He was the only son of Thomas Saunders of Uxbridge, Middlesex and educated at King's College, Cambridge (1565).

He was employed as a government messenger carrying state correspondence to overseas countries. At one stage (1585) he got into debt and spent time in prison.

He was elected a Member (MP) of the Parliament of England for Penryn in 1589, St. Ives in 1593, Helston in 1597 and Lostwithiel in 1601.

He never married.
