= Nowell Sotherton =

16th-century English politician

Nowell Sotherton (died c. 1610) of St. Botolph's-without-Aldersgate, London, was an English politician.

== Family ==
He married Timothea and they had several children. By the time of his death, he had one surviving daughter and a grandson. The Sotherton family were originally from Suffolk and the poor of London and Suffolk were remembered in his will, as was Giles Fettiplace.

== Career ==
He was a Member (MP) of the Parliament of England for Dorchester in 1589 and for St Ives in 1593 and 1597, and of Gray's Inn.
