= Reade Stafford =

Sir Reade Stafford (1542–1605) was an English gentleman who twice was briefly a Member of Parliament in the late Elizabethan era.

Read was the eldest son of Thomas Stafford of Bradfield Place in Berkshire, and his wife, Anne Best. Reade Stafford married Mabel, the widow of Francis Waferer of the City of London and of Nicholas Williams of Burghfield in Berkshire and daughter of Richard Staverton of Warfield, also in Berkshire, in 1570. He inherited Bradfield from his father in 1584. He was a Member of Parliament for East Grinstead in 1593 and Truro, Cornwall 1597–1598, alongside Maurice Berkeley.
