= Thomas Fitzherbert (MP for Newcastle-under-Lyme) =

English politician

Thomas Fitzherbert (ca. 1550–1600) was an English politician.

He was a member (MP) of the parliament of England for Newcastle-under-Lyme in 1593.
