= Francis Neale (MP) =

English politician

Francis Neale (fl. 1593–1597) was an English politician.

He was a member (MP) of the parliament of England for Grantham in 1593 and 1597.
