= Arthur Atye =

16th-century English politician

Sir Arthur Atye or Atey (died 1604) was an English academic and politician.

== Life ==
Atye graduated B.A. at Christ Church, Oxford in 1560, and M.A. in 1564. A fellow of Merton College, Oxford, he became Principal of St Alban Hall in 1572. Between 1566 and 1568 he went with John Man on a diplomatic mission in Spain. He was six times a Member of Parliament: for Liverpool in 1572 and 1584; for Fowey in 1589; for Shaftesbury in 1593; for Dunwich in 1597; and for Bere Alston (1604).

He acted as secretary to Robert Dudley, 1st Earl of Leicester. Later he worked for Robert Devereux, 2nd Earl of Essex, and translated political works from Spanish. He was knighted in 1603.

Atye was also one of the trading group in Leicester's circle involved in commerce with Morocco, with Alexander Avenon and Richard Staper. The merchant Benedict Barnham left money to Atye and his wife.

Atye was residing at Kilburn when he died; he owned property in several other locations around London, including Harrow-on-the-Hill where he was buried. His eldest son and heir Robert was still a minor.

== Family ==
Atye married first Anne Quarles, the widow of William Ricthorne, who died in 1583; there were no children of the marriage. He then married Judith, daughter of Walter Hungerford of Cadenham. Wiltshire. They had three or four sons, and a daughter. His widow married Sir John Dormer.
