= Richard Sparry =

16th-century English politician

Richard Sparry (c. 1530 – 1602), of Totnes and Staverton, Devon, was an English politician.

He was a member (MP) of the parliament of England for Totnes in 1593.
