= Edward Barker (MP) =

English politician

Edward Barker (died 1602) was an English politician.

He was a member (MP) of the parliament of England for Mitchell in 1584, St Germans in 1586, Andover in 1593, Taunton in 1597, and Downton in 1601.
