= Thomas Crompton (died 1601) =

English politician

Thomas Crompton (died 1601), was an English politician.

== Life ==
Crompton was the second son of John Crompton of Prestall, Deane, Bolton, Lancashire and subsequently of London, and his wife Anne, daughter of Ralph Ashton of [Great Lever], Lancs.

By 1580 Crompton was working as chirographer of the Court of Common Pleas, when he was granted permission to build a new Fines Office in the grounds of the Inner Temple. The buildings were erected in Middle Temple Lane and known as Crompton's Building and Crompton was granted admission to the Inner Temple.

By 1589 he had become an agent for Robert Devereux, 2nd Earl of Essex. It was presumably to the Earl's influence that he owed his parliamentary seats for Steyning in 1589, Radnor in 1593 and for both Leominster and Beverley in 1597. In the latter case it is not recorded which constituency he represented.

He made his will on 24 October 1601 and had died by 31 October, when John Chamberlain reported the death of "Crompton of the Fine Office".

== Family ==
He married Mary, the daughter of Robert Hodgson of London. By 1601 he had 4 sons and 7 daughters. His daughter Mary married William Gee, recorder of Beverley in 1597.

Parliament of England
| Preceded by Sir Thomas Bishop; Henry Shelley | Member of Parliament for Steyning; 1589–1593; With: Henry Apsley | Succeeded by Sir Walter Waller; Sir Thomas Shirley |
| Preceded by James Walter | Member of Parliament for New Radnor; 1593–1597 | Succeeded by Edward Lewis |
