= Francis Hastings (died 1610) =

English Puritan politician

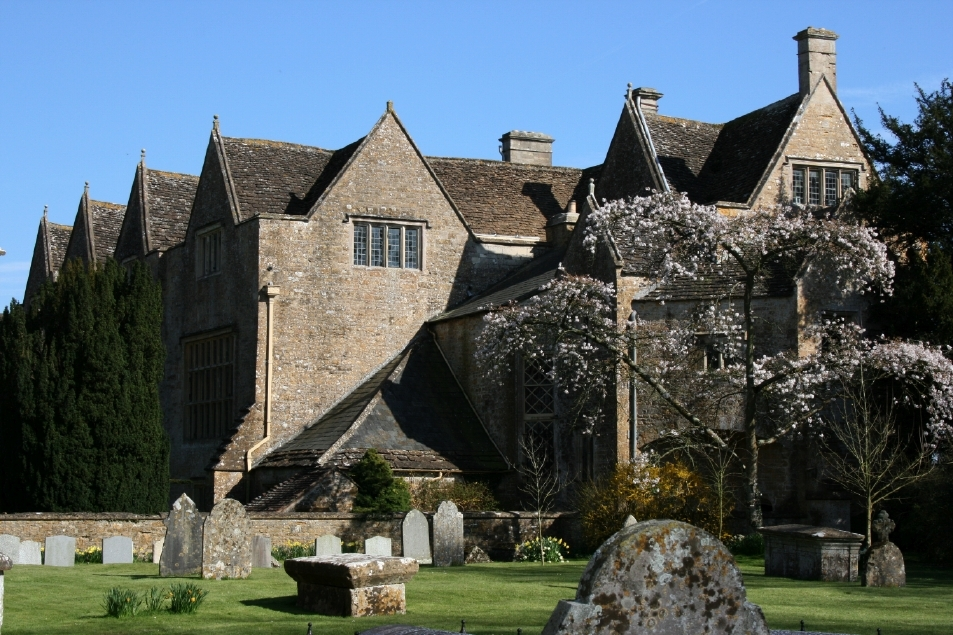
North Cadbury Court

Sir Francis Hastings (c. 1546–1610) was an English Puritan politician.

Hastings was a skilful parliamentarian, and excellent committee man, and schooled in the importance of religion in political discourse. A published author, highly intelligent, Hastings showed he was a dutiful, and obedient servant of the Crown. Opinionated, dogmatic and determined, Hastings could oppose as a matter of principle, but would never betray the monarch. Hastings was a prolific and hard-working MP requested for many offices, and never out of favour. Despite being from a noble family he thrived on the cut and thrust of Commons procedure; perspicacious, insightful he tried to achieve a balance of power.

== Early life ==
He was the fifth and youngest son of the 2nd Earl of Huntingdon and Catherine, daughter of Henry, 1st Baron Montagu. His older brothers were Henry Hastings, 3rd Earl of Huntingdon and George Hastings, 4th Earl of Huntingdon. Francis was educated Magdalen College, Oxford before being admitted to Grays Inn; he was called to the bar in 1574.

== Career ==
While a man-at-the-bar he was appointed a Justice of the Peace in his father's county of Leicestershire, where he lived at Market Bosworth. Already set for a career in public life he was made High Sheriff of Leicestershire for 1571–72, shortly after his first election as Member of Parliament (MP) for Leicestershire (1571, 1584–1587 and 1597–98).

He exchanged his Market Bosworth property for his older brother's lands in Somerset and built North Cadbury Court in North Cadbury, Somerset in 1581. Five years later he exchanged seats with his brother and was elected for Somerset (1588–1593 and 1604–1611) and Bridgwater (1601). He also served as High Sheriff of Leicestershire a second time for 1581-82 and was knighted around 1589.

He had married in 1569 Lady Maud Vernon (née Longford), daughter of Sir Ralph Longford and widow of Sir George Vernon. When she died on 14 June 1596, he moved back to the Midlands. But realising his father dominance there he married again, and returned to the west country. Mary Watkins inherited property at Holwell, in the vale of Blackmore, on the borders with Devon. He served as MP for Bridgwater, but when Queen Elizabeth died, he had already proven his Protestant credentials. An avowed and committed Puritan, he nevertheless wrote a treatise against papistry Discourse of Predestination (1598) stamping his Calvinist intellectual qualities for the new King James to read. His idea about The Watch Word was meant to prove to His Majesty at the Hampton Court Conference that the Protestant was ever-vigilant about the threats to England's security. But he was astute enough to leave room for Catholics to remain loyal to the Crown.

== Parliamentary activity ==
His critics thought his writings verged on heretical nonconformity trying to be "cunning" dividing the church of Protestants in the doctrine of faith. Hastings was conscious of the dangers of a House divided against itself. But being biblical puritan he was evangelical about the Scriptures, promoting it as "The word of Truth". Holiness was his own watchword on conduct in public life. Hastings saw the Commons as an apt place for religious debate, while maintaining the dignity of the 'Sovereign Magistrate'.

Although passed over for the post of Speaker, he was always a leading member of the Commons, receiving Sir Robert Wroth's petition of grievances, sitting as a judge at the Conference of 1604, using his own considerable personal powers to further the authority of the House. He organized the Commons own Officers, expanded its privilege, and protected other members from imprisonment for debt. Yet he was still a servant of the Crown. In 1604 he drafted a bill "against Puritans" which he tried to define to include Catholicism. This was not the legal definition so he sought the advice of Thomas Egerton, Lord Chancellor. Hastings was convinced that the procedure demanded the Conference be suspended while the "King of kings" gained entrance to the House.

When Archbishop Bancroft refused to co-operate with the Commons self-appointed political operator, Hastings decided he "did not prejudice the liberties of the church", and immediately resorted to legal precedents to justify his opinions. He was again convinced that the Commons could demand the church abandon "ceremonials" for Puritanism. But when Bancroft proved conciliatory from the Lords, he agreed to drop the matter. His eclectic and conciliatory style continued when the Catholic peer Lord William Howard was allowed to retain his peerage, while at the same time promoting a bill against Recusants on 25 June 1604. Hastings got in trouble with the king when he persuaded the Commons and new Chancellor of Exchequer, Sir George Home to sound out a new Subsidy. In the event supply debate rejected the motion forcing Hastings to apologise to the King.

Hastings was a skilful, diplomatic courtier-politician. He lived in an aristocratic world in which he wished oblige the Crown, so he was summoned to the privy council to answer for Northamptonshire ministers who had refused to subscribe to the 1604 Canons. The King's Council chastised the "mutinous, seditious, malicious, factious ... " petitions from Somerset. Hastings was dismissed from his county offices with a rebuke. Needed in Westminster, he was required to address the penal laws, the day after 5 November 1605. He was admirably quick to respond to the crisis, writing immediately to Cecil urging authorisation for Secretary Herbert to take "timely and severe proceeding against Jesuits," thus also reinforcing the conformity to the Canons in a new bill. The Privy Council named him the next after them and first in the House.

Handling other MPs, Sir Francis proved adept and subtle. When Sir William Strode suggested involving the bishops in about depriving ministers form livings and benefices, Hastings steered a course towards inclusion. More Puritans would be needed to staff the parish churches, so embrace Presbyterianism and the innovation of Conventicles. The real threat posed was by Catholic France and Spain, the Society of Jesuits who must not be allowed to "settle teaching" in England. MPs were engrossed enough to pass a third reading on 2 April 1606. Hastings upheld the Sabbath like a Sabbatarian encouraging attendance at church. This did not mean he was not tolerant of Catholicism. However the King's Speaker forced the bill to be dropped; toleration was a major issue for Hastings, who was furious. As Chairman of the Committee of Privileges he held enormous power over procedure; nevertheless he was humiliated, and had to make a grovelling apology to King James. One of the puritan petitioners was Thomas Felton, later the murderer of the Duke of Buckingham, who was obliged in his demand that Jesuits be punished. Hastings pushed for more recusancy prosecutions on the word of William Uvedale, a paid spy and informer.

By June 1607, Hastings seems to have become old and worn down by Commons refusal to award the king supply. Sir Thomas Beaumont advised him to wait for the king's approval of the Great Contract, satisfaction of grievances. On 21 May 1610 The King demanded the right to levy tax as of right. Hastings was horrified of the displacement of the Commons constitutional convention, "His Majesty then hath a power in all our properties."

== Bibliography ==
- Letters of Sir Francis Hastings 1574-1609 ed. C Cross (Somerset Record Society, lxix)
- F. Hastings, Apologie or Defence of the Watchword (1600)
- Oxford DNB (2004)
- Proceedings in Parliaments of Elizabeth ed. T.E. Hartley, 3 vols.
- J. E. Neale, The Elizabethan House of Commons (London: Jonathan Cape, 1949)
- Commons Journals(CJ) vol.1,
- Willis, Browne (1750). Notitia Parliamentaria, Part II: A Series or Lists of the Representatives in the several Parliaments held from the Reformation 1541, to the Restoration 1660 ... London. pp. 82, 102, 112, 123, 130, 132, 140, 151, 162, 172.
- Winwood's Memorials ed. Edward Sawyer, 2 vols.
- C Cross, The Puritan Earl: Life and Times of Sir Francis Hastings,
- D. Newton, 'Sir Francis Hastings and the religious education of James VI and I', House Journal (HJ), xli
