= Gregory Donhault =

English politician

Gregory Donhault (ca. 1555 – 4 April 1614), of London, was an English politician.

He was a member of the Parliament of England for East Looe in 1593, Saltash in 1597, and Dunheved in 1601.
