= John Parker (died 1617) =

English soldier and politician

Sir John Parker (c. 1548 – 15 October 1617) was an English soldier and politician.

He was the son of Thomas Parker (died 1580) of Ratton, Willingdon, Sussex. He spent time on military service in Ireland before being posted to the Berwick garrison.

He was a Member of Parliament for Hastings in 1589; Truro, Cornwall in 1593; Dunheved in 1601; and East Looe in 1604.

He was a gentleman pensioner by 1587–1603, constable of Leominster castle in 1589, bailiff of Longney manor, Yorkshire in 1589, keeper of Falmouth Castle from 1603 to his death and captain of Pendennis Castle from 1603 to his death. He was knighted in 1603.

He died unmarried.
