= Edward Phelips (speaker) =

English lawyer and politician (died 1614)

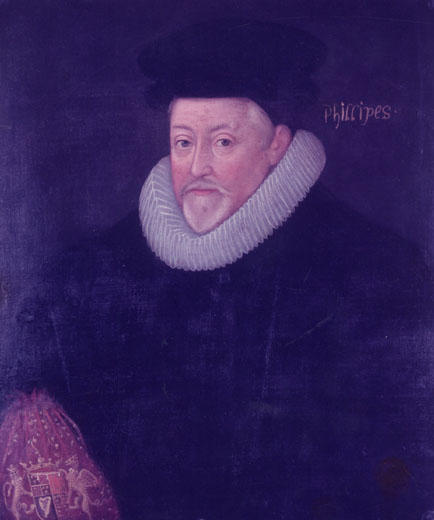
Sir Edward Phelips, by unknown artist

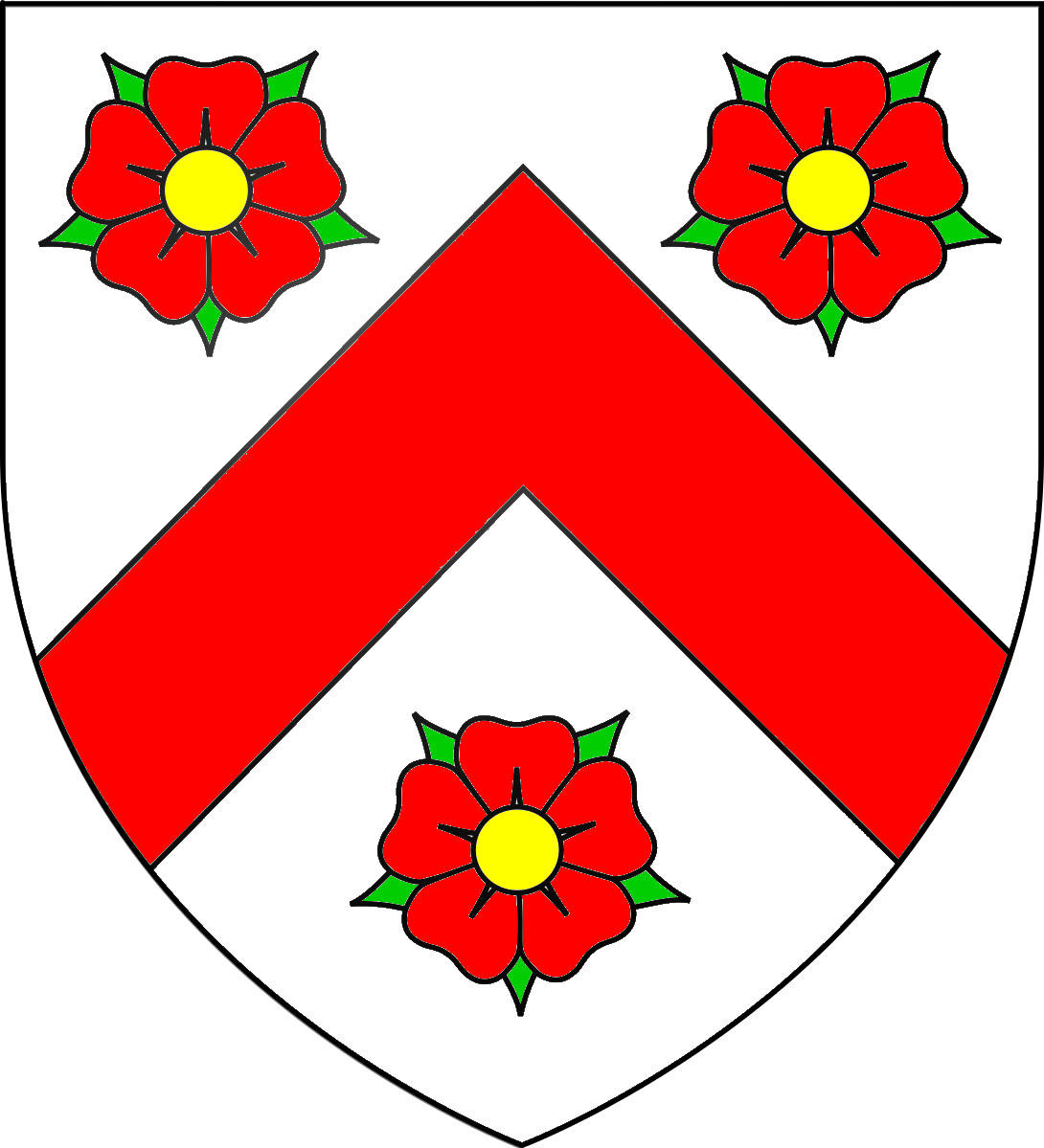
Arms of Phelips: Argent, a chevron gules between three roses of the second seeded or barbed vert

Sir Edward Phelips (c. 1555/1560 – 1614) was an English lawyer and politician, the Speaker of the English House of Commons from 1604 until 1611, and subsequently Master of the Rolls from 1611 until his death in 1614. He was an elected MP from 1584, and in 1588, following a successful career as a lawyer, he commissioned Montacute House to be built as a country house for himself and his family on the family estate in Somerset. He was knighted in 1603 and one of his major roles was as the opening prosecutor during the trial of the Gunpowder Plotters.

He married Margaret Newdigate, and his son, Sir Robert Phelips, inherited his land and property.

== Life ==
He was fourth and youngest son of Thomas Phelips (1500–1588) of Montacute, Somerset, by his wife Elizabeth (d. 1598), daughter of John Smythe of Long Ashton in the same county. His father stood godfather to Thomas Coryate. Edward was born about 1560: according to Coryate, who refers to him as a patron, he was about 53 in 1613.

He joined the Middle Temple, where he was autumn reader in 1596. In 1584 he entered parliament as MP for Bere Alston, followed by terms as MP for Weymouth and Melcombe Regis in 1586, Penryn in 1593 and Andover in 1597. In 1601 he was elected knight of the shire for Somerset. On 11 February 1603 he was named serjeant-at-law, but Queen Elizabeth died, and he did not proceed to his degree until the following reign. On 17 May he was made king's serjeant and knighted. In November he took part in the trial of Sir Walter Raleigh. He was re-elected to parliament for Somerset on 11 February 1604, and on 19 March was elected speaker. According to Sir Julius Cæsar, he was the best speaker for some decades, and although long-winded, did expedite some business for the king.

On 17 July 1604 he was granted the office of justice of common pleas in the county palatine of Lancaster. In this capacity he was very active against Catholics; he is said to have declared that, as the law stood, all who were present when mass was celebrated were guilty of felony. He was one of those appointed to examine the Gunpowder Plot conspirators, and in January 1606 opened the indictment against Guy Fawkes. He was also chancellor to Henry Frederick, Prince of Wales. On 2 December 1608 he was granted the reversion of the Master of the Rolls, but did not succeed to the office until January 1611.

In 1613 he was involved in the celebrations at the wedding of Princess Elizabeth and Frederick V of the Palatinate. He helped organise The Memorable Masque of the Middle Temple and Lincoln's Inn and paid Inigo Jones £110 for the scenery and stage-works. he was appointed ranger of all royal forests, parks, and chases in England.

Besides his London house in Chancery Lane, and another at Wanstead, Essex, where he entertained the king, Phelips built a large mansion in Somerset, Montacute House, which is still standing, and in the possession of the National Trust. He died on 11 September 1614, having married, firstly, Margaret (d. 28 April 1590), daughter of Robert Newdegate of Newdegate, Surrey, by whom he had two sons, Sir Robert and Francis; secondly, Elizabeth (d. 26 March 1638), daughter of Thomas Pigott of Doddershall House, Buckinghamshire, and niece of Welsh judge John Lloyd.

== Parliamentary convention ==
1. the 2d of April, 1604, rule. That a question being once made, and carried in the affirmative or negative, cannot be questioned again, but must stand as judgment of the House.
2. ...
3. ...
4. On the 1st of June, 1610, agreed for a rule. That no Bill of the same substance can be brought in the same session.

— John Hatsell, Rules of Proceeding, in Precedents of proceedings in the House of Commons: with observations

It was under Phelips that the "1604 rule" was established: a parliamentary convention that "no motion can be put by the Government to the Commons twice in the same parliamentary session if the wording is exactly or substantially the same." The rule was invoked 12 times between 1604 and 1920; and was also invoked in 2019 in relation to the Brexit withdrawal agreement.

Parliament of England
Preceded by Sir John Croke	Speaker of the House of Commons; 1603–1611	Succeeded by Sir Randolph Crewe
Legal offices
Preceded by Edward Bruce	Master of the Rolls; 1611–1614	Succeeded by Sir Julius Caesar
Honorary titles
Preceded by Sir John Popham	Custos Rotulorum of Somerset; 1608 – 1614	Succeeded by James Ley, 1st Baron Ley
