= Ludlow (disambiguation) =

Ludlow is a town in Shropshire, England.

Ludlow may refer to:

== Arts and entertainment ==
- Ludlow, a novel by David Mason about the Ludlow Massacre

== Businesses and organisations ==
=== Businesses ===
- Fisher and Ludlow, British car body manufacturing company
- Ludlows, an English bus company, bought out in 2007

=== Schools ===
- Ludlow College, Shropshire, England
- Fairfield Ludlowe High School, Fairfield, Connecticut
- Roger Ludlowe Middle School, Fairfield, Connecticut
- Ludlow High School, Ludlow, Massachusetts
- Ludlow Junior School, Woolston, Southampton, England

== People ==
- Ludlow (name), including a list of people and fictional characters with the surname and given name
- Earl Ludlow, a title in the Peerage of Ireland
- Baron Ludlow, a title in the Peerage of Ireland and in the Peerage of the United Kingdom

== Places ==
=== Australia ===
- Ludlow, Western Australia

=== Canada ===
- Ludlow Parish, New Brunswick
  - Ludlow, New Brunswick

=== United Kingdom ===
- Ludlow Rural District, Shropshire, England
- Ludlow (UK Parliament constituency)

=== United States ===
- Ludlow, California
- Ludlow, Colorado
- Ludlow, Illinois
- Ludlow, Iowa
- Ludlow, Kentucky
- Ludlow, Maine
- Ludlow, Massachusetts
- Ludlow, Mississippi
- Ludlow, Missouri
- Ludlow, Pennsylvania
- Ludlow, Philadelphia, neighborhood
- Ludlow, South Dakota
- Ludlow (town), Vermont
  - Ludlow (village), Vermont
- Ludlow Creek, a stream in Ohio
- Ludlow Falls, Ohio
- Ludlow Street, Manhattan, New York City
- Ludlow Township, Allamakee County, Iowa
- Ludlow Township, Champaign County, Illinois
- Ludlow Township, Washington County, Ohio
- Port Ludlow, Washington

== Sports ==
- Ludlow Golf Club, a golf club located near Ludlow, Shropshire, England
- Ludlow Lusitano, a former American soccer club based in Ludlow, Massachusetts
- Ludlow Racecourse, a thoroughbred horse racing venue located near Ludlow, Shropshire
- Ludlow Town F.C., a football club based in Ludlow, Shropshire

== Transportation and naval ==
- Ludlow (Metro-North station), railroad station serving Ludlow Park, Yonkers, New York, US
- Ludlow railway station, English railway station
- USS Ludlow, the name of several American ships
- HMS Ludlow, the name of two British ships

== Geology ==
- Ludlow Epoch, part of the Silurian period in the geologic time scale
  - Ludlow Group, rocks deposited during the Ludlow period of the Silurian in Great Britain

== See also ==
- Ludlow Amendment, a proposed amendment to the US Constitution
- Ludlow Castle, in Ludlow, Shropshire, England
- Ludlow Castle, Delhi, demolished residency in Delhi, India
- Ludlow Garage, music venue in Cincinnati, Ohio, U.S.
- Ludlow Hospital, serving Ludlow, Shropshire, England
- Ludlow Massacre, during the Colorado Coalfield War in 1914
  - "Ludlow Massacre" (song)
  - Ludlow Monument
- Ludlow Street Jail, former American federal prison in New York City
- Ludlow Typograph, a hot metal typesetting system used in letterpress printing
- Ludlow style wall box, a British post box type
- Ludlow's fulvetta, a species of bird in Bhutan, China, India, Myanmar, and Nepal
- Bhutanitis ludlowi, a swallowtail butterfly commonly known as Ludlow's Bhutan swallowtail
- Bishop of Ludlow, a Church of England bishop
- My Lady Ludlow, a novella by Elizabeth Gaskell from 1858
- Fitz Hugh Ludlow Memorial Library, an American library named after Fitz Hugh Ludlow
- Pepperman House, also known as Ludlow House, historic house in Montgomery, Alabama
