= Ludlow (name) =

Ludlow is a name. People and fictional characters with the surname and given name include:

== People with the surname ==
- Augustus Ludlow, officer in the United States Navy during the War of 1812
- Augustus Ludlow, 2nd Earl Ludlow (1755–1811), British peer (see Earl Ludlow)
- Baron Ludlow, extinct titles in the Peerage of Ireland and the Peerage of the United Kingdom
- Caroline Ludlow (1947–2014), British judge
- Charles Ludlow (1790–1839), officer in the United States Navy during the War of 1812
- Clara Southmayd Ludlow (1852–1924), American medical entomologist
- Conrad Ludlow, American dancer and professor of dance
- Daniel Ludlow Kuri (born 1961), Mexican politician
- Earl Ludlow, extinct title in the Peerage of Ireland
- Edgar Ludlow-Hewitt (1886–1973), Royal Air Force commander in World War I
- Edward Hunter Ludlow (1810-1884), American physician and real estate broker
- Edmund Ludlow (c. 1617–1692), English parliamentarian, exiled in Switzerland
- Fitz Hugh Ludlow, American author, journalist, and explorer
- Frank Ludlow (1885–1972), English botanist, ornithologist, and World War I officer
- Frederick Ludlow (1796–?), early colonial settler in Western Australia
- George Ludlow, 3rd Earl Ludlow (1758–1842), British soldier
- George C. Ludlow (1830–1900), Governor of the American state of New Jersey
- George Duncan Ludlow (1734–1808), Loyalist and lawyer who became the first Chief Justice of New Brunswick
- Henry G. Ludlow (1797–1867), American minister and abolitionist, father of Fitzhugh
- Israel Ludlow (1765–1804), American pioneer surveyor of Northwest Territory
- Jayne Ludlow (born 1979), Welsh football player
- John de Ludlow, English medieval university chancellor
- John Malcolm Forbes Ludlow (1821–1911), British lawyer, public official and Christian socialist
- Louis Ludlow (1873–1950), American congressman from Indiana
- Martin Ludlow (born 1964), American politician from Los Angeles, California
- Morwenna Ludlow, British historian and theologian
- Peter Ludlow, 1st Earl Ludlow (1730–1803), British politician
- Peter Ludlow, American linguist and philosopher
- Roger Ludlow (1590–1664), English lawyer, magistrate and military officer; one of the founders of the colony of Connecticut
- Samuel Ludlow (judge) (1792–1880), American jurist from the state of New York
- Travis Ludlow (born 2003), English aviator
- William H. Ludlow (1821–1890), American politician, speaker of the New York State Assembly, father of William
- William Ludlow (1843–1901), American soldier and explorer of Yellowstone, son of William H.
- Willis Ludlow (1854–1938), American politician

== People with the given name ==
- Ludlow Griscom (1890–1959), American ornithologist
- Ludlow Moody (1892–1981), Jamaican medical doctor and political leader
- Ludlow Ogden Smith, Philadelphia socialite who married Katharine Hepburn

== Fictional characters with the name ==
- Donna Ludlow, English soap opera character
- Kelly Ludlow, American television character
- Ludlow Porch, American radio personality played by Bobby Crawford Hanson
- Maeve Ludlow, British soap opera character
- Peter Ludlow, the main antagonist in The Lost World: Jurassic Park
- Ludlow Lamonsoff, a major protagonist of the 2015 film Pixels

== See also ==
- Ludlow (disambiguation)
  - Ludlow, a town in England
- Earl Ludlow and Baron Ludlow, titles of peerages in Ireland and the UK
