= Heywood House =

Country house in Heywood, Wiltshire, England

- Interactive map of the Heywood House area

General information
- Type: English country house
- Classification: Grade II*
- Location: Heywood, Wiltshire, United Kingdom
- Coordinates: 51.2803°N 2.1793°W
- Opened: 1839

Website
- heywoodhouse.com

Heywood House is a Grade II* listed English country house at Heywood, near Westbury, Wiltshire.

Its site, to the east of the present A350 road and within sight of it, had an early 17th-century house on it until 1837. This was demolished by the last owner, H. G. G. Ludlow, who built the present house, completed in 1839, designed by the architect Harvey Eginton of Worcester with many Jacobean features.

== History ==
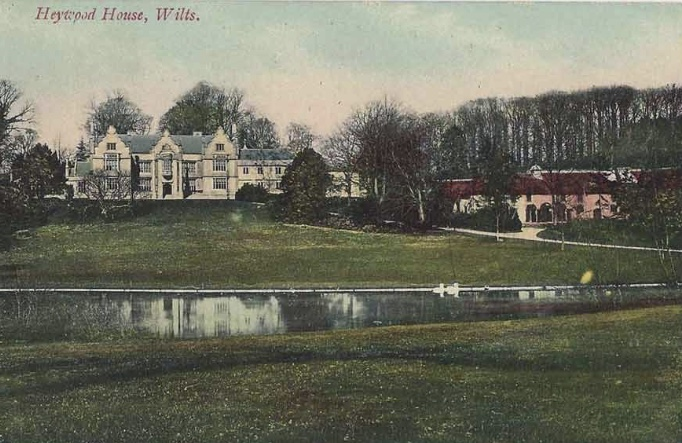
Heywood House, about 1904

In the early 17th century, James Ley, one of the two members of parliament for Westbury, and later Lord High Treasurer and Earl of Marlborough, and his brother Matthew Ley, also a Westbury member of parliament, acquired land at Heywood, then part of Westbury, and James Ley built a house there. His grandson James Ley, 3rd Earl of Marlborough, a Royal Navy officer, sold most of his Wiltshire property, including the house then standing, soon after inheriting it in 1638. In 1700, the house, then called Heywood Place, was bought by Thomas Phipps, of a family of Westbury cloth merchants, who had made a fortune in the City of London by trading with the East Indies and New England. His son William Phipps, after retiring as Governor of Bombay, died at the house in 1748.

Later in the eighteenth century, the property came into the Ludlow family, and in 1837 Henry Gaisford Gibbs Ludlow demolished the old Heywood House and had the present one built on the same site.

H. G. G. Ludlow died in 1876, and the house and its estate passed to his nephew Henry Charles Lopes, a younger son of Sir Ralph Lopes and his wife Susan Gibbs Ludlow. He was created Baron Ludlow in 1897; the title became extinct in 1922 on the death of his son, Henry Lopes, 2nd Baron Ludlow. Since then the house has had several owners and for a time housed a regional headquarters of the National Trust; in 1987 it was designated as Grade II* listed. In 2015, the house was divided into offices.

== Architecture ==
H. G. G. Ludlow's architect was Harvey Eginton of Worcester.

The house is built of limestone ashlar blocks, with a Welsh slate roof and with octagonal ashlar chimneystacks. The style is Jacobean, with an E-plan footprint. There are two main storeys, and a third of attics, and five front windows across the first floor. In the centre of the front elevation is a two-storey porch, with Tudor-arched openings and hoodmoulds, with a first floor oriel window and an open parapet, and a large shaped front-facing gable, one of three. Above the porch are free-standing octagonal minarets and a square clock tower. The bays to each side of the porch have six-light casements on both principal floors, with mullions and transoms. The two wings have canted bays with four-light mullion and transom windows and open parapets.

Inside the porch, a plaque has details of the building of the house. The rooms inside still have many high-quality original fittings. A large central hall has a stone chimneypiece in a 17th-century style, with a strapwork overmantel and Doric columns. The stair hall is to the rear of the building, with open-well stairs in a Queen Anne style with barley sugar balusters. There are several decorated plaster ceilings. The dining room has 17th-century panelling which may be from the earlier building. Most of the doors are eight-panelled, in moulded architraves, but some are Tudor-arched with cusped panels. An attached conservatory is built in timber and cast-iron on an ashlar plinth.
