= Henry Whitaker (MP for Westbury) =

English politician

Henry Whitaker (c. 1549 - 1589) was an English politician.

He was a member (MP) of the parliament of England for Westbury in 1586.

Parliament of England
Preceded by William Brouncker; Edward Midwinter	Member of Parliament for Westbury; 1586–1588; With: Robert Baynard	Succeeded by Sir Henry Fanshawe; John Bennett
