= General Ludlow =

General Ludlow may refer to:

- George Ludlow, 3rd Earl Ludlow (1758–1842), British Army general
- William Ludlow (1843–1901), U.S. Army major general

== See also ==
- Edgar Ludlow-Hewitt (1886–1973), Royal Air Force Air Chief Marshall
