= USS Ludlow =

USS Ludlow has been the name of three ships in the United States Navy. The second and third ships were named for Lieutenant Augustus C. Ludlow.

- USS Ludlow (1808), a row galley of about 40 tons. Was built on Lake Champlain in 1808. She participated in the Battle of Plattsburgh, which ended on 11 September 1814.
- USS Ludlow (DD-112), a Wickes-class destroyer who served from 1918 until 1930. It was scrapped and sold on 10 March 1931.
- USS Ludlow (DD-438), a Gleaves-class destroyer who served for America from 1941 until 1951. Transferred to Greece on 22 January 1951, and broken up for scrap in 1972.
