= Henry Whitaker =

Henry Whitaker may refer to:

- Henry Whitaker (died 1746) (1686–1746), English politician
- Henry Whitaker (MP for Shaftesbury) (c. 1622–1695), English lawyer and politician
- Henry Whitaker (MP for Westbury) (c. 1549–1589), English politician
- Henry C. Whitaker (born 1978), American legal scholar
