= Henry Lopes, 1st Baron Ludlow =

British judge and Conservative Party politician

The Right Honourable The Lord Ludlow PC
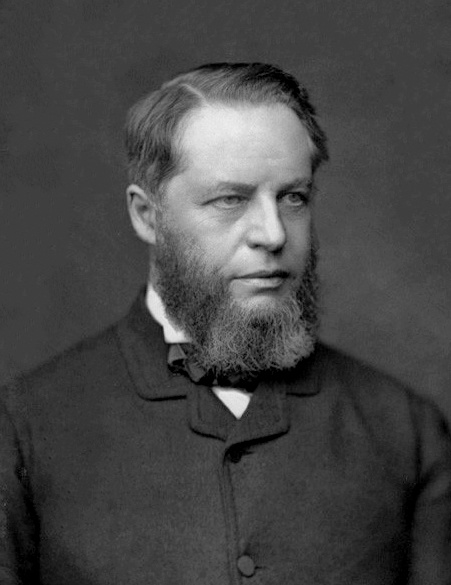

Lord Justice of Appeal
- In office 1 December 1885 – 27 October 1897
- Preceded by: Sir Richard Baggallay
- Succeeded by: Sir Roland Vaughan Williams

Justice of the High Court
- In office 1876–1885

Personal details
- Born: Henry Charles Lopes; 3 October 1828
- Died: 25 December 1899 (aged 71)
- Education: Winchester College; Balliol College, Oxford

Henry Charles Lopes, 1st Baron Ludlow, PC (3 October 1828 – 25 December 1899), in his early years known by the surname of Franco, was a British judge and Conservative Party politician.

== Background and education ==
Ludlow was a younger son of Sir Ralph Lopes, 2nd Baronet, born Ralph Franco, and the uncle of Henry Lopes, 1st Baron Roborough. He was educated at Winchester and Balliol College, Oxford, and was called to the Bar, Inner Temple, in 1852.

== Political and legal career ==
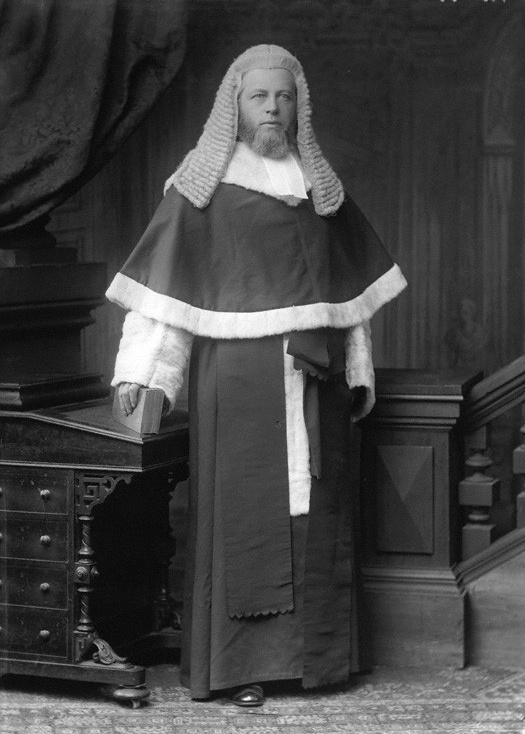
Lord Ludlow in 1883

Ludlow sat as Member of Parliament for Launceston from 1868 to 1874 and for Frome from 1874 to 1876. He was also a Recorder of Exeter from 1867 to 1876 and became a Queen's Counsel in 1868.

In 1876, he was appointed a Justice of the Common Pleas Division of the High Court of Justice, a post he held until 1880, and then served as a Lord Justice of Appeal from 1885 to 1897.

Lopes was knighted in 1876 and sworn of the Privy Council in 1885. In 1897, he was raised to the peerage as Baron Ludlow, of Heywood in the County of Wiltshire; his country house was Heywood House, near Westbury.

=== Judgments ===
- Learoyd v Whiteley [1887] UKHL 1, (1887) 12 AC 727 (Lopes concurring with Cotton LJ and Lindley LJ in the Court of Appeal) – the House of Lords affirmed the Court of Appeal decision in this English trusts law case concerning the duty of care owed by a trustee when exercising the power of investment.
- British South Africa Co v Companhia de Moçambique [1893] AC 602 (Lopes sitting in the Court of Appeal) – the House of Lords overturned Lopes' Court of Appeal decision and by so doing established the Mozambique rule, a common law rule in private international law that renders actions relating to title in foreign land, the right to possession of foreign land, and trespass to foreign land non-justiciable in common law jurisdictions.
- The Satanita [1897] AC 59 – Contract law case atypical of the conventional offer & acceptance pattern seen in English law. Lopes decision at appeal affirmed by the House of Lords.

== Family ==
Lord Ludlow married Cordelia Lucy, daughter of Erving Clark, in 1854. They had one son and five daughters.

- Hon. Susan Ludlow Cordelia Lopes (30 Jun 1858 – 20 Apr 1938), who married Archibald Bence-Jones (1857–1937). They had one daughter.
- Hon. Cordelia Lucy Lopes (1861 – 18 Apr 1945). She married Sir John Alexander Hanham, 9th Baronet. They had two sons, and a daughter.
- Hon. Ethel Maud Lopes (27 Oct 1863 – 11 Dec 1943). Unmarried.
- Henry Ludlow Lopes, 2nd Baron Ludlow (30 Sep 1865 – 8 Nov 1922). Married twice, but died without issue.
- Hon. Ernestine Frances Lopes (13 Aug 1868 – 2 Sep 1938). She married George Lopes (28 Apr 1857 – 3 Oct 1909) in 1897.
- Hon. Bertha Susan Lopes (1869 – 6 May 1926), married Charles Bathurst, 1st Viscount Bledisloe. They had two sons, and a daughter.

Cordelia died in 1891. Lord Ludlow survived her by eight years and died in December 1899, aged 71. He was succeeded by his only son, Henry.

Parliament of the United Kingdom
Preceded by Alexander Henry Campbell	Member of Parliament for Launceston; 1868–1874	Succeeded by James Henry Deakin
Preceded by Thomas Hughes	Member of Parliament for Frome; 1874–1876	Succeeded by Henry Samuelson
Peerage of the United Kingdom
New creation	Baron Ludlow; 1897–1899	Succeeded by Henry Lopes
