= Alexander Chocke =

Alexander Chocke may refer to:

- Alexander Chocke of Avington (by 1566–1607), English politician who represented the Parliamentary constituency of Westbury from 1605 to 1607
- Alexander Chocke of Shalbourne (1594–1625), English politician who represented the Parliamentary constituency of Ludgershall from 1621 to 1622
