= Luplow =

Luplow is a surname. Notable people with the surname include:

- Al Luplow (1939–2017), American baseball player
- Jordan Luplow (born 1993), American baseball player, great-nephew of Al

== See also ==
- Ludlow (name)
