= Alexander Chocke of Avington =

English politician

Alexander Chocke (by 1566–1607), of Avington, Berkshire was an English politician who sat in the House of Commons from 17 October 1605 until his death in 1607.

== Biography ==
Chocke was from a family established in Somerset since the early 15th century. He was elected to Parliament on 17 October 1605 in a by-election at Westbury, Wiltshire, caused by its vindication by Sir James Ley who had been appointed chief justice of Ireland. Chocke held the seat until his death on 29 July 1607.

== Notes ==
Parliament of England
Preceded by James Ley	Member of Parliament for Westbury; 1605–1607; With: Matthew Ley	Succeeded by Henry Ley
