= Hanham (disambiguation) =

Hanham is a civil parish in Gloucestershire, England.

Hanham may also refer to:

- Hanham baronets

== People with the surname ==
- James Hanham (1840–1923), American chess player
- Joan Hanham, Baroness Hanham (1939–2025), British politician
