= Henry Lopes, 2nd Baron Ludlow =

British barrister and politician (1865–1922)

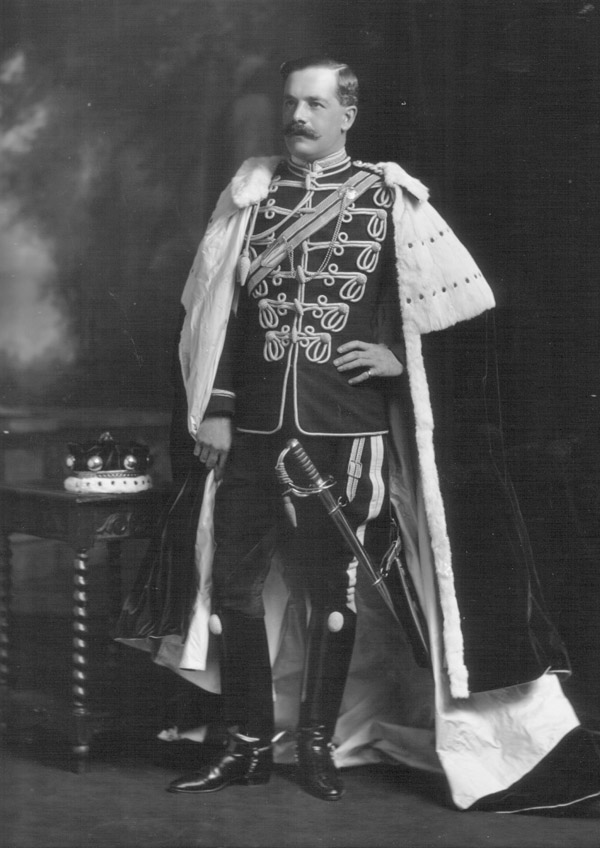
- 2nd Baron Ludlow, photographed 23 October 1902

Member of the London County Council for Marylebone
- In office 1904-1907

Personal details
- Born: 30 September 1865
- Died: 8 November 1922 (aged 57)
- Spouse(s): Blanche Holden (m. 1903–1911) Alice Mankiewicz (m. 1919)
- Parent: Henry Lopes (father)
- Education: Balliol College, Oxford
- Military career
- Rank: Lieutenant
- Unit: Royal Wiltshire Yeomanry (Prince of Wales's Own Royal Regiment)

Henry Ludlow Lopes, 2nd Baron Ludlow (30 September 1865 – 8 November 1922), was a British barrister and for a short time a member of London County Council.

== Biography ==
Lopes was the only son of Henry Lopes, 1st Baron Ludlow, by Cordelia Lucy, daughter of Erving Clark, of Efford Manor, Plymouth. He was educated at Eton and Balliol College, Oxford, and was called to the Bar, Middle Temple, in 1890. In late 1899 he succeeded his father in the barony, and he took his seat in the House of Lords on 1 March 1900. The family seat was Heywood House, near Westbury in Wiltshire; Lord Ludlow was appointed a deputy lieutenant of Wiltshire in 1900. He became a member of the London County Council for Marylebone in 1904, a post he held until 1907.

He served in the Royal Wiltshire Yeomanry (Prince of Wales's Own Royal Regiment), where he was promoted to lieutenant on 26 March 1902. He later fought in the First World War as a staff captain.

Lord Ludlow was twice married. He married firstly in 1903 Blanche Holden, daughter of William Holden and former wife of Frederick Ellis, 7th Baron Howard de Walden. She died in April 1911. After her death he married in 1919 Alice Mankiewicz, daughter of James Mankiewicz and widow of Sir Julius Wernher. Both marriages were childless. Lord Ludlow died in November 1922, aged 57, and the barony became extinct. His second wife died in November 1945.

Peerage of the United Kingdom
| Preceded by Henry Charles Lopes | Baron Ludlow; 1899–1922 | Extinct |
