= USS Ludlow (DD-438) =

Gleaves-class destroyer

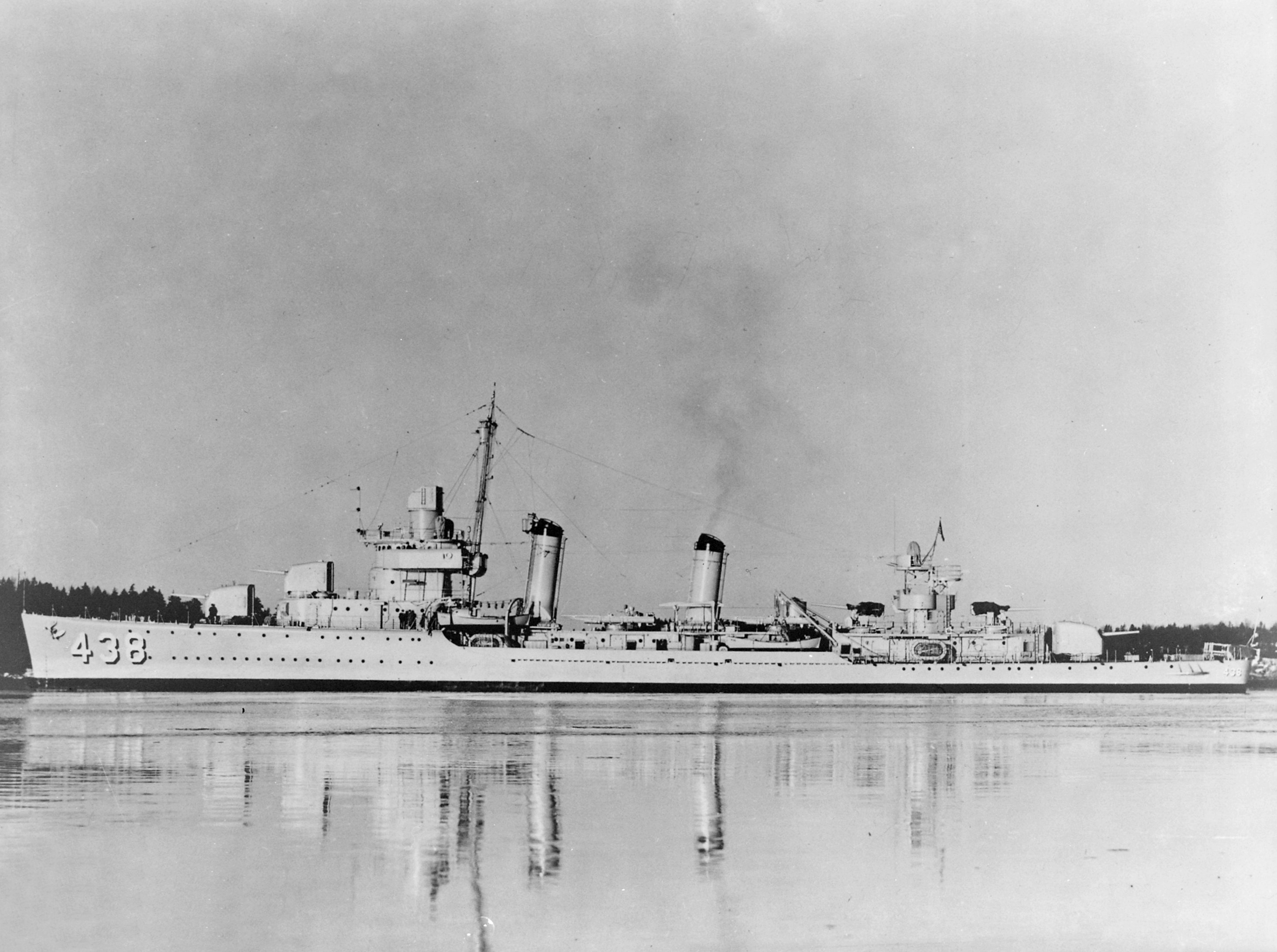
- USS Ludlow in March 1941

History

United States
- Name: USS Ludlow
- Namesake: Augustus C. Ludlow
- Builder: Bath Iron Works
- Laid down: 18 December 1939
- Launched: 11 November 1940
- Commissioned: 5 March 1941
- Decommissioned: 22 January 1951
- Stricken: 24 January 1951
- Identification: DD-438
- Fate: transferred to Greece, 22 January 1951

Greece
- Name: Doxa
- Acquired: 22 January 1951
- Stricken: 1972
- Identification: D20
- Fate: Broken up for scrap in 1972

General characteristics
- Class & type: Gleaves-class destroyer
- Displacement: 1,630 tons
- Length: 348 ft 3 in (106.15 m)
- Beam: 36 ft 1 in (11.00 m)
- Draft: 11 ft 10 in (3.61 m)
- Propulsion: 50,000 shp (37,000 kW); 4 boilers; 2 propellers
- Speed: 37.4 knots (69 km/h)
- Range: 6,500 nmi (12,000 km; 7,500 mi) at 12 kn (22 km/h; 14 mph)
- Complement: 16 officers, 260 enlisted
- Armament: 5 × 5 in (127 mm) DP guns, 6 × 0.5 in (12.7 mm) (12.7 mm) guns, 6 × 20 mm AA guns, 10 × 21 in (533 mm) torpedo tubes, 2 × depth charge tracks

USS Ludlow (DD-438), a Gleaves-class destroyer, was the third ship of the United States Navy to bear the name. The second and third Ludlow ships were named for Lieutenant Augustus C. Ludlow, second in command of USS Chesapeake. He was, like his captain, mortally wounded in their ship's engagement with HMS Shannon on 1 June 1813, and died at Halifax, Nova Scotia on 13 June.

Ludlow was laid down 18 December 1939 by Bath Iron Works, Bath, Maine. She was launched 11 November 1940, sponsored by Miss Frances Nicholson Chrystie, a descendant of Lieutenant Ludlow, and commissioned at Boston 5 March 1941.

== History ==
=== Commissioning ===
Ludlow commissioned at a time when the North Atlantic saw daily evidence of the struggle of British ships and planes against German U-boats. At this time, too, the vital Lend-Lease Act was destined to demonstrate America's concern for Great Britain's survival.

=== First tour ===
Having completed shakedown, Ludlow left Boston in October 1941 for Newfoundland and Iceland, convoying supplies ultimately destined for the British Isles. The 7 December attack on Pearl Harbor, and the declaration of war between Germany and the United States soon lengthened Ludlow's convoy runs to include the ports of Derry, Liverpool, Greenoch, and Freetown, South Africa.

=== Operation Torch ===
Assigned to Task Force 34 (TF 34) for the invasion of North Africa, Ludlow arrived off Cape Fedhala, French Morocco, late 7 November 1942. Shortly after the first wave of landing craft headed tor shore, Ludlow found herself engaging shore batteries, bombers, and a Vichy French naval force comprising a cruiser and two destroyers in the Naval Battle of Casablanca. A 6-inch shell struck her forward and straddling shots were falling close aboard when Augusta and Brooklyn — arrived and helped to dispose of the French ships.

=== Operation Husky ===
Ludlow returned to New York to repair battle damage, then conducted training off the coast of Maine before departing 14 January 1943 for the first of three convoy runs to Casablanca. After the third of these, in June, she remained in the Mediterranean Sea for the forthcoming invasion of Sicily. With the invasion forces on 10 July, Ludlow gave fire support off Licata and Porsa Empedocle. Daily enemy air attacks followed, and on 11 August she splashed her first airplane.

Participating in the invasion of Italy on 9 September, Ludlow led a section of the assault wave through a known minefield to the bloody landing at Salerno. She and her sister ships were warmly commended by the commanding general ashore for their effective close range fire support. She then served on convoy duty between Naples and Oran, until 11 January 1944. Returning to the beachheads, she covered Allied troops storming ashore at Anzio 22 January. This Joint American–British operation initially met little opposition, but later in the day the Germans struck with a fierce counterattack. Heavy air attacks marked the following days and, in less than a week, Ludlow splashed two bombers one fighter, and three rocket glider bombs. A 5-inch shell crashed through the torpedo director deck and the pilothouse, causing Ludlow to retire, but serious damage was averted when Chief Gunners Mate James D. Johnson located the hot, unexploded shell and managed to get it topside and overboard.

=== Antisubmarine duty ===
Ludlow repaired at New York, then trained along the Atlantic coast and returned to the Mediterranean 20 April for antisubmarine patrols. On 19 May, Ludlow and Niblack depth charged U-960 to the surface, where Ludlow's main battery sank her. After convoy alignments in the western Mediterranean, Ludlow steamed 11 August from Palermo for the invasion of southern France. Following preinvasion bombardment and beachhead screening off Fréjus, she joined Augusta from 25 to 30 August to help overcome the last resistance at Marseille. While on coastal fire support missions around Monaco, she encountered not only floating mines and E-boats, but also attacks by explosive-laden boats and human torpedoes. Ludlow captured three operators of these one man diving machines on 5 September after a series of depth charge attacks. Fire support, convoy and patrol duty continued until 23 January 1945, when Ludlow sailed for a month's plane guard duty off the west coast of Africa, returning to Boston on 28 February. In April she sailed to England to escort a convoy of LSTs stateside, then prepared for duty in the Pacific.

=== Convoys escorted ===
| Convoy | Escort Group | Dates | Notes |
|---|---|---|---|
| ON 28 | | 31 Oct-3 Nov 1941 | from Iceland to Newfoundland prior to US declaration of war |
| HX 158 | | 5-13 Nov 1941 | from Newfoundland to Iceland prior to US declaration of war |
| ON 37 | | 22-30 Nov 1941 | from Iceland to Newfoundland prior to US declaration of war |
| HX 184 | MOEF group A2 | 12–20 April 1942 | from Newfoundland to Northern Ireland |
| ON 91 | MOEF group A2 | 2–11 May 1942 | from Northern Ireland to Newfoundland |
| AT 17 | | 1–12 July 1942 | troopships from New York City to Firth of Clyde |

=== Pacific Theater ===
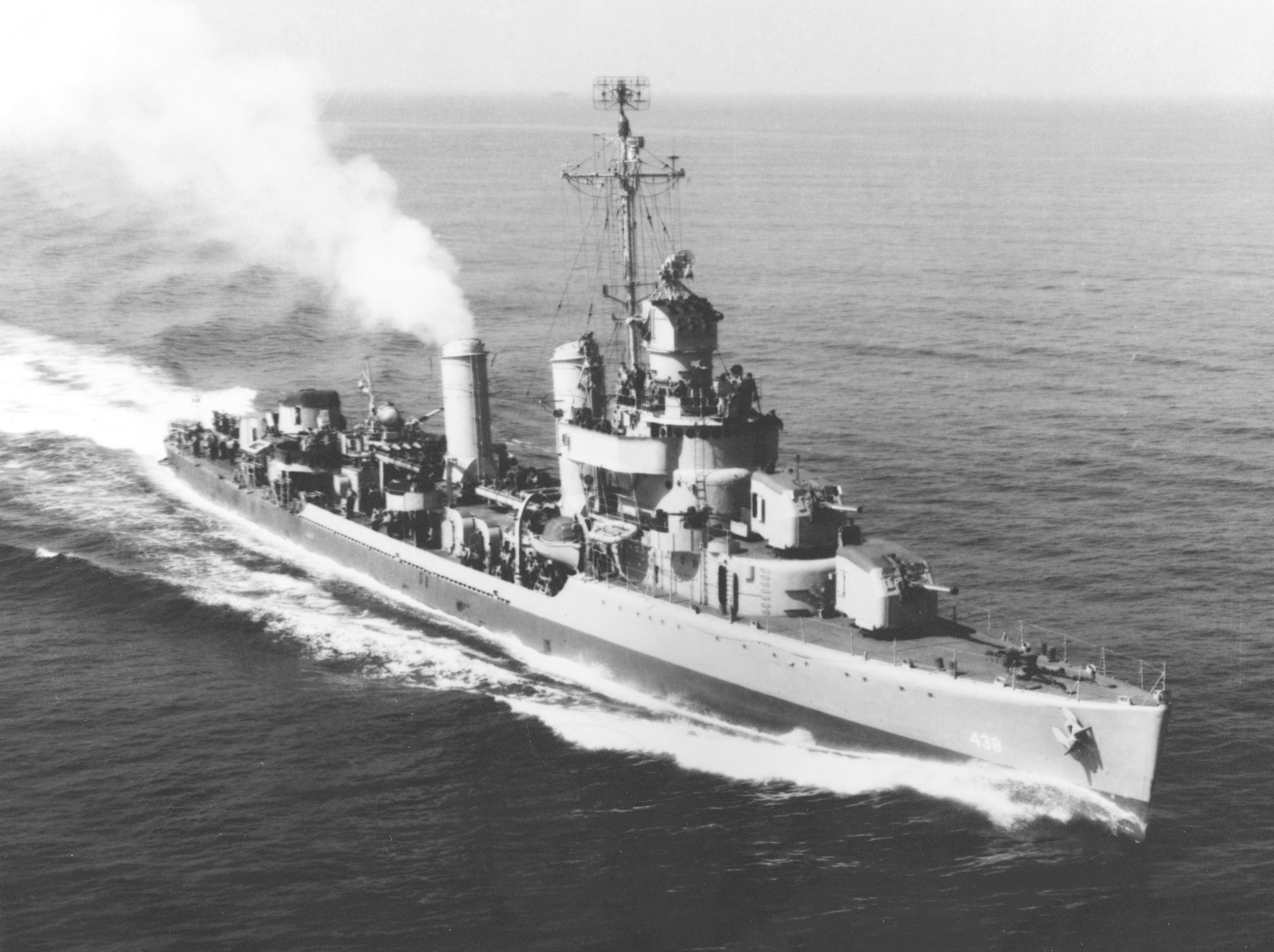
USS Ludlow underway in March 1945.

Transiting the Panama Canal 27 June, she reached Pearl Harbor 17 July and began training for operations with the fast carriers. The surrender of Japan, however diverted her to the job of escorting ships filled with occupation troops to the home islands of the defeated Empire. She departed Pearl Harbor 7 September and arrived at Wakayama, Japan on 27 September. Ludlow operated in the Far East until 3 November, then sailed for the Aleutians where she saw a brief period of "Magic Carpet" duty.

=== Decommissioning ===
Early in 1946, Ludlow was ordered back to the east coast, and on 20 May 1946 she was placed out of commission in reserve at Charleston, South Carolina. After this she was utilized for reserve training. She was placed in commission in reserve on 6 June 1950, and on 21 November of the same year she was placed on active status.

=== Greek service ===
Ludlow decommissioned 22 January 1951 and was transferred to the Royal Hellenic Navy where she was renamed Doxa (D20). The destroyer was broken up for scrap in 1972.

=== Awards ===
Ludlow was awarded the following:

- American Defense Service Medal (Fleet clasp)
- American Campaign Medal
- European-African-Middle Eastern Campaign Medal with six battle stars
- Asiatic-Pacific Campaign Medal
- World War II Victory Medal
- Navy Occupation Service Medal (Asia clasp)
