= 96th Regiment of Foot (1803) =

- Active: 1803–1818
- Country: United Kingdom
- Branch: British Army
- Type: Line Infantry
- Size: Two battalions

The 96th Regiment of Foot was the fourth light infantry regiment of the British Army to bear this name. It was originally created from the 2nd Battalion of the 52nd Regiment of Foot in 1803 at the start of the Napoleonic Wars. Initially a single battalion regiment, a second battalion was raised in 1804. The Regiment was based mainly in the Caribbean and on Jersey and renumbered as the 95th Regiment of Foot. Following the defeat of Napoleon, the British army was reduced in size, and the regiment was disbanded in 1818.

== History ==
The regiment was created as the 96th Regiment of Foot from the 2nd Battalion of the 52nd Regiment of Foot by an order issued on 10 January 1803:

"It being His Majesty's pleasure that from the 25th ult. the 2nd Battalion of the 52nd regiment should be numbered the 96th Regiment of Foot, I am commanded by the Commander-in-Chief to signify the same to you, and to desire that in consequence of this arrangement you will be pleased to give the necessary orders for posting a due proportion of the officers of the present battalions of the 52nd Regiment to the 96th Regiment."

Over the next month officers and grenadiers from the 52nd were allocated to the new Regiment. Regimental strength was also built up through recruitment activity across England, in places such as Nottingham and Norwich. The two regiments finally parted on 23 February 1803, and the 96th Foot marched to Chatham from where they soon sailed to Fermoy in Ireland.

From Fermoy the Regiment moved to Bandon and then Midleton - all in the county of Cork. A second battalion was raised in Wales in 1804. The 1st Battalion sailed from Midleton in February 1805 to the Caribbean, as part of the British military activity and occupation of several of the islands during the war.

The battalion was stationed in Barbados from March to July 1805. From there it moved to Antigua and served there until February 1808. Their next location was on St Croix, and the nearby island of St Thomas, now parts of the United States Virgin Islands but at the time part of the Danish West Indies (Denmark–Norway was allied with France from late 1807). From March 1808 to December 1814 it was based at Christiansted, St Croix, with a small outpost on St Thomas.

Following the Invasion of Martinique in 1809, the battalion, which had not participated in the invasion, was then stationed on the island from March 1815 until June 1816. With the final defeat of Napoleon in 1815 the island was handed back to France and the battalion returned to the United Kingdom.

The 2nd Battalion was based for a number of years on Jersey, where their Colonel in Chief, Sir George Don, was Lieutenant Governor.

In 1816, after the 95th Rifles became The Rifle Brigade, the regiment was re-numbered as the 95th Regiment of Foot.

Over the next two years the 1st Battalion of the 95th Regiment was stationed at Nottingham and then in Liverpool and Chester. One deployment in summer 1818 took the battalion to Warrington to monitor the general election that year. Finally in autumn 1818 it moved to Sunderland where it was disbanded at the end of the year.

== Colonels of the Regiment ==
Colonels of the regiment were:

96th Regiment of Foot

- 1804-1805 Sir George Ludlow
- 1805-1816 Sir George Don GCB

95th Regiment of Foot

- 1816-1818 Sir George Don GCB
- 1818 Sir Thomas Hislop, Bart, GCB
