= James Ley, 1st Earl of Marlborough =

English politician and judge

The Right Honourable The Earl of Marlborough PC
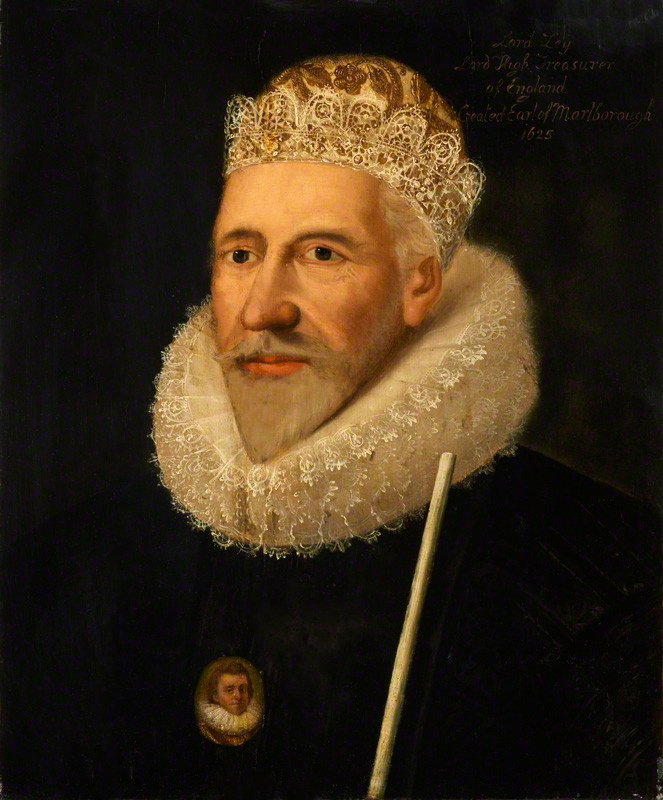

Lord High Treasurer
- In office 11 December 1624 – 15 July 1628
- Monarchs: James I Charles I
- Preceded by: Lionel Cranfield, 1st Earl of Middlesex
- Succeeded by: Richard Weston, 1st Earl of Portland

Member of Parliament for Westbury
- In office 1621–1622 Serving with Miles Fleetwood
- Preceded by: Matthew Ley; Henry Ley
- Succeeded by: Walter Long; Henry Mildmay

Member of Parliament for Bath
- In office 1614–1621 Serving with Nicolas Hyde
- Preceded by: William Shareston; Christopher Stone
- Succeeded by: Sir Robert Phelips; Sir Robert Pye

Member of Parliament for Westbury
- In office 1609–1614 Serving with Matthew Ley
- Preceded by: Matthew Ley; Alexander Chocke
- Succeeded by: Matthew Ley; Henry Ley

Member of Parliament for Westbury
- In office 1604–1605 Serving with Matthew Ley
- Preceded by: Matthew Ley; Henry Jackman
- Succeeded by: Matthew Ley; Alexander Chocke

Member of Parliament for Westbury
- In office 1597–1601 Serving with Matthew Ley
- Preceded by: William Jordyn; Henry Fanshawe
- Succeeded by: Matthew Ley; Henry Jackman

Personal details
- Born: c. 1552 Teffont Evias, Wiltshire, England
- Died: 1629
- Spouses: Mary Pettie; Mary Bowyer; Jane Boteler
- Children: 11, including Henry, William, and Hester

James Ley, 1st Earl of Marlborough (c. 1552–1629) was an English judge and politician who sat in the House of Commons at various times between 1597 and 1622. He was Lord Chief Justice of the King's Bench in Ireland and then in England, and was Lord High Treasurer from 1624 to 1628. On 31 December 1624, James I created him Baron Ley, of Ley in the County of Devon, and on 5 February 1626, Charles I created him Earl of Marlborough. Both titles became extinct upon the death of the 4th Earl of Marlborough in 1679.

== Early life ==
James Ley was the youngest son of the soldier and landowner Henry Ley (died 1574), of Teffont Evias, Wiltshire, where he was born in about 1552. His mother was Dyonisia de St. Mayne, or St. Maure, daughter of Walter St. Maure. He was educated at Queens' College, Cambridge and Brasenose College, Oxford, graduating from Oxford in 1574. He then trained as a barrister, becoming a bencher of Lincoln's Inn and reader of Furnival's Inn.

Ley's older brother Matthew (c. 1545 – 1636) also sat as MP for Westbury.

== Public service ==
Ley was elected as Member of Parliament for Westbury in 1597. In 1603, he was appointed a judge on the Carmarthen circuit. That November he became a serjeant-at-law and in December James I knighted him: the King formed a high opinion of his abilities. He was elected MP for Westbury again in 1604, and then King James sent him to Dublin as Lord Chief Justice of the King's Bench for Ireland. He also served on the Privy Council of Ireland, and was a Commissioner for the Great Seal of Ireland in 1605. He entered the King's Inns, which had been virtually in abeyance, in 1607, and did much to restore its status as a professional body. He was diligent in his official duties, and was the first judge to hold an assize in Wicklow. Amongst other things, he caused the English Book of Common Prayer to be translated into Irish and sought to enforce Protestant church attendance on the Irish Catholic nobility. As a result, he became highly unpopular, and a flood of complaints went back to England concerning the severity of his administration.

Ley was called back to England in 1608, ostensibly to brief the English Privy Council on the settlement of Ulster. He was then appointed to the lucrative post of Attorney-General of the Court of Wards. Further promotion came slowly. He was a member of Parliament for Westbury again in 1609–1614 and was elected MP for Bath in 1614. He was made a baronet in 1619. In 1621 he was made an English judge at Westminster when he became Lord Chief Justice. He was elected MP for Westbury again in 1621, but was required to preside in the House of Lords following the disgrace of Francis Bacon, though he was not made Lord Chancellor, despite reportedly offering £10,000 for the office. The same year he married his third wife Jane Boteler, niece of the prime royal favourite Buckingham.

Late in 1624, through the influence of Buckingham, Ley replaced Cranfield as Lord High Treasurer, also being sworn as a Privy Councillor. He was created Baron Ley, and then in 1626 Earl of Marlborough. His treasurership was hampered by Charles I's financial difficulties, and his own lack of experience in the world of finance. He retired from this in 1628, and from July until December of that year he was Lord President of the Council. However, he soon retired to Lincoln's Inn and died the following March. He was remembered as a poor statesman but an able and impartial judge.

== Other achievements ==
Ley was a founder member of the Society of Antiquaries. None of his works on legal or antiquarian subjects were published in his lifetime, but his grandson James Ley, 3rd Earl of Marlborough arranged for the publication of his treatise on wardship in 1642, and a collection of law reports in 1659. Four of his papers to the Society of Antiquaries were published by Thomas Hearne in his Collection of Curious Discourses (1720).

== Personal life ==
In 1578, Ley and his brother Matthew bought Brembridge manor, near Westbury in Wiltshire, and he went on to acquire other landholdings around Westbury. Matthew later acquired Heywood manor, north of Westbury, and Ley later rebuilt the house there (which was in turn rebuilt in the 19th century).

Ley married firstly Mary Pettie, daughter of John Pettie and Elizabeth Savage, of Stoke Talmage, Oxfordshire, by whom he had three sons and eight daughters, including:

- Henry Ley, 2nd Earl of Marlborough
- William Ley, 4th Earl of Marlborough
- Lady Hester Pulter, the poet
- Anne Ley, who married Sir Walter Long of Draycot Cerne, MP

He married secondly in 1618 Mary Bowyer, daughter of Thomas Pierson, and widow of Sir William Bowyer; she died only a few months later. He married thirdly Jane Boteler, daughter of John Boteler, 1st Baron Boteler of Brantfield and his wife Elizabeth Villiers, half-sister of George Villiers, 1st Duke of Buckingham, to which connection he owed his later advancement. She remarried William Ashburnham and died in 1672. The Earl's third marriage is said to have caused bitter family quarrels.

== Notes ==
Parliament of England
Preceded by William Jordyn; Henry Fanshawe	Member of Parliament for Westbury; 1597–1601; With: Matthew Ley	Succeeded by Matthew Ley; Henry Jackman
Preceded by Matthew Ley; Henry Jackman	Member of Parliament for Westbury; 1604–1605; With: Matthew Ley	Succeeded by Matthew Ley; Alexander Chocke
Preceded by Matthew Ley; Alexander Chocke	Member of Parliament for Westbury; 1609–1614; With: Matthew Ley	Succeeded by Matthew Ley; Henry Ley
Preceded by William Shareston; Christopher Stone	Member of Parliament for Bath; 1614–1621; With: Nicholas Hyde	Succeeded by Sir Robert Phelips; Sir Robert Pye
Preceded by Matthew Ley; Henry Ley	Member of Parliament for Westbury; 1621–1622; With: Sir Miles Fleetwood	Succeeded by Walter Long; Henry Mildmay
Legal offices
Preceded by Robert Gardiner	Lord Chief Justice of Ireland; 1603–1608	Succeeded by Humphrey Winch
Preceded by Sir Henry Montagu	Lord Chief Justice; 1621–1625	Succeeded by Ranulph Crewe
Political offices
Preceded by Earl of Middlesex	Lord High Treasurer; 1624–1628	Succeeded by Earl of Portland
Preceded by The Earl of Manchester	Lord President of the Council; 1628	Succeeded by The Viscount Conway
Peerage of England
New creation	Earl of Marlborough; 1st creation 1626–1629	Succeeded by Henry Ley
New creation	Baron Ley (descended by acceleration); 1624–1628	Succeeded by Henry Ley
Baronetage of England
New creation	Baronet of Westbury; 1619–1629	Succeeded by Henry Ley
