= Sir Thomas Hislop, 1st Baronet =

British Army general

Lieutenant-General Sir Thomas Hislop Bt GCB
- Born: 5 July 1764
- Died: 3 May 1843 (aged 78); Charlton, Kent
- Military career
- Allegiance: United Kingdom
- Branch: (United Kingdom) British Army
- Service years: 1778 to 1822
- Rank: Lieutenant-General
- Commands: Madras Army
- Conflicts: American Revolutionary War; Great Siege of Gibraltar; French Revolutionary Wars; Capture of Corsica; Capture of Demerara; Capture of Berbice; Capture of Essequibo; Napoleonic Wars; Invasion of Martinique; Invasion of Guadeloupe; War of 1812; Capture of HMS Java; Third Anglo-Maratha War; Battle of Mahidpur
- Awards: Baronetcy; Knight Grand Cross of the Order of the Bath

Sir Thomas Hislop, 1st Baronet, GCB (5 July 1764 – 3 May 1843) was a senior British Army officer of the late eighteenth and early nineteenth centuries. Serving exclusively in colonial campaigns, Hislop fought in the West Indies between 1796 and 1810 and subsequently in India, where he was a senior commander during the Third Anglo-Maratha War. Although his ability as a general was praised, Hislop came under criticism in Parliament for his heavy reprisals against forces of the Maratha Empire, particularly at Thalner, where he ordered the execution of over 300 men. He was also known for financial profligacy, losing large sums of money investing unsuccessfully in the Americas. Despite these problems, Hislop was later made a baronet and a Knight Grand Cross of the Order of the Bath, serving in his retirement as an equerry to Prince Adolphus, Duke of Cambridge.

== Early life ==
Hislop was born in 1764, the third son of Lieutenant Colonel William Hislop of the Royal Artillery of the British Army. Like his two elder brothers, Hislop followed his father into the British Army, studying at the Royal Military Academy, Woolwich before joining the 39th Regiment of Foot as an ensign in 1778. Both of his brothers would be killed in action fighting in India, James at the Battle of Pollilur in 1781 and William at Cundapore in 1783. Thomas Hislop's first combat was during the American Revolutionary War, when his regiment served in the garrison during the Great Siege of Gibraltar. In 1783 at the end of the war, Hislop was promoted to lieutenant and purchased the rank of captain 1785, serving for a month with the 100th Regiment of Foot before returning to the 39th.

== French Revolutionary Wars ==
In 1792 Hislop left his regiment to become an aide to General David Dundas, with whom he participated in the invasion of Corsica at the start of the French Revolutionary Wars. At the capture of San Fiorenzo he was sent to Britain with the despatches, promoted to major and made an aide to Lord Amherst.

In 1795 Hislop undertook a secret diplomatic mission to Germany at the request of the Prince of Wales and was subsequently promoted to lieutenant colonel in the 115th Regiment of Foot, returning to the 39th six months later.

== In the Caribbean ==
In 1796 Hislop's regiment was sent to the West Indies, and Hislop participated in the capture of the Dutch colonies of Demerara, Berbice, and Essequibo. After their capture, Hislop remained in the territory as military commander, raising a number of battalions of the West India Regiment. He moved to Trinidad as lieutenant governor in 1802 after the Peace of Amiens. In 1806 as Spain was then at war with Britain, Hyslop agreed with admiral Alexander Cochrane to provide some support to general Francisco de Miranda for a second attempt to invade Venezuela under Spanish rule. In the aftermath of the failed expedition, Miranda spent the next year in Port of Spain as host of Hislop waiting for reinforcements that never came and return to London. In 1809, as British forces gathered for operations against the French Leeward Islands, Hislop joined them as a subordinate to Lieutenant-General George Beckwith and participated in the invasion of Martinique in February 1809 and the invasion of Guadeloupe in January 1810, commanding a division during the latter operation. He was promoted to major-general, and returned to Britain due to ill-health in 1811.

== In captivity ==
In 1812, Hislop was made commander-in-chief at Bombay as a lieutenant general and sailed to take up his position in the frigate HMS Java. On 29 December 1812, Java engaged USS Constitution and was captured, Hislop was made a prisoner. During the naval engagement, Hislop had remained on deck and participated in the fighting, and was commended for his service. He was released at Salvador in Brazil and returned to Britain.

== Time in India ==
In late 1814, Hislop finally took up a post in India as Commander-in-Chief of the Madras Army. He was rewarded for his services the same year with a baronetcy and investiture as a Knight Commander of the Order of the Bath. In 1817, the Third Anglo-Maratha War broke out and Hislop was given command of the main British force, numbering 5,500 men. Advancing on 10 November, Hislop defeated the 35,000 strong army of Malhar Rao Holkar at the Battle of Mahidpur on 21 December and then ensured the surrender of the Maratha border fortresses. One fort at Talnar refused to surrender, and Hislop seized the fort and massacred all 300 of its defenders. With the campaign complete, Hislop's army was dissolved in March 1818. For his leadership in the campaign he was advanced to a Knight Grand Cross of the Order of the Bath.

Hislop's actions at Talnar came under investigation at the urging of the Governor-General of India, Lord Moira, and as a result he was specifically excluded from the vote of thanks proposed in the House of Commons. He was also embroiled in a controversy surrounding the distribution of the valuables confiscated from the Marathas, known as the "Deccan Prize". Although Hislop claimed the rewards for distribution among his forces, an alternative claim for a force led by Lord Moira was held as equally valid even though they took no part in the fighting. Despite a political defence of his character by the Duke of Wellington, Hislop was removed from command in 1820. He remained in India.

== Later life ==
Later in life he served briefly in 1822 as Colonel in Chief of the Sutherland Highlanders following the death of William Wemyss then as honorary colonel for the 51st Regiment of Foot (1822–29) and the 48th Regiment of Foot (1829–43) and spent a number of years after his return to Britain as an equerry to Prince Adolphus, Duke of Cambridge. He died at his home in Charlton, Kent in 1843.

== Family ==
Hislop married in 1822 Emma Elliot of Madras, daughter of Hugh Elliot. Their daughter, Emma Eleanor Elizabeth, married William Elliot-Murray-Kynynmound, 3rd Earl of Minto, in 1844.

== Notes ==
Military offices
| Preceded by Sir John Abercromby | C-in-C, Madras Army; 1814–1820 | Succeeded by Sir Alexander Campbell |
| Preceded by Sir George Don | Colonel of the 95th Regiment of Foot; 1818 | Regiment disbanded |
| Preceded by Lord Charles FitzRoy | Colonel of the 48th (Northamptonshire) Regiment of Foot; 1829–43 | Succeeded by George Middlemore |
| Preceded by William Morshead | Colonel of the 51st (2nd Yorkshire West Riding) Regiment of Foot; 1822–29 | Succeeded by Sir Benjamin D'Urban |
| Preceded by William Wemyss | Colonel of the 93rd (Highland) Regiment of Foot; 1822 | Succeeded by Sir Hudson Lowe |
Baronetage of the United Kingdom
| New creation | Baronet (of Tothill); 1813–1843 | Extinct |
| Preceded by Henniker baronets | Hislop baronets of Tothill; 2 November 1813 | Succeeded by Oakes baronets |
