= William Ley, 4th Earl of Marlborough =

William Ley, 4th Earl of Marlborough (1612–1679) was an English peer, a member of the House of Lords from 1665 until his death.

A younger son of James Ley, 1st Earl of Marlborough, he married Margaret, a daughter of Sir William Hewett of Beccles, Suffolk. On 3 June 1665 he succeeded to the peerages on the death of his nephew James Ley, 3rd Earl of Marlborough (1618–1665).

When he died in 1679, with no surviving descendants, the peerages became extinct.

== Notes ==
Peerage of England
Preceded by James Ley	Earl of Marlborough; 1665–1679	Extinct
