= Lacock Cup =

Late medieval silver standing-cup

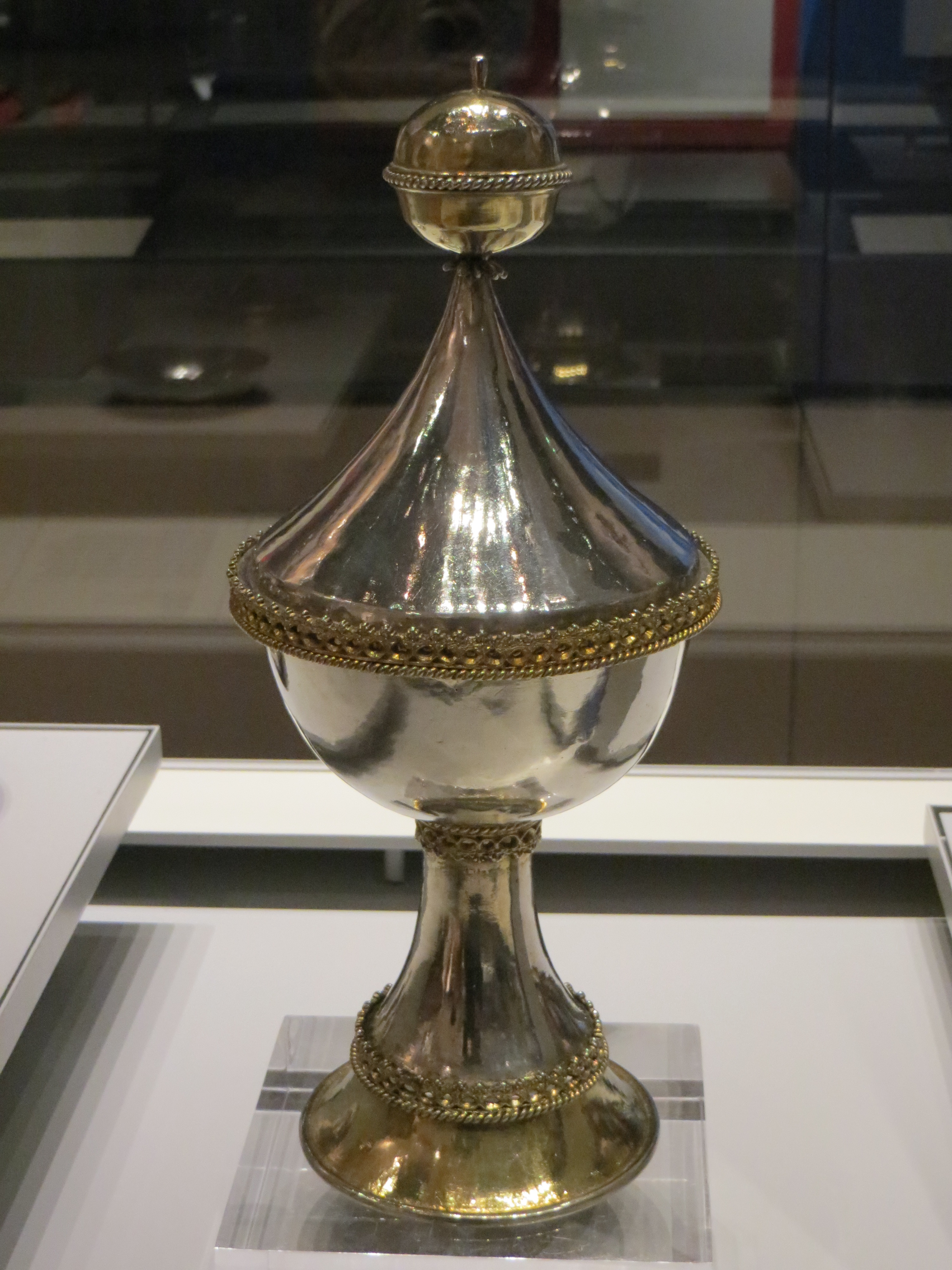
- The Lacock Cup as displayed in the British Museum
- Material: Silver
- Size: 33cm high
- Created: Mid-15th century
- Present location: British Museum, London

The Lacock Cup is a late medieval silver standing-cup. It was made for secular use, which makes its survival very rare, but was early in its life given to St Cyriac's Church in Lacock, Wiltshire, England, where it was used as a chalice. It is now in the British Museum, where it is usually on display.

== History ==
The cup dates from the mid-15th century and has been described as "one of the most significant pieces of secular English medieval silver". Most such feasting cups have been destroyed or were altered due to changing fashion. However, the Lacock Cup was donated to the church soon after it was made and so it has survived in its original condition. The cup's function changed after the English Reformation, as new religious practices meant that a larger communion cup was required to hold sufficient wine for the whole congregation during a time when strict laws prohibited the use of religious images. Since 1962, it has been on display at the British Museum.

== Sale ==
In 2009, with mounting financial pressure on maintaining and restoring the church's structure, the Lacock Parochial Church Council (LPCC) had the cup valued at £1.8 million. The LPCC then applied for a faculty (licence) to sell the cup with the British Museum interested in changing the loan into a purchase agreement. Local resident Geoffrey Fox legally challenged the sale, but at consistory court in December 2013, the Reverend Justin Gau said he was satisfied the circumstances of the sale were justified.

== Joint purchase ==
External videos
- The Lacock Cup at the British Museum, TheArtFundUK

On 24 December 2013, the sale was completed by a joint bid from the British Museum and the Wiltshire Museum, for a sum of £1.3 million which was raised through private donations as well as grant funds from the National Heritage Memorial Fund and the Art Fund. As part of the sale agreement, two replicas were to be made: one for liturgical use at the church and one to go on display at the Wiltshire Museum when the original is not on display.
