= William Jordyn (died 1623) =

English politician

William Jordyn (c. 1566 – 1623) was briefly an English member of parliament.

Jordyn was a member (MP) of the Parliament of England for Westbury in 1593.

Parliament of England
Preceded by Sir Henry Fanshawe; John Bennett	Member of Parliament for Westbury; 1593–1597; With: Sir Henry Fanshawe	Succeeded by Matthew Ley; James Ley
