= USS Ludlow (DD-112) =

Wickes-class destroyer

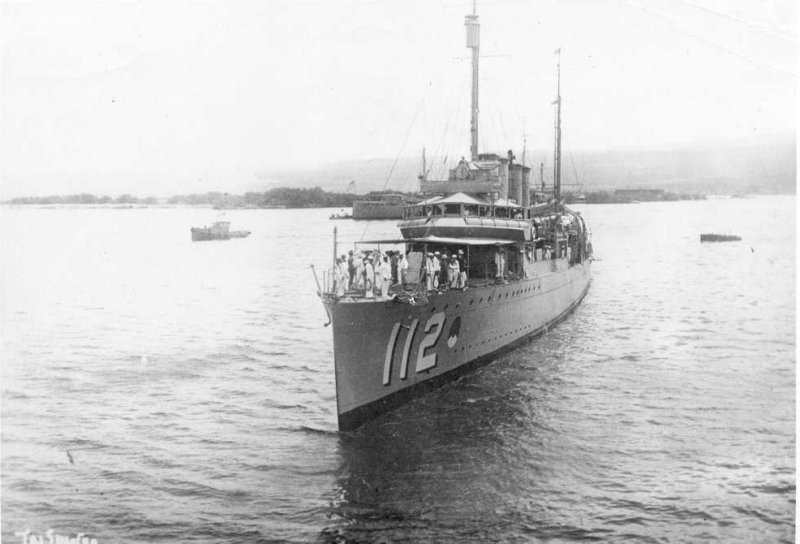
- USS Ludlow (DD-112)

History

United States
- Name: USS Ludlow
- Namesake: Augustus C. Ludlow
- Builder: Union Iron Works, San Francisco, California
- Laid down: 7 January 1918
- Launched: 9 June 1918
- Commissioned: 23 December 1918
- Decommissioned: 24 May 1930
- Stricken: 18 November 1930
- Fate: Scrapped and sold, 10 March 1931

General characteristics
- Class & type: Wickes-class destroyer
- Displacement: 1,202–1,208 long tons (1,221–1,227 t) (standard); 1,295–1,322 long tons (1,316–1,343 t) (deep load)
- Length: 314 ft 4 in (95.8 m)
- Beam: 30 ft 11 in (9.42 m)
- Draught: 9 ft 10 in (3.0 m)
- Installed power: 27,000 shp (20,000 kW); 4 water-tube boilers
- Propulsion: 2 shafts, 2 steam turbines
- Speed: 35 knots (65 km/h; 40 mph) (design)
- Range: 2,500 nautical miles (4,600 km; 2,900 mi) at 20 knots (37 km/h; 23 mph) (design)
- Complement: 6 officers, 108 enlisted men
- Armament: 4 × single 4-inch (102 mm) guns; 2 × single 1-pounder AA guns; 4 × triple 21 inch (533 mm) torpedo tubes; 2 × depth charge rails

USS Ludlow (DD-112) was a Wickes-class destroyer built for the United States Navy during World War I.

== Description ==
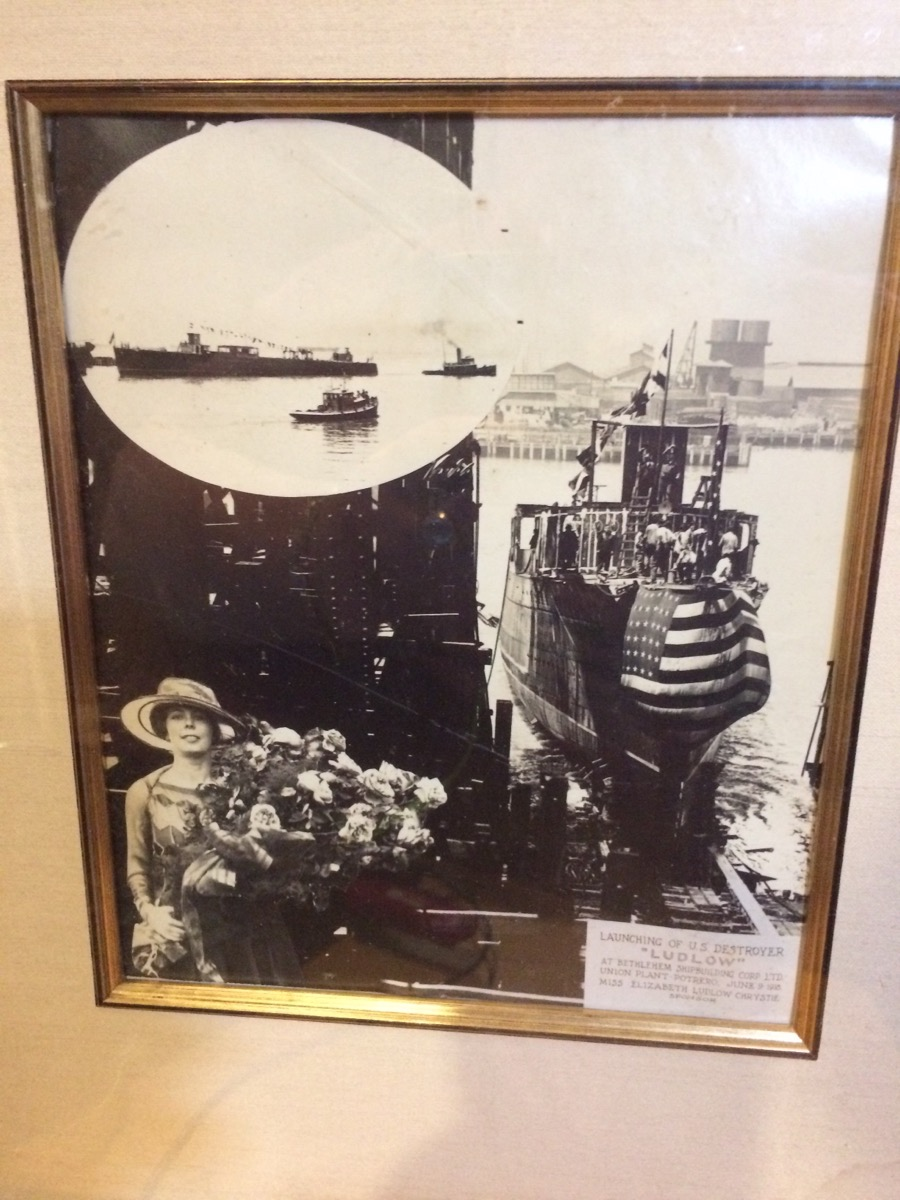
Amalgam of photos taken by Thomas Ludlow Chrystie of his daughter as sponsor of the launch of the USS Ludlow in 1918

The Wickes class was an improved and faster version of the preceding Caldwell-class. Two different designs were prepared to the same specification that mainly differed in the turbines and boilers used. The ships built to the Bethlehem Steel design, built in the Fore River and Union Iron Works shipyards, mostly used Yarrow boilers that deteriorated badly during service and were mostly scrapped during the 1930s. The ships displaced 1,202–1,208 long tons (1,221–1,227 t) at standard load and 1,295–1,322 long tons (1,316–1,343 t) at deep load. They had an overall length of 314 feet 4 inches (95.8 m), a beam of 30 feet 11 inches (9.4 m) and a draught of 9 feet 10 inches (3.0 m). They had a crew of 6 officers and 108 enlisted men.

Performance differed radically between the ships of the class, often due to poor workmanship. The Wickes class was powered by two steam turbines, each driving one propeller shaft, using steam provided by four water-tube boilers. The turbines were designed to produce a total of 27,000 shaft horsepower (20,000 kW) intended to reach a speed of 35 knots (65 km/h; 40 mph). The ships carried 225 long tons (229 t) of fuel oil which was intended gave them a range of 2,500 nautical miles (4,600 km; 2,900 mi) at 20 knots (37 km/h; 23 mph).

The ships were armed with four 4-inch (102 mm) guns in single mounts and were fitted with two 1-pounder guns for anti-aircraft defense. Their primary weapon, though, was their torpedo battery of a dozen 21 inch (533 mm) torpedo tubes in four triple mounts. In many ships a shortage of 1-pounders caused them to be replaced by 3-inch (76 mm) anti-aircraft (AA) guns. They also carried a pair of depth charge rails. A "Y-gun" depth charge thrower was added to many ships.

== Construction and career ==
Ludlow named for Augustus C. Ludlow, was laid down 7 January 1918 at Union Iron Works, San Francisco, California, launched 9 June 1918; sponsored by Miss Elizabeth Ludlow Chrystie, a descendant of Lieutenant Ludlow; and commissioned 23 December 1918. Following west coast shakedown, Ludlow embarked on the continuous training program. On 17 July 1920 she was reclassified as a light minelayer and redesignated DM-10, A change of home ports followed 19 January 1921 when she arrived at Pearl Harbor for eight years with Mine Squadron 2, Fleet Base Force.

Ludlow joined in gunnery practice, mining operations antisubmarine training, and fleet battle problems in the Hawaiian Islands and off the United States West Coast, and in 1929 trained Naval Reserves. Leaving Pearl Harbor 16 November 1929, she arrived San Diego on 26 November 1929, and there decommissioned on 24 May 1930. Struck from the Navy list on 18 November 1930, she was scrapped and her metal sold 10 March 1931.
