= George Don (British Army officer) =

British Army officer (1756–1832)

General Sir George Don GCB GCH
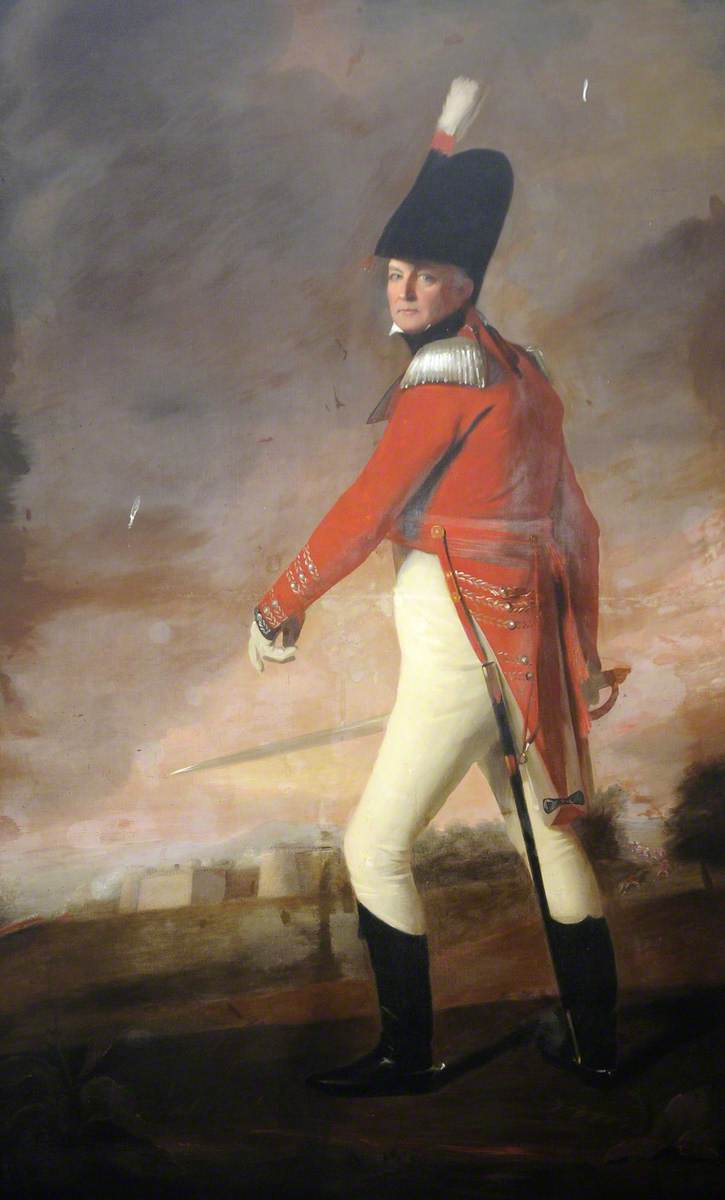
- Portrait by George Watson
- Born: 30 April 1756; Edinburgh, Scotland
- Died: 17 January 1832 (aged 75); Gibraltar
- Military career
- Allegiance: Great Britain; United Kingdom
- Branch: British Army
- Service years: 1770–1832
- Rank: General
- Conflicts: American War of Independence • Siege of Fort St. Philip, Menorca; French Revolutionary Wars • Flanders Campaign • Invasion of the Batavian Republic; Napoleonic Wars • Walcheren Expedition
- Awards: Knight Grand Cross of the Order of the Bath; Knight Grand Cross of the Royal Guelphic Order
- Other work: Lieutenant Governor of Jersey; Governor of Gibraltar

General Sir George Don GCB GCH (30 April 1756 – 17 January 1832) was a British Army officer who served in the American War of Independence and French Revolutionary and Napoleonic Wars. His service was conducted across Europe, but his most important work was in military and defensive organisation against the threat of French invasion during the French Revolutionary and Napoleonic Wars. Don was also frequently requested for advisory and espionage work by British generals and was once employed by the Prussian State as a spy. In 1799 he was arrested during a truce by Guillaume Brune who accused him of attempting to foment rebellion in the Batavian Republic and was not released until the Peace of Amiens. During and following the wars, Don also served as Lieutenant Governor of Jersey and Governor Gibraltar, implementing organizational reforms with much success in both places.

== Early career ==
Don was born in 1756, the second son of wine merchant John Don and his wife Anna Seton. In 1770, Don joined the army as an ensign in the 51st Regiment of Foot and was stationed in Menorca from 1774 after being made Lieutenant. Menorca was, at the time, a British-administered territory and naval base, and was heavily fortified after its capture by the Spanish and recapture in the Seven Years' War twenty years earlier. During his service on the island, Don became close acquaintances with the island's governor General Johnstone and General James Murray and served on the staff of the former as aide-de-camp and was consequently promoted to captain.

During the American Revolutionary War, Menorca came under attack by Spanish and French forces and Don was an important figure in the seven-month siege of the British garrison in Fort St. Philip. Despite the enforced surrender of the garrison in 1782, his reputation was enhanced and he gained further status when he married Murray's niece, Maria Margaretta, in 1783. Promoted major the same year, Don transferred to the 59th Regiment of Foot for his first posting in Gibraltar where he served on peacetime duty until 1791. With war again looming in the aftermath of the French Revolution, he was promoted to lieutenant colonel and given a staff appointment in Jersey, where his regiment was stationed in 1792. Jersey was an obvious target of the French if war was declared, and he worked on the island's defences before being called away by Murray in 1793 to serve as his aide-de-camp in the unsuccessful Flanders Campaign. For his services in this campaign, Don was given the ceremonial post of Aide-de-Camp to King George III and was promoted to full colonel.

== French Revolutionary War ==
Don was not evacuated with the rest of the British army in 1795 after the campaign's collapse, but instead remained in Europe in the service of the Prussian King. Prussia had been knocked out of the war following the Peace of Basel in 1795, but remained allied to Britain in her struggle with France and Don was seconded to the Prussian court as a liaison officer. He may have coordinated espionage activities against France during this period, although records are vague.

In 1798 Don returned to Britain as a major-general and was placed in command of the defences of the Isle of Wight, a weak spot on the Southern Coast of England. In 1799, he was attached to the force under the Duke of York which invaded the Batavian Republic with an Anglo-Russian army. He was ostensibly in command of the 3rd Division under Sir David Dundas but was frequently detached on espionage and negotiation duties. This culminated in his arrest by Guillaume Brune during negotiations to allow a peaceful withdrawal of allied troops.

Charged with attempting to provoke an anti-French rebellion among the Dutch inhabitants of the Batavian Republic, Don spent the next two years in prison, only being released at the end of 1800 in the prelude to the Peace of Amiens. While in captivity, he was rewarded with the colonelcy of the 9th West India Regiment. On his release, Don returned to Scotland and in 1802 was in charge of organising and training the militia forces which were tasked with the defence of the South-Eastern coast of Scotland. In 1803 he returned to London to command the King's German Legion, a Hanoverian formation seconded to the British Army. Promoted Lieutenant-General on 1 January 1805, on 5 November of the same year he sailed with a 14,000 strong force to Germany, part of the Hanover Expedition. Landing at Cuxhaven 17th he was superseded by Lord Cathcart soon after his arrival.

== Governor of Jersey and Gibraltar ==
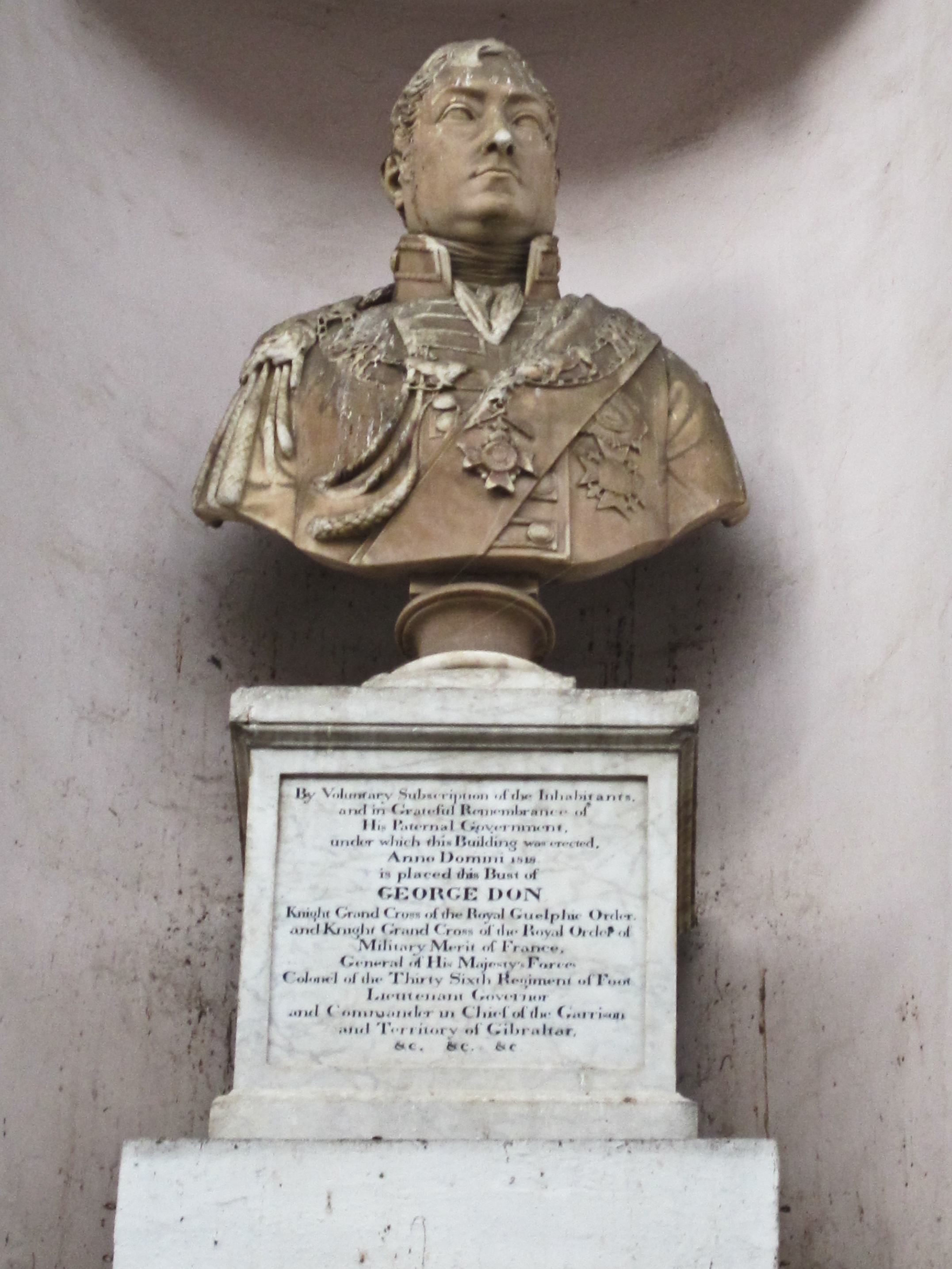
Bust of George Don outside the Gibraltar Parliament by William Grinsell Nicholl

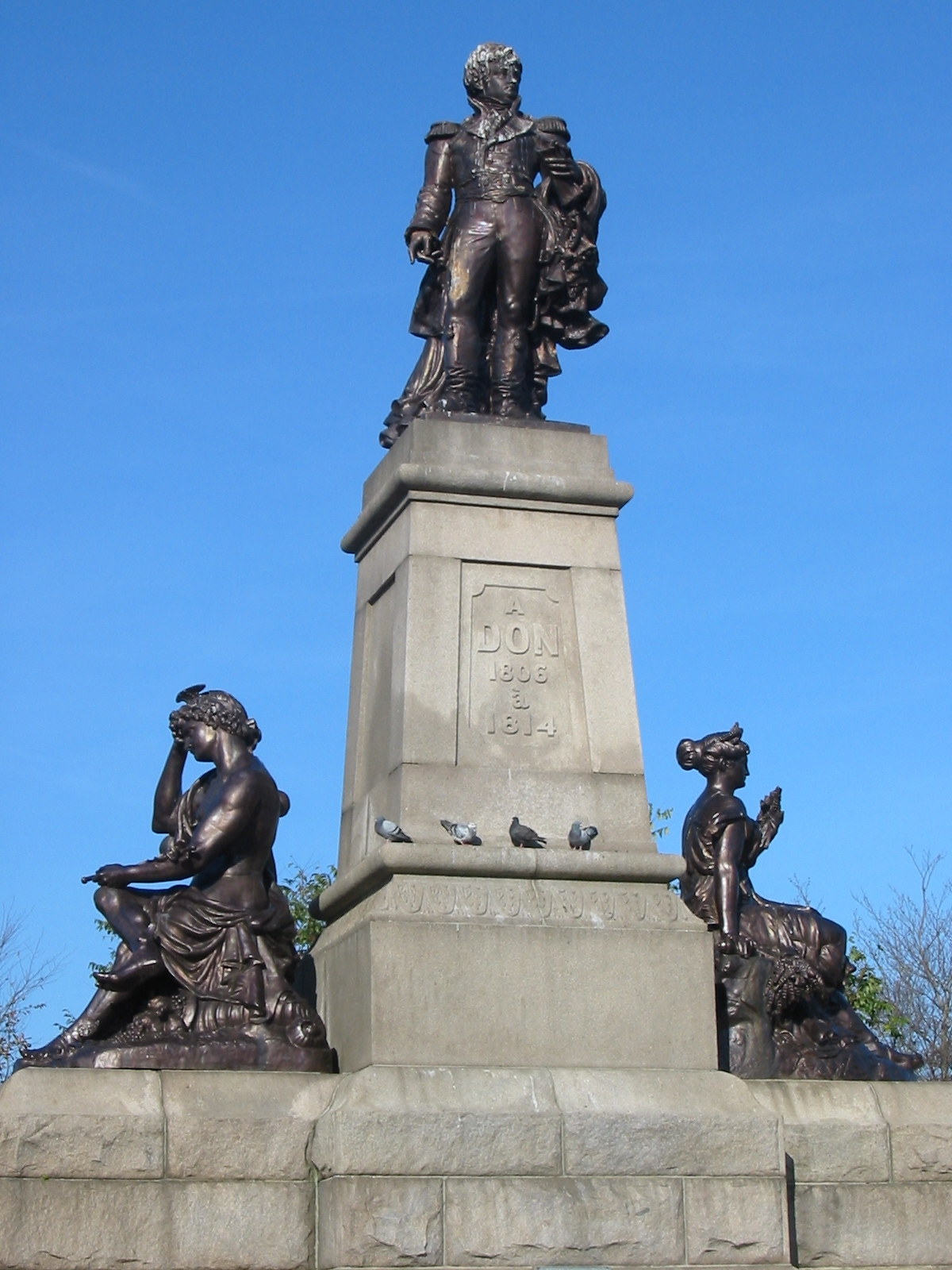
Statue of Don in Saint Helier, Jersey

In 1805 Don's colonelcy was transferred to the 96th Regiment of Foot. In 1806 he was made Lieutenant Governor of Jersey, a post he maintained for the entire duration of the Napoleonic Wars. In Jersey, he built roads and defences, organised local militia and built up a strong relationship with the local community. His tenure there was only briefly broken in 1809 when he was attached to the ill-fated Walcheren Expedition to command the withdrawal of thousands of desperately sick men.

In 1814, after lengthy service on Jersey, Don became a full General and took the post of Governor of Gibraltar. Finding Gibraltar in the grip of yellow fever, he used his experience from past commissions to organise and build an effective sanitation system in the territory, including a clean water supply, a new hospital and the Alameda Botanic Gardens park.

Don's stay in Gibraltar also included several other innovations including the first police force, the forerunner of the Royal Gibraltar Police, the main courthouse, updated defences and a network of roads connecting the peninsula with the Spanish hinterland. During his 17-year stay in Gibraltar, Don became very popular and was effectively governor except for 1821–25, when Lord Chatham was in Gibraltar. He was in charge of Gibraltar as Lieutenant-Governor while the title of Governor was held by the absentee Duke of Kent until his death in 1820, followed by the Earl of Chatham.

== Later life ==
Don also served as the colonel of the 36th Regiment of Foot and the 3rd Regiment of Foot during his time in Gibraltar. He retired in late 1831 as a Knight Grand Cross of the Order of the Bath and a Knight Grand Cross of the Royal Guelphic Order for his extensive service as a military officer and colonial governor and was given the retirement posting of Governor of Scarborough Castle. He did not return to England however. He died of influenza on 17 January 1832 and was buried in the new English Church (later the Cathedral of the Holy Trinity, Gibraltar) which he had had built during his time as Governor. Cape Don, at the tip of the Cobourg Peninsula, Northern Territory, Australia, is named after him. The MV Cape Don is in turn named after the lighthouse.

== Notes ==
Military offices
Preceded by John Moore	Colonel of the 7th West India Regiment; 1799–1805	Succeeded by Isaac Gascoyne
Preceded by George Ludlow, 3rd Earl Ludlow	Colonel of the 96th Regiment of Foot; 1805–1818	Succeeded by Sir Thomas Hislop (as 95th Regiment)
Preceded by Andrew Gordon	Lieutenant Governor of Jersey; 1806–1814	Succeeded by Sir Hilgrove Turner
Preceded by Colin Campbell	Governor of Gibraltar (acting); 1814–1821	Succeeded by The Earl of Chatham
Preceded by Henry St. John	Colonel of the 36th (Herefordshire) Regiment of Foot; 1818–1829	Succeeded by Sir Roger Sheaffe
Preceded by The Earl of Chatham	Governor of Gibraltar (acting); 1825–1831	Succeeded by Sir William Houston
Preceded by Sir Henry Clinton	Colonel of 3rd (the East Kent) Regiment of Foot; 1829–1832	Succeeded by The Lord Howard of Effingham
