= St Cyriac's Church, Lacock =

Church in Lacock, Wiltshire, England

Coordinates: 51°24′57.26″N 2°7′14.67″W

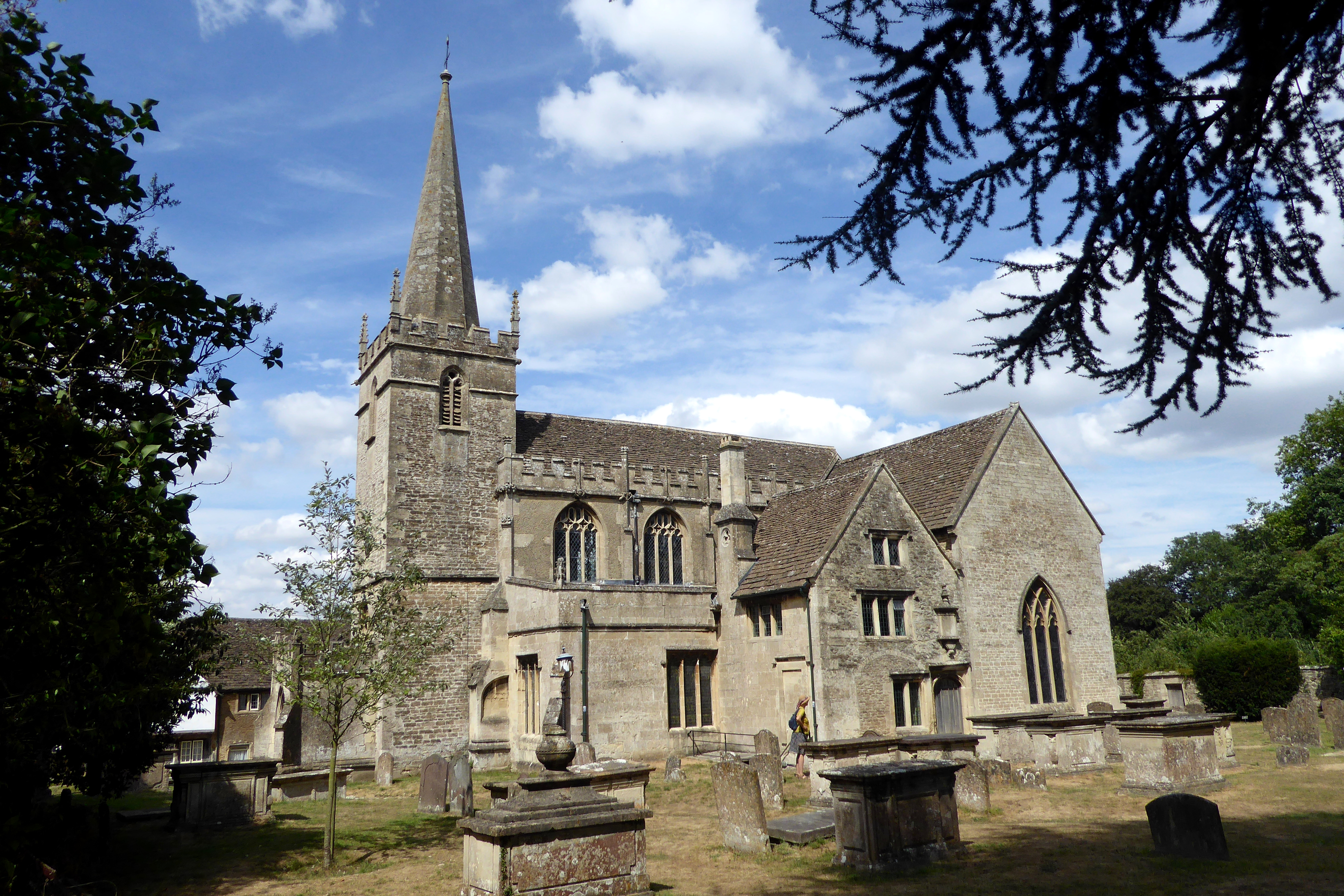
St Cyriac's church, viewed from the south-west

St Cyriac's Church is a 14th-century Church of England parish church in the village of Lacock, Wiltshire.

== History ==
The Norman architecture base to the current church, funded jointly by local landowners Edward of Salisbury of Lacock and William II, Count of Eu of Lackham, may have been built on the site of a previously established Saxon church. It is dedicated to a Norman saint, St. Cyriac. The interior has many later monuments to local landowners, including the Baynards, Bonhams, Crokes, Sharingtons, Talbots and Awdreys.

The church was partly rebuilt in the 14th century, with decorated tracery in a north transept window. But with Lacock a prosperous market town on the sheep droving route from Bath to London, a more extensive 15th-century rebuild was undertaken from the substantial local tax revenues. This created the perpendicular church on a traditional cruciform plan that exists today, and included the addition of a two-bay east chapel funded by the Bonham and Croke families, which has an east chancel arch window of six lights.

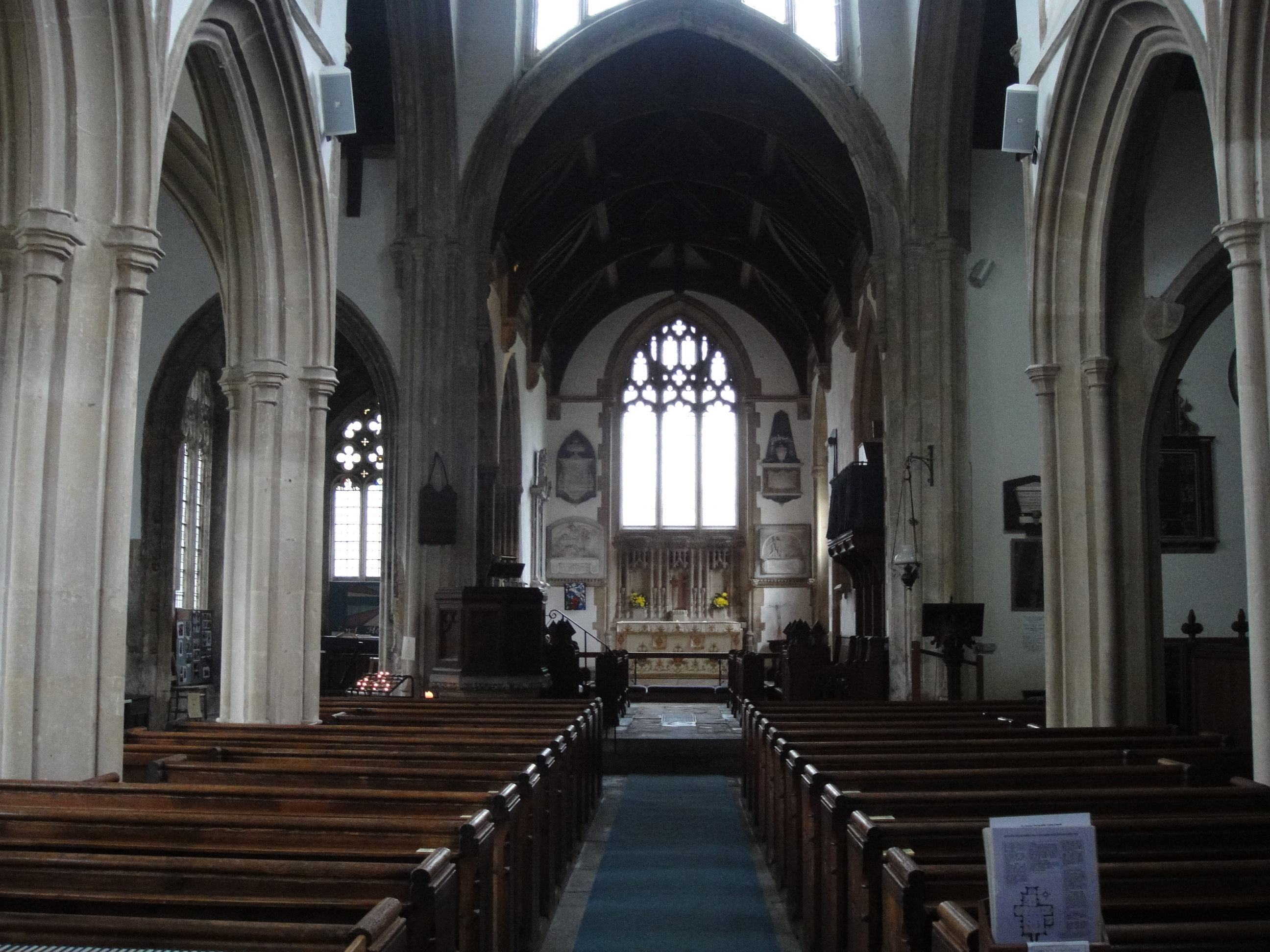
The interior of the church

In 1604 the recessed octagonal tower was rebuilt, followed later by the "cottage" or south annex, comprising two storeys; an attic was built in a rusticated style, described then as the "new Yle" in 1619. After his death in 1636, a series of brass plaques were placed in the church floor commemorating the life of Sir Robert Baynard. (These were stolen in mid-2004, but quickly returned after a national appeal by police.) The chancel was rebuilt in 1777, in a style out of keeping with the main late-medieval church.

In the late 1800s, the new owners of Lackham House, the Baynard family, had the then named Lackham chapel, now the Lackham or Baynard chapel, completely rebuilt. A new roof was put on the transept, which was filled with north-facing pews for the Baynard family and their estate workers. In 1861, again funded by the family, A.W. Blomfield undertook restoration work on the church, including raising of the transept roofs; a new front; breaking up of the high box pews; taking down the galleries and organ at the west end; and breaking in half of ledger stones from the floor. In 1902, Sir Harold Brakspear remodelled the church in a way sympathetic to his friend and local resident, the photographic pioneer William Henry Fox Talbot.

In 1960 the church was designated as Grade I listed.

== 21st century ==
In the early 21st century, the church was subject to a series of improvement programmes, enabled by public donation, private subscription and funding from national bodies. These have been co-ordinated by both the Friends of Lacock Church and the Lacock Parochial Church Council (LPCC) and included the re-roofing of the nave and south transept in 2006.

== Lacock Cup ==
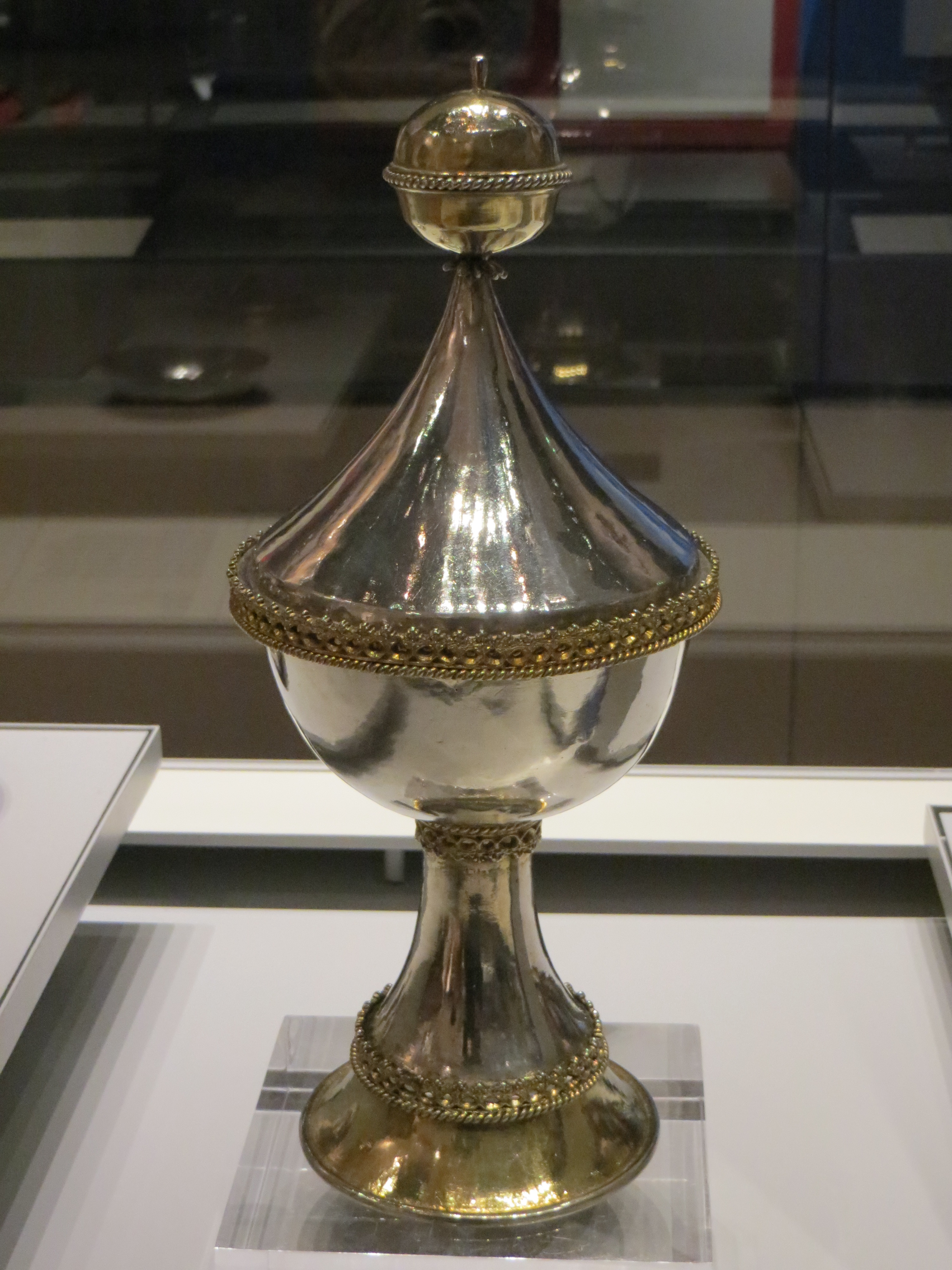
The Lacock Cup on display at the British Museum in London

Until 1962, when it was lent to the British Museum, the church was home to a medieval silver chalice, known as the Lacock Cup. Dating from the mid-15th century, the cup has been described as "one of the most significant pieces of secular English medieval silver". In 2009, LPCC had the cup valued at £1.8M. After approval of the cup's sale by a consistory court in December 2012, it was sold to a joint bid by the British Museum and the Wiltshire Museum. With the funds being invested to raise income to allow restoration of St Cyriac's infrastructure, as part of the sale agreement two replicas were to be made: one for liturgical use at the church, and one to go on display at the Wiltshire Museum, when the original is not on display.
