= Sir William Hanham, 8th Baronet =

British baronet (1798–1877)

Sir William Hanham, 8th Baronet (1798–1877) of Deans Court in Wimborne, was a baronet and Naval officer.

== Biography ==
He was the son of Rev. Sir James Hanham, 7th Baronet and his wife Anne Pyke daughter of Edward Pyke, who was an officer in the Royal Navy.

William Hanham succeeded his father to the baronetcy in 1849, becoming the 8th Baronet.

Hanham was an Officer in the Royal Navy reaching the rank of Captain.

== Marriage ==
Sir William Hanham married November 6, 1823 to Harriet Morgan, daughter of George Morgan, but had no issue.

== Succession ==
As Sir William Hanham had no Issue he was succeeded to the baronetcy by his nephew, Sir John Alexander Hanham, 9th Baronet, who was son of his late half brother Captain John Hanham and wife Amy Ursula Copland.
