= Ludlow Creek =

Stream in Ohio, U.S.

Coordinates: 40°00′11″N 84°19′30″W

Ludlow Creek is a stream in the U.S. state of Ohio. The 13.5-mile (21.7 km) long stream is a tributary of the Stillwater River.

Ludlow Creek was named for a government surveyor, Israel Ludlow.

== See also ==
- List of rivers of Ohio
