= Peter Ludlow, 1st Earl Ludlow =

British politician

The Right Honourable The Earl Ludlow PC

Comptroller of the Household
- In office 1782–1784
- Monarch: George III
- Prime Minister: The Earl of Shelburne; The Duke of Portland; William Pitt the Younger
- Preceded by: Sir Richard Worsley, Bt
- Succeeded by: The Viscount Galway

Personal details
- Born: 21 April 1730
- Died: 26 October 1803 (aged 73)
- Spouse: Lady Frances Lumley

Peter Ludlow, 1st Earl Ludlow PC (21 April 1730 – 26 October 1803), known as The Lord Ludlow between 1755 and 1760, was a British politician. He served as Comptroller of the Household from 1782 to 1784.

== Background ==
Ludlow was the son of Peter Ludlow and Mary, daughter of John Preston, of Ardsalla, County Meath (of the Viscounts Gormanston). He was the grandson of Stephen Ludlow, who represented several constituencies in the Irish House of Commons, and the great-grandson of Henry Ludlow, brother of the Parliamentarian general Edmund Ludlow.

== Political career ==
In 1755 Ludlow, then aged only 25, was elevated to the Peerage of Ireland as Baron Ludlow, of Ardsalla in the County of Meath. Five years later he was further honoured when he was made Viscount Preston, of Ardsalla in the County of Meath, and Earl Ludlow, both in the Peerage or Ireland. Lord Ludlow remained eligible to stand for election to the House of Commons and in 1768 he was returned for Huntingdonshire, a seat he would hold for the next 28 years. In 1782 he was sworn of the Privy Council and appointed Comptroller of the Household, a post he held until 1784.

== Family ==
Lord Ludlow married Lady Frances, eldest daughter of Thomas Lumley-Saunderson, 3rd Earl of Scarbrough, in 1753. They had two sons and four daughters. They lived at Great Staughton Manor in Huntingdonshire.

He died in October 1803, aged 73, and was succeeded in the earldom by his eldest son, Augustus. Ludlow's second son George, the third Earl, was a General in the British Army.

Parliament of Great Britain
Preceded by The Lord Carysfort; Sir Robert Bernard, Bt	Member of Parliament for Huntingdonshire; 1768–1796; With: Viscount Hinchingbrooke 1768–1792; Lancelot Brown 1792–1794; Viscount Hinchingbrooke 1794–1796	Succeeded by Viscount Hinchingbrooke; Lord Frederick Montagu
Political offices
Preceded by Sir Richard Worsley, Bt	Comptroller of the Household; 1782–1784	Succeeded by The Viscount Galway
Peerage of Ireland
New creation	Earl Ludlow; 1760–1803	Succeeded by Augustus Ludlow
New creation	Baron Ludlow; 1755–1803	Succeeded by Augustus Ludlow
