= James Ley, 3rd Earl of Marlborough =

British peer, naval admiral, MP and coloniser

The Right Honourable James Ley
- Earl of Marlborough
- Tenure: 1638–1665
- Predecessor: Henry Ley, 2nd Earl of Marlborough
- Successor: William Ley, 4th Earl of Marlborough
- Other titles: Baron Ley
- Born: 28 January 1618
- Died: 3 June 1665 (aged 47)
- Father: Henry Ley, 2nd Earl of Marlborough
- Mother: Mary Capell

James Ley, 3rd Earl of Marlborough (28 January 1618 – 3 June 1665) was an English peer, naval admiral and coloniser, and Member of Parliament. He was styled Lord Ley from 1629 to 1638.

== Life ==
He was the only son of Henry Ley, 2nd Earl of Marlborough, whom he succeeded in 1638. He inherited property in and around Westbury, Wiltshire, including Heywood House, which had been built by his grandfather, the 1st Earl; but he sold Heywood and most of the other properties in the next two years.

Marlborough was General of Ordnance in the West for Charles I in 1643, during the English Civil War, and later in the year was appointed Admiral of the Royal fleet at Dartmouth.

Through diligent study, Marlborough gained a reputation as an able mathematician and navigator. He founded an English colony in St Croix in 1645, which was, however, destroyed in 1650. He proposed to embark on another colonizing venture in 1649, which was apparently unsuccessful.

After the Stuart Restoration, in late 1661 he was given command of HMS Dunkirk and sent out as commodore of a squadron to claim Bombay, which had been ceded to England as the dowry of Catherine of Braganza on her marriage to the English king, Charles II. The fleet carried the last Portuguese governor of Bombay, António de Melo de Castro, and the first English governor, Abraham Shipman. However, the Portuguese were able to stall the handover by a variety of pretexts, and Marlborough was obliged to land the garrison troops sent with him on Anjadip Island and return home with his ships.

In 1664 Marlborough was nominated as the next Governor of Jamaica but was shortly afterwards given command of the 70-gun second-rate Old James and was killed in 1665 at the Battle of Lowestoft while attempting to recover a captured ship.

He was succeeded in the peerages by his uncle William.

Peerage of England
Preceded by Henry Ley	Earl of Marlborough; 1638–1665	Succeeded by William Ley
