= John Bennett (fl. 1586–1589) =

English politician

John Bennett (fl. 1586–1589) was an English politician.

He was a Member (MP) of the Parliament of England for Heytesbury in 1586 and Westbury in 1589.

Parliament of England
Preceded by Lawrence Hyde; John Thynne	Member of Parliament for Heytesbury; 1586–1588; With: John Thynne	Succeeded by Francis Zouche; Joshua Elmer
Preceded by Henry Whitaker; Robert Baynard	Member of Parliament for Westbury; 1588–1593; With: Henry Fanshawe	Succeeded by Henry Fanshawe; William Jordyn
