= Robert Baynard (died 1636) =

English barrister

Sir Robert Baynard (1563–1636) was an English barrister and member of parliament.

He was the eldest son of Edward Baynard of Lackham, Wiltshire, educated at Clare College, Cambridge (1580) and trained in the law at the Middle Temple (1581). He succeeded his father in 1576 and was knighted in 1618.

He was elected a member (MP) of the parliament of England for Chippenham in 1584 and Westbury in 1586. He was on the Wiltshire bench as a Justice of the Peace by 1595 and was appointed High Sheriff of Wiltshire for 1629–30.

He married Ursula, the daughter of Sir Robert Stapleton of Wighill, Yorkshire, with whom he had a daughter.

After his death, a series of brass plaques were placed in the floor of St Cyriac's Church in Lacock, commemorating his life. These were stolen in mid-2004, but quickly returned after a national appeal by police.

Parliament of England
Preceded by William Bayley; John Scott	Member of Parliament for Chippenham; 1584–1586; With: Robert Hyde	Succeeded by Lawrence Hyde; Robert Hyde
Preceded by William Brouncker; Edward Midwinter	Member of Parliament for Westbury; 1586–1588; With: Henry Whitaker	Succeeded by Sir Henry Fanshawe; John Bennett
