= Hanham baronets =

Title in the Baronetage of England

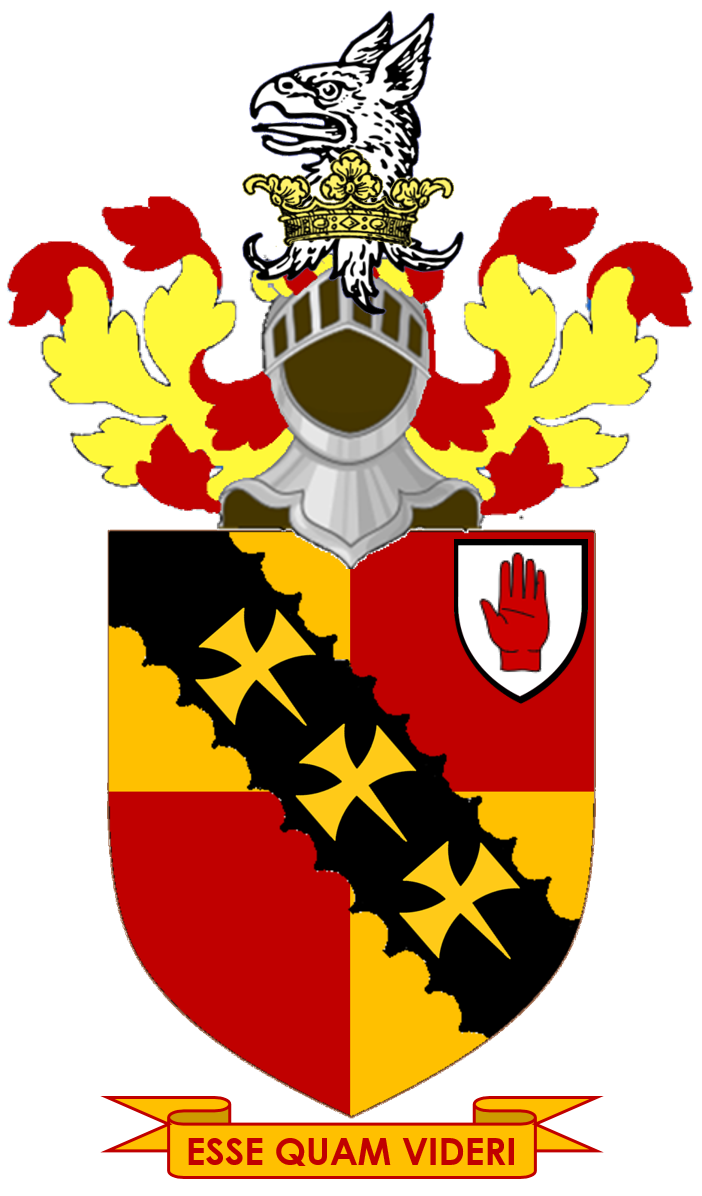
Arms: Quarterly Or and Gules on a Bend engrailed Sable three Crosses-Patée fitchée of the first: Crest: A Griffin's Head erased and ducally gorged Or; Motto: Esse Quam Videri (To be, rather than to seem)

The Hanham baronetcy, of Wimborne in the County of Dorset, is a title in the Baronetage of England. It was created on 24 May 1667 for William Hanham, a member of a Somerset family. The family seat is Deans Court in Wimborne, Dorset.

== Hanham baronets, of Wimborne (1667) ==
- Sir William Hanham, 1st Baronet (c. 1641 – c. 1671)
- Sir John Hanham, 2nd Baronet (died 1703)
- Sir William Hanham, 3rd Baronet (died 1762)
- Sir William Hanham, 4th Baronet (1718–1776)
- Sir William Thomas Hanham, 5th Baronet (1763–1791)
- Sir James Hanham, 6th Baronet (c. 1726–1806)
- Sir James Hanham, 7th Baronet (1760–1849)
- Sir William Hanham, 8th Baronet (1798–1877)
- Sir John Alexander Hanham, 9th Baronet (1854–1911)
- Sir John Ludlow Hanham, 10th Baronet (1898–1955)
- Sir Henry Phelips Hanham, 11th Baronet (1901–1973)
- Sir Michael William Hanham, 12th Baronet (1922–2009)
- Sir William John Edward Hanham, 13th Baronet (born 1957)

There is no heir to the title.
