= Earl of Marlborough =

Title in the peerage of England

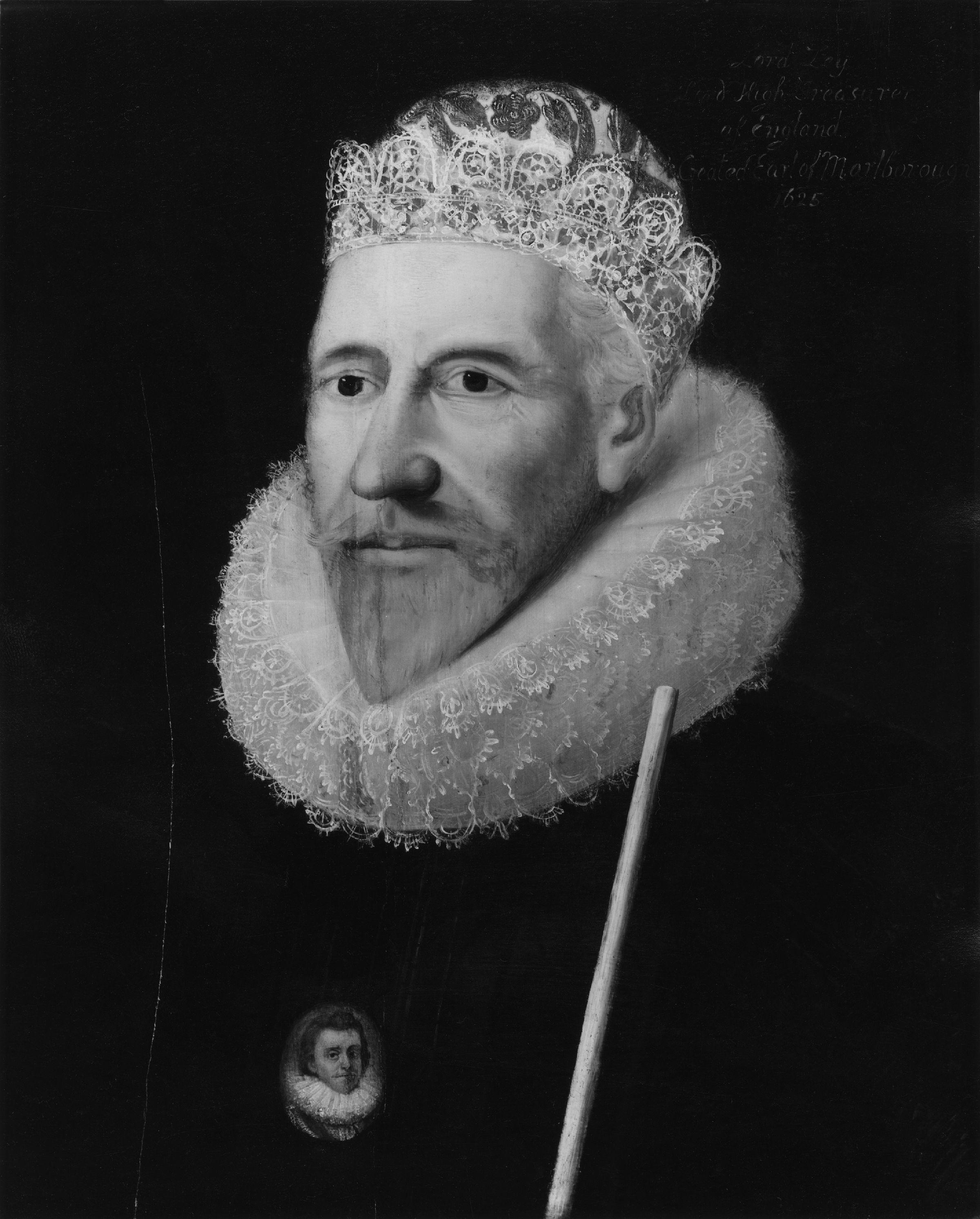
James Ley, 1st Earl of Marlborough

Earl of Marlborough is a title that has been created twice, both times in the Peerage of England. The first time was in 1626 in favour of James Ley, 1st Baron Ley, and the second was in 1689 for John Churchill, 1st Baron Churchill, the future Duke of Marlborough.

== History ==
The first creation came on 5 February 1626 in favour of James Ley, 1st Baron Ley, Lord Chief Justice and Lord High Treasurer. He had already been created a baronet, of Westbury in the County of Wiltshire, in the Baronetage of England in 1619, and Baron Ley, of Ley in the County of Devon, on 31 December 1624, in the Peerage of England. His eldest son, who served as Custos Rotulorum of Somerset, was summoned to the House of Lords as Baron Ley by writ of acceleration in 1628. He succeeded his father in the earldom the next year. He was in turn succeeded by his only son, the third Earl, in 1638. He was a naval commander and was killed at the Battle of Lowestoft in 1665. He was unmarried and was succeeded by his uncle, William Ley, who became the fourth Earl. He married Miss Hewet, daughter of Sir William Hewet, but as he died without issue, in 1679, the baronetcy, the barony, and the earldom became extinct.

The second creation came on 9 April 1689, when John Churchill, 1st Baron Churchill, was created Earl of Marlborough, in the County of Wiltshire, for his role in the Glorious Revolution. He was subsequently created Duke of Marlborough, and the earldom has since descended with the dukedom.

== Earl of Marlborough, first creation ==
=== Ley baronets (1619) ===
- James Ley, 1st Baronet (1552–1629) (created Baron Ley in 1624)

=== Baron Ley (1624) ===
- James Ley, 1st Baron Ley (1552–1629) (created Earl of Marlborough in 1626)

=== Earl of Marlborough (1626) ===
- James Ley, 1st Earl of Marlborough (1552–1629)
- Henry Ley, 2nd Baron Ley, 2nd Earl of Marlborough (1595–1638), elder son of the 1st Earl (summoned to the House of Lords as Baron Ley by writ of acceleration)
- James Ley, 3rd Earl of Marlborough (1618–1665), only son of the 2nd Earl
- William Ley, 4th Earl of Marlborough (1612–1679), younger son of the 1st Earl; married Margaret, daughter of Sir William Hewett of Beccles, Suffolk.

== Earl of Marlborough, second creation (1689) ==
- see Duke of Marlborough
