= Henry Fanshawe (1569–1616) =

English politician

Sir Henry Fanshawe (1569–1616) was a Member of the English Parliament who held the office of Remembrancer of the Exchequer.

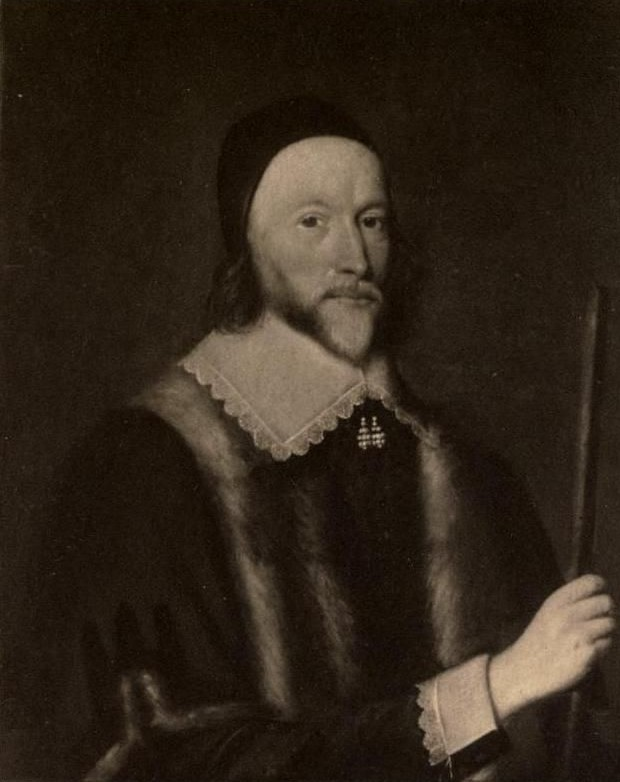
Sir Henry Fanshawe

== Early life ==
Henry Fanshawe, baptised 15 August 1569, was the elder son of Thomas Fanshawe (remembrancer of the exchequer) by his first wife, Mary, daughter of Anthony Bourchier and was thus a half-brother of Sir Thomas Fanshawe and William Fanshawe. He was educated at Peterhouse, Cambridge, earning his B.A. in 1581. Later, in November 1586, he became a student of the Inner Temple. In 1601, on his father's death, he inherited Ware Park (a mansion near Ware, Hertfordshire), a house in Warwick Lane, London, and a part of St. John's Wood, on condition that he should provide lodging with himself for his stepmother Joan and for his sisters and stepsisters until their marriage.

== Career ==
He succeeded to his father's office as remembrancer of the exchequer. According to the testimony of his daughter-in-law, Anne, wife of Sir Richard Fanshawe, Queen Elizabeth described Henry Fanshawe as "the best officer of accounts she had, and a person of great integrity".

He was elected M.P. for Westbury, Wiltshire, 1 November 1588, and again in February 1592/3. He sat for Boroughbridge, Yorkshire, in the parliament summoned in the autumn of 1597. On 7 May 1603 he was knighted by King James I shortly after his coronation.

Sir Henry was also a member of the Virginia Company. He was among the signers of the first and second charters of the new Colony of Virginia. He and his family also received several thousand acres of land as extra compensation for their investments and services.

Prince Henry was friendly with him, and had the prince lived he would doubtless have become a secretary of state. He was an enthusiastic student of Italian, and devoted much time to the rearing of horses, which he rode to advantage. Lady Fanshawe reports the course of a negotiation between him and the Earl of Exeter as to the sale of a valuable horse "for a hundred pieces". "His retinue was great, and that made him stretch his estate, which was near if not full £4,000 a year, yet when he died he left no debts upon his estate". Camden is said by Lady Fanshawe to describe Fanshawe's garden at Ware Park as unsurpassed in England for its flowers, physic-herbs, and fruits. John Chamberlain was a frequent visitor and described the building of a miniature fort in the garden, later replaced by a pool and fountain.

An ambassador from the Duke of Savoy, the Cavalier Gabaleone, stayed at Ware in 1612. The next year he sent the Fanshawes a gift of Italian cheeses made by his wife, with gloves and a perfumed fan for Lady Fanshawe, and ribbons for their children.

Fanshawe maintained a musical establishment and was a patron of the composer John Ward, who dedicated a book of madrigals to him in 1613.

In December 1613 one of his servants called Swinborne won and lost £1,100 playing dice at the Three Tuns in Newgate Market, and killed himself with poison.

== Private life ==
He died suddenly, at the age of forty-eight, at Ware, early in 1616, and was buried in St Mary's Church there 12 March. "He was", writes his daughter-in-law, "as handsome and as fine a gentleman as England then had, a most excellent husband, father, friend, and servant to his prince".

Fanshawe had married Elizabeth, daughter of Thomas Smythe of Ostenhanger, Kent, by whom he had six sons and four daughters:

- Thomas
- Henry (baptised 21 September 1600)
- Simon (1604–1678)
- Walter (baptised 1 September 1605)
- Richard (1608–1666) married Anne, Lady Fanshawe
- Michael (baptised 23 June 1611)
- Alice
- Mary
- Joan (baptised 4 January 1606–7)
- Anne (baptised 6 August 1609)

His widow, who was born in 1577, and whose virtues are highly commended by Ann, Lady Fanshawe, her daughter-in-law, survived till 1631, being buried at Ware 3 June.

Sir Henry's will (dated 13 November 1613, and proved April 1616) opens with a long profession of attachment to the Protestant religion, and appoints his widow, her brother Sir Richard Smith, and his eldest son, Thomas, afterwards first Viscount Fanshawe, executors. Among his property mention is made of pictures in oil, prints, drawings, medals, engraved stones, armour, books, and musical instruments, most of which were to be removed from his London house in Warwick Lane to Ware Park, and there to remain for ever as heirlooms. Lady Fanshawe's will, dated 20 February 1629–30, was proved 2 June 1631.

== Notes ==
Parliament of England
Preceded by Robert Baynard; Henry Whitaker	Member of Parliament for Westbury; 1588–1597; With: John Bennett 1588–93; William Jordyn 1593–97	Succeeded by Matthew Ley; James Ley
Preceded by John Brograve; Vincent Skinner	Member of Parliament for Boroughbridge; 1597–1601; With: Thomas Crompton	Succeeded by Thomas Fairfax; Richard Whalley
