= Pepperman House =

Historic house in Alabama, United States

- U.S. National Register of Historic Places
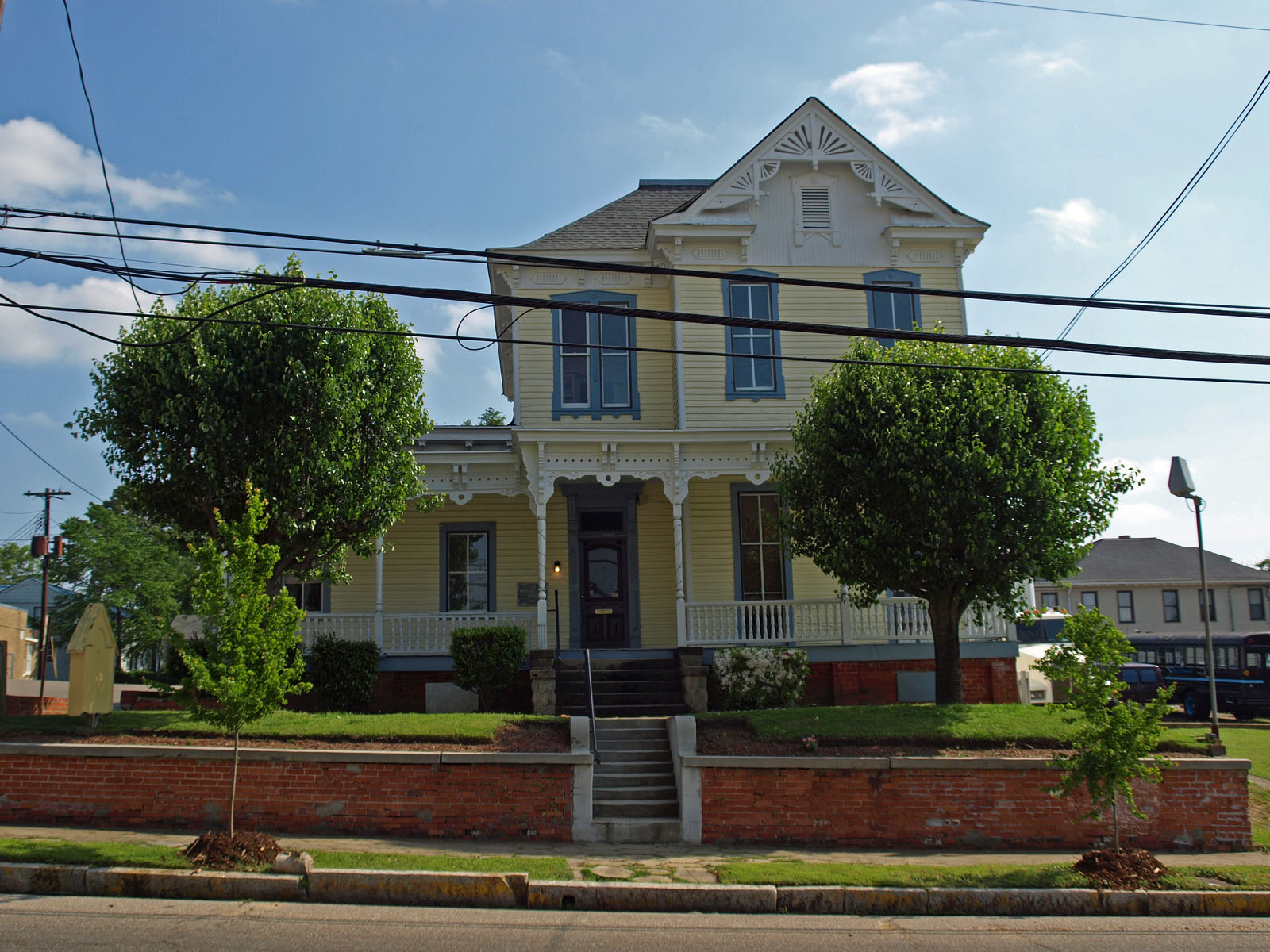
- The Pepperman House in 2009

- Location within Alabama Location within the United States
- Location: 17 Mildred St., Montgomery, Alabama
- Coordinates: 32°22′14″N 86°18′33″W
- Area: less than one acre
- Built: 1887
- Architectural style: Stick/eastlake
- NRHP reference No.: 82002065
- Added to NRHP: March 1, 1982

The Pepperman House (also known as the Ludlow House) is a historic house located at 17 Mildred Street in Montgomery, Alabama.

== Description and history ==
It was built from 1887 to 1888 for M.E. Pepperman, a pawnbroker. Shortly after, they sold it to Effingham Wagner, a dentist, who sold it to Robert M. Henderson in 1890. Henderson was the co-owner of Vandiver and Company, a wholesale grocer's, with his brother-in-law, W. F. Vandiver. By 1913, Frances M. Perry, his wife and their seven children moved into the house, until they sold it to William R. Ludlow and Richard G. Ludlow in 1943. In the 1970s, William R. Ludlow, Jr. turned it into an antique store, until he sold it to the Aronov Realty Company in 1979.

It was listed on the National Register of Historic Places on March 1, 1982.
