= Matthew Ley =

English landowner and politician

Matthew Ley (1545–1636) was an English landowner and politician who sat in the House of Commons from 1597 to 1614.

Ley was the second son of Henry Ley. In 1578 he and his brother James purchased the manor of Brembridge, near Westbury in Wiltshire, and he later acquired Heywood, north of Westbury. In 1597, he was elected Member of Parliament for Westbury. He was re-elected in 1601 and in 1604, and again in 1614. In 1623 he succeeded to the property of his brother William.

Ley married Margaret Foster, widow of Sir Humphrey Foster and daughter of Mr Barret of Essex, in 1602.

Parliament of England
Preceded by Henry Fanshawe; William Jordyn	Member of Parliament for Westbury; 1597–1614; With: Sir James Ley 1597; Henry Jackman 1601; Sir James Ley 1604; Alexander Choke; Henry Ley 1614	Succeeded by Sir James Ley; Sir Miles Fleetwood
