= Earl Ludlow =

Earl Ludlow was a title in the Peerage of Ireland, created on 3 October 1760 for Peter Ludlow, 1st Baron Ludlow. He had already been created Baron Ludlow, of Ardsalla in the County of Meath, on 19 December 1755, and was made Viscount Preston, of Ardsalla in the County of Meath, at the same time as he was given the earldom. He subsequently represented Huntingdonshire in Parliament and served as Comptroller of the Household from 1782 to 1784. Ludlow was the great-grandson of Henry Ludlow, brother of the Parliamentarian general Edmund Ludlow. His mother was Mary, daughter of John Preston (of the Viscounts Gormanston), hence his choice of title for the viscountcy. Lord Ludlow was succeeded by his eldest son, the second Earl. He died unmarried and was succeeded by his only brother, the third Earl. He was a General in the British Army. In 1831 he was created Baron Ludlow in the Peerage of the United Kingdom. The titles became extinct on his death in 1842.

== Earls Ludlow (1760) ==
- Peter Ludlow, 1st Earl Ludlow (1730–1803)
- Augustus Ludlow, 2nd Earl Ludlow (1755–1811)
- George James Ludlow, 3rd Earl Ludlow (1758–1842)

== See also ==
- Baron Ludlow
