= George Ludlow, 3rd Earl Ludlow =

British Army officer (1758–1842)

General The Right Honourable The Earl Ludlow GCB
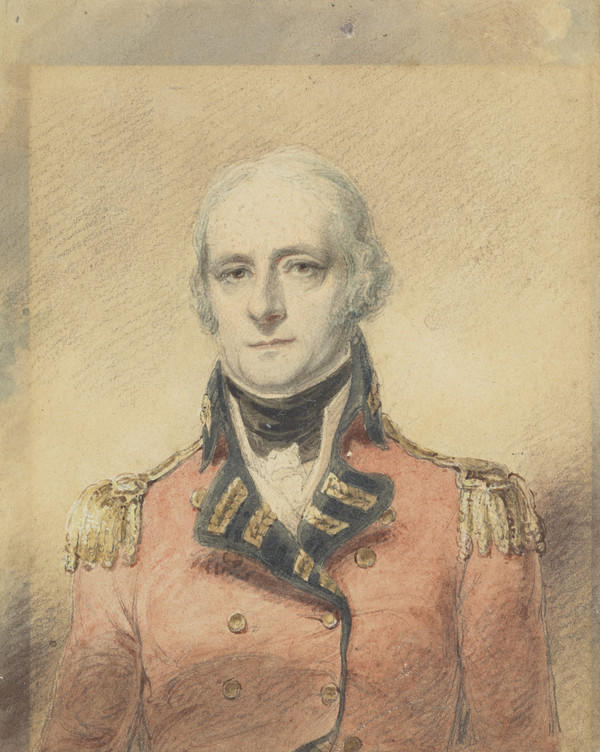
- Portrait attributed to Philip James de Loutherbourg, c. 1802
- Born: 12 December 1758
- Died: 16 April 1842 (aged 83); Cople Hall, Bedford
- Military career
- Allegiance: Great Britain; United Kingdom
- Branch: British Army
- Service years: 1778–1842
- Rank: General
- Unit: 1st Regiment of Foot Guards
- Commands: Brigade of Guards
- Conflicts: American War of Independence; Siege of Yorktown; French Revolutionary Wars; Flanders campaign; Battle of Tourcoing; French invasion of Egypt and Syria; Battle of Abukir (1801); Battle of Mandora; Battle of Alexandria (1801); Siege of Alexandria (1801); Napoleonic Wars; Hanover Expedition; Battle of Copenhagen (1807)
- Awards: Knight Grand Cross of the Order of the Bath
- Other work: Equerry to the Prince of Wales; Lieutenant-Governor of Berwick-upon-Tweed

General George James Ludlow, 3rd Earl Ludlow, GCB (12 December 1758 – 16 April 1842) was a British Army officer who served in the American War of Independence and French Revolutionary and Napoleonic Wars.

== Military service ==
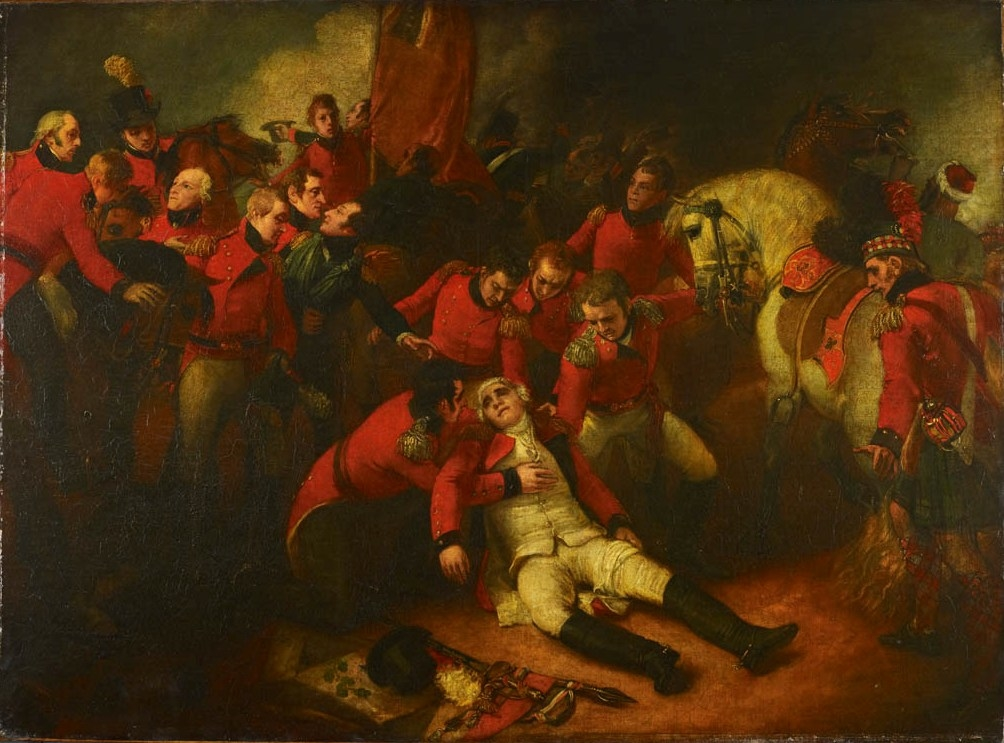
Ludlow depicted (center of three) watching over the mortally wounded Sir Ralph Abercromby at the Battle of Alexandria

Ludlow served in the British Army as a captain during the American War of Independence. Following the British surrender at Yorktown, he was held as a prisoner of war in Lancaster, Pennsylvania. In May 1782, he was one of 13 British prisoners forced to draw lots to determine which one should be executed in retaliation for the summary execution of a Patriot captain by Loyalists, in what became known as the Asgill Affair. He rose to Colonel of the 1st Foot Guards 21 August 1795, and Major General 18 June 1798. In 1801 he served under Ralph Abercromby and John Hely-Hutchinson in the Egyptian campaign commanding the Guards Brigade, seeing action at the battles of Abukir and Alexandria. He was made Lieutenant General on 30 October 1805. In August 1807 he commanded the 3rd Division in the Battle of Copenhagen under Lord Cathcart. Ludlow was promoted General in June 1814.

He was a Regimental Colonel in turn of the 96th Regiment of Foot, the 38th (1st Staffordshire) Regiment of Foot and the Scots Fusiliers.

== Family and peerage ==
Ludlow was the younger son of Peter Ludlow, 1st Earl Ludlow, by Lady Frances, daughter of Thomas Lumley-Saunderson, 3rd Earl of Scarbrough. Ludlow succeeded his elder brother Augustus in the earldom in 1811. As this was an Irish peerage it did not entitle him to a seat in the House of Lords. However, in 1831 he was created Baron Ludlow in the Peerage of the United Kingdom, which enabled him to take a seat in the upper chamber of parliament.

Lord Ludlow died in April 1842, aged 83. He was unmarried and all his titles became extinct on his death.

Military offices
New regiment	Colonel of the 96th Regiment of Foot; 1804–1805	Succeeded by Sir George Don
Preceded by James Rooke	Colonel of the 38th (1st Staffordshire) Regiment of Foot; 1805–1836	Succeeded by Sir Charles Greville
Preceded by The Duke of Gordon	Colonel of the Scots Fusilier Guards; 1836–1842	Succeeded by The Duke of Saxony
Peerage of Ireland
Preceded by Augustus Ludlow	Earl Ludlow; 1811–1842	Extinct
Preceded by Augustus Ludlow	Viscount Preston; 1811–1842	Extinct
Preceded by Augustus Ludlow	Baron Ludlow; 1811–1842	Extinct
Peerage of the United Kingdom
New creation	Baron Ludlow; 1831–1842	Extinct
