= Henry Ley, 2nd Earl of Marlborough =

English peer and Member of Parliament

The Right Honourable Sir Henry Ley
- Earl of Marlborough
- Tenure: 1629–1638
- Predecessor: James Ley, 1st Earl of Marlborough
- Successor: James Ley, 3rd Earl of Marlborough
- Other titles: Baron Ley
- Born: 3 December 1595
- Died: 1 April 1638 (aged 42)
- Spouse: Mary Capell
- Issue: Lady Elizabeth Ley; James Ley, 3rd Earl of Marlborough
- Father: James Ley, 1st Earl of Marlborough
- Mother: Mary Petty

Henry Ley, 2nd Earl of Marlborough (3 December 1595 – 1 April 1638), was an English hereditary peer and Member of Parliament.

He was baptised on 3 December 1595, the eldest son of James Ley, a barrister and his first wife, Mary (née Petty). His father became a judge in 1603. Following in his father's footsteps, he was admitted to Lincoln's Inn in January 1610 and was called to the bar in 1616.

Ley was knighted in 1611 by James I. He was a Member (MP) of the Parliament of England for Westbury in 1614 and 1624, for Devizes in 1621 and 1626 – 2 March 1626 and for Wiltshire in 1625. He a Justice of the peace in Somerset from 1618 and Wiltshire from 1622, he was appointed Custos Rotulorum of Somerset for life in 1625.

His father had been created Baron Ley in 1624. When his father was created Earl of Marlborough in 1628, as his eldest son he entered the House of Lords by a writ of acceleration as Baron Ley. He succeeded his father as Earl of Marlborough the following year.

Ley married Mary, daughter of Sir Arthur Capell of Little Hadham, by whom he had two children:

- Lady Elizabeth Ley, died unmarried
- James Ley, 3rd Earl of Marlborough (1618–1665)

By the time of his death he was estranged from his wife, who subsequently married his estate steward.

Political offices
Preceded by The Lord Ley	Custos Rotulorum of Somerset; 1625–1636	Succeeded by John Coventry
Peerage of England
Preceded by James Ley	Earl of Marlborough; 1629–1638	Succeeded by James Ley
Preceded by James Ley	Baron Ley (by writ of acceleration); 1628–1638; Member of the House of Lords (1628–1638)	Succeeded by James Ley
