= Baron Ludlow =

Extinct titles in the Peerage of Ireland and the Peerage of the United Kingdom

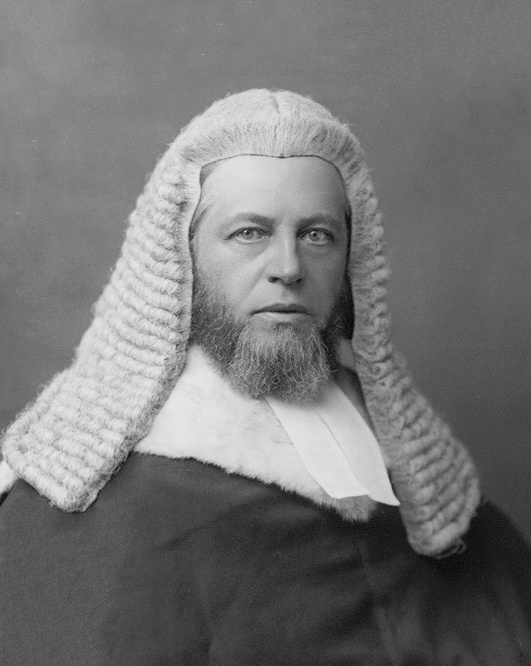
Henry Lopes, 1st Baron Ludlow.

Baron Ludlow was a title that was created three times in British history, once in the Peerage of Ireland and twice in the Peerage of the United Kingdom. For the first two creations, see Earl Ludlow. The third creation came in the Peerage of the United Kingdom on 26 July 1897 when the politician and judge Sir Henry Lopes was made Baron Ludlow, of Heywood in the County of Wiltshire. He was a younger son of Sir Ralph Lopes, 2nd Baronet, of Maristow, and the uncle of Henry Lopes, 1st Baron Roborough (see Baron Roborough for earlier history of the family). Lord Ludlow was succeeded by his only son, the second Baron. He was a barrister and member of the London County Council. He was childless and the title became extinct on his death in 1922.

== Barons Ludlow; First creation (1755) ==
- see Earl Ludlow

== Barons Ludlow; Second creation (1831) ==
- see Earl Ludlow

== Barons Ludlow; Third creation (1897) ==
- Henry Charles Lopes, 1st Baron Ludlow (1828–1899)
- Henry Ludlow Lopes, 2nd Baron Ludlow (1865–1922)

== See also ==
- Baron Roborough
