= Augustus Ludlow =

Augustus C. Ludlow (1 January 1792 – 13 June 1813) was an officer in the United States Navy during the War of 1812.

Ludlow was born in Newburgh, New York. He was appointed midshipman April 2, 1804, and commissioned lieutenant June 3, 1810. Ludlow was second in command to Captain James Lawrence on the USS Chesapeake during the ship's engagement with HMS Shannon on June 1, 1813. It was to Ludlow that Lawrence said "Don't give up the ship." Both Ludlow and Lawrence were mortally wounded in that battle, and Ludlow died in Halifax, Nova Scotia, on June 13, 1813.

Lieutenant Ludlow is interred, together with Captain James Lawrence and Lawrence's widow, in the graveyard of Trinity Church in Manhattan, New York City.

== Namesakes and honors ==
- See USS Ludlow for ships named in his honor.
- Port Ludlow, Washington, was named in his honor by Charles Wilkes in 1842.
- Ludlow Street in Manhattan, New York City
- Ludlow Road in Commodore Perry Village, Middletown, Rhode Island
