= List of MPs elected to the English parliament in April 1640 =

The Short Parliament at Westminster began on 13 April 1640, and was held until 5 May. It sat for only 28 days, and was then dissolved. It was followed by the Long Parliament which began sitting in November 1640. Because of the short duration, several electoral disputes were not resolved before it was dissolved so in some instances there is an extra representative recorded.

== List of constituencies and members ==
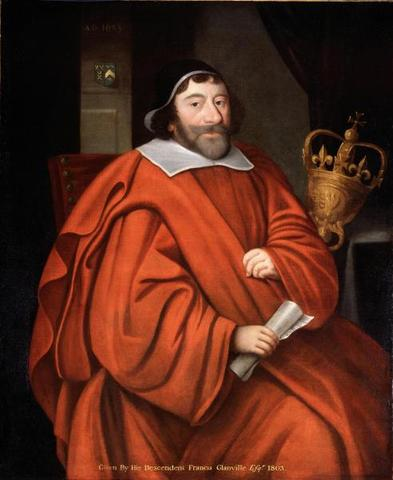
Sir John Glanville – Bristol (Speaker)

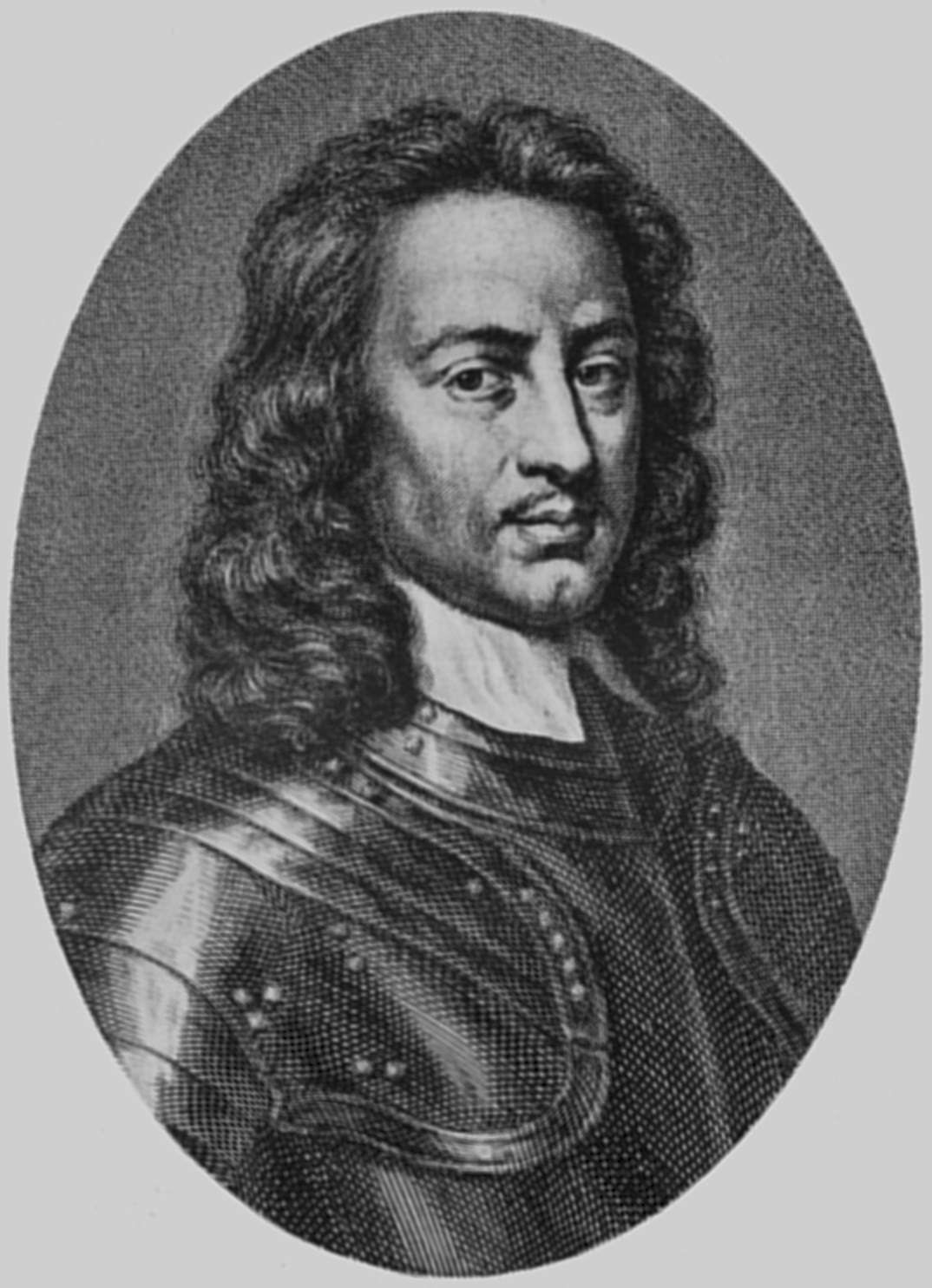
John Hampden – Buckinghamshire

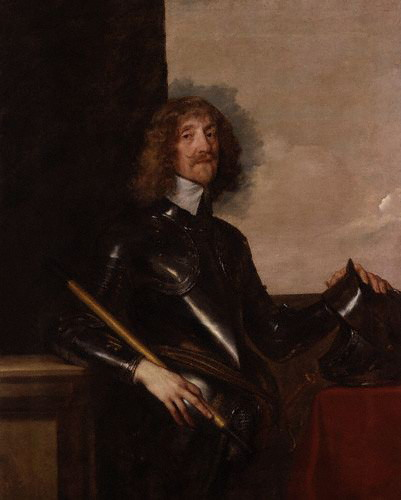
Sir Edmund Verney – Wycombe

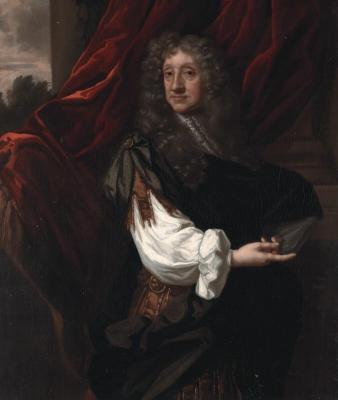
Sir Ralph Verney, 1st Bt – Aylesbury

Oliver Cromwell – Cambridge

Major General Sir William Brereton – Cheshire

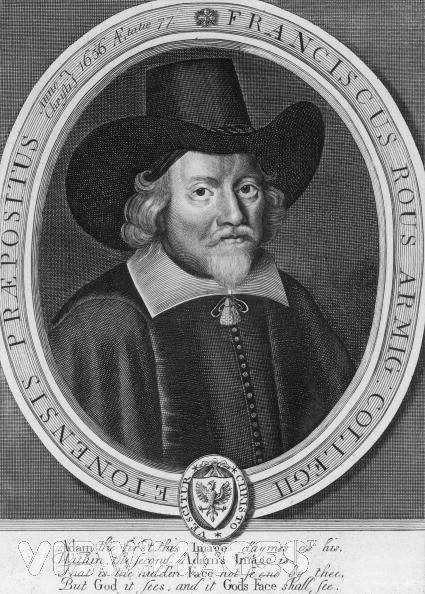
Francis Rous – Truro

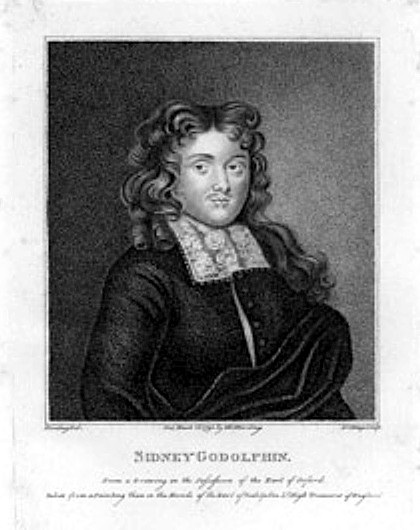
Sidney Godolphin – Helston

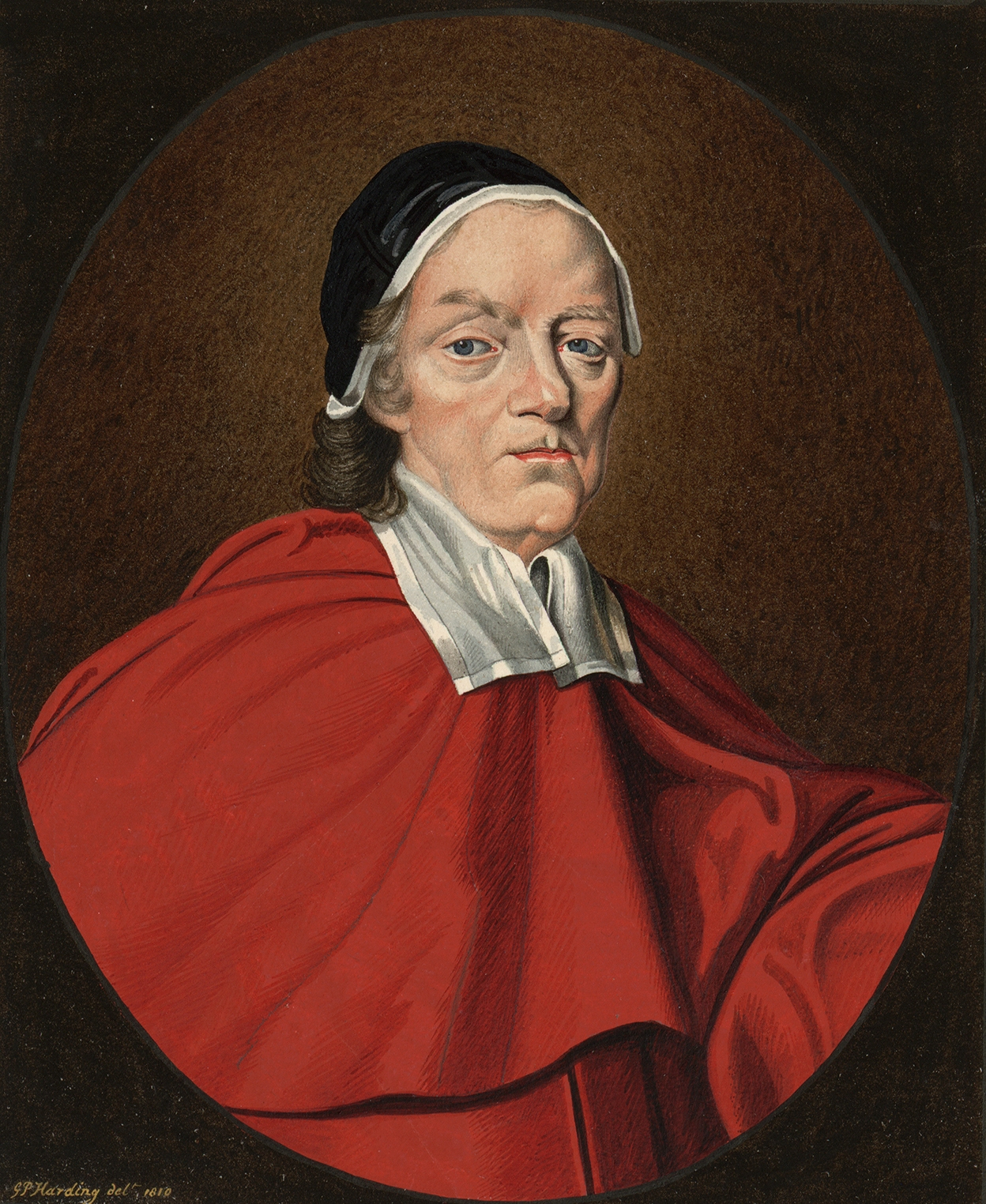
Sir John Maynard – Totnes

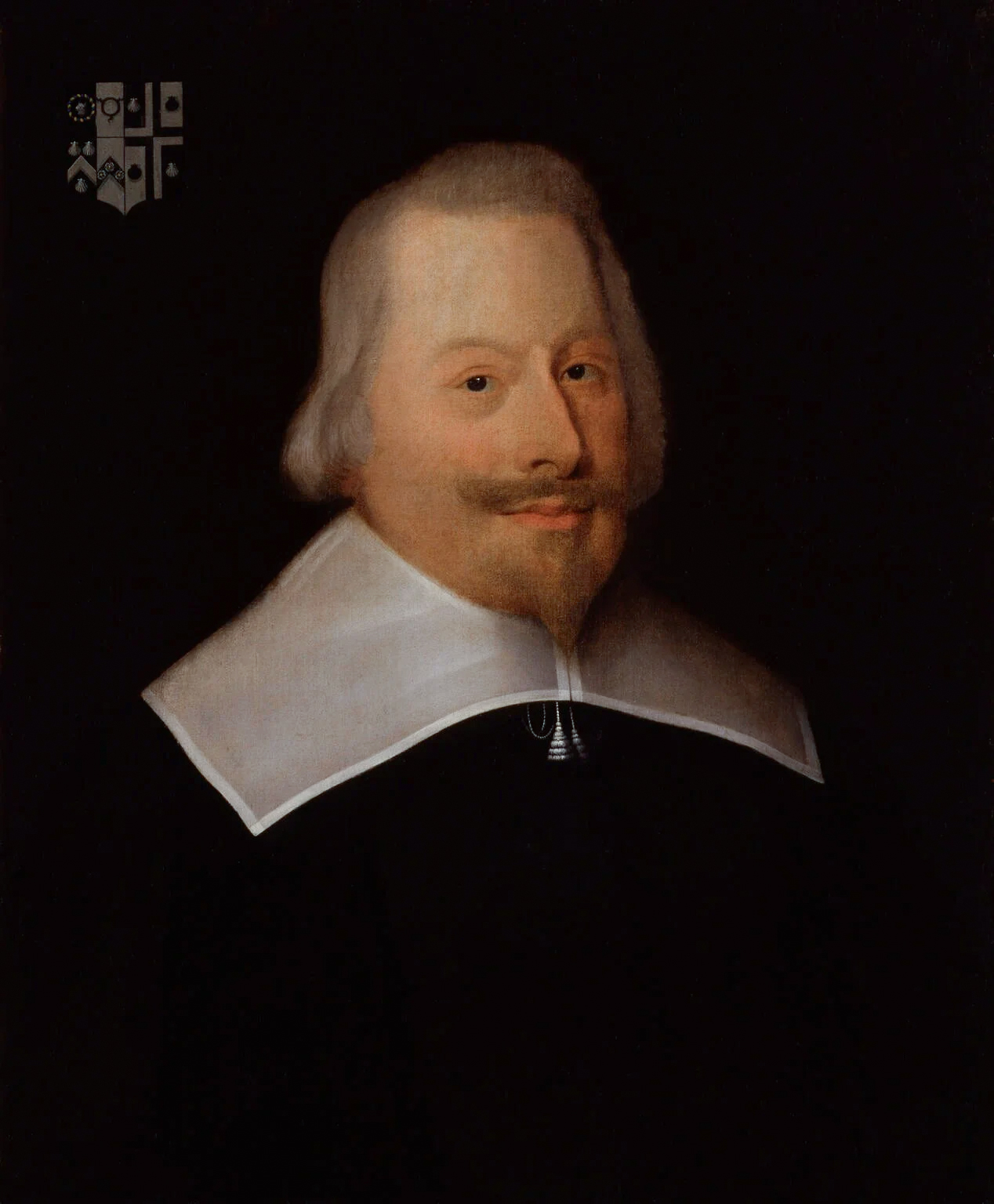
John Pym – Tavistock

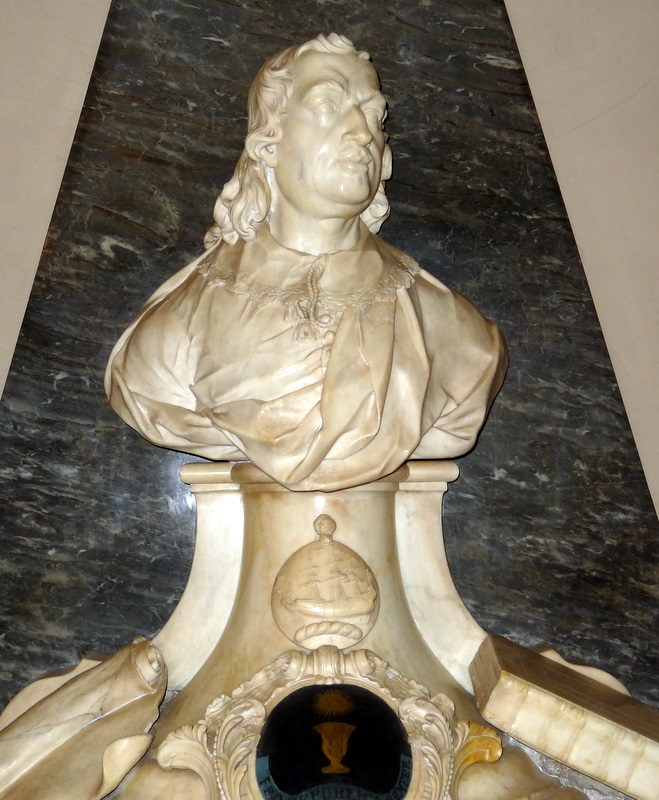
Samuel Vassal – Middlesex - City of London

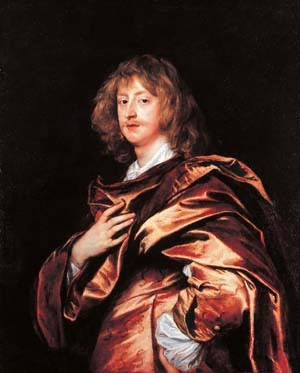
George Lord Digby – Dorset

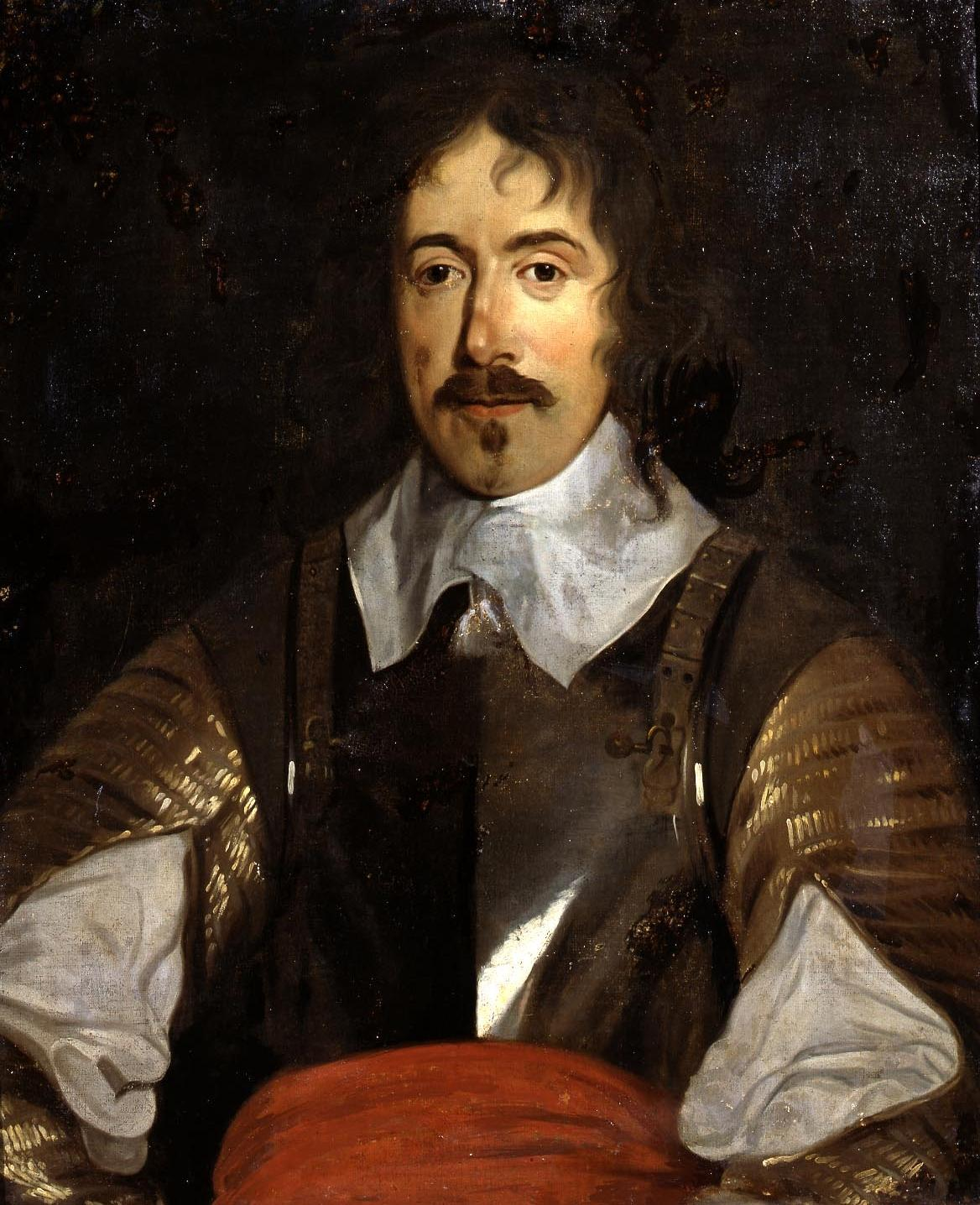
Denzil Holles – Dorchester

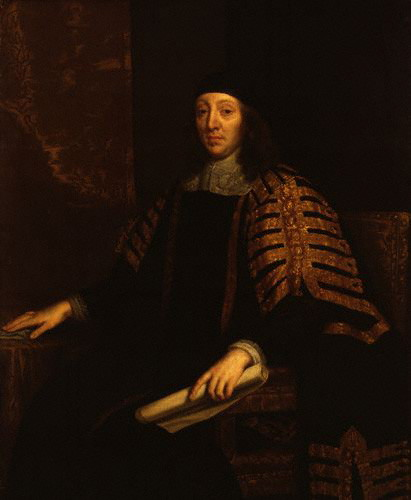
Harbottle Grimston (younger) – Colchester

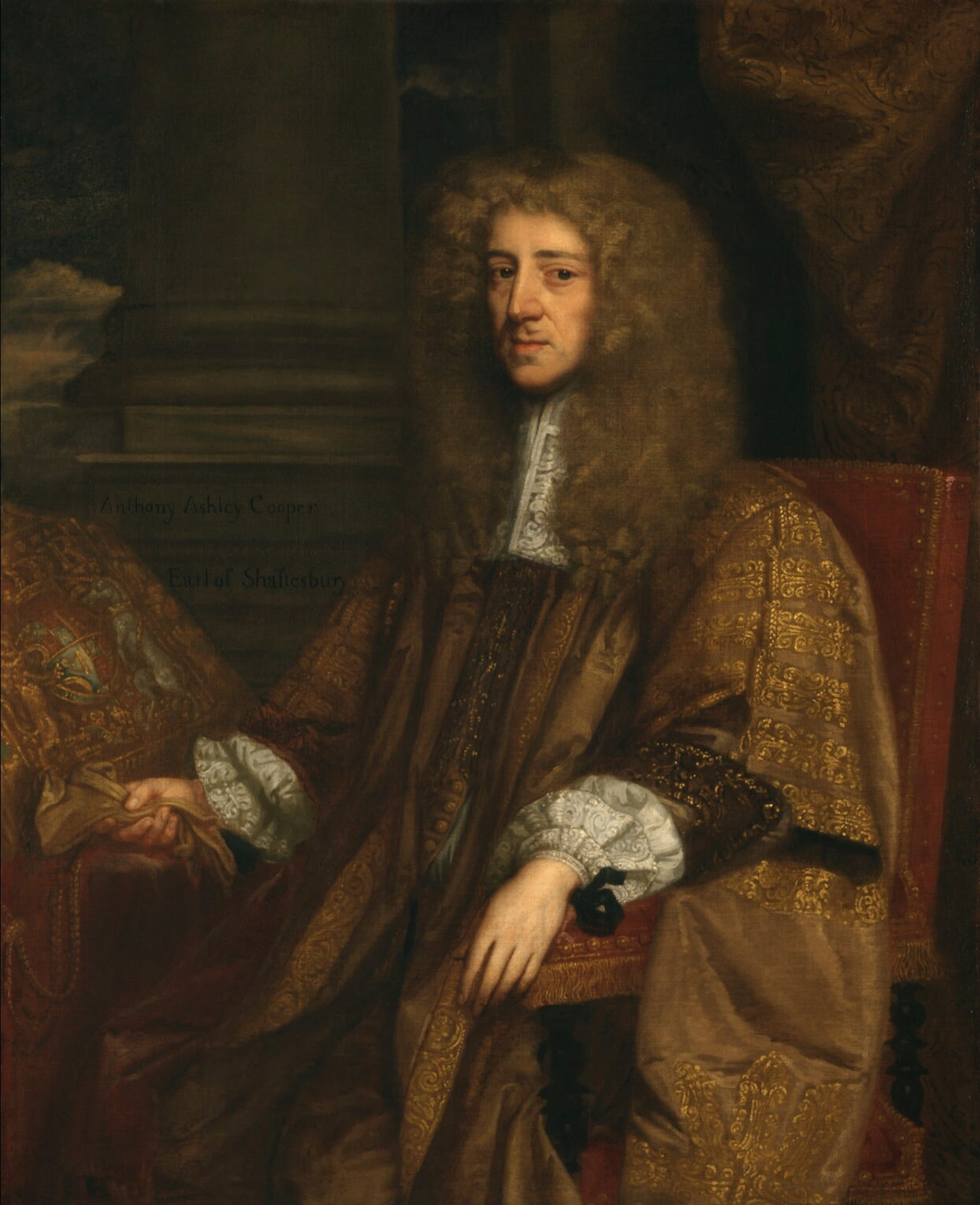
Sir Anthony Ashley-Cooper – Tewkesbury

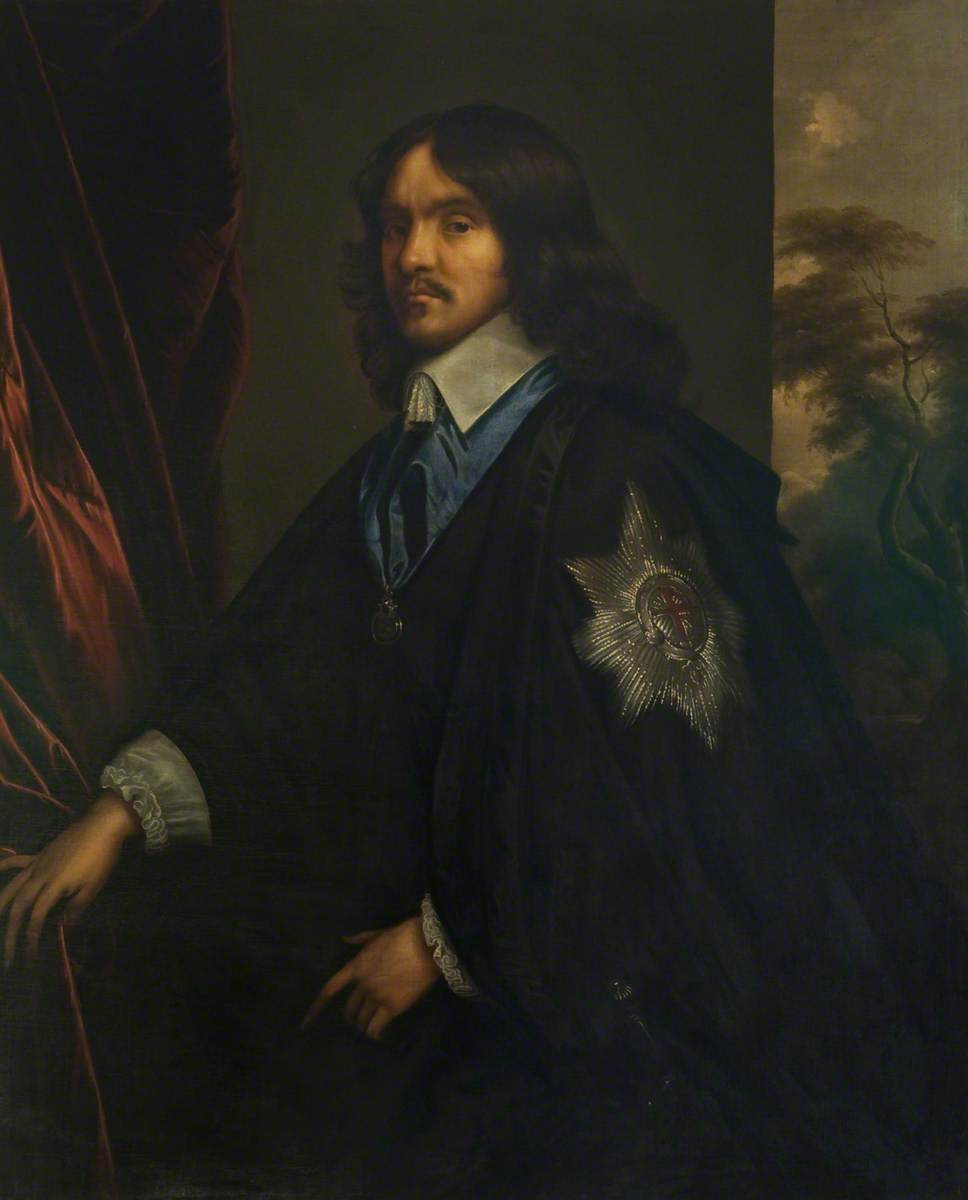
William Hamilton – Portsmouth

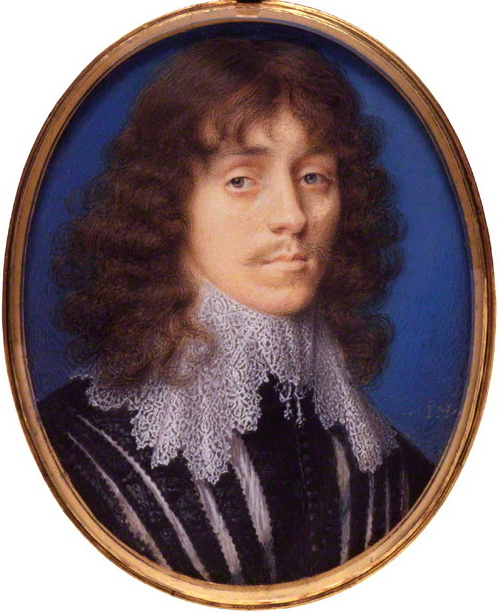
Lucius Carey, Viscount Falkland – Newport

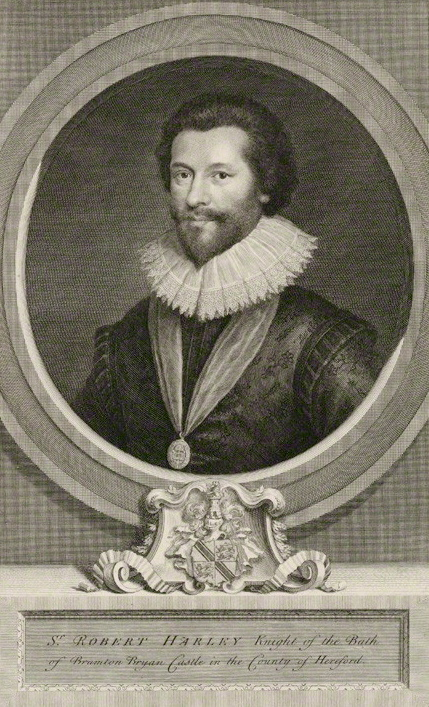
Sir Robert Harley – Herefordshire

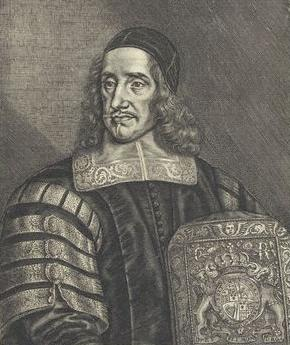
Sir Orlando Bridgeman – Wigan

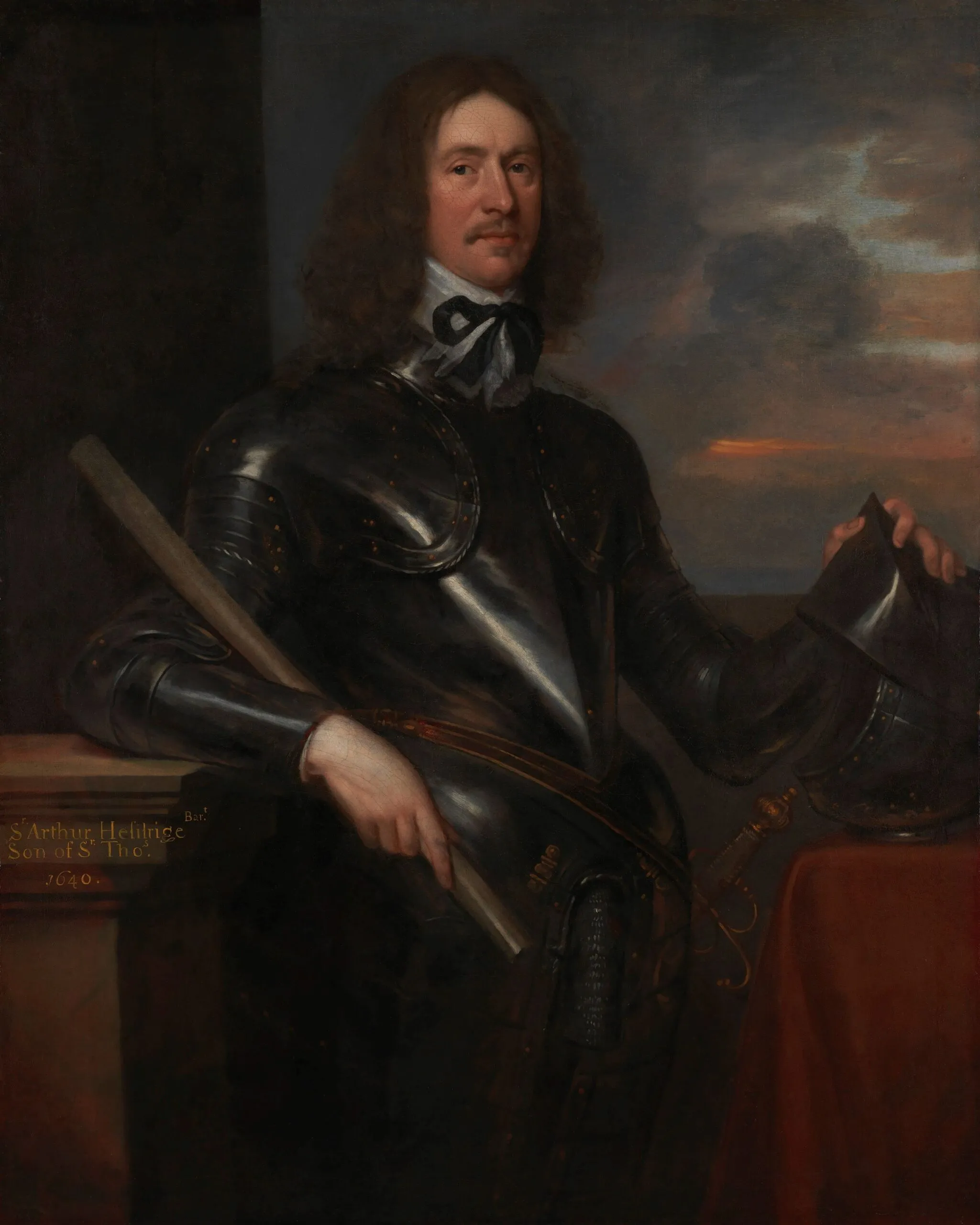
Sir Arthur Haselrig – Leicestershire

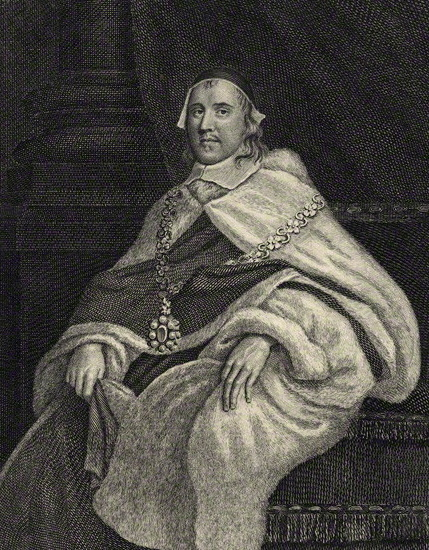
Sir John Glynne – Westminster

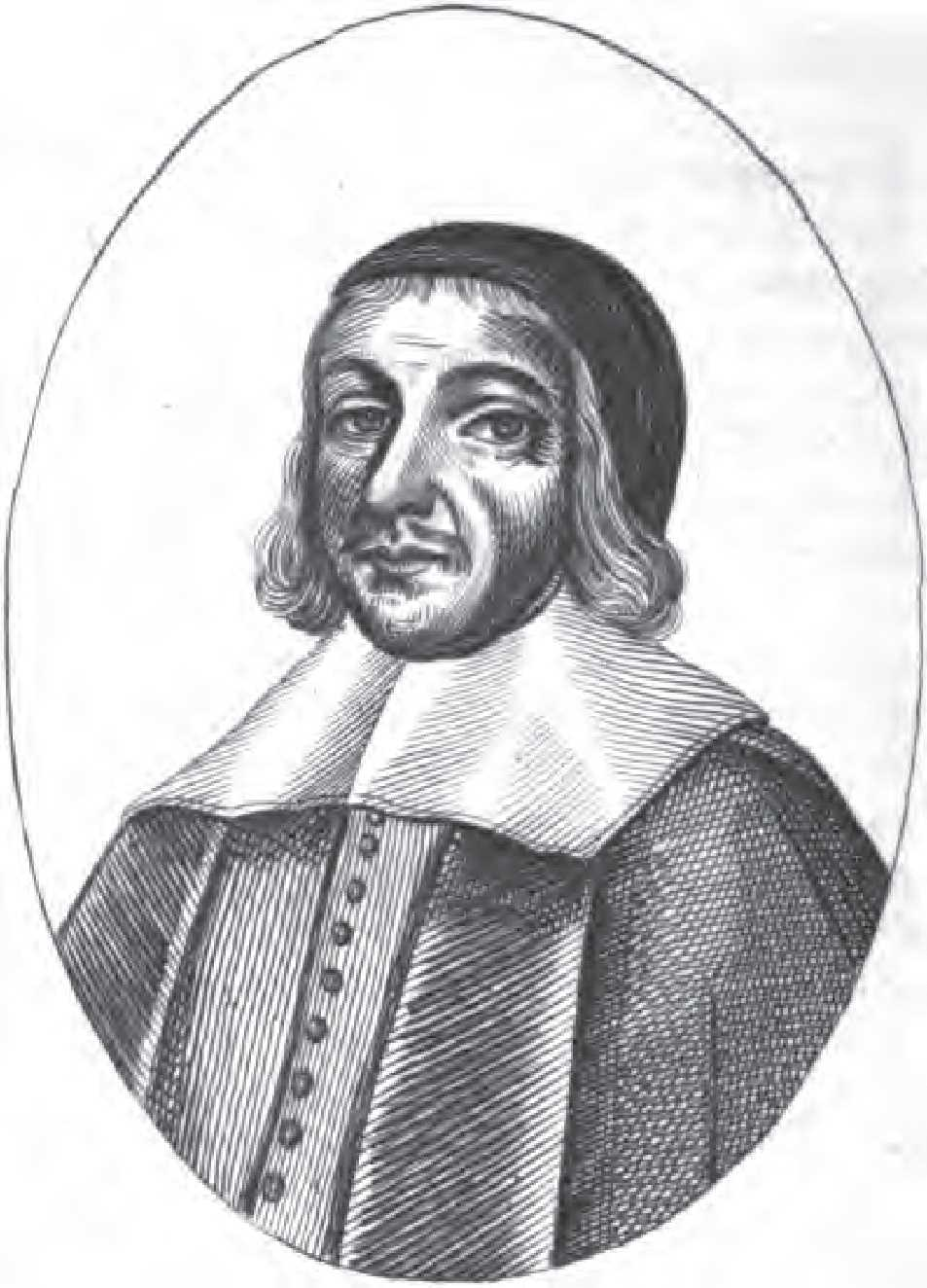
Miles Corbett – Great Yarmouth

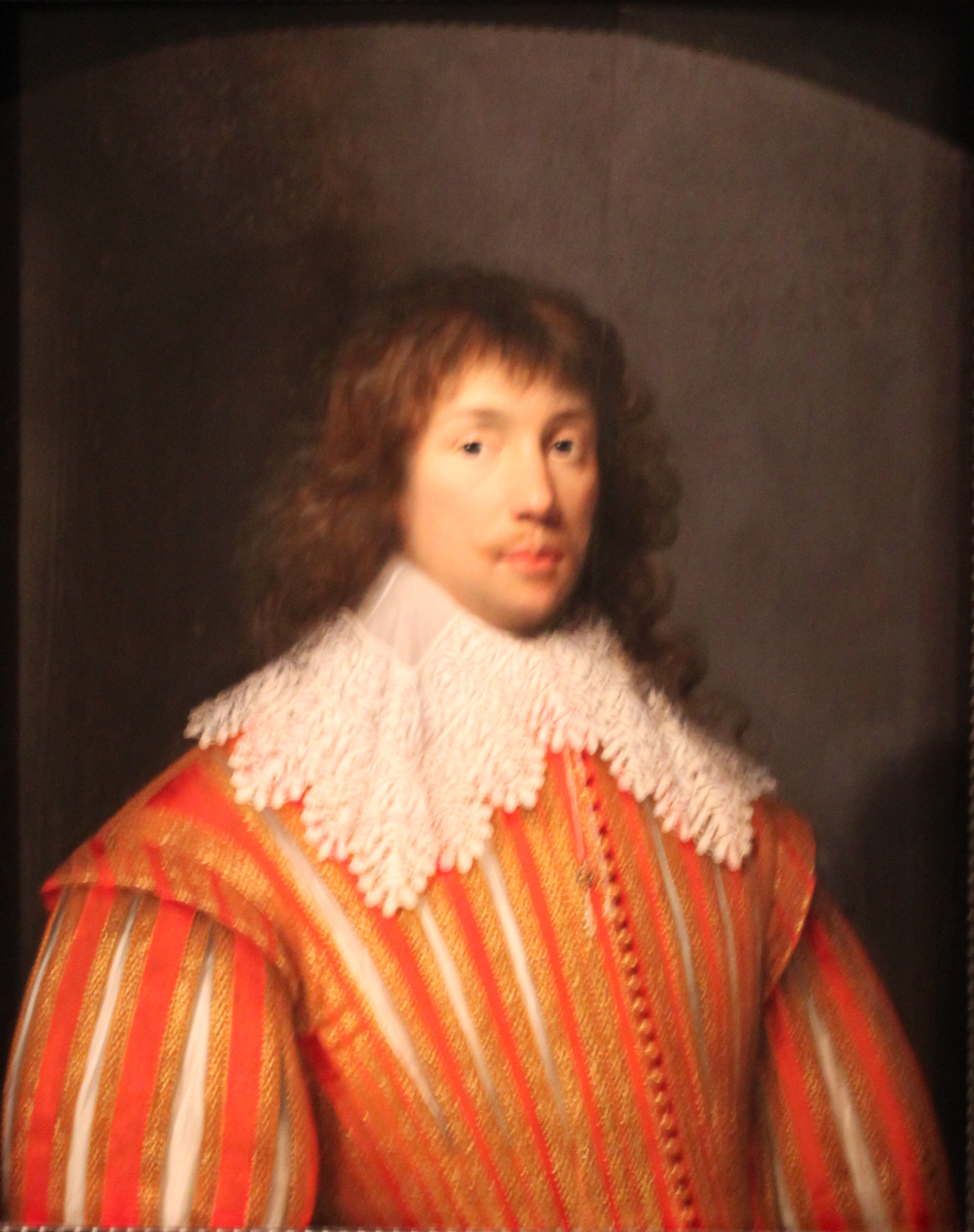
William Fitzwilliam – Peterborough

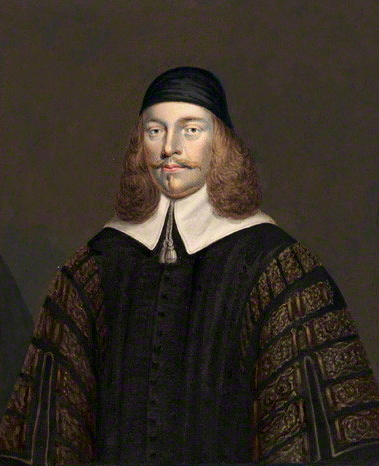
Sir Thomas Widdrington – Berwick upon Tweed

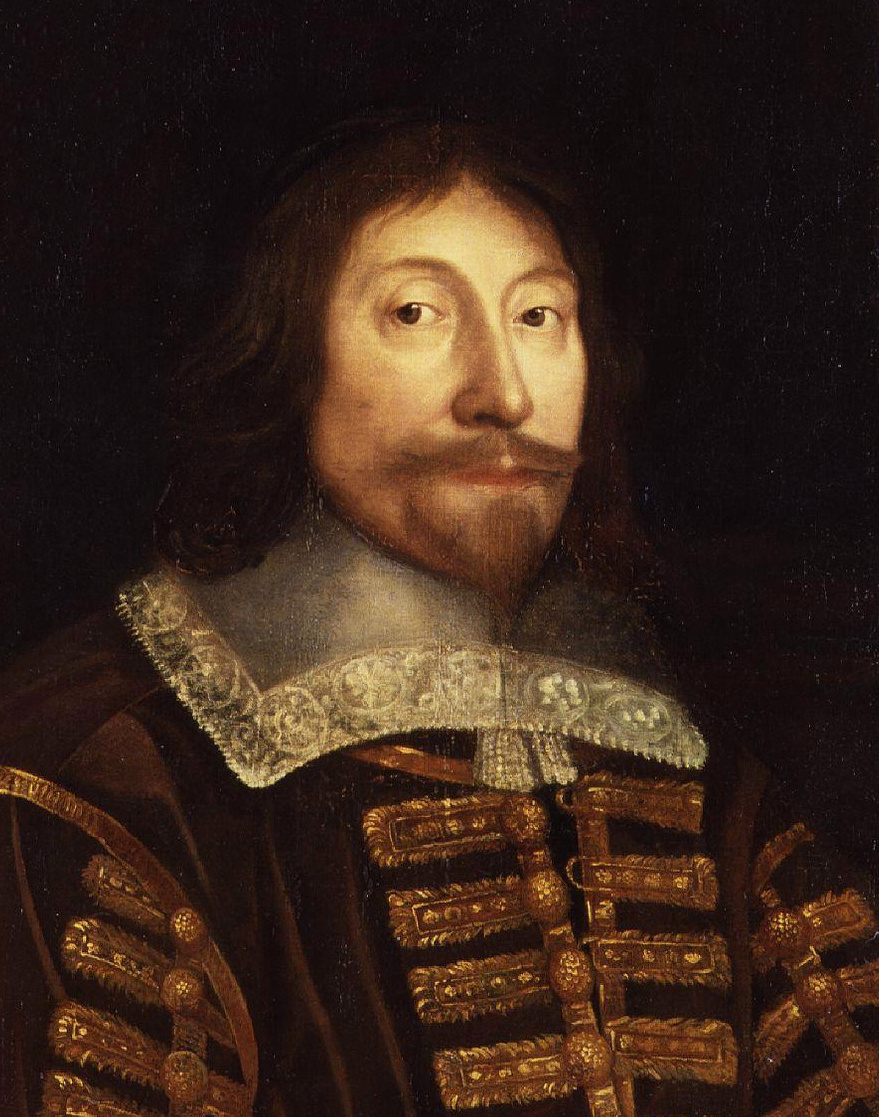
William Lenthall – Woodstock

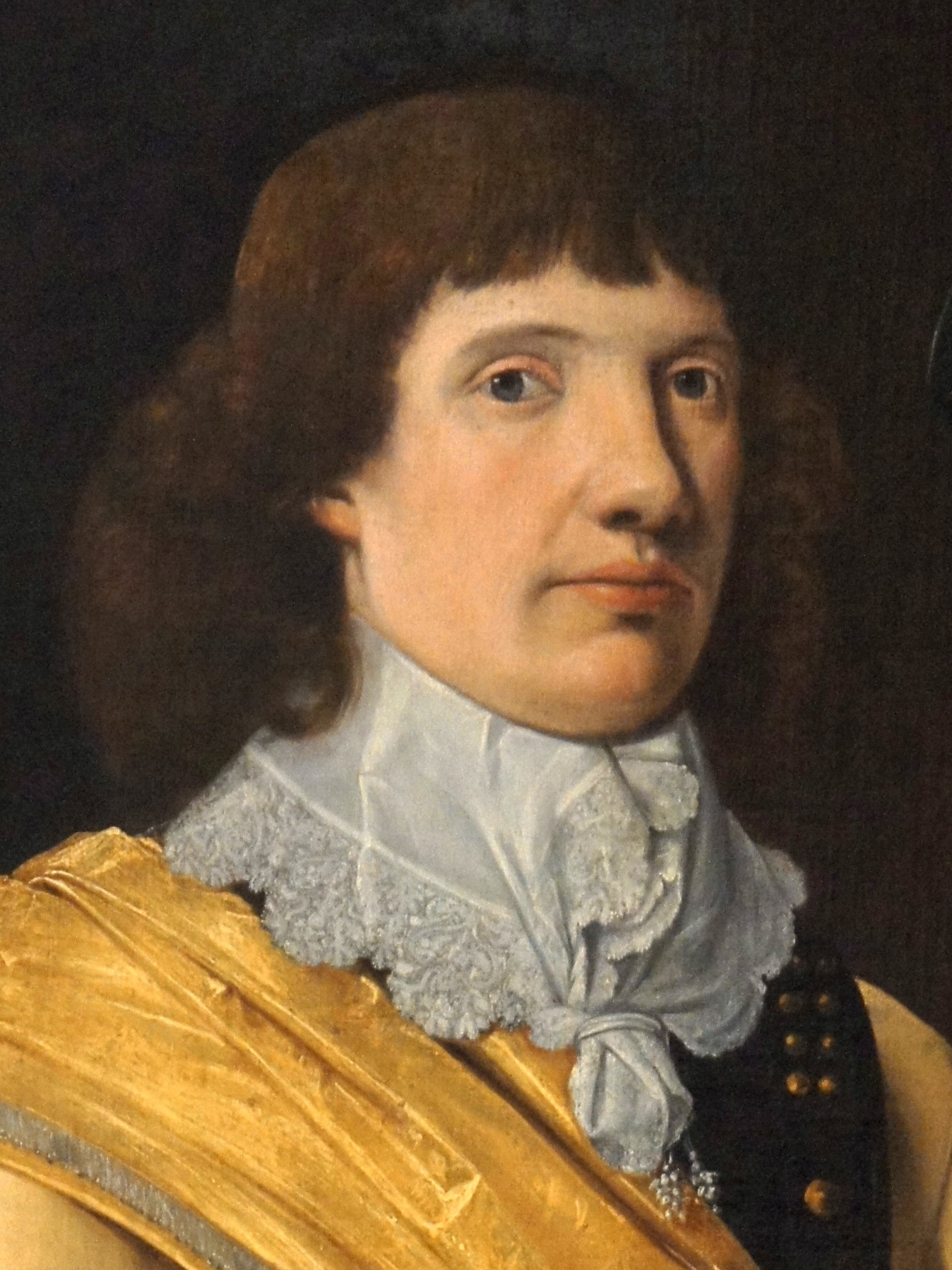
Nathaniel Fiennes – Banbury

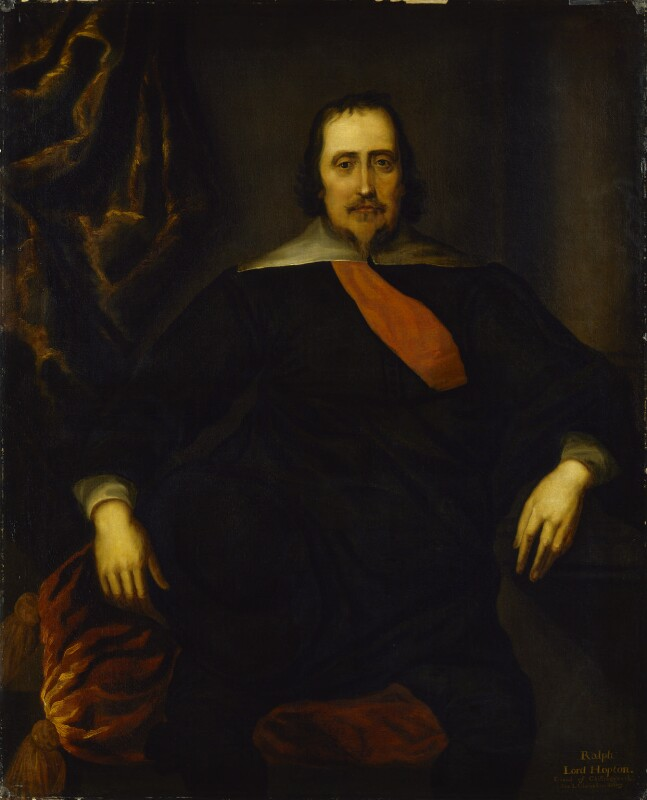
Sir Ralph Hopton – Somerset

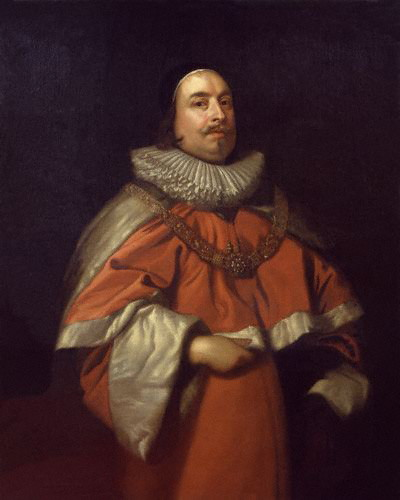
Sir Edward Littleton, 1st Baronet – Staffordshire

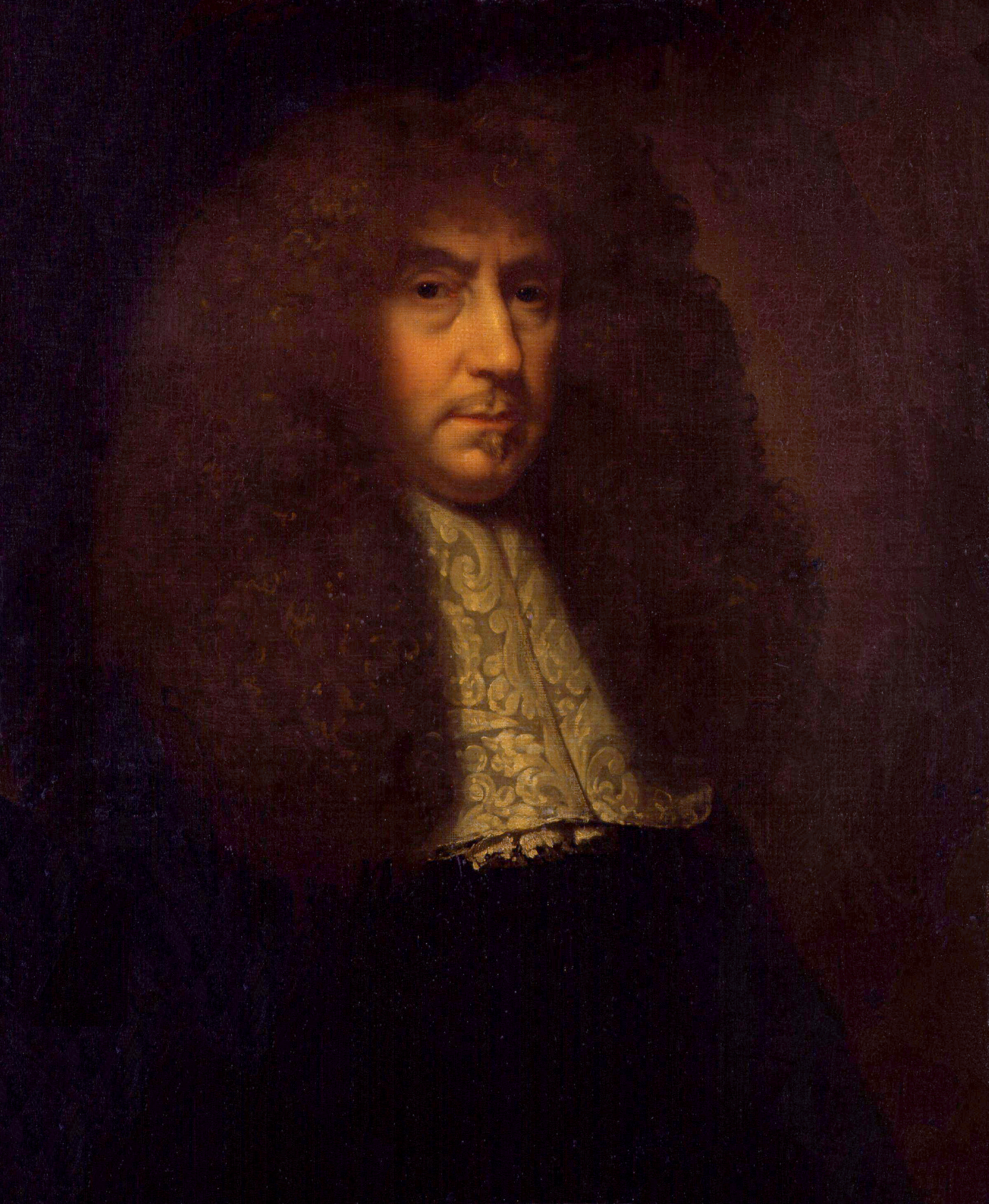
Sir Robert Long, 1st Baronet – Midhurst

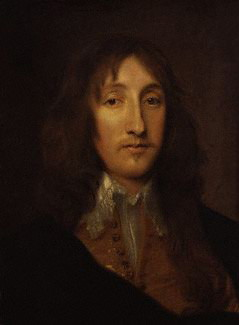
Richard Viscount Dungarvon – Appleby

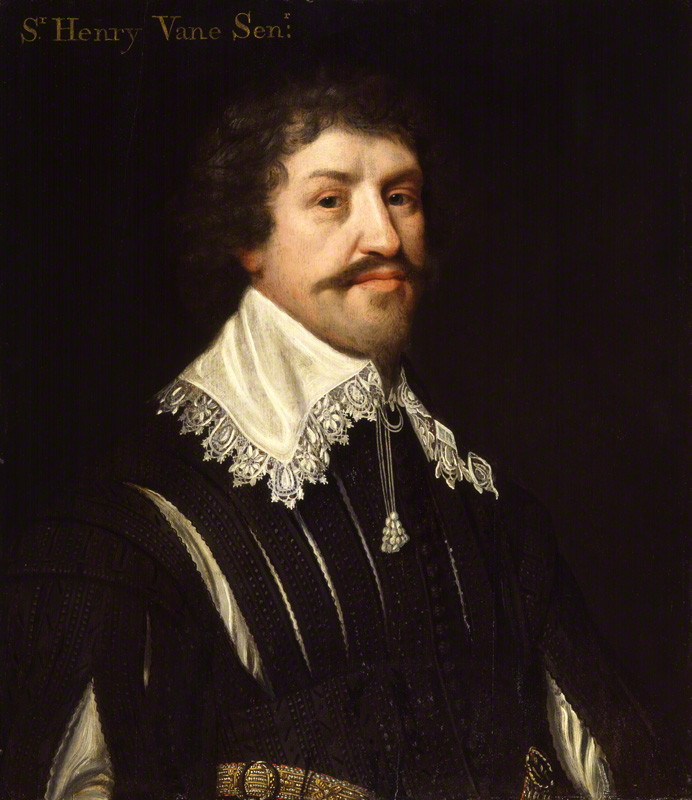
Sir Henry Vane – Wilton

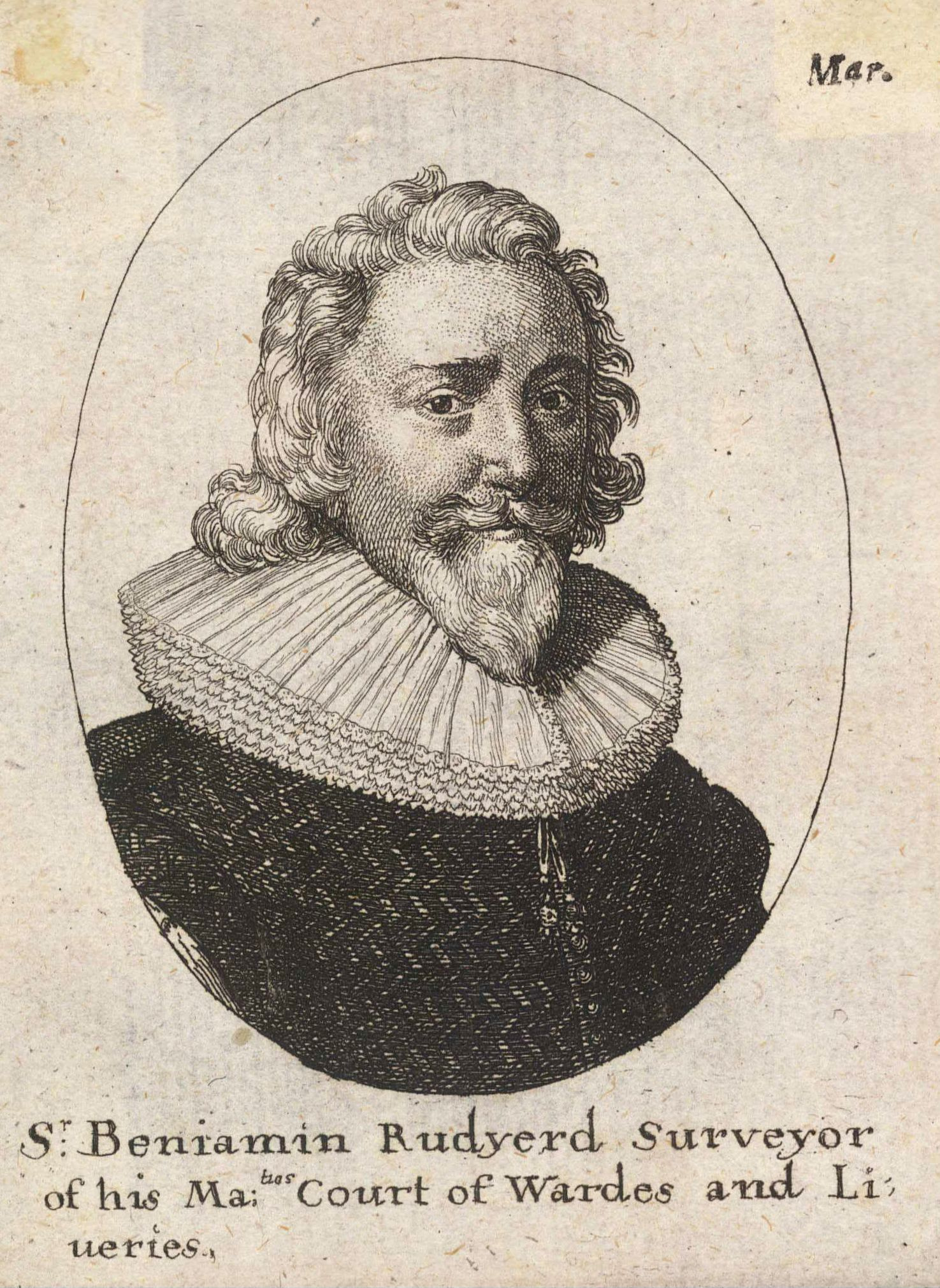
Benjamin Rudyerd – Wilton

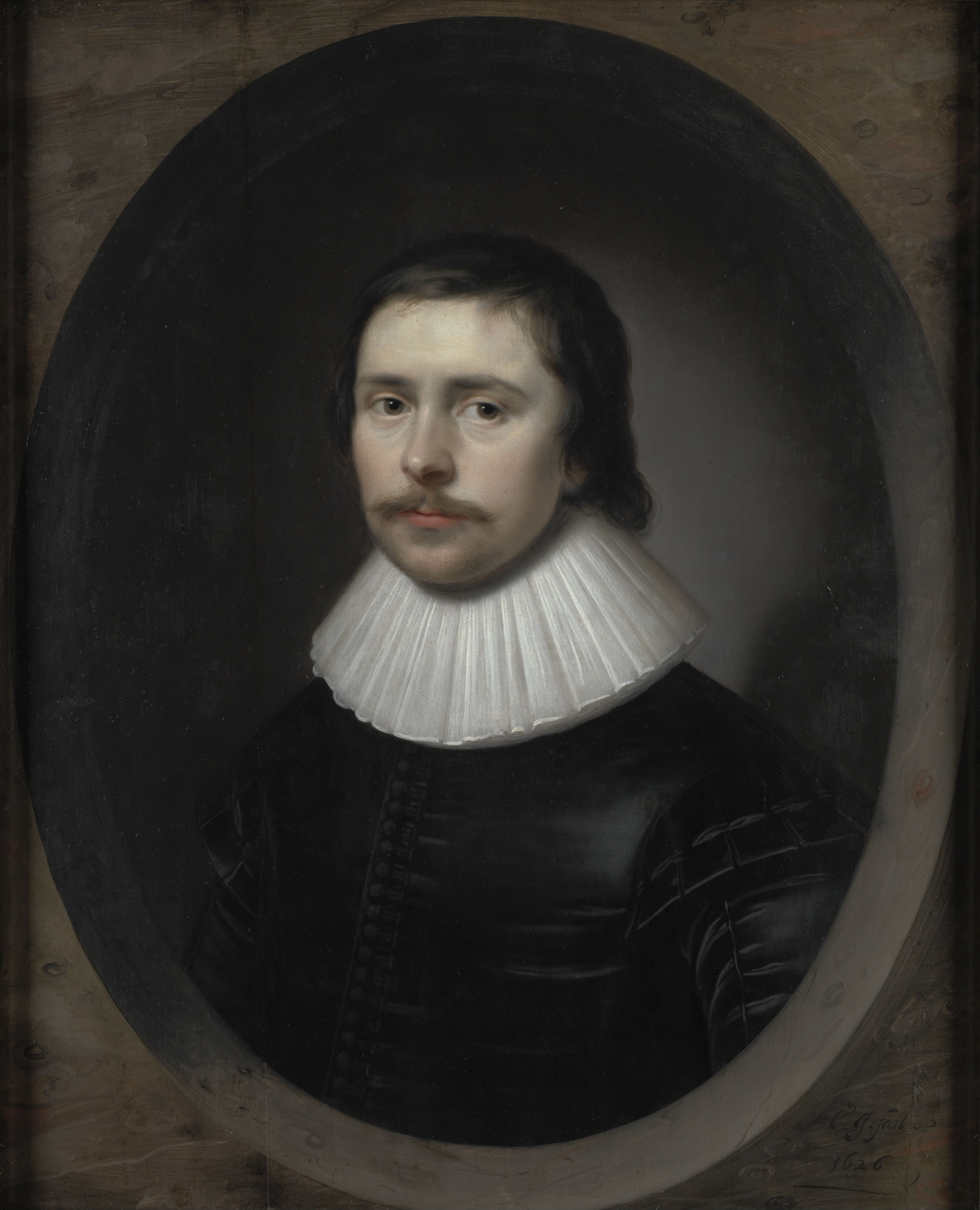
Edward Hyde – Wootton Bassett

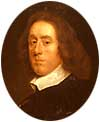
Henry Vane – Hull

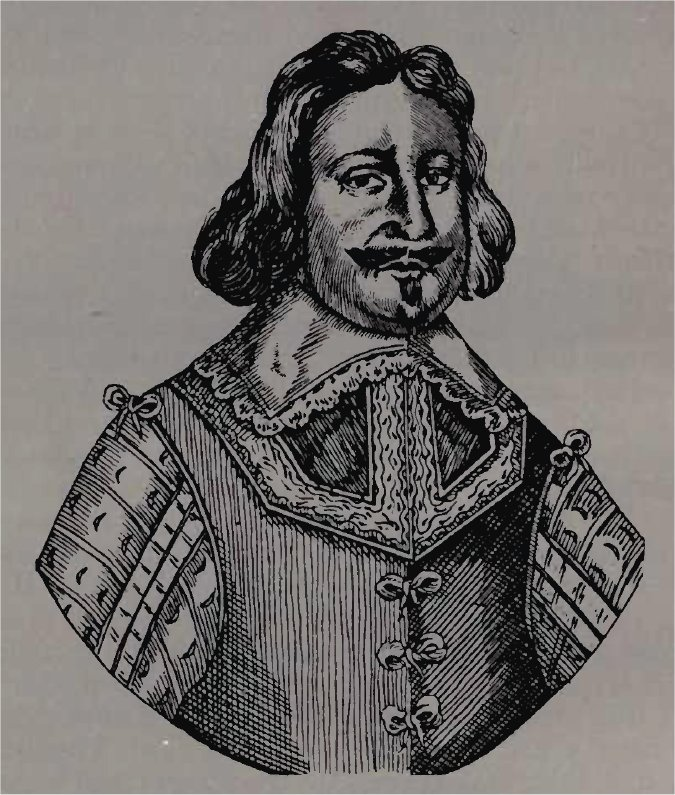
Ferdinando Lord Fairfax – Boroughbridge

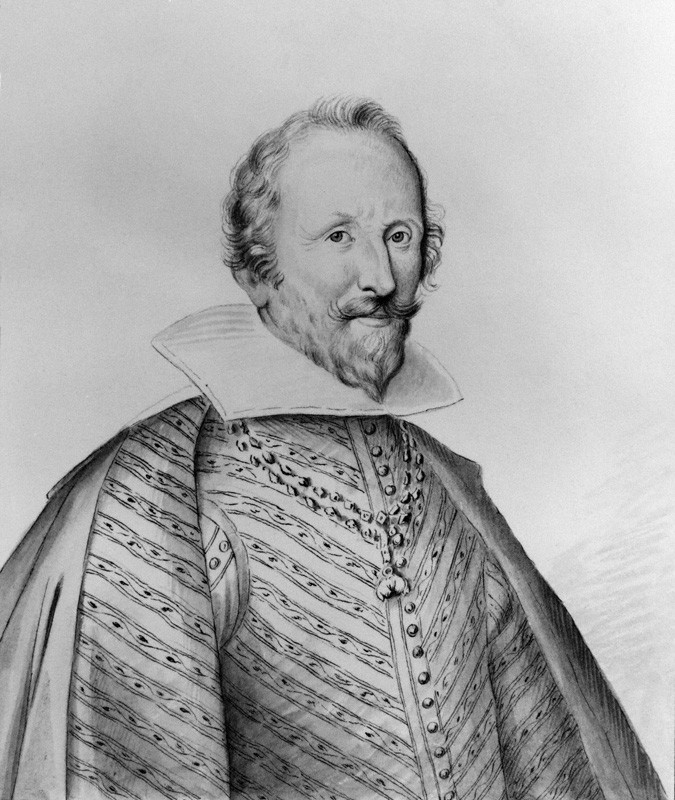
Sir John Colepeper – Rye

=== Bedfordshire ===
Constituency	Members	Notes
Bedfordshire	The Lord Wentworth; Sir Oliver Luke	
Bedford	Sir Beauchamp St John; Samuel Luke	Double return – William Boteler taken off
=== Berkshire ===
Constituency	Members	Notes
Berkshire	John Fettiplace; Henry Marten	
Windsor	Sir Arthur Ingram; Sir Richard Harrison	
Reading	Edward Herbert; Sir John Berkeley	Herbert chosen for Old Sarum and Berkeley chosen for Heytesbury; Replaced by Sir Francis Knollys sen. and Sir Francis Knollys jun
Wallingford	Edmund Dunch; Unton Croke	
Abingdon	Sir George Stonhouse Bt	
=== Buckinghamshire ===
Constituency	Members	Notes
Buckinghamshire	John Hampden; Arthur Goodwin	
Buckingham	Sir Peter Temple; Sir Alexander Denton	
Wycombe	Sir Edmund Verney; Thomas Lane	
Aylesbury	Sir John Pakington, Bt; Ralph Verney	
Amersham	William Drake; Edmund Waller	
Wendover	Robert Croke; Sir Walter Pye	Pye chosen for Herefordshire – replaced by Benet Hoskins
Marlow	John Borlase; Sir William Hicks	
=== Cambridgeshire ===
Constituency	Members	Notes
Cambridgeshire	Sir Dudley North; Sir John Cutts	
Cambridge University	Thomas Eden; Henry Lucas	
Cambridge	Oliver Cromwell; Thomas Meautys	
=== Cheshire ===
Constituency	Members	Notes
Cheshire	Sir William Brereton, Bt; Thomas Aston	
City of Chester	Sir Thomas Smith; Robert Brerewood	
=== Cornwall ===
Constituency	Members	Notes
Cornwall	William Godolphin; Richard Buller	
Launceston	Bevil Grenville; Ambrose Manaton	
Liskeard	John Harris; George Kekewich	
Lostwithiel	Nicholas Kendall; Richard Arundell	Browne Willis gives Nicholas Arundell instead of Richard and places him first.
Truro	John Rolle; Francis Rous	
Bodmin	Richard Prideaux; Sir Richard Wynn Bt	
Helston	William Godolphin; Sidney Godolphin	
Saltash	George Buller (MP); Francis Buller	
Camelford	Piers Edgecumbe; Edward Reade	
Grampound	John Trevanion; William Coryton; Warwick Mohun	
Eastlow	William Scawen; William Code	
Westlow	Anthony Mildmay; George Potter	
Penryn	Joseph Hall; Richard Vyvyan	
Tregoney	John St Aubyn; Sir John Arundell	
Bossiney	Edward Herle; Anthony Nichols	
St Ives	William Dell; Sir Henry Marten	
Fowey	Jonathan Rashleigh; Edwin Rich	
St Germans	William Scawen; John Eliot	
Mitchel	Peter Courtney; William Chadwell	Double return unresolved before the dissolution. Francis Basset and Samuel Cosworth also named, though Cosworth's name was later taken off.
Newport	Nicholas Trefusis; John Maynard	Maynard chosen for Totnes – replaced by Paul Speccot
St Mawes	Dr George Parry; James Lord Sheffield	
Callington	Sir Samuel Rolle; Thomas Gardiner	
=== Cumberland ===
Constituency	Members	Notes
Cumberland	Sir George Dalston; Sir Patricius Curwen	
Carlisle	Sir William Dalston Bt; Richard Barwis	
=== Derbyshire ===
Constituency	Members	Notes
Derbyshire	Sir John Curzon Bt; John Manners	
Derby	William Allestry; Nathaniel Hallowes	
=== Devon ===
Constituency	Members	Notes
Devon	Edward Seymour; Thomas Wise	
Exeter	Robert Walker; Jacob Tucker	Tucker replaced by Simon Snow
Totnes	Oliver St John; John Maynard	
Plymouth	Robert Trelawney; John Waddon	
Barnstaple	George Peard; Thomas Matthew	
Plympton Erle	Sir Richard Strode; Sir Nicholas Slanning; Thomas Hele Bt	
Tavistock	William Lord Russell; John Pym	
Clifton Dartmouth Hardness	John Upton; Andrew Voysey	
Bere Alston	John Harris; William Strode	
Tiverton	Peter Ball; Peter Sainthill	
=== Dorset ===
Constituency	Members	Notes
Dorset	Richard Rogers; George Lord Digby	
Poole	John Pyne; William Constantine	
Dorchester	Denzil Holles; Denis Bond	
Lyme Regis	Sir Walter Erle; Edmund Prideaux; Richard Rose	
Weymouth	Sir John Strangways; Thomas Gyard	
Melcombe	Giles Strangways; Richard King	
Bridport	Thomas Trenchard; Sir John Meller	
Shaftesbury	William Whitaker; Edward Hyde	Hyde chose Wootton Basset – replaced by Samuel Turner
Wareham	John Trenchard; Gilbert Jones	
Corfe Castle	Henry Jermyn; Thomas Jermyn	
=== Essex ===
Constituency	Members	Notes
Essex	Sir Thomas Barrington Bt; Harbottle Grimston (senior) .	
Colchester	Sir William Masham Bt; Harbottle Grimston (junior) .	
Maldon	Sir Henry Mildmay; John Porter	
Harwich	Sir Thomas Cheek; Sir John Jacob	
=== Gloucestershire ===
Constituency	Members	Notes
Gloucestershire	Sir Robert Tracy; Sir Robert Cooke	
Gloucester	William Singleton; Henry Brett	
Cirencester	Henry Poole; John George	
Tewkesbury	Sir Anthony Ashley Cooper; Sir Edward Alford	
=== Hampshire ===
Constituency	Members	Notes
Hampshire	Sir Henry Wallop; Richard Whitehead	
Winchester	John Lisle; Sir William Ogle	
Southampton	Sir John Mill, 1st Baronet; Thomas Levington	Browne Willis gives Sir Thomas Mill.
Portsmouth	William Hamilton; Hon. Henry Percy	
Petersfield	Sir William Lewis; William Uvedale	
Yarmouth	William Oglander; John Bulkeley	
Newport	Lucius Viscount Falkland; Henry Worsley	
Stockbridge	William Heveningham; William Jephson	
Newtown	Nicholas Weston; Sir John Meux, 1st Baronet	
Lymington	John Doddington; John Kempe	
Christchurch	Arnold Herbert; Henry Tulse	
Whitchurch	Sir Thomas Jervoise; Richard Jervoise	
Andover	Robert Wallop; Sir Richard Wynn, 2nd Baronet	
=== Herefordshire ===
Constituency	Members	Notes
Herefordshire	Sir Robert Harley; Sir Walter Pye	
Hereford	Richard Weaver; Richard Seaborne	
Weobley	William Tomkins; Thomas Tomkins	
Leominster	William Smallman; Walter Kyrle	
=== Hertfordshire ===
Constituency	Members	Notes
Hertfordshire	Sir William Lytton; Arthur Capel	
St Albans	Sir John Jennings; Richard Coningsby	
Hertford	Viscount Cranborne; Sir Thomas Fanshawe	
=== Huntingdonshire ===
Constituency	Members	Notes
Huntingdonshire	Thomas Cotton; Sir Capel Bedel	
Huntingdon	Robert Bernard; William Montagu	
=== Kent ===
Constituency	Members	Notes
Kent	Sir Roger Twysden; Norton Knatchbull	
Canterbury	Edward Masters; John Nutt	
Rochester	Sir Thomas Walsingham; John Clerke	
Maidstone	Sir George Fane; Francis Barnham	
Queenborough	Sir Edward Hales; John Wolstenholme	
=== Lancashire ===
Constituency	Members	Notes
Lancashire	Sir Gilbert Hoghton, 2nd Baronet; William Farrington	
Preston	Richard Shuttleworth; Thomas Standish	
Lancaster	Roger Kirkby; John Harrison	
Newton	Sir Richard Wynn, 2nd Baronet; William Sherman	Wynn sat for Andover
Wigan	Orlando Bridgeman; Alexander Rigby	
Clitheroe	Sir Ralph Assheton; Richard Shuttleworth	
Liverpool	James Lord Cranfield; John Holcroft	
=== Leicestershire ===
Leicestershire	Sir Arthur Hesilrige; Hon. Lord Grey of Ruthyn.	
Leicester	Simon Every; Thomas Coke	
=== Lincolnshire ===
Constituency	Members	Notes
Lincolnshire	Sir John Wray; Sir Edward Hussey	
Lincoln	John Farmery; Thomas Grantham	
Boston	Sir Anthony Irby; William Ellis	
Grimsby	Christopher Wray; Sir Gervase Holles	
Stamford	Thomas Hatton; Thomas Hatcher	
Grantham	Sir Edward Bashe; Henry Pelham	
=== Middlesex ===
Constituency	Members	Notes
Middlesex	Sir Gilbert Gerard, Bt; Sir John Franklyn	
Westminster	Sir John Glynne; William Bell	
City of London	Thomas Soame; Isaac Penington; Matthew Cradock; Samuel Vassall	Browne Willis gives John for Thomas Soame, but other sources indicate Thomas.
=== Monmouthshire ===
Constituency	Members	Notes
Monmouthshire	William Morgan; Walter Rumsey	
Monmouth Boroughs	Charles Jones	Jones was also elected for Beaumaris, but had not chosen his seat before parliament was dissolved
=== Norfolk ===
Constituency	Members	Notes
Norfolk	Sir John Holland, Bt; Sir Edmund Moundeford	
Norwich	Thomas Atkins; Thomas Tooley	
King's Lynn	William Doughty; Thomas Gurling (Alderman).	
Yarmouth	Miles Corbet; Edward Owner	
Thetford	Sir Thomas Wodehouse; Framlingham Gawdy	
Castle Rising	Thomas Talbot; Nicholas Harman	
=== Northamptonshire ===
Constituency	Members	Notes
Northamptonshire	John Crew; Sir Gilbert Pickering, Bt	
Peterborough	David Cecil; William FitzWilliam, 2nd Baron FitzWilliam	
Northampton	Zouch Tate; Richard Knightley	
Brackley	Sir Thomas Wenman; Sir Martin Lister	
Higham Ferrers	Sir Christopher Hatton	
=== Northumberland ===
Constituency	Members	Notes
Northumberland	Sir John Fenwick; Sir William Widdrington	
Newcastle	Sir Peter Riddel; Thomas Liddell	
Morpeth	Sir Philip Mainwaring; Thomas Witherings	
Berwick upon Tweed	Sir Thomas Widdrington; Hugh Potter	
=== Nottinghamshire ===
Constituency	Members	Notes
Nottinghamshire	Sir Thomas Hutchinson; Robert Sutton	
Nottingham	Sir Charles Cavendish; Gilbert Boone	
East Retford	Sir Gervase Clifton; Francis Pierrepont	
=== Oxfordshire ===
Constituency	Members	Notes
Oxfordshire	Hon. James Fiennes; Sir Francis Wenman	
Oxford University	Sir Francis Windebanke; John Danvers	
Oxford	Charles Lord Howard Viscount Andover; Thomas Cooper	
Woodstock	William Lenthall; William Fleetwood	
Banbury	Nathaniel Fiennes	
=== Rutland ===
Constituency	Members	Notes
Rutland	Hon. Baptist Noel; Sir Guy Palmes	
=== Salop ===
Constituency	Members	Notes
Shropshire	William Pierrepont; Sir Vincent Corbet, 1st Baronet	
Shrewsbury	Francis Newport; Thomas Owen	
Bridgnorth	(Sir) Thomas Whitmore; Edward Acton	
Ludlow	Charles Baldwin; Ralph Goodwin	
Wenlock	Sir Thomas Littleton, Bt; Richard Cresset	
Bishops Castle	Robert Howard; Richard Moor	
=== Somerset ===
Constituency	Members	Notes
Somerset	Sir Ralph Hopton; Thomas Smith	
Bristol	John Glanville; Humphrey Hooke	
Bath	Sir Charles Berkley; Alexander Popham	
Wells	Sir Edward Rodney; John Baber	
Taunton	Sir William Portman; Roger Hill	
Bridgwater	Edmund Wyndham; Robert Blake	
Minehead	Francis Wyndham; Alexander Popham	Popham chosen for Bath – replaced by Dr Arthur Duck
Ilchester	Sir Henry Berkeley; Edward Phelips	
Milborne Port	Edward Kyrton; Thomas Earl	
=== Staffordshire ===
Constituency	Members	Notes
Staffordshire	Sir Edward Littleton; Sir William Bowyer	
Lichfield	Sir Walter Devereux; Sir Richard Dyott	
Stafford	Ralph Sneyd; Richard Weston	
Newcastle under Lyme	Sir John Merrick; Richard Lloyd	
Tamworth	George Abbot; Sir Simon Archer	
=== Suffolk ===
Constituency	Members	Notes
Suffolk	Sir Nathaniel Barnardiston; Sir Philip Parker	
Ipswich	John Gurdon; William Cage	
Dunwich	Henry Coke; Anthony Bedingfield	
Orford	Sir Charles le Grosse; Sir Edward Duke	
Eye	Sir Frederick Cornwallis; Sir Roger North	
Aldeburgh	William Rainsborough; Squire Bence	
Sudbury	Sir Robert Crane, 1st Baronet; Richard Pepys	
Bury St Edmunds	Sir Thomas Jermyn; John Godbolt	
=== Surrey ===
Constituency	Members	Notes
Surrey	Sir Richard Onslow; Sir Ambrose Browne	
Southwark	Robert Holborne; Richard Tuffnell	
Bletchingley	Edward Bysshe; Edmund Hoskins	
Reigate	Edward Thurland; Sir Thomas Bludder	Browne Willis gives Thomas Thurland, as does Nalson.
Guildford	Sir Robert Parkhurst; George Abbotts	
Gatton	Sir Samuel Owfield; Edward Sanders	
Haslemere	Sir John Jacques; William Eliot	
=== Sussex ===
Constituency	Members	Notes
Sussex	Sir Thomas Pelham Bt; Anthony Stapley	
Chichester	Christopher Lewknor; Edward Dowse	
Horsham	Thomas Middleton; Hall Ravenscroft .	
Midhurst	Thomas May; Robert Long	
Lewes	Anthony Stapley; James Rivers	Stapley elected to sit for Sussex and was replaced by Herbert Morley.
New Shoreham	John Alford; William Marlott	
Bramber	Sir Edward Bishopp; Sir Thomas Bowyer	
Steyning	Sir John Leedes; Sir Thomas Farnefold	
East Grinstead	Sir Henry Compton; Robert Goodwin	
Arundel	Henry Garton; Henry Goring	
=== Warwickshire ===
Constituency	Members	Notes
Warwickshire	Sir Thomas Lucy; William Combe	
Coventry	William Jesson; Simon Norton	
Warwick	William Purefoy; Godfrey Bosvile	
=== Westmorland ===
Constituency	Members	Notes
Westmoreland	Sir Philip Musgrave; Sir Henry Bellingham	
Appleby	Richard Viscount Dungarvon; Richard Lowther	
=== Wiltshire ===
Constituency	Members	Notes
Wiltshire	Philip Lord Herbert; Sir Francis Seymour	
Salisbury	Robert Hyde; Michael Oldisworth	
Wilton	Sir Henry Vane (the elder); Sir Benjamin Rudyerd	
Downton	Sir Edward Griffin; William Eyre	
Hindon	Sir Miles Fleetwood; George Garrett	
Heytesbury	Sir John Berkeley; Thomas Moore	
Westbury	Sir Thomas Penyston, 1st Baronet; John Ashe	
Calne	William Maynard; Walter Norborne	
Devizes	Edward Bayntun; Henry Danvers	Browne Willis gives William for Edward.
Chippenham	Sir Edward Baynton; Edward Hungerford	Browne Willis gives William for Edward Bayntun.
Malmesbury	Sir Neville Poole; Sir Anthony Hungerford	
Cricklade	Robert Jenner; Thomas Hodges	
Great Bedwyn	Richard Hardinge; Charles Seymour	
Ludgershall	William Ashburnham; Sir John Evelyn	
Old Sarum	Edward Herbert; Sir William Howard	
Wootton Bassett	Thomas Windebanke; Edward Hyde	
Marlborough	Sir William Carnaby; Francis Baskerville	
=== Worcestershire ===
Constituency	Members	Notes
Worcestershire	Sir Thomas Lyttelton; Sir John Pakington	
Worcester	John Coucher; John Nash	
Droitwich	John Wilde; Samuel Sandys	
Evesham	William Sandys; William Morton	
Bewdley	Sir Henry Herbert	
=== Yorkshire ===
Constituency	Members	Notes
Yorkshire	Henry Belasyse; Sir William Savile, 3rd Baronet	
York	Sir Edward Osborne, 1st Baronet; Sir Roger Jaques	
Kingston upon Hull	Sir John Lister; Sir Henry Vane, junior	
Knaresborough	Sir Henry Slingsby; Henry Benson	
Scarborough	Sir Hugh Cholmeley; John Hotham	
Ripon	William Mallory; Sir Paul Neille	
Richmond	Sir William Pennyman, 1st Baronet; Maulger Norton	
Hedon	Sir Philip Stapleton; John Alured	
Boroughbridge	Ferdinando, Lord Fairfax; Francis Neville	
Thirsk	John Belasyse; William Frankland	
Aldborough	Richard Aldborough; Brian Palmes	
Beverley	Sir John Hotham Bt; Michael Warton	
Pontefract	Sir John Ramsden; Sir George Wentworth of Woolley	
=== Cinque Ports ===
Constituency	Members	Notes
Hastings	Sir John Baker; Robert Reed	
Romney	Thomas Godfrey; William Steele	
Hythe	Henry Heyman; John Wandesford	
Dover	Sir Edward Boys; Sir Peter Heyman	
Sandwich	Sir John Manwood; Nathaniel Finch	
Rye	Sir John Colepepper; John White	
Winchelsea	Nicholas Crisp; John Finch	
=== Wales ===
Constituency	Members	Notes
Anglesey	John Bodvel	
Beaumaris	Charles Jones	
Brecknockshire	William Morgan	
Brecknock	Herbert Price	
Cardiganshire	James Lewis	
Cardigan	John Vaughan	
Carmarthenshire	Henry Vaughan	
Carmarthen	Francis Lloyd	
Carnarvonshire	Thomas Glynn	
Carnarvon	John Glynn	
Denbighshire	Sir Thomas Salusbury, 2nd Baronet	
Denbigh Boroughs	John Salusbury	
Flintshire	John Mostyn	
Flint	Sir Thomas Hanmer, 2nd Baronet	Browne Willis gives Sir John Hanmer.
Glamorgan	Sir Edward Stradling	
Cardiff	William Herbert	
Merioneth	Henry Wynn	
Montgomeryshire	Richard Herbert	
Montgomery	Sir Edward Lloyd	Browne Willis gives Henry.
Pembrokeshire	John Wogan	
Pembroke	Sir John Stepney, 3rd Baronet	
Haverford West	Hugh Owen	
Radnorshire	Charles Price	
Radnor	Richard Jones	

== See also ==
- List of parliaments of the United Kingdom
- Short Parliament
