= Sir Thomas Bishopp, 1st Baronet =

English politician

Sir Thomas Bishopp, 1st Baronet (1553–1626), also spelt Bishop and Bisshopp, was an English politician.

He was the only son of Thomas Bishop of Henfield, Sussex and his wife, Elizabeth Belknap. On his father's death in 1560, he was aged 6 and the sole heir.

He inherited a substantial estate, including the rectory and park at Henfield, the manors of Beeding, Drayton, Hunston, Stubcroft, and certain farms and stock including a flock of 1,000 sheep. His wardship was acquired by Sir Richard Sackville and subsequently passed to his son Thomas Sackville, 1st Earl of Dorset. He has been tentatively identified as the Thomas Byshope admitted to St John's College, Cambridge in 1562. Although he would have been exceptionally young, the college was that attended by Thomas Sackville. In 1572 he was admitted to the Inner Temple from Clifford's Inn.

Thomas Bishopp's connection with the Sackville family explains his swift promotion to office in Sussex, where he became a Justice of the Peace in 1578. In the 1587 report on Sussex justices of the peace Bishopp was a "young man" who was a "good justice". In 1584 he was returned to parliament for Gatton, the seat formerly represented by his father. He was appointed Sheriff of Surrey and Sussex for 1584–85.This may have resulted in his withdrawal from the House of Commons, as sheriffs were required to obtain permission to leave their counties during their term. He returned to parliament in 1586, sitting for Steyning. He was again appointed Sheriff of Surrey and Sussex for 1601–02 and sat again for Steyning in 1604.

He bought the Parham House estate, Sussex in 1601 and was invested by King James I as a knight on 7 May 1603 at Theobalds House. He was made baronet Bishopp of Parham in the County of Sussex in 1620.

== Family ==
He married

1. Anne Cromer, only daughter of William Cromer by his first wife Margaret, daughter of Thomas Kempe of Wye, Kent, on 19 September 1577.
2. Jane Weston (d. 1637), daughter of Sir Richard Weston

Sir Edward Bishopp, 2nd Baronet
Henry Bishopp, was a Postmaster General of England and inventor of the first postmark used on mail.

Parliament of England
Preceded by Edmund Tylney; Roland Maylard	Member of Parliament for Gatton; 1584–1585; With: Edward Browne	Succeeded by John Puckering; Edward Browne
Preceded by Thomas Shirley; Pexall Brocas	Member of Parliament for Steyning; 1586–1587; With: Henry Shelley	Succeeded by Thomas Crompton; Henry Apsley
Preceded by Sir Thomas Shirley; Robert Bowyer	Member of Parliament for Steyning; 1604–1611; With: Sir Thomas Shirley	Succeeded by Sir Thomas Shirley; Edward Fraunceys
Baronetage of England
New title	Baronet of Parham; 1620–1626	Succeeded by Edward Bishopp
