= Thomas Leedes =

Thomas Leedes (died 1645) was an English politician who sat in the House of Commons from 1640 to 1642. He supported the Royalist cause in the English Civil War and was killed in action fighting for the King.

Leedes was the son of Sir John Leedes and his wife who was a daughter of Sir Thomas Monson of Burton Lincolnshire. In April 1640, he was elected Member of Parliament for Steyning in the Short Parliament. He was re-elected MP for Steyning in the Long Parliament in November 1640. He was disabled from sitting in parliament on 23 November 1642 together with Sir Thomas Bowyer, 1st Baronet for assisting in putting a garrison into Chichester for the King. He was killed in the service of the King at Oxford in 1645.

Leedes married Anne Browne, daughter of Sir Ambrose Browne, 1st Baronet of Betchworth Castle, Sussex.

Parliament of England
Preceded by Sir John Leedes; Sir Thomas Farnefold	Member of Parliament for Steyning; 1640–1642	Succeeded by Edward Apsley; Herbert Board
