= Thomas Shirley =

English soldier, adventurer and politician

Sir Thomas Shirley (c. 1564 – c. 1634) was an English soldier, adventurer and politician who sat in the House of Commons at various times between 1584 and 1622. His financial difficulties drove him into privateering which culminated in his capture by the Turks and later imprisonment in the Tower of London.

== Family ==
Thomas Shirley was the eldest son of Sir Thomas Shirley of Wiston House, Sussex, and Anne Kempe, the daughter of Sir Thomas Kempe (d. 7 March 1591) of Olantigh in Wye, Kent. Sir Anthony Shirley and Sir Robert Shirley were his younger brothers.

== Career ==
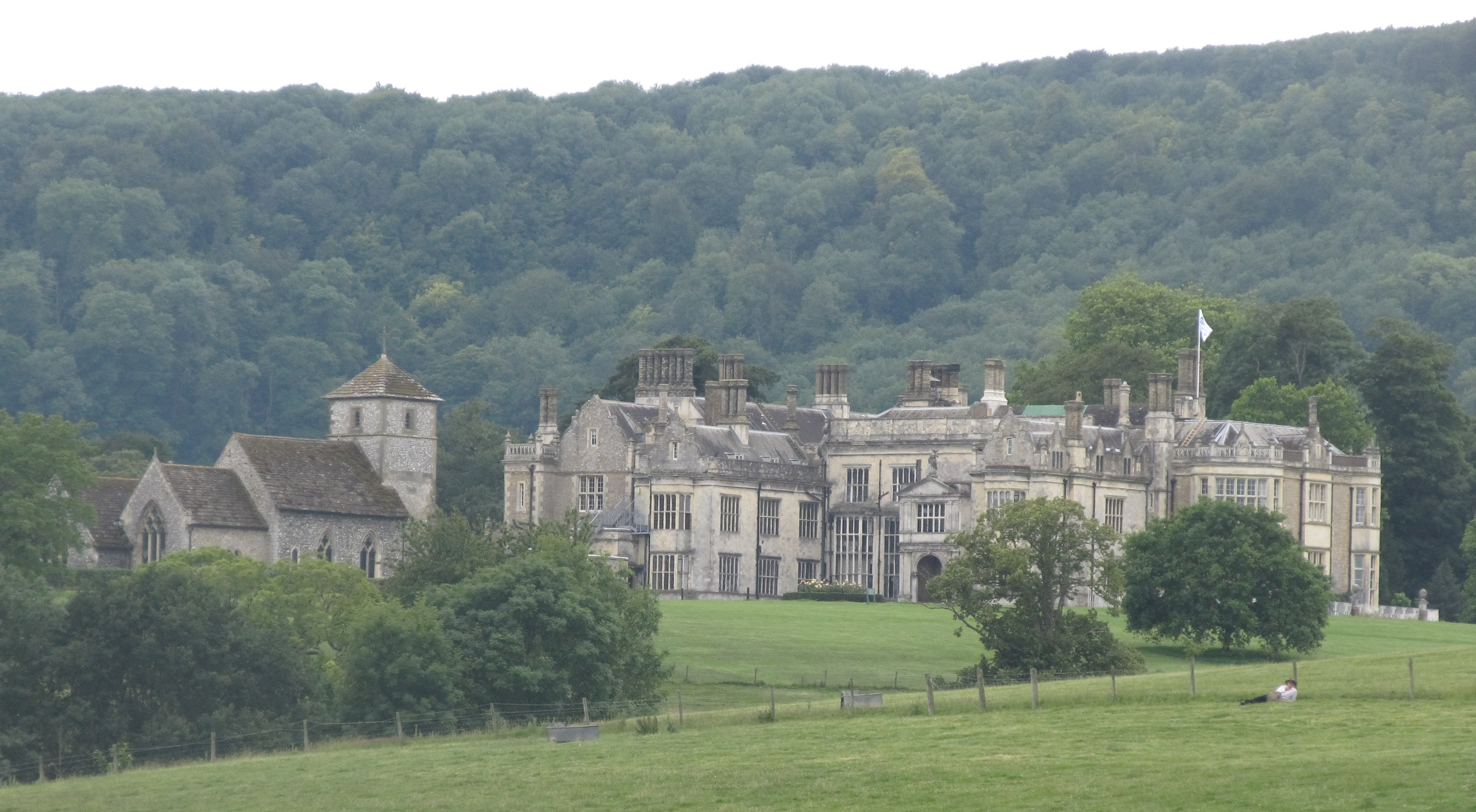
Wiston House today

Shirley matriculated at Hart Hall, Oxford in 1579, but left the university without taking a degree. In 1584 he was elected Member of Parliament for Steyning. He went on military service with his father and brother in the Low Countries in 1585, and later saw some in Ireland. He was knighted at Kilkenny in Ireland by Lord Deputy William Fitz-William on 26 October 1589. Shirley later came to the court. In the summer of 1591, he was married secretly to one of Queen Elizabeth's maids of honour, and when the queen heard of it, she promptly committed him to the prison at Marshalsea. He remained in prison until the spring of 1592. In 1593, he was again elected MP for Steyning. In the same year, he saw service with the rank of captain in the Low Countries again.

Shirley was beginning to suffer from hopeless embarrassment because of his father's increasing financial difficulties. To secure a livelihood, he decided to undertake a privateering expedition to attack Spanish merchant ships. He handed over his company at Flushing, Cornwall to Thomas Vavasour, a relation of his wife, and in the summer of 1598 sailed into the English Channel, and seized four 'hulks' of Lübeck which were reputed to be carrying Spanish goods. He may have made some of his attacks with the Queen's ship Foresight, which he commanded in 1599. The costs and returns were high. A ship Shirley captured while returning from San Domingo, laden with sugar, was valued at £4700. In April 1600, Shirley offered the Earl of Nottingham £600 for his tenth share in two ships he brought into Plymouth in Devon and said he had already paid £2000 for 'the company's thirds'. In October 1600, Shirley was brought before the admiralty court for seizing a ship from Hamburg that contained cargo belonging to Dutch merchants, and Henry Brooke, 11th Baron Cobham had to intervene on his behalf. He also came under attack from his creditors as some supporters of Richard Weston broke into his father's house at Blackfriars, London in July 1600 and threatened the Shirleys, father and son, demanding payment. In 1601 his father required the borough seat of Steyning. Shirley was elected both as Member of Parliament for Bramber and Hastings, and chose to sit for Hastings. In 1602 he renewed his privateering adventures, and pillaged 'two poor hamlets of two dozen houses in Portugal.'

At the end of 1602, Shirley equipped two ships for a more ambitious adventure in the Levant, where he aimed to strike a blow against the Ottoman Empire of Mehmed III. He was encouraged by the Ferdinando I de' Medici, Grand Duke of Tuscany at Florence, who supported Rudolf II, Holy Roman Emperor in this respect. However, he made an imprudent descent on the island of Kea on 15 Jan 1603 and was captured by the Turks. He was transferred to Negropont on 20 March, and on 25 July 1603, he was brought as a close prisoner to Istanbul. When news of his misfortunes reached England, James I appealed to the Ottoman government to secure his release. The English ambassador to the Sublime Porte, Henry Lello, made every effort on his behalf, and he was finally released on 6 December 1605, after 1100 dollars had been paid to his jailers. He immediately went to Spanish Naples, where Toby Mathew described him on August 8, 1606 as living there 'like a gallant.' At the end of 1606, he returned to England.

Shirley was imprisoned in the Tower of London in September 1607 on a charge of illegal interference with the operations of the Levant Company. It was said that he had "overbusied himself with the traffic of Constantinople, to have brought it to Venice and to the Florentine territories." In August 1611, he was confined in the king's bench as an insolvent debtor. The death of his father next year and his second marriage greatly increased his difficulties. Wiston, which had fallen into ruins, was sold, but he was elected MP for Steyning in 1614 and 1621.

Shirley is said to have retired subsequently to the Isle of Wight, and to have died there about 1630.

== Marriages and issue ==
Shirley married firstly Frances Vavasour, daughter of Henry Vavasour of Copmanthorpe, by whom he had three sons and four daughters. His second son, Henry Shirley, was the dramatist who was murdered in London on 31 October 1627. His only surviving son by his first marriage, Thomas Shirley, was baptised at West Clandon, Surrey, on 30 June 1597, was knighted in 1645 by Charles I at Oxford, was alive in 1664, and was father of Thomas Sherley [q. v.], the physician.

Shirley married secondly at Deptford on 2 December 1617, a widow, Judith Taylor, daughter of William Bennet of London, by whom he had five sons and six daughters.

== See also ==
- García de Silva Figueroa

== Notes ==
Parliament of England
Preceded by John Cowper; Richard Pellatt	Member of Parliament for Steyning; 1584; With: Pexall Brocas	Succeeded by Thomas Bishop; Henry Shelley
Preceded by Thomas Crompton; Henry Apsley	Member of Parliament for Steyning; 1593; With: Sir Walter Waller	Succeeded by John Shurley; Thomas Shirley III
Preceded by Nicholas Trott; William Comber	Member of Parliament for Bramber; 1601; With: Henry Bowyer	Succeeded by Henry Lok; Henry Bowyer
Preceded by Richard Lyffe; Edmund Pelham	Member of Parliament for Hastings; 1601; With: Richard Lyffe	Succeeded by Richard Lyffe; Sir George Carew
Preceded by Sir Thomas Bishopp; Sir Thomas Shirley	Member of Parliament for Steyning; 1614–1622; With: Edward Fraunceys	Succeeded by Sir Thomas Farnfold; Edward Fraunceys
