= Thomas Farnefold =

English politician

Thomas Farnfold (c. 1600 – 19 March 1643) was an English politician who sat in the House of Commons variously between 1624 and 1643. The subject became a ward at age twelve and his wardship passed to the young Sir Edward Sackville before Bartholomew Rogers, the usher of the court of wards, took wardship of the subject and married him to his daughter.

In 1623 Farnfold was elected Member of Parliament for Steyning, and was re-elected in 1625. His occupations were county official, justice of the peace, and Gentleman-pensioner. He was confined to prison in 1622 for his quarrel with William Knollys, 1st Earl of Banbury and confined to the Fleet Prison in 1638 for two weeks. He was re-elected in 1628 and held the seat until 1629 when King Charles decided to rule without parliament for eleven years. In April 1640, he was re-elected MP for Steyning in the Short Parliament and again in November 1640 for the Long Parliament.

Farnfold owned property in Sussex including Churchmeadow, Gatwickes, a water mill and lands and Wickham Farm Steyning

Farnhold died in 1643.

Parliament of England
Preceded by Thomas Shirley; Sir Edward Fraunceys	Member of Parliament for Steyning; 1624–1625; With: Sir Edward Fraunceys	Succeeded by Sir Edward Fraunceys; Sir Edward Bishopp, 2nd Baronet
Preceded by Sir Edward Fraunceys; Sir Edward Bishopp, 2nd Baronet	Member of Parliament for Steyning; 1628–1629; With: Sir Edward Alford	Parliament suspended until 1640
Parliament suspended since 1629	Member of Parliament for Steyning; 1640–1643; With: Sir John Leedes 1640; Thomas Leedes 1640–1642	Succeeded by Edward Apsley; Herbert Board
