= Bernard Brocas =

Bernard Brocas may refer to:

- Bernard Brocas (soldier and MP) (1330–1395), army commander and MP
- Bernard Brocas (rebel) (c. 1354–1400), English rebel executed for treason
- Bernard Brocas (16th-century MP), MP for Buckingham in 1558
