= Edward Alford =

Edward Alford may refer to:

- Edward Alford (Colchester MP) (c. 1566–c. 1632), English landowner and politician
- Edward Alford (Royalist) (c. 1595–1653), MP for Tewkesbury
