= Henry Shirley =

Henry Shirley may refer to:

- Henry Shirley (dramatist) (died 1627), English dramatist, murdered by Sir Edward Bishopp, 2nd Baronet
- Henry Shirley, 3rd Earl Ferrers (1691–1745), English nobleman and lunatic
- Henry Shirley (diplomat) on List of ambassadors of the United Kingdom to Russia
- Arthur Shirley (Henry Raymond Shirley, 1886–1967), Australian actor, writer, producer and director
- Henry G. Shirley (1874–1941), commissioner of the Virginia Department of Highways
- Sir Henry Shirley, 2nd Baronet (1589–1633), landowner and local politician
