= Thomas Bishop (MP) =

16th-century English politician

Thomas Bishop (by 1506–1560) was an English politician who was a Member of the Parliament (MP) for Gatton in 1542.

Nothing is known of Bishop before 1527, by which time he was a clerk to Sir William Shelley, recorder of London. Admitted to the Inner Temple, by 1528 he was prothonotary to the sheriff's court in London. In 1533 he was granted the lease of the rectory of Henfield, Sussex by Robert Sherborne, bishop of Chichester for whom he acted as lawyer. He was elected to parliament in 1542 for Gatton, Surrey through the patronage of Sir William's daughter Elizabeth, who had married Robert Copley of Gatton.

He married Elizabeth, illegitimate daughter and co-heiress of Sir Edward Belknap (d. 1521), Shelley's brother-in-law, and widow of Walter Scott (d. 1550) of Stapleford Tawney and Woolston, Essex. by whom she had issue. He was the father of Sir Thomas Bishopp, 1st Baronet.

There is a memorial to him in Henfield church.
