= Edward Alford (Royalist) =

English landowner and politician (c. 1595–1653)

Sir Edward Alford (c. 1595 – 1653) was an English landowner and politician who sat in the House of Commons at various times between 1628 and 1644. He supported the Royalist cause in the English Civil War.

== Early life ==
Alford was the son of Edward Alford and his wife Judith Downing, daughter of Edmund Downing of Suffolk. He matriculated at Christ Church, Oxford on 30 October 1612, aged 17. While his father was occupied with his Parliamentary and public duties in London and Essex, Alford appears to have lived at Offington, and was active in Sussex. He was High Sheriff of Surrey and Sussex in 1624 and was concerned with local militia. In 1627 "The King commissioned Edward Alford, with others, to use martial law to soldiers billeted in co. Sussex." and he made complaints against the freeman of Billinghurst, Sussex, for not duly maintaining a watch at a beacon."In 1628 he "renders some accounts of prize-ships." and is in correspondence with Sir John Coke regarding the billeting of soldiers near Portsmouth. In 1628 Edward Alford was elected Member of Parliament for Steyning. Sources differ as to whether this is Alford or his father, who was also elected for Colchester but was unseated on petition.

Alford was knighted by King Charles in 1632. His father died in the same year and the family estates of Hamsey and Offington passed to Alford's elder brother John Alford. Alford also had an interest in Somerset, being lord of the manor of Stanton Drew and his name is recorded at the Taunton Sessions in 1635 in a case of poaching on his manor.

== Parliamentary career and censure ==
In April 1640, Alford was elected Member of Parliament for Tewkesbury in the Short Parliament. He was re-elected MP for Tewkesbury and also elected MP for Arundel in November 1640 for the Long Parliament. There was a double return at Tewkesbury but by the time it was resolved Alford had chosen to sit for Arundel. Alford was on the King's side in the Civil War, and was disabled from sitting in parliament in 1644. He was involved in the capitulation of Exeter in 1649 and was severely fined by the Commonwealth. He had only just succeeded to the Offington estates, on the death of his brother, John Alford. The fine for Offington alone was £1,503. He was also fined £1,075 on lands and messuages in Tewkesbury worth £430 p.a, .£189 on the rectory of Cheltenham and Charlton worth £75 pa, £852 on the manor of Ilmington Warwickshire worth £333 p.a., £970 on lands at Whitbury Wiltshire, worth £194, £250 on King's Langley Park, Hertford and £500 on the manor of Pindast in the parish of Waltham Cross worth £200 p.a.

== Personal life ==
Alford married Lady Mary Cooper, widow of Sir John Cooper, 1st Baronet, her second husband, and of Sir Charles Morrison, 1st Baronet of Cashiobury, Hertfordshire, on 11 December 1632. She was the youngest daughter of Baptist Hicks, 1st Viscount Campden. She had no children by her marriage to Alford, and died seven years later, in 1639. She was buried "in the Isle of Watford parish church".

Alford's second marriage was to Ann Corbett, daughter of Dr. Corbett, Chancellor of Norwich. By this marriage he had two children, John and Frances. Alford died intestate in 1653 at the age of 61. Lady Alford outlived Sir Edward by nearly forty years and died in 1692. She was buried at St. Mary's Church, Broadwater, where there is a brass in the Chancel floor with the following inscription:

"Here lyeth the bodye of
Anne, wife of Sir Edward Alford, Knight;
Who departed this life
Feb: ye 4th, Ano. 1692,
Aged 74 yeares."

Parliament of England
Preceded by Sir Edward Bishopp; Edward Fraunceys	Member of Parliament for Steyning; 1628–1629; With: Sir Thomas Farnfold	Parliament suspended until 1640
Vacant Parliament suspended since 1629	Member of Parliament for Tewkesbury; 1640–1641; With: Sir Anthony Ashley Cooper 1640; Sir Robert Cooke 1640–1641	Succeeded by Sir Robert Cooke; Edward Stephens
Preceded by Henry Garton; Henry Goring	Member of Parliament for Arundel; 1640–1644; With: Henry Garton; John Downes	Succeeded by John Downes; Herbert Hay
