= Henry Garton =

English politician (1600–1641)

Henry Garton (1600 – 1641) was an English politician who sat in the House of Commons from 1640 to 1641.

Garton was the son of Sir Peter Garton of Woolavington, Sussex. He matriculated at Queen's College, Oxford on 27 October 1615, aged 15 and was awarded BA on 20 April 1618. He was called to the bar at Middle Temple in 1626.

In April 1640, Garton was elected member of parliament for Arundel in the Short Parliament. He was re-elected MP for Arunfel for the Long Parliament in November 1640 and sat until his death in 1641.

Garton died at the age of 41 and was buried in the middle aisle of Temple Church on 30 October 1641.

Parliament of England
Vacant Parliament suspended since 1629	Member of Parliament for Arundel; 1640; With: Henry Goring 1640; Edward Alford 1640–1641	Succeeded by Edward Alford; John Downes
