= Sir Edward Bishopp, 2nd Baronet =

English politician

Sir Edward Bishopp, 2nd Baronet (1602 – April 1649) was an English politician who sat in the House of Commons in 1626 and in 1640. He supported the Royalist cause in the English Civil War.

Bishopp was the son of Thomas Bishopp of Parham Park, Sussex, and his second wife Jane Weston, daughter of Richard Weston of Sutton Surrey. He was born 6 September 1602. He matriculated at Trinity College, Oxford on 22 October 1619, aged 18 and was a student of the Inner Temple in 1620. He was knighted at Hampton Court on 18 December 1625 and succeeded to the baronetcy on the death of his father in 1626. In 1626, he was elected Member of Parliament (MP) for Steyning.

In 1627 Bishopp killed Henry Shirley when Shirley attempted to collect a £40 annual annuity that Bishopp owed him under the terms of a bequest. After initially escaping, Bishopp was captured, charged with manslaughter and sentenced to be burnt on the hand. He was later pardoned on condition that he paid the annuity to the victim's elder brother, which he never did. He was nevertheless named Sheriff of Sussex in 1636.

In April 1640, Bishopp was elected MP for Bramber in the Short Parliament. He was re-elected in the Long Parliament in November 1640 until his election was declared void in December. He supported the King in the civil war and was governor of Arundel Castle on behalf of the King in 1643 and was taken prisoner at the surrender of the castle in January 1644. His estates were sequestrated and he compounded in October 1644. He was fined £7,500 in October 1645 which was later reduced to £4,790.

In about 1626 Bishopp married Mary Tufton, daughter of Nicholas Tufton, Earl of Thanet and Frances Cecil, the daughter of Thomas Cecil, Earl of Exeter and Dorothy Neville. Bishopp died at the age of about 47 and was succeeded briefly in the baronetcy by his son Thomas, born 3 Dec 1627. In 1651, Thomas, his mother Mary, and sisters Frances, Diana, Christina, and Mary, successfully appealed for the portion of Bishopp's estate that was intended for the maintenance of his widow and daughters to be released from sequestration. Thomas died unmarried and without issue in 1652 and was succeeded by his brother Cecil (c. 1635 – 3 June 1705).

Parliament of England
Preceded by Sir Thomas Farnfold; Edward Fraunceys	Member of Parliament for Steyning; 1626; With: Edward Fraunceys	Succeeded by Sir Edward Alford; Sir Thomas Farnfold
Vacant Parliament suspended since 1629	Member of Parliament for Bramber; 1640; With: Sir Thomas Bowyer, 1st Baronet; Arthur Onslow	Succeeded by Sir Thomas Bowyer, 1st Baronet; Arthur Onslow
Baronetage of England
Preceded by Thomas Bishopp	Baronet (of Parham); 1626–1649	Succeeded by Thomas Bishopp
