= Edward Fraunceys =

English politician

Edward Fraunceys (c. 1566–1626) was an English politician who sat in the House of Commons at various times between 1597 and 1626. His career was hampered by his marriage into an openly recusant family.

He came from a long-established Derbyshire family. He was the son of William Fraunceys of Ticknall and his wife Elizabeth Cotton, daughter of Sir George Cotton of Combermere Abbey, Cheshire, whose family later acquired the title Viscount Combermere. He had at least one brother Richard, who was apparently the elder of the two, and inherited the family estate in Derbyshire. Fraunceys may be the Edward Francis who was at Shrewsbury School in 1577 and at St John's College, Cambridge in 1582.

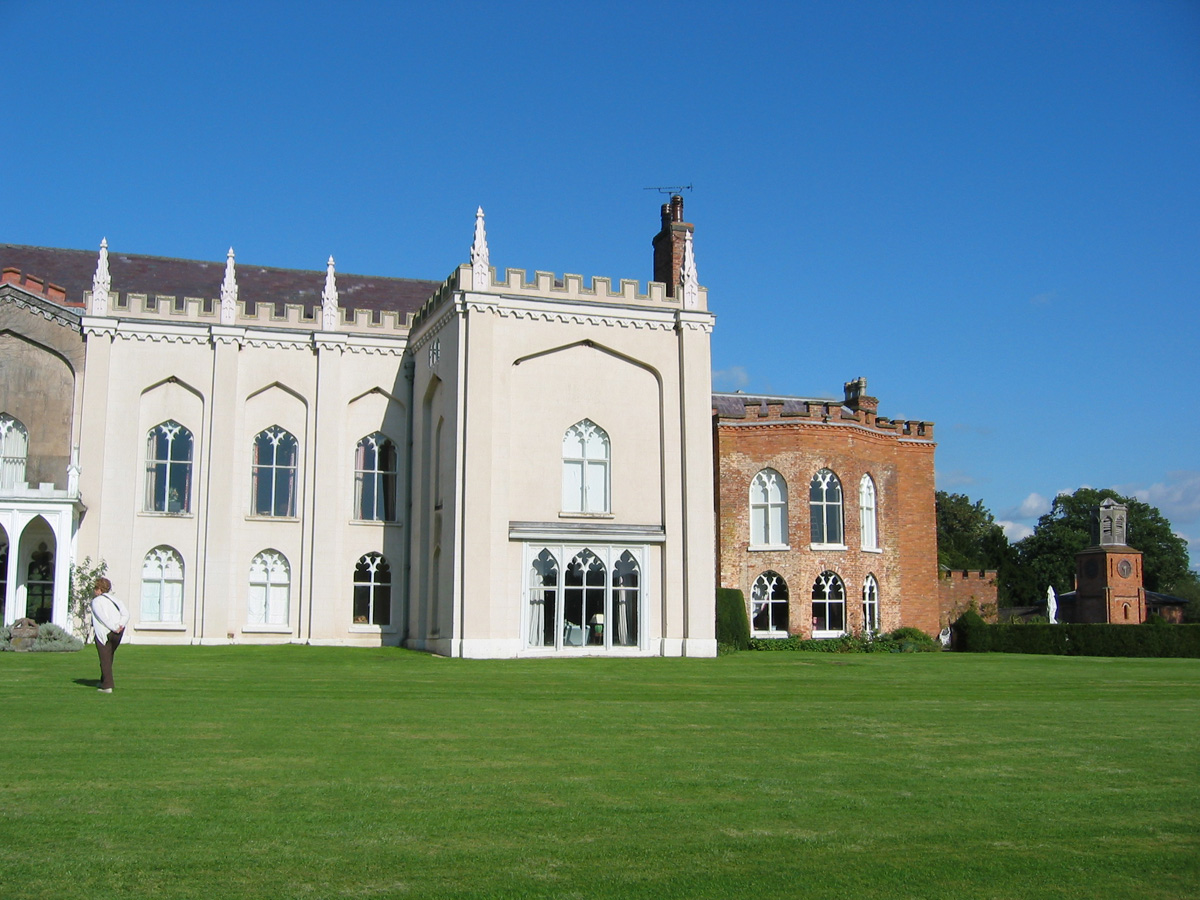
Combermere Abbey, the family home of Franceys's moyher Elizabeth Cotton

He was steward to Henry Percy, 9th Earl of Northumberland by 1594 and lived at the Earl's principal estate, Petworth, Sussex. In 1597, he was elected Member of Parliament for Beverley and re-elected for the same constituency in 1601. He was appointed, through Northumberland's influence, a Justice of the Peace for Sussex, and paymaster to the Honourable Band of Gentlemen Pensioners in 1603. He was knighted in 1605. In 1604 he was elected MP for Haslemere.

His promising political career was ruined by the Gunpowder Plot in 1605: his great patron Lord Northumberland was arrested on suspicion of complicity in the Plot and spent many years in the Tower of London as a result. Fraunceys, who was generally respected by his colleagues, was not personally suspected of involvement in the Plot, but the Crown could scarcely overlook the fact that his wife Elizabeth Astlowe and her father were both open Roman Catholics, and that his wife had recently been charged with recusancy, while her father's loyalty to the Crown was deeply suspect. For the rest of his life, he was forced to deny accusations that he practised the Catholic faith, or permitted his household to do so.

In 1614 he was elected MP for Steyning, and was re-elected for Steyning in 1621, 1624, 1625 and 1626, although he was troubled to the end by accusations of Roman Catholic sympathies. In his last years, he was described as being too "deathly sick" to attend Parliament.

Fraunceys married Elizabeth Astlowe, daughter of Edward Astlowe, a member of the Royal College of Physicians; their Catholic beliefs caused him a good deal of trouble in his career. He and Elizabeth had one daughter Bridget, who married Sir William Goring, 1st Baronet, by whom she had six children.

He died in May 1626 and was buried at St. Margaret's, Westminster.

Parliament of England
Preceded by John Mansfield; Edward Alford	Member of Parliament for Beverley; 1597–1601; With: Thomas Crompton 1597; Ralph Ewens	Succeeded by William Gee; Allan Percy
Preceded by Francis Wolley; John Clarke	Member of Parliament for Haslemere; 1604–1611; With: William Jackson	Succeeded by Sir Thomas Grimes; Sir William Browne
Preceded by Sir Thomas Bishopp; Sir Thomas Shirley	Member of Parliament for Steyning; 1614–1626; With: Sir Thomas Shirley 1614–1622; Sir Thomas Farnefold 1624–1625; Sir Edward Bishopp 1626	Succeeded by Edward Alford; Sir Thomas Farnefold
