= Pexall Brocas =

English politician

Sir Pexall Brocas (1563 – 13 August 1630) was an English politician. He sat as MP for Steyning in 1584.

He also served as master of the Queen's buckhounds from circa. 1584 till circa. 1603 and justice of the peace for Hampshire from circa. 1593.

He was the first son of Bernard Brocas and Anne, the daughter and coheiress of Sir Richard Pexall. He was educated at Brasenose College, Oxford in 1578, he entered Gray's Inn in 1580. He married Margaret, the daughter of Sir Thomas Shirley and had at least one son and one or two daughters. He was knighted in 1603.
