= Henry Shirley (dramatist) =

English dramatist

Henry Shirley (died 31 October 1627) was an English dramatist.

He was the second son of Sir Thomas Shirley of Wiston, Sussex and his first wife, Frances Vavasour.

Very little is known of Shirley's life other than his unfortunate death, which occurred in London at the Chancery Lane home of Sir Edward Bishopp, then a Member of Parliament for Steyning. Sir Edward was committed by the terms of a bequest to pay Shirley an annual annuity of £40 and the latter had called to collect it. Bishopp, reputedly drunk, attacked the unarmed playwright and ran him through with his sword. He then made his escape but was captured and sentenced to be burned on the hand. He was, however, later pardoned. Shirley was declared killed without descendants.

== Works ==
Shirley wrote several pieces, but as almost all of them were not printed, their titles are only known thanks to their inscription in the Register of Booksellers on 9 September 1653. They include:

- The Spanish Duke of Lerma
- The Duke of Guise
- The Dumb Bawd
- Giraldo, the Constant Lover

The only surviving piece is The Martyr'd Souldier, printed in 1638, "as it has been sundry times performed at Drury Lane Theater and other public theaters." According to the critic Sidney Lee, the piece is far from attractive, the work as a whole betraying the lack of professionalism of its author.
