= Sir Thomas Bowyer, 1st Baronet =

English politician

Sir Thomas Bowyer, 1st Baronet (28 November 1586 – February 1651) was an English politician who sat in the House of Commons at various times between 1614 and 1642. He supported the Royalist cause in the English Civil War.

Bowyer was the son of Thomas Bowyer, of Leighthorne, Sussex, and his second wife Jane Birch, daughter of John Birch, Baron of the Exchequer, and was baptised on 4 December 1586 in Mundham in Sussex. His father died on 7 March 1595 when he succeeded to the estates. In 1614, he was elected member of parliament (MP) for Midhurst. He was elected MP for Bramber in 1621, and was re-elected in 1624, 1625 and 1626. He was a High Sheriff of Surrey and High Sheriff of Sussex between 1626 and 1627. On 23 July 1627, he was created a baronet, of Leighthorne in the County of Sussex. He was re-elected MP for Bramber in 1629 and sat until 1629 when King Charles decided to rule without parliament for eleven years.

In April 1640, Bowyer was elected MP for Bramber in the Short Parliament. He was not initially elected to the Long Parliament in November 1640, but the election was declared void and he was re-elected in a by-election. He sat until 23 November 1642 when he was disabled for assisting in putting a garrison into Chichester for the King. He was fined £2,033 as a delinquent on 18 May 1650.

Bowyer was buried in Mundham on 28 February 1651.

Bowyer married firstly Anne Stoughton, daughter of Adrian Stoughton, and around 1634 secondly Jane Stoughton, widow of Sir George Stoughton and daughter of Emery Cranley. He married a third time around 1642 to Anne. He had a son, Thomas, by his second wife, a son James, by his third wife, as well as twelve other children.

Parliament of England
Preceded by Francis Nevile; Sir Richard Weston	Member of Parliament for Midhurst; 1614; With: William Courteman	Succeeded by John Smith; Richard Lewknor
Preceded by Sir John Leeds; Henry Shelley	Member of Parliament for Bramber; 1621–1629; With: Robert Morley 1621–1624; Walter Barttelot 1625–1626; Sir Sackville Crowe 1628–1629	Parliament suspended until 1640
Parliament suspended since 1629	Member of Parliament for Bramber; 1640; With: Sir Edward Bishopp	Succeeded by Sir Edward Bishopp; Arthur Onslow
Preceded by Sir Edward Bishopp; Arthur Onslow	Member of Parliament for Bramber; 1640–1642; With: Arthur Onslow	Succeeded by Arthur Onslow; James Temple
Baronetage of England
New creation	Baronet (of Leighthorne); 1627–1650	Succeeded by Thomas Bowyer
