= John Leedes =

English landowner and politician

Sir John Leedes (died 1656) of Wappingthorne, near Steyning, Sussex was an English landowner and politician who sat in the House of Commons from 1614 to 1640.

Leedes was the son of Thomas Leedes of Wappingthorne and his wife Mary Leedes, daughter of Thomas Leedes of North Milford, Yorkshire. He was knighted at Whitehall on 8 January 1611 as of Surrey or Sussex. He and his parents owned property in Sussex, part of which was sold in 1612.

He was elected Member of Parliament for Bramber in 1614.

In 1621 he was elected Member of Parliament for New Shoreham, but was disabled from sitting on grounds he had not properly taken his oath of allegiance, causing a by-election in February that year. He then sat for Steyning in the Short Parliament of 1640.

Leedes died in 1656 and his will was proved in 1658. He had married a daughter of Sir Thomas Monson of South Carlton, Lincolnshire. His son Thomas who was MP for Steyning in 1640, was killed near Oxford, in 1645.

Parliament of England
Preceded by Lord Howard of Effingham; Thomas Shelley	Member of Parliament for New Shoreham; 1621–1621; With: Sir John Morley	Succeeded by Inigo Jones; Sir John Morley
