= Bernard Brocas (16th-century MP) =

English politician

Bernard Brocas (by 1536 – 20 March 1589) was an English politician. He sat as MP for Buckingham in 1558.

He was the first son of Robert Brocas (died 6 August 1557) and Dorothy, the daughter of Richard Ruthall. By 1557, he married Anne, the first daughter and coheiress of Sir Richard Pexall. He had one son (Pexall Brocas) and three daughters.
