= Thomas Shirley (died 1612) =

English Member of Parliament, government official and courtier

Sir Thomas Shirley (c.1542 – October 1612), of Wiston in Sussex, was an English Member of Parliament, government official and courtier who is said to have suggested the creation of the title of baronet.

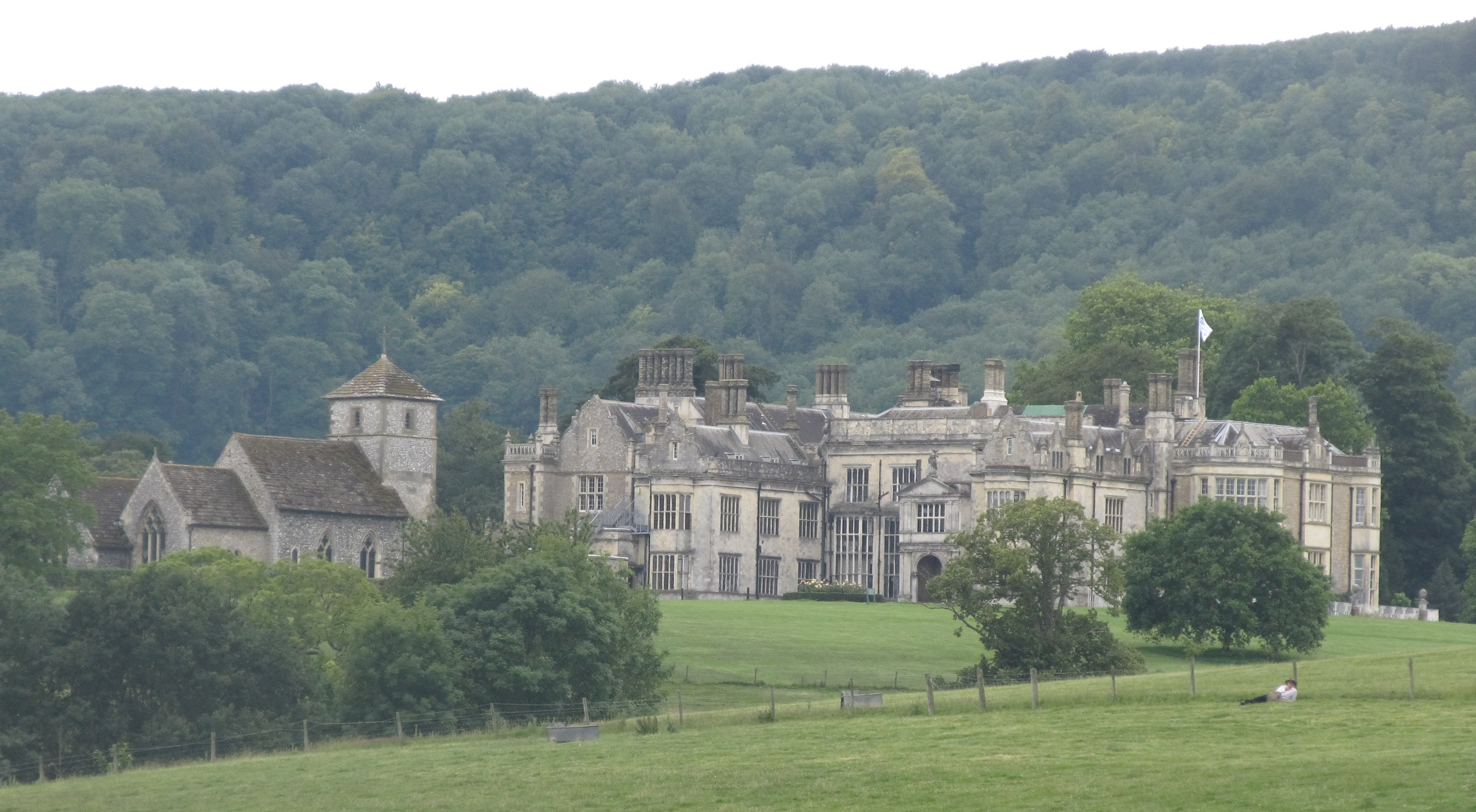
Wiston House today

== Family ==
Thomas Shirley was the eldest of the three children of William Sherley (c.1498–1551) of Wiston, Sussex, and Mary Isley, the daughter of Thomas Isley of Sundridge, Kent.

== Career ==
He was knighted in 1573, and served as High Sheriff of Surrey and Sussex in 1576. Also in 1573, he began rebuilding the family seat of Wiston House, which he turned into a massive country house. (It is now the site of the government's Wilton Park conference centre.)

However, soon afterwards Shirley found himself in considerable financial difficulties which eventually swallowed the family fortune. In 1586 Queen Elizabeth I appointed Sir Thomas Treasurer-at-War to the English forces serving in the Netherlands during the Dutch Revolt. This gave him the power to speculate with the funds that passed through his hands (a normal perk of office at this period), but he so mishandled them that he contracted massive debts to the Crown and found himself accused of fraud. His estate, including Wiston House, was sequestered in 1602, though he continued to live at Wiston until his death in October 1612.

Sir Thomas was elected to Parliament as MP for Sussex in 1584, representing the county for many years, and then Steyning, in 1601 and 1604, which was controlled by Shirley as a pocket borough; he was apparently not distinguished as a member, but tried to draw upon an MP's privilege of immunity from arrest in 1604 when his debts grew too pressing to meet. Despite his protests that he had parliamentary privilege, he was arrested at the instigation of a goldsmith called Simpson, to whom he owed money, and placed in the Fleet Prison. The House of Commons of England made a number of attempts to order his release by issuing writs of habeas corpus, but the Warden of the Fleet Prison would not free him, unless he received assurance that he would not himself be held liable for Shirley's debts, or blamed for what might technically be seen as allowing an 'escape'. The Commons had the warden placed in the Tower of London and sent the sergeant-at-arms of the Commons, who was carrying the mace, to the Fleet Prison to set Shirley free. However, the warden's wife proved equally obdurate, and the sergeant-at-arms had to report that his mission had been a failure. The warden had originally been able to move around within the Tower, but now the Commons made sure that he was placed in an unpleasant dungeon, called the Little Ease, four feet (1.2 metres) square, within the Tower. This persuaded the warden to release Shirley, and he also had to apologise on his knees to the House of Commons. Shirley then resumed his seat as an MP. Parliament subsequently passed a general act, the Privilege of Parliament Act 1603 (1 Jas. 1. c. 13), which confirmed the privilege of freedom from arrest for Members, but also gave creditors an opportunity to recover what they were owed when the debtor ceased being an MP. This case is generally regarded as having finally settled the question of privilege from arrest in the Commons’ favour, and was cited as Sir Thomas Shirley's Case for centuries afterwards.

His sons Thomas, Anthony and Robert were all noted adventurers.

== Marriage and issue ==
Shirley married, about 1559, Anne Kempe (c.1542–1623), the daughter of Sir Thomas Kempe (d.1591) of Wye, Kent, by whom he had twelve children, of whom three died as infants. Shirley was survived by three sons and six daughters:

- Sir Thomas Shirley (1564–1633/4), who married firstly Frances Vavasour, by whom he had three sons, including the playwright, Henry Shirley, and four daughters, and secondly Judith Bennett, the daughter of William Bennett of London, and the widow of a husband surnamed Taylor, by whom he had five sons and six daughters.
- Sir Anthony Shirley (1565–1636?), who married Frances Vernon (baptised 1573), the daughter of Sir John Vernon of Hodnet, Shropshire.
- Robert Shirley (c. 1581 – 1628), who married Sampsonia (c. 1590 – 1668), the daughter of Isma‘il Khan, by whom he had an only son, Henry Shirley.
- Cecily Shirley (c.1579-Aft.1661), who was married on 25 November 1596 to Thomas West, 3rd Lord LaWarr (1577–1618) in the lifetime of his parents Thomas West, 2nd Lord LaWarr (c.1550-1602) and Ann Knollys, daughter of Sir Francis Knollys and Katherine Cary, first cousin to Queen Elizabeth I Tudor. The 3rd Lord LaWarr was the first Governor of the Virginia Colony with Letters of Patent granted by King James I Stewart. Cecily and Lord Thomas were the parents of 9 known children, including son and heir Henry West born c.1598.
- Mary Shirley, who married Sir John Crofts of Saxham, Suffolk. Her children included Henry Crofts and Cecilia Crofts.
- Anne Shirley, who married John Tracy, 1st Viscount Tracy, of Toddington, Gloucestershire.
- Elizabeth Shirley (died 1630), who married Edward Onslow of Knowle, Esquire.
- Margaret Shirley (Abt. Jul 1567-Aft. May 1645), who married before 1 November 1584 to Sir Pexall Brocas, son of Bernard Brocas of Horton, Buckinghamshire and Ann Pexsall, daughter of Sir Richard Pecksall of Beaurepaire and Steventon in Hampshire and Alianor Paulet, daughter of William Paulet 1st Marquis Winchester and Elizabeth Capel. Margaret and Pexall were the parents of Thomas Brocas Esq. of Beaurepaire and possibly a daughter named Margaret. Sir Pexall was knighted in 1603.
- Jane Shirley, who married Sir John Shirley (1569–1631) of Isfield, Sussex.
- Henry Shirley, Died as an infant.
- Eleanor Shirley, Died as an infant.
- Edward Shirley, Died as an infant.

== Bibliography ==
- Brydges, Egerton (1791). "History of Wiston, in Sussex, the Ancient Seat of the Brews's, Shirleys, Foggs and Gorings". The Topographer. IV (XXVII). London: J. Robson: 331–6.
- Kathman, David (2004). "Shirley, Henry (1591x7–1627)". Oxford Dictionary of National Biography (online ed.). Oxford University Press. doi:10.1093/ref:odnb/25425. (Subscription, Wikipedia Library access or UK public library membership required.)
- Pennington, Janet (2004). "Sherley, Sir Thomas (c.1542–1612)". Oxford Dictionary of National Biography (online ed.). Oxford University Press. doi:10.1093/ref:odnb/25435. (Subscription, Wikipedia Library access or UK public library membership required.)
- Raiswell, Richard (2004). "Sherley, Sir Thomas (1564–1633/4)". Oxford Dictionary of National Biography (online ed.). Oxford University Press. doi:10.1093/ref:odnb/25436. (Subscription, Wikipedia Library access or UK public library membership required.)
- Raiswell, Richard (2004). "Sherley, Anthony, Count Sherley in the nobility of the Holy Roman empire (1565–1636?)". Oxford Dictionary of National Biography (online ed.). Oxford University Press. doi:10.1093/ref:odnb/25423. (Subscription, Wikipedia Library access or UK public library membership required.)
- Raiswell, Richard (2004). "Shirley, Sir Robert, Count Shirley in the papal nobility (c.1581–1628)". Oxford Dictionary of National Biography (online ed.). Oxford University Press. doi:10.1093/ref:odnb/25433. (Subscription, Wikipedia Library access or UK public library membership required.)
