= Steyning (constituency) =

Parliamentary constituency in the United Kingdom, 1801–1832

- Former borough constituency for the House of Commons

1467–1832
- Seats: Two
- Replaced by: New Shoreham

Steyning was a parliamentary borough in Sussex, England, which elected two Members of Parliament (MPs) to the House of Commons sporadically from 1298 and continuously from 1467 until 1832. It was a notorious rotten borough, and was abolished by the Great Reform Act.

== History ==
The borough comprised the small market town of Steyning in Sussex, which consisted of little more than a single long street; yet despite its size it not only elected its own two MPs but contained most of the borough of Bramber, which had two of its own. (Between the 13th and 15th centuries, Bramber and Steyning were a single borough returning MPs to most Parliaments, sometimes called by one name and sometimes by the other, but after 1467 both were separately represented. Until 1792 it was theoretically possible for a house to confer on its occupier a vote in both boroughs.) In 1831, the population of the borough was just over 1,000, and the town contained 218 houses.

At the time of the Reform Act, the right to vote was exercised by the constable and all inhabitant householders paying scot and lot and not receiving alms; this was a liberal franchise for the period, though it amounted to only around 118 voters by the time the borough was abolished. The householders seem historically to have had the right to vote, but the question was the subject of litigation through most of the 18th century. Between 1715 and 1792, the right was instead restricted to occupiers of "ancient houses" and of houses built on the site of ancient houses, in effect a burgage franchise; but the restoration of the householders' rights does not seem to have increased the electorate substantially, suggesting that most of the houses significant enough for their tenants to be rated for scot and lot had the status of burgage tenements.

For most of the borough's existence, the majority of the qualified voters were tenants of one or two landowners, who therefore had considerable influence if not total control of the choice of MP. (Indeed, Steyning was cited by Thomas Oldfield, the contemporary historian of electoral abuses in the unreformed House of Commons, as an example of a borough where tenancies were granted for the sole purpose of ensuring that the electorate consisted of pliable voters.)

The state of the borough in the 18th century was described in a local agent's letter to the former prime minister, the Duke of Newcastle, in 1767:

"There are 102 in number who claim a right of voting, but not more than 90 whose claim will bear a scrutiny. Out of this number Sir John Honywood has 40 tenants who at present are all disposed to stand by him, and about six or seven others who are full as closely attached to him as any of his tenants. This gives him nearly or quite a majority of the 90 real votes. The rest are all a rope of sand and may be had by anybody." - Letter of Thomas Steele to the Duke of Newcastle, 6 February 1767, quoted by Namier & Brooke

As the letter hints, Honywood's control was not quite absolute and he could not always secure both seats for his candidates. The 1792 ruling on the franchise, moving the vote from the burgage holders to all the householders paying scot and lot, shifted the balance of power over to the Duke of Norfolk (who owned most of the properties that were not classed as ancient houses), and he subsequently bought out Honywood's interest. But he was careful to secure his investment by financing many improvements in the town.

Steyning was abolished as a constituency by the Reform Act, being thereafter included in the borough of New Shoreham (which had earlier been expanded to include the whole of the Rape of Bramber as a remedy for corruption).

== Members of Parliament ==
=== MPs 1467–1640 ===
Parliament	First member	Second member
1510-1523	No names known	
1529	Thomas Shirley	John Morris
1536	?	
1539	?	
1542	John Bowyer	?
1545	?	
1547	Robert Rudston	Henry Fauxe
1553 (Mar)	Sir Richard Blount	William Cordell
1553 (Oct)	John Southcote II	David Lewis
1554 (Apr)	Gilbert Gerard	Edward Stradling
1554 (Nov)	John Roberts	William Pellatt
1555	Robert Byng	?
1558	Richard Onslow	Robert Colshill
1559	Edmund Wright	Robert Keilway
1562–3	Richard Onslow	Robert Harris
1571	Richard Browne	John Farnham
1572	John Cowper	Richard Pellatt
1584	Sir Thomas Shirley (1564 - 1633–4)	Pexall Brocas
1586	Thomas Bishop	Henry Shelley
1588	Thomas Crompton	Henry Apsley
1593	Sir Walter Waller	Sir Thomas Shirley (1564 - 1633–4)
1597	John Shurley	Thomas Shirley III
1601	Sir Thomas Shirley (1542–1612)	Robert Bowyer
1604–1611	Sir Thomas Bishopp	Sir Thomas Shirley (1542–1612)
1614	Sir Thomas Shirley (1564 - 1633–4)	Edward Fraunceys
1621	Sir Thomas Shirley (1564 - 1633–4)	Edward Fraunceys
1624	Sir Thomas Farnfold	Edward Fraunceys
1625	Sir Thomas Farnfold	Edward Fraunceys
1626	Sir Edward Bishopp	Edward Fraunceys
1628	Sir Edward Alford	Sir Thomas Farnfold
1629–1640	No Parliaments convened	

=== MPs 1640–1832 ===
Year	First member	First party	Second member	Second party
April 1640	Sir John Leedes	Royalist	Sir Thomas Farnefold	Royalist
Nov 1640	Thomas Leedes	Royalist	Sir Thomas Farnefold	Royalist
November 1642	Leedes disabled from sitting - seat vacant		Sir Thomas Farnefold	Royalist
March 1643	Leedes disabled from sitting - seat vacant		Farnefold died - seat vacant	
1645	Edward Apsley		Herbert Board	
1648	Edward Apsley		Board died - seat vacant	
1653	Steyning was unrepresented in the Barebones Parliament and the First and Second Parliaments of the Protectorate			
January 1659	Anthony Shirley		Sir John Trevor	
May 1659	Steyning was not represented in the restored Rump			
April 1660	Henry Goring		Sir John Fagg	
July 1660	John Eversfield		Sir John Fagg	
1661	Sir Henry Goring		Sir John Fagg	
1679	John Tufton		Sir John Fagg	
January 1681	Philip Gell		Sir John Fagg	
February 1681	Sir James Morton		Sir John Fagg	
March 1685	Sir Henry Goring		Sir John Fagg	
June 1685	Sir James Morton		Sir John Fagg	
1690	Robert Fagg		Sir John Fagg	
1695	Sir Edward Hungerford		Sir John Fagg	
March 1701	Sir Edward Hungerford		Sir Robert Fagg	
April 1701	Sir Edward Hungerford		Charles Goring	
November 1701	Sir Robert Fagg		Charles Goring	
1702	Sir Edward Hungerford		Charles Goring	
1705	William Wallis		Charles Goring	
1708	Robert Fagg		Viscount Tunbridge	Whig
1709	Robert Fagg		Sir Henry Goring	
1710	William Wallis		Sir Henry Goring	
1712	The Lord Bellew of Duleek		Sir Henry Goring	
April 1713	Robert Leeves		Sir Henry Goring	
September 1713	William Wallis		Sir Henry Goring	
1715	Major General John Pepper		Robert Leeves	
1717	Major General John Pepper		William Wallis	
1722	Major General John Pepper		John Gumley	
1726	Marquess of Carnarvon		John Gumley	
April 1727	William Stanhope		John Gumley	
August 1727	The Viscount Vane		Thomas Bladen	
1734	Sir Robert Fagg, Bt		Marquess of Carnarvon	
1740	Hitch Younge		Marquess of Carnarvon	
1741	Hitch Younge		Charles Eversfield	
1747	Hitch Younge		Abraham Hume	
1754	Hitch Younge		Alexander Hume	
1759	Frazer Honywood		Alexander Hume	
1761	Frazer Honywood		John Thomlinson	
1764	Richard Fuller		John Thomlinson	
1767	Richard Fuller		Sir John Filmer	
1768	Thomas Edwards Freeman I		Sir John Filmer	
1774	Thomas Edwards Freeman I		Filmer Honywood	
September 1780	Sir Thomas Skipwith		Filmer Honywood	
November 1780	Sir Thomas Skipwith		Colonel John Bullock	
1784	Sir John Honywood		Hon. Richard Howard	
1785	Thomas Edwards-Freeman II		Hon. Richard Howard	
1788	Sir John Honywood		Hon. Richard Howard	
1790	James Lloyd	Whig	Henry Thomas Howard	Whig
7 March 1791	Sir John Honywood	Tory	John Curtis	Tory
24 March 1791	James Lloyd	Whig	John Curtis	Tory
1792	Samuel Whitbread	Tory	John Curtis	Tory
1794	Samuel Whitbread	Tory	John Henniker-Major	Whig
1796	James Lloyd	Whig	John Henniker-Major	Whig
1802	James Lloyd	Whig	Robert Hurst	Whig
1803	James Lloyd	Whig	Lord Ossulston	Whig
February 1806	Sir Arthur Leary Piggott	Whig	Lord Ossulston	Whig
October 1806	James Lloyd	Whig	Robert Hurst	Whig
1812	James Lloyd	Whig	Sir John Aubrey	Whig
1818	George Philips	Whig	Sir John Aubrey	Whig
1820	George Richard Philips	Whig	Lord Henry Howard-Molyneux-Howard	Whig
1824	George Richard Philips	Whig	Henry Howard	Whig
1826	George Richard Philips	Whig	Peter du Cane	Whig
1830	George Richard Philips	Whig	Edward Blount	Whig
1832	Constituency abolished			
