= Short Parliament =

Parliament of England, April–May 1640

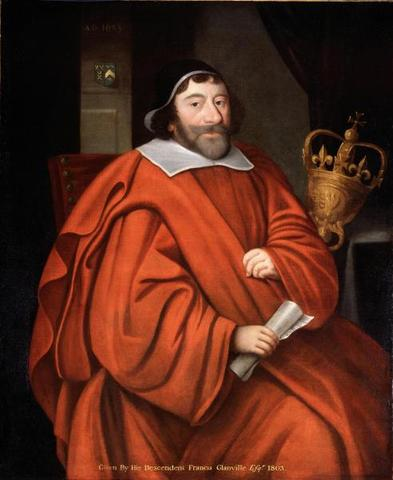
Sir John Glanville, Speaker

The Short Parliament was a Parliament of England that was summoned by King Charles I of England on 20 February 1640 and sat from 13 April to 5 May 1640. It was so called because of its short session of only three weeks.

After 11 years of personal rule between 1629 and 1640, and on the advice of the Earl of Strafford, Charles recalled Parliament to obtain money to finance his on-going military struggle with Scotland. However, like its predecessors, the new parliament had more interest in redressing grievances than in voting the King funds for his war against the Scottish Covenanters.

John Pym, MP for Tavistock, quickly emerged as a major figure in debate; his long speech on 17 April expressed the refusal of the House of Commons to vote subsidies unless royal abuses were addressed. John Hampden, in contrast, was persuasive in private: he sat on nine committees. A flood of petitions concerning royal abuses were coming up to Parliament from the country. Charles's offer to cease the levying of ship money did not impress the House.

Annoyed with the resumption of debate on Crown privilege and the violation of parliamentary privilege by the arrest of the nine members in 1629, and unnerved about an upcoming scheduled debate on the deteriorating situation in Scotland, Charles dissolved Parliament on 5 May 1640, after only three weeks' sitting. This led to major discontent, particularly in London, and the following week a large armed mob attacked Lambeth Palace in the hope of capturing the unpopular Archbishop, William Laud, who was popularly blamed for the dissolution. In August 1640, a Scots Covenanter army invaded and occupied parts of northern England. The truce which followed compelled the King to call another parliament which he could not dissolve. This became known as the Long Parliament.

== See also ==
- List of MPs elected to the English parliament in 1640 (April)
- List of parliaments of England
