= List of MPs elected to the English parliament in 1601 =

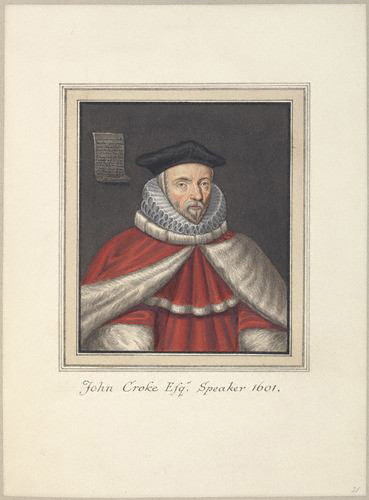
Sir John Croke, Speaker

This is a list of members of Parliament (MPs) elected to the tenth and last parliament in the reign of Queen Elizabeth I in 1601.

The Parliament met on 7 October 1601 and lasted until 29 December 1601 when it was dissolved.

== List of constituencies and members ==
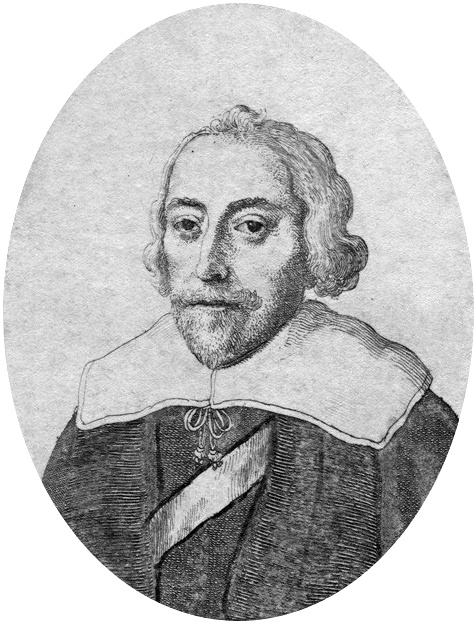
Oliver St John, Bedfordshire

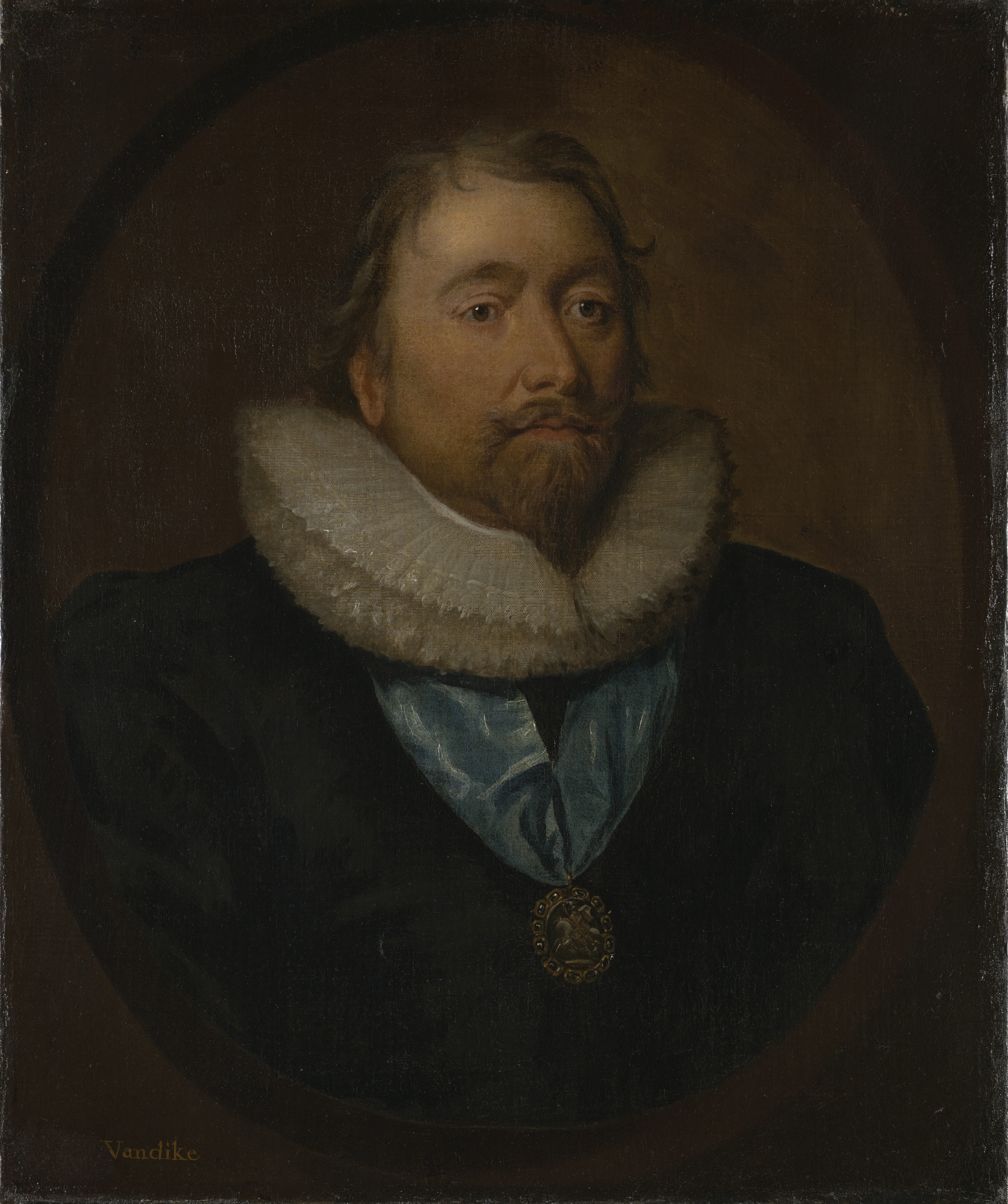
Sir Richard Weston, Maldon

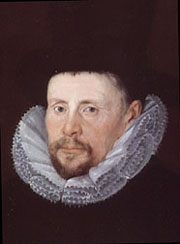
Thomas Fleiming, Southampton

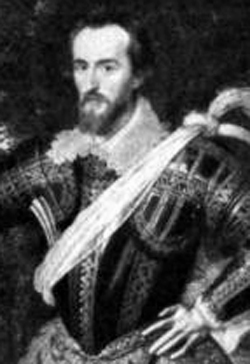
Sir James Scudamore, Herefordshire

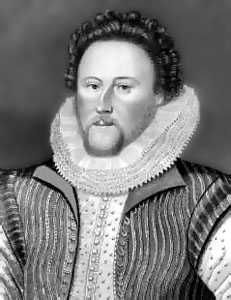
Sir Henry Neville, Kent

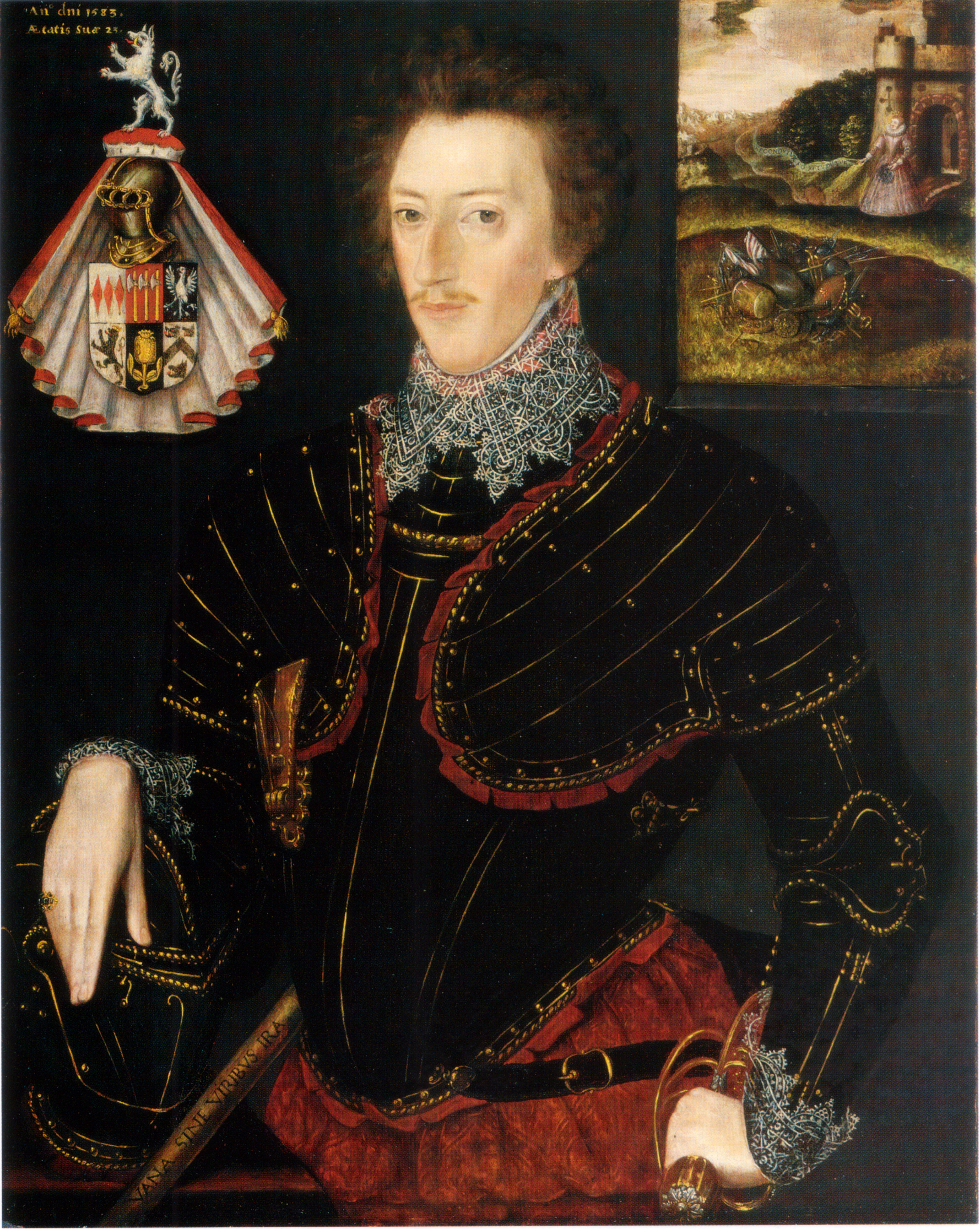
Sir Edward Hoby, Rochester

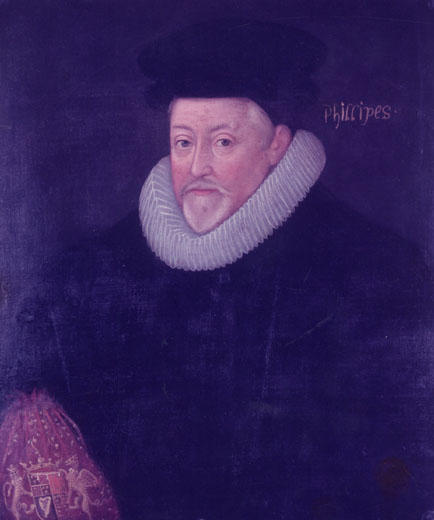
Sir Edward Phelips - Somerset

=== Bedfordshire ===
Constituency	Members	Notes
Bedfordshire	Hon. Oliver St John; Sir Edward Radclyffe	
Bedford	Humphrey Winche; Thomas Fanshawe	
=== Berkshire ===
Constituency	Members	Notes
Berkshire	Sir Richard Lovelace; George Hyde	
Windsor	Julius Caesar; John Norreys	
Reading	Francis Moore; Anthony Blagrove	
Wallingford	Sir John Herbert; Henry Doyley	Herbert chose for Glamorgan - replaced by Thomas Fortescue
Abingdon	Robert Ryche	
=== Buckinghamshire ===
Constituency	Members	Notes
Buckinghamshire	Francis Fortescue; Alexander Hampden	
Buckingham	Christopher Hatton; Robert Newdigate II	
Wycombe	Richard Blount; Henry Fleetwood	
Aylesbury	John Lyly; Richard More	
=== Cambridgeshire ===
Constituency	Members	Notes
Cambridgeshire	Sir John Cotton; Sir John Cutts	
Cambridge	Robert Wallis; John Yaxley	
=== Cheshire ===
Constituency	Members	Notes
Cheshire	Sir Thomas Holcroft; Peter Legh	
City of Chester	Thomas Gamull; Hugh Glasier	
=== Cornwall ===
Constituency	Members	Notes
Cornwall	Sir Walter Raleigh; John Arundell	
Launceston	John Parker; George Downhall	
Liskeard	Thomas Edmunds; Sampson Lennard	
Lostwithiel	Richard Cromwell; Nicholas Saunders	
Truro	William Daniel; Thomas Harris	
Bodmin	William Lower; John Pigot	
Helston	Sir William Twysden, 1st Baronet; Hannibal Vyvyan	
Saltash	Sir Robert Cross; Alexander Nevill	
Westlow	John Hare; Richard Verney	
Grampound	John Gray; John Astell	
Eastlow	John Hanham; Robert Yardley	
Camelford	William Carnesew; Anthony Turpin	
Penryn	Sir Edward Seymour, 2nd Baronet; Richard Messenger	
Tregoney	Lewis Darte; Thomas Trevor	
St Ives	Thomas St Aubyn; Thomas Barton	
Mitchel	Sir George Chudleigh, 1st Baronet; William Cholmley	
Bossiney	William Hakewill; Jerome Horsey	
Fowey	Carew Raleigh; Sir William Courtney	
St Germans	George Carew; John Osborne	
St Mawes	Sir Robert Killigrew; Ralph Hare	
Newport	Tobie Matthew; Sir John Leigh	
Callington	Miles Raynesford; John Rolle	
=== Cumberland ===
Constituency	Members	Notes
Cumberland	William Huddleston; Gerard Lowther	
Carlisle	Henry Scrope; John Dudley	
=== Derbyshire ===
Constituency	Members	Notes
Derbyshire	Francis Leeke; Peter Fretchville	
Derby	John Baxter; Peter Eure	
=== Devon ===
Constituency	Members	Notes
Devon	Edward Seymour; William Courtenay	
Exeter	John Hele serjeant at law John Howell	
Totnes	Leonard Darr; Philip Holditch	
Barnstaple	Richard Martin; Edward Hancock	
Plymouth	James Bagg (merchant); William Stallenger	
Plympton Erle	Sir William Strode; John Hele	
Tavistock	Henry Grey; Walter Wentworth	
Bere Alston	Charles Lister; John Langford	
Clifton Dartmouth Hardness	John Traherne; William Bastard	
=== Dorset ===
Constituency	Members	Notes
Dorset	George Trenchard; Sir Edmund Uvedale	
Dorchester	Matthew Chubbe; Sir Henry Brounker	
Poole	Robert Meller; Thomas Billet	
Shaftesbury	Arthur Messenger; John Budden	
Weymouth	Sir John Peyton; Walter Cope	
Melcombe Regis	Richard Swayne; Edward Reynolds	
Lyme Regis	John FitzJames; Nicholas Throckmorton	Nicholas Throckmorton became Nicholas Carew
Wareham	Sir John Stafford; Edmund Scott	
Bridport	Sir Robert Napier; Richard Warburton	
Corfe Castle	John Durning; John Davies	
=== Essex ===
Constituency	Members	Notes
Essex	Henry Maynard; Sir Francis Barrington Bt	
Colchester	Robert Barker; Richard Symnell	
Maldon	Richard Weston; William Wiseman	
=== Gloucestershire ===
Constituency	Members	Notes
Gloucestershire	John Throckmorton; Sir Edward Wynter	
Gloucester	Luke Garnons; William Oldsworth	
Cirencester	Richard Browne; Richard George	
=== Hampshire ===
Constituency	Members	Notes
Hampshire	Sir Henry Wallop; Sir Edward More	
Winchester	Thomas Fleming; Edward Cole	
Southampton	Thomas Fleming; Thomas Lambert	
Portsmouth	John Moore; Edward Jones	
Petersfield	Sir William Kingswell; John Swynnerton	
Yarmouth	William Cotton; Stephen Theobald	
Newport	Richard James; Thomas Crompton	
Newtown	Robert Wroth; Robert Bruce Cotton	
Lymington	Sir Francis Darcy; Thomas Ridley	
Christchurch	Simon Willis; Henry Meere	
Stockbridge	Edward Savage; Thomas Grimes	
Whitchurch	Thomas Henshaw; Thomas Crompton	
Andover	Henry Ludlow; Nicholas Hyde	
=== Herefordshire ===
Constituency	Members	Notes
Herefordshire	Thomas Coningsby; Sir Herbert Croft	
Hereford	Walter Hardman; Thomas Jones	
Leominster	Thomas Coningsby; John Warnecombe	
=== Hertfordshire ===
Constituency	Members	Notes
Hertfordshire	Henry Cary, 1st Viscount Falkland; Sir Robert Cecil	
St Albans	Francis Bacon; Adolph Carey	Bacon chosen for Ipswich replaced by Henry Frowick
=== Huntingdonshire ===
Constituency	Members	Notes
Huntingdonshire	Sir Gervase Clifton; Oliver Cromwell	
Huntingdon	William Beecher; Thomas Chicheley	
=== Kent ===
Constituency	Members	Notes
Kent	Francis Fane; Sir Henry Nevill	
Canterbury	John Boys; John Rogers	
Rochester	Sir Edward Hoby (Sir) Thomas Walsingham (elder)	
Queenborough	Sir Michael Sondes; Nicholas Troughton	
Maidstone	Sir Thomas Fludd; Sir John Leveson	
=== Lancashire ===
Constituency	Members	Notes
Lancashire	Sir Richard Hoghton; Sir Thomas Hesketh	
Preston	John Brograve; William Waad	
Lancaster	Sir Jerome Bowes; Sir Carew Reynell	
Newton	Thomas Langton; Richard Ashton	
Wigan	Roger Downes; John Pulteney	
Clitheroe	John Osbaldestone; Anthony Dering	
Liverpool	Edward Anderson; Hugh Calverley	
=== Leicestershire ===
Constituency	Members	Notes
Leicestershire	Henry Hastings; William Skipwith	
Leicester	George Belgrave; William Herrick	
=== Lincolnshire ===
Constituency	Members	Notes
Lincolnshire	Sir William Wray; John Sheffield	
Lincoln	George Anton; Francis Bullingham	
Boston	Anthony Irby; Henry Capell	
Grimsby	Lord Clinton and Saye; Edward Skipwith	
Stamford	Sir Robert Wingfield; Edward Watson	
Grantham	Oliver Manners; Thomas Horsman	
=== Middlesex ===
Constituency	Members	Notes
Middlesex	Sir Robert Wroth; John Fortescue	
Westminster	Thomas Knyvet; Sir William Cooke	
City of London	Sir Stephen Soame; John Croke; Thomas Fettiplace; John Pynder	
=== Monmouthshire ===
Constituency	Members	Notes
Monmouthshire	Thomas Somerset; Henry Morgan	
Monmouth Boroughs	Sir Robert Johnson	
=== Norfolk ===
Constituency	Members	Notes
Norfolk	Henry Gawdy; Bassingbourne Gawdy	
Norwich	Alexander Thurston; John Pettus	
King's Lynn	Sir Robert Mansell; Thomas Oxborough	
Yarmouth	Henry Hobart; Thomas Damet	
Thetford	Henry Warner; Thomas Knyvet, 1st Baron Knyvet	
Castle Rising	John Peyton; Robert Townsend	
=== Northamptonshire ===
Constituency	Members	Notes
Northamptonshire	Sir John Stanhope; Sir William Lane	
Peterborough	Nicholas Tufton; Goddard Pemberton	
Northampton	Henry Hickman; Francis Tate	
Brackley	Sir Edward Montagu; John Donne	
Higham Ferrers	Henry Montagu	
=== Northumberland ===
Constituency	Members	Notes
Northumberland	Sir Robert Carey; William Selby	
Newcastle	George Selby; William Jenison II	
Morpeth	George Savile; John Browne	
Berwick upon Tweed	William Selby; David Waterhouse	
=== Nottinghamshire ===
Constituency	Members	Notes
Nottinghamshire	Sir Charles Cavendish; Robert Pierrepont	
Nottingham	William Gregory; William Greaves	
East Retford	Roger Manners; Robert Kydman	
=== Oxfordshire ===
Constituency	Members	Notes
Oxfordshire	Sir William Knollys; Ralph Warcoppe	
Oxford	Sir Francis Leigh; George Calfield	
Woodstock	Lawrence Tanfield; William Scott	
Banbury	Anthony Cope	
=== Rutland ===
Constituency	Members	Notes
Rutland	Sir John Harington (Sir) Andrew Noel	Noel's election declared void, November 1601 as he was at the time Sheriff of Rutland. Replaced by Edward Noel
=== Salop ===
Constituency	Members	Notes
Shropshire	John Egerton; Roger Owen	
Shrewsbury	Reginald Scriven; John Barker	
Bridgnorth	Thomas Horde; Edward Bromley	
Ludlow	Robert Berry; Thomas Canland	
Wenlock	John Brett; William Leighton	
Bishops Castle	Hayward Townsend; Alexander King	
=== Somerset ===
Constituency	Members	Notes
Somerset	(Sir) Edward Phelips; Sir Maurice Berkeley	
Bristol	George Snigge; John Hopkins	
Bath	William Sharestone; William Heath	
Wells	James Kirton; George Upton	
Taunton	John Bond; Daniel Donne	
Bridgwater	Sir Francis Hastings; Alexander Popham	
Minehead	Francis James; Lewis Lashbrooke	
=== Staffordshire ===
Constituency	Members	Notes
Staffordshire	Thomas Gerard; Sir John Egerton	
Lichfield	Anthony Dyott; Robert Browne	
Stafford	Sir Edward Stafford; William Essex	
Newcastle under Lyme	Edward Mainwaring; Thomas Trentham	
Tamworth	George Egeock; Robert Burdett (died 1603)	
=== Suffolk ===
Constituency	Members	Notes
Suffolk	Sir Henry Glemham; Calthrop Parker	
Ipswich	Sir Michael Stanhope; Francis Bacon	
Dunwich	John Suckling; Francis Myngate	
Orford	Sir John Townshend; Sir Richard Knightley	Sir John Townsend killed in duel with Sir Matthew Browne 1 Aug 1603
Eye	Edward Honing; Anthony Gawdy	
Aldeburgh	Martin Stutteville; Francis Corbet	
Sudbury	Philip Gawdy; Edward Glascock	
=== Surrey ===
Constituency	Members	Notes
Surrey	(Sir) George More; Lord Howard of Effingham	
Southwark	Zachariah Locke; Mathew Dale	
Bletchingly	John Turner; Bostock Fuller	
Reigate	Sir Edward Howard; Sir John Trevor	
Gatton	Sir Matthew Browne; Richard Sondes	Sir Matthew Browne killed in duel by Sir John Townsend 1 Aug 1603
Guildford	Sir Robert More; William Jackson	
Haslemere	Francis Wolley; John Clarke	
=== Sussex ===
Constituency	Members	Notes
Sussex	Robert Sackville; Charles Howard	
Chichester	Adrian Stoughton; Stephen Barnham	
Horsham	Sir William Hervey; Michael Hicks	
Midhurst	Richard Browne snr Michael Heydon	
Lewes	Goddard Pemberton; George Goring	Pemberton sat for Peterborough - replaced by Sir Percival Hart
New Shoreham	John Morley; Robert Booth	
Steyning	Sir Thomas Shirley; Robert Bowyer	
Bramber	Sir Thomas Shirley; Henry Bowyer	Shirley sat for Steyning - replaced by Henry Lok
East Grinstead	Sir Henry Compton; George Rivers	
Arundel	Thomas Palmer; Thomas Baker	
=== Warwickshire ===
Constituency	Members	Notes
Warwickshire	Fulke Greville; Sir Robert Digby	
Coventry	Henry Breres; Thomas Saunders	
Warwick	John Townsend; William Spicer	
=== Westmorland ===
Constituency	Members	Notes
Westmoreland	Sir Thomas Strickland; George Wharton	
Appleby	John Morice; Thomas Caesar	
=== Wiltshire ===
Constituency	Members	Notes
Wiltshire	Edmund Carey; Sir Edward Hungerford	
Salisbury	Giles Tooker; John Puxton	
Wilton	Sir Edmund Morgan; Hugh Sandford	
Downton	Thomas Penruddocke; Edward Baker	
Hindon	George Paule; Thomas Thynne	
Heytesbury	Sir John Thynne; Richard Smythe	
Chippenham	Robert Berkeley; Edward Wymarke	
Calne	Lionel Duckett (died 1609); Richard Lowe	
Devizes	Giles Fettiplace; Robert Drew	
Ludgershall	James Kirton; Robert Penruddocke	
Great Bedwyn	Levinus Monk; Sir Anthony Hungerford	
Cricklade	Sir George Gifford; Robert Master	
Malmesbury	Sidney Montagu; Sir William Monson	
Westbury	Matthew Ley; Henry Jackman	
Old Sarum	Henry Hyde; Robert Turner	
Wootton Bassett	John Wentworth; John Rice	
Marlborough	Lawrence Hyde; Richard Digges	
=== Worcestershire ===
Constituency	Members	Notes
Worcestershire	Thomas Leighton; Thomas Russell	
Worcester	Rowland Berkeley; Christopher Deighton	
Droitwich	John Buck; Humphrey Wheler	
=== Yorkshire ===
Constituency	Members	Notes
Yorkshire	Thomas Fairfax; Sir Edward Stanhope	
York	Sir John Bennet; Henry Hall	
Kingston upon Hull	John Lister; John Graves	
Scarborough	William Eure; Edward Stanhope	
Knaresborough	Sir Henry Slingsby; Sir William Slingsby	
Richmond	Sir Talbot Bowes; Cuthbert Pepper	
Beverley	Edward Fraunceys; Randolph Ewens	
Aldborough	Sir Edward Cecil; Richard Theakston	
Thirsk	Henry Belasyse; Sir John Mallory	
Hedon	Matthew Patteson; Sir Christopher Hilliard	
Ripon	John Thornborough; Christopher Perkins	
Boroughbridge	Richard Whalley; Thomas Fairfax	
=== Cinque Ports ===
Constituency	Members	Notes
Hastings	Sir Thomas Shirley jun. Richard Lyffe	
Sandwich	Peter Manwood; Edward Peake	
Dover	George Fane; George Newman	
Romney	Thomas Lake; John Mynge	
Hythe	William Knight; Christopher Toldervey	
Rye	Sir Arthur Gorges; Thomas Colepeper	
Winchelsea	Moyle Finch; Hugh Beeston	
=== Wales ===
Constituency	Members	Notes
Anglesey	Thomas Holland	
Beaumaris	William Maurice	
Brecknockshire	Sir Robert Knollys	
Brecknock	Henry Wiliams	
Carnarvon	Nicholas Griffith	
Carnarvonshire	William Jones	
Cardiganshire	Richard Pryse	
Cardigan	William Aubrey and Richard Delabere	Unresolved double return
Carmarthenshire	John Vaughan	
Carmarthen	Sir Walter Rice	
Denbighshire	Sir John Salusbury	
Denbigh Boroughs	John Panton	
Flintshire	William Ravenscroft	
Flint	John Price	
Glamorgan	Sir John Herbert	
Cardiff	William Lewis	
Merioneth	Robert Lloyd	
Montgomeryshire	Edward Herbert	
Montgomery	John Harris	
Pembrokeshire	Sir John Philipps	
Pembroke	John Lougher	
Haverford West	John Canon	
Radnorshire	James Price	
Radnor	Stephen Price	

== See also ==
- List of MPs elected to the English parliament in 1604
- The Golden Speech
