= List of MPs elected to the English parliament in 1604 =

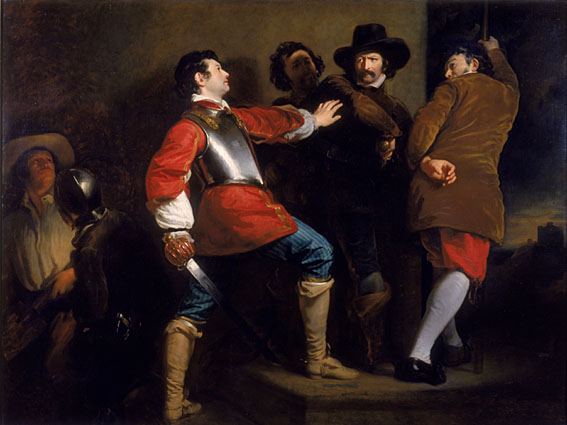
The Discovery of the Gunpowder Plot by Henry Perronet Briggs, 1823. Guy Fawkes discovered guarding barrels of gunpowder in the undercroft beneath the House of Lords shortly after midnight on 5 November 1605.

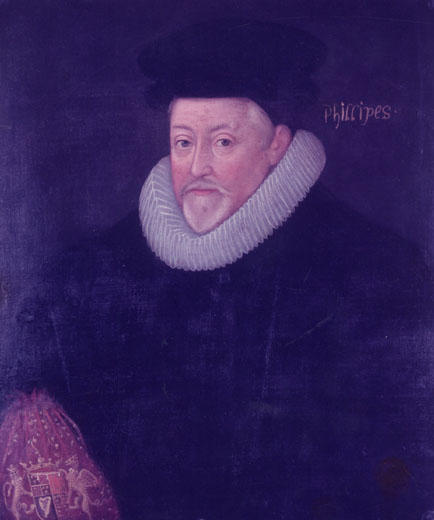
Sir Edward Phelips - Speaker

This is a list of members of Parliament (MPs) elected to the 1st parliament in the reign of King James I in 1604, known as the Blessed Parliament.

The Parliament was summoned on 31 January 1604 and the first session ran from 19 March 1604 to 7 July 1604. The second session began on 5 November 1605 on the day when the Gunpowder Plot was discovered. It ended on 27 May 1606. The third session began on 18 November 1606 and lasted to 5 July 1607. The fourth session began on 9 February 1609 and continued to 23 July 1610. It was prorogued to 16 October 1610 and continued to 21 December 1610. It was then prorogued to 9 February 1611 when it was dissolved.

Prior to 1621 there was no official list of members and the 1614 parliamentary list is incomplete. However Browne Willis was able to state that his record for 1604 "is rendered thus perfect from a List sent me by the late Sir Philip Sydenham Bart".

== List of constituencies and members ==
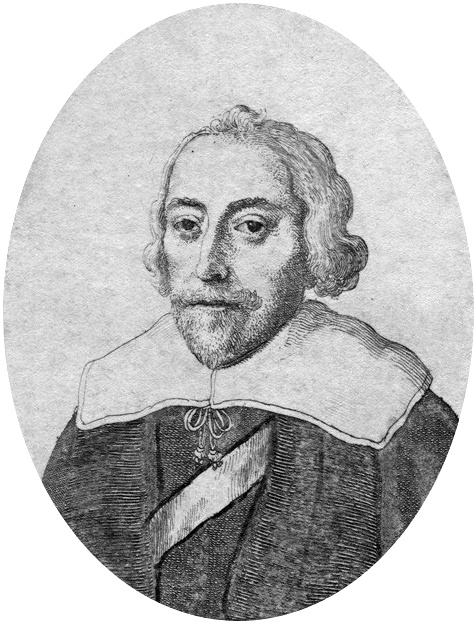
Oliver St John, Bedfordshire

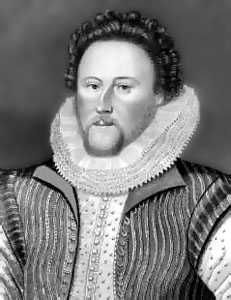
Sir Henry Neville, Berkshire

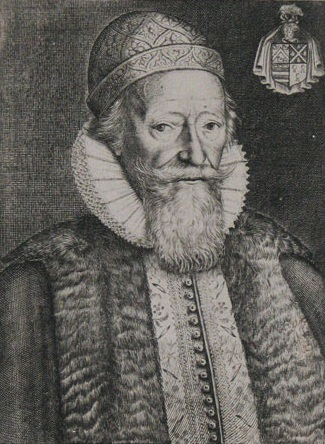
Sir William Wade, West Looe

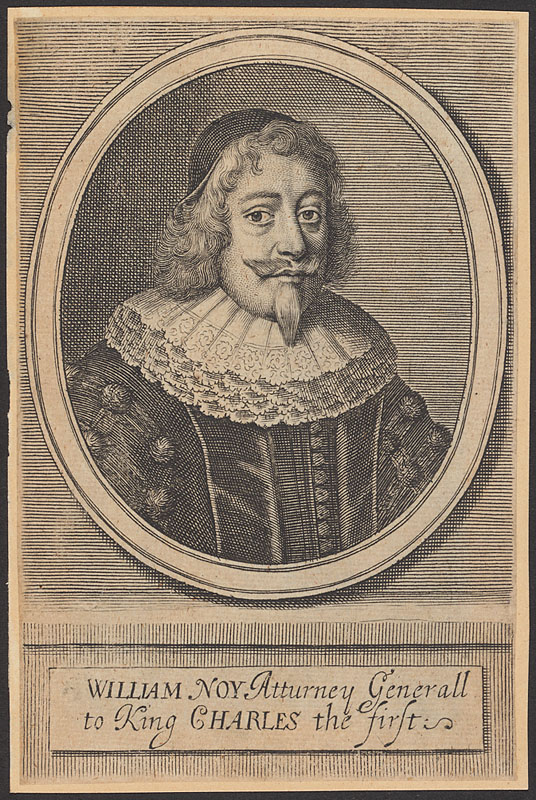
William Noy, Grampound

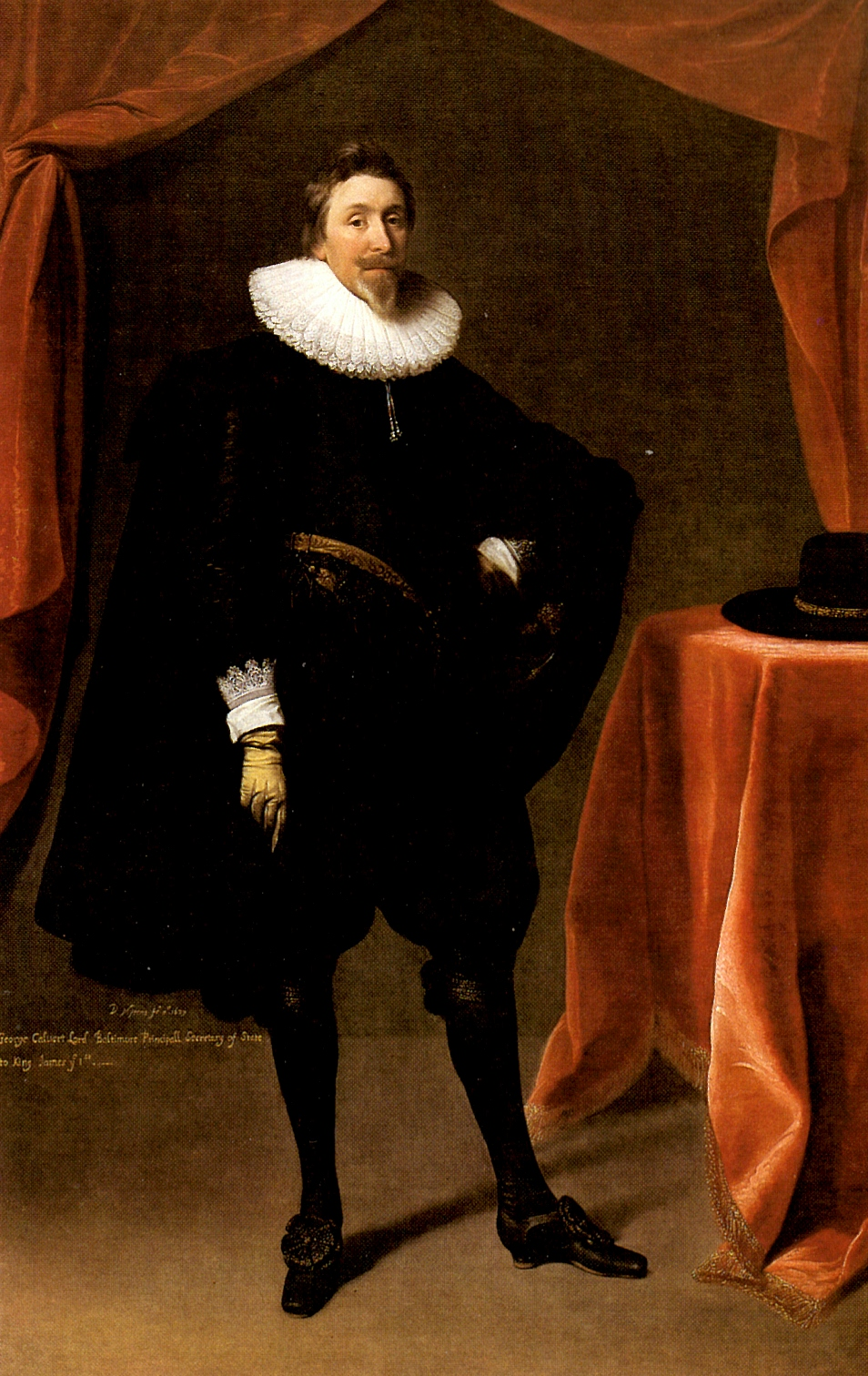
George Calvert, Bossiney 1609

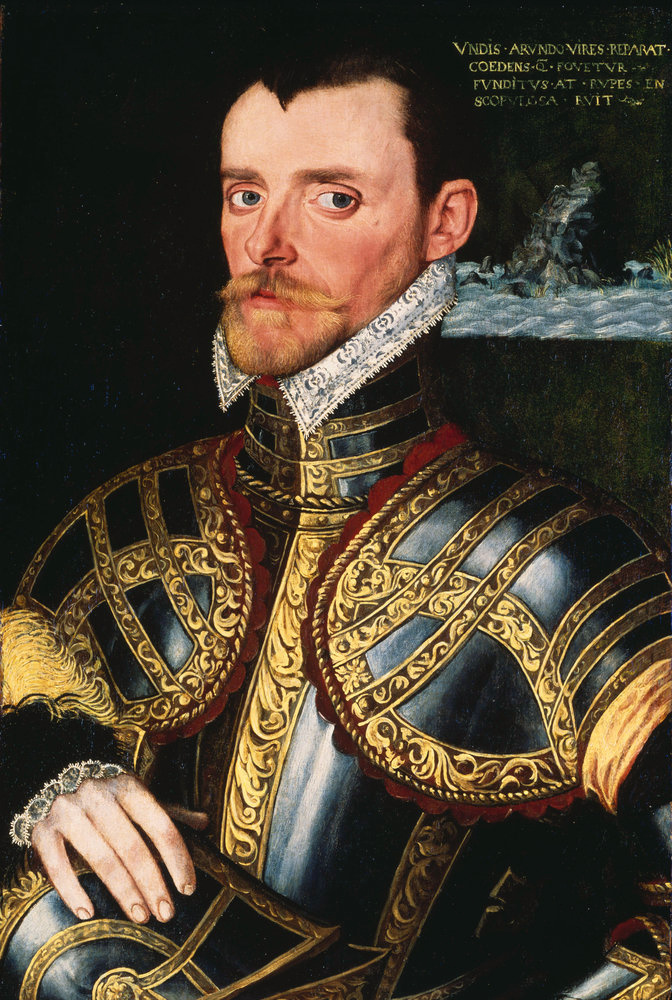
Sir Richard Hawkins, Plymouth

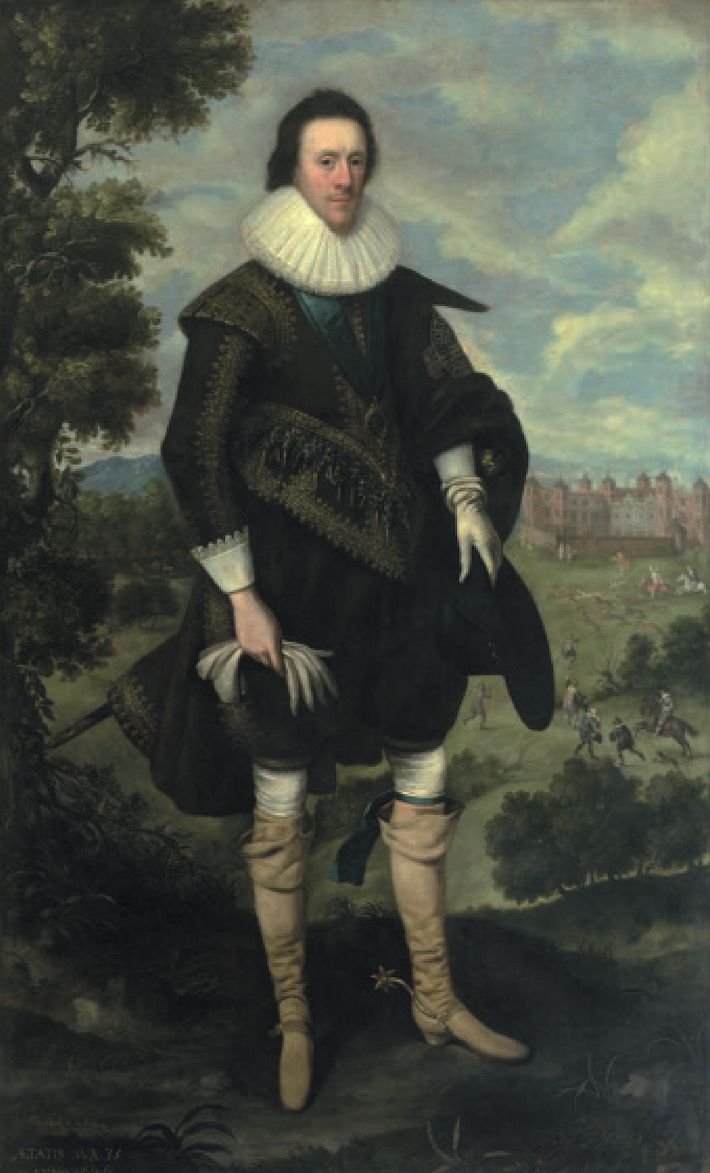
William Cecil, Weymouth

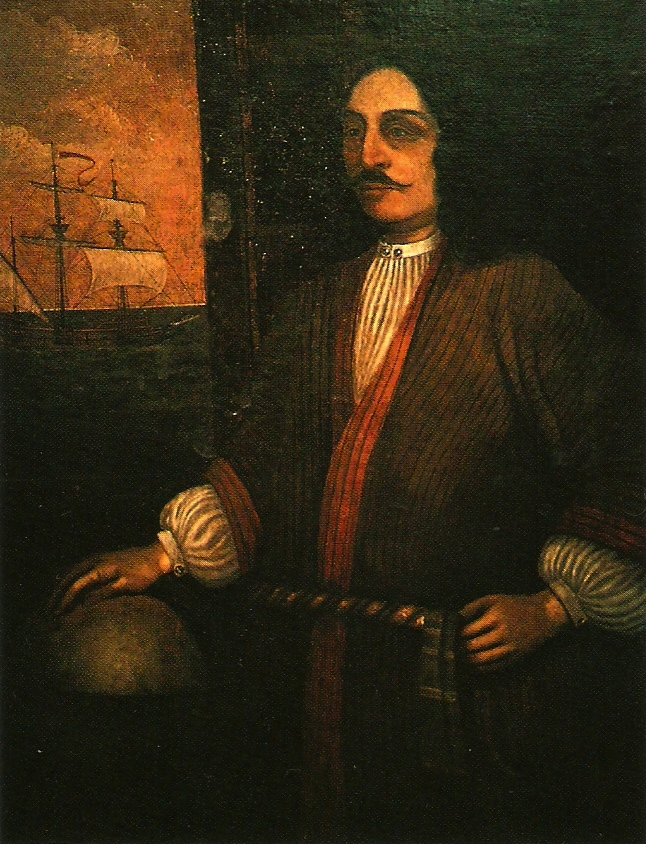
Sir George Somers, Lyme Regis

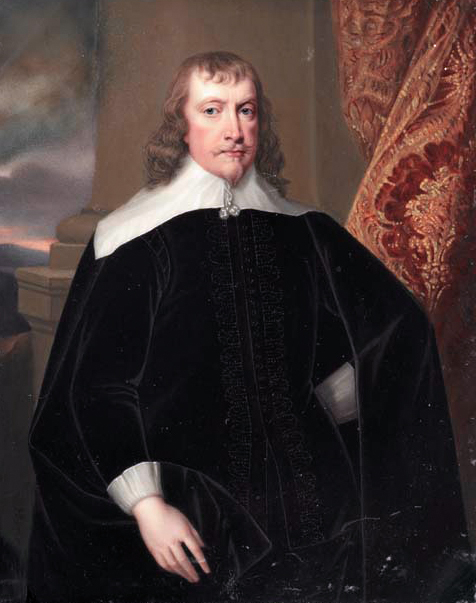
Francis Russell, Lyme Regis 1610

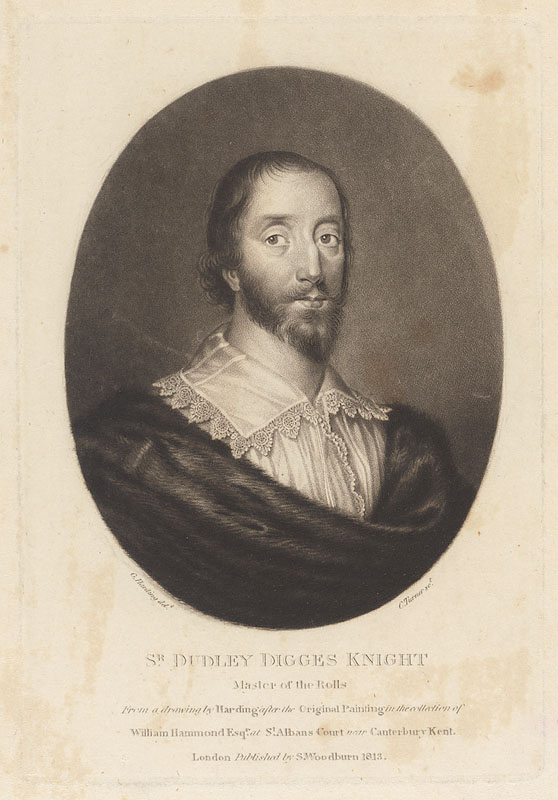
Sir Dudley Digges, Tewkesbury

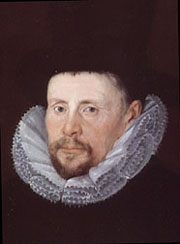
Thomas Fleming, Southampton

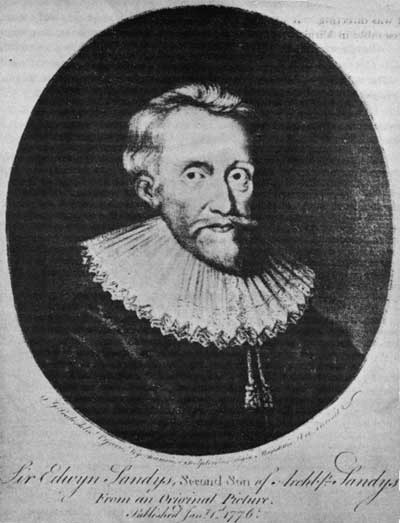
Sir Edwin Sandys, Stockbridge

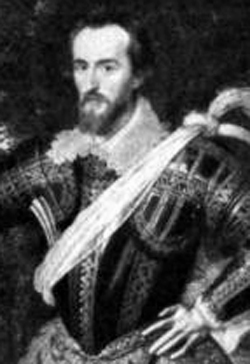
Sir James Scudamore, Herefordshire

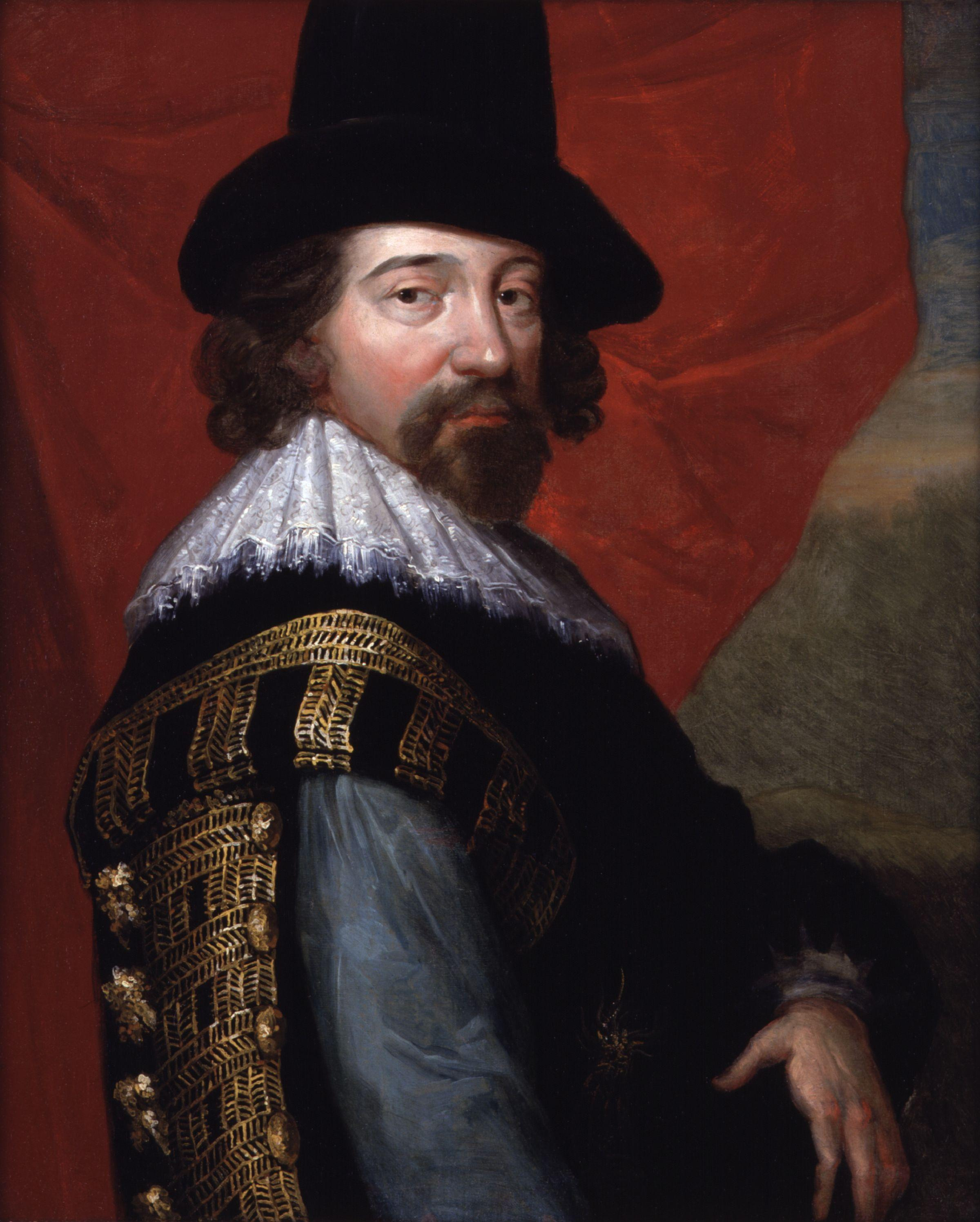
Francis Bacon, St Albans

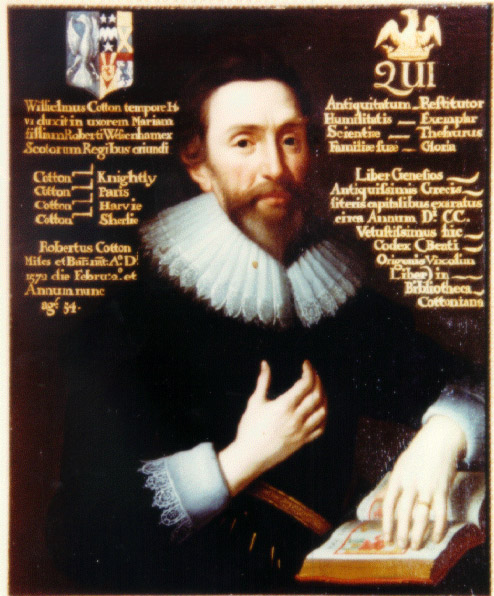
Sir Robert Cotton, Huntingdonshire

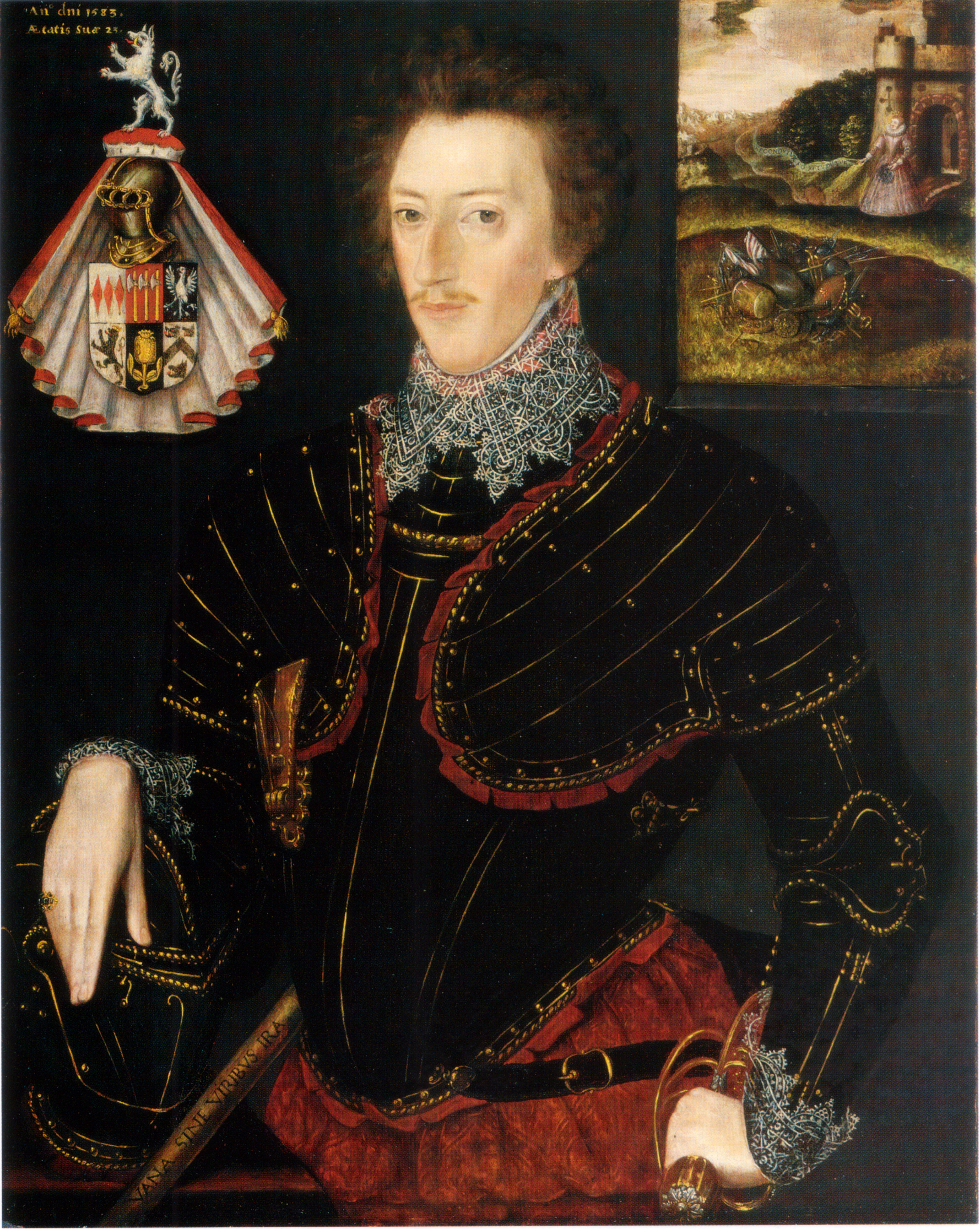
Sir Edward Hoby, Rochester

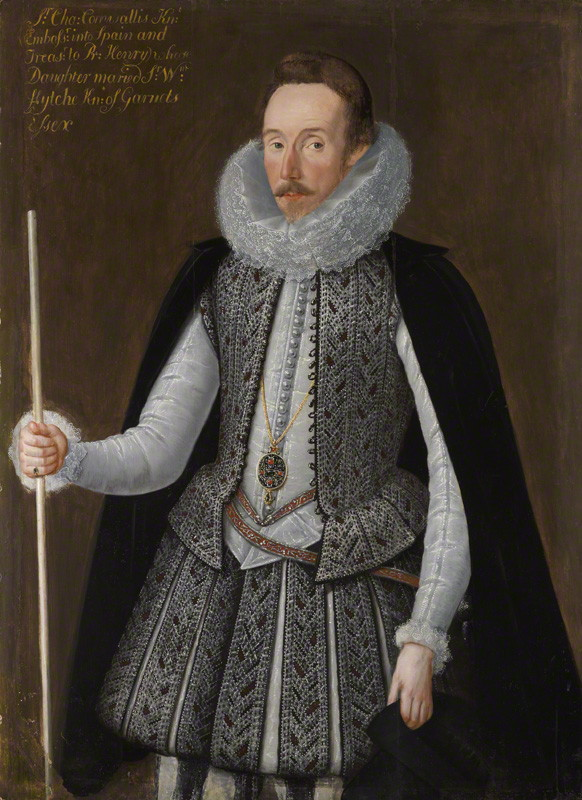
Sir Charles Cornwallis, Norfolk

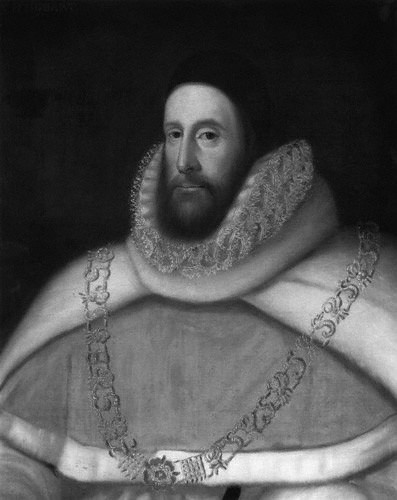
Henry Hobart, Norwich

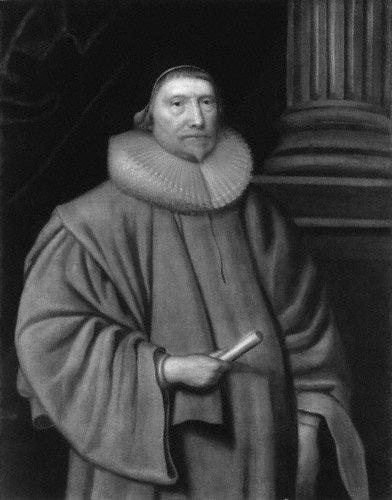
Robert Hitcham, King's Lynn

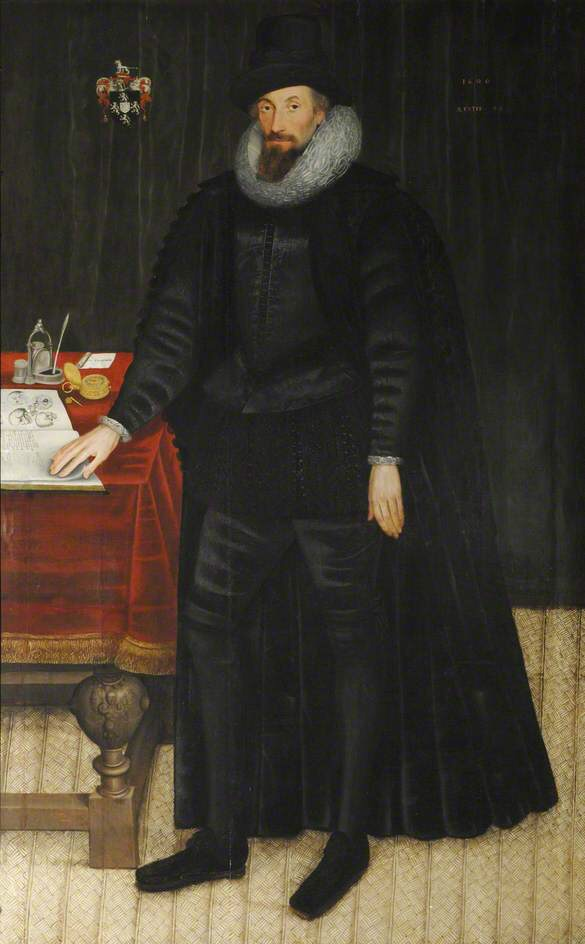
Sir William Paddy, Thetford

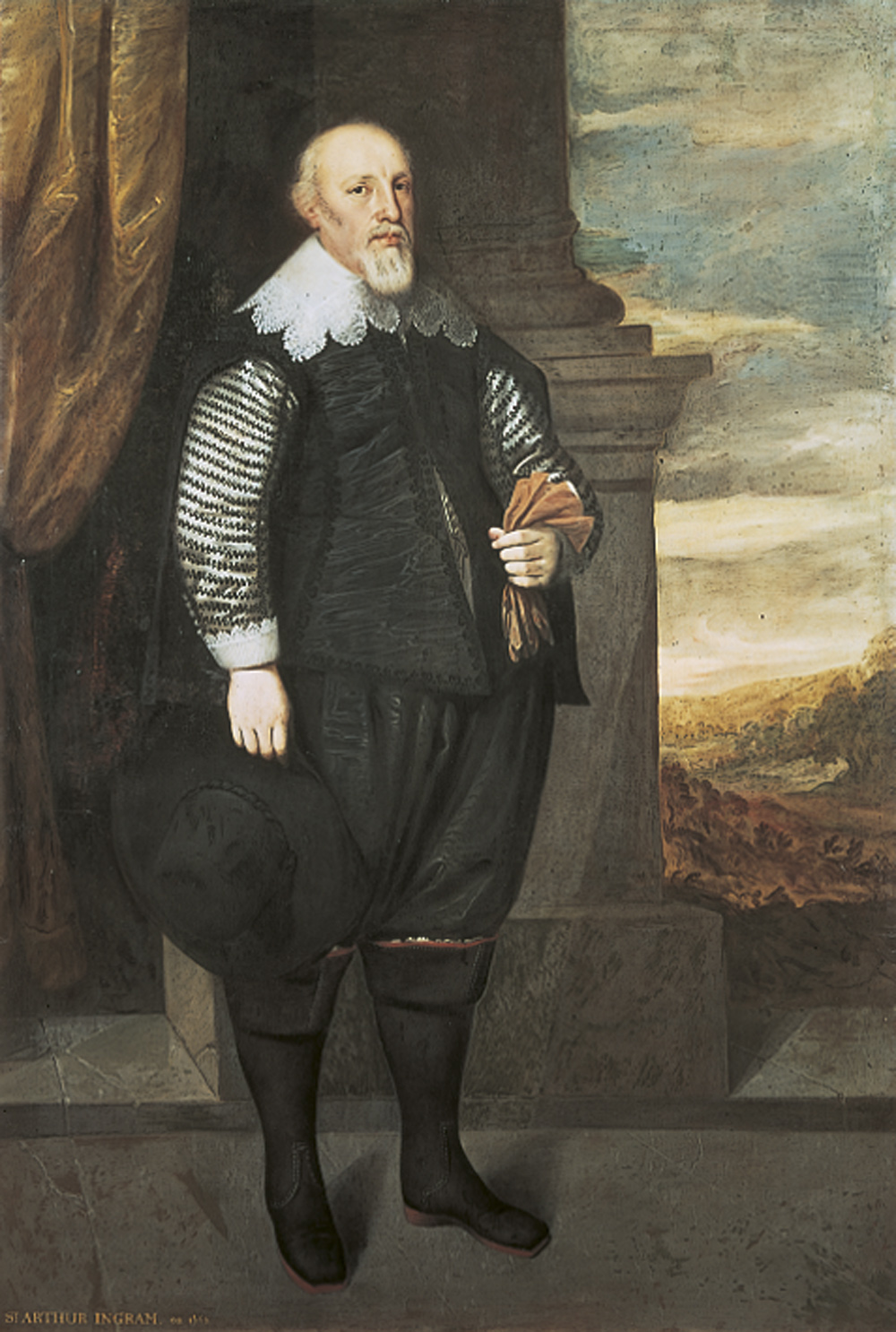
Arthur Ingram, Stafford 1609

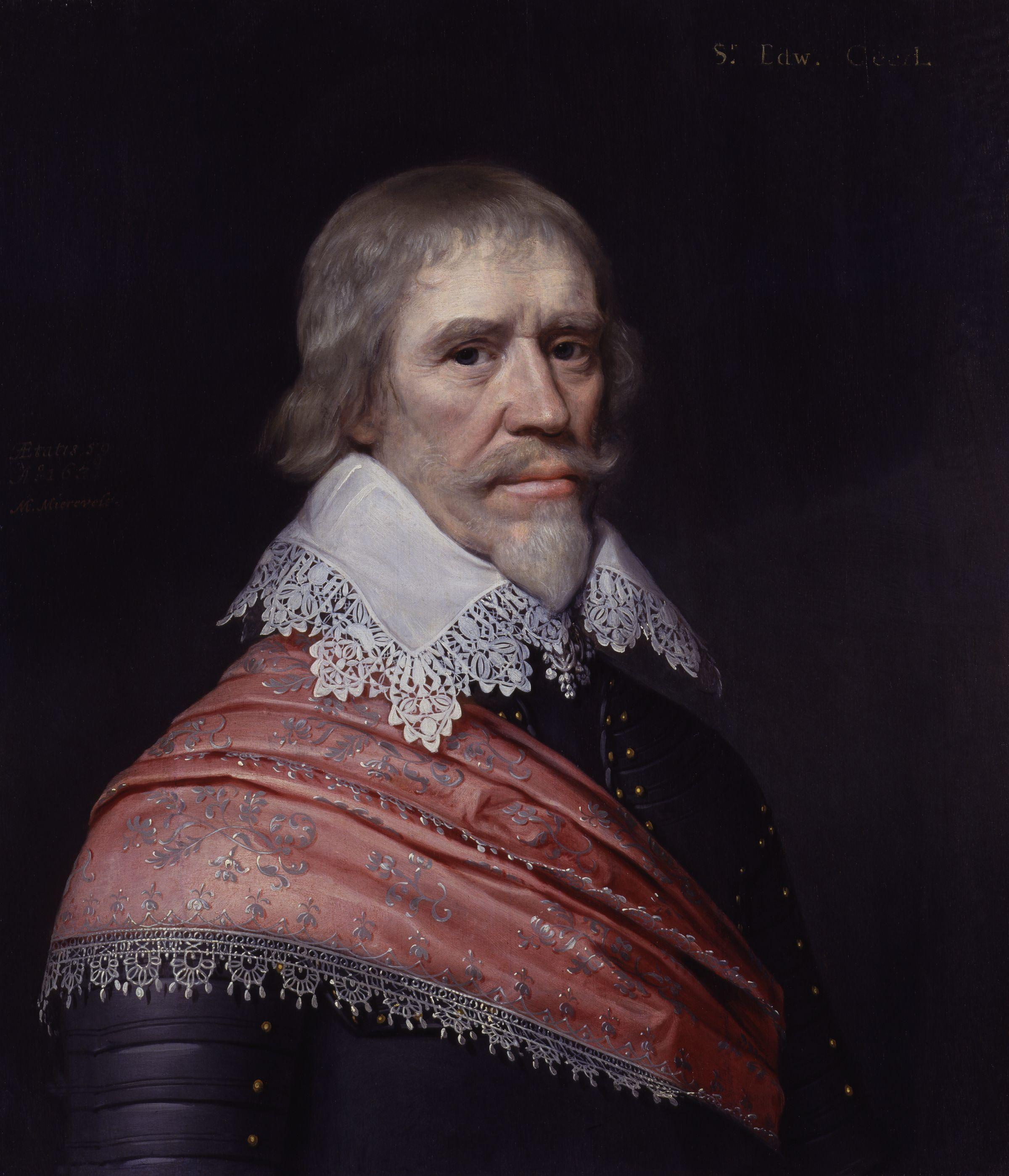
Edward Cecil, Chichester

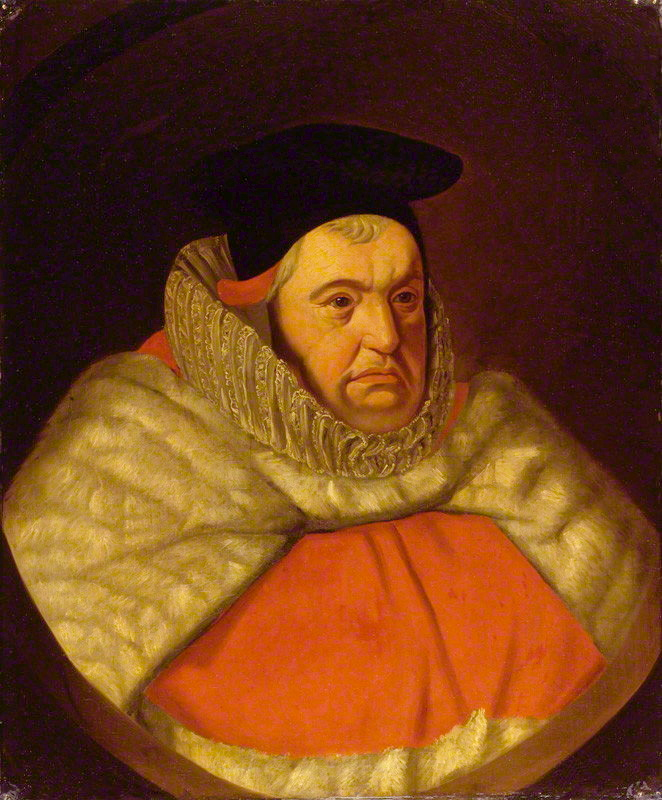
John Doddridge, Horsham

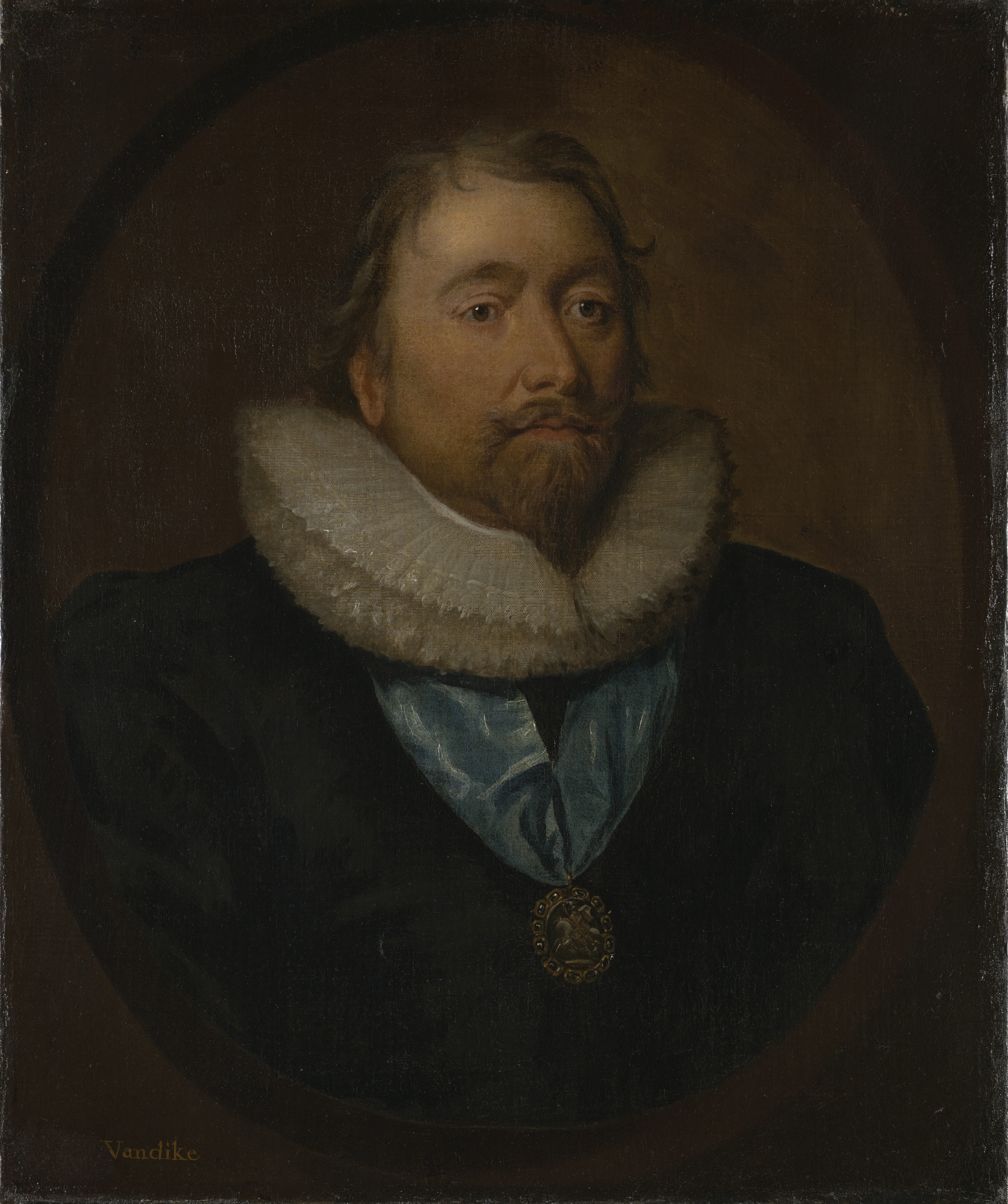
Sir Richard Weston, Midhurst

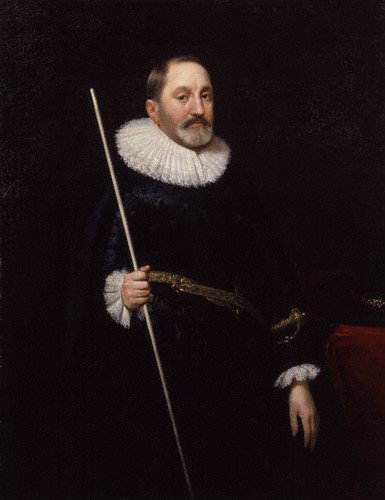
Sir Thomas Edmondes, Wilton

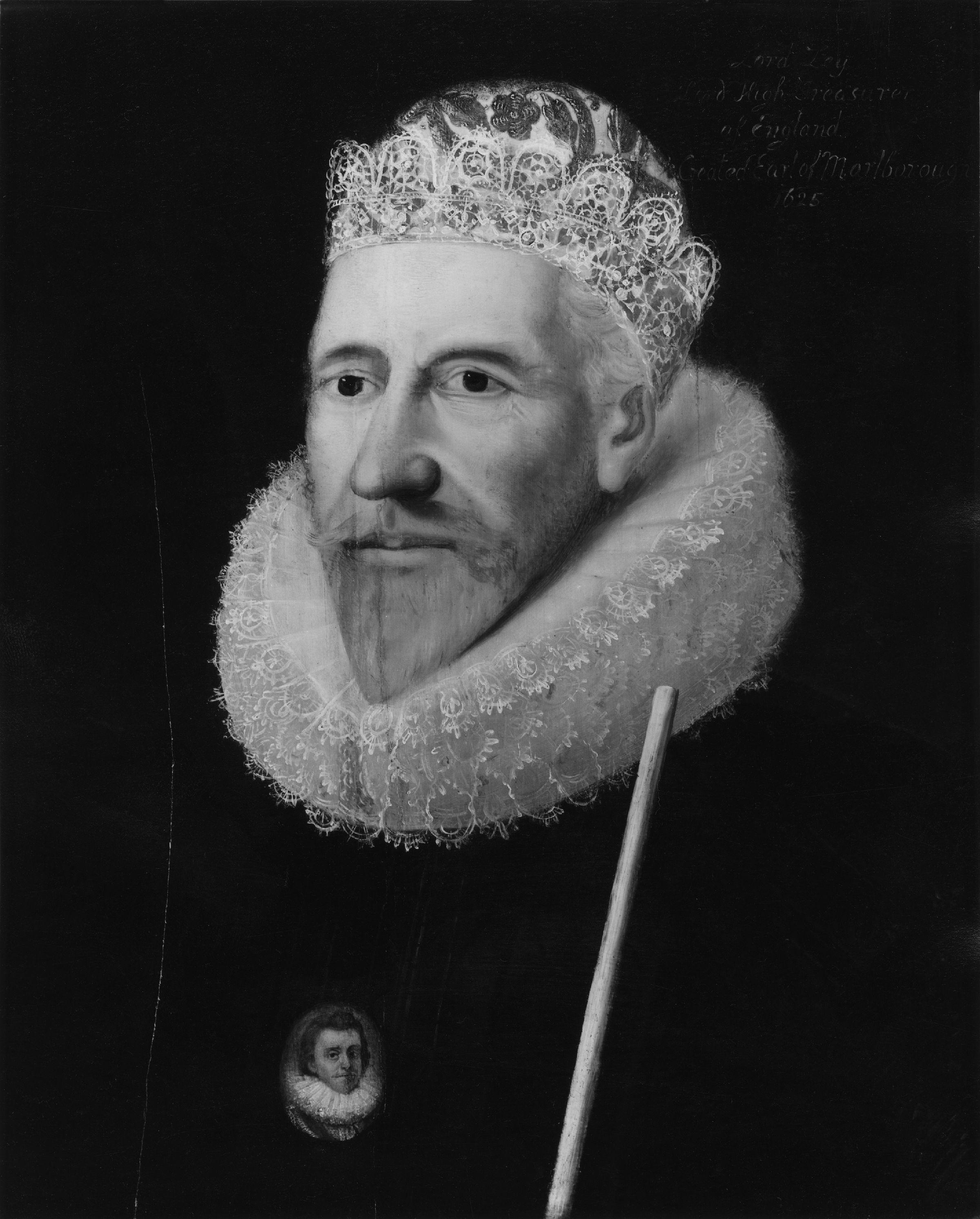
Sir James Ley, Westbury

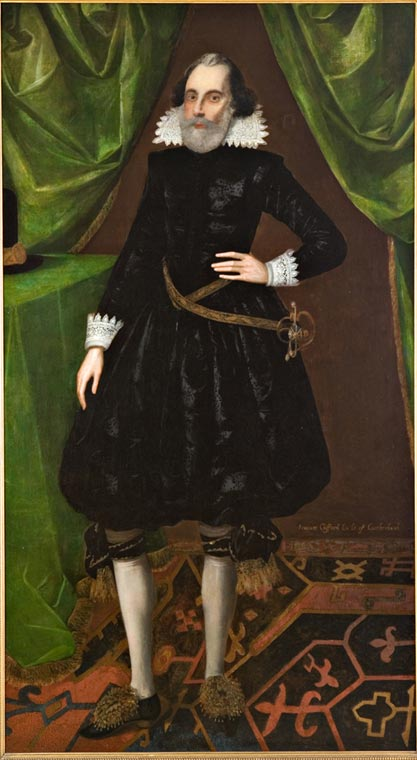
Sir Francis Clifford, Yorkshire

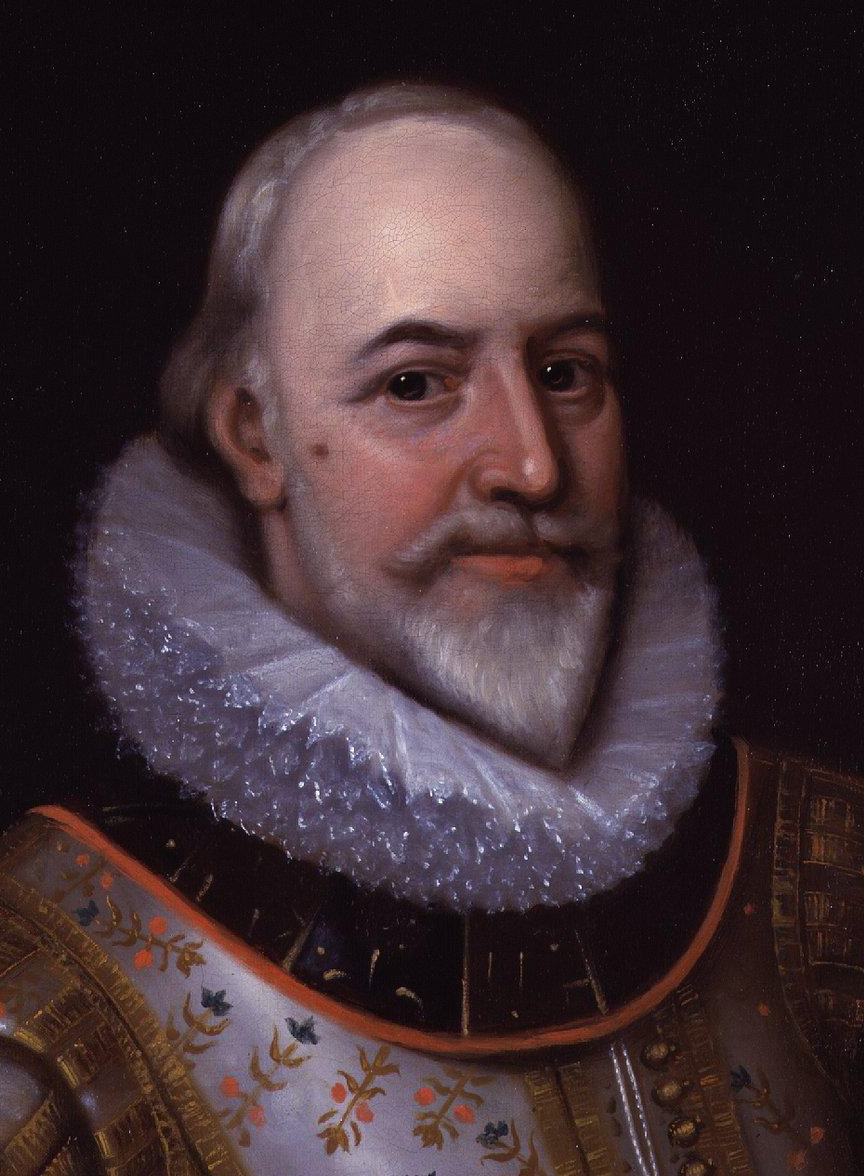
George Carew, Hasting

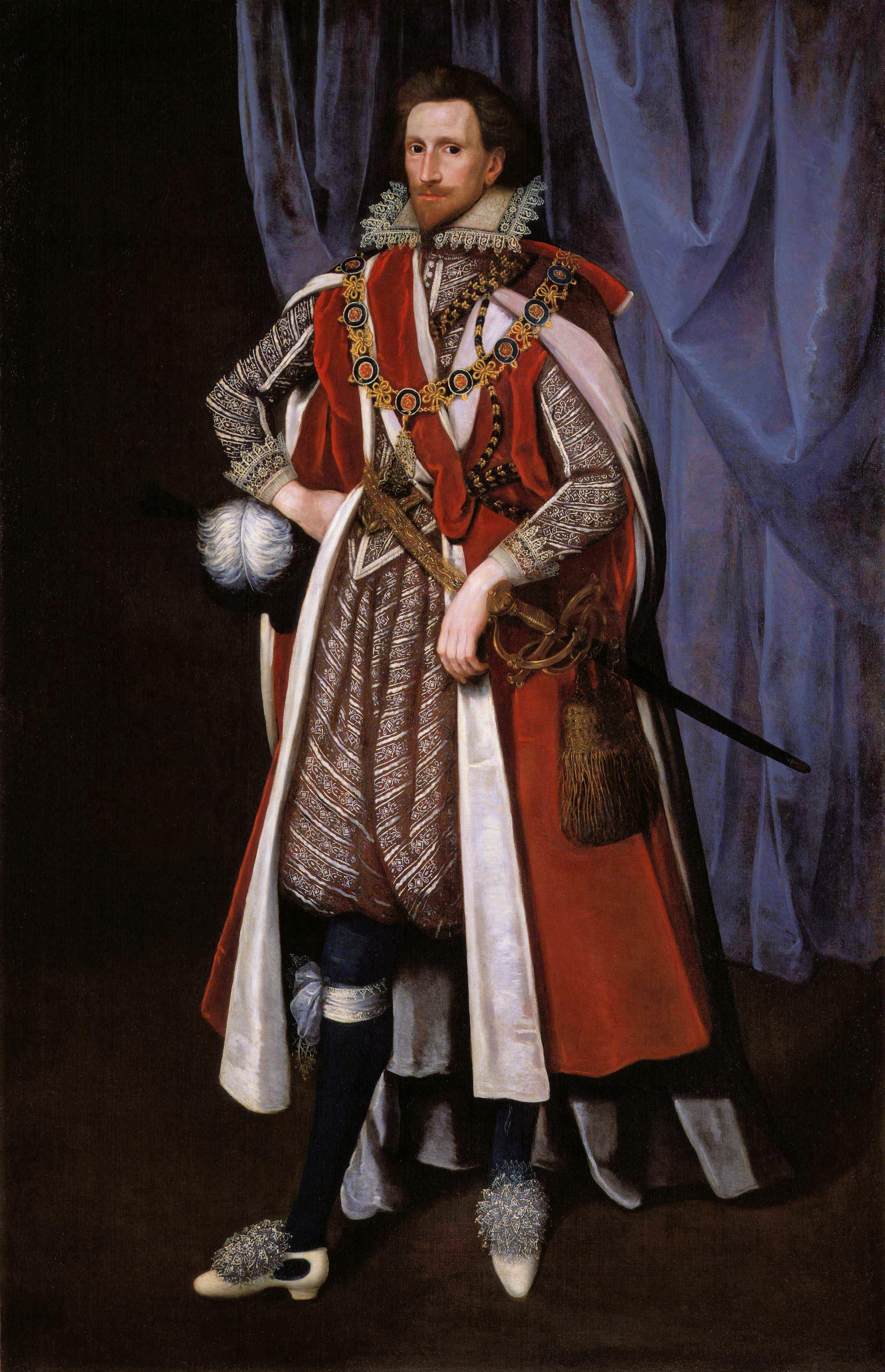
Philip Herbert, Glamorgan

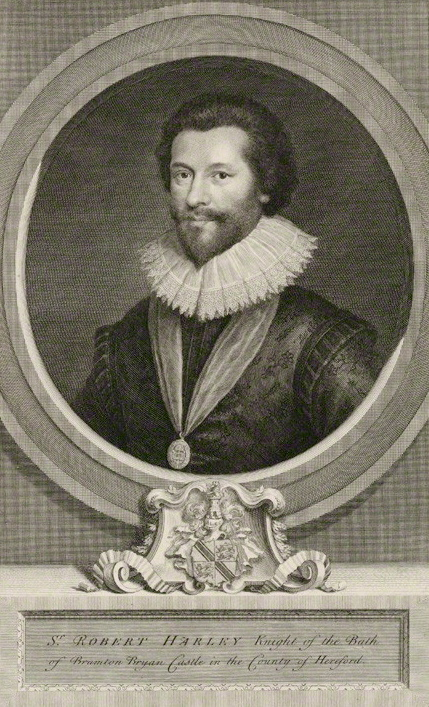
Sir Robert Harley, Radnor

=== Bedfordshire ===
Constituency	Members	Notes
Bedfordshire	Hon. Oliver St John; Sir Edward Radclyffe	
Bedford	Humphrey Winche; Thomas Hawes	Winche replaced by Sir Christopher Hatton
=== Berkshire ===
Constituency	Members	Notes
Berkshire	Sir Henry Neville; Sir Francis Knollys	
Windsor	Samuel Backhouse; Thomas Durdent	Durdent died - replaced by Sir Francis Howard
Reading	Francis Moore; Jerome Bowes	
Wallingford	Sir William Dunch; Griffin Payne	
Abingdon	Sir Richard Lovelace	
=== Buckinghamshire ===
Constituency	Members	Notes
Buckinghamshire	Sir Francis Goodwin; William Fleetwood	Goodwin not duly elected and replaced by Christopher Pigott. Pigott expelled, replaced by Sir Anthony Tyringham
Buckingham	Sir Thomas Denton; Sir Edward Tyrrell	Tyrrell died - replaced by Sir Francis Goodwin
Wycombe	Sir John Townsend; Henry Fleetwood	
Aylesbury	Sir William Borlase; Sir William Smith	
=== Cambridgeshire ===
Constituency	Members	Notes
Cambridgeshire	Sir John Peyton, 1st Baronet; Sir John Cutts	
Cambridge University	Nicholas Steward; Henry Mountlow	Steward replaced by Barnaby Gooch
Cambridge	Robert Wallis; John Yaxley	
=== Cheshire ===
Constituency	Members	Notes
Cheshire	Sir Thomas Holcroft; Sir Roger Aston	
City of Chester	Thomas Lawton; Hugh Glasier	
=== Cornwall ===
Constituency	Members	Notes
Cornwall	Sir Anthony Rous; Sir Jonathan Trelawny	Trelawny died 1604 replaced by Sir William Godolphin
Launceston	Sir Thomas Lake; Ambrose Rous	
Liskeard	Sir William Killigrew; Reginald Nicholas	
Lostwithiel	Sir Thomas Chaloner; Sir William Lower	
Truro	Henry Cossen; Sir Thomas Burgess	
Bodmin	John Stone; Richard Spray	
Helston	Sir John Leigh; John Bogans	Bogans died (1606); replaced by Robert Naunton
Saltash	Sir Peter Manwood; Thomas Wyvill	
Westlow	Sir George Harvey; Sir Henry Goodyer	Harvey died; replaced by Sir William Wade
Grampound	William Noy; Francis Barnham	
Eastlow	Sir Robert Phelips; Sir John Parker	
Camelford	John Good; Anthony Turpin	
Penryn	Sir Richard Warburton; Thomas Prowse	Warburton died; replaced by Sir William Maynard (1609-1611); Prowse died; replaced by Sir Edward Conway (1610-1611)
Tregoney	Henry Pomeroy; Richard Garveigh	
St Ives	John Tregannon; William Brook	
Mitchell	William Cary; William Hakewill	
Bossiney	George Upton; Jerome Horsey	Upton died; replaced 1609-1611 by George Calvert
Fowey	Henry Peter; Francis Vyvyan	
St Germans	George Carew; John Trott	
St Mawes	Dudley Carleton; Sir John Speccot	
Newport	Sir Robert Killigrew; Sir Edward Seymour, 2nd Baronet	
Callington	Sir Roger Wilbraham; Sir Wiliam Rolle	
=== Cumberland ===
Constituency	Members	Notes
Cumberland	Wilfrid Lawson; Edward Musgrave	
Carlisle	Thomas Blennerhassett; William Barwick	
=== Derbyshire ===
Constituency	Members	Notes
Derbyshire	William Kniveton; Sir John Harpur	
Derby	John Baxter; Edmund Sleighe	
=== Devon ===
Constituency	Members	Notes
Devon	Edward Seymour; Thomas Ridgeway	Ridgway replaced 1607 by Sir John Acland
Exeter	John Prowse; George Smith	
Totnes	Christopher Brocking; Walter Dollings (merchant)	
Barnstaple	Thomas Hinson; George Pearde	
Plymouth	Sir Richard Hawkins; James Bagg (merchant)	
Plympton Erle	Sir William Strode; Sir Henry Beaumont	Beaumont chose for Leicester - replaced by John Hele
Tavistock	Sir George Fleetwood; Edward Duncombe	
Bere Alston	Sir Arthur Atye; Sir Richard Strode	Atye died replaced by Humphrey May from 1605
Clifton Dartmouth Hardness	Thomas Holland; Thomas Gurney	
=== Dorset ===
Constituency	Members	Notes
Dorset	Sir Thomas Freke; John Williams	
Dorchester	Matthew Chubbe; John Spicer	
Poole	Edward Man; Thomas Robarts	
Shaftesbury	Robert Hopton; John Budden	
Weymouth	Thomas Barfoot (mayor); Sir John Hanham	Barfoot died - replaced by William Cecil, Lord Cranborne
Melcombe Regis	Robert White (alderman); Robert Myddelton (merchant)	White replaced 1610 by Barnard Michell
Lyme Regis	Sir George Somers; John Hassard	Somers died 1610 - replaced by Sir Francis Russell; Hassard too ill in 1610 - replaced by George Jeffreys
Wareham	Sir Robert Napier; Francis James	
Bridport	Robert Meller; John Pitt	
Corfe Castle	Sir John Hobart; Edward Duncombe	Duncombe poss Daccombe
=== Essex ===
Constituency	Members	Notes
Essex	Sir Edward Denny; Sir Francis Barrington Bt	Denny ennobled and replaced 1605 by Sir Gameliel Capell
Colchester	Robert Barker; Edward Alford	
Maldon	Sir Edward Lewknor; William Wiseman	Lewknor died - replaced by Sir Theophilus Howard; Wiseman died - replaced by Sir John Sammes
Harwich	Richard Browne; Thomas Trevor	Not recorded by BW
=== Gloucestershire ===
Constituency	Members	Notes
Gloucestershire	Sir Thomas Berkeley; Sir Richard Berkeley	Richard Berkeley died - replaced by John Throckmorton
Gloucester	Nicholas Overbury; John Jones	BW gives Christopher Caple
Cirencester	Richard Martin; Arnold Oldsworth	Martin chose for Christchurch - replaced by Edward Jones; Jones died - replaced by Sir Anthony Manie
Tewkesbury		Not enfranchised until 1610 when Sir Dudley Diggs and Edward Ferrers returned
=== Hampshire ===
Constituency	Members	Notes
Hampshire	Sir Robert Oxenbridge; William Jephson	
Winchester	John Moore; Edward Cole	
Southampton	Thomas Fleming; Sir John Jeffrys	Thomas Fleming made Baron of the Exchequer in 1604. Replaced by son Thomas Fleming
Portsmouth	Oliver St John; Sir Richard Jenvoy	
Petersfield	Sir William Hervey; Sir William Kingswell	
Yarmouth, Isle of Wight	Thomas Cheeke; Arthur Bromfield	
Newport, Isle of Wight	Richard James; John Ashdell	
Newtown, Isle of Wight	Sir John Stanhope; William Meux	Stanhope made Baron in 1605 and replaced by Thomas Wilson
Lymington	Thomas Marshal; Thomas South	
Christchurch	Richard Martin; Nicholas Hyde	
Stockbridge	Sir William Fortescue; Edwin Sandys	
Whitchurch	Sir Richard Pawlett; Thomas Brookes	
Andover	Sir Thomas Jermyn; Thomas Antrobus	
=== Herefordshire ===
Constituency	Members	Notes
Herefordshire	Sir James Scudamore; Sir Herbert Croft	
Hereford	Walter Hardman; John Hoskins	
Leominster	Thomas Coningsby; John Powle	
=== Hertfordshire ===
Constituency	Members	Notes
Hertfordshire	Henry Cary, 1st Viscount Falkland; Sir Rowland Lytton	
St Albans	Francis Bacon; Adolph Carey	Bacon chosen for Ipswich replaced by Tobie Matthew; Carey died - replaced by Sir Thomas Parry
Hertford		Not enfranchised
=== Huntingdonshire ===
Constituency	Members	Notes
Huntingdonshire	Sir Robert Cotton, 1st Baronet, of Connington; Sir Oliver Cromwell	
Huntingdon	Henry Cromwell; Thomas Harley	
=== Kent ===
Constituency	Members	Notes
Kent	Sir John Scott; Sir John Leveson	
Canterbury	John Boys; Matthew Hadde	
Rochester	Sir Edward Hoby (Sir) Thomas Walsingham (elder)	
Queenborough	Sir Edward Stafford; Michael Sondes	
Maidstone	Sir Francis Fane; Lawrence Washington	
=== Lancashire ===
Constituency	Members	Notes
Lancashire	Sir Richard Molyneux; Sir Richard Hoghton	
Preston	Sir Vincent Skinner; William Holte (or Hall)	
Lancaster	Sir Thomas Hesketh; Sir Thomas Fanshawe	Hesketh replaced 1605 by Thomas Howard
Newton	Sir John Luke; Richard Ashton	
Wigan	Sir William Cooke; Sir John Pulteney	
Clitheroe	Sir John Dormer; Martin Lister	
Liverpool	Giles Brook (alderman); Thomas Remchinge	
=== Leicestershire ===
Constituency	Members	Notes
Leicestershire	Sir George Villiers; Sir Thomas Beaumont	
Leicester	William Skipwith; Henry Beaumont	Skipwith died 1610 and replaced by Henry Rich
=== Lincolnshire ===
Constituency	Members	Notes
Lincolnshire	Lord Clinton and Saye; John Sheffield	
Lincoln	Sir Thomas Grantham; Sir Edward Tyrwhit	
Boston	Anthony Irby; Francis Bullingham	
Grimsby	Sir William Wray; Sir George St Paul	
Stamford	Sir Robert Wingfield; Henry Hall	Wingfield died 1609 - replaced by Edward Cecil
Grantham	Sir George Manners; Sir Thomas Horsman	
=== Middlesex ===
Constituency	Members	Notes
Middlesex	Sir Robert Wroth; Sir William Fleetwood	Julius Caesar served part term.
Westminster	Sir Thomas Knyvet; Sir Walter Cope	
City of London	Sir Henry Billingsley; Sir Henry Montague; Nicholas Fuller; Richard Gore	Billingsley died 1606 - replaced by Sir Thomas Lowe
=== Monmouthshire ===
Constituency	Members	Notes
Monmouthshire	Thomas Somerset; Sir John Herbert	
Monmouth Boroughs	(Sir) Robert Johnson	
=== Norfolk ===
Constituency	Members	Notes
Norfolk	Nicholas Bacon; Sir Charles Cornwallis	
Norwich	Henry Hobart; John Pettus	
King's Lynn	Thomas Oxborough (recorder); Robert Hitcham	
Yarmouth	Thomas Damet; John Wheeler	
Thetford	Bassingbourne Gawdy; Sir William Paddy	Gawdy died in 1606 - replaced by Sir William Twysden
Castle Rising	Sir Thomas Monson; Sir Robert Townsend	
=== Northamptonshire ===
Constituency	Members	Notes
Northamptonshire	Sir Edward Montagu; Sir Valentine Knightley	
Peterborough	Richard Cecil; Edward Wymarke	
Northampton	Henry Yelverton; Edward Mercer	
Brackley	Richard Spencer; William Lisle	
Higham Ferrers	Goddard Pemberton	
=== Northumberland ===
Constituency	Members	Notes
Northumberland	Sir Ralph Grey; Sir Henry Widdrington	
Newcastle	George Selby; Henry Chapman	
Morpeth	Christopher Perkins; John Hare	
Berwick upon Tweed	Sir William Selby; Christopher Parkinson	
=== Nottinghamshire ===
Constituency	Members	Notes
Nottinghamshire	Sir John Holles; Sir Percival Willoughby	
Nottingham	Richard Hunt; Anchor Jackson	
East Retford	Sir John Thornhagh; Sir Thomas Darrel	
=== Oxfordshire ===
Constituency	Members	Notes
Oxfordshire	Lawrence Tanfield; John Doyley	
Oxford University	Sir Daniel Donne; Sir Thomas Crompton	
Oxford	Sir Francis Leigh; Thomas Wentworth	
Woodstock	Sir Richard Lee; Thomas Spencer	
Banbury	William Cope	
=== Rutland ===
Constituency	Members	Notes
Rutland	Sir James Harrington; Sir William Bulstrode	
=== Salop ===
Constituency	Members	Notes
Shropshire	Sir Richard Leveson; Sir Robert Needham	
Shrewsbury	Richard Barker; Francis Tate	
Bridgnorth	Sir Lewis Lewknor; Edward Bromley	Bromley replaced by Francis Lacon
Ludlow	Robert Berry; Richard Benson	
Wenlock	Robert Lawley; George Lawley	
Bishops Castle	William Twyneho; Samuel Lewknor	
=== Somerset ===
Constituency	Members	Notes
Somerset	Sir Francis Hastings (Sir) Edward Phelips	Phelips was speaker. Hastings died 1610 - replaced by John Poulett
Bristol	George Snigge; Thomas James	Snigge replaced in 1605 by John Whitson
Bath	William Sharestone; Christopher Stone	
Wells	Sir Robert Stapleton; James Kirton	Stapleton died 1606 - replaced by Edward Forsett
Taunton	Edward Hexte; John Bond	
Bridgwater	Sir Nicholas Halswell; John Povey	
Minehead	Sir Ambrose Turville; Sir Maurice Berkeley	
=== Staffordshire ===
Constituency	Members	Notes
Staffordshire	Sir Edward Littleton; Sir Robert Stanford	Littleton replaced 1610 by Francis Trentham; Stanford replaced 1607 by Sir John Egerton
Lichfield	Anthony Dyott; Thomas Crew	
Stafford	Hugh Beeston; George Cradock	Beeston replaced by Arthur Ingram in 1609
Newcastle under Lyme	Walter Chetwynd; John Bowyer	Bowyer died 1605 replaced in by-election by Rowland Cotton
Tamworth	Percival Willoughby; John Ferrers	Percival replaced in by-election in 1604 by Sir Thomas Beaumont
=== Suffolk ===
Constituency	Members	Notes
Suffolk	Sir John Heigham; Sir Robert Drury	
Ipswich	Sir Henry Glemham; Sir Francis Bacon	
Dunwich	Sir Valentine Knightley; Philip Gawdy	Knightley chose to sit for Northamptonshire;replaced by Thomas Smythe
Orford	Sir Michael Stanhope; Sir William Cornwallis	
Eye	Edward Honing; Sir Henry Bockenham	Honing died and replaced 1610 by Sir John Kay
Aldeburgh	Sir William Woodhouse; Thomas Revett	
Sudbury	Sir Thomas Beckingham; Thomas Eden	BW corregenda changes Eden from Henry to Thomas
=== Surrey ===
Constituency	Members	Notes
Surrey	Sir Robert More; Sir Edmund Bowyer	
Southwark	George Rivers; William Counden	
Bletchingly	Sir John Trevor; Richard Bellingham	Bellingham died, replaced by Sir Charles Howard
Reigate	Sir Edward Howard; Herbert Pelham	
Gatton	Sir Thomas Gresham; Sir Nicholas Saunders	
Guildford	Sir George More; George Austen	
Haslemere	Edward Fraunceys; William Jackson	
=== Sussex ===
Constituency	Members	Notes
Sussex	Robert Sackville; Charles Howard	
Chichester	Adrian Stoughton; Sir John Morley	
Horsham	John Dodderidge; Michael Hicks	.
Midhurst	Francis Neville; Sir Richard Weston	Weston may have replaced William Twinehoe
Lewes	John Shirley; Sir Henry Nevill	
New Shoreham	Sir Bernard Whetston; Sir Hugh Beeston	
Steyning	Sir Thomas Shirley; Sir Thomas Bishopp, 1st Baronet	
Bramber	Sir John Shurley; Henry Shelley	
East Grinstead	Sir Henry Compton; Sir John Swynnerton	
Arundel	Thomas Preston; John Tye	
=== Warwickshire ===
Constituency	Members	Notes
Warwickshire	Sir Edward Greville; Sir Richard Verney	
Coventry	Henry Breres; John Rogerson	Rogerson ill and replaced by Sir John Harington
Warwick	John Townsend; William Spicer	
=== Westmorland ===
Constituency	Members	Notes
Westmoreland	Sir Thomas Strickland; Sir Richard Musgrave	
Appleby	Sir John Morice; Sir William Bowyer	
=== Wiltshire ===
Constituency	Members	Notes
Wiltshire	Sir Francis Popham; Sir John Thynne	
Salisbury	Giles Tooker; Richard Godfrey	
Wilton	Sir Thomas Edmondes; Hugh Sandford	
Downton	Sir Carew Raleigh; William Stockman	
Hindon	Sir Edmund Ludlow; Thomas Thynne	
Heytesbury	Sir William Eyre; Walter Gawen	
Chippenham	John Hungerford; General John Roberts	
Calne	William Swaddon; John Noyes	Swaddon vacated seat - replaced by Sir Edmund Carey
Devizes	Sir Henry Baynton; Robert Drew	
Ludgershall	James Kirton; Henry Ludlow	
Great Bedwyn	John Rodney (Sir) Anthony Hungerford	
Cricklade	Sir John Hungerford; Sir Henry Poole	
Malmesbury	Sir Roger Dalyson; Sir Thomas Dalyson	
Westbury	Sir James Ley; Matthew Ley	James Ley made justice - replaced by Alexander Chocke
Old Sarum	William Ravenscroft; Edward Leache	
Wootton Bassett	Henry Martin; Alexander Tutt	
Marlborough	Lawrence Hyde; Richard Digges	
=== Worcestershire ===
Constituency	Members	Notes
Worcestershire	Sir Henry Bromley; Sir William Lygon	Lygon died 1609 - replaced by Sir Samuel Sandys
Worcester	John Coucher; Christopher Deighton	Deighton died - replaced by Rowland Berkeley
Droitwich	George Wylde I John Brace	
Evesham	Sir Thomas Biggs; Sir Philip Knightley	Knightley died 1605 - replaced by Robert Bowyer; Bowyer replaced 1610 by Edward Salter
Bewdley		Enfranchised 1605 Richard Young
=== Yorkshire ===
Constituency	Members	Notes
Yorkshire	Sir Francis Clifford; Sir John Savile	BW gives Thomas Clifford
York	Roger Askwith (Alderman); Christopher Brooke	
Kingston upon Hull	Anthony Cole (Alderman); John Edmonds (Alderman)	BW gives Edwards
Scarborough	Francis Eure; Sir Thomas Posthumous Hoby	
Knaresborough	Sir Henry Slingsby; Sir William Slingsby	
Richmond	Sir Talbot Bowes; Richard Perceval	
Beverley	Allan Percy; William Gee	
Aldborough	Sir Henry Savile; Sir Edmund Sheffield	
Thirsk	Sir Edward Swift; Timothy Whittingham	
Hedon	Sir Henry Constable; Sir Christopher Hilliard	Constable replaced 1610 by John Digby
Ripon	Sir John Mallory; Sir John Bennet	
Boroughbridge	John Ferne; Sir Henry Jenkins	BW gives Fane for Ferne; Ferne died replaced by Sir Richard Gargrave; Gargrave then replaced by Sir Thomas Vavasour
=== Cinque Ports ===
Constituency	Members	Notes
Hastings	Richard Lyffe; Sir George Carew	Lyffe died and was replaced 1605 by James Lasher; Carew created Baron Carew of Clopton on 4 June 1605 and replaced by Sir Edward Hales
Sandwich	Sir George Fane; Edward Peake	Peake died 1607 replaced by John Griffith
Dover	Sir Thomas Waller; George Bing	
Romney	Sir Robert Remington; John Plommer	
Hythe	Sir John Smith; Christopher Toldervey	Smith died and replaced (1609) by Norton Knatchbull
Rye	Thomas Hamon; John Young	Hamon (or Hammond) died 1607, probably replaced by Heneage Finch
Winchelsea	Adam White; Thomas Unton	
=== Wales ===
Constituency	Members	Notes
Anglesey	Sir Richard Bulkeley	
Beaumaris	William Jones	
Brecknockshire	Sir Robert Knollys	
Brecknock	Sir Henry Williams	
Cardiganshire	John Lewis	
Cardigan	William Bradshaw	
Carmarthenshire	Sir Robert Mansell	
Carmarthen	Sir Walter Rice	
Carnarvonshire	Sir William Maurice	
Carnarvon	John Griffith	Griffith died 1609 - replaced by Clement Edmondes
Denbighshire	Peter Mutton	
Denbigh Boroughs	Hugh Myddelton	
Flintshire	Roger Puleston	
Flint	Roger Brereton	
Glamorgan	Philip Herbert	Herbert ennobled - replaced by Sir Thomas Mansell
Cardiff	Matthew Davies	
Merioneth	Sir Edward Herbert	
Montgomeryshire	William Herbert	
Montgomery	Edward Whittingham	
Pembrokeshire	Alban Stepney	
Pembroke	Richard Cuney	
Haverfordwest	James Perrot	
Radnorshire	James Price	BW gives (of Pilleth)
Radnor	Sir Robert Harley	

== See also ==
- List of parliaments of England
