= Luke Garnons =

Member of the Parliament of England

Luke Garnons (died 12 February 1615) was an English merchant and politician who sat in the House of Commons variously between 1584 and 1601.

Garnons was a younger son of John Garnons of Herefordshire and became a draper in Gloucester, acquiring a number of properties in the town. As part of his civic interests in Gloucester, he was deeply involved in maritime trade from the city.

In 1566, he became an alderman of the City. He was twice sheriff (for 1565 and 1569) and three times mayor (for 1570-71, 1586–87, 1600–01) and was described as a 'sage and prudent ruler'.

Garnons was the Member of Parliament (MP) for Gloucester from 1584 to 1585.

In the years 1586–7 when Garnons was mayor of Gloucester there was a dispute over the election of a new recorder William Oldsworth and Garnons was instrumental in blocking the appointment for a while. In 1587 Garnons purchased a freehold estate at Coln St Dennis from the lord of the manor.

There was continuous political factionalism in Gloucester as the corporation was split between an establishment group which was sympathetic to puritan ideas, and a more populist faction, led by Garnons and John Jones, who had strong links with the cathedral and tried to encourage the freeman vote. In the 1588 parliamentary election Garnons and Thomas Atkyns were elected as the two more populist candidates. They represented the city until 1589. In 1597, Garnons and Oldsworth were chosen as MPs for Gloucester in 1597 and it was alleged that the bench had deliberately excluded from the poll many freemen who supported Atkyns.

Garnons married Ann Hasarde, widow of Edmund alias Edward Hasarde, draper of Gloucester and had children Peter and Magdalen.

Preceded by Nicholas Arnold; Richard Pate	Member of Parliament (MP) for Gloucester; 1584–1585; With: Thomas Atkins	Succeeded by Richard Pate; Thomas Atkins
