= John Rolle =

John Rolle may refer to:

- John Rolle (1522–1570), founder of the great Rolle family of Stevenstone
- John Rolle (born 1563), MP elected to the English parliament in 1601
- John Rolle (Cornwall MP, born 1598) (1598–1648), English Member of Parliament for Callington 1626-8 and Truro 1640–8
- John Rolle (Devon MP, born 1626) (1626–1706), English Member of Parliament for Barnstaple 1660 and Devon 1661–1679
- John Rolle (Devon MP, born 1679), British Member of Parliament for Devon, 1710–1712, and Exeter, 1713–1715 and 1722–1727
- John Rolle, 1st Baron Rolle (1756–1842), British Member of Parliament for Devon, 1780–1786
