= William Oldsworth =

Member of the Parliament of England

William Oldsworth was an English politician who sat in the House of Commons between 1597 and 1601.

== Life ==
Oldsworth was admitted to Lincoln's Inn in 1564 and became a bencher in 1584. He was appointed Recorder of Gloucester in 1587, being nominated by his predecessor Richard Pate, who may have sold him the office. Luke Garnons was instrumental in blocking the appointment during his term as mayor and Oldsworth was not elected to parliament, as would have been usual, in the 1588 or 1593 elections.

There was continuous political factionalism in Gloucester as the corporation was split between an establishment group which was sympathetic to puritan ideas, and a more populist faction, led by Garnons and John Jones, who had strong links with the cathedral and tried to encourage the freeman vote. In 1597, Garnons and Oldsworth representing opposing factions were elected Members of Parliament for Gloucester and it was alleged that the bench had deliberately excluded from the poll many freemen who supported Atkyns. Oldsworth was again elected in 1601. He was named to a number of committees in both parliaments.

He may have been a kinsman of Arnold Oldsworth, who was elected for Cirencester in 1604.
