= Golden Speech =

1601 speech by Queen Elizabeth I of England

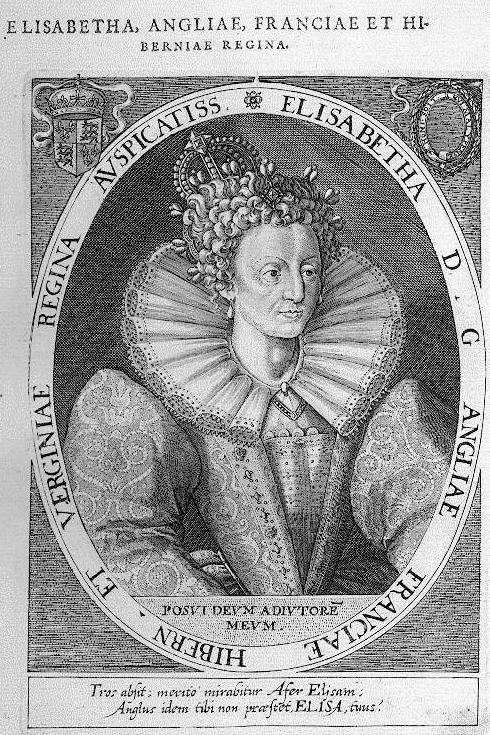
Elizabeth I of England

The Golden Speech was delivered by Queen Elizabeth I of England in the Palace Council Chamber to 141 Members of the Commons (including the Speaker), on 30 November 1601. It was a speech that was expected to address some pricing concerns, based on the recent economic issues facing the country. Ultimately, it proved to be her final address to Parliament and turned the mode of the speech to addressing the love and respect she had for the country, her position, and the Members themselves. It is reminiscent of her Speech to the Troops at Tilbury, which was given to English forces in preparation for the Spanish Armada's expected invasion. The Golden Speech has been taken to mark a symbolic end of Elizabeth's reign. Elizabeth died 16 months later in March 1603 and was succeeded by her first cousin twice removed, James I.

== Origin of the name ==
The 'Golden' label was first coined in 'a version of the speech printed near the end of the Puritan interregnum' which bore a header beginning 'This speech ought to be set in letters of gold'. It was to be reprinted time and time again up to the eighteenth century, whenever England was in danger, as the Golden Speech of Queen Elizabeth. Several versions survive, including a printed pamphlet which is thought to have been checked and corrected by Elizabeth herself.

== See also ==
- 10th Parliament of Queen Elizabeth I
- List of MPs elected to the English parliament in 1601
