= Thomas Robarts =

English politician

Member of the Parliament of England for Poole
- In office 1604–1611
- Succeeded by: Thomas Walsingham

Personal details
- Born: 8 October 1568
- Died: 1 July 1633 (aged 64)

Thomas Robarts (8 October 1568 – 1 July 1633) was an English politician who was a Member of Parliament (MP) for Poole in Dorset in the "Blessed Parliament" from 1604 to 1611.

== See also ==
- List of MPs elected to the English parliament in 1604
