= John Pitt (Bridport MP) =

English politician

Member of Parliament for Bridport
- In office 31 January 1604 – 9 February 1611

Personal details
- Born: c.1546
- Died: March 1626 (aged 80)
- Resting place: Bridport

John Pitt (c. 1546 – 1626) was an English politician who was a member of parliament (MP) for Bridport in 1604.

== See also ==
- List of MPs elected to the English parliament in 1604
