= Richard Warburton =

English politician (d. 1610)

Sir Richard Warburton (died 1610) was an English politician who sat in the House of Commons between 1601 and 1610.

Warburton was the third son of Peter Warburton of Hefferston Grange in Weaversham, Cheshire and his wife Alice Cooper, daughter of John Cooper of Abbots Bromley, Staffordshire. He was educated at Clement's Inn and then at Lincoln's Inn in 1583. He was a gentleman pensioner from around 1592 until his death. In 1600 he was Constable of Lancaster Castle and steward of Lonsdale hundred. In 1601, he was elected Member of Parliament for Bridport. He was knighted in 1603. In 1604 he was elected MP for Penryn and sat until his death in 1610.

Warburton married Anne Vavasour, the niece of Anne Vavasour, lady of the bedchamber to Queen Elizabeth I and sister of Thomas Vavasour in about 1603. (Note: The History of Parliament entry confuses Sir Richard Warburton’s wife, Anne Vavasour, with Oxford’s mistress, Anne Vavasour. The distinction between the two Anne Vavasours is clarified by Steven May in the ODNB entry for Oxford’s mistress: [Oxford’s mistress] is often confused with her niece, also Anne Vavasour, who served as a gentlewoman of the privy chamber, c.1601–3. In 1603 she married Sir Richard Warburton of London (d. 1610), the third son of Peter Warburton of Hefferston Grange, Weaversham, Cheshire, with Alice, daughter of John Cooper. Their son Cecil was Warburton's heir. This Anne was related to Anne Clifford and in the service of Lucy, countess of Bedford, before coming to court. She attended Elizabeth's funeral and received a pension of £66 13s. 4d. early in James's reign. They had a son.)

Parliament of England
| Preceded by Lewison Fitzjames; Adrian Gilbert | Member of Parliament for Bridport; 1601; With: Sir Robert Napier | Succeeded by Sir Robert Meller; John Pitt |
| Preceded by Edward Seymour; Richard Messenger | Member of Parliament for Penryn; 1604–1610; With: Thomas Prowse | Succeeded by Sir William Maynard; Sir Edward Conway |
