= Robert Meller =

Sir Robert Meller

Member of Parliament for Poole
- In office 7 October 1601 – 29 December 1601

Member of Parliament for Bridport
- In office 31 January 1604 – 9 February 1611

Personal details
- Born: c.1564 Littlebredy, Dorset, England
- Died: 1 September 1624 (aged 60) Bath, Somerset, England

Robert Meller or Miller (1564 – 1 September 1624) was an English politician who was a Member of Parliament (MP) for Poole in 1601 and Bridport in 1604.

== See also ==
- List of MPs elected to the English parliament in 1601
- List of MPs elected to the English parliament in 1604
