= Thomas Atkins (mercer) =

Member of the Parliament of England

Thomas Atkins (born c. 1538) was an English mercer and holder of public offices during the reign of Elizabeth I.

He was the eldest son of John Atkins of Ashleworth, Gloucestershire and educated at Brasenose College, Oxford, where he was awarded BA in 1554. He studied law at the Middle Temple (1558).

He was the Member of Parliament for Gloucester from 1571 to 1593.

He never married.
