= John Yaxley =

Sixteenth century English member of Parliament

John Yaxley (died c. 1625) was an English lawyer and politician who sat in the House of Commons as Member of Parliament for Cambridge between 1597 and 1611.

== Career ==
Yaxley probably entered Gray's Inn in 1573. He became an attorney in Cambridge and acquired an estate at Waterbeach, 6 miles (9.7 km) to the north.

By 1597, Yaxley was an alderman of Cambridge, and in the same year he was elected Member of Parliament for the city. He was Mayor of Cambridge in 1599–1600. He was re-elected as MP for Cambridge in 1601 and again in 1604. While an MP, Yaxley was appointed to various committees in the House.

== Lands ==
By 1610, Yaxley was steward of the manor of Waterbeach-cum-Denny. in 1614 he and Edward Aungier of Cambridge purchased the manors of Waterbeach and Causeway from the Crown for £900.

== Will ==
Yaxley made his will on 20 September 1624, and died between that date and 22 November 1626, when the will was disputed.

Parliament of England
Preceded by Thomas Goldsborough; Christopher Hodson	Member of Parliament for Cambridge; 1597–1611; With: Robert Wallis	Succeeded by Sir Robert Hitcham; Francis Brakin
