= Robert Wallis (politician) =

Robert Wallis was an English politician who sat in the House of Commons between 1597 and 1611.

Wallis came from a Cambridge family and was possibly the son of Edward Wallis, bailiff of Cambridge. By 1587 he had set up his own household and in due course became an alderman of Cambridge. He was elected Mayor of Cambridge in 1596 and refused to take the oath conserving the privileges of the university. He was re-elected mayor in the following year and took the oath in a grudging manner. Also in 1597, Wallis was elected Member of Parliament for Cambridge and was commissioner for gaol delivery for Cambridge. He served on various committees and was re-elected MP for Cambridge in 1601 and 1604. In 1606 he was re-appointed mayor on the death of the incumbent but became progressively in greater dispute with the corporation.

Parliament of England
Preceded by Thomas Goldsborough; Christopher Hodson	Member of Parliament for Cambridge; 1597–1611; With: John Yaxley	Succeeded by Sir Robert Hitcham; Francis Brakin
