= Richard Pate =

16th-century English politician

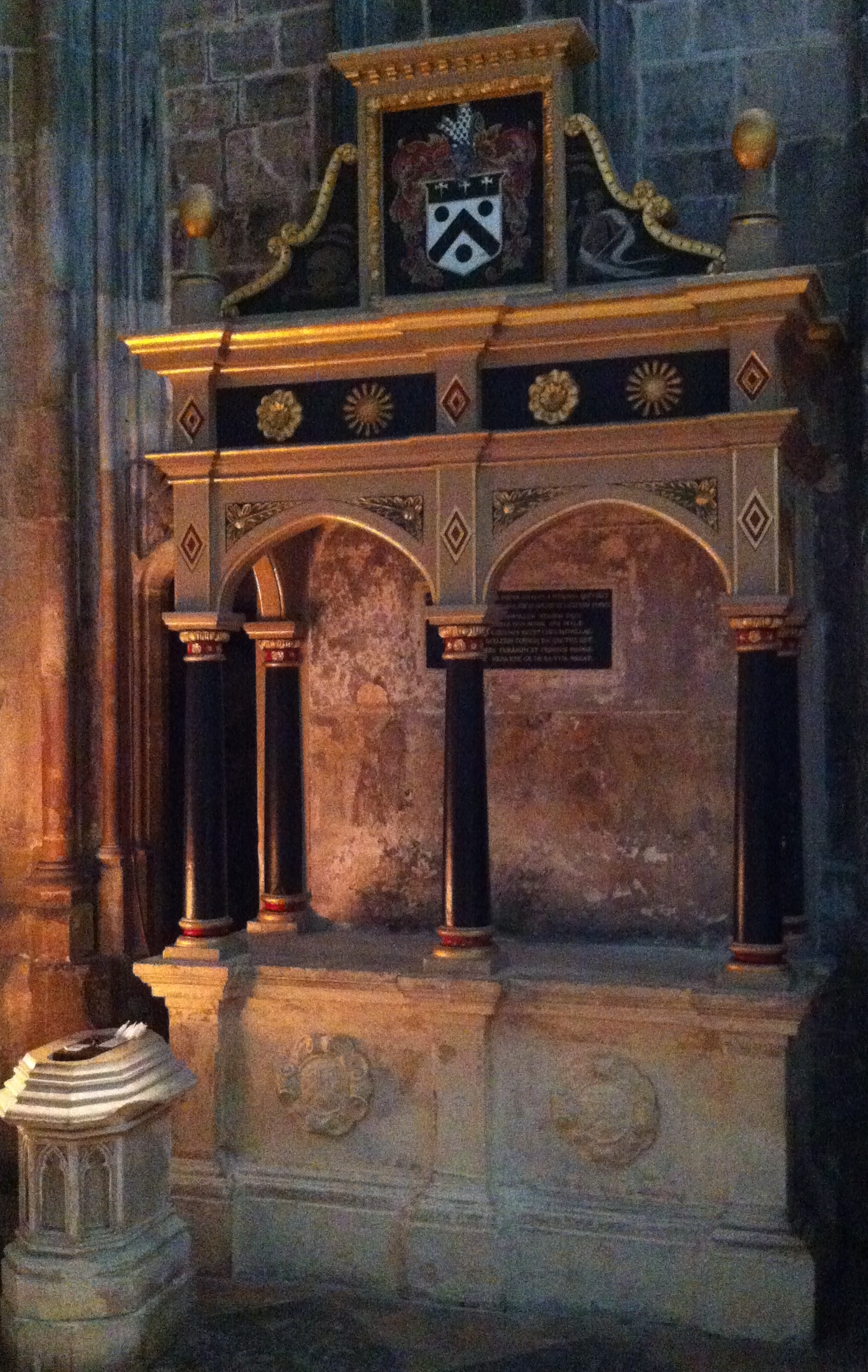
Memorial to Richard Pate in Gloucester Cathedral

Portrait (1550)

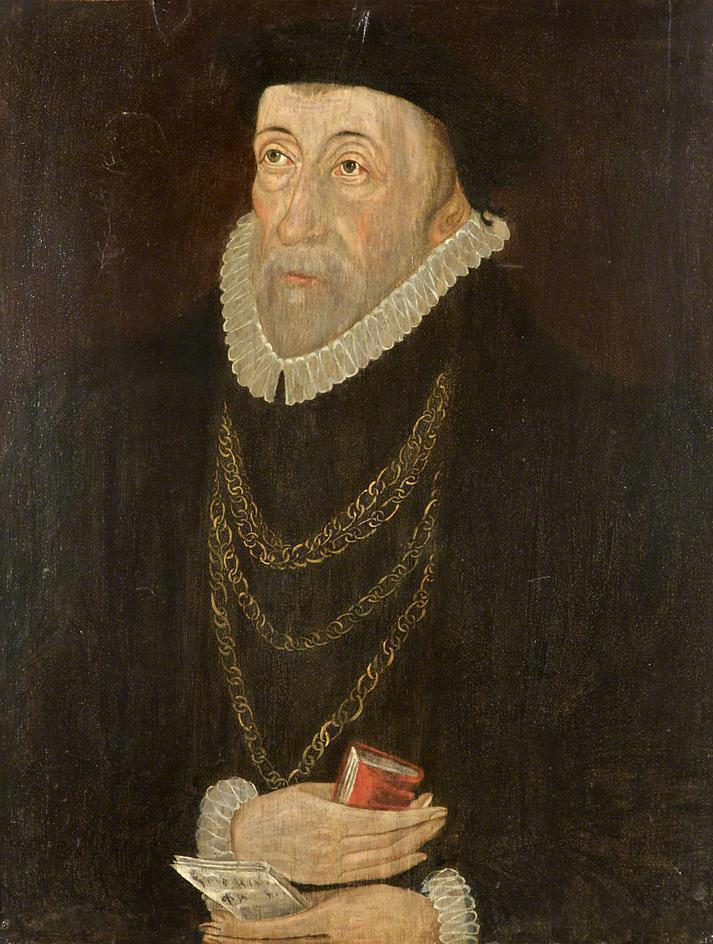
Richard Pate in later life by an unknown artist. In the collection of Gloucester City Museum & Art Gallery.

Richard Pate or Pates (1516–1588) was an English landowner and Member of Parliament for Gloucester in the Parliament of 1559 and 1563–1567. His parliamentary career is detailed in the History of Parliament.

Pate was born in Cheltenham and was a nephew of Richard Pate, Bishop of Worcester. An alumnus of Corpus Christi College, Oxford, he endowed that institution with property, on the condition that they use three-quarters of the proceeds to found and maintain a school in Cheltenham, as well as an almshouse there. This school was founded in 1574 and still exists as Pate's Grammar School. Pate also left property in Oxford to Corpus Christi.

Pate died in 1588 and is buried in Gloucester Cathedral. On his tomb is inscribed Patebit tum quod latuit, meaning what is hidden will be revealed. This is also the motto of Pate's Grammar School and the Old Patesians Rugby Football Club. He also has a primary school named after him, the Richard Pate School.

== See also ==
- Old Patesians RFC
