= List of MPs elected to the English parliament in 1656 =

This is a list of members of Parliament (MPs) in the Second Protectorate Parliament under the Commonwealth of England which began at Westminster on 17 September 1656, and was held until 4 February 1658.

This list contains details of the MPs elected in 1656. The preceding First Protectorate Parliament had excluded a number of Rotten Borough and given representation to several towns including Manchester, Leeds and Halifax and to the county and city of Durham. The Second Protectorate Parliament consisted of the same seats as its predecessor.

== List of constituencies and MPs ==
=== Bedfordshire ===
Constituency	Members	Notes
Bedfordshire	Sir William Boteler; John Harvey; Richard Wagstaffe; Richard Edwards; Samuel Bedford	
Bedford	Thomas Margets	
=== Berkshire ===
Constituency	Members	Notes
Berkshire	William Trumball; Edmund Dunch; William Hide; John Dunch; John Southby	.
Abingdon	Thomas Holt	
Reading	Daniel Blagrave	
=== Buckinghamshire ===
Constituency	Members	Notes
Buckinghamshire	Bulstrode Whitelocke; Richard Ingoldsby; Richard Hampden; Sir Richard Pigot; Richard Greenville	
Buckingham	Francis Ingoldsby .	
Wycombe	Major General Tobias Bridge	
Aylesbury	Thomas Scot	
=== Cambridgeshire ===
Constituency	Members	Notes
Cambridgeshire	Robert West; Francis Russell; Henry Pickering; Robert Castle	
Cambridge	Richard Timbs (Alderman of Cambridge)	
Cambridge University	Richard Cromwell	
Isle of Ely	John Thurloe	
=== Cheshire ===
Constituency	Members	Notes
Cheshire	Richard Legh; George Booth; Peter Brooke; Thomas Marbury	
City of Chester	Edward Bradshaw	
=== Cornwall ===
Constituency	Members	Notes
Cornwall	Thomas Ceely of Trevisham, Richard Carter; Anthony Rous, John St Aubyn; Walter Moyle; Francis Rous; Anthony Nicholl; William Braddon	
Launceston	Thomas Gewen	
Truro	Walter Vincent	
Penryn	John Fox	Borough
Eastlow and Westlow	John Buller	
=== Cumberland ===
Constituency	Members	Notes
Cumberland	Major General Charles Howard; Colonel William Briscoe	
Carlisle	George Downing	
=== Derbyshire ===
Constituency	Members	Notes
Derbyshire	Samuel Sleigh; Thomas Sanders; German Pole; John Gell	
Derby	Gervase Bennet	
=== Devon ===
Constituency	Members	Notes
Devon	Thomas Saunders; Robert Rolle; Arthur Upton; Thomas Reynell; William Morice; John Hale; John Dodderidge; Sir John Northcote, Bt; Henry Hatsell; Edmund Fowell; Sir John Yonge	
Exeter	Thomas Bampfield; Thomas Westlake	
Plymouth	John Maynard; Timothy Alsop	
Clifton Dartmouth Hardness	Edward Hopkins	
Totnes	Christopher Maynard	
Barnstaple	Sir John Coppleston	
Tiverton	Robert Shapcote	
Honiton	Samuel Serle	
=== Dorset ===
Constituency	Members	Notes
Dorset	William Sydenham; John Bingham; Robert Coker; John Fitzjames; John Trenchard; James Dewey	
Dorchester	John Whiteway	
Melcombe	Denis Bond	
Lyme Regis	Edmund Prideaux	
Poole	Edward Boteler	
=== Durham ===
Constituency	Members	Notes
County Durham	Thomas Lilburne; James Clavering	
City of Durham	Anthony Smith, Mercer.	
=== Essex ===
Constituency	Members	Notes
Essex	Sir Harbottle Grimston, 2nd Baronet; Sir Richard Everard, 1st Baronet of Much Waltham; Sir Thomas Honywood; Sir Thomas Bowes; Sir Henry Mildmay, Francis Barrington; Carew Mildmay; Dionysius Wakering; Edward Turnor; Dudley Temple; Oliver Raymond; Hezekiah Haynes; John Archer	
Maldon	Joachim Matthews	
Colchester	Henry Lawrence; John Maidstone	
=== Gloucestershire ===
Constituency	Members	Notes
Gloucestershire	George Berkeley; John Crofts; John Howe; Baynham Throckmorton; William Neast	
Gloucester	Thomas Pury; Major-General Desborough	Desborough sat for Somerset - replaced by James Stephens
Tewkesbury	Francis White	
Cirencester	John Stone	
=== Hampshire ===
Constituency	Members	Notes
Hampshire	Richard Lord Cromwell; William Goffe; Robert Wallop; Richard Norton; Thomas Cole; John Bulkeley; Edward Hooper; Richard Cobb	
Winchester	John Hildesley	
Southampton	John Lisle	
Portsmouth	Thomas Smith	
Andover	Thomas Hussey	
Isle of Wight	William Sydenham; Thomas Bowreman	.
=== Herefordshire ===
Constituency	Members	Notes
Herefordshire	James Berry (Major-General); Edward Harley; Bennet Hoskyns; Benjamin Mason	
Hereford	Wroth Rogers	
Leominster	John Birch	
=== Hertfordshire ===
Constituency	Members	Notes
Hertfordshire	Sir John Gore; William Earl of Salisbury; Sir John Wittewrong, 1st Baronet; Sir Richard Lucy, 1st Baronet; Rowland Lytton	
St Albans	Alban Cox	
Hertford	Isaac Pulter; James Cowper	
=== Huntingdonshire ===
Constituency	Members	Notes
Huntingdonshire	General Edward Montague; Henry Cromwell; Nicholas Pedley	
Huntingdon	John Bernard	
=== Kent (see also Cinque Ports) ===
Constituency	Members	Notes
Kent	Lieutenant Colonel Henry Oxenden; Richard Meredith; Sir Thomas Style, 2nd Baronet; William James; Colonel John Dixwell; John Boys; Lambert Godfrey; Colonel Richard Beal; John Selliard; Colonel Ralph Weldon; Daniel Shatterden	
Canterbury	Thomas St Nicholas; Vincent Denne	
Rochester	John Parker Recorder	
Maidstone	Sir John Banks, 1st Baronet	
Queenborough	Gabriel Livesey	
=== Lancashire ===
Constituency	Members	Notes
Lancashire	Richard Holland; Gilbert Ireland; Richard Standish; Sir Richard Hoghton, 3rd Baronet	
Preston	Richard Shuttleworth	
Lancaster	Henry Porter	
Liverpool	Thomas Birch sen.	
Manchester	Richard Radcliffe	
=== Leicestershire ===
Constituency	Members	Notes
Leicestershire	Thomas Beaumont; Francis Hacker of Okeham; William Quarks; Thomas Pochin	
Leicester	Sir Arthur Hesilrige; William Stanley	
=== Lincolnshire ===
Constituency	Members	Notes
Lincolnshire	Edward Rossiter; Thomas Hall; Thomas Lister; Charles Hall; Captain Francis Fiennes; Sir Charles Hussey, 1st Baronet; Colonel Thomas Hatcher; William Woolley; William Savile; William Welby	
Lincoln	Humphrey Walcot; Original Peart	
Boston	Sir Anthony Irby	.
Grantham	William Ellis	
Stamford	John Weaver	
Grimsby	William Wray	
=== Middlesex ===
Constituency	Members	Notes
Middlesex	Colonel John Barkstead; Sir William Roberts; Chaloner Chute; William Kiffen	
Westminster	Colonel Edward Grosvenor; Edward Cary	
City of London	Thomas Foote; Theophilus Biddulph; Thomas Adams; Richard Browne; John Jones; Sir Christopher Pack	
=== Monmouthshire ===
Constituency	Members	Notes
Monmouthshire	Major General James Berry; John Nicholas; Nathaniel Waterhouse	Berry chose for Worcestershire – replaced by Edward Herbert
=== Norfolk ===
Constituency	Members	Notes
Norfolk	Sir John Hobart; Charles Fleetwood; Sir William D'Oyly; Sir Ralph Hare, Bt; Sir Horatio Townshend; Robert Wilton; Philip Wodehouse; Robert Wood; John Buxton; Thomas Sotherton	
Norwich	Bernard Church; John Hobart	
King's Lynn	Major-General Philip Skippon; Major-General Desborough	
Yarmouth	Charles George Cook; William Burton	
=== Northamptonshire ===
Constituency	Members	Notes
Northamptonshire	Sir Gilbert Pickering, Bt; John Claypole; William Boteler; Sir James Langham, 2nd Baronet; Thomas Crew, 2nd Baron Crew; Alexander Blake	
Peterborough	Francis St John; Alexander Blake	
Northampton	Francis Harvey	
=== Northumberland ===
Constituency	Members	Notes
Northumberland	William Fenwick; Robert Fenwick of Bedlington; Thomas Widdrington	
Newcastle	Walter Strickland	
Berwick upon Tweed	George Fenwick	
=== Nottinghamshire ===
Constituency	Members	Notes
Nottinghamshire	Edward Cludd; Major-General Edward Whalley; Colonel Edward Neville; Peniston Whalley	
Nottingham	James Chadwick; William Drury	
=== Oxfordshire ===
Constituency	Members	Notes
Oxfordshire	Sir Robert Jenkinson, 1st Baronet; Charles Fleetwood; Sir Francis Norreys; William Lenthall; Miles Fleetwood	
Oxford	Richard Croke	
Oxford University	Nathaniel Fiennes	
Woodstock	William Packer	
=== Rutland ===
Constituency	Members	Notes
Rutland	William Shield; Sir Abel Barker, 1st Baronet	
=== Salop ===
Constituency	Members	Notes
Shropshire	Thomas Mackworth; Samuel More; Andrew Lloyd; Philip Young	
Shrewsbury	Samuel Jones; Humphrey Mackworth	
Bridgnorth	Edmund Waring	
Ludlow	John Aston	
=== Somerset ===
Constituency	Members	Notes
Somerset	John Buckland; General John Desborough; John Harrington; John Ashe; Robert Long; Alexander Popham; John Gorges; Francis Luttrell; Lislebone Long; William Wyndham; Francis Rolle	
Bristol	Robert Aldworth; John Dodderidge	Dodderidge sat for Devon. Replaced by Miles Jackson
Bath	James Ashe, Recorder	
Wells	John Jenkyn	
Taunton	Thomas Gorges; Robert Blake	
Bridgwater	Sir Thomas Wroth	
=== Staffordshire ===
Constituency	Members	Notes
Staffordshire	Sir Charles Wolseley, 2nd Baronet; Thomas Crompton; Thomas Whitgrave	
Lichfield	Thomas Minors	
Stafford	Martin Noel	
Newcastle-under-Lyme	John Bowyer	
=== Suffolk ===
Constituency	Members	Notes
Suffolk	Sir William Spring; Sir Thomas Barnardiston; Sir Henry Felton; Henry North; Edmund Harvey; Edward Le Neve; John Sicklemore; William Bloys; William Gibbes; Robert Brewster; Daniel Wall	
Ipswich	Nathaniel Bacon; Francis Bacon	
Bury St Edmunds	Samuel Moody; John Clarke	
Dunwich	Francis Brewster	
Sudbury	John Fothergill	
=== Surrey ===
Constituency	Members	Notes
Surrey	Sir Richard Onslow; Arthur Onslow; Francis Drake; Lewis Audley; George Duncombe; John Blackwell	
Southwark	Samuel Highland; Peter De La Noy	
Guildford	Colonel John Hewson	
Reigate	Jerome Sankey	
=== Sussex ===
Constituency	Members	Notes
Sussex	Herbert Morley; John Pelham; John Fagg; John Stapley; Anthony Shirley; George Courthope; Sir Thomas Rivers, 2nd Baronet; Sir Thomas Parker; Samuel Gott	
Chichester	Henry Peckham	
Lewes	Anthony Stapley	
East Grinstead	John Goodwin	
Arundel	Sir John Trevor	
=== Warwickshire ===
Constituency	Members	Notes
Warwickshire	Richard Lucy; Sir Roger Burgoyne; Edward Peyto; Joseph Hawksworth	
Coventry	William Purefoy; Robert Beake	
Warwick	Clement Throckmorton	
=== Westmorland ===
Constituency	Members	Notes
Westmoreland	Christopher Lister; Thomas Burton	
=== Wiltshire ===
Constituency	Members	Notes
Wiltshire	Sir Anthony Ashley Cooper; Alexander Popham; Thomas Grove; Alexander Thistlethwaite; Sir Richard Howe, 2nd Baronet Sir Walter St John, 3rd Baronet; John Bulkeley; William Ludlow; Henry Hungerford; Gabriel Martin	
Salisbury	William Stone Mayor of the City of New Sarum; James Heeley of the said City; Edward Tooker	
Marlborough	Jeremy Sankey	
Devizes	Edward Scotten	
=== Worcestershire ===
Constituency	Members	Notes
Worcestershire	Sir Thomas Rouse, 1st Baronet; Edward Pytts; Nicholas Lechmere; John Nanfan; James Berry	
Worcester	William Collins; Edmund Giles	
=== Yorkshire ===
Constituency	Members	Notes
Yorkshire	Sir William Strickland, 1st Baronet; Hugh Bethell	
West Riding	Henry Tempest; John Lambert; Edward Gill; Henry Arthington; Francis Thorpe; John Stanhope	
East Riding	Richard Darley; Henry Darley	
North Riding	Lord Eure; Francis Lascelles; Robert Lilburne; Luke Robinson	
York	Geldart; Thomas Dickenson (Alderman)	
Kingston upon Hull	William Lister	
Beverley	Francis Thorpe Baron of the Exchequer	.
Scarborough	Edward Salmon	
Richmond	John Bathurst	
Leeds	Francis Alanson; Adam Baynes	
Halifax	Jeremy Bentley	
=== Cinque Ports ===
Dover	Thomas Kelsey	
Sandwich	James Thurbarne	
Rye	William Hay	
=== Wales ===
Constituency	Members	Notes
Anglesey	George Twisleton; Griffith Bodwrda	
Brecknockshire	Philip Jones; Evan Lewis	
Cardiganshire	James Philipps; John Clark	
Carmarthenshire	John Claypole; Rowland Dawkins	Claypole chose for Northamptonshire – replaced by Robert Atkyns
Carnarvonshire	Henry Lawrence; Robert Williams	
Denbighshire	Col. John Jones; Col. John Carter	Jones replaced by Lumley Thelwall
Flintshire	John Trevor; John Glynne	
Glamorgan	Edmund Thomas	
Cardiff	John Price	
Merioneth	Col. John Jones	
Montgomeryshire	Hugh Pryce of Guernogo; Charles Lloyd	
Pembrokeshire	James Philipps; Col. John Clark	
Haverford West	John Upton	
Radnorshire	George Gwynne; Henry Williams	
=== Scotland ===
Constituency	Members	Notes
Sheriffdoms of Ross, Sutherland, and Cromarty.	Doctor Thomas Clarges	
Sheriffdom of Inverness	Col. Thomas Fitch.	
Sheriffdom of Bamff	Master Alexander Douglas	
Sheriffdom of Aberdeen	Col. William Mitchel	
Sheriffdoms of Forfar and Kinkardine	Col. David Barclay of Urre.	
Sheriffdoms of Fife and Kinross	Sir John Wemys of Bongie	
Sheriffdom of Perth	Sir Edward Rhodes, one of his Highness's Council	
Sheriffdoms of Linlithgow, Stirling and Clackmannan	Master Godfrey Rhodes	
Sheriffdoms of Dunbarton, Argyll, and Bute	Master John Lockhart, Brother-German to Col. Lockhart.	
Sheriffdoms of Aire and Renfrew	William Lord Cochrane of Dundonald.	
Sheriffdom of Lannerick	Col. William Lockhart.	
Sheriffdom of Midlothian	Samuel Desborow	
Sheriffdom of Merse	John Swinton of Swinton	
Sheriffdom of Roxborough	Master Ker of Newton	
Sheriffdoms of Selkirk and Peebles	Henry Whalley	
Sheriffdom of Dumfries	George Smith	
Sheriffdom of Wigton	Sir James Mac Dowel of Garthland.	
Sheriffdom of East-Lothian	John, Earl of Tweeddale	
Boroughs of Dornoch, Tayn, Inverness, Dingwell, Nairn, Elgin, and Farras,	Master Robert Wooseley, Commissary of Ayrshire.	
Boroughs of Banff and Aberdeen,	Col. Stephen Winththrope	
Boroughs of Forfar, Dundee, Arbroath, Montross, Brechin	Sir Alexander Wedderburn of Blackness, Clerk of Dundee.	
Boroughs of Lithgow, Queens Ferry, Perth, Culross, and Stirling	Col. Henry Markham	
Boroughs of St. Andrews, Dysart, Kirkaldy, Anstruther-East, Pittenween, Creel, Dumfermline Kinghorn, Anstruther-West, Innerleithing, Kilkenny, and Burnt-Island	Col. Nathaniel Whetham	
City of Edinburgh	Lord Broghill; Andrew Ramsay	
Boroughs of Lannerick, Glasgow, Rutherglen, Rothsay, Renfrew, Ayre, Irwynn, and Dunbarton	George Terbrax	
Boroughs of Dumfreize, Sanclare, Lochmaben, Annand, Wigton, Kirkudbright, Whithorn, and Galloway	Col. Salmon	
Boroughs of Peebles, Selkirk, Jedburgh, Lauder, North Berwick, Dunbar, and Haddington	George Downing	
=== Ireland ===
Constituency	Members	Notes
Counties of Meath and Louth	Col. John Fowk, Governor of Drogheda; William Aston	
Counties of Kildare and Wicklow	Sir Hardress Waller; Anthony Morgan	
County of Dublin	John Bysse	
City of Dublin	Richard Tighe	
Counties of Catberlougb, Wexford, Kilkenny, and Queen's County	Thomas Sadler; Daniel Redman	
Counties of Westmeath, Longford, and King's County	Theophilus Jones; Maj. Henry Owen	
Counties of Down, Antrim, and Armagh	Col. Thomas Cooper; Lt-Col James Trayle	
Towns of Carrickfergus and Belfast	John Davis	
Counties of Londonderry, Donegal, and Tyrone	Tristram Beresford; Thomas Newburgh of Lifford in County Donegal	
Towns of Derry and Coleraine	Ralph King	
Counties of Cavan, Fermanagh, and Monaghan	Richard Blaney	
Counties of Kerry, Limerick, and Clare	Major Gen. Sir Hardress Waller; Col. Henry Ingoldsby	
City and County of the City of Limerick and Kilmallock	Walter Waller	
County of Cork	Roger Boyle Lord Baron of Broghill	Sat for Edinburgh
Towns of Cork and Youghal	Col. William Jephson	
Towns of Bandon and Kinsale	Vincent Gookin	
Counties of Tipperary and Waterford	John Reynolds Commissary-General; Daniel Abbot	
Cities of Waterford and Clonmel	William Halsey	
Counties of Sligo, Roscommon, and Leitrim	Sir Robert King; John Bridges	
Counties of Galway and Mayo	Sir Charles Coote, Commissary-General; Lt Col John Brett	

== See also ==
- List of MPs elected to the English parliament in 1654 (First Protectorate Parliament)
- List of MPs elected to the English parliament in 1659 (Third Protectorate Parliament)
- Second Protectorate Parliament
