= List of MPs elected to the English parliament in 1654 =

This is a list of members of Parliament (MPs) in the First Protectorate Parliament under the Commonwealth of England which began at Westminster on 3 September 1654, and was held to 22 January 1655.

The preceding Barebone's Parliament was made up almost entirely of County seats. In this the First Protectorate Parliament, many boroughs received back their franchise. However anticipating the Reform Act by nearly 200 years, a number of rotten boroughs were excluded and representation was given to several towns including Manchester, Leeds and Halifax and to the county and city of Durham.

This list contains details of the MPs elected in 1654. Normally when a member is elected for more than one seat a choice is made regarding which seat he represents and an alternative member is chosen for the other. In this parliament however this reseating did not take place, and so some individuals are shown for two or even three seats. It was succeeded by the Second Protectorate Parliament

== List of constituencies and MPs ==
=== Bedfordshire ===
Constituency	Members	Notes
Bedfordshire	Sir William Boteler; John Harvey; Edmund Wingate; John Neale; Samuel Bedford	
Bedford	Bulstrode Whitelocke	
=== Berkshire ===
Constituency	Members	Notes
Berkshire	George Purefoy; Edmund Dunch; Sir Robert Pye; John Dunch; John Southby	
Abingdon	Thomas Holt	
Reading	Robert Hammond	
=== Buckinghamshire ===
Constituency	Members	Notes
Buckinghamshire	Bulstrode Whitelocke; Richard Ingoldsby; George Fleetwood; Sir Richard Pigot; Richard Greenville	
Buckingham	Francis Ingoldsby	
Wycombe	Thomas Scot	
Aylesbury	Henry Phillips	
=== Cambridgeshire ===
Constituency	Members	Notes
Cambridgeshire	John Delbrow; Francis Russell; Henry Pickering; Robert Castle	
Cambridge	Richard Timbs (Alderman of Cambridge)	
Cambridge University	Henry Cromwell	
Isle of Ely	John Thurloe; George Glapthorn	
=== Cheshire ===
Constituency	Members	Notes
Cheshire	John Bradshaw; George Booth; Henry Brooke (of Norton); John Crew	
City of Chester	Charles Walley	
=== Cornwall ===
Constituency	Members	Notes
Cornwall	Thomas Gewen; Thomas Ceely (of Trevisham); Richard Carter; Anthony Rous; James Launce (of Pennare); Walter Moyle; Charles Boscawen; Anthony Nichols	
Launceston	Robert Bennet	
Truro	Francis Rous	
Penryn	John Fox	
East Looe and West Looe	John Blackmore	
=== Cumberland ===
Constituency	Members	Notes
Cumberland	Major General Charles Howard; Colonel William Briscoe	
Carlisle	Colonel Thomas Fitch	
=== Derbyshire ===
Constituency	Members	Notes
Derbyshire	Nathaniel Barton; Thomas Sanders; Edward Gell; John Gell	
Derby	Gervase Bennet	
=== Devon ===
Constituency	Members	Notes
Devon	Thomas Saunders; Robert Rolle; Arthur Upton; Thomas Reynell; William Morice; John Hale; William Bastard; William Fry; Sir John Northcote, Bt; Henry Hatsell; John Quick	
Exeter	Thomas Bampfield; Thomas Gibbons	
Plymouth	Christopher Ceely (Merchant); William Yeo	
Clifton Dartmouth Hardness	Thomas Boone	
Totnes	Major-General Desborough	
Barnstaple	John Dodderidge	
Tiverton	Major John Blackmore	Blackmore declared void – replaced by Robert Shapcote
Honiton	Sir John Yonge	
=== Dorset ===
Constituency	Members	Notes
Dorset	William Sydenham; John Bingham; Sir Walter Earle; John Fitzjames; John Trenchard; Henry Henley	
Dorchester	John Whiteway	
Melcombe	Denis Bond	
Lyme Regis	Edmund Prideaux	
Poole	Sir Anthony Ashley Cooper	
=== Durham ===
Constituency	Members	Notes
County Durham	Robert Lilburne; George Lilburne	
City of Durham	Anthony Smith (Mercer)	
=== Essex ===
Constituency	Members	Notes
Essex	Sir William Masham Bt; Sir Richard Everard, 1st Baronet of Much Waltham; Sir Thomas Honywood; Sir Thomas Bowes; Sir Henry Mildmay; Thomas Coke; Carew Mildmay; Dionysius Wakering; Edward Turnor; Richard Cutts; Oliver Raymond; Herbert Pelham	
Maldon	Joachim Matthews	
Colchester	Colonel John Barkstead; John Maidstone	
=== Gloucestershire ===
Constituency	Members	Notes
Gloucestershire	George Berkeley; Matthew Hale; John Howe; Christopher Guise; Sylvanus Wood	
Gloucester	Thomas Pury; William Lenthall	
Tewkesbury	Sir Anthony Ashley Cooper	Cooper replaced by Francis St John
Cirencester	John Stone	
=== Hampshire ===
Constituency	Members	Notes
Hampshire	Richard Lord Cromwell; Richard Norton; Richard Major; John St Barbe; Robert Wallop; Francis Rivett; Edward Hooper; John Bulkeley	
Winchester	John Hildesley	
Southampton	John Lisle	
Portsmouth	Nathaniel Whetham	
Andover	John Duns (of Hurstley)	
Isle of Wight	William Sydenham; Viscount L'Isle	
=== Herefordshire ===
Constituency	Members	Notes
Herefordshire	John Scudamore; John Pateshal; John Flacket; Richard Read	
Hereford	Bennet Hoskyns	
Leominster	John Birch	
=== Hertfordshire ===
Constituency	Members	Notes
Hertfordshire	Henry Lawrence; William Earl of Salisbury; Sir John Wittewrong, 1st Baronet; Sir Richard Lucy, 1st Baronet; Thomas Nicholl	
St Albans	Alban Cox	
Hertford	Isaac Pulter	
=== Huntingdonshire ===
Constituency	Members	Notes
Huntingdonshire	Edward Montagu; Henry Cromwell (the younger); Stephen Pheasant (of Upwood)	
Huntingdon	John Bernard	
=== Kent (see also Cinque Ports) ===
Constituency	Members	Notes
Kent	Lieutenant Colonel Henry Oxenden; William James; Colonel John Dixwell; John Boys; Sir Henry Vane (senior); Lambert Godfrey; Colonel Richard Beal; Augustine Skinner; John Selliard; Colonel Ralph Weldon; Daniel Shatterden	
Canterbury	Thomas Scot; Francis Butcher	
Rochester	John Parker (Recorder)	
Maidstone	Sir John Banks, 1st Baronet	
Queensborough	Augustine Garland	
=== Lancashire ===
Constituency	Members	Notes
Lancashire	Richard Holland; Gilbert Ireland; Richard Standish; William Ashurst	
Preston	Richard Shuttleworth	
Lancaster	Henry Porter	
Liverpool	Thomas Birch sen.	
Manchester	Charles Worsley	
=== Leicestershire ===
Constituency	Members	Notes
Leicestershire	Thomas Beaumont; Henry Grey, 1st Earl of Stamford; Lord Grey of Groby; Thomas Pochin	
Leicester	Sir Arthur Hesilrige; William Stanley (Alderman)	
=== Lincolnshire ===
Constituency	Members	Notes
Lincolnshire	Edward Rossiter; Thomas Hall; Thomas Lister; Charles Hall; Captain Francis Fiennes (Sir) John Wray; Colonel Thomas Hatcher; William Woolley; William Savile; William Welby	
Lincoln	William Marshall (Alderman); Original Peart (Alderman)	
Boston	William Ellis	.
Grantham	William Bury sen	
Stamford	John Weaver	
Grimsby	William Wray	
=== Middlesex ===
Constituency	Members	Notes
Middlesex	Sir James Harrington, Bt; Sir William Roberts; Josiah Berners; Edmund Harvey	
Westminster	Thomas Latham; Thomas Falconbridge	
City of London	Thomas Foote; William Steele; Thomas Adams; John Langham; Samuel Avery; Andrew Riccard	
=== Monmouthshire ===
Constituency	Members	Notes
Monmouthshire	Richard Lord Cromwell; Philip Jones; Henry Herbert	Cromwell chose Hampshire, and Jones chose Glamorgan. Replaced by Thomas Morgan and Thomas Hughes
=== Norfolk ===
Constituency	Members	Notes
Norfolk	Sir John Hobart; Sir William D'Oyly; Sir Ralph Hare, Bt; Thomas Weld; Robert Wilton; Thomas Sotherton; Philip Wodehouse; Robert Wood (senior); Philip Bedingfield (senior); Tobias Frere	
Norwich	Bernard Church; John Hobart	
King's Lynn	Major-General Philip Skippon; Guybon Goddard (Recorder)	
Yarmouth	Colonel William Goffe; Thomas Dunn	
=== Northamptonshire ===
Constituency	Members	Notes
Northamptonshire	Sir Gilbert Pickering, Bt; John Dryden Bt. John Crew; Sir John Norwich, Bt; John Claypole, senior Thomas Brooke	
Peterborough	Humphrey Orme; Alexander Blake	
Northampton	Peter Whalley	
=== Northumberland ===
Constituency	Members	Notes
Northumberland	William Fenwick; Robert Fenwick (of Bedlington); Henry Ogle (of Eglingham)	
Newcastle	Sir Arthur Hesilrige	
Berwick upon Tweed	George Fenwick	
=== Nottinghamshire ===
Constituency	Members	Notes
Nottinghamshire	Hon. William Pierrepont; Major-General Edward Whalley; Colonel Edward Neville; Charles White	
Nottingham	James Chadwick; John Mason	
=== Oxfordshire ===
Constituency	Members	Notes
Oxfordshire	Robert Jenkinson; Charles Fleetwood; Colonel James Whitelocke; Nathaniel Fiennes; William Lenthall	Whitelocke replaced by Richard Croke
Oxford	Bulstrode Whitelocke	
Oxford University	John Owen D. D.	
Woodstock	Lieutenant-General Charles Fleetwood	
=== Rutland ===
Constituency	Members	Notes
Rutland	William Shield; Edward Horseman	
=== Salop ===
Constituency	Members	Notes
Shropshire	Humphrey Mackworth sen. Thomas Mytton; Robert Corbet; Philip Young	
Shrewsbury	Richard Cheshire; Humphrey Mackworth jun.	
Bridgnorth	William Crown	
Ludlow	John Aston	
=== Somerset ===
Constituency	Members	Notes
Somerset	Sir John Honner; John Buckland; General John Desborough; John Preston; John Harrington; John Ashe; Charles Steynings; Robert Long; Richard Jones; Thomas Hippisley; Samuel Perry	
Bristol	Richard Aldworth; Miles Jackson	
Bath	Alexander Popham	
Wells	Lislebone Long	
Taunton	Thomas Gorges; John Gorges	
Bridgwater	Robert Blake	
=== Staffordshire ===
Constituency	Members	Notes
Staffordshire	Sir Charles Wolseley, 2nd Baronet; Thomas Crompton; Thomas Whitgrave	
Lichfield	Thomas Minors	
Stafford	John Bradshaw	
Newcastle under Lyme	Edward Keeling	
=== Suffolk ===
Constituency	Members	Notes
Suffolk	Sir William Spring; Sir Thomas Barnardiston; Sir Thomas Bedingfield; William Bloys; John Gurdon; William Gibbes; John Brandling; Alexander Bence; John Sicklemore; Thomas Bacon	
Ipswich	Nathaniel Bacon; Francis Bacon	
Bury St Edmunds	Samuel Moody; John Clarke	
Dunwich	Gen. Robert Brewster	
Sudbury	John Fothergill	
=== Surrey ===
Constituency	Members	Notes
Surrey	Sir Richard Onslow; Major-General Lambert; Arthur Onslow; Francis Drake; Robert Holman; Robert Wood	
Southwark	Samuel Highland; Robert Warcup	
Guildford	Richard Hiller (of Guilford)	
Reigate	Edward Bysshe	
=== Sussex ===
Constituency	Members	Notes
Sussex	Herbert Morley; Sir Thomas Pelham, 2nd Baronet; Anthony Stapley; John Stapley; John Fagg; William Hay; John Pelham; Francis Lord Dacres; Herbert Springet	
Chichester	Henry Peckham	
Lewes	Henry Shelley	
East Grinstead	John Goodwin	
Arundel	Anthony Shirley	
=== Warwickshire ===
Constituency	Members	Notes
Warwickshire	Richard Lucy; Thomas Willoughby; Sir Richard Temple; William Purefoy	
Coventry	William Purefoy; Robert Beake	
Warwick	Richard Lucy	
=== Westmorland ===
Constituency	Members	Notes
Westmoreland	Christopher Lister; Jeremy Baynes	
=== Wiltshire ===
Constituency	Members	Notes
Wiltshire	Sir Anthony Ashley Cooper; Alexander Popham; Thomas Grove; Alexander Thistlethwaite; Francis Holles; John Ernle; William Yorke; John Norden; James Ash; Gabriel Martin	
Salisbury	Edward Tooker; William Stevens (Recorder)	
Marlborough	Charles Fleetwood	
Devizes	Sir Edward Bayntun	
=== Worcestershire ===
Constituency	Members	Notes
Worcestershire	Sir Thomas Rouse, 1st Baronet; Edward Pytts; Nicholas Lechmere; John Bridges; Talbot Badger	
Worcester	William Collins; Edward Elvines (Alderman)	
=== Yorkshire ===
Constituency	Members	Notes
Yorkshire		
West Riding	Sir Thomas Fairfax; John Lambert; Henry Tempest; John Bright; Edward Gill; Martin Lister	
East Riding	Sir William Strickland; Hugh Bethell; Richard Robinson; Walter Strickland	
North Riding	Lord Eure; Francis Lascelles; Thomas Harrison; George Smithson	
York	Sir Thomas Widdrington; Thomas Dickenson, (Alderman)	
Kingston upon Hull	William Lister	
Beverley	Francis Thorpe (Baron of the Exchequer)	
Scarborough	John Wildman	
Richmond	John Wastal (of Scornton)	
Leeds	Adam Bayns (of Knowstrop)	
Halifax	Jeremy Bentley	
=== Cinque Ports ===
Dover	William Cullen	
Sandwich	Thomas Kelsey	
Rye	Herbert Morley	
=== Wales ===
Constituency	Members	Notes
Anglesey	George Twisleton; William Foxwist	
Brecknockshire	Lord Herbert; Edmund Jones	
Cardiganshire	James Philipps; Jenkin Lloyd	
Carmarthenshire	John Claypole; Rowland Dawkins	
Carnarvonshire	John Glynne; Thomas Madryn	
Denbighshire	Col. Simon Thelwall; Col. John Carter	
Flintshire	John Trevor; Andrew Ellice	
Glamorgan	Philip Jones; Edmund Thomas	
Cardiff	John Price	
Merioneth	John Vaughan	
Montgomeryshire	Sir John Price Bt; Charles Lloyd	
Pembrokeshire	Sir Erasmus Philipps, 3rd Baronet; Arthur Owen	
Haverford West	John Upton	
Radnorshire	George Gwynne; Henry Williams	
=== Scotland ===
Constituency	Members	Notes
Sheriffdom of Inverness	Lieut. Col. William Michel	
Sheriffdoms of Forfar and Kinkardine	Col. David Barclay of Urie	
Sheriffdoms of Fife and Kinross	Col. James Hay	
Sheriffdom of Perth	George Livingston, 3rd Earl of Linlithgow	
Sheriffdoms of Linlithgow, Sterling, and Clackmannan	Col. Thomas Read (Governor of Stirling)	
Sheriffdoms of Dunbarton, Argyll, and Bute	Sir James Hamilton (of Orbiston)	
Sheriffdom of Lannerick	Col. William Lockhart	
Sheriffdom of Midlothian	George Smith (one of the Judges of Scotland)	
Sheriffdom of Merse	John Swinton (of Swinton)	
Sheriffdoms of Selkirk and Peebles	John Thompson (Auditor-General of the Revenues of Scotland)	
Sheriffdom of Dumfries	James Johnstone, 2nd Earl of Hartfell	
Sheriffdom of Wigton	Sir James MacDowel (of Garthland)	
Sheriffdom of East-Lothian	Benjamin Bridie (of Dolphinton)	
Boroughs of Forfar, Dundee, Arbroth, Montross, Buchan	Sir Alexander Wedderburn (of Blackness, Clerk of Dundee)	
Boroughs of Lithgow, Queens Ferry, Perth, Culross, and Stirling	Col. John Okey	
Boroughs of St. Andrews, Dysart, Kirkaldy, Anstruther-East, Pittenween, Creel, Dumfermline; Kinghorn, Anstruther-West, Innerleithing, Kilkenny, and Burnt-Island	James Snord (Burgess of Saint Andrews)	
City of Edinburgh	Samuel Desborrow (Commissioner for the Revenues); George Downing (Scout-Master-General)	
Boroughs of Lannerick, Glasgow, Rutherglen, Rothsay, Renfrew, Ayre, Irwynn, and Dunbarton	John Wilk (of Bromhouse)	
Boroughs of Dumfreize, Sanclare, Lochmaben, Annand, Wigton, Kirkudbright, Whithorn, and Galloway	Major Jeremiah Tolhurst (Burgess of Dumfries)	
Boroughs of Peebles, Selkirk, Jedburgh, Lander, North Berwick, Dunbar, and Haddington	William Thompson (Burgess of Haddington)	
=== Ireland ===
Constituency	Members	Notes
Counties of Meath and Louth	Col. John Fowk (Governor of Drogheda); Major William Cadogan.	
Counties of Kildare and Wicklow	Maj. Anthony Morgan; Maj. William Meredith.	
County Dublin	Colonel John Hewson (of Lutterels Town)	
City of Dublin	Daniel Hutchinson (Alderman)	
Counties of Catberlougb, Wexford, Kilkenny, and Queen's County	Thomas Sadler; Daniel Axtell	
Counties of Westmeath, Longford, and King's County	Theophilus Jones; Thomas Scot.	
Counties of Down, Antrim, and Armagh	Col. Robert Venables; Col. Arthur Hill	
Towns of Carrickfergus and Belfast	Major Daniel Redmond.	
Counties of Londonderry, Donegal, and Tyrone	Col. John Clark; Thomas Newburgh (of Lifford in County Donegal)	
Towns of Derry and Coleraine	Ralph King	
Counties of Cavan, Fermanagh, and Monaghan	Col. John Cole	
Counties of Kerry, Limerick, and Clare	Major Gen. Sir Hardress Waller; Col. Henry Ingoldsby	
City and County of the City of Limerick and Kilmallock	William Purefoy	
County of Cork	Roger Boyle, Lord Baron of Broghill	
Towns of Cork and Youghal	Col. William Jephson	
Towns of Bandon and Kinsale	Vincent Gookin	
Counties of Tipperary and Waterford	John Reynolds(Commissary-General); Jerome Sankey	
Cities of Waterford and Clonmel	William Halsey	
Counties of Sligo, Roscommon, and Leitrim	Sir Robert King; Sir John Temple	
Counties of Galway and Mayo	Sir Charles Coote (Commissary-General); John Reynolds	

== See also ==
- List of MPs elected to the English parliament in 1656 (Second Protectorate Parliament)
- List of MPs elected to the English parliament in 1659 (Third Protectorate Parliament)
- List of parliaments of England
- First Protectorate Parliament
