= Sir Anthony Shirley, 1st Baronet =

English politician

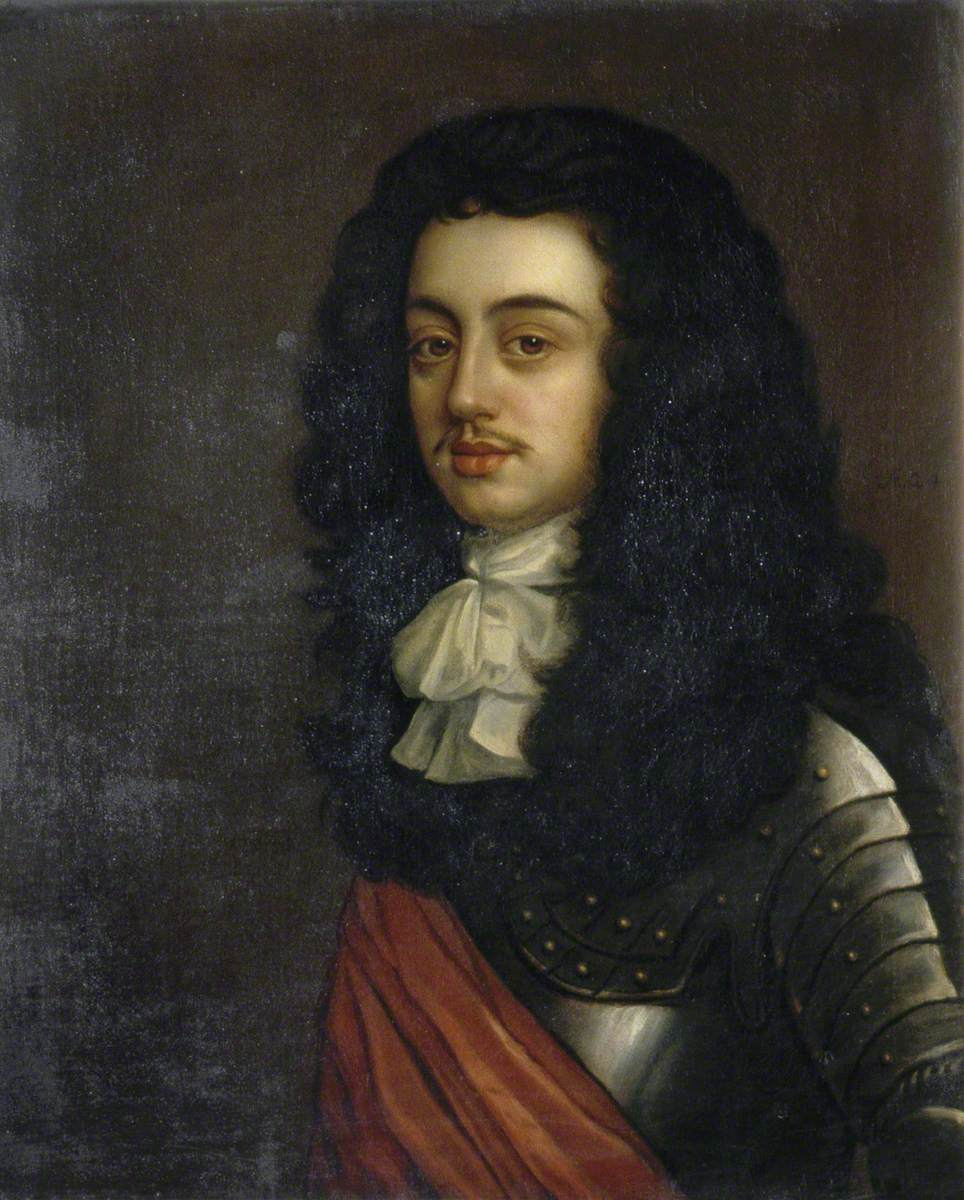
Image of Sir Anthony Shirley

Sir Anthony Shirley, 1st Baronet (1624 – June 1683) was an English politician who sat in the House of Commons between 1654 and 1659.

Shirley was the son of Thomas Shirley of Preston Manor, Brighton and his wife Elizabeth Stapley, daughter of Drew Stapley of London. He matriculated at Magdalen Hall, Oxford, on 14 July 1642 aged 14. He was in the commission of peace for the Commonwealth. In 1654, he was elected Member of Parliament for Arundel in the First Protectorate Parliament. He was elected MP for Sussex in 1656 for the Second Protectorate Parliament. In 1659 he was elected MP for Steyning in the Third Protectorate Parliament. He was created baronet on 6 March 1666. He was appointed High Sheriff of Sussex in 1667, but did not take office.

Shirley died at the age of 58 and was buried at Preston Manor on 22 June 1683.

Shirley married Anne Onslow, daughter of Sir Richard Onslow of West Clandon, Surrey on 2 July 1650 at Cranleigh, Surrey. He was succeeded in the baronetcy by his son Richard.

Parliament of England
Preceded by Not represented in Barebones Parliament	Member of Parliament for Arundel; 1654	Succeeded by Sir John Trevor
Preceded by Herbert Morley; Sir Thomas Pelham, Bt; Anthony Stapley; John Stapley; John Fagg; William Hay; John Pelham; Francis Lord Dacres; Herbert Springet	Member of Parliament for Sussex; 1656; With: Herbert Morley; John Pelham; John Fagg; John Stapley; George Courthope; Sir Thomas Rivers, Bt; Sir Thomas Parker; Samuel Gott	Succeeded by Herbert Morley; Sir John Fagg, 1st Baronet
Preceded by Not represented in Second Protectorate Parliament	Member of Parliament for Steyning; 1659; With: Sir John Trevor	Succeeded by Not represented in Restored Rump
Baronetage of England
New creation	Baronet (of Preston); 1666–1683	Succeeded by Richard Shirley
