= Sir Thomas Rivers, 2nd Baronet =

English politician

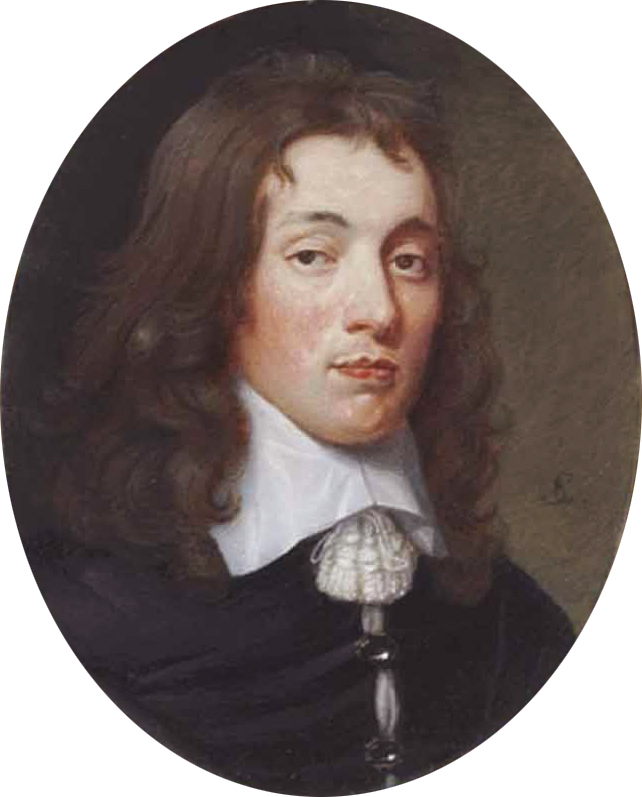
Thomas Rivers, by Samuel Cooper after Peter Lely

Sir Thomas Rivers, 2nd Baronet (died 1657) was an English politician who sat in the House of Commons in 1656.

Rivers was the son of James Rivers and his wife Charity Shirley, daughter of Sir John Shirley of Isfield Sussex. He succeeded his grandfather Sir John Rivers, 1st Baronet to the baronetcy in around 1651, his father having died earlier.

In 1656, Rivers was elected Member of Parliament for Sussex in the First Protectorate Parliament.

Rivers died unmarried in around 1657.

Parliament of England
Preceded by Herbert Morley; Sir Thomas Pelham, Bt; Anthony Stapley; John Stapley; John Fagg; William Hay; John Pelham; Francis Lord Dacres; Herbert Springet	Member of Parliament for Sussex; 1656; With: Herbert Morley; John Pelham; John Fagg; John Stapley; Anthony Shirley; George Courthope; Sir Thomas Parker; Samuel Gott	Succeeded by Herbert Morley; John Fagg
Baronetage of England
Preceded by John Rivers	Baronet (of Chafford); 1651–1657	Succeeded by John Rivers
