= George Courthope =

English politician

Sir George Courthorpe (3 June 1616 – 18 November 1685) was an English politician who sat in the House of Commons between 1656 and 1679.

Courthorpe was the son of George Courthorpe, of Ticehurst, Sussex. He matriculated at University College, Oxford on 22 June 1632 aged 16, and was awarded BA on 8 May 1635.

In 1656, Courthorpe was elected Member of Parliament for Sussex in the Second Protectorate Parliament. In 1659 he was elected MP for East Grinstead in the Third Protectorate Parliament. He was re-elected MP for East Grinstead in the Convention Parliament in 1660. In 1661, he was knighted at Windsor on 24 April and re-elected MP for East Grinstead in the Cavalier Parliament He sat until 1679.

Courthorpe died at the age of 69 and was buried at Ticehurst.

Parliament of England
Preceded by Herbert Morley; Sir Thomas Pelham, 2nd Baronet; Anthony Stapley; John Stapley; John Fagg William Hay; John Pelham; Francis Lord Dacres Herbert Springet	Member of Parliament for Sussex; 1656; With: Herbert Morley; John Pelham; John Fagg; John Stapley; Anthony Shirley; Sir Thomas Rivers, 2nd Baronet; Sir Thomas Parker; Samuel Gott	Succeeded by Herbert Morley; Sir John Fagg, 1st Baronet
Preceded by John Goodwin	Member of Parliament for East Grinstead; 1659; With: Robert Goodwin	Succeeded by Robert Goodwin, Edward Sackville
