= Sir Herbert Springet, 1st Baronet =

English politician

Sir Herbert Springet, 1st Baronet (ca. 1613 – 5 January 1662) was an English politician who sat in the House of Commons at various times between 1646 and 1662.

== Life ==
Springet was the eldest son of Sir Thomas Springet of Broyle Place and his wife Mary Bellingham, daughter of John Bellingham of Erringham, Shoreham. He was educated at Hawkhurst Grammar School under Mr Godwin and was admitted at Christ's College, Cambridge on 3 July 1628, aged 15. He was a student of Middle Temple in 1630 and travelled abroad in France in 1635.

In August 1643 he was named to the Sussex committee for the 'speedy Raising and Levying of Money, for the Maintenance of the Army raised by the Parliament, and other great Affairs of the Commonwealth'. In 1646 Springet was elected Member of Parliament (MP) for New Shoreham as a replacement in the Long Parliament and held the seat until he was excluded in Pride's Purge in 1648. He was also an MP for Sussex in the First Protectorate Parliament from 1654 to 1655.

Springet baronets
- Escutcheon of the Springet baronets of Broyle Place
- Creation date: 1661
- Status: extinct
- Extinction date: 1662
- Seat: Broyle Place

In April 1660 Springet was again elected MP for New Shoreham in the Convention Parliament. Springet became a Baronet of Broyle Place, Sussex 8 January 1661. It became extinct on his death. In 1661 he was elected MP for Shoreham again for the Cavalier Parliament.

Springet died in 1662 aged 48.

He married Barbara, daughter of Sir William Campion of Combwell, Kent in 1634. William Campion (1640–1702) was his nephew. His daughter Barbara married Sir William Thomas, 1st Baronet MP for Seaford and Sussex.

Parliament of England
Preceded by William Marlott; John Alford	Member of Parliament for New Shoreham; 1646–1648; With: John Alford	Springet and Alford excluded in Pride's Purge - both seats vacant
Preceded by Anthony Stapley; William Spence; Nathaniel Studeley	Member of Parliament for Sussex; 1654; With: Herbert Morley; Sir Thomas Pelham, 2nd Baronet; Anthony Stapley; John Stapley; John Fagg; William Hay; John Pelham; Francis Lord Dacres	Succeeded by Herbert Morley; John Pelham; John Fagg; John Stapley; Anthony Shirley; George Courthope; Sir Thomas Rivers, 2nd Baronet; Sir Thomas Parker; Samuel Gott
Vacant Not represented in the restored Rump	Member of Parliament for New Shoreham; 1660–1662; With: Edward Blaker	Succeeded by William Quatremaine; Edward Blaker
Baronetage of England
New creation	Baronet (of Broyle Place); 1661–1662	Extinct
