= Herbert Morley =

English politician

Herbert Morley (2 April 1616 – 29 September 1667) was an English politician who sat in the House of Commons variously between 1640 and 1667. He fought as an officer for the Parliamentarians in the English Civil War. Later he was appointed Lieutenant of the Tower of London.

Morley was the son of Robert Morley of Glynde Place, Sussex and his wife Susanna Hodgson, daughter and heiress of Thomas Hodgson, of Framfield. He was at school at Lewes and was admitted at Emmanuel College, Cambridge on 9 May 1632. He was admitted at the Inner Temple in November 1634.

He served as a Justice of the Peace for Sussex from 1641 to 1660.

Morley was elected Member of Parliament for Lewes just before the dissolution of the Short Parliament. In November 1640, he was re- elected MP for Lewes in the Long Parliament. In the civil war he became a colonel in the Parliamentary Army and was chief agent for raising troops, and sequestrating estates, in Sussex. Morley was the leader of the Parliamentarian army at the Battle of Muster Green, fought on the first week of December 1642 on Muster Green in Haywards Heath in Sussex, and won the battle. He was nominated one of the King's judges, but refused to act. He was a member of the Council of State between 1650 and 1653. In 1654 he was returned as MP for Sussex and for Rye in the First Protectorate Parliament. In 1656 he was elected as MP for Sussex in the Second Protectorate Parliament. In 1659 he was elected MP for Sussex and for Lewes in the Third Protectorate Parliament. He was member of the Council of State and an Admiralty Commissioner in 1659

In 1660, Morley was a member of the Council of State and was elected MP for Rye in the Convention Parliament. He refused to negotiate the King's return and purchased a pardon in 1660. He was re-elected MP for Rye in 1661 for the Cavalier Parliament and sat until his death in 1667.

Morley died at the age of 51.

Parliament of England
Preceded by Anthony Stapley; James Rivers	Member of Parliament for Lewes; 1640–1653; With: Henry Shelley	Succeeded by Not represented in Barebones Parliament
Preceded by Not represented in Barebones parliament	Member of Parliament for Rye; 1654	Succeeded by William Hay
Preceded by Anthony Stapley; William Spence; Nathaniel Studeley	Member of Parliament for Sussex; 1654–1659; With: John Fagg 1654–1659; Sir Thomas Pelham, 2nd Baronet 1654–1656; John Stapley 1654–1656; William Hay 1654; John Pelham 1654; Francis Lord Dacres 1654; Herbert Springet 1654; Anthony Stapley 1654; Anthony Shirley 1656; George Courthope 1656; Sir Thomas Rivers, 2nd Baronet 1656; Sir Thomas Parker 1656; Samuel Gott 1656	Succeeded by Not represented in Restored Rump
Preceded by Anthony Stapley	Member of Parliament for Lewes; 1659; With: Richard Boughton 1659	Succeeded by Nizel Rivers; Sir John Stapley
