= Thomas Pelham, 1st Baron Pelham =

English Whig politician and Member of Parliament

The Right Honourable The Lord Pelham Bt
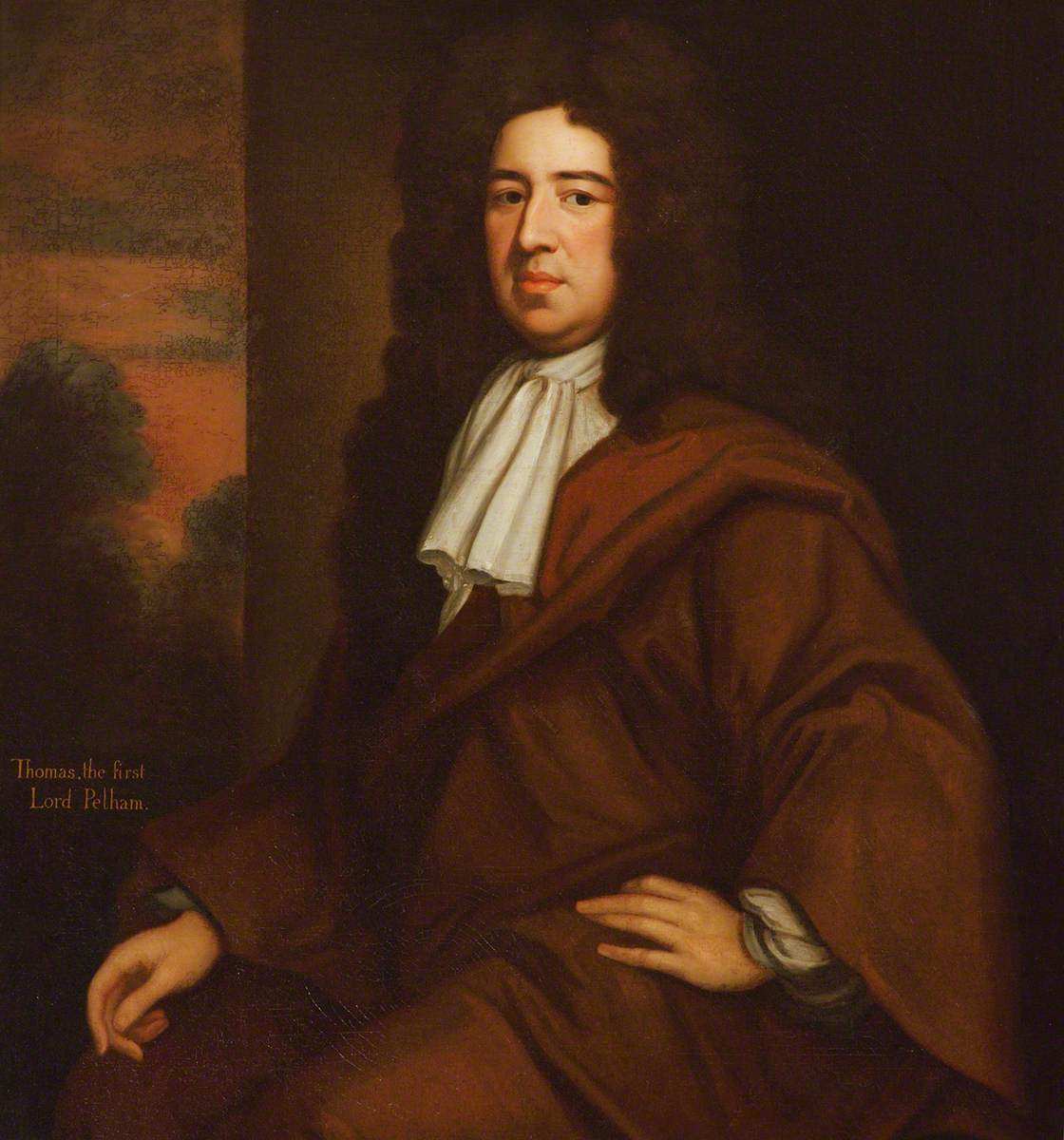

Member of the English Parliament for East Grinstead
- In office 1678–1679

Member of the English Parliament for Lewes
- In office 1679–1702

Member of the English Parliament for Sussex
- In office 1702–1705

Personal details
- Born: c. 1653
- Died: 23 February 1712
- Spouse(s): Elizabeth Jones (m. 1679, died 1681); Grace Holles (m. 1686, died 1700)
- Children: Elizabeth Townshend, Viscountess Townshend; Lucy Pelham; Grace Naylor; Thomas Pelham-Holles, 1st Duke of Newcastle-under-Lyne; Henry Pelham; Frances Wandesford, Viscountess Castlecomer; Gertrude Polhill; Lucy Clinton, Countess of Lincoln; Margaret, Lady Shelley
- Parents: Sir John Pelham, 3rd Baronet (father); Lucy Sidney (mother)

Thomas Pelham, 1st Baron Pelham of Laughton Bt (c. 1653 – 23 February 1712) was a moderate English Whig politician and Member of Parliament for several constituencies. He is best remembered as the father of two British prime ministers (Henry Pelham and the Duke of Newcastle) who, between them, served for 18 years as prime minister.

Pelham was born in Laughton, Sussex, the son of Sir John Pelham, 3rd Baronet and his wife Lucy Sidney (daughter of Robert Sidney, 2nd Earl of Leicester). Pelham was educated at Tonbridge School and Christ Church, Oxford.

He sat for East Grinstead from October 1678 until August 1679. In October 1679 he was returned for Lewes, serving until 1702; he subsequently chose to sit for Sussex, a seat he held until 1705.

== Personal life ==
On 26 November 1679 Pelham married Elizabeth Jones, daughter of Sir William Jones, Attorney General from 1650 to 1679 and his wife Elizabeth Alleyn, with whom he had two daughters:

- Hon. Elizabeth Pelham (died 11 May 1711), married Charles Townshend, 2nd Viscount Townshend
- Hon. Lucy Pelham, died unmarried

Pelham's wife Elizabeth died in October 1681. In May 1686, he married Lady Grace Holles (daughter of Gilbert Holles, 3rd Earl of Clare and Grace Pierrepoint), with whom he had two sons and five daughters:

- Hon. Grace Pelham (died 1710), married George Naylor
- Thomas Pelham-Holles, 1st Duke of Newcastle (1693–1768)
- Hon. Henry Pelham (1694–1754)
- Hon. Frances Pelham (died 27 June 1756), married Christopher Wandesford, 2nd Viscount Castlecomer
- Hon. Gertrude Pelham, married Edmund Polhill
- Hon. Lucy Pelham (died 20 July 1736), married Henry Clinton, 7th Earl of Lincoln
- Hon. Margaret Pelham (died 23 November 1758), married Sir John Shelley, 4th Baronet

Both of Pelham's sons went on to serve as Prime Minister of the United Kingdom. He served as a Lord Commissioner of the Treasury for three separate periods (March 1690–March 1692; May 1697–June 1699 and March 1701–May 1702); in 1706, he was elevated to the peerage as Baron Pelham of Laughton (having previously succeeded to his father's baronetage in 1703).

== Sources ==
- "Pelham, Thomas, first Baron Pelham". Oxford Dictionary of National Biography (online ed.). Oxford University Press. doi:10.1093/ref:odnb/21797. (Subscription, Wikipedia Library access or UK public library membership required.)

Parliament of England
Preceded by George Courthope; Edward Sackville	Member of Parliament for East Grinstead; 1678–1679; With: George Courthope 1678–1679; Edward Sackville 1679; Henry Powle 1679; Sir Thomas Littleton 1679	Succeeded by Goodwin Wharton; William Jephson
Preceded by William Morley; Richard Bridger	Member of Parliament for Lewes; 1679–1702; With: Richard Bridger 1679–1695; Henry Pelham 1695–1701, 1701–1702; Thomas Trevor 1701–1702; Richard Payne 1702	Succeeded by Richard Payne; Sir Nicholas Pelham
Preceded by Sir William Thomas; Sir Henry Peachey	Member of Parliament for Sussex; 1702–1705; With: Henry Lumley	Succeeded by John Morley Trevor; Sir George Parker
Honorary titles
Preceded by Charles Goring	Vice-Admiral of Sussex; 1705–1712	Succeeded by The Lord Ashburnham
Peerage of England
New creation	Baron Pelham; 1706–1712	Succeeded by Thomas Pelham-Holles
Baronetage of England
Preceded by John Pelham	Baronet (of Laughton); 1703–1712	Succeeded by Thomas Pelham-Holles
