= Sir Thomas Dyke, 1st Baronet =

English Tory politician

Arms of Dyke: Or, three cinquefoils sable

Sir Thomas Dyke, 1st Baronet (c. 1650 – 31 October 1706) was an English Tory politician who sat in the House of Commons between 1685 and 1698.

Dyke was the son of Sir Thomas Dyke and his wife Catharine Bramstone, daughter of Sir John Bramstone, of Skreenes, Essex. He was educated at Westminster School and Christ Church, Oxford. He entered Middle Temple in 1667 and later travelled abroad. He lived at Horeham, in Sussex and was created a baronet, of Horeham in the County of Sussex, on 3 March 1677. From 1677 to 1679 he was a commissioner for assessment in Sussex.

Dyke was elected Member of Parliament (MP) for Sussex in 1685 and held the seat until 1689. During this period, as a high church Anglican, he was in disagreement with King James II, which caused an interruption to his term as J.P. and Deputy Lieutenant. In 1689 he was elected MP for East Grinstead and held the seat until 1698. He was commissioner of Public Accounts in 1696.

Dyke died aged 56.

Dyke married Philadelphia Nutt, the daughter of Thomas Nutt, of Selmeston, Sussex. Their son Thomas succeeded to the baronetcy and their daughter Philadelphia married Lewis Stephens, D.D.

Parliament of England
Preceded by Sir William Thomas, Bt; Sir John Fagg, Bt	Member of Parliament for Sussex; 1685–1689; With: Sir Henry Goring, Bt	Succeeded by Sir John Pelham, Bt; Sir William Thomas, Bt
Preceded by Simon Smith; Thomas Jones	Member of Parliament for East Grinstead; 1689–1698; With: Thomas Sackville 1689–1693; Simon Smith 1693–1695; The Earl of Orrery 1695; John Conyers 1695–1698	Succeeded by The Earl of Orrery; John Conyers
Baronetage of England
New creation	Baronet (of Horeham); 1677–1706	Succeeded by Thomas Dyke
