= Sir John Pelham, 3rd Baronet =

English landowner and Member of Parliament (1623–1703)

Deputy lieutenant Sussex
- In office 1660–1703

Member of Parliament for Sussex
- In office 1654-1679 – 1689-1695

Member of Parliament for Hastings
- In office October 1645 – December 1648 (excluded in Pride's Purge

Personal details
- Born: 1623 Laughton, East Sussex
- Died: 8 January 1703 (aged 79) Laughton, East Sussex
- Resting place: All Saints Church, Laughton
- Party: Whig
- Spouse: Lady Lucy Sydney (1647-1685)
- Children: Elizabeth; Lucy; Thomas (1653–1712); John; Henry (c.1661–1721)
- Education: Emmanuel College, Cambridge
- Occupation: Landowner and politician

Sir John Pelham, 3rd Baronet (1623–1703) was an English landowner and Member of Parliament who sat in the Commons between 1645 and 1698.

== Personal details ==
John Pelham was born in 1623, eldest son of Sir Thomas Pelham, 2nd Baronet, and his wife Mary Wilbraham, daughter of Sir Roger Wilbraham, the Solicitor General for Ireland.

In January 1647, he married Lady Lucy Sydney, daughter of Robert Sidney, 2nd Earl of Leicester and his wife Lady Dorothy Percy. They had three sons and three daughters:

- Dorothy Pelham, died at two days old (15 December 1648 - 17 December 1648)
- Elizabeth Pelham, married Edward Montagu
- Lucy Pelham, married Gervase Pierrepont, 1st Baron Pierrepont
- Thomas Pelham, 1st Baron Pelham (1653–1712)
- John Pelham, died unmarried
- Henry Pelham (c.1661–1721)

He was succeeded by his son Thomas who was created Baron Pelham in 1706.

== Career ==
In 1645, Pelham was elected Member of Parliament for Hastings to replace disabled Royalists in the Long Parliament. He was secluded in Pride's Purge in 1648. He inherited the baronetcy on the death of his father in 1654. In 1654 he was elected MP for Sussex in the First Protectorate Parliament and continued sitting in the Second Protectorate Parliament until 1658. After the Stuart Restoration, he sat as MP for Sussex from 1660 to 1681, and after the November 1688 Glorious Revolution, was re-elected in 1689 before retiring in 1698.

In 1694, Pelham attended a cricket match at Lewes and his personal accounts refer to him paying for a wager at the time. This is one of the earliest references in cricket history in which a named individual is involved.

== Sources ==
- Crook, B.M (1983). PELHAM, Sir John, 3rd Bt. (c.1623-1703), of Halland, Laughton, Suss in The History of Parliament: the House of Commons 1660–1690. CUP. ISBN 978-1107002258.
- Major, John (2007). More Than A Game. HarperCollins.

Parliament of England
Preceded by John Ashburnham; Sir Thomas Eversfield	Member of Parliament for Hastings; 1645–1648; With: Roger Gratwick	Succeeded by Roger Gratwick
Preceded by Anthony Stapley; William Spence; Nathaniel Studeley	Member of Parliament for Sussex; 1654–1659; With: Herbert Morley; Sir Thomas Pelham, 2nd Baronet; Anthony Stapley; John Stapley; William Hay; John Fagg; Francis Lord Dacres; Sir Herbert Springet, 1st Baronet	Succeeded by Not represented in restored Rump
Preceded by Not represented in restored Rump	Member of Parliament for Sussex; 1660–1681; With: Henry Goring; John Ashburnham; Sir William Morley; John Lewknor; Sir Nicholas Pelham	Succeeded by Sir William Thomas, 1st Baronet; Sir John Fagg, 1st Baronet
Preceded by Sir Henry Goring, 2nd Baronet; Sir Thomas Dyke, 1st Baronet	Member of Parliament for Sussex; 1689–1698; With: Sir William Thomas, 1st Baronet	Succeeded by Sir William Thomas, 1st Baronet; Robert Orme
Baronetage of England
Preceded by Thomas Pelham	Baronet (of Laughton); 1654–1703	Succeeded by Thomas Pelham
