= Sir Thomas Pelham, 2nd Baronet =

English politician

Sir Thomas Pelham, 2nd Baronet (September 1597 – 1654) was an English politician who sat in the House of Commons of England variously between 1621 and 1654. He supported the Parliamentarian cause in the English Civil War.

Pelham was the son of Sir Thomas Pelham, 1st Baronet of Halland in Laughton and his wife Mary Walsingham. He was baptised at East Hoathly on 22 September 1597.

Pelham was elected Member of Parliament for East Grinstead in 1621 and held the seat to 1622. In 1624 he was elected M.P. for Sussex in the last parliament of King James I and was re-elected in 1625 in the first parliament of King Charles I. He succeeded to the baronetcy of Laughton, Co. Sussex on the death of his father on 2 December 1624.

In April 1640, Pelham was elected Member of Parliament for Sussex in the Short Parliament. He was re-elected in November 1640 for the Long Parliament and sat until he was secluded under Pride's Purge in 1648. In 1654, he was re-elected with his son among others for Sussex in the First Protectorate Parliament.

Pelham died at the age of 57 and was buried at Laughton on 28 August 1654.

Pelham married, firstly, Mary Wilbraham, daughter of Sir Roger Wilbraham, Solicitor General for Ireland, and Mary Baber. His second wife was Judith Shurley, widow of John Shurley of Lewes and daughter of Sir Robert Honeywood and Alice Barnham. He married thirdly on 3 June 1640 at Lambeth, London Margaret Vane, daughter of Sir Henry Vane the Elder. His son John succeeded to the baronetcy.

By Mary Wilbraham, he had two sons and four daughters:

- Sir John Pelham, 3rd Baronet (1623–1703)
- Thomas Pelham (d. 1638), died young
- Judith Pelham (d. 1700), married Sir John Monson
- Anne Pelham (d. c.1644)
- Jane Pelham (d. 1635)
- Elizabeth Pelham, married Henry Pelham of Lincolnshire

He had no surviving children by Judith Shurley, but one son and one daughter by Margaret survived him:

- Sir Nicholas Pelham (c.1650–1739)
- Philadelphia Pelham, married Francis Howard, 5th Baron Howard of Effingham

Parliament of England
Preceded by Sir Henry Compton; George Rivers	Member of Parliament for East Grinstead; 1621–1622; With: Sir Henry Compton	Succeeded by Robert Heath; Thomas Caldicot
Preceded by Edward Sackville; Christopher Neville	Member of Parliament for Sussex; 1624–1625; With: Algernon, Lord Percy 1624; Sir John Shurley 1625	Succeeded by Sir Walter Covert; Sir Alexander Temple
Parliament suspended since 1629	Member of Parliament for Sussex; 1640–1648; With: Anthony Stapley	Succeeded by Anthony Stapley
Preceded by Anthony Stapley; William Spence; Nathaniel Studeley	Member of Parliament for Sussex; 1654; With: Herbert Morley; Sir John Pelham, 3rd Baronet; Anthony Stapley; John Stapley; William Hay; Sir John Fagg, 1st Baronet; Francis Lord Dacres; Sir Herbert Springet, 1st Baronet	Not represented in restored Rump
Baronetage of England
Preceded by Thomas Pelham	Baronet (of Laughton); 1624–1654	Succeeded by John Pelham
