= Anthony Morgan (politician) =

English Royalist politician and soldier

Sir Anthony Morgan FRS (1621–1668) was an English Royalist politician and soldier. In the English Civil War he was first a Royalist captain and then in 1646 changed sides and joined the Parliamentary army. He was a captain in Ireton's horse (cavalry) in Ireland in 1649 and had risen to the rank of major by 1662. He was a Member of Parliament for the Irish constituency of Wicklow and Kildare in the parliaments of 1654 to 1658, and represented the Irish constituency of Meath and Louth in 1659. The Lord Protector Oliver Cromwell knighted him in 1656 and after the Restoration, he was also knighted by King Charles II in 1660. He was a commissioner of the English auxiliaries in France and an original member of the Royal Society in 1663.

== Biography ==
Morgan was born in 1621, son of Anthony Morgan, D.D., rector of Cottesbrook, Northamptonshire, fellow of Magdalen College, and principal of Alban Hall 1614–1620. The elder branches of the family were seated in Monmouthshire, where they possessed considerable influence. Anthony matriculated at Oxford from Magdalen Hall on 4 November 1636, was demy of Magdalen College from 1640 until 1646, and graduated B.A. on 6 July 1641.

Upon the outbreak of the First English Civil War he at first bore arms for the king, and was made a captain. The prospect of having his estate sequestered proved, however, little to his liking. He therefore, in March 1645, sent up his wife to inform the Committee of Both Kingdoms that he and Sir Trevor Williams undertook to deliver Monmouthshire and Glamorgan into Parliament's hands if they received adequate support. He also hinted that he ought to be rewarded by the command of a regiment of horse (cavalry). Colonel (afterwards Sir Edward) Massey was instructed to give him all necessary aid. By January 1646 he had performed his task with such conspicuous success that Sir Thomas Fairfax was directed to give him a command in his army until a regiment could be found for him in Wales, and on 3 November following the order from the House of Lords for taking off his sequestration was agreed to by the House of Commons.

Morgan, an able, cultured man, soon won the friendship of Fairfax. By Fairfax's recommendation he was created M.D. at Oxford on 8 May 1647. On 8 October 1648 Fairfax wrote to the Speaker William Lenthall, asking the Commons to pass the ordinance from the Lords for indemnifying Morgan for anything done by him in relation to the war, and on 27 October he wrote again, strongly recommending Morgan for service in Ireland. Both his requests were granted, and Morgan became captain in Ireton's regiment of horse. Various grievances existed at the time in the regiment, and the officers, knowing that Morgan could rely on the favour of Fairfax, asked him to forward a petition to the general. He took up his command in Ireland about 1649.

In 1651 Parliament granted him leave to stay in London for a few weeks to prosecute some chancery suits upon presenting a certificate that he had taken the engagement in Ireland; and in 1652, upon his petition, they declared him capable of serving the Commonwealth, notwithstanding his former delinquency. By then He was a major.

In the First (1654) and Second Protectorate parliaments Morgan represented the counties of Kildare and Wicklow, and in Third (1659) Meath and Louth. He became a great favourite with lord-deputy Henry Cromwell, and when in town corresponded with him frequently. In July 1656 on being sent over specially to inform the Protector of the state of Ireland, he was knighted at Whitehall. The next year Henry Cromwell requested him to assist Sir Timothy Tyrrell in arranging for the purchase of Archbishop Ussher's library.

At the Restoration Charles II knighted him, 19 November 1660, and appointed him commissioner of the English auxiliaries in the French army. When the Royal Society was instituted Morgan was elected an original fellow, 20 May 1663, and often served on the council. Pepys, who dined with him at Lord Brouncker's in March 1668, thought him a "very wise man". He died in France between 3 September and 24 November 1668. Owing to political differences he lived on bad terms with his wife Elizabeth, who, being a staunch republican, objected to her husband turning loyalist.
