= Nizel Rivers =

Member of the Parliament of England

Nizel Rivers (1614 – c 1695) was an English politician who sat in the House of Commons in 1660.

Rivers was the son of Sir John Rivers, 1st Baronet of Chafford, Westerham, Kent and hs wife Dorothy Potter, daughter of Thomas Potter of Wellstreet, Westerham, Kent. He was baptised at Westerham on 19 May 1614. He was educated at Westerham, and admitted to Christ's College, Cambridge on 10 May 1628. He was awarded BA in 1632.

In 1660, Rivers was elected Member of Parliament for Lewes in the Convention Parliament.

Rivers lived at Offham, Hamsey, near Lewes. He died at the age of 80 and was buried at Hamsey on 11 January 1695.

Rivers married Jane Colepeper widow of Sir Alexander Colepeper of Goudhurst, Kent and daughter of Ninian Burrell of Cuckfield, Sussex. They had no children and she died in 1668. He was the brother of James Rivers.
