= Richard Spencer (Royalist) =

English nobleman, gentleman, knight and politician

- Born: Richard Spencer; 1593
- Died: 1 November 1661 (aged 67–68)

Sir Richard Spencer (1593 − 1 November 1661) was an English nobleman, gentleman, knight, and politician who sat in the House of Commons from 1621 to 1629 and in 1661. He supported the Royalist cause in the English Civil War.

== Early life ==
Spencer was the son of Robert Spencer, 1st Baron Spencer of Wormleighton and his wife Margaret, daughter of Sir Francis Willoughby and Elizabeth Lyttelton. He was baptised on 21 October 1593. He was educated at Corpus Christi College, Oxford in 1609 and was awarded BA in 1612. His brothers were Sir Edward Spencer, Sir John Spencer, and William Spencer, 2nd Baron Spencer of Wormleighton.

== Parliamentary career ==
In 1621, Spencer was selected Member of Parliament for Northampton. He was a student of Gray's Inn in 1624. In 1624 and 1625 he was re-elected MP for Northampton. He became a gentleman of the bedchamber in 1626. He was re-elected MP for Northampton in 1626 and 1628 and sat until 1629 when King Charles decided to rule without parliament for eleven years.

== Post-parliament actions ==
He was a J.P. for Kent by 1636. Spencer stood for parliament for Kent for the Long Parliament in November 1640, but withdrew before the election took place. He was imprisoned twice by the Long Parliament for promoting the moderate Kentish petition of 1642. He was a commissioner of array for the King in 1642, stood security for loans amounting to £60,000 and helped to raise two regiments of horse, which he commanded at the Battle of Edgehill. He gave up his command in 1643 and was claimed the benefit of the Oxford Articles. He settled £40 a year on the minister of Orpington and was allowed to compound for a mere £300.

However he became involved in the canal schemes of William Sandys and his financial condition became precarious. In 1651 he obtained a pass to France for himself and his family and settled in Brussels. He returned to England in about 1653 and was imprisoned and forced to pay off his debts.

At the Restoration, Spencer petitioned unsuccessfully for positions which had been promised to him in reversion many years earlier. These included Provost of Eton and vice-treasurer of Ireland. He became JP and Deputy Lieutenant for Kent and commissioner for oyer and terminer on Home circuit in July 1660. By August 1660 he was colonel of militia for Kent. He became commissioner for assessment in August 1660, and commissioner for sewers in North Kent in September 1660.

He was nominated by the Duke of York as court candidate for Rye in 1661 and elected to the Cavalier Parliament for the constituency, taking his seat having been absent from the Commons for 32 years.

== Personal life and death ==
Spencer married Mary Sandys, daughter of Sir Edwin Sandys of Northbourne, Kent in 1628. They settled at Orpington, Kent, and had four sons and two daughters.

Spencer died later in 1661 at the age of 68 and was buried at Orpington.

Parliament of England
Preceded by Henry Yelverton; Francis Beale	Member of Parliament for Northampton; 1621–1629; With: Thomas Crewe 1621–1622; Christopher Sherland 1624–1629	Parliament suspended until 1640
Preceded by Herbert Morley; William Hay	Member of Parliament for Rye; 1621; With: Herbert Morley	Succeeded by Herbert Morley; Sir John Robinson
