= Robert Oxenbridge (died 1574) =

English MP and Constable of the Tower

Coat of Arms of R. Oxenbridg

Sir Robert Oxenbridge (1508–1574) was an English Member of Parliament and Constable of the Tower.

== Career ==
Robert Oxenbridge was the son of Sir Goddard Oxenbridge of Brede, Sussex, who was three times High Sheriff of Surrey and Sussex. Robert inherited the house at Brede from his cousin in 1550.

He was an Esquire of the Body by 1541. He was a Justice of the Peace for Sussex by 1541 until 1558, Constable of Pevensey Castle, Sussex from 1550 until his death and High Sheriff of Surrey and Sussex for 1551–52. He was knighted by 1553. He was also appointed a Lieutenant of the Tower of London in 1556 and Constable of the Tower in 1557–58.

He was elected MP for East Grinstead in March 1553 and elected Knight of the Shire (MP) for Sussex in April 1554, 1555 and 1558. He moved to Hampshire in 1558 where he bought Hurstbourne Priors, near Whitchurch and was appointed High Sheriff of Hampshire for 1567–68.

He died in 1574, leaving Hurstbourne to his wife and his other properties to be shared between her and his son.

== Marriages and issue ==
Oxenbridge married Alice Fogge, widow of Edward Scott (son of Sir William Scott), and daughter and co-heiress of Sir Thomas Fogge of Ash, Kent, sergeant porter of Calais during the reigns of Henry VII and Henry VIII, by whom he had a son and two daughters.

Their son, also named Robert, married Elizabeth Cocke, though some sources claim that it is Robert Oxenbridge snr who married her. As the latter predeceased his wife Alice, this is obviously incorrect.
