= John Babelake =

English politician

John Babelake (fl. 1387–1415), also known as John Wyndesore, was an English politician. He sat as MP for Sussex in November 1414.
