= John Hewett (chaplain) =

Reverend Dr. John Hewett (or Huett; September 1614 – buried 8 June 1658) was chaplain to Charles I and later executed for treason as a Royalist.

The son of clothworker Thomas Hewett, he was born in Eccles, Lancashire, and educated in nearby Bolton-le-Moors. He matriculated sizar at Pembroke College, Cambridge in 1633, and in 1643 he was awarded a degree of D.D. by Oxford University, where he served as a chaplain to Charles I. He then became chaplain to Montagu Bertie, 2nd Earl of Lindsey, at Havering in Essex, before moving to London, where he preached to larger congregations. He was openly loyal to the exiled Prince Charles (the future King Charles II), and was involved in the secret preparations for his return.

In April 1658 a fellow sympathiser, John Stapley, confessed to Cromwell that, thanks to Hewett, he had been offered funds to raise an army to support the return of Prince Charles. Hewett was arrested, along with Lord Mordaunt and Sir Henry Slingsby, and brought to trial, refusing to enter a plea of guilty or not guilty and claiming the right to trial by jury. The court, however, sentenced Hewett and Slingsby to be beheaded for treason (Mordaunt having been narrowly acquitted on a technicality) and three other less well-born conspirators to be hanged, drawn and quartered. The beheadings were carried out on Tower Hill. These events were depicted in a drama of 1660 called Cromwell's Conspiracie, in which Hewet's ghost haunts Cromwell's deathbed.

Hewett married twice: firstly Elizabeth, daughter of Robert Skinner of London, with whom he had three children; and secondly Mary, daughter of Robert Bertie, 1st Earl of Lindsey, with whom he had two daughters who died young. His eldest son John became a merchant in Barbados.
