= Mark Thomas (MP) =

Mark Thomas was an English politician who sat in the House of Commons in 1659.

Thomas was the son of Mark Thomas of Rye, Sussex. He was admitted at Emmanuel College, Cambridge on 27 May 1633. He migrated to Trinity College, Cambridge and was admitted at Middle Temple on 12 November 1634. In 1636 he was awarded BA. In 1659, Thomas was elected Member of Parliament for Rye in the Third Protectorate Parliament.

Parliament of England
Preceded by William Hay	Member of Parliament for Rye; 1659; With: William Hay	Succeeded by Not represented in Restored Rump
