= James Rivers (politician) =

English politician

James Rivers (1603 – 8 June 1641) was an English politician who sat in the House of Commons from 1640.

Rivers was the son of Sir John Rivers, 1st Baronet of Chafford, Westerham, Kent and his wife Dorothy Potter, daughter of Thomas Potter of Wellstreet, Westerham, Kent. He matriculated at Corpus Christi College, Oxford under entry dated 16 December 1616, aged 13 and was awarded BA on 3 July 1620. He was a leading puritan. In April 1640, he was elected member of parliament for Lewes for the Short Parliament. He was re-elected MP for Lewes for the Long Parliament in November 1640.

Rivers died in 1641 at the age of 38.

Parliament of England
Vacant Parliament suspended since 1629	Member of Parliament for Lewes; 1640; With: Anthony Stapley 1640; Herbert Morley 1640	Succeeded by Herbert Morley; Henry Shelley
