= Thomas Holt (Serjeant-at-Law) =

English lawyer and politician (1616–1686)

Sir Thomas Holt (1616 – 28 July 1686) was an English lawyer and politician who sat in the House of Commons in 1654 and 1656.

Holt was the son of Rowland Holt, merchant of London, and his wife Mary Bucknor, daughter of Thomas Bucknor of London. He matriculated at Magdalen Hall, Oxford on 23 November 1632, aged 16. He was called to the bar at Gray's Inn in 1648. He became recorder of Abingdon.

In 1654, Holt was elected Member of Parliament for Abingdon for the First Protectorate Parliament. He was re-elected MP for Abingdon in 1656 for the Second Protectorate Parliament.

Holt was a J.P. for Berkshire. He became a bencher of his Inn in 1671 and was appointed serjeant-at-law in 1677. He was knighted on 16 April 1679. In 1686 he became King's Serjeant.

Holt died at the age of 70 and was buried at St. James's, Clerkenwell.

Holt married Susan Peacock, daughter of John Peacock of Cumnor, Berkshire. They had children John who became Lord Chief Justice, Rowland, Mary, who married Edward Leman, son of Sir William Leman, 1st Baronet and Susan who married Francis Levett.

Parliament of England
Preceded by Not represented in Barebones Parliament	Member of Parliament for Abingdon; 1654–1656	Succeeded by Sir John Lenthall, 1st Baronet
