= John Eversfield =

Member of the Parliament of England

John Eversfield (c. 1624 – 22 May 1678) was an English politician who sat in the House of Commons from 1660 to 1661.

Eversfield was the son of Nicholas Eversfield of The Grove, Hollington. He was educated at Magdalen Hall, Oxford and entered Inner Temple in 1641.

Eversfield was Member of Parliament (MP) for Steyning from 1660 to 1661. In parliament he made no speeches and served on no committees. He was commissioner for sewers in West Sussex in 1660, an assessor for Sussex from 1663 and a J.P. from 1668.

Eversfield married firstly Hester Knight, daughter of John Knight of Westergate. She brought him the wealth to buy Charlton Court, but died in 1672. Their son Nicholas was MP for Bramber in 1679. Eversfield married secondly on 3 July 1673 Susan Foster widow of Thomas Foster of Iden and daughter of Francis Norman of Salehurst. His brother Anthony Eversfield was MP for Horsham, Edward Eversfield was MP for Bramber and Sir Thomas Eversfield was also an MP.

Eversfield died aged 54.

Parliament of England
Preceded by Sir Henry Goring, Bt; Sir John Fagg, Bt	Member of Parliament for Steyning; 1660–1661; With: Sir John Fagg, Bt	Succeeded by Sir Henry Goring, Bt; Sir John Fagg, Bt
