= Broyle Place =

Building in Ringmer, East Sussex, England

Coordinates: 50.8957°N 0.0997°E

Broyle Place is a historic house in Ringmer, Sussex, England. It is a Grade II listed Elizabethan manor house. In the 12th century, it belonged to Theobald, Archbishop of Canterbury. It has also been owned by Thomas Sackville, 1st Earl of Dorset and Sir Herbert Springet, 1st Baronet.
