= Sir George Parker, 2nd Baronet =

English politician

Sir George Parker, 2nd Baronet (c. 1673 – 14 May 1727), of Ratton, Sussex, was an English politician. He was a Member of Parliament (MP) for Sussex from 1705 to 1708 and again from 1710 to 1713.

He succeeded as second baronet on 30 November 1691. He died on 14 May 1727.

He married Mary Bagot (1672-1727) eldest daughter of Sir Walter Bagot, 3rd Baronet (1644-1704) of Blithfield, Staffordshire in 1692.

Parliament of England
Preceded by Sir Thomas Pelham, Bt; Henry Lumley	Member of Parliament for Sussex; 1705–1707; With: John Morley Trevor	Succeeded by Parliament of Great Britain
Parliament of Great Britain
Preceded by Parliament of Great Britain	Member of Parliament for Sussex; 1707–1708; With: John Morley Trevor	Succeeded by Sir Henry Peachey, Bt; Peter Gott
Preceded by Sir Henry Peachey, Bt; Peter Gott	Member of Parliament for Sussex; 1710–1713; With: Charles Eversfield	Succeeded by Henry Campion; John Fuller
Baronetage of England
Preceded by Robert Parker	Baronet (of Ratton); 1691–1727	Succeeded by Walter Parker
