= Richard Bannebury =

English politician (died c. 1439)

Richard Bannebury (died c. 1439), alias Richard Chamberlain, was an English politician. He sat as MP for Sussex in 1419.

Before May 1411, he married Mary (died 1420), the daughter of William Filoll and widow of Sir William Percy.
