= Sir Thomas Pelham, 1st Baronet =

English politician

Sir Thomas Pelham, 1st Baronet (died 2 December 1624) was an English politician.

He was the youngest son of Sir Nicholas Pelham of Laughton, East Sussex and his wife Anne Sackville, who was through her mother a first cousin of Anne Boleyn. He was educated at Lewes Grammar School (1557), Queens' College, Cambridge (1561) and studied law at the Inns of Court (1566). He succeeded his nephew Oliver Pelham as the owner of Laughton in 1585.

He was elected a member (MP) of the parliament of England for Lewes in 1584 and Sussex in 1586. He served as a justice of the peace for Sussex from c. 1583 and was appointed High Sheriff of Surrey and Sussex for 1589–90. He was a deputy-lieutenant of Sussex from 1601, and was created a baronet in 1611.

He married Mary, the daughter of Sir Thomas Walsingham of Chislehurst, Kent, with whom he had a son and daughter. His son Thomas succeeded him in the baronetcy in 1624, while his daughter Judith married Henry Carey, 1st Earl of Dover.

Parliament of England
| Preceded by Edward Bellingham; John Shurley | Member of Parliament for Lewes; 1584–1585; With: Richard Browne | Succeeded by Richard Browne; Francis Alford |
| Preceded by Robert Sackville; Thomas Shirley | Member of Parliament for Sussex; 1586–1587; With: Walter Covert | Succeeded by Sir Thomas Palmer; Henry Neville |
Baronetage of England
| New creation | Baronet (of Laughton); 1611–1624 | Succeeded by Thomas Pelham |
