= John Covert (by 1501–1558) =

English politician

Arms of Covert: Gules, a fess ermine between three martlets or

John Covert (by 1501–1558) was an English politician.

He was the eldest son of Richard Covert of Slaugham, Sussex.

Covert was elected a Member (MP) of the Parliament of England for New Shoreham in 1529 and Sussex in October 1553 and November 1554. He was High Sheriff of Surrey and Sussex for 1554–55.

He married twice: firstly Joan, the daughter and coheiress of Thomas Cooke of Rustington, with whom he had 2 sons and 2 daughters and secondly Anne, the daughter of William Beard of Cowfold.
