= Thomas Sherley =

English physician

- Born: 1638; London
- Died: 5 August 1678 (aged 39–40)
- Occupation: Physician

Thomas Sherley, or Shirley, (1638 – 5 August 1678) was an English physician.

== Biography ==
Sherley was the son of Sir Thomas Sherley of Wiston, Sussex, by his wife Anne, daughter of Sir George Blundell of Cardington, Bedfordshire. He was born in the parish of St. Margaret's, Westminster, and baptised on 15 October 1638. Sir Thomas Shirley, the adventurer, was his grandfather. He lived with his father in Magdalen College while Oxford was garrisoned by the king's troops, and was educated at Magdalen school. He afterwards went to France, studied physic, and obtained the degree of M.D. On his return he acquired a good practice, and was appointed physician in ordinary to Charles II. He was heir to his father's estate at Wiston, worth nearly 3,000l. a year; but it had been granted during the civil war to Sir John Fagg, 1st Baronet, and, although Sherley had recourse to law, the case was decided against him in chancery. He appealed to the House of Lords, but, Sir John Fagge being the member for Steyning in the House of Commons, the house maintained that he was entitled to exemption from lawsuits during session, and Sherley was ordered into the custody of the serjeant-at-arms on 12 May 1675 for bringing an appeal in the lords against a member of the lower house. The matter occasioned a dispute between the two houses, who were already embroiled over the case of Skinner and the East India Company. The difference was only terminated by the king proroguing parliament (Journals of House of Lords, vols. xii., xiii. passim; Journals of House of Commons, ix. 337 &c.). Disappointed by his ill success, Sherley sank into a morbid condition, and died on 5 August 1678. He was buried in the vault of St. Bride's, Fleet Street, London.

He was twice married: first to Hannah, daughter of John Harfleet of Fleet in Kent, by whom he had two daughters, Anne and Margaret. He married, secondly, Elizabeth, daughter of Captain Richard Baskett of Apps, Isle of Wight, on 5 June 1667, by whom he had Thomas, Richard, and Elizabeth (Chester, London Marriage Licenses, ed. Foster, p. 1219).

He was the author of ‘A Philosophical Essay, declaring the probable cause whence stones are produced in the outer world,’ 1672, 12mo; and of the following translations:

- Molimbrochius's ‘Cochlearia Curiosa,’ 1676, 8vo.
- ‘A Treatise of the Gout’ by Mayerne Turquet, 1676, 8vo.
- ‘Medicinal Councels’ by Mayerne Turquet, 1677, 8vo.
- ‘The Curious Distillatory,’ from the Latin of Johann Sigismund Elsholtz, 1677, 8vo.
