= John Price (MP for Cardiff) =

Welsh politician

John Price was a Welsh politician who sat in the House of Commons between 1654 and 1659.

Price was the only son of John Price of Gellihir. He was a member of the county committee of Glamorgan in 1645 and was Assessment Commissioner for Glamorgan in February 1647. In 1647 he was High Sheriff of Glamorgan. He became militia commissioner for Glamorgan, Monmouthshire, Breconshire and Gloucestershire on 21 April 1648. On 25 June 1651, he was appointed a member of the High Court of Justice.

In 1654, Price was elected Member of Parliament for Cardiff in the First Protectorate Parliament. He was one of twelve capital burgesses of Swansea under charter of 26 February 1655. In 1656 he was re-elected MP for Cardiff in the Second Protectorate Parliament. He was appointed a commissioner for carrying out the Act for safeguarding Oliver Cromwell on 4 May 1658. In 1659 he was re-elected MP for Cardiff in the Third Protectorate Parliament.

Price married as his first wife Cecilia Arney daughter of Rice Arney of Monmouthshire. He was brother in law of Philip Jones of Fonmon.

Parliament of England
Preceded by Not represented in Barebones Parliament	Member of Parliament for Cardiff; 1654–1659	Succeeded by Algernon Sidney
