= Sir Henry Goring, 2nd Baronet =

English barrister and politician

Sir Henry Goring, 2nd Baronet (1 May 1622 – 3 April 1702) was an English barrister and politician.

== Early life ==
Goring was the son of Henry Goring and Mary, daughter of Sir Thomas Eversfield, High Sheriff of Sussex. His grandfather had acquired the manor of Highden, Washington, West Sussex in 1610 and Goring inherited it on his father's death in 1655.

== Career ==
Goring sat as Member of Parliament for Sussex from 1660 to 1661 and for Steyning in 1660 and again from 1661 to 1679. In 1678 Sir James Bowyer surrendered his patent of baronetcy and secured a new patent with a remainder to Goring, who succeeded to the title with the precedency of the original patent two years later.

== Personal life ==
Goring married Frances (d. 1694), daughter of Sir Edward Bishopp and granddaughter of Nicholas Tufton, 1st Earl of Thanet in 1642.

Goring died on 3 April 1702. He was succeeded in the baronetcy by his grandson, Charles (d. 1713).

Parliament of England
Steyning was not represented in the restored Rump	Member of Parliament for Steyning; 1660; With: Sir John Fagg, Bt	Succeeded by John Eversfield; Sir John Fagg, Bt
Unknown	Member of Parliament for Sussex; 1660–1661; With: Sir John Pelham, Bt	Succeeded by Sir John Pelham, Bt; John Ashburnham
Preceded by John Eversfield; Sir John Fagg, Bt	Member of Parliament for Steyning; 1661–1679; With: Sir John Fagg, Bt	Succeeded by John Tufton; Sir John Fagg, Bt
Baronetage of England
Preceded by James Bowyer	Baronet (of Highden); 1658–1702	Succeeded by Charles Goring
