= Sussex (constituency) =

Parliamentary constituency in the United Kingdom, 1801–1832

- Former county constituency for the House of Commons
- County: Sussex

1290–1832
- Seats: Two
- Replaced by: East Sussex and West Sussex

Sussex was a constituency of the House of Commons of the Parliament of England then of the Parliament of Great Britain from 1707 to 1800 and of the Parliament of the United Kingdom from 1801 to 1832. It was represented by two Knights of the Shire, elected by the bloc vote system.

Under the Reform Act 1832 the constituency was split into two two-member divisions, for Parliamentary purposes, at the 1832 general election. The county was then represented by the East Sussex and West Sussex divisions.

== Boundaries ==
The constituency comprised the whole historic county of Sussex.

Sussex contained nine boroughs for most of its existence. These were: Arundel, Bramber, Chichester, East Grinstead, Horsham, Lewes, Midhurst, New Shoreham and Steyning; and four Cinque Ports: Hastings, Rye, Seaford and Winchelsea. Each of these areas also elected two MPs in their own right and they were not excluded from the county constituency. Owning property within the boroughs or ports could confer a vote at the county election.

== Members of Parliament ==
Two Members

=== 1290–1660 ===
Parliament	First member	Second member
1334	Roger Hussey	
1344	Roger Hussey	
1351	Andrew Peverell	
1353	Andrew Peverell	
1356	Andrew Peverell	
1361	Andrew Peverell	
1366	Andrew Peverell	
1373	Andrew Peverell	
1377 (Oct)	Nicholas Wilcombe	
1378	Sir Edmund FitzHerbert	
1380 (Nov)	Sir William Waleys	
1381	Sir Edmund FitzHerbert	
1382 (May)	Sir Edmund FitzHerbert	
1382 (Oct)	Sir William Waleys	Sir Edmund FitzHerbert
1383 (Feb)	Sir William Waleys	
1386	Sir Edmund FitzHerbert	Sir Edward Dallingridge
1388 (Feb)	Sir William Waleys	Sir Edward Dallingridge
1388 (Sep)	Nicholas Wilcombe	Robert Ore
1390 (Jan)	Sir William Percy	Thomas Jardyn
1390 (Nov)	Sir William Percy	Sir William Waleys
1391	Sir William Percy	Robert Tauk
1393	Sir William Percy	John Broke
1394	Sir William Percy	Sir Thomas Sackville II
1395	Hugh Quecche	Sir Thomas Sackville
1397 (Jan)	Sir William Percy	John Ashburnham
1397 (Sep)	Sir Thomas Sackville II	John Ashburnham
1399	John Pelham	John Preston
1401	Sir John Pelham	Sir Henry Hussey
1402	Sir John Dallingridge	Sir Henry Hussey
1404 (Jan)	Sir John Pelham	Robert Lewknor
1404 (Oct)	Sir John Dallingridge	Sir John Pelham
1406	Sir John Dallingridge	Sir John Pelham
1407	Sir John Dallingridge	Sir John Pelham
1410		
1411		
1413 (Feb)		
1413 (May)	Richard Wayville	Richard Wakehurst
1414 (Apr)	William Bramshott	Thomas St. Cler
1414 (Nov)	Richard Wayville	John Babelake
1415	Richard Stucley	William Weston II
1416 (Mar)	Richard Stucley	Sir Roger Fiennes
1416 (Oct)		
1417	John Halle	Richard Stucley
1419	Richard Bannebury	Richard Bitterley
1420	William Ryman	Ralph Rademylde
1421 (May)	William Ryman	John Halle
1421 (Dec)	Ralph Rademylde	Richard Bitterley
1442	Sir Roger Fiennes	
1445	Sir Roger Fiennes	
1449	John Wood	
1450	Robert Poynings	
1456	Nicholas Hussey	
1483	John Wood	
1491	Sir David Owen	
1495	Edmund Dudley	
1510–1523	No names known	
1529	Sir John Gage	Sir Richard Shirley
1536		
1539	Sir John Gage	Sir William Goring
1542	?Sir John Gage	?
1545	?Sir John Gage	?
1547	Sir William Goring	John Palmer
1553 (Mar)	?Sir Richard Sackville	?
1553 (Oct)	John Caryll	John Covert
1554 (Apr)	Sir Robert Oxenbridge	Sir Thomas Palmer
1554 (Nov)	John Covert	John Ashburnham II
1555	Sir Robert Oxenbridge	John Caryll
1558	Sir Nicholas Pelham	Sir Robert Oxenbridge
1559 (Jan)	Sir Richard Sackville	John Caryll
1562–3	Sir Richard Sackville, died and replaced 1566 by John Apsley	William Dawtrey
1571	John Pelham	Thomas Palmer
1572	John Jeffrey, died and replaced Jan 1581 by Walter Covert	Thomas Shirley
1584	Robert Sackville	Sir Thomas Shirley
1586	Walter Covert	Thomas Pelham
1588 (Oct)	Sir Thomas Palmer	Henry Neville
1593	Robert Sackville	Sir Thomas Shirley
1597 (Sep)	Robert Sackville	Sir Nicholas Parker
1601	Robert Sackville	Charles Howard
1604	Robert Sackville	Charles Howard
1609	Henry Carey	Charles Howard
1614	Sir Walter Covert	Sampson Lennard
1621	Sir Edward Sackville	Christopher Neville
1624	Algernon Lord Peircy	Thomas Pelham
1625	Sir Thomas Pelham, 2nd Baronet	Sir John Shurley
1626	Sir Walter Covert	Sir Alexander Temple
1628	Sir William Goring, 1st Baronet	Richard Lewknor
1629–1640	No Parliaments summoned	
1640 (Apr)	Sir Thomas Pelham Bt	Anthony Stapley
1640 (Nov)	Sir Thomas Pelham Bt	Anthony Stapley
1645	Sir Thomas Pelham Bt	Anthony Stapley
1648	Anthony Stapley	One seat only
1653	Anthony Stapley	William Spence; Nathaniel Studeley
1654	Herbert Morley	Sir Thomas Pelham, 2nd Baronet; Anthony Stapley; John Stapley; John Fagg; William Hay; John Pelham; Francis Lord Dacres; Herbert Springet
1656	Herbert Morley	John Pelham; John Fagg; John Stapley; Anthony Shirley; George Courthope; Sir Thomas Rivers, 2nd Baronet; Sir Thomas Parker; Samuel Gott
1659	Herbert Morley	John Fagg

=== 1660–1832 ===
Year	First member	First party	Second member	Second party
1660	Sir John Pelham, Bt		Henry Goring	
1661	Sir John Pelham, Bt		John Ashburnham	
1667	Sir John Pelham, Bt		Sir William Morley	
February 1679	Sir John Pelham, Bt		John Lewknor	
August 1679	Sir John Pelham, Bt		Sir Nicholas Pelham	
1681	Sir William Thomas, Bt		Sir John Fagg, Bt	
1685	Sir Henry Goring, Bt		Sir Thomas Dyke, Bt	
1689	Sir John Pelham, Bt		Sir William Thomas, Bt	
1698	Robert Orme		Sir William Thomas, Bt	
January 1701	Henry Lumley		John Miller	
December 1701	Sir William Thomas, Bt		Sir Henry Peachey	Whig
1702	Sir Thomas Pelham, Bt	Whig	Henry Lumley	
1705	John Morley Trevor		Sir George Parker, Bt	
1708	Sir Henry Peachey, Bt	Whig	Peter Gott	
1710	Charles Eversfield	Tory	Sir George Parker, Bt	
1713	Henry Campion		John Fuller	
1715	James Butler		Hon. Spencer Compton	Whig
1722	Hon. Henry Pelham	Whig	Hon. Spencer Compton	Whig
1728	Hon. Henry Pelham	Whig	James Butler	Whig
1742	Hon. Henry Pelham	Whig	Earl of Middlesex	
1747	Hon. Henry Pelham	Whig	John Butler	
1754	Thomas Pelham	Whig	John Butler	
1767	Thomas Pelham	Whig	Lord George Henry Lennox	Rockingham Whig
1768	Richard Harcourt		Lord George Henry Lennox	Rockingham Whig
1774	Sir Thomas Spencer Wilson		Lord George Henry Lennox	Rockingham Whig
1780	Thomas Pelham	Whig	Lord George Henry Lennox	Rockingham Whig
1790	Thomas Pelham	Whig	Charles Lennox	Tory
1795	Thomas Pelham	Pittite	Charles Lennox	Tory
1801	John 'Mad Jack' Fuller	Tory	Charles Lennox	Tory
1807	John 'Mad Jack' Fuller	Tory	Charles William Wyndham	
1812	Sir Godfrey Webster, Bt	Tory	Walter Burrell	Tory
1820	Edward Jeremiah Curteis		Walter Burrell	Tory
1830	Herbert Barrett Curteis	Tory	Walter Burrell	Tory
1831	Herbert Barrett Curteis	Tory	Lord John Lennox	Whig
1832	Constituency divided into East and West Sussex.			

== Elections ==
The county franchise, from 1430, was held by the adult male owners of freehold land valued at 40 shillings or more. Each elector had as many votes as there were seats to be filled. Votes had to be cast by a spoken declaration, in public, at the hustings, which took place in the county town of Chichester. The expense and difficulty of voting at only one location in the county, together with the lack of a secret ballot contributed to the corruption and intimidation of electors, which was widespread in the unreformed British political system.

The expense, to candidates, of contested elections encouraged the leading families of the county to agree on the candidates to be returned unopposed whenever possible. Contested county elections were therefore unusual.

== See also ==
- List of former United Kingdom Parliament constituencies
- Unreformed House of Commons

Parliament of the United Kingdom
Vacant since 1742 Title last held by King's Lynn	Constituency represented by the prime minister 1743–1754	Vacant until 1763 Title next held by Buckingham
