= George Smith (died 1658) =

English lawyer

George Smith or Smyth was an English lawyer.

== Biography ==
The son of John Smith, of Kirdford, Sussex, he matriculated at Trinity College, Oxford on 29 January 1619, age sixteen. In 1633 he was a barrister-at-law of Gray's Inn. He was appointed a commissioner for the administration of justice in civil matters for Scotland in 1652, and sat in the Protectorate Parliament for the sheriffdom of Midlothian from 1654 to 1655, and for the sheriffdom of Dumfries from 1656 until his death on circuit at Inverness, on 26 September 1658.

Parliament of England
Preceded by Sir James Hope, Alexander Bredy, John Swinton, William Lockhart, Alexander Jeffries as MPs for Scotland	Member of Parliament for Midlothian; 1654–1655	Succeeded by Samuel Desborough
Preceded by The Earl of Hartfell	Member of Parliament for Dumfries; 1656–1658	Commonwealth Parliament abolished
