= Rivers baronets =

Extinct baronetcy in the Baronetage of England

Escutcheon of the Rivers baronets

The Rivers, later Rivers-Gay, later Rivers Baronetcy, of Chafford in the County of Kent, was a title in the Baronetage of England. It was created on 19 July 1621 for John Rivers. He was a grandson of Sir John Rivers, Lord Mayor of London between 1573 and 1574. The sixth Baronet assumed the additional surname of Gay in circa 1760. This surname was also used by the seventh Baronet but not by any subsequent Baronets. The title became extinct on the death of the eleventh Baronet in 1870.

The records of Broxham manor (Westerham) show that Sir John Rivers, 3rd baronet, was dead in 1678.

== Rivers, later Rivers-Gay, later Rivers baronets, of Chafford (1621) ==
- Sir John Rivers, 1st Baronet (c. 1579–c. 1651)
- Sir Thomas Rivers, 2nd Baronet (died 1657)
- Sir John Rivers, 3rd Baronet (died c. 1679)
- Sir George Rivers, 4th Baronet (1665–1734)
- Sir John Rivers, 5th Baronet (c. 1718–1743)
- Sir Peter Rivers-Gay, 6th Baronet (c. 1721–1790)
- Sir Thomas Rivers-Gay, 7th Baronet (c. 1770–1805)
- Sir James Rivers, 8th Baronet (1772–1805)
- Sir Henry Rivers, 9th Baronet (c. 1779–1851)
- Sir James Francis Rivers, 10th Baronet (1822–1869)
- Sir Henry Chandos Rivers, 11th Baronet (1834–1870)
