= Sir John Fagg, 1st Baronet =

English politician

Sir John Fagg Bt

Member of the England Parliament for Rye
- In office 1644–1645 Serving with William Hay
- Preceded by: William Hay
- Succeeded by: Not represented in Barebone's Parliament

Member of the England Parliament for Sussex
- In office 1654–1659 Serving with: Herbert Morley; Thomas Pelham; Anthony Stapley; John Stapley; William Hay; John Pelham; Francis Lord Dacres; Herbert Springet
- Preceded by: Anthony Stapley; William Spence; Nathaniel Studeley
- Succeeded by: Not represented in the restored Rump Parliament

Member of the England Parliament for Steyning
- In office 1660–1701 Serving with: Henry Goring, Bt 1660, 1661–1679; John Eversfield 1660–1661; John Tufton 1679–1681; Philip Gell 1681; James Morton 1681–1685, 1685–1690; Henry Goring 1685; Robert Fagg 1690–1695; Edward Hungerford 1695–1701
- Preceded by: Not represented in the restored Rump Parliament
- Succeeded by: Edward Hungerford; Robert Fagg

Member of the England Parliament for Sussex
- In office 1681–1681 Serving with William Thomas
- Preceded by: John Pelham; Nicholas Pelham
- Succeeded by: Henry Goring, Bt; Thomas Dyke

Personal details
- Born: 4 October 1627
- Died: 18 January 1701 (aged 73)
- Children: Sir Robert Fagg, 2nd Baronet

Sir John Fagg, 1st Baronet (4 October 1627 – 18 January 1701) was an English politician who sat in the House of Commons of England at various times between 1645 and 1701. During the Civil War, he fought on the Parliamentarian side as a colonel in the New Model Army.

== Life ==
Fagg was the son of John Fagg of Rye, in Sussex, and his wife Elizabeth Hudson (or Hodgson). He was educated at Emmanuel College, Cambridge, and then entered Gray's Inn.

Fagg sat as a Member of Parliament for Rye in the Long Parliament from 1645 to 1653. He was appointed one of the commissioners for the Sussex Militia in 1648. In 1649, he purchased the manor of Wiston from John Tufton, 2nd Earl of Thanet.

From 1654 to 1659, Fagg was MP for Sussex in the First, Second and Third Protectorate Parliaments. After the death of Oliver Cromwell, Fagg was commissioned to raise a regiment of foot by the Rump Parliament in 1659 and was taken prisoner by forces loyal to the military regime when he tried to secure Portsmouth for Parliament.

In 1660, Fagg represented Steyning in the Convention Parliament, the parliament which made the arrangements for the Restoration of 1660. When this occurred, Fagg was pardoned for his activities in the Civil War and Interregnum, and on 11 December of the same year he was created a baronet, of Wiston in the County of Sussex.

Fagg again represented Steyning throughout the long Cavalier Parliament of 1661–1679 and continued to do so until his death in 1701. In 1681 he was also returned for Sussex, but the parliament which came to be known as the Oxford Parliament lasted only a few days and was dissolved before he had chosen which constituency to represent.

In 1675, Fagg was at the centre of an intense storm concerning parliamentary privilege, when a Dr Thomas Shirley sought to bring an action against him in the House of Lords concerning a property matter. On 4 November 1675, the Lords resolved to fix 20 November as the date for the matter to be heard. Five days later, in reply, the Commons resolved that the action was in breach of their privilege and that Fagg should make no defense of it. On 17 November, the Lords appointed three counsel to plead Shirley's case. On the 18th, the Commons resolved to seek a Conference with the Lords "for avoiding the occasions of reviving the differences between the two Houses", and a committee was appointed for the purpose. The Lords accepted the invitation. On 20 November, the Commons ordered that Shirley be taken into custody by the Serjeant-at-Arms, for breach of their privilege, and also ordered the posting of notices warning of legal action against anyone pleading Shirley's case. That day, Shirley appeared in person in the Lords, with Richard Wallop, one of his counsel, who asked to be excused, but the Lords ordered Wallop to represent Shirley, with the hearing deferred until the 22nd. Later that day, a motion in the Lords that the King be prayed to resolve the matter by dissolving parliament was lost by two votes, 48 in favour and 50 against. However, two days later, on the day fixed for the new hearing, the King prorogued both Houses of Parliament for several months, to bring the dispute to an end.

In the 1690s, Fagg was breeding bullocks for the London market on the Wiston manor home farm. Daniel Defoe visited Fagg at Wiston in 1697, as recollected in his Tour through England and Wales in 1720.

"Near Steyning, the famous Sir John Fagg had a noble ancient seat, now possessed with a vast estate by his grandson, Sir Robert Fagg; but I mention the ancient gentleman on this occasion, that being entertained at his house, in the year 1697, he showed me in his park four bullocks of his own breeding, and of his own feeding, of so prodigious a size, and so excessively overgrown by fat, that I never saw any thing like them".

Fagg was still Colonel of one of the Sussex Militia regiments in 1697.

== Death ==
Fagg died on 18 January 1701, aged 73. At the time of his death, he was the Father of the House of Commons.

== Family ==
Fagg married first Mary Morley and with her had sixteen children, of whom only five lived long enough to be married. After her death, he married second Anne, daughter of Philip Weston of Newbury in Berkshire and widow of Thomas Henshaw of Billingshurst in Sussex. He was succeeded by Sir Robert Fagge, 2nd Baronet, his eldest surviving son.

Fagg was an acquaintance of William Penn and he may have been a distant relative.

In 1702 a large tract of undeveloped land owned by the Penn family in Chester County, Pennsylvania, was named Faggs Manor in his honor. The unincorporated hamlet of Faggs Manor, Pennsylvania still carries the name.

Parliament of England
Preceded by William Hay seat vacant	Member of Parliament for Rye; 1644–1645; With: William Hay	Rye was unrepresented in the Barebones Parliament
Preceded by Anthony Stapley; William Spence; Nathaniel Studeley	Member of Parliament for Sussex; 1654–1659; With: Herbert Morley; Sir Thomas Pelham Bt. Anthony Stapley; John Stapley; William Hay; Sir John Pelham, 3rd Baronet; Francis Lord Dacres; Sir Herbert Springet, 1st Baronet	Not represented in restored Rump
Vacant Steyning was not represented in the restored Rump	Member of Parliament for Steyning; 1660–1701; With: Henry Goring 1660, 1661–1679; John Eversfield 1660–1661; John Tufton 1679–1681; Philip Gell 1681; James Morton 1681–1685, 1685–1690; Henry Goring 1685; Robert Fagg 1690–1695; Edward Hungerford 1695–1701	Succeeded by Edward Hungerford; Sir Robert Fagg, Bt
Preceded by Sir John Pelham, Bt; Nicholas Pelham	Member of Parliament for Sussex; 1681–1681; With: Sir William Thomas, Bt	Succeeded by Sir Henry Goring, Bt; Sir Thomas Dyke, Bt
Unknown	Father of the House; 1701	Succeeded by Thomas Turgis
Baronetage of England
New creation	Baronet (of Wiston); 1660–1701	Succeeded by Robert Fagg
