= Original Peart =

British Politician

Mayor of Lincoln
- In office 1650–1651

Member of Parliament for Lincoln
- In office 1654–1654 Serving with William Marshall
- Preceded by: Thomas Grantham, Thomas Lister
- Succeeded by: Humphrey Walcot
- In office 1656–1656 Serving with Humphrey Walcot
- Preceded by: William Marshall
- Succeeded by: Robert Marshal, Thomas Meres

Personal details
- Born: before 1612
- Died: 1657
- Children: Robert Peart, Original Peart

Original Peart (born before 1612 – 1657) was an English alderman. He served as Mayor of Lincoln from 1650 to 1651, and a Member of Parliament for Lincoln in 1654 and 1656.

Original Peart was born before 1612, probably around 1608. He became City Chamberlain on 29 September 1633.

Original Peart is listed as a Major Captain in Edward Rossiter's 5th Regiment of Horse in the New Model Army in April–May 1645 and December 1646.
