= Sir William Thomas, 1st Baronet =

English politician

Sir William Thomas, 1st Baronet (29 July 1641 – 18 November 1706) was an English politician who sat in the House of Commons from 1661 to 1679, and from 1680 to 1706.

Thomas was created Baronet of Folkington in the County of Sussex, created in the Baronetage of England on 23 July 1660. He was Member of Parliament for Seaford from 1661 to 1681. and for Sussex in 1681. He was Colonel of one of the regiments of Sussex Militia in 1697.

Thomas married Barbara Springet, daughter of Sir Herbert Springet, 1st Baronet MP for New Shoreham and Sussex. The title became extinct on his death aged 65 in 1706.

Baronetage of England
New creation	Baronet (of Folkington); 1660–1706	Extinct
