= Samuel Gott =

English politician

Samuel Gott (20 January 1614 – 18 December 1671) was an English politician who sat in the House of Commons of England between 1645 and 1648 and between 1660 and 1661.

== Life ==
Gott was the eldest son of Samuel Gott, Ironmonger of London and his wife Elizabeth Russell. He was educated at Merchant Taylors' School from 1626 to 1629. He was a student at St Catharine's College, Cambridge in 1630 and was awarded BA in 1633. He entered Gray's Inn in 1633 and was called to the bar in 1640. He moved to Sussex on his marriage.

In April 1645, Gott was elected Member of Parliament for Winchelsea in the Long Parliament until he was excluded in Pride's Purge in 1648. He was an ancient on his Inn in 1658. He was appointed High Sheriff of Sussex for 1658–59 and in April 1660 he was elected MP for Winchelsea in the Convention Parliament. In June 1661 Gott is said to have reported treasonable words to the Privy Council in an attempt to find favour with the Crown.

In 1663 Gott suffered a severe assault. John Machell of Hills, Horsham (later M.P. for Horsham, Sussex) had courted Gott's sister, but Gott (described as Barrister of Gray's Inn, and Justice of the Peace for Sussex) would not consent to the match. Machell called him to an ale-house, where he and his relative Isaac Tully were waiting for him. When he arrived, Tully went out of the room to prevent anyone assisting, and Machell beat Gott so badly he broke his arm. They were indicted and convicted and sentenced to fines of £1000 and £500 respectively. In this matter King Charles II wrote to his Chief Justice Sir Robert Hyde and others wishing them to levy these fines in full rigour by way of example.

Gott wrote several religious works, including (so it is claimed) the Nova Solyma which was at one time attributed to John Milton. He died aged 57.

On his death he was buried at Battle. He had married Joan, the daughter and coheiress of Peter Farnden of Sedlescombe, Sussex, and had a son and two daughters. His son and heir Peter became an MP and a director of the Bank of England.

== Writings ==
- An Essay of the True Happiness of Man Explicated & Illustrated (Underhill, 1650)
- The Divine History of the Genesis of the World (London: Printed by E.C. et A.C. for Henry Eversden, 1670)

=== Attributed ===
- Nova Solyma, sive Institutio Christiani (1648, 1649) (New Jerusalem, or the Christian Institution)
  - Translation by Walter Begley, Full text (Internet Archive) Part 1
  - Translation by Walter Begley, Full text (Internet Archive) Part 2

Parliament of England
Vacant	Member of Parliament for Winchelsea; 1645–1648; With: Sir Henry Oxenden, Bt	Not represented in the restored Rump
Vacant Not represented in the restored Rump Title last held by Robert Fowle; John Busbridge	Member of Parliament for Winchelsea; 1660–1661; With: William Howard	Succeeded by Francis Finch; Sir Nicholas Crisp
