= William Hay (died 1664) =

English politician

William Hay (December 1594 – 26 December 1664) was an English politician who sat in the House of Commons at various times between 1641 and 1660.

In 1641, Hay was elected Member of Parliament for Rye in the Long Parliament. He was re-elected MP for Rye in the Second Protectorate Parliament in 1656 and in the Third Protectorate Parliament in 1659. In 1660 he was re-elected MP for Rye in the Convention Parliament.

Hay died at the age of 70.

Parliament of England
Preceded by Sir John Jacob, 1st Baronet; John White	Member of Parliament for Rye; 1641–1653; With: John White 141; John Fagg	Succeeded by Not represented in Barebones Parliament
Preceded by Herbert Morley	Member of Parliament for Rye; 1655–1659; With: Mark Thomas 1659	Succeeded by Not represented in restored Rump
Preceded by Not represented in restored Rump	Member of Parliament for Rye; 1660; With: Herbert Morley	Succeeded by Herbert Morley; Richard Spencer
