= John Stapley =

English politician

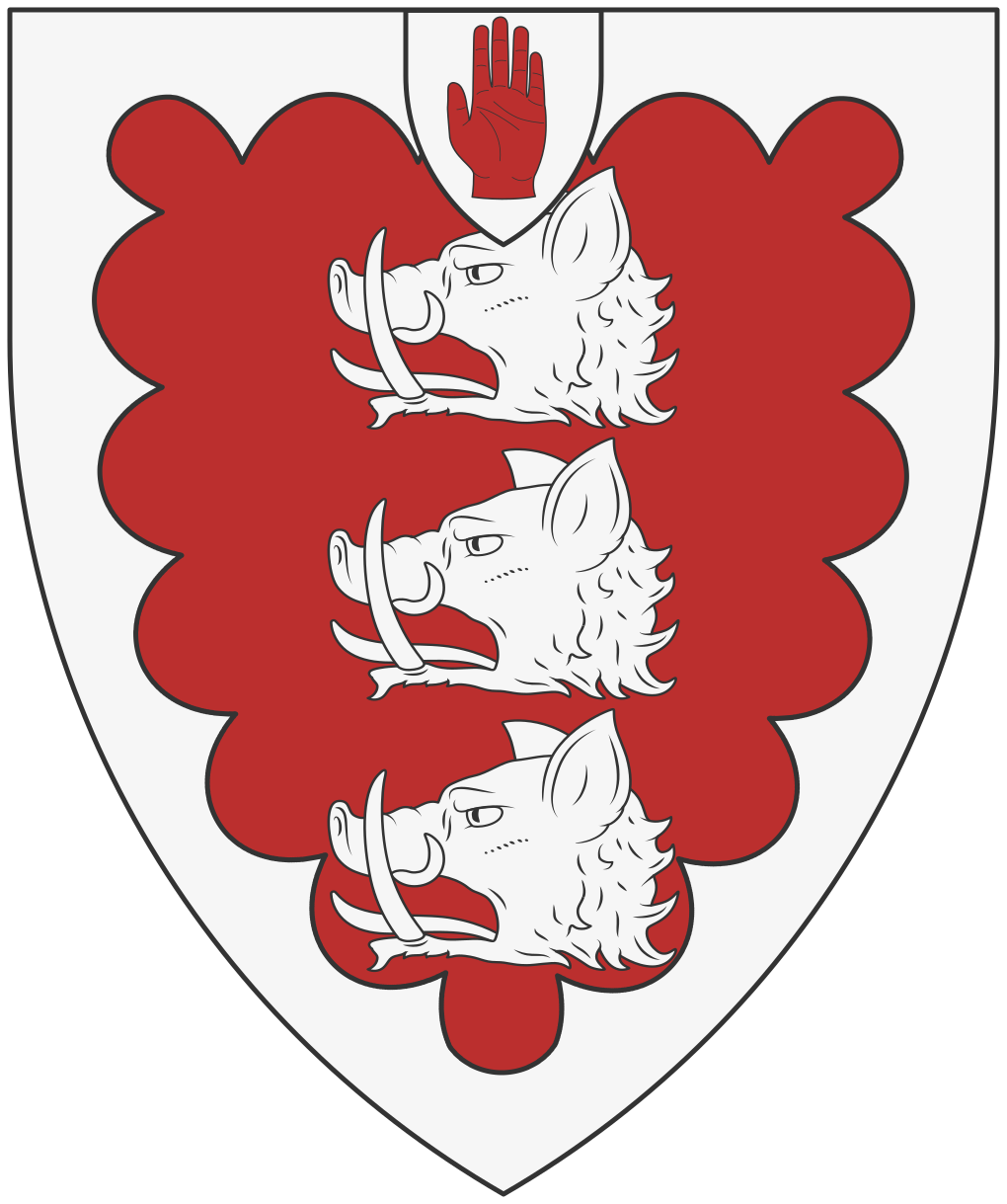
The arms of SSir John Stapley, 1st Baronet of Patcham

Sir John Stapley, 1st Baronet of Patcham (1628–1701) was an English politician who sat in the House of Commons at various times between 1654 and 1679. He was a Royalist who plotted with members of the Sealed Knot to overthrow the Protector Oliver Cromwell and restore Charles II of England to the throne, but when questioned by Cromwellians he disclosed the plot and betrayed the other members. After the Restoration, he was created a baronet on 28 July 1660.

== Biography ==
Stapley was the second but eldest surviving son, of Anthony Stapley of Patcham and his wife Ann Goring, daughter of George Goring of Danny, and sister of George, Lord Goring. He was baptised at Patcham on 29 June 1628. His father was one of the Regicides of Charles I of England and member of the Council of State under the Commonwealth

In 1654, Stapley was elected Member of Parliament for Sussex in the First Protectorate Parliament. In January 1656 he was appointed Deputy Lieutenant of Sussex. He was re-elected MP for Sussex in 1656 for the Second Protectorate Parliament.

In 1657 Stapley, abandoned the political views of his father and became entangled in a plot for the return of Charles II. At the house of his grandmother, Lady Champion, he had come under the influence of Dr. John Hewett and Lord Mordaunt. Ostensibly with a view to "the expiation of his father's crime", he professed himself anxious to "venture his life and his fortune for his majesty's restoration". In June 1657, through the instrumentality of Hewett, he had received from the exiled king a commission for the raising of a troop of horse and six colonels' commissions, to be distributed at his discretion. His interest in the county was considered to be great, and his promises of support to the royalist party were confident. Doubts were, however, thrown upon his ability to carry out all his plans. Through the treachery of a subordinate he fell into the hands of Cromwell in the spring of 1658, when he disclosed such particulars of the plot as led to the arrest of Hewett, Mordaunt, and Sir Henry Slingsby. Cromwell, however, dismissed him with a reproof, presumably on account of his friendship with his father. Stapley appeared as a witness against Mordaunt at his trial on 2 July 1658, but, according to Clarendon, answered "in so disorderly and confused a manner that it appeared that he had much rather not have said it". His younger brother Anthony was also concerned in the plot, and made full disclosures when examined by Colonel William Goffe and Henry Scobell in April 1658.

In 1660, Stapley was elected MP Lewes in the Convention Parliament. At the Restoration Stapley contrived to win the king's favour, and was created a baronet on 28 July 1660. In 1661 he was re-elected MP for Lewes in the Cavalier Parliament. Subsequently, he appears to have retired into private life in Sussex.

Stapley died in 1701, when the baronetcy became extinct.

== Family ==
Stapley married Mary Springett (born 1634), eldest daughter and coheiress of Sir Herbert Springett of Broyle Place at Ringmer in Sussex, by whom he had two sons, who predeceased him, and several daughters. His widow lived until 1708.

== Notes ==
Baronetage of England
New creation	Baronet (of Patcham); 1660–1701	Extinct
