= Anthony Stapley =

English politician and regicide (1590–1655)

Anthony Stapley JP
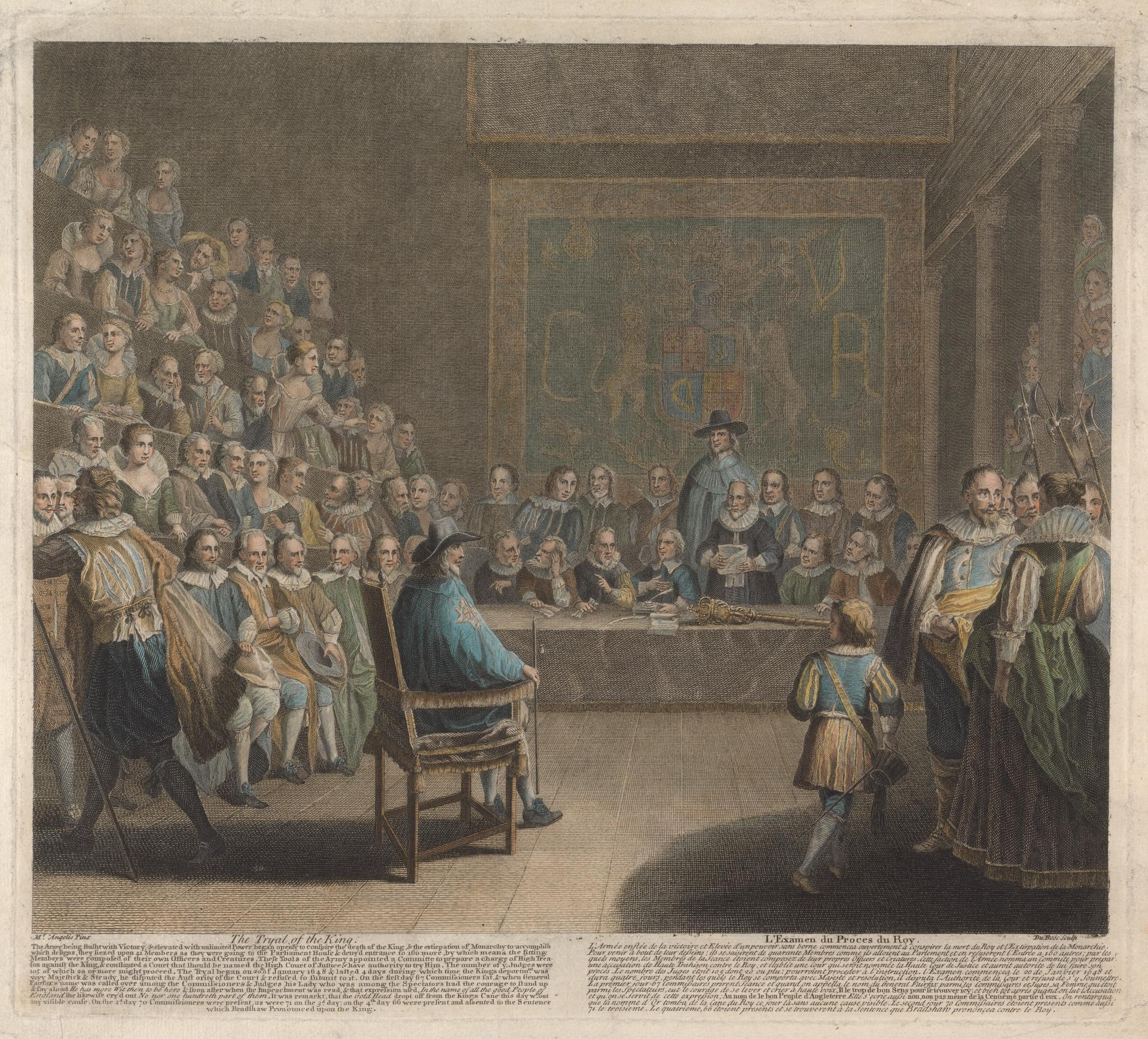
- The Trial of Charles I by Claude du Bosc; Stapley was one of the judges

Vice Admiral of Sussex
- In office 1651–1655

Council of State
- In office 1649–1653

Parliamentarian Governor of Chichester
- In office December 1642 – May 1645

Member of Parliament for Sussex
- In office 1640–1655

Member of Parliament for Lewes
- In office 1628–1629

Member of Parliament for New Shoreham
- In office 1624–1625

Personal details
- Born: 30 August 1590 (baptised) Framfield, East Sussex
- Died: 31 January 1655 (buried) Patcham Place, East Sussex
- Resting place: All Saints Church, Patcham
- Spouse(s): (1) Ann Goring (1614-1637) (2) Anne Harding (?-1654)
- Children: (1) Sir John Stapley (1628-1701); Anthony Stapley (1630-1671)
- Parent(s): Anthony Stapley (c. 1537-1606); Ann Thatcher (1555-?)
- Education: Christ's College, Cambridge;

Military service
- Rank: Colonel
- Battles/wars: First English Civil War; Siege of Chichester

Anthony Stapley (30 August 1590 – 31 January 1655) was a landowner and Member of Parliament from Sussex. A Puritan and supporter of Parliament during the War of the Three Kingdoms, he was one of the regicides who approved the Execution of Charles I in 1649. Dying in January 1655 he thus escaped prosecution by Charles II following the 1660 Stuart Restoration.

== Personal details ==
Anthony Stapley was baptised at Framfield in East Sussex on 30 August 1590, son of Anthony Stapley (c. 1537-1606) and his third wife, Ann Thatcher (1555-?). He married Ann Goring in 1614 having four children with her; out of them, Sir John Stapley (1628–1701), and Anthony (1630-1671) were the only two to survive into adulthood. Sometime after Goring died in 1637, he married again, this time to Anne Harding. They had no children before her death in 1654.

== Career ==
Although his family had lived in Sussex since the 15th century, Stapley was the first to play a significant role in national politics. A minor when his father died in 1606, he was placed in the legal care of his mothers' Catholic family, but his education entrusted to his Protestant kinsman, Sir Thomas Pelham. One of the richest men in East Sussex, Sir Thomas was a prominent local Puritan, and Stapley became a close political associate of his son, the younger Thomas. Stapley appears to have entered Christ's College, Cambridge around 1606, then from 1609 studied law at Gray's Inn in London.

Stapley represented the borough of New Shoreham in the parliaments of 1624 and 1625, as well as the borough of Lewes in 1628, having unseated Sir George Rivers by petition. He was returned both for the county of Sussex and for the borough of Lewes to the Short Parliament in March 1640, when he elected to sit for the county. He was again chosen by the county on 22 October 1640 to sit in the Long Parliament, and represented it in the Barebones Parliament of 1653 and the First Protectorate Parliament of 1654.

In January 1640 Stapley, then a justice of the peace, was reported to Dr. William Bray, Archbishop Laud's chaplain, as causing trouble to the churches by his puritan leanings. On the outbreak of the English Civil War he received a colonel's commission in the parliamentary army, and was present at the siege of Chichester in December 1642 under Sir William Waller. He was left as governor of the town and garrison when Waller moved on to the siege of Arundel Castle. On 22 September 1643 he took the covenant. At the beginning of 1644 he raised objections to the quartering in the town of some of Waller's horses. The dispute was referred to a committee of the House of Commons, and finally to the committee of both kingdoms on 26 February, where he was ordered by both bodies to observe Waller's commands. While detained in London, he was exonerated from all blame in the event of disaster at Chichester. He resumed the command of the town and garrison at the termination of the proceedings early in March. He retained his governorship till 1645, when he was succeeded by Colonel Algernon Sidney. In January 1644, he was deputy lieutenant of the county of Sussex.

Stapley was one of the commissioners who sat in judgement on Charles I during his trial for high treason. Stapley was present at Westminster Hall on 27 January 1649 when sentence was pronounced, and signed the death-warrant on 29 January. He was elected a member of the first Council of State of the Commonwealth on 17 February 1649 (when he signed the engagement), and re-elected on 17 February 1649 – 1650, 25 November 1651, 30 November 1652, and 9 July 1653. He was one of Cromwell's interim council of thirteen (29 April to 14 July 1653), and of the supreme assembly called on 6 June 1653. He had joined the admiralty committee of the committee of both kingdoms on 6 June 1649, was nominated vice-admiral for the county of Sussex on 22 February 1650, and took the oath of secrecy the following day. He died early in 1655, and was buried at Patcham on 31 January. At the Restoration, he was one of the regicides notified as dead, and excepted from the act of Pardon and Oblivion of 6 June 1660, making his estate subject to confiscation.

== Sources ==
- Davidson, Alan (2010). PELHAM, Thomas (1597-1654), of Laughton and Halland, East Hoathley, Suss; in The History of Parliament: the House of Commons 1604-1629. CUP. ISBN 978-1107002258.
- Davidson, Alan; Coates, Ben (2010). STAPLEY, Anthony (1590-1655), of Patcham, Suss; in The History of Parliament: the House of Commons 1604-1629. CUP. ISBN 978-1107002258.
- Porter, Bertha (2008). "Stapley, Anthony". In Peacey, J.T (ed.). Oxford Dictionary of National Biography (online ed.). Oxford University Press. doi:10.1093/ref:odnb/26309. (Subscription, Wikipedia Library access or UK public library membership required.)
- Thomas-Stanford, Charles (1910). Sussex in the great Civil War and the interregnum, 1642-1660. Chiswick Press.
