= Second Protectorate Parliament =

17th-century English parliament

The Second Protectorate Parliament in England sat for two sessions from 17 September 1656 until 4 February 1658, with Thomas Widdrington as the Speaker of the House of Commons. In its first session, the House of Commons was its only chamber; in the second session an Other House with a power of veto over the decisions of the Commons was added.

== Background ==
There were two sessions the first from 17 September 1656 until 26 June 1657 and a second from 20 January until 4 February 1658. The Second Protectorate Parliament was summoned reluctantly by the Lord Protector Oliver Cromwell on the advice of the Major-Generals who were running the country as regions under military governors. The Major-Generals thought that a compliant parliament would be the best way to raise money to pay for the Army occupation, and the Navy both of which were involved in the Anglo-Spanish War (1654–1660).

The elections were held under the new written constitution called Instrument of Government. It included returning up to thirty members from Scotland and up to another thirty from Ireland. Royalists and Catholics were prevented from standing or voting under Articles XIV and XV. After the election the Council of State stopped one hundred elected members from taking their seats by declaring that they were not "of known integrity, fearing God" (Article VII). A further fifty withdrew in protest which left about two hundred and fifty to take their seats for the first session.

== First session ==
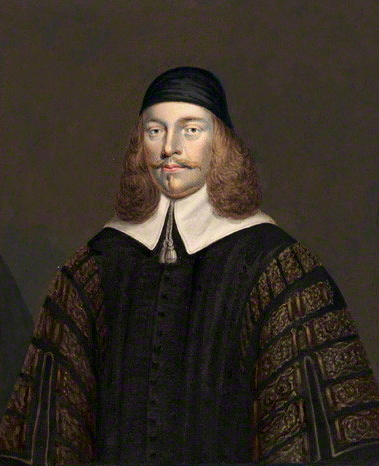
Sir Thomas Widdrington.

The first session opened in December 1656. The Protectorate government did not have much pressing legislation to present so the House occupied its time with private members bills. However over the next few months three issues would dominate the session. The first was the Militia Bill, the second was the Nayler case and the third was constitutional reform (the Humble Petition and Advice), which was influenced by the failure of the Militia Bill to pass and the Naylor case was to show that the members of Parliament were less religiously tolerant than was constitutionally allowed in Instrument of Government.

=== Militia Bill ===
The House voted down Major-General John Desborough's "Militia Bill" on 29 January 1657 by one hundred and twenty four votes to eighty eight. This bill would have perpetuated the Decimation Tax that funded the mounted militia, which was collected by Cromwell's Major-Generals; the failure of the bill caused the so-called rule of the Major-Generals in the counties to end.

=== Introduction of the Humble Petition and Advice ===
With the rejection of the Decimation Tax, it was clear that government through the Major-Generals could not continue. In February 1657 Cromwell was offered the crown and a new constitution called the Humble Petition and Advice.

=== Naylor case ===
On Palm Sunday 1656 James Naylor, a Quaker, reenacted the arrival of Christ in Jerusalem by riding a horse into Bristol attended by followers who sang "Holy, holy, holy" and strewed the way with their garments. Although Naylor denied that he was impersonating Jesus, this act outraged many in Parliament in what was seen as an act of blasphemy. There was consensus in the House that Naylor should be punished. However while the House of Commons could pass, and had in recent times passed, acts of attainder against people, it was questioned whether the House could invoke a judicial procedure like that of the now disbanded House of Lords. After much debate and looking at old precedents, the House concluded that it had the right to act in a judicial capacity. So they tried Naylor and passed the following resolution for his blasphemy:

That James Naylor shall be put in the pillory in the city of Westminster for the space of two hours, on Thursday next, and then be whipped by the hangman through the streets from Westminster to the Old Change, and there be put in the pillory again from the hours of eleven to one on the following Saturday. He shall then have his tongue bored through with a red hot iron, and be branded with the letter B, and sent to Bristol, where he shall be paraded through the city on horseback, with his face backward. From Bristol he shall be brought back to London and sent to the Tower, there to be kept to hard labour by order of Parliament, and be debarred the use of pen, ink, and paper, and have no relief but what he can earn by his daily labour.

=== Acceptance of the Humble Petition and Advice ===
After some thought, Cromwell declined the crown as embodied in the Humble Petition. The Naylor case had shown that the members of Parliament were less religiously tolerant than the constitution allowed, and the assumption of judicial powers by the House, worried many in the House, the Grandees in the Army, and Cromwell. So encouraged, Cromwell with the support of the Grandees, pressed the house for a second chamber.

After modifications had been made to the Humble Petition, Cromwell agreed to the new constitution and in June 1657 he was reinstated as Lord Protector under the articles of the Humble Petition and Advice. Parliament then went into recess for the summer.

== Second session ==
The Army Grandees agreed to allow the MPs who had been excluded under Article VII of the Instrument of Government to be allowed to take their seats. But to make sure that the House would be compliant to their wishes, Cromwell nominated 63 members to "Other House" permitted by the Humble Petition and Advice, 42 accepted and 37 came to the first meeting.

This triggered a wave of republican protest in the House of Commons which spread to the rank and file of the Army. Amidst fears of a Levellers revival and Royalist plots, under the prerogative granted to the Lord Protector by the Humble Petition and Advice, Oliver Cromwell dissolved Parliament on 4 February 1658.

== Succession ==
The Second Protectorate Parliament was preceded by the First Protectorate Parliament and succeeded by the Third Protectorate Parliament.

== See also ==
- List of parliaments of England
- List of MPs elected to the English parliament in 1656
