= First Protectorate Parliament =

Cromwellian English parliament, 1654–1655

The First Protectorate Parliament was summoned by the Lord Protector Oliver Cromwell under the terms of the Instrument of Government. It sat for one term from 3 September 1654 until 22 January 1655 with William Lenthall as the Speaker of the House.

During the first nine months of the Protectorate, Cromwell with the aid of the Council of State, drew up a list of 84 bills to present to Parliament for ratification. But the members of Parliament had their own and their constituents' interests to promote and in the end not enough of them would agree to work with Cromwell, or to sign a declaration of their acceptance of the Instrument of Government, to make the constitutional arrangements in the Instrument of Government work. Cromwell dissolved the Parliament as soon as it was allowed under the terms of the Instrument of Government, having failed to get any of the 84 bills passed.

Some outspoken parliamentary supremacists and critics of Cromwell were barred from entry after refusing to sign the recognition. These included Arthur Haselrig and Thomas Scot

== Parliamentary constituencies ==
The Instrument of Government specified the numbers of members of parliament that boroughs and counties in England and Wales would send to the Parliament, totalling 400. By omission from the list, rotten boroughs were abolished. A few boroughs not previously enfranchised, notably Leeds and Manchester, received a seat. All the traditional counties were represented (Durham for the first time). In addition some well established sub-divisions of counties were given separate representation. There were substantial changes in the number of seats many constituencies received, particularly amongst the counties. This was the first systematic redistribution of Parliamentary seats in English history and would not be matched for a Royal Parliament until the Reform Act 1832.

In the list below, the name of the constituency (as specified in Section X of the Instrument of Government, with minor spelling changes) is followed by the number of seats allocated. The Boroughs in each county follow the county constituency (indicated by boldface and an * after the constituency name). Those areas marked ** were divisions of a traditional county.

The Instrument of Government also made provision for members from Jersey and Guernsey, without defining the numbers or arrangements for the election of such members. It is not clear that any were actually elected, as they are not mentioned in the Journal of the House of Commons for this Parliament. It is also notable that when on 6 and 7 October 1654 the House of Commons debated "the distribution of the number of members to serve in future Parliaments", Guibon Goddard MP recorded in his journal that "we agreed with the Instrument, in the whole number of four hundred, Jersey and Guernsey being left out, because not governed by our laws, but by municipal laws of their own; and we differed but little in the particular distribution."

The Lord Protector and his Council were given power to provide for the representation of Scotland and Ireland, which was done by later legislation giving 30 seats to each country. This was the first time Scotland and Ireland were represented in a Westminster Parliament.

== Constituencies and Members of Parliament ==
Table 1: Constituencies by type
Type	English Constit.	Welsh Constit.	Scottish Constit.	Irish Constit.	Total Constit.	English MPs	Welsh MPs	Scots MPs	Irish MPs	Total MPs
Borough/Burgh	104	2	9	6	121	131	2	10	6	149
County/Shire	44	12	20	13	89	242	23	20	24	309
University	2	—	—	—	2	2	—	—	—	2
Number of constituencies	150	14	29	19	212					
Members returned	375	25	30	30	460	375	25	30	30	460

Table 2: Constituencies, by number of seats
Type	x1	x2	x3	x4	x5	x6	x8	x9	x10	x11	x13	Total Const.	Total MPs
Borough/Burgh	97	23	—	—	—	1	—	—	—	—	—	121	149
County/Shire	23	28	4	12	7	4	2	1	4	3	1	89	309
University	2	—	—	—	—	—	—	—	—	—	—	2	2
Number of constituencies	122	51	4	12	7	5	2	1	4	3	1	212	
Members returned	122	102	12	48	35	30	16	9	40	33	13		460

Notes:

1. Monmouthshire (3 county seats) included in England, not Wales.
2. Dublin City and County treated as a county constituency (2 seats).

== List of constituencies ==
=== England ===
- Bedfordshire*: 5
  1. Bedford Town: 1
- Berkshire*: 5
  1. Abingdon: 1
  2. Reading: 1
- Buckinghamshire*: 5
  1. Aylesbury: 1
  2. Buckingham Town: 1
  3. Wycombe: 1
- Cambridgeshire*: 4
  1. Cambridge Town: 1
  2. Cambridge University: 1
  3. Isle of Ely**: 2
- Cheshire*: 4
  1. Chester: 1
- Cornwall*: 8
  1. East Looe & West Looe:1
  2. Launceston: 1
  3. Penryn: 1
  4. Truro: 1
- Cumberland*: 2
  1. Carlisle: 1
- Derbyshire*: 4
  1. Derby Town: 1
- Devonshire*: 11
  1. Barnstable: 1
  2. Clifton, Dartmouth, Hardness: 1
  3. Exeter: 2
  4. Honiton: 1
  5. Plymouth: 2
  6. Tiverton: 1
  7. Totnes: 1
- Dorsetshire*: 6
  1. Dorchester: 1
  2. Lyme-Regis: 1
  3. Poole: 1
  4. Weymouth and Melcombe-Regis: 1
- Durham*: 2
  1. City of Durham: 1
- Essex*: 13
  1. Colchester: 2
  2. Maldon: 1
- Gloucestershire*: 5
  1. Cirencester: 1
  2. Gloucester: 2
  3. Tewkesbury: 1
- Herefordshire*: 4
  1. Hereford: 1
  2. Leominster: 1
- Hertfordshire*: 5
  1. Hertford: 1
  2. St. Alban's: 1
- Huntingdonshire*: 3
  1. Huntingdon: 1
- Kent*: 11
  1. Canterbury: 2
  2. Dover: 1
  3. Maidstone: 1
  4. Queenborough: 1
  5. Rochester: 1
  6. Sandwich: 1
- Lancashire*: 4
  1. Lancaster: 1
  2. Liverpool: 1
  3. Manchester: 1
  4. Preston: 1
- Leicestershire*: 4
  1. Leicester: 2
- Lincolnshire*: 10
  1. Boston: 1
  2. Grantham: 1
  3. Great Grimsby: 1
  4. Lincoln: 2
  5. Stamford: 1
- Middlesex*: 4
- London: 6
- Westminster: 2
- Monmouthshire*: 3
- Norfolk*: 10
  1. Great Yarmouth: 2
  2. Lynn-Regis: 2
  3. Norwich: 2
- Northamptonshire*: 6
  1. Northampton: 1
  2. Peterborough: 1
- Nottinghamshire*: 4
  1. Nottingham: 2
- Northumberland*: 3
  1. Berwick: 1
  2. Newcastle upon Tyne: 1
- Oxfordshire*: 5
  1. Oxford City: 1
  2. Oxford University: 1
  3. Woodstock: 1
- Rutlandshire*: 2
- Shropshire*: 4
  1. Bridgnorth: 1
  2. Ludlow: 1
  3. Shrewsbury: 2
- Staffordshire*: 3
  1. Lichfield: 1
  2. Newcastle-under-Lyne: 1
  3. Stafford: 1
- Somersetshire*: 11
  1. Bath: 1
  2. Bridgwater: 1
  3. Bristol: 2
  4. Taunton: 2
  5. Wells: 1
- Southamptonshire*: 8
  1. Andover: 1
  2. Isle of Wight**: 2
  3. Portsmouth: 1
  4. Southampton: 1
  5. Winchester: 1
- Suffolk*: 10
  1. Bury St. Edmunds: 2
  2. Dunwich: 1
  3. Ipswich: 2
  4. Sudbury: 1
- Surrey*: 6
  1. Guildford: 1
  2. Reigate: 1
  3. Southwark: 2
- Sussex*: 9
  1. Arundel: 1
  2. Chichester: 1
  3. East Grinstead: 1
  4. Lewes: 1
  5. Rye: 1
- Warwickshire*: 4
  1. Coventry: 2
  2. Warwick: 1
- Westmoreland*: 2
- Wiltshire*: 10
  1. Devizes: 1
  2. Marlborough: 1
  3. New Sarum: 2
- Worcestershire*: 5
  1. Worcester: 2
- Yorkshire* East Riding**: 4
  1. Beverley: 1
  2. Kingston-upon-Hull: 1
- Yorkshire* North Riding**: 4
  1. City of York: 2
  2. Richmond: 1
  3. Scarborough: 1
- Yorkshire* West Riding**: 6
  1. Halifax: 1
  2. Leeds: 1

=== Wales ===
Brecknockshire is attributed 3 seats in the text of the Instrument of Government linked to by this article, but other on-line versions say 2 and that is consistent with the total of 400 seats for England and Wales.

- Anglesey*: 2
- Brecknockshire*: 2
- Cardiganshire*: 2
- Carmarthenshire*: 2
- Carnarvonshire*: 2
- Denbighshire*: 2
- Flintshire*: 2
- Glamorganshire*: 2
- Merionethshire*: 1
- Montgomeryshire*: 2
- Pembrokeshire*: 2
  1. Haverfordwest: 1
- Radnorshire*: 2

=== Scotland ===
Provision for representation of the shires (marked *) and burghs of Scotland was made by An Ordinance by the Protector for Elections in Scotland of 27 June 1654. The Burgh, amongst those in a district, where the elections were to take place is marked in capitals. The shire of Merse is a historic name for Berwickshire.

- Aberdeen*: 1
  1. Banff, Cullen, and ABERDEEN: 1
- Ayr and Renfrew*: 1
- Banff*: 1
- Dumbarton, Argyle, and Bute*: 1
- Dumfries*: 1
  1. Dumfries, Sinclair, Lochmaben, Annandale, Wigton, Kirkcudbright, Whithorn, and Galloway: 1
- East-Lothian*: 1
- Elgin and Nairn*: 1
- Fife and Kinross*: 1
  1. St. Andrews, Dysart, Kirkcaldy, Cupar, Anstruther East, Pittenween, Crail, Dunfermline, Kinghorn, Anstruther West, Inverkeithing, Kilrenny, and Burnt Island: 1
- Inverness*: 1
  1. Dornoch, Tain, INVERNESS, Dingwall, Nairn, Elgin, and Fortrose: 1
- Kincardine and Forfar*: 1
  1. Forfar, DUNDEE, Arbroath, Montrose, and Brechin: 1
- Lanark*: 1
  1. Lanark, GLASGOW, Rutherglen, Rothesay, Renfrew, Ayr,
    Irvine and Dumbarton: 1
- Linlithgow, Stirling, and Clackmannan*: 1
  1. Linlithgow, Queensferry, Perth, Culross, and STIRLING: 1
- Merse*: 1
1. Peebles, Selkirk, Jedburgh, Lauder, N. Berwick, Dunbar, and Haddington: 1
- Mid-Lothian*: 1
1. Edinburgh: 2
- Orkney, Shetland and Caithness*: 1
- Perth*: 1
- Roxburgh*: 1
- Selkirk and Peebles*: 1
- Sutherland, Ross and Cromarty*: 1
- Wigton*: 1

=== Ireland ===
Provision for representation of the counties (marked *) and boroughs of Ireland was made by An Ordinance by the Protector for Elections in Ireland of 27 June 1654. The Borough, amongst those in a district, where the elections were to take place is marked in capitals.

- Carlow, Wexford, Kilkenny and Queen's*: 2
- Cavan, Fermanagh and Monaghan*: 1
- Cork'*: 1
  1. Cork and Youghall: 1
  2. Bandon and Kinsale: 1
- Derry, Donegal and Tyrone*: 2
1. DERRY and Coleraine: 1
- Down, Antrim and Armagh*: 2
  1. Carrickfergus and Belfast: 1
- Dublin County* and City: 2
- Galway and Mayo*: 2
- Kerry, Limerick and Clare*: 2
1. LIMERICK City and Killmallock: 1
- Kildare and Wicklow*: 2
- Meath and Louth*: 2
- Sligo, Roscommon and Leitrim*: 2
- Waterford and Tipperary*: 2
  1. WATERFORD and Clonmel Cities: 1
- Westmeath, Longford and King's*: 2

The First Protectorate Parliament was preceded by the Barebones Parliament and succeeded by the Second Protectorate Parliament.

== See also ==
- List of parliaments of England
- List of MPs elected to the English parliament in 1654

== Bibliography ==
From Cromwell:The Oliver Cromwell Website: a select bibliography of books and articles:

- A number of articles explore aspects of Cromwell's Protectorate parliaments: H.R. Trevor-Roper's crucial 1956 article on 'Oliver Cromwell and his parliaments', which was included in several later collections and is perhaps most accessible in I. Roots (ed), Cromwell, A Profile (1973);
- P. Gaunt, 'Law making in the first Protectorate Parliament' in C. Jones, M. Newitt & S. Roberts (eds), Politics and People in Revolutionary England (1986);
- I. Roots, 'Law making in the second Protectorate Parliament' in H. Hearder & H.R. Loyn (eds), British Government and Administration (1974);
- P. Gaunt, 'Cromwell's purge? Exclusions and the first Protectorate Parliament' in Parliamentary History 6 (1987);
- C.S. Egloff, 'The search for a Cromwellian settlement: exclusions from the second Protectorate Parliament' in Parliamentary History 17 (1998);
- D. L. Smith, ‘Oliver Cromwell, the first Protectorate Parliament and religious reform’ in Parliamentary History 19 (2000);
- T.A. Wilson & F.J. Merli, 'Naylor's case and the dilemma of the Protectorate' in University of Birmingham Historical Journal 10 (1965-6); and C.H. Firth, 'Cromwell and the crown' in English Historical Review 17 & 18 (1902 & 1903).
