= Knights, baronets and peers of the Protectorate =

During the Protectorate period (1653–1659) of the Commonwealth of England, the Lord Protector reserved the power previously held by the monarch to confer knighthoods, baronetcies and peerages.

== Knights ==
=== Lord Protector Oliver Cromwell ===
Knights made by Oliver Cromwell: (Note: It appears by Cray's examination of Neale, that the Speaker of the House of Commons had the power of knighthood given to him after the execution of King Charles I and that accordingly, in 1649, by recommendation of the House, he knighted Thomas Andrews, Alderman and Lord Mayor of London; and Isaac Fennington and Thomas Atkins, Aldermen of that city.)

- Henry Cromwell — his son.
- 8 February 1654, Thomas Vyner — Lord Mayor of London (knighted at Grocers' Hall, London).
- 1653 or 1654, William Boteler.
- 1 June 1655, John Coppleston — Sheriff of Devon, (knighted at Whitehall).
- 11 June 1655, John Reynolds — commissary general in Ireland, son of Sir James, of Essex, drowned 1657 (knighted at Whitehall).
- 20 September 1655, Christopher Packe — Lord Mayor of London (knighted at Whitehall).
- 17 January 1656, Colonel Thomas Pride — (knighted at Whitehall).
- 19 January 1656, John Barkstead — lieutenant of the Tower of London and major general, of Middlesex (knighted at Whitehall).
- 3 May 1656, Peter Julius Coyet — ambassador from the King of Sweden (knighted at Whitehall). (Note: Masson gives the date as 15 April 1656.)
- 26 July 1656, Gustavus du Vale — one of the chief gentlemen attending the Swedish ambassador (knighted at Whitehall).
- July 1656, Anthony Morgan — knighted at Whitehall, on being sent over especially from Ireland to inform the protector of the state of Ireland. (Note: Shaw notes an erratum see infra under date 26 July 1658 (that he was knighted by Henry Cromwell at Dublin Castle — he would not have been knighted twice under the Protectorate), also see p. 232 infra (Shaw 1906, p. 223).)
- August 1656, Richard Combe — of Combe, Co. Herts, (knighted at Whitehall). (Note: A Richard Combe, of Hemel Hempstead was knighted by Charles II on 5 February 1601.)
- 15 September 1656, John Dethick — Lord Mayor of London (knighted at Whitehall).
- 15 September 1656, George Fleetwood — of Buckinghamshire, (knighted at Whitehall).
- 10 December 1656, William Lockhart — colonel, The Protector's ambassador resident in France (knighted at Whitehall).
- 10 December 1656, James Calthorpe — Sheriff of Suffolk (knighted at Whitehall).
- 15 December 1656, Robert Titchborne — Lord Mayor of London (knighted at Whitehall). (Note: Masson date is 10 December 1656)
- 15 December 1656, Lislebone Long — Recorder of London (knighted at Whitehall).
- 6 January 1657, James Whitelocke — colonel, son and heir of Sir Bulstrode Whitelocke (knighted at Whitehall).
- 3 March 1657, Thomas Dickenson — alderman of York (knighted at Whitehall).
- 11 June 1657, Richard Stayner — commander of the frigate Speaker.
- 16 July 1657, John Claypole, bart. — married Elizabeth, Oliver Cromwell's second daughter (knighted at Whitehall. (Note: Not mentioned by Masson.)
- 26 August 1657, William Wheeler — of Channel Row, Westminster (knighted at Hampton Court).
- 2 or 7 November 1657, Edward Ward — Sheriff of Norfolk. (Note: Both Shaw and Masson state the 2 November but Shaw favours the 7 November.)
- 14 November 1657, Thomas Andrews, Alderman and Mayor of London in 1650 (knighted at Whitehall).
- 5 December 1657, Thomas Foote, Alderman
- 5 December 1657, Thomas Atkins — Alderman and Mayor of London in 1653.
- 5 December 1657, John Hewson.
- 6 January 1658, James Drax. (Note: Masson dates this award 31 December 1657.)
- 1 February 1658, Henry Pickering. (Note: Masson name him Henry Bickering.)
- 1 February 1658, Philip Twisleton — brother of the Protectorate baronet John Twisleton
- 2 or 22 March 1658, John Ireton — (at Whitehall). (Note: Both Shaw and Masson state the 22 March but Shaw favours the 2 March and also mentions the 9 March as a possible date.)
- 9 March 1658, John Lenthall.
- 22 March 1658, Richard Chiverton (Chevedon) — Lord Mayor of London (knighted at Whitehall).
- 17 July 1658, Henry Jones of Oxfordshire, for distinguished bravery at the Battle of Dunkirk. (Note: "Henry Jones of Oxfordshire, mentioned above as fighting at Fenwick's side, became wounded in three places, when, mounting a cavalier's horse, he struck in with the pursuing French cavalry, but had the mishap to be taken prisoner. As soon as ho was exchanged and had got back to England, the Protector knighted him at Hampton Court" (Waylen 1880, p. 212).) (Note: The following knighthoods are included by Noble 1784, pp. 442–438, Metcalfe 1885, p. 205—who cites Noble, and Shaw 1906, p. 224—who seems to have based his list on Noble; but are not included in the list provided by Masson 1877, p. 303 and according to George Cokayne (1903) "The best authority for the Cromwellian creations appears to be Masson's Life of Milton":(Cokayne 1903, p. 2))
- ? Thomas Whitgrave.
- ? William Ellis — [see 1671, Apr. 10].
- ? John Carter of Wales.
- ? John Strode — Sheriff of Dorset.

=== Lord Protector Richard Cromwell ===
Knights made by Lord Protector Richard Cromwell:

- 26 November 1658, Thomas Morgan, after the Battle of the Dunes (Note: Dodd cites Whitelock, Memorials, iv, 338, and notes that both Shaw 1906, p. 224 and Noble & 1784 ii, p. 543 misname him John in this context.)
- 6 December 1658, Richard Beke.

=== Henry Cromwell, Lord Deputy of Ireland ===
Knights made in Ireland by Henry Cromwell, lord deputy of Ireland:

- 24 November 1657, Matthew Thomlinson — (at Dublin in the Council Chamber). (Note: Masson dates this one day later on 25 November 1657. He mentions no other knighthoods bestowed by Henry Cromwell.)
- 2 May 1658, Robert Goodwin — (at Dublin in the Council Chamber).
- 7 June 1658, Maurice Fenton — (in the forenoon at Cork House).
- 7 June 1658, John King — (in the afternoon in the Council Chamber).
- 21 July 1658, William Burry — (at Dublin Castle).
- 22 July 1658, John Perceval — (at Dublin Castle).
- 26 July 1658, Anthony Morgan — (at Dublin Castle).
- 26 July 1658, Thomas Herbert — (at Dublin Castle).
- 16 November 1658, Hierome Sanky — (at Dublin Castle).
- 16 November 1658, Daniel Abbot — (at Dublin Castle).
- 30 November 1658, Henry Piers — (at Dublin Castle).
- 20 December 1658, William Penn — (at Dublin Castle).
- 24 January 1659, Thomas Stanley — (at Dublin Castle).
- 23 February 1659, Oliver St George — (at Dublin Castle).

== Baronets ==
The following baronetcies were conferred by the lord protector Oliver Cromwell (all the Cromwellian baronetcies became invalid on the restoration of monarchy, 29 May 1660): (Note: The best authority for the Cromwellian creations appears to be Masson's Life of Milton in which 11 Baronetcies are stated to have been thus created:(Cokayne 1903, p. 2) Read, Cleypole, Chamberlayne (25 June, 20 July, and 6 Oct. 1657), Beaumont (5 March 1658), Ingoldsby, Twisleton, Wright, Williams, Prideaux, Ellis and Wyndham (10 April [ter] 28 May, 13 Aug. [6is] and 28 Aug. 1658). Of these eleven, the Baronetcy of Wyndham is omitted in Noble's Cromwell (vol. i, pp. 439-442, edit. 1787), while Baronetcies ascribed to Dunch and Willis (certainly in error) and to Lenthal (presumably in error—see below) are therein inserted. Masson, who is eminently painstaking and careful, states that the list is the best he has been able to put together. It is mostly the same as that in the [old] Parliamentary History (vol. xxi, p. 220), where these creations stand thus: 1656 [sic] June 25, Read; 1657, July 16, Cleypole; Oct. 6, Chamberlain; Nov. 5, Beaumont; Nov. 24, Twisleton; 1658, March 31, Ingoldsby and Wright; May 28, Williams; Aug. 13, Prideaux and Ellis; Aug. 28, Wyndham. The first date herein (1656) is clearly wrong. (Cokayne 1903, p. 2) The undoubted Baronetcies of Prideaux, Ellis, and Wyndham are not in Banks's continuation of Dugdale's Catalogue; the Cromwellian creations given therein (eight in all) being Read, Beaumont, Twisleton, Cleypole, Chamberlayne, Ingoldsby, Wright and Williams. Dunch, Willis and Lenthal (for all three of which Noble's Cromwell seems the only authority) are also (apparently rightly) omitted (Cokayne 1903, p. 6).: Edmund Dunch There is an apparently erroneous statement in Noble's Cromwell [vol. i, pp. 438-442, edit. 1787] that "Edmund Dunch, of Little Wittenham, in Berkshire, Esq. [was] created a Baronet, April 26, 1657-8" [sic] by the Lord Protector Cromwell. The date presumably, 26 April 1658, is that on which Edmund Dunch was created a Peer by the Lord Protector, as Baron Brunell of East Wittenham, Berks. (see the Peerages section in this article).; Thomas Willis Although Noble mentions this man in his lives as a protectorate baronet, it appears that Noble is confused as Sir Thomas Willys, 1st Baronet who was created a baronet by Charles I in December 1641 (a date early enough to be recognised as a legal creation by the Commonwealth negating the need for the Lord Protector to issue a new honour), and was the man who sat in the Third Protectorate Parliament (see the Wikipedia biography article on the man).; John Lenthall Another statement, presumably also erroneous, in Noble's Cromwell, is that a baronetcy was conferred by the Lord Protector on "John Lenthall, Esq., only son of Will. Lenthall, one of Oliver's Lords". No date is assigned to this alleged Cromwellian creation, but, if it ever was conferred, it would probably have been in 1658. John Lenthall was the only son of Speaker William Lenthal, he was knighted by Cromwell on 9 March 1658, hoverer none of the other sources consulted by George Cokayne (1903) found any record of the granting of a baronet to John Lenthall and he concludes that Nobel was in error.)

- 25 June 1657, John Read of Brocket Hall, Hertfordshire. — Read had a baronetcy before the interregnum, so, when Cromwell's baronetcies passed into oblivion, he was entitled to use his previous baronetcy.
- 20 July 1657, John Claypole of Northborough, father of Lord Claypole. — Claypole's baronetcy passed into oblivion.
- 6 October 1657, Thomas Chamberlayne — Chamberlayne had a baronetcy before the interregnum, so, when Cromwell's baronetcies passed into oblivion, at the Restoration, he was entitled to use his previous baronetcy.
- 5 March 1658, Thomas Beaumont, of Leicestershire — At the Restoration, Beaumont's Cromwellian baronetcy passed into oblivion, but he was granted a new one by Charles II, on 21 February 1661.
- 10 April 1658, Colonel Henry Ingoldsby — At the Restoration, Ingoldsby's Cromwellian baronetcy passed into oblivion, but he was granted a new one by Charles II, on 30 August 1661.
- 10 April 1658, John Twisleton. — At the Restoration, Twisleton's Cromwellian baronetcy passed into oblivion.
- 10 April 1658, Henry Wright — Son of Cromwell's personal physician, Dr Laurence Wright. At the Restoration, Wright's Cromwellian baronetcy passed into oblivion, but he was granted a new one by Charles II, on 11 June 1660.
- 28 May 1658, Griffith Williams, of Carnarvonshire. — At the Restoration, Williams's Cromwellian baronetcy passed into oblivion, but he was granted a new one by Charles II, on 17 June 1661.
- 13 August 1658, Attorney General Edmund Prideaux. — Shortly after Prideaux received the baronetcy, the title was inherited by his son, Edmund Prideaux, and then, less than a year later, passed into oblivion, at the Restoration.
- 13 August 1658, Solicitor General William Ellis. — At the Restoration, Ellis's Cromwellian baronetcy passed into oblivion, but he received a knighthood from Charles II, on 10 April 1671.
- 28 August 1658, William Wyndham, county Somerset. — At the Restoration, Wyndham's Cromwellian baronetcy passed into oblivion, but he received a knighthood from Charles II (between April 1660 and April 1661) and was granted a baronetcy by Charles II, on 9 December 1661.

The Protectorate baronetcies, being rare, seem to have been much prized; and that of Henry Ingoldsby raised jealousies.

== Peers ==
Permanent life members were created for Cromwell's Other House (similar in concept to the modern life peers, who sit in the House of Lords) and were addressed as "lord". However, with the exception of Lord Eure, none of those who already had peerages granted under the ancient regime took up their seats in the Other House. When Oliver Cromwell died, those in the funeral procession who had noble titles under the monarchy were so called (for example, "Edward Earl of Manchester"), those who had sat in Cromwell's Other House were called "lord" (for example "Philip Lord Skipton"), but those such as "George Monck, General in Scotland", who had not taken up their seats in the Other House, were not referred to as "lord".

Aside from the Other House members who were known as "lords", two peerages are known to have been granted by the lord protector and a third may have been:

- Colonel Charles Howard, a scion of the Norfolk and Surrey and Arundel-landed Howards - "Viscount Howard of Morpeth and Baron Gilsland in Cumberland" — "Cromwell's favourite". He was raised (elevated further) to Earl of Carlisle by Charles II
- Edmund Dunch, of Little Wittenham, Berks - Baron Burnell, April 20, 1658 — Cromwell's relative. Charles II granted him no title and he, his son and grandson (after which it became extinct) did not use the title after the Restoration.

In addition, Cromwell signaled his intention to grant a title shortly before his death, but no use or record other than this wish is known:

- Bulstrode Whitelocke — possibly a viscount.
