= Sir James Langham, 2nd Baronet =

English politician

Sir James Langham, 2nd Baronet (c. 1621 – 22 August 1699) of Cottesbrook, Northamptonshire was an English politician who sat in the House of Commons at various times between 1656 and 1662. He married four times, but he had no heir.

== Life ==
Langham was the eldest son of Sir John Langham, 1st Baronet and his wife Mary Bunce. He was educated at Emmanuel College, Cambridge, where he matriculated in 1638, and was admitted to Lincoln's Inn in 1640 to train for the law. He was knighted in 1660 and appointed Sheriff of Northamptonshire for 1664.

In 1656, Langham was elected Member of Parliament for Northamptonshire in the Second Protectorate Parliament. He was elected MP for Northampton in 1659 for the Third Protectorate Parliament. In 1661, Langham was elected Member of Parliament for Northampton in the Cavalier Parliament but the election was declared void on 13 June. Langham was again elected MP for Northampton in February 1662 but the election was also declared void on 26 April 1662.

Langham inherited the baronetcy on the death of his father in 1671. He was elected a Fellow of the Royal Society in 1678.

Langham married four times, his first wife being Mary Alston, the daughter of Sir Edward Alston. His second wife was Elizabeth Hastings who was known her religious observance. She was the daughter of the poet Lady Lucy and Ferdinando Hastings, 6th Earl of Huntingdon and she came with a £10,000 dowry. His third wife was Penelope, the daughter of John Holles, 2nd Earl of Clare and his fourth wife was Dorothy, the daughter of John Pomeroy of Devon.

He died at Kensington and was buried at Cottesbrooke, Northamptonshire, leaving no male children. He was succeeded in the baronetcy by his brother William. His daughter married Henry Booth, 1st Earl of Warrington.

Parliament of England
Preceded by Sir Gilbert Pickering, Bt Thomas Brooke; John Crew; Sir John Norwich, Bt; John Claypole, senior Sir John Dryden, Bt	Member of Parliament for Northamptonshire; 1656; With: Sir Gilbert Pickering, Bt; John, Lord Claypole; William Boteler; Thomas Crew; Alexander Blake	Succeeded by Richard Knightley; Philip Holman
Preceded by Francis Harvey	Member of Parliament for Northampton; 1659; With: Francis Harvey	Succeeded by Not represented in Restored Rump
Baronetage of England
Preceded by John Langham	Baronet (of Cottesbrooke); 1671–1699	Succeeded by William Langham
