= Philip Holman =

English merchant and politician

Philip Holman (c. 1593 – July 1669) was an English merchant and politician who sat in the House of Commons in 1659.

Holman was a scrivener of London and a member of the Worshipful Company of Grocers. He acquired property at Warkworth, Northamptonshire from the Chetwood family and rebuilt part of the manor house. He became High Sheriff of Northamptonshire in 1638. In 1651 he was elected alderman of the City of London for Walbrook ward and was also elected Sheriff of the City of London.

In 1659, Holman was elected Member of Parliament for Northamptonshire in the Third Protectorate Parliament.

Holman died at the age of 76 and was buried in the church at Warkworth.

Holman was the father of Sir John Holman, 1st Baronet.

Parliament of England
Preceded by Sir Gilbert Pickering, 1st Baronet; John Claypole; William Boteler; Sir James Langham, 2nd Baronet; Thomas Crew, 2nd Baron Crew; Alexander Blake	Member of Parliament for Northamptonshire; 1659; With: Richard Knightley	Succeeded by Sir Gilbert Pickering, 1st Baronet
