= Thomas Crew, 2nd Baron Crew =

English politician

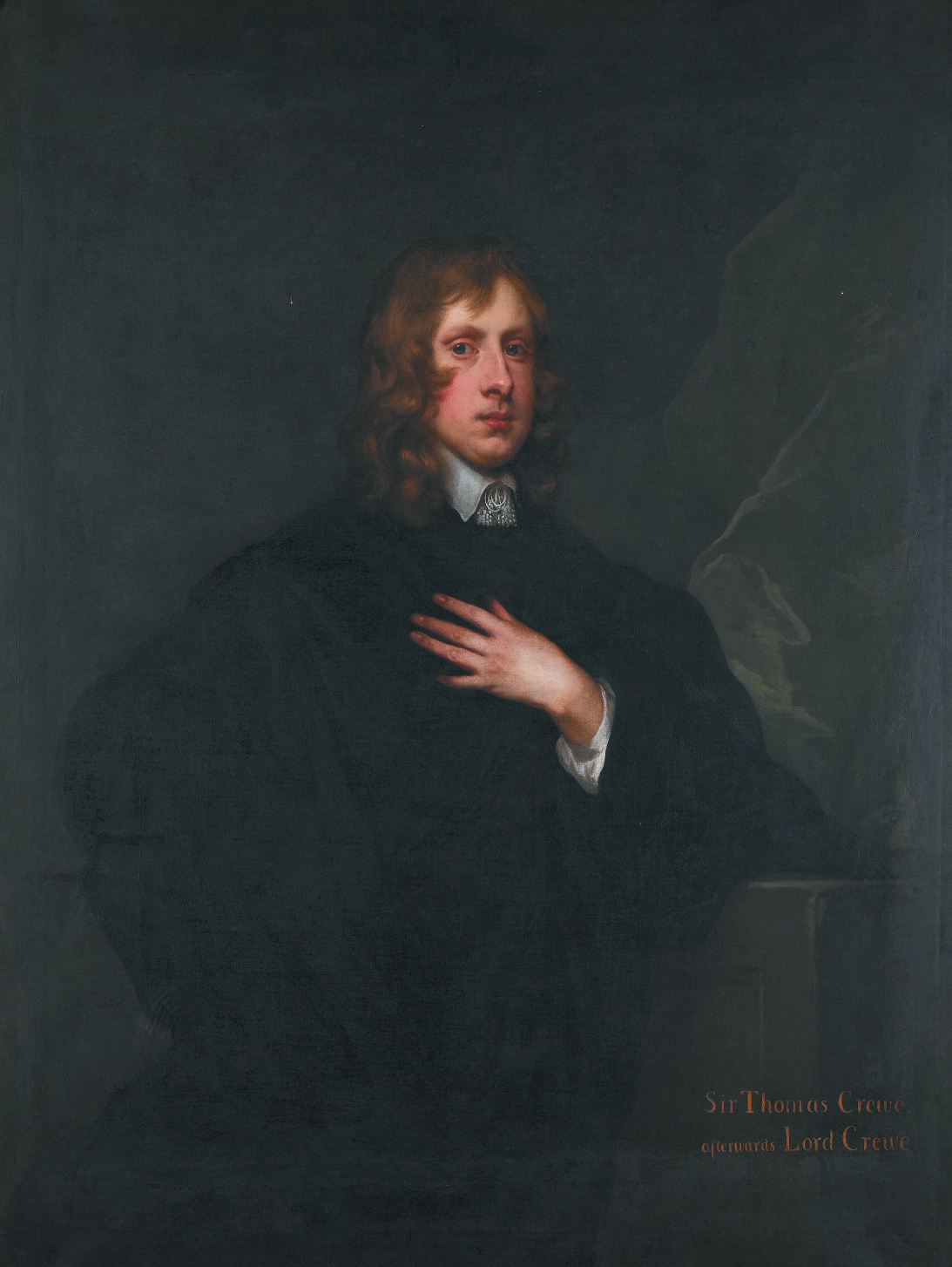
Thomas Crew, 2nd Baron Crew of Stene (1624-1697) (Peter Lely)

Thomas Crew, 2nd Baron Crew (1624 – 30 November 1697) of Steane, Northamptonshire was an English politician who sat in the House of Commons at various times between 1654 and 1679, when he inherited the peerage Baron Crew.

== Life ==
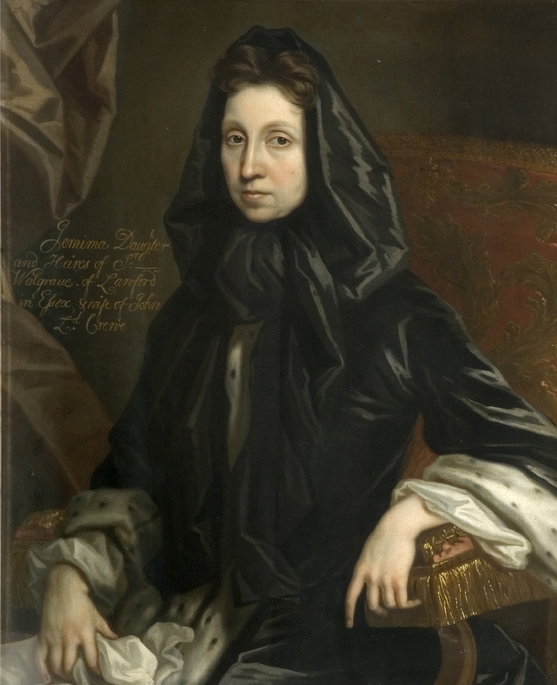
Jemima Waldegrave, Thomas Crew's mother

Crew was the son of John Crew, 1st Baron Crew and his wife Jemima Waldegrave, daughter of Edward Waldegrave of Lawford Hall, Essex. He was a student of Gray's Inn in 1641 and was studying in Padua in 1647.

In 1656, Crew was elected Member of Parliament for Northamptonshire in the Second Protectorate Parliament. He was elected MP for Brackley in 1659 for the Third Protectorate Parliament.

In 1660, Crew was elected MP for Brackley in the Convention Parliament. He was re-elected MP for Brackley in the Cavalier Parliament in 1661. In 1679 he inherited the barony on the death of his father.

Crew died at the age of 73. As he had no male issue, his fortune was devolved upon his daughters as co-heiresses, while the barony passed to his brother, Rev. Nathaniel Crew.

== Family ==
Crew married firstly Mary Townshend, the eldest daughter of Sir Roger Townshend, 1st Baronet of Raynham, Norfolk, by whom he had surviving issue:

- Anne Crew (d. bef 1696), married to John Jolliff Esq., of Coston.
- Temperance Crew (d. 18 October 1728), married firstly to Rowland, son and heir of Sir Alston Bart of Odell and secondly to Sir John Wolstenholme, 3rd Baronet of Enfield.

Crew married secondly in 1674, Anne, daughter and co-heiress of Sir William Armine, 2nd Baronet. By her, he had four daughters:

- Jemima Crew (d. 2 July 1728), married to Henry Grey, 1st Duke of Kent.
- Armine Crew (d. 1728), married to Thomas Cartwright, Esq.
- Catherine Crew, married to Sir John Harpur, 4th Baronet of Caulk. Their great-grandson Sir Henry Harpur, 7th Baronet, assumed by royal permission the surname of Crew only. His descendants would eventually settle upon the surname of Harpur-Crewe.
- Elizabeth Crew (d. 21 May 1756), married on 18 September 1721, to Charles Butler, 1st Earl of Arran. The marriage was childless.

Parliament of England
Preceded by Sir Gilbert Pickering, Bt Thomas Brooke; John Crew; Sir John Norwich, Bt; John Claypole, senior Sir John Dryden, Bt	Member of Parliament for Northamptonshire; 1656; With: Sir Gilbert Pickering, Bt; John, Lord Claypole; William Boteler; James Langham; Alexander Blake	Succeeded by Richard Knightley; Philip Holman
Preceded by Not represented in Second Protectorate Parliament	Member of Parliament for Brackley; 1659; With: William Lisle	Succeeded by Not represented in restored Rump
Peerage of England
Preceded by John Crew	Baron Crew; 1679–1697	Succeeded by Nathaniel Crew
