= Richard Raynsford =

English judge and politician

Sir Richard Rainsford
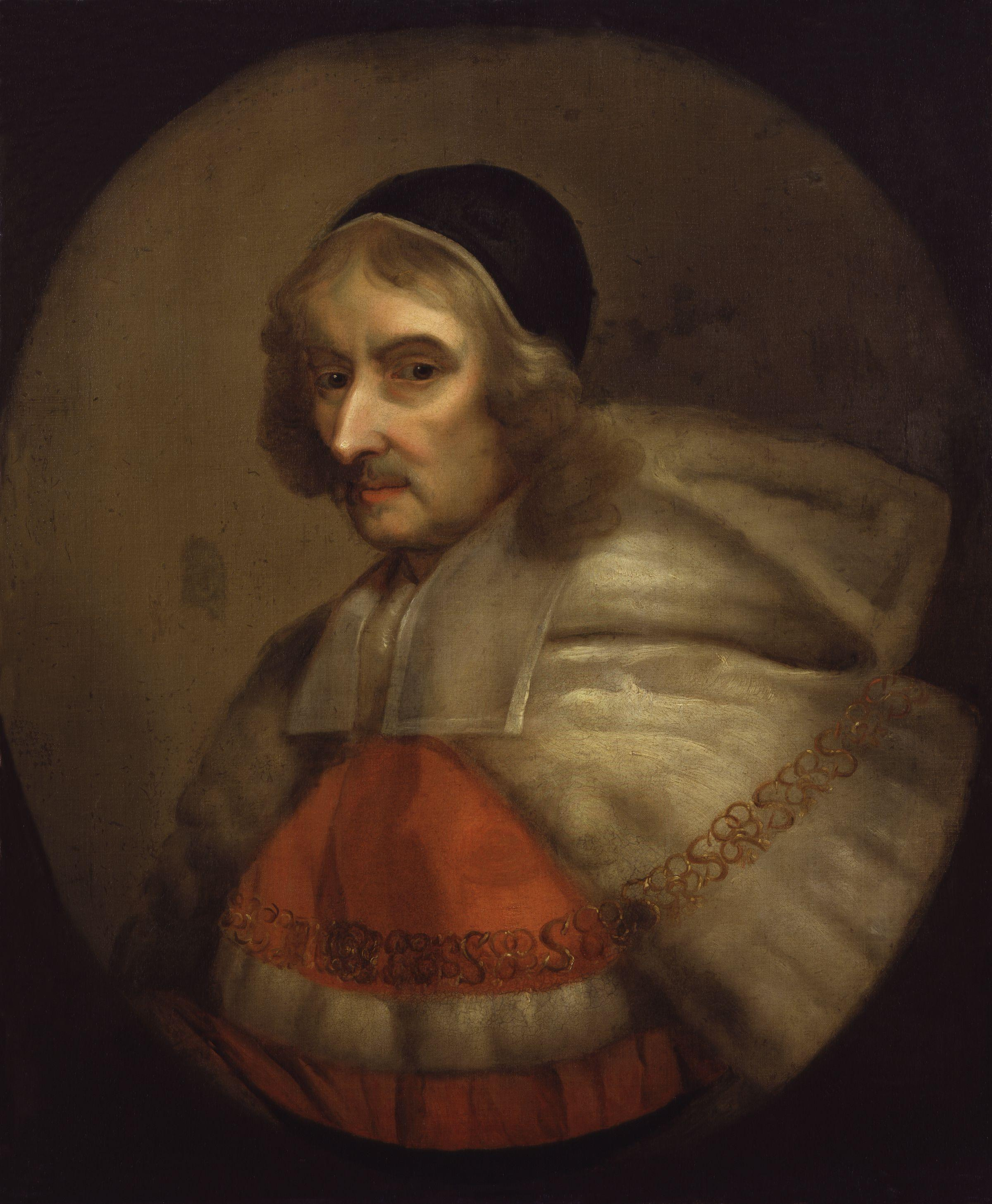
- Born: c. 1605 Northamptonshire England
- Died: 17 February 1680 (aged 74); Dallington, Northamptonshire
- Resting place: Dallington Church Northamptonshire
- Education: Exeter College, Oxford
- Occupation: English Judge ( 1650-1678 ) Politician MP House of Commons(1660-63)
- Known for: Chief Justice of the King's Bench, Treasurer of Lincoln's Inn London Member of the projected order of Knights of the Royal Oak MP for Northampton in 1661 for the Cavalier Parliament Judge on Fire of London Disputes Act 1666 at Clifford's Inn in 1667 and 1672 President and Supervisor in Ireland in 1661-62 for the Act of Settlement 1662 in Ireland.

Sir Richard Rainsford SL (c. 1605–1680) was an English judge and politician who sat in the House of Commons between 1660 and 1663. He became Chief Justice of the King's Bench.

== Career ==
Rainsford was the second son of Robert Raynsford of Staverton, Northamptonshire and his second wife Mary Kirton, daughter of Thomas Kirton of Thorpe Mandeville Northamptonshire. He matriculated at Exeter College, Oxford on 13 December 1622, but left the university without a degree. He was knighted by 1622. In 1630 he was elected recorder of Daventry, being then a student of Lincoln's Inn, where he was called to the bar on 16 October 1632. In 1653 he was chosen recorder of Northampton.

Rainsford was elected Member of Parliament for Northampton in April 1660 for the Convention Parliament. In 1660 he became treasurer of Lincoln's Inn and on 26 October 1660 he was sworn serjeant-at-law. He was one of those designated a member of the projected order of Knights of the Royal Oak. He was re-elected MP for Northampton in 1661 for the Cavalier Parliament, and sat until 16 November 1663 when he was raised to the bench as Baron of the Exchequer. He presided over the commission which sat at Dublin during the earlier months of 1663 to supervise the execution of the Act of Settlement 1662, and on his return to England was raised to the exchequer bench, 16 November the same year.

Rainsford was one of Sir Matthew Hale's colleagues in the commission which sat at Clifford's Inn between 1667 and 1672, under the Fire of London Disputes Act 1666 to determine the legal questions arising out of the rebuilding of the quarters of London destroyed by the great fire. In the meantime he was transferred to the king's bench, 6 February 1669, and on 12 April 1676 he succeeded Hale as Chief Justice of the King's Bench. On the return to Lord Shaftesbury's writ of habeas corpus he decided, 29 June 1677, an important point of constitutional law, viz. that the courts of law have no jurisdiction, during the parliamentary session, to discharge a peer committed by order of the House of Lords, even though the warrant of commitment be such as would be void if issued by an ordinary tribunal. Raynsford was removed to make room for Sir William Scroggs in June 1678.

Rainsford died on 17 February 1680 at Dallington, Northamptonshire, where he had his seat and founded an almshouse. His remains were interred in Dallington church.

== Family ==
Raynsford married at Kingsthorpe, on 30 May 1637, Catherine, daughter of Rev. Samuel Clerke, D.D., rector of St. Peter's, Northampton, who survived him, and died on 1 June 1698. By her he had, with five daughters, six sons. Most of his children died early. His eldest son, Richard, matriculated at Queen's College, Oxford, on 15 June 1657, represented Northampton in the first parliament of James II, 1685–7, and died on 17 March 1702/3. His grand daughter Rebecca Brompton married John Garth MP who represented Devizes.

His brother, Edward Rainsford, was one of the first European settlers on Rainsford Island in Boston Harbor, Massachusetts.

Raynsford's portrait, by Gerard Soest, is at Lincoln's Inn; another, by Michael Wright, is at the Guildhall; a third, by Claret, was engraved by Tompson.

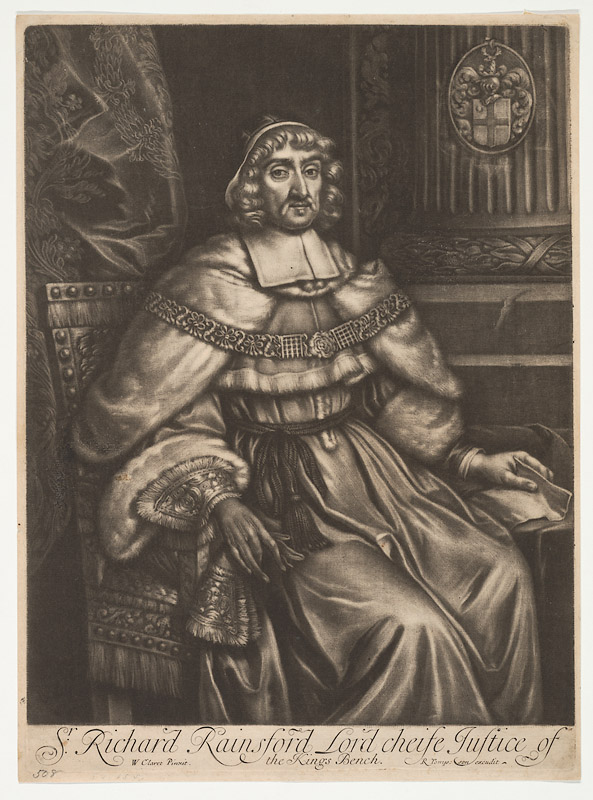
Richard Raynsford.

== Bibliography ==
- http://www.lisburn.com/books/historical_society/volume9/volume9-5.html

Parliament of England
Constituency unrepresented	Member of Parliament for Northampton; 1660–1661; With: Francis Harvey 1660; Sir John Norwich, Bt 1660–1661	Succeeded by Francis Harvey; James Langham
Preceded by Francis Harvey; James Langham	Member of Parliament for Northampton; 1661–1664; With: Sir Charles Compton 1661–1662; Sir James Langham, Bt 1662–1663; Sir William Dudley, Bt 1663; Christopher Hatton 1663–1664	Succeeded by Christopher Hatton; Sir John Bernard
Legal offices
Preceded by Sir Matthew Hale	Lord Chief Justice; 1676–1678	Succeeded by Sir William Scroggs
