= Sir John Dryden, 2nd Baronet =

English politician

Sir John Dryden, 2nd Baronet (c. 1580 – c. 1658) was an English politician who sat in the House of Commons in two periods between 1640 and 1654.

Dryden was the son of Sir Erasmus Dryden, 1st Baronet and his wife Frances Wilkes, daughter of William Wilkes of Hodnel, Warwickshire. In 1632, he succeeded to the baronetcy on the death of his father. He was High Sheriff of Northamptonshire in 1634.

In November 1640, Dryden was elected Member of Parliament for Northamptonshire in the Long Parliament. In 1654, he was re-elected MP for Northamptonshire in the First Protectorate Parliament.

Dryden married firstly Priscilla Quarles, daughter of James Quarles of Romford Essex, and sister of the poet Francis Quarles, and secondly Anne Parvis, daughter of Henry Parvis of Ruckholts, Essex. He had no children from his first two wives. He married thirdly Honor Bevill, daughter of Sir Robert Bevill, of Chesterton, and by her had a family. His eldest son Robert succeeded to the baronetcy. Dryden was an uncle of the poet John Dryden.

Parliament of England
Preceded by John Crew, 1st Baron Crew	Member of Parliament for Northamptonshire; 1640–1653; With: Sir Gilbert Pickering, 1st Baronet	Succeeded by Sir Gilbert Pickering, 1st Baronet; Thomas Brooke
Preceded by Sir Gilbert Pickering, 1st Baronet; Thomas Brooke	Member of Parliament for Northamptonshire; 1654; With: Sir Gilbert Pickering, 1st Baronet; John Crew, 1st Baron Crew; Thomas Brooke; Sir John Norwich, 1st Baronet; John Claypole	Succeeded by Sir Gilbert Pickering, 1st Baronet; John Claypole; William Boteler; Sir James Langham, 2nd Baronet; Thomas Crew
Baronetage of England
Preceded by Erasmus Dryden	Baronet (of Canons-Ashby); 1632–c.1658	Succeeded by Robert Dryden
