= John Crew, 1st Baron Crew =

English lawyer and politician (1598–1679)

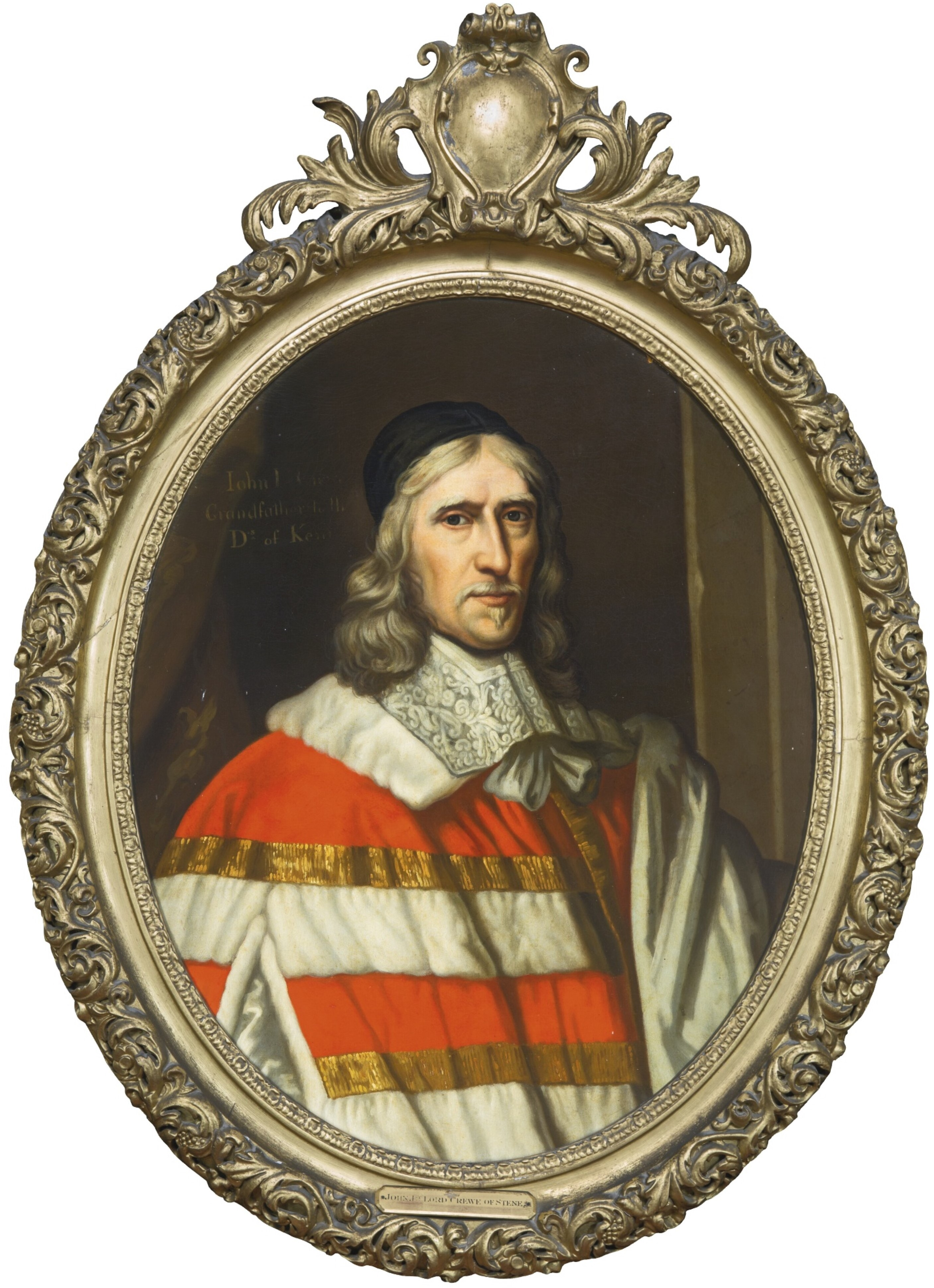
Portrait of John, 1st Lord Crew of Stene

John Crew, 1st Baron Crew of Stene (1598 – 12 December 1679) was an English lawyer and politician, who sat in the House of Commons at various times between 1624 and 1660. He was a Puritan and sided with the Parliamentary cause during the Civil War. He was raised to a peerage as Baron Crew by Charles II after the Restoration.

== Career ==
Crew was the son of Sir Thomas Crew of Nantwich, Cheshire and Steane and his wife Temperance Bray, daughter of Reynold Bray of Steane. His father was Speaker of the House of Commons from 1623 to 1625. Crew entered Gray's Inn in 1615 and matriculated at Magdalen College, Oxford on 26 April 1616, aged 18. He was called to the bar in 1624.

In 1624, Crew was elected Member of Parliament for Amersham and was re-elected in 1625. He was elected MP for Brackley in 1626. In 1628 he was elected MP for Banbury and sat until 1629 when King Charles decided to rule without parliament for eleven years.

In April 1640, Crew was elected MP for Brackley in the Short Parliament. He was elected MP for Northamptonshire in November 1640 for the Long Parliament. He voted against the attainder of Strafford, but supported Parliament when Civil War came, although he was a moderate, suspicious of the Army and supported the Self-Denying Ordinance. He was chosen chairman of the Commons Committee on Religion, was one of the parliamentary commissioners sent to negotiate with the Royalists at Uxbridge in 1645, and was one of those entrusted with the custody of the King at Holdenby House after the Scots handed him over to Parliament in 1647. However, the following year the army leaders, knowing that he would oppose the trial of the King, had him arrested and he was excluded from his parliamentary seat in Pride's Purge. He returned to the Commons as MP for Northamptonshire in 1654 for the First Protectorate Parliament but was once again excluded by the government. Despite this, he was summoned by the Lord Protector to sit in his new House of Lords, which first met in 1658. After the collapse of the restored Rump he resumed his seat in the briefly resurrected unpurged House, then was elected once more for Northamptonshire in the Convention Parliament. He was appointed to the Council of State, and was one of the delegation sent to meet Charles II at The Hague and arrange his return to the throne.

On 20 April 1661, Crew was created Baron Crew of Stene in recognition of his efforts to promote the Restoration, and thereafter retired from active politics. A wealthy man, he had bought a large house in Lincoln's Inn Fields during the 1650s, and was a well-regarded host; Samuel Pepys, who was a retainer and poor relation of his son-in-law Edward Montagu and mentions him many times in his diaries, was a frequent guest.

Crew died in 1679 and was buried at Steane, Northamptonshire.

== Family ==
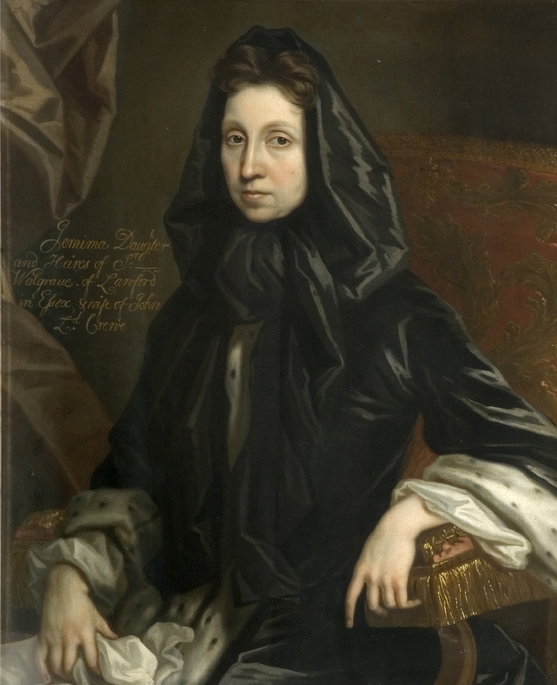
John Crew married Jemima Waldegrave (pictured), with whom he had several children.

Crew married Jemima Waldegrave, daughter of Edward Waldegrave of Lawford Hall in Essex. Their children included:

- Sir Thomas Crew (1624–1697), who succeeded his father in the peerage but died without male issue
- Rev. Nathaniel Crew (1633–1721), Bishop of Durham, who succeeded his older brother as 3rd Baron
- Jemima, Countess of Sandwich (1625–1674), who married Edward Montagu, later Earl of Sandwich, in 1642.
- Anne, who married Sir Henry Wright, 1st Baronet, of Dagenham, Essex.
- Reverend Samuel Crew, died in 1660.

Parliament of England
Constituency disenfranchised 1307–1624	Member of Parliament for Amersham; 1624–1625; With: William Hakewill 1624; Francis Drake 1625	Succeeded by William Clarke; Francis Drake
Preceded by Sir Thomas Wenman; Edward Spencer	Member of Parliament for Brackley; 1626; With: Sir John Hobart	Succeeded by Sir Thomas Wenman; John Curzon
Preceded by Calcot Chambre	Member of Parliament for Banbury; 1628–1629	Parliament suspended until 1640
Vacant Parliament suspended since 1629	Member of Parliament for Northamptonshire; 1640; With: Sir Gilbert Pickering, Bt	Succeeded by Sir Gilbert Pickering, Bt; Sir John Dryden, Bt
Vacant Parliament suspended since 1629	Member of Parliament for Brackley; 1640–1648; With: Sir Martin Lister	Unrepresented after Pride's Purge
Preceded by Sir Gilbert Pickering, Bt; Thomas Brooke	Member of Parliament for Northamptonshire; 1654–1655; With: Sir Gilbert Pickering, Bt; Sir John Norwich, Bt; John Claypole; Sir John Dryden, Bt; Thomas Brooke	Succeeded by Sir Gilbert Pickering, Bt; John Claypole; William Boteler; James Langham; Thomas Crew; Alexander Blake
Preceded by Sir Gilbert Pickering, Bt	Member of Parliament for Northamptonshire; 1660; With: Sir Henry Yelverton, Bt	Succeeded by Sir Justinian Isham, Bt; George Clerke
Peerage of England
New creation	Baron Crew; 1661–1679	Succeeded by Thomas Crew
