= Thomas Crew =

Thomas Crew or Crewe may refer to:

- Thomas Crew, 2nd Baron Crew (1624–1697), English politician
- Thomas Crewe (1565–1634), English Member of Parliament and lawyer
- Thomas Crewe (died 1418), MP for Warwickshire (UK Parliament constituency)
