= Francis Harvey (MP for Northampton) =

English lawyer and politician

Francis Harvey (1611–1703) was an English lawyer and politician who sat in the House of Commons at various times between 1656 and 1661.

Harvey was the son of William Harvey of Weston Favell, Northamptonshire and was baptised on 20 December 1611. He matriculated at St Edmund Hall, Oxford on 19 October 1627, aged 14 and was awarded B.A. on 11 June 1629. He was called to the bar at Middle Temple in 1637.

In 1656, Harvey was elected Member of Parliament for Northampton in the Second Protectorate Parliament. He was re-elected MP for Northampton in 1659 for the Third Protectorate Parliament.

In 1660, Harvey was elected MP for Northampton in the Convention Parliament but was unseated on petition on 21 Jun 1660. He was re-elected in 1661 for the Cavalier Parliament in a double return. He was seated on 22 May 1661, but the election was declared void on 13 Jun 1661. He was treasurer of his Inn in 1667.

Harvey died at the age of 91. He was buried in the Temple church on 30 March 1703.

Harvey married Elizabeth Dickens, widow of St. Olave, Hart Street, London in 1665.

Parliament of England
Preceded by Peter Whalley	Member of Parliament for Northampton; 1654–1659; With: James Langham	Succeeded by Not represented in restored Rump
Preceded by Not represented in restored Rump	Member of Parliament for Northampton; 1660; With: Richard Rainsford	Succeeded by Richard Rainsford; Sir John Norwich, 1st Baronet
Preceded by Richard Rainsford; Sir John Norwich, 1st Baronet	Member of Parliament for Northampton; 1661; With: James Langham	Succeeded by Richard Rainsford; Sir Charles Compton
