= John Copleston =

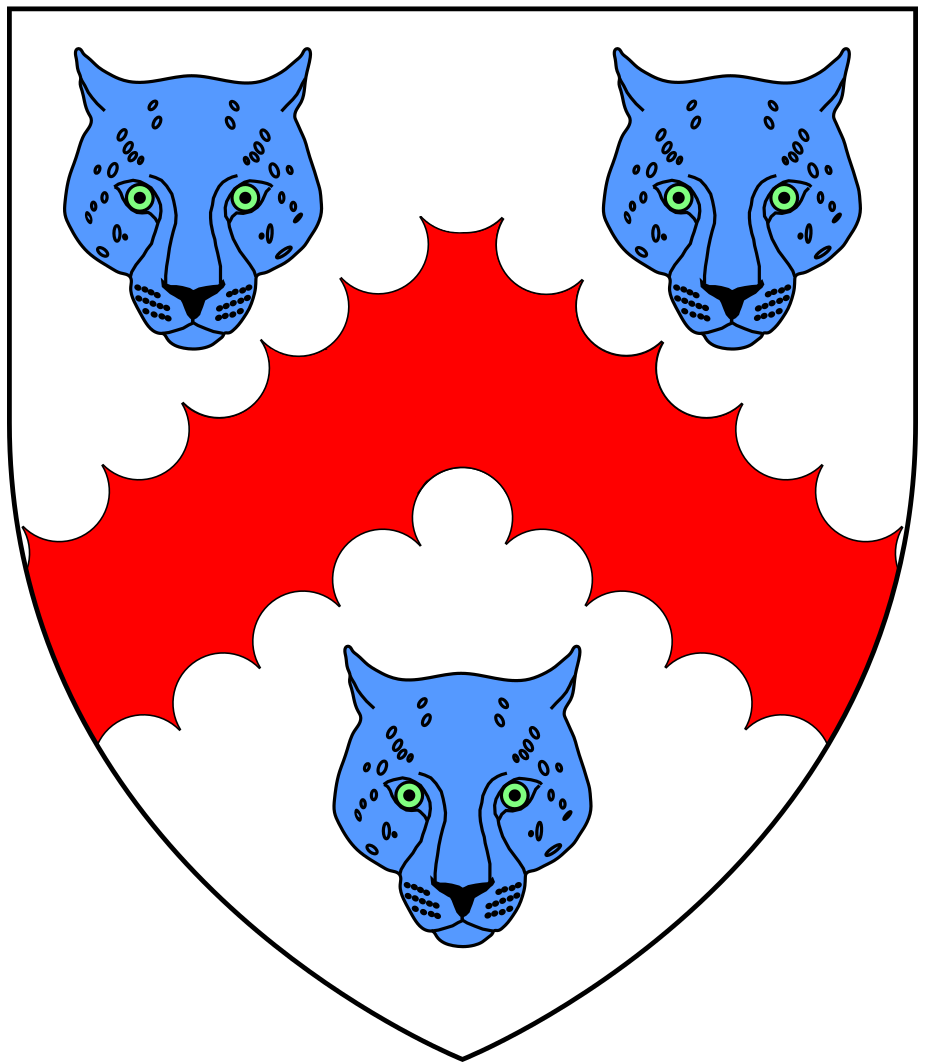
Arms of Copleston: Argent, a chevron engrailed gules between three lion's faces azure

John Copleston was a 17th-century English army officer, a supporter of the Parliamentary cause in the English Civil War and Interregnum (England)

== Biography ==
John Copleston was a younger branch of the numerous family of that name in Devonshire, all of whom sprung from the Copplestone, in that county. Copleston lived at Pynes House, near Exeter, which he inherited from his grandfather.

He engaged in the service of Parliament, although others of his name and family were Royalists. He commanded a regiment many years, and served in Ireland under Philip, Lord Lisle, during the years 1646 and 1647. He was Sheriff of Devon in 1655, and, having a regiment also under his command, was active in the support of Cromwell's government, especially during Penruddock's Uprising. For his service he was knighted at Whitehall on 1 June 1655 by the Lord Protector Oliver Cromwell. He afterwards sat in the Second and Third Protectorate parliaments for Barnstaple.
