= Richard Combe =

Richard Combe may refer to:

- Sir Richard Combe (c. 1630 – after 1675), knighted by Oliver Cromwell and again by Charles II
- Richard Combe (MP), member of the British Parliament for Milborne Port (1772) and Aldeburgh (1774)
