= John Norwich =

John Norwich may refer to:

- John Julius Norwich, 2nd Viscount Norwich, (1929–2018), English historian, travel writer and television personality
- Sir John Norwich, 1st Baronet (1613–1661), MP
