= John Claypole of Northborough =

English MP and Roundhead in Civil War (1595–1660)

John Claypole was an English politician who sat in the House of Commons in 1654. He supported the Parliamentary cause in the English Civil War.

== Biography ==
Claypole was the son of Adam Claypole of Lolham Hall, Maxey, Northamptonshire, and his wife Dorothy Wingfield, daughter of Robert Wingfield, of Upton, near Castor, Northamptonshire and his wife Elizabeth Cecil, who was sister to William Cecil, 1st Baron Burghley. His name was spelt in a great variety of ways, including Cleypole, Cleypoole, Chappole, Clappoole, Claipol, and Claypole.

In 1637 Claypole was summoned as a gentleman before the Star Chamber, and the attorney-general was ordered to begin a prosecution against him for refusing to pay ship money. He declared for the Parliament at the start of the Civil War in 1643, and in 1644, he was appointed one of their assessors for the county of Northampton.

In 1654, Claypole was elected Member of Parliament for Northamptonshire in the First Protectorate Parliament. He may have been High Sheriff of Northamptonshire in 1655, as major-general William Boteler recommends him to John Thurloe, in a letter to him, dated 16 November.

Claypole was created a baronet by the Protector on 16 July 1657. Also in 1657, he was made a commissioner with his son, for levying the taxes upon the county of Northampton; to distinguish them, he is called "John Claypole, esq. senior", and his son "Lord Claypole".

== Family ==
Claypole married Mary Angell, the daughter of a wealthy London merchant. They had fourteen children, one of whom was John (1625–1688) who married a daughter of Oliver Cromwell. James (1634–1687) another son, became a merchant, emigrated to Pennsylvania becoming a prominent member of the colony.

Parliament of England
Preceded by Sir Gilbert Pickering, 1st Baronet; Thomas Brooke	Member of Parliament for Northamptonshire; 1654; With: Sir Gilbert Pickering, 1st Baronet; Thomas Brooke; John Crew; Sir John Norwich, 1st Baronet; Sir John Dryden, 2nd Baronet	Succeeded by Sir Gilbert Pickering, 1st Baronet; William Boteler; Thomas Crew; John Lord Claypole; Alexander Blake; James Langham
