= Griffith Williams =

Griffith Williams may refer to:

- Griffith Williams (bishop) (c. 1589–1672), Anglican bishop of Ossory
- Sir Griffith Williams, 1st Baronet (died 1663), Sheriff of Carnarvonshire
- Griffith Williams (Gutyn Peris) (1769–1838), Welsh bard

== See also ==
- John Griffith Williams (born 1944), Welsh High Court judge
