= William Boteler =

British politician

Member of Parliament for Northamptonshire
- In office 1656-1658

Member of Parliament for Bedford
- In office April 1640-?

Personal details
- Born: Barnwell, Northamptonshire, England
- Military career
- Branch: New Model Army
- Rank: Commander
- Battles / wars: English Civil War

William Boteler (fl. 1640s and 1650s) was a member of the Parliament of England. After the English Civil War, he was appointed Major-General for Bedfordshire, Huntingdonshire, Northamptonshire and Rutland during the Rule of the Major-Generals.

== Early life ==
He was born in Barnwell, Northamptonshire, the son of Noel or Neville Boteler; Ivan Roots considers that the clergyman Edward Boteler (died 1670) was his brother.

== Political career ==
In April 1640, Boteler was elected MP for Bedford in the Short Parliament in a double return and was taken off. He became a Colonel of Horse (cavalry) in the New Model Army. He was zealous and uncompromising in his hostility to his religious and political enemies, and was a severe persecutor of Quakers in Northamptonshire. In 1656 he advocated that James Nayler should be stoned to death for blasphemy. Boteler was also aggressive in his persecution of Royalists in his area, unlawfully imprisoning the Earl of Northampton for failing to pay his taxes.

Boteler represented Bedford in the First Protectorate Parliament, and he represented Northamptonshire in the Second Protectorate Parliament from 1656 to 1658. Early in 1658, Boteler replaced William Packer as commander of Cromwell's regiment of horse.

== Legal problems ==
Boteler was not returned to Third Protectorate Parliament in 1659, and his record as a Major-General in Northamptonshire, et al., was severely attacked, he was nearly impeached, by MPs in that Parliament. At the Restoration he was declared exempt from pardon, making him liable for legal punishment, but he was not prosecuted. He lived at Oatlands Park, Walton-on-Thames and became a lawyer. In 1665, he was arrested on suspicion of plotting against Charles II, and, ironically, was arrested in 1670 for attending an unlawful prayer meeting. The date of his death is not known.

== Notes ==
Parliament of England
Preceded by Sir Gilbert Pickering, Bt; John Crew; Sir John Norwich, Bt; John Claypole, senior Sir John Dryden, Bt	Member of Parliament for Northamptonshire; 1640; With: Sir Gilbert Pickering, Bt; John, Lord Claypole; James Langham; Thomas Crew; Alexander Blake	Succeeded by Richard Knightley; Philip Holman
