= Nathaniel Crew, 3rd Baron Crew =

British bishop; (1633–1721)

The Right Reverend and Right Honourable The Lord Crew
- Bishop of Durham
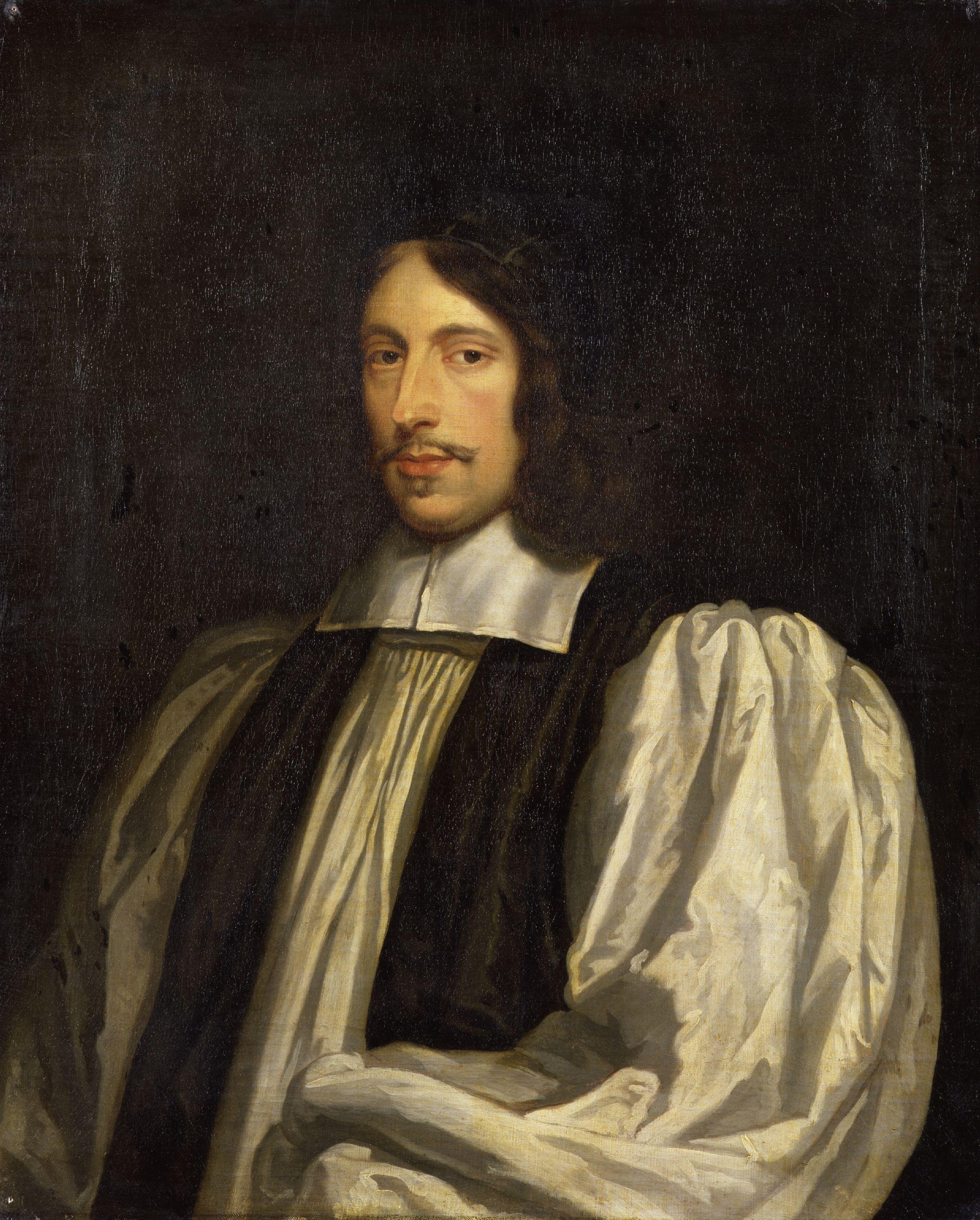
- Oil painting of Crew as Bishop of Durham.
- Diocese: Diocese of Durham
- In office: 1674–1721 (death)
- Predecessor: John Cosin
- Successor: William Talbot
- Other posts: Dean of Chichester (1669–1671); Clerk of the Closet (1669–1688); Bishop of Oxford (1671–1674); Dean of the Chapel Royal (1685–1688)

Orders
- Ordination: Lent 1665 (deacon & priest)
- Consecration: 2 July 1671 by Gilbert Sheldon

Personal details
- Born: 31 January 1633 Steane, Northamptonshire, England
- Died: 18 September 1721 (aged 88) Steane, Northamptonshire, Great Britain
- Buried: Steane Park, Northamptonshire
- Denomination: Anglican
- Residence: Steane Park, Northamptonshire (inherited); Newbold Verdon, Leicestershire (inherited)
- Parents: John Crew, 1st Baron Crew & Jemima (née Waldegrave)
- Spouse: 1. Penelope (m. 1691–1699); 2. Dorothy (m. 1700–1715)
- Education: Lincoln College, Oxford

Nathaniel Crew, 3rd Baron Crew (31 January 1633 – 18 September 1721) was Bishop of Oxford from 1671 to 1674, then Bishop of Durham from 1674 to 1721. As such he was one of the longest-serving bishops of the Church of England.

Crew was the son of John Crew, 1st Baron Crew and a grandson of Thomas Crewe, Speaker of the House of Commons. He was educated at Lincoln College, Oxford; ordained deacon and priest on the same day in Lent 1665; and appointed Rector of the college in 1668. He became dean and precentor of Chichester on 29 April 1669, Clerk of the Closet to Charles II shortly afterwards (holding that post until the Glorious Revolution in December 1688).

He was elected Bishop of Oxford in April 1671 and Bishop of Durham on 18 August 1674. He owed his rapid promotions to the Duke of York (later James VII & II), whose favour he had gained by secretly encouraging the duke's interest in the Roman Catholic Church. Crew baptised the Duke's daughter Princess Catherine in 1675 and was made a Privy Counsellor on 26 April 1676 He was present at the crucial Privy Council meeting in October 1678 where Titus Oates first revealed his great fabrication, the Popish Plot.

After the accession of James II, Crew was also appointed Dean of the Chapel Royal on 28 December 1685, staying in post until 1688. He was part of the ecclesiastical commission of 1686, which suspended Henry Compton, Bishop of London (for refusing to suspend John Sharp, then rector of St Giles's-in-the-Fields, whose anti-papal writings had rendered him obnoxious to the king) and Crew shared the administration of the see of London with Thomas Sprat, Bishop of Rochester. On the decline of King James's power, Crew dissociated himself from the court, and made a bid for the favour of William III's new government by voting for the motion that James had abdicated. He was excepted from the general pardon of 1690, but afterwards was allowed to retain his see.

His tenure as Bishop of Durham saw the first two new parishes to be erected in England since the Reformation. These were at Stockton-on-Tees in 1712 and Sunderland. The Church of the Holy Trinity in Sunderland, now redundant, was the base for responsible local government in the growing port town for the first time since the Borough of Sunderland, created by the Bishops of Durham, was crushed by Oliver Cromwell in the English Civil War.

From 1681 to 1688 Crew lived at 43 King Street, Covent Garden. He died in 1721. Crew had married twice: firstly to Penelope Frowde on 21 December 1691; then, after Penelope's death in 1699, secondly to Dorothy Forster on 23 July 1700. Dorothy died in 1715. In 1697, Crew succeeded his brother Thomas as the 3rd Baron Crew, but had no children and thus the barony became extinct upon his death.

== Legacy ==
He left large estates to be devoted to charitable ends, and his benefaction to Lincoln College and to Oxford University is commemorated in the annual Creweian Oration.

His memory is also perpetuated in The Lord Crewe Arms Hotel at Blanchland, whose community Crew rebuilt. Crew bought the village in 1708 and on his death in 1721 it passed to his trust, which remains the landlord.

Crew also furnished the chapel of Steane Park, Northamptonshire, of which he was the owner (having inherited the Steane estate with the Crew barony).

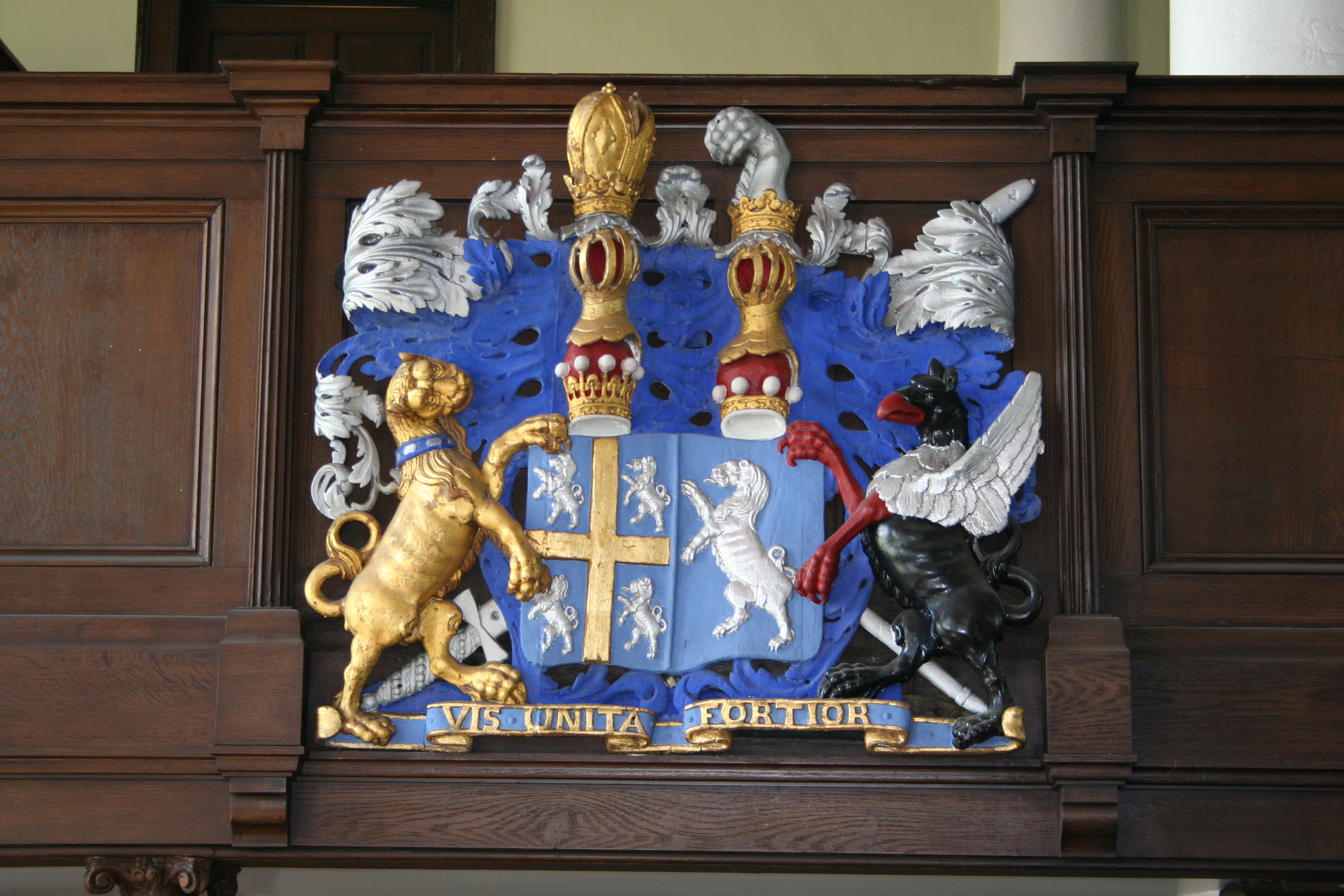
Crew's arms as Bishop of Durham Both his coronet as a Baron and the Bishop of Durham's Earl's coronet are shown

Much vilified by the Whig school of historians, Crewe's contributions are now more fully appreciated. Samuel Pepys thought well of him, praising, in particular, his grave and decent manner of preaching:

Dr. Crew did make a very pretty, neat, sober, honest sermon; and delivered it very readily, decently, and gravely, beyond his years: so as I was exceedingly taken with it, and I believe the whole chappell, he being but young; but his manner of his delivery I do like exceedingly.

— The diary of Samuel Pepys, 3 April 1667

== Styles and titles ==
- 1633–1661: Nathaniel Crew Esq.
- 1661–1665: The Honourable Nathaniel Crew
- 1665–1669: The Reverend and Honourable Nathaniel Crew
- 1669–1671: The Very Reverend and Honourable Nathaniel Crew
- 1671–1676: The Right Reverend and Honourable Nathaniel Crew
- 1676–1697: The Right Reverend and Right Honourable Nathaniel Crew
- 1697–1721: The Right Reverend and Right Honourable Lord Crew PC

Academic offices
Church of England titles
Preceded by Paul Hood	Rector of Lincoln College, Oxford; 1668–1672	Succeeded by Thomas Marshall
Preceded by Joseph Gulston	Dean of Chichester; 1669 –1671	Succeeded by Lambrocus Thomas
Preceded by Walter Blandford	Bishop of Oxford; 1671–1674	Succeeded by Henry Compton
Preceded by John Cosin	Bishop of Durham; 1674–1721	Succeeded by William Talbot
Honorary titles
Preceded by in commission	Lord Lieutenant of Durham; 1674–1689	Succeeded by Richard Lumley, 2nd Viscount Lumley (became Earl of Scarbrough)
Preceded by Richard Lumley, 1st Earl of Scarbrough	Vice-Admiral of Durham; 1702–1710	Succeeded by Richard Lumley, 1st Earl of Scarbrough (again)
Preceded by Richard Lumley, 1st Earl of Scarbrough	Lord Lieutenant of Durham; 1712–1714	Succeeded by Richard Lumley, 1st Earl of Scarbrough (again)
Peerage of England
Preceded by Thomas Crew	Baron Crew; 1697–1721	Extinct
