= Baron Crew =

Extinct barony in the Peerage of England

Arms of Crew: Azure, a lion rampant argent

Baron Crew, of Stene in the County of Northampton, was a title in the Peerage of England. It was created on 20 April 1661 for the politician John Crew. He was the son of Sir Thomas Crewe, Speaker of the House of Commons. Lord Crew was succeeded by his eldest son, the second Baron. He sat as Member of Parliament for Northamptonshire and Brackley. On his death the title passed to his younger brother, the third Baron. He was Bishop of Oxford and Bishop of Durham. The title became extinct on his death in 1721.

Sir Ranulph Crewe, uncle of the first Baron, was the ancestor (through the female line) of John Crewe, 1st Baron Crewe (see Baron Crewe).

== Barons Crew (1661) ==
- John Crew, 1st Baron Crew (1598–1679)
- Thomas Crew, 2nd Baron Crew (1624–1697)
- Nathaniel Crew, 3rd Baron Crew (1633–1721)

== See also ==
- Baron Crewe
- Baron Carew
