= Sir John Holman, 1st Baronet =

English politician

Sir John Holman, 1st Baronet (c. 1633 – 1700) was an English politician who sat in the House of Commons at various times between 1661 and 1685.

Holman was the son of Philip Holman of Warkworth, Northamptonshire and scrivener of London, and his wife Mary Barta of London. In 1661, he was elected Member of Parliament for Banbury in the Cavalier Parliament. He was knighted after April 1661 and was created baronet on 1 June 1663. In 1679 he was re-elected MP for Banbury for the First Exclusion Parliament and for the Second Exclusion Parliament. He was last elected MP for Banbury in 1681.

Holman died at the age of about 66 in or before May 1700.

Holman married Jane Fortrey daughter of Jacob de la Forterie (or Fortrey) merchant of London. They had no children and the baronetcy became extinct on his death.

Parliament of England
Preceded by Sir Anthony Cope, Bt	Member of Parliament for Banbury; 1661–1685	Succeeded by Sir Dudley North
Baronetage of England
New creation	Baronet (of Banbury); 1663–1700	Extinct
