= Sir Erasmus Dryden, 1st Baronet =

English politician

Sir Erasmus Dryden, 1st Baronet (20 December 1553 – 22 May 1632) was an English politician who sat in the House of Commons in 1624.

== Family ==
Erasmus Dryden was the son of John Dryden who built Canons Ashby House, Northamptonshire. Erasmus' mother, Elizabeth Cope, was the daughter of Sir John Cope, from whose heirs the Drydens purchased the priory and village remnants of the Canons Ashby estate. Sir Erasmus Dryden married Frances Wilkes, daughter of William Wilkes of Hodnell, Warwickshire. They had 3 sons and 4 daughters. His eldest son John succeeded to the Baronetcy.

Sir Erasmus Dryden was the grandfather of the poet and first Poet Laureate, John Dryden (through his third son, Erasmus) and he was also the uncle of Elizabeth (Dryden) Swift, who was the grandmother of Jonathan Swift.

Dryden's sister-in-law, Katherine (Throckmorton) Dryden, was a first cousin of Lady Elizabeth (Throckmorton) Raleigh. He was an uncle of female Puritan preacher Anne Hutchinson.

== Career ==
He entered Magdalen College, Oxford, in 1571 aged 18. and was demy from 1571 to 1575 and fellow from 1575 to 1580, being awarded BA on 11 June 1577. In 1577, he was student of the Middle Temple. He was High Sheriff of Northamptonshire in 1599 and in 1618. He was created a baronet on 16 November 1619. In 1624, Dryden was elected Member of Parliament for Banbury in the Happy Parliament.

Parliament of England
Preceded by Sir William Cope, 2nd Baronet	Member of Parliament for Banbury; 1624	Succeeded by Sir William Cope, 2nd Baronet
Baronetage of England
New creation	Baronet (of Canons Ashby); 1619–1632	Succeeded by John Dryden
