= Cromwell's Other House =

Upper house of UK parliament, 1657–1659

The Other House (also referred to as the Upper House, House of Peers and House of Lords), established by the Lord Protector Oliver Cromwell under the terms of the Humble Petition and Advice, was one of the two chambers of the parliaments that legislated for England and Wales, Scotland, and Ireland, in 1658 and 1659, the final years of the Protectorate. (Note: The Humble Partition states "to create the 'Other House,' the members to be such as should be nominated by his highness and approved by the commons". George Craik notes "The commonwealth-men, it appears, would tolerate neither the designation 'House of Lords.' nor that of 'Upper House.' The thing was, therefore, termed 'the Other House;' that branch of the legislature losing not less in real power than it lost in name or dignity: they were not to exceed seventy in number, nor to be less than forty, whereof one-and-twenty were to form a quorum; they were not to give any vote by proxy; on death or removal no new members were to be admitted to sit and vote but by consent of the House of Commons, &c." (Craik, MacFarlane & Knight 1856))

== History ==
During the Rule of the Major-Generals and the selection of members for the Second Protectorate Parliament there was a firming of opinion that a second chamber was needed.

During the debate over the Humble Petition and Advice, the Lord Protector, Oliver Cromwell, and others wanted an upper chamber as a check on the power of the Lower House because he had found it difficult to control over the Naylor case. He pushed for a second chamber which would consist of nominated members who, in Thurloe's words, would be "a great security and a bulwark to the common interest". On 11 March 1657 the House of Commons passed a bill creating a second house which would consist of up to 70 members nominated by the Lord Protector.

On 6 May 1657 Cromwell rejected the title of King as proposed in the draft version of the Humble Petition, but accepted a reworded Humble Petition on 25 May. It included provisions for him as Lord Protector, tri-annual parliaments and an Other House of 40 to 70 members nominated for life by the Lord Protector, with a quorum of 21. Thus the second house became a fixture of the Protectorate, cemented in place by the Humble Petition and Advice, a new written constitution.

The Judges of the Upper Bench, who at this time were Warburton and Newdigate; of the Common Bench, Atkins, Hale, and Wyndham; with Barons of the Exchequer, Nicholas, Parker and Hill, were summoned as assistants to the second chamber. (Note: For more details of these men see Noble Volume 1. Judges of the Upper Bench (Noble 1787, pp. 430–431); Judges of the Common Bench (Noble 1787, pp. 431–433); Barons of Exchequer (Noble 1787, pp. 433–435))

All the peers but one (Lord Eure) summoned to attend this second chamber declined to sit, and to show his contempt for them, Sir Arthur Hesilrige took his seat in the Commons as member for Leicester. So, filling the second house proved more difficult than creating it. Of the 63 nominees only 42 accepted and only 37 came to the first meeting.

Matters were made worse when Parliament reconvened on 20 January 1658. Republicans in the lower house attempted to kill off the second house before a name for the chamber had been decided upon. After five days of debate with no agreement on whether it should be called the 'House of Lords' or the 'Other House', Cromwell addressed both houses warning them that such disagreements encouraged Royalists and threatened the country with a new civil war. Parliament was in no mood to heed his warning and continued to disagree among themselves, so on 4 February 1658 Cromwell dissolved Parliament.

After Oliver Cromwell's death in September 1658, those in the funeral procession who had noble titles under the ancient regime were so called (for example Edward, Earl of Manchester); those who had sat in Cromwell's Other House were called lord (for example Philip, Lord Skipton), but those such as "George Monck, General in Scotland", who had not taken up their seats in the Other House, were not referred to as lord.

The Third Protectorate Parliament (27 January 1659 – 22 April 1659) included a second chamber, but republicans in the House of Commons treated it with suspicion as they considered some of the members to be Presbyterians and closet Royalists. Parliament was soon deadlocked and was dissolved by Richard Cromwell, the new Lord Protector, on the advice of the Army, when it became clear that the Commons was seeking ways to disband the Army. With that dissolution the Other House, that had come into existence in 1656, never reconvened.

== List of those nominated by Cromwell ==
Oliver, Lord Protector of the Commonwealth of England, Scotland, and Ireland, and the Domynions and Territories thereunto belonging. To our trusty and wellbeloved Sonne Lord Richard Cromwell, Greeting.—— Whereas by the advise and assent of our Councell for certain greate and weighty affaires concerning toe the state and defence of the saide Comonwealth, We ordayned our present parliament to be held at our City of Westminster, the seventeenth day of September, in the yeare of our Lorde one thousand six hundred fiftie and six, and there to consult and advise with the Knights, Citizens, and Burgesses of our said comonwealth, which Parliament was then and there held, and continued until the six and twentieth day of June last past, and then Adjourned until the twentieth day of January now next coming: Therefore we command and firmely enjoyne you, that considering the difficultie of the said affaires and eminent dangers, all excuses being left aside, you be personally present att Weftminster aforesaid the said twentieth day of January next comeinge, there to treate, conferr, and give your advise with us and with the Greate Men and Nobles in and concerninge the affaires aforesaid. And this as you Love and Honor our safety and the defence of the commonwealth aforefaid, you shall in noe wise omitt. Witness ourselfe at Westminster, the nynth day of December, in the yeare of our Lord one thousand six hundred fifty and seaven.

Lett the like writts be directed to the respective persons under written, dated as aforefaid (to wit) (Note: Then follow the names of the other lords, with the words "sworne" added to them, written with a different ink, a proof that it was put in after the names had been written; to prevent a needless repetition of the same word, this mark (§) is placed against such who had that word placed to their names, as it shows they complied with the writ of summons. At the end of the names is added, "This agreeth with the originall remayning in the Pettie Bag, John Thompſon:" there seems to have been a Seal appendant to it, and that it has been torn off. The persons are given the style of the person as in the original but Noble changed the orthography of both that and the names. (Noble 1787, p. 371 Citing: The Rev. Mr. Ayscough's catalogue of M.S.S. in the British Museum, no. 3246.))

sig	order	name	title	comments (Note: The text in the first three columns (although not headings) is taken from Cobbett 1808, pp. 1518, 1519 and Noble 1787, pp. 371–427 Citing: The Rev. Mr. Ayscough's catalogue of M.S.S. in the British Museum, no. 3246. The fourth and last column is an editorial comment and is not part of the original source.)
	1	The lord Richard Cromwell		The eldest surviving son of the Lord Protector Oliver.
	2	Lord Henry Cromwell	our deputy of Ireland.	The other surviving son of the Lord Protector.
§	3	Nathaniel Fiennes	one of the commissioners of our great-seal.	
§	4	John Lisle	one of the lords commissioners of our great-seal	
§	5	Henry Lawrence	president of our privy council	
§	6	Charles Fleetwood	lieutenant-general of our army	Son in-law to the Lord Protector.
	7	Robert	Earl of Warwick	He refused to sit in this house with Pride and Hewson, one of whom had been a drayman and the other a cobbler.
	8	Edward	earl of Manchester	
	9	Edmund	earl of Mulgrave	
	10	John (Note: Noble and Cobbett name him David (Noble 1787, p. 376; Cobbett 1808, p. 1581).)	earl of Cassilis	A Scottish earl and Lord Justice General of Scotland. One of three Scots.
	11	William	lord viscount Saye and Sele	
§	12	Thomas	lord Fauconberg	In 1657 he was a viscount, and married to Mary younger daughter of Oliver Cromwell.
§	13	Charles	lord visc. Howard.	in 1657 Cromwell bestowed upon him the title Baron Gilsland and Viscount Howard of Morpeth.
§	14	Philip	lord viscount Lisle	
§	15	Sir Gilbert Pickering	bart, chamberlain of our household	
§	16	George	lord Evres (or Eure)	He was the only peer created before the Interregnum to sit in the Other House.
§	17	Philip	lord Wharton	
§	18	Roger	lord Broghill	One of the Irish members, he was fifth son of Richard Boyle, 1st Earl of Cork.
	19	William Pierpoint,	esq.	
§	20	John lord Claypoole	master of our horse	Married to Elizabeth Claypole, Oliver Cromwell's second and favourite daughter.
§	21	Sir Bulstrode Whitlock	one of the lord commissioners of our Treasury	
§	22	John Disbrowe	one of the generals of our fleet	Married Eltisley Jane Cromwell, sister to the Lord Protector.
§	23	Edward Montagu	one of the generals of our fleet, and one of the lords commissioners of our Treasury	
	24	George Monk	commander in chief of our forces in Scotland	
§	25	John Glynn,	chief-justice assigned to hold pleas before us in the Upper Bench	One of four Welsh members
	26	William Lenthall,	master of the rolls in Chancery	
	27	Oliver St. John,	chief justice of our court of Common-Pleas	Married to Elizabeth Cromwell, a cousin of the Lord Protector
	28	William Steel,	chancellor of Ireland	
§	29	Sir Charles Wolseley,	bart.	
§	30	William Sydenham	one of the lords commissioners of our Treasury	
§	31	Philip Skippon,	esq.	
§	32	Walter Strickland,	esq.	
§	33	Francis Rouse,	esq.	
§	34	Philip Jones,	esq. comptroller of our household	One of four Welsh members.
§	35	John Fiennes,	esq.	Third son of the William, Lord Viscount Saye and Sele
§	36	Sir John Hobart,	bart.	
	37	Sir Gilbert Gerrard,	bart.	
	38	Sir Arthur Hasilrigge,	bart.	
§	39	Sir Francis Russell,	bart.	A near relation to the protector by the marriage of Russell's daughter Elizabeth to Henry Cromwell.
§	40	Sir William Strickland,	knt. and bart.	
§	41	Sir Richard Onslow,	knt.	
§	42	Edward Whalley,	commissary-general of the horse	
	43	Alexander Popham,	esq.	
	44	John Crewe,	esq.	Raised to a peerage by Charles II after the restoration of the monarchy.
	45	Sir William Lockhart,	knt.	Nephew by marriage to Oliver Cromwell. One of three Scots.
§	46	Richard Hampden,	esq.	Eldest son and heir of John Hampden
§	47	Sir Thomas Honywood,	knt.	Brother-in-law to Henry Vane the Younger.
	48	Sir Archibald Johnston,		Laird of Wareston. One of three Scots.
§	49	Richard Ingoldsby,	esq.	A near relation to the protector.
§	50	Sir Christopher Packe	knt.	
§	51	Sir Robert Tichborne, (Note: Noble names the man as Richard (Noble 1787, p. 416), but Cobbett names him Robert (Cobbett 1808, p. 1518).)	knt.	was an alderman of London
§	52	John Jones,	esq.	brother-in-law to the protector, and one of four Welsh members.
§	53	Sir Thomas Pride,	knt.	Famous for his leading part in Pride's Purge. He was foundling in a church porch. He was at first a drayman, and before the start of the Civil War he had established a brewery.
§	54	Sir John Barkstead,	lieutenant of our Tower of London	
§	55	Sir George Fleetwood,	knt.	
	56	Sir Matthew Tomlinson,	knt.	
§	57	Sir John Hewson,	knt.	A cobbler by trade before the Civil War.
§	58	Edmund Thomas,	esq.	One of four Welsh members.
§	59	James Berry,	esq.	
§	60	William Goffe,	esq.	
§	61	Thomas Cooper,	esq.	
	62 (Note: Besides the 61 Protectorate lords of the other house listed above, two more gentlemen were given as Protectorate lords by Thurloe, but if so Mark Noble surmises they must have been invited to join the house after the year 1657 (Noble 1787, p. 426).)	Sir William Roberts,	knt.	
	63	John Clarke,	esq.	

== See also ==
- Knights, baronets and peers of the Protectorate
