= Thomas Marshall (dean of Gloucester) =

English churchman and linguist

Thomas Marshall (baptised 9 January 1621 – 18 April 1685) was an English churchman and linguist, Rector of Lincoln College, Oxford and Dean of Gloucester.

== Life ==
The son of Thomas Marshall, he was born at Barkby in Leicestershire, and baptised there on 9 January 1621. He was educated first under Francis Foe, vicar of Barkby, matriculated at Oxford on 23 October 1640, as a batler of Lincoln College, and was Traps scholar from 31 July 1641 until 1648. Oxford was garrisoned for the king and Marshall served in the regiment of Henry Carey, 1st Earl of Dover, at his own expense, so that he was excused fees when graduating B.A. on 9 July 1645. On the approach of a parliamentary visitation in 1647, Marshall left the university and went abroad. On 14 July 1648 he was expelled for absence by the visitors. In Rotterdam he became preacher to the company of merchant adventurers in that city at the end of 1650. In 1656, when the merchants moved to Dort, he accompanied them and remained there for sixteen years. On 1 July 1661 he graduated B.D. at Oxford.

Marshall was a student of Anglo-Saxon and Gothic. His Observations on Anglo-Saxon and Gothic versions of the gospel, which he published in 1665, led to his unsolicited election to a fellowship of Lincoln College on 17 December 1668. He proceeded D.D. on 28 June of the following year, and was chosen Rector of his college on 19 October 1672. Soon after he was made chaplain in ordinary to the king. He was rector of Bladon, near Woodstock, from May 1680 to February 1682, and was installed dean of Gloucester on 30 April 1681 In 1681 and 1684 he was one of the delegates for the chancellor of the university, James Butler, 1st Duke of Ormonde, who was absent in Ireland.

Marshall died suddenly in Lincoln College, about 11 P.M., on Easter Eve, 18 April 1685, and was buried in the chancel of All Saints' Church, Oxford. A memorial stone in the floor, with a Latin inscription, marks the spot. He left the residue of his estate to Lincoln College, for the maintenance of poor scholars. 'Marshall's scholars ' were regularly elected from 1688 to 1765, when the scholarships ceased to be distinctively designated. He bequeathed many books and manuscripts to the public library of the university, which are still kept together. The manuscripts include several of his own grammars and lexicons of Coptic, Arabic, Gothic, and Saxon. His Socinian books were left to John Kettlewell whom he made his executor. Lincoln College library hold a collection of Civil War pamphlets, bound into 76 volumes, which Marshall specified were to be held in their library.

== Works ==
His reputation rests on his philological learning, especially in early Teutonic languages. Franciscus Junius, his former teacher, moved to Oxford in 1676, and lived opposite Lincoln College, in order to be near him.

Besides his Observationes in Evangeliorum Versiones perantiquas duas, Gothicas scil. et Anglo-Saxonicas (Dort, 1665; Amsterdam, 1684), he published anonymously The Catechism set forth in the Book of Common Prayer, Oxford, 1679, 1680, 1700. To the later editions was added An Essay of Questions and Answers, also by Marshall. It was translated into Welsh by John Williams of Jesus College, Cambridge, and published at Oxford in 1682. He edited Josephus Abudacnus's Historia Jacubitarum seu Coptorum, in Egypto, Oxford, 1675, and wrote a prefatory epistle to Thomas Hyde's translation of the Gospels and Acts into Malay, Oxford, 1677. He also assisted in the compilation of Richard Parr's Life of Archbishop Ussher (published the year after Marshall's death).

A different Thomas Marshall published three sermons under the title of The King's Censure upon Recusants,

Academic offices
Preceded by Nathaniel Crewe	Rector of Lincoln College, Oxford; 1672–1685	Succeeded by Fitzherbert Adams
