= Charter Tower =

Building in England

Coordinates: 51°45′30″N 0°28′23″W

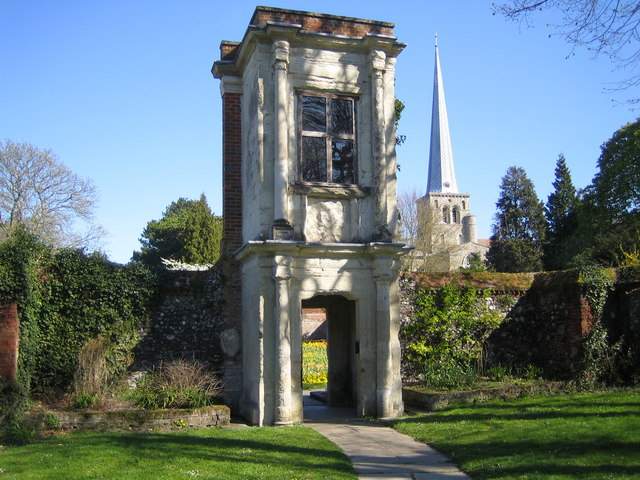
The Charter Tower

The Charter Tower is a Grade II* listed building in Gadebridge Park, Hemel Hempstead, Hertfordshire, England. The two-storey tower, built of ashlar, is the entranceway and all that remains of the former manor house of Sir Richard Combe, and his arms may still be seen on the tower.
