= Joseph Gulston (chaplain) =

Joseph Gulston (Note: Often recorded in historical clerical registers as Josephus Gulston or Joseph Gulson.)(1603 - 1669) was chaplain and almoner to Charles I of England. He was also precentor and Dean of Chichester cathedral.

== Education ==
Gulson who matriculated as a pensioner from Trinity College, Cambridge in 1619; graduated with a B.A. in 1622/ 23. He then served as college fellow in 1624, and was awarded M.A. 1626, B.D. (Lit. Reg) and D.D. at Oxford in 1643.

== Career ==
Gulston was rector of Ham (Wiltshire) in 1634, rector of Fonthill Bishop (Wiltshire) in 1639, rector of Bishop's Waltham (Hampshire) in 1643, and rector of Felpham (Sussex) in 1668. Gulston held a prebendary of Winchester from 1660 to 1669 and served as Precentor and Dean of Chichester from 1663 to 1669. At the time the joint appointment of Precentor and Dean was not unusual. In 1684 Charles II of England had tried to make the joint appointment permanent. It lasted after Gulstons death, but was rescinded in 1688.

He was also almoner and chaplain to Charles I, a post he held until the kings execution. It seems that the family paid a price for this as the bulk of the land that they owned was sequested.

== Family ==
Joseph Gulston was married to Anna and had five sons and six daughters with her. He died in 1669 and is buried in Chichester Cathedral.

== Sources ==
- CCED (2026). "Clergy of the Church of England database". Kings Digital Lab.
- Holtby, Robert (1994). "The Medieval Fabric". In Mary Hobbs (ed.). Chichester Cathedral: An Historic Survey. Chichester: Phillimore. ISBN 0-85033-924-3.
- Smith, Henry Ecroyd (1878). Annals of Smith of Cantley, Balby, and Doncaster. Printed for subscribers. OCLC 12658332.
- Venn (2026). "Joseph Gulston". Cambridge University.

Church of England titles
Preceded by Joseph Henshaw	Dean of Chichester; 1663 –1669	Succeeded by Nathaniel Crew
