= Norwich baronets =

Extinct baronetcy in the Baronetage of England

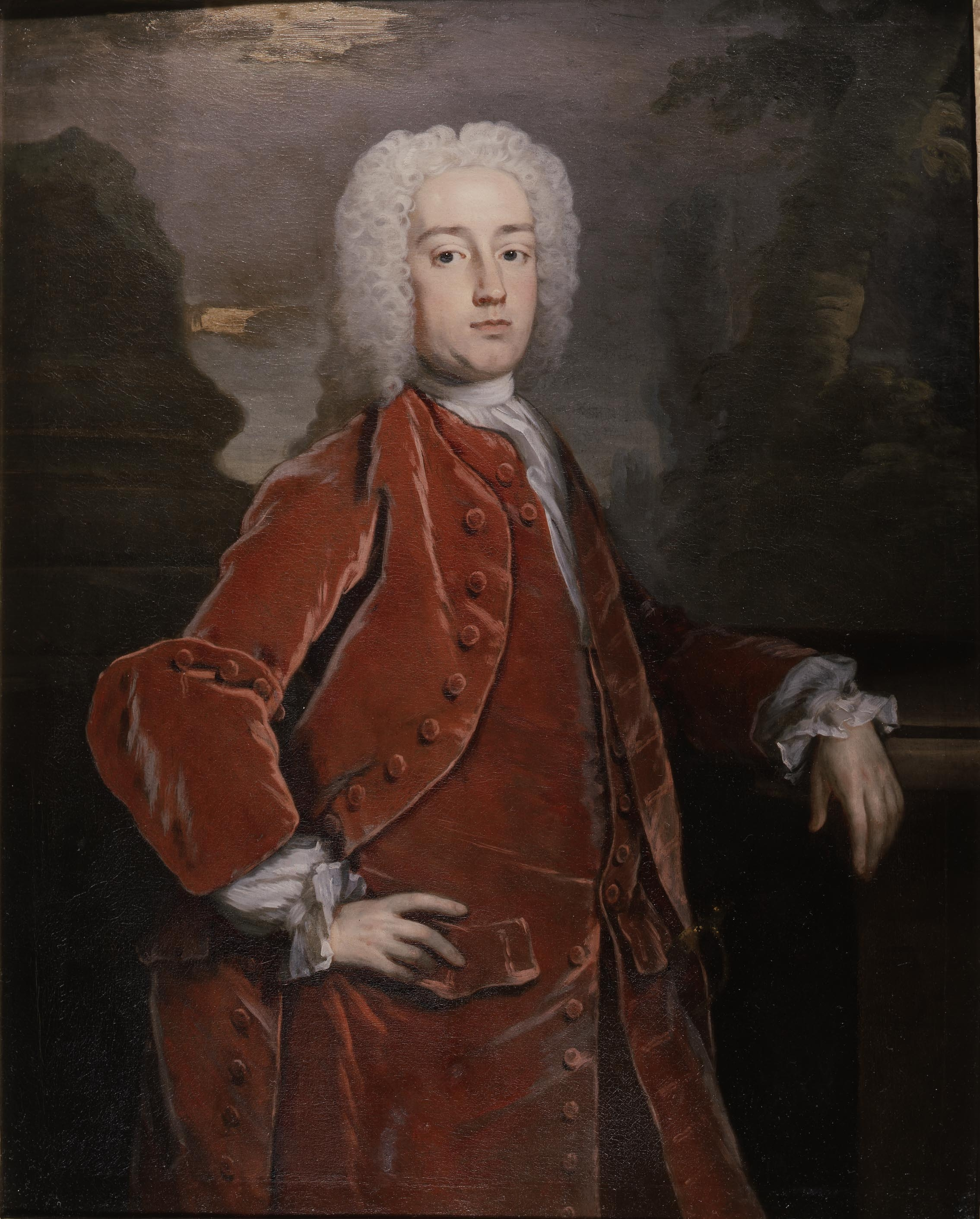
Sir William Norwich, 4th Baronet

The Norwich Baronetcy, of Brampton in the County of Northampton, was a title in the Baronetage of England. It was created on 24 July 1641 for John Norwich, Member of Parliament for Northamptonshire and Northampton. The second Baronet was member of parliament for Northampton. The title is presumed to have become extinct on the death of the fourth Baronet in 1742.

The Norwichs had acquired the manor of Brampton on marrying Margaret, heiress of Holt-Hetol Gifford.

== Norwich baronets, of Brampton (1641) ==
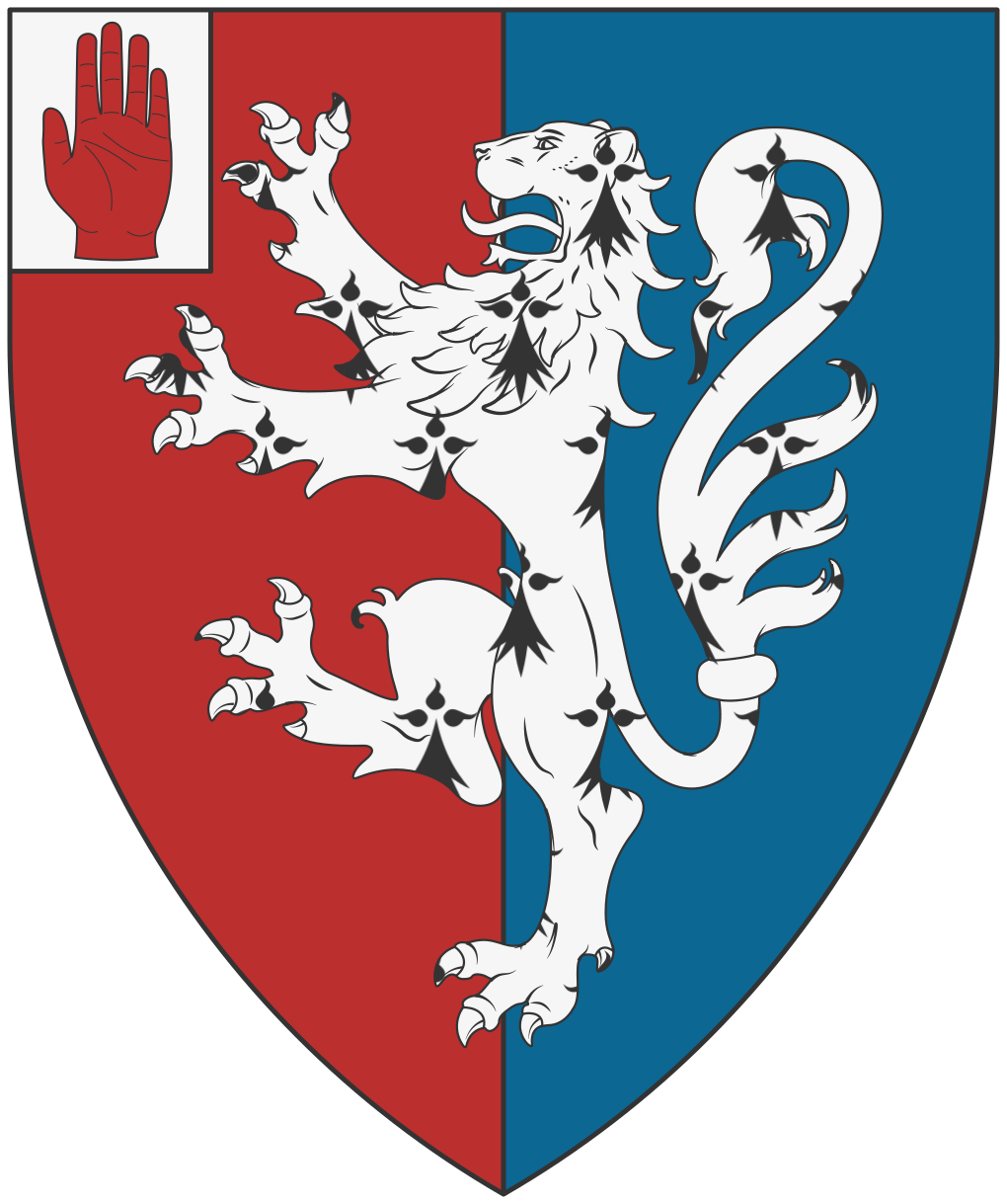
The coat of arms of Norwich of Brampton, Baronets.

- Sir John Norwich, 1st Baronet (1613–1661)
- Sir Roger Norwich, 2nd Baronet (1636–1691)
- Sir Erasmus Norwich, 3rd Baronet (1668–1720)
- Sir William Norwich, 4th Baronet (1711–1742)
