= Gadebridge Park =

Park in Hemel Hempstead, England

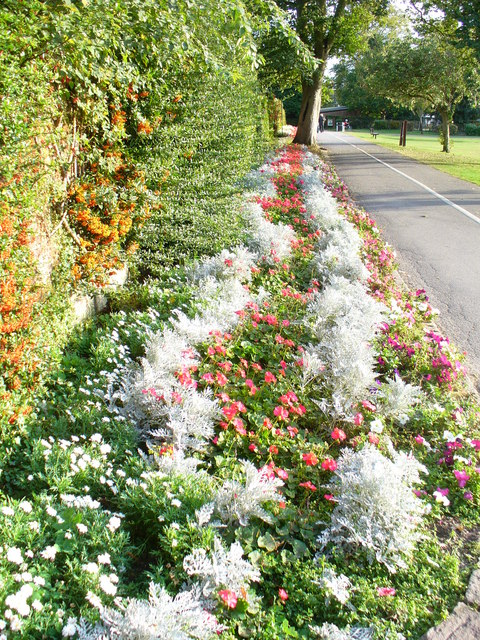
- Interactive map of Gadebridge Park
- Type: Park
- Location: Hemel Hempstead, Hertfordshire, England
- Coordinates: 51.762°N 0.478°W
- Area: 32 hectares (79 acres)
- Open: All year
- Website: Official website

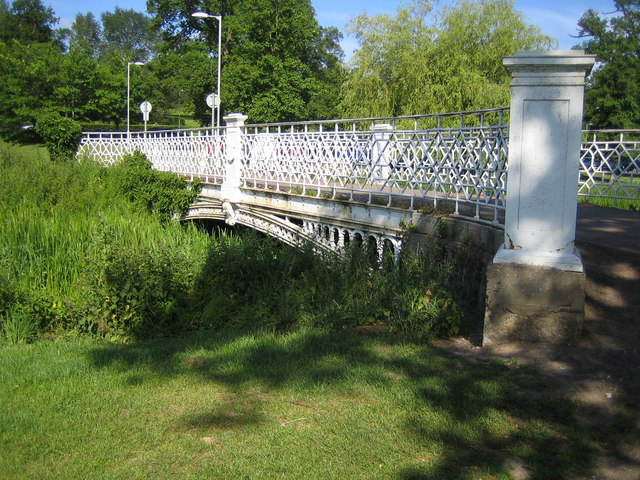
The listed bridge

Gadebridge Park is an urban park in Hemel Hempstead, Hertfordshire, England.

== History ==
The first reference to a building on the land is in 1289 when there was a house called Burymilne. Before 1539 the land was the home of the Waterhouse family. Sir Richard Combe inherited the land and built another house which remained in place until 1790.

One big children's play area, a skate park, cycling and walking paths, and an outdoor gym. The area covered is around 32 hectares. Gadebridge parkrun, a free weekly timed 5k event takes place in the park each Saturday morning at 9 am.

== Landmarks ==
The park contains a Roman villa which is a listed ancient monument. There is a bridge over the River Gade which is Grade II listed with Historic England. The Charter Tower is a Grade II* listed building.
