= Sir John Norwich, 1st Baronet =

Sir John Norwich, 1st Baronet (19 September 1613 – 9 October 1661) was an English politician who sat in the House of Commons at times between 1654 and 1660.

Norwich was created baronet of Brampton in the county of Northampton on 24 July 1641. In 1654, he was elected Member of Parliament for Northamptonshire in the First Protectorate Parliament.

In 1660, Norwich was elected MP for Northampton in the Convention Parliament.

Norwich died at the age of 48

Norwich married firstly Anne Smith, daughter of Sir Roger Smith of Edmondthorp, Leicestershire. He married secondly Mary Atkins, daughter of Sir Henry Atkins of Cheshunt, He was succeeded in the baronetcy by his son by his first wife Roger.

Parliament of England
Preceded by Sir Gilbert Pickering, 1st Baronet; Thomas Brooke	Member of Parliament for Northamptonshire; 1654; With: Sir Gilbert Pickering, 1st Baronet; Thomas Brooke; John Crew; John Claypole, senior Sir John Dryden, 2nd Baronet	Succeeded by Sir Gilbert Pickering, 1st Baronet; John, Lord Claypole; William Boteler; Thomas Crew; Alexander Blake; John Langham
Baronetage of England
New creation	Baronet (of Brampton); 1641–1661	Succeeded by Roger Norwich
