= Sir Griffith Williams, 1st Baronet =

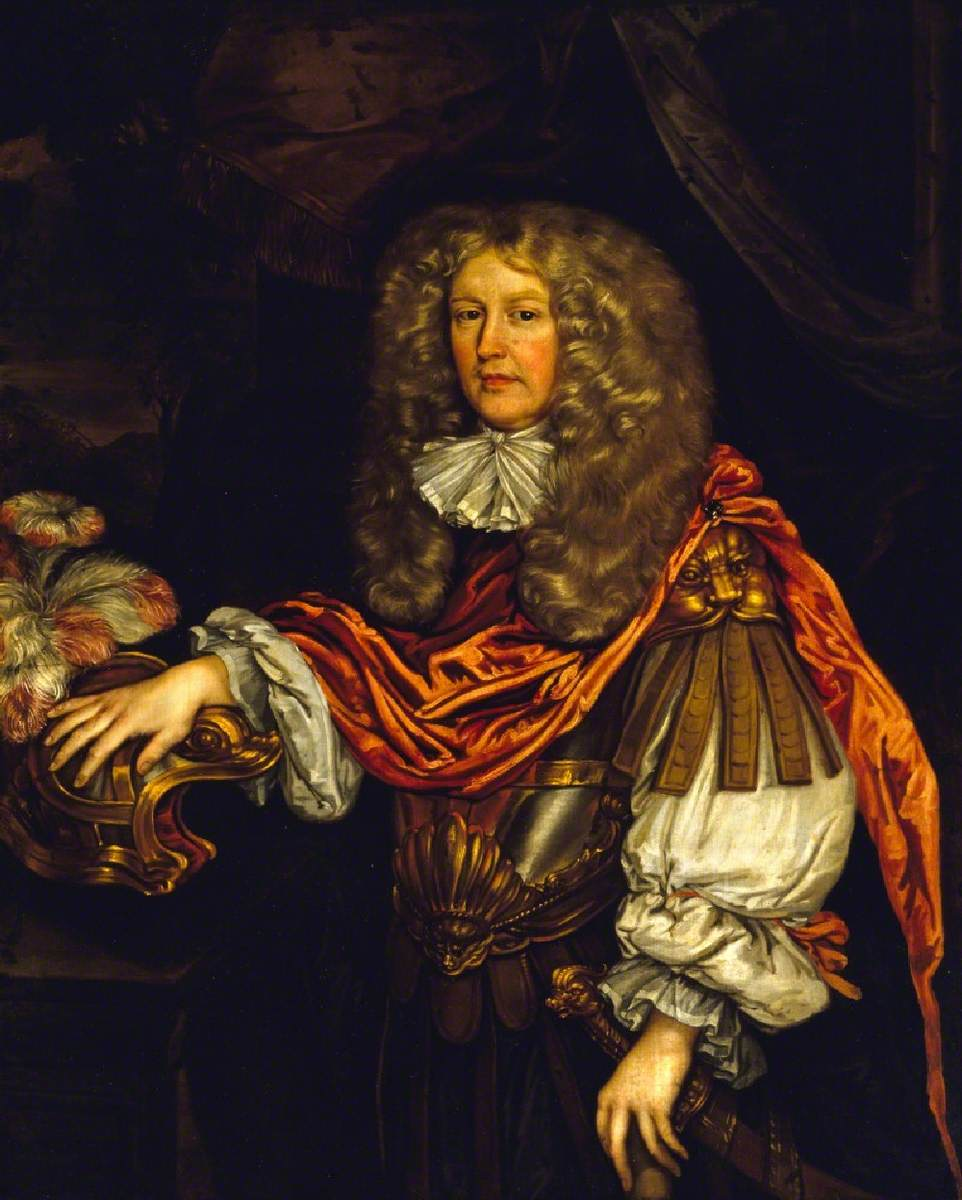

Sir Griffith Williams, 1st Baronet (died 1663) of Penrhyn, Carnarvonshire, was Sheriff of Carnarvonshire in 1650–1651, and held the unusual distinction of being granted a baronetcy by both the Lord Protector Oliver Cromwell and King Charles II.

== Biography ==
Griffith Williams was the only son and heir of Robert Williams (died before February 1624), of Penryallt, near Conway, by Elizabeth (died 26 April 1608, buried at Conway), daughter of Griffith John Griffith, of Cefnamwich. (Note: Robert, was elder brother of the well known John Williams, sometime (1621–1625] when Bishop of Lincoln, Lord Keeper of the Great Seal, and afterwards (1641–1650) Archbishop of York) He was admitted to Lincoln's Inn on 21 February 1624.

Williams was Sheriff of Carnarvonshire in 1650–1651 and a Commissioner of Assessment there in 1656. He was created a Baronet by the Lord Protector Oliver Cromwell on 28 May 1658, a dignity, which was disallowed after the Restoration in May 1660, though about a year later he was (presumably on account of the loyal services of his late uncle. Archbishop John Williams), created a baronet, on 17 June 1661, by the King Charles II. He died towards the end of 1663. His son and heir was Sir Robert Williams.

== Family ==
Williams married, in or before 1627, Gwen (died in 1676), daughter of Hugh Bodwrda, of Bodwrda, Carnarvonshire. They had nineteen children.

== Notes ==
Baronetage of England
New creation	Baronet (of Penrhyn); 1661–1663	Succeeded by Robert Williams
