= Sir Richard Combe =

Knight (c. 1632–living 1675)

Sir Richard Combe (c. 1632 – living 1675) of Hemel Hempstead, was knighted by the Lord Protector Oliver Cromwell during the Interregnum and again shortly after the Restoration by Charles II. (Note: Also known as Richard Combes.)

== Biography ==
Richard Combe was the son of Tobias Combe, of Felmeston-Bury, Hertfordshire, and Mary, daughter of John Theede of Crofton Com. Buckinghamshire.

Combe was knighted by the Lord Protector Oliver Cromwell at Whitehall in August 1656. This honour passed into oblivion with the Restoration of the monarchy under Charles II in May 1660, however Charles bestowed a new knighthood on Sir Richard on 5 February 1661. (Note: Some sources give the date as 5 February 1660, however that is using the old style dates with the new year starting on 25 March (see Old Style and New Style dates).) During the Interregnum Sir Richard a supporter of the Parliamentary cause prospered, (Note: This increase in prosperity was largely caused by the close connexion which existed during the Civil War and the Protectorate between Hertfordshire and Parliament. Sir Richard Combe, a Parliamentarian, purchased a moiety of the manor of Hemelhempstead in 1655 and lived at the Bury, helping the town in many ways (Gladstone 1929, p. 212).) but after the Restoration his fortunes waned, and he died poor.

The manor house of Sir Richard Combe was located in the Gadebridge Park, of which currently only the Charter Tower remains. His arms may still be seen on the tower.

== Family ==
Combe married twice. His first wife was named Anne, daughter and coheir of John Frere of Stroke Suffolk. (Note: The records of the two wives presented in this biography are from Le Neve & Marshall 1873, p. 127, but a more recent source states that the "[On the] buried coffin-lids ... a coat of arms was plainly visible ..., and one of them bore the following inscription 'Here lyeth buried the boddy of Dame Ann Combe, the dutiful and respectful daughter of her father, late of Ashenham, in the county of Essex, Esquire, and beloved wife of Richard Combe, Hemel Hempstead, in the county of Hertford, Knight, April 17th, 1658.'" (White 1901, p. 189)) They had two sons:

- Richard (1654–1692).
- Thomas (born 1656 – before 1692).

Combe married secondly Anne daughter of —— Trowe of ——, Oxfordshire.

== Ancestry ==
Ancestors of Sir Richard Combe

8. Richard Combe of Hemel Hempstead Hertfordshire
4. Francis Combe of Hemsted
9. Elizabeth daughter of William Marshall of Edlesborough Buckinghamshire
2. Tobias Combe of Felmeston-Bury, Hertfordshire
10. John Pope (died 1583) of Wroxton Oxfordshire
5. Jane daughter of John Pope (died 1583) of Wroxton Oxfordshire (sister of the Earl of Downe)
11. Elizabeth, daughter of Sir John Brocket (died 1558) of Brocket Hall, Hertfordshire
1. Sir Richard Combe
12.
6. John Theede, of Crofton Com. Buckinghamshire
13.
3. Mary daughter of John Theede, of Crofton Com. Buckinghamshire
14.
7.
15.
