= Thomas Crewe =

English politician and lawyer (1565–1634)

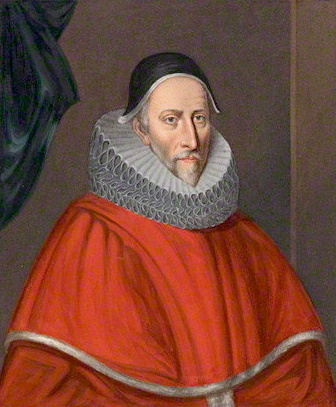
Sir Thomas Crewe.

Sir Thomas Crewe (or Crew) (1565 – 31 January 1634), of Stene, between Farthinghoe and Brackley in Northamptonshire, was an English Member of Parliament and lawyer, and served as Speaker of the House of Commons from 1623 to 1625.

He was a son of John Crewe and Alicia, a daughter Humphrey Manwaring of Nantwich.

Crewe was a member of Gray's Inn, and a serjeant-at-law. He went to Woodstock Palace in September 1603, where the royal family had gone to avoid plague in London, and sent a letter of news and business to Mary Talbot, Countess of Shrewsbury. The business concerned the marriage of her daughter Mary to the Earl of Pembroke.

He entered Parliament in 1604 as Member for Lichfield, and was later MP for Northampton (1621–2), Aylesbury (1623–1625) and Gatton (1625). In 1621 he drew attention to himself by defying the King, declaring the liberties of Parliament to be "matters of inheritance". In 1623 he was knighted, and in the Parliament summoned that year (which first assembled in February 1624) he was elected Speaker; he served in that capacity in the two Parliaments known to history as the Happy Parliament and the Useless Parliament. In 1633, he was appointed a member of the ecclesiastical commission. He died the following year.

Sir Thomas Crew married Temperance Bray, daughter of Reginald Bray and Hon. Anne Vaux, daughter of Thomas Vaux, 2nd Baron Vaux. Some of their children include:

- John, followed him into Parliament, and was raised to the peerage as Baron Crew in 1661 for his role in bringing about the Restoration.
- Patience, married to Sir John Curzon, 1st Baronet and had issue.

He lived at Stene, Northamptonshire, and died on 31 January 1633.

Political offices
Preceded by Sir Thomas Richardson	Speaker of the House of Commons; 1623-1625	Succeeded by Sir Heneage Finch
