= John Claypole =

English politician (1625–1688)

Lord John Claypole
- Born: 21 August 1625
- Died: 26 June 1688 (aged 62)
- Spouse: Elizabeth Cromwell
- Children: 3
- Military career
- Allegiance: Parliamentarians
- Branch: Army
- Rank: Master of the Horse
- Conflicts: English Civil War

John Claypole (21 August 1625 – 26 June 1688) was an English politician and militant who served as an officer in the Parliamentary army in 1645 during the English Civil War. He was appointed as Lord Claypole by Oliver Cromwell, however this title was not legally recognised until after the Restoration of 1660.

A Member of Parliament in 1654 and 1656, he was a well-known acquaintance of Cromwell, marrying his second daughter Elizabeth sometime before October 1646. He raised a troop of horse for Parliament to oppose Charles II in 1651 and was master of the horse to his father-in-law the Lord Protector. After the restoration of the monarchy he lived a more modest and quiet social life, but may have been briefly imprisoned as a suspect in a plot in 1678, only to be released when no evidence of his involvement was presented.

== Background ==
Claypole descended from a gentle family (Note: The family of Claypole is certainly ancient, taking their name from the manor so called in Lincolnshire. Two clergymen, Hugo, and John, are mentioned by Newcourt, as rectors of St Mary Mounthaw and St Nicholas Acon (in the Diocese of London) at the latter end of fourteenth century; and (in John Claypole, of North-Barrow, knt. was a benefactor of St Catherine's-Hall, in Cambridge, as we are informed by the history of that university. Mr Edmondson has given to the Claypoles these arms, viz. ermine an anulet in the centre, on a chief or two bends azure (Noble 1784, p. 349).) in Narborough, in the county of Northampton (now known as Northborough, Cambridgeshire), (Note: By 1784 the manor of Northborough belonged to the Earl Fitzwilliam (Noble 1784, p. 349).) upon the borders of Lincolnshire, possessing considerable estates in both those counties.

Claypole was the son of John Claypole the Elder and his wife Mary/Marie Claypole (née Angell), and the grandson of Adam Claypole. In 1637 John Claypole Sr. was summoned before the Star Chamber, and the attorney-general was ordered to commence a prosecution against him for refusing to pay ship money; it cannot therefore be wondered at, that he declared for the Parliament at the start of the English Civil War in 1643, and 1644, he was appointed one "of their assessors for the county of Northampton; but at this time he was so little known,' that his name is spelt a great variety of ways, (Note: Mr. Claypole is called Chappole, Clappoole, Claipol, and Claypole; it is singular, that the Cromwells, who so well must know how the name should be spelt, write it variously. He is called only gentleman in the summons from the Star Chamber" .Noble 1784, p. 350)

John Claypole Sr. was presumably sheriff of his own county, as major-general William Boteler wrote in a recommendation letter to John Thurloe dated to 16 November, he was a member of Parliament in 1654 for the county of Northamptonshire and was alive so late as 1657, when he was made a commissioner with his son for levying the taxes upon the county of Northampton. To distinguish father and son, the elder is known as "John Claypole Esq. Sr." while the younger is known as "Lord Claypole".

Mark Noble speculates that the sentiments the father entertained respecting the state of the nation was probably the same as that which Oliver Cromwell possessed, when he first gained a seat in the Long Parliament; and as John Claypole had suffered hardships during King Charles I's Eleven Years' Tyranny, it might occasion an intimacy that ended in an alliance between the families.

== Civil War and Protectorate ==
John Claypole jnr first appeared in arms for parliamentary cause in the First English Civil War at the siege of Newark in the winter of 1645–46. On 11 August 1651, during the Third Civil War, he received a commission from the council of State to raise a troop of horse in the counties of Northamptonshire and Lincolnshire to oppose the march of Charles II into England.

Copy of a medal engraving of Claypole by Thomas Simon

When his father-in-law, Oliver Cromwell, was invested with the title of Protector, he received from him the office of master of the horse; and, as such, led the horse of state at the inauguration, going bare-headed on one side of the protector's body coach, with Walter Strickland, captain of the guard to the Lord Protector, he acted in the same capacity at the second, or more magnificent investment, when he stood immediately behind the protector during that ceremony.

He was a member of First Protectorate Parliament, in 1654, for Carmarthenshire. On 15 January 1656 he was appointed a member of the committee of trade. He was elected MP for Northamptonshire and for Carmarthenshire in the Second Protectorate Parliament in 1656 and chose to sit for Northamptonshire. (Note: Major-General Whalley says in a letter, dated 9 August 1656, that if his cousin Claypole could offer himself for Lincoln, and acquaint him with it in time, he thought he could procure his return. (Noble 1784, p. 352 citing Thurloe's State papers).) in parliament, he opposed the power of the major-generals. Ludlow said:

Mr. Cleypoole stood up in the house, which was unusual for him to do, and told the house, he could but start the game, and must leave it to them that had more experience to follow the chase, and therefore should only say, that he had formerly thought it necessary, in respect of the condition in which the nation had been, that the major-generals should be entrusted with the authority which they had exercised but in the present state of affairs, he conceived it inconsistent with the laws of England, and liberties of the people, to continue their power any longer. This speech [continues Ludlow] was a clear direction to the sycophants of the court, who being clear that Claypole had delivered the sense, if not the very words of Cromwell in this matter, joined as one man in opposing the major-generals, and so their authority was abrogated.

Claypole was appointed by his father-in-law one of the lords of his bed-chamber, clerk of the hanaper, and ranger of Whittlewood Forest in Northamptonshire, where he built Wakefield Lodge, a magnificent house near Potterspury. (It came into the possession the Dukes of Grafton, the first duke having had a grant of the forest in 1685, with the title of hereditary ranger.) To raise him still further above the rank of a private gentleman, Cromwell granted Claypole a baronet on 16 July 1657, and arranged to have him knighted at Whitehall the same day. Later that year Claypole was made one of the Protectors lords, and given a seat in the Protector's Upper House.

Oliver Cromwell directed Claypole to receive the Dutch ambassadors upon their return to London, in March 1654; and he used Claypole as his to go-between when asking for advice from William Lilly the astrologer. During the short reign of his brother-in-law Richard Cromwell, Claypole retained all his places at court, and carried the sword of state when Richard opened his Parliament.

In his religious sentiments Claypole was a Presbyterian, and in that communion died; however, he was not puritanical in his demeanour. Mrs. Hutchinson terms him "a debauched ungodly cavalier", (Note: Firth paraphrases Hutchinson. What she actually said was he was one of a pair: "[Cromwell's] son Henry and son-in-law Claypole, were two debauched, ungodly Cavaliers" (George Augustus Sala, Edmund Hodgson Yates. Temple Bar, Volume 115, Ward and Lock, 1898. Page 206)) and in the Second Narrative of the late Parliament he is described as one "whose qualifications not answering to those honest principles formerly so pretended of putting none but godly men into places of trust, was for a long time kept out". Samuel Pepys mentions a famous running footman who had been in Claypole's service, and Clapole also asked Colonel Verney for a dog of superior fighting capacity. Claypole had a taste for mathematics, and probably for architecture, and was the intimate friend of Christopher Wren. (Note: Christopher Wren, when dining with John Claypole, was surprised by the protector Oliver Cromwell coming into the room, and (without the least notice being taken) sitting down and eating with them; during the repast, turning to Wren, he said, "you have a relation who has long been in the Tower, he may have his liberty if he chooses it". "Will your highness give me leave to acquaint him with what you say?"—"Yes." Wren went with joy to the old Bishop of Ely, Matthew Wren; but his answer was, "This is not the first intimation of the same kind, but I scorn to receive my liberty from a tyrant and usurper;" and so he remained a prisoner until the restoration let him free.(Noble 1784, p. 357))

== During the restoration ==
Mark Noble suggests that Claypole had a mild and gentle disposition that rendered him unfit for any services for the Protectors, but such as were of a peaceable kind, and which they were lavish in giving to him, both as the husband of Oliver's favourite child, and as a most amiable person Oliver employed. Instead therefore, of appointing Claypole to be a major-general, where severity and rigour was necessary, Oliver gave him places of great honour and emolument, but of such a nature as that the most scrupulous might accept. As Claypole had never, during the whole time of his relations holding the helm, done any action that could even inconvenience an individual, at the restoration of the monarchy he was included in the general pardon, unlike those who had participated in acts such as the regicide of Charles I who were exempted from the general pardon and were tried for crimes committed during the Interregnum. Until her death in 1665 Claypole gave shelter to Elizabeth Cromwell, his mother-in-law and Oliver Cromwell's widow. (Note: Mark Noble speculates that although the register says that Elizabeth Cromwell, the widow of Oliver, was buried in Northbrough, on 19 November 1665 this was only a political death, because she feared persecution and thought it prudent to be supposed dead. Noble based this speculation on information provided by the Reverend James Clearke of Peterbrought (Noble 1784, p. viii).) Some years afterwards, however, when court and country were filled with rumours of plots, Claypole was fixed upon to be the head and contriver of one against the royal family, supposedly in consort with the old Oliverian party.

Mark Noble states that he was apprehended, in June 1678, and sent to the Tower, obtaining an habeas corpus to the king's bench, he thought to procure bail but though many persons, to whom no objection could be made, offered themselves for that purpose, chief-justice Sir William Scroggs set the bail so high that Claypole's friends thought it prudent to decline it. Claypole was therefore remanded back to the Tower; but at the next term, as no evidence appeared against him, and what was, perhaps, much more fortunate to him, a counter plot began to work, he was discharged. When writing the Dictionary of National Biography article on Claypole, Charles Harding Firth concurs with Noble, but Ivan Roots in the more recent Oxford Dictionary of National Biography does not, and thinks it is a case of mistaken identity because although a man called John Claypole, whose profession is given as a printer, was held on suspension of being involved in a plot given his character, it was unlikely to be John Claypole who resided at the manor of Northborough.

History is silent what became of him after his imprisonment. Probably he returned to his estate in Northamptonshire (where he had resided when he was taken into custody).

== Family ==
Elizabeth and John Claypole had a daughter and two sons Henry and Oliver. Oliver died just before his mother, and Mark Noble speculates that the grief for the loss may well have hastened her death in 1658. (Note: "A letter from Claypole to Henry Cromwell, expressing his feelings on the loss of his wife and his father-in-law, is printed in the 'Thurloe State Papers' (vii. 489)" (Firth 1887, p. 11)) His children with Elizabeth all predeceased him. Claypole married a second time, in June 1670, Blanche, widow of Lancelot Stavely, by whom he had one daughter, Bridget. However, Claypole fell under the influence of Anne Ottee, a laundress, and disinherited Bridget for Ottee's benefit. Bridget brought an action in chancery and recovered some portion of his property, but most of it, including the manor of Northborough, Claypole had sold off during his lifetime.

Claypole had several other relations including a brother called Henry In Thurloe's state papers, notice is taken of captain Wingfield Claypole, an officer in Ireland, and Christopher Claypole, who Mark Noble believed was also, in the army, and was sent to the Hague in 1658. John Claypole expresses his obligations to Henry Cromwell, lord-deputy (in a letter dated 16 April 1658) for his regard to his brothers and sisters, and himself, upon all occasions; he tells him, "that indeed, they cannot plead any desert, though," says he, "my sister is very good, yet not enough so to entitle her to so much of your kindness". This sister seems to be the wife of major Staples, who certainly married one of his sisters, and as he earnestly requests a place for him of the lord-deputy, it is most reasonable to suppose he was the husband of this sister in whose praise he speaks. Wingfield, and another of his brothers, had done something wrong, for he says of the former, "I wish he had not presumed upon your goodness, in to long an absence", and requests his pardon on his behalf, yet desires he may be reprehended; and also requests that his other brother may likewise be reproved, as he fears he will stand in too much need of it. Another brother was James Claypoole, 1634–1687, an admired friend of William Penn, the Quaker, who emigrated to Philadelphia, Pennsylvania in 1683. Other brothers included Edward (1636 – c. 1690), a Captain of Foot, who resided in Barbados from the late 1660s/early1670s and Norton (1640–1688), who emigrated to North America in 1678 and died there in Sussex County, Delaware.
