= Third Protectorate Parliament =

17th-century English parliament

← 1656	December 1658 – January 1659	1660 →

All 567 seats of the House of Commons 284 seats were needed for a majority
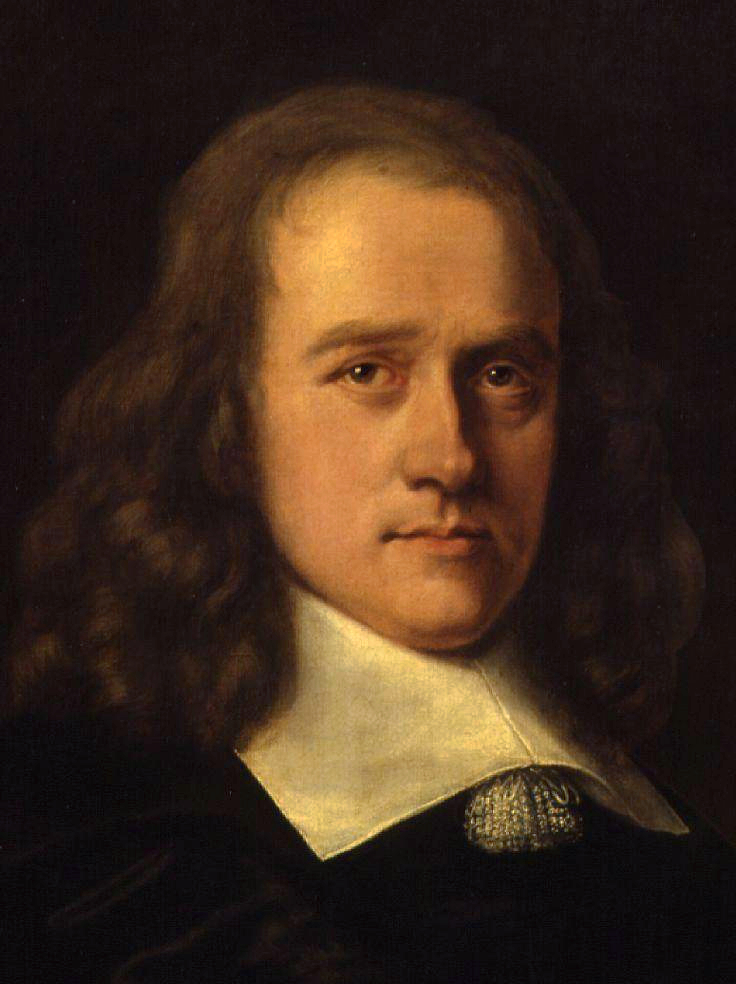

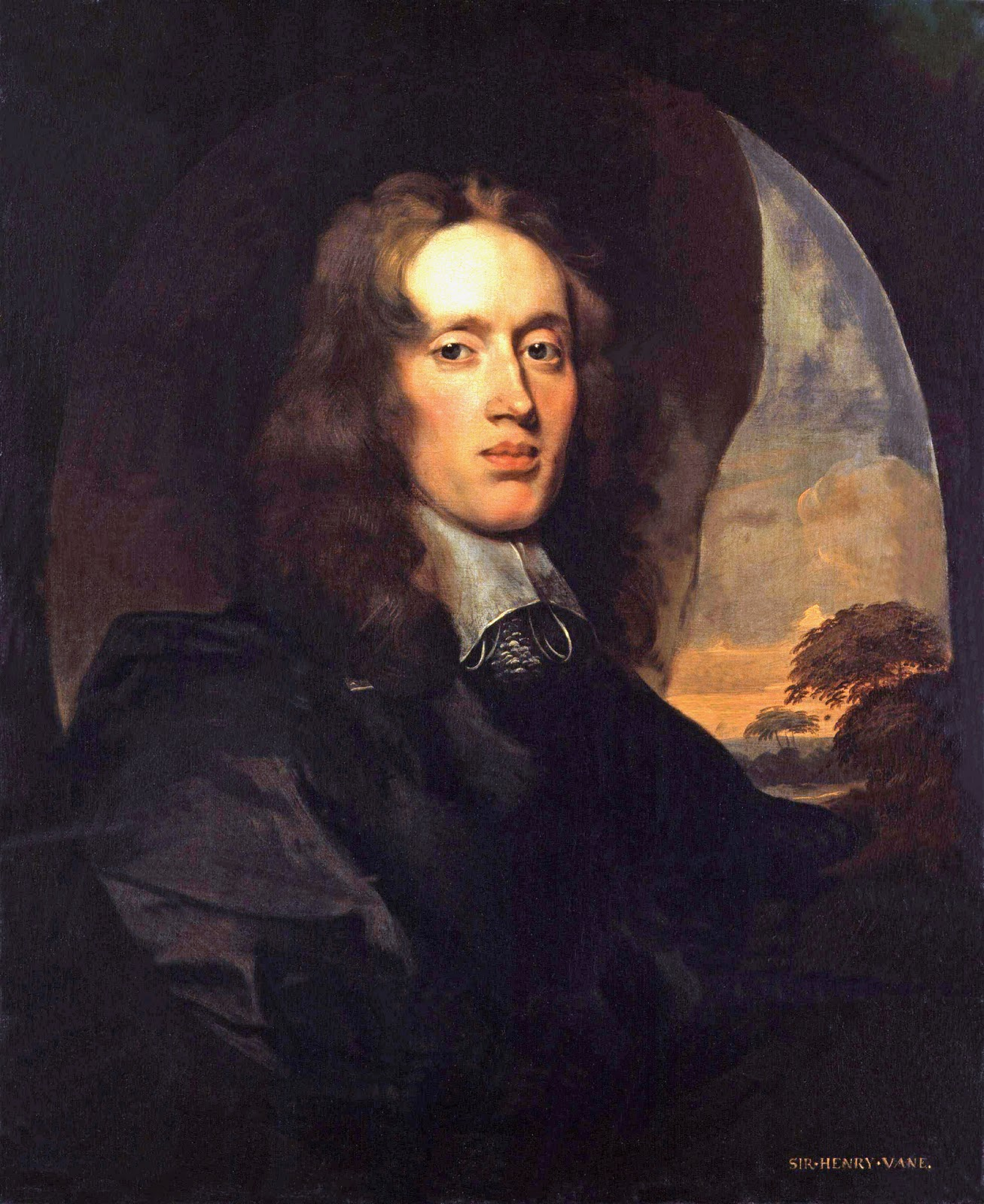
	First party	Second party
Leader	John Thurloe	Harry Vane
Party	Protectorate Faction	Commonwealthsmen
Leader's seat	Cambridge University	Whitchurch
Popular vote	-	-
Percentage	-	-

The Third Protectorate Parliament sat for one session, from 27 January 1659 until 22 April 1659, with Chaloner Chute and Thomas Bampfylde as the Speakers of the House of Commons. It was a bicameral Parliament, with an Upper House having a power of veto over the Commons.

== Events ==
After the death of Oliver Cromwell his son Richard Cromwell succeeded him as Lord Protector of the Protectorate on 3 September 1658. As a civilian, Richard did not have the full confidence of the Army, particularly as the administration had a perennial budget deficit of half a million pounds and the Army was owed nearly nine hundred thousand pounds in back pay. His only option was to call a Parliament in the hope that it would cement his position by general recognition of the ruling class and by raising new taxes to pay the arrears owed to the Army.

The Third Protectorate Parliament was summoned on 9 December 1658 on the basis of the old franchise, and assembled on 27 January 1659. Richard was recognised as Lord Protector by the Parliament by 223 votes to 134, but over the next month the old divisions re-surfaced. The "Commonwealthsmen" and members of the Rump Parliament (such as Sir Henry Vane, Edmund Ludlow and Sir Arthur Haselrig) wanted to dismantle the Protectorate and return to the Commonwealth which had existed between the regicide of Charles I in January 1649 and the dismissal of the Rump Parliament by Oliver Cromwell in 1653.

The Protectorate faction was led by the Secretary of State John Thurloe, General John Lambert and Major-Generals Charles Fleetwood and Sir John Desborough. These members wished to keep the Protectorate but were divided over who should command the Army and be Lord Protector.

"The proposition of restoring the Parliament met with great opposition from many of those that had tasted the sweetness of power and profit under the late usurpation of the Cromewells, and who feared a more equal distribution of things; and therefore they everywhere affirmed that there was not a sufficient number of members left to make up a Parliament".

An informal committee of key generals and republican parliamentary members met at Henry Vane the Younger's home at Charing-Cross; representing the army were John Lambert, Col John Hones, Col. Kelsey, Col. Berry, and representing Parliament were Sir Henry Vane, Sir Arthur Haslerig, Major Saloway and Edmund Ludlow.

"The things demanded by those of the army were: 1. To be secured by an act of indemnity for what was past; 2. That some provision of power might be made for Mr. Richard Cromwell, as well as for the payment of his debts, and future subsistence in a plentiful manner, they having promised to take care of him in these particulars; 3. That what should stand in need of regulation both in the law and clergy, should be reformed and amended; 4. That the government of the nation should be by a representative of the people, and by a select senate (chosen in part by the military faction)". Difficulties arose from mistrust between Parliament and the army, making effective working between the two houses problematic.

The issues came to a head when Parliament attempted to impeach Major-General William Boteler for actions he had carried out during the Rule of the Major-Generals in 1656. In response to the attempted impeachment, on 6 April 1659 the Grandees in the Army presented Parliament with a declaration calling for soldiers to be granted immunity from prosecution for all actions carried out during Oliver Cromwell's Protectorate. But accepting that the Commonwealthsmen were in the ascendency in Parliament, Desborough and Fleetwood forced a reluctant Richard Cromwell to use his powers as Lord Protector to dissolve Parliament on 22 April 1659.

The Grandees intended to keep Richard Cromwell as Lord Protector under Army control, without calling another parliament. Their position was undermined, however, when it became clear that the Army's rank and file still harboured support for the "Good Old Cause" of the Commonwealth, and still wanted to have their arrears of pay settled. This groundswell of support forced the Grandees to allow Richard Cromwell to re-call the Rump Parliament less than a month after the dissolution of the Third Protectorate Parliament.

There were two Speakers during the Third Protectorate Parliament and two Deputy Speakers. Chaloner Chute served as Speaker from 27 January 1659 until 14 April 1659, with two deputy speakers: Sir Lislebone Long from 9 March 1659 until 14 March 1659, and Thomas Bampfield from 16 March 1659 until 14 April 1659. Thomas Bampfield was Speaker from 15 April 1659 until 22 April 1659.

The Third Protectorate Parliament was preceded by the Second Protectorate Parliament and followed by the return of the Rump Parliament.

== Composition ==
The constituencies and distribution of seats, in England and Wales, for this Parliament reverted to being the same as in the Long Parliament. However the Scottish and Irish constituencies (see list in the First Protectorate Parliament article) remained unchanged.

=== Constituencies ===
Abbreviations: Boro' const. – Borough/Burgh constituencies, Shire const. – County/Shire constituencies, Univ. const. or const'ies – University constituencies, Total Const. – Total constituencies, Con. (or Const.) – Constituencies

Table 1: Constituencies and MPs, by type and country

Country	Boro' const.	Shire const.	Univ. const.	Total const.	Boro' MPs	Shire MPs	Univ. MPs	Total MPs
England	200	38	2	240	400	76	4	480
Wales	13	13	—	26	13	14	—	27
Scotland	9	20	—	29	10	20	—	30
Ireland	6	13	—	19	6	24	—	30
No. of constituencies	228	84	2	314				
Members returned	429	134	4	567	429	134	4	567

Table 2: Number of seats per constituency, by type and country

Country	Borough constituencies					Shire constituencies				Univ. const'ies			Total const.	Total MPs
Country	1 MP	2 MPs	4 MPs	Con.	MPs	1 MP	2 MPs	Con.	MPs	2 MPs	Con.	MPs	Total const.	Total MPs
England	4	194	2	200	400	—	38	38	76	2	2	4	240	480
Wales	13	—	—	13	13	12	1	13	14	—	—	—	26	27
Scotland	8	1	—	9	10	20	—	20	20	—	—	—	29	30
Ireland	6	—	—	6	6	2	11	13	24	—	—	—	19	30
No. of constituencies	31	195	2	228		34	50	84		2	2		314	
Members returned	31	390	8		429	34	100		134	4		4		567

Notes: (1) Monmouthshire (1 borough and 2 county seats) included in England, not Wales. (2) Dublin City and County treated as a county constituency (2 seats).

== See also ==
- List of parliaments of England
- List of MPs elected to the English parliament in 1659
