= Alexander Blake (MP) =

Alexander Blake was a Member of Parliament for Peterborough in 1654–5, 1656–8, and 1658–9.
