= Sir Gilbert Pickering, 1st Baronet =

Sir Gilbert Pickering Bt
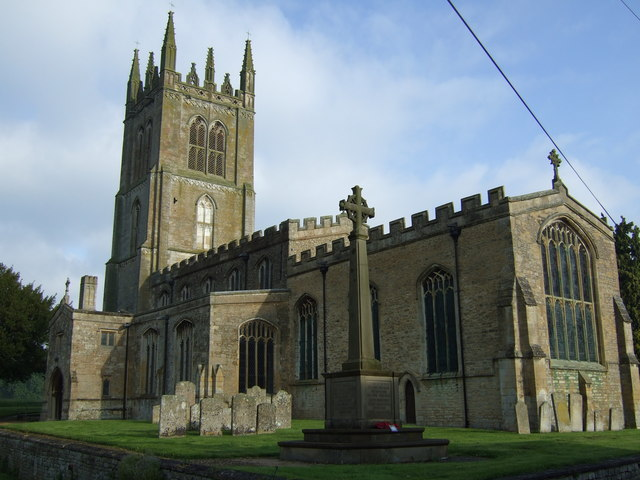
- St Mary the Virgin, Titchmarsh, Pickering's burial place

Lord Chamberlain
- In office 1655–1659

English Council of State/Committee of Safety
- In office 1649–1660

Member of Parliament for Northamptonshire
- In office April 1640 – May 1660 (Note: Re-elected as MP for Northamptonshire in the 1656 Second Protectorate Parliament, Pickering was elevated to Cromwell's Other House in December 1657, but resumed his seat when the Rump Parliament was reinstalled in May 1659)

Personal details
- Born: 10 March 1611 Titchmarsh, Northamptonshire
- Died: 17 October 1668 (aged 57) Titchmarsh, Northamptonshire
- Resting place: St. Mary the Virgin, Titchmarsh
- Spouse: Elizabeth Montagu (1638–1668 his death)
- Relations: Edward Montagu, 1st Earl of Sandwich (brother-in-law); John Dryden (cousin)
- Children: Eight sons, four daughters
- Education: Emmanuel College, Cambridge; Gray's Inn
- Occupation: Politician and religious radical

Sir Gilbert Pickering, 1st Baronet, 10 March 1611 to 17 October 1668, was a member of the landed gentry from Northamptonshire, and a religious Independent who supported Parliament in the Wars of the Three Kingdoms. An MP for Northamptonshire for most of the period from 1640 to 1660, during the 1649 to 1660 Interregnum he also served as Lord Chamberlain, sat on the English Council of State, and was appointed to Cromwell's Upper House in 1658.

Although appointed a judge at the Trial of Charles I in January 1649, Pickering attended only two sessions and did not sign the Execution warrant, which saved him from being classed as a regicide following the 1660 Stuart Restoration. He received a pardon with the help of his brother-in-law Edward Montagu, 1st Earl of Sandwich, but was banned from holding public office, and died at home in October 1668.

== Personal details ==
Gilbert Pickering was born 10 March 1611 in Titchmarsh, Northamptonshire, eldest son of Sir John Pickering (1585–1628), and Susannah Dryden (d.1661). A devout Puritan, his father was arrested in January 1627 for refusing to pay "loans" imposed by Charles I, and although released from prison a few months later due to illness, died in January 1628. Gilbert had two younger brothers, John (1615–1645), who became a colonel in the New Model Army and died of fever on active service, and Edward (1617–1698), as well as a sister Mary (1615–?).

In May 1638, Pickering married Elizabeth Montagu (d.1679), daughter of Sir Sidney Montagu, a judge in the Court of Requests. They had eight sons and four daughters, including his eldest child and heir John (1640–1703), Elizabeth (1642–1728), Oliver (1645–1669), Montegue (1654–1694).

== Career ==
Pickering graduated from Emmanuel College, Cambridge in 1625, entered Gray's Inn to study law in 1629, and shortly after his 1638 marriage purchased a baronetcy in Nova Scotia. Like his brother John, he was originally a Presbyterian, who wanted to restructure the Church of England along lines similar to the reformed Church of Scotland established by the Covenanters in 1639. He later became a religious Independent, one of those who rejected any State religion, and was suspected of being an Anabaptist, a sect viewed as heretical by other Protestants, and widely persecuted in both Europe and the New England Colonies as a result.

First elected as MP for Northamptonshire in April 1640, Pickering retained this seat in every Parliament until April 1660. When the First English Civil War began in August 1642, he joined the Parliamentarian Committee for Northamptonshire, and was most active as "a sequester and committee man". In late 1644, he supported Oliver Cromwell's criticisms of Essex and Manchester, the former for his defeat at Lostwithiel, the latter for failing to exploit victory at Marston Moor and bungling the Second Battle of Newbury. John Pickering, who fought at Marston Moor and Newbury, was one of the witnesses on whom Cromwell relied in the attack on Manchester that led to his removal under the Self-denying Ordinance.

Parliament's victory in 1646 was followed by two years of arguments over the peace settlement between moderate Presbyterians and the leadership of the New Model Army. Although Pickering largely avoided involvement, as an Independent he was generally viewed as an Army supporter, (Note: Independents were characterised by opposition to any state church, and included senior military leaders like Cromwell, Henry Ireton, and Thomas Harrison) and thus kept his seat in the Rump Parliament established after Pride's Purge in December 1648. He was appointed one of the judges in the January 1649 trial of Charles I, but only attended two sessions and did not sign the death warrant.

He remained MP for Northamptonshire through the Interregnum 1648–1660 and was appointed Lord Chamberlain to Oliver Cromwell in 1657. His public career ended in 1660. With the help of his brother-in-law Edward Montagu, 1st Earl of Sandwich, Pickering obtained a pardon from King Charles II. The original of the pardon delivered by Charles II on vellum in Latin is in the Pitts Theology Library of Emory University, MS no 109.

Pickering was also cousin to the poet, John Dryden, who grew up in Titchmarsh; monuments to Dryden and his parents were erected at Titchmarsh by his daughter Elizabeth, whose 1668 marriage was attended by her distant relative, Samuel Pepys. Sir Gilbert and his descendants are commemorated by tombs and memorials in Saint Mary the Virgin, Titchmarsh.

== Sources ==
- Hamilton, W.D, ed. (1890). Calendar of State Papers Domestic: Charles I, 1644-1645, Volume 503, November to December 1644. HMSO.
- Moseley, Virginia; Sgroi, Rosemary (2010). PICKERING, Sir John (1585-1628), of Titchmarsh, Northants in The History of Parliament: the House of Commons 1604–1629. CUP. ISBN 978-1107002258.
- Roberts, Keith (2004). "Pickering, John (bap. 1615, d. 1645)". Oxford Dictionary of National Biography (online ed.). Oxford University Press. doi:10.1093/ref:odnb/22210. (Subscription, Wikipedia Library access or UK public library membership required.)
- Venning, Keith (2004). "Pickering, Sir Gilbert, first baronet, appointed Lord Pickering under the Protectorate (1611-1668)". Oxford Dictionary of National Biography (online ed.). Oxford University Press. doi:10.1093/ref:odnb/22207. (Subscription, Wikipedia Library access or UK public library membership required.)
- Willmott, Robert Aris (1839). Lives of Sacred Poets.

Baronetage of Nova Scotia
New creation	Baronet (of Titchmarsh); 1638–1668	Succeeded by John Pickering
