= High Sheriff of Surrey =

Ceremonial officer of Surrey, England

The list of known High Sheriffs of Surrey extends back to 1066. At various times the High Sheriff of Surrey was also High Sheriff of Sussex (1229–1231, 1232–1240, 1242–1567, 1571–1635).

== 1066–1228 ==
(High Sheriffs of Surrey only)

- 1066–1080: Ansculf de Picquigny
- 1086: Ranulf
- 1098: Ranulf
- 1103: Ralph FitzNigel
- 1105: Wymond
- 1106: Roger of Huntingdon
- 1106–1125: Gilbert the Knight
- 1126–1128: Fulk
- 1129: Richard Basset and Aubrey de Vere
- c1155: Ralph Picot
- 1155: Hugh de Wateville
- 1155: Hilary of Chichester the Bishop of Chichester
- 1160–1162: Hilary of Chichester
- 1163–1183: Gervase de Cornhill
- c.1189–1192: Henry de Cornhill
- 1194–1199: Robert of Thornham
- 1204: Richard de Maisy and William de Sancto Laudo
- 1205–1207: Robert of Thornham
- 1207–1212: John FitzHugh
- 1213–1215: Reginald de Cornhill
- 1215: Hubert de Burgh
- 1216: Engelard de Cigogné
- 1217–1226: Earl William de Warenne (6th Earl of Surrey)
- 1226: Gilbert de Abinger
- 1227: John de Gatesden

== 1229–1398 ==
(Sheriffs of Surrey and Sussex)

Henry III (1216–1272)- Continued
- 1229:
- 1231: Robert de Shardlow / Henry de Wintershul
- 1232: Peter de Rivaux / Henry de Chancellis
- 1234: Simon de Etchingham /Joel de Sancto Germano
- 1235: Henry of Bath / Simon de Echingham/ Joel de Sancto Germano
- 1236–37: John de Gatesden / Philip de Crofts
- 1238: John de Gatesden
- 1239: John de Gatesden / Philip de Crofts
- 1240–1241: Gregory de Oxted
- 1241: Philip de Crofts
- 1242–44: Sir Ralph de Camoys
- 1245–48: Robert le Savage
- 1249–51: Nicholas de Wauncy
- 1252: William and Nicholas de Mucheldovere (Munchcledevr)
- 1254: Amfred de Fering
- 1254: William de Mucheldovere
- 1254: Amfred (Humphrey) de Fering
- 1255–56: Sir Geoffrey de Cruce
- 1257: Gerard de Evinton
- 1258: David de Jarpenville
- 1259–60: John de Wauton
- 1261: William la Zouche (William Aguillon) - part
- 1261: John de Wauton
- 1263: Roger de Loges
- 1267: Robert Aguillon
- 1267: Ralph Saunzaver
- 1267: William de la Leye
- 1268–69: Roger de Loges
- 1270–71: Matthew de Hastings

Edward I (1272–1307)

- 1272–73: Matthew de Hastings
- 1274: William de Herne
- 1275–77: John de Wanton
- 1278–79: Emery de Cancellis
- 1282: Sir Geoffrey "de" Pickford Kt [Geoffrey of Pitchford]
- 1280–84: Nicholas le Gras
- 1285–86: Richard de Pevenese
- 1287–91: William de Pageham (Pakenham)
- 1292–97: Robert de Glaumorgan
- 1298–1301: John Abel
- 1302–03: Walter de Geddinge (John Harneys)
- 1304–06: Robert de la Knole

Edward II (1307–1327)

- 1307: Walter de Geddinge
- 1308–12: William of Henle & Robert de Stangrave/William de Mare
- 1313–14: Peter de Vienna
- 1315–16: William de Mare
- 1317: Walter le Gras
- 1318: Walter le Gras / Peter de Worldham
- 1319–20: Peter de Worldham / Henry Hussey
- 1321: Henry Hussey
- 1322–23: Nicholas Gentil
- 1324–26: Peter de Worldham/Andrew Medested

Edward III (1327- 1377)

- 1327: Nicholas Gentil
- 1328–30: Nicholas Gentil/Robert de Stangave
- 1331: John Dabernon
- 1332–33: William Vaughan
- 1334–36: William Vaughan/ John Dabernon
- 1337–38: William Vaughan
- 1339: Godfrey de Hunston
- 1340: Godfrey de Hunston/William de Northo
- 1341: William de Northo/Hugo de Bowsey
- 1342–43: Andrew Peverel/Hugo de Bowsey
- 1344: William de Northo
- 1345–47: Regin de Forrister
- 1348: Roger Dabernon
- 1349–51: Thomas Hoo
- 1352–53: Richard de St Oweyn
- 1354: Simon de Codington
- 1355: Roger de Lukenor
- 1356: William North
- 1357–59: Thomas de Hoo
- 1360–62: ???
- 1363: Simon de Codington
- 1364: Ranulph Thurnham
- 1365: John Wayleys
- 1366: John Weyville
- 1367–68: Sir Andrew Sackville
- 1369–70: Ranulph Thurnham
- 1371: William Neidegate
- 1372: Roger Dalingrugge
- 1373: Nicholas Wilcombe of Wappingthorne in Steyning, Sussex
- 1374: Robert de Loxley
- 1375: Robert Atte Hele
- 1376: John St Clere

Richard II (1377–1399)

- 1377: William Percy of Woodmancote, Sussex
- 1378: Sir Edmund Fitzherbert of Ewhurst, Sussex
- 1379: John de Hadresham of Lingfield and Crowhurst, Surrey
- 1380: Nicholas Slyfield (1320-1397) of Slyfield Manor, Great Bookham, Surrey
- 1381: William Percy of Woodmancote, Sussex
- 1382: William Weston of West Clandon, Surrey
- 1383: Sir William de Waleys of Glynde, Sussex
- 1384: Robert Rutborne
- 1385: Richard Hurst
- 1386–87: Thomas Jardyn of South Mundham and Bowley, Sussex
- 1388: Edward de St John
- 1389: Robert Atte Mille of Guildford, Surrey
- 1390: John Robert de Eckingham
- 1390: John Mill of Gretham
- 1391: Nicholas Carew of Beddington Park, Surrey
- 1392: Thomas Jardyn
- 1393: Nicholas Slyfield (1320-1397) of Slyfield Manor, Great Bookham, Surrey
- 1393: John de Uvedale of Titsey Place and Wickham, Hants
- 1394: Edward St John
- 1395: John Ashburnham of Ashburnham, Sussex
- 1396: William Fienes
- 1397: John Salerne of Rye and Leigh in Iden, Sussex
- 1398: William Fienes

== 1399–1509 ==
(High Sheriffs of Surrey and Sussex)

Henry IV (1399–1412)
- 1399: Radul Codington of Cuddington
- 1400: Nicholas Carew of Beddington Park, Surrey
- 1401: John Pelham
- 1402: John Ashburnham of Ashburnham, Sussex
- 1403–04: Robert Atte Mulle
- 1405: Sir Philip St Clere
- 1406: Sir Thomas Sackvile
- 1407: John Clipsham of Imbhams and Guildford, Surrey
- 1408: William Verd
- 1409: John Ashburnham of Ashburnham, Sussex
- 1410: John Warner Campie
- 1411: John Waterton of Bramley

Henry V (1412–1422)

- 1412–13: John Haysham
- 1414: John Wintershall of Wintershall and Shalford, Surrey
- 1415: John Clipsham of Imbhams and Guildford, Surrey
- 1416: John Uvedale of Titsey Place and Wickham Hants
- 1417: William Weston of Dedswell in Send, Surrey and Hindhall in Buxted, Sussex
- 1418: James Knotesford
- 1419: John Clipsham of Imbhams and Guildford, Surrey
- 1420: John Hace
- 1421: John Bolvey / James Knotesford

Henry VI (1422–1461)

- 1422–23:Sir Roger Fiennes of Herstmonceux, Sussex
- 1424:John Wintershall of Wintershall and Shalford, Surrey
- 1425:John Clipsham of Imbhams and Guildford, Surrey
- 1426:Thomas Lewkenor
- 1427:John Ferriby
- 1428:William Warbleton
- 1429:John Wintershall of Wintershall and Shalford, Surrey
- 1430:William Uvedale of Titsey Place and Wickham Hants
- 1431:William Finch
- 1432:Sir Thomas Lewkenor
- 1433:John Anderne
- 1434:Richard Waller
- 1435:Sir Roger Fiennes of Herstmonceux, Sussex
- 1436:Richard Dalingrugg
- 1437:John Ferriby
- 1438: Sir Thomas Uvedale of Titsey Place and Wickham Hants
- 1439: James Fiennes, 1st Baron Saye and Sele, of Kemsing and Seal
- 1440:Roger Lewkenor
- 1441:Nicholas Carew
- 1442:Walter Strickland
- 1443:John Stanley
- 1444:John Basket
- 1445:Nicholas Carew
- 1446:Nicholas Husey
- 1447:William Belknape
- 1448:Robert Radmill
- 1449:Nicholas Carew
- 1450:John Pennycocke
- 1451:John Lewkenor
- 1452:Thomas Yard
- 1453:Sir Richard Fiennes
- 1454:Walter Devenish
- 1455:John Knotesford
- 1456:Sir Thomas Cobham
- 1457:Nicholas Husey
- 1458:Thomas Basset
- 1459: Sir Thomas Tresham
- 1460:Robert Fiennes

Edward IV (1461–1483)

- 1461:Nicholas Gaynesford
- 1462-3:Walter Denis
- 1464:Thomas Goring
- 1465: Sir Thomas Uvedale of Titsey Place and Wicham Hants
- 1466:William Cheney
- 1467:Thomas Vaughan
- 1468:Sir Roger Lewkenor
- 1469:Nicholas Gaynesford
- 1470:Richard Lewkenor
- 1471:Thomas St. Leger
- 1472:John Gaynesford
- 1473:Nicholas Gaynesford
- 1474:Thomas Lewkenor
- 1475:Thomas Echingham
- 1476:John Wode
- 1477:Sir Henry Roos
- 1478:William Weston
- 1479:Thomas Combs
- 1480:John Ebrington
- 1481:Thomas Fiennes
- 1482:John Apseley

Richard III (1483–1485)

- 1483:Sir Henry Roos
- 1484:John Dudley
- 1485:John Norbury / Richard Gainsford

Henry VII (1485–1509)

- 1486:Nicholas Gaynesford
- 1487:Thomas Coombes
- 1488:William Merston
- 1489:Robert Morley
- 1490:John Apseley
- 1491:Richard Lewkenor
- 1492:Edward Dawtree
- 1493:John Leigh
- 1494:John Coke
- 1495:John Apseley
- 1496:Richard Lewkenor
- 1497:Matthew Brown
- 1498: Richard Sackville
- 1499:John Coke
- 1500:Thomas Ashburnham
- 1501:John Gainsford
- 1502:Sir Richard Carew
- 1503:John Apseley
- 1504:Rad Shirley
- 1505:Richard Sackvile
- 1506:Goddard Oxenbridge
- 1507:William Ashburnham
- 1508:Thomas Morton
- 1509:Sir Thomas Fiennes

== 1509–1566 ==
(High Sheriffs of Surrey and Sussex)

Henry VIII (1509–1546)
- 1510: John Leigh
- 1511: Edward Lewkenor
- 1512: Sir Roger Lewkenor
- 1513: Sir Godfrey Oxenbridge
- 1514: Richard Shirley of Wiston, Sussex
- 1515: Roger Copley
- 1516: Sir John Leigh
- 1517: William Ashburnham
- 1518: Sir John Gainsford
- 1519: Nicholas Carew of Beddington Park, Surrey
- 1520: Sir Godfrey Oxenbridge
- 1521: John Scott
- 1522: Sir Edward Bray
- 1523: Richard Covert
- 1524: John William Ashburnham
- 1525: Sir Thomas West, Baron de la Warr
- 1526: Richard Shirley of Wiston, Sussex
- 1527: John Sackville of Chiddingly, Sussex
- 1528: Sir John Dawtry
- 1529: Richard Belingham
- 1530: Sir Roger Copley
- 1531: Sir William Goring of Burton, Sussex
- 1532: Sir Roger Lewkenor
- 1533: Christopher More of Loseley, Surrey
- 1534: John Palmer of Angmering, Sussex
- 1535: Richard Belingham
- 1536: Sir William Goring of Burton, Sussex
- 1537: Sir Richard Page
- 1538: Nicholas Gainsford
- 1539: Sir Edward Bray of Henfield and Selmeston, Sussex and the Vachery, Shere, Surrey
- 1540: Sir Christopher Moore of Loseley, Surrey
- 1541: John Sackville of Chiddingly, Sussex
- 1542: Thomas Darell
- 1543: Richard Belingham
- 1544: John Palmer
- 1546: John Thetcher
- 1546: John Sackville of Chiddingly, Sussex

Edward VI (1546–1553)

- 1547: Sir John Dawtrey
- 1548: Sir Thomas Cawarden of Bletchingley, Surrey
- 1549: John Scott
- 1550: Sir Nicholas Pelham of Laughton, Sussex
- 1551: Sir William Goring of Burton, Sussex
- 1552: Robert Oxenbridge (1508-1574) of Brede, Sussex
- 1553: Sir Anthony Browne, 1st Viscount Montagu of Battle Abbey and Cowdray Park, Sussex

Mary (1553–1558)

- 1553: Sir Thomas Saunders of Charlwood, Surrey
- 1554: John Covert of Ifield and Slaugham, Sussex
- 1555: William Saunders of Ewell, Surrey
- 1556: Sir Edward Gage
- 1557: John Ashburnham of Asburnham, Sussex
- 1558: William Moore

Elizabeth I (1558–1603)

- 1558:Sir Thomas Palmer of Parham, Sussex
- 1559:John Colepeper
- 1560:John Stidolph
- 1561:Henry Goring
- 1562:William Gresham
- 1563:Richard Covert
- 1564:Anthony Pelham
- 1565:William Dawtry

== 1566–1635 ==
(High Sheriffs of Surrey only)

Elizabeth I (1558–1603) – Continued

- 1566:Anthony Palmer / William Dawtrey of More House, Petworth, Sussex
- 1567:Francis Carew of Beddington, Surrey
- 1568:Sir Henry Weston of Sutton Place, Surrey
- 1569:Thomas Lyfield of Stoke d'Abernon, Surrey
- 1570:Sir Thomas Browne of Betchworth Castle, Surrey

(High Sheriffs of Surrey and Sussex)

Elizabeth I (1558–1603) – Continued

- 1571:John Pelham of Laughton, near Lewes, Sussex
- 1571:Thomas Palmer of Angmering, Sussex
- 1572:Francis Shirley of West Grinstead, Sussex
- 1573:John Rede / Richard Polsted of Albury, Surrey
- 1574:Henry Pelham
- 1575:William Gresham
- 1576:Sir Thomas Shirley of Wiston, near Steyning, Sussex
- 1576 (Apr–Nov): Herbert Pelham of Michelham Priory, near Hailsham, Sussex
- 1577:George Goring of Ovingdean, Lewes and Danny Park, Sussex
- 1578:Sir William Moore
- 1579:William Morley of Glynde, Sussex
- 1580:Edward "Edmond" Slyfield (1521-13 February 1590) of Clandon Manor, West Clandon, Surrey and Slyfield Manor, Great Bookham, Surrey
- 1581:Sir Thomas Browne
- 1582:Walter Covert of Slaugham, Sussex
- 1583:Thomas Bishopp of Parham, Sussex
- 1584:Richard Bostock of Tandridge, Surrey
- 1585:Nicholas Parker of Ratton and Willingdon
- 1586:Richard Browne of Knowle in Cranleigh, Surrey
- 1587:John Carrell
- 1588:Thomas Pelham of Laughton, Sussex
- 1589:Herbert Pelham of Michelham Priory, near Hailsham, Sussex
- 1590:Robert Linsey (Livesey)
- 1591:Sir Walter Covert of Slaugham, Sussex
- 1592:Sir Nicholas Parker of Ratton and Willingdon, Sussex
- 1593:William Gardiner of Bermondsey, Surrey
- 1594:Richard Leech of Fletching, Sussex
- 1595:Edmund Culpeper
- 1596:George More
- 1597:James Colebrand of Chichester, Sussex
- 1598: Thomas Eversfield, of Denne Park, Horsham, West Sussex
- 1599:Edmund Bowyer of Camberwell, Surrey
- 1600:Thomas Bishopp of Parham, Sussex
- 1601:John Ashburnham
- 1602:Robert Lynsey (Livesey)

James I (1603–1625)

- 1603:Robert Linsey (Livesey)
- 1604:Sir Henry Goring
- 1605:Sir Edward Culpeper
- 1606:Sir Thomas Hoskings
- 1607:Herbert Morley of Glynde, Sussex
- 1608:Sir George Gunter
- 1609:Sir Thomas Hunt
- 1610:John Lountesford
- 1611:Edward Bellingham
- 1612:William Wignall
- 1613:Edward Goring
- 1614:Sir John Willdigos
- 1615:Rowland Trappes/Sir John Morgan
- 1616:Sir John Shirley of Isfield, Sussex
- 1617:John Middleton
- 1618:Sir John Howland
- 1619:Nicholas Eversfield of The Grove, Hollington, Hastings
- 1620:Richard Michelborne
- 1621:Sir Francis Leigh of Addington, Surrey
- 1622:Sir Thomas Springett
- 1623:Sir Ben Pelham
- 1624:Ambrose Browne of Betchworth Castle, Dorking, Surrey

Charles I (1625–1649)

- 1625: Edward Alford of Offington, Sussex
- 1626: Sir Thomas Bowyer, 1st Baronet of Leythorne, North Mundham
- 1627: Edward Jordan
- 1628: Sir Stephen Boord
- 1629: Anthony May
- 1630: Sir William Walter of Wimbledon, Surrey
- 1631: Sir Robert Morley of Glynde Place, Sussex (died 1632)
- 1632: Sir John Chapman
- 1633: Richard Evelyn
- 1634: Sir William Culpeper, 1st Baronet of Wakehurst
- 1635: Sir William Morley
- 1636(Jan-Nov): Sir William Morley of Halnaker, Boxgrove, Sussex

== 1636–1702 ==
(High Sheriffs of Surrey only)

Charles I (1625–1649) – Continued
- 1636: Sir Francis Vincent
- 1636: Sir Anthony Vincent
- 1637: Nicholas Stoughton of Stoughton, near Guildford, Surrey
- 1638: Sir John Gresham
- 1639: Sir John Howland
- 1640: Thomas Smith
- 1641: George Price
- 1642: Sir John Denham
- 1643–1645: Edmund Jordan
- 1645: Sir Matthew Brand
- 1645: Richard Bettinson
- 1646: William Wymondeshold
- 1647: John Turner of Ham
- 1648: Thomas Thorold
- 1648: Thomas Morton

Commonwealth (1649–1660)

- 1649: John Carpenter replaced by Thomas Woodward 13 February 1650
- 1650: William Hynde
- 1651: Richard Farrand
- 1652: Edward Knipe
- 1653: Anthony Smyth of Brackhouse /John Parker/Henry White of Putney
- 1654: Daniel Harvey of Coombe, Surrey
- 1655: Colonel Thomas Pride
- 1656: John Blackwell
- 1657: Thomas Walker
- 1658: Jeffrey Howland
- 1659:

Charles II (1660–1685)

- 1660: Henry Weston
- 1661: Roger Duncombe
- 1662: Sir Nicholas Stoughton
- 1663: Sir Walter Plomer
- 1664: Sir William Humble, 1st Baronet
- 12 November 1665: Sir John Evelyn, 1st Baronet
- 7 November 1666: Dawes Wymondesold
- 6 November 1667: Sir Richard Stydolph, 1st Baronet
- 6 November 1668: Sir William More, 2nd Baronet
- 25 November 1668: George Woodroffe, of Poyle, Seale
- 11 November 1669: James Zouche, of Woking
- 4 November 1670: Walter More
- 9 November 1671: Ellis Crisp
- 11 November 1672: James Burton
- 10 November 1673: Matthew Andrews
- 12 November 1673: Edmund Smyth
- 5 November 1674: Sigismund Stydolph
- 12 November 1674: Matthew Andrews
- 1674: John Appleby
- 15 November 1675: Robert Knightley, of Ashsteed
- 10 November 1676: Sigismund Stydolph
- 18 November 1676: Thomas Saunders
- 15 November 1677: Sir Edward Bromfield
- 17 November 1677: Anthony Brian, of Bermondsey
- 29 November 1677: Thomas Jordan, of Gatwick
- 1 December 1677: Thomas Newton, of Stoke
- 14 November 1678: Robert Wilson
- 23 November 1678: Anthony Brian
- 13 November 1679: Sir Robert Hatton
- 4 November 1680: Sigismund Stydolph
- 1680: Joseph Reeve
- 1681: Peter Daniel of Clapham, Surrey
- 1682: Anthony Rawlins
- 1683: William Inwood
- 1684: Samuel Lewin
- 1685: George Turner

James II (1685–1689)

- 1686: John Weston/George Gore/Morgan Randyll of Chilworth, Surrey
- 1687: ? Le Cane
- 1688: Peter de Lannoy/Sigismund Stydolph
- 1689: Sir Edward Bromfield/George Meggott

William and Mary (1689–1702)

- 1690: Walter Howland
- 1691: George Attwood
- 1692: Michael Edwards
- 1693: John Buckworthreplaced by Thomas Bouroughs then Henry Wheatley
- 1694: Henry Bartelott
- 1695: John Pettyward
- 1696: William Mason
- 1697: Thomas Lowfield
- 1698: Edward Budgen
- 1699: Leonard Wessell of Tadworth Court, Surrey
- 1700–1701: Robert Corffe/John Shorter

== 1702–1799 ==
- 1702: John Deleau/Edward Woodward/William Woodward of West Dean, near Midhurst
- 1703: James Tichborne
- 1704: William Fenwick
- 1705: William Hammond
- 1706: Isaac Shard
- 1707:John Dewey
- 1708: William Steavens
- 1709: John Evershed
- 1710: William Genew/Walter Kent of Kingston-upon-Thames, Surrey
- 1711: John Mitchell
- 1712: Richard Oldner
- 1713: Joseph Wandale
- 1714: James Plume
- 1715: Joseph Bagnoll
- 1716: Vincent Sheppard
- 1717: Sir Charles Cox of Southwark, Surrey/John Vanhattem
- 1718: Nathaniel Roffey
- 1719: William Belitha
- 1720: Wight Woolley
- 1721: Peter Theobald
- 1722: John Neale
- 1723: John Essington of Wandsworth, Surrey
- 1724: William Nicholl
- 1725: John Palmer
- 1726: Sir Thomas Stevens
- 1727: John Wall
- 1728: Sir Matthew Decker, Bt of Richmond, Surrey
- 1729: Samuel Kent of Vauxhall, Surrey
- 1730: Percival Lewis
- 1731: Joshua Smith
- 1732: Ralph Thrale of Streatham (1698–1758), MP, father of Henry Thrale and owner of Anchor Brewery, Southwark
- 1733: Maltis Ryall
- 1734: John Copeland
- 1735: Joseph Chitty
- 1737: John Rush
- 1738: William Clarke/Robert Booth
- 1739: William Browning – Felmonger of Bermondsey. Born 1676 Burton Latimer. Buried 1758 St. Mary Magdalen, Bermondsey, where there is a marble memorial.
- 1740: Benjamin Hayes
- 1741: Thomas Bevois
- 1742: Isaac Eles
- 1744: Elias Bird
- 1745: Sir Peter Thompson of Mill St, Bermondsey
- 1746: Thomas Page
- 1747: Abraham Atkins
- 1748: Samuel Atkinson
- 1749: Jeremiah Crutchley
- 1750: Jacob Tonson Jnr
- 1751: John Smith
- 1752: Edward Saunderson
- 1753: Edward Langton
- 1754: Henry Talbot
- 1755: John Mackerill
- 1756: Charles Devon
- 1757: Joseph Mawbey, later Sir Joseph Mawbey, 1st Baronet of Botleys, Surrey
- 1758: Edmund Shallett, of Sheer
- 1759: Daniel Ponton
- 1760: Thomas Bridges
- 1761: John Dawson of Lambeth
- 1762: Sir William Bridges Baldwin
- 1763: Thomas Page
- 1764: James Morris of Lambeth
- 1765: John Hughes
- 1766: John Small
- 1767: John Durand, of Woodcote Lodge, Carshalton
- 1768: Richard Barwell (William Barwell?)
- 1769: John Thornton
- 1770: Sir Richard Hotham of Merton Place
- 1771: Sir Thomas Kent
- 1772: Morgan Rice
- 1773: Richard Earle Bedford
- 1774: Thomas James
- 1775: Isaac Akerman
- 1776: George Ward
- 1777: William Brightwell Sumner
- 1778: John Lewin Smith
- 1779: James Bordien
- 1780: Charles Eyre
- 1781: William Northey
- 1782: Sir Abraham Pitches
- 1783: Henry Boulton of Leatherhead
- 1784: William Aldersey
- 1785:James Payne of Chertsey
- 1786: Theodore Henry Broadhead of Carshalton
- 1787: Richard Ladbroke of Tadworth Court
- 1788: Thomas Creuze of Woodbridge
- 1789: Thomas Sutton of East Molesey
- 1790: Samuel Long of Carshalton Park, Surrey
- 1791: Henry Byne of Carshalton, Surrey
- 1792: William Woodroffe of Poyle Park
- 1793: John Hodsdon Durand of Carshalton, Surrey and West Dean Place, Sussex
- 1794: Charles Bowles
- 1795: Thomas Turton, later Sir Thomas Turton, 1st Baronet of Starborough Castle, Surrey
- 1796: Thomas Sutton of Hurst House, East Molesey
- 1797: Robert Taylor
- 1798: James Trotter
- 1799: Robert Hankey

== 19th century ==
- 5 February 1800: George Griffin Stonestreet, of Clapham
- 11 February 1801: Bryant Barret, of Stockwell
- 3 February 1802: Edward Peppin, of Walton Lodge
- 10 February 1803: John Pooley Kensington, of Putney
- 1 February 1804: William Borrodaile, of Streatham
- 6 February 1805: Robert Chatfield, of Croydon
- 1 February 1806: Kennard Smith, of Cheam
- 4 February 1807: James Newsome, of Wandsworth Lodge
- 3 February 1808: James Mangles of Woodbridge, near Guildford
- 6 February 1809: Edmund Bilke, of Southwark
- 31 January 1810: Henry Edmund Austen, of Shalford House
- 8 February 1811: George Tritton, of West Hill, Wandsworth
- 24 January 1812: Thomas Starling Benson, of Champion Lodge
- 10 February 1813: Henry Bridges, of Ewell
- 4 February 1814: Richard Birt, of Hall Grove
- 13 February 1815: James Laing, of Streatham
- 1816: Benjamin Bernard
- 1817: Thomas Lett the younger of Dulwich
- 1818: Henry Peters of Betchworth Castle, Surrey
- 1819: William Speer of Thames Ditton
- 1820: Hutches Trower of Unsted Wood
- 1821: John Spicer
- 1822: Charles Nicholas Pallmer of Norbiton House, Surrey
- 1823: Charles Hampden Turner of Rook's Nest
- 1824: Florence Young
- 1825: John Barnard Hankey of Fetcham Park
- 1826: Henry Drummond
- 1827: William Crawford of Pippbrook
- 1828: Thomas Hope
- 1829: Felix Calvert Ladbroke
- 1830: Sir William George Hylton Joliffe, Bt. of Merstham
- 1831: Harvey Combe, of Cobham Park
- 1832: Miles Stringer, of Effingham
- 1833: Sir Henry Fletcher, 3rd Baronet, of Ashley Park
- 1834: George Thomas Nicholson, of Waverley Abbey
- 1835: James Shudi Broadwood, of Lyne House
- 1836: William Henry Cooper, of Pains Hill
- 1837: Thomas Alcock, of Kingswood Warren
- 1838: Thomas Chaloner Bisse Chaloner, of Potnalls Park
- 1839: Samuel Paynter, of Richmond
- 1840: Peter John Locke King, of Woburn-Farm
- 1841: William Leveson-Gower of Titsey Place
- 1842: Charles Barclay of Bury-Hill
- 1843: Richard Sumner, of Puttenham Priory
- 1844: William Straeham, of Ashurst
- 1845: Richard Fuller, of the Rookery
- 1846: Charles McNivin, of Perrysfield
- 1847: Joseph Bonsor, of Poulsden
- 1848: Lee Steere, of Jayes
- 1849: William Francis Gamul Farmer, of Nonsuch-Park
- 1850: James William Freshfield, of Moor-Place
- 1851: John Sparkes, of Gosden-House
- 1852: George Robert Smith of Selsden, Croydon
- 1853: Thomas Grissell, of Norbury Park, Leatherhead
- 1854: Robert Gosling, of Botleys Park
- 1855: James Gadesden, of Ewell Castle, Ewell
- 1856: Edward Richard Northey, of Woodcote House, Epsom
- 1857: John Labouchere, of Broom Hall, Dorking
- 1858: George John Cavendish, of Lyne Grove, Chertsey
- 1859: Sir Walter Farquhar, 3rd Baronet, of Polesden, Leatherhead
- 1860: William John Evelyn, of Wootton, near Dorking
- 1861: Samuel Gurney, of Carshalton
- 1862: Joseph Godman, of Park Hatch, Godalming
- 1863: Lewis Lloyd, of Monks Orchard, near Croydon
- 1864: Thomas Price of Heywood, Cobham
- 1865: John Bradshaw of Knowle, Guildford
- 1866: John Frederick Bateman, of Moor Park, Farnham
- 1867: William Gilpin, died and replaced by James More-Molyneux of Loseley Park, Guildford
- 1868: Robert Carter, of the Grove, Epsom
- 1869: Robert Hay Murray, of West End Lodge, Byfleet
- 1870: William Farnell-Watson, of Henfold, near Dorking
- 1871: Money Wigram, of Esher Place
- 1872: Albert George Sandeman of The Hollies, Weybridge
- 1873: Gordon Wyatt Clark, of Mickleham Hall, Dorking
- 1874: John Coyscarne Sim, of Coombs Wood, Kingston-on-Thames
- 1875: Granville William Gresham Leveson-Gower, of Titsey Place, Limpsfield
- 1876: Charles Churchill, of Weybridge Park, Weybridge
- 1877: William Robert Gamul Farmer, of Nonsuch Park, Cheam
- 1878: Robert Barclay, of Bury Hill, Dorking
- 1879: John Barnard Hankey, of Fetcham Park, Leatherhead
- 1880: Sir Francis Burdett, Bt. of Ancaster House, Richmond Hill
- 1881: Richard Henry Combe, of Pierrepont House, Frensham, Farnham
- 1882: Henry John Tritton, of Ewell House, Ewell
- 1883: James Stewart Hodgson, of Denbigh, Haslemere
- 1884: John Henderson, of Randall's Park, Leatherhead
- 1885: Charles Combe, of Cobham Park
- 1886: George James Murray, of Mytchett Place, Frimley
- 1887: Walter Blanford Waterlow, High Trees, Redhill
- 1888: Francis Henry Baring of Banstead Park
- 1889: Augustus William Gadesden, of Ewell Castle, Ewell
- 1890: James Hudson of Capenor Nutfield, Surrey
- 1891: John Fisher Eastwood, of Esher Lodge, Esher
- 1892: James Brand, of Sanderstead Court, Croydon
- 1893: Sir Jeremiah Colman, of Gatton Park
- 1894: Sir Frederick Wigan, 1st Baronet, of Clare Lawn, Upper Sheen
- 1895: Edward Lee Rowcliffe, of Hall Place, Hascombe, Godalming,
- 1896: Sir Edward Hamer Carbutt, Bt., of Nanhurst, Cranleigh
- 1897: William Keswick, of Eastwick Park, Great Bookham, near Leatherhead,
- 1898: Lawrence James Baker of Ottershaw Park, Chertsey,
- 1899: Sir John Whittaker Ellis, Bt., of Buccleuch House, Richmond

== 20th century ==
- 1900: Charles Hoskins Master, of Barrow Green, Oxted,
- 1901: Herbert Gosling, of Botley's Park, Chertsey,
- 1902: Max Leonard Waechter, of Terrace House, Richmond,
- 1903: Sir Walpole Lloyd Greenwell, of Marden Park, Woldingham,
- 1904: Edward David Stern, of Fan Court, Chertsey,
- 1905: Walter Moresby Chinnery of Hatchford, Cobham died 29 March 1905 and replaced by Sir Philip Waterlow, 2nd Baronet
- 1906: Ralph Forster of the Grange, Sutton
- 1907: Wickham Noakes of Selsdon Park, Croydon
- 1908: Basil Braithwaite of Hookfield, Epsom
- 1909: Sir Frederick Thomas Edridge of Bramley Croft, Croydon
- 1910: Sir Harry Waechter of Ramsnest, Chiddingfold, Godalming
- 1911: Sir William Chance, 2nd Baronet of Orchards, near Godalming
- 1912: Benjamin Vincent Sellon Brodie of Brockham Warren, Betchworth
- 1913: Sir Richard Charles Garton, of Lythe Hill, Haslemere
- 1914: St Loe Strachey of Newlands Corner, Merrow, Guildford
- 1915: Charles Tyrrell Giles, of Copse Hill House, Wimbledon
- 1916: Beresford Rimington Heaton, of Round Down, Gomshall
- 1917: Alfred Withall Aston, of Woodcote Grove, Epsom
- 1918: James Henry Renton, of Mervel Hill, Hambledon
- 1919: John Henry Bridges, of Ewell Court, Ewell
- 1920: Major Henry Herbert Gordon Clark, of Mickleham Hall, Mickleham
- 1921: Edmund Charles Pendleton Hull of Earlswood Mount, Redhill
- 1922: Frederick Gordon Dalziel Colman of Great Burgh, Burgh Heath, near Banstead
- 1923: Robert Wyvill Barclay of Logmore, Dorking
- 1924: Henry Oberlin Serpell of West Croft Park, Chobham, Woking
- 1925: Cuthbert Eden Heath of Anstie Grange, Holmwood, Dorking,
- 1926: Charles Stanley Gordon Clark of Fetcham Lodge, Fetcham
- 1927: Robert Cron Henderson of Nithsdale, Sutton,
- 1928: Brigadier-General Edward Boustead Cuthbertson of The Old House, Betchworth
- 1929: Charles Harvey Combe of Cobham Park, Cobham
- 1930: Hubert Cecil Rickett of Hawthorns, Overton Road, Sutton, Surrey
- 1931: Sir Edward John Holland, of Silverdale, Sutton, Surrey
- 1932: Sir Stanley Machin, Kt., of Cleeve, Oatlands, Weybridge, Surrey
- 1933: William James Mallinson, of The Grange, Hackbridge
- 1934: Sir John Jarvis, 1st Baronet, of Hascombe Court, near Godalming
- 1935: Sir Laurence Edward Halsey of Gooserye, Worplesdon,
- 1936: Charles Edward Hoskins Master of Barrow Green Court, Oxted
- 1937: Sir Malcolm Fraser, 1st Baronet of Pixholme Court, Dorking
- 1938: Charles Micklem of Long Cross House, near Chertsey
- 1939: Theodore Howard Lloyd of Harewoods, Outwood
- 1940: John Edward Humphery of Santon House, Flanchford, Reigate
- 1941: Dermot William Berdoe-Wilkinson of Knowle, Cranleigh, Guildford
- 1942: Ian Forest Anderson of Old Surrey Hall, Dormansland
- 1943: Reginald Tristram Harper of Lamberts, Hascombe
- 1944: Francis Paget Hett of Littleworth, Esher
- 1945: Lawrence Henry Seccombe of Queenwood, Ottershaw, Chertsey
- 1946: Denzil Morton Stanley of Furzehill Place, Pirbright
- 1947: Cecil Bevis Bevis, of Alderhurst, Englefield Green
- 1948: Ian Forest Anderson, of Old Surrey Hall, Dormansland, Lingfield
- 1949: Henry Walter Neville Lawrence, of Grey Walls, Hook Heath, Woking
- 1950: Arnold Adrian Jarvis of Pirbright
- 1951: Francis Paget Hett of Littleworth, Esher
- 1952: Granville Brian Chetwynd-Stapylton of Walton-on-Thames
- 1953: John Edward Ferguson of Busbridge Wood, Godalming
- 1954: Henry Michael Gordon Clark, of the Old Cottage, Mickleham
- 1955: Charles Guy Cubitt, of High Barn, Effingham, Leatherhead
- 1956: Sir Ambrose Keevil, of Bayards, Warlingham
- 1957: Captain Evelyn Henry Tschudi Broadwood of Lyne, Capel
- 1958: Nigel Charles Tritton, of Wildcroft, Betchworth
- 1959: Samuel Leslie Bibby of Villans Wyk, Headley, Epsom.
- 1960: Sir Wilfred Douglas Vernon, of Anningley Park, Ottershaw
- 1961: Uvedale Henry Hoare Lambert of South Park, Blechingley
- 1962: Sydney Black of Wimbledon, London S.W.19.
- 1963: Sir (Robert) George Erskine of Busbridge Wood, Godalming
- 1964: Sir William John Herbert De Wette Mullens of Guildford.
- 1965: Lieut.-Colonel Herbert James Wells of Oakhurst Rise, Carshalton Beeches.
- 1966: Major Henry Dumas of Abbots Wood, Hurtmore, Godalming.
- 1967: Terence Robert Beaumont Sanders
- 1968: Jack Nelson Streynsham Hoskins, Sandhills, Witley.
- 1969:Brigadier David Terence Bastin of Polshot Farm, Elstead.
- 1970: Colonel Alan Randall Rees-Reynolds of Priors Gate, near Godalming
- 1971: Philip Sydney Henman, of Home Farm, Coldharbour Lane, Dorking
- 1972: Widdrington Richard Stafford of Cherrys High Drive, Woddingham
- 1973: Rear Admiral John Edwin Home McBeath of Woodbury House, Churt
- 1974: Major James Robert More-Molyneux, of Loseley Park, Guildford
- 1975: Winifred Mary Margueritta Du Buisson, of Pratsham Grange, Holmbury St. Mary
- 1976: Thomas Irvine Smith of Titlarks Hill Lodge, Sunningdale, Berkshire
- 1977: Commodore James Goddard Young of Haslemere.
- 1978: Richard Eustace Thornton, of Hampton, Scale, near Farnham.
- 1979: Michael John Calvert, of Ockley Court, Ockley, near Dorking.
- 1980: John Eveleigh Bolton of Brook Place, Woking.
- 1981: George William Semark Miskin, of Hankley Edge, Tilford, Farnham.
- 1982: John Patrick Michael Hugh Evelyn, of Kempslade Farm, Abinger Common, Dorking
- 1983: Sir Hugh Guy Cubitt, of Chapel House, West Humble, Dorking.
- 1984: Sir Richard Anthony Meyjes, of Longhill House, The Stands, near Farnham.
- 1985: John Flett Whitfield, of Priory Road, Sunningdale, Berkshire
- 1986: David James Keswick Coles, of Vigo House, Holmwood, Dorking.
- 1987: Alistair Jevon Johnston of Upper Jordan, Worplesdon.
- 1988: Major Wyndham Jermyn Hacket Pain, of Parkstone House, Ashwood Road, Woking.
- 1989: Sir Hugh Spender Lisle Dundas of Dockenfield, Farnham
- 1990: Dr. Anthony John Blowers of Boundstone, Farnham.
- 1991: James William Thomas Alexander Malcolm of Thatcher's Barn, Worpleston
- 1992: Gordon Ernest Lee-Steere, of Jayes Park, Ockley.
- 1993: Sir Peter Anson, 7th Baronet
- 1994: Timothy Francis Goad, of South Park, Bletchingley.
- 1995: Lady Hamilton of Dalzell of Betchworth House, Betchworth
- 1996: Adrian Nicholas MacDonald Sanders, of Underhill Farm, Buckland.
- 1997: James Douglas Moir Robertson, "Cobwebs", Sunbury-on-Thames.
- 1998: Richard Henry Simpson Stilgoe, Trevereux Manor, Limpsfield Chart, Oxted
- 1999: Peter Robert Nutting of North Breache Manor, Ewhurst

== 21st century ==
- 2000: Michael More-Molyneux of Loseley Park, Guildford
- 2001: William (Bill) Biddell of Puttenham
- 2002: Penelope Anne Constance Keith of Milford
- 2003: Andrew Wates of Beare Green
- 2004: Dr Grace Dowling of Guildford
- 2005: David Hypher of Wood Street Village
- 2006: Adrian Edwin White of Dorking
- 2007: Nicholas John Elliot Sealy of Chobham
- 2008: Sally Varah of Holmbury St Mary
- 2009: Lady (Elizabeth) Toulson of Wood Street Village
- 2010: Robert Harold Douglas of Walton on Thames
- 2011: Professor Michael Joy
- 2012: Karin M. Sehmer of Wormley
- 2013: Helen A. Bowcock of Haslemere
- 2014: Peter J G Lee of Godstone
- 2015: Elizabeth A S Kennedy of Cobham, Surrey
- 2016: Richard Whittington of Chobham, descendant of Dick Whittington
- 2017: Robert Stewart Napier of Baynards Manor, Rudgwick
- 2018: William James Glover of Westcott, Dorking
- 2019: Bridget Jane Biddell of Seale, Nr Farnham
- 2020: Shahid Azeem of Woking
- 2021: Dr Julie Llewelyn of Hambledon
- 2022: Christopher Allan Critchlow, of Guildford
- 2023: Timothy Andrew de Burgh Wates, of Ewhurst
- 2024: Shahid Azeem, of Woking
- 2025: Peter Charles Cluff, of Guildford
- 2026: Johanna Maria Hamilton, of Betchworth
