= Cornhill =

Cornhill can refer to:

- Cornhill, Aberdeen
- Cornhill, Aberdeenshire
- Cornhill, Boston, formerly a street in Boston
- Cornhill, London, a street and ward in the City of London
- Cornhill Magazine, literary publication in print until 1975
- Cornhill-on-Tweed, Northumberland
- Cornhill Insurance, a British insurance company
- Royal Cornhill Hospital, a psychiatric hospital in Aberdeen
- The Cornhill, Ipswich, a historic town square
- Cornhill, Utica, New York
- Gervase de Cornhill (died c. 1183), a medieval sheriff
- Henry de Cornhill (sheriff) (died c. 1193), a medieval sheriff
- Henry de Cornhill (priest), medieval Dean of St Paul's Cathedral
- HM Prison Shepton Mallet, sometimes known as Cornhill.

== See also ==
- Corn Hill (disambiguation)
- Kornhill
