= John Gainsford (died 1543) =

John Gainsford (died 1543) was an English landowner and courtier, active during the reigns of Henry VII and Henry VIII.

He was the son of John Gainsford (died 1491) and Anne Worsley. He inherited estates at Hampton Poyle and Crowhurst Place. Some stained glass with his heraldry survived in the hall at Crowhurst, with the feather device of the Prince of Wales.

Gainsford’s connections extended to the royal household through his great uncle, Nicholas Gaynesford, who served as an usher to Elizabeth of York.

Gainsford was Sheriff of Surrey in 1500 and 1517, a role that placed him among the county’s leading figures.

He died in 1543 and was buried at Guildford, Surrey, where his family’s presence had long been established.

== Marriages and children ==
Gainsford married six times and had over twenty children. His wives were:

- Katherine Covert
- Anne Haut or Hawte, mother of Anne Gainsford who served Anne Boleyn
- Anne Fiennes
- Johanna Poliver
- Etheldreda or Audrey Shaw
- Grace Warham
