= East Lavington =

Village and parish in West Sussex, England

Coordinates: 50.93806°N 0.65468°W

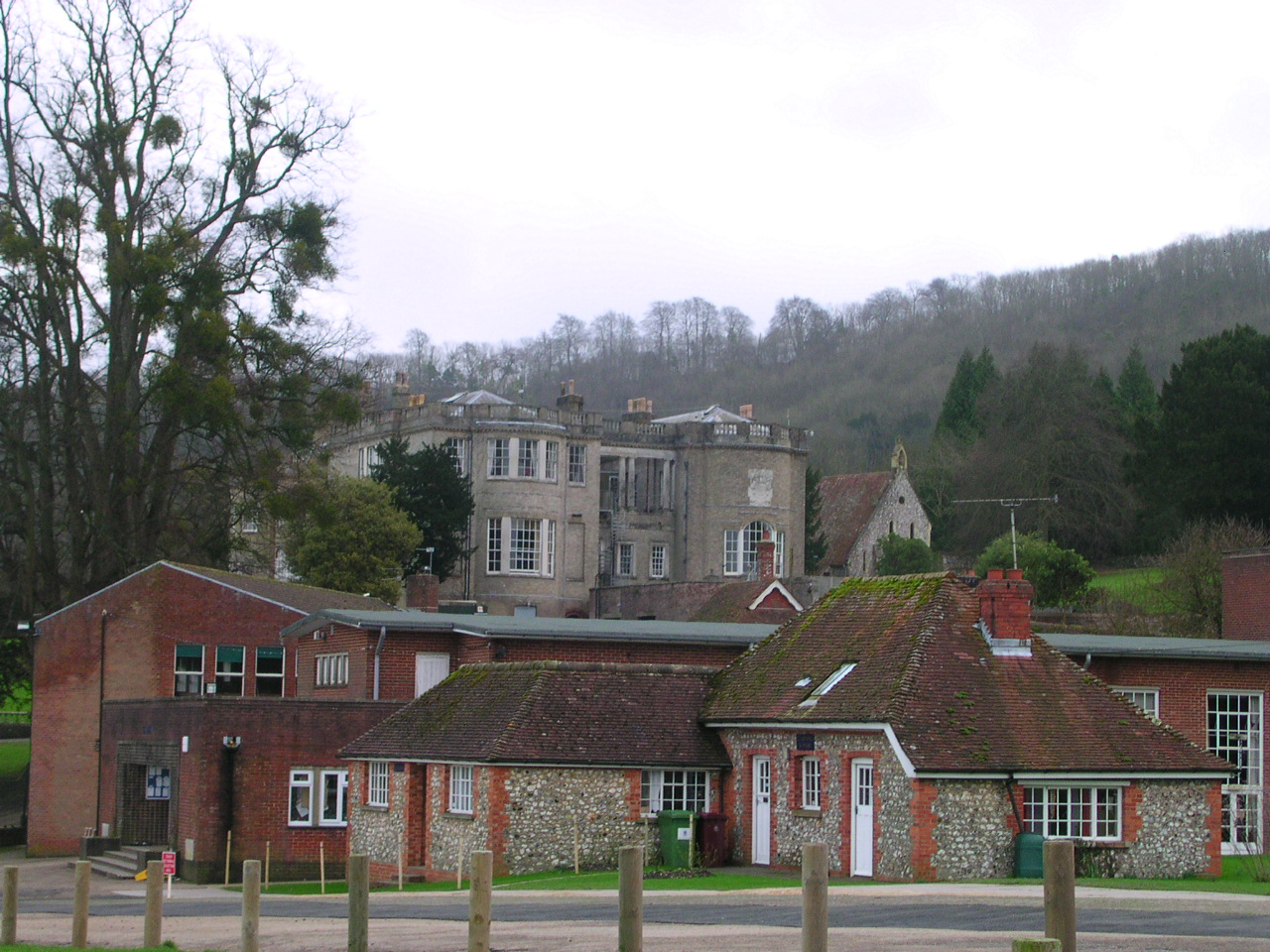
- East Lavington House (left) and St. Peter’s Church (right), in the parish of Graffham with Woolavingtion

- Location within West Sussex
- Area: 7.97 km^{2} (3.08 sq mi)
- Population: 273. 2011 Census
  - Density: 45/km^{2} (120/sq mi)
- OS grid reference: SU946162
  - London: 45 miles (72 km) *NNE
- Civil parish: East Lavington
- District: Chichester
- Shire county: West Sussex
- Region: South East
- Country: England
- Sovereign state: United Kingdom
- Post town: PETWORTH
- Postcode district: GU28
- Dialling code: 01798
- Police: Sussex
- Fire: West Sussex
- Ambulance: South East Coast
- UK Parliament: Chichester
- Website: http://www.eastlavingtonpc.org.uk/

East Lavington, formerly Woolavington, is a village and civil parish in the District of Chichester in West Sussex, England. It is located six kilometres (4 miles) south of Petworth, west of the A285 road.

West Lavington was formerly an exclave of Woolavington.

The parish has a land area of 797 hectares (1968 acres). In the 2001 census 357 people lived in 87 households, of whom 129 were economically active. It includes the settlement of Upper Norwood.

The parish is dominated by Seaford College, a private school which owns 400 acres (1.6 km^{2}). The main school building, previously Lavington Park country house, is a Grade II* listed building. St Peter's parish church, also Grade II* listed, has become the school chapel.

In July 1553, John Fowler, a courtier of Edward VI, was made Keeper of the Great Park of Petworth or "Woolavington" in Sussex. Mary I appointed another courtier, William Goring, as keeper. An Elizabethan manor house was built by Giles Garton, at "Woolavington" in 1587. The old house at Lavington Park is long demolished, but the 1587 building contract described how the chimneys, windows, and corner quoins should be made "verie artyficiallie and conninglie".

== Notable people ==
Samuel Wilberforce is buried at East Lavington.
