= Sir William Whorne =

Fifteenth century knighted Lord Mayor of London

Sir William Whorne was Lord Mayor of London in 1487. He is sometimes also reported as William Horne or William Littlebury.

Whorne was Lord Mayor at the time of the coronation of Elizabeth of York as the queen of King Henry VII of England, and was knighted in the course of the preparations. He rode ahead of the queen's litter, in company with the two Esquires of Honour, Verney and Nicholas Gaynesford, in her procession from the Tower of London to Westminster.

He erected a house, Whorne's Place, on the north bank of the River Medway at Cuxton, Kent, between Halling and Strood. In Tudor times this was the principal house in the village, but only an outlying granary survived in 1971.
