= John FitzHugh =

Sites significant to John FitzHugh
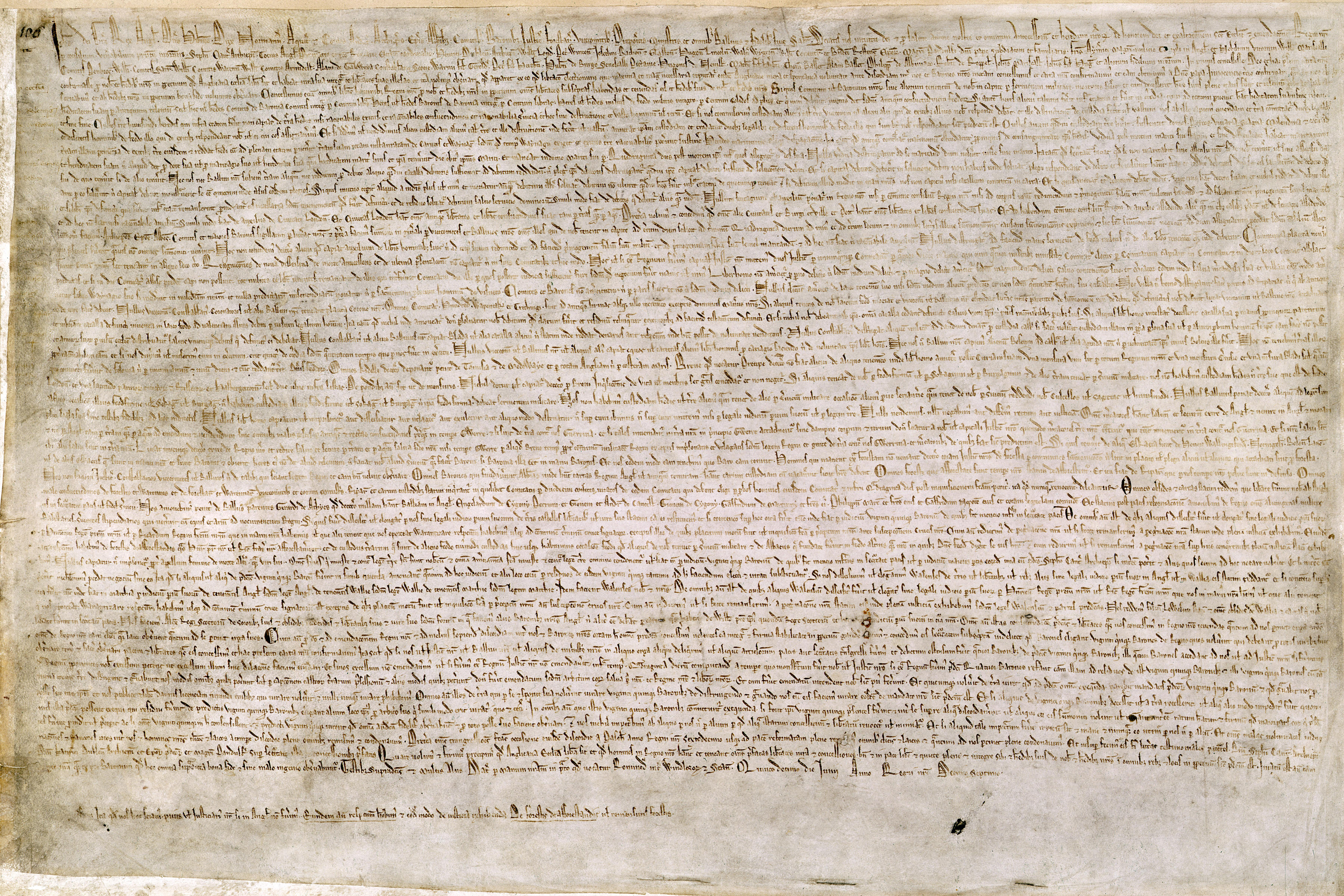
FitzHugh's name (as Johīs fil Huḡ) on the British Library Cotton MS of Magna Carta.

John FitzHugh (Latin: Johannes filius Hugonis; c. 1180–1220) was an Anglo-Norman royal counsellor to King John of England.

FitzHugh was claimed to be part of a family called the Fitzhughs of Ravensworth, based in northern Yorkshire, but it is more likely that his name is merely a patronymic and he was of relatively lowly birth.

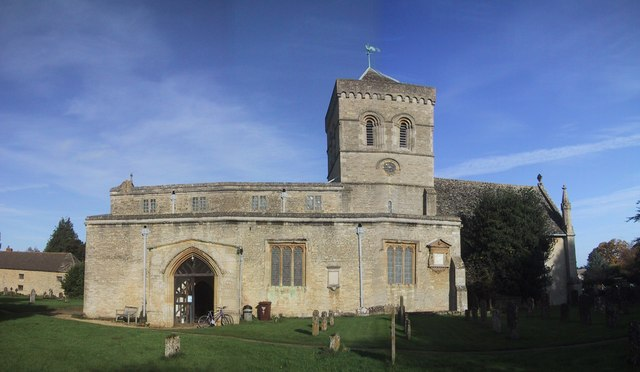
Medieval church of St Mary the Virgin, Kirtlington

FitzHugh appears on the Pipe Rolls for 1176, ad parandas domos ("for preparing buildings"); in other years he oversaw repair of castles, including Odiham Castle, Hampshire. He collected taxes, such as scutage and tithes, and in 1212 was recorded as making payments to the keeper of lions at the Tower of London. In 1204 he was granted land at Kirtlington, Oxfordshire.

FitzHugh was Sheriff of Surrey from 1207 to 1213, and in 1213 was sent as an envoy to the County of Flanders. He also had charge of the confiscated estates of the dioceses of Canterbury and Salisbury when England was under an interdict, and FitzHugh is also recorded as handling large sums of state funds. He was Constable and Governor of Windsor Castle in 1201–04 and again in 1205–16.

FitzHugh is notable as one of 27 ecclesiastical and secular magnates who had counselled John to accept the terms of Magna Carta in 1215 and is named in the preamble to the document.

He joined the rebellious barons in the First Barons' War (1216) and as a result lost control of Hertford Castle and Kirtlington. John died in 1216 and FitzHugh returned to the royal side after the Battle of Lincoln (1217).

John FitzHugh married Gunnora de Bendinges; they had a daughter, Juliana, who married Adam FitzHervey. FitzHugh died in 1220 during the Fifth Crusade; after his death, his marriage to Gunnora was disputed as invalid.
