= William Weston II =

Member of the Parliament of England

William Weston II (died c. 1419) was an English Member of Parliament.

He was elected the Member of Parliament for Sussex in 1415. He was appointed Sheriff of Surrey and Sussex for 1417.

He married Joan, the daughter of Thomas Wintershall of Bramley, Surrey and had one son.
