= Corn Hill =

Corn Hill may refer to:

- Corn Hill, Longford, Leinster, Ireland
- Corn Hill, New Brunswick, Canada
- Corn Hill, Rochester, New York, United States

== See also ==
- Cornhill (disambiguation)
