= Reginald de Cornhill =

12th-century Anglo-Norman nobleman and royal official

Reginald de Cornhill (occasionally Reynold de Cornhill) was an English administrator under King John.

Reginald de Cornhill's father, Gervase, had also been High Sheriff of Kent in 1170–1174, and his brother Henry de Cornhill sheriff of London. He became the King's Justiciar, High Sheriff of Kent from 1189 to 1193 and 1196 to 1215 and High Sheriff of Surrey from 1213 to 1215. In 1215, he was sent to Lancaster to also take over as High Sheriff of Lancaster following the revolt of Gilbert Fitzreinfrid.

Cornhill was in charge of collecting the tax of a fifteenth on merchants' imports and exports from 1202 to 1204, when he, along with his fellow keepers William of Wrotham and William of Furnell, accounted for the revenues on the Pipe roll of 1204. In May 1205 Cornhill, along with Willam of Wrotham, was given custody of one of three dies for the mint at Chichester, but in July the king gave Cornhill's custody to Simon of Wells, the Bishop of Chichester.

Cornhill was constable of Rochester Castle in 1215 on behalf of its then holder Stephen Langton, archbishop of Canterbury. He opened its gates to William d'Aubigny and his troops, whom the barons rebelling against King John had sent to the castle to hold it against the King. He held out against the King's two-month siege. In 1216, he was appointed Keeper of the King's Ports and Galleys.

Through his wife, Maud, Cornhill had a claim to the stewardship of St Augustine's Abbey, Canterbury, which he and his wife quitclaimed for 80 marks and 50 acres (200,000 m^{2}) in land by fine in 1197. In 1203 the prior and convent of Prittlewell Priory, in return for a quitclaim of a moiety of the advowson of the church of North Shoebury, granted to Reginald and his heirs the perpetual right to present one clerk to be a monk in their house.
