= Nicholas Gaynesford =

Nicholas Gainsford, also written Gaynesford or Gaynesforde, (about 1427–1498) of Carshalton, Surrey, of an armigerous gentry family established at Crowhurst, was a Justice of the Peace, several times Member of Parliament and High Sheriff of Surrey and Sussex, Constable and Keeper of Odiham Castle and Park, Hampshire, who served in the royal households from around 1461 until his death in 1498. Rising to high office during the reign of Henry VI, he was an Usher to the Chamber of Edward IV and, by 1476, to his queen Elizabeth Woodville. Closely within the sphere of Woodville patronage, he was a favourer of Edward V, and was a leader in the Kentish rising of 1483 against Richard III. He was attainted in 1483, but was soon afterwards pardoned, and fully regained his position and estate as Esquire to Henry VII and Elizabeth of York after the Battle of Bosworth Field. He established the Carshalton branch of the Gainsford family.

== The Gainsfords of Crowhurst ==
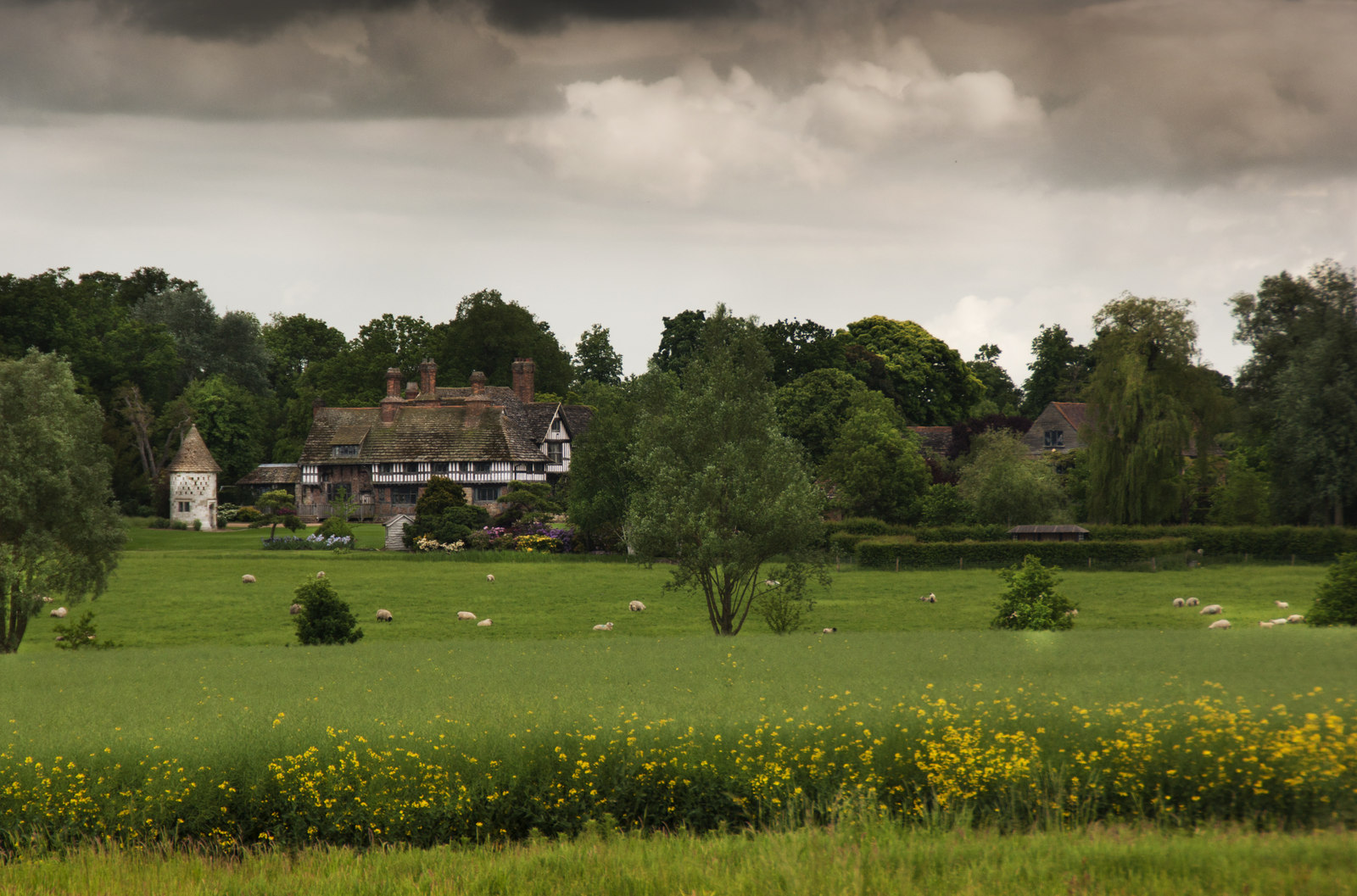
Crowhurst Place, now greatly modified, 15th-century seat of the Gainsford family.

Through several generations the senior Gainsford heir was named John, each becoming John 'senior' (the elder) in turn. The Gainsford family acquired manorial estates at Crowhurst, Surrey, during the 1330s, and in 1338 obtained licence to hold divine service in their oratory there. They held the manor of Chellows by 1359. The moated site of Crowhurst Place was purchased in 1418, and the hall was rebuilt later in the 15th century. A further estate, 'At Grove', was assimilated in 1434.

During the later 14th century the marriage of John Gainsford to Margery, daughter of Sir John and Mabel de la Poyle, led to a great extension of the Gainsford estates. Sir John's grandson John de la Poyle (died 1424), having only an infant grandson as heir, before dying enfeoffed various kinsmen including a younger John Gainsford with his valuable manors and appurtenances of Hampton Poyle in Oxfordshire, Poyle at Tongham near Guildford in Surrey, Poyle in Middlesex, and several other manors. The infant's mother Elizabeth Warner, meanwhile, remarried to Walter Green, M.P., of Middlesex, who already had children (including daughters Joan, wife of Miles Windsor of Stanwell, and Katherine). Her father Robert Warner was among Poyle's feoffees who in 1438 granted the right in remainder of these manors to John Gainsford and his son John. Hampton Poyle was transferred fully by the father to the younger John Gainsford and wife Katherine in 1447.

== Family and early career ==
John Gainsford 'senior' made his will in 1448 and died in 1450. He had then three sons, John, William and Nicholas. The eldest, John (1419–1460), of Crowhurst and Hampton Poyle, married first Anna (daughter of Richard Wakehurst of Ardingly), mother of John Gainsford (died 1491) the senior Gainsford heir. His second wife (by 1447) was Katherine (daughter of Walter Green, and widow and executrix of William Stalworth) by whom he had two daughters and two sons, one of whom, George Gainsford, eventually inherited Hampton Poyle.

The second son, William (born c. 1421), is associated with the parish of Lingfield, near Crowhurst. Sir Reginald Cobham of Sterborough, 3rd Baron Cobham, founder of the collegiate church of St. Peter at Lingfield, appointed Sir William Gainsford, knight (possibly uncle of this William), an executor of his will of 1446; his widow Dame Anne enfeoffed John Gainsford the elder and William, with Richard Wakehurst, in 1447–8, but only John and Richard in 1453. In 1453 Joan (daughter of John Symond of Toppesfield (Essex) and Margaret Gobion), wife of William Gainsford, was buried at Lingfield. William (presumably the brother of Nicholas) was M.P. for Surrey in 1449–1450. One William is concerned in the manor of Chevening in the late 1440s, and one in 1463 in the manor of Westerham, both in Kent. One is 'deceased' in 1466. Richard, son of William, was holding the manor of Blockfield at Lingfield (near Crowhurst) in 1477; Richard's brother and heir John was only 24 – too young to be Joan's son – when inheriting tenure of the Gobion manors in 1484.

There were also sisters, possibly Emma and Matilda, whose children received the first legacies in John Gainsford's will, and also Agnes Gainsford, a wife of Sir John Culpeper of Bedgebury in Goudhurst, Kent. By 1448 their mother was already dead, and Nicholas, although named an executor, in 1450 reserved his powers at probate. His father's high tomb was raised on the north side of the chancel of Crowhurst church with a brass figure in armour, inscription and shields including the arms of Gainsford impaling Poyle set into the upper slab.

Nicholas, born about 1427, was appointed Controller of petty customs in the Port of London in October 1449, and in 1452–53 he and his brother John were admitted to Lincoln's Inn, 'for services of their family to the profession', their uncle William Gainsford being then its Governor. In that year Nicholas was returned to Parliament for Bletchingley (Surrey) while his brother John was Knight of the Shire, in which Nicholas followed him in 1455–56. At about that time Nicholas married Margaret Sidney (possibly daughter of William Sidney of Cranley, armiger, who died in 1449). Soon afterwards he acquired the manor of Burghersh alias Stone Court, Carshalton, formerly in the hands of the Green family, and settled there. In November 1457 he was appointed Escheator for Surrey and Sussex, and in November 1460 to his first term as High Sheriff for those counties, and concurrently Knight of the Shire. Following the formal accession of Edward IV the following March he, with Sir Thomas Cobham, at once received a Commission to imprison Nicholas Carew (formerly Escheator) and others.

== Edward IV: Yorkist ascendancy ==
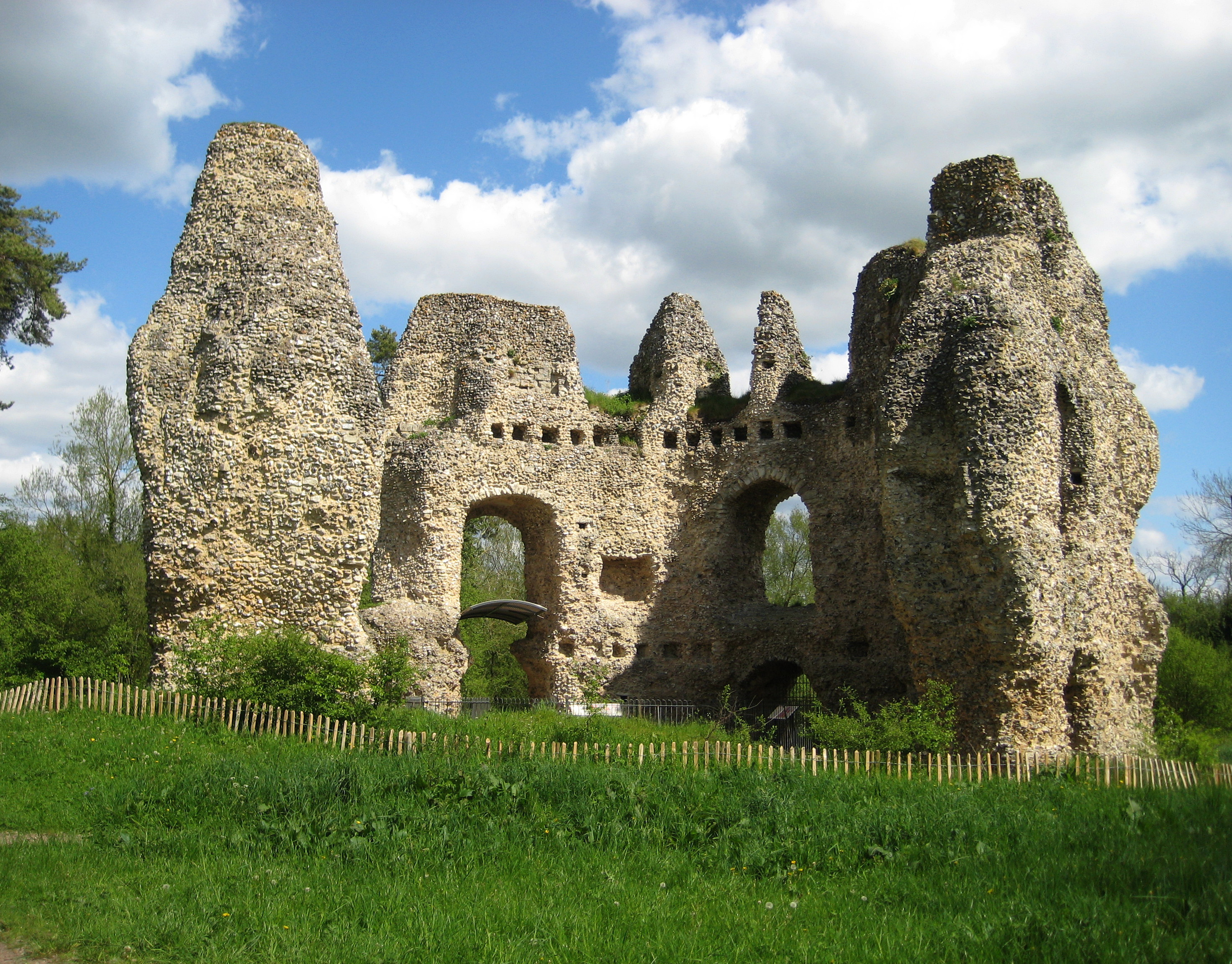
The ruins of Odiham Castle

John Gainsford, Nicholas's elder brother, made his will in late May 1460, appointing his wife Katherine, his two brothers and John Elmbridge (of Merstham) his executors, leaving Crowhurst to his son John, and died soon afterwards. Katherine at once (by 1461) remarried to Sir Edmund Rede of Boarstall (1417–1489). In 1462, following the accession of Edward IV, the Barony of Hastings (into which the fee including Crowhurst and Carshalton alias Burghersh was confirmed) was granted to William Hastings.

Nicholas served on Commissions of the Peace for Surrey from the start of Edward's reign. He was appointed King's Servitor and an Usher of the King's Chamber in 1461, receiving a life grant to be constable and porter of the King's hunting residence at Odiham Castle, North Warnborough, Hampshire, and in 1464, as King's Esquire, was also made keeper of the Park itself. (The Keeper's hunting-lodge at Odiham survives.) A year later the King had a tun of wine laid in at 'our trusty and well beloved servant's Nicholas Gaynesford's house' for them to enjoy when hunting the hare. In 1462 he also received the manor of Shalford-Clifford (near Guildford), and estates in the Isle of Axholme, formerly of John Lord Clifford and John Pennicock (both attainted), grants further confirmed in 1466.

The probate of John's will was perhaps delayed by an unfolding family drama. Richard Wakehurst and his son Richard, the last male Wakehurst heir, had both died in 1454, leaving the younger Richard's two daughters as heiresses in the care of John and Agnes (Gainsford) Culpeper. John Gainsford entrusted the deeds of their inheritance to his mother-in-law Elizabeth (Etchingham) Wakehurst, widow of the elder Richard. Before John Gainsford's death the two Wakehurst heiresses were abducted and married by Culpeper's two brothers, with the complicity of their sister Margaret (Culpeper), wife of Alexander Clifford of Bobbing, Kent. Elizabeth Wakehurst withheld the inheritance, and lawsuits arose. One of the marriages proved highly successful. Richard Wakehurst had granted the manor of Bysshe Court at Horne to his younger son John, who died having enfeoffed William Gainsford with it in 1452. William granted it to Nicholas in 1464: more than twenty years later the widow of John Wakehurst accused Nicholas Gainsford of having contrived to exclude her from her right in Bysshe Court.

John Gainsford's probate was concluded in 1464: his high tomb stands on the south side of Crowhurst chancel, opposite his father's, also with armoured brass figure, shields and inscription. In 1466 William and Nicholas Gainsford and other feoffees obtained licence to grant the manor of Poyle at Guildford, held in chief, to their brother John's son John. This heir had recently married Anne, daughter of Otwell Worsley, and soon afterwards granted the manor to his father-in-law as a settlement during his wife's lifetime, securing the reversion to himself and his own heirs. Nicholas was again High Sheriff in 1468–69.

Wardship of Robert White

In 1469 Nicholas sold his Axholme lands to the Priory of Axholme, and in December 1469 he and Thomas St. Leger, Esquire of the Body, were granted custody of the lands and marriage of Robert White (aged 14), son and heir of John White of South Warnborough (near Odiham), Hampshire (died 1469). Robert's grandfather, a wealthy Merchant of the Staple of Calais, had acquired the manor of South Warnborough in 1440, and had purchased certain Hampshire manors from Margaret Hungerford, Lady Bottreux between about 1462 and 1467 (when he died). Nicholas Gainsford had now four sons and four daughters, one of whom, Margaret, was soon married to Robert White. Some uncertainty surrounds the claim that John White's wife Eleanor, mother of the young Robert, was an otherwise unrecorded daughter of Robert Hungerford.

Nicholas was once again High Sheriff of Surrey and Sussex in 1472–73, when he held a commission of array, and was serving as M.P. for Guildford (1472–75) in company with Sir George Browne. During this period suits concerning the Bottreux manors ensued between Robert's mother Eleanor (then wife of Sir Harry Fitz Lowys), his brother Richard, their uncle Sir John Young (Lord Mayor of London 1466–67, sometime husband of John White's sister Agnes), and Richard Newbridge, vicar of Farnham and surviving executor of Robert the grandfather. Robert White was granted licence to enter his lordships and hereditaments in 1481.

=== Service to Elizabeth Woodville ===
The grant of constable and porter, keeper and warrener at Odiham was renewed in 1476 by Elizabeth Woodville, Edward's queen, to Nicholas as the queen's servant and Usher to her Chamber, and to William Clifford, the king's servant. Thenceforth Nicholas was in the queen's service, and Margaret his wife was one of her Gentlewomen. Woodville patronage shaped their fortunes. In 1478, when he was M.P. for Southwark, he joined with Thomas Bourchier, Thomas St Leger, George Browne and others in the Commissions of Escheat upon the possessions of the Duke of Clarence in Surrey. At various times in Edward's later years he served in the Thames commissions, and had a commission of array in 1480.

By about 1475 John, eldest son of Nicholas and Margaret, married Joan, daughter and heir of Reginald Moresby of Allington, Kent, and they had children Robert and Margaret. The second son Walter became chaplain at Carshalton, where John Leek was vicar. Of the daughters, in addition to Margaret White, Elizabeth married Thomas Ellingbridge (died 1497), Gentleman-usher to Cardinal Morton, and son of John Ellingbridge of Merstham.

== Richard III: Buckingham's Rebellion ==
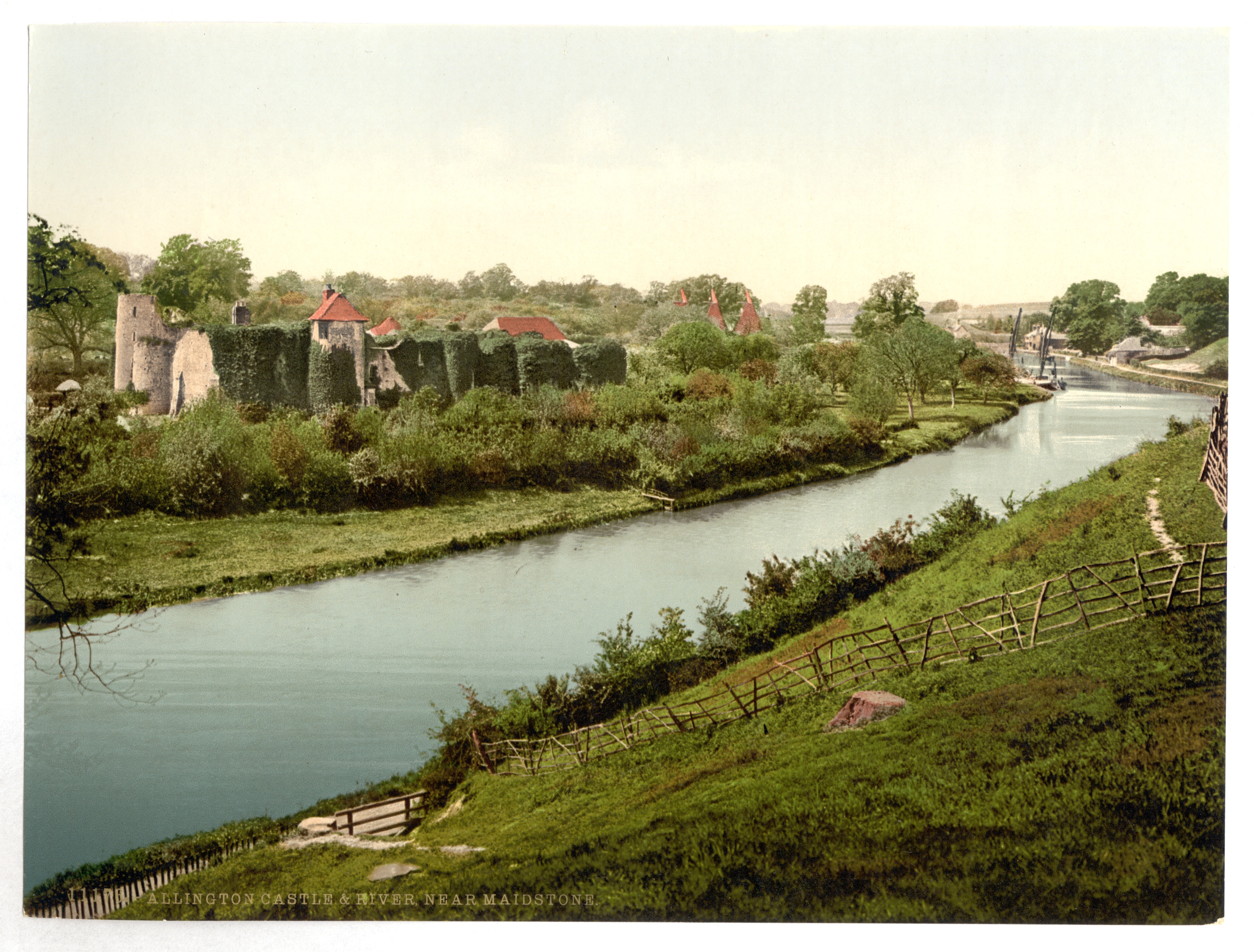
Allington Castle before redevelopment.

Gainsford attended the coronation of Richard III, whose bloody path to the throne drove Nicholas, King Edward's loyal courtier and close Woodville associate, and his son John into the resistance against him. With Sir George Browne, Sir John Fogge, Sir Thomas St Leger and Sir Thomas Lewknor, and with his son John Gainsford, he was among the leaders of the premature Kentish rising around Maidstone in October 1483 intended to coincide with the general rising led by the Duke of Buckingham. In the aftermath of its failure Nicholas Gainsford of Carshalton and John Gainsford of Allington were named in a Proclamation of outlawry for the arrest of the leaders, and in a general act of attainder, and were deprived of their lands and offices. The Close Rolls show that in May 1484 John and Nicholas were placed under a recognizance of 100 marks. Richard pardoned them in July 1484, and although excluded from Kent at the King's pleasure, they were to receive the rents of the lordship of Allington (a Moresby hereditament) from the receiver John Moyle from April 1485.

== Henry VII: reinstatement ==
Gainsford was fully rehabilitated at the accession of Henry VII. By a general act of restitution the attainder was reversed. In September 1485 he was re-appointed High Sheriff of Surrey and Sussex: at much the same time he was granted custody for 7 years of the manor, lordship and hundred of Odiham, and also the manors of Banstead and Walton in Surrey with the park and warren, and lands in Charlwood. The stewardship of the manor, constable and porter, park and warren of Odiham were re-granted to Nicholas and John together. John however died in 1486, leaving his son Robert, aged 10, as his heir, and Joan Gainsford entrusted title to his many hereditaments to Nicholas Gainsford and William Covert the elder. Having remarried, she died in 1492 and was buried at Carshalton. This grant was confirmed to Nicholas in March 1493, with the wardship and marriage of Robert, for whom Margaret, daughter of John Moyle, was selected as the suitable wife.

Gainsford is described as 'Usher of the Chamber of the King's consort queen Elizabeth' by the grant of a life annuity of £20 from the issues of Kent, in June 1486. In the King's third year, at the coronation of Queen Elizabeth, Margaret Gainsford was present as one of the queen's Gentlewomen. Nicholas Gainsford was (with one Verney) one of the two Esquires of Honour who rode with the Lord Mayor (Sir William Horne) ahead of the queen's litter as she was borne from the Tower of London in procession through the City of London to Westminster. Nicholas and Margaret remained in the service of the queen.

Nicholas received Commission of the peace for Surrey annually from 1487 to 1494 and (thrice) in 1497, of gaol delivery in 1486 and 1489, of oyer and terminer in 1487 and 1493 and of array in 1488 and 1491. In 1491–92 he was again Knight of the Shire, and may have represented Southwark in Parliament in the years preceding. It was perhaps through this connection that his granddaughter Margaret White married (as his first wife) John Kirton of Edmonton (died 1529), M.P. for Southwark in 1491–92. In his last years the deaths of his son Walter (1493), daughter Elizabeth and son-in-law Thomas Ellingbridge (1497) occurred in swift succession.

== Death and legacy ==
Nicholas made his will as of Carshalton on 27 July 1497, making Robert Gainsford his principal heir. He made special charitable gifts to the 'Abbey of Martin', presumably Battle Abbey, (for the sake of the soul of his former servant John Miles), continuing his annual donations, and beseeching the prior to be as good a friend to his soul as he had been in time past to his person. The will was proved by the oath of his wife on 4 November 1498. His three other executors, who reserved their powers, were John Legh of Adlington, John Kirton, and William Buck. Buck was Master of the Fraternity of Taylors and Linen Armourers of St. John the Baptist (forerunner of the Merchant Taylors) in 1488–89 and was the first husband of Kirton's sister Margaret (died 1522), who (after Buck's death in 1502) married Sir Stephen Jenyns (Master of that Guild in 1490). Confusions have arisen because both Nicholas Gainsford and his wife in their wills refer to their grandchildren as 'son' or 'daughter' and to others (variously) as 'cosyn'. Margaret Gaynsford died in 1503.

=== Heraldry ===
The arms for Gainsford of Carshalton are given as: Argent, a chevron gules between three greyhounds courant sable collared or. Crest: A demi maiden couped below the waist, habited gules crined or, holding in the dexter hand a wreath vert, and in the sinister a rose branch proper.

"And I do ordaine my good maister Sir John Risseley to be the Overseer of the same," Nicholas Gainsford wrote at the end of his will, "to whom I bequeath my brace of Gray howndis and my Crosbowe with all things thereto belongyng, And I beseche hym to accepte this lytell gyfte, for if I hade eny other thinge of pleasure I mowte thynke hit full well to be bestowid uppon hym."

=== Grave memorial ===
The tomb memorial to Nicholas and Margaret Gainsford was recorded by Daniel Lysons, and showed them with four sons and four daughters, all looking towards a Trinity in the upper right hand corner. The inscription, in which the dates of death were never inserted, referred to their service to the queens of Edward IV and Henry VII. The Gainsfords were part of a kinship network favouring brass memorials throughout the 15th century. A brass to Robert White at South Warnborough showed him in armour kneeling in prayer much like his father-in-law: the heraldic shields are lost, which might have indicated his Hungerford parentage. Robert died in August 1512.

=== Literary environment ===
Surviving manuscripts and other references suggest the literary interests of the Gainsford family during the later 15th and 16th centuries. The Huntington Library MS EL 26.A 13 (Thomas Hoccleve's Regiment of Princes with lines from Geoffrey Chaucer and John Lydgate, in part written by John Shirley), inscribed by Nicholas Gainsford, and the British Library MS Royal 18.B.iii, a text of the prose Chronicle of Brut, with inscriptions (fol. 36r) naming Erasmus Gainsford (1536–1581) and others, probably refer to the Crowhurst son and grandson of Sir John Gainsford of Guildford and his wife Agnes or Anne Worsley. Copies of John Hardyng's Chronicle and Le Receuil des Histoires de Troie which William Gainsford inherited from the Redes of Boarstall can similarly be referred to the descendants of John Gainsford of Crowhurst (died 1460), whose second wife Katherine (Green) remarried to Sir Edmund Rede (see above).

John Gainsford (1467–1540), the son of John Gainsford and Anne Worsley of Crowhurst, married six times. By his second wife Anne Haute he was father of Anne Gainsford (wife of Sir George Zouche of Codnor), whose interest in William Tyndale's The Obedience of a Christian Man brought the work to the attention of King Henry VIII. Anne was the sister of Mary Gainsford, successively wife of Sir William Courtenay (died 1535), Forester of Petherton Park, and of Sir Anthony Kingston (died 1556), active in the conspiracy of Henry Dudley.

Nicholas Gainsford in his will required that the vicar of Carshalton 'restore all suche bookes as he hath in kepyng of the said Water' (i.e. which belonged to his son Walter); in 1503 Margaret Gainsford bequeathed to her daughter Margaret, wife of Robert White, 'my prymar with silver clasps'. These may have been religious books. The early (c.1400) recension of Chaucer's translation of Boethius's De Consolatione Philosophiae in British Library Additional MS 10340 (which forms the basis of a published edition) was in the hands of Stephen Kirton, London alderman and Merchant-taylor, son of John Kirton (executor to both Nicholas and Margaret Gainsford) and his wife Margaret White, daughter of the above.

Many ancient documents relating to the Gainsfords of Crowhurst are collected in the Gaynesford Cartulary, an accumulation originally formed by the family themselves.

=== Children ===
Of the various 'sons' and 'daughters' named in the Gainsfords' wills, these are certainly children rather than grandchildren:

- John Gainsford, died 1486, married Joan, daughter and heir of Reginald Moresby of Allington, Kent. Joan died in 1492. They had two children.
- Walter Gainsford, chaplain of Carshalton (unmarried), died 1493. (no issue)
- (2 sons, names unknown)
- Margaret Gainsford, married Robert White of South Warnborough, who died in 1512 or 1513: they had six children.
- Elizabeth Gainsford (died before 1497), married Thomas Ellingbridge (died 1497): they had seven children.
- (2 daughters, names unknown)
