= Stephen Jenyns =

Lord Mayor of London (c. 1450–1523)

Sir Stephen Jenyns
- Born: c. 1450
- Died: 1523
- Title: Lord Mayor of London
- Spouse: Unnamed (app. m. 1490 - d. before 1502) Margaret Buck
- Children: 2
- Parents: William Jenyns (father); Ellen (mother)

Sir Stephen Jenyns (c. 1450–1523) was a wool merchant from Wolverhampton, Merchant of the Staple and Master Merchant Taylor who became Lord Mayor of London for the year of the coronation of King Henry VIII. An artistic, architectural and educational patron, he founded Wolverhampton Grammar School, and took a leading part in the rebuilding of the church of St. Andrew Undershaft in the City of London.

== Origins and early life ==
Stephen Jenyns was, according to the Heraldic Visitations of Staffordshire (1614, 1663 and 1664), the son of William Jenyns of Tenby, Pembrokeshire, and his wife Ellen, daughter and coheir of William Lane of Wolverhampton. He was born at Wolverhampton shortly before 1450, and was apprenticed to a London tailor in 1462–63. He settled in London and became a prominent member of the Fraternity of Taylors and Linen Armourers of St. John the Baptist. In 1485 he and two others supported Hugh Pemberton, a senior Taylor, in a bond for payment of £920 for Pemberton's action in the probate of Richard Nayler, Alderman and Taylor, who died in 1483. In 1490–95 he was concerned in the purchase of lands in Westminster with Thomas Randyll (Taylor), Henry Castell (Dyer) and Sir Richard Guildford.

== Guildsman, Alderman and Sheriff ==
In an age of Guild reform, William Buck became Master of the Fraternity of Taylors in 1488–89 and commenced the Treasury Accounts Book for payments and receipts. Jenyns succeeded him as Master and made further reforms. He set aside an old ordinance relating to election of Masters, and decreed that the Wardens in post at any time should have precedence, after the Masters, at all assemblies. At the end of his term he and his successors enacted that various allowances (for fees and expenditures) customarily made to the Master should be discontinued: Jenyns repaid nearly £22 by way of example, including a contribution towards rebuilding a property belonging to the Guild near St Matthew Friday Street. Annual pensions paid to the former Masters and their wives, and fees to the Wardens, were also curtailed.

After the death of John Swan, a former Master, his widow Dame Rose Swan paid £149 6s. 8d. to the Company in 1493 for an Obit for her husband, in the presence of Buck, Jenyns and others. At her death in 1497/8 Jenyns was first-named of the three executors of her richly charitable testament, which they swore to administer. In 1498 Jenyns was elected Sheriff of London, in company with Thomas Bradbury, in the mayoralty of another elder of the company, Sir John Percyvale, who set the example of the foundation of Macclesfield Grammar School. (He was the first Master of the Taylors to become Mayor.) For Jenyns (for use in his 'Shrefewyk', or shrievalty) the Fraternity drew from their treasury twelve beautifully crafted spoons, and six silver bowls given by Rose Swan, with a gift of £26 13s. 4d. Jenyns became Alderman for Castle Baynard in 1499 and occupied that ward until 1505.

== Two marriages ==
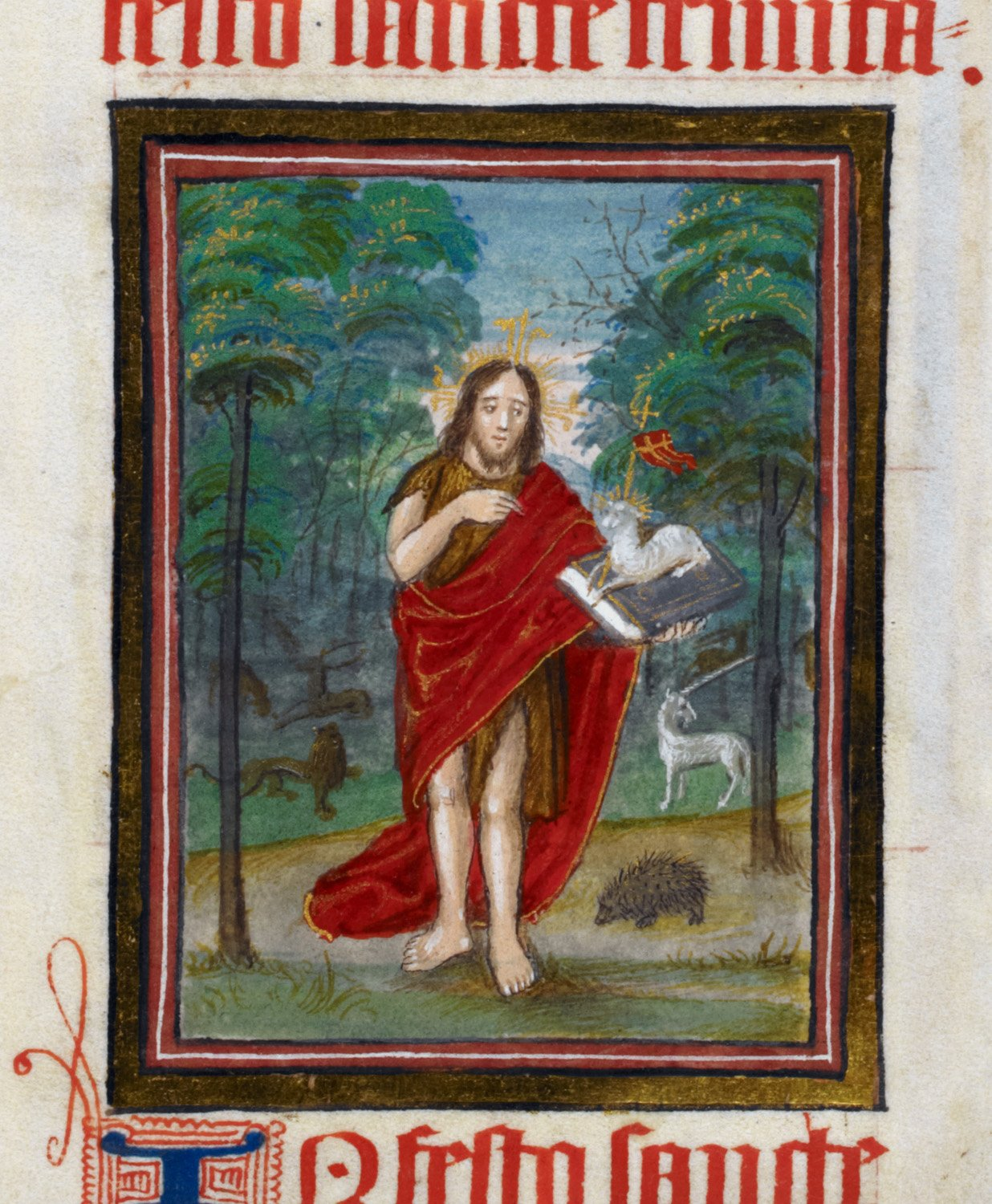
Miniature of St. John the Baptist (Patron of the Merchant Taylors) in the wilderness: Jenyns Lectionary, fol. 27.

During this time, probably after 1490, Jenyns was married, 'the wif of Stephyn Jenens taillour' receiving £4 and a black gown in Rose Swan's will written in 1496. By this marriage he had two daughters, Katherine and Elizabeth, whose mother died before 1502. In 1501 (28 March) William Buck died, and was buried at St. Mary Aldermanbury. For his executors Buck appointed his wife Margaret, John Kirton of London, and William Milbourne, Chamberlain of London 1492–1506. In the Hilary term of 1501/2 the executors acted together to recover sums owing to Buck's estate, by which time Margaret Buck had become the wife of Stephen Jenyns, who acted with them.

The Company already owned three hangings of Arras tapestry depicting scenes from the life of St. John the Baptist, to be hung on the walls of their Hall. Buck bequeathed to them three more, for the north wall (valued at £120), 'which I have bespoken to be made in Brucellys'. In January 1502/3 Henry VII incorporated the Fraternity under the new name of 'The Guild of Merchant Taylors of the Fraternity of St. John the Baptist': this was advocated and procured by William FitzWilliam, Master of the Taylors in 1499–1500. Stephen Jenyns gave a further three tapestries, completing the series of nine, to hang at the dais for the High Table and seats of honour in the Hall. Margaret Jenyns, 'for the good zeal that she had for the Company', presented a blue velvet embroidered altar-cloth of St John with a white rose above his head, and with green velvet edges worked with gold fleurs-de-lys and mottos, for their Chapel. All were recorded in an Inventory of 1512.

Margaret Buck (née Kirton) was the sister of John Kirton, originally of St. Paul's Cray, Kent, a trusted lawyer of Gray's Inn and J.P., and (in the footsteps of his father William) M.P. for Southwark in 1491–92. There was also a sister Beatrix, married to the lawyer Henry Tyngledon. Their mother was Margery Milbourne, and John had married Margaret White, granddaughter of Nicholas Gaynesford of Carshalton. In 1498 Kirton and Buck were named executors in Gaynesford's will, and John acted in 1503 for Gaynesford's widow. By his second marriage Stephen Jenyns became stepfather to the four sons and one daughter of William Buck and uncle to John Kirton's five children. Both Jenyns and his maternal aunt, the Lane heiress Isabel Swerder, were godparents at baptism to John's son Stephen Kirton.

Jenyns received £100 from the Privy Purse 'for plegging of sertain of the Quenes juells' in 1503, possibly to settle a loan unpaid at her death. In 1505, as alderman, he transferred to the Dowgate ward (until 1508), and from 1505 to 1507 he was Auditor to the Court of Aldermen. The appointment of John Kirton as Clerk of the Treasury ('clerk of Hell') in 1506 was obtained by royal writ, and was said (by his discharged predecessor) to have been purchased from the king for 300 marks by the management of Stephen Jenyns. Kirton joined with Stephen and Margaret Jenyns, and with John Nechylls, in acquiring lands in Whitstable, Seasalter, Chilham and Boughton under Blean, Kent, in 1505.

== The Mayoral year, 1508–1509 ==
Transferring again as alderman to the Lime Street ward (where he remained thereafter), in 1508 Jenyns advanced to the Mayoralty. It was perhaps then that his daughter Katherine married John Nechylls, Merchant Taylor and Merchant of the Staple at Calais, for in November 1508 Jenyns, together with John and his wife Katherine, became the principal feoffees of premises in St Andrew, Cornhill, to the use of John and Katherine and the heirs of John forever. They had one daughter and heir, Joan Nechylls, who was born c. 1510. Nechylls was, like Jenyns, a native of Wolverhampton, and at about this time Jenyns began to acquire land there with the intention of founding a free Grammar school in the town. His daughter Elizabeth also married a Merchant Taylor, William Stalworth, in that year churchwarden of St. Martin Outwich.

In the year of his Mayoralty Sir Stephen and Dame Margaret Jenyns presented a Lectionary (with 16 devotional illustrations for the major feasts) to the church of St. Mary Aldermanbury, of which they were parishioners, which entered the Royal Collection and is now in the British Library. Among the images are the Nativity of Christ, the Resurrection, Pentecost, the Feast of Corpus Christi and the Feast of St John the Baptist (patron of the Merchant Taylors). A scene for the Feast of All Saints shows the blessed company of Heaven, with St. Stephen, St John the Baptist and St. Margaret of Antioch in the foreground representing the patrons of the donors.

Jenyns was the first Merchant Taylor to be Mayor, and was elected through a special intervention by King Henry VII. Thomas Exmew and Richard Smith (Master of the Merchant Taylors in 1503) were his Sheriffs. They officiated in that capacity at the funeral of Henry VII in May 1509: Mayor and aldermen met the cortège with the body at London Bridge, and accompanied it thence to St Paul's, on the next day to Westminster, and on the third day making their offering at the tomb in order of precedence. Immediately Edmund Dudley and Sir Richard Empson, reviled counsellors of the late monarch, were arrested and imprisoned in the Tower.

The coronation of King Henry VIII followed. On 23 June the royal procession went from the Tower of London to Westminster, the streets lined with the Crafts of all occupations, culminating with Stephen Jenyns and the aldermen. The rite accomplished, Henry conferred knighthood on Jenyns before sitting at his feast, at which the Mayor served him with Hippocras in a golden cup: having drained it, the King made the customary gift to him of the cup. In this service he was assisted by twelve men chosen from the Livery Companies. Three weeks later Jenyns led the Justices, Sir Robert Rede and others, hearing Dudley's indictment for Constructive treason at the London Guildhall, and was present at the arraignment. The prisoners were condemned, and Jenyns and his fellow inquisitors received a Commission of gaol delivery for Newgate Prison on 1 October 1509.

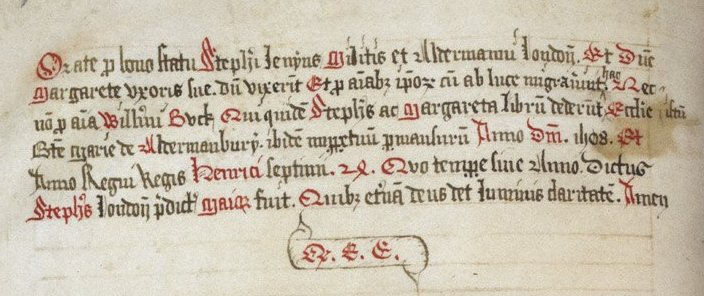
The Latin dedication in the book given to St. Mary Aldermanbury by Stephen and Margaret Jenyns, fol. 1v.

Evidently the gift of the Lectionary was made in 1508 but the inscription added after Stephen received his knighthood in 1509. The lines of dedication, written in Latin, in translation read:

"Pray for the welfare of Stephen Jenyns Knight and Alderman of London and Dame Margaret his wife while they shall live, and for their souls when they shall pass hence from this light. Also for the soul of William Buck. Which Stephen and Margaret gave this book to the Church of Blessed Mary of Aldermanbury to remain there perpetually, in the Year of our Lord 1508, and in the 24th year of the reign of King Henry VII: in which time or year the said Stephen was Mayor of London aforesaid. May God grant the eternal clarity of light unto them. Amen."

== Intrigue ==
Jenyns and Kirton were embroiled in John Ernley's attempts to benefit from Dudley's fall. John Kirton was the principal feoffee for Ernley and Dudley when in 1508 Roger Lewknor, son of Richard Lewknor deceased, ceded the manor of Sheffield in Fletching, East Sussex and many Sussex lands to them, in a bargain to escape conviction for murder. Dudley, awaiting conviction in the Tower, declared a will, making Sir Andrew Windsor, John Colet, Dr Yonge and Bishop FitzJames his executors or feoffees, seeking to thwart Ernley's intentions. In February 1511, one ninth part of the manor and lands were granted to Ernley. Kirton and his associates (including Jenyns and Tyngeldon) refused to surrender the evidences to Ernley, who brought suit and writ dated June 1512. Ernley's interrogation of Lewknor sought to identify his advisors. Dudley's receiver disclaimed any record of profits taken from Sheffield: Lewknor's indentures of sale, reserving an annuity for himself, were to Kirton's use entirely, and he stated that no interest of Dudley's had ever been expressed or intended. Jenyns also knew of none, and called for the executors to be summoned: Windsor and Colet described the declaration of the will. The first stipulation of Ernley's will (written in 1518) required a bond for Kirton's covenant to be paid to the king, and the closing phrases voluntarily compensated Lewknor's family.

== Wolverhampton: Grammar School, and connections ==
In September 1512 the Master and Wardens of the Merchant Taylors received a Mortmain licence by Letters Patent, to acquire possessions worth £20 a year to support a Master and Usher (i.e. second master) in the grammar school 'to teach boys literature and good behaviour' which Jenyns intended to erect and found in Wolverhampton. Pursuant to this, in April 1513 Jenyns was granted similar licence to alienate the manor of Rushock, Worcestershire, near Chaddesley Corbett, worth £14 a year, to them for that purpose. John Nechylls was one of the attorneys appointed in May 1515 by Jenyns to grant livery of seisin of the manor to the Merchant Taylors, which was completed in June following. By this time the school had presumably been built. Nechylls later gave 20 shillings a year towards the Usher's wages.

Staffordshire men witnessed the Rushock grant: John Jenyns and Thomas Nechills were probably the founder's kinsmen. Also present was William Offley, Bailiff of Stafford in 1510–11, whose eldest son Thomas Offley was sent to London, aged 12, to study with William Lily. In 1512 Lily became the first Master of St. Paul's School, London, then newly founded by John Colet. John Nechylls (who held an important early copy of Chaucer's's translation of Boethius's work De Consolatione Philosophiae) was 'of great acquaintance' with Lily, and Thomas became his apprentice for 13 years' service in Merchandize of the Staple. In due course Offley summoned his sisters and brother John to London, who found their several places within the sphere of Nechylls and the wealthy Leveson brothers (leading representatives of Wolverhampton mercantile interests in London). Stephen Jenyns took his godson Stephen Kirton for his own apprentice. Margaret the wife of John Kirton having died, John remarried to Anna (Ruskyn), widow of John Leek (died 1508), a man of Nuneaton origins, who purchased an estate at Edmonton in 1491.

== Dame Margaret's family ==
Stephen Jenyns and Dame Margaret 'my moder' were remembered in the will of Jenyns's stepson William Buck (mercer, died 1514). John Stow recorded the tomb of 'Dame Margaret Jeninges, wife to Stephen Jeninges, mayor,' as he thought dated 1515, at the church of St Mary Aldermanbury. However Christopher Rawson, Mercer of London and Stapler of Calais, who married William's sister Agnes Buck, bequeathed 'to Sir Stephyn Jenyns and my good Lady his wif' a ring of gold of 20 shillings graven with the Five Holy Wounds in 1518. Also William Stalworth, Jenyns's own son-in-law, died in 1519 leaving 'my maister Jenyns and my Lady his wif' a black gowne of 20 shillings the yard, and making 'my brother John Nichells' his overseer: his wife Elizabeth survived him.

The Inquisition post mortem of William Buck the elder (died 1501–02), taken in 1532, shows that Margaret Buck his widow – Dame Margaret Jenyns – died on 16 March 1522. Margaret having received the profits from Buck's properties in Aldermanbury and Ludgate until her death, Sir Stephen Jenyns took them in 1522 and 1523, when they reverted to the eldest son, John Buck. On 28 February 1522 Jenyns had passed deeds for property in Aldermanbury to Thomas Buck. Thomas died in November 1523, making provision for his wife and son and for his brother Matthew Buck: Matthew was still living in 1530.

== Church of St. Andrew, Cornhill ==
Dame Margaret Jenyns was therefore still living, and was a parishioner of Aldermanbury, when Sir Stephen undertook his last important project, which was to collaborate as a patron in the rebuilding of the church of St Andrew, Cornhill in London, also called St. Andrew Undershaft. Jenyns's involvement in the work is recorded in the 1598 and 1603 editions of John Stow's Survey of London. He wrote that the church

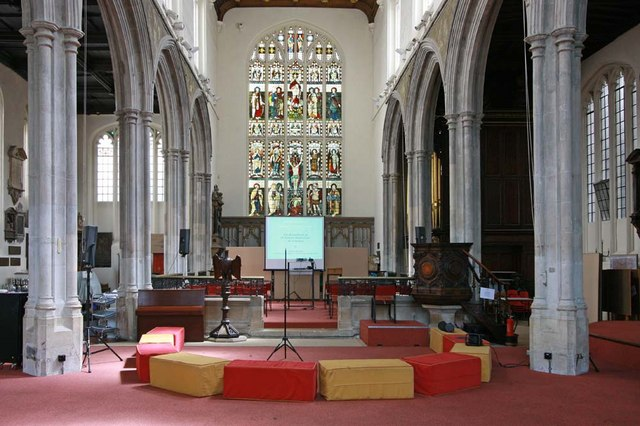
Interior of St Andrew Undershaft, looking east.

"hath beene new builded by the parishioners there, since the year 1520. every man putting to his helping hande, some with their purses, other with their bodies: Steven Gennings marchant Taylor, sometime mayor of London, caused at his charges to bee builded the whole North side of the greate Middle Ile [aisle], both of the body [nave] and quier [choir], as appeareth by his arms over every pillar graven, and also the North Ile, which hee roofed with timber and seeled [ceiled], also the whole South side of the Church was glased, and the Pewes in the south Chappell made of his costes, as appeareth in every Window, and upon the said pewes."

Jenyns died before the work was finished, and Stow reported that John Kerkbie, John Garlande and Nicholas Leveson contributed to its completion in 1532. Sir William FitzWilliam was also substantially involved. St Andrew Undershaft is one of the very few medieval churches to have survived in the present-day City of London.

== Death and legacy ==
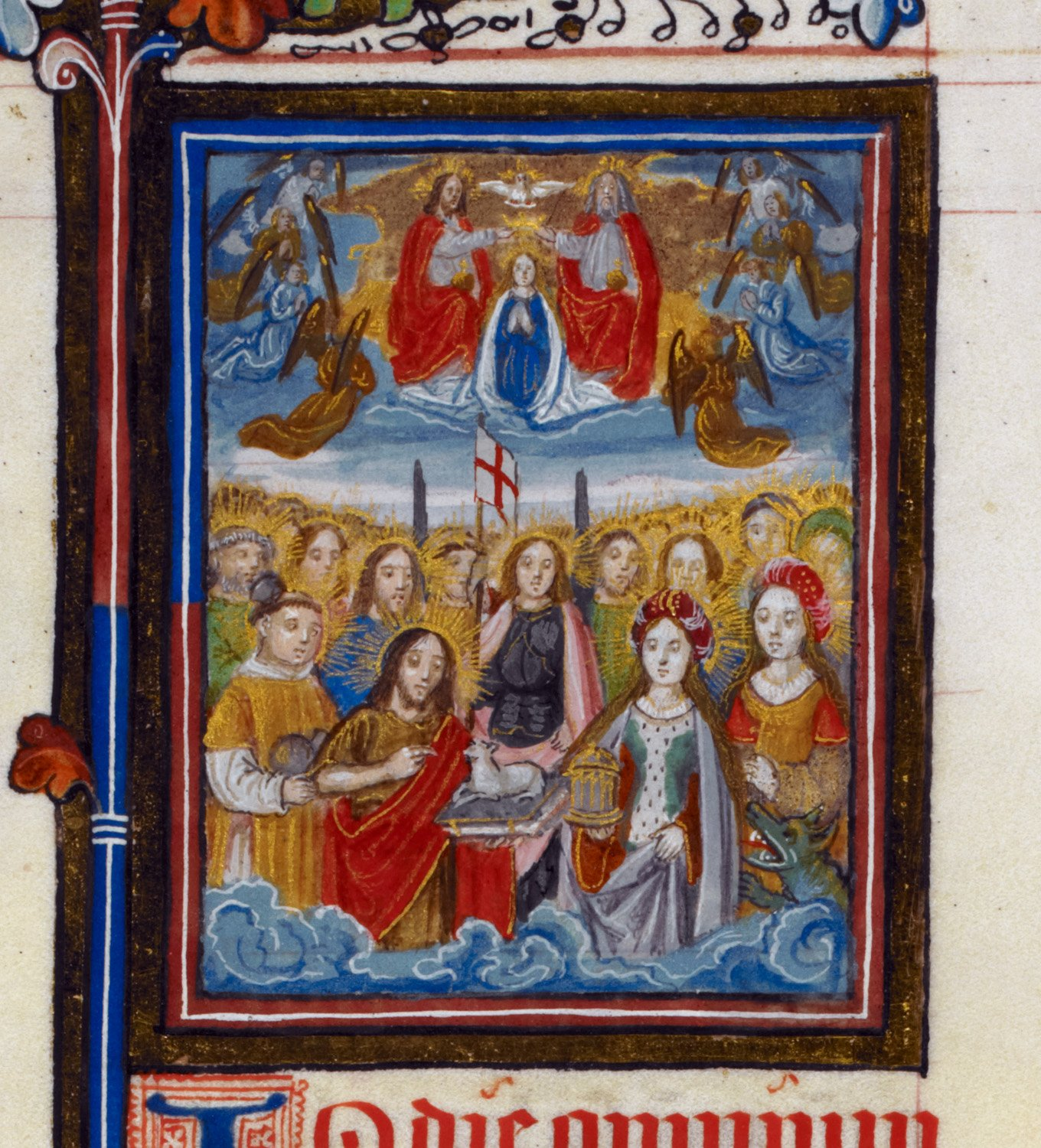
All Saints: The Coronation of the Virgin above, and St John the Baptist, St George (armour) and St Mary Magdalene (to anoint) with the Agnus Dei below. Left and right, St Stephen and St Margaret. Jenyns Lectionary, fol. 34.

=== Wills and exequies ===
Jenyns made his will on 29 January 1521/2, appointing John Nechylls and John Kirton his executors and John Baker overseer. He was to be buried in the conventual church of the London Greyfriars. He desired them to arrange that 24 poor men's children 'such as can say our lady matens or the psalme of Deprofundis' should bear torches at his funeral, and that the five orders of Friars, the priests of the Fraternities and of St Augustine Papey, and the 60 priests and company of the Fraternity of Parish Clerks of London should accompany his funeral procession. He provided for many masses of requiem and dirige, for his soul and for the souls of his wives, to be sung by the priors and convents of Elsing Spital (St. Mary within Cripplegate), of St Mary Spital without Bishopsgate and of the London Charterhouse, the Abbots of Faversham, Boxley and Stratford, the Franciscan friars at Greenwich and Richmond, and the two Lazar houses; and there were plenty of charitable bequests to be made. This will was proved on 28 May 1523.

In June 1522 he made a separate will to John Bennett, granting three parcels of land or property in London, and provision for the payment for his obits, to the Merchant Taylors. Bennett fulfilled his intention in 1527: this was a means of assuring the Guild's future title to the property. Obits were still being kept for him by the Merchant Taylors at St. Martin Outwich during the 1540s, but the moneys reserved for that purpose at the Greyfriars were surrendered to be stripped of their superstitious uses (and given over to profane ones).

=== Tomb and heraldry ===
Jenyns had a tomb prepared for himself in the Apostles Chapel on the south side of the choir of the church. His monument is illustrated in polychrome in the Book of Funerals of Sir Thomas Wriothesley, Garter King of Arms (died 1534). In this Herald's image the long sides of the rectangular tomb-chest are shown each divided into three equal panels framed by slender squared pilaster strips with gothic detailing. Each panel encloses a quatrefoil containing a large heraldic shield, and there is a single panel of the same kind at either end. The central panel of the sides and foot show the Jenyns emblazonment: Argent a chevron gules between three plummets sable. The four outer shields on the long sides repeat a Jenyns impalement with another coat, and at the head end of the chest is a shield (Barry nebuly of six argent and sable on a chief gules a lion passant guardant or), for the Merchants of the Staple.

On the slab above, the tinctured figure of Sir Stephen Jenyns is presented in full-length effigy (possibly in alabaster). He is shown in military armour under a long red robe with furred lining, with his gold chain over, and his hands in prayer: his armoured feet rest on a recumbent greyhound and his head (clean-shaven, with long black hair) on his crested helm. The crest is: A griffin's head couped between two wings inverted proper in the beak a plummet pendant sable. This tomb was one of the great number listed by John Stow as having been destroyed or utterly defaced by Sir Martin Bowes.

=== Family and kin ===
Jenyns's granddaughters Joan Nechylls and Elizabeth Stalworth were both living at his death. The children of John Kirton and Christopher Rawson were also remembered in the will. After Katherine Nechylls (Jenyns's daughter) died, John Nechylls married Margaret Offley (Thomas Offley's sister) who had lived in his household as a servant, and secured her fortunes. John Offley took up residence in Nychills's house at Hackney, Middlesex. Nechylls died in December 1530, having promised his daughter and heir Joan to Thomas Offley, who married her. Stephen Kirton, who as Jenyns's apprentice received a legacy of £20 from him, married Margaret, Offley's sister and now Nechylls's widow: he was admitted to Gray's Inn in 1534. Another Offley sister, Margery, became the second wife of James Leveson. Thomas Offley and Stephen Kirton became highly successful wool merchants shipping through Calais during the following decades. Two of John Kirton's children, William and Margaret, married two of the Leek children, their step-siblings, and the later Leek family of Wyer Hall at Edmonton were Margaret Kirton's descendants.

=== Foundations ===
Jenyns bequeathed £40 towards the recovery to Civic patronage of the Bethlehem without Bishopsgate Hospital, if it could be achieved within three years of his death. The School at Wolverhampton remained fully under the control of the Worshipful Company of Merchant Taylors until the later 18th century. After an interval the company's interest was reinstated under different terms, and continues fruitfully to the present time. Thomas Offley, whose father had witnessed the original endowment, acquired the manor of Madeley, Staffordshire, in 1547 and was involved in the administration of the Rushock estate. The volume of Chaucer's Boethius, its endpapers much scribbled upon, remained with the Kirtons and Offleys (apparently in London, and then in Thorpe Mandeville) down to the 1560s. The church of St Andrew Undershaft became the family vault of Jenyns's descendants and dependants, as the burial-place of John Nechylls, Nicholas Leveson, Stephen Kirton, Sir Thomas Offley and his half-brother Alderman Hugh Offley, and also of David Woodroffe (Sheriff, and Merchant of the Staple of Calais), whose son Nicholas Woodroffe married a daughter of Stephen Kirton and Margaret Offley.
