= Philip Henman =

British transport entrepreneur

Philip Sydney Henman (1899–1986) was a British transport entrepreneur. He is best known today for being the creator of The Philip Henman Trust.

== Early life ==
At age 15, Henman was severely ill and found himself bedridden for a year with a fever and forced to leave his studies at Caterham School. After two years in the army, he spent a further two years queuing up at the dole office during The Great Depression that followed World War I. He then moved to London, where he found work running lighterage on two dilapidated ex-army barges on the River Thames.

== The General Lighterage Company ==
Over the next thirty years Henman used his experience in logistics to turn the fledgling The General Lighterage Company, started in 1922, into a public international transport company. It later became in 1957 The Transport Development Group and then a public limited company (PLC) in 1982 re-registered as the Transport Development Group plc. The company now has over 7,000 employees across Europe.

TDG Plc timeline
1922 The General Lighterage Co Ltd. was formed from the lighterage department of the London Cologne Steam Ship Company.
1950 Became a public limited company.
1957 Changed its name to Transport Development Group.
1982 Re-registered as a plc – Transport Development Group plc.
2000 Changed its name to TDG plc.

== The Philip Henman Trust ==
The original aims of the trust, since its inception in 1986, were to continue funding causes supported by Henman during his lifetime but its remit has since changed focus.

After ten years the trust's trustees felt a need to restructure and a consultant was brought in to recommend more effective grant making. The trust now spends all its grant expenditure on long-term projects operated by major UK overseas development charities.

Henman was well known for his philanthropy. He took a personal interest in every cause he supported and today there are many memorials to his charity both in Britain and abroad. His list of Beneficiaries and benefactors, contained in a small diary that was discovered after his death, shows the enormous diversity of his interests and it is for this reason that the trust today has little restriction on the nature of the charities it will support. It is still running till to this day.

== Other achievements ==
Henman was also a Dorking councillor, a Deputy Lord Lieutenant of Surrey, the High Sheriff of Surrey (1971), the vice president and an honorary fellow of the Chartered Institute of Transport, a patron of the Royal College of Surgeons, and a member of court of the Worshipful Company of Farmers, and he was given an honorary doctorate from the University of Surrey.

== See also ==
- Cory Environmental
- Foster Yeoman
