= William Goring (Sussex MP, died 1554) =

English member of parliament

Sir William Goring (born before 1500, died 1554) was an English landowner, administrator, courtier and politician. He served in the Parliament of England in 1539 and 1547, representing Sussex. He also served as the chamberlain of the household of Queen Anne of Cleves from 1540 until 1546.

Goring was a groom of the privy chamber to Edward VI, and was appointed the Keeper of Woolaving Great Park at East Lavington in Sussex in succession to another groom, John Fowler.
