= John Ashburnham (died 1417) =

English politician (died 1417)

John Ashburnham of Ashburnham, Sussex (died 22 November 1417) was an English politician. He sat as MP for Sussex in January 1397 and September 1397.

He also served as sheriff of Surrey and Sussex from 9 December 1395 till 1 December 1396, 29 November 1402 till 5 November 1403, 4 November 1409 till 29 November 1410; commissioner of inquiry concerning Salman estates in Surey and Sussex in November 1397; commissioner to collect an aid in Sussex in December 1401; commissioner of arrest in August 1403 and commissioner of array in November 1403 and May 1415.

He was the son and heir of John Ashburnham of Ashburnham. He married an unknown woman and had one son.
