= Anne Gainsford =

16th c courtier and lady-in-waiting to Anne Boleyn and Jane Seymour

- Born: 1505; Crowhurst, Surrey, England
- Died: before 16 July 1548.
- Other name: Nan Gainsford
- Known for: Lady-in-waiting to Queen Anne Boleyn
- Title: Lady Zouche
- Spouse: Sir George Zouche of Codnor Castle
- Children: 8
- Parent(s): John Gainsford; Anne Hawte

Anne Gainsford, Lady Zouche (died before 16 July 1548) was a close friend and lady-in-waiting to Queen consort Anne Boleyn.

She was in the household of Anne Boleyn, as early as 1528 before the latter became the second wife of Henry VIII of England five years later. She served Anne Boleyn before and after her own marriage to Sir George Zouche of Codnor. According to one source, It was Anne to whom Anne Boleyn lent her proscribed copy of William Tyndale's The Obedience of a Christian Man. After it was stolen in jest by her bethrothed, George Zouche, it fell into the hands of Cardinal Thomas Wolsey. After its return, Anne Boleyn persuaded the King to read the book.

Following Anne Boleyn's marriage to the King in 1533, Anne remained in her service as her lady-in-waiting.

It has been widely believed that George Wyatt, the first biographer of Anne Boleyn, was provided information about Queen Anne from Anne Gainsford. However, being that Anne died years before the writer was born this can hardly be true.

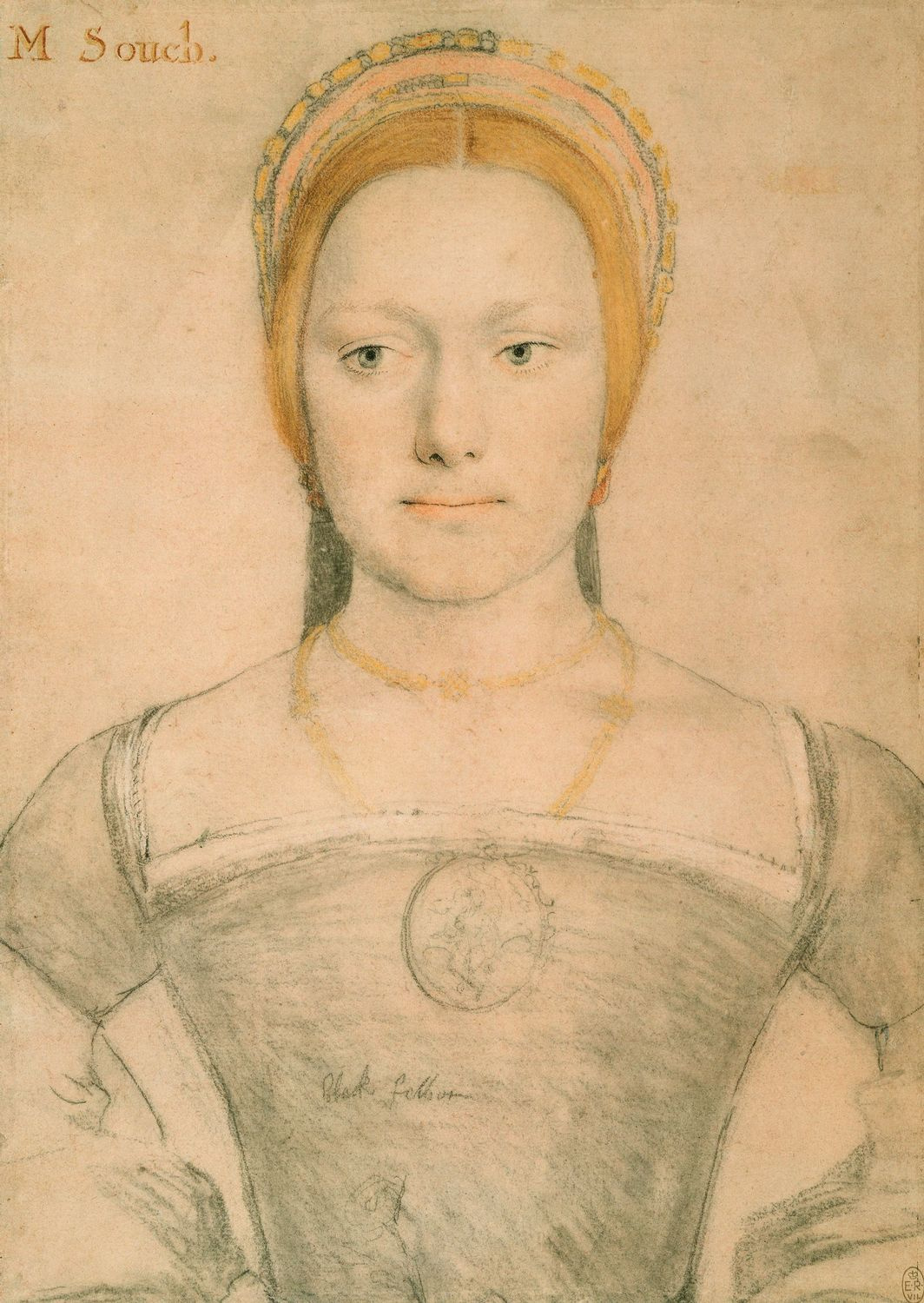
Hans Holbein chalk portrait of a woman whom some art historians identify as Anne Gainsford; however, it's more likely to be that of Mary Zouche, another lady-in-waiting. The name M. Souch in the top left corner of the portrait could indicate either Mistress Zouche or Mary Zouche

== Anne Boleyn's household ==
Anne Gainsford was born on an unknown date in Crowhurst, Surrey, England, a daughter of John Gainsford by his second wife, Anne Hawte, the daughter of Richard Haute (d. 8 April 1487) and Elizabeth Tyrrell, widow of Sir Robert Darcy (c.1420 – 2 November 1469) of Maldon, Essex, and daughter of Sir Thomas Tyrrell (d. 28 March 1477) of Heron in East Horndon, Essex. She had a sister, Mary.

Sometime before 1528, she entered the household of Anne Boleyn, who was being courted by King Henry VIII. She served as Anne Boleyn's waiting-woman, and was referred to by her mistress as Nan, which was the popular diminutive of the name Anne in the 16th century.

In 1528, according to biographer George Wyatt, an incident occurred at Court in which Anne Boleyn lent Anne her copy of William Tyndale's The Obedience of a Christian Man, a book that Cardinal Wolsey had proscribed. When it was taken from her hands in jest by her betrothed Sir George Zouche, it was later discovered in the latter's possession by Richard Sampson, Dean of the Chapel Royal, who promptly took it to his master, Cardinal Wolsey. When Anne Boleyn was informed of this, instead of being angry with Anne Gainsford for allowing it to fall into Wolsey's hands, she remarked that it would be "the dearest book that ever dean or cardinal took away", and swiftly sought out the King and complained about its confiscation by Wolsey. As soon as the book was returned to her, by the King's orders, Anne Boleyn persuaded the King "most tenderly" to read the book himself, which he did and was duly impressed. He described it as a book "for me and all kings to read". It was therefore through the carelessness of Anne Gainsford that Henry VIII managed to read Tyndale's banned book which denounced papal power in favour of that of secular rulers.

There was another incident at Court in which Anne Gainsford played a minor part. In 1530, a book of ancient prophecies appeared in Anne Boleyn's apartments, which when opened showed three crude drawings representing the King, Catherine of Aragon, and Anne Boleyn. The figure of Anne lacked a head. When Anne Gainsford was shown the book with its drawings by her mistress, she allegedly remarked, "If I thought it true, though he were an emperor, I would not myself marry him". Whereas Anne Boleyn, according to Anne, dismissed the book as a bauble.

In 1533, Anne's mistress became Queen of England and she remained a part of Anne Boleyn's household as one of her ladies-in-waiting. That same year she married Sir George Zouche, who became a gentleman pensioner to the King. Three years later in 1536 Queen Anne was charged with High Treason and adultery. Following the Queen's execution, she went on the serve the latter's successor, Jane Seymour in the same capacity as lady-in-waiting.

== Later years ==
Anne and Sir George made their principal home at Codnor Castle, Derbyshire and they had eight children. There is no evidence to substantiate the claim that her contemporary Bess of Hardwick was raised by Anne in her household.

Her children included:

- John Zouch of Codnor
- Margaret Zouch, who married Augustine Babington of Normanton (died 1559).
- George Zouch
- William Zouch
- Lucy, Frances, Anne, and Audrey.

At the end of the 16th century, George Wyatt, grandson of poet Sir Thomas Wyatt, and one of Anne Boleyn's first biographers, compiled his work largely from the reminiscences of one of Anne Boleyn's serving women. Samuel Weller Singer, the nineteenth-century editor of Wyatt’s work, identified the lady as Anne Gainsford. Historians accepted Weller Singer’s erroneous identification of “Nan” as Anne Gainsford even though, in the words of Anne Boleyn’s most prominent biographer Eric Ives, “given such links, the volume of material Wyatt recorded is disappointing”. Research of Anne Boleyn's female household by Sylvia Barbara Soberton proves that Weller Singer was wrong in his identification of Wyatt's informant because Anne Gainsford died before George Wyatt was even born. In his last will dating to 16 July 1548, George Zouche, Gainsford’s husband, made it clear that he had remarried since he mentioned “Elleyn now my well-beloved wife”. Sir George Wyatt was born c. 1553, some five years after George Zouche’s last will was written. Sylvia Barbara Soberton argues that Weller Singer’s identification of the maid serving Anne Boleyn as Anne Gainsford was influenced by Wyatt’s description of an incident with a woman of Anne’s household reading a banned book that ended up on Cardinal Wolsey’s desk. This woman was identified as Anne Gainsford by John Louth, Archdeacon of Nottingham, whose reminiscences were published in John Foxe’s Book of Martyrs. By the time Weller Singer edited and published Wyatt’s work, Louth’s account of Anne Gainsford, George Zouch and Anne Boleyn reading William Tyndale was already well known. Weller Singer included Louth’s reminiscences in his edition of Wyatt’s biography. Soberton argues that the two book incidents were very similar, but the chronology in Wyatt’s account is muddled; he describes that it happened following Henry VIII and Anne Boleyn’s wedding in January 1533 and has Wolsey interrogating the maid’s suitor, though Wolsey died three years earlier.
