= Gervase de Cornhill =

12th-century English sheriff and royal official

Justice of London
- In office 1147 – c. 1183

Sheriff of London
- In office 1155–1157

Sheriff of London
- In office 1160–1161

Sheriff of Surrey
- In office 1167–1174

Sheriff of Kent
- In office 1163 – c. 1183

Royal Justice
- In office 1170 – c. 1183

Personal details
- Born: Gervase c. 1110
- Died: c. 1183
- Spouse(s): Agnes, daughter of Edward of Cornhill
- Children: Henry; Reginald; Ralph

Gervase de Cornhill (sometimes Gervase of Cornhill; c. 1110 – c. 1183) was an Anglo-Norman royal official and sheriff. Beginning his royal service as a justice in London in 1147, he continued to serve both King Stephen of England and Henry II until his death around 1183. He played a minor role in the Becket controversy in 1170.

== Early life ==
According to medievalist Katharine Keats-Rohan, Gervase was the son of Roger, who was the nephew of Hubert, the queen's chamberlain. Other scholars are less sure that Gervase was Roger's son, and argue that Gervase was Hubert's nephew. Gervase was likely born around 1110. (Note: A thirteenth-century account states that Gervase was the son of Hubert of Caen, but this account is unlikely because Gervase held lands at Chalk, Kent that had previously been held by Roger.) He married Agnes, the daughter of Edward of Cornhill. After his marriage, he became known as de Cornhill because of his wife's property.

== Royal administrator ==
Gervase was royal justice in London in 1147, and continued to claim that title through the 1170s on his personal seal. He was one of the members of the royal administration under King Stephen of England. Gervase was also a merchant and financier. Around 1143 he loaned money to Stephen's wife Matilda of Boulogne, and received in pledge land at Gamlingay in Cambridgeshire. The queen was unable to repay the debt, and the lands pledged eventually became Gervase's. Gervase also loaned money to Hugh Tirel, son of Walter Tirel, in 1146 to enable Hugh to go on the Second Crusade. In return, Hugh pledged the manor of Langham in Essex to Gervase.

Gervase held the office of Sheriff of London in 1155 through 1157, 1160 and 1161, and may have held that office between 1159 and 1160 as well. He also held the office of Sheriff of Surrey from 1163 until his death as well as the office of Sheriff of Kent from 1167 to 1174. Gervase was named a judge on one of the eyre circuits in 1170.

== Later life ==
In 1170, Gervase was involved with attempts to keep Thomas Becket, who had been in exile, from returning to England. Working with Gervase were Roger de Pont L'Évêque the Archbishop of York, Gilbert Foliot the Bishop of London, Josceline de Bohon the Bishop of Salisbury, Reginald de Warenne the Sheriff of Sussex, and Ranulf de Broc. Gervase was part of the party that met Becket at Sandwich on 1 December 1170 when the archbishop returned to England. The lay members of the group, led by Gervase, complained that the archbishop was sowing dissension in the land by his excommunication of the three ecclesiastics who were with the group, but Becket managed to calm the officials by stating he would consider the matter and reply to them the next day. The next day the group was accompanied by some clergy sent by the ecclesiastics who had been excommunicated by Becket. Nothing further was accomplished by this meeting except further offers from Becket to consider other options. Afterwards, Gervase and Ranulf de Broc tried to discover which of the citizens of London had welcomed Becket back into the kingdom, but were frustrated by refusal of the London clergy to appear and by the laymen refusing to answer to anything but royal writs.

Gervase may be identical with the Gervase who in 1174 presented a loyalty speech to King Henry II from the citizens of London. In 1177 Gervase, along with Richard de Luci, the justiciar and Roger fitzReinfrid, assessed land taxes and heard judicial cases in Middlesex and Hampshire.

Gervase held lands in London inherited from his father-in-law, lands in Kent from his father, and lands in Gamlingay which he got through a mortgage. He also acquired other lands in Essex and Surrey. He also gave lands at Greenwich and East Lewisham to St. Peter's Abbey in Ghent and other lands to Holy Trinity Priory at Aldgate.

== Death and legacy ==
Gervase died between Michaelmas in 1183 and Michaelmas 1184. Gervase's offspring were Henry, Reginald (or Rainald), and Ralph. Ralph was also Sheriff of Kent (1191–1192) and Surrey (1191–1194). The medieval writer William of Canterbury said that Gervase was "thinking of his usurious two-thirds and hundredths rather than of what was good and right".
