= Henry de Cornhill (sheriff) =

12th-century English sheriff and baron

Sheriff of London
- In office 1187–1189

Sheriff of Surrey
- In office c. 1189 – 1192

Sheriff of Kent
- In office 1190–1192

Personal details
- Born: Henry c. 1135
- Died: c. 1193
- Spouse(s): Alice, daughter of William de Courcy
- Children: Joan de Cornhill

Henry de Cornhill (c. 1135 – c. 1193) was a medieval English royal official and sheriff who served King Henry II of England. Henry's son King Richard I of England put him in charge of assembling part of the fleet for the Third Crusade, plus appointing him as sheriff of three jurisdictions. Through marriage he acquired lands in Somerset, Dorset, Oxfordshire, and Northamptonshire.

== Early life ==
Henry de Cornhill was the eldest son of Gervase de Cornhill, a royal official and Sheriff of Kent, Surrey, and London during the reign of King Henry II. Henry de Cornhill was likely born around 1135. Henry married Alice, the daughter of William de Courcy, and sister and heiress of William de Courcy, lord of Stogursey in Somerset. Through this marriage, Henry acquired lands in Somerset, Dorset, Oxfordshire, and Northamptonshire worth 25 and a quarter knight's fees.

== Career ==
By 1175, Henry was a royal official in charge of purchasing cloth and other items for the royal household. He also was given custody of two estates that had escheated to the crown – Rayleigh in 1181 and Boulogne in 1183. Henry often acted as a purchaser for the king, for example, in 1188 Cornhill spent 290 pounds on gold, jewels, furs, and cloth for the king. Henry was present at the deathbed of Henry II in 1189. The new king, Richard I, kept Henry close and put him in charge of assembling the fleet that Richard needed to go on the Third Crusade. His accounts for his efforts in 1190 in assembling the fleet still survive. These show that Henry bought part or all of 40 ships and paid out a year's wages for over a thousand sailors for the expedition. The total expenses for Henry's efforts totalled over 5,000 pounds.

Henry was appointed to the office of Sheriff of Surrey early in the reign of King Richard I. He was also Sheriff of Kent during Richard's reign, in 1190 as well as one of the Sheriffs of London from 1187 to 1189. Henry was only one of six sheriffs that retained office after the accession of Richard I. He owed his appointments to the influence of William Longchamp, Richard's chancellor. He was also Warden of the Mint in 1191. Henry lost his offices when Longchamp fell from favour in 1192. He died sometime between Michaelmas 1192 and Michaelmas 1193.

== Death and legacy ==
Henry's heir was his daughter Joan, who married Hugh de Neville, either in or soon after 1195. He left debts at his death that his brothers Reginald de Cornhill and Ralph were responsible for. His widow married Warin fitzGerold sometime in 1193. Warin was the son of Henry fitzGerold.
