= John Fowler (by 1520 – c. 1575) =

English politician

John Fowler (by 1520 – c. 1575), of London, was an English Member of Parliament and courtier.

He was the son of Richard Fowler of Ludgershall, Buckinghamshire and his second wife Julian, daughter of Sir John Shaw, goldsmith and Lord Mayor of London. Sir Richard Fowler, Chancellor of the Exchequer to Edward IV. By 1547 he was a Groom of the Privy Chamber to Edward VI and was befriended by Thomas Seymour, who used him when seeking the king's approval for his marriage to Catherine Parr. Fowler wrote to Seymour with news of the court in July 1548. Edward VI was very interested in the progress of the siege of Haddington in Scotland and eagerly awaited letters forwarded by Somerset. Although he was briefly detained in the Tower as a result of his relationship with Seymour in 1549, he did not lose his role at Court and in 1551 was appointed keeper of Petworth park.

He sat as Member of Parliament (MP) for New Shoreham in March 1553, probably through the influence of Henry Fitzalan, 12th Earl of Arundel, who he succeeded at Petworth. He subsequently sat for Hythe in 1555 and Winchelsea in 1558, through the influence of Thomas Cheney, Lord Warden of the Cinque Ports. He retained his court post under Elizabeth I and sat for Weymouth in 1559, and West Looe in 1563.

He was married to a woman called Anne by 1551, but had no issue.
