= William Dix (MP) =

16th-century English politician

William Dix (died 1596), of St. Giles, Cripplegate, London and of Wickmere, Norfolk, was an English politician.

He was a member (MP) of the parliament of England for New Shoreham in 1571.

Parliament of England
| Preceded by Henry Knollys; Nicholas Mynn | Member of Parliament for New Shoreham; 1571; With: John Bowles | Succeeded by Edward Lewknor; Edward Fenner |
