= William Goring =

William Goring may refer to:

- Sir William Goring (Sussex MP, died 1554), English MP, landowner and courtier
- Sir William Goring, 1st Baronet (c. 1595–1658), MP for Sussex
- Sir William Goring, 3rd Baronet (c. 1659–1724), of the Goring baronets
- William Goring (cricketer) (1811–1849), English cricketer
- Sir William Goring, 13th Baronet (1933–2024), of the Goring baronets
