= John Weston =

John Weston may refer to:

== Politicians ==
- John Weston (MP for New Shoreham) (fl.1446-7)
- John de Weston, MP for Derby (UK Parliament constituency)
- John Weston (MP fl.1339), MP for Derby (UK Parliament constituency)
- John Weston (died c. 1433), MP for Worcester, Worcestershire and Warwick
- John Weston (1651–1712), MP for Guildford and Surrey
- John Weston (Canadian politician) (born 1958), Canadian MP for West Vancouver—Sunshine Coast—Sea to Sky Country
- Sir John Weston, 1st Baronet (1852–1926), British MP for Kendal, 1913–1918 and Westmorland, 1918–1924
- John Kael Weston, American diplomat, author, and politician

== Others ==
- John Weston (aviator) (1872–1950), aviation pioneer in South Africa
- John Weston (businessman), British businessman
- John Weston (diplomat) (born 1938), British diplomat
- John Weston (footballer) (1900–1984), English association football player
- John Weston (RAF officer) (1908–1979), signals officer in the Royal Air Force
- John F. Weston (1845–1917), United States Army general and Medal of Honor recipient
- John Harley Weston (born 1967), Scottish-born Australian singer-songwriter
- John Weston, fictional character in the TV series In the Flesh
