= William Corveysor =

English politician

William Corveysor (fl. 1386), was an English politician.

He was a member (MP) of the parliament of England for New Shoreham in 1386.

Parliament of England
Preceded by Robert Frye; John Lenton	Member of Parliament for New Shoreham; 1386; With: Richard Bernard	Succeeded by Richard Bernard; Simon Benefeld
