= Richard Serle =

English politician

Richard Serle (fl. 1304–1307) was an English politician. He was a Member of the Parliament of England for New Shoreham in 1304–05 and 1307.

Parliament of England
Preceded by Henry de Burne; Roger de Beauchamp	Member of Parliament for New Shoreham; 1304–05; With: Simon Iveny	Succeeded by Richard Must; Richard Serle
Parliament of England
Preceded by Richard Serle; Simon Iveny	Member of Parliament for New Shoreham; 1307; With: Richard Must	Succeeded by John Virley; John Frewyn
