= Charles Goring =

Charles Goring may refer to:

- Charles Goring (1743–1829), British country landowner and MP
- Charles Goring (1817–1849), British Conservative politician and MP
- Charles Buckman Goring (1870–1919), pioneer in criminology and author
- Charles Goring, 2nd Earl of Norwich (1615–1671), English soldier and aristocrat
- Charles Goring (cricketer), English cricketer (1831)
- Charles Goring (c. 1668–1713), an MP elected to the English Parliament in 1689
