= John Beauchamp =

John Beauchamp or John de Beauchamp may refer to:

- John de Beauchamp (MP for New Shoreham) (fl. 1330s), English politician
- John Beauchamp (MP for New Shoreham) (fl. 1330s–1340s), may well be the same person as the one above
- John de Beauchamp of Fifield, Member of Parliament for Essex, 1290
- John de Beauchamp, 1st Baron Beauchamp (first creation) (1274–1336)
- John de Beauchamp, 2nd Baron Beauchamp (first creation) (1304–1343) of Somerset
- John de Beauchamp, 1st Baron Beauchamp (second creation) (c. 1316–1360), also known as 1st Baron Beauchamp de Warwick
- John de Beauchamp, 3rd Baron Beauchamp (1329–1361), also known as 3rd Baron Beauchamp de Somerset
- John de Beauchamp, 1st Baron Beauchamp (fourth creation) (died 1388), administrator and landowner, also known as 1st Baron Beauchamp of Kidderminster
- John Beauchamp (died 1420), MP for Worcestershire 1401, 1404, 1414
- John Beauchamp, 1st Baron Beauchamp (fifth creation) (c. 1400–1475), nobleman and administrator
- John Beauchamp (Plymouth Company) (1592–1655), backer of the Plymouth Company
- John Beauchamp (cricketer) (1825–1911), English cricketer

== See also ==
- Baron Beauchamp, multiple other individuals
