= Richard Must =

English politician

Richard Must (fl. 1307) was an English politician.

He was a member (MP) of the parliament of England for New Shoreham in 1307.

Parliament of England
Preceded by Richard Serle; Simon Iveny	Member of Parliament for New Shoreham; 1307; With: Richard Serle	Succeeded by John Virley; John Frewyn
