= Henry Howard (1802–1875) =

British Member of Parliament

MP for New Shoreham
- In office 1826–1832 Serving with Sir Charles Burrell
- Preceded by: Sir Charles Burrell; Sir James Lloyd
- Succeeded by: Sir Charles Burrell; Sir Harry Goring

MP for Steyning
- In office 1824–1826 Serving with Sir George Philips
- Preceded by: Sir George Philips; Lord Henry Molyneux-Howard
- Succeeded by: Sir George Philips; Peter Du Cane

Personal details
- Born: 25 July 1802 Arundel, Sussex
- Died: 7 January 1875 (aged 72) Thornbury, Gloucestershire
- Spouse: Charlotte née Long (m. 1849)
- Relations: Esmé Howard, 1st Baron Howard of Penrith (son); Maj-Gen. Sir Algar Howard (grandson); Hon. Mervyn Herbert (grandson); Henry Howard, 13th Duke of Norfolk (cousin); Sir Francis Molyneux, 7th Baronet (cousin); Gen. Sir Redvers Buller VC (nephew)
- Children: 6
- Parent(s): Lord Henry Molyneux-Howard (f); Elizabeth née Long (m)
- Education: Harrow School

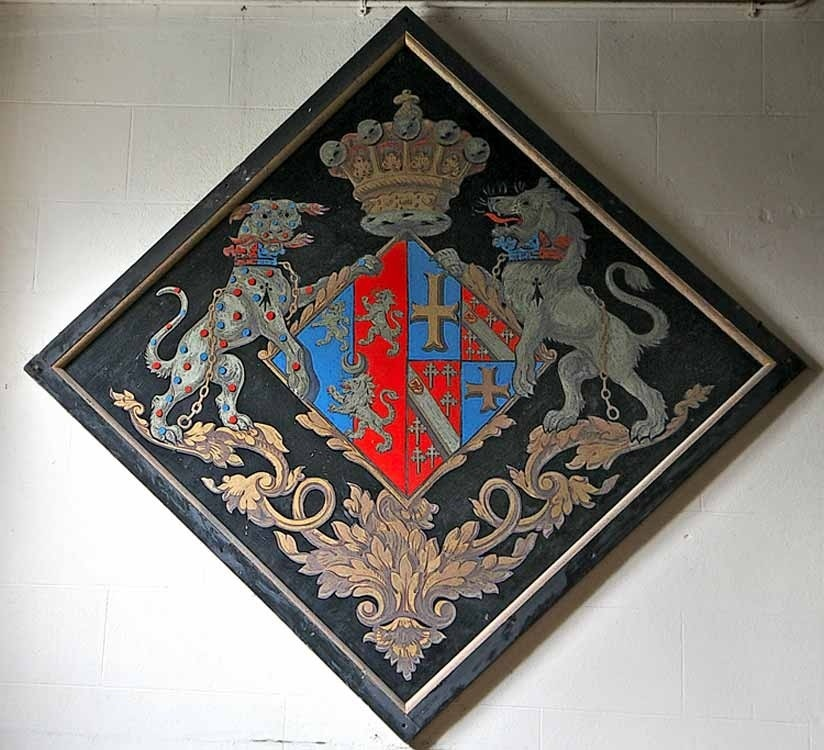
Arms of Henrietta, Dowager Countess of Carnarvon

Henry Howard-Molyneux-Howard (25 July 1802 – 7 January 1875), later known as Henry Howard, was a member of an Anglo-Catholic branch of the aristocratic Howard family and a prominent English landowner, who served as a Member of Parliament in the Hanoverian era.

== Family and background ==
Born Howard in 1802, the only son of Lord Henry Howard-Molyneux-Howard MP by his marriage to Elizabeth Long (who died 1834), his father assumed the additional surname of Molyneux by Royal Licence in 1812, then Howard-Molyneux-Howard in 1817.

Howard was bequeathed Greystoke Castle in 1815, when his uncle succeeded to the dukedom of Norfolk.

Henrietta, Countess of Carnarvon (died 1876), Isabella, Countess of Suffolk and Berkshire (died 1891), Charlotte Howard-Molyneux-Howard (died 1855; wife of James Wentworth Buller MP) and Juliana, Lady Ogilvy (died 1833) were his sisters.

His grandparents were, via his mother, the British colonial administrator Judge Edward Long, and, patrilineally, Juliana Molyneux (only surviving daughter and heiress-in-her-issue of Sir William Molyneux, 6th Baronet) and Henry Howard of Glossop (1713–1787), whose grandfather Colonel Bernard Howard (1641–1717) was the youngest son of Henry, Earl of Arundel and Surrey by Lady Elizabeth Stuart, and brother of the 5th and 6th Dukes of Norfolk.

Howard was educated at Harrow School, excelling at cricket, before setting off in 1822/23 on the Grand Tour.

== Career ==
Bequeathed Greystoke Castle, Cumberland by his kinsman in 1815, upon his father's death in 1824 he also inherited Thornbury Castle, Gloucestershire.

Resuming the surname Howard, he was elected to Parliament as a Whig representing the constituencies of Steyning from 30 June 1824 to 8 June 1826 and New Shoreham from 16 June 1826 to 15 December 1832.

A talented cricketer, Howard is recorded as playing in three matches, once in 1830 for the Marylebone Cricket Club (MCC), then for the Gentlemen in 1831, and for Sussex in 1832.

Howard served as President of Marylebone Cricket Club (for 1832/33) and as High Sheriff of Cumberland (for 1834/35).

== Personal life ==
On 6 December 1849, Howard married Charlotte Caroline Georgina Long (1823–1896), eldest daughter and co-heiress of Henry Lawes Long and Lady Catharine Walpole, having issue:

- Henry Howard (1850–1914), MP for Penrith, who married Lady Mabel McDonnell CBE, and had issue;
- Sir Stafford Howard (1851–1916), who married Lady Rachel Campbell, then Meriel Cowell-Stepney MBE, leaving issue;
- Robert Mowbray Howard JP DL (1854–1928), who married Louisa Georgina Sneyd (elder daughter and eventual heiress of the Revd Walter Sneyd JP FSA, of Keele Hall, Staffordshire), leaving issue including Major Henry Howard-Sneyd OBE;
- Elizabeth Catherine Howard (1856–1929), who married her first cousin Henry Herbert, 4th Earl of Carnarvon, and had issue including Colonel the Hon. Aubrey Herbert MP, whose daughter Laura became the second wife of writer Evelyn Waugh;
- Maud Isabel Howard (1858–1929), who married Francis William Leyborne Popham, of Littlecote House, Wiltshire (whose father was the cricketer, Francis Popham);
- Sir Esmé Howard (1863–1939), created Baron Howard of Penrith, who married Lady Isabella Giustiniani-Bandini, leaving issue.

=== Descendants ===
His grandson, the Hon. Mervyn Herbert, a diplomat, also played.

Another grandson, Major-General Sir Algar Howard, served as Garter King of Arms (1944–50).

Philip Esmé Howard, 3rd Baron Howard of Penrith, an asset manager, is his great-grandson.

== See also ==
- Howard family
- Greystoke Castle
- Thornbury Castle

Parliament of the United Kingdom
Preceded by Sir George Philips; Lord Henry Howard-Molyneux-Howard	Member of Parliament for Steyning; 1824–1826; With: Sir George Philips	Succeeded by Sir George Philips; Peter Du Cane
Preceded by Sir Charles Burrell; Sir James Lloyd	Member of Parliament for New Shoreham; 1826–1832; With: Sir Charles Burrell	Succeeded by Sir Charles Burrell; Sir Harry Goring
Honorary titles
Preceded by Henry Curwen	High Sheriff of Cumberland; 1834–1835	Succeeded by Richard Ferguson
