= Henry de Bourne =

English politician

Henry de Bourne (fl. 1313) was an English politician.

He was a member (MP) of the parliament of England for New Shoreham in 1313.

Parliament of England
Preceded by John Virley; John Frewyn	Member of Parliament for New Shoreham; 1313; With: William de Pevense	Succeeded by John Loute; John Baudefait
