= Sir Charles Burrell, 3rd Baronet =

English Conservative politician

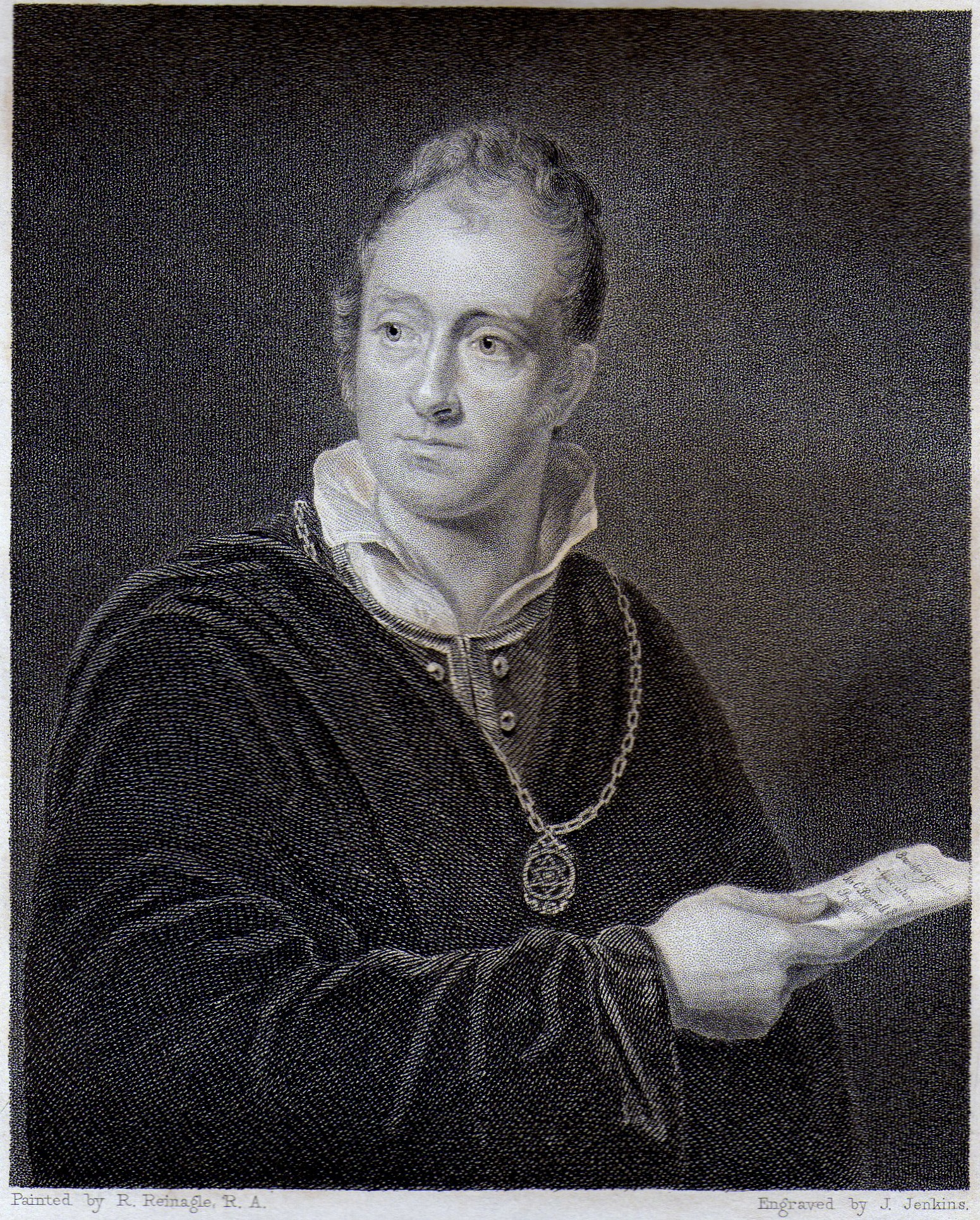
Engraving of Charles Merrik Burrell, published 1835 in The History, Antiquities and Topography of the County of Sussex by Thomas Walker Horsfield

Sir Charles Merrik Burrell, 3rd Baronet (24 May 1774 – 4 January 1862), was an English Conservative politician, who represented the seat of New Shoreham for fifty-six years, becoming Father of the House of Commons.

Burrell was born at Golden Square, London, the son of Sir William Burrell, 2nd Baronet, and his wife Sophia Raymond. He succeeded to the title of Baronet Raymond of Valentine House on 20 January 1796. In 1806 he was elected as MP for New Shoreham and he held the seat until his death in 1862.

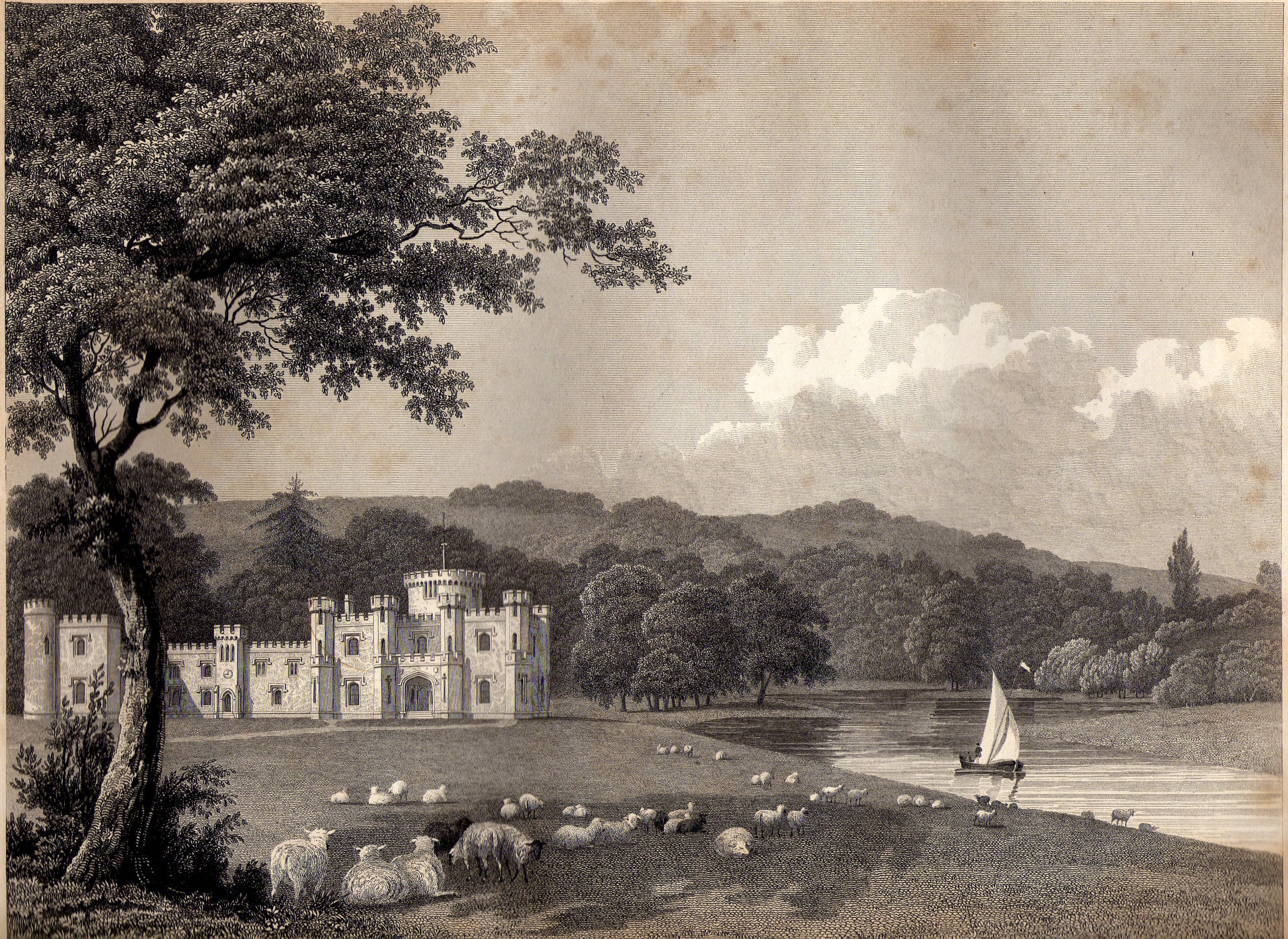
Knepp Castle House

Burrell built a country mansion near Knepp Castle, known by the same name, near West Grinstead, and purchased an estate at Boulton. He owned a house in Richmond Terrace, London, which was the subject of a court case in 1833 in which he argued that because the house was on the site of the former Palace of Whitehall, it was not liable to the poor rate of St. Margaret's, Westminster.

Burrell married Frances Wyndham, the illegitimate daughter of George Wyndham, 3rd Earl of Egremont, and Elizabeth Ilive, on 4 July 1808 at St. George's Church, Hanover Square. Their eldest son, Charles Wyndham Burrell, died aged seventeen, but his other sons, Percy and Walter, succeeded successively to the baronetcy and the seat of New Shoreham.

Parliament of the United Kingdom
Preceded by Sir Cecil Bisshopp; Timothy Shelley	Member of Parliament for New Shoreham; 1806–1862; With: Timothy Shelley 1806–1818; James Martin Lloyd 1818–1826; Henry Howard 1826–1832; Harry Goring 1832–1837; Charles Goring 1837–1849; Lord Alexander Gordon-Lennox 1849–1859; Sir Stephen Cave 1859–1862	Succeeded by Sir Percy Burrell, Bt; Sir Stephen Cave
Preceded by George Harcourt	Father of the House; 1861–1862	Succeeded by Henry Lowther
Baronetage of Great Britain
Preceded by William Burrell	Baronet; 1796–1862	Succeeded by Percy Burrell
