= Robert Booth (MP for New Shoreham) =

English politician

Robert Booth (fl. 1601) was an English politician.

He was a member (MP) of the parliament of England for New Shoreham in 1601.

Parliament of England
Preceded by William Necton; John Young	Member of Parliament for New Shoreham; 1601; With: John Morley	Succeeded by Bernard Whetstone; Sir Hugh Beeston
