= John Morley (disambiguation) =

John Morley (1838 – 1923), was a British Liberal statesman, writer and newspaper editor.

John Morley may also refer to:

== Politicians ==
- John Morley (15th century MP) for Lancashire
- John Morley (died 1565), MP for Lewes
- John Morley (died 1587), English MP for Wycombe and St Ives
- Sir John Morley (died 1622) (1572–1622), English MP for New Shoreham and Chichester
- John Morley (Vermont politician) (born 1970)

== Sportspeople ==
- John Morley (cricketer) (1838–1864), English cricketer
- John Morley (Gaelic footballer) (1942–1980)
- John Morley (rugby league) (fl. 1900s)
- Jack Morley (1909–1972), Welsh rugby player

== Others ==
- John David Morley (1948–2018), English writer

== See also ==
- John Parker, 1st Earl of Morley (1772–1840)
- John Parker, 6th Earl of Morley (1923–2015)
