= Hugh Beeston =

English politician (c. 1547-1626)

Sir Hugh Beeston (c. 1547 – February 1626) was an English politician who sat in the House of Commons at various times between 1589 and 1614.

Beeston was the second son of Sir George Beeston of Beeston and his first wife. Sir George baptised both his two eldest sons Hugh which leads to confusion. Hugh Beeston was awarded BA at Oxford University in 1563 and entered Lincoln's Inn in 1565. This is taken to be the younger Hugh who was deputy comptroller for Cheshire and Flintshire in 1585 and in 1589. It is likely that he was also the Member of Parliament for several constituencies that were open to court influence. In 1589, he was elected Member of Parliament for Bodmin. He was J.P. for Cheshire from about 1592. In 1593 he was elected MP for West Looe in 1593.

John Chamberlain mentioned that Hugh Beeston was involved in a fight with a Cheshire man called Sutton soon after the funeral of his father in 1601.

Beeston was granted the estate of Plas Cadwgan, Denbighshire after its owner, Edward Jones, was executed for involvement in the Babington Plot, and it became his main residence. By April 1595 he was receiver general of the revenue in the Exchequer for Cheshire and North Wales. He became JP for Denbighshire in 1596. In 1597 he was elected MP for Knaresborough and in 1601 he was elected MP for Winchelsea. He was knighted in 1603. In 1604 he was elected MP for New Shoreham. He succeeded to the estates of Beeston on the death of his brother in 1608. In 1614 he was elected MP for Liverpool.

Beeston died at the age of about 78. He had married Margaret Worth, widow of Philip Worth of Titherington and daughter of Roger Downes. They had two sons and a daughter.

Parliament of England
Preceded by Emmanuel Chamond; Brutus Browne	Member of Parliament for Bodmin; 1589; With: Emmanuel Chamond	Succeeded by Anthony Bennet; Richard Cannock
Preceded by Matthew Patteson; Robert Sanderson	Member of Parliament for West Looe; 1593; With: John Shelbury	Succeeded by Robert Hitcham; Sir Henry Lennard
Preceded by Samuel Foxe; Simon Willis	Member of Parliament for Knaresborough; 1597; With: William Slingsby	Succeeded by Henry Slingsby; William Slingsby
Preceded by Ralph Ewens; Thomas Colepeper	Member of Parliament for Winchelsea; 1601; With: Moyle Finch	Succeeded by Adam White; Thomas Unton
Preceded by John Morley; Robert Booth	Member of Parliament for New Shoreham; 1604–1611; With: Sir Bernard Whetstone	Succeeded by Lord Howard of Effingham; Thomas Shelley
Preceded by Giles Brook; Thomas Remchinge	Member of Parliament for Liverpool; 1614; With: Thomas Ireland	Succeeded by Thomas May; William Johnson
