= Marlott =

Marlott may refer to:

- A fictional village in the Thomas Hardy novel Tess of the d'Urbervilles
  - Marnhull, a village in Dorset, England, on which the fictional village was based
- William Marlott (1574–1646), English politician, MP for New Shoreham

== See also ==
- Marlot, a cat hybrid
