= Percy Burrell =

British politician

Sir Percy Burrell, 4th Baronet DL, JP (10 February 1812 – 19 July 1876) was a British Conservative politician.

== Background ==
Born at Grosvenor Place, London, he was the second son of Sir Charles Burrell, 3rd Baronet and his wife Frances Wyndham, an illegitimate daughter of George Wyndham, 3rd Earl of Egremont. Burrell was educated at Westminster School and Christ Church, Oxford, where he matriculated in 1830. He served in the British Army and was captain of the 18th Sussex Rifle Volunteers.

== Career ==
In 1862, he succeeded his father as baronet. He entered the British House of Commons in the same year, sitting for New Shoreham, the constituency his father had also represented before, until his death in 1876. He was a Deputy Lieutenant and justice of the peace of Sussex.

== Family ==
On 26 August 1856, he married Henrietta Katherine Brooke-Pechell, daughter of Vice-Admiral Sir George Brooke-Pechell, 4th Baronet at St George's, Hanover Square in London. Their marriage was childless. Burrell died, aged 64, at Belgrave Square in London. He was succeeded in the baronetcy by his younger brother Walter.

Parliament of the United Kingdom
Preceded by Sir Charles Burrell, Bt; Sir Stephen Cave	Member of Parliament for New Shoreham; 1862 – 1876; With: Sir Stephen Cave	Succeeded by Sir Walter Burrell, Bt; Sir Stephen Cave
Baronetage of Great Britain
Preceded by Charles Burrell	Baronet (of Valentine House); 1862 – 1876	Succeeded by Walter Burrell
