= John Morley (died 1622) =

English politician

Sir John Morley (c. 1572 – December 1622) of Halnaker, Sussex was an English politician who sat in the House of Commons at various times between 1601 and 1622.

== Life ==
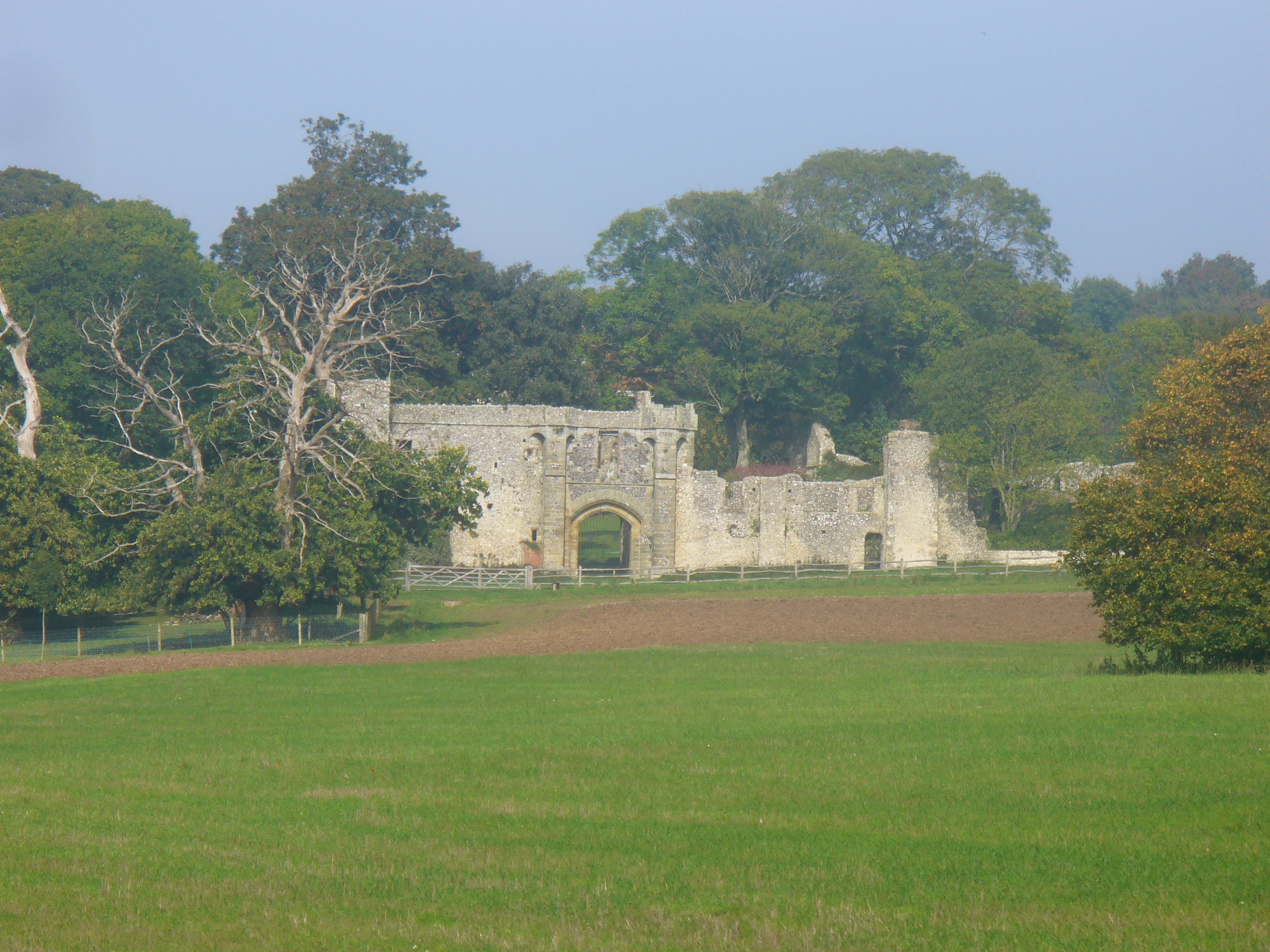
Ruins of Halnaker House, West Sussex

Morley was the son of wealthy merchant John Morley of Halnaker and London. He was educated at Christ Church, Oxford in 1586 and entered Inner Temple in 1587. He succeeded to the estate of Halnaker on the death of his father in 1587 and added to the estate by purchase. In 1601, he was elected Member of Parliament for New Shoreham and knighted on 23 July 1603. In 1604 he was elected MP for Chichester and re-elected in 1614. In 1621 he was elected MP for New Shoreham again.

Morley died at the age of about 50 between 21 and 27 December 1622. He had married Cicely Caryll, daughter of Sir Edward Caryll of Harting; they had two sons and two daughters.

Parliament of England
Preceded by William Necton; John Young	Member of Parliament for New Shoreham; 1601; With: Robert Booth	Succeeded by Sir Bernard Whetstone; Sir Hugh Beeston
Preceded by Adrian Stoughton; Stephen Barnham	Member of Parliament for Chichester; 1604–1614; With: Adrian Stoughton	Succeeded by Sir Edward Cecil; Thomas Whatman
Preceded by Lord Howard of Effingham; Thomas Shelley	Member of Parliament for New Shoreham; 1621–1622; With: Sir John Leedes	Succeeded by Anthony Stapley; William Marlott
