= Sir Walter Burrell, 5th Baronet =

British barrister, Conservative politician and Freemason

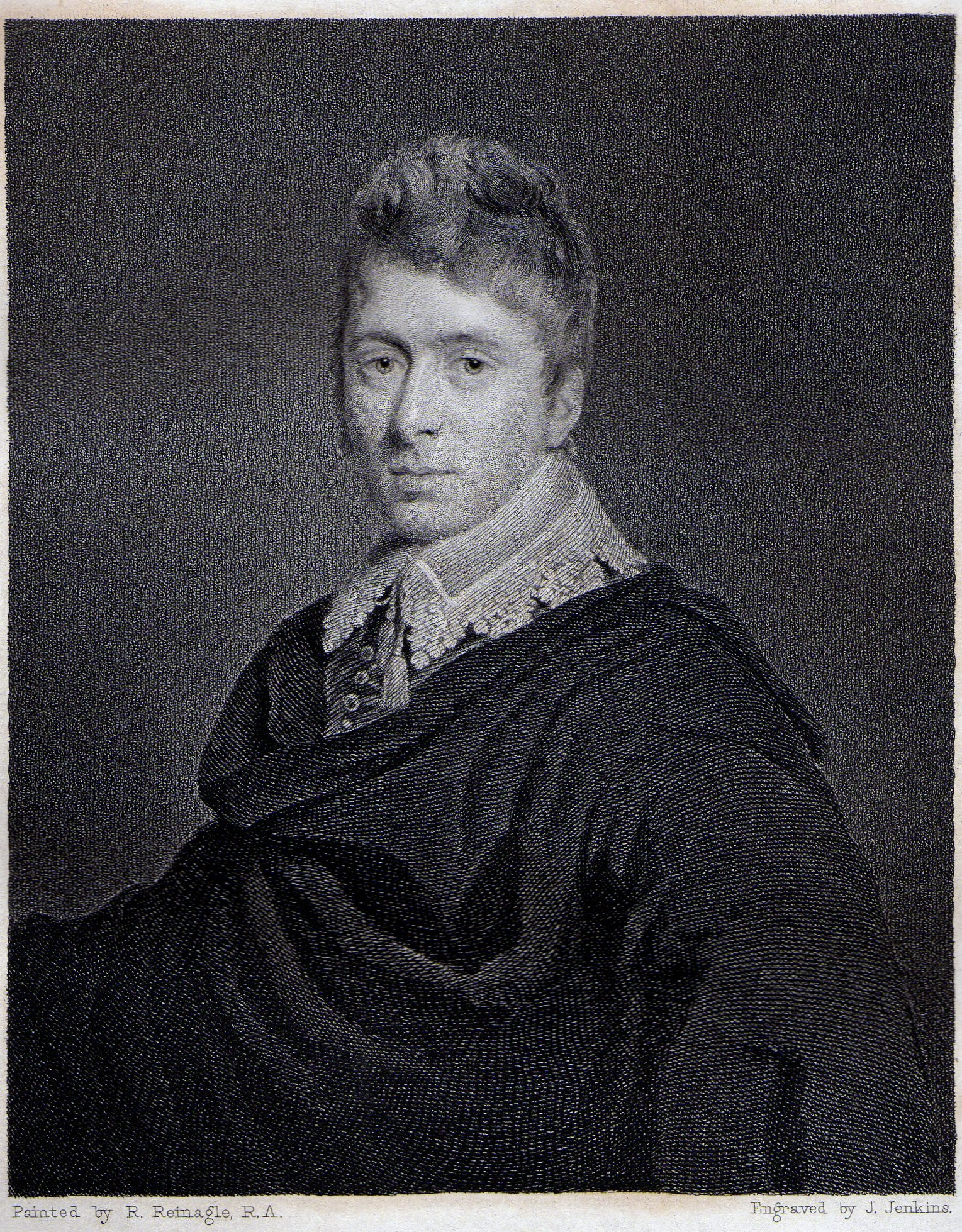
Engraving of Walter Burrell, published 1835 in The History, Antiquities and Topography of the County of Sussex by Thomas Walker Horsfield

Sir Walter Wyndham Burrell, 5th Baronet JP (26 October 1814 – 24 January 1886) was a British barrister, Conservative politician and Freemason.

== Background ==
He was the third son of Sir Charles Burrell, 3rd Baronet and his wife Frances Wyndham, a daughter of George Wyndham, 3rd Earl of Egremont. Burrell was called to the bar at Lincoln's Inn in 1840. He served in the British Army and was an officer in the 2nd Sussex Rifle Volunteers. From 1877, Burrell was Grand Master of the Provincial Grand Lodge of Sussex.

== Career ==
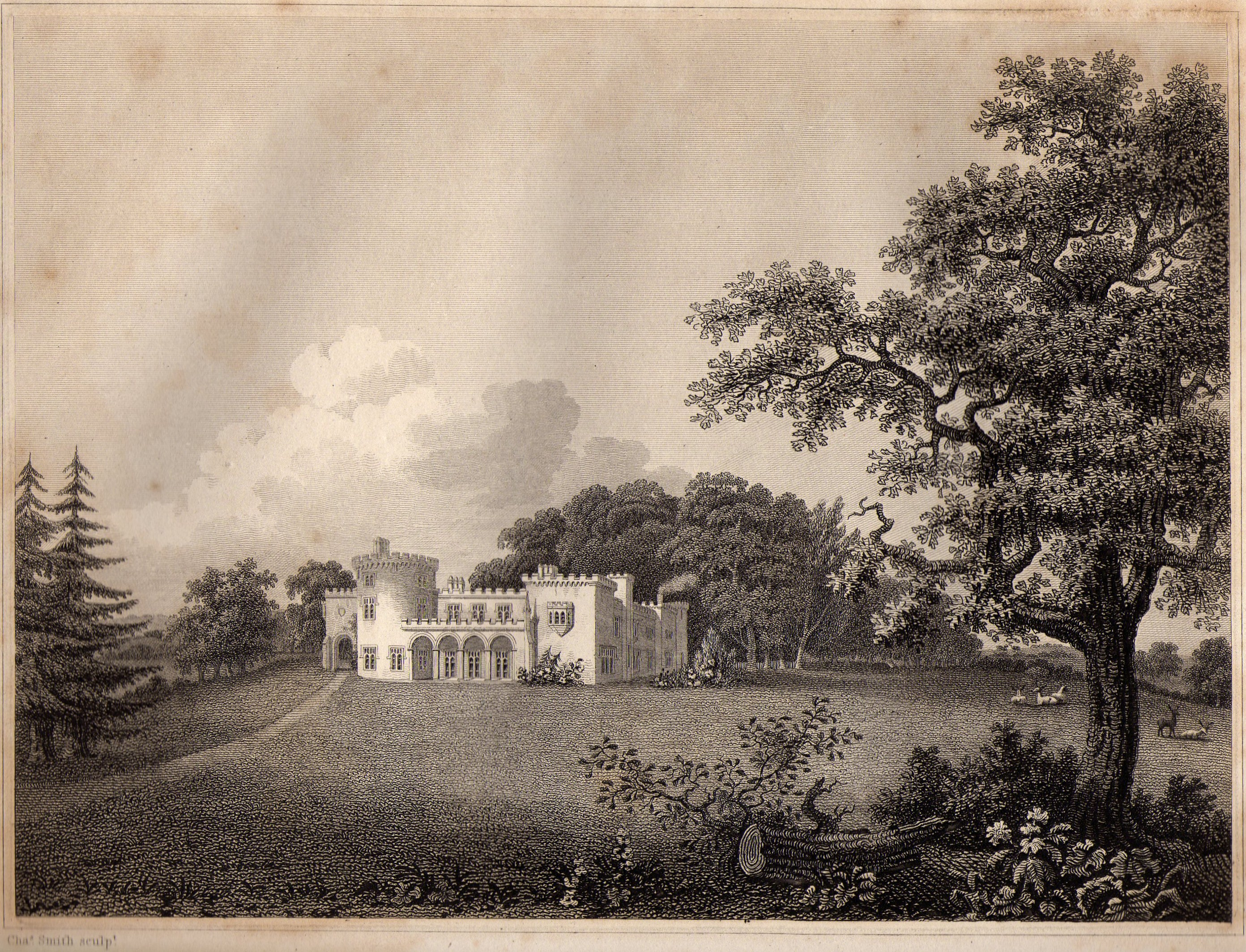
Engraving of West Grinstead Park near West Grinstead, West Sussex, published 1835 in The History, Antiquities and Topography of the County of Sussex by Thomas Walker Horsfield.

In 1865, Burrell contested East Sussex unsuccessfully. He succeeded his older brother Percy as baronet in 1876 and entered the British House of Commons in the same year, sitting for New Shoreham, the constituency his father and brother had also represented before, until its abolishment in 1885. Burrell was High Sheriff of Sussex in 1871.

== Family ==
On 10 June 1847, he married Dorothea Jones, youngest daughter of Reverend John Applethwaite Jones, at St James's Church, Piccadilly. They had four daughters and two sons: oldest son Charles Raymond Burrell married Etheldreda Mary, daughter of Sir Robert Loder, 1st Bt. Burrell died aged 71, at West Grinstead Park and was buried at Shipley, Sussex. He was succeeded in the baronetcy by his son Charles.

Parliament of the United Kingdom
Preceded by Sir Percy Burrell, 4th Bt; Sir Stephen Cave	Member of Parliament for New Shoreham; 1876 – 1885; With: Sir Stephen Cave 1876–1880; Robert Loder 1880–1885	Constituency abolished
Baronetage of Great Britain
Preceded by Percy Burrell	Baronet (of Valentine House); 1876 – 1886	Succeeded by Charles Raymond Burrell
