= Richard Alvey (priest) =

Richard Alvey (died 1584) was an English clergyman, known as the master of the Temple Church.

== Life ==
Alvey received his education at Cambridge University, where he graduated B.A. in 1529–30, and M.A. in 1533. He was admitted a fellow of St. John's College, Cambridge, in 1537 or 1538 during the prefecture of Dr. George Day. On 24 February 1540 he was presented by his college to the rectory of Thorington in Essex. He proceeded B.D. in 1543, was admitted to the rectory of Grinstead (modern Greenstead), near Colchester, on the king's presentation, 11 May 1546, and to the rectory of Sandon, also in Essex, on the presentation of Sir John Gate, 13 November 1548. On 11 December 1552 he was installed canon of Westminster Abbey.

Early in the reign of Queen Mary he was deprived of all his preferments. He went into exile, residing at Frankfurt till after the accession of Queen Elizabeth. He returned to England and was restored to the rectory of Thorington. By letters-patent dated 13 February 1560 he was appointed master of the Temple, and he was again made one of the canons of Westminster by the charter of refoundation, 21 June 1560. In 1565 he resigned the rectory of Thorington. Edwin Sandys, Bishop of London, collated him to the rectory of Bursted Parva, Essex, on 10 April 1571. He resigned his canonry at Westminster in 1575, and the rectory of Bursted Parva in the following year. His death occurred about August 1584. His successor was Richard Hooker.
