= Robert Benefeld =

English politician

Robert Benefeld (fl. 1414–1448) was an English politician. He sat as MP for New Shoreham in November 1414.

He was probably the son of Simon Benefeld.
