= Simon Iveny =

English politician

Simon Iveny (fl. 1304–1305) was an English politician.

He was a member (MP) of the parliament of England for New Shoreham in 1304–05.

Parliament of England
Preceded by Henry de Burne; Roger de Beauchamp	Member of Parliament for New Shoreham; 1304–05; With: Richard Serle	Succeeded by Richard Must; Richard Serle
