= Mody =

Mody may refer to:

- Maturity-onset diabetes of the young (MODY)
- Hormusjee Naorojee Mody
- William Mody, MP
