= Richard Bernard (disambiguation) =

Richard Bernard (1568–1641) was an English Puritan clergyman and writer.

Richard Bernard may also refer to:

- Richard Bernard (MP for New Shoreham) (fl. 1377–1395), English MP for New Shoreham
- Richard Bernard (Dean of Leighlin) (1787–1850), MP for Bandon Bridge and dean
- Richard Bernard (cricketer) (1938–1998), English cricketer
- Richard Bernard (composer) (unknown dates), classical composer
- Dick Bernard (Richard Bernard, 1917–2012), Scottish lawn bowler
