= Leonard West =

Leonard West may refer to:

- Leonard West (politician) (by 1518–1578), English politician
- Leonard West (rugby union) (1879–1945), Scottish rugby union player
