= 1874 New Shoreham by-election =

UK Parliamentary by-election

The 1874 New Shoreham by-election was held on 13 March 1874. The by-election was fought due to the incumbent Conservative MP, Stephen Cave, becoming Judge Advocate General, as it was common practice at the time to vacate a seat in being appointed to cabinet. Cave retained his seat without a challenger.
