= Richard de Bokyngeham =

English politician

Richard de Bokyngeham (fl. 1300–1301) was an English politician.

He was a member (MP) of the parliament of England for New Shoreham in 1300–01.

Parliament of England
Preceded by Godfrey atte Curt; Roger le Wake	Member of Parliament for New Shoreham; 1300–1301; With: Roger de Beauchamp	Succeeded by Henry de Burne; Roger de Beauchamp
