= Alexander Gordon-Lennox =

Alexander Gordon-Lennox is the name of:

- Sir Alexander Gordon-Lennox (Royal Navy officer) (1911–1987), admiral of the Royal Navy
- Lord Alexander Gordon-Lennox (1825–1892), British Conservative politician
