= Henry de Burne =

14th-century English politician

Henry de Burne (fl. 1300–01) was an English politician.

He was a member (MP) of the parliament of England for New Shoreham in 1300–01.

Parliament of England
Preceded by Roger de Beauchamp; Richard de Bokyngeham	Member of Parliament for New Shoreham; 1300–01; With: Roger de Beauchamp	Succeeded by Richard Serle; Simon Iveny
