= William Vyvyan =

William Vyvyan (fl. 1325), was an English Member of Parliament (MP).

He was a Member of the Parliament of England for New Shoreham in 1325.

Parliament of England
Preceded by John Loute; John Baudefait	Member of Parliament for New Shoreham; 1325; With: Thomas Moraunt	Succeeded by Ralph Bovet; John le Blake
