= Charles Goring (1743–1829) =

British country landowner and politician

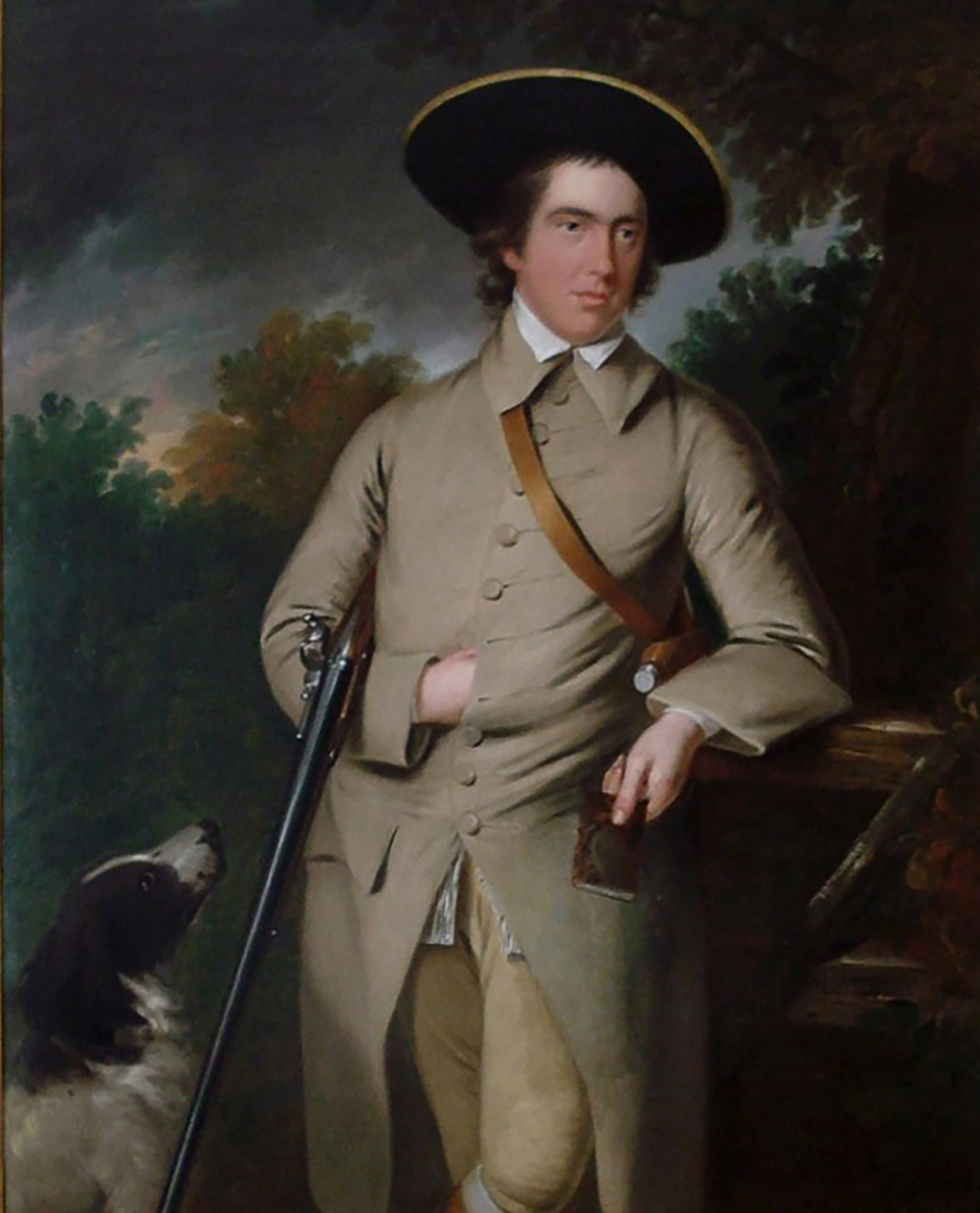
Charles Goring, portrait around 1765

Charles Goring (1743–1829) was a British country landowner and politician who sat in the House of Commons from 1774 to 1780.

Goring was the second son of Sir Charles Matthew Goring, 5th Baronet and his second wife Elizabeth Fagge, daughter of Sir Robert Fagge, 3rd Baronet, of Wiston. He matriculated at Magdalen College, Oxford on 27 March 1762, aged 18.

His father died in 1769 and the property near Shoreham, which Goring inherited through his mother, increased his political influence in the West of Sussex . The Goring family had represented various Sussex constituencies in Parliament.

In the 1774 general election Goring stood as Member of Parliament for New Shoreham and topped the poll. The constituency had been enlarged in 1771 by an Act which enfranchised about 1200 freeholders. In Parliament he voted with the opposition and is only known to have made one speech. He decided not to stand again in 1780.

Goring was married three times. His first wife was Sarah Beard, daughter of Ralph Beard of Hurstpierpoint, Sussex whom he married on 20 April 1779. She died on 6 December 1797. He married secondly Elizabeth Luxford, daughter of Edward Luxford on 7 June 1798. She died on 8 August 1811. He married thirdly, Mary Ballard, daughter of Rev. John Ballard, rector of Great Longford, Wiltshire on 7 May 1812.

Goring died 3 December 1829 aged 86. He is buried in Wiston, West Sussex and his monument was sculpted by Francis Chantrey.

The Gentleman's Magazine described him as "a singular specimen of an old English gentleman ... of a hearty vigorous constitution and great hospitality". He had three daughters by his second wife Elizabeth, and had two sons Charles and John and a daughter Mary by his third wife Mary. His son Charles was later MP for New Shoreham.

Parliament of Great Britain
Preceded by Peregrine Cust; Thomas Rumbold	Member of Parliament for New Shoreham; 1774–1780; With: Sir John Shelley	Succeeded by Sir Cecil Bisshopp; John Peachey
