= John Alford (Parliamentarian) =

John Alford (c. 1590 – 5 January 1649) was an English landowner and politician who sat in the House of Commons in two periods between 1626 and 1648. He supported the Parliamentarian side in the English Civil War.

== Early life ==
Alford was the son of Edward Alford of Offington and his wife Judith Downing, daughter of Sir Edward Downing. He matriculated at St John's College, Oxford, on 13 February 1607 aged 16.

== Political career ==
In 1626 Alford was elected Member of Parliament for New Shoreham and in 1628 was elected MP for Arundel until 1629 when King Charles decided to rule without parliament for eleven years. The manors of Hamsey and Offington both came into his possession on the death of his father in 1632.

In April 1640, Alford was re-elected MP for New Shoreham in the Short Parliament and again in November 1640 for the Long Parliament and held the seat until 1648 when he was excluded in Pride's Purge.

== Death ==
Alford died in 1649 and was buried at Broadwater, West Sussex where a monument in the South Transept Chapel was erected to his memory.

"Here lyeth the body of the truly honourable and religious John Alford of Offington, Esquire, who having finished his career, exchanged mortality for glory, Jan. 5, 1648. AEt. 59. "He left issue ye noble Lady Jane Eversfield, and the virtuous gentele woman Mrs. Elizabeth Alford."

Alford married Frances Bishopp, daughter of Sir Thomas Bishopp, 1st Baronet, of Parham, Sussex, M.P., and had two daughters Elizabeth, born 1620, who married Mr. Bickerstaff, and was Jane, who married Sir Thomas Eversfield. His widow outlived him for eleven years.

Parliament of England
Preceded by Anthony Stapley; William Marlott	Member of Parliament for New Shoreham; 1626; With: William Marlott	Succeeded by William Marlott; Robert Morley
Preceded by Nicholas Jordain; William Mills	Member of Parliament for Arundel; 1628–1629; With: Henry Lord Maltravers	Parliament suspended until 1640
Vacant Parliament suspended since 1629	Member of Parliament for New Shoreham; 1640–1648; With: William Marlott 1640–1646; Herbert Springet 1646–1648	Not represented after Pride's Purge
