= Edward Blaker =

English politician

Edward Blaker (10 January 1630 – 13 September 1678) was an English politician who sat in the House of Commons from 1660 to 1678.

Blaker was the son of Edward Blaker of Buckinghams, Shoreham, and his wife Susanna Scrase, daughter of Tuppen Scrase, of Blatchington. He was admitted student of the Inner Temple in November 1647. In 1657 he was High Sheriff of Sussex.

Blaker was elected Member of Parliament (MP) for New Shoreham in the Third Protectorate Parliament of 1659. He was re-elected in 1660 and held the seat until 1678.

Blaker died in September 1678, aged 48.

Blaker married Dorothy Goring, daughter of Henry Goring of Heydown.

Parliament of England
Preceded by Not represented	Member of Parliament for New Shoreham; 1659; With: John Whaley	Succeeded by Not represented in restored Rump Parliament
Preceded by Not represented in restored Rump Parliament	Member of Parliament for New Shoreham; 1660–1678; With: John Whaley; Sir Herbert Springet, Bt; William Quatremaine; Sir John Fagg, Bt; Henry Goring	Succeeded by Henry Goring; Anthony Dean
