= Sir Harry Goring, 6th Baronet =

English politician

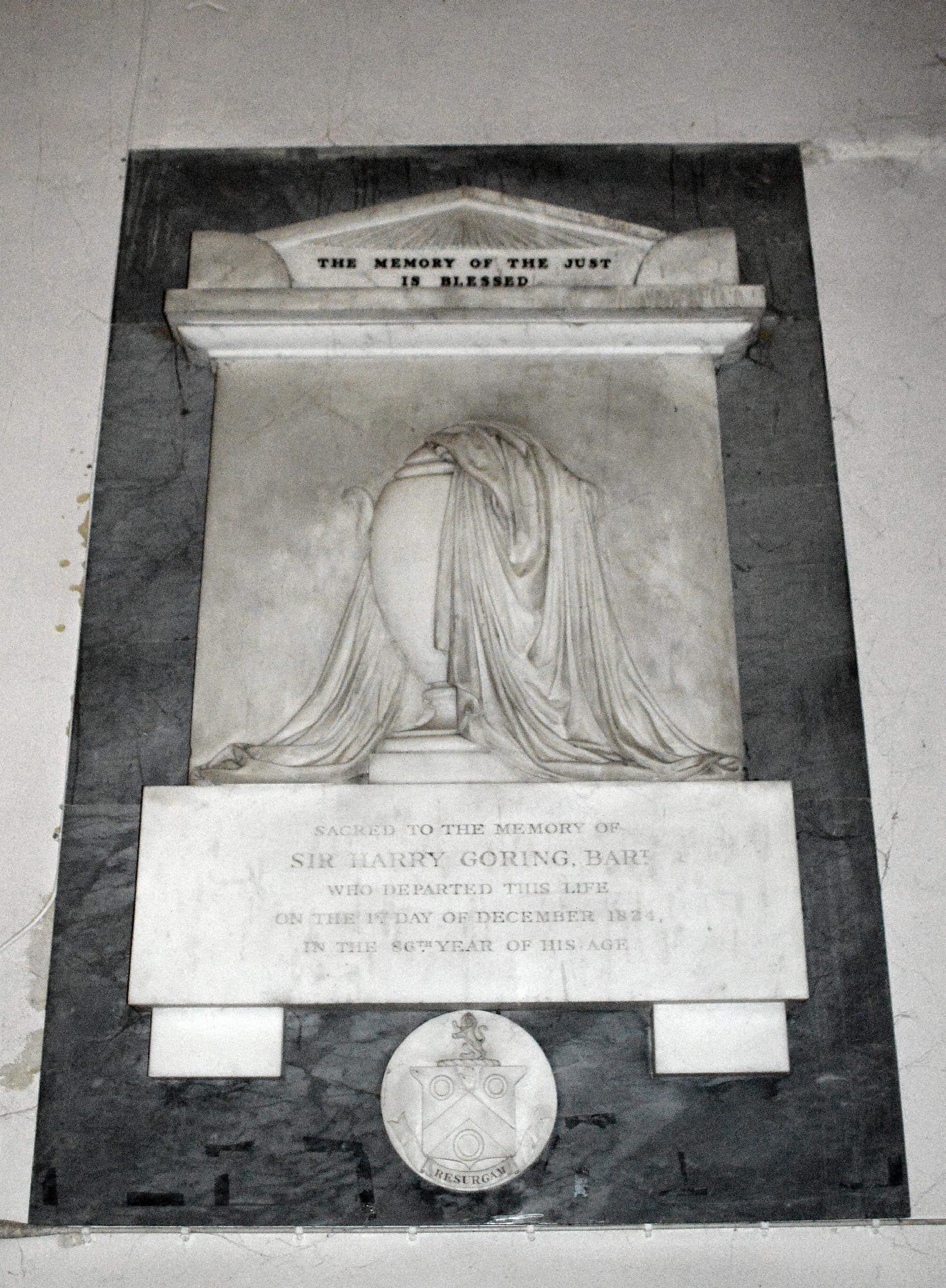
Memorial in St Mary's church, Washington, Sussex

Sir Harry Goring, 6th baronet (1739–1824), of Highden, near Washington, Sussex, was an English politician.

He was a member (MP) of the parliament of Great Britain for New Shoreham 1790–1796.

Baronetage of England
Preceded by Charles Mathew Goring	Baronet (of Highden); 1769–1824	Succeeded by Charles Foster Goring
