= John Loute =

English politician

John Loute (fl. 1319) was an English politician.

He was a member (MP) of the parliament of England for New Shoreham in 1319.

Parliament of England
Preceded by Henry de Bourne; William de Pevense	Member of Parliament for New Shoreham; 1319; With: John Baudefait	Succeeded by William Vyvyan; Thomas Moraunt
