= Godfrey atte Curt =

13th-century English politician

Godfrey atte Curt (fl. 1298) was an English Member of Parliament (MP).

He was a Member of the Parliament of England for New Shoreham in 1298.

Parliament of England
Preceded by Roger de Beauchamp; Thomas Pontoyse	Member of Parliament for New Shoreham; 1298; With: Roger le Wake	Succeeded by Roger de Beauchamp; Richard de Bokyngeham
