= William Hulle (MP for New Shoreham) =

English politician

William Hulle (fl. 1397) of Lancing, West Sussex, was an English politician.

He was a Member (MP) of the Parliament of England for New Shoreham in September 1397.
