= Charles Goring (1817–1849) =

British Conservative politician and cricketer

Member of Parliament for New Shoreham
- In office 3 July 1841 – 19 April 1849 Serving with Charles Burrell
- Preceded by: Charles Burrell; Harry Goring
- Succeeded by: Charles Burrell; Alexander Gordon-Lennox

Personal details
- Born: 14 July 1817
- Died: 17 November 1849 (aged 32)
- Party: Conservative
- Spouse: Juliana Mary Caroline Dixie (m. 1849)

Charles Goring (14 July 1817 – 17 November 1849) was a British Conservative politician and first-class cricketer.

Goring was the son of Charles Goring (1744–1797) and Mary née Ballard, and brother of John Goring (born 1824). He was educated at Winchester College, and matriculated at Christ Church, Oxford in 1835. He graduated B.A. there in 1843, and M.A. in 1847. While studying at Oxford, he played first-class cricket for Oxford University from 1836 to 1838, making four appearances.

Goring was elected Conservative Member of Parliament for New Shoreham at the 1841 general election and held the seat until his death in 1849. He married Juliana Mary Caroline Dixie, daughter of Sir William Willoughy Wolstan Dixie, 7th Baronet on 19 September 1849, but died two months later. His brother, William Goring, was also a first-class cricketer.

Parliament of the United Kingdom
Preceded by Charles Burrell; Harry Goring	Member of Parliament for New Shoreham; 1841–1849; With: Charles Burrell	Succeeded by Charles Burrell; Alexander Gordon-Lennox
