= John Michell (MP for New Shoreham) =

16th-century English politician

John Michell (by 1491 – 15 October 1546) was an English politician.

== Family ==
He was the brother of the MP, Thomas Michell.

== Career ==
He was a member (MP) of the parliament of England for New Shoreham in 1529.
