= Thomas Pontoyse =

13th-century English politician

Thomas Pontoyse (fl. 1295) was an English Member of Parliament (MP).

He was a Member of the Parliament of England for New Shoreham in 1295.

Parliament of England
Preceded by ? ?	Member of Parliament (MP) for New Shoreham; 1295; With: Roger de Beauchamp	Succeeded by Godfrey atte Curt; Roger le Wake
