= Roger le Wake =

13th-century English politician

Roger le Wake (fl. 1298) was an English Member of Parliament (MP).

He was a Member of the Parliament of England for New Shoreham in 1298.

Parliament of England
Preceded by Roger de Beauchamp; Thomas Pontoyse	Member of Parliament for New Shoreham; 1298; With: Godfrey atte Curt	Succeeded by Roger de Beauchamp; Richard de Bokyngeham
