= Gregory Fromond =

English politician

Gregory Fromond (fl. 1380–1397) of Shoreham, Sussex was an English politician.

He was a member (MP) of the parliament of England for New Shoreham in January 1380 and September 1397.
