= William Quatremaine =

English physician and politician

William Quatremaine or Quatremain (c. 1618 – 11 June 1667) was an English physician who served King Charles II in exile and a politician who sat in the House of Commons from 1662 to 1667.

Quatremaine was educated at Pembroke College, Oxford, and on 23 June 1657 took the degree of Doctor of Physic. At the beginning of 1658 he helped the Marquis of Ormonde return to France after the Marquis had made a secret journey to England on behalf of the King. Ormonde recommended Quatremain to Sir Edward Hyde in very strong terms and as a result Quatremaine went to Flanders to be physician to King Charles II. After the restoration, he practiced in Lewes after marrying into a Sussex family. In 1661 he was elected to the Royal Society.

Quatremaine was elected Member of Parliament (MP) for New Shoreham in 1662 and held the seat until his death in 1667.

Parliament of England
Preceded by Sir Herbert Springet, Bt; Edward Blaker	Member of Parliament for New Shoreham; 1662–1667; With: Edward Blaker	Succeeded by Sir John Fagg, Bt; Edward Blaker
