= 1876 New Shoreham by-election =

UK Parliamentary by-election

The 1876 New Shoreham by-election was fought on 4 August 1876. The by-election was fought due to the death of the incumbent Conservative MP, Percy Burrell. It was won by the Conservative candidate Walter Burrell.
