= Bernard Whetstone =

English politician

Sir Bernard Whetstone (c. 1547 – 1624) of Woodford, Essex and Hangleton, Sussex was an English landowner, who sat in the House of Commons in the parliament of 1604–1611.

== Life ==
He was the son of Robert Whetstone (d. 1557), Haberdasher, a London haberdasher and Margaret, daughter of Philip Bernard of Great Yarmouth, Norfolk, and co-heiress to her brother Francis Bernard. He was the older brother of George Whetstone. His father acquired the manor of Woodford in 1553. He matriculated at St John's College, Cambridge in 1563 and was admitted to Gray's Inn in 1580.

He accompanied Leicester's army to The Netherlands and was awarded an augmentation to his coat of arms for his valour at the battle of Zutphen.

He increased his estate through his marriages. His first wife was Elizabeth, daughter and co-heiress of John Calibut of Castle Acre, Norfolk. His second wife Anne was the widow of Giles Paulet, a younger son of the Marquis of Winchester. It was after this second marriage that he was made a JP in Essex. Finally in 1597 he married Mary, daughter of Richard Whalley of Kirton, Nottinghamshire and widow of Richard Bellingham of Hangleton. The couple conveyed their interest in Hangleton to Thomas Sackville, 1st Earl of Dorset, but remained as tenants of the manor house and he became a JP in Sussex. He was knighted in 1603.

In 1604 he was chosen to sit for the nearby parliamentary seat of New Shoreham, where Charles Howard, 1st Earl of Nottingham was patron, his stepson being the earl's secretary. He was moderately active as an MP; he sat on a number of committees and two of his speeches were recorded in the first session.

Parliament of England
| Preceded by Lord Howard of Effingham; Thomas Shelley | Member of Parliament for New Shoreham; 1604-1611; With: Sir Hugh Beeston | Succeeded by John Morley; Robert Booth |
