= John Skully =

English politician

John Skully (fl. 1388–1407), of Shoreham-by-Sea, Sussex, was an English politician.

He was a member (MP) of the parliament of England for New Shoreham in October 1382, September 1388, 1391, 1393 and 1407.
