= Robert Morley (died 1632) =

English merchant and politician

Robert Morley (died 1632) was an English merchant and politician who sat in the House of Commons at various times between 1621 and 1629.

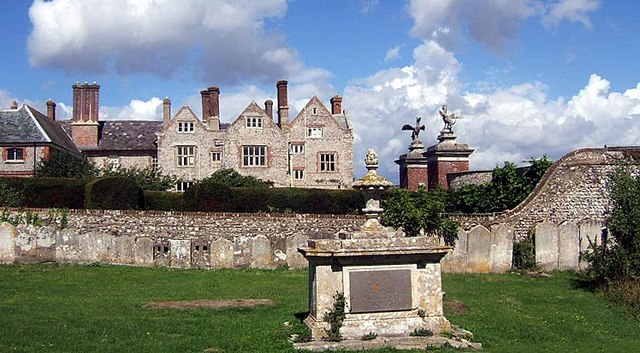
Glynde Place

Morley was the son of William Morley of Glynde Place and his wife Margaret Robarts, daughter of William Robarts of Warbleton. He was a citizen of the City of London and a member of the Worshipful Company of Skinners.

In 1621, Morley was elected Member of Parliament for Bramber and was re-elected MP for Bramber in 1624. Also on 27 May 1625 Morley became an alderman for Dowgate in the City of London. He was elected MP for New Shoreham in 1628 and sat until 1629 when King Charles decided to rule without parliament for eleven years. Morley was High Sheriff of Sussex and High Sheriff of Surrey in 1631.

Morley married in 1614, Susanna Hodgson, daughter and heiress of Thomas Hodgson, of Framfield.

Parliament of England
Preceded by Sir John Leeds; Henry Shelley	Member of Parliament for Bramber; 1621–1624; With: (Sir) Thomas Bowyer	Succeeded by (Sir) Thomas Bowyer; Walter Barttelot
Preceded by John Alford; William Marlott	Member of Parliament for New Shoreham; 1628–1629; With: William Marlott	Parliament suspended until 1640
