= John Weston (footballer) =

English footballer

Personal information
- Full name: John Matthew Weston
- Date of birth: 19 October 1900
- Place of birth: Dudley, England
- Date of death: 1984 (aged 83–84)
- Position: Winger

Senior career*
Years	Team	Apps	(Gls)
1927–1928	Burnley	2	(1)
1928–1932	Northampton Town	45	(15)
- Shelbourne
- * Club domestic league appearances and goals

John Matthew Weston (19 October 1900 – 1984) was an English professional footballer. He played as a winger, initially for Burnley, from 1928 to 1932, then for Northampton Town, and lastly for Shelbourne Football Club.
