= William Marlott =

English politician

William Marlott (May 1574 – February 1646) of Shoreham was an English politician who sat in the House of Commons between 1625 and 1646. He supported the Parliamentarian side in the English Civil War.

Marlott was born in Sussex, the son of Thomas Marlott and his wife Dorothy Stapley.

In 1624 Marlott was elected Member of Parliament for New Shoreham and held the seat until 1629 when King Charles decided to rule without parliament for eleven years. In April 1640, he was re-elected MP for New Shoreham in the Short Parliament and again in November 1640 for the Long Parliament and held the seat until his death in 1646. Marlott was absent on a call of the House on 5 February 1644, being on service of the Parliament. He took the Covenant on 27 March 1644.

Marlott died in 1646 and was buried on 8 February 1646 at Shoreham by Sea .

Parliament of England
Preceded by Sir John Leedes; Sir John Morley	Member of Parliament for New Shoreham; 1624–1629; With: Anthony Stapley 1625; John Alford 1626; Robert Morley 1628–1629	Parliament suspended until 1640
Vacant Parliament suspended since 1629	Member of Parliament for New Shoreham; 1640–1646; With: John Alford	Succeeded by John Alford; Herbert Springet
