= John Morley (died 1587) =

Member of the Parliament of England

John Morley (died 14 November 1587) was an English politician who sat in the House of Commons from 1584 to 1586.

Morley was of Saxham, Suffolk. He was an official in the Star Chamber from 7 July 1565. By 1568 he was joint surveyor of customs on cloth and wines. He became engrosser of the great roll and Clerk of the Pipe in July 1579. His offices made him wealthy and he purchased lands at Halnaker, Sussex. In 1584, he was elected Member of Parliament for Wycombe. He was elected MP for St Ives in 1586.

Morley married Elizabeth Wotton, daughter of Edward Wotton, MD. They had three sons including John who was also an MP.

Parliament of England
Preceded by Thomas Nale; Rowland Goules	Member of Parliament for Wycombe; 1584; With: George Cawfield	Succeeded by Thomas Ridley; George Fleetwood
Preceded by John James; Charles Blount	Member of Parliament for St Ives; 1586; With: Thomas Colby	Succeeded by Maurice Steward; Henry Hobart
