= William Mody =

16th-century English politician

William Mody (by 1524 – 1558 or later) was an English politician.

He was a member (MP) of the parliament of England for New Shoreham in April and November 1554.
