= Edward Fenner =

English judge

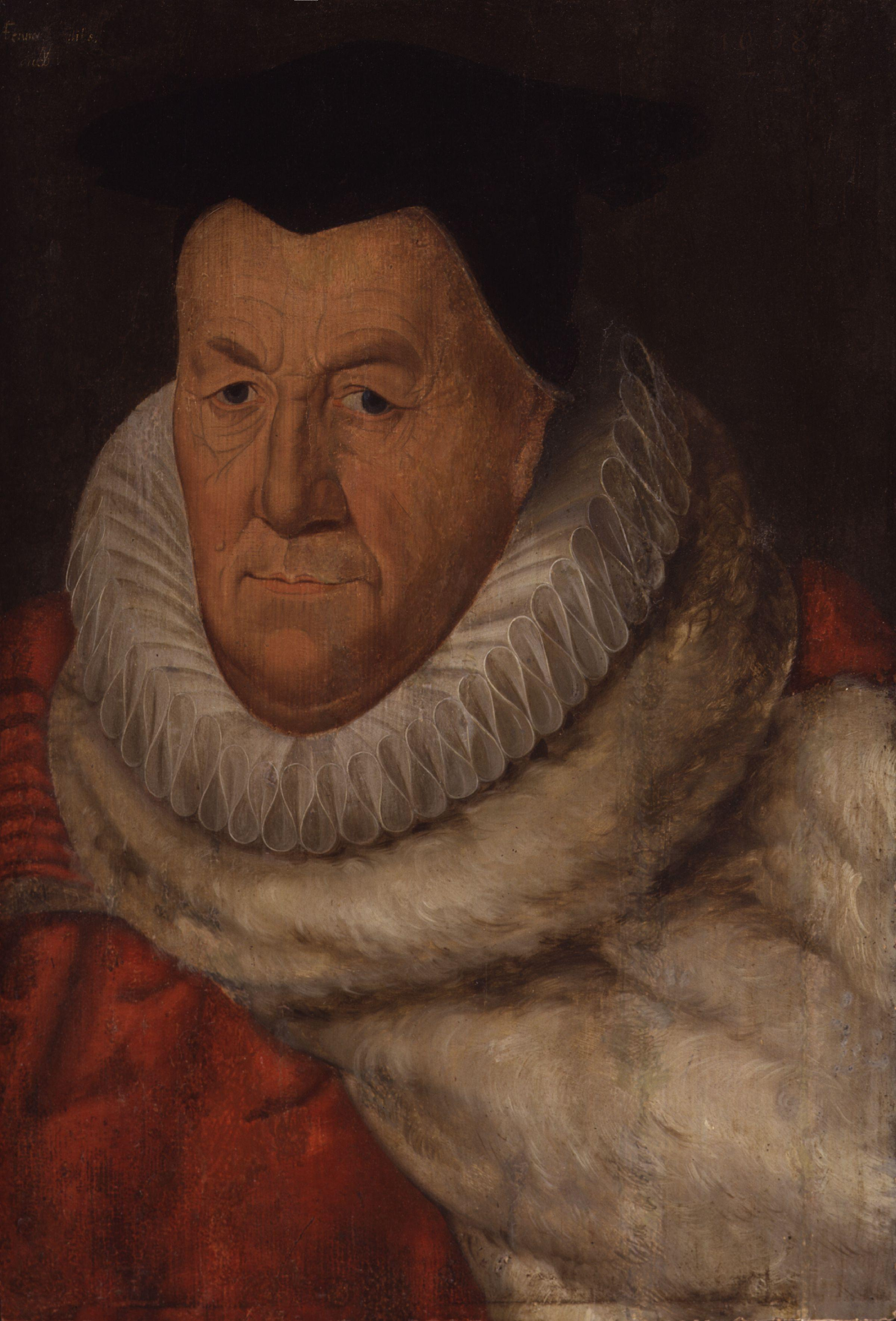
Sir Edward Fenner, by unknown artist

Edward Fenner (died 1612) was an English judge.

Fenner was the son of John Fenner of Crawley, Sussex, by Ellen, daughter of Sir William Goring of Burton, was called to the bar at the Middle Temple, and was reader in the autumn of 1576. He was M.P. for Lewes in 1571 and Shoreham in 1572. He became a serjeant in Michaelmas term 1577, and enjoyed a large practice. He was appointed a judge of the King's Bench on 26 May 1590, and was justice of the peace for Surrey. Though not a prominent member of the court, he was in the commission upon several state trials, and, before becoming a judge, was present as a justice of the peace at the trial of John Udall, January 1590.

In 1593 he tried three witches in Huntingdonshire, and a pamphlet account of this trial was published. In January 1608 he received a grant of an annuity of 50 pounds during the time his services on circuit were discontinued. He died 23 January 1612, and was buried at St Mary the Virgin Church, Hayes in Middlesex. He had one son, Edward, who died without issue in 1615.
