= New Shoreham (constituency) =

- Former borough constituency for the House of Commons
- County: Sussex (now West Sussex)
- Major settlements: Shoreham-by-Sea

1295–1885
- Seats: Two
- Replaced by: Lewes

New Shoreham, sometimes simply called Shoreham, was a parliamentary borough centred on the town of Shoreham-by-Sea in what is now West Sussex. It returned two Members of Parliament (MPs) to the House of Commons of England from 1295 to 1707, then to the House of Commons of Great Britain until 1800, and finally to the House of Commons of the Parliament of the United Kingdom from 1801 until it was abolished by the Redistribution of Seats Act 1885, with effect from the 1885 general election.

A modern constituency called Shoreham existed from 1974 to 1997.

== Boundaries, franchise and boundary changes ==
New Shoreham is a part of Shoreham-by-Sea, located around its port. The borough, in 1800, had about 1,000 electors. The qualification for the vote before 1832, unusually for a borough, was the possession of a 40 shilling freehold which was the normal franchise for a county constituency.

The explanation for the franchise qualification was the result of a disputed by-election in 1770. At that time all the electors qualified by paying scot and lot, a local property tax. Stooks Smith provides two notes on what happened, following a result in which Thomas Rumbold received 87 votes and John Purling had 37 votes (a third candidate, William James, received 4 votes).

The Returning Officer on the ground that nearly all the 87 were bribed declared Mr. Purling elected, but Mr. Rumbold was seated on petition. On the 14th Feb. 1771, Mr. Roberts the Returning Officer was brought to the Bar of the House, and on his knees received a very severe reprimand from the Speaker for having taken upon himself to return Mr. Purling.

However, as a result of Mr. Robert's action there had been an investigation.

Parliamentary Elections, New Shoreham Act 1771
- Act of Parliament
- Parliament of Great Britain
- Long title: An Act to incapacitate John Burnett, Charles Hannington, Thomas Haselgrove, Ralph Moor, Thomas Parsons, Thomas Snook Junior, Thomas Hannington, John Hannington, John Robinson, William Cheeseman, George Browne, John Parsons, John Curl, Frederick Bean, William Bean, Samuel Tuppen, John Sawyers, Thomas Crowter, Thomas Pockney, Joseph Dedman, John Dean, John Whning, William Stevens. John Bawcomb, Robert Parker, John Hogsflesh, John Purse, John Dean, Thomas Jennings, John Snook Junior, Richard Tilstone, William Turner, Walter Sawyers, Charles Mitchell, John Jarmand, John Wood, Friend Baniel, William Gratwick, Nathaniel Hillman, Thomas Roberts, John Ashman, William Cooter, Thomas Frost, Michael Smith, Richard Carver, Michael Burrant, Emery Churcher, Walter Broad, Richard Stoneham, James Bennett, Clement Freeman, William Jupp, Thomas Crowter, John Barnard, James Mitchell, James Millar otherwise Miller, William Newnham, Jeffery Carver, Randall Button, James Carver, John Martin, John Dedman Senior, William Jennings, William Hards, Thomas Gear, William Rusbridge, Henry Robinson, and Henry Hannington, from voting at Elections of Members to serve in Parliament, and for the preventing Bribery and Corruption in the Election of Members to serve in Parliament, for the Borough of New Shoreham, in the County of Sussex.
- Citation: 11 Geo. 3. c. 55
- Territorial extent: Great Britain

Dates
- Royal assent: 8 May 1771
- Commencement: 13 November 1770 (Note: Start of session.)
- Repealed: 18 July 1872
Other legislation
| Amended by | Statute Law Revision Act 1861 |
| Repealed by | Ballot Act 1872 |

Status: Repealed

Text of statute as originally enacted

The evidence given by the Returning Officer, Mr. Hugh Roberts, before the Committee, was the means of bringing to light a most singular system of wholesale bribery, carried on by a body of Electors, who styled themselves, the "Christian Society", and who had for some time being in the habit of selling seats to the highest bidders. By 11th Geo. III. C. 55, (Note: Parliamentary Elections, New Shoreham Act 1771 (11 Geo. 3. c. 55)) the whole of the members, amounting to 81, were deprived of the right of again voting at any Parliamentary Election, and the old class of voters disfranchised, the right of election being extended to the 40s. freeholders of the Rape of Bramber.

The rapes were traditional subdivisions of Sussex. The six rapes each consisted of a strip of territory from the northern border of the county to its southern coast, so the area involved was considerably larger than that of the normal parliamentary borough.

As a result of the extension of the boundaries the constituency became more like a county one than a typical borough of the era.

When an electoral register was first compiled, before the 1832 election, the 1,925 electors included 701 freeholders and 189 scot and lot voters. The remaining electors would have qualified under the occupation franchise introduced for all boroughs by the Reform Act 1832, which also preserved the ancient right franchises of the existing electors. The twentieth century parliamentary historian Lewis Namier said that "New Shoreham was the first borough to be disenfranchised for corruption".

== Members of Parliament ==
=== 1295–1640 ===
| Parliament | First member | Second member |
|---|---|---|
| 1295 | Roger de Beauchamp | Thomas Pontoyse |
| 1298 | Godfrey atte Curt | Roger le Wake |
| 1300 | Roger de Beauchamp | Richard de Bokyngeham |
| 1303 | Henry de Burne | Roger de Beauchamp |
| 1304 | Richard Serle | Simon Iveny |
| 1307 | Richard Must | Richard Serle |
| 1309 | John Virley | John Frewyn |
| 1311 | John Virley | John Frewyn |
| 1313 | Henry de Bourne | William de Pevense |
| 1319 | John Loute | John Baudefait |
| 1325 | William Vyvyan | Thomas Moraunt |
| 1327 | Ralph Bovet | John le Blake |
| 1328 | Henry de Whitewei | John Swele |
| 1328 | Anselm atte Putte | John Swele |
| 1328 | Anselm atte Putte | John Swele |
| 1329 | Robert Apetot | Robert le Kenne |
| 1331 | John de Beauchamp | Anselm ante Putte |
| 1332 | Anselm atte Putte | Richard ?1VIoust |
| 1332 | Anselm atte Putte | John atto Grene |
| 1333 | Anselm atte Putte | David Fynian |
| 1334 | John Beauchamp | Germanus Hobelyt |
| 1335 | Robert le Puffare | John Beauchamp |
| 1336 | John de Beauchamp | John atte Crone |
| 1336 | Robert Puffer/Simon 1'houto | Thomas Fynian |
| 1337 | John Beauchamp | John Bernard |
| 1339 | Robert Puffaro | John Bernard |
| 1339 | Robert le Puffare | John Bernard |
| 1340 | John Beauchamp | Robert le Puffare |
| 1341 | John Beauchamp | Hugo de Coumbes |
| 1344 | John Beauchamp | Robert Puffero |
| 1346 | Robert Puffere | William L. . . |
| 1348 | John Beauchamp | Henry le Puffare |
| 1350 | John Bernard | Thomas Fynian |
| 1354 | Walter Woxebrugge | Thomas Finyan |
| 1355 | John Bernard | Walter Bailiff |
| 1357 | Walter Woxebrugg | Thomas Fynyan |
| 1357 | Thomas Bokyngham | William Snellyng |
| 1360 | John Bernard | Walter Bailiff |
| 1360 | John Bernard | Walter Woxebrugge |
| 1362 | Thomas Fynyan | Thomas Bokyngham |
| 1363 | John Bernard | William Snellyng |
| 1366 | Ralph Iver | William Snellyng |
| 1368 | John Bernard | John Barbour |
| 1369 | Richard Combo | John Barbour |
| 1371 | William Snellyng | |
| 1372 | William Snellyng | John Barbour |
| 1373 | William Taillour | Ralph Frore |
| 1376 | William Taillour | Ralph Frere |
| 1377 | Richard Bernard | John Barbour |
| 1378 | John Barbour | William Taillour |
| 1379 | John Barbour | Gregory Fromond |
| 1381 | Richard Bernard | Simon Benefeld |
| 1382 | William Shirford | Richard Bernard |
| 1382 | John Barbour | John Skully |
| 1382 | John Lynton | Simon Benefeld |
| 1383 | John Lynton | Simon Benefeld |
| 1384 | Simon Benefeld | John Lynton |
| 1384 | Simon Benefeld | Richard Bernard |
| 1385 | Robert Frye | John Lenton |
| 1386 | Richard Bernard | William Corveysor |
| 1388 (Feb) | Richard Bernard | Simon Benefeld |
| 1388 (Sep) | Richard Bernard | John Skully |
| 1390 (Jan) | Richard Bernard | Simon Benefeld |
| 1390 (Nov) | | |
| 1391 | Robert Frye | John Skully |
| 1393 | Richard Bernard | John Skully |
| 1394 | | |
| 1395 | Richard Bernard | Simon Benefeld |
| 1397 (Jan) | Robert Frye | Simon Benefeld |
| 1397 (Sep) | Gregory Fromond | William Hulle |
| 1399 | Robert Frye | John Soper |
| 1401 | | |
| 1402 | William Ede | Roger Farmcombe |
| 1404 (Jan) | | |
| 1404 (Oct) | | |
| 1406 | William Hokere | William Peck |
| 1407 | John atte Gate | John Skully |
| 1410 | | |
| 1411 | | |
| 1413 (Feb) | | |
| 1413 (May) | William Ede | John Draper |
| 1414 (Apr) | | |
| 1414 (Nov) | William Ede | Robert Benefeld |
| 1415 | | |
| 1416 (Mar) | William Askewith | John Draper |
| 1416 (Oct) | | |
| 1417 | Richard Dammer | Adam Feret |
| 1419 | | |
| 1420 | | |
| 1421 (May) | | |
| 1421 (Dec) | John Findon | Richard Roger |
| 1423 | Richard Dammer | William Langlegh |
| 1426 | Richard Roger | Adam Feret |
| 1427 | John Wrvthere | John Waleys |
| 1429 | William Snellyng | William Yongge |
| 1430 | Adam Feret | John Furly |
| 1432 | Richard Jay | Richard Dammer |
| 1433 | Thomas Hille | John Ham |
| 1435 | Richard Jay | John Furly |
| 1436 | Richard Jay | ?John Iiempe |
| 1441 | Richard Jay | Thomas Grevet |
| 1446 | John Veske | John Weston |
| 1448 | William Redston | John Beckwith |
| 1449 | William Bury | John Gloucestre |
| 1411 | Thomas Gvnnour | Edward Raffe |
| 1452 | Edward Raffe | William Say |
| 1459 | Hugo Till | Richard Awger |
| 1460 | Robert Spert | Nicholas Morley |
| 1467 | Richard Lewkenor | William Brandon |
| 1472 | Peter Veske | Richard Farnefold |
| 1477 | Peter Veske | John Cookson |
| 1482–1523 | No names known | |
| 1529 | John Covert | John Michell |
| 1536 | ? | |
| 1539 | ? | |
| 1542 | ? | |
| 1545 | John Gates | Henry Gates |
| 1547 | William Fitzwilliam | Anthony Bourchier, died and repl. by Jan 1552 by Sir Henry Hussey |
| 1553 (Mar) | John Fowler | Thomas Harvey |
| 1553 (Oct) | Thomas Roper | Thomas Elrington |
| 1554 (Apr) | Leonard West | William Mody |
| 1554 (Nov) | Simon Lowe alias Fyfield | William Mody |
| 1555 | Francis Shirley | Thomas Hogan |
| 1558 | Anthony Hussey | Richard Baker |
| 1558–9 | Richard Fulmerston | John Hussey |
| 1562–3 | Henry Knollys | Nicholas Mynn |
| 1571 | William Dix | John Bowles |
| 1572 | Edward Lewknor | Edward Fenner |
| 1584 | William Necton | Thomas Fenner |
| 1586 | William Necton | John Young |
| 1588 | William Necton | John Young |
| 1593 | William Necton | Herbert Morley |
| 1597 | William Necton | John Young |
| 1601 | John Morley | Robert Booth |
| 1604–1611 | Sir Bernard Whetstone | Sir Hugh Beeston |
| 1614 | Lord Howard of Effingham | Thomas Shelley |
| 1621 | Sir John Morley, died 1622 | Sir John Leedes |
| 1624 | Anthony Stapley | William Marlott |
| 1625 | Anthony Stapley | William Marlott |
| 1626 | John Alford | William Marlott |
| 1628 | Robert Morley | William Marlott |
| 1629–1640 | No Parliaments summoned | |

=== 1640–1885 ===
| Election | 1st member | 1st party | 2nd member | 2nd party |
|---|---|---|---|---|
| April 1640 | William Marlott | Parliamentarian | John Alford | Parliamentarian |
| November 1640 | William Marlott | Parliamentarian | John Alford | Parliamentarian |
| 1646 | Herbert Springet | | John Alford | Parliamentarian |
| December 1648 | Springet and Alford excluded in Pride's Purge – both seats vacant | | | |
| 1653 | New Shoreham was unrepresented in the Barebones Parliament and the First and Second Parliaments of the Protectorate | | | |
| January 1659 | John Whaley | | Edward Blaker | |
| May 1659 | Not represented in the restored Rump | | | |
| April 1660 | (Sir) Herbert Springet | | Edward Blaker | |
| 1662 | William Quatremaine | | Edward Blaker | |
| 1667 | John Fagg | | Edward Blaker | |
| 1673 | Henry Goring | | Edward Blaker | |
| 1678 | Henry Goring | | Sir Anthony Deane | |
| February 1679 | Robert Fagg | | John Cheale | |
| August 1679 | John Hales | | John Cheale | |
| 1681 | John Hales | | Robert Fagg | |
| 1685 | Sir Edward Hungerford | | Sir Richard Haddock | |
| 1689 | Sir Edward Hungerford | | John Monke | |
| 1690 | Sir Edward Hungerford | | John Perry | |
| 1695 | Henry Priestman | | John Perry | |
| 1698 | Charles Sergison | | John Perry | |
| 1701 | Charles Sergison | | Nathaniel Gould | |
| 1702 | John Perry | | Nathaniel Gould | |
| 1705 | John Wicker | | Nathaniel Gould | |
| May 1708 | Anthony Hammond | | Richard Lloyd | |
| December 1708 | Sir Gregory Page | | Richard Lloyd | |
| 1710 | Sir Gregory Page | | (Sir) Nathaniel Gould | |
| 1713 | Francis Chamberlayne | | (Sir) Nathaniel Gould | |
| 1715 | Sir Gregory Page | | (Sir) Nathaniel Gould | |
| 1720 | Francis Chamberlayne | | (Sir) Nathaniel Gould | |
| 1729 | Samuel Ongley | | John Gould | |
| 1734 | Thomas Frederick | | John Phillipson | |
| 1740 | John Frederick | | John Phillipson | |
| 1741 | Charles Frederick | | Thomas Brand | |
| 1747 | Charles Frederick | | Robert Bristow | |
| 1754 | Richard Stratton | | Robert Bristow | |
| 1758 | Sir William Williams | | Robert Bristow | |
| March 1761 | Sir William Williams | | The Viscount Midleton | |
| December 1761 | The Lord Pollington | | The Viscount Midleton | |
| 1765 | The Lord Pollington | | Vice-Admiral (Sir) Samuel Cornish | |
| 1768 | Peregrine Cust | | Vice-Admiral (Sir) Samuel Cornish | |
| November 1770 | Peregrine Cust | | John Purling | |
| December 1770 | Peregrine Cust | | Thomas Rumbold | |
| 1774 | Charles Goring | Whig | Sir John Shelley | Tory |
| 1780 | Sir Cecil Bisshopp | Tory | John Peachey | Tory |
| 1790 | Sir Harry Goring | Whig | John Clater Aldridge | Whig |
| 1795 | Sir Harry Goring | Whig | Hon. Charles Wyndham | Tory |
| 1796 | Sir Cecil Bisshopp | Tory | Hon. Charles Wyndham | Tory |
| 1802 | Sir Cecil Bisshopp | Tory | Timothy Shelley | Whig |
| 1806 | Sir Charles Burrell, Bt | Tory | Timothy Shelley | Whig |
| 1818 | Sir Charles Burrell, Bt | Tory | James Lloyd | Whig |
| 1826 | Sir Charles Burrell, Bt | Tory | Henry Howard | Whig |
| 1832 | Sir Charles Burrell, Bt | Tory | Harry Goring | Whig |
| 1834 | Sir Charles Burrell, Bt | Conservative | Harry Goring | Whig |
| 1841 | Sir Charles Burrell, Bt | Conservative | Charles Goring | Conservative |
| 1849 | Sir Charles Burrell, Bt | Conservative | Lord Alexander Gordon-Lennox | Conservative |
| 1859 | Sir Charles Burrell, Bt | Conservative | Rt Hon. Sir Stephen Cave | Conservative |
| 1862 | Sir Percy Burrell, Bt | Conservative | Rt Hon. Sir Stephen Cave | Conservative |
| 1876 | Sir Walter Burrell, Bt | Conservative | Rt Hon. Sir Stephen Cave | Conservative |
| 1880 | Sir Walter Burrell, Bt | Conservative | Robert Loder | Conservative |
| 1885 | Constituency abolished | | | |

== Election results ==
=== Elections in the 1830s ===
General election 1830: New Shoreham
| Party | Candidate | Votes | % |
|---|---|---|---|
| Tory | Charles Burrell | Unopposed | |
| Whig | Henry Howard | Unopposed | |
| Tory hold | | | |
| Whig hold | | | |

General election 1831: New Shoreham
| Party | Candidate | Votes | % |
|---|---|---|---|
| Tory | Charles Burrell | Unopposed | |
| Whig | Henry Howard | Unopposed | |
| Registered electors | | 1,600 | |
| Tory hold | | | |
| Whig hold | | | |

General election 1832: New Shoreham
| Party | Candidate | Votes | % |
|---|---|---|---|
| Tory | Charles Burrell | 785 | 39.9 |
| Whig | Harry Goring | 774 | 39.4 |
| Tory | George Frederick Jones | 406 | 20.7 |
| Turnout | | 1,154 | 59.9 |
| Registered electors | | 1,925 | |
| Majority | | 11 | 0.5 |
| Tory hold | | | |
| Majority | | 368 | 18.7 |
| Whig hold | | | |

General election 1835: New Shoreham
| Party | Candidate | Votes | % |
|---|---|---|---|
| Conservative | Charles Burrell | Unopposed | |
| Whig | Harry Goring | Unopposed | |
| Registered electors | | 1,910 | |
| Conservative hold | | | |
| Whig hold | | | |

General election 1837: New Shoreham
| Party | Candidate | Votes | % |
|---|---|---|---|
| Whig | Harry Goring | 850 | 37.9 |
| Conservative | Charles Burrell | 773 | 34.5 |
| Whig | David Salomons | 619 | 27.6 |
| Turnout | | 1,322 | 68.1 |
| Registered electors | | 1,940 | |
| Majority | | 77 | 3.4 |
| Whig hold | | | |
| Majority | | 154 | 6.9 |
| Conservative hold | | | |

=== Elections in the 1840s ===
General election 1841: New Shoreham
| Party | Candidate | Votes | % | ±% |
|---|---|---|---|---|
| Conservative | Charles Burrell | 959 | 38.5 | +21.3 |
| Conservative | Charles Goring | 856 | 34.4 | +17.2 |
| Whig | Edward Fitzalan-Howard | 673 | 27.0 | −38.5 |
| Majority | | 183 | 7.4 | +0.5 |
| Turnout | | 1,581 (est) | 82.4 (est) | c. +14.3 |
| Registered electors | | 1,918 | | |
| Conservative hold | | Swing | +20.3 | |
| Conservative gain from Whig | | Swing | +18.2 | |

General election 1847: New Shoreham
| Party | Candidate | Votes | % | ±% |
|---|---|---|---|---|
| Conservative | Charles Burrell | Unopposed | | |
| Conservative | Charles Goring | Unopposed | | |
| Registered electors | | 1,864 | | |
| Conservative hold | | | | |
| Conservative hold | | | | |

Goring's death caused a by-election.

By-election, 28 December 1849: New Shoreham
| Party | Candidate | Votes | % | ±% |
|---|---|---|---|---|
| Conservative | Lord Alexander Gordon-Lennox | Unopposed | | |
| Conservative hold | | | | |

=== Elections in the 1850s ===
General election 1852: New Shoreham
| Party | Candidate | Votes | % | ±% |
|---|---|---|---|---|
| Conservative | Charles Burrell | Unopposed | | |
| Conservative | Lord Alexander Gordon-Lennox | Unopposed | | |
| Registered electors | | 1,865 | | |
| Conservative hold | | | | |
| Conservative hold | | | | |

General election 1857: New Shoreham
| Party | Candidate | Votes | % | ±% |
|---|---|---|---|---|
| Conservative | Charles Burrell | 991 | 43.4 | N/A |
| Conservative | Lord Alexander Gordon-Lennox | 806 | 35.3 | N/A |
| Independent Liberal | Henry Williams Pemberton | 487 | 21.3 | New |
| Majority | | 319 | 14.0 | N/A |
| Turnout | | 1,386 (est) | 77.0 (est) | N/A |
| Registered electors | | 1,800 | | |
| Conservative hold | | Swing | N/A | |
| Conservative hold | | Swing | N/A | |

General election 1859: New Shoreham
| Party | Candidate | Votes | % | ±% |
|---|---|---|---|---|
| Conservative | Charles Burrell | Unopposed | | |
| Conservative | Stephen Cave | Unopposed | | |
| Registered electors | | 1,843 | | |
| Conservative hold | | | | |
| Conservative hold | | | | |

=== Elections in the 1860s ===
Burrell's death caused a by-election.

By-election, 5 February 1862: New Shoreham
| Party | Candidate | Votes | % | ±% |
|---|---|---|---|---|
| Conservative | Percy Burrell | Unopposed | | |
| Conservative hold | | | | |

General election 1865: New Shoreham
| Party | Candidate | Votes | % | ±% |
|---|---|---|---|---|
| Conservative | Stephen Cave | 972 | 39.6 | N/A |
| Conservative | Percy Burrell | 891 | 36.3 | N/A |
| Liberal | James Hannen | 592 | 24.1 | New |
| Majority | | 299 | 12.2 | N/A |
| Turnout | | 1,524 (est) | 77.0 (est) | N/A |
| Registered electors | | 1,978 | | |
| Conservative hold | | Swing | N/A | |
| Conservative hold | | Swing | N/A | |

Cave was appointed Vice-President of the Board of Trade, requiring a by-election.

By-election, 14 July 1866: New Shoreham
| Party | Candidate | Votes | % | ±% |
|---|---|---|---|---|
| Conservative | Stephen Cave | Unopposed | | |
| Conservative hold | | | | |

General election 1868: New Shoreham
| Party | Candidate | Votes | % | ±% |
|---|---|---|---|---|
| Conservative | Percy Burrell | Unopposed | | |
| Conservative | Stephen Cave | Unopposed | | |
| Registered electors | | 4,774 | | |
| Conservative hold | | | | |
| Conservative hold | | | | |

=== Elections in the 1870s ===
General election 1874: New Shoreham
| Party | Candidate | Votes | % | ±% |
|---|---|---|---|---|
| Conservative | Percy Burrell | 2,527 | 43.3 | N/A |
| Conservative | Stephen Cave | 2,414 | 41.4 | N/A |
| Liberal | William Lyon | 896 | 15.4 | New |
| Majority | | 1,518 | 26.0 | N/A |
| Turnout | | 3,367 (est) | 67.4 (est) | N/A |
| Registered electors | | 4,998 | | |
| Conservative hold | | Swing | N/A | |
| Conservative hold | | Swing | N/A | |

Cave was appointed Judge Advocate General of the Armed Forces and Paymaster General, requiring a by-election.

By-election, 13 Mar 1874: New Shoreham
| Party | Candidate | Votes | % | ±% |
|---|---|---|---|---|
| Conservative | Stephen Cave | Unopposed | | |
| Conservative hold | | | | |

Burrell's death caused a by-election.

By-election, 5 Aug 1876: New Shoreham
| Party | Candidate | Votes | % | ±% |
|---|---|---|---|---|
| Conservative | Walter Burrell | 2,152 | 60.7 | −24.0 |
| Liberal | William Egerton Hubbard | 1,394 | 39.3 | +23.9 |
| Majority | | 758 | 21.4 | −4.6 |
| Turnout | | 3,546 | 69.1 | +1.7 |
| Registered electors | | 5,129 | | |
| Conservative hold | | Swing | −24.0 | |

=== Elections in the 1880s ===
General election 1880: New Shoreham
| Party | Candidate | Votes | % | ±% |
|---|---|---|---|---|
| Conservative | Walter Burrell | 2,445 | 37.6 | −5.7 |
| Conservative | Robert Loder | 2,195 | 33.8 | −7.6 |
| Liberal | William Egerton Hubbard | 2,059 | 31.7 | +16.3 |
| Majority | | 136 | 2.1 | −23.9 |
| Turnout | | 4,379 (est) | 79.9 (est) | +12.5 |
| Registered electors | | 5,480 | | |
| Conservative hold | | Swing | −6.9 | |
| Conservative hold | | Swing | −7.9 | |

== See also ==
- Unreformed House of Commons

== Sources ==
- Victoria History of the County of Sussex – south part of the Rape of Bramber
- Boundaries of Parliamentary Constituencies 1885–1972, compiled and edited by F. W. S. Craig (Parliamentary Reference Publications 1972)
- British Parliamentary Election Results 1832–1885, compiled and edited by F.W.S. Craig (The Macmillan Press 1977)
- The Parliaments of England by Henry Stooks Smith (1st edition published in three volumes 1844–50), second edition edited (in one volume) by F.W.S. Craig (Political Reference Publications 1973) out of copyright
- Who's Who of British Members of Parliament: Volume I 1832–1885, edited by M. Stenton (The Harvester Press 1976)
- D. Brunton & D. H. Pennington, Members of the Long Parliament (London: George Allen & Unwin, 1954)
- Cobbett's Parliamentary history of England, from the Norman Conquest in 1066 to the year 1803 (London: Thomas Hansard, 1808)
- Maija Jansson (ed.) Proceedings in Parliament, 1614 (House of Commons) (Philadelphia: American Philosophical Society, 1988)
- J E Neale, The Elizabethan House of Commons (London: Jonathan Cape, 1949)
- Leigh Rayment's Historical List of MPs – Constituencies beginning with "N" (part 2)
