= Emmanuel Chamond =

English politician (c.1553–1611)

Emmanuel Chamond (c. 1553 – 1611), of the Middle Temple and St. Giles, Cripplegate, London, was an English politician.

He was a Member (MP) of the Parliament of England for Camelford in 1584, for Bodmin in 1586–7 and 1588–9 and for Newport, Cornwall in 1593.
