= Goring baronets =

Title in the Baronetage of England

Arms of Goring of Burton and of Goring of Highden, both in Sussex: Argent, a chevron between three annulets gules

There have been two baronetcies created for persons with the surname Goring, both in the Baronetage of England. The second creation came into the family through a special remainder in the patent creating the baronetcy. Only the latter creation is extant as of 2008.

The Goring Baronetcy, of Burton in the County of (West) Sussex, was created in the Baronetage of England on 14 May 1622 for William Goring, subsequently Member of Parliament for Sussex. The title became extinct on the death of the third Baronet in 1724.

The Bowyer, later Goring Baronetcy, of Highden in the County of Sussex, was created in the Baronetage of England on 18 May 1678 for Sir James Bowyer, 3rd Baronet, of Leighthorne (see Bowyer baronets), with remainder to Henry Goring and with the precedence of 23 July 1627, the date when the Bowyer Baronetcy of Leighthorne was created. Bowyer had prior to the second creation surrendered the original patent. On Bowyer's death in 1680 the Bowyer Baronetcy became extinct while he was succeeded in the 1678 creation according to the special remainder by Henry Goring, the second Baronet. He sat as Member of Parliament for Sussex and Steyning. The fourth Baronet represented Horsham and Steyning in the House of Commons and was created Viscount Goring and Baron Bullinghel in the Jacobite Peerage in 1722. The sixth and eighth Baronets both sat as Members of Parliament for New Shoreham. The seventh Baronet was High Sheriff of Sussex in 1827. Charles Goring, second son of the fifth Baronet, was member of Parliament for New Shoreham.

The Goring family is of great antiquity in Sussex. A John Goring represented Sussex in Parliament in 1467 while George Goring, 1st Earl of Norwich, was a member of another branch of the family (see Earl of Norwich).

== Goring baronets, of Burton (1622) ==
- Sir William Goring, 1st Baronet (died 1658)
- Sir Henry Goring, 2nd Baronet (c. 1618–1671)
- Sir William Goring, 3rd Baronet (c. 1659 – 29 February 1724)

== Goring baronets, of Highden (1627/1678) ==
- Sir James Bowyer, 3rd and 1st Baronet (died 1680)
- Sir Henry Goring, 2nd Baronet (1622–1702)
  - Henry Goring (1647–1687), only son of Sir Henry Goring, 2nd Baronet.
- Sir Charles Goring, 3rd Baronet (c. 1668–1714)
- Sir Henry Goring, 4th Baronet (1679–1731)
- Sir Charles Mathew Goring, 5th Baronet (1706–1769)
- Sir Harry Goring, 6th Baronet (1739–1824)
- Sir Charles Foster Goring, 7th Baronet (1768–1844)
- Sir Harry Dent Goring, 8th Baronet (1801–1859)
- Sir Charles Goring, 9th Baronet (1828–1884)
- Sir Craven Charles Goring, 10th Baronet (1841–1897)
- Sir Harry Yelverton Goring, 11th Baronet (1840–1911)
- Sir Forster Gurney Goring, 12th Baronet (1876–1956)
- Sir William Burton Nigel Goring, 13th Baronet (1933–2024)
- Sir Richard Harry Goring, 14th Baronet (born 1949)

The heir apparent is the present baronet's son Richard John Goring (born 1978). He has a son, Finlay Dominic (born 2008).
