= Leonard West (politician) =

16th-century English politician

Leonard West (by 1518 – 1578) was an English politician.

He was a member (MP) of the parliament of England for New Shoreham in April 1554.
