= John Harley Weston =

Background information
- Born: John Higgins; 24 April 1967 (age 58)
- Origin: Glasgow, Scotland
- Genres: Rock/Folk music/Blues/Alt Country
- Occupations: Singer-songwriter and musician
- Years active: 20
- Labels: Independent (Polydor, Festival)
- Formerly of: Frontier
- Website: http://www.johnharleyweston.com

John Harley Weston (born 24 April 1967) is a Scottish-born Australian based singer-songwriter, who also plays a variety of instruments including guitar, keyboards and piano accordion and, in 2005, won the Australian National Songwriting Contest (rock category) with the song "Last Days of Summer" from his 2004 album, Hope Harbour.

== Career ==
Born in Glasgow, John Higgins grew up in the East Ayrshire town of Stewarton and subsequently immigrated to the Tamborine Mountain region in the southeastern part of Australian state of Queensland. Using the performing name John Harley Weston, he has been a professional musician since 1990. He won the 2005 Australian National Songwriting Contest rock category with "Last Days of Summer", co-written with drummer/guitarist Tony Beard (who has worked with Crosby, Stills & Nash, Jeff Beck, Hall & Oates and Johnny Winter), extending to its placement with a top 20 place at the Unisong International Songwriting Contest 2005–2006 and receiving an Honourable Mention from the 13th annual Billboard World Songwriting Contest. In the same year, at singeruniverse.com, Weston was voted one of the top 5 best vocalists in the Independent Music World by music publisher Dale Kawashima, former executive at Sony/ATV Music Publishing, Irving Azoff's Giant Records and Mercury Records.

Another song (on the same album), "Brothers and Sisters", produced by Sandy Jones at Foundry Music Lab in Motherwell, Scotland, and Graeme Duffin (Wet Wet Wet guitarist). about the conflict between Israel and Palestine held the number one spot on Ison Live Radio (ILR Australian Indie Radio Charts) for an entire six months in 2007.

In 2008, Weston released the album Welcome Back to Reality. Two songs were chosen by Channel 7 Television Australia for their 2008 Beijing Olympic Games playlist and featured on Channel 9 Television's 'The Voice'.

Readers of the Gold Coast Bulletin (a newspaper servicing Gold Coast, Queensland) nominated John Harley Weston for a Gold Coast Honours Award in Entertainment (2008) for his services to music and support of charities such as Cancer Council Queensland.

In 2016 Weston released another album Music Man, produced again by Sandy Jones of Foundry Music Lab, Motherwell.

In 2022 Weston released the single, Voices, which includes references to Glasgow's George Square statues of Scottish poet Robert Burns, Scottish novelist, poet and playwright Sir Walter Scott and the 18th century and early 19th century movement known as Scottish Enlightenment.

In 1999, Weston wrote the song "Road To Victory" for the Brisbane Lions Aussie Rules football team (released via Festival Records Fido label now Mushroom Records).

Weston's music has been added to the National Library of Australia and the National Film and Sound Archive a joint venture by Music Australia to create a database of all written and musical works released in Australia.

== Solo career ==
As a solo artist, John Harley Weston has supported Indigo Girls at King Tut's Wah Wah Hut in Glasgow, Duran Duran at Glasgow Barrowlands, John Swan (Swanee) at St Bernards Hotel on Tamborine Mountain and Lighthouse Family also at King Tut's. John has also performed at the Queensland Premier's Australia Day Celebrations at The Piazza, South Bank Parklands, Brisbane as well as shows for Gold Coast City Council and the Gold Coast mayor Ron Clarke MBE, the Beaudesert Shire Mayor, Palazzo Versace's flagship hotel, Gold Coast Arts Centre (Unplugged in the Basement), Brisbane's Acoustic in the Park Festival, Ric's Bar, Brisbane, The centre, Beaudesert and other local venues in South East Queensland.

In the early 1990s, Weston was signed (under his birth name John Higgins) to Polygram Records Vertigo label (now Mercury Records) as lead singer and co-songwriter with Scottish band Frontier Frontier released two singles in 1992, original song "Lonely Heart" (produced by Steely Dan producer Gary Katz) and a cover of the Graham Parker song "The Sun is Gonna Shine Again" (produced by Kenny McDonald). Frontier supported Wet Wet Wet during 1992 UK stadium tour which included gigs at Wembley arena. They also supported the band Gun in the same year on their UK university tour, including venues such as London Astoria.

During his solo career, and as lead singer with Scottish band Frontier, John Harley Weston has worked with producers, engineers and session players such as Gary Katz (Steely Dan), Sandy Jones (see link 8) and Graeme Duffin (Wet Wet Wet), Ian Kewley (Paul Young), Dave Bascombe (Peter Gabriel, Tears for Fears), Kenny McDonald (Texas), Steve Jackson (Bryan Adams), Adam Mosely (Rush), Tony Philips (Seal) and session players Paul "Wix" Wickens (keyboard player for Paul McCartney, Bon Jovi, Bob Dylan), Tony Beard (drummer for Crosby, Stills & Nash, Jeff Beck, Hall & Oates and Johnny Winter, (see link 4)) Graham Broad (drummer for Van Morisson, George Michael, Go West) and Donny Little (guitarist for Paulo Nutini).

Weston has recorded at Rockfield Studios in Monmouth, Wales, Peter Gabriel's Real World Studios in Box, Wiltshire, England, George Martin's Air Studios in London, Jacobs Studio in Surrey, England, Jimmy Page's Old Mill Studio, Parklane Studios in Glasgow, Pete Townshend's Eel Pie Studios on the River Thames in London, Rooster 2 in London, Swanyard Studio, London, Red Zeds in Brisbane (Australia).

John Harley Weston is endorsed by Takamine Guitars, D'Addario Guitar Strings and Neumann Microphones.
