= John atte Gate =

English politician

John atte Gate (fl. 1402–1407) was an English politician and cloth merchant. He sat as MP for New Shoreham in 1407.
