= Robert Frye (MP for New Shoreham) =

English politician

Robert Frye (fl. 1385–1399) of Shoreham, Sussex, served as an English politician.

He was a member (MP) of the parliament of England for New Shoreham in 1385, 1391, January 1397, and 1399.
