= John Weston (MP for New Shoreham) =

15th-century English politician

John Weston (fl. 1446–1447) was an English politician.

He was a member (MP) of the parliament of England for New Shoreham in 1447.

Parliament of England
Preceded by Richard Jay; Thomas Grevet	Member of Parliament for New Shoreham; 1447; With: John Veske	Succeeded by William Redston; John Beckwith
