= Nicholas Mynn =

16th-century English politician

- Occupation: Politician
- Years active: 1558–1572

Nicholas Mynn (fl. 1558–1572), of Little Walsingham, Norfolk, was an English politician.

== Life ==
Mynn was the second son of John Mynn. He married Elizabeth Drury, who was the daughter of Robert Drury.

Mynn was a servant of Thomas Howard, the Duke of Norfolk.

Mynn was a Member (MP) of the Parliament of England for Bramber in 1558, Horsham in 1559, New Shoreham in 1563, Morpeth in 1571 and Castle Rising in 1572.

In 1558, the Duke of Norfolk sent him to Rome to secure a dispensation for Norfolk's second marriage. By 1560, he had moved to Little Walsingham. Nothing further is known about him after 1572.
