= John Beauchamp (MP for New Shoreham) =

14th-century English politician

John Beauchamp (fl. 1334–1348) was an English politician.

John Beauchamp may well be the same person as the New Shoreham MP, John de Beauchamp who served around the same time (1331–32 and 1336).

He was a member (MP) of the parliament of England for New Shoreham in 1334, 1335–36, 1337–38, 1340, 1341, 1344 and 1348.
