= Henry Knollys (politician, died 1583) =

16th-century English politician and diplomat

Henry Knollys (died 1583) was an English politician and diplomat.

He was a member (MP) of the parliament of England for Grampound in 1547, New Shoreham in 1563, Guildford in 1571 and Christchurch in 1572.
