= William Goring (cricketer) =

English cricketer

William Goring (5 December 1811 – 9 May 1849) was an English first-class cricketer who played for Sussex between 1833 and 1835.

Goring was born at Highden, Shoreham-by-Sea, Sussex, the son of Sir Charles Forster Goring, 7th Baronet and his wife Bridget Dent. He played his debut first-class match at Lords in June 1833 for a team A-K against a team L-Z, when he was not out as last man in during the first innings, and was bowled for his top score of 10 in the second innings by Fuller Pilch. He made his debut for Sussex in July against an England team. He played two more matches for Sussex against England in the 1833 season, and two matches in the 1834 season. He also played for St John's Wood against Marylebone Cricket Club (MCC) in 1834. His last first-class match for Sussex was against MCC in 1835. He also played against MCC for the Household Brigade in 1835, and played for Gentlemen of Sussex in 1836.

Goring played 14 innings in 7 first-class matches with an average of 3.81 and a top score of 10.

Goring died at Carshalton, Surrey at the age of 37.

Goring married, firstly, Louisa Smith in 1837 and secondly Catherine Barwell Skryme, daughter of Thomas Skryme, on 6 April 1848.
