= Lord Alexander Gordon-Lennox =

British politician (1825–1892)

Member of Parliament for New Shoreham
- In office 1849–1859 Serving with Sir Charles Burrell, 3rd Baronet
- Preceded by: Charles Goring
- Succeeded by: Stephen Cave

Personal details
- Born: Lord Alexander Francis Charles Lennox; 14 June 1825 Mayfair, London, England
- Died: 22 January 1892 (aged 66) Chelsea, London
- Party: Conservative
- Spouse: Emily Towneley (m. 1863)
- Children: Cosmo Gordon-Lennox
- Parent: Charles, 5th Duke of Richmond (father)
- Relatives: Charles, 6th Duke of Richmond (brother); Lord Henry Lennox (brother); Lord George Gordon-Lennox (brother)
- Military career
- Rank: Captain
- Unit: Royal Horse Guards

Lord Alexander Francis Charles Gordon-Lennox (né Lennox; 14 June 1825 – 22 January 1892) was a British Conservative politician and aristocrat.

== Background ==
Gordon-Lennox was born at Grosvenor Square, Mayfair, the fourth son of Charles Gordon-Lennox, 5th Duke of Richmond, and Lady Caroline, daughter of Field Marshal Henry Paget, 1st Marquess of Anglesey. Charles Gordon-Lennox, 6th Duke of Richmond and Lord Henry Lennox were his elder brothers and Lord George Gordon-Lennox his younger brother. Alexander was born with the surname Lennox; when his father inherited the Gordon estates from his uncle, the father took the surname Gordon-Lennox for himself and his issue, by royal licence dated 9 August 1836.

== Political career ==
Gordon-Lennox was elected Member of Parliament for New Shoreham in 1849, a seat he held until 1859. He was also a Captain in the Royal Horse Guards.

== Family ==
Gordon-Lennox married Emily Frances Towneley, daughter of Colonel Charles Towneley and Lady Caroline Molyneux of Towneley Hall, Burnley, in 1863. They had two children, one surviving:

- Cosmo Charles Gordon-Lennox (1868–1921), actor who married Marie Tempest, and died childless
- Daughter (born and died 28 June 1869)

After a long illness, Lord Alexander died in 1892 at his house at 21 Pont Street, Chelsea, aged 66. His wife died of typhoid fever on New Year's Eve of the same year.

Parliament of the United Kingdom
Preceded by Sir Charles Burrell, Bt; Charles Goring	Member of Parliament for New Shoreham; 1849–1859; With: Sir Charles Burrell, Bt	Succeeded by Sir Charles Burrell, Bt; Stephen Cave
