= John Beauchamp (cricketer) =

English cricketer

John Beauchamp (20 October 1825 – 30 May 1911) was an English first-class cricketer active 1854–62 who played for Surrey. He was born in Chertsey and died in Greenham, Berkshire where he lived. He played in six first-class matches.
