= Sir William Goring, 1st Baronet =

English politician

Arms of Goring of Burton in Sussex (Goring baronets): Argent, a chevron between three annulets gules

Sir William Goring, 1st Baronet (died 1658) was an English politician who sat in the House of Commons from 1628 to 1629.

Goring was the son of Sir Henry Goring (also written as Henrie Goringe) of Burton, West Sussex, and his wife Eleanor Kingsmill, daughter of Sir William Kingsmill, of Sydmonton, Hampshire. He was baptised 28 April 1595. He was created a baronet on 14 May 1622. He succeeded his father on 16 July 1626. In 1628, he was elected Member of Parliament for Sussex and sat until 1629 when King Charles decided to rule without parliament for eleven years.

Goring died in 1658 and was buried at Burton on 25 February 1658.

Goring married Bridget Fraunceys, daughter of Sir Edward Fraunceys and Elizabeth Astlowe, and had nine children, including Sir Henry Goring, 2nd Baronet, Percy (who also became an MP), and Bridget, who married Sir Thomas Hatton, 2nd Baronet.

Parliament of England
Preceded by Sir Walter Covert; Sir Alexander Temple	Member of Parliament for Sussex; 1628–1629; With: Richard Lewknor	Parliament suspended until 1640
Baronetage of England
New creation	Baronet (of Burton); 1622–1658	Succeeded by Henry Goring
