= Stephen Cave =

British lawyer, writer and Conservative politician

The Right Honourable Sir Stephen Cave GCB JP DL FSA
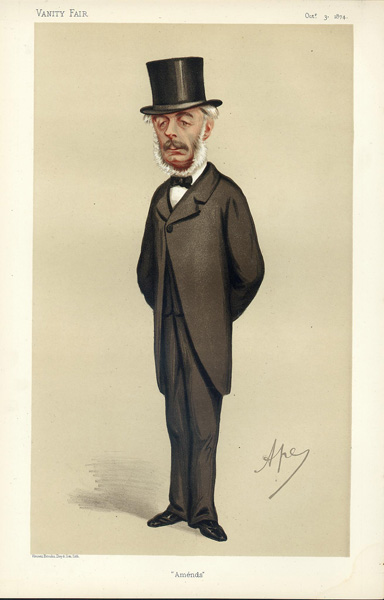
- "Amends"; The Rt Hon Stephen Cave MP as caricatured by Ape (Carlo Pellegrini) in Vanity Fair, October 1874

Paymaster General
- In office 10 July 1866 – 1 December 1868
- Monarch: Queen Victoria
- Prime Minister: The Earl of Derby; Benjamin Disraeli
- Preceded by: William Monsell
- Succeeded by: The Earl of Dufferin
- In office 20 April 1874 – 21 April 1880
- Monarch: Queen Victoria
- Prime Minister: Benjamin Disraeli
- Preceded by: William Patrick Adam
- Succeeded by: Hon. David Plunket

Vice-President of the Board of Trade
- In office 10 July 1866 – 12 August 1867
- Monarch: Queen Victoria
- Prime Minister: The Earl of Derby
- Preceded by: William Monsell
- Succeeded by: Marcus Fysh (2020)

Judge Advocate General
- In office 7 March 1874 – 24 November 1875
- Monarch: Queen Victoria
- Prime Minister: Benjamin Disraeli
- Preceded by: Acton Smee Ayrton
- Succeeded by: George Cavendish-Bentinck

Personal details
- Born: 28 December 1820 Clifton, near Bristol, England
- Died: 6 June 1880 (aged 59) Chambéry, Savoy (now France)
- Party: Conservative
- Spouse: Emma Smyth (d. 1905)
- Education: Balliol College, Oxford

Sir Stephen Cave GCB PC JP DL FSA (28 December 1820 – 6 June 1880) was a British lawyer, writer and Conservative politician. He served as Paymaster General between 1866 and 1868 and again between 1874 and 1880 and as Judge Advocate General between 1874 and 1875.

== Background and education ==
Born at Clifton, Cave was the eldest son of Daniel Cave, of Cleve Hill, near Bristol (d. 9 March 1872), by his marriage on 15 April 1820 to Frances, only daughter of Henry Locock, MD, of London. He was the grandson of Stephen Cave, the enslaver. Cave's younger brother was the banker Sir Charles Cave, 1st Baronet. He was educated at Harrow and Balliol College, Oxford

At Oxford, Cave was involved in a fatal accident in February 1840 at Sandford Lock on the River Thames, a notoriously dangerous part of the river where many have drowned in boating and swimming accidents. He and another Balliol College student, John Richardson Currer (the brother of Charles Savile Roundell), were boating upstream of the lock when their boat was swept onto the weir and swamped. Cave got to safety while Currier was pulled into the turbulent weir-pool known as Sandford Lasher and drowned,

Cave graduated BA in 1843 and MA in 1846.

== Legal and political career ==
Being called to the bar at the Inner Temple on 20 November 1846, Cave started his career by going to the western circuit. On 29 April 1859, he entered parliament as Conservative Member of Parliament for New Shoreham, and retained this seat until 24 March 1880. He was sworn of the Privy Council on 10 July 1866, and served as Vice-President of the Board of Trade under the Earl of Derby between 1866 and 1867, when the office was abolished, and as Paymaster General under Derby and then Benjamin Disraeli from 1866 until the fall of the Conservative government in December 1868. In 1866, he was appointed chief commissioner for negotiating a fishery convention in Paris.

When the Conservatives returned to power under Disraeli in February 1874, Cave was appointed Judge Advocate General and Paymaster-General. He relinquished the former office in November 1875 but continued as Paymaster-General until 1880. In December 1875 he was sent on a special mission to Egypt by Benjamin Disraeli to report on the financial condition of that country together with John Stokes. He returned in March 1876. On 20 March 1880 he was appointed a Knight Grand Cross of the Order of the Bath (GCB).

Cave was also a Fellow of the Society of Antiquaries, of the Zoological Society, and of other learned societies, chairman of the West India Committee, a director of the Bank of England and of the London Dock Company and a deputy lieutenant and justice of the peace for Gloucestershire.

== Family ==
Cave married Emma Jane, eldest daughter of the Reverend William Smyth of Elkington Hall, Lincolnshire, on 7 September 1852. They had no children. He died at Chambéry, Savoy, on 6 June 1880, aged 60. Lady Cave died in November 1905.

== Publications ==
- A Few Words on the Encouragement given to Slavery and the Slave Trade by recent Measures, and chiefly by the Sugar Bill of 1846 (1849).
- Prevention and Reformation the Duty of the State or of Individuals? With some account of a Reformatory Institution (1856).
- On the distinctive Principles of Punishment and Reformation (1857).
- Papers relating to Free Labour and the Slave Trade (1861).

Parliament of the United Kingdom
Preceded by Sir Charles Burrell, Bt; Lord Alexander Gordon-Lennox	Member of Parliament for New Shoreham; 1859–1880; With: Sir Charles Burrell, Bt 1859–1862; Sir Percy Burrell, Bt 1862–1876; Sir Walter Burrell, Bt 1876–1880	Succeeded by Sir Walter Burrell, Bt; Robert Loder
Political offices
Preceded by William Monsell	Paymaster General; 1866–1868	Succeeded by The Earl of Dufferin
Preceded by William Monsell	Vice-President of the Board of Trade; 1866–1867	Office abolished
Preceded by William Patrick Adam	Paymaster General; 1874–1880	Succeeded by Hon. David Plunket
Legal offices
Preceded by Acton Smee Ayrton	Judge Advocate General; 1874–1875	Succeeded by George Cavendish-Bentinck
