= Molyneux baronets of Teversall (1611) =

Escutcheon of the Molyneux baronets of Teversall

The Molyneux baronetcy, of Tevershalt in Nottinghamshire, was created in the Baronetage of England on 29 June 1611 for John Molyneux, High Sheriff of Nottinghamshire in 1609 and 1611. The Molyneux seat at Teversal Manor, near Mansfield, came into the family by the 16th-century marriage of Francis Molyneux to the Teversall heiress, Elizabeth Greenhalgh.

Later the Wellow estate, also in Nottinghamshire, devolved on the 6th Baronet, through his marriage to Anne Challand. The baronetcy became extinct in 1812, on the death of the unmarried 7th Baronet.

== Molyneux of Teversall, Nottinghamshire (1611) ==
- Sir John Molyneux, 1st Baronet (died before 1618)
- Sir Francis Molyneux, 2nd Baronet (1602–1674)
- Sir John Molyneux, 3rd Baronet (1625–1674)
- Sir Francis Molyneux, 4th Baronet (1656–1742) Member of Parliament for Newark 1693–1700 and for Nottinghamshire 1701–05.
- Sir Charles Molyneux, 5th Baronet (died 1764), High Sheriff of Nottinghamshire 1746; succeeded by his brother.
- Sir William Molyneux, 6th Baronet (died 1781), High Sheriff of Nottinghamshire 1737
- Sir Francis Molyneux, 7th Baronet (died 1812), Gentleman Usher of the Black Rod 1765

The title was extinct on the 7th Baronet's death.

== Extended family ==
The Molyneux estates passed to Juliana Molyneux (1749–1808), sister of the 7th Baronet. She married Henry Howard, of Glossop (1713–1787), a descendant of the 22nd Earl of Arundel: their eldest son succeeded as 12th Duke of Norfolk and their second son, Lord Henry Thomas Howard-Molyneux-Howard (1766–1824), had a daughter, Henrietta Anna, who married Henry John George Herbert, 3rd Earl of Carnarvon, whose eldest son, the 4th Earl, was Henry Howard Molyneux Herbert.

== Notes ==
Baronetage of England
Preceded by Cholmondeley baronets	Molyneux baronets of Teversall; 29 June 1611	Succeeded by Wortley baronets
