= Richard Bernard (MP for New Shoreham) =

14th-century English politician

Richard Bernard (fl. 1377–1395) was an English politician.

He was a member (MP) of the parliament of England for New Shoreham from 1377 to 1395.
