= William Necton =

16th-century English politician

William Necton (fl. 1584–1597), of London, was an English politician.

He was a member (MP) of the parliament of England for New Shoreham in 1584, 1586, 1589, 1593 and 1597.
