= John Young (MP for New Shoreham) =

English politician (fl. 1586–1597)

John Young (fl. 1586–1597) was an English politician.

He was a Member of Parliament (MP) for New Shoreham in 1586, 1589 and 1597. He was MP for Rye in 1604.
