= Simon Benefeld =

14th-century English politician

Simon Benefeld (fl. 1381–1397) of Shoreham-by-Sea, Sussex, was an English politician.

== Career ==
He was a member (MP) of the parliament of England for New Shoreham in 1381, February 1383, October 1383, April 1384, November 1384, February 1388, January 1390, 1395 and January 1397.
