= Sir Harry Goring, 8th Baronet =

English politician

Sir Harry Dent Goring, 8th Baronet (30 December 1801 – 19 April 1859), was an English politician.

He was a Member (MP) for New Shoreham in 1832.

Baronetage of England
Preceded by Charles Foster Goring	Baronet (of Highden); 1844–1859	Succeeded by Charles Goring
