= Burrell baronets =

Set index for Burrell baronets

There has been one baronetcy created for a person with the surname Burrell. Another baronetcy passed by special remainder to the Burrell family. The latter is extant.

- Burrell baronets of West Grinstead Park (1766): see Baron Gwydyr
- Raymond, later Burrell baronets, of Valentine House (1774): see Raymond baronets
