= Roger de Beauchamp =

13th-century English politician

Roger de Beauchamp was an English Member of Parliament (MP).

He was a Member of the Parliament of England for New Shoreham in 1295, 1300 and 1303.

Parliament of England
Preceded by ? ?	Member of Parliament for New Shoreham; 1295; With: Thomas Pontoyse	Succeeded by Godfrey atte Curt; Roger le Wake
