= John Virley =

English politician

John Virley (fl. 1309–1311) was an English politician.

He was a member (MP) of the parliament of England for New Shoreham in 1309 and 1311.
