= Siege of Worcester =

Part of the First English Civil War in 1646

- Part of the First English Civil War
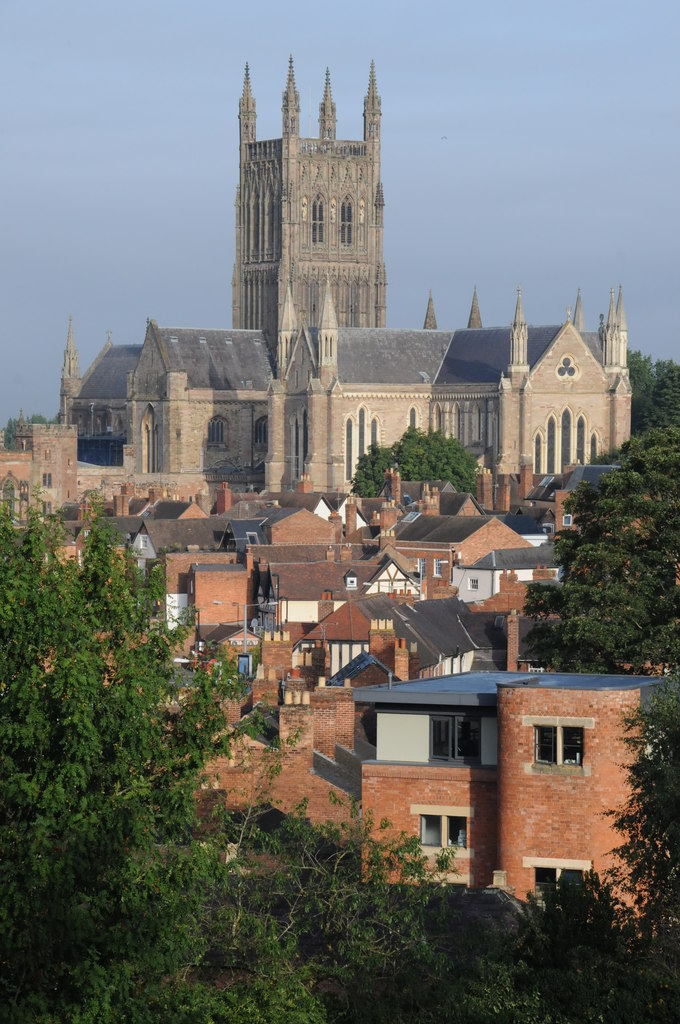
- Worcester Cathedral from Fort Royal Hill.
Date	21 May 1646 – 23 July 1646
Location	Worcester 52°11′20″N 2°13′15″W
Result	Parliamentary victory

Belligerents
Royalists	Parliamentarians

Commanders and leaders
Henry Washington Governor of Worcester	Edward Whalley (21 May – 8 July); Thomas Rainsborough (8 July – 23 July)

Strength
On 29 May 1,507 strong, excluding gentlemen volunteers and the city bands.	On 29 May the Royalists thought the besieging force was about 5,000 strong, but they may have been as few as 2,500
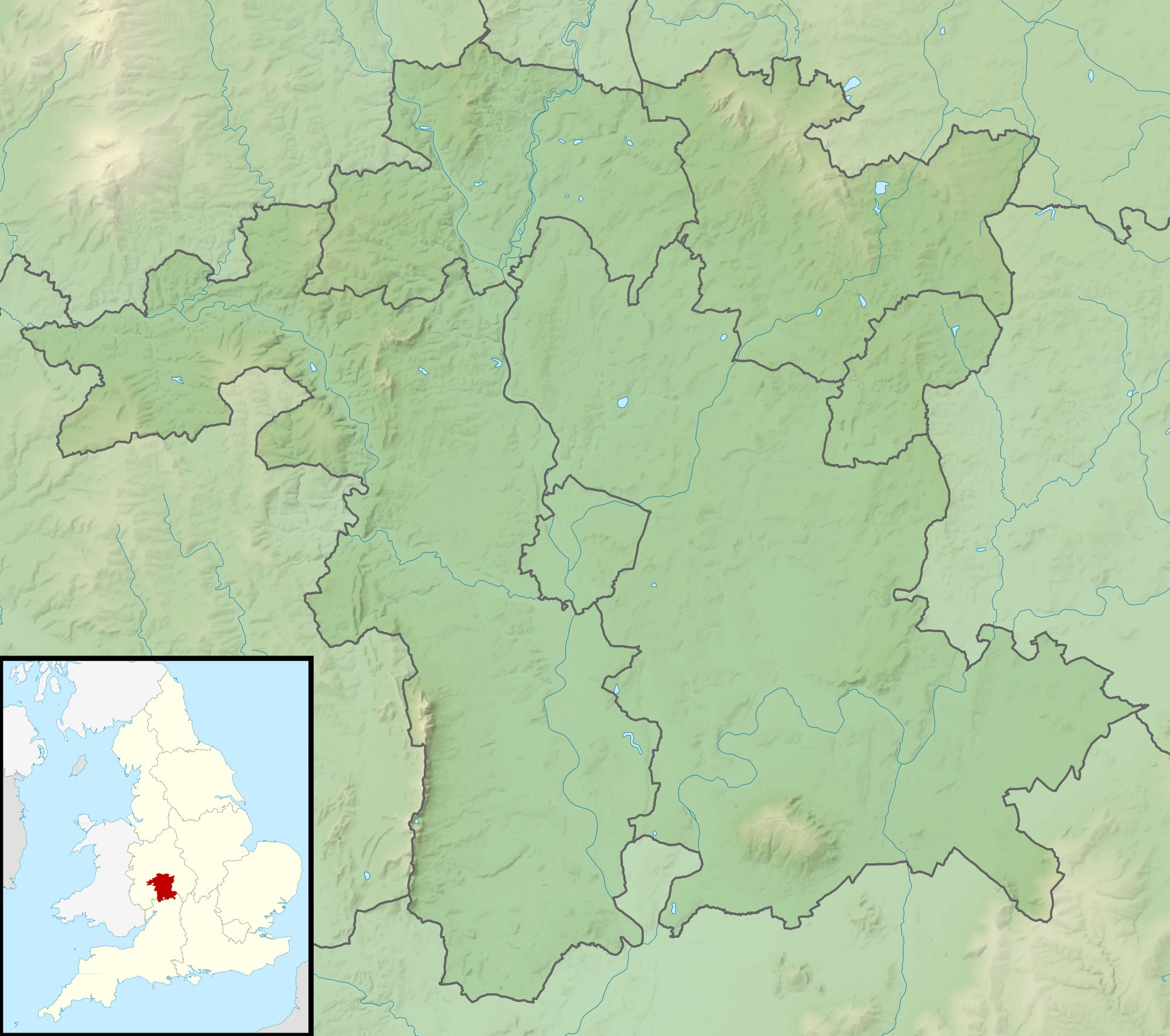
- Shown within Worcestershire

The second and longest siege of Worcester (21 May – 23 July 1646) took place towards the end of the First English Civil War, when Parliamentary forces under the command of Thomas Rainsborough besieged the city of Worcester, accepting the capitulation of the Royalist defenders on 22 July. The next day the Royalists formally surrendered possession of the city, and the Parliamentarians entered Worcester 63 days after the siege began.

== Prelude ==
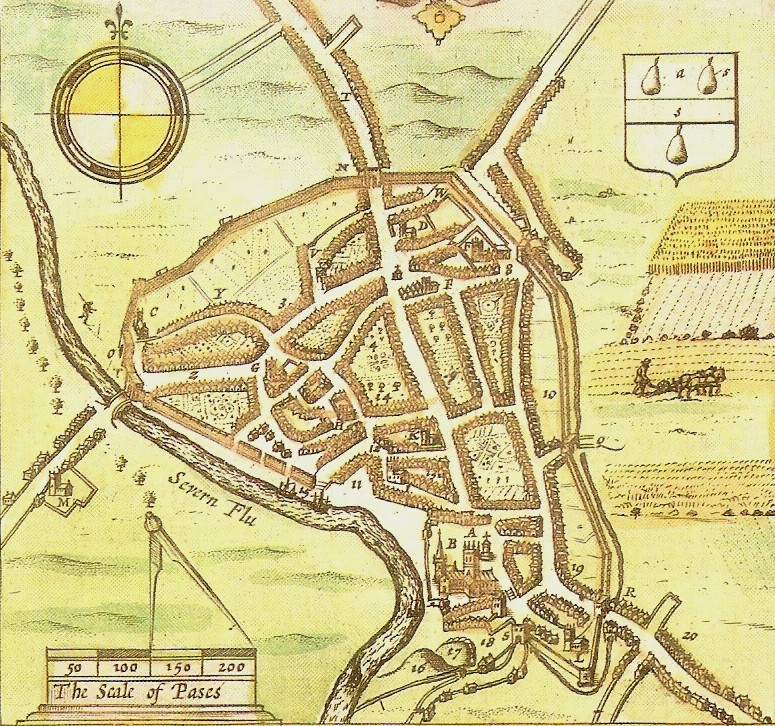
Worcester City and its walls from John Speed's The Counties of Britain, 1610

At the start of the English Civil War Worcester City walls were in a state of disrepair, and only part of the wall was defended by a ditch. There were seven gates: Foregate to the north, Saint Martin's and Friar's to the east, and Sidbury was the main southern gate—Frog Gate below Worcester Castle was also on the south side. On the western side (facing the Severn) there was Priory Gate overlooking the ferry and Bridge (or Water) Gate at the end of Newport Street that guarded the Severn bridge entrance to the city. The gates themselves were still opened in the morning and closed each evening, but they were rotten and in a bad state of repair ("so much so that they would hardly shut, and if they were actually closed there was neither lock or bolt to secure them").

Beginning at the north-west corner of the wall adjoining the river at the bottom of Newport Street, where the Bridge Gate stood, opening out on to the bridge, the wall ran along the river bank for a short distance so as to include St. Clement's Church, which then stood in the north-western angle of the wall. The walls then ran along the south side of the Butts. Continuing along the south side of Shaw Street, by the side of the Berkeley Hospital, it included that institution in the city. It crossed over Foregate Street just where the Hop Market Hotel stands. Here, at the corner of the street between the Berkeley Hospital and the Hop Market Hotel, the gate — the north, or Foregate— stood. The wall then continued along the south side of Sansome Street. (Note: This used, until some time in the 19th-century, to be called the "Town Ditch", but the inhabitants, not liking "Town Ditch" as an address, induced the city authorities to change it to the present unmeaning appellation of Sansome Street.) On reaching Lowesmoor it crossed over on the top of the hill and ran along the line just on the city centre side of City Walls Road (the A38) crossing Silver Street. Saint Martins Gate was located close to Corn Market and about where the roundabout is.

Passing along the back of New Street and Friar Street, where traces of it can still be seen in places, it reached Friar's Gate, which stood at the back of the old City Gaol, now the site of Laslett's Almshouse Charity, Union Street, formerly a Dominican House. The wall then went along at the back of Friar Street until it reached Sidbury. Here, just on the city side of the modern Sidbury Bridge over the canal, stood the main south gate of the city, the Sidbury Gate. The wall then ran south of Saint Peter's Church (Saint Peter's Street), across the site of the Porcelain Museum, until it reached the gate known as Frog Gate (on what was Frog lane and is now Severn Street). (Note: The location is marked by a plaque close to the entrance to the porcelain museum (Worcester City Walls 2005).) The wall then ran north-west joining onto a covered way that led to the Castle Hill. From this came another wall which ran down the lower part of Severn Street, until it reached the river (close to the Diglis House Hotel).

A new wall started here, turning up by the side of the river to the north. This was not, however, so strong or so important a wall as that on the other side of the city. Soon after the wall left the Diglis Hotel area, just below the cathedral, it reached the Priory Gate. From this the wall ran on to the end of Newport Street, where it joined the Bridge Gate.

It would appear that there was no ditch from this point to where the wall left the Foregate Street to Lowesmoor; at a later date an attempt was made to remedy this. Extra fortifications were placed on this part of the wall, but it always remained a weak spot in the city's defences.

Worcester was occupied by Sir John Byron on 16 September 1642, who was on his way to deliver wagons of silver plate from Oxford to the Charles I at Shrewsbury. Byron realising that he could not hold the Worcester with a Parliamentary army under the command of Earl of Essex already approaching city, he had sent a request to the King for additional forces to aid him. The Parliamentarians were aware of Byron's mission and an advanced force under the command of Colonel Nathaniel Fiennes arrived at the Sidbury Gate early on 22 September. What followed was typical of the inexperienced soldiery on both sides. The Parliamentarians were not challenged as they approached the gate and had they but known it they could have pushed it open and been into the town without difficulty. However they struck the gates with an axe which made a hole in it and then fired a musket through the hole. This aroused the lax Royalist guard who called out the Royalist garrison. The Parliamentarian assault team quickly withdrew. They then loosely invested the north of the city. In doing so they hoped to prevent Byron and his convoy leaving the city, which could be taken by Essex's main force in a day or so.

Prince Rupert was sent to escort Byron and his convoy onwards from Worcester. He attacked Fiennes's Parliamentary force at the Battle of Powick Bridge (23 September 1642), so allowing Byron's wagon-train to leave Worcestershire under Rupert's protection. Essex arrived in front of Worcester the next day with opposition his forces marched in. Essex and his army treated Worcester as a hostile city, officially for letting the Royalists in without a fight, but also due to their frustration at losing the convoy of silver and the Battle of Powick Bridge. Essex remained in Worcester for about a month before leaving with the bulk of his army for Warwickshire and on to the battle of Edgehill (23 October 1642). With the advance of the Royalist army from Edgehill towards London, most of Worcestershire was retaken by the Royalists, and Thomas Essex, the newly appointed Parliamentary governor, along with his garrison abandoned Worcester. Worcester was reoccupied by the Royalists in November 1642 and Sir William Russell was appointed governor. Worcester would remain in Royalist hands until 1646.

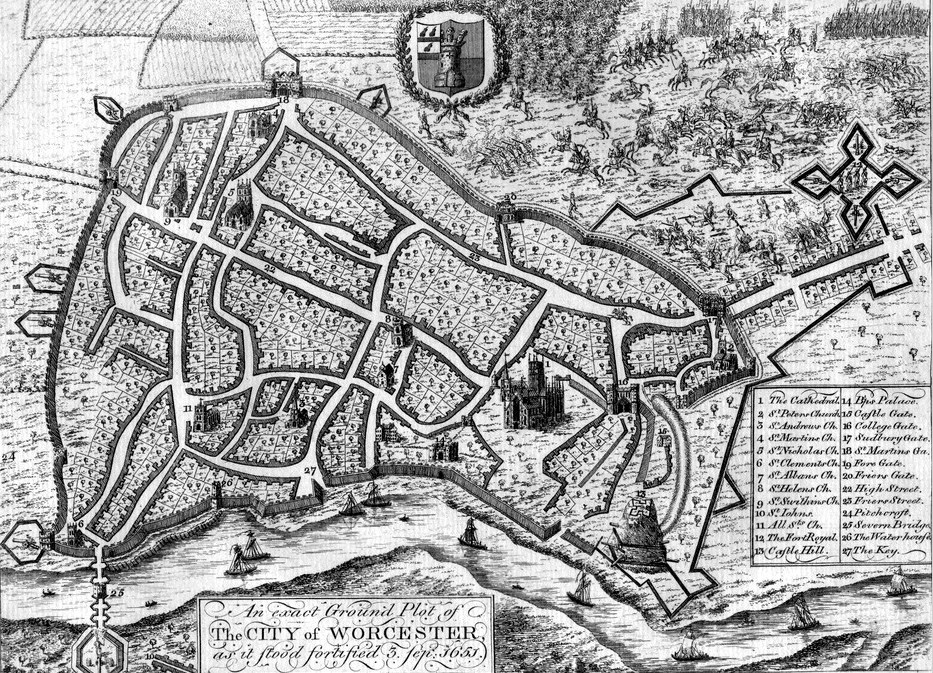
Worcester City defences (1651) showing civil war additions including the extensive works to the south and south-east (the map is aligned with east to the top) by Treadway Nash.

Once the Royalists had a secure hold on the city steps were taken to repair the walls and to fortify them against 17th century artillery. A sconce was built on the summit of Castle Hill, with cannons placed on platforms lower down the hill. Bastions were added to some of the walls and the ditch was extended. On the southern side of the city earthworks and ditches were dug outside the medieval walls.

The low hill to the south east that is now called Fort Royal was a problem for the city defenders, because from that location a besieger could set up artillery in a sconce and bombard the city walls. It was defiantly incorporated in to the city defences for the Battle of Worcester of 1651, and it was probably fortified and occupied by the garrison in 1646 siege. (Note: A plan of the 1646 defences by the Worcestershire Historic and Archaeology Service show a "Great Sconce" (rebuilt as Fort Royal in 1651) with earthworks connecting it to the city in the same locations as those on the plan of the City defences by Nash (1651), (Atkin 2004, location 2313).)

The historian J.W. Willis-Bund states that although Worcester, having regard to its position, commanded by hills on each side, could never have been a strong fortress, and would possibly in the opinion of contemporary Continental European engineers be spoken of with contempt as indefensible, yet most likely it was of about the same strength as most English local towns not built as fortresses.

After the Battle of Stow-on-the-Wold, the last pitched battle of the First English Civil War, fought on 21 March 1646, the victorious Parliamentary forces set about capturing the last of the Royalist strongholds.

Colonel Sir Thomson Morgan (who had been at Stow), as soon as possible after the Royalist defeat, sent his prisoners to Gloucester, and marched his force towards Worcester, accompanied by John Birch, the governor of Hereford and Sir William Brereton and their forces. They arrived in front of the Worcester on 26 March and summoned it to surrender Henry Washington, the governor, refused. The generals, stating they had not a force sufficient to undertake the siege, drew off to Droitwich but gave Washington notice that they only did this to give him full opportunity to learn his hopeless situation. Some sort of skirmish ensued, and Birch had a horse shot under him. The three Parliament leaders after summoning Worcester then broke up their joint forces. Morgan went to Raglan, Birch to Ludlow, and Brereton to Lichfield.

For a time Worcester was not attacked, and that time was employed by Washington in making plundering expeditions in order to get in supplies. One of the forays went as far as Evesham; this probably led Morgan to appoint Major William Dingley governor of that place.

Washington knew that a siege was certain; the date when it would begin was the only uncertainty. Accordingly, on 30 March, he began clearing the ground outside the walls to prevent any buildings giving shelter to a hostile attack. Saint Oswald's Hospital was pulled down, but Mr. Somers' house at the White Ladies, a large stone house, capable of accommodating 500 men, was for some reason spared. With the timber from the houses a store of fuel was laid up, and 1,000 loads of firewood were obtained from Shrawley Wood.

The Royalist garrisons in Worcestershire that were still holding out were Dudley, Hartlebury Castle, Madresfield Court, Strensham, and Worcester. No regular operations against any of them were begun for some little time, but there were continual skirmishes in the county; parties of Parliament men moving about, parties of Royalists collecting supplies. On 19 April 1646 there was a skirmish in front of Worcester, the record of which, appears in the Kidderminster parish register, where the burial of a soldier is mentioned, under that date:

John Jones, a Parliament soldier, slain at the skirmish at Worcester.

On 27 April, about midnight, Charles I left Oxford for the last time, disguised as a servant and after failing to rendezvous with a French agent, on 5 May, he surrendered to Alexander Leslie, Earl of Leven commander of the Scottish army in England that was encamped outside the heavily fortified town of Newark-on-Trent which the Scots were besieging.

On the King's arrival, Leven insisted that he should at once order Newark to be surrendered to the Parliament. Charles did so, sending an order to the governor, Lord Bellasis, to that effect. On 8 May Newark surrendered, the Royalist officers and soldiers marched home. The next day, 9 May, the Scots marched northward, taking Charles I with them. In four days (on 13 May) they reached Newcastle-on-Tyne, where they halted and remained. On 10 June 1646, Charles issued the following warrant:

To our truly and well-beloved Sir Thomas Glenham, Sir Thomas Tildesley, Colonel H. Washington, Colonel Thomas Blagge, Governors of our cities and towns of Oxford, Lichfield, Worcester, and Wallingford, and all the commanders of any town, castle, and fort in our Kingdom of England.

Charles R.

Having resolved to comply with the desires of our Parliament in everything which may be for the good of our subjects, and leave no means unessayed for the removing of all differences amongst us, therefore we have thought fit, the more to evidence the reality of our intentions of settling a happy and firm peace, to require you upon honourable terms to quit those towns, castles, and forts entrusted to you by us, and to disband all the forces under your several commands. :

Newcastle, 10th June, 1646.

The Parliamentary commanders had not waited for this order. On 1 May 1646, Thomas Fairfax, with the aid of Philip Skippon, who had recovered from his wounds at the Battle of Naseby, began his operations against Oxford. It may have been designed for effect that Skippon returned to his command on 1 May, the anniversary of the New Model Army taking the field. Before doing more at Oxford than driving in the outposts, Banbury was attacked, and surrendered on 6 May. Fairfax now sent off as many horse as he could spare to Worcester, under the command of Colonel Edward Whalley, to harry the garrison until such time as the army were at liberty to advance against it.

As was usual at this stage of the war, before a major town or fortress was reduced, the surrounding satellite garrisons would be reduced. So while steps were being taken as to Worcester, two of the other garrisons were disposed of. The first was Dudley Castle. At the beginning of May, Brereton moved up to attack. The governor of the castle, Thomas Leveson, expecting an attack, had prepared for it by clearing away all the buildings round the Castle that could shelter the enemy. Leveson surrendered the castle on 10 May.

These terms upon which he surrendered were as good as could be expected, so good that the Royalists said that the governor had been guilty of treachery. Insinuations were made that he was bribed but no evidence is forthcoming to support either charge. The Royalist cause was hopeless; there was no prospect whatever of relief, and those who surrendered first got the best terms. In this Leveson was shrewd.

Hartlebury Castle was the next Worcestershire garrison to be dealt with. Morgan advanced with a strong force against it, arriving before it on 9 May, he summoned it to surrender, Stating in his summons that it might well do so as far stronger castles, such as Newark and Banbury, had already capitulated. The Royalist governor Colonel William Sandys requested that he be given time to check that his was true as it meant he could expect no relief. Sandys' request appears to have been granted, for it was not until nearly a week later, on 14 May, that the place surrendered. The surrender was made on terms, and it included secret articles, one of which was that Morgan pledged himself to Sandys to use his best endeavours to secure that the sequestration of the Sandys' estate at Ombersley might be taken off without any composition, and on 7 January 1648 Morgan petitioned the House of Lords on Sandys' behalf. This deal for private interests of Sandys over those of the Royalists was seen by some Royalists still in the field as a betrayal.

The surrender of Hartlebury Castle left only three Royalist garrisons in the county, Worcester, Madresfield, and Strensham. As to the last it is not clear when the Parliament took it. In the articles of the surrender of Worcester it is provided that it be "disgarrisoned", but it does not state it was then in Royalists' hands, if it had been, probably more would have been said about it.

== Siege ==
=== May ===
On 13 May 1646, the Worcester garrison wrote to the King asking for his special instructions. On 16 May Fairfax wrote from Headington, near Oxford, to Washington, the Governor of Worcester, requiring him to surrender the city. Washington replied:

It is acknowledged by your books and by report out of your own quarters, that the King is in some of your armies. That granted, it may be easy for you to procure His Majesty's commands for the disposal of this garrison, till then I shall make good the trust reposed in me. As for conditions, if I shall be necessitated I shall make the best I can. The worst I know and fear not. If I had, the profession of a soldier had not been begun, or so long continued, by your excellence's humble servant.

Henry Washington.

This answer, as might have been foreseen, was at once followed by the arrival of some Parliament troops under Whalley. On 21 May they encamped on Wheeler's Hill, (Note: Both Willis-Bund and Atkin seem to use Rainbow Hill and Wheeler's Hill interchangeably and they could have been the same encampment as they are close together (Willis-Bund 1905, p. 190Atkin 2004, location 2339.) near Elbury Wood, and built huts. (Note: Probably close to or on what is now Gorse Hill and Elbury Mount Local Nature Reserve 52°12′3.996″N 2°11′34.786″W.) Washington at once made a sally with a small body of horse. This was repulsed by a large force which, following up the besieged, came under the fire of the town guns and suffered some loss.

Nothing was done on 22–23 May. On 24 May the besieged made a sally, fell on the Parliament foot about Rogers Hill, (Note: Rogers Hill, Worcester WR3 8JQ, 52°12′3.24″N 2°12′48.686″W.) killing and wounding at least 40.

On 25 May a summons to surrender was sent in to the Mayor, Aldermen, and Common Council of the city of Worcester. The next day an answer refusing was returned. The besiegers, on receipt of this, began to make a line of forts between Rogers Hill, and Wheeler's Hill, for security to lodge in and to enclose the city. Soldiers and townsmen complained of want of provisions.

On 27 May Colonel Whalley and the committee sent in a reply to the Mayor's answer.

On 28 May an accidental fire burnt the besiegers' huts.

On 29 May the garrison had a review. They found that their total strength was 1,507, beside gentlemen and the city bands. They computed the besiegers to be 5,000 strong. On the same day a parley took place, but without any satisfactory result. The governor sent out a foraging party to Astley. They returned, having taken six horses and two men.

On 31 May Whalley crossed the river and occupied Hallow, placing there, in Mr. Fleet's house, 140 foot and two troops of horse.

=== June ===
On 1 June the besiegers received further reinforcements from Ludlow.

On 2 June Whalley sent ten colours of foot down to Rogers Hill, to the new works there. A great iron culverin was placed on the St Martins Gate by the defenders, to dislodge the besiegers from Rogers Hill. It burst on discharge, wounding the chief engineer. A sortie was made against Hallow, but nothing came of it. It was said that a mistake was made in making an attack in front instead of sending the men round by the Broadheath to take the besiegers in the rear.

On 3 June the besiegers extended their works from Windmill Hill to Barbourne, (Note: Windmill Hill, now Green Hill Bath Road 52°11′9.358″N 2°12′58.928″W; Barbourne 52°12′4.518″N 2°13′30.896″W.) and thus on to the river. Some letters passed between the governor and the besiegers. The letter from the Parliamentarians is signed by Whalley, Thomas Rous, William Dingley, William Lygon, Edward Smith, Joseph Edgiock, and Henry Hunt; the list of signatures showing who the County Parliamentarians then were.

On 4 June the besiegers went on with their works at Barbourne, some skirmishing took place on Pitchcroft. This resulted in the besiegers bringing down next day 500 foot and 200 horse as a guard to protect their works. In the city a council of war was held. They ordered all shovels, spades, and mattocks to be seized and brought to certain named places. All the coal, wood, and lime in St Johns was brought into the city. All unnecessary people were sent out. A clearance round the walls, so as to make a road for cavalry to pass all round the town, was made. No one was allowed to enter or to leave without a pass. The next three days were quiet.

On 9 June the besiegers pushed on into Henwick (on the western side of the Severn by the Bromyard Road), and some as far as St Johns; one of their officers was killed. The next day a flag of truce was sent to ask for the body; it was given up, and escorted to the besiegers' lines by a number of gentlemen and a troop of horse. They were met by a number of the besiegers and drank wine together. Richard Baxter, the well known Kidderminster theologian, who was present with the besiegers, as chaplain to one of the regiments, utilised the occasion by discussing points of divinity with one of the Royalist chaplains, Dr. Thomas Warmestry. The first was "whether there is any difference between a church and any common place". After several hours' controversy the two divines are said to have parted good friends.

On 11 June, the besiegers began the bombardment with their great guns, some of the shots from which weighed 17, 19, 24, and 31 lb. One ball fell in the pantry of the Bishop's Palace. In the afternoon the guns the besiegers had placed at St Martins and the Blockhouse opened on the town, but did no damage. In their turn the besieged made a sortie against Henwick, but no result followed. The parliamentary artillery was directed by the mathematician and master gunner Nathaniel Nye, whose scientific approach to artillery was later detailed in his 1647 book The Art of Gunnery.

On 12 June, the besiegers occupied St Johns, lined the village with musketeers, and about 15:00 they placed a number of foot behind the church tower, hoping by this to complete the investment of the city to the west. But, to prevent this, at 23:00, a sortie in force of 500 foot and 200 horse was made to dislodge the besiegers from St Johns, and to destroy Cripplegate and the houses that gave shelter up to the bridge. The entrances to all the houses and streets were barricaded, but the Royalists, some by the highways, some by the backs of the houses, some by the courts and passages, drove the Parliamentarians out. Some of them fled into St Johns church, 100 of the besiegers were killed, 10 prisoners were taken, with three colours and a drum. The colours were hung up on the bridge and on the leaden steeple of the cathedral. On the same day The besiegers, opened fire on the town from St Johns and from the guns on Rainbow Hill. (Note: Rainbow Hill 52°12′5.180″N 2°12′36.655″W.) Some of the shots fell into the town, one on a bed in which persons were sleeping.

On 13 June all was quiet except a few shots which fell into the town, one of them killing a man and his wife as they lay in bed in a house in the Trinity. A good deal of barracking passed between the two sides. The besiegers called the garrison "Papists dogs", "Washington's bastards", "Russell's apes", and asked "Where is the King of you rogues?" and "Where is your tottering King?". The besieged retorted with "Traitors", "Villains", "Rogues to your King and Country", "The sons of a Puritan Bitch", "Go and preach in a crab tree", "Come and fetch their Colours which they lost", "Where are the Scots you hired to fight against the King?".

14 June was a quiet day except for occasional shots, one of which damaged Sir Rowland Berkeley's house in the Corn Market. The besiegers finished a bridge of boats they were making near the top corner of Pitchcroft, and threw up a breastwork on each side of the river to protect it.

Early in the morning of 16 June, Captain Hodgkins, or "Wicked Will", being very drunk, sallied out over the bridge to St Johns, attacked the guard of the besiegers, killed one, and came back in safety. He was so drunk he fell off his horse twice, and had to be taken back across the river in a boat. The guns the garrison placed on the quay kept up a fire on St Johns and killed four men at the back of the Swan Inn. All the south side of the town, beyond the Sidbury Gate, was still open to the garrison. They went out beyond the walls to make hay, which they brought in by the river, and turned out their cattle to graze.

On 16 June the besiegers paraded in full force, fired three volleys, and lit a bonfire in St Johns to induce the garrison to believe Oxford had surrendered (the actual surrender did not take place until 20 June, when the Princes Rupert and Maurice, who were in it, accepted passes to go abroad, which they did on 5 July 1646.

On 17 June thirteen guns were fired at St Martins Church and the Cross Inn. Whalley sent in a buck as a present to the governor. The citizens' wives and some of the citizen members of the council, urged the governor to treat. This Washington refused. He caused a foray to be made by the garrison towards Kempsey and Pirton, to bring in all the cattle they could catch. As the Irish soldiers in the garrison began to give trouble the governor's task was becoming more and more difficult. To better secure the defence he had the parapets of the bridge over the river raised and loopholed for muskets.

The siege of Worcester had been carried on for some time before anything was done about Madresfield. The Governor (Captain Aston) had been present at a council of war, at which he had stated that he could hold the place against all force for three months at least if mortar pieces were not brought against him. On 17 June Captain Aston sent a messenger (Captain Blinkow) to Colonel Washington, telling him he had been summoned that morning to deliver up the house, and asking his pleasure. Washington sent word back recalling Aston's promises, and told him that without any treaty he expected him to hold out for a month, promising that if in the meantime Worcester should be treated for Madresfield should be included in the treaty.

On 19 June the governor's footman was taken prisoner. The besiegers began throwing up new works in St Johns. All useless persons were made to leave the city. These numbered some 1,500, who it was said had only one meal a day. Another strong party was sent out to make a further foray, seize all the provisions they could collect, and compel persons to bring in whatever eatables they had. Report came to the place as to the hopelessness of resistance, and a female messenger was sent off to the King to learn his pleasure about the garrison continuing to resist. Complaints were made of the scarcity of bread, a scarcity arising not merely from the lack of flour but from the refusal of the bakers to bake, no less than sixteen flatly declining to do so. A cannonball hit the mayor's house.

On 20 June the garrison of Worcester learned that Aston had surrendered on dishonourable terms. Although the besieging Parliamentarians had no artillery, the owner of the house the Parliamentarian Colonel William Lygon had offered to pay Aston £200, his cavalry troopers 30s. and the foot soldiers 10s., if they would leave Madresfield without their arms. Aston had accepted the terms, so Worcester was now the only Royalist stronghold left in the county.

On 21 June, a Sunday, at about 13:00 the besiegers fired five cannons, but none were hurt. They fired four at about 17:00 and one more at 23:00. The last hit a poor house at the east end of the cathedral and splintered a bed. The occupants, a man his wife and 2 children who had slept in the bed the previous night had moved to other accommodation that day.

On 22 June the besiegers fired a cannon at 6:00. The governor tried to strengthen the defences on the north side the city wall, near Pitchcroft. In the part next to the Butts, between Foregate Street and St Clements Church, poles, rafters, cross-pieces and hurdles were fixed and the spaces filled up with earth and horse dung. The poles were at least 15 feet (4.6 m) high and 30 yards (27 m) long. The intention was to obscure the view of the top of walls so that the besiegers could not sweep defenders of the wall from their works at St Johns. However Townshend remarks that works like this should have been done before the siege started in earnest and that the wall between Forgate and this new work should haver been lined with earth at least 15 feet (4.6 m) thick from top to bottom. But as the wall was only lined with 6 feet (1.8 m) at the base that being an old weak wall it would be broken down with every shot. To still further carry out the investment the besiegers occupied Kempsey and Barneshall. (Note: Barneshall is now an area in Worcester on the south east bank of the Severn 52°10′17.713″N 2°12′55.372″W.)

On 23 June the force at Barneshall was much strengthened, the investment carried down to the river on the south side, and so completed. On that night, the city was once more summoned to surrender, and told of their hopeless condition as Oxford had fallen. This last news Washington refused to believe and asked leave to send a messenger to Oxford. On hearing of the summons the people pressed the governor to capitulate, but this he refused to do. On his refusal the besiegers began constructing new works at Battenhall, (Note: Battenhall is now an area in Worcester 52°10′45.685″N 2°12′19.336″W) so as to make the investment quite secure. An iron saker, at the Blockhouse burst, doing much damage. A piece of it, weighing 6olbs., fell on the "Rose and Crown," near St Helen's Church, and other pieces in Broad Street, wounding various persons. The garrison showed strong signs of insubordination, a good deal of plundering went on, much discontent prevailed, and the officers were not able, even if they were inclined, to check it.

On 25 June the governor had a list made of all the provisions in the town, so that some idea might be gained as to how long they could hold out. The besiegers hit upon an ingenious but cruel device to capture the city cows which were turned out to graze under the walls. They tied a cow to a stake, made a fire round it, so that the cow began to bellow. This, it was thought would bring the other cows to see what was the matter, and that then the besiegers could get between them and the city and so cut them off. The attempt, however, failed. A further letter came in from the besiegers, and on its being read a doubt was raised if Oxford had really surrendered but at night Prince Maurice's secretary, Anthony Kempson, who had been taken prisoner at Oxford, but had a pass given him, arrived, and told them that the fall of Oxford was true and it was utterly hopeless to look for relief.

On 26 June, Washington called a council of war, to meet at the Bishop's Palace, to consider their position and hear Kempson's statement. He told them they were in a hopeless state, as Fairfax, with 10,000 foot and 5,000 horse was marching on Worcester, so that they had better at once accept the best terms they could get. The council, on this, sent Kempson to see Whalley. He did so, and Whalley wrote offering to treat.

On 27 June another council was held to consider Whalley's letter, the result of their deliberations was the Washington sending the following letter:

Sir,

Upon overture of a treaty from you, intelligence of the delivery of Oxford, and the sight of His Majesty's letters there printed for the surrender of this garrison, amongst others, upon honourable terms, I have named the gentlemen underwritten to meet with those that are or shall be named by you for that purpose, and instead of hostages I am contented to take your engagement of honour, under your hand, for the safe conduct of those gentlemen and their necessary attendants. To-morrow being Sunday, unfit for business. I leave the time and place to your appointment.

Your servant,
Hen, Washington.
June 27th.
For Major-Gen. Whalley.

Considerable discussion arose as to who should be the negotiators. The military men named Sir Robert Leigh, Sir Jordan Crosland, Sir William Bridges, and Major Thomas Savage.

The gentlemen named Lord William Brereton, Sir Ralph Clare, Sir Rowland Berkeley, and Mr. Ralph Goodwin.

The citizens named Sir Daniel Tyas (who, as Mayor, had been knighted by Charles in 1644), Mr. Francis Street, the Town Clerk, Alderman Hacket, and Alderman Heming. To the last-named objection was taken, so Lieutenant Colonel Edward Soley was appointed in his place.

The clergy named Dr. Downe (or Dove) (Dean of Chichester), and Dr. Thomas Warmestry (son of the registrar of the diocese, and afterwards Dean of Worcester).

Mr, Fitzwilliam Coningsby, the head of the recusants and reformadoes, a man of good property in Herefordshire, objected to any idea of surrender until they heard from the King. Coningsby had been the Royalist Governor of Hereford, and he now considered it to be his duty to insist on "no surrender". Great heat ensued. Washington, who was a very passionate man, asked "if they would live and die with him upon the walls, and fight it out to the last man?". Coningsby said they would, and asked that all those who were not of the same mind should be thrown over the walls. The governor said it should be put to the vote whether they surrendered or not. This the bishop and the moderate men opposed, saying that the governor should hold a council of war and get the military reasons for what should be done.

Washington said he would do as he pleased, and proposed to break off all negotiations, and fire a gun from the walls himself to show that this was done. Swearing a great oath, he went off to do it, but the bishop and some others ran after, stopped him, and at last persuaded him to appoint six gentlemen, six soldiers, six citizens, together with the bishop and Dr. Warmestry, to decide if they should or should not treat.

After some debate, the committee were unanimous to treat, and the governor's letter was sent. Whalley replied:

Sir,

Since our proposed treaty is condescended to by you, and the time and place left to me, I desire your commissioners would give the gentlemen under-written a meeting at Hindlip House, belonging to Mr. Abingdon, on Monday morning, 10 o'clock. I do hereby engage myself for the safe coming and returning of them. I except against Lieut.-Colonel Soley as a citizen, being also a soldier.

I rest, you servant,

Edward Whalley. June 27th, 1646.

Hostages:

- For soldiers and citizens: Colonel Bridges, Colonel Dingley, Colonel Starr, Colonel Lygon, Colonel Betsworth, Lieut.- Colonel Torkington, Major Fiennes, Major Hungerford. (Note: Alternative spellings: Colonel Ligon and Colonel Turkenton)
- For the gentry: Sir Thomas Rous, Mr. Lechmere, Mr. Hunt and Mr. Moore.
- For the ministry: Mr. Moore and Mr. Richard Baxter.

An armistice was agreed upon. The Royalist governor, Washington, sent to Colonel Dingley, with whom he had served in the Low Countries, to meet him outside the city in the Foregate where they met many other friends and drank until 22:00. This act of the governor's was much censured, as it encouraged others to go out of the garrison and allowed the besiegers to come within pistol shot of the works.

On 28 June, the Parliamentarians on Windmill Hill, on the south of the town, came down and examined the works, and at the Foregate many on both sides met and conversed. In the afternoon the articles of the treaty were sent in and read. This caused violent scenes between the governor and the officers.

On 29 June, Whalley, who was at Hallow, sent a safe conduct for the negotiators to come then to Mrs. Fleet's house. A dispute arose as to whether there should be a cessation of hostilities during the negotiations for surrender. At last Whalley wrote the governor the following letter:

The kingdom is at great layings out after you and the city, and much increased by the addition of forces. I intend to be a good husband for you, and not to lose time, which may be improved by the reducing Worcester, therefore give you notice the cessation is at an end.

Your Servant
Edward Whalley.

At this the Royalist governor, Washington was nettled. He at once set a cannon and fired it himself, and the city's guns began a regular cannonade, which killed some of the besiegers.

The Royalist governor, Washington, sent a trumpeter for the negotiators to meet. This was agreed, and Whalley sent attendants to meet the negotiators in St Johns. When the Parliament negotiators read the proposed terms of surrender, Colonel Bridges said they were terms for men if the King had his towns, castles, and armies, not for such as were the only city left, and were actually better terms than had been given to Oxford or any other place, and could the Worcester garrison, expect better terms for their obstinacy?

Sir Ralph Clare said sooner than surrender on dishonourable terms they would see the city and the garrison in ashes. Colonel Betsworth said it was better in ashes than received on such terms. Colonel Bridges said the Parliament forces would lay all their bones under the walls rather than agree to such terms.

=== July ===
On 2 July 1646 an attempt was made to capture Colonel Betsworth, who was quartered at Kempsey, but the party were delayed, as it was a dark, wet night. Betsworth got word and escaped, and all the result of the sortie was to capture five horses and men.

By 4 July things were going badly with the city. There was great difficulty in maintaining discipline, or keeping the troops at their posts. On that day some four troopers came up from Mrs. Andrews, at Barnshall, under the Diglis works, and drove away seven head of cattle, as no sentinel was on guard. In the afternoon 30 horse came within carbine shot of the sconce (on Castle Hill), but there was no guard. One man who was there picked up a musket and shot a gentleman of note, whose body the Parliament compounded for.

On 5 July the Roundheads again came up against the sconce, and a sharp skirmish took place, which ended in the besiegers drawing off.

On 6 July Captain Hodgkins ("Wicked Will") made a sally, behaved most gallantly, and brought in seven prisoners.

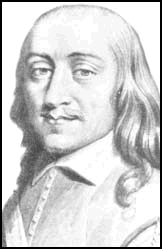
Colonel Thomas Rainsborough

On 8 July Washington gave public notice he must open the magazine, which was done. Whalley's connection with the siege ended, and Colonel Thomas Rainsborough was appointed to take over the command.

On 9 July Rainsborough held a general review of the besieging force on Rainbow Hill or Wheeler's Hill. Thirty-one carriages, ten of which were ordnance, were drawn up at Barbourne House.

On 10 July the besiegers joined up their works from Perry Wood (Note: Perry Wood Nature Reserve 52°11′24.317″N 2°11′52.937″W.) to Red Hill Cross. One of the shots hit Edgar Tower, a long mile from the works. The Roundhead besiegers made an effort to raise a new fort on Wall's furlong, but after some fighting with the Cavaliers they failed. Tents were set up at Barbourne House, which was Rainsborough's headquarters. Rainsborough opened a fresh negotiations and civil messages passed between Rainsborough and Washington. The Cavaliers strengthened their works on Castle Hill. They placed two brass field pieces on the top of the tower commanding Windmill Hill to answer the new works there, and at the Knowie, nearer Mrs. Andrews', where the Roundheads had been erecting further batteries. Within Worcester provisions were becoming scarce. Fresh meat — beef, mutton, and veal— sold at 8d. per lb. Sir John Knotsford gave 30s. for a piece of roasting beef.

On 11 July, the fire from Rogers Hill caused great annoyance. One ball hit the Town Hall and rolled to the Earl's post, a distance of 40 yards (37 m) Another hit Mr. Street's (the Town Clerk's) house.

On 13 July the Royalist defenders strengthened the works on Castle Hill.

On 15 July a small brass gun was placed on the top of the cathedral, which Henry Townshend states was done to "gall" the besiegers. Rainsborough sent in a letter offering to negotiate. Washington consented to negotiate on honourable terms, and a cessation of hostilities was agreed upon.

On 16 July the negotiations went on. A private letter intimated they might have honourable terms, but the gentry and soldiers said they should hold out to the last, so that, as Worcester had been the first city to declare for the King, it should be the last to give up his cause. The negotiations went on, the besieged insisting that Whalley should not be appointed governor if there was a surrender.

On 18 July Rainsborough sent in his terms "Articles of agreement for the surrender of the garrison of Worcester", saying they were final. On this it was proposed to fight it out, but Washington told them if it came to a storm he had only powder to last an hour's fight, but he was quite willing to hazard his own person. The mayor called a common council of the citizens to discuss the terms, and they agreed to accept terms if they were the best to be got.

Goodwin urged that by the articles of Oxford all other garrisons were entitled to as good terms, but these were in some of the details worse, and expressly objected to the exception of Sir William Russell as something quite unheard of.

Rainsborough replied that Worcester had lost the benefit of the Oxford articles by continuing to fight and not surrendering. He refused to alter the articles, or to give more than two days for the surrender.

On Washington finding that the citizens would not fight, he informed the gentlemen and officers that he had only three barrels of great powder for ordnance, five barrels of musket powder, and one of pistol powder left, scarcely enough for one day's hot service and storming for 3,000 men; that during the cessation of hostilities many of the men had deserted; that the provisions would not last above a fortnight; that no help could be looked for from the King. On this it was decided to accept the terms. Accordingly, Washington wrote consenting to the terms, and agreeing to surrender on the 22nd, but begging to be allowed to send a messenger to Fairfax to try and get better conditions.

A number of the officers and gentlemen protested against Sir William Russell being excepted, saying it was consenting to his murder, and it was almost unheard of to except anyone. It had only been done in the Bridgnorth case, which differed from this. Washington asked if the whole city and all the people in it were to be destroyed for one man's benefit? Russell cut the matter short, saying he should walk out and surrender himself, saying that: "He neither feared nor cared what the enemy could do unto him; he had but a life to lose, and it could not be better spent".

The gentlemen, however, determined to send a letter to Fairfax, asking that Russell should not be exempted from the terms of the surrender. This the citizens opposed. While they were disputing Rainsborough wrote to Washington stating that he would not allow a letter to be sent to Fairfax, but he would allow delegates chosen Washington to travel to Fairfax's headquarters to witnesses Fairfax counter signing the articles of surrender.

On 20 July, Sir Edward Littleton and Sir William Bridges went to Rainsborough's quarters to see him sign the agreement.

On 22 July, the troops in St Johns burnt their huts and marched off. The Parliamentary Committee took up their quarters in the gentlemen's houses round who were their friends. Heath arrived from Sir Thomas Fairfax with an assurance they should have large passes and protection sent them next day; that Sir William Russell should be treated as a gentleman, and should be Rainsborough's prisoner.

23 July was the last day of the siege. The cathedral organ had already been taken down, but at 6:00 a service was held in the cathedral, the last Anglican service held there for 14 years. It was largely attended by gentlemen and officers, and was for many of them the last time they were ever to hear service said according to the use of the Church of England. This over, Washington, at the head of his own regiment, Sir William Russell's regiment, and the remainder of Colonel Sandys' regiment, under Major Moore, marched out to the Round Mount, on Rainbow Hill, the place Rainsborough had fixed for the formal ceremony. With them came the civilians: the Earl of Shrewsbury and his son, Lord Talbot, from Grafton; Sir Edward Littleton, Sir Edward Barrett, of Droitwich; Henry Townshend, of Elmley Lovett; Edward Penel, of Woodson; Anthony Langston, of Sedgeberrow; Edward Sheldon, of Beoley; Sir Martyn Sandys, of Worcester; Joseph Walsh, of Abberley Hall; Thomas Russell, of Little Malvern; William Habington, of Hindlip; John Prideaux, Bishop of Worcester; the Sheriff of Worcestershire (Henry Ingram, of Earls Court); Sir William Russell, of Strensham; Sir Rowland Berkeley, of Cotheridge; Sir John Winford, of Astley; Henry Bromley, of Holt; Thomas Acton, of Burton; Thomas Hornyold, of Biackmore; Robert Wylde, of the Commandery; John Cockes, of Crowle; Major Thomas Wylde, Major John Ingram, Colonel Herbert Prior, of Pedniore; George Acton, William Walsh, of Abberley Hall; George Welch, Thomas Berkeley, of Spetchley; William Langston, of Henley (? Hanley); French, of Pershore, and John Lane, alderman of the city.

Some hitch occurred; the Cavaliers arrived at Rainbow Hill at 10:00, but there were no passes. So they had to wait until the passes arrived; the time elapsed but no passes came. At last, at 13:00, they were received. Then they were handed to Hugh Peters, a fanatical puritan minister, whom the Royalists hated with the bitterest hatred, to distribute. The choice of such a person could not have made for order or peace. Each man was asked if he promised not to bear arms against the Parliament, and if he gave the promise then, but not until then, was his pass handed over to him. On receipt of the passes they marched off. (Note: When five years later when these gentlemen were called upon to rally to King Charles II's cause, many believed that they could not because they would have deliberately broken their parole given at the end of this siege, for rightly or wrongly the promise given was general, not confined to the First English Civil War (Willis-Bund 1905, p. 194).)

At about 17:00 Rainsborough entered Worcester. He had already sent in some of his troops, and he thus finished the first Civil War, so far as Worcestershire went.

Although the article of surrender included a provision that the garrison should be allowed to leave with their personal arms and possessions, Thomas Fairfax wrote to the Speaker of the House of Commons reporting that Major-General Massey's horse "have made a most dishonourable breach upon the articles of Worcester, by plundering and violating those that marched out of that city". This action among others cause Parliament to order the disbandment the regiment.

== Aftermath ==
No time was lost in getting rid of the besieging army. It was determined to retain in Worcestershire only one regiment of foot, 100 horse, and some dragoons, as a guard for the sheriff. The rest were marched off into other Counties.

Although the fighting was over, Worcester was made to feel the heavy hand of the conqueror. On 24 July Rainsborough ordered all arms to be brought in on pain of death; all Royalist soldiers to depart the city within ten days; and that, while in the town, no Royalist should wear a sword. Having disarmed the citizens the committee got to work the next day, 25 July, by beginning to make an inventory of all estates, demanding a contribution of 25 per cent. Any man they pleased to call so became a delinquent, and was "then so squeezed that he could not recover in an age".

The committee consisted of Sir Thomas Rous; Nicholas Lechmere, of Hanley; Daniel Dobyns, of Kidderminster; Colonel William Lygon, of Madresfield; John Egiock, of Feckenham; Major Richard Salwey, second son of Humphrey Salwey, of Stanford; Captain Thomas Milward, of Alvechurch; Thomas Cookes, of Bentley; William Moore, of Alvechurch; Major Edward Smith, William Collins, of King's Norton; William Younge, of Evesham; John Younge, servant to Lord Brooke; John Fownes, of Dodford Priory; John Giles, of Astley; Colonel William Dingley, governor of Evesham.

The prisoners Parliament took and obliged to compound included among others: Sherington, Talbot, of Salwarp; Edward Vernon, of Hanbury; Philip Brace, of Dovedale; John Washborne, of Wichenford; Francis Finch, of Rushock; Sir Thomas Lyttelton, late governor of Bewdley; Edward Sheldon, of Beoley, a condition of whose composition was that he should stay at home; Mrs. Pakington, of Harvington, who had leave to stay at home. Sir John Pakington, of Hampton Lovett, who was the then member for Aylesbury; and Sir Henry Herbert, of Ribbesford, who was then member for Bewdley, voluntarily went and compounded.

The committee got rapidly to work. They first dealt with the Mayor of Worcester (Mr. Eviits):

By the committee of the county and city of Worcester it is ordered that M. Evet, the malignant mayor of Worcester, be confined to his house, and the sword, mace, and seal of the corporation, in possession of the mayor, be seized on and delivered to this committee, and that M. Writer and M.John Tilt signify this order to the mayor and demand the sword and other the above mentioned implements of magistracy.

It was as conquerors that the task was carried out. The Worcestershire Royalists were made to feel that they were the conquered. There was no more fighting. The time was spent in fining, compounding, sequestrating. So far as war was concerned there was a lull. There was to be no more fighting within the borders of Worcestershire for the next five years (until the Worcester Campaign of the Third Civil War).
