= Commandery (disambiguation) =

A commandery is an administrative district and may refer to:

- Commandery, an administrative level of a European military order
- Commandery, also jun, an historical administrative level of China
- The Commandery, an historic building in the city of Worcester, England
- A division found within the York Rite of Freemasonry
