= Robert Holborne =

English lawyer and politician

Sir Robert Holborne (died 1647) was an English lawyer and politician, of Furnival's Inn and Lincoln's Inn (where he was bencher and reader in English law). He acted, along with Oliver St John, as co-counsel for John Hampden in the ship money case. He sat in the House of Commons between 1640 and 1642 and supported the Royalist cause in the English Civil War. He was attorney-general to the Prince of Wales, being knighted in 1643. He also published legal tracts.

== Biography ==
Holborne was the son of Nicholas Holbone of Chichester. His mother was, perhaps, Anne, sister of John Lane. Holborne was married (1630-1633) to the Lady Anne Dudley, granddaughter of the famous Robert Dudley, 1st Earl of Leicester. Lady Anne was one of the abandoned daughters and co-heirs of Sir Robert Dudley, formally of Kenilworth Castle, Warwickshire, and Alice Dudley, Duchess of Dudley. It has been suggested this relationship may have influenced his initial anti-Court reputation.

He was trained for the law, as the custom then was, at Furnival's Inn, before proceeding to Lincoln's Inn, where he entered 9 November 1615, and subsequently became a bencher and reader in English law there. He was early distinguished in practice at the king's bench, and his opinion was taken by John Hampden in regard to ship-money. In the great case he was one of Hampden's counsel, and supplied what Oliver St John had omitted in an elaborate argument which lasted for three days, 2–5 December 1637.

In April 1640 Holborne was elected Member of Parliament for Southwark in the Short Parliament. In November 1640, he was elected MP for St. Michael, Cornwall, in the Long Parliament. While in the house he spoke strongly in favour of the power of convocation to bind the laity, in so far as the canons did not conflict with the law of the land.

Holborne separated himself still further from his party by the fight he made against Strafford's attainder. When King Charles I went to Oxford, Holborne joined him there, and on 7 February 1642 was created D.C.L. while he was disabled from sitting in the parliament at Westminster in 1642. The King made him attorney-general to the Prince of Wales, and on 19 January 1643 he was knighted. His estate was sequestrated by Parliament. He died in 1647, and was buried in Lincoln's Inn Chapel on 16 February of that year.

== Bibliography ==
Holborne wrote:

1. The Reading in Lincolnes Inne, Feb. 28 1041, vpon the Statute . . . of Treasons, Oxford, 1642, 4to: reiessued with Bacon's 'Cases' in 1681.
2. The Freeholders Grand Inquest touching our souveraigne Lord the King and his Parliament, London, 1647, 4to; a pamphlet upon constitutional questions.

He also edited William Tothill's Transactions of the High Court of Chancery, London, 1649, 8vo.

The authorship of The Freeholders is usually attributed to Robert Filmer by Peter Laslett, but contemporary historian Anthony Wood attributed it to Robert Holborne.

== Notes ==
Parliament of England
Vacant Parliament suspended since 1629	Member of Parliament for Southwark; 1640; With: Richard Tuffnell	Succeeded by Edward Bagshawe; John White
Preceded by William Chadwell; John Arundell	Member of Parliament for St. Michael; 1640–1642; With: William Chadwell	Succeeded by William Chadwell
