= Chapel of St. Gudwal =

Ruined Norman chapel in Worcester

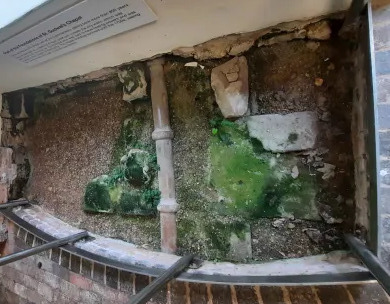
- Surviving ruins of the chapel in 2024

- Location within Worcestershire
- Interactive map of Chapel of St. Gudwal

Monastery information
- Full name: Chapel of St. Gudwal
- Established: 950s
- Disestablished: 1540

People
- Founders: Dunstan, Bishop of Worcester

Site
- Location: The Commandery, Worcester
- Coordinates: 52.187903°N 2.216755°W
- Visible remains: Ruins
- Public access: Paid access

The Chapel of St. Gudwal was a Saxon and later Norman chapel located within the grounds of The Commandery, Worcester that was dedicated to St. Gudwal. Today, only ruins of the foundations exist.

== History ==
The Chapel of St. Gudwal was built outside of the Worcester city walls by Dunstan, Bishop of Worcester during the 950s. The Hospital of St. Wulfstan was then constructed around 1085 around the site of the Chapel of St. Gudwal.

The Hospital of St. Wulfstan and the Chapel of St. Gudwal were purchased by Richard Morysyne in 1539 and were then dissolved by Henry VIII in 1540 as one of the last monastic buildings to be dissolved across England; the chapel was stripped of its valuables and was left in ruin.

It is believed that the last remnants of the chapel were demolished during the 18th century by the Wylde family.

=== Excavations ===
The Commandery was excavated between 2004 and 2006, and the site of the Chapel of St. Gudwal was identified and excavated in 2006 alongside two buried skeletons discovered two years before, including a male who died around the age of fifty.

The site contained several of the foundation stones, which still bear the mason's marks of the craftsmen that made them, and the chapel ruins are currently on public display in situ within The Commandery museum.
