= Fort Royal (disambiguation) =

Fort Royal (or Fort Royale) may refer to:

- Fort Royal, a fortification and former prison on Île Sainte-Marguerite
- Fort-de-France, the capital of Martinique
- Fort Saint Louis (Martinique), a fortification at Fort-de-France
- Fort Royal (Newfoundland), a fortification in Canada
- Fort-Liberté, a fortification in Haiti
- Fort Frederiksborg, a fort in Ghana
- St. George's, Grenada, capital of Grenada (former name)

== See also ==
- Fort Royal Hill, a park (and former fort) in England
