= Commandery =

Administrative land division of a military order

In the Middle Ages, a commandery (rarely commandry) was the smallest administrative division of the European landed properties of a military order. It was also the name of the house where the knights of the commandery lived. The word is also applied to the emoluments granted to a commander. They were the equivalent for those orders to a monastic grange. The knight in charge of a commandery was a commander.

== Etymology ==
The word derives from French commanderie or commenderie, from mediaeval Latin commendaria or commenda, meaning 'a trust or charge', originally one held in commendam.

Originally, commanderies were benefices, particularly in the Church, held in commendam. Mediaeval military orders adopted monastic organizational structures and commanderies were divisions of the Order of Knights of St. John of Jerusalem, and later the Order of Teutonic Knights and other knightly orders were organized along similar lines. The property of the order was divided into priorates (or priories), subdivided into bailiwicks, which in turn were divided into commanderies or commendæ; these were placed in charge of a commendator or commander. The word is also applied to the emoluments granted to a commander of a military order of knights.

A commandery of the Teutonic Knights, each headed by a Komtur, was known as a Komturei or Kommende. The equivalents among the Knights Templar were preceptor and preceptory. In 1540, the possessions in England of the Knights Hospitaller - the commanderies to which the English term first referred - were seized as crown property.

== Usage ==
=== Modern ===
- A territory of the Venerable Order of Saint John
- A division of the Knights Templar, found within the York Rite of Freemasonry.
- A chapter of the Military Order of Foreign Wars.

=== Medieval ===
In the Near East and throughout Europe:

- A territory of the Order of St John of Jerusalem, the Knights Hospitallers
- A territory of the Order of Teutonic Knights and other orders
- The Commandery, an historic building in the city of Worcester, England, probably built by Knights Hospitallers.

== See also ==
- Commandaria
- In Commendam
- Encomienda
