= John White (Welsh lawyer) =

Welsh lawyer and politician (1590–1645)

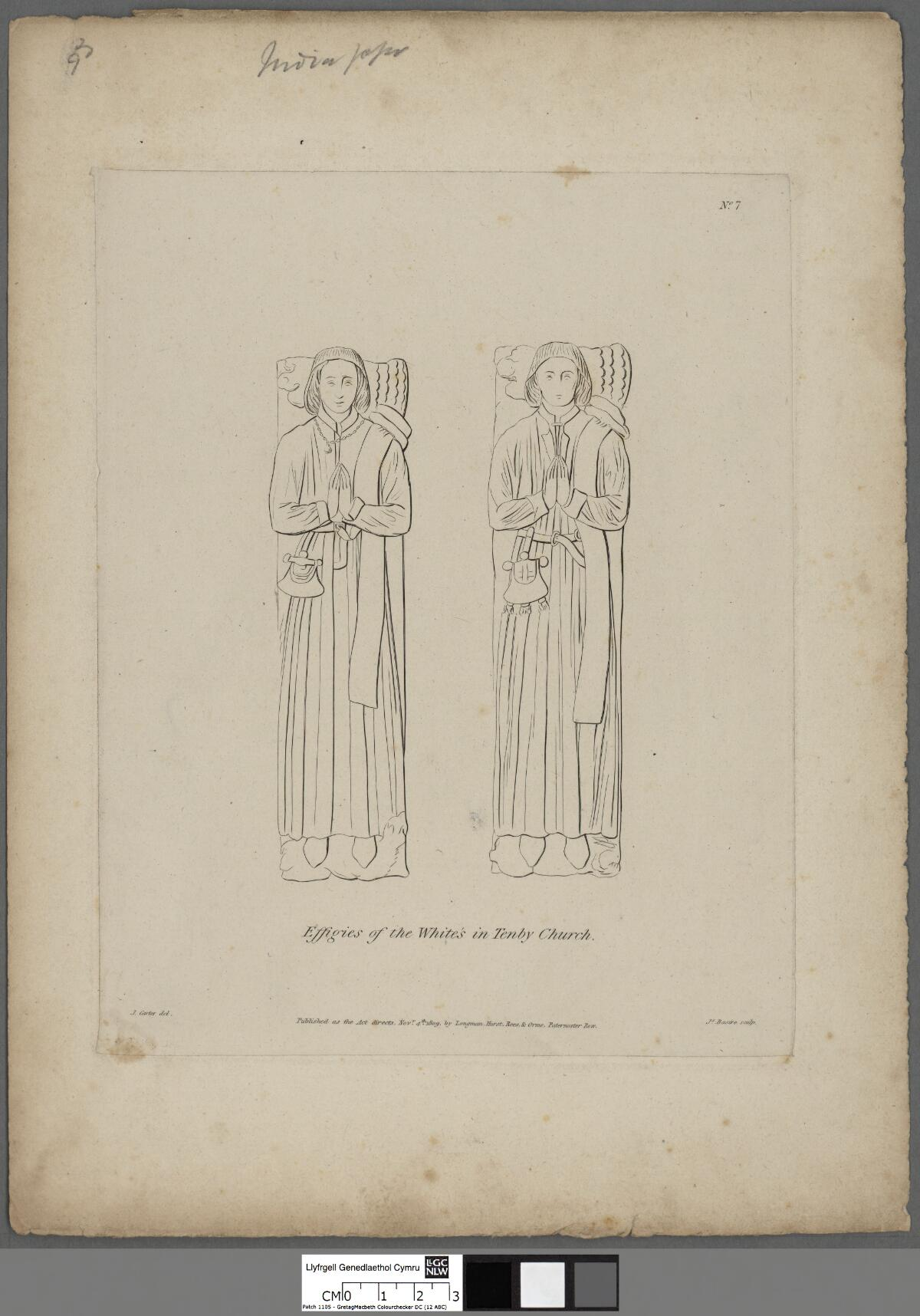
Portrait of Effigies of the White's in Tenby Church

John White (1590 – 29 January 1645) was a Welsh lawyer and politician who sat in the House of Commons from 1640 to 1645. His work The first Century of Scandalous Malignant Priests (1643) earned him the nickname "Century White".

== Life ==
White was from a family of merchants from Tenby, Pembrokeshire, Wales. He was the second son of Henry and Jane (née Fletcher) White. He matriculated (together with his elder brother Griffith) at Jesus College, Oxford in 1607.

He entered the Middle Temple in 1610 and was called to the bar in 1626. He was High Sheriff of Pembrokeshire in 1626, like his father and grandfather before him.

In 1632 White represented Sir Matthew Brend when a bill of complaint was filed in the Court of Requests on behalf of Cuthbert Burbage and the representatives of the other original lessees of the Globe Theatre, seeking an extension of their lease.

In November 1640, White was elected Member of Parliament for Southwark in the Long Parliament. In 1643 he was appointed chairman of the Committee for Plundered Ministers.

White died in 1645 and was buried in the Temple Church. He had married three times: firstly Janet, the daughter of John ap Griffith Eynon of Jeffreston, Pembrokeshire; secondly Winifred daughter of Richard Blackwell of Bushey, Herts with whom he had nine children; thirdly Mary the eldest daughter of Thomas Style of Little Mussenden, Bucks.

== Notes ==
Parliament of England
Preceded by Robert Holborne; Richard Tuffnell	Member of Parliament for Southwark; 1640–1645; With: Edward Bagshawe	Succeeded by George Thomson; George Snelling
