= Peter Courtney (MP) =

English politician

Sir Peter Courtney (c. 1616 – c. April, 1670) was an English politician who sat in the House of Commons in 1640 and in 1660. He fought for the Royalist cause in the English Civil War.

Courtney was the son of Edward Courtney of Ladock, Cornwall, and his wife Elizabeth Gorges daughter of Tristram Gorges of Butshead, St Budeaux, Devon. He matriculated at Exeter College, Oxford on 21 June 1633, aged 16 and was admitted to Lincoln's Inn in 1636. He settled at Trethurfe, Cornwall.

In April 1640, Courtney was elected Member of Parliament for Mitchell in a double return for the Short Parliament. He was knighted at York on 28 June 1642 after a hazardous ride from Cornwall to tell the King that he had the good affection of the Cornish people. During the Civil War he served under Sir Bevil Grenville. He compounded for a fine of £346 in 1648. In 1650, he was a member of the Western Association and was ready to serve on any insurrection. He claimed he had lost £7,000 and been imprisoned seven or eight times during the Commonwealth.

Following the Restoration Courtney was granted the farm of Cornish tin customs which was then rescinded when it was found someone else had an earlier grant. In October 1660, he was elected Member of Parliament for Tregony in the Convention Parliament.

Courtney petitioned for a pension in 1665 in view of his losses in the Royalist cause, but nothing was done. His will was proved in 1670.

Courtney married firstly Alice Rashleigh, daughter of Jonathan Rashleigh of Menabilly Cornwall, and had a son and four daughters. He married secondly Amy Courtney, daughter of Peter Courtney of Penkivel, Cornwall. He had a son William and a daughter Alice who married Humphrey Courtney.

Parliament of England
Vacant Parliament suspended since 1629	Member of Parliament for Mitchell; 1640; With: William Chadwell; Francis Basset; Samuel Cosworth	Succeeded by William Chadwell; John Arundell
