= Edward Bagshaw (MP) =

English writer and politician

Edward Bagshaw (or Bagshawe) the elder (ca. 1589 – 1662) was an English writer and politician who sat in the House of Commons from 1640 to 1644. He supported the Royalist cause in the English Civil War.

Bagshaw was the son of Edward Bagshaw, of the City of London. He matriculated at Brasenose College, Oxford on 22 February 1605, aged 15 and was awarded BA on 7 July 1608. His tutor was Robert Bolton, a puritan writer, whose life was subsequently written by Bagshaw. He was called to the bar at Middle Temple in 1615 and was Lent reader in 1640. As Reader, he delivered two discourses to the effect that 'a parliament may be held without bishops,' and that 'bishops may not meddle in civil affairs.' The lectures attracted the notice of William Laud, and Bagshaw was prohibited from continuing them.

These proceedings gained Bagshaw some popularity and in November 1640 he was elected Member of Parliament for Southwark in the Long Parliament. On the outbreak of the Civil War, he joined the King's party at Oxford and sat in the King's parliament there. As a result, he was disabled from sitting in the Parliament at Westminster on 22 January 1644. He was taken prisoner by the Parliamentary forces and was sent to the King's Bench prison at Southwark on 29 June 1644. While imprisoned, he composed the greater number of his works. He was released in 1646. He became a bencher of his inn and in 1660 became treasurer of Middle Temple.

Bagshaw died in 1662 on 12 September or October, and was buried in the church at Moreton Pinkney, in Northamptonshire, near where his property lay.

== Writings ==
His writings include:

- Life and Death of Mr. Robert Bolton London, 1633.
- Editions of three of Bolton's works, 1633-35-37.
- Several speeches in parliament, viz. (1) on 9 Nov. 1640, (2) on 9 Feb. 1640 (1641); Concerning Episcopacy, 18 Feb. 1640 (1641); 12 Jan. 1641 (1642), The Trial of the Twelve Bishops.
- Two arguments in parliament, viz. (1) Concerning the Canons, (2) Concerning the Præmunire on these Canons.
- Treatise defending the Revenues of the Church, London, 1646.
- Treatise maintaining the Doctrine, Liturgy, and Discipline of the Church of England, 1646.
- Short Answer to the Book of W. Prynne entitled University of Oxford's Plea refuted (1848, printed).
- De Monarchia Absoluta, 1659.
- Just Vindication of the questioned part of the reading in Middle Temple Hall, 20 Feb. 1639, London, 1660; with A Narrative of the Cause of their Silencing by the Archbishop of Canterbury (printed together apud Rushworth).
- Short Defence of the Reformation of the Church by K. Edward and Q. Elizabeth (not printed).

== Notes ==
Parliament of England
Preceded by Robert Holborne; Richard Tuffnell	Member of Parliament for Southwark; 1640–1644; With: John White	Succeeded by John White
