= Committee for Plundered Ministers =

The Committee for Plundered Ministers was originally established in late 1642 by the Presbyterian faction in the Long Parliament following the start of the English Civil War. In December 1642 the committee was formalised as a parliamentary committee charged with the purpose of supporting the puritan ministers who had been removed from their livings by royalists. Its power was restricted to conducting preliminary investigations, before being forwarded to the House of Lords, who retained the power to actually deprive a minister of their living. However, as Parliament gained the upper hand in the war, so the work of the committees became less to do with supporting clerics who supported their cause and more to do with suppressing those who supported the monarchy.

== Original composition ==
The Committee was appointed on 7 December, 1642 with the following members:

- Oliver St John, MP for Totnes, also addressed as "Mr. Sollicitor"
- Sir Gilbert Gerald, MP for Middlesex
- Sir William Armyn, MP for Grantham
- Cornelius Holland, MP for Windsor
- Francis Rous, MP for Truro
- Sir John Holland, 1st Baronet, MP for Castle Rising
- William Cage, MP for Ipswich

== Investigations ==
The Committee for Plundered Ministers met in London under the chairmanship of the Welsh lawyer, John White, Member of Parliament for Southwark.

It delegated much of its work to its sub-committees of which there was one for each county. It was initially envisaged that the committee would help ministers who were evicted from their livings by Royalists for supporting the Parliamentary cause (hence the name). However, as Parliament gained the upper hand in the war, so the work of the committees became less to do with supporting clerics who supported their cause and more to do with suppressing those who supported the monarchy.

The committee would hear evidence, often from local parishioners, of the errors in doctrine of the parish priest. If the allegations were proved, the rector was replaced and his property forcibly sequestered, so that he could only recover it by buying it back. Local parishioners sometimes used the committee's activities as an opportunity to get rid of clergy they did not like.

The committee also acted as trustee, allocating money collected from rent of rectory lands to support priests in their roles throughout Britain.

These sequestrated clergy were described as "scandalous", which meant that either they supported the Royalist cause, or their theological attitudes were high Anglican, or both. Often the two went hand in hand because, in a religious age, some of the political differences about how the country should be governed were over the laws on how church affairs should be organised and the details of how services should be conducted.

An example of the worst sort of "scandalous" behaviour (from the point of view of Parliament and its supporters) was Griffith Williams, who at the start of the Civil War was Bishop of Ossory. He remained a committed Royalist throughout the war, writing pamphlets and preaching against Parliament. During the Interregnum he lived in poverty because of the sequestration that was imposed on his property. Although during this period powerful friends found him livings, he could not take them because he would not take an oath of allegiance to Parliament. He was finally restored to his bishopric after the restoration of the monarchy in 1660.

== See also ==
- Committee for Compounding with Delinquents
- Committee for the Advance of Money
- Great Ejection after the Act of Uniformity 1662
