= William Chadwell =

English lawyer and politician

William Chadwell (born 1614) was an English lawyer and politician who sat in the House of Commons between 1640 and 1644. He supported the Royalist cause in the English Civil War.

Chadwell was the son of William Chadwell, of Broadwell, Gloucestershire. He matriculated at Exeter College, Oxford on 2 December 1631 aged 17 and was awarded BA on 7 June 1632. He was called to the bar at Lincoln's Inn in 1640.

In April 1640, Chadwell was elected Member of Parliament for Mitchell in the Short Parliament. He was re-elected MP for Mitchell for the Long Parliament in November 1640 and sat until he was disabled for supporting the King on 22 January 1644. He was awarded D.C.L. in November 1644.

Parliament of England
Parliament suspended since 1629	Member of Parliament for Mitchell; 1640–1644; With: Peter Courtney 1640; Robert Holborne 1640–1644	Succeeded by Charles Lord Kerr
