= Committee for the Advance of Money =

During the first English Civil War, the Parliamentarians used their control of the legislature to enforce a number of laws to support their military campaign, including the levying of funds. On 26 November 1642, the Committee for the Advance of Money for the Service of the Parliament was established.

The committee was established by the Long Parliament under An Ordinance for the assessing of all such as have not contributed upon the Propositions of both Houses of Parliament for the raising of money, plate, horse and horsemen, etc.

Initially it met at Haberdashers Hall under Lord Howard of Escrick. Howard was later exposed for receiving bribes from Royalists. The Committee later sat at the home of Sir William Bruncard and at the Queen's Court, Westminster.

From 1642 to 1650, the Committee investigated people's wealth and obtained forced loans for the use of Parliament but repaid the money annually with interest. Initially, funds were obtained from all parties but, from August 1646, only Royalists were forced to contribute and goods could be seized for non compliance.

Contributors included the Royalist Francis Leigh, 1st Earl of Chichester who was assessed in November 1645 at £3,000 and given a year to pay.

In 1650, the committee was merged with the Committee for Compounding with Delinquents, which had powers to seize the estates of landowners who refused to contribute to the Parliamentary cause.

== See also ==
- Committee for Compounding with Delinquents
- Committee for Plundered Ministers
