= Worcester city walls =

Defensive structures in Worcester, UK

- Worcester, Worcestershire
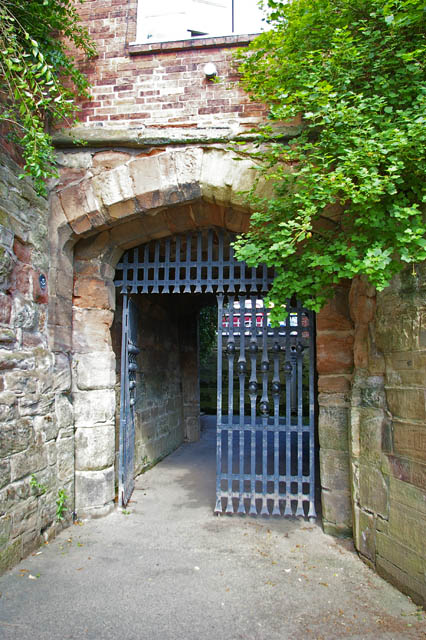
- The Water Gate

Site information
- Type: City wall

Location
- Shown within Worcestershire
- Location within Worcestershire
- Coordinates: 52.1921°N 2.2179°W
- Grid reference: grid reference SO852549

Site history
- Events: The Anarchy, First Barons' War, Second Barons' War, English Civil War

Worcester's city walls are a sequence of defensive structures built around the city of Worcester in England between the 1st and 17th centuries. The first walls to be built around Worcester were constructed by the Romans. These early walls lasted beyond the fall of the Roman Empire, and the defences encouraged several early Christian foundations to establish themselves in Worcester during the troubled 6th and 7th centuries. The Anglo-Saxons expanded Worcester in the 890s, forming a new walled, planned city, called a burh. The burh utilised the southern stretches of the old Roman walls, but pushed further north to enclose a much larger area. The Anglo-Saxon city walls were maintained by a share of taxes on a local market and streets, in an agreement reinforced by a royal charter.

After the Norman conquest of England in the 11th century a motte and bailey castle was constructed on the south side of the city, but the Norman rulers continued to use the older burh walls, despite the city having expanded beyond these defences in the north and south-east. During the years of the Anarchy in the 1140s, Worcester was successfully attacked several times; after the war a new city wall was built to improve the city's defences. The new walls, completed by the early 13th century, were constructed of stone and had three main gates. They were maintained in good condition into the 17th century.

During the English Civil War in the 1640s the old medieval walls were reinforced with modern earthwork bastions and an outlying fort, called a sconce. Worcester changed hands several times during the conflict, and after the war ended the newer fortifications were dismantled. During the 18th century the older medieval stone walls and gatehouses were sold and mostly destroyed: by the 20th century, few parts survived. Post-war archaeology in the 1950s and 1960s and construction work in the 1970s revealed previously hidden stretches of the wall, and in the 21st century plans have been drawn up to improve the conservation and maintenance of this historic monument.

== History ==
=== 1st–7th centuries ===
Comparison of Roman (red), Anglo-Saxon (green) and medieval wall (brown) circuits, against early 13th-century Worcester street plan

The first defensive walls at Worcester were built after the Roman conquest of Britain in AD 43. Although a settlement existed on the site during the Iron Age, there is no evidence that walls were ever built around it. The Roman town was probably preceded by the construction of a Roman fort, both located on the south side of the modern city and protected by the River Severn to the west. There are relatively few historical details or archaeological evidence from this period, but archaeological investigations of the Roman town walls suggest that it had wooden ramparts and was protected by an 89-foot (27 m) wide ditch. As with other Roman towns, the walls would have enclosed a rectangular town, protecting a settlement with a grid-like network of streets.

The decline of the Roman Empire brought an end to Roman rule in Britain by the start of the 5th century. The town within the old Roman walls at Worcester continued to be occupied however, remaining a prominent military feature. New Christian religious foundations were established at Worcester during this period, attracted there in large part by the security the Roman defences offered during a troubled period. In the 7th century, Worcester Cathedral was built, once again within the old Roman walls.

=== 8th–11th centuries ===
During the Anglo-Saxon period, Worcester first became the capital of the Hwicce kingdom, and later formed part of the wider kingdom of Mercia. Worcester and its defences were reorganised by Ealdorman Æthelred and Æthelflæd and bishop Werferth in the 890s. This involved creating a burh, a fortified Anglo-Saxon town; in Worcester this took the form of a planned settlement, extending out from the old Roman defences, with the Shambles forming a street running along the wall on the east. Archaeological evidence suggests that the burh had 4,650 feet (1,420 m) of walls in total; documentary evidence from the Burghal Hidage document, written shortly after the creation of the walls, suggests they were 4,960 feet (1,510 m) long, a discrepancy that may be accounted for by changes in the course of the river since the 10th century. The walls incorporated the old Roman fortifications on the south and south-east side of the city and appear to have included a defensive ditch, with a revetment supporting a wooden palisade.

The creation of the burh walls is recorded in a charter witnessed by King Alfred, which lays out the responsibilities of the various churchmen and nobles involved, and notes that the upkeep of the walls would be paid for out of a share of taxes on a new market and on the new streets. The local lords took responsibility for building the burh wall, which unusually for the period was not built on royal lands. During the 10th century, the documents on the burh suggest that the aristocratic thegns living around Worcester also owned and maintained buildings within the walls; Creighton and Higham suggest that these may have been linked to their responsibilities for defending the settlement.

During the 10th and 11th centuries Worcester spread north beyond the original burh walls, and south-east to form Sidbury. In 1041 Worcester was attacked by the royal army of Harthacnut over a tax-dispute that had led to the death of two of the king's men; despite the defensive walls, the city was successfully taken and burnt.

=== 11th–16th centuries ===
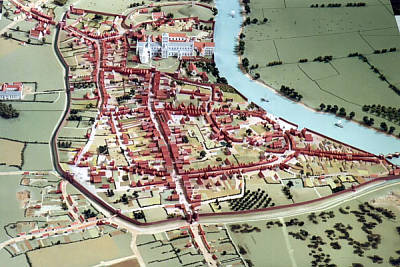
Reconstruction of Worcester and the city walls in 1250, viewed from the north (Note: The medieval reconstructions of the city walls are by Worcester City Museums, based on archaeological and historical data available in 2000.)

In 1066 William the Conqueror defeated the English army at the battle of Hastings and Norman forces advanced west into Worcestershire. To reinforce their occupation, the Normans built a motte and bailey castle on the south side of the city, taking advantage of the shape of the existing burh walls. The remaining burh walls continued to be used into the Norman period, but the city had already spread beyond them, reducing their effectiveness.

During the Anarchy (1135–1153) rival factions of King Stephen and the Empress Matilda contested the kingdom and Worcestershire proved to be a key battleground. The first attack on Worcester itself occurred in late 1139 when an Angevin army from Gloucestershire assaulted the city. After an attempt to take the castle on the south side of the city, the Gloucester forces entered from the north, looting and burning. Worcester became a base for Stephen's forces for a period, before joining the Empress's faction. In response, Stephen first stormed and burnt the city in 1148, and then attacked it again in 1150, shortly before the end of the conflict. From the accounts of these sieges, it appears that Worcester still lacked substantial walls during this period.

In the second half of the 12th century a new city wall began to be built around Worcester, with work probably continuing until early the next century. Enclosing about 85 acres (34 hectares), its design tracked the flow of natural streams to the north and east, and made use of the castle in the south as part of the defences. The walls were constructed of sandstone, and appear to have been surrounded by a flat bottomed, water-filled ditch, more than 30 feet (9.1 m) wide. The new walls cut across existing parts of the city and would have required the demolition of numerous existing buildings that lay in their way; the new defences also cut off the outlying districts of Sidbury, Lowesmoore, Foregate Street and The Tything from the inside of the walled city. Three main gates were built in the walls – North Gate, St Martin's Gate and Sidbury Gate – protected by gatehouses of paired circular towers and arrowslits for use by crossbowmen. Smaller gates were built between them, such as Friar's Gate.

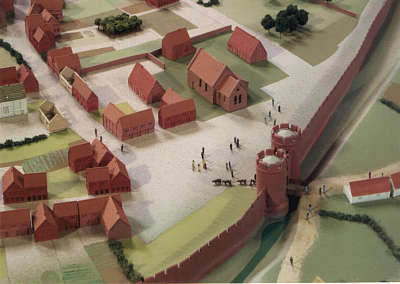
Reconstruction of St Martin's Gate in 1250, viewed from the south

Civil war broke out again in England in 1215 between forces loyal to King John and rebel barons, supported in due course by Prince Louis of France, in what has become known as the First Barons' War. Worcester sided with the rebels, and in July 1216 the city was attacked by forces under the command of Ranulf, the Earl of Chester. Ranulf attempted to storm the castle, rather than the north side of the city, and after he eventually gained access a £100 fine was imposed on the city with the threat that their walls would be destroyed if the money was not paid. (Note: It is impossible to accurately compare 13th century and modern prices or incomes. For comparison, £100 represents approximately the typical average annual income for a baron of the period.) Although Worcester's walls clearly played a military role during this period, they would also have been symbolically important to the city and have played a part in controlling civic access and enforcing the city's laws.

One method of paying for the construction and maintenance of city walls was a tax called murage, usually levied by permission of the king on particular goods being imported into a city. In Worcester, murage was raised to support work on the walls during three main phases, 1224 to 1239, 1252 to 1310 and 1364 to 1411. Worcester was attacked again during the Second Barons' War in the 1260s, and the records suggest that some of the murage payments were used to repair damage caused by that attack. In the late 14th century a watergate was built in the western walls of the city, close to a slipway for launching boats. Worcester's last murage grant occurred in 1439, although in 1459 Henry VI allowed the city to use stones from the castle to repair the walls to defend the city in anticipation of a Yorkist attack during the Wars of the Roses. As in many other English towns and cities, as the medieval period progressed, housing began to encroach on the city walls in Worcester.

=== 17th–19th centuries ===
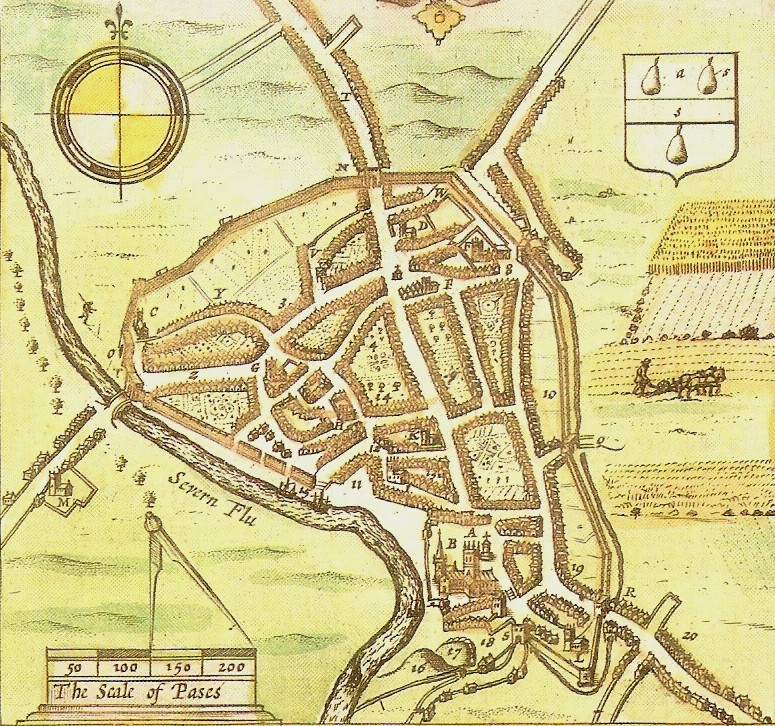
Worcester's walls seen from the south in 1610

At the start of the 17th century, Worcester's city walls were still intact, and were recorded in John Speed's famous 1610 map of the city. In 1642 the English Civil War broke out between followers of King Charles I and Parliament. At that time the walls were in a state of disrepair and only part of the wall were defended by a ditch. There were seven gates: Foregate to the north, Saint Martin's and Friar's to the east, and Sidbury was the main southern gate—Frog Gate below Worcester Castle was also on the south side. On the western side (facing the Severn) there was Priory Gate overlooking the ferry and Bridge (or Water) Gate at the end of Newport Street that guarded the Severn bridge entrance to the city. The gates themselves were still opened in the morning and closed each evening, but they were rotten and in a bad state of repair ("so much so that they would hardly shut, and if they were actually closed there was neither lock or bolt to secure them").

Worcester was occupied by Sir John Byron on 16 September 1642, who was on his way to deliver wagons of silver plate from Oxford to the Charles I at Shrewsbury. Byron realising that he could not hold Worcester with a Parliamentary army under the command of Earl of Essex already approaching city, he had sent a request to the King for additional forces to aid him. The Parliamentarians were aware of Byron's mission and an advanced force under the command of Colonel Nathaniel Fiennes arrived at the Sidbury Gate early on 22 September. What followed was typical of the inexperienced soldiery on both sides. The Parliamentarians were not challenged as they approached the gate and had they but known it they could have pushed it open and been into the town without difficulty. However, they struck the gates with an axe which made a hole in it and then fired a musket through the hole. This aroused the lax Royalist guard who called out the Royalist garrison. The Parliamentarian assault team quickly withdrew. They then loosely invested the north of the city. In doing so they hoped to prevent Byron and his convoy leaving the city, which could be taken by Essex's main force in a day or so.

Prince Rupert was sent to escort Byron and his convoy onwards from Worcester he attacked Fiennes's Parliamentary force at the Battle of Powick Bridge (23 September 1642), so allowing Byron's wagon-train to leave Worcestershire under Rupert's protection. Essex arrived in front of Worcester the next day with opposition his forces marched in. Essex and his army treated Worcester as a hostile city, officially for letting the Royalists in without a fight, but also due to their frustration at losing the convoy of silver and the Battle of Powick Bridge. Essex remained in Worcester for about a month before leaving with the bulk of his army for Warwickshire and on to the battle of Edgehill (23 October 1642). With the advance of the Royalist army from Edgehill towards London, most of Worcestershire was retaken by the Royalists, and Thomas Essex, the newly appointed Parliamentary governor, along with his garrison abandoned Worcester. Worcester was reoccupied by the Royalists in November 1642 and Sir William Russell was appointed governor. Worcester would remain in Royalist hands until 1646.

In the first few months of the First English Civil War although Worcester changed hands three times, only one musket shot was fired, so until the start of the short unsuccessful siege of May 1643 the medieval walls were not subjected to bombardment by an early modern artillery train.

The war was the first prolonged conflict in Britain to involve the use of artillery and gunpowder. Sieges became a prominent part of the war with over 300 occurring during the period. Worcester was once again a strategically important region in the war, and walled towns and cities like Worcester that could be defended against passing armies were particularly significant from a military perspective. By the 1640s the design of military fortifications had progressed significantly on the continent, owing largely to the Thirty Years War; while older medieval stone walls still had military utility, they typically needed reinforcement with more modern earthworks to be truly effective. These new ideas were applied to city defences in England. In some cases a circuit of forts was built around a city; in other cases, an entirely new city wall comprising modern bastions would be built. At Worcester, the unimproved walls were considered to be indefensible at the start of the war in 1642, and the chosen solution was to directly reinforce the existing medieval wall with new earthworks.

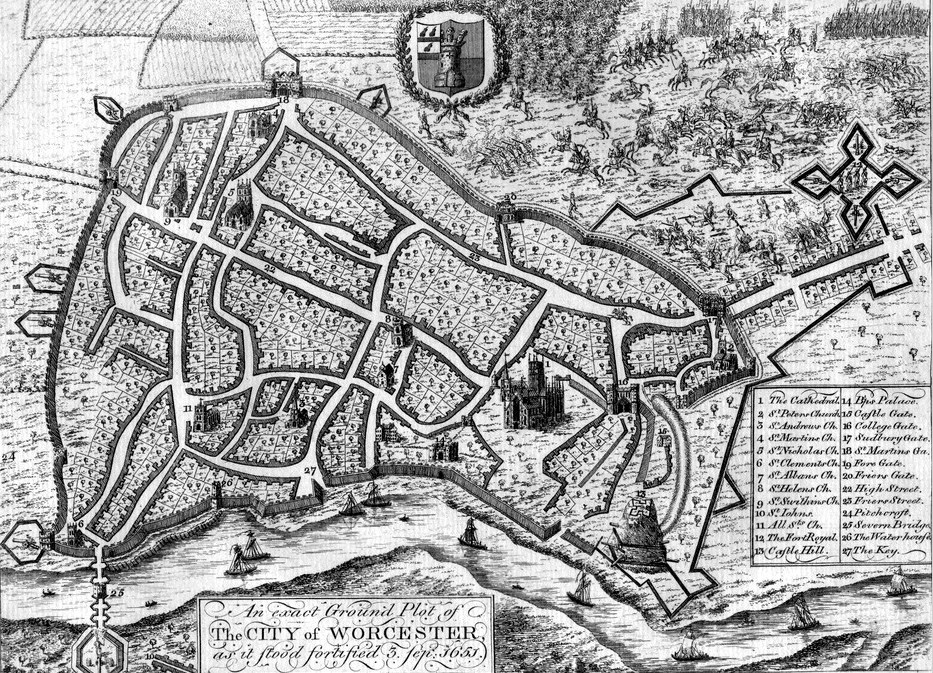
Worcester viewed from the west in 1651, showing the additional bastions built along the medieval walls

The Royalist commander Prince Maurice conscripted the adult men and women of Worcester to work on the walls, threatening the death penalty if they did not attend. To form these new defences, the buildings outside the old city walls were cleared and six large bastions were attached to them along the north and east sides of the city, while a sconce, Fort Royal Hill was built outside Sidbury Gate in the south, linked to the walls by a walkway. The ditch protecting the new earthworks was relatively shallow at about eight feet (2.4 m) deep, but when combined with the high ramparts of the bastions, which were probably protected by sharpened stakes and a banquette firing platform, the bastions would have been well defended. During the short unsuccessfully siege 1643 and the long successful siege of 1646 the reinforced defences were able to withstand the artillery bombardments – the surrender in 1646 was mainly the result of a shortage of food and the collapse of the wider Royalist position across the south-west of England.

Following further fighting between 1648 and 1649, the Third English Civil War broke out in 1651. Royalist forces under the command of Charles II advanced as far as Worcester, where the army paused to reinforce the walls further and await reinforcements in relative safety. The Parliamentary forces under Oliver Cromwell attacked in early September; the ensuing battle of Worcester saw the Royalist forces pushed steadily back into the city. Fort Royal was successfully stormed by the Essex militia and its guns turned on the city itself. Cromwell's men began forcing their way into the city from west, south and east and by the evening the city had fallen. The collapse marked the end of the Third Civil War. In the aftermath the bastions and other fortifications were mostly destroyed by Parliament, although the medieval walls and gates were spared.

By the 18th century local residents had built summer houses on top of the walls, which were still largely intact. During the next hundred years city and town walls across England began to be demolished to make way for new developments, and Worcester proved no exception. By the end of the century the walls and gates were being sold off and destroyed; Friar's Gate was probably the last to be demolished, early in the 19th century. Only a few tracts of wall survived, often concealed behind other buildings and new constructions.

== Conservation ==
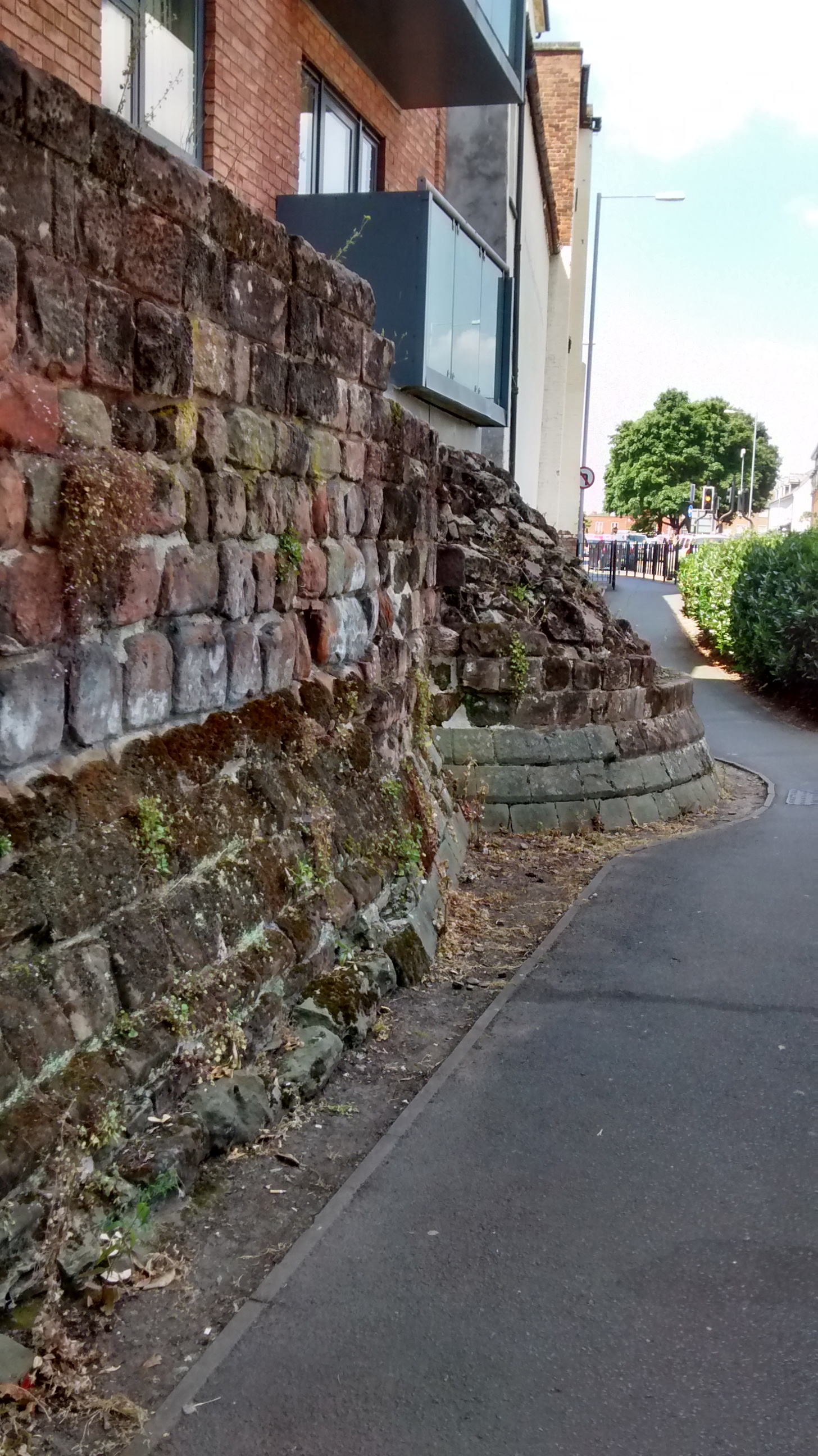
Remains of a section of a medieval wall and a tower near St Martin's Gate.

The remains of Worcester's city walls were largely ignored until after the Second World War; limited archaeological excavations first began in 1957. Work continued in the 1960s and picked up pace in the 1970s, when the creation of the City Walls Road in Worcester uncovered more parts of the wall, formerly hidden from view. The Civil War earthworks of Fort Royal Hill are still visible overlooking the city.

As a result of their mixed history, the remains of the walls are owned by various different organisations and subject to different legal protection. Some parts of the walls are protected as Grade II listed buildings and scheduled monuments, although most of the walls lack this legal recognition. The multiple ownership of the different parts of the city walls contributed to what English Heritage considered an "uncoordinated" approach to their conservation. In response, a conservation plan has been created by Worcester City Council, proposing that the walls, despite their mixed ownership, should be managed as a single historic monument, and advising that some sections be repaired urgently; as of 2010 this plan was awaiting approval by English Heritage.

== See also ==
- List of town walls in England and Wales

== Bibliography ==
- Baker, Nigel and Richard Holt. (2004) Urban Growth and the Medieval Church: Gloucester and Worcester. Aldershot, UK: Ashgate. ISBN 978-0-7546-0266-8.
- Baker, Nigel, Hal Dalwood, Richard Holt, Charles Mundy and Gary Taylor. (1992) "From Roman to medieval Worcester: development and planning in the Anglo-Saxon city," Antiquity Vol. 66, pp. 65–74.
- Barrow, Julia. (2000) "Churches, Education and Literacy in Towns, 600–1300," in Paliser (ed) (2000).
- Bradbury, Jim. (2009) Stephen and Matilda: the Civil War of 1139–53. Stroud, UK: The History Press. ISBN 978-0-7509-3793-1.
- Bradley, John and Märit Gaimster. (2004) (eds) "Medieval Britain and Ireland in 2003," Medieval Archaeology Vol. 48 pp. 229–350.
- Bull, Stephen. (2008) "The Furie of the Ordnance": Artillery in the English Civil Wars. Woodbridge UK: Boydell Press. ISBN 978-1-84383-403-8.
- Creighton, Oliver Hamilton and Robert Higham. (2005) Medieval Town Walls: an Archaeology and Social History of Urban Defence. Stroud, UK: Tempus. ISBN 978-0-7524-1445-4.
- Duffy, Christopher. (1996) Siege Warfare: The Fortress in the Early Modern World, 1494–1660. London: Routledge. ISBN 978-0-415-14649-4.
- Gaunt, Peter. (ed) (2000) The English Civil War: the Essential Readings. Oxford: Blackwell. ISBN 978-0-631-20809-9.
- Harrington, Peter. (2003) English Civil War Fortifications 1642–51. Oxford, UK: Osprey Publishing. ISBN 978-1-84176-604-1.
- Hill, David and Alexander R. Rumble. (1996) The Defence of Wessex: the Burghal Hidage and Anglo-Saxon Fortifications. Manchester: Manchester University Press. ISBN 978-0-7190-3218-9.
- Paliser, David Michael. (ed) (2000) The Cambridge Urban History of Britain. Cambridge: Cambridge University Press. ISBN 978-0-521-44461-3.
- Pounds, Norman John Greville. (1994) The Medieval Castle in England and Wales: a social and political history. Cambridge: Cambridge University Press. ISBN 978-0-521-45828-3.
- Roy, Ian. (2000) "England Turned Germany? The Aftermath of the Civil War in its European Context," in Gaunt (ed) (2000).
- Russo, Daniel G. (1998) Town Origins and Development in Early England, c.400–950 A.D. Westport, US: Greenwood. ISBN 978-0-313-30079-0.
- Wedgwood, C. V. (1970) The King's War: 1641–1647. London: Fontana. OCLC 254381447.
- Willis-Bund, John William. (1905) The Civil War in Worcestershire, 1642-1646; and the Scotch Invasion of 1651. Birmingham: The Midland Educational Company. OCLC 5771128
- Woolrych, Austin. (2004) Britain in Revolution: 1625–1660. Oxford: Oxford University Press. ISBN 978-0-19-927268-6.
- Youngs, Susan M. and John Clark, J. (1981) "Medieval Britain in 1980," Medieval Archaeology Vol. 25. pp. 166–228.
