= Battle of Powick Bridge =

1642 battle of the First English Civil War

- Part of the First English Civil War
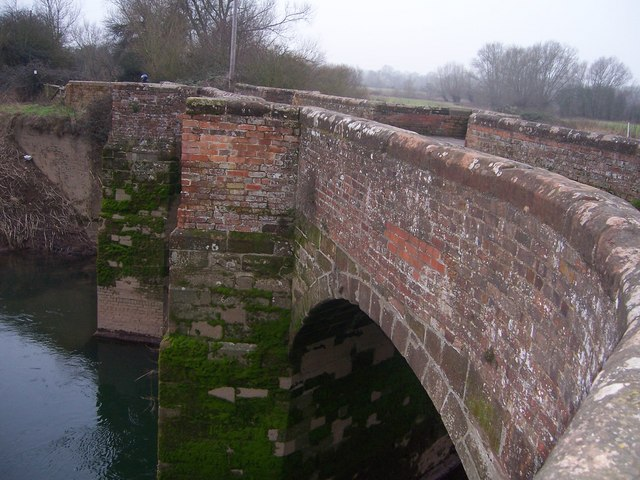
- Powick Bridge pictured in 2006
Date	23 September 1642
Location	Worcester, Worcestershire 52°10′13″N 02°14′33″W
Result	Royalist victory

Belligerents
Royalists	Parliamentarians

Commanders and leaders
Prince Rupert	Col. John Brown; Col. Edwin Sandys

Strength
1,000 horse	1,000 horse

Casualties and losses
Unknown, one estimate suggests around 30 dead	Estimated between 30 and 150 dead or captured
- Worcestershire and Worcester

The battle of Powick Bridge was a skirmish fought on 23 September 1642 (Note: Britain used the Old Style Julian calendar during the English Civil War, in which the new year started on 25 March. This article uses New Style Julian calendar dates, which assumes the year starts on 1 January.) south of Worcester, England, during the First English Civil War. It was the first engagement between elements of the principal field armies of the Royalists and Parliamentarians. Sir John Byron was escorting a Royalist convoy of valuables from Oxford to King Charles's army in Shrewsbury and, worried about the proximity of the Parliamentarians, took refuge in Worcester on 16 September to await reinforcements. The Royalists despatched a force commanded by Prince Rupert. Meanwhile, the Parliamentarians sent a detachment, under Colonel John Brown, to try to capture the convoy. Each force consisted of around 1,000 mounted troops, a mix of cavalry and dragoons.

The Parliamentarians approached the city from the south on the afternoon of 23 September. Their route took them up narrow lanes and straight into Rupert's force, which was resting in a field. The noise of the approaching Parliamentarian cavalry alerted the Royalists, who quickly formed up. The Royalist dragoons gave their cavalry time to prepare, firing at point-blank range as the Parliamentarians emerged into the field. Rupert's cavalry then charged and broke most of the Parliamentarian cavalry, although one troop stood its ground and returned fire. Ultimately, all the Parliamentarians were routed.

Brown protected his cavalry's escape by making a rearguard stand with his dragoons at Powick Bridge. Rupert gave chase as far as Powick village, but the Parliamentarian cavalry fled 15 mi (24 km) further, their flight causing panic among part of the main Parliamentarian field army. The Royalists abandoned Worcester, leaving safely with their valuable convoy. The Parliamentarian army arrived in the city the next day and remained for four weeks before shadowing the Royalist move towards London, which led to the Battle of Edgehill.

== Background ==
=== Build-up of the First English Civil War ===
In 1642 the tension between the English Parliament and King Charles, which had been building throughout his reign, escalated sharply after the King had attempted to arrest five Members of Parliament, whom he accused of treason. Having failed, Charles fled London with his family; many historians believe these events made civil war probable. In anticipation of a likely conflict, both sides began preparing for war and attempting to recruit the existing militia and new men into their armies. Parliament passed the Militia Ordinance in March 1642 without Royal assent, granting themselves control of the county militias. In response Charles granted commissions of array to his commanders, a medieval device for levying soldiers which had not been used for almost a century until the King reintroduced it during the Bishops' Wars (1639–1640).

Despite the animosity between the King and Parliament, there remained an illusion that the two sides were still governing the country together. This illusion ended when Charles moved to York in mid-March, fearing that he would be captured if he remained in the south of England. The first open conflict between the two sides occurred at Kingston-upon-Hull, where a large arsenal housed arms and equipment collected for the earlier Bishops' Wars. During the first Siege of Hull in 1642 Charles was refused entrance into the city in April and again in July by the Parliamentarian governor. Charles was successful in raising men to the Royalist cause in the north of England, the East Midlands and Wales, but without control of a significant arsenal, he lacked the means to arm them. In contrast, Parliament drew troops from the south-east of England, had plentiful arms, and controlled the navy.

On 22 August Charles raised his royal standard in Nottingham, effectively declaring war on Parliament. The two sides continued to recruit; Parliament positioned its main field army, commanded by the Earl of Essex, between the King and London, in Northampton. Charles was heavily outnumbered at this stage; he fielded between a quarter and half as many men as Essex's 20,000, and those he did have were not so well equipped. Despite this, Essex did not press his advantage: possibly because his orders allowed him to present the King with a petition to peacefully submit to Parliament, as an alternative to military action. Although there had been small-scale fighting, particularly in northern and south-western England, the two field armies did not significantly manoeuvre against each other until mid-September. On 13 September Charles moved his army west through Derby and Stafford towards Shrewsbury, where he hoped to be reinforced by the Royalist regiments being raised in Wales and the north-west and south-west of England.

=== Sir John Byron's convoy ===
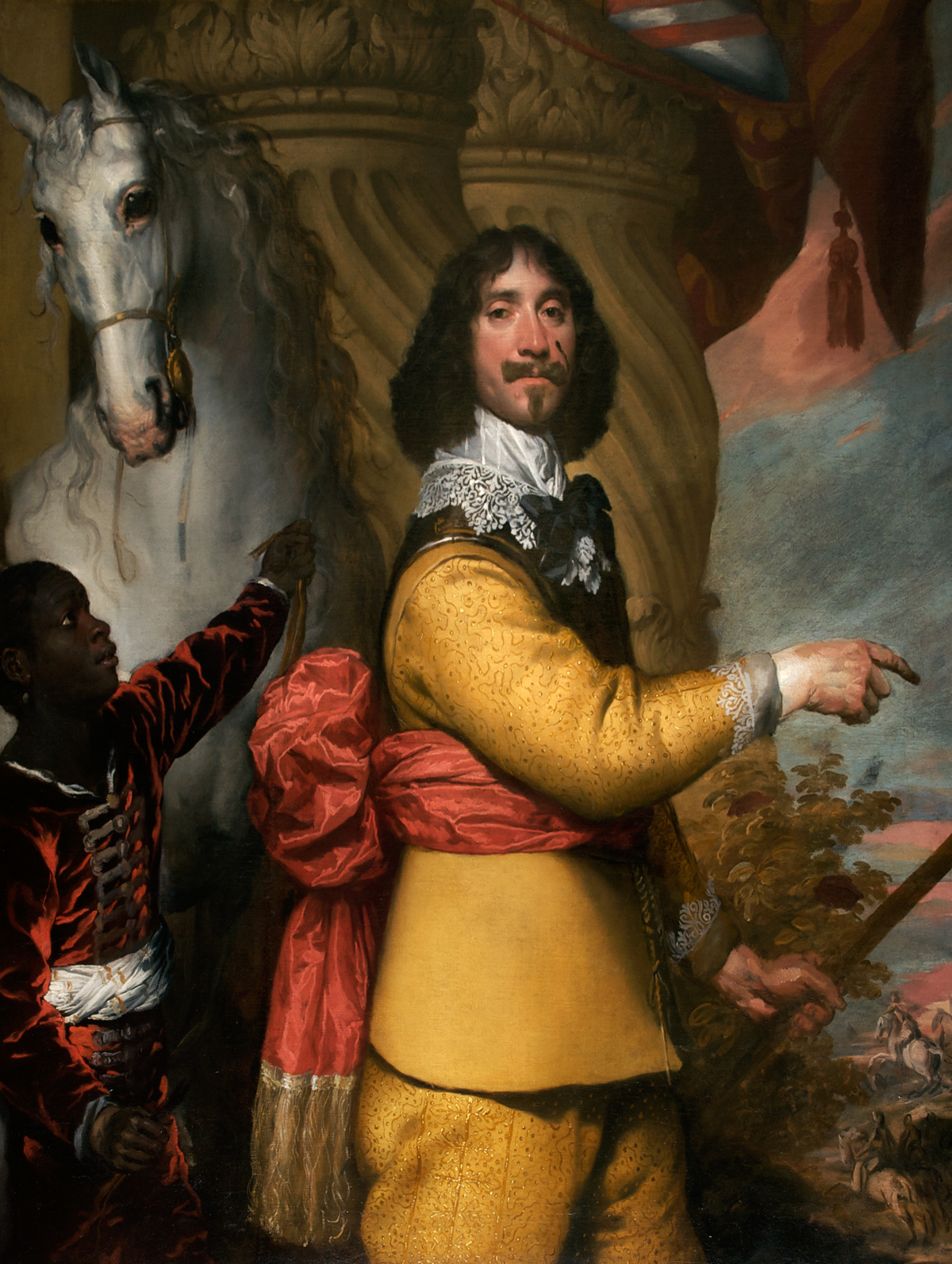
Portrait of Lord Byron by William Dobson, 1643. Sir John Byron's treasure convoy brought the opposing sides to Worcester.

Sir John Byron was a strong supporter of King Charles and raised what was probably the first Royalist cavalry regiment of the war. In August he occupied Oxford with that 160-strong regiment until it was forced to withdraw on 10 September by a larger Parliamentarian force. Byron's regiment left with a large convoy of gold and silver plate donated by Oxford University to help fund the King's war preparations. Heading towards the Royalist forces in Shrewsbury, Byron became aware of the proximity of the Parliamentarian army and chose to seek refuge. On 16 September he stopped at Worcester, a large town on the River Severn surrounded by medieval city walls in poor condition. Aware that he would not be able to hold the city, Byron awaited reinforcements.

== Prelude ==
The Parliamentarians did not react to the movement of the Royalist army until 19 September, as they sought intelligence on the King's destination, and then moved on a parallel path through Coventry and towards Worcester. This would again position Parliament's army between the Royalists and London, and Worcester was surrounded by agricultural land which could support Essex's army. While Essex was still some distance away, he received intelligence of the Royalist convoy. One of his cavalry colonels, John Brown, convinced him to send a detachment to the city to try to capture the valuables being transported.

Brown led a detachment of around 1,000 mounted troops, which reached Worcester on 22 September. They approached the eastern gate but found it well-defended. They withdrew to the south, where they secured a bridge across the Severn. One of the Parliamentarian officers present, Nathaniel Fiennes, either wrote a report or had it written for him. It stated that fellow officer Colonel Edwin Sandys argued they should move closer to Worcester to prevent the convoy from escaping. They went on to Powick, just south of the River Teme, around two miles (3 km) south of Worcester. There they spent the night and most of the following day guarding the route they expected Byron to attempt to escape along.

The Parliamentarians did not send out scouts nor post a lookout in the church tower and so were unaware that Byron had been reinforced earlier that day. Prince Rupert, the Royalist general of horse, had arrived, also with about a thousand mounted troops. Rupert's men were just north of the Teme, guarding the southern approach to the city. The modern historian Peter Gaunt suggests that Rupert was probably aware of the presence of the Parliamentarian detachment in the area, but allowed his men to rest in a field known as Wick Field (or Brickfield Meadow) and many removed their armour.

== Opposing forces ==
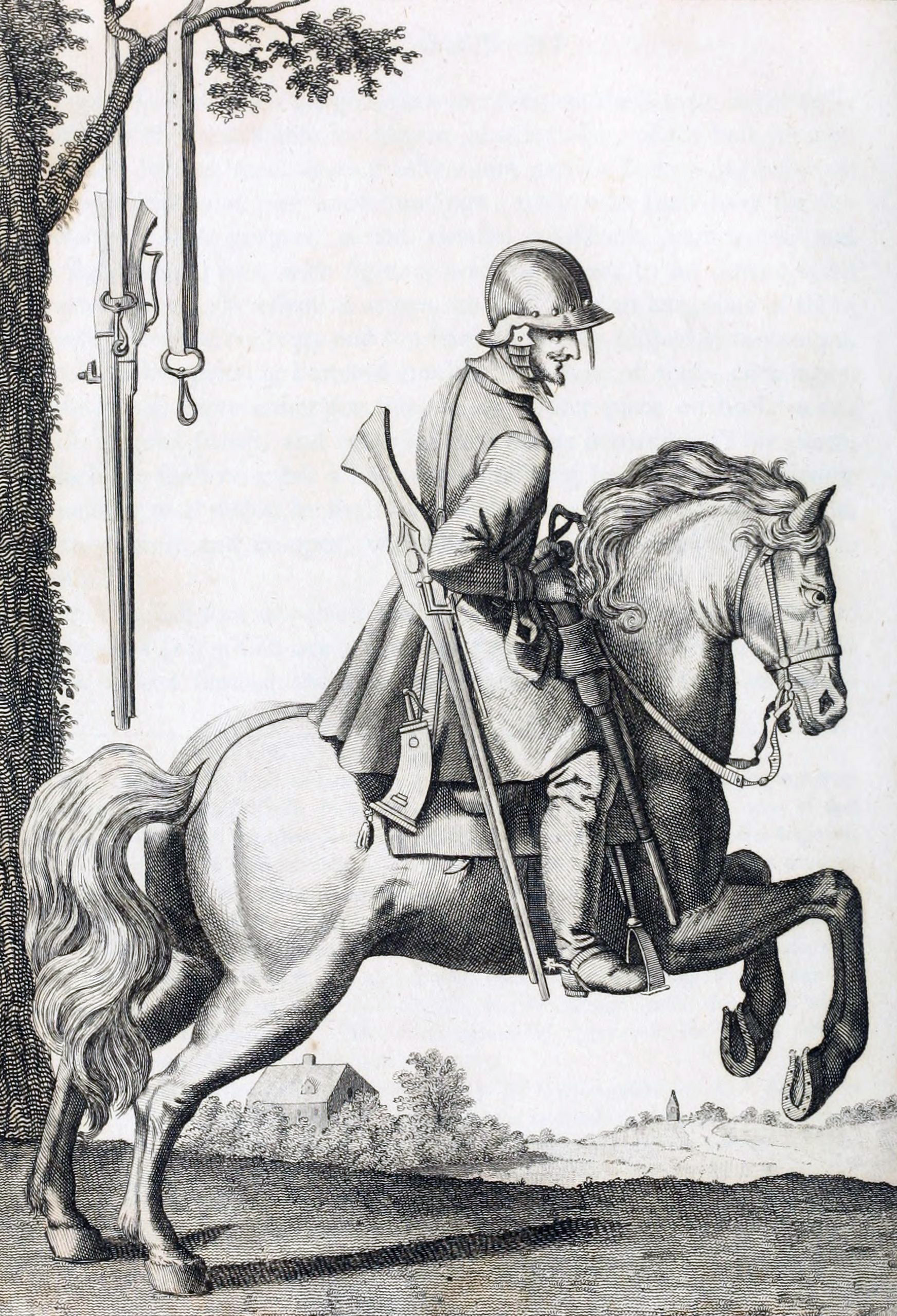
Dragoons typically rode into battle, but dismounted to fight.

Two major categories of mounted troops often referred to simply as "horse", were employed during the First English Civil War. Dragoons were mounted infantry, armed with muskets, who were typically used as skirmishers or as part of advanced guards due to their mobility. They rode into battle but dismounted to fight. The cavalry remained mounted to fight, generally on larger horses than dragoons. Most were harquebusiers, who were armoured with a helmet and plate armour on their torso and carried a sword, two pistols, and a carbine. Rupert's force was split roughly evenly between dragoons and cavalry, while the proportion of each in the Parliamentarian force is unknown: records indicate only that they had ten troops of cavalry and five companies of dragoons.

The cavalry tactics of the two forces differed. The Parliamentarians used manoeuvres originated in the army of the Dutch Republic which was the pre-eminent force in the early 17th century, and with whom many English cavalry officers had first experienced battle. In both attack and defence, Parliamentarian cavalry relied on their firepower, a tactic known as caracole. When they were on the offensive, one rank at a time moved forward to fire at their opponents, while in defence the cavalry initially remained stationary and fired into the enemy charge, hoping to break their opponents and then counter-charge. In contrast, Rupert's cavalry used a modified version of tactics used by Gustavus Adolphus of Sweden. Deploying in shallower formations than the Parliamentarians to allow a greater frontage, the Royalist cavalry attacked at the charge, (Note: Although termed a "charge", Rupert's cavalry advanced no faster than a quick trot and remained in a controlled close order formation.) using their firearms only when they were already among their opponents and often relied on their swords instead.

== Battle ==
At around 4 pm, Brown and Sandys ordered an advance towards the city. The historian Richard Brooks suggests they had received intelligence that Byron was preparing to leave Worcester. Sandys led a small group of troops ahead, across the narrow bridge and along a country lane that allowed no more than three riders abreast. Modern historians vary slightly in their account of the first stage of the engagement: Brooks, Chris Scott, and Alan Turton have the Royalist dragoons already prepared, lining the hedges of the lane. When the Parliamentarians advanced up the path, the dragoons opened fire on them, causing Sandys's men to panic and bolt forward into Wick Field; the musket-fire alerting the resting Royalist cavalry of their approach. Peter Gaunt and Trevor Royle describe all the Royalists as within the field; the noise of the Parliamentarian horsemen alerted Rupert to their approach, allowing him to quickly prepare his men for battle as best as he could. He lined the hedges with the dismounted dragoons while the cavalry was drawn up into open order in the meadow. When Sandys and his cavalry troop emerged into the field, they were faced with point-blank gunfire from the dragoons, giving the Royalist cavalry extra time to prepare.

The Parliamentarians attempted to regroup and return fire but were charged by Rupert's cavalry. Sandys was mortally wounded during the initial assault. Sandys's troops were routed with no support from their dragoons, which were stuck behind the cavalry in the narrow country lanes. Fiennes said that he managed to control his cavalry and hold fire until the charging Royalists were close enough "so that their horses' noses almost touched those of our first rank". Despite this, they were isolated after the retreat of Sandys's men and forced to abandon the fight. The Parliamentarian dragoons made a rearguard stand on Powick Bridge to protect the cavalry's retreat, but Rupert called off the chase at Powick.

== Aftermath ==
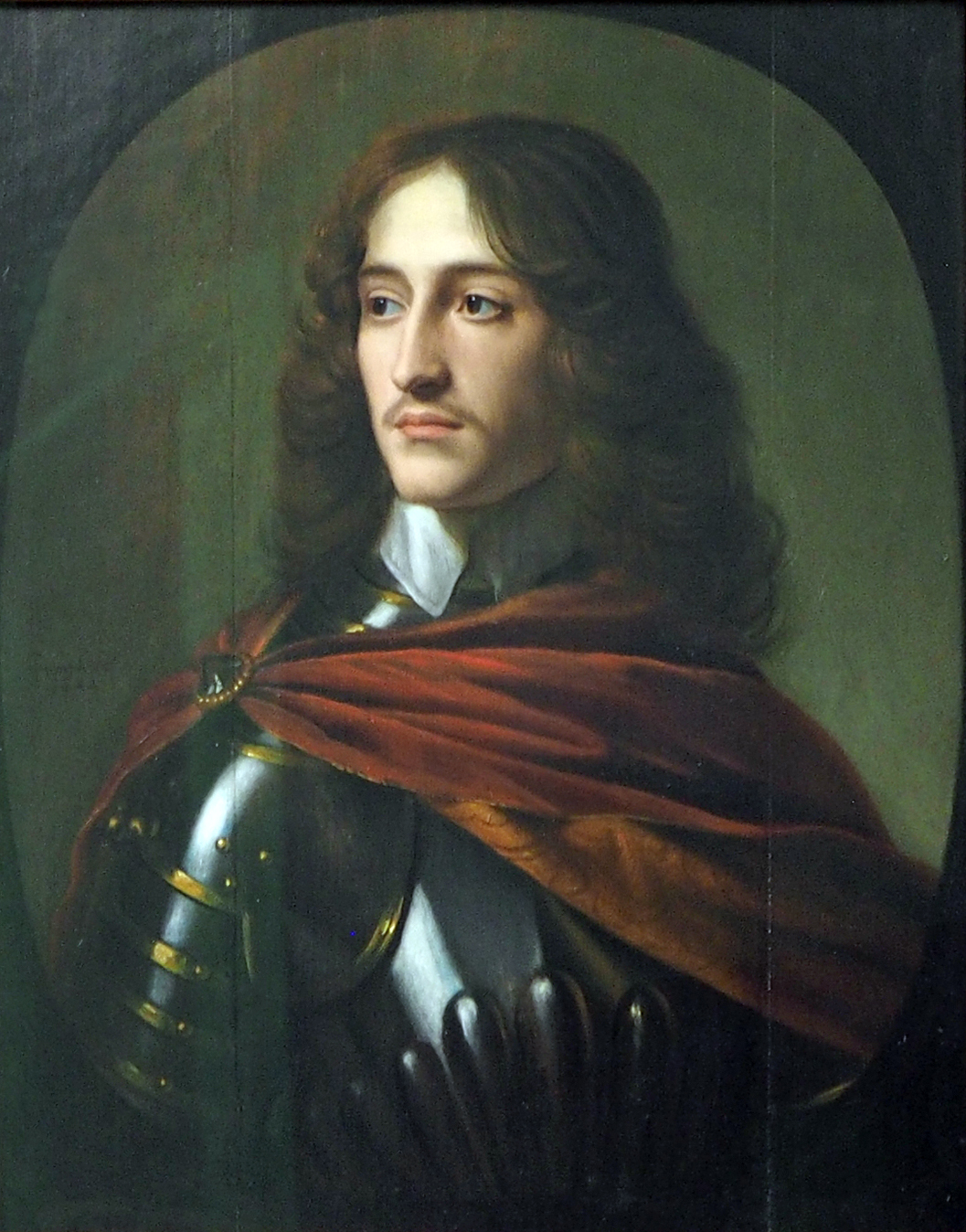
The reputation of Prince Rupert, and his Royalist cavalry, was enhanced by the battle.

The Parliamentarian cavalry rode in alarm all the way back to Pershore, 15 miles (24 km) away, where they met Essex's Lifeguard. (Note: Essex's Lifeguard was a cavalry troop commanded by Sir Philip Stapleton. They were considered the most elite cavalry troop in the Parliamentarian army, well armoured and mounted, and were responsible for guarding Essex.) Their account of the battle and belief that Rupert's cavalry was still chasing them broke the Lifeguard, which was then carried away in the flight. According to Fiennes, both sides lost around 30 men dead. Other reports place the Parliamentarian losses higher; Brooks estimates that desertions, drownings, and prisoners might have increased the total to 100–150. The Royalists claimed to have lost no one of note, though many of their officers, including Prince Maurice (Rupert's younger brother) and Henry Wilmot, were wounded.

The battle established Rupert's reputation as an effective cavalry commander; soldiers from both sides told stories of the battle, according to the Royalist commentator Edward Hyde, 1st Earl of Clarendon the victory "rendered the name of Prince Rupert very terrible". The historian Austin Woolrych describes Powick Bridge as having "significance ... disproportionate to its scale": it proved that the Royalists had forces capable of standing up to and beating those of Parliament, and affected the morale of both armies leading up to the Battle of Edgehill a month later.

No longer threatened by the Parliamentarians, the convoy was able to continue on its journey to the King and Rupert abandoned the indefensible Worcester and returned north to Shropshire. The next day, Essex's army arrived in Worcester, where they remained for the next four weeks. Although the city had declared its loyalty to Parliament on 13 September, many in Essex's army thought Worcester's citizens had helped the Royalists and that the city was accordingly treated poorly: it had to pay for transporting the wounded and burying the dead from the battle and much of the city was ransacked, particularly the cathedral.

After the further build-up of the respective armies, King Charles marched out of Shrewsbury on 12 October aiming towards London. It was considered that either defeating Essex's field army in battle or capturing London had the potential to finish the war quickly. In the event, the two armies met inconclusively at the Battle of Edgehill on 23 October, after which the Royalists were able to continue their slow approach towards London. The Parliamentarians took a less direct route to the capital but still arrived there first. After further battles at Brentford and Turnham Green, Charles withdrew to Oxford to establish winter quarters.

Almost nine years later, the final battle of the Third English Civil War, the Battle of Worcester, was also fought in and around Powick; Oliver Cromwell's Parliamentarian New Model Army secured a decisive victory over King Charles II. The day after the Battle of Worcester, the Puritan preacher Hugh Peter gave a sermon to Cromwell's troops referring to the two battles, "when their wives and children should ask them where they had been and what news, they should say they had been at Worcester, where England's sorrows began, and where they were happily ended."

== Bibliography ==
- Atkin, Malcolm (1998). Cromwell's Crowning Mercy: The Battle of Worcester 1651. Stroud: Sutton Publishing. ISBN 978-0750918886.
- Atkin, Malcolm (2004). Worcestershire Under Arms: An English County During the Civil Wars. Barnsley: Pen & Sword Military. ISBN 1844150720.
- Barratt, John (2004). Cavalier Generals: King Charles I & His Commanders in the English Civil War, 1642–46. Barnsley: Pen & Sword Military. ISBN 978-1844151288.
- Brooks, Richard (2005). Cassell's Battlefields of Britain and Ireland. London: Weidenfeld & Nicolson. ISBN 0304363332.
- Carpenter, Stanley D.M. (2007). The English Civil War. Aldershot: Ashgate. ISBN 978-0754624806.
- Gaunt, Peter (2019) [2014]. The English Civil War: A Military History. London: Bloomsbury Academic. ISBN 978-1350143517.
- Harrington, Peter (2003). English Civil War Fortifications 1642–51. Oxford: Osprey Publishing. ISBN 1841766046.
- Manganiello, Stephen C. (2004). The Concise Encyclopedia of the Revolutions and Wars of England, Scotland, and Ireland, 1639–1660. Lanham, Maryland; Toronto; Oxford: Scarecrow Press. ISBN 978-0810851009.
- Roberts, Keith; Tincey, John (2001). Edgehill 1642: The First Battle of the English Civil War. Oxford: Osprey Publishing. ISBN 1855329913.
- Royle, Trevor (2005) [2004]. Civil War: The Wars of the Three Kingdoms, 1638–1660. London: Abacus. ISBN 0349115648.
- Scott, Chris; Turton, Alan (2017). Hey For Old Robin! The Campaigns and Armies of the Earl of Essex during the First Civil War, 1642–44. Solihull: Helion & Company. ISBN 978-1911512219.
- Scott, Christopher L.; Turton, Alan; Gruber von Arni, Eric (2004). Edgehill: The Battle Reinterpreted. Barnsley: Pen & Sword Military. ISBN 1844151336.
- Tincey, John (1990). Soldiers of the English Civil War (2): Cavalry. Oxford: Osprey. ISBN 0850459400.
- Wanklyn, Malcolm (2006). Decisive Battles of the English Civil War. Barnsley: Pen & Sword Military. ISBN 978-1844154548.
- Wanklyn, Malcolm; Jones, Frank (2014) [2005]. A Military History of the English Civil War: 1642–1649. Abingdon: Routledge. ISBN 978-0582772816.
- Woolrych, Austin (2002). Britain in Revolution: 1625–1660. Oxford: Oxford University Press. ISBN 0199272689.
