= Committee for Compounding with Delinquents =

Organisation handling confiscating of Royalist estates during the English Civil War

In 1643, near the start of the English Civil War, Parliament set up two committees: the Sequestration Committee, which confiscated the estates of the Royalists who fought against Parliament, and the Committee for Compounding with Delinquents, which allowed Royalists whose estates had been sequestrated to compound for their estates – pay a fine and recover their estates – on the condition that they must pledge not to take up arms against Parliament again. The size of the fine they had to pay depended on the worth of the estate and how great their support for the Royalist cause had been.

To administer the process of sequestration, a sequestration committee was established in each county. If a local committee sequestrated an estate they usually let it to a tenant and the income was used "to the best advantage of the State". If a "delinquent" wished to recover his estate he had to apply to the Committee for Compounding with Delinquents based in London, (Note: In a paternalistic society most of the property sequestrated was owned by men.) as the national Sequestration Committee was absorbed by the Committee for Compounding in 1644.

After the Restoration of the monarchy in 1660, most of the sequestrated land was returned to the pre-war owners.

== Background ==
In 1643, the "Parliamentary Committee for the Sequestration of Delinquents' Estates" was formed to confiscate the estates of Royalists who fought against the victorious Parliamentarians in the Civil War. This was followed by the establishment of the Committee for Compounding for the Estates of Royalists and Delinquents, at Goldsmiths' Hall in the City of London, which first met on 8 November 1643.

In January 1646, the committee announced favourable terms for those who compounded prior to 1 May. This allowed those whose estates had been confiscated to regain them on payment of a fine, with the amount based on the value of their lands and level of support. Many took advantage of this.

== Assessment of sum ==
The delinquent paid a fine proportional to the value of his estate, frequently three times net annual income.

== Valuation of estate ==
The delinquent submitted to the Committee for Compounding with Delinquents a signed declaration of his revenue and assets, which ended with wording such as: This is a true particular of the estate he doth desire to compound with this Honourable Committee for, wherein he doth submit himself to the fine to be imposed (partial transcript of declaration to the Committee for Compounding with Delinquents of Francis Choke of Avington, Berkshire, dated 1646).

== Payment ==
Payment of the sum compounded was made generally at Goldsmiths' Hall in London.

== See also ==
- Committee for the Advance of Money
- Committee for Plundered Ministers
- Drury House Trustees responsible for the sale of Royalist lands.
