= The Commandery =

Historic building in Worcester, England

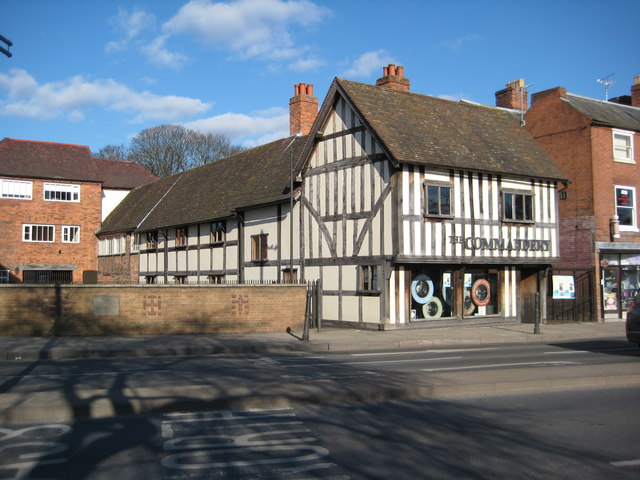
- The Commandery in March 2010
- Former names: Hospital of St. Wulfstan

General information
- Location: Worcester, Worcestershire, England
- Coordinates: 52.187903°N 2.216755°W
- Construction started: 950s (Chapel of St. Gudwal); c. 1085 (Hospital of St. Wulfstan); 1460–1470 (current building)
- Completed: c. 1470 (oldest parts of current building)
- Opened: 1977 (The Commandery Museum)
- Renovated: 1460–1470 (first renovation); c. 1540 (second renovation); 1708–c. 1794 (third renovation); 1987–2007 (fourth renovation)
- Demolished: 1540 (Hospital of St. Wulfstan); 18th century (Chapel of St. Gudwal)
- Owner: Worcester City Council

Technical details
- Structural system: Timber framing
- Floor count: 2

The Commandery is a historic building open to visitors and located in the city of Worcester, England. It opened as a museum in 1977 and was for a while the only museum in England dedicated solely to the Civil Wars. The Commandery ceased to be a Civil War museum when it reopened to the public in May 2007, having undergone a year and a half of refurbishments and reinterpretation jointly funded by the Heritage Lottery Fund and Worcester City Council, who own the Grade I listed building.

== History ==
=== 11th to 15th centuries ===
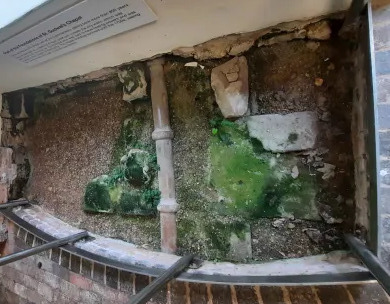
The surviving ruins of the Chapel of St. Gudwal

The first building on the Commandery site was the Hospital of St. Wulfstan, which was constructed around 1085 on the orders of Wulfstan, Bishop of Worcester (later Saint Wulfstan) as a hospital or almshouse (today a hospice) for the terminally ill, the destitute and pilgrims; it was built around the site of the Chapel of St. Gudwal, which had existed there since the 950s. The institution was then probably renamed during the early 13th century to mark the canonisation of St. Wulfstan, which occurred in 1203.

The first written record of the building is in "The Miracles of St. Wulfstan", which were compiled in 1240. This collection of stories refers to a Thomas of Eldersfield who was blinded and castrated after losing a judicial duel. According to the story, Thomas was cared for at the Hospital of St. Wulfstan by Ysabel [sic] a lay sister that took pity on him. Thomas went on to make a miraculous recovery, having both his sight and manhood restored by a miracle of St. Wulfstan. The basic facts of this story appear to be true, as the legal case definitely went before the royal justices in 1221, meaning this would suggest that the hospital was certainly in existence at that point and is nearer the suggested 12th century dating of the buildings.

The first known master of the Hospital of St Wulfstan was Walter de Wredens, and he had fought in the Crusades under the banner of either the Knights Templar or the Knights Hospitaler prior to his appointment at the hospital; Walter de Wredens was the master of the hospital until he died around 1290.

A record of the acceptance of a benefaction from one William de Molendiniis records that in 1294 there were 22 people in the infirmary, all described as "sick". By the end of the 14th century, the hospital's work appears to have altered, with several records from the 1390s showing that the hospital was granting corrodies, that is, granting people shelter and sustenance for life in return for their property (analogous to purchasing an annuity for a lump sum). Another case, from 1403, refers to Ralph and Alicia Symondes, who were granted a house and money, rather than a place in the hospital, in return for their assets. This particular example highlights that by the 15th century the Hospital of St Wulfstan had become less a charitable care home for the elderly and infirm, but rather a profitable business.

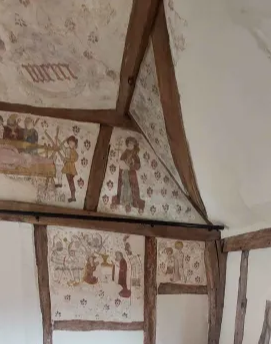
A wall of the "painted chamber" at The Commandery

By 1441, the ethics of this practice had been called into question, and Bishop Bourchier of Worcester reformed the hospital, banning the granting of corrodies. Bourchier restricted the hospital's activities to handing out a weekly dole of bread to the poor and caring for the sick inmates. He also reorganised the hospital's management structure, appointing a master, two chaplains, five brethren and two sisters. This structure remained in place until the hospital was dissolved in 1540.

The Hospital of St. Wulfstan was rebuilt around 1460 to 1470, and the current roof of the great hall dates to 1491, with the current hall range dating to the 15th century rebuild. The plan of this rebuild may have seen the building built around two courtyards, and among the rooms dating to the 15th century include a "painted chamber" showing religious figures including Catholic saints which were believed to have been made around 1475 to 1490 in what may have been a specially painted chamber for the dying where ill patients could come to pray, with the pictures showing the life to come.

=== 16th century ===
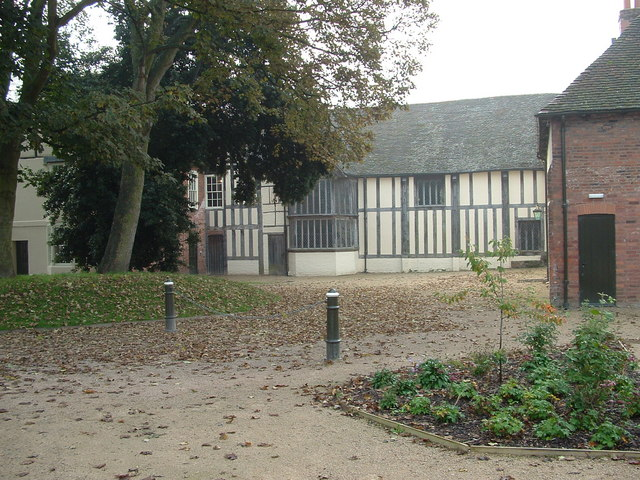
The great hall, which dates to the 1470 rebuild

The Hospital of St. Wulfstan and the Chapel of St. Gudwal were purchased by Richard Morysyne in 1539 and were then dissolved by Henry VIII in 1540 as one of the last monastic buildings to be dissolved across England; the hospital building was repurposed into a residential building, while the chapel was stripped of its valuables and left in ruin. Richard Morysyne, who was a gentleman of the Royal Privy Chamber and the last master of the hospital, seems to have been appointed specifically to wind up the affairs of the hospital. What happened after 1540 is debated. One theory suggests that Richard Morysyne profited greatly from the hospital's dissolution, being granted it for the relatively small sum of £14, while the other theory states that Morysyne surrendered the hospital, by this time known as the Commandery, to the King who then donated it to Christ Church, Oxford.

Also around this time, the wall paintings of the "painted chamber" were painted over by using whitewash, and many more objects of historic and religious value were probably lost.

In 1541, the Commandery's owner was leasing the building to Thomas Wylde, a wealthy Worcester clothier, and in 1545 Thomas bought the Commandery outright for £498. An overmantel with arched panels and Wylde heraldry was constructed around 1594, and it has since been relocated to the north-west room of the garden wing.

=== 17th and 18th centuries ===
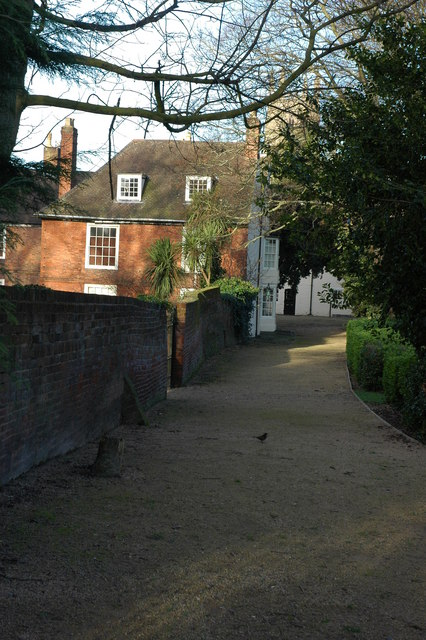
The eastern front, constructed in 1708

During the English Civil War, the Wylde family were supporters of King Charles I and later King Charles II, and by 1651, the Commandery was owned by Thomas Wylde, and the building was chosen as the headquarters for the Royalist army during the Battle of Worcester on 3 September 1651; an old mound in the grounds used previously to defend Sidbury Gate in 1646 was fortified in 1651 and is now known as Fort Royal Hill. The battle saw a Roundhead victory, with the subsequent flight of Charles II, and the death of William Hamilton at his lodgings at The Commandery on 12 September 1651 from exhaustion after he refused to have his injured leg amputated by a Roundhead surgeon.

It is believed that the last remnants of the Chapel of St. Gudwal were demolished during the 18th century, and the eastern front of The Commandery was constructed in 1708, and Thomas Wylde sold The Commandery to John Dandridge, a lawyer and land developer, in 1764. Before 1791, the Dandridge family added domestic wings on the eastern side of the building, including the prominent house at the northeastern corner of The Commandery.

In 1786, John Adams and Thomas Jefferson, US senators who later became Presidents of the United States, visited The Commandery, and they were keen to visit the English city where "the battle for the constitutional liberties of Great Britain had taken place".

=== 19th to 21st centuries ===
During the mid-19th century, The Commandery was purchased by Richard Mugg-Mence, who made several modifications including removing the fabric and original wood panelling from the great hall, alongside damaging it, and in 1843, he also demolished a three-storey 16th century house that was located to the right of The Commandery in an area that is presently located within the courtyard of The Commandery.

Between 1866 and 1887, The Commandery was leased by the Mence family and became the Worcester College for Blind Sons of Gentlemen. The first headmaster, Reverend Robert Hugh Blair, believed that blind boys should be able to have a formal education and to pursue professional careers. His successor, Reverend Samual Strong Forster, allowed blind boys from less wealthy families to have access to scholarships, and he also had plans to open a similar school for blind girls.

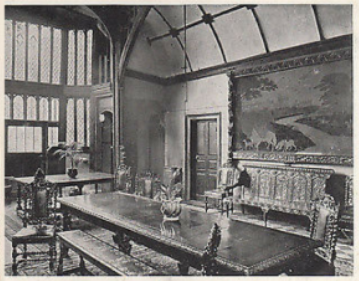
The Commandery around 1910

In 1888, The Commandery was then purchased by Joseph Littlebury, who was the final owner of the Worcester College for Blind Sons of Gentlemen. He redeveloped the building into a printworks known as Littlebury & Company, and they printed newspapers, glossy magazines, railway timetables and town guides. Littlebury had the printworks based in one wing of the building, while the Littlebury family lived in the opposite wing of the building, where in 1935, the wall paintings of the "painted chamber" were rediscovered by a decorator who informed Joseph Littlebury who had the whitewash removed, revealing the 15th century paintings.

The Commandery became Grade I listed on 5 April 1971, and Littlebury & Company continued until 4 October 1973 when the last owner decided to retire after 50 jobs at the printworks were lost due to the introduction of Value-added tax. The building was then sold to the Worcester City Council, who opened The Commandery on 13 June 1977 as a museum about the history of the building. The building then had to be restored as it was deemed to be unsafe to enter by 1985. Parts of the timber in the great hall were replaced in 1987 and restoration works to the outside of the building began in 1988.

The Commandery was excavated between 2004–06, and the site of the Chapel of St. Gudwal was identified and excavated in 2006 alongside two buried skeletons discovered two years before. The Commandery was restored again in 2006 and reopened to the public in May 2007.

== The name "Commandery" ==
According to Nash (1784) the name The "Commandery" is associated with the Knights of the Crusades. He speculates that the first known master of the Hospital of St Wulfstan, a man known only as Walter de Wredens, had fought in the Crusades under the banner of either the Knights Templar or the Knights Hospitaler prior to his appointment at the hospital. Walter apparently continued to use his military title of Commander until his death c. 1290, when his successor as master also took on the title, so starting a tradition amongst masters. By association, the residence of the Commander became known as the Commandery. No better explanation than this has been presented, although no modern research has been undertaken.
