= Fort Royal Hill =

Park in Worcester, England

- Worcester, Worcestershire, England
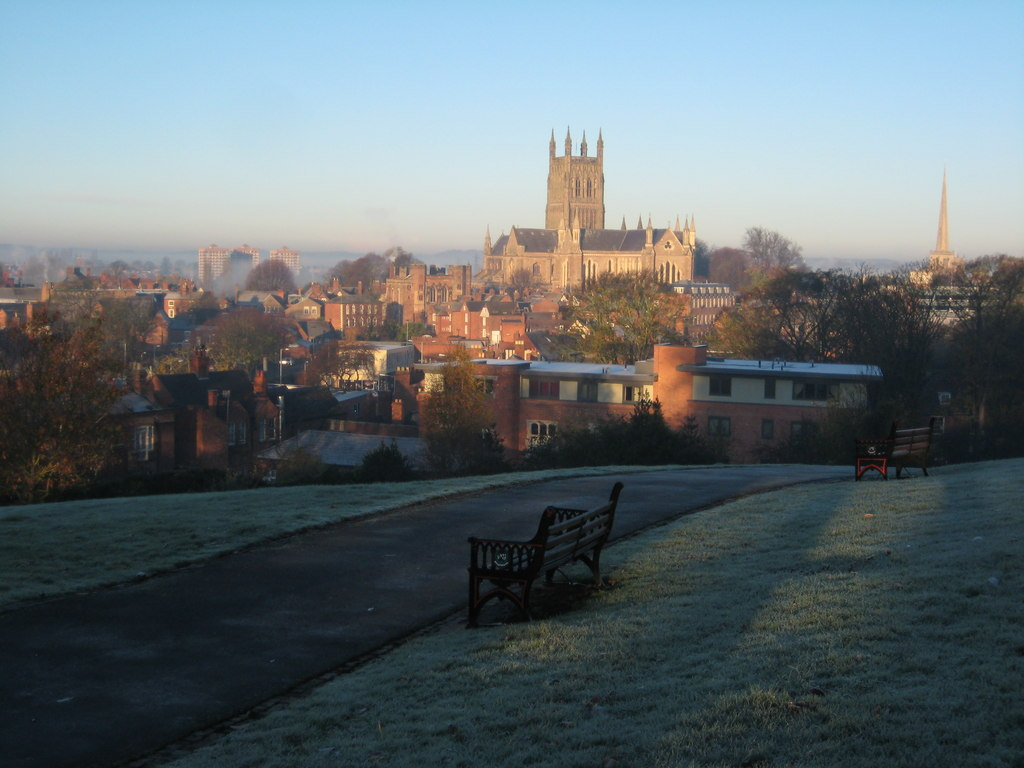
- View from Fort Royal Hill into Worcester

Site information
- Type: Redoubt
- Open to the public: Yes

Location
- Shown within Worcestershire
- Location within Worcestershire
- Coordinates: 52.1867°N 2.2223°W
- Grid reference: grid reference SO849543

Site history
- Events: English Civil War

Fort Royal Hill is a park in Worcester, England, and the site of the remains of an English Civil War fort.

== History ==
Fort Royal was a Civil War sconce (or redoubt) on a small hill to the south-east of Worcester overlooking the Sidbury Gate. It was built by the Royalists in 1651 to defend the hill, because during the siege in 1646 Parliamentary forces had positioned their artillery on the hill and had been able to severely damage the city's walls.

During the final stages of the Battle of Worcester, fought on 3 September 1651, the last battle of the war and a Parliamentary victory, the Royalists' retreat turned into a rout in which Parliamentarian and Royalist forces intermingled and skirmished up to and into the city. The Royalist position became untenable when the Essex militia stormed and captured Fort Royal, turning the Royalist guns to fire on Worcester.

In early April 1786, John Adams and Thomas Jefferson visited Fort Royal Hill at the battlefield at Worcester. Adams wrote

Edgehill and Worcester were curious and interesting to us, as scenes where freemen had fought for their rights. The people in the neighborhood appeared so ignorant and careless at Worcester, that I was provoked, and asked, "And do Englishmen so soon forget the ground where liberty was fought for? Tell your neighbors and your children that this is holy ground; much holier than that on which your churches stand. All England should come in pilgrimage to this hill once a year." This animated them, and they seemed much pleased with it. Perhaps their awkwardness before might arise from their uncertainty of our sentiments concerning the civil wars.

— John Adams.

== Commemoration ==
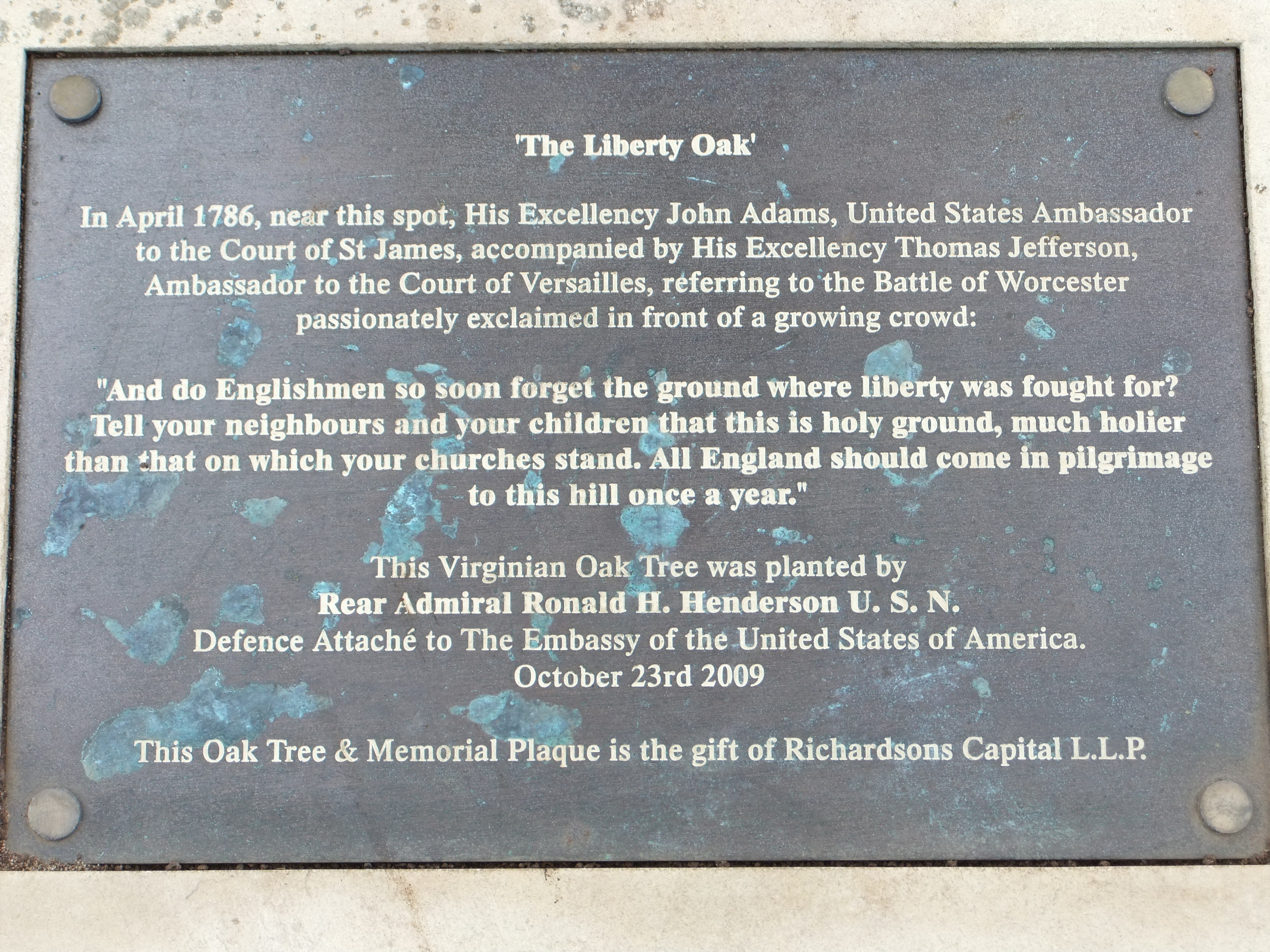
The plaque at the foot of the Virginian oak tree

On 23 October 2009 a Virginian oak tree was planted in Fort Royal Park by Rear Admiral Ronald H. Henderson, Defence Attaché to the Embassy of the United States, to commemorate this occasion.
