= List of MPs not excluded from the English parliament in 1648 =

This is a list of members of Parliament (MPs) in the Rump Parliament which was the final stage of the Long Parliament which began in the reign of King Charles I and continued into the Commonwealth.

In December 1648 the army imposed its will on parliament and large numbers of MPs were excluded under Pride's Purge, creating the Rump Parliament. This left many constituencies without representatives. Many MPs who were not officially excluded did not participate in the affairs of the house. Although the parliament was dissolved in 1653 and four intervening parliaments were called, the Long Parliament was reconvened in 1659 for another dissolution.

This list contains details of the MPs in the house after 1648. For the original membership of the House of Commons in 1640 see List of MPs elected to the English parliament in 1640 (November). For the membership immediately preceding Pride's Purge, see List of MPs in the English parliament in 1645 and after

== List of constituencies and MPs ==
Oliver Cromwell (Cambridge)

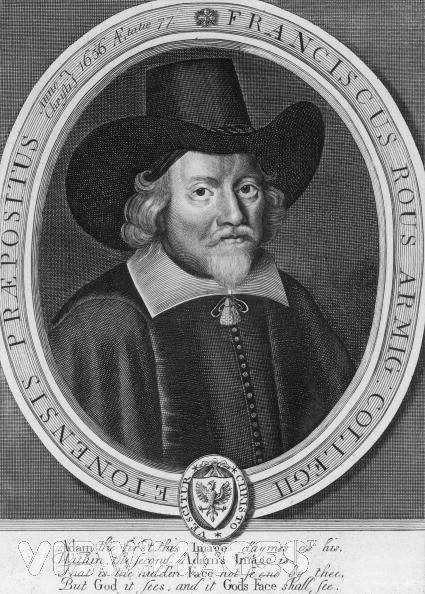
Francis Rous (Truro)

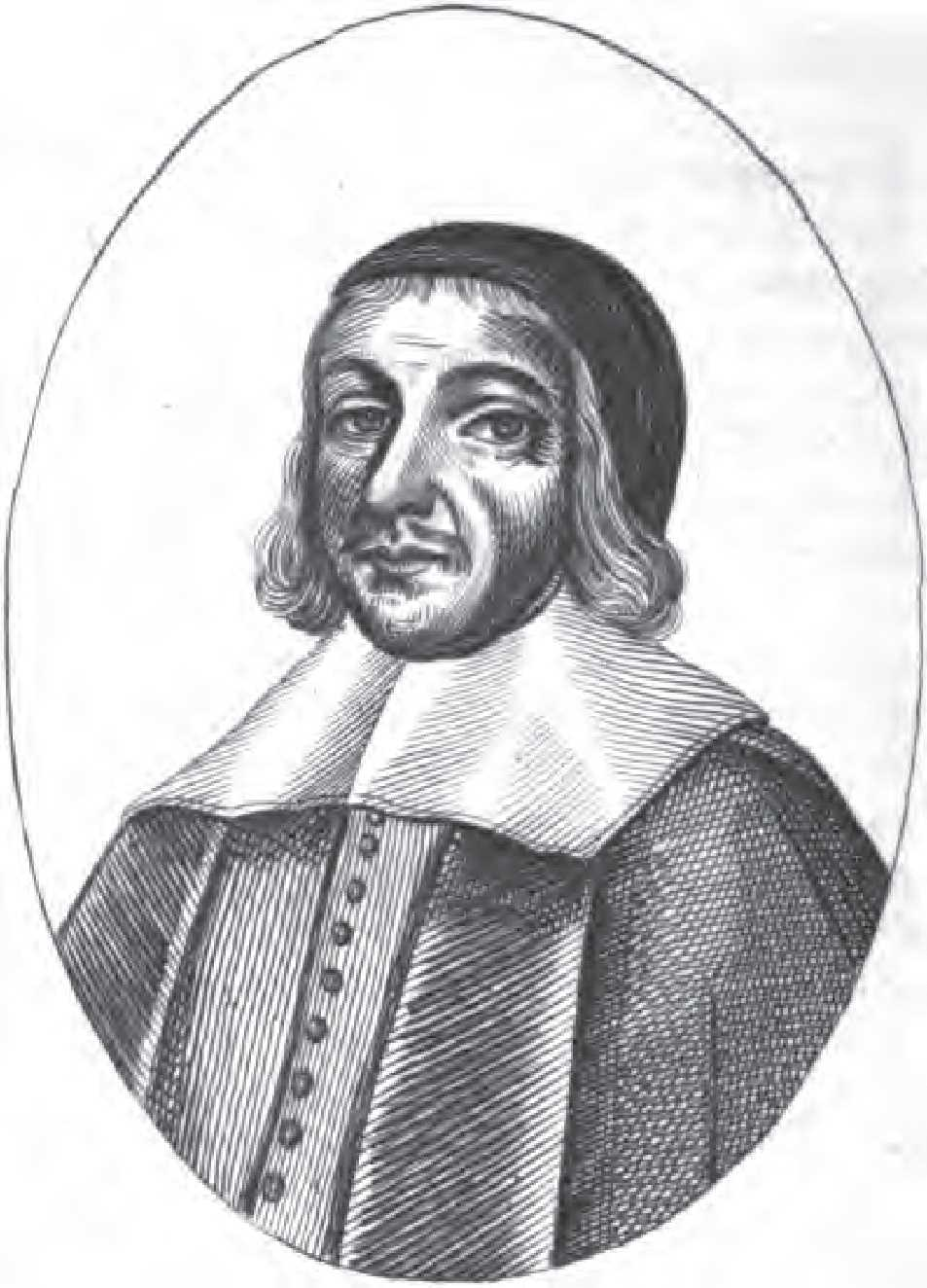
Miles Corbett (Yarmouth)

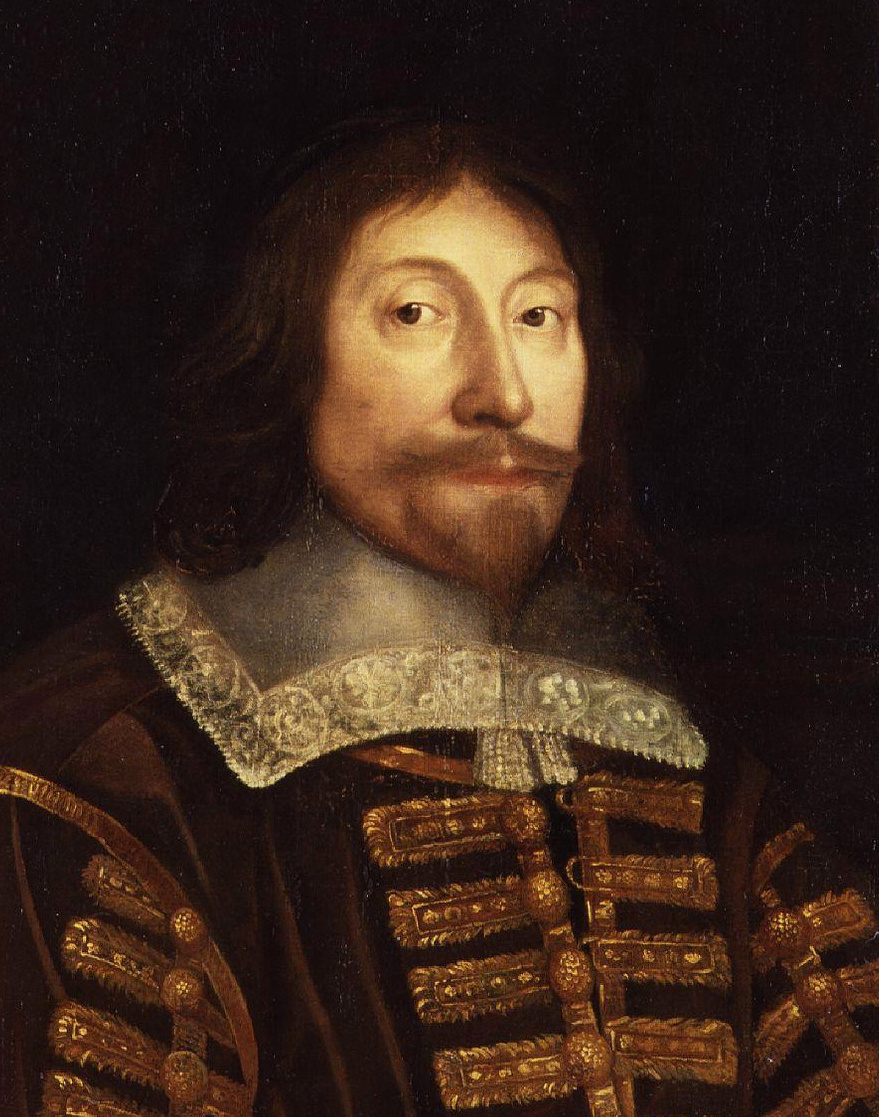
William Lenthall (Speaker)

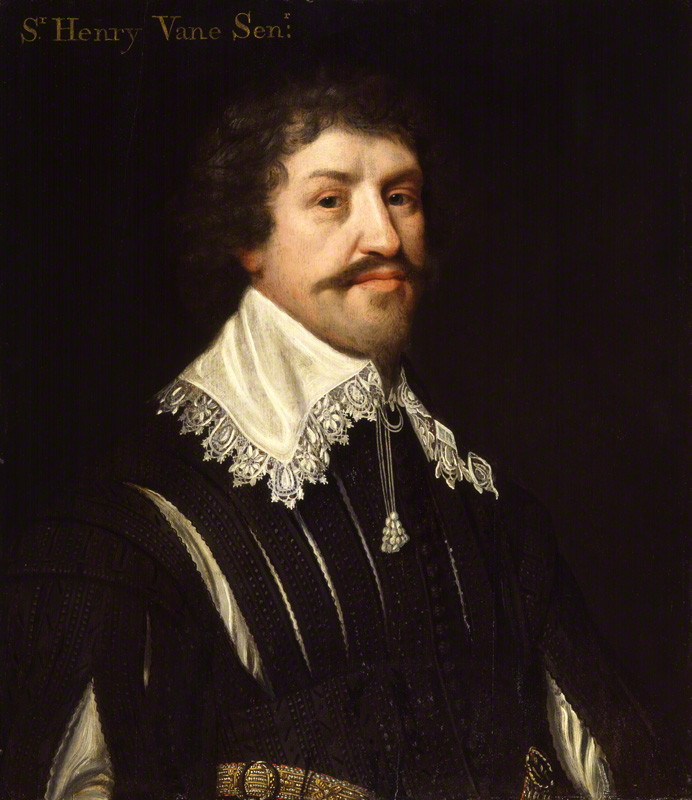
Sir Henry Vane (Wilton}

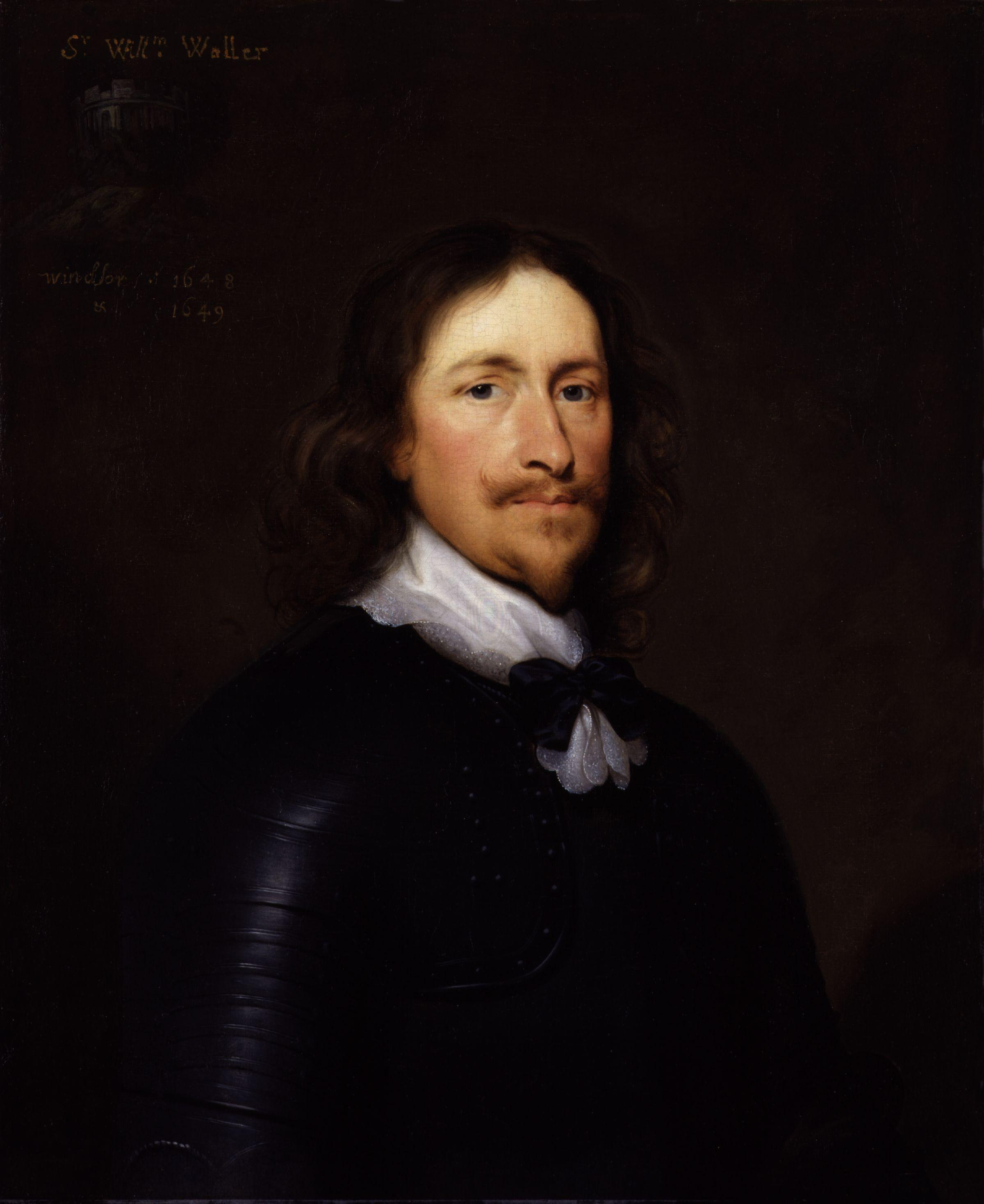
William Waller (Andover)

William Cawley (Midhurst)

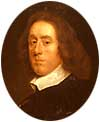
Henry Vane (Hull)

=== Bedfordshire ===
Constituency	Members	Notes
Bedfordshire	Sir Roger Burgoyne, 2nd Baronet	Some sources exclude Burgoyne
Bedford	Sir Beauchamp St John; Richard Edwards	Edwards elected November 1650
=== Berkshire ===
Constituency	Members	Notes
Berkshire	Philip Herbert, 4th Earl of Pembroke; Henry Marten	Pembroke died - replaced by Henry Neville; Marten regicide
Windsor	Cornelius Holland	Holland regicide
Reading	Tanfield Vachel; Daniel Blagrave	
Abingdon	Henry Neville	Elected Apr 1649
Wallingford	Edmund Dunch	
=== Buckinghamshire ===
Constituency	Members	Notes
Buckinghamshire	George Fleetwood; Edmund West	Fleetwood regicide
Buckingham	Sir Peter Temple; John Dormer	
Wycombe	Major General Richard Browne	Browne disabled 4 December 1649
Aylesbury	Thomas Scot; Simon Mayne	Scot and Mayne regicides
Amersham	Sir William Drake, 1st Baronet	Some sources give Drake excluded
Wendover	Richard Ingoldsby; Thomas Harrison	Ingoldsby regicide
Marlow	Bulstrode Whitelocke	
=== Cambridgeshire ===
Constituency	Members	Notes
Cambridgeshire	Francis Russell	
Cambridge University	Henry Lucas; Nathaniel Bacon	
Cambridge	Oliver Cromwell; Lieutenant-General, John Lowry	Cromwell regicide
=== Cheshire ===
Constituency	Members	Notes
Cheshire	Sir William Brereton; George Booth	
City of Chester	John Ratcliffe	
=== Cornwall ===
Constituency	Members	Notes
Cornwall	Hugh Boscawen; Nicholas Trefusis	Some sources give Trefusis excluded Boscawen not recorded as sitting
Launceston		
Liskeard	George Kekewich	Some sources give Kekewich excluded
Lostwithiel	John Maynard	Maynard not recorded as sitting
Truro	Francis Rous	
Bodmin	Anthony Nichols	Nichols not recorded as sitting
Helston	John Penrose	Penrose not recorded as sitting
Saltash	Henry Wills	Some sources give Wills excluded
Camelford	William Say; Gregory Clement	Both regicides; Clement disabled 11 May 1652
Grampound	Sir John Trevor	
Eastlow	John Moyle	
Westlow	John Arundell	
Penryn	Sir John Bampfylde, 1st Baronet	
Tregoney	John Carew	Regicide
Bossiney	Sir Christopher Yelverton	Not recorded as sitting
St Ives	John Feilder; Henry Rainsford	
Fowey	John Upton	
St Germans	Benjamin Valentine	Died 1652
Mitchel	Charles Lord Rochester	
Newport		
St Mawes	Richard Erisey	
Callington	Thomas Dacres; Lord Clinton	Some sources give Dacres excluded
=== Cumberland ===
Constituency	Members	Notes
Cumberland	William Armine; Richard Tolson	Some sources give Tolson excluded
Carlisle	Thomas Cholmley; Edward Howard, 1st Baron Howard of Escrick	Cholmley not recorded as sitting
Cockermouth	Sir John Hippisley; Francis Allen	Allen regicide
=== Derbyshire ===
Constituency	Members	Notes
Derbyshire	Sir John Coke	
Derby	Nathaniel Hallowes	
=== Devon ===
Constituency	Members	Notes
Devon	William Morice	Some sources give Morice excluded
Exeter	Samuel Clark	
Totnes	Oliver St John; John Maynard	
Plymouth	Sir John Yonge, 1st Baronet	Some sources give Yonge excluded
Barnstaple	Philip Skippon; John Dodderidge	
Plympton Erle	Christopher Martyn; Sir Richard Strode	
Tavistock	Edmund Fowell; Elisha Crimes	Some sources give both excluded
Clifton Dartmouth Hardness	Thomas Boone	
Bere Alston	Francis Drake	
Tiverton	John Elford; Robert Shapcote	Some sources give Shapcote excluded and Elford Not recorded as sitting
Ashburton	Sir Edmund Fowell; Sir John Northcote Bt	Some sources give both excluded
Honiton	Walter Yonge	Yonge not recorded as sitting
Okehampton	Lawrence Whitaker	
=== Dorset ===
Constituency	Members	Notes
Dorset	John Browne; Sir Thomas Trenchard	Trenchard not recorded as sitting
Poole	John Pyne	
Dorchester	Denis Bond	
Lyme Regis	Edmund Prideaux; Richard Rose	Rose not recorded as sitting
Weymouth		
Melcombe	William Sydenham; John Bond	Some sources give both excluded
Bridport	Roger Hill; Thomas Ceeley	Some sources give Ceeley excluded
Shaftesbury	John Fry; John Bingham	Fry expelled for heterodoxy 24 February 1650
Wareham	John Trenchard	
Corfe Castle	Francis Chettel	Not recorded as sitting
=== Essex ===
Constituency	Members	Notes
Essex	Sir William Masham Bt	
Colchester	John Sayer	Not recorded as sitting
Maldon	Sir Henry Mildmay	Regicide
Harwich	Sir Thomas Cheek	
=== Gloucestershire ===
Constituency	Members	Notes
Gloucestershire	Nathaniel Stephens	
Gloucester	Thomas Pury; John Lenthall	
Cirencester	Sir Thomas Fairfax; Nathaniel Rich	Fairfax not recorded as sitting
Tewkesbury	John Stephens	
=== Hampshire ===
Constituency	Members	Notes
Hampshire	Richard Whitehead; Richard Norton	
Winchester	John Lisle; Nicholas Love	
Southampton	George Gallop; Edward Exton	
Portsmouth	Richard Cromwell	
Yarmouth	Viscount L'Isle; Sir John Leigh	Some sources give Leigh excluded
Petersfield		
Newport al. Medina	Sir Henry Worsley, 2nd Baronet; William Stephens LLD	Some sources give Worsley excluded
Stockbridge	William Hevingham; William Jephson	Hevingham regicide; Jephson not recorded as sitting
Newtown	Sir John Barrington; John Bulkeley	
Christchurch	John Kempe; Richard Edwards	Kempe not recorded as sitting
Whitchurch	Sir Thomas Jervoise; Thomas Hussey	
Lymington	John Button; Henry Campion	Some sources give Gutton excluded; Campion not recorded as sitting
Andover	Robert Wallop	Wallop regicide
=== Herefordshire ===
Constituency	Members	Notes
Herefordshire		
Hereford	Edmund Weaver; Bennet Hoskyns	Some sources give Hoskyns excluded
Weobley	Robert Andrews; William Crowther	
Leominster		
=== Hertfordshire ===
Constituency	Members	Notes
Hertfordshire		
St Albans		
Hertford	Viscount Cranborne; William Leman	Cranborne not recorded as sitting
=== Huntingdonshire ===
Constituency	Members	Notes
Huntingdonshire	Valentine Walton; Edward Montagu, 1st Earl of Sandwich	
Huntingdon	Abraham Burrell	
=== Kent (see also Cinque Ports) ===
Constituency	Members	Notes
Kent	Augustine Skinner; John Boys	Some sources give Boys excluded
Canterbury	Sir Edward Masters; John Nutt	
Rochester	Richard Lee; Sir Thomas Walsingham	Some sources give Lee excluded
Maidstone	Thomas Twisden	Some sources give Twisden excluded
Queensborough	Sir Michael Livesey; Augustine Garland	Livesey and Garland regicides
=== Lancashire ===
Constituency	Members	Notes
Lancashire	Ralph Assheton; Sir Richard Hoghton, 3rd Baronet	
Lancaster	Sir Robert Bindlosse; Thomas Fell	Some sources give Bindlosse excluded
Preston	William Langton	Not recorded as sitting
Newton	William Ashurst	
Wigan	Alexander Rigby	Rigby died 1650
Clitheroe	Richard Shuttleworth	Some sources give Shuttleworth excluded
Liverpool	John Moore; Thomas Birch	Moore regicide died 1650
=== Leicestershire ===
Constituency	Members	Notes
Leicestershire	Sir Arthur Hesilrige; Henry Smith	Henry Smith regicide
Leicester	Lord Grey of Groby; Peter Temple	Grey and Temple regicide
=== Lincolnshire ===
Constituency	Members	Notes
Lincolnshire	Sir John Wray, 2nd Baronet	Some sources give Wray excluded
Lincoln	Thomas Grantham; Thomas Lister	
Boston		
Grimsby	William Wray; Edward Rossiter	
Stamford	Thomas Hatcher; John Weaver	Some sources give Hatcher excluded
Grantham	Sir William Airmine	
=== Middlesex ===
Constituency	Members	Notes
Middlesex	Sir Edward Spencer	Not recorded as sitting
Westminster	John Glynne; William Bell	Some sources give both excluded
City of London	Isaac Penington; John Venn	Venn died 1650
=== Monmouthshire ===
Constituency	Members	Notes
Monmouthshire	John Herbert; Henry Herbert	
Monmouth	Thomas Pury jun.	
=== Norfolk ===
Constituency	Members	Notes
Norfolk		
Norwich	Thomas Atkins; Erasmus Erle	
King's Lynn	William Cecil, 2nd Earl of Salisbury; Thomas Toll	
Yarmouth	Miles Corbet; Edward Owner	Corbet Regicide; Owner not recorded
Thetford	Sir Thomas Wodehouse	
Castle Rising	Sir John Holland, 1st Baronet	Some sources give Holland excluded
=== Northamptonshire ===
Constituency	Members	Notes
Northamptonshire	Sir Gilbert Pickering, Bt; John Dryden Bt.	Pickering regicide
Peterborough		
Northampton	Zouch Tate	Not recorded as sitting
Brackley		
Higham Ferrars	Edward Harby	
=== Northumberland ===
Constituency	Members	Notes
Northumberland	William Fenwick	Some sources give Fenwick excluded
Newcastle	John Blakiston; Robert Ellison	
Berwick upon Tweed	Sir Thomas Widdrington; Robert Scawen	
Morpeth	John Fiennes; George Fenwick	
=== Nottinghamshire ===
Constituency	Members	Notes
Nottinghamshire	John Hutchinson; Gervase Pigot	Hutchinson regicide
Nottingham	Gilbert Millington; Francis Pierrepoint	Millington regicide
East Retford	Edward Nevill	
=== Oxfordshire ===
Constituency	Members	Notes
Oxfordshire	James Fiennes	Some sources give Fiennes excluded
Oxford University	John Selden	
Oxford	John Doyley; John Nixon	Some sources give both excluded
Woodstock	William Lenthall	Speaker
Banbury		
=== Rutland ===
Constituency	Members	Notes
Rutland	Thomas Waite; James Harrington	
=== Salop ===
Constituency	Members	Notes
Shropshire	Humphrey Edwards	Edwards regicide
Shrewsbury	Thomas Hunt; William Masham	
Bridgnorth	Robert Clive; Robert Charlton	Some sources give both excluded
Ludlow	Thomas Mackworth; Thomas Moor	
Wenlock	William Pierrepont; Sir Humphrey Bridges	
Bishops Castle	Isaiah Thomas; John Corbet	Corbet attended only one day
=== Somerset ===
Constituency	Members	Notes
Somerset	John Harrington	Not recorded as sitting
Bristol	Richard Aldworth; Luke Hodges	
Bath	James Ashe; Alexander Popham	
Wells	Lislebone Long	
Taunton	Robert Blake; George Searle	
Bridgwater	Sir Thomas Wroth; John Palmer	
Minehead	Edward Popham; Walter Strickland	Popham not recorded as sitting
Ilchester	William Strode; Thomas Hodges	Some sources give both excluded
Milborne Port	William Carent	
=== Staffordshire ===
Constituency	Members	Notes
Staffordshire	John Bowyer; Thomas Crompton	Some sources give Bowyer excluded
Stafford		
Newcastle under Lyme	Sir John Merrick	
Lichfield	Michael Noble	Noble died 1649
Tamworth	George Abbot; Sir Peter Wentworth	
=== Suffolk ===
Constituency	Members	Notes
Suffolk	Sir Nathaniel Barnardiston	Not recorded as sitting
Ipswich	John Gurdon; Francis Bacon	Some sources (e.g. HoP website) say Bacon excluded but readmitted 1649
Dunwich	Gen. Robert Brewster	
Orford	Sir Charles Legross	
Aldeburgh	Squire Bence; Alexander Bence	Some sources give Alexander Bence excluded
Sudbury	Brampton Gurdon	
Eye		
Bury St Edmunds	Sir Thomas Barnardiston	
=== Surrey ===
Constituency	Members	Notes
Surrey		
Southwark	George Thomson; George Snelling	
Bletchingly	John Evelyn, senior Edward Bysshe	Some sources give both excluded
Reigate	William Lord Viscount Monson; George Evelyn	
Guildford		
Gatton		
Haslemere	John Goodwin; Carew Raleigh	
=== Sussex ===
Constituency	Members	Notes
Sussex	Anthony Stapley	
Chichester		
Horsham	Hall Ravenscroft	
Midhurst	William Cawley; Sir Gregory Norton Bt.	Cawley regicide
Lewes	Herbert Morley; Henry Shelley	
New Shoreham	Herbert Springet	Some sources give Springet excluded
Bramber	James Temple	Regicide
Steyning	Edward Apsley	
East Grinstead	Robert Goodwin; John Baker	
Arundel	John Downes	Regicide
=== Warwickshire ===
Constituency	Members	Notes
Warwickshire		
Coventry	John Barker	Barker originally excluded but reinstated in 1649
Warwick	William Purefoy; Godfrey Bosvile	Purefoy regicide
=== Westmorland ===
Constituency	Members	Notes
Westmoreland	James Bellingham; Henry Lawrence	Some sources give Lawrence excluded; Bellingham not recorded as sitting
Appleby	Richard Salway; Henry Ireton	Ireton regicide, died November 1651.
=== Wiltshire ===
Constituency	Members	Notes
Wiltshire	Edmund Ludlow	Regicide
Salisbury	Michael Oldisworth; John Dove	
Wilton	Sir Henry Vane (the elder)	
Downton	Alexander Thistlewaite	Some sources give Thistlethwaite excluded
Hindon	Robert Reynolds; Edmund Ludlow	
Heytesbury	Thomas Moore; Edward Ashe	Some sources give Moore excluded
Westbury	John Ashe	
Calne	Hugh Rogers; Rowland Wilson	Wilson died 19 February 1650
Devizes	Sir Edward Bayntun; Robert Nicholas	
Chippenham	William Eyre of Neston; Sir Edward Bayntun	
Malmesbury	Sir John Danvers	Regicide
Cricklade		
Great Bedwyn	Edmund Harvey	Harvey regicide
Ludgershall		
Old Sarum	Hon. Robert Cecil; Sir Richard Lucy	Cecil not recorded as sitting
Wootton Bassett		
Marlborough	Charles Fleetwood; Philip Smith	
=== Worcestershire ===
Constituency	Members	Notes
Worcestershire	John Wilde; Humphrey Salwey	
Worcester	John Coucher	Coucher was 88 in 1648 and if not excluded did not attend
Droitwich	George Wylde II; Edmund Wylde	
Evesham	Richard Cresheld	Cresheld not recorded as sitting
Bewdley	Nicholas Lechmere	
=== Yorkshire ===
Constituency	Members	Notes
Yorkshire		
York	Sir William Allanson; Thomas Hoyle (Alderman)	Hoyle died 1650
Kingston upon Hull	Sir Henry Vane, junior Peregrine Pelham	Pelham regicide died 1650
Knaresborough	Sir William Constable, Bt. Thomas Stockdale	Constable regicide
Scarborough	John Anlaby; Luke Robinson	
Ripon	Sir Charles Egerton; Sir John Bourchier	Bourchier Regicide; Some sources give Egerton excluded
Richmond	Thomas Chaloner; Francis Thorpe	Chaloner regicide
Hedon	Sir William Strickland; John Alured	Alured regicide died 1651
Boroughbridge	Sir Thomas Maulaverer Bt; Henry Stapylton	Mauleverer Regicide; Some sources give Stalylton excluded
Thirsk	Thomas Lascelles; William Ayscough	Some sources give Ayscough excluded
Aldborough	Brian Stapylton; James Chaloner	Stapylton not recorded as sitting
Beverley	James Nelthorpe	
Pontefract	Henry Arthington; William White	
Malton	Henry Darley; John Wastell	
Northallerton	Richard Darley	
=== Cinque Ports ===
Hastings	Roger Gratwick	
Romney		
Hythe	Henry Heyman; Thomas Westrow	
Dover	John Dixwell; Benjamin Weston	Dixwell regicide
Sandwich		
Seaford		
Rye	William Hay; John Fagg	
Winchelsea	Samuel Gott	Some sources give Gott excluded
=== Wales ===
Constituency	Members	Notes
Anglesey		
Newburgh		
Brecknockshire	Philip Jones	
Brecknock	Ludovic Lewis	
Cardiganshire	Sir Richard Pryse, 1st Baronet	
Cardigan	Thomas Wogan	
Carmarthenshire		
Carmarthen		
Carnarvonshire		
Carnarvon		
Denbighshire		
Denbigh		
Flintshire	John Trevor	
Flint		
Glamorgan	Philip, Lord Herbert	Herbert succeeded to peerage in 1649
Cardiff	Algernon Sidney	
Merioneth	John Jones	
Montgomeryshire		
Montgomery	George Devereux	
Pembrokeshire		
Pembroke	Sir Hugh Owen, 1st Baronet	
Haverford West		
Radnorshire	Arthur Annesley	Some sources give Annesley excluded
Radnor		

== See also ==
- Rump Parliament
- List of MPs nominated to the English parliament in 1653
