= List of MPs elected to the English parliament in November 1640 =

This is a list of members of Parliament (MPs) elected in 1640 to the Long Parliament which began in the reign of King Charles I and continued into the Commonwealth.

The fifth and last Parliament of Charles I began at Westminster 3 November 1640 and continued sitting till 20 April 1653, when it was dissolved. There were five additional constituencies which were Ashburton, Honiton and Okehampton in Devon, and Malton and Northallerton in Yorkshire.

The length of the parliament and the turbulent times of the civil war resulted in a considerable turnover of MPs. At election, several MPs were elected for more than one seat, which resulted in re-elections and possible disputes. Some electoral disputes were never resolved within the term of the parliament. In the first year groups of MPs were lost - some were created peers as Charles I wished to strengthen his House of Lords; others were expelled as monopolists or for subversion. As the country plunged into Civil War, the Westminster parliament was divided, with over 150 MPs throwing in their lot with the King, and meeting at Oxford. These were nearly all disabled as a result. Several MPs on both sides were killed in action, adding to the normal roll call of deaths through natural causes. By around 1645 replacements were being elected to replace the disabled members.

In December 1648 the army imposed its will on parliament and large numbers of MPs were excluded under Pride's Purge, creating the Rump Parliament. Many who were not officially excluded did not participate in the affairs of the house. Although the parliament was dissolved in 1653 and four intervening parliaments were called, the Long Parliament was reconvened in 1659 for another dissolution.

This list contains details of the MPs elected in 1640 and shortly afterwards. For the second half of the parliament after around 1645 when a new set of MPs were drafted in, see List of MPs in the English parliament in 1645 and after. There is also a list of MPs not excluded from the English parliament in 1648

== List of constituencies and MPs ==
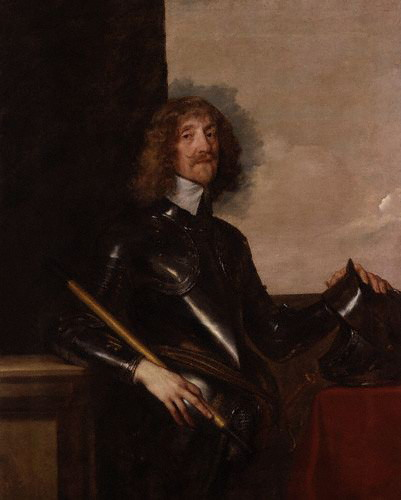
Sir Edmund Verney (Wycombe)

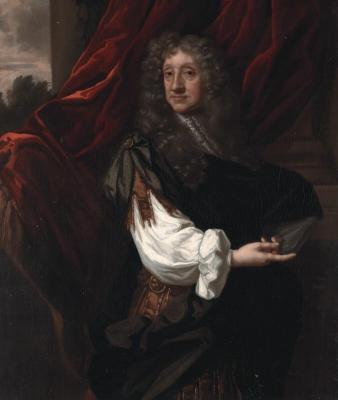
Sir Ralph Verney, 1st Bt by Sir Peter Lely (Aylesbury)

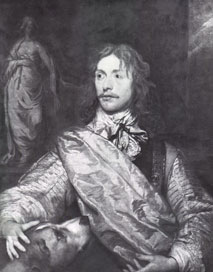
Sir Thomas Chicheley (Cambridgeshire)

Major General Sir William Brereton (Cheshire)

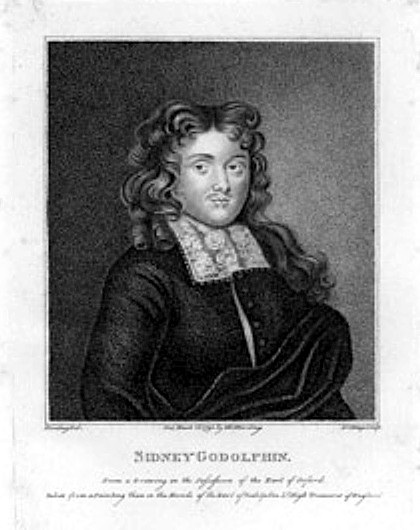
Sidney Godolphin (Helston)

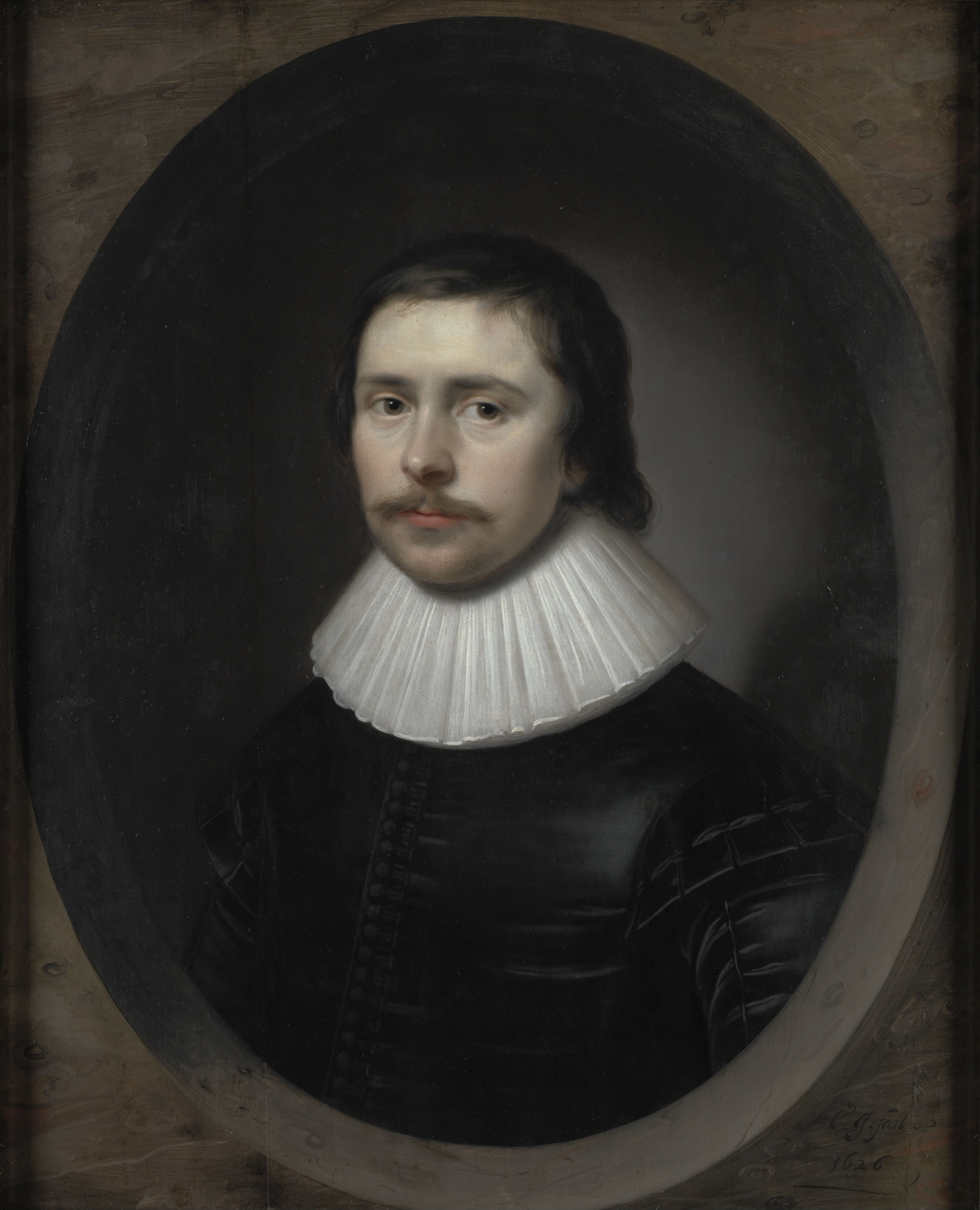
Edward Hyde (Saltash)

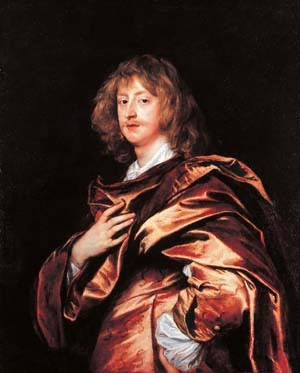
George Digby, 2nd Earl of Bristol (Dorset)

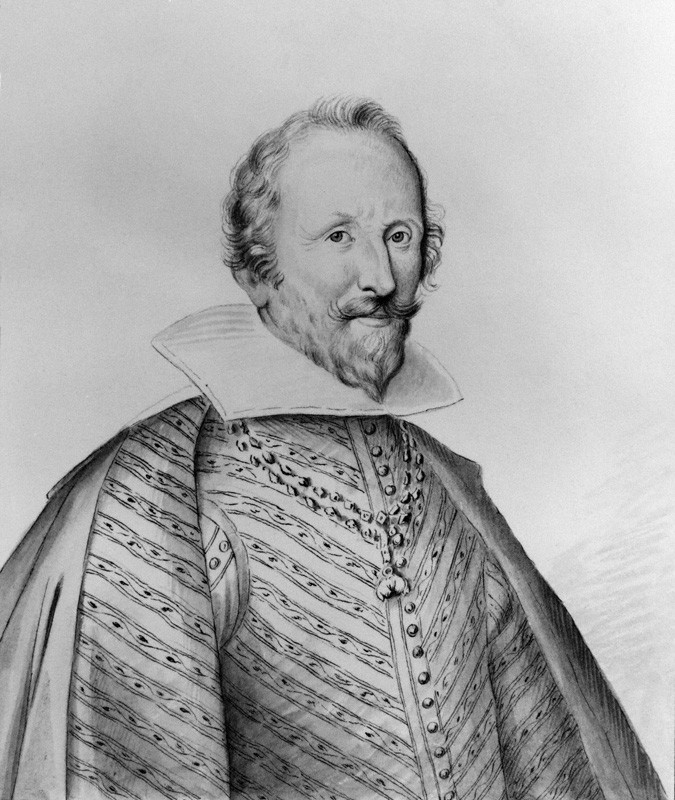
Lord Colepeper (Kent)

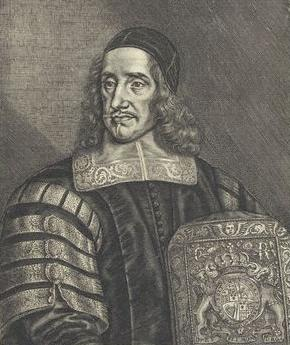
Sir Orlando Bridgeman (Wigan)

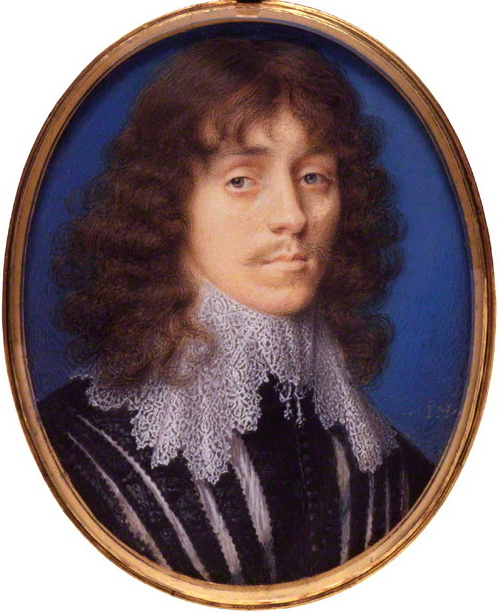
Lucius Carey, Viscount Falkland (Newport IOW)

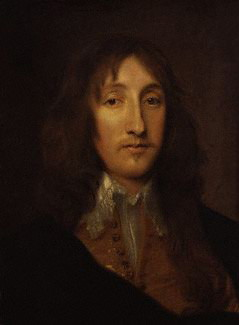
Viscount Dungarvon (Appleby)

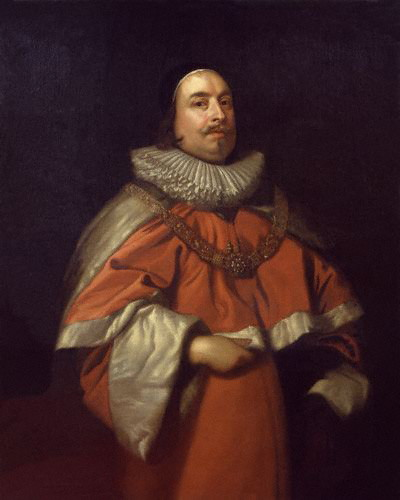
Sir Edward Littleton, 1st Baronet (Staffordshire)

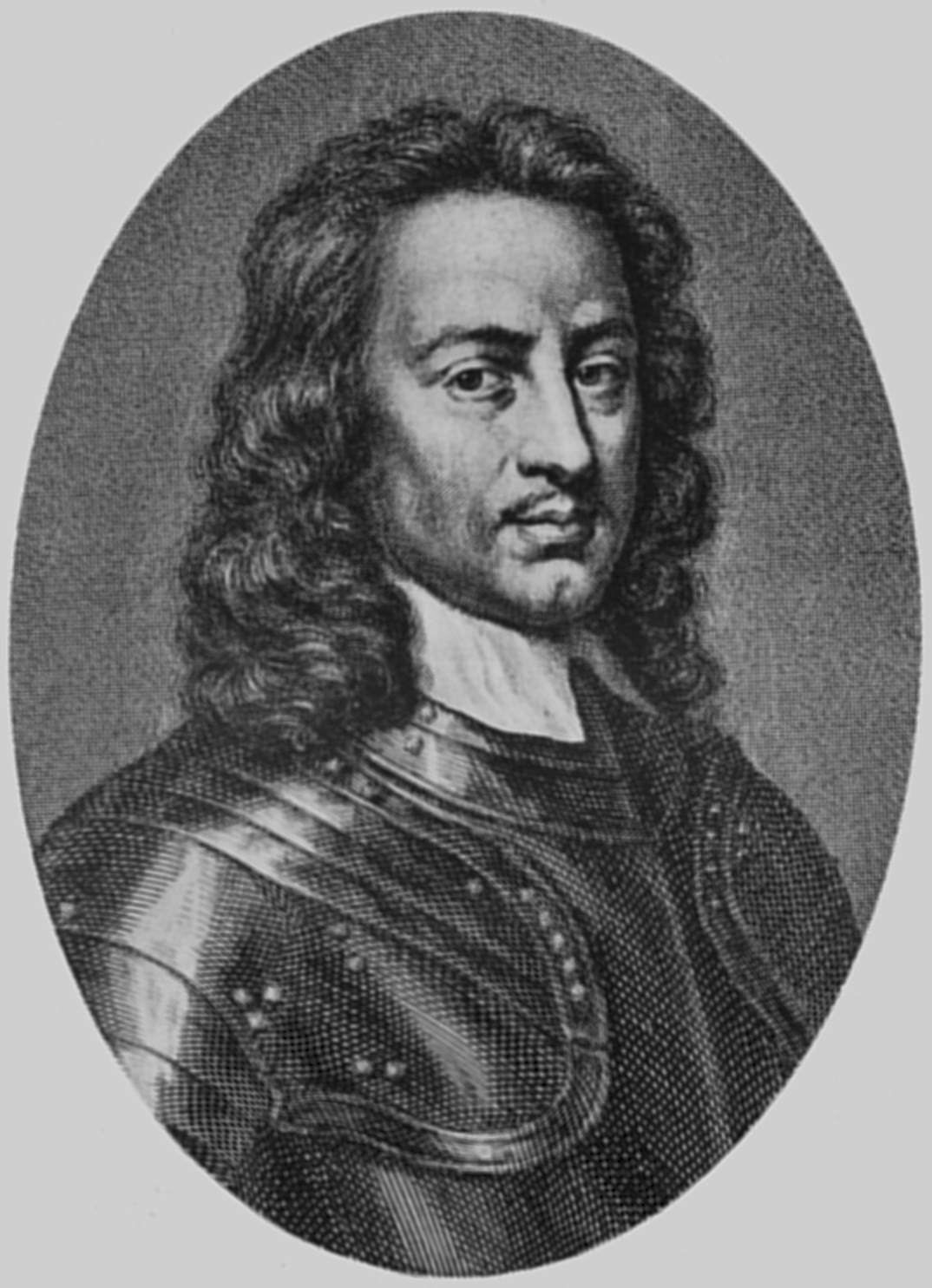
John Hampden (Buckinghamshire)

Oliver Cromwell (Cambridge)

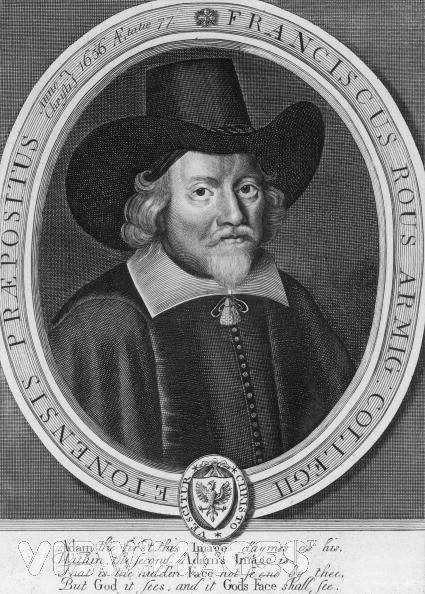
Francis Rous (Truro)

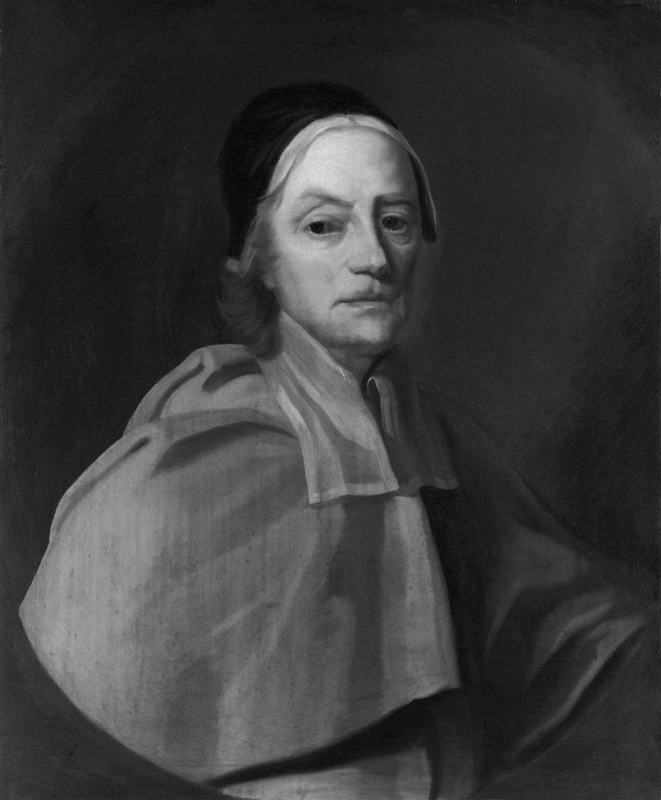
Sir John Maynard (Totnes)

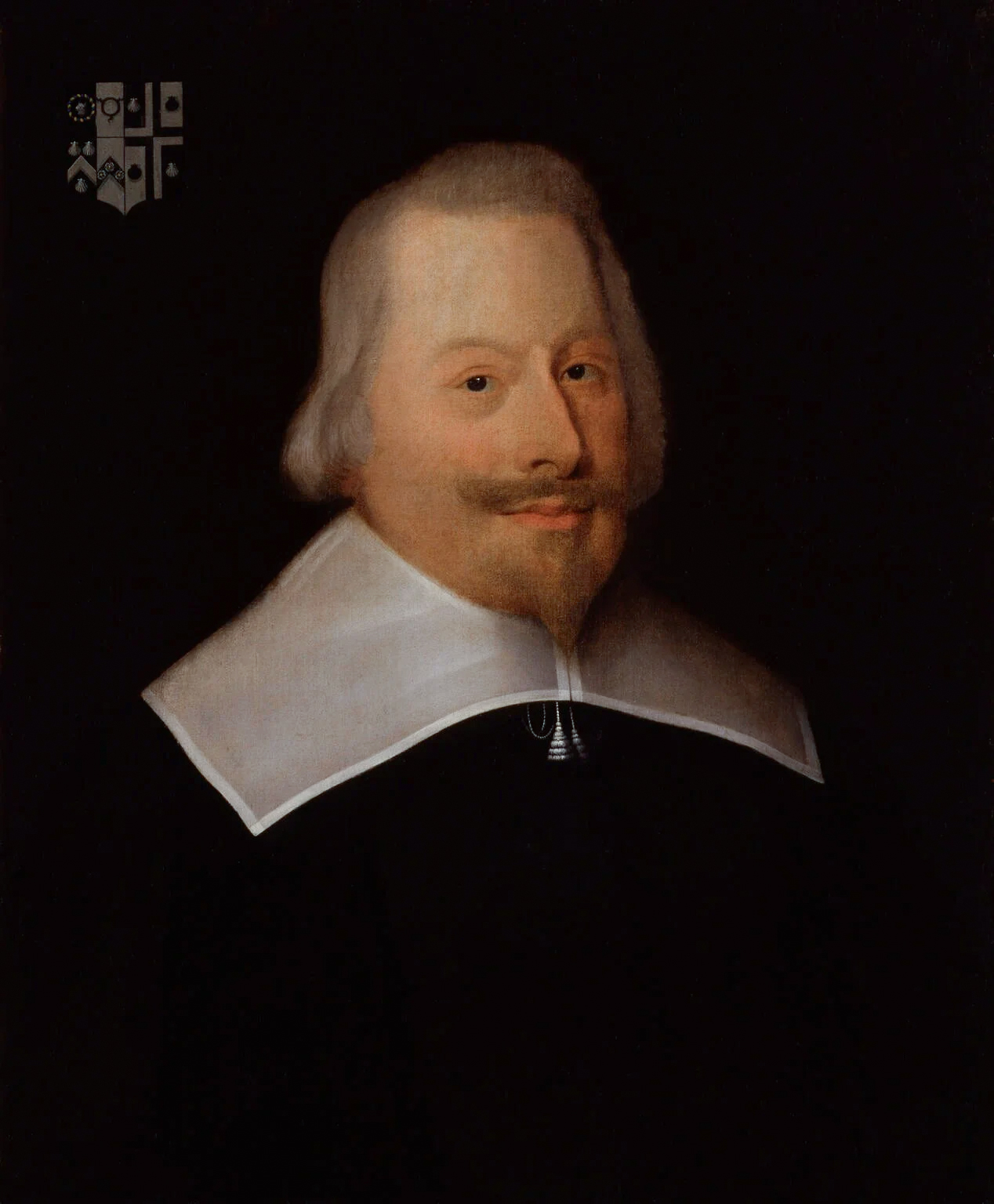
John Pym (Tavistock)

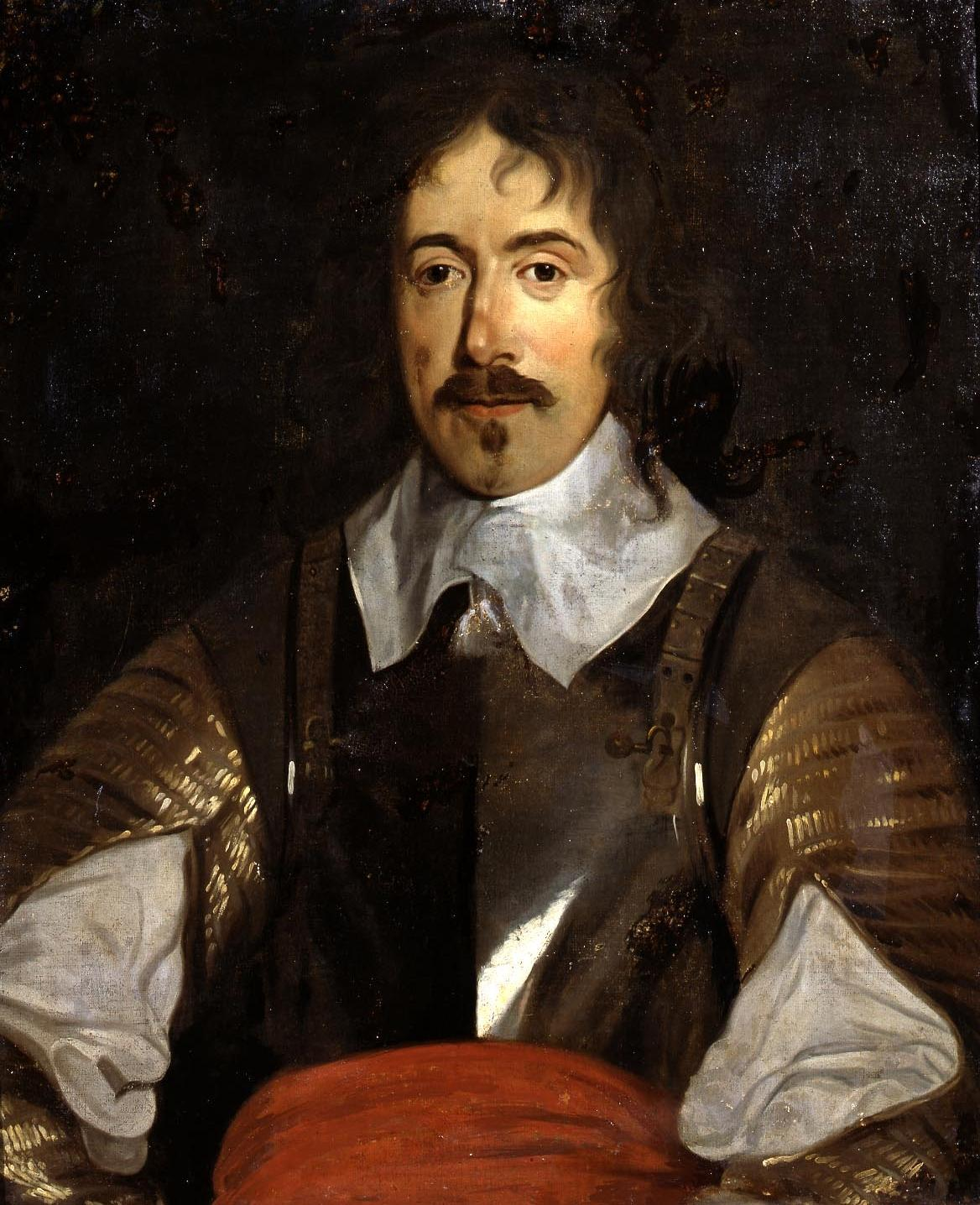
Denzil Holles, 1st Baron Holles of Ifield (Dorchester)

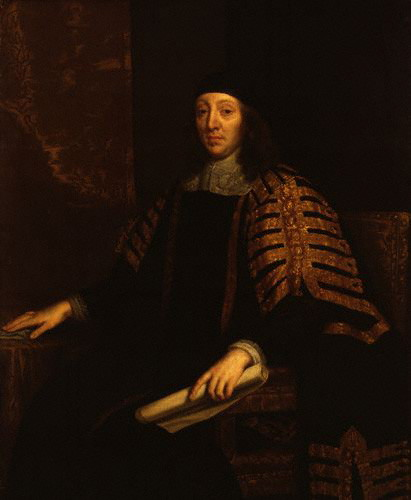
Sir Harbottle Grimston (Colchester)

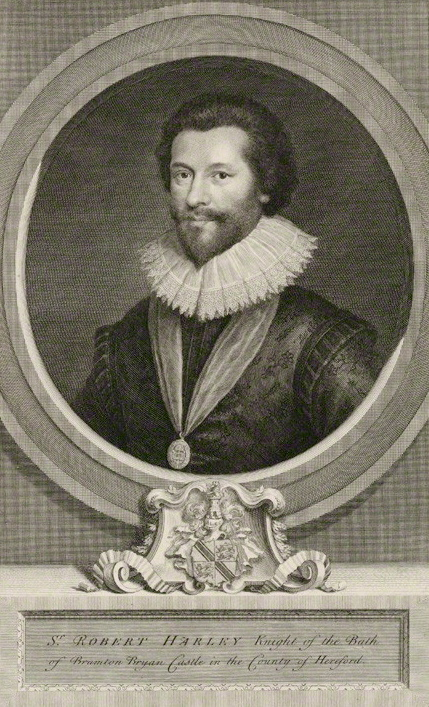
Sir Robert Harley (Herefordshire)

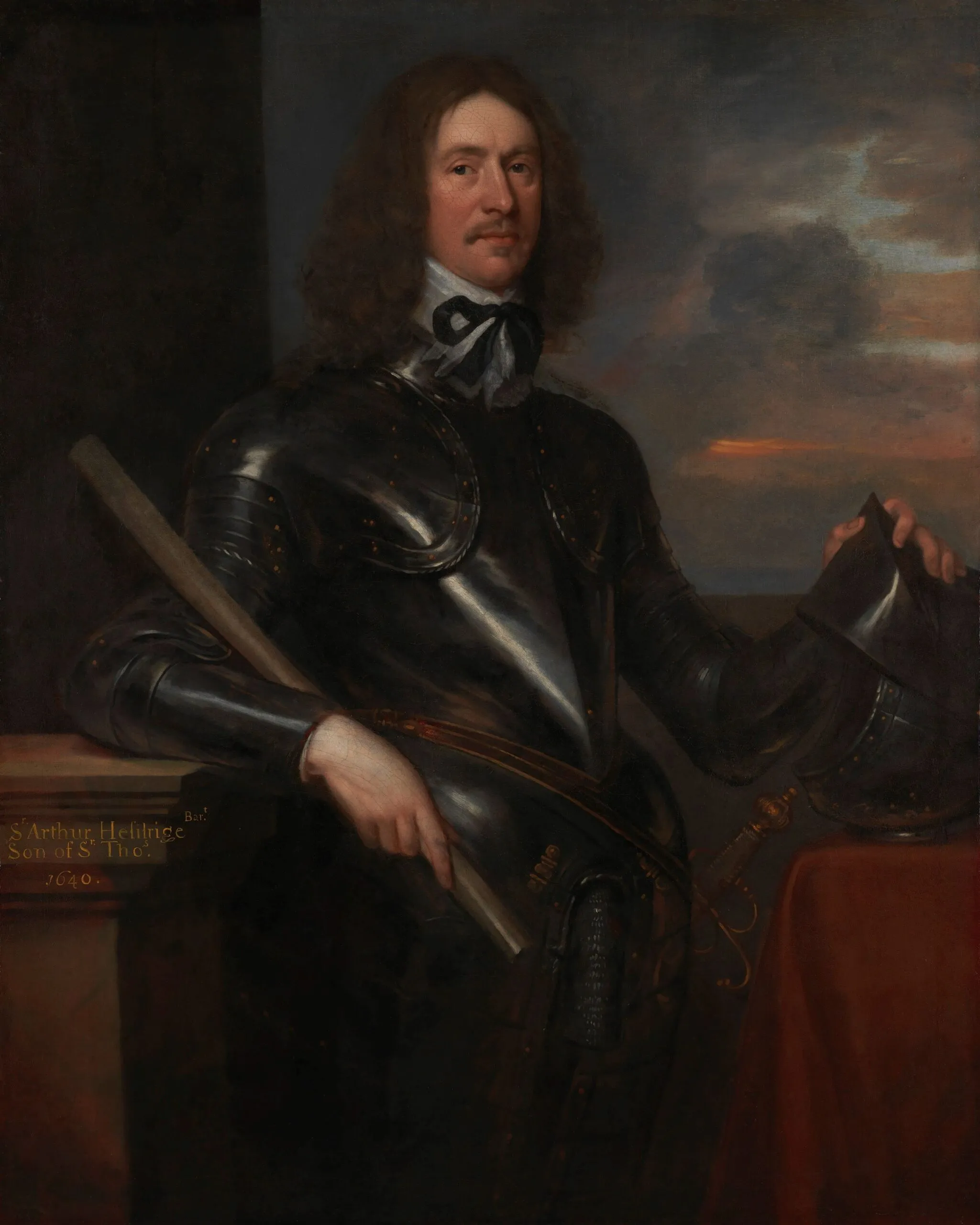
Sir Arthur Haselrig (Leicestershire)

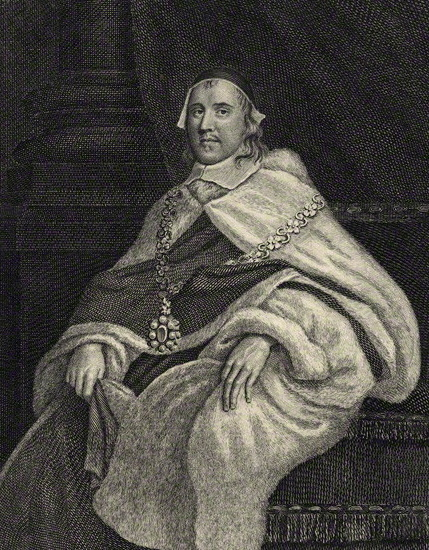
Sir John Glynne (Westminster)

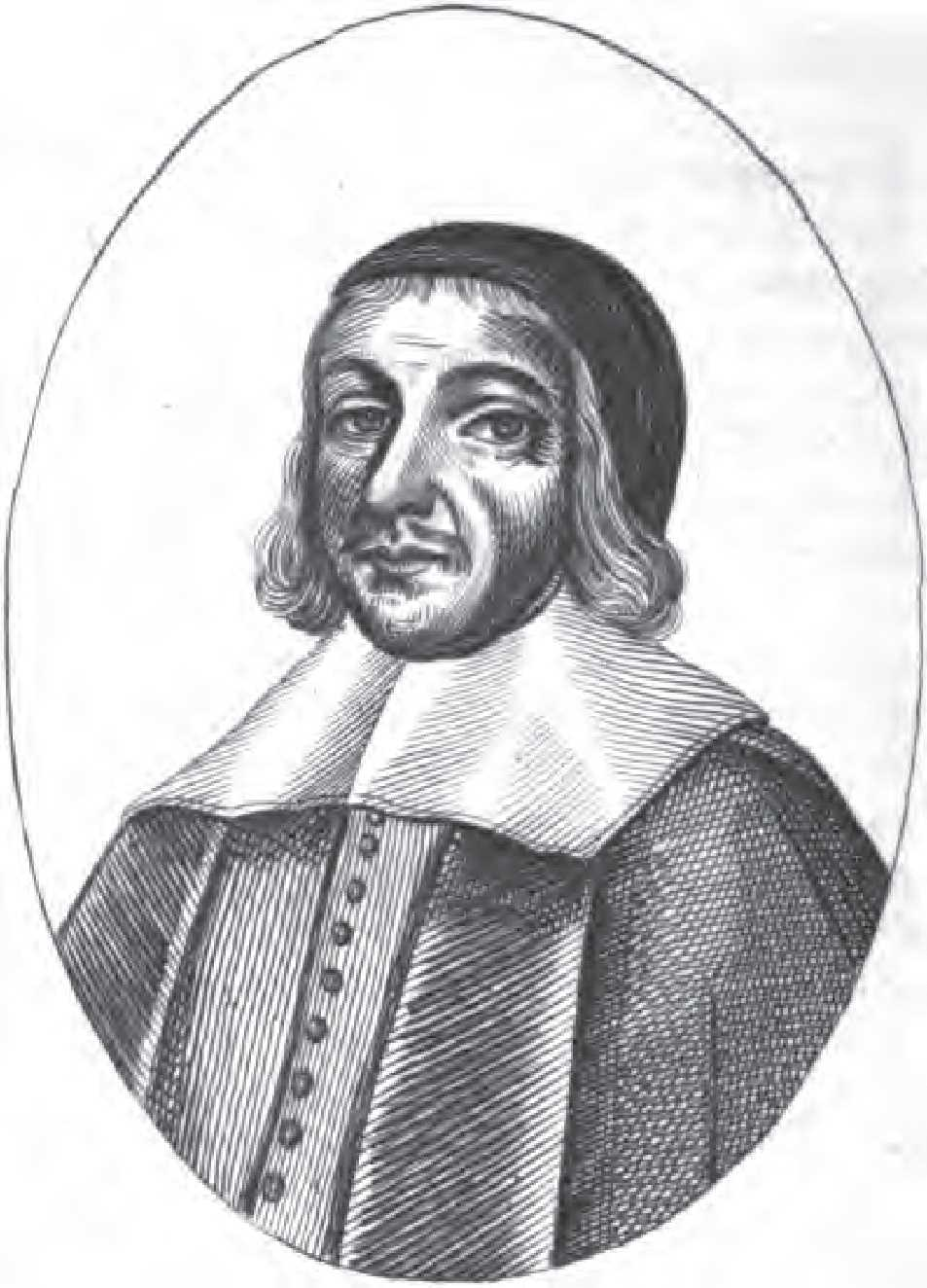
Miles Corbett (Yarmouth)

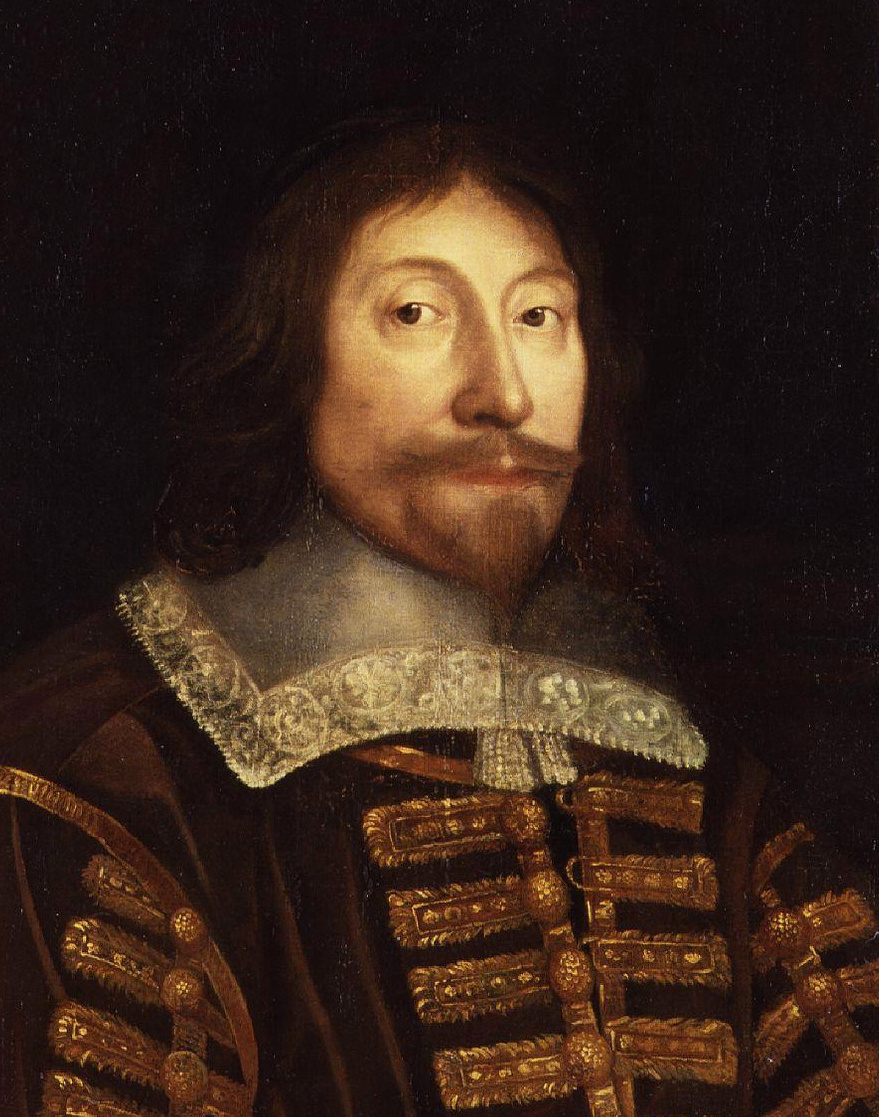
William Lenthall (Speaker)

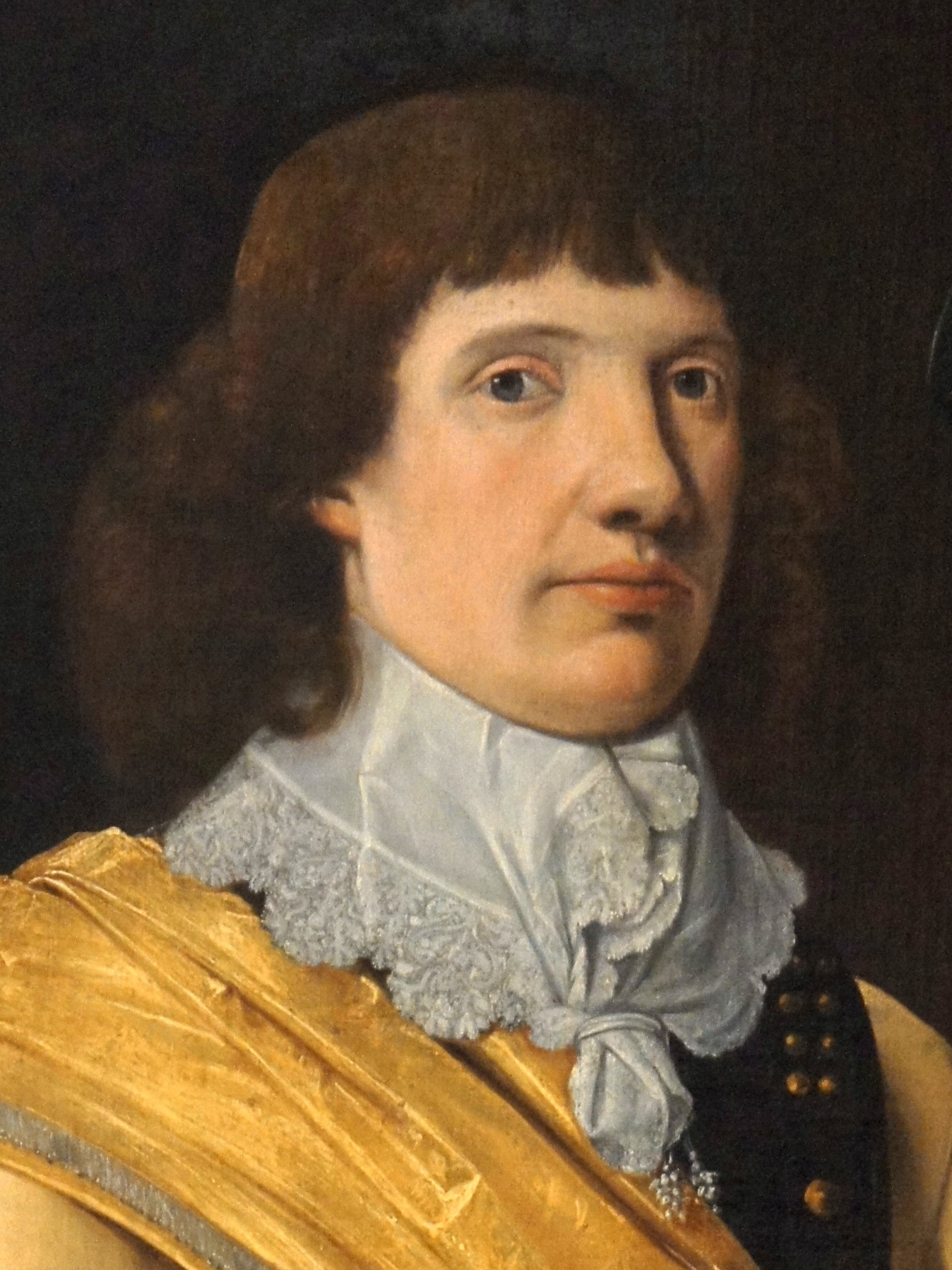
Nathaniel Fiennes (Banbury)

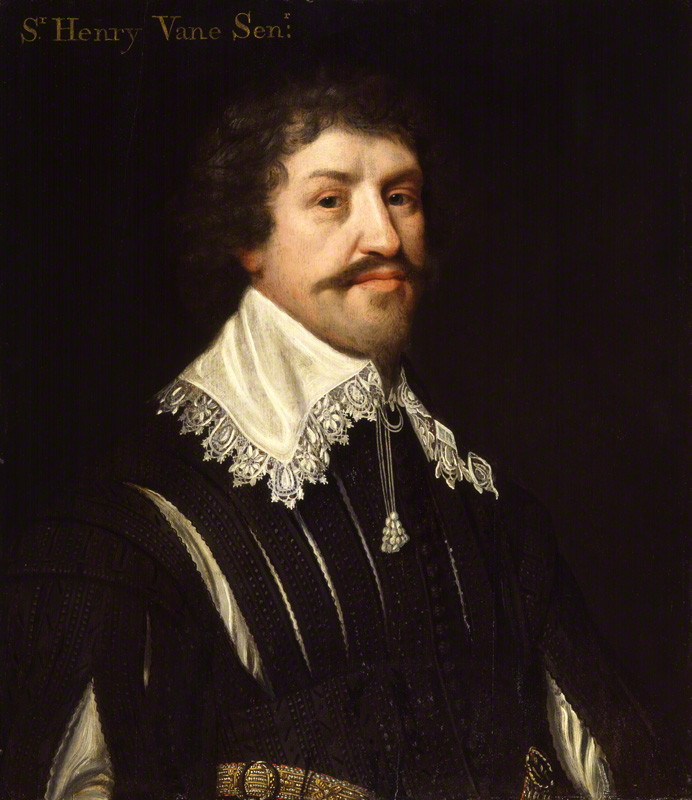
Sir Henry Vane (Wilton)

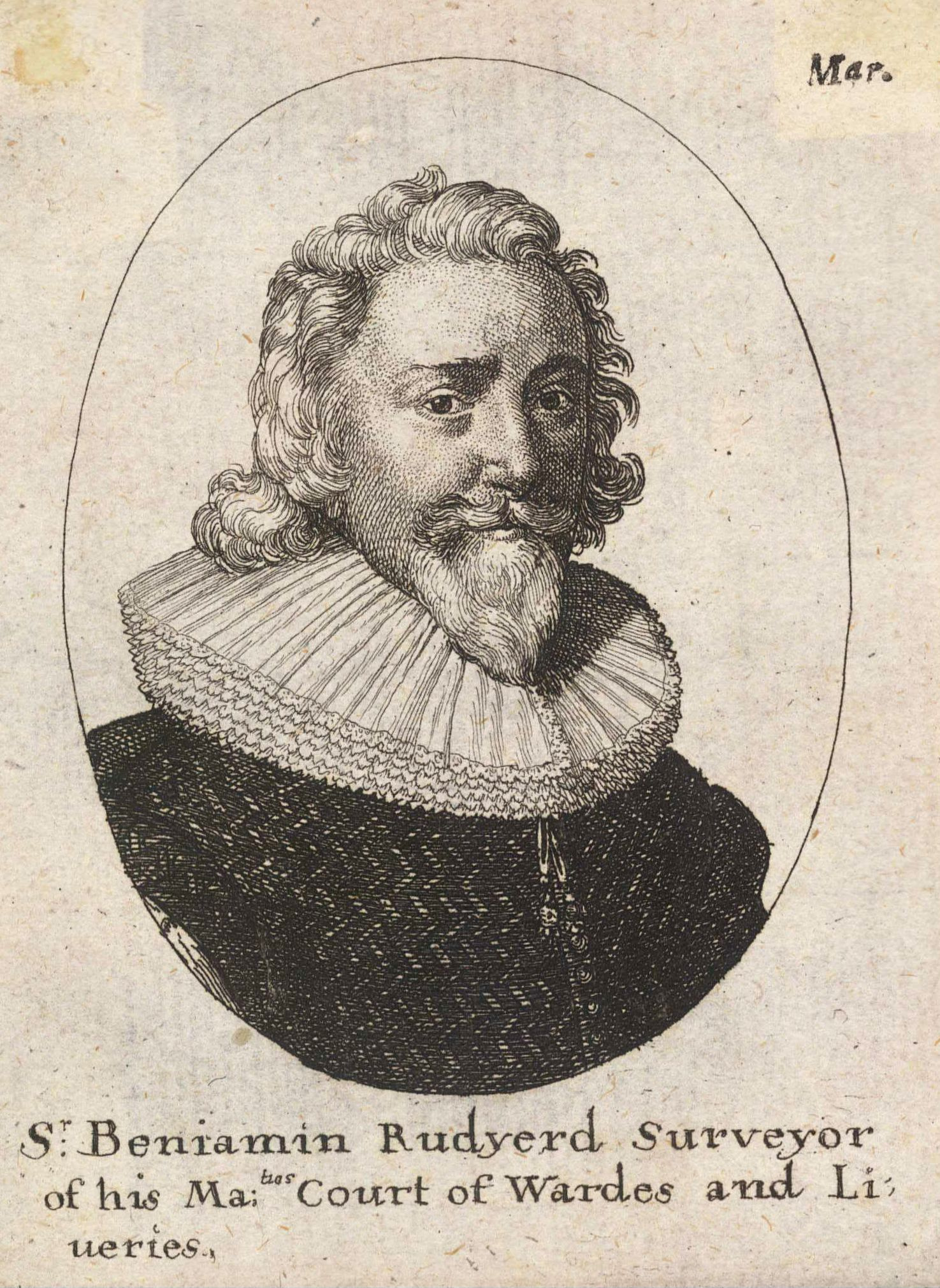
Benjamin Rudyerd (Wilton)

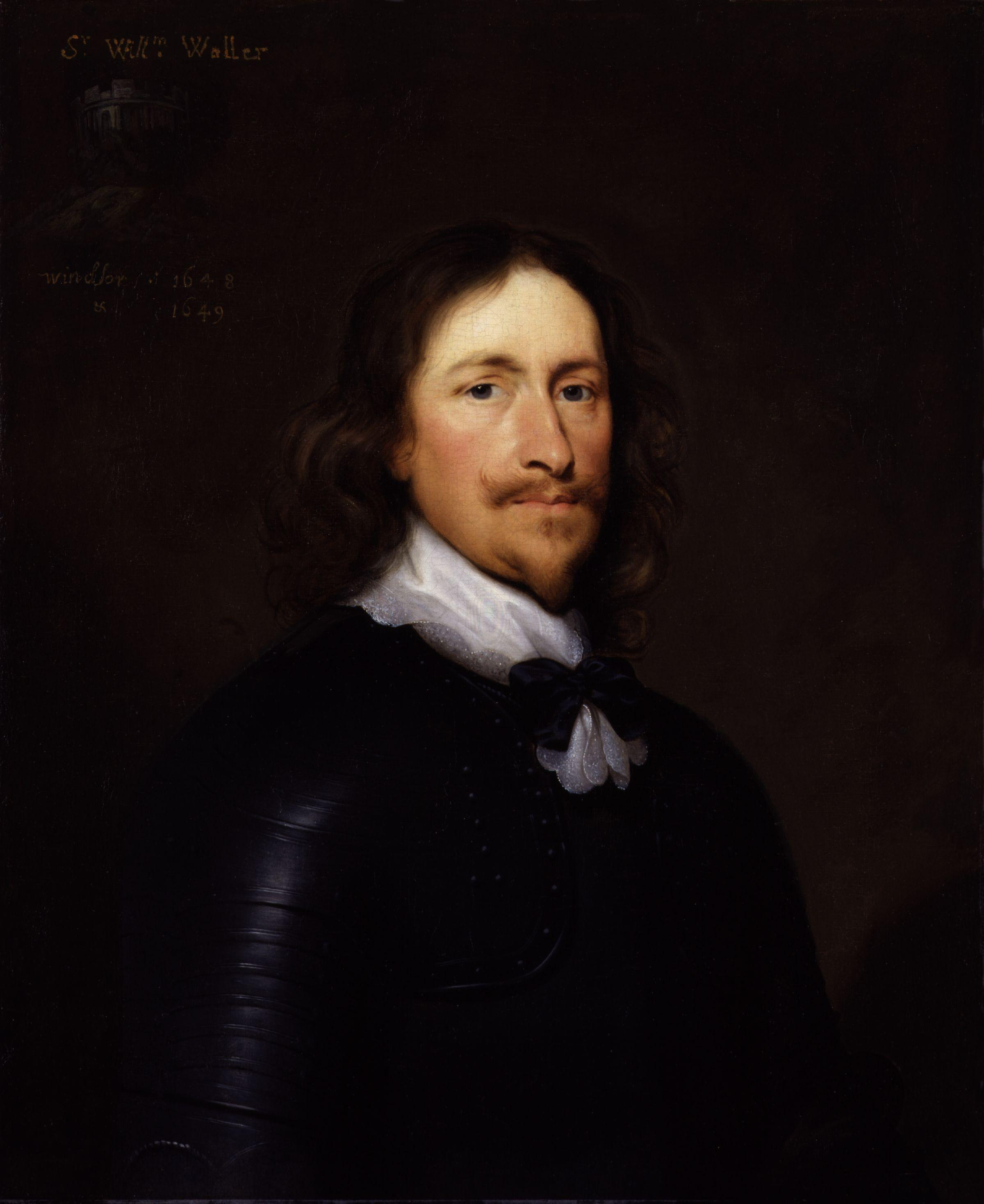
William Waller (Andover)

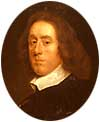
Henry Vane (Hull)

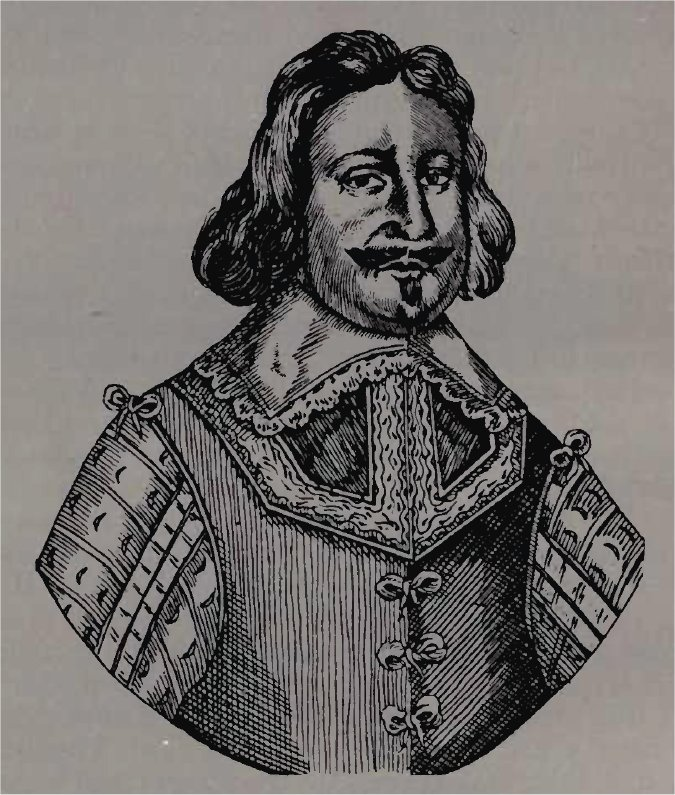
Ferdinando Fairfax, 2nd Lord Fairfax of Cameron (Yorkshire)

=== Bedfordshire ===
Constituency	Members	Notes
Bedfordshire	The Lord Wentworth; Sir Oliver Luke	Wentworth went to the House of Lords 25 November 1640 and was replaced in 1641 by Roger Burgoyne
Bedford	Sir Beauchamp St John; Sir Samuel Luke	
=== Berkshire ===
Constituency	Members	Notes
Berkshire	John Fettiplace; Henry Marten	Fettiplace disabled 22 January 1644; Martin disabled 16 August 1643, but readmitted 6 January 1645
Windsor	Cornelius Holland; William Taylor	(In place of Thomas Rowe and Thomas Walter not duly elected); Taylor expelled 27 May 1641 and replaced by Richard Winwood
Reading	Sir Francis Knollys sen. Sir Francis Knollys jun.	Knollys junior died in 1643
Abingdon	Sir George Stonhouse Bt	Disabled 22 January 1644
Wallingford	Edmund Dunch; Thomas Howard	Howard disabled 22 January 1644
=== Buckinghamshire ===
Constituency	Members	Notes
Buckinghamshire	John Hampden; Arthur Goodwin	Hampden killed in June 1643; Goodwin died August 1643
Buckingham	Sir Peter Temple; Sir Alexander Denton	Denton disabled 22 January 1644
Wycombe	Sir Edmund Verney; Thomas Lane	Verney killed October 1642
Aylesbury	Sir John Pakington, Bt; Ralph Verney	Pakington disabled 20 August 1642; Verney disabled 22 September 1645
Amersham	William Cheyney; William Drake	Cheyney died 1641
Wendover	Robert Croke; Thomas Fountaine	Croke disabled 15 November 1643; Fountain died in 1646
Marlow	John Borlase; Gabriel Hippesley	Election declared void Replaced by Bulstrode Whitelocke and Peregrine Hoby
=== Cambridgeshire ===
Constituency	Members	Notes
Cambridgeshire	Sir Dudley North Bt. Thomas Chicheley	Chicheley disabled 16 September 1642
Cambridge University	Henry Lucas; Thomas Eden	Eden died 1644
Cambridge	Oliver Cromwell; John Lowry	
=== Cheshire ===
Constituency	Members	Notes
Cheshire	Peter Venables; Sir William Brereton, Bt	Venables disabled 22 January 1644
City of Chester	Sir Thomas Smith; Francis Gamull	Smith and Gamul disabled 22 January 1644
=== Cornwall ===
Constituency	Members	Notes
Cornwall	Alexander Carew; Sir Bevil Grenville	Carew disabled 4 September 1643; Grenville disabled 19 September 1642
Launceston	Ambrose Manaton; William Coryton	Coryton expelled for falsifying returns in 1641, replaced by John Harris; Manaton disabled 22 January 1644
Liskeard	John Harris; Joseph Jane	Harris and Jane both disabled 22 January 1644
Lostwithiel	John Trevanion; Richard Arundell	Trevanion killed in action; Arundell disabled 22 January 1644
Truro	John Rolle; Francis Rous	
Bodmin	John Arundell; Anthony Nichols	Arundell disabled 22 January 1644
Helston	Francis Godolphin; Sidney Godolphin	Sidney Godolphin killed in action 1642; Francis Godolphin disabled 22 January 1644
Saltash	George Buller; Edward Hyde	Hyde disabled 11 August 1642; Buller died
Camelford	Piers Edgecumbe; William Glanville	Both disabled 22 January 1644
Grampound	William Coryton; James Campbell	Coryton replaced by Sir John Trevor
Eastlow	Francis Buller; Thomas Lower	Lower disabled 22 January 1644
Westlow	Thomas Arundell; Henry Killigrew	Killigrew disabled 33 January 1644
Penryn	John Bampfylde; Sir Nicholas Slanning	Slanning disabled 9 August 1642
Tregoney	Richard Vyvyan; John Polwhele	Both disabled 22 January 1644
Bossiney	Sir Christopher Yelverton; Sir John Clotworthy	Clotworthy sat for Maldon - replaced by Sir Ralph Sydenham - Sydenham disabled 28 September 1642
St Ives	Francis Godolphin; Viscount L'Isle	Lisle chise Yarmouth, replaced by Edmund Waller; Waller disabled 14 July 1643
Fowey	Jonathan Rashleigh; Sir Richard Buller	Rashleigh disabled 22 January 1644; Buller died
St Germans	Benjamin Valentine; John Moyle jun.	Moyle died
Mitchel	William Chadwell; John Arundell	Arundell chose Bodmin - replaced by Robert Holborne Chadwell disabled 22 January 1644; Holborne disabled 15 August 1642
Newport	Richard Edgecumbe; John Maynard	Maynard chose Totnes but not replaced; Edgcumbe disabled
St Mawes	Dr George Parry; Richard Erisey	Parry disabled 22 January 1644
Callington	Sir Arthur Ingram; George Fane	Ingram died 1642; Fane disabled
=== Cumberland ===
Constituency	Members	Notes
Cumberland	Sir George Dalston; Sir Patricius Curwen, Bt	Both disabled 15 March 1644
Carlisle	Sir William Dalston Bt; Richard Barwis	Dalston disabled 22 January 1644
Cockermouth	Sir John Hippisley; Sir John Fenwick	One seat vacant after Fenwick sat for Northumberland
=== Derbyshire ===
Constituency	Members	Notes
Derbyshire	Sir John Curzon Bt; Sir John Coke	
Derby	William Allestry; Nathaniel Hallowes	Allestry disabled October 1643
=== Devon ===
Constituency	Members	Notes
Devon	Edward Seymour; Thomas Wise	Wise died; Seymour disabled 16 January 1644
Exeter	Robert Walker; Simon Snow	Walker disabled 6 March 1643
Totnes	Oliver St John; John Maynard	
Plymouth	Robert Trelawney; John Waddon	Trelawney expelled - replaced by Sir John Young
Barnstaple	George Peard; Richard Ferris	Pead died; Ferris disabled
Plympton Erle	Michael Oldisworth; Sir Nicholas Slanning	Oldisworth chose Salisbury and Slanning chose Penryn - replaced by Hugh Potter and Sir Thomas Hele, 1st Baronet :Potter and Hele disabled
Tavistock	John Pym; Lord William Russell	Russell ennobled 22 May 1641 - replaced by Hon. John Russell; Russell disabled 22 January 1644; Pym died December 1643
Clifton Dartmouth Hardness	John Upton; Roger Matthew	Upton died 1641; Matthew disabled 5 February 1644
Bere Alston	William Strode; Sir Francis Cheeke	Cheek chose Harwich - replaced by Hugh Pollard; Pollard expelled 9 December 1641; Strode died 1645
Tiverton	Peter Sainthill; George Hartnall	Sainthill disabled 22 January 1644; Hartnall disabled
Ashburton	Sir John Northcote; Sir Edmund Fowell	
Honiton	William Poole; Walter Yonge	Poole disabled 24 June 1643
Okehampton	Edward Thomas; Lawrence Whitaker	
=== Dorset ===
Constituency	Members	Notes
Dorset	Lord Digby; Richard Rogers	Digby ennobled 10 June 1641; Rogers disabled 12 September 1642
Poole	John Pyne; William Constantine	Constantine disabled 4 September 1643
Dorchester	Denzil Holles; Denis Bond	
Lyme Regis	Edmund Prideaux; Richard Rose	
Weymouth	Sir John Strangways; Sir Walter Erle	Strangways disabled 6 September 1642
Melcombe	Gerrard Napier; Richard King	King disabled 27 February 1643; Napier disabled 22 January 1644
Bridport	Giles Strangways; Roger Hill	Strangways disabled 22 January 1644
Shaftesbury	William Whitaker; Samuel Turner	Turner disabled 22 January 1644
Wareham	John Trenchard; Thomas Erle	
Corfe Castle	Sir Francis Windebank; Giles Green	Windebanke fled from the Kingdom. His successor John Borlase disabled 4 March 1644
=== Essex ===
Constituency	Members	Notes
Essex	Lord Rich; Sir William Masham Bt	Rich elevated to House of Lords 27 January 1641 - replaced by Sir Martin Lumley, 1st Baronet
Colchester	Harbottle Grimston (junior); Sir Thomas Barrington Bt	Barrington died 1644
Maldon	Sir Henry Mildmay; Sir John Clotworthy	
Harwich	Harbottle Grimston (senior); Sir Thomas Cheek	
=== Gloucestershire ===
Constituency	Members	Notes
Gloucestershire	John Dutton; Nathaniel Stephens	Dutton disabled
Gloucester	Thomas Pury; Henry Brett	Brett disabled
Cirencester	Sir Theobald Gorges; John George	Gorges disabled 22 January 1644; George also disabled
Tewkesbury	Sir Robert Cooke; Edward Stephens	Election originally voided for double return with Edward Alford; Cooke died 1643
=== Hampshire ===
Constituency	Members	Notes
Hampshire	Sir Henry Wallop; Richard Whitehead	
Winchester	John Lisle; Sir William Ogle	Ogle disabled 24 June 1643
Southampton	George Gallop; Edward Exton	
Portsmouth	George Goring; Edward Dowse	Goring disabled 16 August 1642
Yarmouth	Viscount L'Isle; Sir John Leigh	
Petersfield	Sir William Lewis; William Uvedale	Uvedale disabled
Newport alias Medina	Lucius Viscount Falkland; Henry Worsley	Cary (Falkland) disabled 22 September 1642
Stockbridge	William Heveningham; William Jephson	
Newtown	Sir John Meux, 1st Baronet; Sir John Barrington Bt.	Weston disabled 16 August 1642; Meux disabled 5 February 1644
Christchurch	Henry Tulse; Matthew Davis	Tulse died 1642; Davis disabled 16 March 1643
Whitchurch	Sir Thomas Jervoise; Richard Jervoise	
Lymington	John Button; Henry Campion	
Andover	Robert Wallop; Henry Vernon	Vernon unseated for Sir William Waller
=== Herefordshire ===
Constituency	Members	Notes
Herefordshire	Sir Robert Harley; Fitzwilliam Coningsby	Coningsby expelled as monopolist 30 October 1641 replaced by Humphrey Coningsby who was disabled
Hereford	Richard Weaver; Richard Seaborne	Weaver died May 1642 - replaced by James Scudamore. Scudamore disabled; Seaborne disabled 3 January 1646
Weobley	Arthur Jones Lord Ranelagh; Thomas Tomkins	Tomkins disabled 22 January 1644
Leominster	Sampson Eure; Walter Kyrle	Eure disabled 22 January 1644
=== Hertfordshire ===
Constituency	Members	Notes
Hertfordshire	Sir William Lytton; Arthur Capel	Capel was raised to the peerage 6 August 1641 and replaced by Thomas Dacres
St Albans	Sir John Jennings; Edward Wingate	Jennings died 1642
Hertford	Viscount Cranborne; Sir Thomas Fanshawe	Fanshawe disabled 24 November 1643
=== Huntingdonshire ===
Constituency	Members	Notes
Huntingdonshire	Sir Sidney Montagu; Valentine Walton	Montagu disabled 3 December 1642
Huntingdon	George Montagu; Edward Montagu	
=== Kent (see also Cinque Ports) ===
Constituency	Members	Notes
Kent	Sir Edward Dering; Sir John Colepepper	Dering disabled 2 February 1642 and died 1644; Colepepper disabled 22 January 1644
Canterbury	Sir Edward Masters; John Nutt	
Rochester	Sir Thomas Walsingham; Richard Lee	
Maidstone	Francis Barnham; Sir Humfrey Tufton	Barneham died 1646
Queenborough	Sir Edward Hales; William Harrison	Harrison disabled 24 June 1643; Hales disabled 1648
=== Lancashire ===
Constituency	Members	Notes
Lancashire	Ralph Assheton; Roger Kirkby	Kirby disabled 29 August 1642
Lancaster	John Harrison; Thomas Fanshawe	Fanshawe disabled 7 September 1642; Harrison disabled 4 September 1643
Preston	Richard Shuttleworth; Thomas Standish	Standish died 1642
Newton	William Ashurst; Peter Legh	Legh died after duel February 1642 - replaced by Sir Roger Palmer Palmer disabled 22 January 1644
Wigan	Orlando Bridgeman; Alexander Rigby	Bridgeman disabled 29 August 1642
Clitheroe	Sir Ralph Assheton; Richard Shuttleworth jun.	
Liverpool	Sir Richard Wynn, 2nd Baronet; John Moore	
=== Leicestershire ===
Constituency	Members	Notes
Leicestershire	Sir Arthur Hesilrige; Henry de Grey, Lord Ruthin	de Grey became Earl of Kent in 1643
Leicester	Lord Grey of Groby; Thomas Coke	Coke disabled 22 January 1644
=== Lincolnshire ===
Constituency	Members	Notes
Lincolnshire	Sir John Wray; Sir Edward Ayscough	
Lincoln	Thomas Grantham; John Broxholme	Broxholme died 1647
Boston	Sir Anthony Irby; William Ellis	
Grimsby	Christopher Wray; Sir Gervase Holles	Wray died 1646; Holles disabled 22 August 1642
Stamford	Geoffrey Palmer; Thomas Hatcher	Palmer disabled 7 September 1642
Grantham	Thomas Hussey; Henry Pelham	Hussey died March 1641 - replaced by Sir William Airmine, 1st Baronet
=== Middlesex ===
Constituency	Members	Notes
Middlesex	Sir Gilbert Gerard; Sir John Franklyn	Francklyn died 1647
Westminster	John Glynne; William Bell	
City of London	Sir Thomas Soame; Isaac Penington; Samuel Vassall; Matthew Cradock	Cradock died in 1641 and was replaced by John Venn
=== Monmouthshire ===
Constituency	Members	Notes
Monmouthshire	Sir Charles Williams; William Herbert	Williams died 1641; Herbert disabled 5 February 1644
Monmouth	Thomas Trevor	Disputed election - declared void 29 November 1644
=== Norfolk ===
Constituency	Members	Notes
Norfolk	Sir John Potts; Sir Edmund Moundeford	Moundeford died - replaced by Sir John Hobart, 2nd Baronet in 1641. Hobart died in 1647
Norwich	Richard Harman; Richard Catelyn	Harman died 1645; Catelyn disabled 22 January 1644
King's Lynn	John Perceval; Thomas Toll	Perceval died 1644, his replacement Edmund Hudson expelled 1647
Yarmouth	Miles Corbet; Edward Owner (Recorder)	
Thetford	Sir Thomas Wodehouse; Framlingham Gawdy	
Castle Rising	Sir John Holland, Bt; Sir Christopher Hatton	Hatton sat for Heigham Ferrers - replaced by Sir Robert Hatton; Hatton disabled 7 September 1642
=== Northamptonshire ===
Constituency	Members	Notes
Northamptonshire	Sir Gilbert Pickering, Bt; John Dryden Bt.	
Peterborough	William FitzWilliam; Sir Robert Napier, 2nd Baronet	
Northampton	Zouch Tate; Richard Knightley	
Brackley	John Crew; Sir Martin Lister	
Higham Ferrars	Sir Christopher Hatton	Hatton disabled 7 September 1642
=== Northumberland ===
Constituency	Members	Notes
Northumberland	Sir William Widdrington; Henry Percy	Percy expelled on 9 December 1641 - replacement Sir John Fenwick disabled 22 January 1644; Widdrington disabled 26 August 1642
Newcastle	Sir John Melton; John Blakiston	Melton died 1640 - replacement Sir Henry Anderson disabled 4 September 1643
Berwick upon Tweed	Sir Thomas Widdrington; Sir Edward Osborne	Osborne's election declared void - replaced by Robert Scawen
Morpeth	John Fenwick; Sir William Carnaby	Carnaby disabled 26 August 1642; Fenwick disabled 22 January 1644
=== Nottinghamshire ===
Constituency	Members	Notes
Nottinghamshire	Sir Thomas Hutchinson; Robert Sutton	Hutchinson died 1643; Sutton disabled 1643
Nottingham	Francis Pierrepoint; William Stanhope	Stanhope disabled 1644 replaced by Gilbert Millington
East Retford	Sir Gervase Clifton; Charles Viscount Mansfield	Clifton disabled; Mansfield disabled 22 January 1644
=== Oxfordshire ===
Constituency	Members	Notes
Oxfordshire	Thomas Viscount Wenman; Hon. James Fiennes	
Oxford University	Sir Thomas Roe; John Selden	Roe died by 1644
Oxford	John Whistler; John Smith	Whistler and Smith both disabled 18 November 1646
Woodstock	William Lenthall; Sir Robert Pye	Lenthall was Speaker; Pye in place of William Herbert
Banbury	Nathaniel Fiennes	
=== Rutland ===
Constituency	Members	Notes
Rutland	Sir Guy Palmes; Hon. Baptist Noel	Noel succeeded to peerage 1643; Palmes disabled 28 September 1643
=== Salop ===
Constituency	Members	Notes
Shropshire	Sir Richard Lee, 2nd Baronet; Sir Richard Newport	Lee disabled 6 September 1642; Newport ennobled 14 October 1642
Shrewsbury	Francis Newport; William Spurstow	Newport disabled 22 January 1643; Spurstow died
Bridgnorth	(Sir) Thomas Whitmore; Edward Acton	Acton and Whitmore both disabled 5 February 1644
Ludlow	Charles Baldwin; Ralph Goodwin	Baldwin and Goodwin disabled 5 February 1644
Wenlock	William Pierrepont; Sir Thomas Littleton, Bt	Littleton disabled 5 February 1644
Bishops Castle	Robert Howard; Richard Moor	Howard disabled 6 September 1642; Moor died by 1644
=== Somerset ===
Constituency	Members	Notes
Somerset	Sir John Poulett; Sir John Stawell	Powlett and Stawell both disabled 8 August 1642
Bristol	Humphrey Hooke; Richard Longe	Hooke and Longe expelled as monopolists 1642; Replaced by John Glanville and John Tailer both disabled 25 September 1645
Bath	William Bassett; Alexander Popham	Bassett disabled 5 February 1644
Wells	Sir Ralph Hopton; Sir Edward Rodney	Hopton disabled 5 August 1642; Rodney disabled 12 August 1642
Taunton	Sir William Portman; George Searle	Portman disabled 5 February 1644
Bridgwater	Peter Wroth; Edmund Wyndham	Wyndham expelled 1641, his replacement Thomas Smith disabled 5 August 1642; Wroth died 1644
Minehead	Sir Francis Popham; Alexander Luttrell	Luttrell died 1642, replacement Thomas Hanham disabled 1644; Popham died 1644
Ilchester	Edward Phelips; Robert Hunt	Phelips and Hunt disabled 5 February 1644
Milborne Port	Edward Kyrton; John Digby	Kyrton disabled 11 August 1642; Digby disabled 5 August 1642
=== Staffordshire ===
Constituency	Members	Notes
Staffordshire	Sir Edward Littleton; Hervey Bagot	Bagot disabled 24 November 1642; Littleton disabled 4 March 1644
Stafford	Ralph Sneyd; Richard Weston	Weston disabled 1642; Sneyd disabled 20 May 1643
Newcastle under Lyme	Sir Richard Leveson; Sir John Merrick	Leveson disabled 24 November 1642
Lichfield	Sir Richard Cave; Michael Noble	Cave disabled 30 August 1642
Tamworth	Ferdinando Stanhope; Henry Wilmot	Wilmot expelled 9 December 1641; Stanhope killed in action 1643
=== Suffolk ===
Constituency	Members	Notes
Suffolk	Sir Nathaniel Barnardiston; Sir Philip Parker	
Ipswich	John Gurdon; William Cage	Cage died by 1644
Dunwich	Henry Coke; Anthony Bedingfield	Coke disabled 7 September 1642
Orford	Sir William Playters, 2nd Baronet; Sir Charles le Grosse	
Aldeburgh	Squire Bence; Captain Rainsborough	Rainsborough died 1641 replaced by Alexander Bence
Sudbury	(Sir) Simonds d'Ewes; Sir Robert Crane	Crane died 1643
Eye	Sir Frederick Cornwallis; Sir Roger North	Cornwallis disabled 23 September 1642
Bury St Edmunds	Thomas Jermyn; Sir Thomas Barnardiston	Jermyn disabled 14 February 1644
=== Surrey ===
Constituency	Members	Notes
Surrey	Sir Richard Onslow; Sir Ambrose Browne	
Southwark	Edward Bagshawe; John White	White died 1643; Bagshawe disabled 22 January 1644
Bletchingly	John Evelyn, senior Edward Bysshe jun.	
Reigate	William Lord Monson; Sir Thomas Bludder	Bludder disabled
Guildford	Sir Robert Parkhurst; George Abbotts	Abbotts died 1645
Gatton	Sir Samuel Owfield; Thomas Sandys	Owfield died 1644
Haslemere	John Goodwin; Poynings More	
=== Sussex - see also Cinque Ports ===
Constituency	Members	Notes
Sussex	Sir Thomas Pelham Bt; Anthony Stapley	
Chichester	Christopher Lewknor; Sir William Morley	Lewknor disabled 2 September 1642; Morley disabled 23 November 1642
Horsham	Thomas Middleton; Hall Ravenscroft .	
Midhurst	Thomas May; William Cawley	May disabled 23 November 1642
Lewes	Herbert Morley; James Rivers	Rivers died 1641 replaced by Henry Shelley
New Shoreham	John Alford; William Marlott	
Bramber	Sir Thomas Bowyer; Arthur Onslow	Bowyer disabled 23 November 1642
Steyning	Thomas Leedes; Sir Thomas Farnefold	Leedes disabled 23 November 1642; Farnefold died in 1643
East Grinstead	Lord Buckhurst; Robert Goodwin	Buckhurst disabled 5 February 1643
Arundel	Henry Garton; Sir Edward Alford	Garton died; Alford disabled 22 January 1644
=== Warwickshire ===
Constituency	Members	Notes
Warwickshire	Richard Shuckburgh; James Compton	Compton inherited peerage 1643; Shuckburgh disabled 11 October 1644
Coventry	John Barker; Simon Norton	Norton died in 1641 and was replaced by William Jesson
Warwick	William Purefoy; Sir Thomas Lucy	Lucy died 1640 replaced by Godfrey Bosvile
=== Westmorland ===
Constituency	Members	Notes
Westmoreland	Sir Philip Musgrave; Sir Henry Bellingham	Musgrave disabled 15 March 1643; Bellingham disabled 11 October 1645
Appleby	Viscount Dungarvan; Sir John Brooke	Brooke disabled 15 March 1643; Dungarvan disabled 1643
=== Wiltshire ===
Constituency	Members	Notes
Wiltshire	Sir James Thynne; Sir Henry Ludlow	Thynne disabled 1642; Ludlow died 1644
Salisbury	Robert Hyde; Michael Oldisworth	Hyde disabled 4 August 1642
Wilton	Sir Henry Vane (the elder); Sir Benjamin Rudyerd	
Downton	Sir Edward Griffin; Sir Anthony Ashley Cooper	Cooper's election disputed and he never sat; Griffin disabled on 5 February 1644
Hindon	Robert Reynolds; Miles Fleetwood	Fleetwood died 1641 - replacement Thomas Bennett died 1644
Heytesbury	Thomas Moore; Edward Ashe	
Westbury	William Wheler; John Ashe	
Calne	George Lowe; Hugh Rogers	Lowe disabled 5 February 1644
Devizes	Edward Bayntun; Robert Nicholas	
Chippenham	Sir Edward Hungerford; Sir Edward Bayntun	
Malmesbury	Sir Neville Poole; Sir Anthony Hungerford	Hungerford disabled 1644
Cricklade	Robert Jenner; Thomas Hodges	
Great Bedwyn	Sir Walter Smith; Richard Hardinge	Smith and Hardinge both disabled 5 February 1644
Ludgershall	William Ashburnham; Sir John Evelyn	Ashburnham expelled 1641
Old Sarum	Hon. Robert Cecil; Edward Herbert	Herbert impeached 1641; replacement Sir William Savile disabled 6 September 1642
Wootton Bassett	Edward Poole; William Pleydell	Pleydell disabled 5 February 1644
Marlborough	John Francklyn; Sir Francis Seymour	Seymour raised to the peerage 1641; Francklyn died
=== Worcestershire ===
Constituency	Members	Notes
Worcestershire	John Wilde; Humphrey Salwey	
Worcester	John Coucher; John Nash	
Droitwich	Endymion Porter; Samuel Sandys	Sandys disabled 20 August 1642; Porter disabled 10 March 1643
Evesham	Richard Cresheld; William Sandys	Sandys expelled 1641, replacement John Coventry disabled 12 August 1642
Bewdley	Sir Henry Herbert	Herbert disabled 20 August 1642
=== Yorkshire ===
Constituency	Members	Notes
Yorkshire	Ferdinando, Lord Fairfax; Henry Belasyse	Belasyse disabled 6 September 1642; Fairfax died 1648
York	Sir William Allanson; Thomas Hoyle (Alderman)	
Kingston upon Hull	Sir Henry Vane, junior Sir John Lister	Lister died 1640 - replaced by Peregrine Pelham
Knaresborough	Sir Henry Slingsby; Henry Benson	Benson expelled 2 November 1641 - disputed election returned William Deerlove and then William Constable; Slingsby disabled 6 September 1642
Scarborough	Sir Hugh Cholmeley; John Hotham	Cholmeley disabled 3 April 1643; Hotham disabled 8 September 1643
Ripon	William Mallory; John Mallory	W Mallory disabled 6 September 1642; J Mallory disabled 16 January 1644
Richmond	Sir William Pennyman, Bt. Sir Thomas Danby	Pennyman disabled 11 August 1642; Danby disabled 6 September 1642
Hedon	Sir William Strickland; John Alured	
Boroughbridge	Sir Philip Stapylton; Sir Thomas Mallaverer Bt	Stapleton died 1647
Thirsk	John Belasyse; Sir Thomas Ingram	Belasyse and Ingram both disabled 6 September 1642
Aldborough	Richard Aldborough; Robert Strickland	Strickland disabled 21 January 1643; Aldborough disabled 6 September 1642
Beverley	Sir John Hotham Bt; Michael Warton	Hotham disabled 7 September 1643; Warton disabled 22 January 1644
Pontefract	Sir George Wentworth of Woolley; Sir George Wentworth of Wentworth Woodhouse	Wentworth of Woolley disabled 6 September 1642; Wentworth of Woodhouse disabled 22 January 1644
Malton	Thomas Hebblethwaite; John Wastell	Hebblethwaite disabled 29 November 1644
Northallerton	Sir Henry Cholmley; Sir John Ramsden	Ramsden disabled April 1644
=== Cinque Ports ===
Hastings	John Ashburnham; Thomas Eversfield	Ashburnham and Eversfield both disabled 5 February 1644
Romney	(Sir) Norton Knatchbull; Thomas Webb	Webb expelled 21 January 1642 as monopolist - replaced by Richard Browne
Hythe	Henry Heyman; John Harvey	Harvey died 1645
Dover	Sir Edward Boys; Sir Peter Heyman	Heyman died 1641 replaced by Benjamin Weston
Sandwich	Sir Thomas Peyton; Sir Edward Partridge	Peyton disabled 5 February 1644
Seaford	Sir Thomas Parker; Francis Gerard	
Rye	John White; Sir John Jacob, 1st Baronet	Jacob expelled 1641 replaced by William Hay; White disabled 5 February 1644
Winchelsea	John Finch; Nicholas Crisp	Crisp expelled 1641- replacement William Smith disabled 1644; Finch died 1642
=== Wales ===
Constituency	Members	Notes
Anglesey	John Bodvel	Bodvel disabled 5 February 1644
Newburgh	John Griffith	Griffith died 10 August 1642
Brecknockshire	William Morgan	
Brecknock	Herbert Price	Price disabled
Cardiganshire	Walter Lloyd	Lloyd disabled 5 February 1644
Cardigan	John Vaughan	Vaughan disabled 1 September 1645
Carmarthenshire	Henry Vaughan	Vaughan disabled 1644
Carmarthen	Francis Lloyd	Lloyd disabled 5 February 1644
Carnarvonshire	John Griffith jun	Griffith disabled 10 August 1642
Carnarvon	William Thomas	Thomas disabled 5 February 1644
Denbighshire	Thomas Middleton	
Denbigh Boroughs	Simon Thelwall	
Flintshire	John Mostyn	Mostyn disabled 5 February 1644
Flint	John Salusbury	Salusbiry disabled 5 February 1644
Glamorgan	Philip, Lord Herbert	
Cardiff	William Herbert	Killed at Battle of Edgehill Oct 1642. No representation 1642-1645
Merioneth	William Price	Price disabled 5 February 1644
Montgomeryshire	Sir John Pryce, 1st Baronet	Pryse disabled 20 October 1645
Montgomery	Richard Herbert	Herbert disabled 12 September 1642
Pembrokeshire	John Wogan	died by 1644
Pembroke	Hugh Owen	
Haverford West	Sir John Stepney, 3rd Baronet	disabled
Radnorshire	Charles Price	Price disabled 1642
Radnor	Philip Warwick	Warwick disabled 5 February 1644

== See also ==
- List of parliaments of England
- List of parliaments of Great Britain
- List of parliaments of the United Kingdom
