= Recruiter election =

17th-century by-elections to the Parliament of England

Recruiter elections were held during the seventeenth century to fill vacant seats in the House of Commons in England. The words 'recruit' and 'recruiter' meant nothing more than filling a vacancy, so the contemporary phrase' recruiter member of parliament meant a member of the House of Commons who had been elected through a by-election.

During the English Civil War and Interregnum, no national or general elections were held in England for fourteen years, from the 1640 elections to the Long Parliament, until the 1654 elections to the First Protectorate Parliament. From 1645, the many vacant seats that arose in the Long and Rump Parliaments, by death and arbitrary expulsion (initially of many Royalist members, and later of many Leveller and Puritan members in Pride's military coup d'état) were filled by by-elections, or so-called 'recruiter elections'.

It seems clear that there was some stage management of the recruiter elections; indeed, it has been suggested that the recruiter elections during the Civil War led to the change in character of elections from an Elizabethan model based on clientship and personality, to the beginning of a system managed by party politics.
