= Sir Thomas Strickland, 2nd Baronet =

English politician

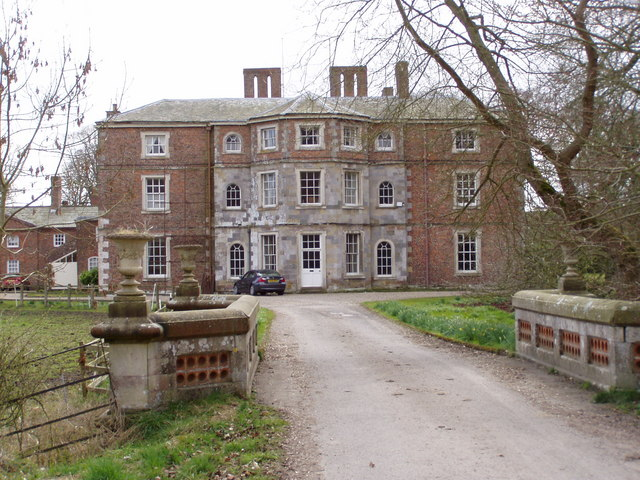
Boynton Hall – seat of the Strickland baronets

Sir Thomas Strickland, 2nd Baronet (c. 1639 – 20 November 1684) was an English politician who sat in the House of Commons in 1659.

Strickland was son of Sir William Strickland, 1st Baronet of Boynton, East Riding of Yorkshire, and his second wife Frances Finch, daughter of Thomas Finch, 2nd Earl of Winchilsea. In 1659, he was elected member of parliament for Beverley and for Hedon in the Third Protectorate Parliament and chose to sit for Beverley. In 1662 he was commissioned as Colonel of the Northallertonshire Regiment, North Riding Militia. He succeeded to the baronetcy and Boynton Hall on the death of his father in 1673.

Strickland married Elizabeth Pile, daughter of Sir Francis Pile, 2nd Baronet of Compton Beauchamp, Berkshire, on 19 November 1659. They had ten children:

- Jane Strickland (died 1662)
- Elizabeth Strickland (died 1664)
- Sir William Strickland, 3rd Baronet (1665–1724)
- Walter Strickland (1667–1730)
- Frances Strickland, who married Sir Richard Osbaldeston in 1679
- Thomas Strickland (born 1669, died young)
- Anne Strickland, who married John Smith, MP, Speaker of the House of Commons and Chancellor of the Exchequer
- Admiral Sir Charles Strickland (1672–1724)
- Nathaniel Strickland
- Frances Strickland

== Bibliography ==
- J Foster, Pedigrees of the County Families of Yorkshire (1874)

Parliament of England
Preceded by Francis Thorpe	Member of Parliament for Beverley; 1659; With: John Anlaby	Succeeded by James Nelthorpe
Baronetage of England
Preceded by William Strickland	Baronet (of Boynton); 1673–1684	Succeeded by William Strickland
