= Thomas Atkins (Lord Mayor) =

English politician

Thomas Atkins was Lord Mayor of London and an English politician who sat in the House of Commons in 1640 and from 1647 to 1653 and was Lord Mayor of London in 1644. He supported the Parliamentary cause in the English Civil War.

== Biography ==
Atkins was the son of John Atkins of King's Lynn, Norfolk. He was an alderman of Norwich, and then an alderman of the City of London for Bridge Without, from Lime Street. He was Sheriff of London in 1637, and colonel of the Red Regiment, London Trained Bands, in 1642.

In April 1640, Atkins was elected member of parliament for Norwich in the Short Parliament. He was imprisoned in the Tower of London in May 1640 with three other aldermen – Nicholas Rainton, Thomas Soame and John Gayre – for refusing to list the inhabitants of his ward who were able to contribute £50 or more to a loan for King Charles. During the Civil War he was colonel of the Norwich city militia. He was Lord Mayor of London in 1644. In 1647 Atkins was re-elected MP for Norwich for the Long Parliament and sat until 1653. On Thursday, 7 January 1649, he delivered a solemn thanksgiving to Oliver Cromwell and also issued a Hosannah on 7 June 1649. He was a "busy stickler for independency and republicanism", and the principal tool by which the Rump Parliament managed the common council of London.

Atkkins was knighted by the Lord Protector Oliver Cromwell on 5 December 1657 (the title passed into oblivion at the restoration of the Monarchy in 1660). He was Father of the City in 1658 and was discharged from his position as Alderman on 12 February 1661.

Parliament of England
Parliament suspended since 1629	Member of Parliament for Norwich; 1640; With: Thomas Tooley	Succeeded by Richard Harman; Richard Catelyn
Preceded by Richard Harman; Richard Catelyn	Member of Parliament for Norwich; 1647–1653; With: Erasmus Earle	Not represented in Barebones Parliament
Civic offices
Preceded by Sir John Wollaston	Lord Mayor of London; 1644–1645	Succeeded by Thomas Adams
