= Sir William Strickland, 1st Baronet =

English Member of Parliament

Sir William Strickland, 1st Baronet (c. 1596 – 12 July 1673) was an English Member of Parliament who supported the parliamentary cause during the English Civil War.

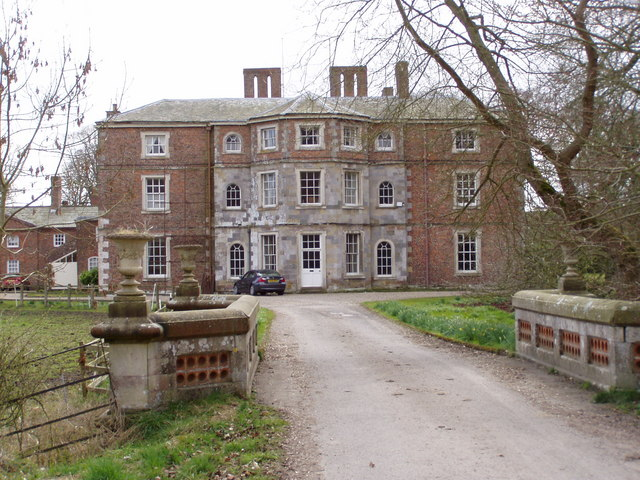
Boynton Hall today – seat of the Strickland baronets

Sir William Strickland was the eldest son of Walter Strickland of Boynton, in the East Riding of Yorkshire, inheriting his estates, including Boynton Hall, on his death in 1636. He was educated at Queens' College, Cambridge, and proceeded to Gray's Inn though he seems not to have qualified as a barrister.

He was knighted in 1630, and in 1640 was elected to Parliament as member for Hedon. Initially he seems to have been a friend and supporter of Thomas Wentworth, 1st Earl of Strafford, to whom he was distantly related (Strickland's mother was a Wentworth), although he is not one of the MPs who was listed as voting against Strafford's attainder. Strickland was a strict Puritan, and after Strafford's death he moved firmly towards the Parliamentary cause, although the king created him a baronet on 29 July 1641, perhaps hoping to sway him towards support for the Crown.

Strickland sat for Hedon throughout the Long Parliament, taking a hard line in support of the Commonwealth and later of Cromwell. (An opposition pamphleteer described him as "for settling the Protector anew in all those things for which the king was cut off". He also spoke frequently in favour of the punishment of James Naylor. After the expulsion of the Rump, he did not appear in the Barebone's Parliament, but was elected for the Protectorate Parliaments of as one of the four members for the East Riding in 1654 and 1656. He was subsequently summoned to Cromwell's House of Peers as Lord Strickland. (His younger brother, Walter Strickland, was also a member, and held a number of other senior offices during the Commonwealth.) Strickland sat in the restored Long Parliament in 1659, but apparently took no part in its proceedings and (unlike his brother) seems to have retired entirely from public affairs after the Restoration, though he was not molested by the authorities.

From 1642 to 1646, Strickland was Custos Rotulorum of the East Riding of Yorkshire.

He was married twice – on 18 June 1622 to Margaret, daughter of Sir Richard Cholmley of Whitby; and, after his first wife's death in 1629 to Frances Finch, daughter of Thomas Finch, 2nd Earl of Winchilsea. He had four daughters by his first marriage, and one son, Thomas, by his second, who succeeded him in the baronetcy.

== Sources ==
- Dictionary of National Biography
- J Foster, Pedigrees of the County Families of Yorkshire (1874)
- Victoria County History of the East Riding of Yorkshire
- Who’s Who in Yorkshire (1912)

Parliament of England
Preceded by Sir Philip Stapleton; John Alured	Member of Parliament for Hedon; 1640–1653; With: John Alured 1640–1651	Succeeded by Constituency not represented until 1659
Honorary titles
Preceded by Sir William Alford	Custos Rotulorum of the East Riding of Yorkshire; 1642–1646	Interregnum
Baronetage of England
New creation	Baronet (of Boynton); 1641–1673	Succeeded by Thomas Strickland
