= Richard Lee (MP for Rochester) =

English politician

Richard Lee was an English politician who sat in the House of Commons of England from 1640 to 1648.

== Early life ==
Lee was from a family of Rochester and in 1621 became one of the bridge wardens of Rochester Bridge, a post he held until 1653.

== Career ==
In April 1640, Lee was elected Member of Parliament for Rochester for the Short Parliament. He was re-elected MP for Rochester in November 1640 for the Long Parliament where he sat until he was excluded under Pride's Purge in 1648. Lee was mayor of Rochester in 1643 when he was also appointed a commissioner for Kent to oversee the speedy raising and levying of money for the relief of the Commonwealth.

== See also ==
- List of MPs elected to the English parliament in November 1640

Parliament of England
Vacant Parliament suspended since 1629	Member of Parliament for Rochester; 1640–1648; With: Sir Thomas Walsingham	Succeeded by Sir Thomas Walsingham
