= Richard Catlin =

English landowner and politician

- Born: 1583
- Died: 1662 (aged 78–79); Kirby Cane
- Other names: Catlyn, Catelyn
- Occupations: Norfolk landowner and politician

Richard Catlin IV (1583–1662), also written Catlyn or Catelyn, was an English landowner and politician from a family long associated with the city of Norwich. He was the grandson of Richard Catlin II, a first cousin of Sir Nathaniel Catlin and the father of Sir Nevill Catlin.

== Early life ==
Born in 1583, he was the eldest son of Thomas Catlin (about 1550–1636) and his wife Judith (about 1587–1615), daughter of Edward Elrington of Theydon Bois and his wife Priscilla Whitlam. His father was a landowner holding the manors of Lakenham outside Norwich, Kirby Cane and Wingfield Castle, all of which he inherited.

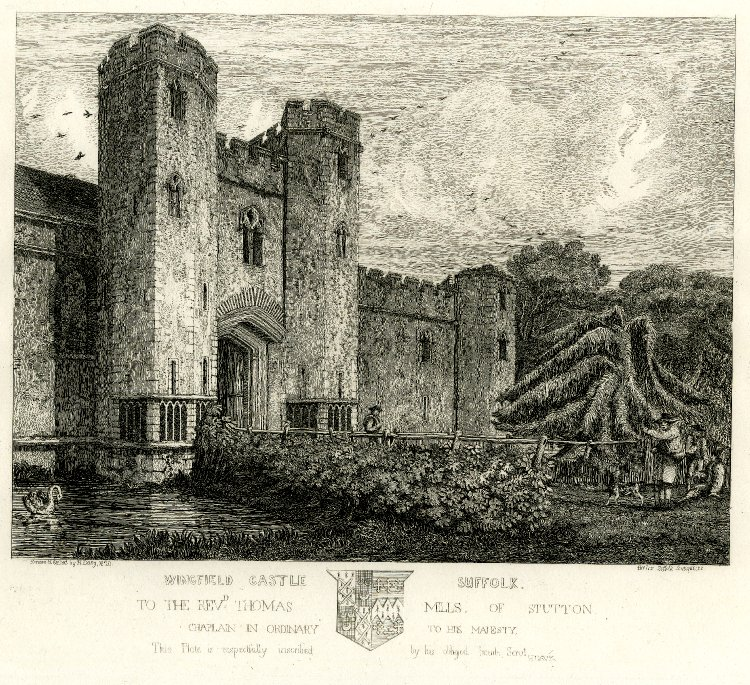
Wingfield Castle, Suffolk, by Henry Davy

== Political career ==
Catlin was elected as one of the two members for Norwich in the general election of November 1640 which formed the Long Parliament. When the English Civil War broke out in 1642, he declared for the Royalist side against the Parliamentary side and no longer attended sittings.

Due to his absence, in 1644 he was disabled for deserting the service of the House and his estate was sequestrated. However, he was discharged without fine by order of the House in 1647. In 1660, he was a signatory of the petition for a free Parliament.

== Family ==
He married first Mary (1588–1633), daughter of Sir Robert Houghton, a Justice of the King's Bench, and secondly Dorothy (1605–1672), daughter of Sir Henry Nevill of Billingbear. His eldest son by the first marriage, Thomas Catlin, died fighting for the King at the Second Battle of Newbury in 1644.

He died in 1662 and was buried in the church of All Saints at Kirby Cane. His heir was his eldest son by the second marriage, Nevill Catlin, who was knighted in 1662 and followed his father into Parliament.

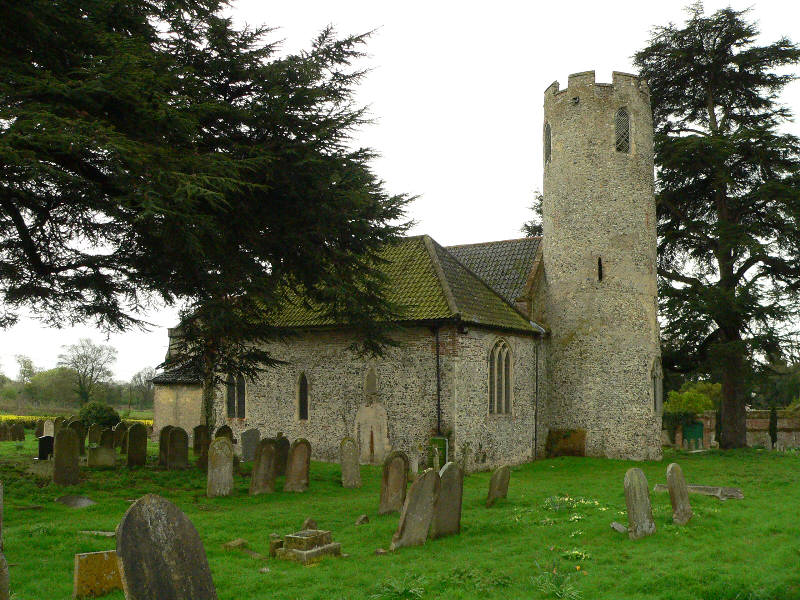
All Saints, Kirby Cane

Parliament of England
Preceded by Thomas Tooley; Thomas Atkins	Member of Parliament for Norwich; Nov 1640 – Jan 1644; With: Richard Harman	Succeeded by Richard Harman; Vacant
