= Richard Harman (politician) =

Richard Harman (c. 1621 – 1646) was an English politician who sat in the House of Commons from 1640 to 1646.

Harman was born at St Andrew's, Norwich, the son of Richard Harman, alderman, of Norwich. He was educated at Norwich School under Mr Briggs and was admitted at Sidney Sussex College, Cambridge on 28 March 1638 aged 17. He was admitted at Gray's Inn on 18 March 1640.

In November 1640, Harman was elected Member of Parliament for Norwich in the Long Parliament. He sat until his death in 1646.

Parliament of England
| Preceded by Thomas Tooley; Thomas Atkins | Member of Parliament for Norwich; 1640–1646; With: Richard Catelyn 1640–1644; Erasmus Earle 1645–1646 | Succeeded by Thomas Atkins; Erasmus Earle |
