= William Bell (apothecary) =

William Bell (died ca. 1668) was an English apothecary and politician who sat in the House of Commons from 1640 to 1648.

Bell was an apothecary of Westminster and an early member of the Society of Apothecaries. He was a church warden of St Margaret's Westminster from 1628 to 1630 and later a vestryman.

In April 1640, Bell was elected Member of Parliament for Westminster in the Short Parliament. He was re-elected MP for Westminster in November 1640 for the Long Parliament and sat until he was excluded under Pride's Purge in 1648. Bell was elected alderman for Farringdon Without ward on 12 October 1652 and remained for a year.

Bell made a will on 28 June 1664, which was proved on 23 June 1668.

Parliament of England
Parliament suspended since 1629	Member of Parliament for Westminster; 1640–1648; With: Sir John Glynne	Not represented in the Rump Parliament
