= John Lowry (Parliamentarian) =

John Lowry (died 1669) was an English politician who sat in the House of Commons from 1640 to 1653. He served in the Parliamentary army in the English Civil War.

Lowry was a chandler of Cambridge, and became a freeman of the city by apprenticeship. He became one of the Common Council of Cambridge and in November 1640, he was elected member of parliament for Cambridge in the Long Parliament, sharing the constituency with Oliver Cromwell. In the Civil War, Lowry became a colonel in the parliamentary army and in 1645 was seeking resources from the speaker of the Commons. He was then mayor of Cambridge and he came into dispute with Cambridge University when he refused to take the customary oath to maintain the rights of the university. The university appealed to the House of Lords. The matter was not resolved until 1647 when the House of Lords ruled in favour of the Vice-Chancellor and made a general order that the Mayor should respect the privileges of the university. In 1659 Lowry was re-elected MP for Cambridge in the Third Protectorate Parliament.

He was buried on the north side of the churchyard of the Church of the Holy Sepulchre, Cambridge on 18 July 1669.

Parliament of England
Preceded by Oliver Cromwell; Thomas Meautys	Member of Parliament for Cambridge; 1640–1653; With: Oliver Cromwell	Succeeded by Not represented in Barebones Parliament
Preceded by Richard Timbs	Member of Parliament for Cambridge; 1659–1660; With: Richard Timbs 1659	Succeeded by Sir Dudley North; Sir Thomas Wills, 1st Baronet
