= John Alured =

John Alured (1607–1651) was an army officer who fought for the parliamentary cause in the English Civil War and was one of the regicides of King Charles I in 1649.

He was born in Kingston upon Hull. He inherited the family estate in 1628 and married Mary Darley (second cousin) in 1631.

Alured was the MP for Hedon in both the Short and Long Parliaments. He spent most of the First Civil War as a colonel in Lord Fairfax's northern parliamentarian army, and is known to have fought at Adwalton Moor in 1643 and possibly at Marston Moor in 1644. He was a member of Philip Nye's Hull congregation. In February 1645 he took up a new command in the New Model Army. In 1649, appointed to the High Court of Justice at the trial of King Charles, he was one of the signatories of the King's death warrant.

At the restoration of the monarchy in 1660, because of his act of regicide he was, although by then dead, a named exception in the general pardon (Act of Oblivion, section XXXVIII), which meant that any property that was held by the beneficiaries of his estate could be confiscated.
