= Rump Parliament =

English parliament 1648–1653

The Rump Parliament was what remained of the Long Parliament after Pride's Purge on 6 December 1648, when Colonel Thomas Pride commanded his soldiers to exclude from the House of Commons those members who were against the Grandees' intention to try King Charles I for high treason. The Rump was dissolved by Oliver Cromwell in 1653 and replaced by the Barebone's Parliament. After Richard Cromwell's removal from power in 1659, the Rump was briefly reinstated.

"Rump" normally means the hind end or backside of a mammal; its use meaning "remnant" (the reduced-membership Parliament) was first recorded in the above context in English in 1649. (Note: Described in 1649 as "This fagge end, this Rump of a Parliament with corrupt Maggots in it".)

== Treaty of Newport ==
In September 1648, at the end of the Second English Civil War, the Long Parliament was concerned with the increasing radicalism in the New Model Army. The Long Parliament began negotiations with King Charles I. The members wanted to restore the king to power, but wanted to limit the authority he had. Charles I conceded militia power, among other things, but he later admitted that it was only so he could escape. In November the negotiations began to fail, and the New Model Army seized power. Charles I was then taken into the Army's custody to await trial for treason.

== Pride's Purge ==
The New Model Army wanted to prevent Parliament from agreeing on the Treaty of Newport to reinstate King Charles I. While Presbyterian and moderate elements within Parliament were inclined to continue negotiations, the Army was impatient with Charles. Thomas Fairfax, by issuing a command to Commissary General Ireton, organized a military coup in 1648. Ireton intended to dissolve the Long Parliament but was persuaded to purge it instead. He then ordered Colonel Thomas Pride to prevent the signing of the Treaty of Newport.

Between 6 and 12 December, Pride—supported by two regiments—prevented 231 known supporters of the treaty from entering the House, imprisoning 45 for a few days. The remaining free members then became the Rump Parliament.

== Execution of Charles I and abolition of the monarchy ==
When it became apparent to the leaders of the New Model Army that Parliament—then controlled by the Presbyterian faction—was ready to come to an agreement with the King that would restore him to the throne (though without effective power) and negate the power of the Army, they resolved to shatter the power of both King and Parliament. Pride's Purge brought Parliament to heel under the direct control of the Army; the remaining Commons (the Rump) then on 13 December 1648, broke off negotiations with the King. Two days later, the Council of Officers of the New Model Army voted that the King be moved from the Isle of Wight, where he was prisoner, to Windsor, "in order to the bringing of him speedily to justice". The King was brought from Windsor to London in the middle of December.

On 4 January 1649, the House of Commons passed an ordinance to set up a High Court of Justice, to try Charles I for high treason in the name of the people of England. The House of Lords rejected it, and as it did not receive royal assent, Charles asked at the start of his trial on 20 January in Westminster Hall, "I would know by what power I am called hither. I would know by what authority, I mean lawful authority", knowing that there was no legal answer under the constitutional arrangements of the time. He was convicted with fifty-nine commissioners (judges), many of them members of the Rump Parliament (including Oliver Cromwell), signing the death warrant.

The execution of Charles I was stayed until 30 January, so that the House of Commons could pass an emergency act, the "Act prohibiting the proclaiming any person to be King of England or Ireland, or the Dominions thereof", that made it an offence to proclaim a new King, and to declare the representatives of the people, the House of Commons, as the source of all just power. The Commons voted to abolish the House of Lords on 6 February and to abolish the monarchy on 7 February; an act abolishing the kingship was formally passed by the Rump on 17 March, followed by an act to abolish the House of Lords on 19 March. The establishment of a Council of State was approved on 14 February, and on 19 May an Act Declaring England a Commonwealth was passed. The Treasons Act made it an offence to say that the House of Commons (without the Lords or the King) was not the supreme authority of the land.

== Membership, attendance, and allegiances ==
Although an exact number is unknown, it is estimated that there were about 210 members of the Rump Parliament, or less than half the membership of the Long Parliament (470 members) before Pride's Purge. Though nine new members were admitted to the Rump Parliament, the vast majority were transferred from the Long Parliament.

Most of the membership continued to regard purged colleagues as members of parliament and remained hopeful that the excluded members would be readmitted. "The Rump did not think of itself as a corporate political entity distinct in membership, aims and character from the Long Parliament". There were a variety of reasons why people wanted to be a part of the Rump Parliament. Some members stayed in the Rump Parliament because they supported the revolutionary changes afoot, while others were there for financial advantage, civilian power, or to satisfy their relish for political activity.

Because of the varied energies within the Rump, the parliament divided into two categories, front benchers and back benchers, meaning respectively those who attended parliament regularly and those who did not. Only about one-third of the Rump Parliament became front benchers while the other two-thirds were back benchers. Within the active third of the Rump, there were many family allegiances, local allegiances and most importantly, common interest groups. The majority of active rumpers could fit into one of the two common interest categories:

1. Members of Parliament who were professional lawyers and cooperated to oppose the reformation of the English legal system. Some of the best-known lawyer allies were Bulstrode Whitelocke, Sir Thomas Widdrington, Nicholas Lechmere and Lisliborne Long.
2. Members who were particularly concerned with commercial matters and politics in the City of London. Three remarkable pairs of allies in this category are Jon Venn and Miles Corbet, Isaac Pennington and Thomas Atkin, and Frances Allen and Richard Salwey.

Although lawyers and merchants were a minority compared to the large number of rural land lords that occupied the Rump Parliament, their interest groups' energy and cohesiveness was able to largely influence Rump politics.

== Political changes ==
During the time of the Commonwealth of England (1649–1653), the Rump passed a number of acts in the areas of religion, law, and finance, as well as in commercial and colonial policy. Most of the members of the Rump wanted to promote "godliness", but also to restrict the more extreme puritan sects like the Quakers and the Ranters. An Adultery Act of May 1650 imposed the death penalty for incest and adultery and three months imprisonment for fornication; the Blasphemy Act of August 1650 was aimed at curbing extreme religious "enthusiasm". To stop extreme evangelicals from preaching, they formed a Committee for the Propagation of the Gospel, which issued licenses to preach. To allow Puritans freedom of worship, they repealed the Elizabethan requirement of compulsory attendance at an Anglican Church. As lawyers were overrepresented in the Rump Parliament, the Rump did not respond to the popular requests made by the Levellers to change the expensive legal system.

The Rump raised revenue through the sale of Crown lands and Church property, both of which were popular. Revenue raised through excise levies and through an Assessment Tax on land were unpopular as they affected everyone who owned property. The proceeds from confiscated Royalist estates were a valuable source of income, but it was a double-edged sword. It ingratiated Parliament to people like John Downes who were making a fortune from the business but it did nothing to heal the wounds of the Civil War.

Three acts of the parliament in 1650 and 1651 are notable in the historical development of England's commercial and colonial programs. These include the first Commission of Trade to be established by an Act of Parliament on 1 August 1650. The instructions to the named commissioners included consideration of both domestic and foreign trade, the trading companies, manufactures, free ports, customs, excise, statistics, coinage and exchange, and fisheries, but also the plantations and the best means of promoting their welfare and rendering them useful to England. This act's statesmanlike and comprehensive instructions, along with an October act prohibiting trade with pro-royalist colonies and the first Navigation Act of October 1651, formed the first definitive expression of England's commercial policy. They represent the first attempt to establish a legitimate control of commercial and colonial affairs, and the instructions indicate the beginnings of a policy which had the prosperity and wealth of England exclusively at heart.

== Oliver Cromwell ==
In 1653, after learning that Parliament was attempting to stay in session despite an agreement to dissolve, and having failed to come up with a working constitution, Cromwell's patience ran out. On 20 April he attended a sitting of Parliament and listened to one or two speeches. Then he stood up and harangued the members of the Rump. This speech does not survive, but has often been paraphrased, for instance in the Book of Days: "You have sat too long for any good you have been doing lately ... Depart, I say; and let us have done with you. In the name of God, go!" He then declared "you are no Parliament" and called in a troop of soldiers, under the command of Major-General Thomas Harrison, ordering them to clear the chamber. According to Charles Dickens in A Child's History of England and Hilaire Belloc, he then turned to the Speaker's Mace, the symbol of parliamentary power, declared it a "fool's bauble", and ordered the troops "here, carry it away". Cromwell's motives are uncertain, but may lie in his disapproval of Sir Henry Vane's scheme for a redistribution of constituencies that retained sitting members of Parliament and continued to fill vacancies with recruiter elections.

A more detailed record of the event is recounted by Thomas Salmon in his Chronological Historian (London, 1723, 106):

[Cromwell] commanded the Speaker to leave the Chair, and told them they had sat long enough, unless they had done more good, crying out "You are no longer a Parliament, I say you are no Parliament". He told Sir Henry Vane he was a Jugler [sic]; Henry Martin and Sir Peter Wentworth, that they were Whoremasters; Thomas Chaloner, he was a Drunkard; and Allen the Goldsmith that he cheated the Publick: Then he bid one of his Soldiers take away that Fool's Bauble the mace and Thomas Harrison pulled the Speaker of the Chair; and in short Cromwell having turned them all out of the House, lock'd up the Doors and returned to Whitehall.

Salmon does not cite his own sources but the version is sufficiently detailed to suggest that he had access to descriptions of the event that were certainly current in his time, and were probably derived from eye-witness descriptions. It is therefore probably at least accurate in general tone, if not precise detail.

Within a month of the Rump's dismissal, Oliver Cromwell on the advice of Harrison and with the support of other officers in the Army, sent a request to Congregational churches in every county to nominate those they considered fit to take part in the new government. On 4 July, a Nominated Assembly, nicknamed the "Assembly of Saints" or Barebone's Parliament (named after one of its members), took on the role of more traditional English parliaments.

== Restoration, 1659–1660 ==
Richard Cromwell, the third (and eldest surviving) son of Oliver Cromwell, was appointed Lord Protector after his father's death. He called the Third Protectorate Parliament in 1659. Along with the Army, it was unable to form a stable government. After seven months, the Army removed Cromwell; on 6 May 1659, it reinstalled the Rump Parliament. The Rump Parliament issued a declaration establishing a "Commonwealth without a king, single person, or house of lords".

According to Edmond Ludlow:

on May 7, about twelve o-clock we went to take our places in the House, Mr. Lenthal our Speaker leading the way, and the officers of the army lining the rooms for us, as we passed through the Painted Chamber, the Court of Requests, and the lobby itself, the principal officers having placed themselves nearest to the door of the Parliament-House, every one seeming to rejoice at our restitution, and promising to live and die with us. The same day the House appointed a Committee of Safety, with authority to seize and secure such as might justly be suspected of any design to disturb the public peace, and also to remove such officers of the army as they should think fit, and to fill their places with others, till the Parliament should take farther order therein. The persons constituted to be of that committee were Sir Henry Vane the Younger, Sir Arthur Haselrig, Lieutenant-General Fleetwood, Col. Sydenham, Major Saloway, Col. John Jones, and Edmond Ludlow. These were of the House, and to them were joined from without Major-General Lambert, Col. Desborough, and Col. Berry.

On 14 May:

the Parliament proceeded to the election of twenty one of their members to be the Council of State, according to their former resolution, and chose Sir Arthur Haselrig, Sir Henry Vane the Younger, Lieut.-Gen. Fleetwood, Major Saloway, Col. Morley, Mr. Thomas Chaloner, Col. Algernon Sidney, Mr. Hernry Nevil, Col. Walton, Col. Dixwel, Mr. Wallop, Chief Justice St. Johns, Mr. Thomas Scott, Col. Thomson, Mr. Robert Reynolds, Col. Sydenham, Col. John Jones, the Lord Commissioner Whitlock, Sir. James Harrington, Col. Downes, and Edmond Ludlow. Then to complete the number of ten, who were to consist of persons that were not members they chose the Lord Warriston, Sir. Robert Honywood, and Mr. Joaias Berns. The officers of the army were not at all pleased with this election, perceiving they should not be permitted to act arbitrarily, as they desired, and therefore seldom came to the council; and when they condescended to come, carried themselves with all imaginable perverseness and insolence… These men all took an oath to be true and faithful to the Commonwealth, in opposition to Charles Stuart, or any single person, which the Parliament had appointed to be taken by every member of the council before he took his place, excepting Lieut. General Fleetwood and Col. Syndenham were excused from the formality of the oath upon acceptance of the obligations. A committee of examination and secrecy, whom this council entrusted with great powers was also formed consisting of Lieut. General Fleetwood, Henry Vane the Younger], Major-General Lambert, Major Salloway, Mr. Scott, Serjeant Bradshaw, and Edmond Ludlow. Lieut. Gen. Fleetwood continued to press for 1. indemnification by act of Parliament, 2, to be made Commander-in-Chief of the army, 3. absolution of the debts of the Protector, 4. ten thousand pounds by year added to his revenue, and 5. the appointment of a select senate designated by the army, and 6. that liberty of conscience might be secured to all such who professed faith in Jesus Christ and were not scandalous in their conversation. The Parliament refused to grant these requests so that in the "future no man might have an opportunity to pack an army to serve his ambition as had formerly been practiced." On July 4, 1659 Parliament prepared and brought in a bill constituting Lieut. Gen Fleetwood, Sir Arthur Haselrig, Major General Lambert, Col. Desborough, Col. Berry, Sir. Henry Vane, and Edmond Ludlow to be Commissioners for the nomination of officers to be presented to the consideration and approbation of the Parliament. Lieut. Gen Fleetwood was made provisionally commander and chief, but all commissions must be appointed by Parliament. On July 18, Edmond Ludlow was appointed Commander-in-Chief of all the forces in Ireland, and made Lieut. Gen of the Horse.

After a few months, divisions in the Commonwealth were settled by force of arms. On 12 October the Rump voted to declare the seven commissioners' responsibility for the Army void and appointed Charles Fleetwood commander-in-chief under the Speaker of the House. The next day on 13 October 1659 the Army in London under the command of John Lambert assisted by Charles Fleetwood excluded the Rump from Parliament by locking the doors to the Palace of Westminster and stationing armed guards outside. Lambert and Fleetwood created a 23 member Committee of Safety to govern the country in place of the Rump with General Fleetwood and Lambert directly under him, commander of the Army in England and Scotland.

Sir Arthur Haselrig appealed to other Army generals to support the Rump against Fleetwood and Lambert. Fearing anarchy because of the conflict within Parliament and the general anger at the decisions the Rump had made, General George Monck, commander-in-chief of the English army in Scotland, declared that he was ready to uphold Parliament's authority and marched at the head of his army to London, holding true to a statement in his book, Observations Upon Military and Political Affairs in which he said he valued the stability of his nation and the power of Parliament over his own life.

Monck was also in a particularly powerful position because of his former relationship with and endorsement from Oliver Cromwell. Many imbued him with the power to affect who the next king would be. Lambert marched north against Monck in November 1659. Lambert's army began to melt away, and he was kept in suspense by Monck till his whole army deserted and he returned to London almost alone. On 24 December 1659, the chastened Fleetwood approached the Speaker, William Lenthal, asking him to recall the Rump. The same day Lenthal took possession of the Tower and appointed commissioners for its government. The Rump met again on 26 December 1659. Parliament declared Monck commander-in-chief in England as well as Scotland.

Monck marched into England in January 1660, as Lambert's supporters in the Army were cashiered and his authority crumbled. When Sir Thomas Fairfax emerged from retirement to declare his support for Monck, Army support for Monck became almost unanimous. Monck entered London in February 1660 and he allowed the Presbyterian members, 'secluded' in Pride's Purge of 1648, to re-enter parliament on 21 February 1660 on the condition that the restored Long Parliament would agree to dissolve themselves once general elections had been held. The Long Parliament dissolved itself on 16 March 1660, after preparing legislation for the Convention Parliament that formally invited King Charles II to be the English monarch in what has become known as the Restoration (of the House of Stuart).

== See also ==
- Regicide
- Rump state – Reduced territory of a once-larger state
- List of parliaments of England
- List of MPs not excluded from the English parliament in 1648
- List of ordinances and acts of the Parliament of England, 1642–1660
