= John Crowley (1689–1728) =

British politician

John Crowley (3 November 1689 – 1728) of Barking, Suffolk, was a British politician who sat in the House of Commons from 1722 to 1728.

Crowley was the son of Sir Ambrose Crowley, MP and his wife Mary Owen, daughter of Charles Owen of London. He succeeded his father in 1713 and inherited the Crowley Iron Works in Durham, probably the biggest in the country. He married by a settlement dated 7 December 1715, Theodosia Gascoyne, daughter of Rev. Joseph Gascoyne of Enfield, Middlesex and Barking, Suffolk. One of his sisters married Humphrey Parsons, another Sir John Hynde Cotton, 3rd Baronet. In September 1715 he was arrested on suspicion of being an active Jacobite, but he was soon released. During the Gyllenborg plot in 1716 and 1717, he was said to have offered £20,000 for the Pretender's service.

Crowley was a Freeman of the Draper's Company, and was a Common Councillor for. Dowgate, London from 1721 to 1727. He was regarded as one of the London Jacobites, and was returned as Member of Parliament for Okehampton at the 1722 British general election. He spoke against a motion for increasing the army on 26 October 1722. In 1723 he stood unsuccessfully for Alderman for Billingsgate. At the 1727 he was returned as MP for Queenborough but was unsuccessful in a contest at Ipswich. He was elected Alderman for Dowgate on 28 September 1727.

Crowley died on 2 January 1728, leaving £70,000 to be divided between his children comprising two sons and four daughters. His daughter Elizabeth married John Ashburnham, 2nd Earl of Ashburnham.

Parliament of Great Britain
Preceded by William Northmore; Christopher Harris	Member of Parliament for Okehampton; 1722–1727; With: Robert Pitt	Succeeded by William Northmore; Thomas Pitt
Preceded by Captain Lord Forbes; Lieutenant Colonel John Cope	Member of Parliament for Queenborough; 1727– 1728; With: Sprig Manesty	Succeeded by Sprig Manesty; Captain Sir George Saunders
