= Sir Edward Hales, 1st Baronet =

English politician (1576–1654)

Sir Edward Hales, 1st Baronet (1576–1654) was an English politician who sat in the House of Commons in various years between 1605 and 1648. He supported the Parliamentarian side in the English Civil War.

== Family ==
Edward Hales was the son of William Hales of Tenterden, Kent and Elizabeth Johnson, daughter of Paul Johnson of Fordwich. His paternal grandfather was Edward Hales, third son of John Hales (1469/70 – c. 1540), Baron of the Exchequer, and younger brother of Sir James Hales (c. 1500–1554), Justice of the Common Pleas, whose suicide, the subject of a lawsuit in Hales v. Petit, is thought to be alluded to in the gravedigger's speech in Shakespeare's play, Hamlet.

== Career ==
Hales was elected MP for Hastings in 1605 and 1614, and appointed High Sheriff of Kent for 1608–1609 and was created a baronet by King James I on 29 June 1611.

In 1625, Hales was elected Member of Parliament for Queenborough for one parliament, and then in 1626 was elected MP for Kent for one parliament. In April 1640 he was re-elected MP for Queenborough for the Short Parliament. He was elected again in November 1640 for the Long Parliament, and held the seat until 1648 when he was excluded under Pride's Purge.

Hales died in 1654 at the age of 78.

== Marriages and issue ==
Hales married firstly Deborah Harlakenden, daughter of Martin Harlakenden of Woodchurch, Kent, and through her acquired the Woodchurch estates. He married secondly Martha Cromer, daughter of Sir Matthew Carew, and widow of Sir James Cromer of Tunstall, Kent, and through her acquired the Tunstall estates. She also inherited the manor of 'Herst Hall' in Murston.

His children by his first wife included a son, Sir John Hales, who pre-deceased him. He was then succeeded by his grandson Sir Edward Hales, 2nd Baronet. The latter was a Royalist and supporter of King Charles I, who attempted to raise an army for the King in Kent and was involved in an attempt to free the King when he was imprisoned at Carisbrooke Castle. Having incurred the wrath of both Parliament and his grandfather, the future second baronet fled to the Netherlands.

== Footnotes ==
Parliament of England
Preceded by Roger Palmer; Robert Poley	Member of Parliament for Queenborough; 1625; With: Roger Palmer	Succeeded by Roger Palmer; Robert Poley
Preceded by Mildmay Lord Buckhurst; Sir Albertus Moreton	Member of Parliament for Kent; 1626; With: Sir Edward Scott	Succeeded by Sir Thomas Finch; Sir Dudley Diggs
Vacant Parliament suspended since 1629	Member of Parliament for Queenborough; 1640–1648; With: John Wolstenholme April 1640 – November 1640; William Harrison November 1640 – 1643; Sir Michael Livesey 1643–1648	Succeeded by Augustine Garland; Sir Michael Livesey
Baronetage of England
New creation	Baronet (of Woodchurch and Tunstall); 1626–1654	Succeeded by Edward Hales
