= Edward Hales =

Edward Hales may refer to:

- Sir Edward Hales, 1st Baronet (1576–1654), English politician, MP for Queenborough and Kent
- Sir Edward Hales, 2nd Baronet (1626–1684), Member of Parliament (MP) for Maidstone and Queenborough
- Edward Hales (MP for Hythe) (1630–1696), MP for Hythe
- Sir Edward Hales, 3rd Baronet (1645–1695), MP for Canterbury, 1679–1681
- Sir Edward Hales, 5th Baronet, 3rd Jacobite Earl of Tenterden (1730–1802), of the Hales baronets
- Sir Edward Hales, 6th Baronet, 4th Jacobite Earl of Tenterden (1758–1829), of the Hales baronets
- E. E. Y. Hales (Edward Elton Young Hales, 1908–1986), English historian
