= Earl of Castlemaine =

Title in the Peerage of Ireland

Earldom of Castlemaine
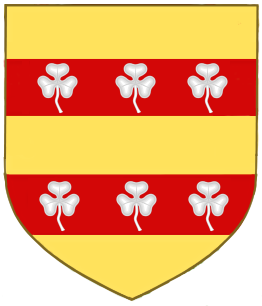
- Arms of Palmer, Earl of Castlemaine: Or, two bars Gules, each charged with three trefoils Argent
- Creation date: 7 December 1661
- Created by: Charles II
- Peerage: Peerage of Ireland
- First holder: Roger Palmer
- Remainder to: the 1st Earl's heirs male of the body lawfully begotten.
- Subsidiary titles: Baron Limerick
- Extinction date: 21 July 1705
- Former seat: Dorney Court
- Motto: Palma Virtuti (Latin: "The palm is for virtue")

The Earldom of Castlemaine was a title created in the Peerage of Ireland. It was created for Roger Palmer, the son of Sir James Palmer, a Gentleman of the Bedchamber under King Charles I, and Catherine Herbert, daughter of William Herbert, 1st Baron Powis. Roger Palmer was also the husband of Barbara Palmer (née Villiers), mistress to King Charles II. The Earl was also given the title Baron Limerick. The earldom was named after Castle Maine in County Kerry.

The title was limited to his male heirs by Barbara (i.e. as opposed, that is, to any later wife he might have), making it clear that the earldom was not for Palmer's services to the King, but for his wife's. As the only child officially fathered by Lord Castlemaine (which probably was not actually his) was female, the title became extinct on his death.

The seat of the Palmer family is Dorney Court, Dorney, Buckinghamshire.

== Earls of Castlemaine, First Creation (1661) ==
- Roger Palmer, 1st Earl of Castlemaine (1634–1705)

== Full arms of Roger Palmer, 1st Earl of Castlemaine ==
Coat of arms of Earl of Castlemaine
Coronet A Coronet of an Earl Crest A demi-panther rampant issuing flames out of its mouth and ears, holding in its paws a holly branch, with leaves and berries all proper. Escutcheon Or, two bars Gules, each charged with three trefoils Argent. Supporters Two lions guardant Argent. Motto Palma Virtuti (Latin: "The palm is for virtue")

== See also ==
- List of earldoms
- Viscount Castlemaine
- Baron Castlemaine
