= Sir Edward Hales, 2nd Baronet =

English politician

Sir Edward Hales, 2nd Baronet (1626 – c. 1684) was an English politician who sat in the House of Commons from 1660 to 1681.

Hales was the son of Sir John Hales and his wife Christian Cromer, daughter of Sir James Cromer, of Tunstall and grandson of Sir Edward Hales, 1st Baronet. He matriculated at Magdalen College, Oxford on 20 May 1642, aged 16. He was a devoted Royalist, and risked his life trying to rescue Charles I from his imprisonment at Carisbrooke. His father predeceased him, in 1639, and he succeeded to the baronetcy on the death of his grandfather in September 1654.

In August 1660, Hales was elected at a by-election as Member of Parliament for Maidstone in the Convention Parliament. He was elected MP for Queenborough in 1661 for the Cavalier Parliament and was re-elected for Queenborough in 1679 for the two exclusion parliaments.

Hales died in France between August 1683 and February 1684.

Hales married Anne Wootton, the youngest of the four daughters of Thomas Wotton, 2nd Baron Wotton of Marlby and his wife Mary Throckmorton. His only son Edward succeeded to the baronetcy. Although Edward Hasted records that Edward was the eldest of four sons. and evidence of the birth of a second and third son, John Hales, bap. 1647 & Thomas Hales bap. Dec 1652 can be found in the registers at St John the Baptist, Tunstall.

Parliament of England
Preceded by Thomas Twisden; Robert Barnham	Member of Parliament for Maidstone; 1660; With: Robert Barnham	Succeeded by Robert Barnham; Sir Edmund Pierce
Preceded by Sir William Wheler; Hon. James Herbert	Member of Parliament for Queenborough; 1661–1681; With: Hon. James Herbert; James Herbert	Succeeded by William Glanville; Gerard Gore
Baronetage of England
Preceded by Edward Hales	Baronet (of Woodchurch and Tunstall); 1654–1684	Succeeded by Edward Hales
