= Michael Livesey =

17th-century English Puritan activist and politician

Sir Michael Livesey JP
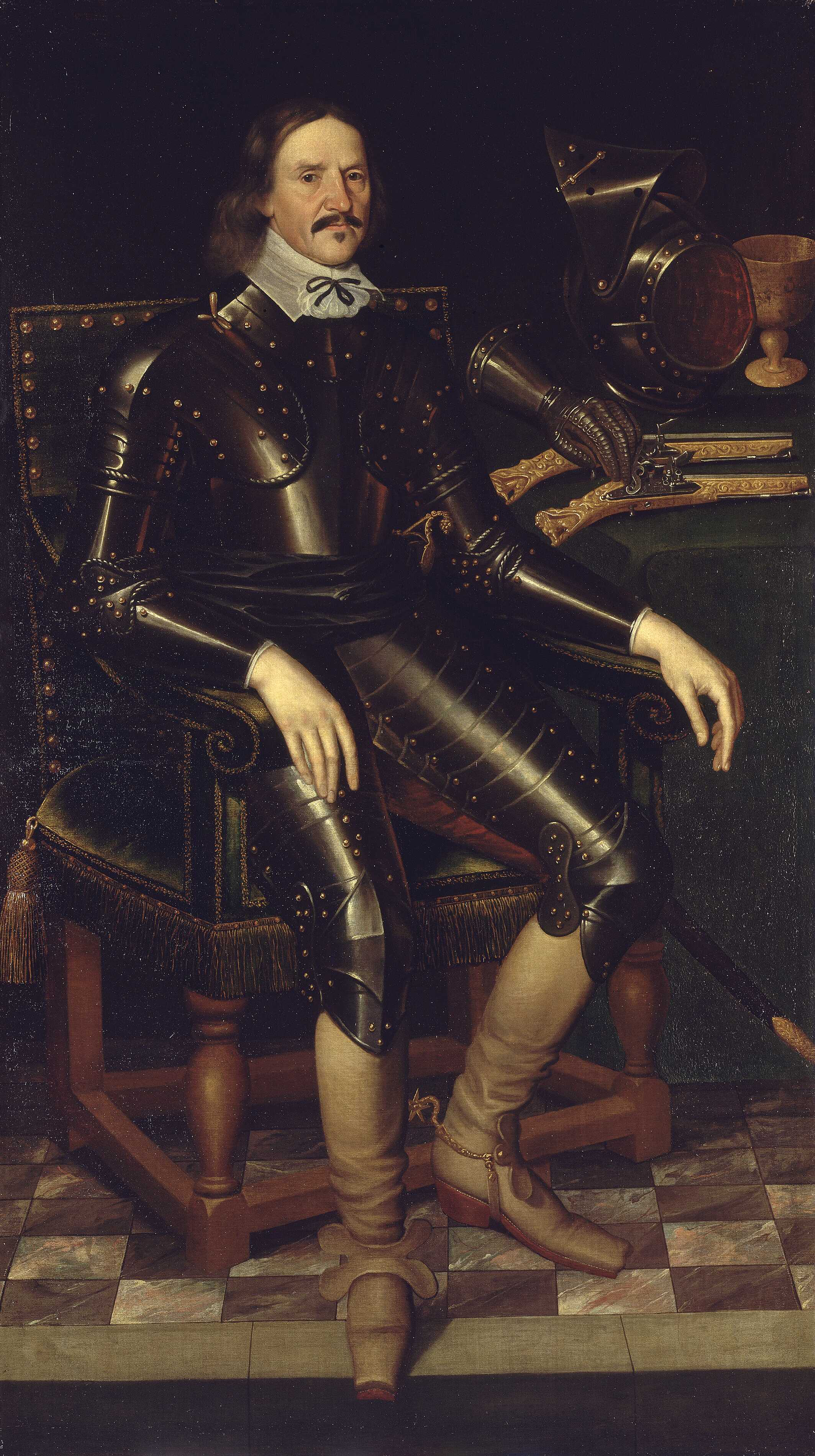
- Sir Michael Livesey

High Sheriff of Kent
- In office 1655–1657

Member of Parliament for Queenborough
- In office September 1645 – April 1653

Personal details
- Born: 1614 Eastchurch, Kent
- Died: 1665 (aged 50–51) Rotterdam, Dutch Republic
- Spouse: Elizabeth (?-1665)
- Children: Anne; Deborah (1634-?)
- Occupation: Landowner, soldier, and Puritan activist

Military service
- Rank: Colonel
- Battles/wars: Wars of the Three Kingdoms; Siege of Chichester; Bramber Bridge; Cheriton; Copredy Bridge; Skirmish at Surbiton

Sir Michael Livesey, 1st Baronet (1614 - circa 1665), also spelt Livesay, was a Puritan activist and Member of Parliament who served in the Parliamentarian army during the Wars of the Three Kingdoms. He was one of the regicides who approved the Execution of Charles I in January 1649.

At the outbreak of the First English Civil War in August 1642, Livesey played a prominent role in securing Kent for Parliament, raising a regiment of cavalry and serving on the local administration. He resigned his commission in early 1645 and was appointed Member of Parliament (MP) for Queenborough in September. During the Second English Civil War in 1648, he once again displayed energy and commitment in suppressing Royalist risings in South East England.

Known as a Republican who opposed further negotiations with King Charles I, Livesey was one of the MPs retained after Pride's Purge in December 1648, and appointed a judge at Charles' trial. A strong believer in the sovereignty of Parliament, he became disillusioned after the establishment of the Protectorate in 1654, although he served as High Sheriff of Kent in 1655 and 1656.

Following the Stuart Restoration in 1660, he was condemned as a regicide and escaped to the Low Countries. Claims he was assassinated by Royalist agents shortly afterwards are incorrect; he appears to have died in Rotterdam around June 1665, although some biographies give an earlier date.

== Personal details ==
Michael Livesey was the only surviving son of Gabriel Livesey (1567–1622) and his second wife Anne, daughter of Sir Michael Sondes, MP for Queenborough and High Sheriff of Kent. His paternal grandfather Robert was Sheriff of Sussex and Surrey in 1602 and 1603, who purchased estates in Kent at Hollingbourne Hill and Eastchurch in 1571. These were transferred to Gabriel, who was Sheriff of Kent in 1618, making the family a leading part of the county gentry.

After Gabriel's death in 1622, Anne married her cousin Sir John Hayward (1591–1636), who sold his property in Shropshire and bought Hollingbourne. Hayward also served as Sheriff of Kent in 1623, an unusual move since such offices were normally held by an established member of the local community. He and his step-son do not appear to have been close; in 1632, Livesey unsuccessfully tried to recover Hollingbourne 'through a trick of law', rather than paying for it, and Sir John's will left it to a distant relative.

Livesey's marriage to Elizabeth Clinton-Fiennes (died 1666) produced two daughters, Deborah and Anne (1634–?), who later married Sir Robert Sprignell (1622–1688). His baronetcy was confiscated in 1660.

== Career ==
Details on Livesey's life prior to 1640 are limited, other than the purchase of a baronetcy in 1627 and his appointment as Justice of the Peace in 1637. Known as a devout Puritan (Note: "Puritan" was a general term for those who wanted to "purify" the Church of England of alleged Catholic practices; it covered a wide range of religious and political views, including some who later became Royalists.) his marriage connected him to Theophilus Clinton, 4th Earl of Lincoln and William Fiennes, 1st Viscount Saye and Sele, both leading opponents of Charles I. In February 1642, he organised and presented a petition to the Long Parliament on behalf of 'the Knights, Gentry and Commonalty of the County of Kent', which expressed support for the reforms carried out since November 1640.

Kent; key locations

When the First English Civil War began in August 1642, most of Kent supported Parliament and Livesey raised a regiment of local cavalry. His unit seized control of Rochester and Canterbury, although Livesey was forced to apologise for the damage they caused to the Cathedral. As part of the Army of the Southern Association commanded by Sir William Waller, he participated in the capture of Chichester in December 1642. He was also a member of the Kent County Committee which administered civil affairs, although he fell out with the more moderate members, allegedly due to the extremity of his views.

In late 1643, a Royalist army under Sir Ralph Hopton marched into Hampshire and Sussex, whose iron foundries were Parliament's main source of armaments. In late November, Livesey and 120 cavalry linked up with Waller at Farnham, where the Parliamentarian forces had concentrated to resist Hopton's advance. He missed the Battle of Alton on 13 December preventing an attack on Bramber, which controlled the road into East Sussex and Kent, important for its wealth and access to ports in Northern Europe. The furthest point reached by the Royalists, by January 1644 they had been forced back into Hampshire.

Livesey rejoined Waller and fought at Cheriton in March 1644 and Cropredy Bridge in June. A recurring problem for both sides was the reluctance of regiments to serve outside their home areas and many of Waller's men now deserted, including some in Livesey's unit. This led to accusations of cowardice and mutiny from his subordinate, Major Anthony Weldon, (Note: A younger son of Sir Anthony Weldon, chairman of the Kent Committee, who also had a reputation for quarrelling with his colleagues) who had made similar accusations against his superiors when serving in Lincolnshire. Livesey was absolved by the Committee for Both Kingdoms but resigned his commission when his regiment was transferred to the New Model Army in early 1645.

In September 1645, Livesey replaced the Royalist William Harrison as MP for Queenborough. After the war ended in May 1646, he opposed negotiations with Charles and supported the Army Council in its clash with Parliamentarian moderates led by Denzil Holles. When pro-Royalist riots broke out in Kent in December 1647, Livesey was sent to quell them; he remained in South East England when the Second English Civil War began in April 1648, suppressing unrest in Sussex and supporting Sir Thomas Fairfax in the campaign which ended with the capture of Maidstone in June.

Despite this victory, Kent remained an area of concern, particularly after nine warships of the Parliamentary-controlled Royal Navy joined the Prince of Wales in Holland. On 4 July, a petition was presented to Parliament demanding the resumption of negotiations with Charles, and on the same day, the Earl of Holland raised 400 cavalry in an attempt to seize London. This was insufficient for the task and the Royalists retreated through Surrey, before they were intercepted and scattered outside Surbiton by a force led by Livesey. On 27 July, Fairfax reported his capture at Sandwich of one of the ships which had defected.

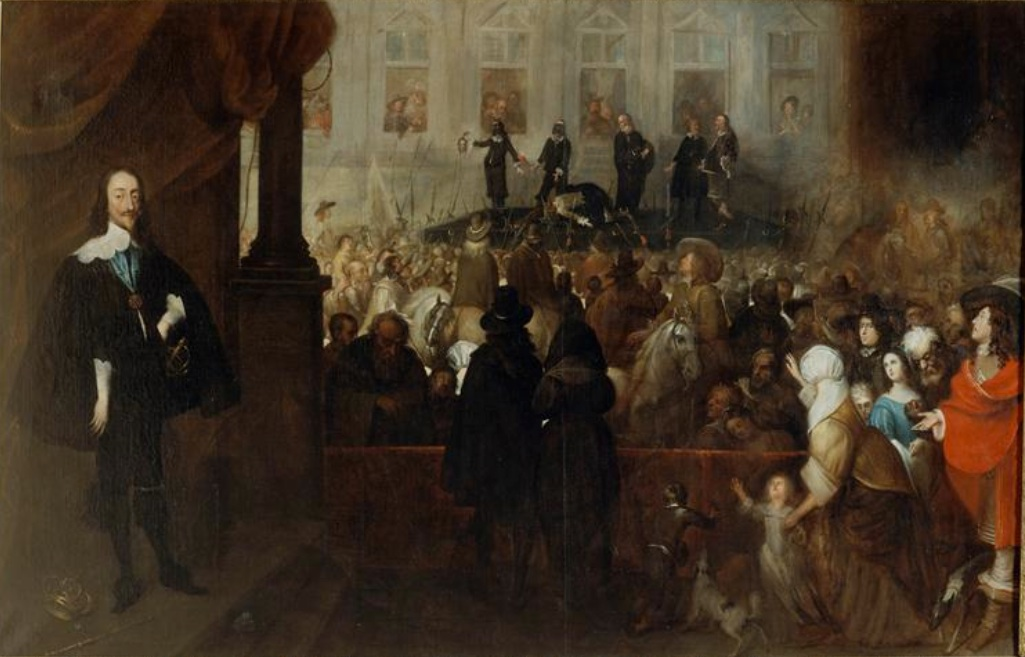
The Execution of Charles I; Livesey signed his death warrant

The main Royalist army was defeated at Preston on 17 August, but the revolt in Kent ended only after Deal and Sandown Castle surrendered in September. The Second Civil War was fought with greater bitterness than the first, with both sides executing prisoners, while it convinced Livesey, Oliver Cromwell and others that further talks with Charles were pointless. After MPs who supported continuing negotiations were excluded by Pride's Purge in December, Livesey was included in the reduced body known as the Rump Parliament. Appointed to the High Court of Justice for the trial of Charles I, he signed the death warrant for his execution on 30 January 1649.

Over the next few years, Livesey became disillusioned as Parliament's powers were first delegated to the English Council of State, before being dissolved and replaced by the Protectorate in 1654. He confined himself to local politics, serving as High Sheriff of Kent in 1655 and 1656 and when the Rump was reinstated in May 1659, he supported the civilian faction in Parliament against the Army's Wallingford House party. After Charles II was restored to the throne in May 1660, Livesey and his wife fled to the Low Countries. Claims that he was assassinated by Royalist agents are incorrect; he appears to have died in Rotterdam around June 1665, although some biographies give this as 1663.

== Sources ==
- Anonymous (1904). The Civil War in Hampshire. Privately published.
- Ashton, Robert (1994). Counter-revolution: The Second Civil War and Its Origins, 1646–8. The Bath Press. ISBN 978-0300061147.
- "Sir Michael Livesey's Regiment of Horse". BCW Project.
- Burke, John; Burke, Bernard (1844). A Genealogical and Heraldic History of the Extinct and Dormant Baronetcies of England, Ireland and Scotland. John Russ Smith.
- Fairfax, Thomas (1648). Prince Charleses ship taken by Sir Michael Livesey. Captaine Green taken prisoner.
- Firth, Charles Harding (1899). "Weldon, Anthony" . In Lee, Sidney (ed.). Dictionary of National Biography. Vol. 60. London: Smith, Elder & Co.
- Hardacre, Paul (1956). The Royalists during the Puritan Revolution. Springer. ISBN 978-9401745635.
- Hasted, Edward (1798). The History and Topographical Survey of the County of Kent: Volume 6. Bristow.
- Herman, Peter (2011). A Short History of Early Modern England. Wiley-Blackwell. ISBN 978-1405195607.
- "Die Lunæ, 18 Septembris, 1643: Major Welden". Journal of the House of Commons. Vol. 3, 1643–1644. 1802.
- Hunneyball, Paul (2010). "HAYWARD, Sir John (c.1591-1636), of Acton Burnell, Salop; later of Hollingbourne and Rochester, Kent". In Thrush, Andrew; Ferris, John P. (eds.). The History of Parliament; the House of Commons 1604-1629 – via History of Parliament.
- Lansberry, Frederick (2001). Government and Politics in Kent, 1640–1914. Boydell Press. ISBN 978-0-85115-586-9.
- M.R.P. (1981). "SONDES, Michael (d.1617), of Throwley, Eastry and Sheldwich, Kent". In Hasler, P.W. (ed.). The History of Parliament: the House of Commons 1558-1603 – via History of Parliament.
- Peacey, JT (2004). "Livesay [Livesey], Sir Michael, first baronet". Oxford Dictionary of National Biography (online ed.). Oxford University Press. doi:10.1093/ref:odnb/16797. (Subscription, Wikipedia Library access or UK public library membership required.)
- Roberts, Stephen K, ed. (2017). "Surnames beginning 'L". The Cromwell Association Online Directory of Parliamentarian Army Officers. British History Online.
- Royle, Trevor (2004). Civil War: The Wars of the Three Kingdoms 1638–1660 (2006 ed.). Abacus. ISBN 978-0-349-11564-1.
- Scott Robertson, Canon (1882). "The Church of All Saints, Eastchurch in Shepey". Archaeologia Cantiana. XIV. Kent Archaeological Society.
- Wedgwood, CV (1958). The King's War, 1641-1647 (2001 ed.). Penguin Classics. ISBN 978-0141390727.

Baronetage of England
New creation	Baronet (of East Church); 1627–1660	Attainted
