= Colquhoun Grant (British cavalry general) =

British soldier

Lieutenant General Sir John Colquhoun Grant GCH, KCB
- Born: 1772
- Died: 1835 (aged 62–63)
- Military career
- Allegiance: United Kingdom
- Branch: (United Kingdom) British Army
- Service years: 1793 to 1835
- Rank: Lieutenant-general
- Nickname: The Black Giant
- Conflicts: Fourth Anglo-Mysore War; Siege of Seringapatam; French Revolutionary Wars; Napoleonic Wars; Battle of Sahagún; Battle of Vitoria; Battle of Waterloo

Lieutenant General Sir John Colquhoun Grant GCH KCB (1772 – 20 December 1835) was a British soldier.

== Military career ==
Sir Colquhoun Grant (Note: In common with a number of contemporaries, such as Sir Richard Hussey Vivian, he made use of a distinctive middle name in place of a common first name when knighted.) joined the 36th Foot as an ensign in 1793, exchanging (some years later) to the cavalry (25th Light Dragoons), with which he served at Seringapatam, but returning to the infantry in 1802 to command the 72nd Foot, which he led for six years. In 1806, at the head of his regiment he joined Sir David Baird's expedition to the Cape of Good Hope and on 8 January was wounded in action against the Batavian army at the Battle of Blaauwberg. On announcing the victory of the British in despatches Baird remarked:

"Your lordship will perceive the name of Lt.-Col. Grant among the wounded; but the heroic spirit of this officer was not subdued by his misfortune, and he continued to lead his men to glory as long as an enemy was opposed to the 72nd Regt."

He exchanged to the 15th Hussars in 1808, and took part in Sir John Moore's expedition to the Peninsular, being wounded at Sahagún fighting the French. He returned to Spain in January 1813, in command of a cavalry brigade, which saw action at the Battle of Morales. He continued to serve in this capacity, with one interruption, until the end of the Peninsular campaign. Wellington was less than impressed with the performance of Grant's hussar brigade at the Battle of Vitoria and Grant was eventually replaced in command. However, Grant's political influence meant that he soon returned to the Peninsular to take over command of the light dragoon brigade of Robert Ballard Long. He was appointed KCB in 1814. At Waterloo, Grant commanded the 5th Cavalry Brigade, consisting of the 7th and 15th Hussars with the 13th Light Dragoons attached, which was stationed in the centre of the allied position; during the battle he had five horses shot under him. Grant was promoted to lieutenant-general in 1830, and he served as a Tory Member of Parliament (MP) for the rotten borough of Queenborough from 1831 until the borough was disenfranchised under the Reform Act 1832.

Grant was a groom of the bedchamber to Prince Ernest Augustus, Duke of Cumberland, later King of Hanover. He was reputed to have been the strongest man in the British Army, and was given the nickname "The Black Giant." (Note: The nickname became popular when he commanded the hussar brigade in 1813, his towering frame and swarthy looks contrasted with the appearance of his constant companion, a diminutive red-headed brigade major. The descriptive phrase "The Black Giant with his Red Dwarf" became commonplace within the brigade.) He was appointed colonel of the 12th (The Prince of Wales's) Royal Regiment of (Light) Dragoons (Lancers) in 1825. He transferred to the 15th (The King's) Regiment of (Light) Dragoons (Hussars) in 1827, succeeding the Duke of Cumberland, a post he held until his death.

== Personal life ==
Grant died in 1835. He had married Marcia, daughter of the Reverend J. Richards, of Long Bredy, Dorset. Their only surviving child, Marcia, eloped with Whig politician Richard Brinsley Sheridan in May 1835.

== Bibliography ==
- Dalton, Charles (1904). The Waterloo roll call. With biographical notes and anecdotes. London: Eyre and Spottiswoode.
- Wood, Sir Evelyn (1895). Cavalry in the Waterloo Campaign. London: S. Low, Marston, and Company.
- Smith, Henry Stooks (1973) [1844–1850]. Craig, F. W. S. (ed.). The Parliaments of England (2nd ed.). Chichester: Parliamentary Research Services. ISBN 0-900178-13-2.

Parliament of the United Kingdom
Preceded by Thomas Gladstone; John Capel	Member of Parliament for Queenborough; 1831–1832; With: John Capel	Constituency abolished
Military offices
Preceded by Sir William Payne-Gallwey	Colonel of the 12th (The Prince of Wales's); Royal Regiment of (Light) Dragoons (Lancers); 1825–1827	Succeeded by Sir Hussey Vivian
Preceded by The Duke of Cumberland	Colonel of the 15th (The King's); Regiment of (Light) Dragoons (Hussars); 1827–1835	Succeeded by Sir Robert Wilson
