= Palmer baronets of Wingham (1621) =

Extinct baronetcy in the Baronetage of England

Palmer baronets
- Escutcheon of the Palmer baronets of Wingham
- Creation date: 1621
- Status: extinct
- Extinction date: 1838

The Palmer Baronetcy, of Wingham in the County of Kent, was created in the Baronetage of England on 29 June 1621 for Thomas Palmer. The third Baronet was High Sheriff of Kent in 1691. The fourth Baronet sat as Member of Parliament for Kent and Rochester. The title became extinct on the death of the sixth Baronet in 1838.

== Palmer baronets, of Wingham (1621) ==
- Sir Thomas Palmer, 1st Baronet (1540–1625)
- Sir Thomas Palmer, 2nd Baronet (died 1656)
- Sir Henry Palmer, 3rd Baronet (died 1706)
- Sir Thomas Palmer, 4th Baronet (1682–1723)
- Sir Charles Palmer, 5th Baronet (died 1773)
- Sir Charles Harcourt Palmer, 6th Baronet (1760–1838)

The sixth baronet died unmarried; the baronetcy therefore became apparently extinct in 1838, for want of a legitimate heir, though he had sons.

== See also ==
- Palmer baronets
