= Wheler baronets =

Extinct baronetcy in the Baronetage of the United Kingdom

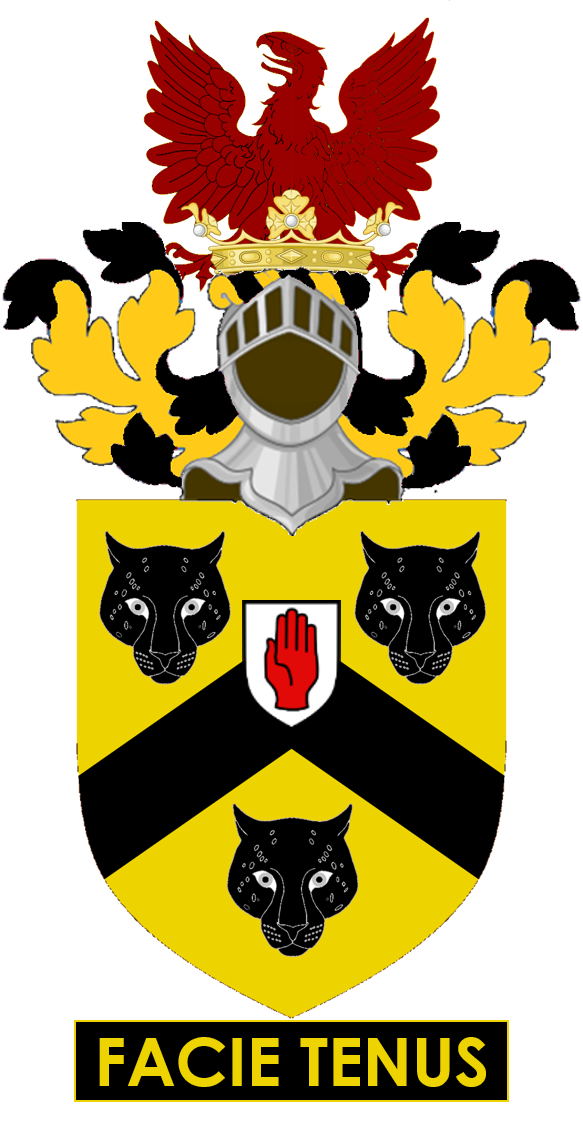
Arms: Or a Chevron between three Leopard's Faces Sable; Crest: Out of a Ducal Coronet Or an Eagle displayed Gules; Motto: Facie Tenus (Up to the mark)

There have been two baronetcies created for persons with the surname Wheler, one in the Baronetage of England and one in the Baronetage of the United Kingdom. One creation is extant as of 2008.

The Wheler Baronetcy, of the City of Westminster in the County of London, was created in the Baronetage of England on 11 August 1660 (365 years ago) for William Wheler, Member of Parliament for Westbury and Queenborough, with remainder to his cousin Charles Wheler.

The Wheler Baronetcy, of Otterden in the County of Kent, was created in the Baronetage of the United Kingdom on 29 June 1925 (100 years ago) for Granville Charles Hastings Wheler, Member of Parliament for Faversham. The title became extinct on his death two years later (1927 (98 years ago).

== Ancestry and history of the Baronetcy of the City of Westminster ==
Charles Lyttelton, a former Lord Bishop of Carlisle, and from an old Worcestershire family, said that the Whelers were seated in Worcestershire as early as Edward II. and bore coat armour.

In a manuscript volume in the possession of Hanbury, Esq. of Kilmash, Northamptonshire, entitled, Worcestershire Collected, by Sir William Dethick, Knt. Garter King of Arms, 1569, since enlarged by others.

George Wheler, of Martin, in Worcestershire; Chester, 1585.	Quarterly, first and fourth, or, a cheveron between three leopards faces of the second.
Di Pirie.	Second, argent, a bend sable, chased with three pears, or.
	Third, argent, on a cheveron engrailed, sable, three buckles azure, as many martlets, or.

Old arms of Wheler; for, in the east window of the chancel of Martin Hussingtree, in Worcestershire, these arms are quarterly:

1. Argent, on a cheveron engrailed, sable, between three buckles, azure, as many martlets, or. Wheler. (Note: In 1541, William Wheler, son of Gilbert Wheler, of Crouche, married Joan, daughter and heiress of —— di Pirie, of Martin Hussingtree, in Worcestershire (or he married —— Smyth, daughter and heiress of Smyth, who had married —— , heiress of —— di Pirie).)
2. Argent, on a bend, sable, three pears, or. Pirie.
3. As the second.
4. As the first.

Nash, in his Collections for the history of Worcestershire, says, that William Wheler presented to the living of Martin, jure Johanne uxoris sue sororis Thome Pyrye defuncti. Be that as it may, William Wheler, with Joan, his wife, had two sons:

1. John, who married Bridget, daughter of —— Walwyn, and died without issue.
2. Humphrey, the second son, and heir to his brother, married Joan, daughter of William Davies, one daughter, Bridget, who died unmarried and had three sons:

1. George, (see below).
2. Edmund, later of Riding-Court, in Buckinghamshire was knighted Knt. and was Sheriff of Buckinghamshire, (1615 (13th year James I), and married Elizabeth, daughter and heiress of Richard Hanbury, of London, but left no issue.
3. John, left no issue.

George Wheler, of Martin Hussingtree, in Worcestershire, the eldest son of William Wheler of Crouche (see above), married Elizabeth, daughter of J. Arnold (or Hernold), of Higham, in Gloucestershire, with whom he had two sons:

1. William, the eldest son, married Elizabeth, daughter and sole heiress of Sir Edward Puleston, of Allington, Knt. second son of Sir Edward Puleston, of Emerhall, in Flintshire, by Margaret his wife, daughter and heiress of John Aimer, of Aimer, Esq. and of Winifrid his wife, only sister of Sir Thomas Trevor, Knt. with whom he had one son: Charles (later the 2nd Baronet), and one daughter Elizabeth, the wife of Richard Binckes, vicar of Leamington Hastings, dean of Lichfield, and prolocutor of the lower house of convocation, and the strenuous assertor of the privileges of that venerable body.
2. John, who married Martha, daughter of Robert Kerrick, of Leicester, and was father of two sons:

1. John (born 1607), who married Friselina, daughter of George Warde, of Capeston, in Cheshire; he died, before his brother received a baronetcy leaving one daughter. Friselina afterwards married Lionel Copley, of Wadesworth, in Yorkshire.
2. William (1610), (Note: "The assertion that the 1st Baronet (is the son of parents, who did not marry till 1606) died in his 66th year (in September 1666) must be erroneous, being probably a mistake for his 56th year".) the first baronet of this family (see below).
one or two daughters: (Note: Cokayne 1903, p. 106 and Betham 1801, p. 160 record one daughter but under different names.) Mary (born 1608), and Eleanor, who married Samuel Randall.

After the Restoration, Charles Wheler was a favourite at court and he obtained the baronetcy, with special remainder to himself, (Note: Cokayne 1903, p. 106 notes: Apparently this was the second of such special remainders (see Cokayne 1903, p. 21, note "c.": although usual in the baronetcies in Scotland, the first English baronetcy with a special remainder was to Sir Henry Browne, 1st Baronet of Kiddington)) for his elder cousin Sir William Wheler, 1st Baronet, and 1666 on the death of the death of Sir William, Charles Wheler succeeded to the baronetcy. However Sir William and Charles Wheler had fallen out, apparently over Charles urging Sir William to execute a settlement of his estates upon Charles, so instead of doing what Charles wanted, Sir William left the bulk of is estate to others and Charles only received an annual stipend of £120.

The ninth Baronet was a Lieutenant-Colonel in the Army and served throughout the Peninsular War and at the Battle of Waterloo. The tenth Baronet was a Lieutenant-General in the Army.

== Wheler baronets, of the City of Westminster (1660) ==
- Sir William Wheler, 1st Baronet (c. 1610–1666).
- Sir Charles Wheler, 2nd Baronet (c. 1620–1683).
- Sir William Wheler, 3rd Baronet (1654–1709).
- Sir Trevor Wheler, 4th Baronet (1697–1718).
- Sir William Wheler, 5th Baronet (1702–1763).
- Sir William Wheler, 6th Baronet (1726–1799).
- Sir Charles Wheler, 7th Baronet (1730–1821).
- Sir Trevor Wheler, 8th Baronet (1763–1830).
- Sir Trevor Wheler, 9th Baronet (1792–1869).
- Sir Francis Wheler, 10th Baronet (1801–1878).
- Sir Trevor Wheler, 11th Baronet (1828–1900).
- Sir Edward Wheler, 12th Baronet (1857–1903).
- Sir Trevor Wood Wheler, 13th Baronet (1889–1986).
- Sir Edward Woodford Wheler, 14th Baronet (1920–2008).
- Sir Trevor Woodford Wheler, 15th Baronet (born 1946).

The heir apparent to the baronetcy is Edward William Wheler (born 1976), eldest son of the 15th Baronet.

== Wheler baronets, of Otterden (1925) ==
Escutcheon of the Wheler baronets of Otterden

- Sir Granville Charles Hastings Wheler, 1st Baronet (1872–1927), extinct.
