= Roger Palmer (MP, born 1577) =

English politician

Arms of Palmer of Wingham: Or, two bars gules each charged with three trefoils of the first in chief a greyhound currant sable

Sir Roger Palmer KB (1577–1657) was an English politician who sat in the House of Commons at various times between 1614 and 1644. He supported the Royalist cause in the English Civil War.

Palmer was the second son of Sir Thomas Palmer, 1st Baronet of Wingham, Kent and the elder brother of James Palmer, MP.

He was Cup bearer to Henry and Charles, Princes of Wales. In 1614, 1624 and 1625 he was elected Member of Parliament for Queenborough.

He was knighted KB at the coronation of Charles I in February 1626 and was Master of the Household to King Charles from 1626 to 1632. He was re-elected MP for Queenborough in 1626 and 1628 and sat until 1629 when King Charles decided to rule without parliament for eleven years.

In November 1642, Palmer was elected Member of Parliament for Newton in the Long Parliament to replace Peter Legh, who was killed in a duel. He supported the King and was disabled from sitting on 22 Jan 1644.

Parliament of England
Preceded by John Palmer; William Frowde	Member of Parliament for Queenborough; 1624–1629; With: Sir Robert Pooley 1624; Sir Edward Hales, 1st Baronet 1625; Robert Pooley 1626; Sir John Hales 1628–1629	Parliament suspended until 1640
Preceded by Peter Legh; William Ashurst	Member of Parliament for Newton; 1642–1644; With: William Ashurst	Succeeded by William Ashurst; Peter Brooke
