= John Baynham =

English politician

John Baynham (born 1565), was an English politician.

He was a member (MP) of the parliament of England for Queenborough in 1593.
