= Charles Wheler =

English cavalry officer

Sir Charles Wheler, 2nd Baronet (c. 1620–1683) of Birdingbury, Warwickshire, was an English cavalry officer who served in the English and Spanish armies. In 1667 he was elected a Member of Parliament for the constituency of Cambridge University. (Note: Some sources spell his name Charles Wheeler)

== Early life ==
Charles Wheler was born around 1620, the only son of William Wheler, of Martin Husingtree, Worcestershire, and Nantwich, Cheshire, and his wife Eleanor (died 1 June 1678, aged 85), daughter of Edward Polkston, of Allington, county Denbigh, and Winifred, only sister of Sir Thomas Trevor (1586–1656). (Note: Charles Wheler and Sir William Wheler, 1st Baronet were both grandsons of George Wheler, of Martin Hussingtree, in Worcestershire and Elizabeth, daughter of J. Arnold (or Hernold), of Higham, in Gloucestershire. Charles Wheler was the son of William (George and Elizabeth's eldest son), while Sir William was the son of John (George and Elizabeth's second son). This made Charles Wheler and Sir William first cousins (Betham 1801, pp. 159–160).)

Wheler was a student at Cambridge in 1638, and sometime Fellow of Trinity College, Cambridge, being ejected thence 18 April 1644. He was M.A. of that university, and was entrusted with others to carry the university plate to Charles I to help finance the Royalist cause at the start of the English Civil War.

== Civil War and Interregnum ==
Wheler served as a major in a Royalist Horse (cavalry) regiment from very early in the Civil War until 1644 when he transferred to a regiment of foot in which he served until early in 1646 when he surrendered to Parliament and was allowed to go into exile. In 1656 he was commissioned into King Charles II's Guards—then a regiment in the Spanish army—as a captain, his regiment fought under Tunney at the Battle of the Dunes (1658).

== Restoration ==
He was a Gentleman of the Privy Chamber, 1660 (probably until 1679), and apparently by then a knight. He was a captain in the 1st Foot Guards ( 1661–1672), the Duke of Richmond's Horse 1666 and Prince Rupert's Horse 1667. He was M.P. for the University of Cambridge (1667–1679) and Governor of the Leeward Islands 1671–1672). In 1678-1679 he was colonel of a regiment (which would later become the 7th Regiment of Foot).

Wheler succeeded to the Wheler baronetcy on the death of his first cousin Sir William Wheler, 1st Baronet on 6 August 1666, under the special clause of remainder, but to none of the grantee's estates. (Note: Sir William and Charles Wheler had fallen out, apparently over Charles urging Sir William to execute a settlement of his estates upon Charles, so instead of doing what Charles wanted, Sir William left the bulk of is estate to others and Charles only received an annual stipend of £120 (Ferris 1983).) On the death without children on 5 February 1676, of his mother's first cousin, Sir Thomas Trevor, 1st Baronet, Sir Charles inherited his estate in Leamington Hastings, Warwickshire. He died on 26 August 1683, and was buried at Leamington Hastings, aged 64. (Note: His will was dated 7 to 12 March 1683 and was proved 8 September 1683.) He was succeeded by Sir William Wheler, 3rd Baronet (1654–1709 his eldest surviving son.

== Family ==
On 7 August 1648, Charles Wheler married Dorothy (c. 1626 – 16 August 1684), daughter of Sir Francis Bindlosse, of Borwick-Hall, in Lancashire, and his second wife, Cecilia, daughter of Thomas West, 3rd Baron De La Warr (died 1687). (Note: Cecilia was buried at Leamington Hastings close to her husband.) They had three sons:

1. Trevor, the eldest son, became a major in his father's regiment of foot, and died on 12 October 1678, within the lifetime of his father.
2. William, the surviving son and heir. he married Teresa, daughter of the Hon. Edward Widdrington (second son of William, 1st Lord Widdrington), with whom he had four sons and five daughters.
3. Sir Francis Wheler, became an admiral in the Royal Navy and was knighted. He married Arabella, daughter of Sir Clifford Clifton, of Clifton, in Nottinghamshire, with whom he had children. He drowned when his ship was wrecked on the rocks of Scilly.

and two daughters:

1. Cicely, the wife of —— Blount, of ——, in Shropshire.
2. Dorothy-Elizabeth, who was a maid of honour to Queen Catherine, and married the Count of Nassau.

== Notes ==
Baronetage of England
Preceded by William Wheler	Baronet (of the City of Westminster); 1666–1683	Succeeded by William Wheler
