= William Boys (MP) =

English politician

William Boys (March 1541 – 1596) was an English politician.

He was a member (MP) of the parliament of England for Queenborough in 1589.
