= Cotuams House =

Georgian house in Kent, England

Coordinates: 51°15′41″N 0°37′28″E

Cotuams Hall is a Georgian hall in Eyhorne Street near Hollingbourne, Kent, England.

== Background ==
Cotuams House was built on the remains of the ancient Totnams Farm, a large estate which included several stables, an ice house and a farm house. It is believed that the estate was owned by the Culpeper family, a noble clan in Hollingbourne, at one point. In the early 1700s the first (west) wing of the current house was built, presumably in 1834 the second (east) wing of the house was built, because it is engraved on the brick work of the exterior wall "1834". The house contains many ceilings with horsehair and lime, a traditional plastering method. There are ship's timbers as support beams in the main reception room. Over the years the owners have maintained the sash windows. Within the 4 acres of land there is an ancient mulberry dated over 500 years old, and was planted by the villagers to commemorate the Tudor family's victory in the Battle of Bosworth Field in 1485.
