= Roger Palmer, 1st Earl of Castlemaine =

English courtier, diplomat and politician (1634–1705)

The Right Honourable The Earl of Castlemaine PC
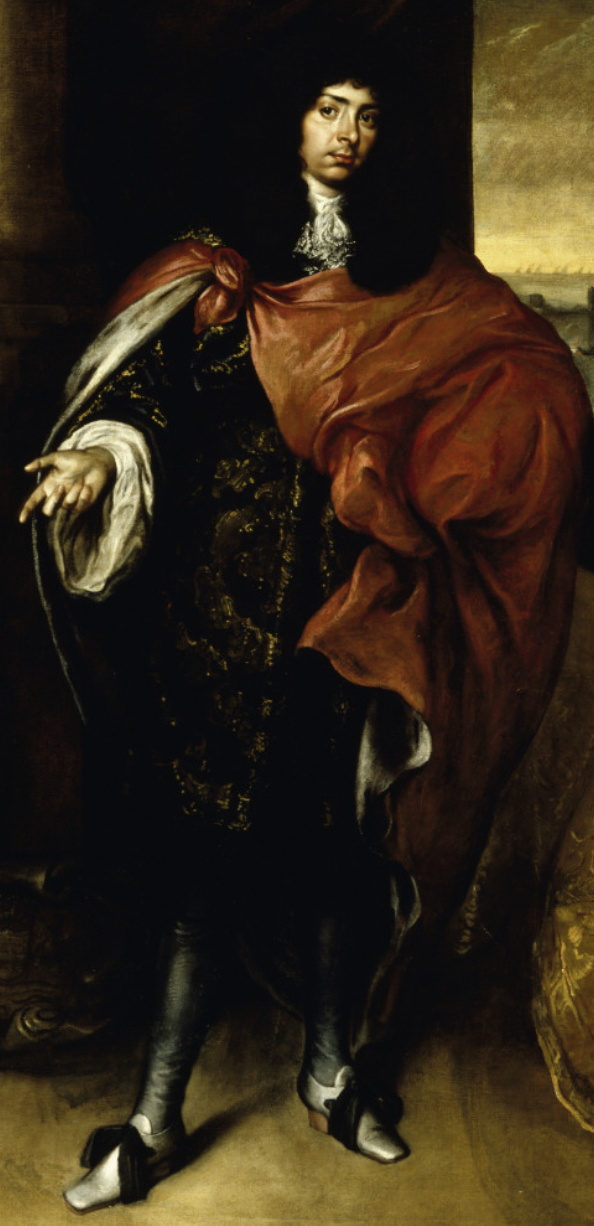
- Portrait by Sebastiano Bombelli, 1664
- Born: Roger Palmer; 3 September 1634; Dorney, Buckinghamshire, England
- Died: 21 July 1705 (aged 70); Oswestry, Shropshire, England
- Burial place: St. Mary's Church, Welshpool, Montgomeryshire, Wales
- Spouse(s): Barbara Villiers, 1st Duchess of Cleveland
- Parents: Sir James Palmer (father); Katherine Herbert (mother)

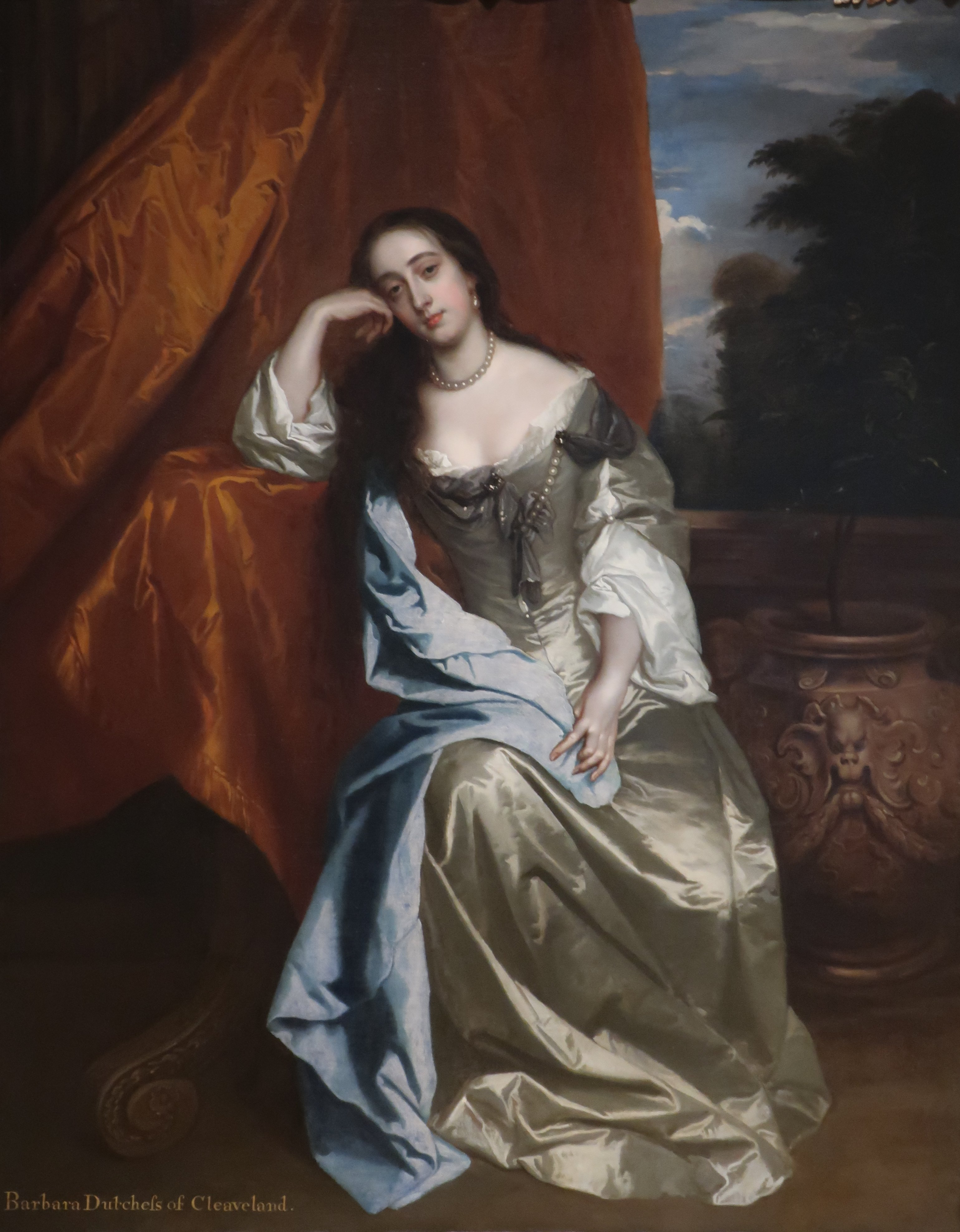
Barbara Palmer (née Villiers), Lady Castlemaine by Sir Peter Lely

Roger Palmer, 1st Earl of Castlemaine, PC (3 September 1634 – 21 July 1705) was an English courtier, diplomat and politician who sat in the House of Commons of England for part of 1660. He was also a noted Roman Catholic writer. His wife, Barbara Villiers, was one of Charles II's mistresses.

== Early life ==
Born into a Roman Catholic family on 3 September 1634, Roger was the son of Sir James Palmer of Dorney Court, Buckinghamshire, a Gentleman of the Bedchamber under King Charles I, and Catherine Herbert, daughter of William Herbert, 1st Baron Powis. He was educated at Eton College and King's College, Cambridge. He was admitted at the Inner Temple in 1656.

In March 1660, at the age of 25, Palmer was elected Member of Parliament for Windsor in the Convention Parliament. Following a double return, he was not seated until 27 April.

== Barbara Villiers ==
On 14 April 1659, Roger Palmer married Barbara Villiers, the only child and heiress of William Villiers, 2nd Viscount Grandison, a half-nephew of George Villiers, 1st Duke of Buckingham, and of his wife Mary Bayning, co-heiress of Paul Bayning, 1st Viscount Bayning.

In 1660, Barbara Villiers, his wife of one year, became mistress to King Charles II. The king created Palmer both Earl of Castlemaine and Baron Limerick in 1661, as Barbara's father had been Viscount Grandison of Limerick, but the title was limited to his children by Barbara (as opposed, that is, to any later wife he might have), which made it clear to the whole court that the honour was for her services in the King's bedchamber, rather than for his in the King's court. This made it more of a humiliation than an honour:

[...] and then to the Privy Seal, and sealed there the first time this month; and, among other things that passed, there was a patent for Roger Palmer (Madam Palmer's husband) to be Earl of Castlemaine and Baron of Limbricke in Ireland; but the honour is tied up to the males got of the body of this wife, the Lady Barbara: the reason whereof every body knows.

— Samuel Pepys, Diary for 7 December 1661

Palmer did not want a peerage on these terms, but it was forced on him; and he never took his seat in the Irish House of Lords (although he did use the title). Lady Castlemaine would continue her affair with Charles II until 1665, giving birth to five illegitimate children:

- Lady Anne Palmer, later FitzRoy (1661–1722), probably daughter of King Charles II, although some people believed she bore a resemblance to Philip Stanhope, 2nd Earl of Chesterfield, another one of Lady Castlemaine's lovers. She was claimed by Charles, Chesterfield, and Palmer. Palmer believed Anne to be his biological daughter, and became very attached to her, making her a trustee and the main beneficiary in his will until 1672, when Charles II formally claimed Anne and her sister, Charlotte, as his illegitimate daughters, giving them the surname "FitzRoy". Anne later became the Countess of Sussex through her marriage to Thomas Lennard, 1st Earl of Sussex.
- Charles Palmer, later FitzRoy (1662–1730), styled "Lord Limerick" and later Earl of Southampton, created Duke of Southampton (1675), later 2nd Duke of Cleveland (1709). Roger Palmer claimed the boy as his legitimate son and heir, having the child baptized as a Roman Catholic, but had a dispute with King Charles II, which saw the child re-baptized as an Anglican and renamed "FitzRoy" on the King's orders.
- Henry FitzRoy (1663–1690), created Earl of Euston (1672) and Duke of Grafton (1675) by King Charles II.
- Lady Charlotte Palmer, later FitzRoy (1664–1718), later Countess of Lichfield through her marriage to Edward Lee, 1st Earl of Lichfield. She gave birth to at least 18 children, 12 of which survived to adulthood to marry and produce grandchildren.
- George FitzRoy (1665–1716), created Earl of Northumberland (1674) and Duke of Northumberland (1683) by King Charles II.

In addition to a sixth child; who, unlike her siblings, was not acknowledged by Charles II:

- Barbara (Benedicta) FitzRoy (1672–1737) – Barbara Villiers claimed that she was Charles's daughter, but she was probably the child of her mother's second cousin and lover, John Churchill, later Duke of Marlborough

In June 1670, Barbara Villiers was created 1st Duchess of Cleveland, Countess of Castlemaine, and Baroness Nonsuch in her own right, inheriting the title from her husband.

== Career ==
While on a prolonged tour in France and Italy, he served as an officer in the fleet of the Venetian Republic in 1664 before returning to England later that year. In 1665, he served under the Duke of York in the Royal Navy during the Second Anglo-Dutch War.

Palmer showed unwavering and public devotion to Roman Catholicism, in spite of heavy legal and social penalties, and also staunchly supported the Stuart monarchy. His loyalty to the throne and the Stuart succession in general and to the person of Charles II in particular forced his acquiescence to his wife's position as the King's mistress.

As a prominent Roman Catholic, Castlemaine came under suspicion at the time of the Popish Plot alleged by Titus Oates and others. In the atmosphere of anti-Catholic hysteria of the time, Palmer was committed to the Tower of London and subsequently tried at the King's Bench Bar in Westminster for high treason. He had to represent himself and, as shown by the verbatim account in the State Trials, secured his own acquittal with skilful advocacy in his own defence against Judge Jeffreys and Chief Justice Scroggs.

He became a member of the English Privy Council in 1686, following James II's accession to the throne. He was appointed Ambassador to the Vatican, where he was ridiculed as Europe's most famous cuckold. As ambassador, he promoted James's plan to have Pope Innocent XI make his Jesuit privy councillor, Edward Petre, a cardinal. Innocent declined to do so.

After the Revolution of 1688, Castlemaine fled for refuge to Llanfyllin near his ancestral home in Montgomeryshire and stayed for a while in the house of a recusant there, but he was arrested in Oswestry, Shropshire, and committed to the Tower, spending most of 1689 and part of 1690 there. After enduring almost 16 months in the Tower, he was freed on bail. He was arrested and sent to the Tower again in 1696 after failing to attend the Irish Parliament, but was released again 5 months later.

== Death ==
He died quietly in Oswestry on 21 July 1705 at the age of 70, and was buried in the Herbert family vault at St. Mary's Church, Welshpool, Montgomeryshire. His estranged wife Barbara followed him to the grave four years later in 1709. Castlemaine's heirs included his nephew, Charles Palmer of Dorney Court, to whom he left property in Wales which had come to him from his mother's family, but it proved to be heavily encumbered and worth little.

His titles became extinct at his death. His wife's sons might technically have claimed them, since they were all born while she remained married to him, and there is a presumption of legitimacy in marriage, but no-one ever contended that they were in fact legitimate, and no such claim was ever made. The sons had, in any event, all been granted titles of their own by King Charles II, who had openly acknowledged five of Barbara Villiers' children as his own.

The writings of Roger Palmer, Earl of Castlemaine, include the Catholique Apology (1666), The Compendium [of the Popish Plot trials] (1679) and The Earl of Castlemaine's Manifesto (1681).

== Arms ==
Coat of arms of Roger Palmer, 1st Earl of Castlemaine
Coronet A Coronet of an Earl Crest A demi-panther rampant issuing flames out of its mouth and ears, holding in its paws a holly branch, with leaves and berries all proper. Escutcheon Or, two bars Gules, each charged with three trefoils Argent. Supporters Two lions guardant Argent. Motto Palma Virtuti (Latin: "The palm is for virtue")
