= Hollingbourne House =

Country house in Kent, England

- Location within Kent

General information
- Architectural style: Georgian, Neoclassical
- Location: Hollingbourne Hill, Kent, England
- Coordinates: 51.2680°N 0.6276°E

Design and construction
- Architect: Charles Beazley

Hollingbourne House is a Georgian country house with a Grade II listing situated on the summit of Hollingbourne Hill near the village of Hollingbourne, in Kent, England. The house was designed by architect Charles Beazley for Baldwin Duppa Duppa (Hancorn) around 1798.

== Architecture ==
Hollingbourne House is a Neoclassical Georgian country house with 19th century additions. The two storey principal facade is constructed in light buff brick beneath a slate roof. A central section of the facade, advances in two architectural stages and is topped with a pedimented gable. A further wing and the former coach house wing are situated around a rear courtyard.

== History ==
Edward Hasted records in his book The History and Topographical Survey of the County of Kent (1798) that during the 17th century, the estate was referred to as Hollingbourne Hill and that before that was called Eyotts. Sir Martin Barnham built a mansion on the site in 1609. This house was later rebuilt by Baldwin Duppa Jnr. around 1717, later becoming known as Hollingbourne Place. This was replaced by the current house built around 1799 which stands slightly further south towards the crest of the hill.

== Notable owners and residents ==
- Sir Martin Barnham (1548–1610) — Major Kent landowner and Sheriff of Kent (1598). Barnham resided at the Hollingbourne Parsonage (now known as Hollingbourne Manor) at the foot of the hill. He built a new mansion house at the summit of Hollingbourne Hill in 1609, just one year prior to his death.
- Sir Francis Barnham (1576–1646) — Member of Parliament (1604–1646) and Parliamentary supporter during the English Civil War. He inherited the mansion on Hollingbourne Hill built by his father Sir Martin Barnham. Through his marriage he also came into possession of Boughton Monchelsea Place while retaining the property on Hollingbourne Hill.
- Sir Gabriel Livesey (c.1568–1622) — High Sheriff of Kent and prominent landowner on Hollingbourne Hill and Eastchurch. Father of Sir Michael Livesey.
- Sir Michael Livesey (1611–1665) — Puritan activist, MP, and signatory to the death warrant of King Charles I. Livesey fled to the Low Countries at the Restoration, dying in exile.
- Sir John Haywood (1591–1636) — Member of Parliament and High Sheriff of Kent (1623). Haywood married Anne Sondes, widow of Gabriel Livesey and father of Sir Michael Livesey. He subsequently acquired the Manor of Hollingbourne Hill in his own name.
- Sir Cheney Culpeper (1601–1663)— Politician of the Culpeper family active during the Crown-Parliament disputes. Following financial troubles he passed the property away to Henry Pelham in 1647.
- Henry Pelham of Brocklesby (fl.1640s)— Lawyer and briefly Speaker of the House of Commons (1647). The property remained in the Pelham family until being sold by Charles Pelham to Baldwin Duppa in 1709.

=== The Duppa family ===
- Baldwin Duppa (1650–1737) — Storekeeper of Chatham Dockyard, He initiating the Duppa family’s long connection to Hollingbourne Hill.
- Baldwin Duppa (1682–1764) — Followed in his father's footsteps as Storekeeper of Chatham, rebuilt the original house in 1717. He was High Sheriff of Kent in 1735
- Bryan Phillip Darrell Duppa (1832–1892)— Colonial pioneer in Arizona. He is credited with naming Phoenix and Tempe. Known colloquially as "Lord" Darrell Duppa, He never returned to live at Hollingbourne House, preferring to remain in Arizona and receiving remittances from the UK.
- George Duppa (1817–1888) — New Zealand pioneer, the first settler in Oriental Bay, Wellington (c.1839) before establishing livestock farming ventures in the Wairau Valley. Returning to England with substantial wealth, he later purchased Hollingbourne House. He served as High Sheriff of Kent (1875). A member of the Royal Yacht Squadron, Duppa was a keen yachtsman and owner of the esteemed racing schooner 'Alarm'.

== See also ==
- Hollingbourne Manor
- Hollingbourne
- Leeds Castle

== Sources ==
- Hasted, Edward (1797). The History and Topographical Survey of the County of Kent. Canterbury: W. Bristow.
- "Duppa,George-Teara Encyclopaedia of New Zealand".
- "Barnham of Boughton Monchelsea Place, baronets -Landed Famiies Blogspot".
- "Hollingbourne House- Historic England Grade II Listing Entry".
- Evans, Elwyn Ll (1995). Hollingbourne & The Duppa Family. All Saint's church Hollingbourne and The Hollingbourne Society.
