= Listed buildings in Hollingbourne =

Historic structures in Kent, England

Hollingbourne is a village and civil parish in the Borough of Maidstone of Kent, England It contains two grade I, two grade II* and 72 grade II listed buildings that are recorded in the National Heritage List for England.

This list is based on the information retrieved online from Historic England.

== Key ==
| Grade | Criteria |
|---|---|
| I | Buildings that are of exceptional interest |
| II* | Particularly important buildings of more than special interest |
| II | Buildings that are of special interest |

== Listing ==
| Name | Grade | Location | Type | Completed (Note: The date given is the date used by Historic England as significant for the initial building or that of an important part in the structure's description.) | Date designated | Grid ref. (Note: The grid reference is based on the British national grid reference system, sometimes known as OSGB36, used by the Ordnance Survey.) Geo-coordinates | Notes | Entry number (Note: The "List Entry Number" is a unique number assigned to each listed building and scheduled monument by Historic England.) | Image | Wikidata |
|---|---|---|---|---|---|---|---|---|---|---|
| Hollingbourne War Memorial | II | | | | 13 June 2013 | TQ8398054879; 51°15′48″N 0°38′08″E | | 1415052 | Upload Photo | Q26676428 |
| Oakfield | II | Ashford Road | | | 26 April 1968 | TQ8336254193; 51°15′27″N 0°37′35″E | | 1367038 | Upload Photo | Q26648572 |
| Old England Cottage | II | Ashford Road | | | 27 September 1978 | TQ8258054456; 51°15′36″N 0°36′55″E | | 1060822 | Upload Photo | Q26313982 |
| Park Mill House | II | Ashford Road | | | 27 September 1978 | TQ8314354242; 51°15′29″N 0°37′24″E | | 1336281 | Upload Photo | Q26620788 |
| Sandhurst | II | Ashford Road | | | 31 July 1985 | TQ8399353684; 51°15′09″N 0°38′07″E | | 1344336 | Upload Photo | Q26628068 |
| Woodcut Farmhouse | II | Ashford Road | | | 21 October 1986 | TQ8170955152; 51°16′00″N 0°36′12″E | | 1045814 | Upload Photo | Q26297917 |
| Broad Street Farmhouse | II | Broad Street | | | 21 October 1986 | TQ8312056661; 51°16′47″N 0°37′27″E | | 1054898 | Upload Photo | Q26306545 |
| Brushings Cottage | II | Broad Street | | | 21 October 1987 | TQ8296256730; 51°16′49″N 0°37′19″E | | 1367032 | Upload Photo | Q26648566 |
| Brushings Farmhouse | II | Broad Street | | | 21 October 1987 | TQ8285656816; 51°16′52″N 0°37′14″E | | 1054896 | Upload Photo | Q26306543 |
| Pilgrims Cottages | II | 1, 2 and 3, Broad Street | | | 21 October 1987 | TQ8300756704; 51°16′48″N 0°37′21″E | | 1344337 | Upload Photo | Q26628069 |
| Ripple Farmhouse | II | Broad Street | | | 21 October 1987 | TQ8203856597; 51°16′46″N 0°36′31″E | | 1367051 | Upload Photo | Q26648585 |
| The Old House | II | Broad Street | | | 23 August 1985 | TQ8306456658; 51°16′47″N 0°37′24″E | | 1060824 | Upload Photo | Q26313985 |
| Wayfarers | II | Broad Street | | | 21 October 1987 | TQ8291556772; 51°16′51″N 0°37′17″E | | 1060825 | Upload Photo | Q26313986 |
| Whitehall | II | Broad Street | | | 21 October 1987 | TQ8215456997; 51°16′59″N 0°36′38″E | | 1344338 | Upload Photo | Q26628070 |
| Eyhorne Manor | II | Eyhorne Green | | | 21 October 1987 | TQ8315354595; 51°15′40″N 0°37′25″E | | 1060826 | Upload Photo | Q26313987 |
| 20 and 22, Eyhorne Street | II | 20 and 22, Eyhorne Street | | | 26 April 1968 | TQ8327454657; 51°15′42″N 0°37′31″E | | 1060793 | Upload Photo | Q26313955 |
| 34-40, Eyhorne Street | II | 34-40, Eyhorne Street | | | 26 April 1968 | TQ8335554655; 51°15′42″N 0°37′36″E | | 1374144 | Upload Photo | Q26655043 |
| 42-46, Eyhorne Street | II | 42-46, Eyhorne Street | | | 26 April 1968 | TQ8337154656; 51°15′42″N 0°37′36″E | | 1344358 | Upload Photo | Q26628088 |
| 47 -51 Eyhorne Street | II | 47 -51, Eyhorne Street, Hollingbourne Kent, ME17 1TR | | | 21 October 1986 | TQ8337654672; 51°15′42″N 0°37′37″E | | 1054832 | Upload Photo | Q26306485 |
| 50 and 52, Eyhorne Street | II | 50 and 52, Eyhorne Street | | | 26 April 1968 | TQ8339054656; 51°15′42″N 0°37′37″E | | 1060796 | Upload Photo | Q26313958 |
| 57,59,61, Eyhorne Street | II | 57, 59, 61, Eyhorne Street | | | 18 February 1985 | TQ8340654668; 51°15′42″N 0°37′38″E | | 1060829 | Upload Photo | Q26313990 |
| 6-16, Eyhorne Street | II | 6-16, Eyhorne Street | | | 21 October 1986 | TQ8324454639; 51°15′41″N 0°37′30″E | | 1344356 | Upload Photo | Q26628086 |
| 64 and 66, Eyhorne Street | II | 64 and 66, Eyhorne Street | | | 26 April 1968 | TQ8348254611; 51°15′40″N 0°37′42″E | | 1031382 | Upload Photo | Q26282742 |
| April Cottage Beaufort Cottage Fern Cottage | II | 28, Eyhorne Street | | | 26 April 1968 | TQ8329154658; 51°15′42″N 0°37′32″E | | 1060794 | Upload Photo | Q26313956 |
| Coachmans Cottage | II | 3, Eyhorne Street | | | 21 October 1986 | TQ8315154569; 51°15′39″N 0°37′25″E | | 1060827 | Upload Photo | Q26313988 |
| Elm Cottage | II | Eyhorne Street | | | 21 October 1986 | TQ8323154658; 51°15′42″N 0°37′29″E | | 1367083 | Upload Photo | Q26648615 |
| Foxgrove House | II | Eyhorne Street | | | 26 April 1968 | TQ8331154656; 51°15′42″N 0°37′33″E | | 1344357 | Upload Photo | Q26628087 |
| Garden Wall and Gatepier About 20 Metres to North North East of Cotauams House | II | Eyhorne Street | | | 21 October 1986 | TQ8323054638; 51°15′41″N 0°37′29″E | | 1060792 | Upload Photo | Q26313954 |
| Glyder House Sugar Loaves Public House | II | Eyhorne Street | | | 26 April 1968 | TQ8340554651; 51°15′41″N 0°37′38″E | | 1031373 | Upload Photo | Q26282733 |
| Godfrey House | II* | Eyhorne Street | | | 20 October 1952 | TQ8376254773; 51°15′45″N 0°37′57″E | | 1054873 | Upload Photo | Q17544955 |
| Lilac Cottage | II | Eyhorne Street | | | 26 April 1968 | TQ8329554675; 51°15′42″N 0°37′33″E | | 1060828 | Upload Photo | Q26313989 |
| Meadow Way Cottage Poste Cottage Small Mead | II | Eyhorne Street | | | 26 April 1968 | TQ8331454676; 51°15′42″N 0°37′34″E | | 1054849 | Upload Photo | Q26306501 |
| Niton House | II | 15, Eyhorne Street | | | 21 October 1986 | TQ8327654679; 51°15′42″N 0°37′32″E | | 1344339 | Upload Photo | Q26628071 |
| River Farmhouse | II | Eyhorne Street | | | 21 October 1987 | TQ8346954642; 51°15′41″N 0°37′41″E | | 1060789 | Upload Photo | Q26313951 |
| Snagbrook | II | Eyhorne Street | | | 21 October 1986 | TQ8388154934; 51°15′50″N 0°38′03″E | | 1344359 | Upload Photo | Q26628089 |
| Tanyard House | II | Eyhorne Street | | | 26 April 1968 | TQ8344354632; 51°15′41″N 0°37′40″E | | 1060797 | Upload Photo | Q26313959 |
| The Windmill Public House | II | Eyhorne Street | | | 26 April 1968 | TQ8333654650; 51°15′41″N 0°37′35″E | | 1060795 | The Windmill Public House More images | Q26313957 |
| Vine Cottage and Cottage Adjoining | II | Eyhorne Street | | | 26 April 1968 | TQ8333154674; 51°15′42″N 0°37′34″E | | 1344340 | Upload Photo | Q26628072 |
| Wall Bounding South-east Side of Eyhorne Street Starting About 10 Metres West of Cotuams House | II | Eyhorne Street | | | 21 October 1987 | TQ8317854586; 51°15′40″N 0°37′26″E | | 1060790 | Upload Photo | Q26313952 |
| Wimborne House | II | Eyhorne Street | | | 21 October 1987 | TQ8344554660; 51°15′42″N 0°37′40″E | | 1060788 | Upload Photo | Q26313950 |
| Mantels Farmhouse | II | Firs Lane | | | 21 October 1986 | TQ8149854694; 51°15′45″N 0°36′00″E | | 1354765 | Upload Photo | Q26637602 |
| Greenway Cottage | II | Greenway Court Road | | | 21 October 1986 | TQ8526054043; 51°15′20″N 0°39′13″E | | 1025878 | Upload Photo | Q26276806 |
| Greenway Court | II | Greenway Court Road | | | 21 October 1986 | TQ8528454064; 51°15′20″N 0°39′14″E | | 1060798 | Upload Photo | Q26313960 |
| Autumn Cottage | II | Musket Lane | | | 21 October 1986 | TQ8312354692; 51°15′43″N 0°37′24″E | | 1344361 | Upload Photo | Q26628091 |
| Bank Cottages | II | Pilgrims Way | | | 21 October 1986 | TQ8447455405; 51°16′05″N 0°38′35″E | | 1025853 | Upload Photo | Q26276785 |
| Forge Cottages | II | Pilgrims Way | | | 8 July 1985 | TQ8444355376; 51°16′04″N 0°38′33″E | | 1060801 | Upload Photo | Q26313963 |
| Woodgate Yew Trees | II | Pilgrims Way | | | 13 March 1974 | TQ8444155399; 51°16′04″N 0°38′33″E | | 1025306 | Upload Photo | Q26276169 |
| Marshalls Farm | II | Ringlestone Road | | | 21 October 1986 | TQ8600456188; 51°16′28″N 0°39′55″E | | 1344362 | Upload Photo | Q26628092 |
| Tile Barn Cottages | II | Ringlestone Road | | | 21 October 1986 | TQ8628855886; 51°16′18″N 0°40′09″E | | 1149363 | Upload Photo | Q26442277 |
| Cotuams House, the Cottage and Wall and Gatepier Attached to Northwest | II | Eyhorne Street | | | 26 April 1968 | TQ8320954608; 51°15′40″N 0°37′28″E | | 1060791 | Upload Photo | Q16890654 |
| Donkey Wheel About 70 Metres North West of Hollingbourne House | II | The Hill | | | 21 October 1987 | TQ8546056063; 51°16′25″N 0°39′27″E | | 1025848 | Upload Photo | Q26276780 |
| Gazebo About 100 Metres North West of Hollingbourne House | II | The Hill | | | 21 October 1987 | TQ8537256073; 51°16′25″N 0°39′22″E | | 1060799 | Upload Photo | Q26313961 |
| Hollingbourne House | II | The Hill | | | 3 February 1984 | TQ8545755990; 51°16′22″N 0°39′26″E | | 1025842 | Upload Photo | Q26276773 |
| Smiths Farmhouse | II | The Hill | | | 22 January 1985 | TQ8539356202; 51°16′29″N 0°39′24″E | | 1060800 | Upload Photo | Q26313962 |
| Church of All Saints | I | Upper Street | | | 26 April 1968 | TQ8433655085; 51°15′54″N 0°38′27″E | | 1203836 | Church of All Saints More images | Q4729479 |
| Former King's Head Inn | II | Upper Street, ME17 1UW | | | 26 April 1968 | TQ8447955349; 51°16′03″N 0°38′35″E | | 1203811 | Former King's Head Inn More images | Q26499319 |
| Garden Wall About 3 Metre East of Base of North Wing of Hollingbourne Manor | II | Upper Street | | | 26 April 1968 | TQ8438755279; 51°16′01″N 0°38′30″E | | 1344347 | Upload Photo | Q26628079 |
| Garden Wall About 3 Metres East of South Wing of Hollingbourne Manor | II | Upper Street | | | 26 April 1968 | TQ8436755260; 51°16′00″N 0°38′29″E | | 1060808 | Upload Photo | Q26313968 |
| Grove House | II | Upper Street | | | 26 April 1968 | TQ8439755198; 51°15′58″N 0°38′30″E | | 1060803 | Upload Photo | Q26313965 |
| Hollingbourne Manor | I | Upper Street | | | 20 October 1952 | TQ8436155283; 51°16′01″N 0°38′29″E | | 1203946 | Hollingbourne Manor More images | Q5881417 |
| Malt Cottage | II | Upper Street | | | 21 October 1986 | TQ8444855319; 51°16′02″N 0°38′33″E | | 1281525 | Upload Photo | Q26570567 |
| Malt House | II* | Upper Street | | | 20 October 1952 | TQ8446655336; 51°16′02″N 0°38′34″E | | 1344363 | Upload Photo | Q17545405 |
| Manor Farmhouse | II | Upper Street | | | 21 October 1986 | TQ8426855159; 51°15′57″N 0°38′24″E | | 1060807 | Upload Photo | Q26313967 |
| Mill House | II | Upper Street | | | 21 October 1986 | TQ8428055179; 51°15′57″N 0°38′24″E | | 1203911 | Upload Photo | Q26499411 |
| Penn Court | II | Upper Street | | | 26 April 1968 | TQ8423255281; 51°16′01″N 0°38′22″E | | 1344329 | Upload Photo | Q26628061 |
| Six Bells | II | Upper Street, ME17 1UJ | | | 26 April 1968 | TQ8437455127; 51°15′56″N 0°38′29″E | | 1060804 | Upload Photo | Q26313966 |
| Table Tomb About 2 Metres North of Porch of Church of All Saints | II | Upper Street | | | 21 October 1986 | TQ8433455104; 51°15′55″N 0°38′27″E | | 1060806 | Upload Photo | Q95059442 |
| Table Tomb About 2.5 Metres East of Vestry of Church of All Saints | II | Upper Street | | | 21 October 1986 | TQ8434555071; 51°15′54″N 0°38′27″E | | 1203889 | Upload Photo | Q95059458 |
| Table Tomb About 22 Metres South of Church of All Saints | II | Upper Street | | | 21 October 1986 | TQ8432455055; 51°15′53″N 0°38′26″E | | 1344328 | Upload Photo | Q95059511 |
| Table Tomb About 6 Metres South of Church of All Saints | II | Upper Street | | | 21 October 1986 | TQ8431755070; 51°15′54″N 0°38′26″E | | 1281484 | Upload Photo | Q95059494 |
| Table Tomb to Edward Charlton About 2.5 Metres South of Church of All Saints | II | Upper Street | | | 21 October 1986 | TQ8432655075; 51°15′54″N 0°38′26″E | | 1060805 | Upload Photo | Q95059410 |
| Table Tomb to Richard Thomas About 43 Metres South of Church of All Saints | II | Upper Street | | | 21 October 1986 | TQ8431055041; 51°15′53″N 0°38′26″E | | 1281481 | Upload Photo | Q95059474 |
| The Old Cottage and the Small Cottage | II | Upper Street, M17 1UJ | | | 26 April 1968 | TQ8436255114; 51°15′55″N 0°38′28″E | | 1344327 | Upload Photo | Q26628060 |
| The Old Forge | II | Upper Street | | | 26 April 1968 | TQ8446655360; 51°16′03″N 0°38′34″E | | 1060772 | Upload Photo | Q26313938 |
| The Old Vicarage | II | Upper Street | | | 21 October 1986 | TQ8439555154; 51°15′57″N 0°38′30″E | | 1315890 | Upload Photo | Q26602232 |

== See also ==
- Grade I listed buildings in Kent
- Grade II* listed buildings in Kent

== Sources ==
- Newman, John (2012) [1969], Kent: West and the Weald, The Buildings of England, New Haven and London: Yale University Press, ISBN 978-0-300-18509-6
