= Richard Evans (died 1762) =

Richard Evans (died 1762) of Queenborough, Kent was a British army officer and Whig politician who sat in the House of Commons from 1729 to 1754.

Evans’ parentage is unknown, but a two-storey red brick house at 72 and 74 High Street, Queenborough, dating from the early 18th century, has a plaster plaque above the doors, bearing the date and initials '1706 ERE', possibly referring to Richard Evans and his wife. He joined the army and was a captain in Colonel Richard Sutton's Foot in 1709. He was on half-pay in 1713 and captain of Invalids for Portsmouth in 1715. From 1725 he was lieutenant governor of Sheerness, remaining in post for the rest of his life. He was mayor of Queenborough several times.

Evans was returned as Member of Parliament for Queenborough on his own interest with government support at a by-election on 27 January 1729. He was returned again unopposed in 1734 and 1741 and in a contest in 1747. He was also able to secure the return of other government nominees and Pelham commended his ability to settle the interest in Whig hands. However, in 1750 there was a dispute with some of the townsmen on non-resident freemen and Pelham, referring to Evans as a strange fellow, saw him as likely to lose the seat for the Whigs. After Pelham's death, Newcastle persuaded Evans to withdraw at the 1754 British general election although occasionally taking his advice on local patronage.

Evans was married and died on 22 November 1762, leaving a son and two daughters. He apparently gave all his personal estate to a Scotch girl, described as his ‘tucker-in’, whom he made executrix, and excluded his own children as much as possible from his will. The girl ‘pulled the house to pieces’ and sold all the family goods, and disappeared, without paying the testator's debts.

Parliament of Great Britain
Preceded by Sprig Manesty; Captain Sir George Saunders	Member of Parliament for Queenborough; British general election 1729–1754; With: Captain Sir George Saunders 1729-1735; Lord Archibald Hamilton 1735-1741; Thomas Newnham 1741-1754	Succeeded by Sir Charles Frederick; Captain Sir Peircy Brett
