= Peter Legh (died 1642) =

Peter Legh (c.1622/23 – 2 February 1642) was an English politician who sat in the House of Commons between 1640 and his death in 1642. He died after fighting a duel.

Legh of Lyme Hall, Cheshire, was the grandson of Sir Peter Legh, MP for Wigan in 1586 and 1589. His father, Piers, died while he was a child and he succeeded to his grandfather's estates on 17 February 1636. He was sent to a grammar school at Amersham, Buckinghamshire under Dr Robert Challenor and then to Oriel College, Oxford, which he entered on 25 January 1638/39 aged sixteen.

In November 1640, Legh, aged about seventeen, was elected member of parliament for Newton in the Long Parliament. On 27 January 1642 he attended a play and after a mistaken piece of horseplay was injured in a duel by Valentine Browne, a student of Gray's Inn and nephew of Lord Herbert of Cherbury, and died six days later at a lodging in Acton, Middlesex. He was buried at Winwick, Cheshire.

Parliament of England
Preceded by Sir Richard Wynn, 2nd Baronet; William Sherman	Member of Parliament for Newton; 1640–1642; With: William Ashurst	Succeeded by William Ashurst; Sir Roger Palmer
