= Sir Francis Wheler, 10th Baronet =

- Born: 1801
- Died: 4 April 1878 (aged 76–77)
- Military career
- Allegiance: British India
- Branch: British Indian Army
- Rank: Major general
- Awards: Companion of the Order of the Bath

Major-General Sir Francis Wheler, 10th Baronet, CB (1801 – 4 April 1878) was a British Indian Army officer who served in the Bengal cavalry.

He inherited the baronetcy on the death of his older brother Sir Trevor on 6 September 1869.

Wheler married twice:

1) 1827 Caroline Palmer, with whom he had two children:

- Harriet Anne Wheler
- Sir Trevor Wheler, 11th Baronet (1828–1900)

2) 1841 Elizabeth Bishop (ca. 1819–1900), daughter of William Bishop, of Grayswood, Surrey, with whom he had three children:

- Dorothy Wheler
- Lieutenant-Colonel Francis Henry Wheler (b.1848), Loyal North Lancashire Regiment; m. 1885 Jenny Highett, and had issue
- Colonel Charles Stuart Wheler (b.1851), 6th Bengal Cavalry; m. 1876 Alice Lilian Ogilvie, and had issue

Sir Francis died on 4 April 1878, aged 76. His grave is in the church of All Saints in Leamington Hastings near Rugby. Lady Wheler died at South Lawn, Hesketh-park, Southport, on 16 March 1900, aged 80.

Baronetage of England
Preceded by Trevor Wheler	Baronet (of the City of Westminster); 1869–1878	Succeeded by Trevor Wheler
