= John Parker (died 1619) =

English politician

John Parker (May 1548 – 1619) was an English politician.

He was a member (MP) of the parliament of England for Queenborough in 1571.
