= Hollingbourne =

Village near Maidstone, Kent, England

Coordinates: 51.267°N 0.642°E

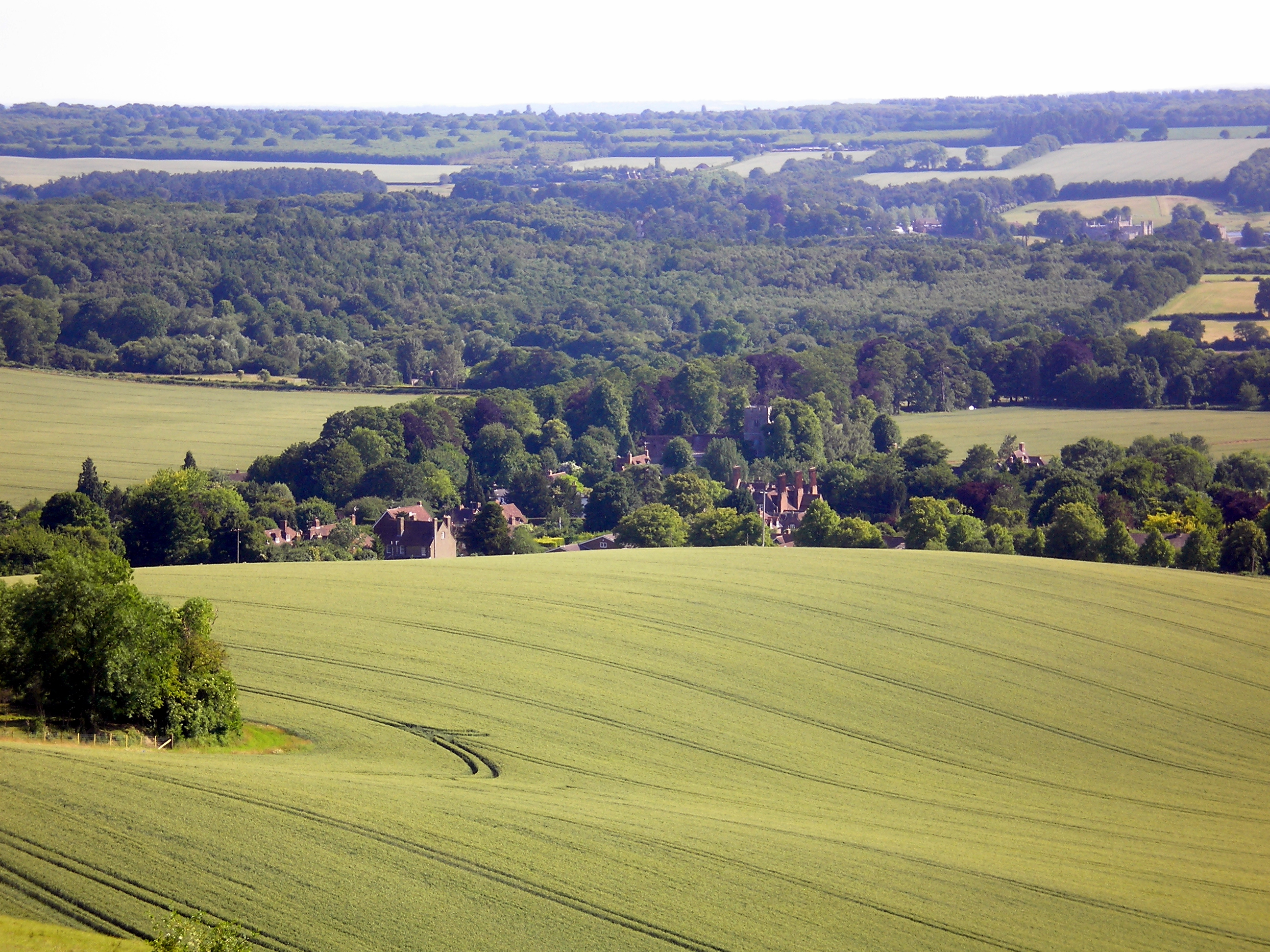
- Hollingbourne as seen from the North Downs

- Location within Kent
- Population: 858; 949 (2011 Census)
- OS grid reference: TQ845285
- Civil parish: Hollingbourne
- District: Maidstone
- Shire county: Kent
- Region: South East
- Country: England
- Sovereign state: United Kingdom
- Post town: Maidstone
- Postcode district: ME17
- Dialling code: 01622
- Police: Kent
- Fire: Kent
- Ambulance: South East Coast
- UK Parliament: Faversham and Mid Kent
- Website: www.hollingbournepc.kentparishes.gov.uk

Hollingbourne is a village and civil parish in the borough of Maidstone in Kent, England. The parish is located on the southward slope of the North Downs to the east of the county town, Maidstone. The parish population is around 900 and has three conservation areas: Upper Street in the village centre and the outlying hamlets of Broad Street and Eyhorne Street.

== Geography ==
The village is four miles (6.4 km) from Maidstone. Its church is dedicated to All Saints. Hollingbourne railway station, on the Maidstone-Ashford line, serves the village. There is also a bus connecting Hollingbourne to Maidstone.

The North Downs Way National Trail passes through the village, as does the Pilgrims' Way, an ancient trackway historically associated with pilgrimage routes to Canterbury. The village has two large public houses.

Hollingbourne Hill was a major measuring point in the trigonometric survey linking the Royal Greenwich Observatory and the Paris Observatory. The Anglo-French Survey (1784–1790) was led by General William Roy. It was also the origin (meridian) of the 6-inch and 1:2500 Ordnance Survey maps of Kent.

The parish hosts (adjacent to the historic village) part of the M20 motorway and the High Speed 1 rail link to the Channel Tunnel, and residents in 2007 joined forces with the neighbouring village of Bearsted in voicing their objections to the proposed Kent International Gateway development. The plans after a planning inspectorate appeal were in 2011 rejected by the government. Maidstone services lie within the parish on the north side of the motorway.

== History ==
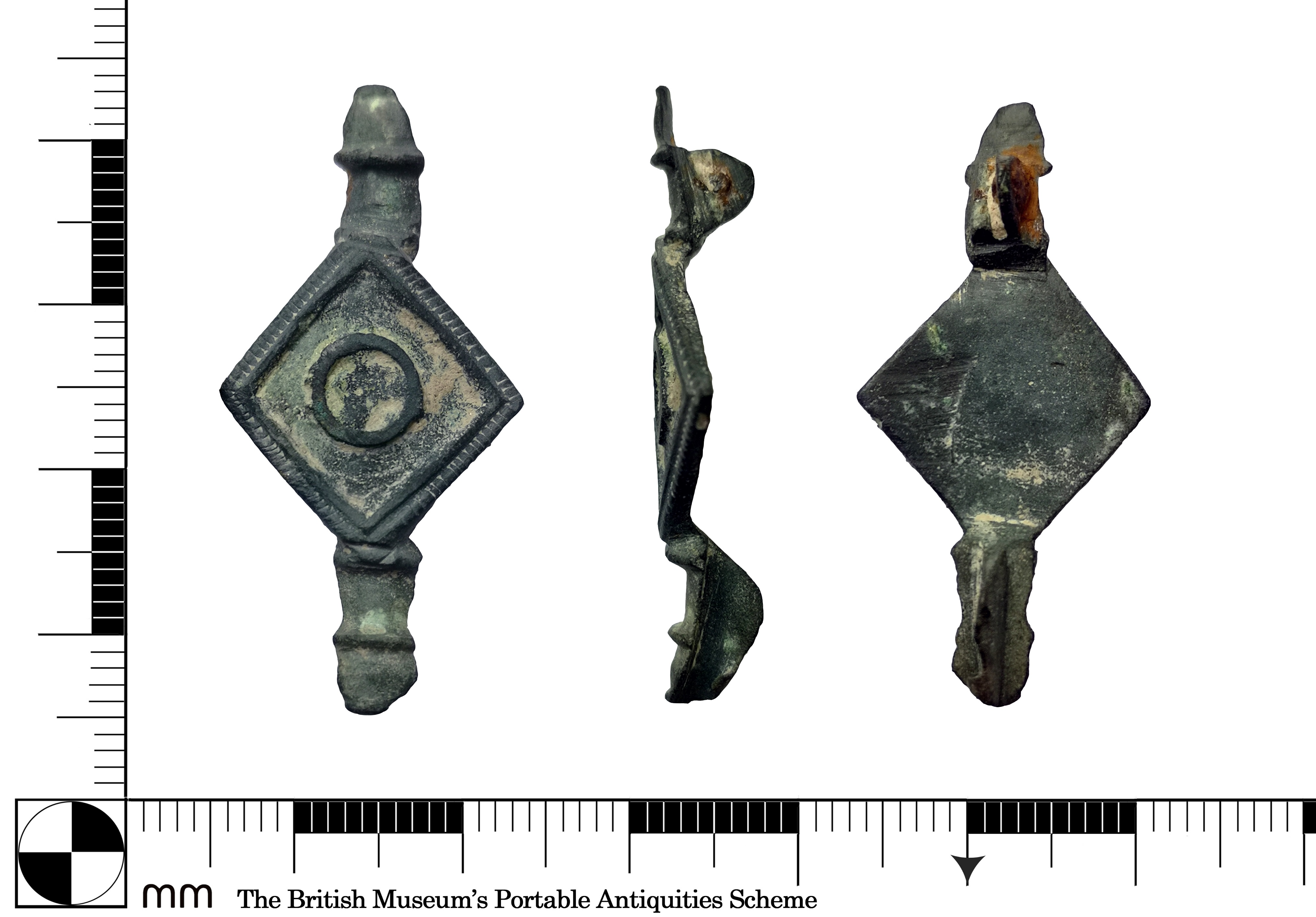
A Roman copper-alloy brooch, found in Hollingbourne in 2020 and dated to c. 100 – c. 200

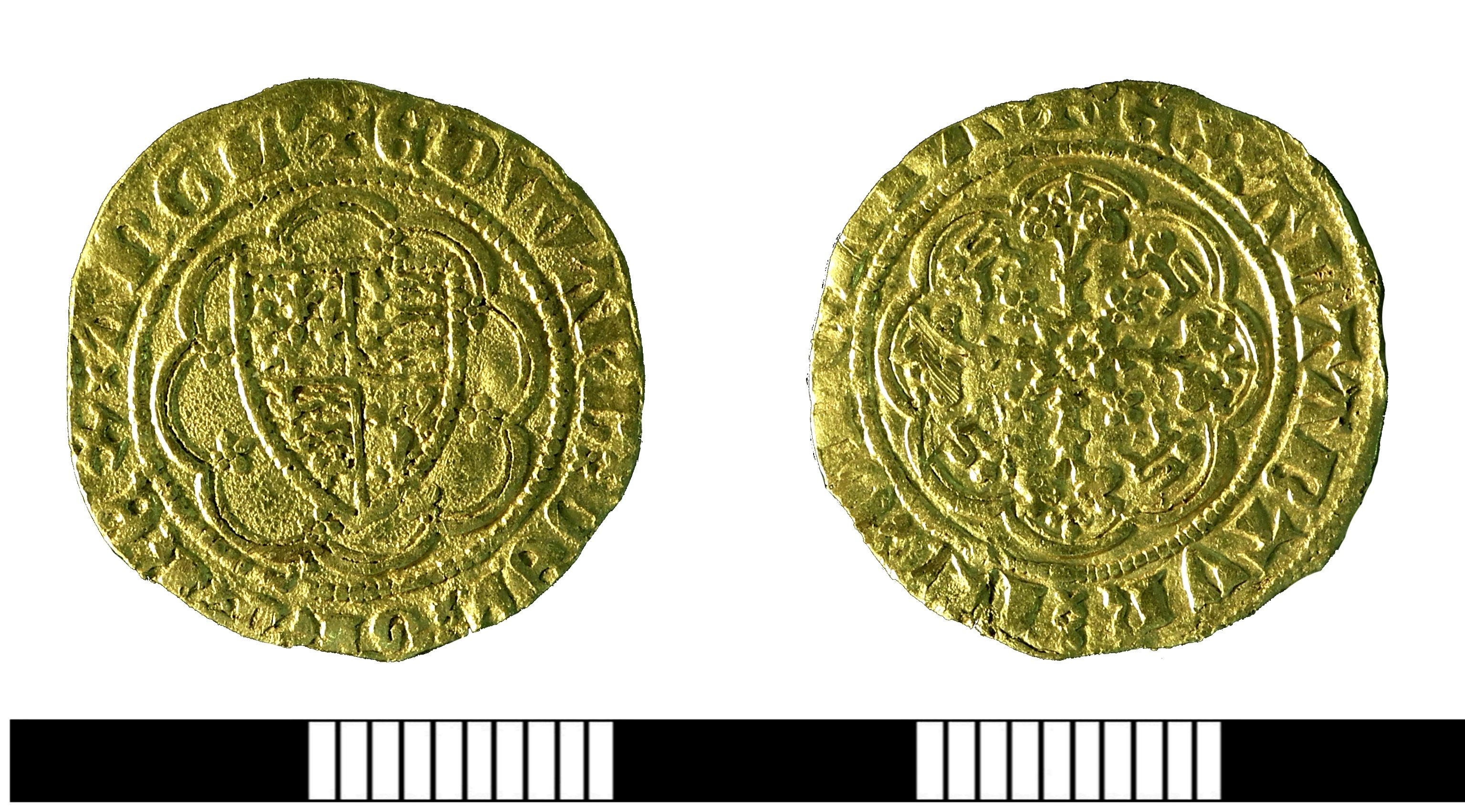
A gold quarter noble of Edward III, found in Hollingbourne and dated to c. 1363 – c. 1369

=== Hollingbourne village centre ===
Hollingbourne appears in the Domesday Book of 1086 as Hoilingeborde. It was held partly by the Archbishop of Christ Church, Canterbury and partly by Bishop Odo of Bayeux. Its Domesday assets were: 24 ploughs, 8 acres (3.2 ha) of meadow, woodland/herbage worth 40 hogs, two mills and one church. It rendered £30.

All Saints’ Church is a Grade I listed building, made of flint and stone, parts dated 14th, 15th and 17th centuries. Within the church are monuments and stone tombs to Francis Culpeper, d. 1591 and his wife Johanna Culpeper, d. 1597, Martin Barnham d. 1610, Baldwin Duppa d. 1737 of Hollingbourne Hill, Samuel Plummer, d. 1705, Dame Grace Gethin, d. 1697, Philippa Culpeper, d. 1630, Elizabeth Culpeper, d. 1638 (freestanding chest tomb with white effigy) John, Lord Culpeper, d. 1660, erected 1695, Cheney Colepeper, d. 1725, the latter were among the governing Virginia/ North Carolina Culpeper family and were major landowners in the village for many generations.

=== Eyhorne Street ===
This hamlet in the southwest of Hollingbourne parish has the Grove Mill House downstream on the Hollingbourne and its own conservation area. It has no church and has always been part of the parish. There are 26 Grade II listed buildings and one Grade II* listed building is shown on maps as restored Godfrey House.; its listing describes it as 16th century, restored 1859, timber framed with plaster infilling, 10-light ovolo-moulded mullioned and transomed oriel window with moulded cornice and plastered ogee base immediately below each eaves dormer, and one of six lights to first floor of porch, three rectangular ground-floor bays with 10-light ovolo-moulded mullioned and transomed windows on stone bases. Totnams was an ancient farm in the Eyhorne district, and is now the site of Grade II listed Cotuams Hall.

=== Colepeper / Culpeper Cloth ===
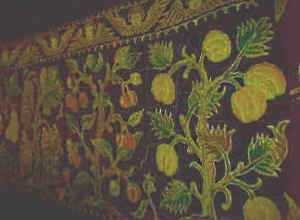
The Colepeper Cloth c.1650

The church is best known for the centuries-old 'Culpeper cloth', sometimes described as an altar cloth although it is probably too large to have served that function; several books attribute it to the four daughters of Sir John Culpeper, Lord of Greenway Court. It may in fact have been a funeral pall.

Hollingbourne Manor, a former home of members of the Culpeper family, is a Grade I listed Elizabethan manor house, located at the foot of Hollingbourne Hill. Cotuams House in Eythorne Street was also owned by the family.

== Governance ==
Hollingbourne in elections every four years elects one representative to Kent County Council, this is currently:

| Election | Member | Ward |
|---|---|---|
| 2017 | Maidstone Rural East | |

Hollingbourne elects one representatives to Maidstone Borough Council, currently:

| Election | Member | Ward |
|---|---|---|
| 2016 | Patrik Garten | North Downs |

The parish council has 8 elected councillors last wholly elected on 3 May 2012, with elections every four years.

== See also ==
- Hollingbourne Rural District (1894–1974)
- Hollingbourne Station
- Hollingbourne Downs
- Mills on Hollingbourne Stream
- Listed buildings in Hollingbourne
