= Hollingbourne Manor =

Manor house in Hollingbourne, Kent, England

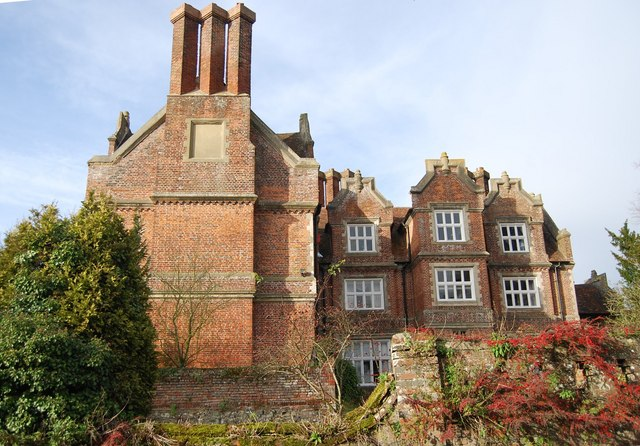

- Location within Kent

General information
- Location: Hollingbourne, England
- Coordinates: 51.26688°N 0.641293°E
- Completed: Late 16th century

Hollingbourne Manor is an Elizabethan manor house in Hollingbourne, Kent, England.

== Building ==
The L-shaped house was built in the late 16th century, and comprises the south and west wings of an incomplete E-shaped house, the north wing not being built apart from the first few courses of brickwork. It is constructed largely of English bonded red brick with a tiled roof and is a two-storey house with an attic roof featuring storey-height dormer windows. Door and window surrounds are of stone and window frames are timber. The walls are detailed with a rendered string course and projecting brickwork banding between the ground and first floors, a string course with decorative brickwork above the first floor and a cornice above the dormers.

The gables to the roof and gable projections above the dormers are partly stepped and detailed with heavy, rendered copings with cylindrical finials. The roof is punctuated with four wide chimney stacks, each capped with three tall brick chimneys set at an angle to the stack. The interior includes 18th-century panelling on the first floor and early 20th-century panelling on the ground floor. The house is a Grade I listed building.

It also served as the first headquarters of the Children of God movement when they spread to the UK in the 1970s, the group seeing more tolerance than over the pond in the US.

== See also ==
- Grade I listed buildings in Maidstone
- Hollingbourne House
