= John Hales (died 1639) =

English courtier and politician

Sir John Hales (1603–1639) was an English courtier and politician who sat in the House of Commons from 1628 to 1629.

Hales was the son of Charles Hales of Newland of Coventry, Warwickshire. He was a student of Gray's Inn in 1600 and matriculated at University College, Oxford, on 13 February 1601, aged 16. He was knighted on 17 July 1617 and was a gentleman pensioner to King James. In 1628, he was elected as a Member of Parliament for Queenborough and sat until 1629, when King Charles decided to rule without parliament for eleven years.

Hales died at the age of about 36. He was of Tunstall, Kent.

Parliament of England
Preceded by Roger Palmer; Robert Pooley	Member of Parliament for Queenborough; 1628–1629; With: Roger Palmer	Parliament suspended until 1640
