= William Butler (1544–1577) =

English politician

William Butler (1544–1577) was an English politician.

He was a member (MP) of the parliament of England for Queenborough in 1572.
