= James Herbert (died 1677) =

English politician

James Herbert (c. 1623 – April 1677) was an English politician who sat in the House of Commons variously between 1645 and 1677.

== Early life ==
Herbert was the son of Philip Herbert, 4th Earl of Pembroke, and his wife, Susan de Vere, daughter of Edward de Vere, 17th Earl of Oxford. He matriculated at Jesus College, Oxford, on 15 June 1638, aged 15.

== Career ==
In May 1646, Herbert was elected Member of Parliament for Wiltshire in the Long Parliament. He sat until he was excluded under Pride's Purge in December 1648. He was awarded MA at Oxford on 12 April 1648.

In 1659, Herbert was elected MP for Queenborough in the Third Protectorate Parliament. He was re-elected MP for Queenborough in 1660 for the Convention Parliament and in 1661 for the Cavalier Parliament. He sat until his death in April 1677.

== Personal life ==
Herbert owned Tythrop Park, Kingsey, Buckinghamshire, which his wife inherited from her grandfather in 1650. He died at the age of 54.

=== Marriage and family ===
Herbert married Jane Spiller daughter of Sir Robert Spiller of Laleham, Middlesex in 1645, when his father settled the manor of Milton Kent on him. His son James succeeded him. His daughter Mary married Sir Robert Worsley, 3rd Baronet. His daughter Jane married Sir Walter Clarges, 1st Baronet and had issue.

Parliament of England
| Preceded by Sir James Thynne; Sir Henry Ludlow | Member of Parliament for Wiltshire; 1645–1648; With: Edmund Ludlow | Succeeded by Edmund Ludlow |
| Preceded by Gabriel Livesley | Member of Parliament for Queenborough; 1659; With: Thomas Bayles | Succeeded by Augustine Garland |
