= John Brooke alias Cobham =

16th-century English politician

John Brooke alias Cobham (1535–1594) was an English politician.

He was the son of George Brooke, 9th Baron Cobham. He was a member (MP) of the parliament of England for Queenborough in 1571, 1572, 1584 and 1593. Four of his brothers also served in Parliament, including William, later 10th Baron Cobham, and Henry, who served as ambassador to France.
