= John Hayward (MP for Bridgnorth and Saltash) =

17th-century English politician

Sir John Hayward JP

High Sheriff of Montgomeryshire
- In office 1632–1633

Member of Parliament for Saltash
- In office February 1626 – June 1626

High Sheriff of Kent
- In office 1623–1624

Member of Parliament for Bridgnorth
- In office January 1621 – January 1622

Personal details
- Born: 1591 London
- Died: 1636 (aged 44–45) Rochester, Kent
- Resting place: St Alphege London Wall
- Spouse: Anne Livesey (ca. 1624-his death)
- Education: Emmanuel College, Cambridge
- Occupation: Landowner and politician

Sir John Hayward (c. 1591 – April 1636) was an English politician and landowner. He was MP for Bridgnorth in 1621 and for Saltash in 1626, as well as High Sheriff of Kent in 1623 and of Montgomeryshire in 1632.

== Personal details ==
John Hayward was born in 1591, second surviving son of Sir Rowland Hayward (1520-1593) and his second wife Catherine Smythe. Originally from an old Shropshire family, his father was a wealthy merchant and twice Lord Mayor of London.

In 1615, Hayward inherited his elder brother George's estates in Acton Burnell; around 1624, he moved to Hollingbourne Hill in Kent and married his recently widowed cousin Anne, mother of Sir Michael Livesey, a regicide who approved the Execution of Charles I in January 1649. They had no children and when he died in 1636, he was buried next to his father in St Alphege London Wall. His will records him as being resident in Rochester, Kent.

== Sources ==
- Hunneyball, Paul (2010). HAYWARD, Sir John (c.1591-1636), of Acton Burnell, Salop; later of Hollingbourne and Rochester, Kent in "The History of Parliament; the House of Commons 1604-1629". CUP.
- National Archives (1636). Will of Sir John Hayward of Rochester, Kent. 17 June 1636. PROB 11/171/361.
- WJJ; Hasler (1981). HAYWARD, Sir Rowland (c.1520-93), of Elsinge Spital, London, King's Place, Hackney, Mdx. and Cound, Salop in "The History of Parliament; the House of Commons 1558-1603". Brewer & Boydell.
