= George Saunders (Royal Navy officer) =

(1670/71–1734), naval officer

Sir George Saunders (c. 1671–1734) of St Olave's, Hart Street, London, was a Royal Navy officer, British official, and politician who sat in the House of Commons from 1728 to 1734.

Saunders parentage is unknown. He married Anne Dartiquenave, daughter of Charles Dartiquenave, and sister of Charles Dartiquenave of St James's, Westminster, paymaster of the Royal Board of Works.

Saunders was in the merchant service before joining the Royal Navy as a volunteer in 1689 on board the Portsmouth, with Captain George St Lo, and became for a short time a prisoner of war when the ship was captured in 1690. In December 1690 he joined the Ossory with Captain Tyrrell, in which he was present in the Battle of La Hougue. On 28 December 1692 he passed his examination, aged twenty-one, after serving in the navy for not quite three years. On 5 December 1694 he was promoted to lieutenant, and in January 1695 was appointed to the Yarmouth with Captain Moody. From 1696 to 1699 he was in the Pendennis with Captain Thomas Hardy. In 1700 he was in the Suffolk and in 1701, in the Coventry, again with Hardy, and in 1702 he was first lieutenant of the St George, the flagship of Sir Stafford Fairborne. He was with Sir George Rooke at Cádiz and at Vigo.

Saunders was promoted to the command of the Terror bomb, which he brought home in November after a stormy and dangerous passage. A few weeks later he was posted to the Seaford, a small frigate on the Irish station. By 1705, he was captain. From January 1705, he was in the Shoreham, and continued until 1710, cruising in the Irish Sea, chasing and sometimes capturing the enemy's privateers. He also convoyed the local trade between Whitehaven, Hoylake, Milford, and Bristol on the one side, and on the other from Belfast to Kinsale. From 1710 to 1715 he commanded the Antelope of 50 guns in the Channel.

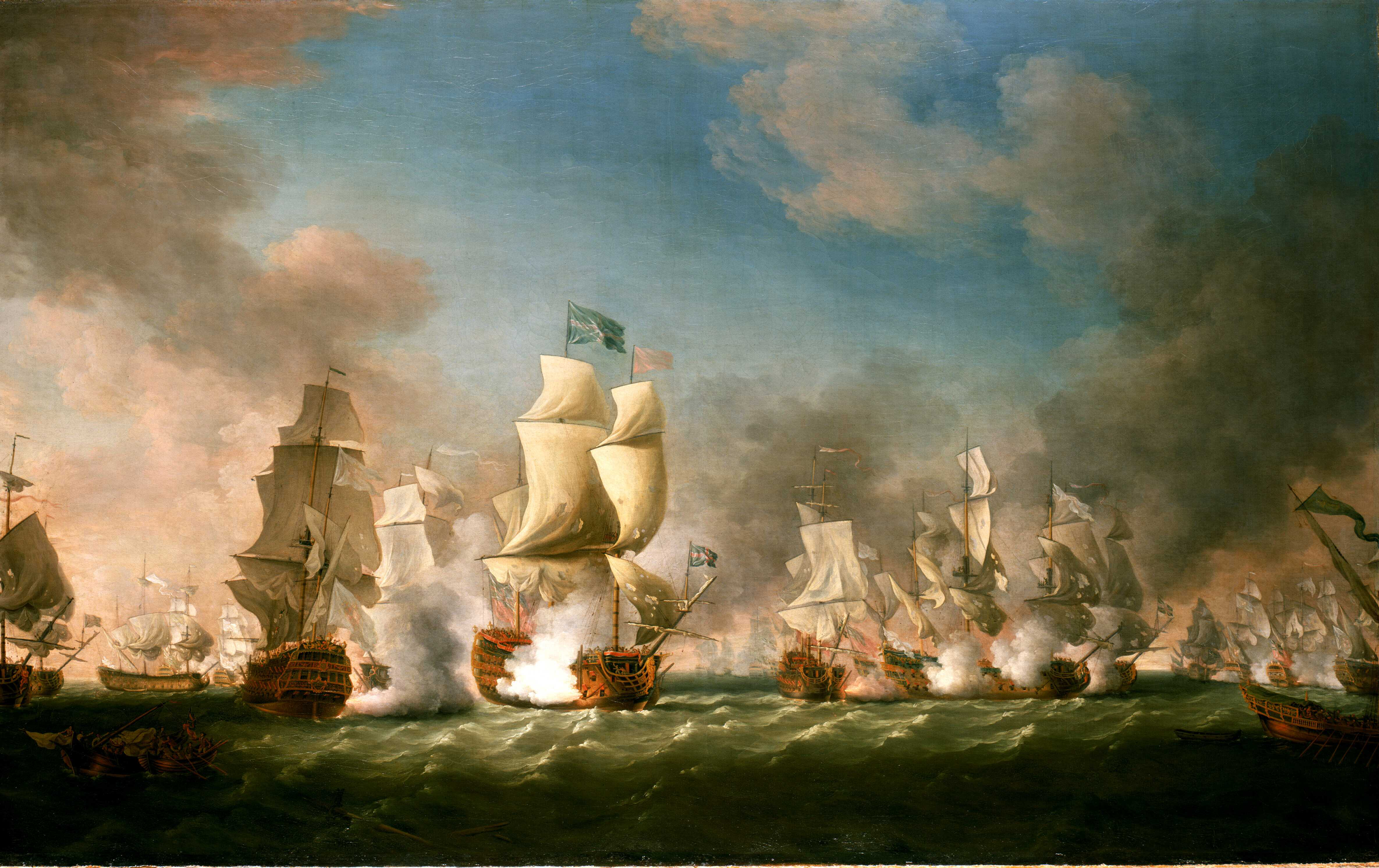
The Battle of Cape Passaro at which Saunders captained the flagship of the British fleet

In September 1715 Saunders was sent by Admiral Sir George Byng to Havre and Paris to investigate ships suspected of carrying arms for the Pretender. In 1716 was appointed to the Superbe, and served with Byng in the Baltic in 1717. He was chosen by Byng to be captain of the fleet, in actions against Spain off Sicily and Naples, between 1718 and 1720. He was 1st captain of the flagship Barfleur at Byng's victory at the Battle of Cape Passaro on 31 July 1718. In October 1719, he was sent to negotiate a treaty with the Order of Malta, and in May 1720, he arranged the armistice with Spain. He was knighted for these services by King George I at Hanover on 8 October 1720, while on his way home.

In 1721 Saunders was appointed Commissioner of victualling and in 1727 changed posts to Commissioner of the navy. He was returned as Member of Parliament for Queenborough on the Admiralty interest at a by-election on 20 February 1728. He consistently supported the Administration. In 1729 he became Comptroller of the navy treasurer's account and held this post until his death. He became a Rear Admiral in 1731. At the 1734 British general election he was returned again as MP for Queenborough.

Saunders died on 5 December 1734. He had one daughter Anna Maria who married William Egerton.

Parliament of Great Britain
| Preceded by Sprig Manesty; John Crowley | Member of Parliament for Queenborough; 1728– With: Sprig Manesty 1728; Richard Evans 1729-1734 | Succeeded by Richard Evans; Lord Archibald Hamilton |
