= Sprig Manesty =

British politician

Sprig Manesty (died 1728), of Woodford, Essex, was a British politician who sat in the House of Commons from 1727 to 1728.

Manesty was the eldest son of Samuel Manesty of Gray's Inn, and his wife Anna. He married Agnes Crawley, daughter of Andrew Crawley of Clapham on 25 April 1703. She died in 1718 and was buried on 19 March 1718. He married as his second wife Anne Miller.

Manesty became Secretary of the board of victualling in 1705 and served for over 20 years. He was appointed manager of the Sun Fire Office in 1725. At the 1727 British general election he was brought into Parliament as Member of Parliament for Queenborough on the government interest and was appointed a Commissioner of Victualling. He also became an assistant, of the Royal African Company in 1727.

Manesty died on 29 September 1728, and was buried at Clapham in the vault of his father-in-law. His children by his first marriage predeceased him, but he had two sons and a daughter by his second marriage

Parliament of Great Britain
Preceded by Captain Lord Forbes; Lieutenant Colonel John Cope	Member of Parliament for Queenborough; 1727–1728; With: John Crowley 1727-1728; Captain Sir George Saunders 1728	Succeeded by Richard Evans; Captain Sir George Saunders
