= Michael Sondes =

English Member of Parliament

Sir Michael Sondes (died 10 November 1617) of Throwley, Kent, was an English member of parliament.

He was born the second son of Anthony Sondes (died 1575) of Throwley, Kent, succeeded his elder brother in 1593 and was knighted in 1598.

He was a justice of the peace for Kent by 1579 and for Surrey by 1601. He was appointed High sheriff of Kent for 1584–85 and 1593–94.

He was a member (MP) of the Parliament of England for Maidstone in 1584 and for Queenborough in 1586, 1589, 1597, 1601 and 1604.

He married twice:firstly Mary, the daughter and heiress of George Finch of Norton, with whom he had at least 2 sons and 6 daughters and secondly Ann, the widow of Reginald Parker of Chatham.
