= James Palmer (1585–1658) =

English Member of Parliament

Arms of Palmer of Wingham: Or, two bars gules each charged with three trefoils of the first in chief a greyhound currant sable

Sir James Palmer (January 1585 – 15 March 1658) was an English Member of Parliament and Chancellor of the Order of the Garter.

== Origins ==
He was the third surviving son of Sir Thomas Palmer, 1st Baronet of Wingham, Kent and the younger brother of Roger Palmer, MP.

== Career ==
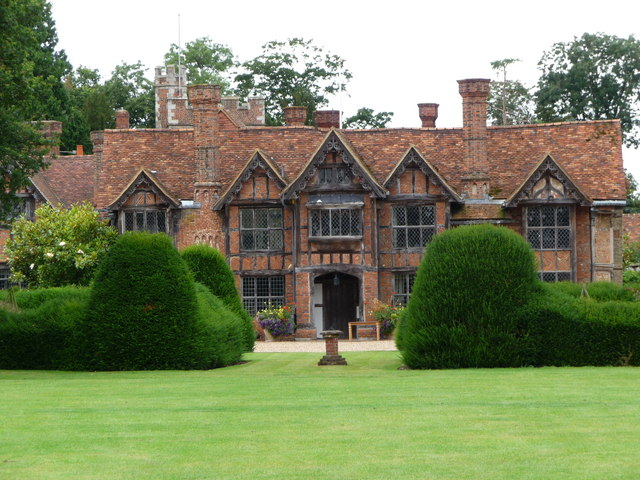
Dorney Court, Buckinghamshire, purchased by Palmer in 1624

Well educated, he moved to court and by 1609 had become a servant of the Earl of Montgomery. Under his patronage he was elected a Member of Parliament for Queenborough in 1621. In 1622, he was appointed a Groom of the Bedchamber to King James I and in 1629 a Gentleman Usher of the Privy Chamber to his son King Charles I, to whom he donated the Wilton Diptych.

He purchased Dorney Court in Buckinghamshire from his wife's family in 1624. In 1626, he was elected a Member of Parliament for Canterbury, sitting until 1628. He was knighted by King Charles I in 1629, and, in 1631, entered Gray's Inn to study law.

He deputised for Sir Thomas Roe as Chancellor of the Order of the Garter from 1638 to 1641, following him as Chancellor in his own right. He was also an artist and miniature painter, an adviser to the royal collection (to which he gave the Wilton Diptych), and governor of the Royal Mortlake Tapestry Works from 1638. His portrait of James I is in the Victoria & Albert Museum collection, his portrait of the Earl of Southampton in the Fitzwilliam Collection, Cambridge and his portrait of the Earl of Northampton is in the Royal Collection.

== Marriages and children ==
He married twice; firstly to Martha Garrard, a daughter of Sir William Garrard of Dorney Court in 1614; and secondly, to Catherine Herbert, a daughter of William Herbert, 1st Baron Powis of Powis Castle, Montgomery, and the widow of Sir Robert Vaughan of Llwydiarth, Montgomery, in 1625.

His issue with Catherine Herbert included Roger Palmer, 1st Earl of Castlemaine, PC (3 September 1634 - 21 July 1700), husband of Barbara Villiers, mistress to Charles II.
