= John Capel (MP) =

British politician

John Capel (31 October 1767 – December 1846) was a British politician who served as the Tory Member of Parliament for Queenborough from 10 June 1826 to 3 December 1832 where the Great Reform Act abolished the constituency.

He is buried with his first wife and their younger daughter in the vault of St. John's, Regent's Park, Middlesex.

== Other work ==
Capel served as the governor of the Foundling Hospital between 1791 and 1832 when he became the vice-president until his death.
