= Dorney Court =

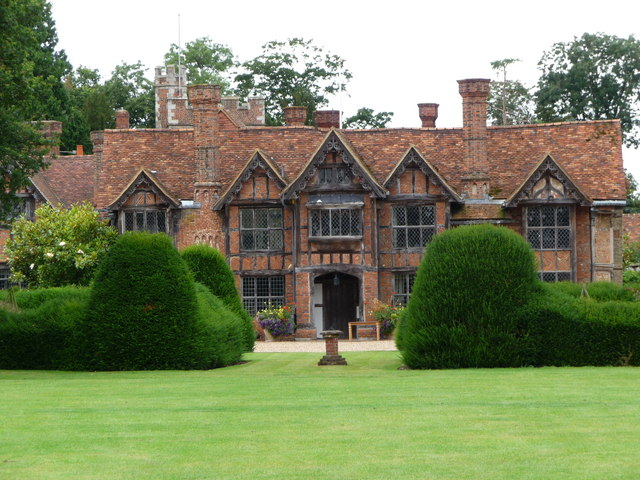
- Dorney Court, front facade

- Location within Buckinghamshire Location within England

General information
- Type: Stately home
- Location: Dorney, Buckinghamshire, England
- Coordinates: 51.5024°N 0.6759°W

Dorney Court is a Grade I listed early Tudor manor house, dating from around 1440, located in the village of Dorney, Buckinghamshire, England. It is owned and lived in by the Palmer family.

== Early history ==
Dorney Manor is recorded in the Domesday Book of 1086, as having been held before the Norman Conquest by Aldred, a man of Earl Morcar. In 1086, it was among the lands of Miles Crispin, and his tenant was a certain Ralf. From here it passed successively to families named Cave, Parker, Newnham, Paraunt, Carbonell, Scott, Restwold, Lytton, Bray, and Hill. In 1542, James Hill sold Dorney to Sir William Garrard, later Lord Mayor of London, and ancestor of the Palmer family which still owns and occupies Dorney Court today.

== Palmer family ==
Sir William Garrard, who bought the manor of Dorney from James Hill in 1542, served as Lord Mayor of London in 1555. He died in 1571, and was succeeded by his elder son, also called Sir William Garrard, who died in 1607, leaving Dorney to his wife Elizabeth, to revert to his son and heir Thomas upon her death.

The daughter of Sir William Garrard was Martha (died 1617), who married James Palmer (later Sir James Palmer, knighted 1629), and Dorney Court was acquired by her husband in 1624. This followed disputes within the Garrard family over the property, centred on Martha's brother Thomas Garrard, who married against the wishes of his father and whose own wife with her family also embroiled him in disputes.

Sir James Palmer (1585–1658), first of the Palmers of Dorney Court, was a younger son of Sir Thomas Palmer, baronet, of Wingham, Kent. He was Gentleman of the Bedchamber to James I and Charles I, Chancellor of the Order of the Garter (from 1645), a personal friend of Charles II, and an artist and miniature painter. He was also an adviser to the royal collection, and governor of the Royal Tapestry Works, Mortlake. His portrait of James I is in the Victoria & Albert Museum collection, his portrait of the Earl of Southampton is in the Fitzwilliam Collection, Cambridge and his portrait of the Earl of Northampton is in the Royal Collection.

From Sir James, Dorney Court has passed from father to son in direct succession in the Palmer family down to the present day. His younger son was created Earl of Castlemaine but his older son inherited Dorney (Sir Philip Palmer, 1615–1683). Sir Philip's fourth but, at his death, oldest surviving son was Charles Palmer of Dorney (1651–1714).

Charles Palmer's son inherited a baronetcy previously held by the senior branch of the family, the Palmers of Wingham in Kent. He therefore in 1723 became Sir Charles Palmer, 5th baronet, of Dorney. His own son, also called Charles Palmer, died before him, and so he was succeeded at his death by his grandson, Sir Charles Harcourt Palmer, 6th and last baronet, of Dorney.

Sir Charles had a number of children by his cousin, but no marriage was proved, and so the children were illegitimate, and the title came to an end at his death in 1838 (see G.E.C.'s Complete Baronetage, Vol I (1900) s.v. Palmer, and also Burke's Extinct Baronetcies). Dorney Court, however, continued to be inherited by succeeding generations of the Palmer family.

Dorney Court remains the family home of the Palmer family but is opened for visitors.

== Building ==
Enn Reitel filming The Optimist at Dorney Court, 1984

On first appearances, the building appears to be entirely medieval, but in fact some of the exterior is a Victorian reconstruction. The remodelling of the house was undertaken at the end of the nineteenth century, and the original bricks were restored to the front façade of the house. The interior layout is little changed from 1500. The oldest part is the panelled parlour, which contains some very fine examples of antique furniture. The great hall has numerous family portraits and contains linenfold panelling brought from Faversham Abbey in Kent; in times past it was used to hold the manor court, and it is still the site of the annual Commoners' meeting.

== In popular culture ==
Susan Cooper, who grew up in the village, uses Dorney Court (as the Manor) in her children's fantasy series The Dark Is Rising.

The house has been open to the public since 1981. It has featured as a location in numerous films and TV programmes, such as Hogfather and The Colour of Magic (Death's Domain), Midsomer Murders, The Optimist, ITV's Agatha Christie's Poirot episodes "The Adventure of the Western Star" and "Sad Cypress", 24: Live Another Day, Sliding Doors, The New World, All Is True and Bridgerton.

Dorney Court is the home of Form Plants nursery.
