= William Wheler =

English politician

Sir William Wheler, 1st Baronet (ca. 1611 – 6 August 1666) of the city of Westminster, was an English politician who sat in the House of Commons at various times between 1640 and 1660. (Note: Some sources spell his name William Wheeler) He was knighted by the Lord Protector in 1657 and was made a baronet by King Charles II in 1660.

== Biography ==
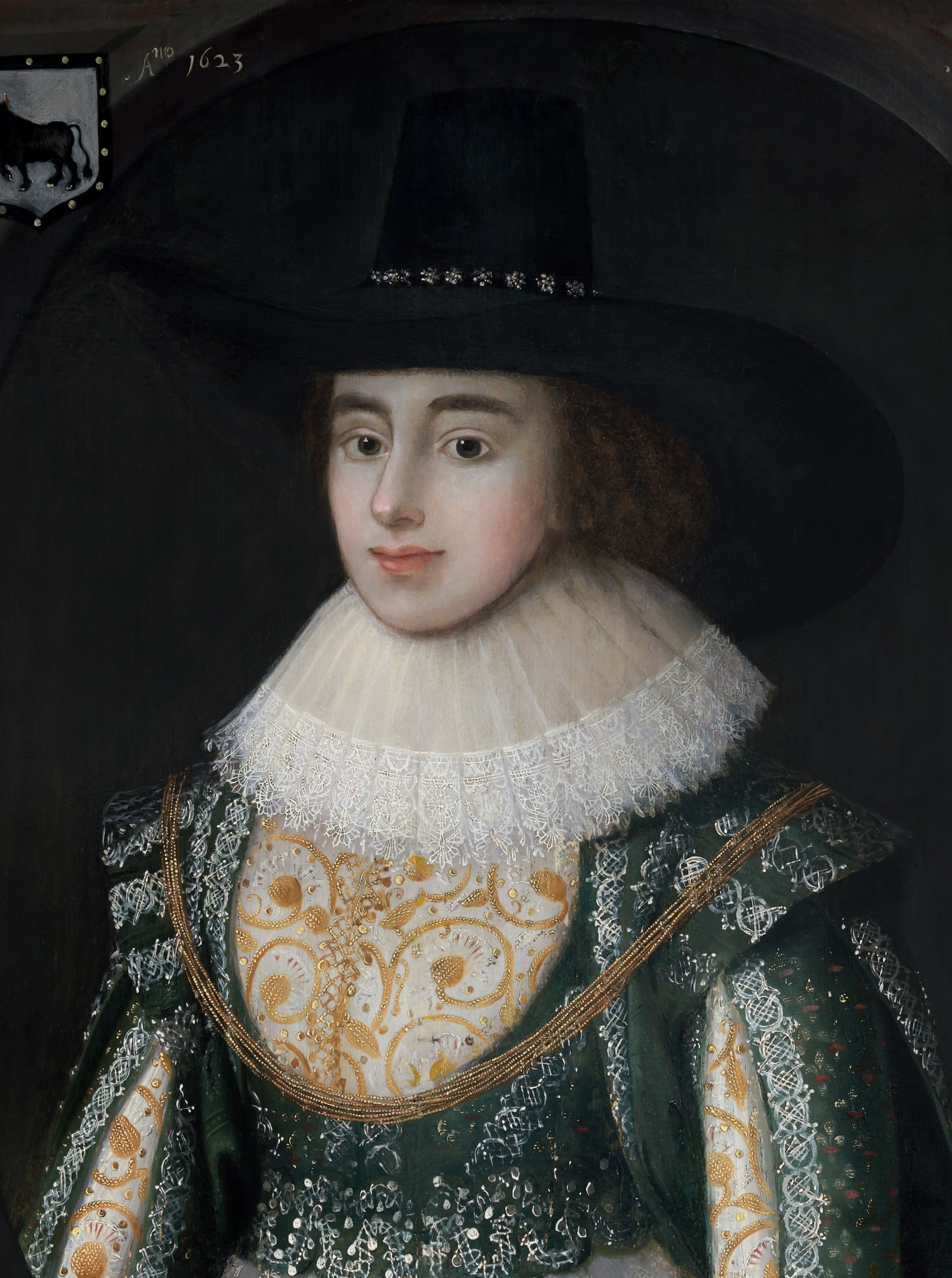
Elizabeth Cole, 1623, portrait attributed to Cornelius Johnson

Wheler of John Wheler, of London, goldsmith, (Note: Cokayne 1903, p. 106 notes: The parentage of the 1st Baronet has, in the more recent Baronetages, been attributed to Sir Edmund Wheler, of Datchet, Bucks, who was in truth his great uncle. That affiliation, however, is conclusively disproved in the Autobiography (Wheler 1911), where it is stated that "Sir William Wheler was related to Sir Edmund, seeing he calls him [Sir Edmund] and his son, William, cozen"; and again, "William, son to Sir Edmund, left Sir William most of his land in the country, and Sir William purchased of him that part I possess in Spittleflelds." The daughters of William Wheler, late of Datchet, are mentioned in the will of the 1st Baronet. William, son of Sir Edmund, bap. at Datchet, 28 July 1605, and living at the date of his father's will, 16 December 1633, was apparently buried at Datchet, 13 November 1672, as " William Wheeler, Esq.," though possibly a grandson of Sir Edmund may be thus indicated. Anyhow, it is stated in the Visit. of Warwickshire, 1682, that no male issue of Sir Edmund was then existing.) and his wife Martha (born 1585), daughter of Robert Herrick, of St. Martin's, Leicester, was "a 4th son, born in Holland" (Note: Cokayne 1903, p. 106 notes: Le Neve's MS. Baronetage, where, however, no parentage is given.) probably in 1611. (Note: Cokayne 1903, p. 106 notes: Of the children of John and Martha Wheler, John, baptised 23 August 1607, at St. Martin's, Leicester [Registers of Martin Husingtree, co. Worcester], is mentioned as eldest son in his father's will, proved 13 February 1621. Mary was baptised 20 November 1608, at St. Vedast's, Poster Lane, London, and George was baptised 20 September 1610, at Eton, near Windsor. The assertion that the 1st Baronet (if the son of parents, who did not marry until 6 October 1606) died in his 66th year (in September 1666) must be erroneous, being probably a mistake for his 56th year. The last named John, who entered (and signed as " John Wheeler ") his pedigree in the Visit, of London, 1633–34 (having then one daughter), d.s.p.m. in 1643, before the Baronet.)

In November 1640, Wheler was elected Member of Parliament for Westbury in the Long Parliament, in which he was a member. He was a Lay Member of the Westminster Assembly in 1643. He was knighted some time before 30 January 1649. He sat until 1648 when he was excluded under Pride's Purge. He was sometime of the First Fruits office. (Note: Cokayne 1903, p. 106 quotes: "I remember him to be a comely old gentleman, with a round plump face, a rudy cheerfull countenance adorned with curled grey hair. His Study of bookes he left shew he was a man of study and learning, curious and inquisitive, for they consisted of Greek and Latine, French and Spanish, and some divinity. I found a case where medales had been" (Wheler 1911).) He was knighted at Hampton Court, on 26 August 1657, by the Lord Protector Oliver Cromwell. In 1659 he represented Banffshire in the Third Protectorate Parliament.

In 1660, Wheler was elected MP for Queensborough in the Convention Parliament. He was created a baronet on 11 August 1660, with a special, remainder failing the heirs male of his body, "to Charles Wheeler [rectius Wheler], cosin to the said Sir William and the heires males of the body of the said Sir Charles". (Note: Cokayne 1903, p. 106 notes: Apparently the second of such special remainders (see Cokayne 1903, p. 21, note "c."): although usual in the baronetcies in Scotland, the first English baronetcy with a special remainder was to Sir Henry Browne 1st Baronet of Kiddington).)

Wheler left London on account of the Great Plague of London and went to Derby, where he died on 6 August 1666, at the age of 56. He was buried in All Saints in Derby where there is a monument to him which records his age at death as 66.

Sir William's cousin Charles Wheler succeeded to the baronetcy. However Sir William and Charles Wheler had fallen out, apparently over Charles urging Sir William to execute a settlement of his estates upon Charles (which he considered part of the arrangement for using his influence at court to help secure the baronetcy for Sir William), so instead of doing what Charles wanted, Sir William left the bulk of is estate to others and Charles only received an annual stipend of £120. (Note: Cokayne 1903, p. 106 notes: Much of the information in this article is given by Edward Galton Wheler, great grandson of the 7th Baronet, and the editor of a very interesting Autobiography of the Rev. Sir George Wheler, Prebendary of Durham (Wheler 1911), who, though no relation to the 1st Baronet, succeeded under his will, on the death of the widow, to his estates in Hampshire and Wiltshire, and to a house in Canon Row, Westminster.) (Note: In the Autobiography (Wheler 1911), it is said that "Sir Charles, imprudently pressing Sir William to settle the estate upon him before he died, disobliged Sir William to that degree that he refused to do it, whereupon Sir Charles began to sue Sir William," etc. The 2d Baronet actually brought a suit (unsuccessfully, however) after Lady Wheler's death, to get possession, alleging that "King Charles w^{d} witness that he gave Sir W™ the Baronet Patent upon Sir W's promise to settle his estate on him." There was, however, a charge on the Spitalfields estate, which was devised by Sir William to go with the Baronetcy.(Cokayne 1903, p. 106))

== Family ==
Wheler married Elizabeth, daughter and heir of Michael Cole, of Kensington, Middlesex. She was laundress to Charles I. (Note: Cokayne 1903, p. 106 notes: In Echard's England (vol. ii, p. 639, edit. 1718) it is stated that early in the rebellion the King confided to her a casket, which-she restored to him the night before his execution. Betham 1802, p. 160 notes that Lady Wheler was the laundress to the royal family. In Melvil's Memoirs, and in Carte's History of England, it is related that King Charles I, at the beginning of his troubles, delivered to Lady Wheler a casket, which she was to take care of, and to return it to the king on the delivery of a ring. The evening before the king was beheaded, the ring was sent to Lady Wheler, and the casket delivered to the messenger.) They had no children. She died in the country, but was buried 20 September 1670, at St. Margaret's, Westminster.

== Notes ==
Parliament of England
Preceded by Sir Thomas Penyston, 1st Baronet; John Ashe	Member of Parliament for Westbury; 1640–1648; With: John Ashe	Succeeded by Not represented in Rump Parliament
Baronetage of England
New creation	Baronet (of the City of Westminster); 1660–1666	Succeeded by Charles Wheler
