= Sir Thomas Palmer, 1st Baronet =

English knight and politician

Arms of Palmer of Wingham: Or, two bars gules each charged with three trefoils of the first in chief a greyhound currant sable

Sir Thomas Palmer, 1st Baronet (1540–1626), 'the Travailer,’ was an English knight and politician.

== Life ==
Thomas Palmer was the third son of Sir Henry Palmer of Wingham, Kent, by his wife Jane, daughter of Sir Richard Windebank of Guisnes. He was nephew of Sir Thomas Palmer (died 1553), and of the Abbess Katherine Palmer of Syon Abbey. He was High Sheriff of Kent in 1595. In the following year, he went on the expedition to Cádiz, when he was knighted.

He was a Member of the Parliament of England in 1586 and 1601 for Arundel. He was created baronet on 29 June 1621.

He died on 2 January 1625–6, aged 85, and was buried at Wingham. He had married Margaret, daughter of John Pooley of Badley, Suffolk, who died in August 1625, aged 85. Of his three sons, all knighted, Sir Thomas died before his father, and was himself father of Herbert Palmer. The second son, Sir Roger, was master of the household to Charles I, and the third son, Sir James, was a courtier, MP and Chancellor of the Order of the Garter.

== Works ==
In 1606 Palmer published An Essay of the Meanes how to make our Travailes into forraine Countries the more profitable and honourable, London,. Here he discussed the advantages of foreign travel, and political and commercial principles which the traveller should understand. The book is dated from Wingham, where the author is said to have kept 60 hospitable Christmases without intermission.

== Others of the name ==
The 'Travailer' must be distinguished from Thomas Palmer or Palmar, a Roman Catholic scholar, who graduated B.A. from Brasenose College, Oxford, in 1553, but who subsequently became a primary scholar of St. John's College, and was in 1563 appointed principal of Gloucester Hall. He was a zealous catholic, and, after a steady refusal to conform, he had in 1564 to retire from his headship to his estates in Essex, where persecution is said to have followed him. Wood describes him as an excellent orator, and 'the best of his time for a Ciceronian style'.

Baronetage of England
New creation	Baronet (of Wingham); 1621–1625	Succeeded by Thomas Palmer
