= William Harrison (MP) =

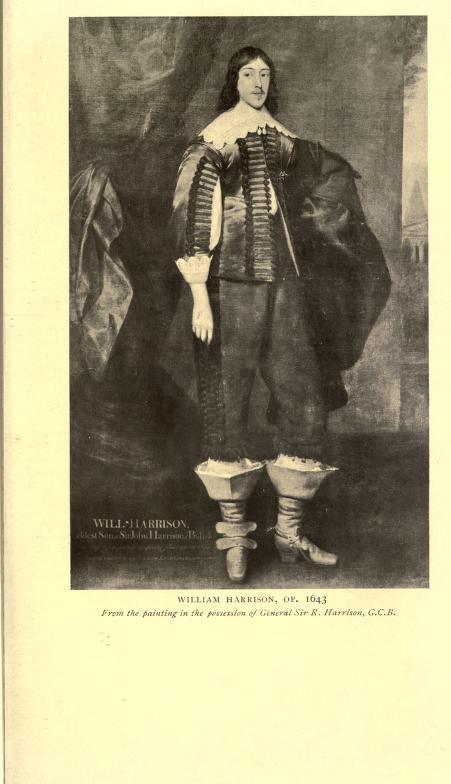
William Harrison

William Harrison (baptised 1619 – 1643) was an English Member of Parliament and Royalist soldier.

He was the son of Sir John Harrison, by his first wife, and sister of the memoirist Ann, Lady Fanshawe. He graduated from St Catharine's College, Cambridge early in 1638, having been there about a year since matriculation, and having joined Gray's Inn in October 1637. His sister recorded his selection (for Queenborough) "around 1641" at the beginning of the Long Parliament. Queenborough on the coast of Kent was a rotten borough in the fashion of the 17th century: one of its MPs would be nominated, by the normal convention, by the future Philip Herbert, 4th Earl of Pembroke, from 1616, as Constable of the Castle.

Harrison was quite prominent in the first session of the Long Parliament, as noted by Simonds D'Ewes. His father, an important financier, agreed to give up £50,000 to the parliament, and Harrison was nominated to receive it. When Charles I of England went to Nottingham in August 1642, to raise the Royal Standard—the event that marked the outbreak of the First English Civil War—Harrison accompanied him. Parliament retaliated against his father.

On 24 June 1643 Harrison was expelled from the House of Commons. Days later, he died of an injury caused by a fall with his horse, in Oxfordshire, in a skirmish with parliamentary forces under the Earl of Essex. He was buried in Exeter College Chapel, according to his sister's memoirs; but in the church of St Peter the Great, according to the editor of the 1907 edition.
