= Robert Poley (English MP) =

English Member of Parliament

Robert Poley or Pooley (c. 1600 – 1627), of Boxted, Suffolk, was an English Member of Parliament.

He was the eldest son of Sir William Poley of Boxted, Suffolk and Anne, one of the daughters of Sir Robert Jermyn of Rushbrooke. He entered Clare College, Cambridge in 1617 with his cousin Robert Jermyn. The following year the two cousin obtained a licence to travel abroad for three years. He was a Member (MP) of the Parliament of England for Queenborough in 1624 and 1626 through the influence of Philip Herbert, 4th Earl of Pembroke. If he made any contribution to either parliament, it is not recorded.

He was one of the many casualties of the Duke of Buckingham's attempt to raise the Siege of Saint-Martin-de-Ré in 1627. He died unmarried and on his father's death the estate passed to his younger brother William.
