= Queenborough (constituency) =

Former parliamentary constituency in the United Kingdom

- Former borough constituency for the House of Commons

1572–1832
- Seats: Two

The constituency of Queenborough was a rotten borough situated on the Isle of Sheppey in Kent.

From 1572 until it was abolished by the Reform Act 1832, it returned two Members of Parliament. The franchise was vested in the freemen of the town, of whom there were more than 300. Its electorate was therefore one of largest of the 56 boroughs that were abolished. Most freemen, however, were non resident.

A small town in Kent, England, which grew as a port near the Thames Estuary. It was formerly a municipal borough in the Faversham parliamentary division of Kent, and is two miles south of Sheerness on the Isle of Sheppey, nearby the westward entrance to the Swale, where it joins the River Medway. It is now in the Sittingbourne and Sheppey parliamentary constituency and governed by Swale Borough Council and Queenborough Town Council.

== Members of Parliament ==
=== 1572-1640 ===
Parliament	First member	Second member
1571	John Brooke alias Cobham	John Parker
1572 (May)	John Brooke alias Cobham	William Butler, died and replaced Dec 1580 by Sir Humphrey Gilbert
1584 (Nov)	John Brooke alias Cobham	William Parry, expelled from the House and replaced Feb 1585 by Sir Edward Hoby
1586 (Sep)	Sir Edward Hoby	Michael Sondes
1588	William Boys	Michael Sondes
1593	John Brooke alias Cobham	John Baynham
1597	Sir George Carew	Michael Sondes
1601	Sir Michael Sondes	Nicholas Troughton
1604	Sir Edward Stafford	Michael Sondes
1605	Sir Edward Stafford	Richard Wright
1614	Roger Palmer	Robert Hatton
1621-1622	James Palmer	William Frowde
1624	Roger Palmer	Robert Pooley
1625	Roger Palmer	Sir Edward Hales
1626	Roger Palmer	Robert Pooley
1628	Roger Palmer	Sir John Hales
1629–1640	No Parliaments summoned	

=== 1640-1832 ===
Year	First member	First party	Second member	Second party
April 1640	Sir Edward Hales	Parliamentarian	John Wolstenholme	
November 1640	Sir Edward Hales	Parliamentarian	William Harrison	Royalist
June 1643	Sir Edward Hales	Parliamentarian	Harrison disabled from sitting - seat vacant	
1645	Sir Edward Hales	Parliamentarian	Sir Michael Livesey	
April 1648	Hales disabled from sitting		Sir Michael Livesey	
1648	Augustine Garland		Sir Michael Livesey	
1653	Queenborough was unrepresented in the Barebones Parliament			
1654	Augustine Garland		Queenborough had only one seat in the First and Second Parliaments of the Protectorate	
1656	Gabriel Livesey		Queenborough had only one seat in the First and Second Parliaments of the Protectorate	
January 1659	Thomas Bayles		Hon. James Herbert	
May 1659	Augustine Garland		One seat vacant	
April 1660	Sir William Wheler		Hon. James Herbert	
1661	Sir Edward Hales		Hon. James Herbert	
1677	Sir Edward Hales		James Herbert	
January 1681	Sir Edward Hales		William Glanville	
February 1681	Gerard Gore		William Glanville	
1685	Sir John Godwin		Caleb Banks	
1689	Robert Crawford		James Herbert (the younger)	
1690	Robert Crawford		Sir John Banks	
1695	Robert Crawford		Caleb Banks	
1696	Robert Crawford		Thomas King	
1705	Rear-Admiral Sir John Jennings		Thomas King	
1708	Rear-Admiral Sir John Jennings		Henry Withers	
1710	Colonel Thomas King		James Herbert (the third)	
1713	Colonel Thomas King		Charles Fotherby	
1715	Colonel Thomas King		Philip Jennings	
1722	Vice Admiral James Littleton		Lieutenant Colonel John Cope	
1723	Captain Lord Forbes		Lieutenant Colonel John Cope	
1727	Sprig Manesty		John Crowley	
1728	Sprig Manesty		Captain Sir George Saunders	
1729	Richard Evans		Captain Sir George Saunders	
1735	Richard Evans		Lord Archibald Hamilton	
1741	Richard Evans		Thomas Newnham	
1754	Sir Charles Frederick		Captain Sir Peircy Brett	
1774	Sir Charles Frederick		Sir Walter Rawlinson	
1784	John Clater Aldridge		Captain George Bowyer	
1790	Gibbs Crawfurd		Richard Hopkins	
1793	Augustus Rogers	Tory	Richard Hopkins	
1794	John Sargent	Tory	Richard Hopkins	
1796	John Sargent	Tory	Evan Nepean	Tory
1802	John Prinsep	Whig	George Peter Moore	Whig
March 1806	John Prinsep	Whig	Sir Samuel Romilly	Whig
October 1806	William Frankland	Whig	Sir Samuel Romilly	Whig
1807	Joseph Hunt	Tory	Hon. John Villiers	Tory
1810	Richard Wellesley	Tory	Hon. John Villiers	Tory
January 1812	Sir Robert Moorsom	Tory	Hon. John Villiers	Tory
October 1812	Sir Robert Moorsom	Tory	John Osborn	Tory
1818	Sir Robert Moorsom	Tory	Hon. Edmund Phipps	Tory
1820	Hon. John Villiers	Tory	George Peter Holford	Tory
1824	Lord Frederick Cavendish-Bentinck	Whig	George Peter Holford	Tory
1826	The Lord Downes	Tory	John Capel	Tory
August 1830	William Holmes	Tory	Sir Philip Charles Henderson Durham	Tory
December 1830	John Capel	Tory	Thomas Gladstone	Tory
1831	John Capel	Tory	Lt General Sir John Colquhoun Grant	Tory
1832	Constituency abolished			
