= Augustine Garland =

English lawyer and one of the Regicides of King Charles I of England

Augustine Garland (born c. 1603) was an English lawyer, and one of the Regicides of King Charles I of England.

== Biography ==
Garland was educated at Emmanuel College, Cambridge, and Lincoln's Inn. He was M.P. for Queenborough in 1648. He presided over the committee to consider method of the king's trial, and in 1649 signed death-warrant. In 1660, after the Restoration, he was condemned to death, but suffered only confiscation of his property and imprisonment. He was recorded to have been sentenced to transportation to Tangier (which had become a British possession as a dowry for Charles II) in 1664 but there is no evidence the sentence was carried out.
