= List of MPs in the English parliament in 1645 and after =

This is a list of members of Parliament (MPs) in the second half of the Long Parliament which began in the reign of King Charles I and continued into the Commonwealth.

The fifth and last Parliament of Charles I began at Westminster 3 November 1640 and continued sitting until 20 April 1653, when it was dissolved. By 1645, a considerable proportion of the house had been removed, being expelled for various reasons, disabled for supporting the King, killed in the Civil War or lost through natural causes. Their seats were left vacant for several years and were filled by new elections after around 1645, so that new MPs supplemented those that had survived since 1640.

In December 1648, the army imposed its will on parliament and large numbers of MPs were excluded under Pride's Purge, creating the Rump Parliament. Many who were not officially excluded did not participate in the affairs of the house. Although the parliament was dissolved in 1653 and four intervening parliaments were called, the Long Parliament was reconvened in 1659 for another dissolution.

This list contains details of the MPs in the house after 1645. For the original membership of the House of Commons in 1640 see List of MPs elected to the English parliament in 1640 (November). There is also a list of MPs not excluded from the English parliament in 1648.

== List of constituencies and MPs ==
Oliver Cromwell (Cambridge)

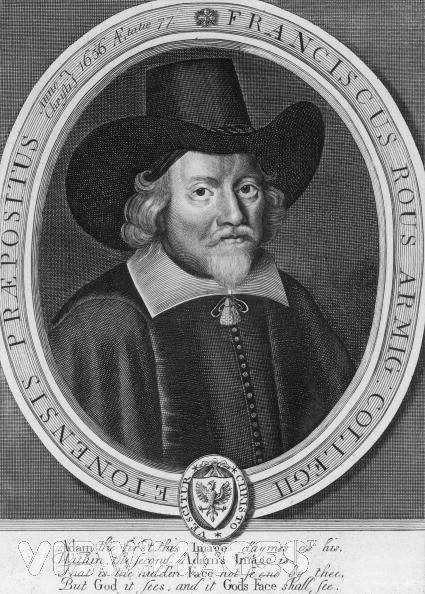
Francis Rous (Truro)

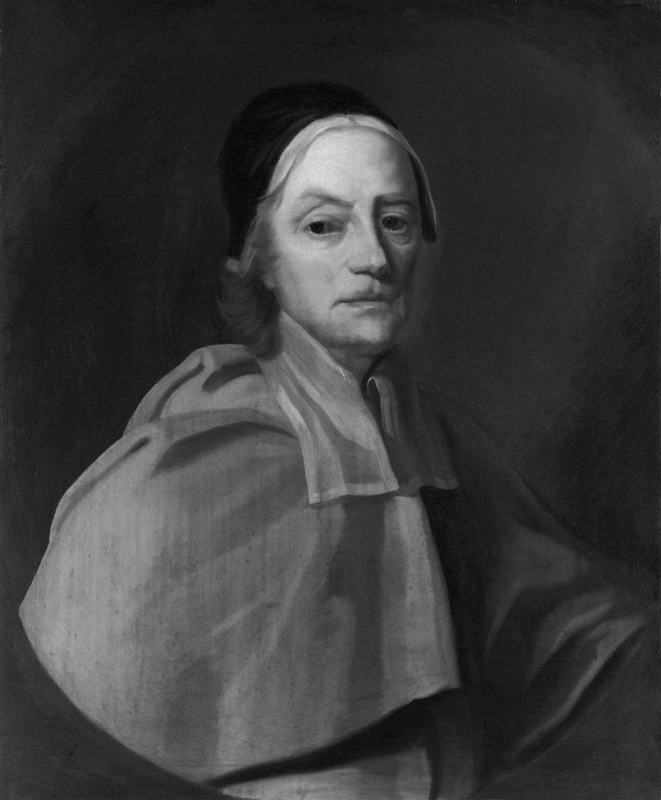
Sir John Maynard (Totnes)

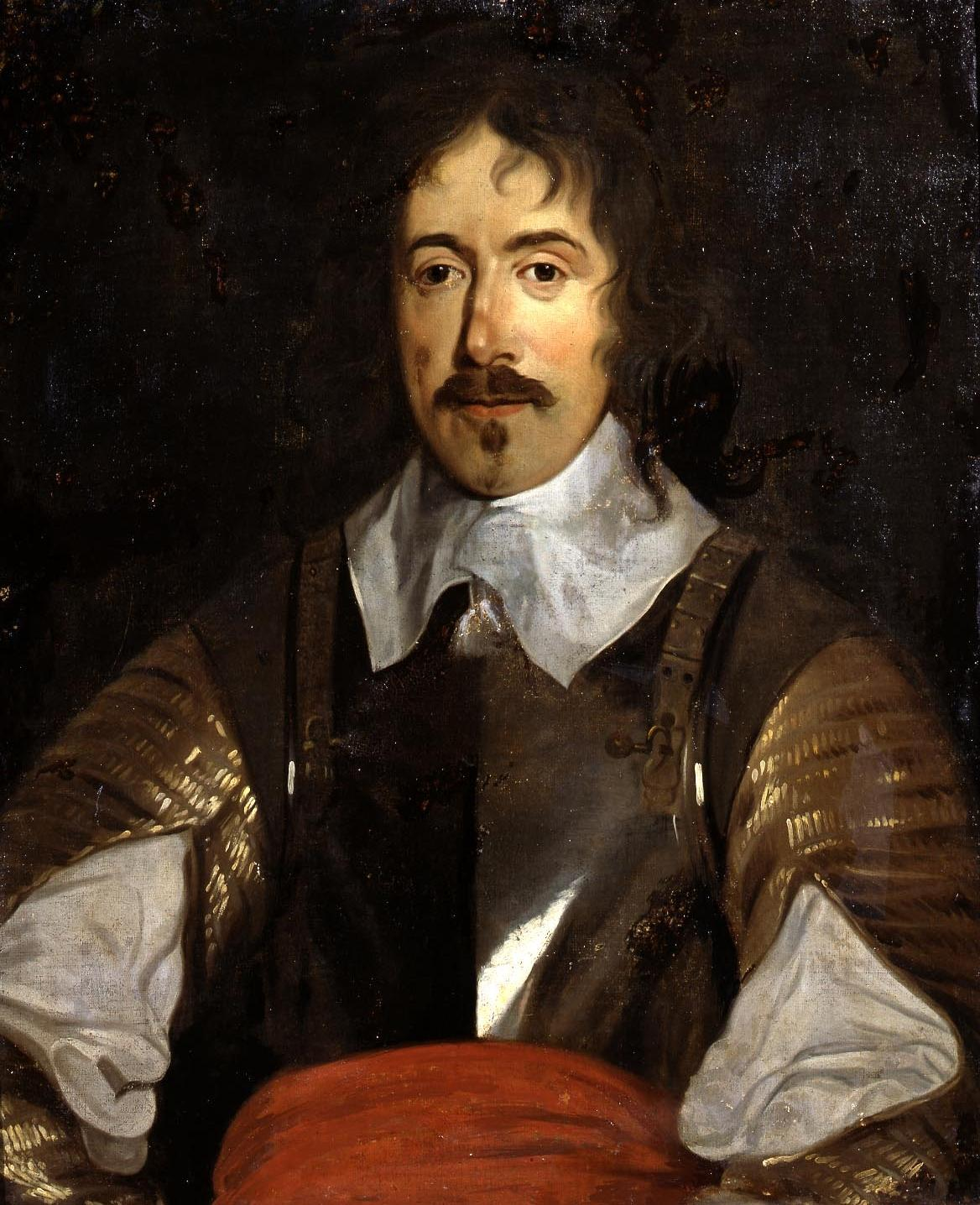
Denzil Holles, 1st Baron Holles of Ifield (Dorchester)

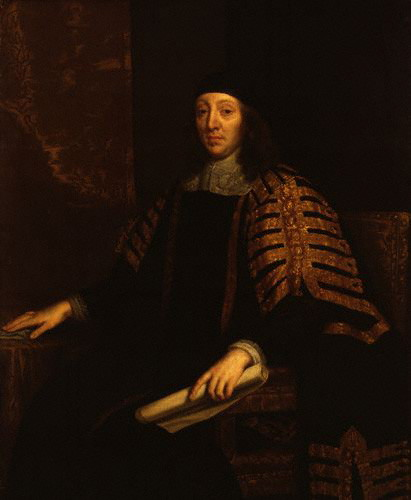
Sir Harbottle Grimston (Colchester)

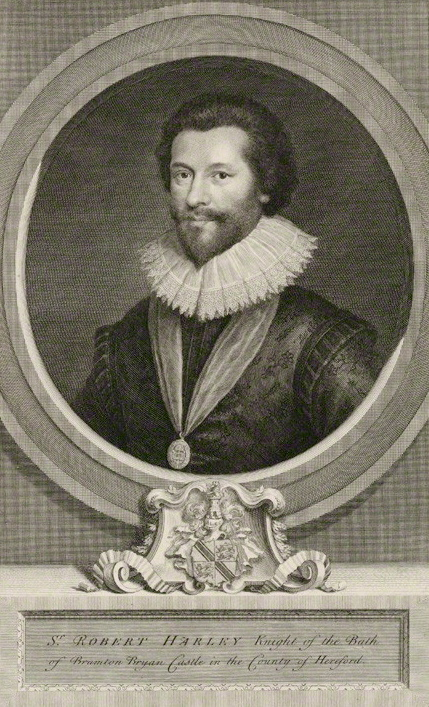
Sir Robert Harley (Herefordshire)

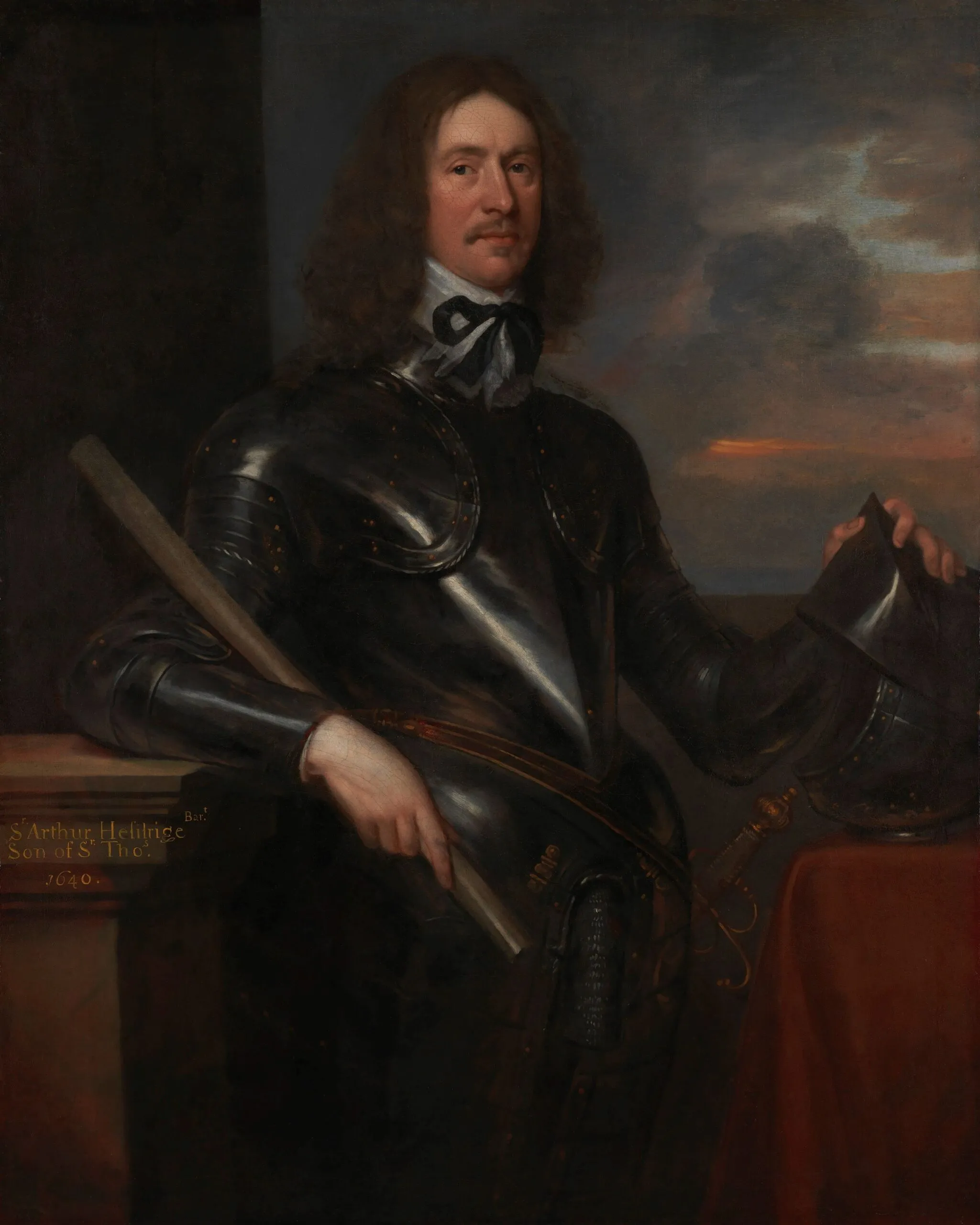
Sir Arthur Haselrig (Leicestershire)

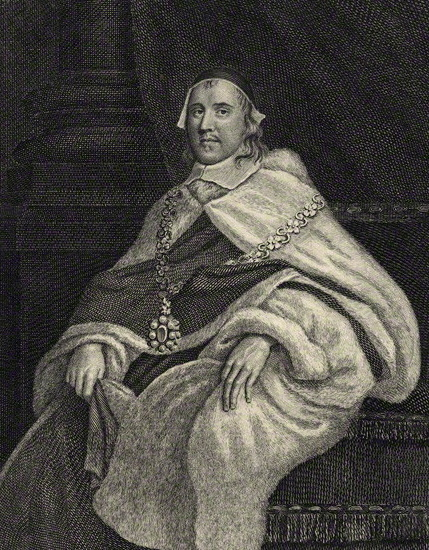
Sir John Glynne (Westminster)

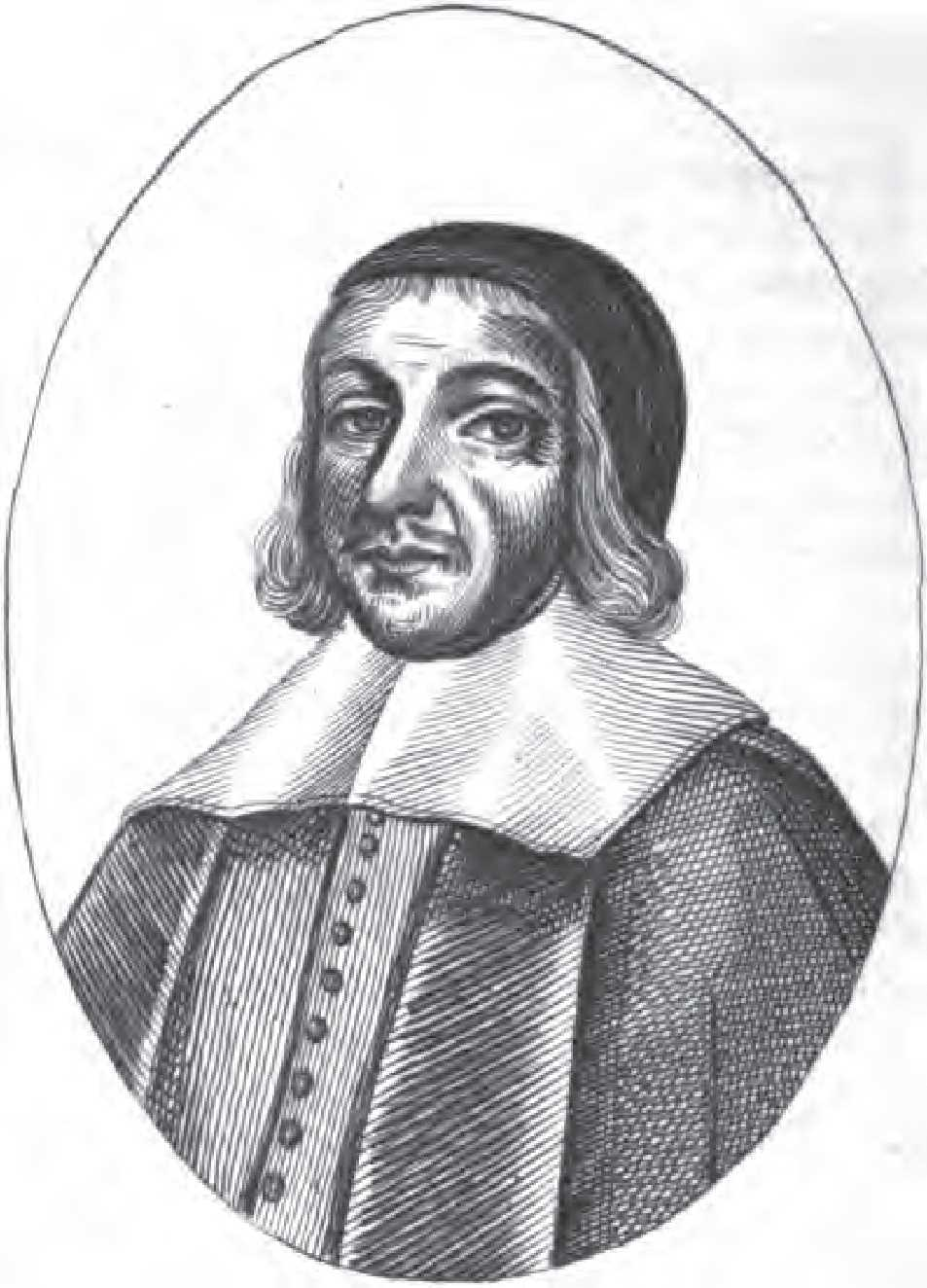
Miles Corbett (Yarmouth)

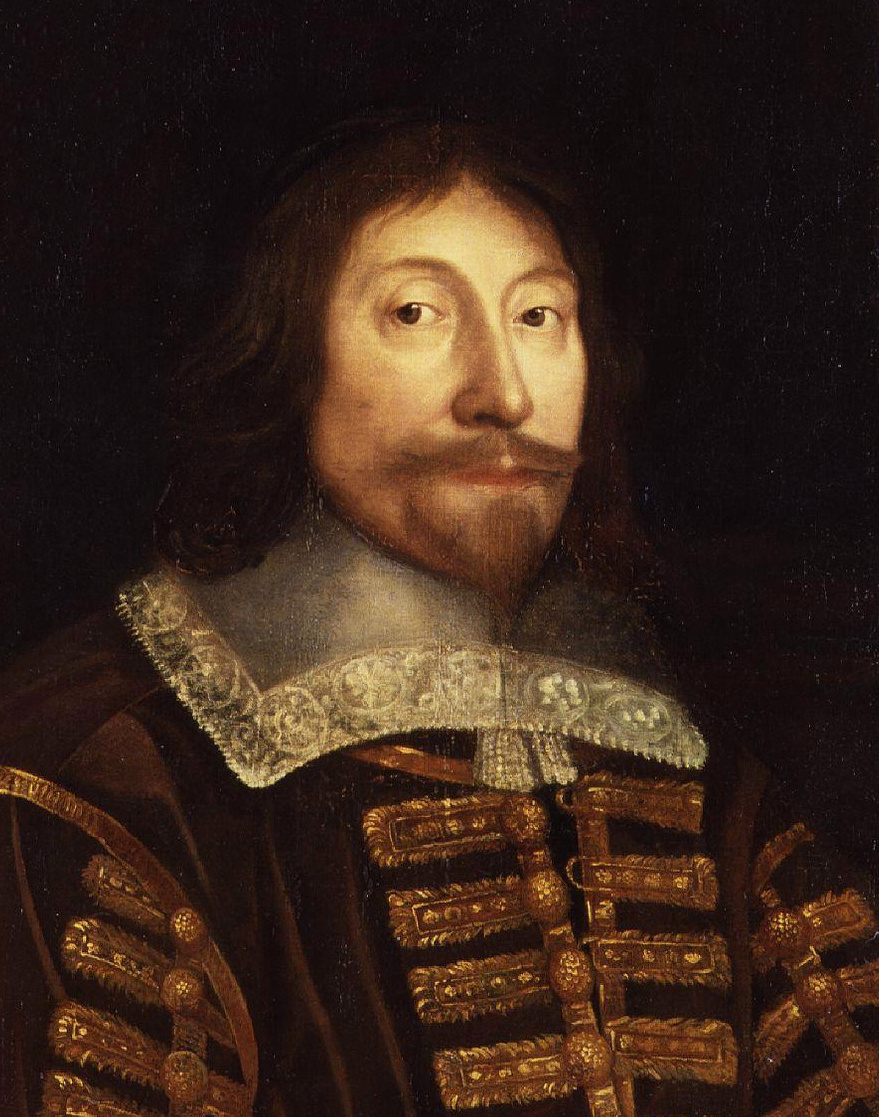
William Lenthall (Speaker)

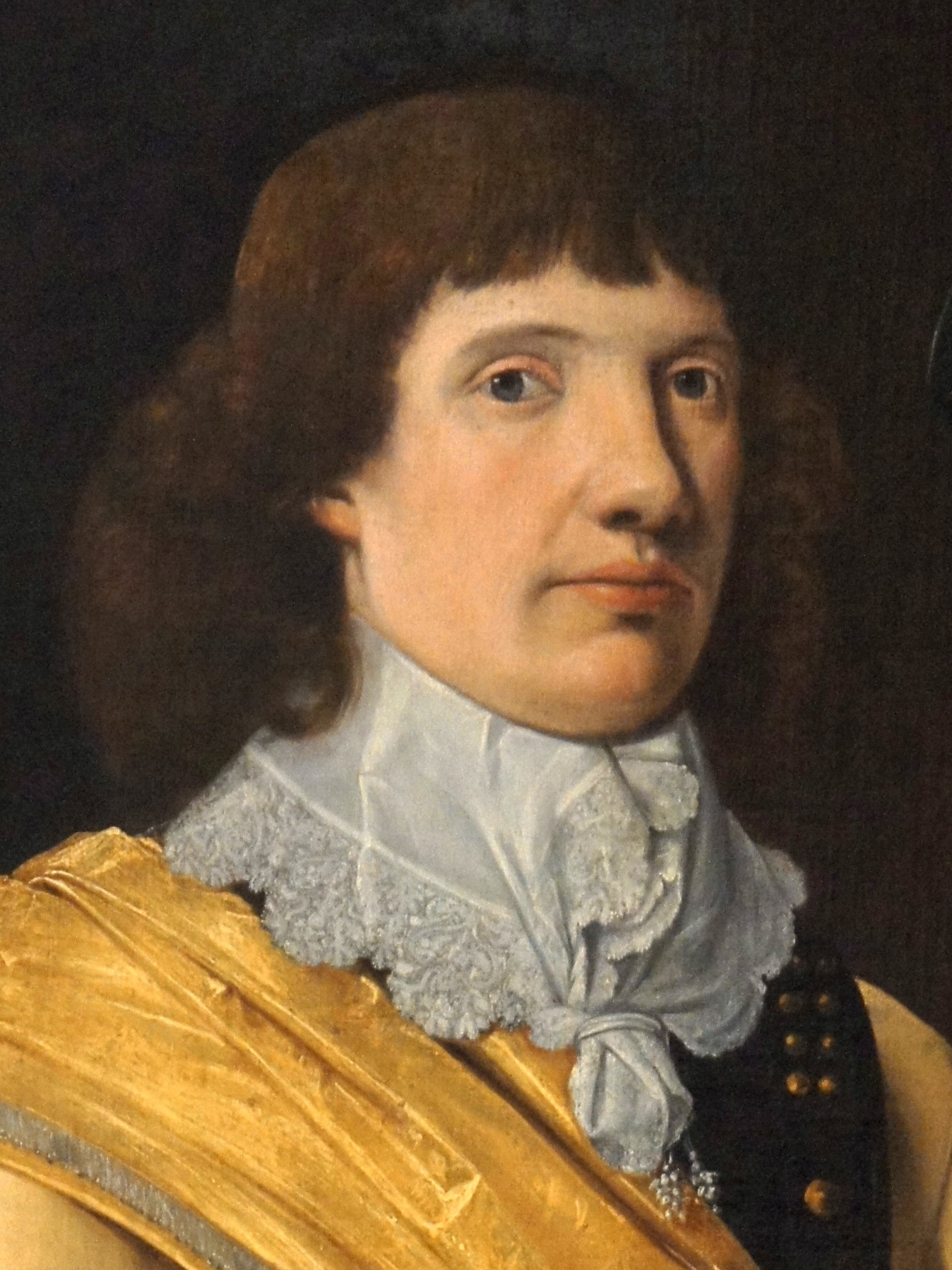
Nathaniel Fiennes (Banbury)

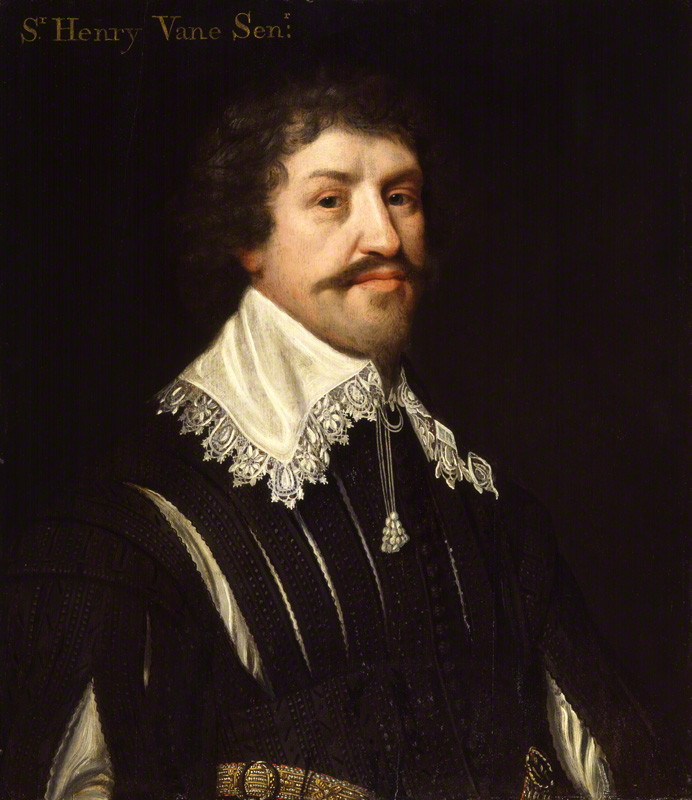
Sir Henry Vane (Wilton)

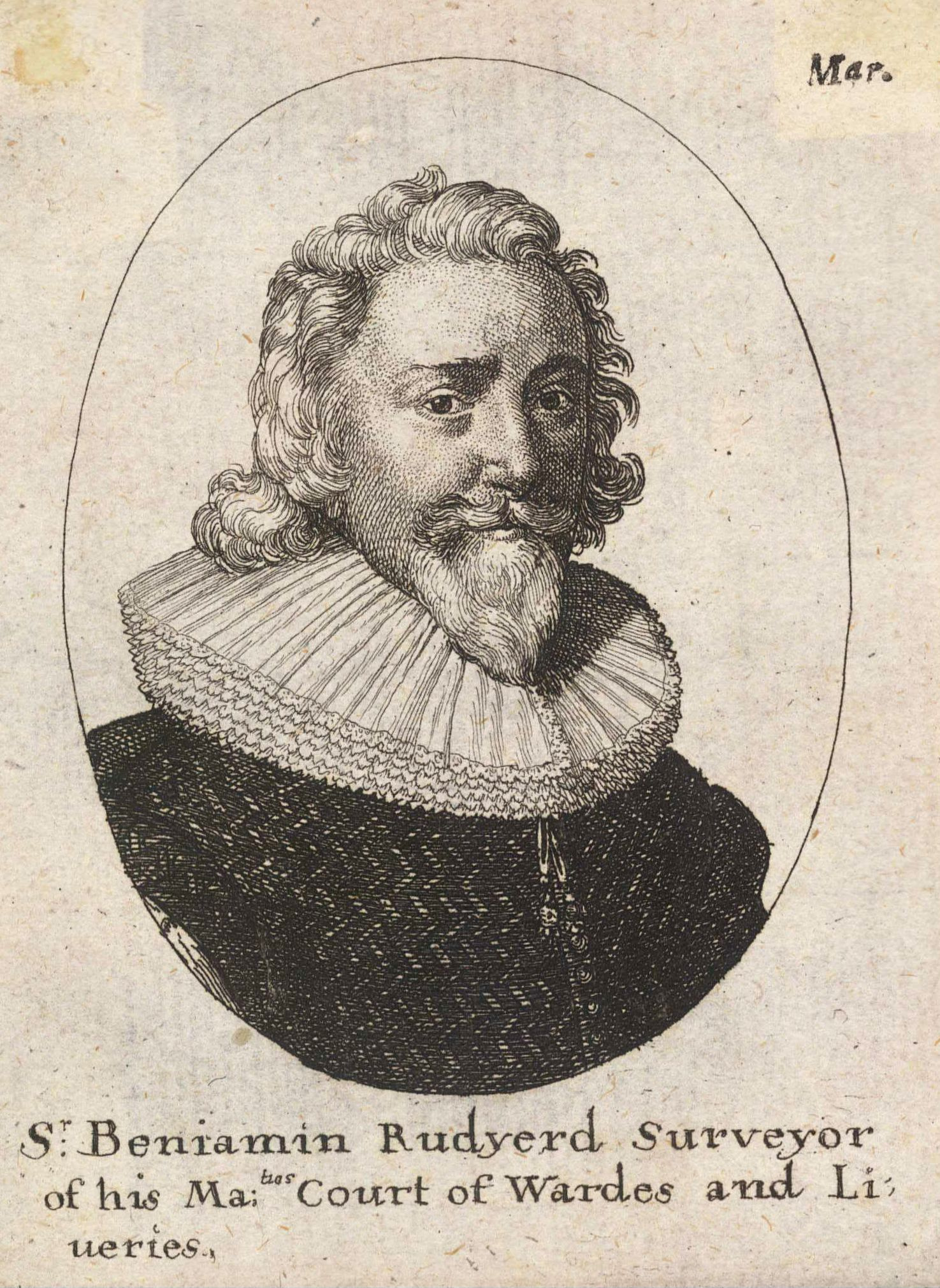
Benjamin Rudyerd (Wilton)

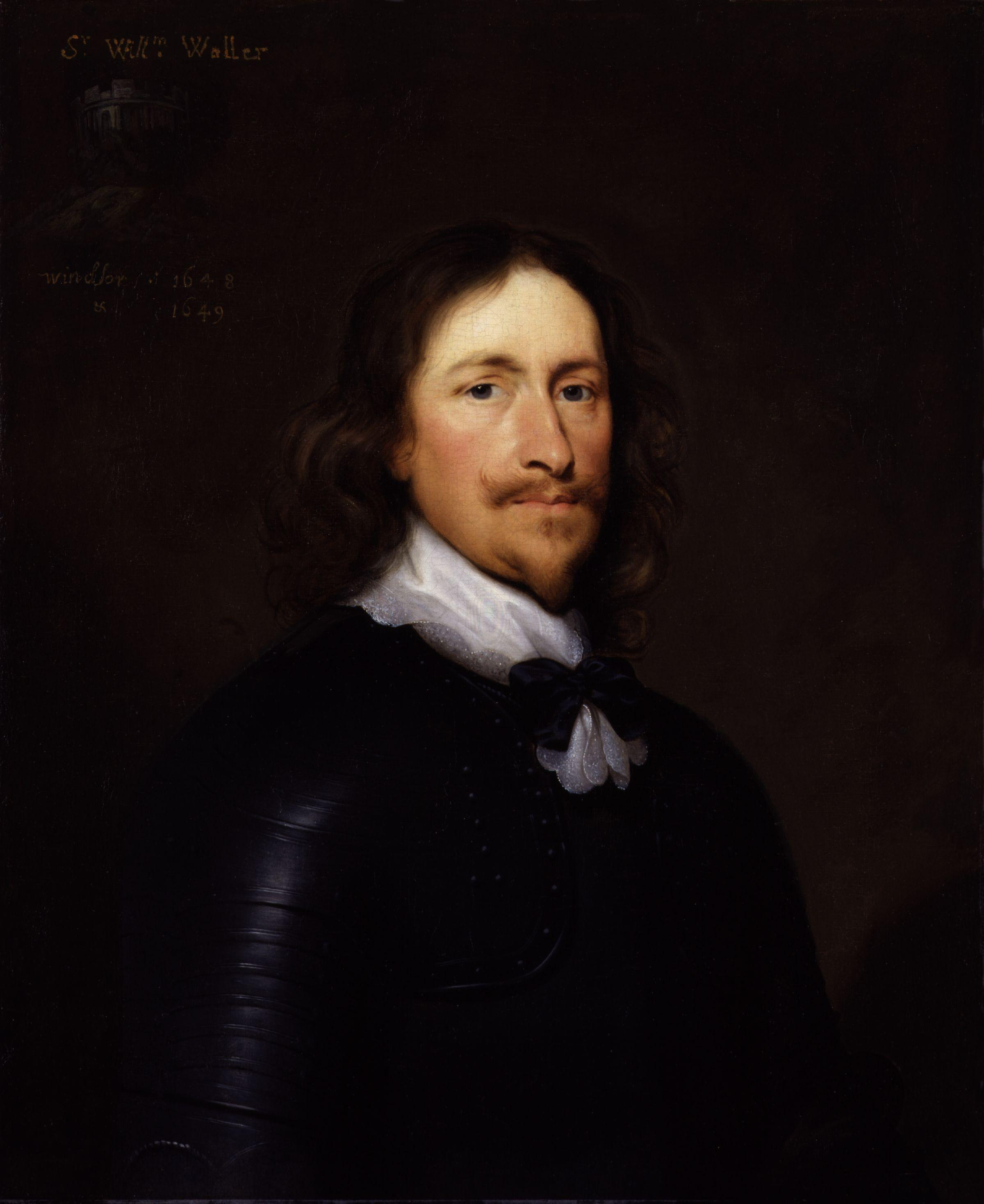
William Waller (Andover)

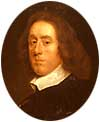
Henry Vane (Hull)

=== Bedfordshire ===
Constituency	Members	Notes
Bedfordshire	Roger Burgoyne; Sir Oliver Luke	Luke secluded in Pride's Purge 1648; Burgoyne possibly secluded
Bedford	Sir Beauchamp St John; Sir Samuel Luke	
=== Berkshire ===
Constituency	Members	Notes
Berkshire	Henry Marten; Sir Francis Pile Bt	Pile died before February 1648
Windsor	Cornelius Holland; Richard Winwood	Winwood secluded in Pride's Purge
Reading	Tanfield Vachell; Daniel Blagrave	
Abingdon	John Ball	Ball died 1648 - replaced 1649 by Henry Neville
Wallingford	Edmund Dunch; Robert Packer	Packer secluded in Pride's Purge
=== Buckinghamshire ===
Constituency	Members	Notes
Buckinghamshire	George Fleetwood; Edmund West	
Buckingham	Sir Peter Temple, 2nd Baronet; John Dormer	
Wycombe	Richard Browne; Thomas Lane	Both secluded in Pride's Purge
Aylesbury	Thomas Scot; Simon Mayne	
Amersham	Francis Drake; William Drake	Francis Drake secluded in Pride's Purge; William Drake possibly secluded
Wendover	Richard Ingoldsby; Thomas Harrison	
Marlow	Bulstrode Whitelocke; Peregrine Hoby	Hoby secluded in Pride's Purge
=== Cambridgeshire ===
Constituency	Members	Notes
Cambridgeshire	Sir Dudley North Bt. Francis Russell	North secluded in Pride's Purge
Cambridge University	Henry Lucas; Nathaniel Bacon	Lucas secluded in Pride's Purge
Cambridge	Oliver Cromwell; John Lowry	
=== Cheshire ===
Constituency	Members	Notes
Cheshire	Sir William Brereton, 1st Baronet; George Booth	
City of Chester	William Edwards; John Ratcliffe	Edward secluded in Pride's Purge
=== Cornwall ===
Constituency	Members	Notes
Cornwall	Nicholas Trefusis; Hugh Boscawen	Trefusis possibly secluded in Pride's Purge; Boscowen not recorded after Pride's Purge
Launceston	Thomas Gewen; John Harris	Both secluded in Pride's Purge
Liskeard	George Kekewich; Thomas Povey	Povey secluded in Pride's Purge; Kekewich possibly secluded
Lostwithiel	John Maynard; Francis Holles	Holles secluded in Pride's Purge; Maynard not recorded as sitting after Pride's Purge
Truro	John Rolle; Francis Rous	Rolle died 1648
Bodmin	Anthony Nicholl; Thomas Waller	Waller secluded in Pride's Purge; Nichols not recorded after Pride's Purge
Helston	John Penrose; John Thomas	Thomas secluded in Pride's Purge; Penrose not recorded after Pride's Purge
Saltash	John Thynne; Henry Wills	Thynne secluded in Pride's Purge; Wills possible secluded
Camelford	William Say; Gregory Clement	
Grampound	Sir John Trevor; James Campbell	Campbell secluded in Pride's Purge
Eastlow	Francis Buller; John Moyle	Buller secluded in Pride's Purge
Westlow	Thomas Arundell; John Arundell	Thomas Arundell died 1648; John Arundell possibly secluded in Pride's Purge
Penryn	John Bampfylde	Bampfylde possibly secluded in Pride's Purge
Tregoney	John Carew; Sir Thomas Trevor	
Bossiney	Sir Christopher Yelverton; Lionel Copley	Copley secluded in Pride's Purge; Yelverton not recorded after Pride's Purge
St Ives	Henry Rainsford; John Fielder	
Fowey	John Upton; Nicholas Gould	Gould died 1648
St Germans	Benjamin Valentine; John Moyle jun.	Moyle died 1646
Mitchel	Edward Lord Clinton; Charles Lord Kerr	Clinton secluded in Pride's Purge; Willis gives Charles Lord Rochester
Newport	Sir Philip Perceval; Nicholas Leach	Both died in 1647 – Successors William Prynne and Alexander Pym secluded in Pride's Purge
St Mawes	Richard Erisey; William Priestley	Priestley secluded in Pride's Purge
Callington	Carew Raleigh; Thomas Dacres	Both secluded in Pride's Purge
=== Cumberland ===
Constituency	Members	Notes
Cumberland	William Armine; Richard Tolson	Tolson possibly secluded in Pride's Purge
Carlisle	Richard Barwis; Thomas Cholmley	Barwis died in 1648
Cockermouth	Sir John Hippisley; Francis Allen	
=== Derbyshire ===
Constituency	Members	Notes
Derbyshire	Sir John Curzon Bt; Sir John Coke	Curzon secluded in Pride's Purge
Derby	Nathaniel Hallowes; Thomas Gell	
=== Devon ===
Constituency	Members	Notes
Devon	Sir Nicholas Martin; Sir Samuel Rolle	Rolle died, replaced by William Morice; Martyn and Morice secluded in Pride's Purge
Exeter	Simon Snow; Samuel Clark	Snow secluded in Pride's Purge
Totnes	Oliver St John; John Maynard	
Plymouth	Sir John Yonge; John Waddon	Waddons secluded in Pride's Purge; Young possibly secluded
Barnstaple	Philip Skippon; John Dodderidge	Dodderidge secluded in Pride's Purge
Plympton Erle	Hugh Potter; Christopher Martyn	
Tavistock	Edmund Fowell; Elisha Crimes	Fowell and Crimes possibly both secluded in Pride's Purge
Clifton Dartmouth Hardness	Samuel Brown; Thomas Boone	Browne possibly secluded in Pride's Purge
Bere Alston	Francis Drake; Charles Pym	Pym secluded in Pride's Purge
Tiverton	John Elford; Robert Shapcote	Shapcot possibly secluded in Pride's Purge; Elford not recorded after Pride's Purge
Ashburton	Sir John Northcote; Sir Edmund Fowell	Northcote and Fowell both possibly secluded in Pride's Purge
Honiton	Walter Yonge; Charles Vaughan	Vaughan secluded in Pride's Purge
Okehampton	Edward Thomas; Laurence Whitacre	Thomas secluded in Pride's Purge
=== Dorset ===
Constituency	Members	Notes
Dorset	John Browne; Sir Thomas Trenchard	Trenchard not recorded after Pride's Purge
Poole	John Pyne; George Skutt	Skutt secluded in Pride's Purge
Dorchester	Denzil Holles; Denis Bond	Holles disabled 27 January 1648 but restored 8 June 1648. He did not sit after Pride's Purge
Lyme Regis	Edmund Prideaux; Richard Rose	Rose not recorded after Pride's Purge
Weymouth	Matthew Allen; Sir Walter Erle	Allen and Erle both secluded in Pride's Purge
Melcombe	William Sydenham; John Bond	Sydenham and Bond possibly secluded in Pride's Purge
Bridport	Roger Hill; Thomas Ceeley	Ceeley possibly secluded in Pride's Purge
Shaftesbury	John Fry; John Bingham	
Wareham	John Trenchard; Thomas Earl	Erle secluded in Pride's Purge
Corfe Castle	Giles Green; Francis Chettel	Green secluded in Pride's Purge. Chettel not recorded after Pride's Purge
=== Essex ===
Constituency	Members	Notes
Essex	Sir Martin Lumley; Sir William Masham Bt	Lumley secluded in Pride's Purge
Colchester	Harbottle Grimston (junior); John Sayer	Grimston secluded in Pride's Purge. Sayer not recorded after Pride's Purge
Maldon	Sir Henry Mildmay; Sir John Clotworthy	Clotworthy disabled 27 January 1648 but restored 8 June 1648. He was secluded in Pride's Purge
Harwich	Harbottle Grimston (senior); Sir Thomas Cheek	Grimston died 1648 and replaced by Capel Luckyn who was secluded in Pride's Purge
=== Gloucestershire ===
Constituency	Members	Notes
Gloucestershire	Nathaniel Stephens; Sir John Seymour	Seymour secluded
Gloucester	Thomas Pury; John Lenthall	
Cirencester	Sir Thomas Fairfax; Nathaniel Rich	Fairfax not recorded after Pride's Purge
Tewkesbury	Edward Stephens; John Stephens	Edward Stephens died or was secluded in Pride's Purge
=== Hampshire ===
Constituency	Members	Notes
Hampshire	Richard Norton	
Winchester	John Lisle; Nicholas Love	
Southampton	George Gallop; Edward Exton	
Portsmouth	Edward Boote; Edward Dowse	Dowce died 1648; Boote not recorded after Pride's Purge
Yarmouth	Viscount L'Isle; Sir John Leigh	Leigh excluded in Pride's Purge
Petersfield	Sir William Lewis; William Uvedale	
Newport al. Medina	Henry Worsley; William Stevens	Worsley excluded in Pride's Purge
Stockbridge	William Hevingham; William Jephson	Jepson not recorded after Pride's Purge
Newtown	Sir John Barrington; John Bulkeley	Barrington and Bulkeley both excluded in Pride's Purge
Christchurch	John Kempe; Richard Edwards	
Whitchurch	Sir Thomas Jervoise; Thomas Hussey	
Lymington	John Button; Henry Campion	Button excluded in Pride's Purge; Campion not recorded after Pride's Purge
Andover	Robert Wallop; Sir William Waller	
=== Herefordshire ===
Constituency	Members	Notes
Herefordshire	Sir Robert Harley; Edward Harley	Both excluded in Pride's Purge
Hereford	Edmund Weaver; Bennet Hoskyns	Hoskyns possibly secluded in Pride's Purge
Weobley	Robert Andrews; William Crowther	
Leominster	John Birch	Birch secluded
=== Hertfordshire ===
Constituency	Members	Notes
Hertfordshire	Sir William Lytton; Sir Thomas Dacres	Lytton and Dacres both secluded in Pride's Purge.
St Albans	Richard Jennings; Edward Wingate	Jennings and Wingate both secluded in Pride's Purge
Hertford	Viscount Cranborne; William Leman	Cranborne not recorded after Pride's Purge
=== Huntingdonshire ===
Constituency	Members	Notes
Huntingdonshire	Valentine Walton; Edward Montagu	
Huntingdon	Abraham Burrell	
=== Kent (see also Cinque Ports) ===
Constituency	Members	Notes
Kent	Augustine Skinner; John Boys	Boys possibly secluded in Pride's Purge
Canterbury	Sir Edward Masters; John Nutt	Masters died
Rochester	Sir Thomas Walsingham; Richard Lee	Lee possibly secluded in Pride's Purge
Maidstone	Thomas Twisden; Sir Humfrey Tufton	Tufton secluded in Pride's Purge
Queenborough	Sir Michael Livesey; Augustine Garland	
=== Lancashire ===
Constituency	Members	Notes
Lancashire	Ralph Assheton; Sir Richard Hoghton, 3rd Baronet	
Lancaster	Sir Robert Bindlosse, 1st Baronet; Thomas Fell	Bindlosse possibly secluded in Pride's Purge
Preston	Richard Shuttleworth; William Langton	Shuttleworth possibly secluded in Pride's Purge; Langton not recorded after Pride's Purge
Newton	William Ashurst; Peter Brooke	Brooke secluded in Pride's Purge
Wigan	John Holcroft; Alexander Rigby	Holcroft excluded in Pride's Purge;
Clitheroe	Sir Ralph Assheton; Richard Shuttleworth jun.	Shuttleworth died 1648
Liverpool	John Moore; Sir Richard Wynn, 2nd Baronet	
=== Leicestershire ===
Constituency	Members	Notes
Leicestershire	Sir Arthur Hesilrige; Henry Smith	Willis gives Sir Edward Smith for Hesilrige
Leicester	Lord Grey of Groby; Peter Temple	
=== Lincolnshire ===
Constituency	Members	Notes
Lincolnshire	Sir John Wray; Sir Edward Ayscough	Ayscough secluded in Pride's Purge; Wray possibly secluded
Lincoln	Thomas Grantham; Thomas Lister	
Boston	Sir Anthony Irby; William Ellis	Irby and Ellis both secluded in Pride's Purge
Grimsby	William Wray; Edward Rossiter	
Stamford	John Weaver; Thomas Hatcher	Hatcher possibly secluded in Pride's Purge
Grantham	Sir William Airmine; Henry Pelham	Pelham secluded in Pride's Purge
=== Middlesex ===
Constituency	Members	Notes
Middlesex	Sir Gilbert Gerard, 1st Baronet of Harrow on the Hill; Sir Edward Spencer	Gerard secluded in Pride's Purge; Spencer not recorded after Pride's Purge
Westminster	John Glynne; William Bell	Glynne disabled 7 September 1747 but restored 7 June 1648 Possibly Glynne and Bell both secluded in Pride's Purge
City of London	Sir Thomas Soame; Isaac Penington; Samuel Vassall; John Venn	Soame and Vassall secluded in Pride's Purge
=== Monmouthshire ===
Constituency	Members	Notes
Monmouthshire	John Herbert; Henry Herbert	
Monmouth	Thomas Pury jun.	
=== Norfolk ===
Constituency	Members	Notes
Norfolk	Sir John Palgrave; Sir John Potts	Palgrave secluded in Pride's Purge; Potts possibly secluded.
Norwich	Thomas Atkins; Erasmus Earle	
King's Lynn	William Cecil, 2nd Earl of Salisbury; Thomas Toll	
Yarmouth	Miles Corbet; Edward Owner	Owner not recorded after Pride's Purge
Thetford	Sir Thomas Wodehouse; Framlingham Gawdy	Gawdy secluded in Pride's Purge
Castle Rising	John Spelman; Sir John Holland, Bt	Spelman secluded in Pride's Purge; Holland possibly secluded
=== Northamptonshire ===
Constituency	Members	Notes
Northamptonshire	Sir Gilbert Pickering, 1st Baronet; Sir John Dryden, 2nd Baronet	
Peterborough	William FitzWilliam; Sir Robert Napier, Bt	Fitzwilliam and Napier secluded
Northampton	Zouch Tate; Richard Knightley	Knightley secluded in Pride's Purge. Tate not recorded after Pride's Purge
Brackley	John Crew; Sir Martin Lister	Crew and Lister both secluded in Pride's Purge
Higham Ferrars	Edward Harby	Harby possibly named Harvey
=== Northumberland ===
Constituency	Members	Notes
Northumberland	Sir John Fenwick; William Fenwick	Both Fenwicks possibly secluded in Pride's Purge
Newcastle	John Blakiston ? Warmouth	Warmouth election 1647 declared void - replaced by Robert Ellison
Berwick upon Tweed	Sir Thomas Widdrington; Robert Scawen	
Morpeth	John Fiennes; George Fenwick	
=== Nottinghamshire ===
Constituency	Members	Notes
Nottinghamshire	John Hutchinson; Gervase Pigot	
Nottingham	Gilbert Millington; Francis Pierrepoint	
East Retford	Sir William Lister; Francis Thornhagh	Thornhagh killed in action 1648 replaced by Edward Nevill; Lister secluded in Pride's Purge
=== Oxfordshire ===
Constituency	Members	Notes
Oxfordshire	Thomas Viscount Wenman; Hon. James Fiennes	Wenman secluded in Pride's Purge; Fiennes possibly secluded
Oxford University	Sir Thomas Roe; John Selden	
Oxford	John Doyley; John Nixon (Alderman)	Doyley and Nixon possibly both secluded in Pride's Purge
Woodstock	William Lenthall; Sir Robert Pye	Lenthall Speaker; Pye secluded in Pride's Purge
Banbury	Nathaniel Fiennes	Fiennes secluded in Pride's Purge
=== Rutland ===
Constituency	Members	Notes
Rutland	Thomas Waite; James Harrington	
=== Salop ===
Constituency	Members	Notes
Shropshire	Sir John Corbet, 1st Baronet; Humphrey Edwards	Corbet secluded
Shrewsbury	Thomas Hunt; William Massam	
Bridgnorth	Robert Clive; Robert Charlton	Clive and Charlton not recorded after Pride's Purge
Ludlow	Thomas Mackworth; Thomas Moor	
Wenlock	William Pierrepont; Humphrey Bridges	Bridges also given as Humphrey Briggs
Bishops Castle	Isaiah Thomas; John Corbet	
=== Somerset ===
Constituency	Members	Notes
Somerset	George Horner; John Harrington	Horner secluded in Pride's Purge; Harrington not recorded after Pride's Purge
Bristol	Richard Aldworth; Luke Hodges	
Bath	James Ashe; Alexander Popham	
Wells	Lislebone Long; Clement Walker	Walker secluded
Taunton	John Palmer; George Searle	
Bridgwater	Sir Thomas Wroth; Robert Blake	
Minehead	Edward Popham; Walter Strickland	Popham not recorded after Pride's Purge
Ilchester	William Strode; Thomas Hodges	Strode and Hodges both possibly secluded in Pride's Purge
Milborne Port	William Carent; Thomas Grove	Grove secluded in Pride's Purge
=== Staffordshire ===
Constituency	Members	Notes
Staffordshire	John Bowyer; Sir Richard Skeffington	Skeffington died 1647 - replaced by Thomas Crompton Bowyer possibly secluded in Pride's Purge
Stafford	John Swinfen; Edward Leigh	Swinfen and Leigh secluded in Pride's Purge
Newcastle under Lyme	Samuel Terrick; Sir John Merrick	Terrick secluded in Pride's Purge
Lichfield	Michael Noble; Michael Biddulph	
Tamworth	George Abbot; Sir Peter Wentworth	
=== Suffolk ===
Constituency	Members	Notes
Suffolk	Sir Nathaniel Barnardiston; Sir Philip Parker	Parker secluded in Pride's Purge; Barnardiston not recorded after Pride's Purge
Ipswich	John Gurdon; Francis Bacon	
Dunwich	Anthony Bedingfield; Gen. Robert Brewster	
Orford	Sir William Playters, 2nd Baronet; Sir Charles Legross	Playters secluded in Pride's Purge
Aldeburgh	Squire Bence; Alexander Bence	Squire Bence died 1648; Alexander Bence excluded in Pride's Purge
Sudbury	(Sir) Simonds d'Ewes; Brampton Gurdon	d'Ewes secluded in Pride's Purge
Eye	Morris Barrow; Sir Roger North	Barrow and North both secluded in Pride's Purge
Bury St Edmunds	Sir Thomas Barnardiston; Sir William Spring	Spring secluded in Pride's Purge
=== Surrey ===
Constituency	Members	Notes
Surrey	Sir Richard Onslow; Sir Ambrose Browne	Onslow and Browne both secluded in Pride's Purge
Southwark	George Thomson; George Snelling	
Bletchingly	John Evelyn, senior Edward Bysshe jun.	Evelyn and Bysshe both possibly secluded in Pride's Purge
Reigate	William Lord Viscount Monson; George Evelyn	
Guildford	Sir Robert Parkhurst; Nicholas Stoughton	Stoughton died in 1648
Gatton	William Owfield; Thomas Sandys	Sandys and Owfield both secluded in Pride's Purge
Haslemere	John Goodwin; Carew Raleigh	
=== Sussex ===
Constituency	Members	Notes
Sussex	Sir Thomas Pelham, 2nd Baronet; Anthony Stapley	Pelham secluded in Pride's Purge
Chichester	Sir John Temple; Henry Peck	Temple and Pec secluded in Pride's Purge
Horsham	Thomas Middleton; Hall Ravenscroft	Middleton secluded in Pride's Purge
Midhurst	William Cawley; Sir Gregory Norton Bt.	
Lewes	Herbert Morley; Henry Shelley	
New Shoreham	John Alford; Herbert Springet	Alford secluded in Pride's Purge; Springet possibly secluded
Bramber	Arthur Onslow; James Temple	Onslow secluded in Pride's Purge
Steyning	Edward Apsley; Herbert Board	Board died 1648
East Grinstead	Robert Goodwin; John Baker	
Arundel	John Downes*; Herbert Hay	Hay secluded in Pride's Purge
=== Warwickshire ===
Constituency	Members	Notes
Warwickshire	Sir John Burgoyne Bt. Thomas Boughton	Burgoyne and Boughton secluded in Pride's Purge
Coventry	John Barker; William Jesson	Jesson possibly secluded in Pride's Purge; Barker excluded but re-instated
Warwick	William Purefoy; Godfrey Bosvile	
=== Westmorland ===
Constituency	Members	Notes
Westmoreland	James Bellingham; Henry Lawrence	Lawrence possibly secluded in Pride's Purge; Bellingham not recorded after Pride's Purge
Appleby	Richard Salway; Henry Ireton	Ireton died, November 1651
=== Wiltshire ===
Constituency	Members	Notes
Wiltshire	James Herbert; Edmund Ludlow	Herbert excluded in Pride's Purge
Salisbury	Michael Oldisworth; John Dove	
Wilton	Sir Henry Vane (the elder); Sir Benjamin Rudyerd	Rudyerd secluded in Pride's Purge
Downton	Alexander Thistlethwaite	Thistlethwaite possibly secluded in Pride's Purge; Other seat remained vacant
Hindon	Robert Reynolds	Other seat remained vacant
Heytesbury	Thomas Moore; Edward Ashe	Moore possibly secluded in Pride's Purge
Westbury	William Wheler; John Ashe	Wheler secluded in Pride's Purge
Calne	Rowland Wilson; Hugh Rogers	
Devizes	Sir Edward Baynton; Robert Nicolas	
Chippenham	Sir Edward Hungerford; Sir Edward Bayntun	Hungerford died 1648 – replaced by William Eyre of Neston
Malmesbury	Sir Neville Poole; Sir John Danvers	Poole secluded in Pride's Purge
Cricklade	Robert Jenner; Thomas Hodges	Jenner excluded in Pride's Purge; Hodges not recorded after Pride's Purge
Great Bedwyn	Henry Hungerford; Edmund Harvey	Hungerford secluded in Pride's Purge
Ludgershall	Walter Long; Sir John Evelyn	Long and Evelyn both possibly secluded in Pride's Purge
Old Sarum	Hon. Robert Cecil; Roger Kirkham	Kirkham replaced by Sir Richard Lucy; Cecil not recorded after Pride's Purge
Wootton Bassett	Edward Poole; Edward Massie	Massie and Poole both secluded in Pride's Purge
Marlborough	Charles Fleetwood; Philip Smith	
=== Worcestershire ===
Constituency	Members	Notes
Worcestershire	John Wilde; Humphrey Salwey	
Worcester	John Coucher; John Nash	Nash excluded under Pride's Purge
Droitwich	Thomas Rainsborough; Edmund Wylde	Rainsborough killed in action 1648 replaced by George Wylde II
Evesham	Richard Cresheld; Samuel Gardner	Cresheld not recorded after Pride's Purge; Gardner secluded
Bewdley	William Hopkins	Hopkins died before taking his seat – replaced by Nicholas Lechmere
=== Yorkshire ===
Constituency	Members	Notes
Yorkshire	Vacant	
York	Sir William Allanson; Thomas Hoyle (Alderman)	Hoyle died 1650
Kingston upon Hull	Sir Henry Vane, junior Peregrine Pelham	Pelham died 1650
Knaresborough	Sir William Constable, Bt. Thomas Stockdale	
Scarborough	Matthew Boynton; Luke Robinson	Boynton died 1647 replaced by John Anlaby
Ripon	Sir Charles Egerton; Miles Moody	Moody died 1647 replaced by Sir John Bourchier; Egerton possibly secluded in Pride's Purge
Richmond	Thomas Chaloner; Francis Thorpe	
Hedon	Sir William Strickland; John Alured	Alured died 1651
Boroughbridge	Henry Stapylton; Sir Thomas Mallaverer Bt	Stapylton possibly secluded in Pride's Purge
Thirsk	Francis Lascelles; William Ayscough	Ayscough possibly secluded in Pride's Purge
Aldborough	Brian Stapylton; Thomas Scott	Scott died 1648, replaced by James Chaloner; Stapylton not recorded after Pride's Purge
Beverley	John Nelthorpe; James Nelthorpe	John Nelthorpe secluded in Pride's Purge
Pontefract	Henry Arthington; William White	
Malton	Richard Darley; Sir Henry Cholmley	Chomley excluded in Pride's Purge
Northallerton	Henry Darley; John Wastell	
=== Cinque Ports ===
Hastings	John Pelham; Roger Gratwick	Pelham secluded in Pride's Purge
Romney	(Sir) Norton Knatchbull; Richard Browne	Knatchbull secluded in Pride's Purge; Browne not recorded after Pride's Purge
Hythe	Henry Heyman; Thomas Westrow	
Dover	John Dixwell; Benjamin Weston	
Sandwich	Charles Rich; Sir Edward Partridge	Rich and Partridge both secluded in Pride's Purge
Seaford	Sir Thomas Parker; Francis Gerard	Gerard excluded in Pride's Purge; Parker not recorded after Pride's Purge
Rye	William Hay; John Fagg	
Winchelsea	Sir Henry Oxenden, 1st Baronet; Samuel Gott	Oxenden secluded in Pride's Purge; Gott possibly secluded
=== Wales ===
Constituency	Members	Notes
Anglesey	Richard Wood	Wood excluded in Pride's Purge
Newburgh	William Jones	Jones secluded in Pride's Purge
Brecknockshire	Philip Jones	
Brecknock	Ludovic Lewis	
Cardiganshire	Sir Richard Pryse, 1st Baronet	
Cardigan	Thomas Wogan	
Carmarthenshire	John Lloyd	Lloyd secluded in Pride's Purge
Carmarthen	William Davies	Davies secluded in Pride's Purge
Carnarvonshire	Richard Wynn	Wynn secluded in Pride's Purge
Carnarvon	William Foxwist	Foxwist secluded in Pride's Purge
Denbighshire	Sir Thomas Myddelton	Myddelton secluded in Pride's Purge
Denbigh	Simon Thelwall	
Flintshire	John Trevor	
Flint	Thomas Myddelton	
Glamorgan	Philip, Lord Herbert	
Cardiff	Algernon Sidney	
Merioneth	Roger Pope	Pope died 1647 – replaced by John Jones
Montgomeryshire	Edward Vaughan	Vaughan secluded
Montgomery	George Devereux	
Pembrokeshire	Arthur Owen	Owen secluded in Pride's Purge
Pembroke	Hugh Owen	Owen possibly secluded in Pride's Purge
Haverford West	Robert Needham	Needham secluded in Pride's Purge
Radnorshire	Arthur Annesley	Annesley possibly secluded in Pride's Purge
Radnor	Robert Harley	Harley secluded in Pride's Purge

== See also ==
- Long Parliament
