= Simon Norton =

Simon Norton may refer to:

- Simon Norton (MP) (1578–1641), English politician
- Simon P. Norton (1952–2019), English mathematician

== See also ==
- Norton Simon
