= Thomas Norton (disambiguation) =

Thomas Norton (1532–1584) was an English lawyer and politician.

Thomas Norton may also refer to:

- Thomas Norton (alchemist) (d. 1513), English poet and alchemist
- Sir Thomas Norton, 1st Baronet (1615–1691), English politician
- Thomas Norton (died 1748), MP for Bury St Edmunds, 1727–1733
- Thomas Norton (MP for Bristol), MP for Bristol, 1399, 1402, 1411–1414, 1417, 1420, 1421
- Thomas Norton jnr, MP for Bristol, 1436
