= Samuel Owfield =

English politician

Sir Samuel Owfield (1595–1644) was an English politician who sat in the House of Commons at various times between 1624 and 1644.

Owfield was the son of Roger Owfield, Fishmonger, of Billiter Lane, London and his wife Thomasine More, daughter of John More, merchant, of Ipswich. Owfield had acquired the manor of Upper Gatton in Surrey by 1624. In 1624, he was elected Member of Parliament for Gatton. He was re-elected MP for Gatton as Sir Samuel Owfield in 1626 and 1628 and sat until 1629 when King Charles decided to rule without parliament and then did so for eleven years. In 1638 Owfield inherited from his mother estates in Lincolnshire.

In April 1640, Owfield was re-elected MP for Gatton in the Short Parliament. He was re-elected for the Long Parliament in November 1640, and sat until his death in 1644.

Owfield married Katherine Smith, daughter of William Smith of London. His son William was also an MP.

Parliament of England
Preceded by Sir Thomas Gresham; Sir Thomas Bludder	Member of Parliament for Gatton; 1624; With: Sir Edmund Bowyer	Succeeded by Thomas Crewe; Sir Charles Howard
Preceded by Richard Lewknor; Sir Anthony Manie	Member of Parliament for Midhurst; 1625; With: Richard Lewknor	Succeeded by Richard Lewknor; Sir Henry Spiller
Preceded by Thomas Crewe; Sir Charles Howard	Member of Parliament for Gatton; 1626–1629; With: Sir Charles Howard	Parliament suspended until 1640
Vacant Parliament suspended since 1629	Member of Parliament for Gatton; 1640–1644; With: Edward Sanders 1640; Thomas Sandys 1640–1644	Succeeded by Thomas Sandys; William Owfield
