= Maurice Thomson =

English merchant, slave trader and Puritan

Coat of Arms of Maurice Thompson

Maurice Thomson (also spelled Maurice Thompson; 1601/04–1676), of St Andrew's parish, Eastcheap, City of London and of Haversham in Buckinghamshire, was an English merchant, slave trader and Puritan, said to be England's "greatest colonial merchant of his day". During the Wars of the Three Kingdoms and the Interregnum Thomson was a leading figure in a relatively small group of merchants that exerted significant influence over English state finance and economic policy.

He was the eldest son and heir of Robert Thomson of Watton-at-Stone, Hertfordshire, by his wife Elizabeth Harsflet, daughter of John Harsflet (alias Halfehead, Harsnett) of Watton-at-Stone. His sister Mary Thomson married William Tucker, a merchant and one of the first plantation owners in the Colony of Virginia. His younger brothers included Col. George Thomson (c. 1607 – 1691), a merchant, Parliamentarian soldier and MP for Southwark; Robert Thomson, youngest brother, who was also a merchant; Paul Thomson and Sir William Thomson.

In the early 1650s, Thomson and business associate Rowland Wilson had engaged James Pope to act as agent on their ship Friendship, for a number of slaving voyages to Gambia. Dresser quotes them as instructing Pope to, along with loading the ship with African slaves for Barbados, "find 15 or 20 many lusty young Negers and bring them home with you for London".

Thomson married Dorothy Vaux, daughter of John Vaux, of Pembrokeshire, by whom he had children including John Thompson, 1st Baron Haversham (c. 1648 – 1710), eldest son and heir; and Mary Thomson, who became the wife of William Owfield (1623–1664), MP.

He owned estates and property including Elsham, Lincolnshire, which manor he purchased in 1655, and Worcester House, Mile End Green, which he sold in 1675 to the Church. He died in 1676 and was buried in the chancel of Haversham Church.

== Sources ==
- Brenner, Robert (1993). Merchants and Revolution: Commercial Change, Political Conflict, and London's Overseas Traders, 1550-1653. Cambridge University Press.
- Brown, David (2020). Empire and enterprise: Money, power and the Adventurers for Irish land during the British Civil Wars. Manchester University Press. ISBN 9781526131997.
- McCartney, Martha W. (2007). Virginia Immigrants and Adventurers, 1607-1635: A Biographical Dictionary. Genealogical Publishing Company.
- Sheridan, Richard B. (1973). Sugar and Slavery: An Economic History of the British West Indies, 1623-1775. Johns Hopkins University Press. p. 88–90.
- Biographical details: ancestry.com
- John Burke, Sir Bernard Burke, A Genealogical and Heraldic History of the Extinct and Dormant Baronetcies, p. 523
