= Burleigh Hall =

Coordinates: 52.765°N 1.230°W

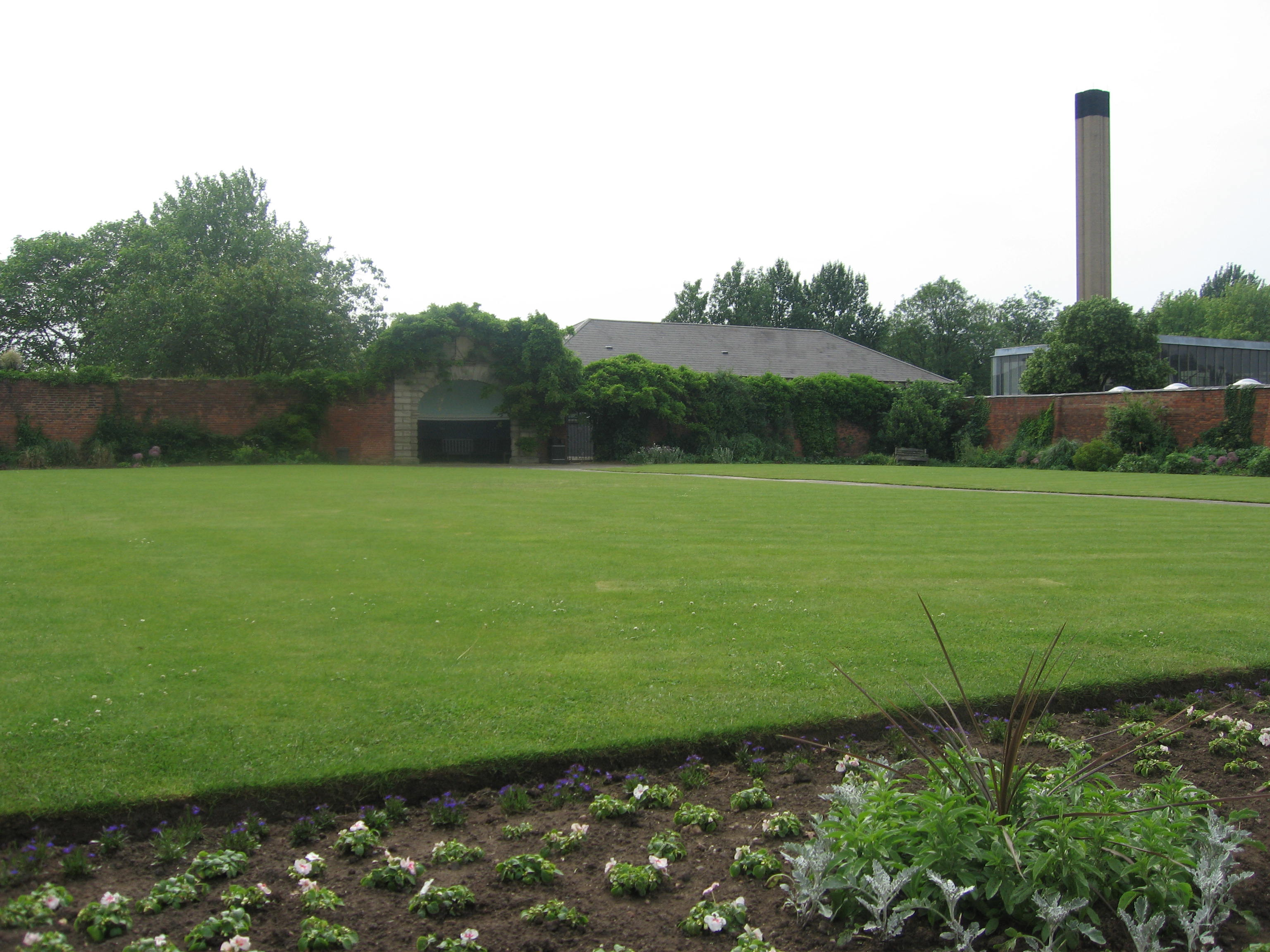
The walled garden, now part of the Loughborough University campus, once formed part of the Burleigh Estate

Burleigh Hall was a country house situated near Loughborough in the county of Leicestershire. Its land now forms part of the campus of Loughborough University.

== History ==
An early reference to the Burleigh estate describes how during the March 1644 Battle of Cotes Bridge in the Civil War, Parliamentary forces chased Royalists back to their garrison at Burleigh House at which time it was in the possession of the Hastings family. Following these events it was the third William Jesson (1650–1711), grandson of William Jesson (1580–1651) the Coventry dyer, Mayor and MP, who established a family seat at Burleigh Hall. He married Penelope Villiers of the influential Villiers family of Brooksby on 23 January 1669, he having been knighted the previous year.

However this was short-lived as in 1700 the estate was taken over by the Tate family, in 1711 it was held by Henry Tate and stayed directly in the family until the death of George Tate on 18 April 1822. George Tate appears to have died with no close relatives, the following is an extract from Bulletins and Other State Intelligence for the year 1849:

Whitehall, July 17, 1849
The Queen has been pleased to grant unto Louisa Pinfold, of Wimpole-street, in the parish of Saint Mary-le-bone, in the county of Middlesex, and of Burleigh-hall, in the parish of Loughborough, in the county of Leicester, Spinster, Her royal licence and authority that, in compliance with an earnest wish expressed in the last will and testament of her cousin, George Tate, late of Langdown, in the county of Southampton, Esq. deceased, she may henceforth take and use the surname of Tate, in addition to and after her present surname of Pinfold, and may also bear the arms of Tate quarterly with those of Pinfold; such arms being first duly exemplified according to the laws of arms, and recorded in the Herald’s Office, otherwise the said licence to be void and of none effect

Miss Louisa Pinfold Tate died on 21 July at her residence in Wimpole Street, Marylebone, London, her death being reported in The Gentleman's Magazine July–December, 1861 The next reference to the Hall's ownership comes in 1847 when there is again an end to the lineage of the owning family, Miss Julia Tate is described as being wealthy and without a known living relative, with the author of an 1847 Tourist Guide describing how Miss Tate ...is not only a musician, but a linguist; has travelled on the continent, and was desirous of visiting the United States, and seeing a country of which she has read, and heard so much, both for and against.

In 1958 the then owner of the Burleigh Estate agreed to sell the whole of his land to Loughborough College of Technology, at which time it was around 90 acres (360,000 m^{2}), this included Burleigh Hall which the College had intended to use as its administrative centre but its fabric had deteriorated to such an extent that it was decided that demolition was the best option.

== The House ==
In 1847 Burleigh Hall was described as being a mile from Garendon Park, and located in the middle of parkland containing deer. At this time the hall was owned by Miss Julia Tate who John Sherburne described as having selected a collection of paintings with much taste and placed her mark upon the property with it showing the handiwork and judicious mind of woman.

The Hall was probably constructed in the second half of the seventeenth century, likely to be linked to the arrival of the Jesson family. Given a Georgian appearance around a century later, it was described as having an ornate pedimented facade faced eastwards towards the town, and [a] plainer one, westwards towards Charnwood Forest at the time of its demolition.

Having been an estate of around 374 acres (1.51 km^{2}) in 1831 it had fallen to around 90 acres (360,000 m^{2}) in 1958 when it was sold to the College, being then added to the Campus forming the area west of the existing playing field site.

== Today ==
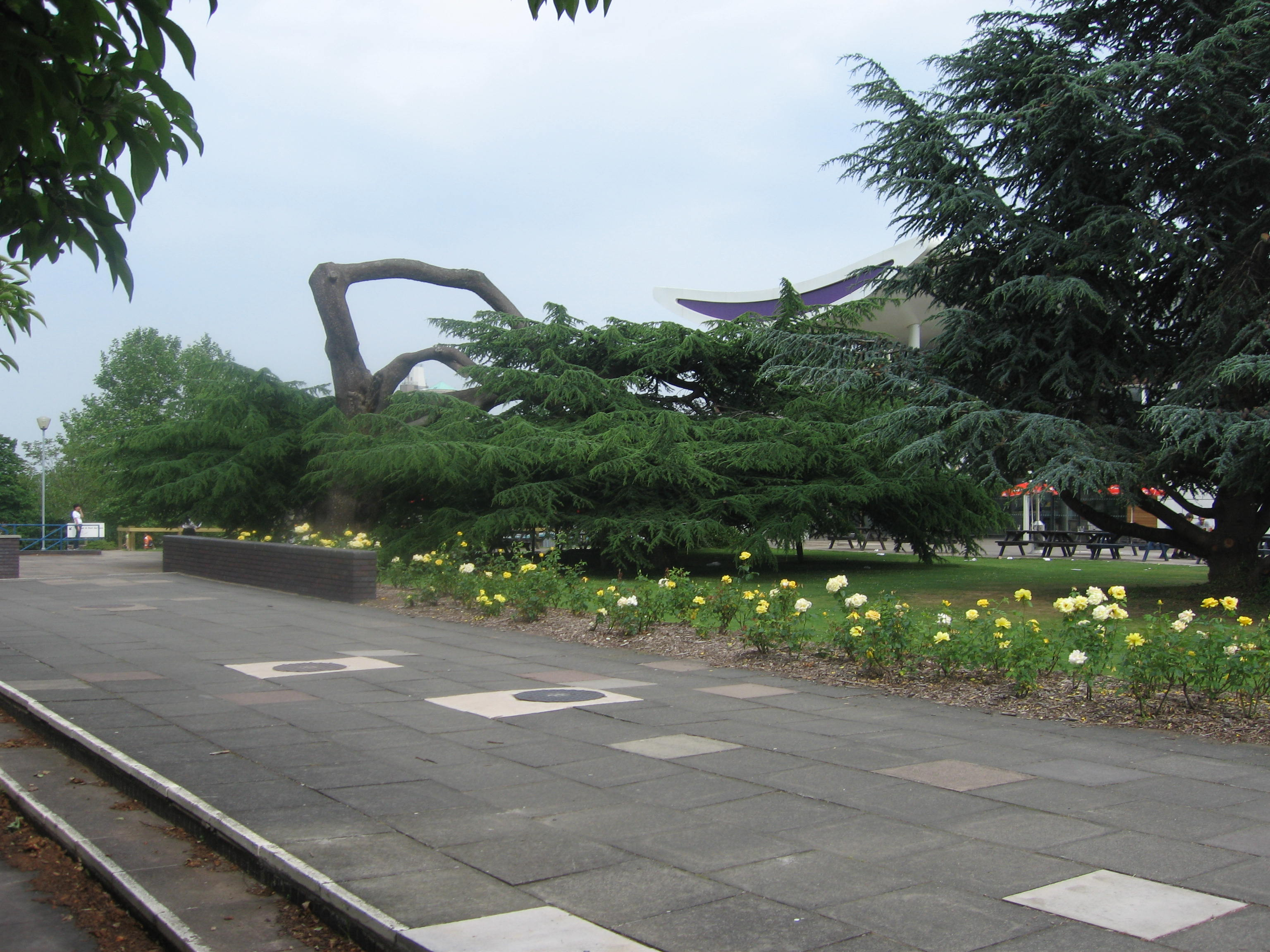
The Cedar of Lebanon Tree in 2006

Following the demolition of the main house there are a few remnants of the estate which can be seen around the University campus today:

- Cedar of Lebanon tree believed to be between 250 and 300 years old, it now forms the centrepiece of a new court flanked by the University's Herbert Manzoni, Edward Herbert, and Bridgeman buildings, having been retained by the Architects when this area of the campus was constructed.
- Gardeners Cottage originally a farmhouse it is reputedly the oldest complete dwelling in Loughborough. Its listing describes its left hand parts timber framed with brick nogging on stone plinth, right hand part rubble stone, Concrete pantile roofs, an external stone stack heightened in brick at right hand end with a Brick bread oven roofed in Swithland slates.
- Moat from the Civil War era, dug as a defensive measure to the south-west of the house, a section remains in the garden of the University Guest House.
- Walled Garden and Summer House which are immediately next to the site of the Hall, described in their listing as being red brick walls with central recess entered through segmental rusticated stone arch with carved head keystone [with] pediment incorporating coat-of-arms above. Today used as a garden, occasionally for functions, with the Garden of Remembrance immediately behind.

== See also ==
- Charnwood Forest
- English country house
- English Civil War
- Loughborough
- Loughborough University
