= Matthew Cradock =

English merchant and politician (died 1641)

Governor of the Massachusetts Bay Company
- In office 1628–1629
- Succeeded by: John Winthrop (as Governor of Massachusetts Bay Colony)

Personal details
- Born: unknown
- Died: 27 May 1641
- Party: Roundhead

Matthew Cradock (also spelled Craddock and Craddocke; died 27 May 1641) was a London merchant, politician, and the first governor of the Massachusetts Bay Company. Founded in 1628, it was an organization of Puritan businessmen that organized and established the Massachusetts Bay Colony. Although he never visited the colony, Cradock owned property and businesses there, and he acted on its behalf in London. His business and trading empire encompassed at least 18 ships, and extended from the West Indies and North America to Europe and the Near East. He was a dominant figure in the tobacco trade.

Cradock was a strong supporter of the Parliamentary cause in the years leading up to the English Civil War. He opposed royalist conservatism in the East India Company and, as a member of the Long Parliament, supported the Root and Branch attempts to radically reform the Church of England. He played a leading role in the Protestation of 1641, and died not long after.

== Early life and business ==
Coat of Arms of Matthew Craddock

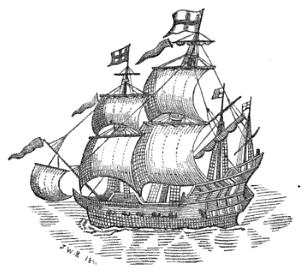
Cradock's business interests included ownerships in trading vessels that would have been similar to this ship, the Red Dragon.

Nothing is known of Matthew Cradock's early life. He was from a Staffordshire family; a cousin, also named Matthew Cradock, was mayor of Stafford, and built a mansion on the site of Caverswall Castle, Staffordshire. Although his father was a cleric, his grandfather was a merchant, and other family members were involved in trade. Cradock was twice married. By his first wife Damaris he had a daughter, also named Damaris; by his second wife, Rebeccah, he had three children that apparently did not survive. Rebeccah survived him, but the children are not mentioned in his will.

In 1606 he was an apprentice to William Cockayne at the Skinners' Company, then a major London shipping firm. He probably began trading with northwestern Europe, but eventually expanded his business to the Near East. Cradock joined the Levant Company in 1627, and in 1628 he purchased £2,000 of stock in the East India Company. Cradock served as a director of the East India Company in 1629–1630 and again from 1634 until his death in 1641. Cradock used his business and personal connections to establish a lucrative trade, shipping New World tobacco to the Near East and sending provisions to the colonies in North America and the West Indies that produced it. He is known to have been owner or part owner of 18 ships between 1627 and 1640, and he was one of a relatively small number of businessmen whose trade encompassed both eastern trade (to India and the Levant) and trade in European waters. By the end of the 1630s he stood at the center of one of the largest trading businesses involved in the Americas. In 1640 Cradock was a member of a group of business men who opposed the conservative royalist leadership of the East India Company, engaging in an unsuccessful attempt to reform the company's directorate.

== Massachusetts Bay Company ==
Interest by London merchants in establishing and managing colonial settlements in North America waned after the 1624 failure of the London Company and the subsequent conversion of the Colony of Virginia into a Crown colony. Cradock was a notable exception; a Puritan, in 1628 he made a major investment in the New England Company, formed by a group of Puritan religious and business leaders to take over the assets of the failed Dorchester Company and make new ventures in the colonisation of North America. Cradock was elected the company's first governor on 13 May 1628. Not long after, the company acquired a grant of land on Massachusetts Bay from the Plymouth Council for New England, and sent John Endecott with a small group of settlers to begin the process of establishing a colony at a place now called Salem, Massachusetts.

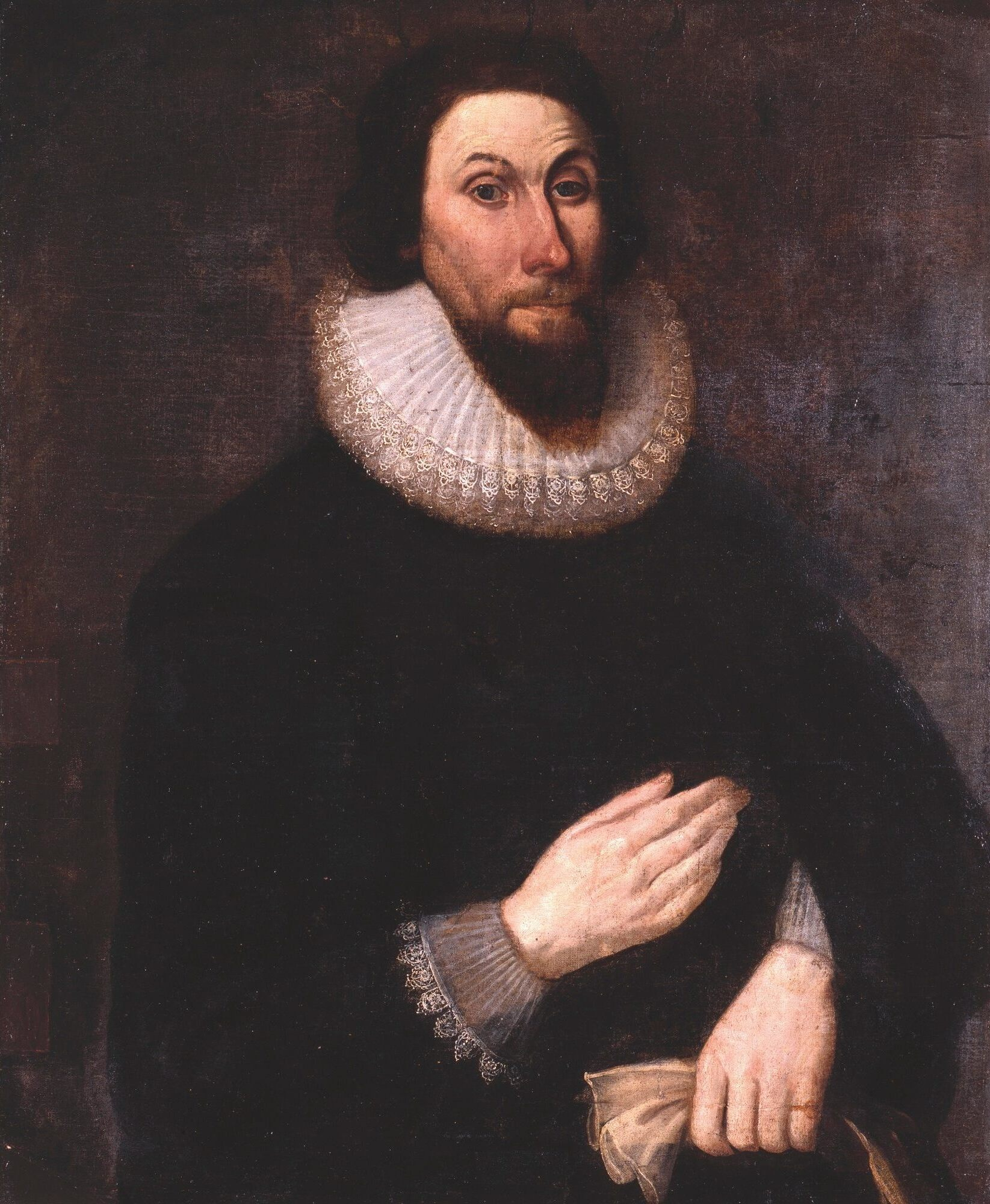
John Winthrop succeeded Cradock as governor of the Massachusetts Bay Company.

The company's land grant was not without problems, because it overlapped a grant that had previously been acquired by John Oldham. Cradock wrote to Endecott in early 1629, warning him about the issue, suggesting that he settle colonists in the claimed area and also that he treat well the Old Planters (the surviving colonists from the failed Dorchester Company settlement). Cradock also recommended the colonists work on building ships and other profit-making activities. Later in 1629 another small fleet sailed for the colony; on board, in addition to Puritan settlers, were skilled craftsmen of all types who were engaged in Cradock's businesses.

The company, in order to protect its claims, acquired a royal charter in 1629, under which Cradock was named the colony's governor in London, while Endecott governed in the colony. In that same year, financial instability in the government caused by King Charles I's desire to prosecute a war with Scotland led the company's investors to fear their investment might be at risk. Cradock, at a shareholder meeting in July 1629, suggested that the company transfer its governance to the colony itself, something that was only possible because the charter did not specify where the company's shareholder meetings were to be held. However, some investors (Cradock among them) did not want to emigrate to the colony, so a means to buy out those investors needed to be devised. After negotiating through the summer, an agreement was reached on 29 August 1629. It called for those shareholders who were emigrating to buy out those that remained in England after seven years; the latter would also receive a share of some of the colony's business activities, including the fur trade. John Winthrop, one of the shareholders who was emigrating, was elected the company's governor in October.

Winthrop sailed to Massachusetts in 1630, and the fleet carrying the colonists included two of Cradock's ships, and agents and servants of his who were to see to his commercial interests. Cradock, who took leave of the emigrants at the Isle of Wight, remained behind in England. Cradock's representatives secured for him a plantation at Medford, which became a base for business operations funded by Cradock, including the colony's first shipyard. As the colony developed, Cradock's land holdings expanded to include properties in Ipswich and Marblehead.

Even though he did not travel to the colony, he continued to operate in London on its behalf. In 1629 he worked to recruit sympathetic Puritan ministers to emigrate. He sought permission from the king's Privy council to freely export provisions to the colony, claiming the colonists were in dire straits due to a shortage of provisions and threats from Native Americans. He and Governor Winthrop exchanged letters; in one written in 1636 Cradock promised £50 toward the establishment of an institute of higher learning now known as Harvard University.

Actions by the Massachusetts Bay Colony rulers came into question at the Privy Council in 1633. Several opponents of the Puritans levelled charges that the colony's administrators sought independence from the crown and laws of England; Cradock and other company representatives were called before the council to answer these charges. They successfully defended the actions of the colonists, but the Puritans' opponents succeeded in having ships full of colonists detained from sailing in February 1633/4 until the colonial charter was presented to the council for inspection. Cradock was called upon to provide it; he informed the council that the charter was in the colony, and secured the release of the ships with a promise to have the charter delivered. The colonial council in Boston, not wanting to send the document for fear the charter would be revoked, temporized, claiming in their July 1634 meeting that the document could only be released by a vote of the colony's General Court. It was not scheduled to meet until September, at which time the matter would be taken up. The General Court refused to consider the issue, and began fortifying Boston Harbour, expecting a military confrontation over the issue. The 1634 launch of a ship intended to carry a force to the colony was unsuccessful, ending the military threat to the colony. The political threats continued, and the charter of the Plymouth Council of New England, issuer of the colony's land grant, was revoked. Furthermore, criminal charges, some of them clearly trumped up, were laid against Cradock and others associated with the Massachusetts Bay Company in 1635. Cradock was acquitted of most of these charges, but was convicted of usurpation of authority and deprived of his ability to act on behalf of the company.

== Politics ==
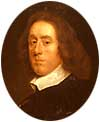
Sir Henry Vane the Younger

In 1640 Cradock was an auditor of the City of London Corporation. In April 1640, he was elected member of parliament for the City of London in the Short Parliament, and he was again elected to the Long Parliament in November 1640. He and other London MPs were politically allied to the Parliamentarian faction of Sir Henry Vane the Younger, and he supported the Root and Branch petition calling for radical reforms of the Church of England. In the opening session of the Long Parliament he denounced the king's plan of fortifying the Tower of London, and declared that the city would not contribute its share of taxes until the garrison was removed. In early May 1641 Cradock brought word to the Parliament reports that the king was planning to send armed troops to seize the Tower of London; this news sparked the Protestation of 1641, in which Cradock played a leading role. He continued to be active in the Parliament, serving on a committee for recusants, until his death, which was apparently quite sudden, on 27 May 1641. His remains were interred at St Swithin, London Stone, on 3 June 1641.

== Family ==
Damaris, Matthew Cradock's daughter by his first wife, married first Thomas Andrewes, citizen and Leatherseller of London (the son of Sir Thomas Andrewes, Lord Mayor of London in 1649 and in 1651–52). There were several children: Andrewes died in 1653. She then married Ralph Cudworth, a leading figure of the Cambridge Platonists and Master of Christ's College, Cambridge, by whom she became mother of three further sons and a daughter, Damaris Cudworth, Lady Masham. Matthew Cradock's daughter Damaris Cudworth died at High Laver, Essex, in 1695.

Rebeccah Cradock, Matthew's second wife, remarried first to Richard Glover, and lastly to Benjamin Whichcote, another senior figure of the Cambridge Platonists, Provost of King's College, Cambridge, a close colleague of Ralph Cudworth's. Both were closely associated with Mathew Cradock's nephew, Samuel Cradock (a pupil of Whichcote's), whose brother Zachary was Provost of Eton College. Cudworth, Whichcote and the brothers Cradock had all been students at Emmanuel College, Cambridge.

== Notes ==
Parliament of England
Vacant Parliament suspended since 1629	Member of Parliament for City of London; 1640–1641; With: Isaac Penington; Samuel Vassall; Sir Thomas Soame	Succeeded by Isaac Penington; Samuel Vassall; Sir Thomas Soame; John Venn
