= Samuel Vassall =

English merchant, politician and slave trader

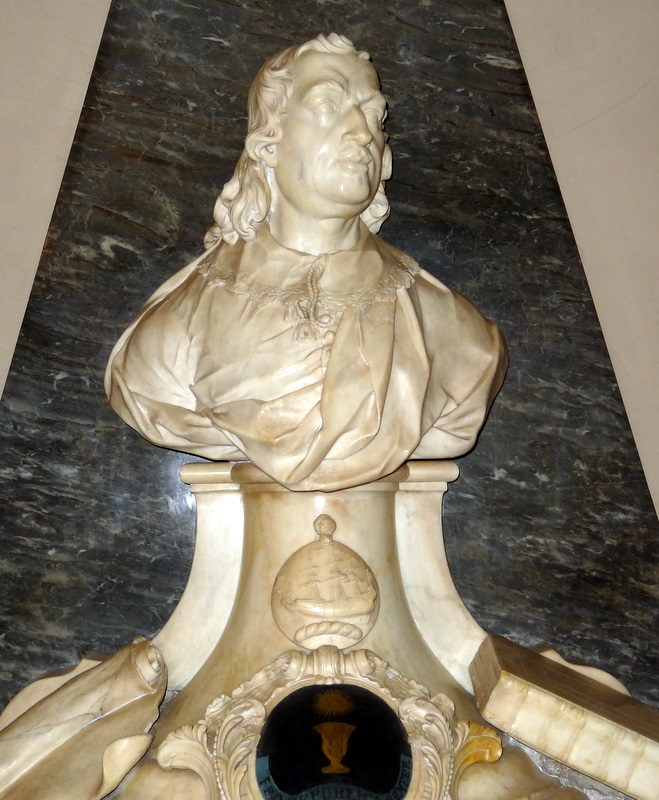
Bust in King's Chapel, Boston

Samuel Vassall (1586–1667) was an English merchant, politician, and slave trader who sat in the House of Commons from 1640 to 1648. Vassall was the majority shareholder of the Guinea Company, founded in 1651. Samuel Vassall was 77 when he left London for Carolina in 1663. He died in the America colonies in 1667.

== Early life ==
Vassall was the second son of John Vassall and his second wife, Anna Russell, and was baptised at Stepney on 5 June 1586. His father was a Huguenot refugee who travelled to England from Normandy before August 1572. At his own expense, John Vassall fitted out two ships, The Samuel and the Little Toby, which he commanded against the Spanish Armada and later invested in the Virginia Company. Samuel Vassall lived for a time at Cockethurst Farmhouse, in what was then, Prittlewell, Essex, at the start of the 1600s. The house remained in the Vassall family until 1808.

== Merchant and slave-trading career ==
Vassall launched his career as a merchant for the Levant Company, trading Ottoman goods including rum, spices, opium, cloth, tin, and pewter in Europe. But "by the later 1620s he had formed partnerships to supply provisions to Virginia and Barbados, becoming in the process one of the leading London importers of Chesapeake tobacco." In March 1628, Samuel and his brother William Vassall were among the original "incorporators" of the Massachusetts Bay Company and patentees of lands in Massachusetts. The Vassalls "afterwards acquired by purchase . . . two-twentieths of all Massachusetts in New England."

In September 1628, Vassall was imprisoned and his goods retained when he "refused to pay to the custom-house the tonnage and poundage on a large quantity of currants which he was importing. In 1630, Vassall unsuccessfully attempted to "plant a colony in what is now South Carolina." He was contracted to "transport passengers and supply the colony in its early stages. But the operation miscarried when the prospective colonists were mistakenly landed in Virginia. As a result, Vassal! ended up paying £600 in damages to his contractors after a long suit." In June, he again contended against tonnage and poundage requirements, "having brought from Virginia to Tilbury a vessel laden ‘with that drug called tobacco'", and in September, he advanced £50 to the Massachusetts Bay Company.

Brothers Samuel and William Vassall were "active in nearly all aspects of English Atlantic colonisation during the first half of the 17th century," and slavery formed an "integral part of the Vassalls' colonial operations." Samuel Vassall worked as an independent trader in the 1640s, seeking to profit from "both luxuries and enslaved Africans" "Between 1642 and 1645, and again in 1647, Samuel joined syndicates owning ships trading between the Guinea coast and the Caribbean, supplying Barbados with slaves." In 1651, he became the governor and major shareholder of the Guinea Company, which bought and sold enslaved Africans. One 1651 instruction by the Guinea Company "asked a captain to ‘put aboard . . . so many negers as your ship can carry,'" apparently for enslavement in England, while another read, ‘We pray you buy as many lusty negers as she will can carry, and so despatch her to the Barbadoes'", where Vassall's brother William owned a sugar plantation, taking advantage of the "rapid and immense fortunes to be accrued." For nearly 200 years following his arrival, "the [Vassall] family built its wealth by running slave-labor plantations in the Caribbean" where they were among the "leading planters." In time, the Vassalls owned 18 slave-labor plantations in Jamaica, where they held a minimum of 3,865 slaves according to records now held by the Center for the Study of the Legacy of British Slavery.

== Political career ==
In April 1640, Vassall was elected Member of Parliament for City of London in the Short Parliament. In June of the same year he was summoned together with Richard Chambers by the council in order to be ‘committed to some prisons in remote parts for seducing the King's people'. In November 1640 he was re-elected MP for the City of London in the Long Parliament and sat until he was excluded in 1648 under Pride's Purge. At this time he was styled clothier or clothworker. On 2 December Vassall "delivered his grievances by word of mouth" to the commons, and a committee was appointed to consider them. On 2 February 1641 the House of Commons ordered the farmers of the customs and imports to restitute to him the tobacco which had been seized. In July the committee meeting in the Star-chamber was still considering "of some fit way for reparation."

Vassall took the ‘protestation’ on 3 May 1641. In 1642 he was one of the commissioners for plantations in the American colonies, and as such in November took part in the appointment of Sir Thomas Warner as governor of the Caribbee Islands. He was one of the commissioners for the incorporation of Providence plantations in the Narraganset Bay in New England in 1643. Vassall took the covenant on 22 September 1643. On 20 February 1645 he was one of the committee for the city of London for raising funds towards the maintenance of the Scottish army, and on 11 July 1646 he was named one of the commissioners for the kingdom of England for the conservation of peace between the two kingdoms. Early in 1650, as a trader to Guinea, he was giving information to the house about disputes between various merchants and the Guinea Company.

With regard to Vassall's attempts to secure compensation for his losses and imprisonment, the matter was referred on 14 June 1644 to the committee for the navy, and on 18 January 1647 the commons voted him £10,445 12s. 2d. He had also advanced money for the parliamentary forces in Ireland, and on 6 May 1647, £2,591 17s. 6d., due to Vassall on this account, was ordered to be made chargeable on the grand excise, "with interest on the same’ payable every six months". Vassall, however, received nothing. On 6 April 1654, in a petition presented to the Protector, he stated that as a result of resisting tonnage and poundage he had lost £15,000, and begged leave to refund himself by means of privileges to import French wines, ship coals and lead, or receive forest land. The debt with interest now amounted to £20,202 7s. 3d. On 6 May 1656 he was granted £150 annually as interest on the debt formerly charged on the excise. On 26 May on the taking of a "Spanish prize" the council issued a warrant to pay him £1,000. He was nevertheless informed on 8 September 1657 that he should make his application for payment to parliament, "as no revenue remains at his highness's disposal to satisfy the said debt." On 18 March 1658 the petition was again read to the council, and again on 3 June 1658, at which time Vassall was a "prisoner in the upper bench." On 1 April 1659 the commons recommended the Protector to grant a privy seal to pay him of £500 as part of the debt and a bill was prepared for signature on 5 April. On 18 August 1660 it was ordered that the remainder of the debt should again be made chargeable on the excise, and "forthwith paid to Mr. Vassall."

== Later life ==
In 1663 Vassall was in Carolina making arrangements with the lords proprietors of the colony regarding a claim laid by him for part of a term not yet expired. He probably died in Massachusetts, but the exact time or place is not known. When letters of administration were granted in London to his son Francis on 24 September 1667, it was stated that he died abroad.

Vassall married Frances Cartwright, daughter of Abraham and Joan Cartwright of St Andrew Undershaft, London. They had several children.

Parliament of England
Vacant Parliament suspended since 1629	Member of Parliament for City of London; 1640–1648; With: Thomas Soame; Isaac Penington; Matthew Cradock 1640–1641; John Venn 1641–1648	Succeeded by Isaac Penington; John Venn
