= Thomas Sandys (Gatton MP) =

English politician

Thomas Sandys (or Sands or Sandes; 1600–1658) was an English politician, MP for Gatton.

Sandys was born in 1600, the elder son of John Sandys of Leatherhead, Surrey. He was educated at Corpus Christi College, Oxford, matriculating in 1617, aged 17. He became a barrister-at-law at the Middle Temple in 1625, and a bencher in 1648.

In the Long Parliament elected in 1640, Sandys was elected MP for Gatton along with Sir Samuel Owfield (who died in 1644 and was replaced by his son William Owfield in 1645). A rival candidate for Sandys' seat was returned by the Copley family, a Mr. Sanders, who was declared not duly elected on 5 November 1641.

Although Sandys supported Parliament against the King, both he and William Owfield were secluded from Parliament in Pride's Purge in 1648.

Sandys played no part in politics during the ascendancy of Oliver Cromwell, and died at the end of 1658.

Parliament of England
Vacant Parliament not summoned 1629–1640	Member of Parliament for Gatton; 1640–1648; With: Sir Samuel Owfield; William Owfield	Vacant Seat not represented in Rump Parliament
