= George Thomson (MP for Southwark) =

English merchant and Parliamentarian soldier

George Thomson (c. 1607–1691) was an English merchant and Parliamentarian soldier, an official and politician.

== Early life ==
He was a younger son of Robert Thomson of Watton, Hertfordshire, by his wife Elizabeth, daughter of John Harsflet or Halfehead of the same place; Maurice Thomson (1601/4–1676) the Virginia settler was an older brother, and Thomson was there as a significant figure from 1623, before returning to London as a merchant trading with Virginia and the Caribbean. The youngest brother Robert Thomson, also a merchant, was in New England for a period.

The family were Parliamentarians, and early in 1643 Thomson held the commission of captain of a troop of horse under William Russell, 5th Earl of Bedford. In the following year he served under Sir William Waller in his western campaign, and at this period attained the rank of colonel. Losing a leg in action, he retired from military service.

== Political career ==
Thomson was returned to parliament for Southwark, probably in August 1645, and on 18 February 1651 was appointed a member of the English Council of State. On 8 April that year he became a commissioner of customs, and in 1652 he was sent to the fleet as a commissioner to consult with Robert Blake and report the condition of affairs to the Council. On 2 December 1652 he was appointed to the committee for the admiralty, the committee for the Ordnance, and the committee for trades, plantations, and foreign affairs.

In April 1653 differences between Oliver Cromwell and the Long Parliament came to a head, and the parliament was dissolved. On 18 May Thomson was dismissed from his posts of commissioner of the customs and of the army and navy, as well as from his other offices. He then concentrated on the views of the Fifth-monarchy men.

Thomson returned to Westminster on 7 May 1659 with the remainder of the Long Parliament. On 16 May he was again appointed a member of the Council of State, and on 8 July he was added to the committee for intelligence. On 18 August he was appointed colonel of a regiment of volunteers to be raised in London.

After the Restoration of 1660, Thomson went to ground at the residence of his brother Maurice at Lee, Kent, and occupied himself with anti-Royalist intrigues. On 31 October 1661 a warrant was issued for his arrest. After some time in obscurity, Thomson around the beginning of 1668 was nominated to the commission of accounts, and returned to public life.

== Personal life ==
Thomson married Elizabeth, daughter of James Brickland of Thorncliff in Cheshire.

== Sources ==
Attribution

This article incorporates text from a publication now in the public domain: Lee, Sidney, ed. (1898). "Thomson, George (fl.1643-1668)". Dictionary of National Biography. Vol. 56. London: Smith, Elder & Co.
