= Thomas Soame =

English politician

Sir Thomas Soame (1584 – 1 January 1671) was an English politician who sat in the House of Commons from 1640 to 1648.

== Life ==
Soame was the son of Sir Stephen Soame and his wife Anne Stone daughter of William Stone, haberdasher of London and his wife Mercy Gray daughter of John Gray of Barley, Hertfordshire. His father was Lord Mayor of London. He was baptised at St.Mary Colechurch in London on 4 February 1584.

Soame was alderman of Farringdon Without ward from 28 July 1635 to 29 January 1639 and in 1635 became Sheriff of London. He was Merchant Commissioner of the East India Company from 1640 to 1643.

In April 1640, Soame was elected Member of Parliament for City of London in the Short Parliament. He was imprisoned in the Tower of London in May 1640 with three other aldermen - Nicholas Rainton, John Gayre and Thomas Atkins - for refusing to list the inhabitants of his ward who were able to contribute £50 or more to a loan for King Charles. He was re-elected in MP for the City of London in November 1640 for the Long Parliament He was knighted in at Hampton Court on 3 December 1641. He sat in parliament until he was excluded under Pride's Purge in 1648. He became alderman for Vintry ward on 29 September 1644 and later moved to Cheap ward where he was discharged by order of House of Commons on 1 Jun 1649. He was restored to his position as Alderman on 25 Sep 1660 and held the position until 22 January 1667 when he was discharged "on account of his great infirmity".

Soame lived at Throcking and in 1660 rebuilt the upper portion of the church tower. He died in 1671 and was buried with an inscription in Throcking Church.

== Family ==
Soame was married in 1621 to Joan Freeman, widow of William Freeman of St Michael Cornhill and Aspenden, Hertfordshire. His daughter Anne married Sir Thomas Abdy, 1st Baronet.

Parliament of England
Parliament suspended since 1629	Member of Parliament for City of London; 1640–1648; With: Isaac Penington; Samuel Vassall; Matthew Cradock 1640–1641; John Venn 1641–1648	Succeeded by Isaac Penington; John Venn
