= William Owfield =

William Owfield (1 July 1623 – 1664) was an English landowner and politician who sat in the House of Commons in 1645.

Owfield was the eldest son of Sir Samuel Owfield, of Upper Gatton, Surrey and Covent Garden, and his wife Katherine Smith, daughter of William Smith, Mercer, of Thames Street, London. His father was a City of London merchant who represented Gatton in parliament. Owfield was admitted at Emmanuel College, Cambridge on 1 October 1639. He inherited the estates of his father in 1643.

In October 1645, Owfield was elected Member of Parliament for Gatton in the Long Parliament and sat until 1648 when he was secluded under Pride's Purge. He was a commissioner for assessment for Lincolnshire from 1645 to 1650 and became commissioner for defence for Lincolnshire in 1645. In 1647 he became a J.P. for Lindsey Lincolnshire and a commissioner for assessment for Surrey. He was a commissioner sequestration for Surrey and a commissioner for militia for Surrey and Lincolnshire in 1648.

Owfield was commissioner for sewers for Lincolnshire from 1658 to 1659. From March 1660 he was JP for Lincolnshire again and commissioner for militia for Surrey and Lincolnshire. In April 1660 he stood for parliament at Gatton again, but was involved in a double return and the election was declared void. He was commissioner for sewers for Lincolnshire in 1660 and commissioner for assessment for Lincolnshire from August 1660 until his death. In 1661 he was elected MP for Gatton in the Cavalier Parliament and sat until his death in 1664. He became commissioner for assessment for Surrey in 1661 until his death.

Owfield died at the end of October 1664.

Owfield married firstly Mary Thompson, daughter of Maurice Thomson (d.1676), merchant, of Mile End Green, Middlesex on 13 Nov. 1655 and had two sons. He married secondly by licence on 13 May 1662, Anne Hawkins, daughter of William Hawkins of Mortlake, Surrey.

Parliament of England
Preceded by Sir Samuel Owfield; Thomas Sandys	Member of Parliament for Gatton; 1645–1648; With: Thomas Sandys	Succeeded by Not represented in the Rump Parliament
