= Simon Norton (MP) =

English dyer and politician

Simon Norton (1578–1641) was an English dyer and politician who was active in local government in Coventry and sat in the House of Commons from 1640 to 1641.

Norton was the son of John Norton of Allesley, Warwickshire. He became a dyer and was active on the council at Coventry. He was Mayor of Coventry in 1633.

In April 1640, Norton was elected Member of Parliament for Coventry in the Short Parliament. His nephew and fellow MP William Jesson was also a dyer and together they helped defeat the aims of a Coventry weaver who petitioned Parliament against cloth from Gloucestershire being brought into the city for dying. Norton was elected MP for Coventry to the Long Parliament in November 1640 but died in 1641.

Norton married Prudence Jesson, daughter of John Jesson, in 1608. Their son Thomas was created a baronet.

Parliament of England
Vacant Parliament suspended since 1629	Member of Parliament for Coventry; 1640–1641; With: William Jesson 1640; John Barker 1641	Succeeded by John Barker; William Jesson
