= John Venn (politician) =

English politician

John Venn (1586 – 28 June 1650) was an English politician who sat in the House of Commons from 1641 to 1650. He was one of the regicides of King Charles I.

Venn was born in Lydeard St Lawrence, Somerset, England, in 1586 and was an apprentice in the Merchant Taylors' Company before becoming a wool and silk merchant. He was one of the founders of the Massachusetts Bay Company. Venn was an active member of the Honourable Artillery Company and stood against Marmaduke Roydon for election as captain-leader of the company in 1631; both were disappointed by the imposition of a candidate favoured by the Crown. In September 1640, as one of the leaders of the Puritan militants, he sent a petition to King Charles demanding religious reform. Together with Isaac Penington, he demanded the prosecution of the Earl of Strafford. In 1641, Venn was elected Member of Parliament for City of London in the Long Parliament. In 1642, he fought in the army of the Earl of Essex, and following the battle of Edgehill was appointed governor of Windsor Castle, a position he retained until 1645.

When the pro-Royalist Presbyterian mobs of London seized Westminster, he did not join the pro-Army Independent MPs in seeking asylum with the Army. He would be one of the few to change sides over the next year and a half and come to support the army against King Charles. In January 1649, as a commissioner of the High Court of Justice at the trial of King Charles, he was 53rd of the 59 signatories on the death warrant of the King. He died in 1650 before the Restoration in 1660 when many of his fellow signatories were imprisoned or executed.

Parliament of England
Preceded by Thomas Soame; Isaac Penington; Matthew Cradock; Samuel Vassall	Member of Parliament for City of London; 1641–1650; With: Thomas Soame 1641–1648; Isaac Penington; Samuel Vassall 1641–1648	Succeeded by Isaac Penington
