= William Jesson =

English dyer and politician

William Jesson (1580–1651) was an English dyer and politician who was active in local government in Coventry and sat in the House of Commons between 1640 and 1648.

Jesson was the son of Richard Jesson of Coventry and his wife Elizabeth Hill. He became a wealthy dyer of Coventry and was admitted to the council 1628, becoming mayor of Coventry in 1631 and an alderman from 1634. In 1640 Jesson purchased the Warwickshire manor of Nuthurst from Edward Trussell and it remained in the family until around 1754.

In April 1640, Jesson was elected member of parliament for Coventry in the Short Parliament. His uncle and fellow MP Simon Norton was also a dyer and together they helped defeat the aims of a Coventry weaver who petitioned Parliament against cloth from Gloucestershire being brought into the city for dyeing. Jesson was not elected immediately to the Long Parliament in November 1640 but was brought in after the death of Norton in 1641. In 1647 Jesson successfully brought in a vote in parliament to de-garrison Coventry which had been under army and committee domination in the Civil War. He was excluded in 1648 under Pride's Purge.

Jesson married Elizabeth Barker, daughter of Alderman John Barker. Their eldest son William was also MP for Coventry in 1660. Their grandson was Sir William Jesson of Burleigh Hall, Loughborough.

Parliament of England
| Parliament suspended since 1629 | Member of Parliament for Coventry; 1640; With: Simon Norton | Succeeded by Simon Norton; John Barker |
| Preceded by Simon Norton; John Barker | Member of Parliament for Coventry; 1640–1648; With: John Barker | Succeeded by John Barker |
