= Sir Thomas Norton, 1st Baronet =

English politician

Sir Thomas Norton, 1st Baronet (c. 1615 – 27 August 1691) was an English politician who sat in the House of Commons from 1685 to 1689.

Norton was the son of Simon Norton, dyer of Coventry, and his wife Prudence Jesson, daughter of John Jesson. He was created baronet of Coventry on 23 July 1661.

In 1685, Norton was elected Member of Parliament for Coventry. He held the seat to 1689.

Norton married Anne Jermy, daughter of John Jermy of Hutton Hall, Suffolk. They had four daughters but without male issue the baronetcy became extinct on his death.

Baronetage of England
New creation	Baronet (of Coventry); 1661–1691	Extinct
