= John Barker (Parliamentarian) =

English draper and politician

John Barker was an English draper and politician who sat in the House of Commons between 1640 and 1653. He supported the Parliamentary side in the English Civil War.

Barker was a draper of Coventry and was mayor of Coventry in 1634 and an alderman from 1635.

In November 1640, Barker was elected member of parliament for Coventry in the Long Parliament. Barker was a staunch parliamentarian and he and fellow MP Simon Norton gave a bond for a loan of £1,000 in November 1640. He offered £50 for the defence of the city in 1642. He became a colonel, and was governor of Coventry during the civil war. In 1644 he became mayor again when George Monck, who had been elected, was not allowed to fill the position. In 1645 Parliament required MPs to give up any civil or military offices that they held and Barker had to give up his positions as mayor and governor despite an appeal from to town. Barker was excluded from parliament in 1648 under Pride's Purge. However, there was rioting in the city in his support and he was one of the members readmitted to the Rump Parliament in October 1649.

At the end of the protectorate, the Rump Parliament was recalled in May 1659, but Barker was refused readmission.

William Jesson, also fellow MP, married Elizabeth Barker who was daughter of John Barker, draper and alderman of Coventry, This John Barker may have been Barker himself or his father. John Barker, draper, had been mayor of Coventry in 1614.

Parliament of England
Preceded by William Jesson; Simon Norton	Member of Parliament for Coventry; 1640–1653; With: Simon Norton; William Jesson	Succeeded by Not represented in Barebones Parliament
